= Texas's 25th Senate district =

American legislative district

Texas's 25th State Senate district
Senator
Donna Campbell; R–New Braunfels
- Demographics: 57.3% White; 6% Black; 32.6% Hispanic; 4.2% Asian
- Population: 971,127

District 25 of the Texas Senate is a senatorial district that currently serves all of Blanco, Comal, and Kendall counties and portions of Bexar, Guadalupe, Hays, and Travis counties in the U.S. state of Texas.

The current senator from District 25 is Donna Campbell.

== Biggest cities in the district ==
District 25 has a population of 815,771 with 610,120 that is at voting age from the 2010 census.

	Name	County	Pop. (Note: Population is based on the number of people in the district in that city, not the overall population of that city)
1	San Antonio	Bexar/Comal	301,626
2	Austin	Hays/Travis	59,018
3	New Braunfels	Comal/Guadalupe	57,740
4	Schertz	Comal/Guadalupe	30,308
5	San Marcos	Hays	20,697

== Election history ==
Election history of District 25 from 1992. (Note: Uncontested primary elections are not shown.)

=== 2024 ===
Texas general election, 2024: Senate District 25
Party	Candidate	Votes	%	±%
Republican	Donna Campbell (Incumbent)	321,653	63.57	+0.74
Democratic	Merrie Fox	184,312	36.43	−0.74
Majority		137,341	27.14	+1.48
Turnout		505,965		
Republican hold				

=== 2022 ===
Texas general election, 2022: Senate District 25
Party	Candidate	Votes	%	±%
Republican	Donna Campbell (Incumbent)	243,966	62.83	+5.15
Democratic	Robert Walsh	144,350	37.17	−5.15
Majority		99,616	25.66	+10.30
Turnout		388,316		
Republican hold				

=== 2018 ===
Texas general election, 2018: Senate District 25
Party	Candidate	Votes	%	±%
Republican	Donna Campbell (Incumbent)	236,753	57.68	−7.47
Democratic	Steven Kling	173,698	42.32	+10.49
Majority		63,055	15.36	−17.96
Turnout		410,451		
Republican hold				

=== 2014 ===
Texas general election, 2014: Senate District 25
Party	Candidate	Votes	%	±%
Republican	Donna Campbell (Incumbent)	153,536	65.15	−0.43
Democratic	Daniel Boone	75,012	31.83	−2.59
Libertarian	Brandin P. Lea	7,106	3.02	+3.02
Majority		78,524	33.32	+2.16
Turnout		235,654		
Republican hold				

=== 2012 ===
Texas general election, 2012: Senate District 25
Party	Candidate	Votes	%	±%
Republican	Donna Campbell	232,261	65.58	−16.60
Democratic	John Courage	121,906	34.42	+34.42
Majority		110,355	31.16	−33.57
Turnout		354,167		
Republican hold				

=== 2010 ===
Texas general election, 2010: Senate District 25
Party	Candidate	Votes	%	±%
Republican	Jeff Wentworth (Incumbent)	192,965	82.18	+23.86
Libertarian	Arthur Maxwell Thomas, IV	40,972	17.45	+13.00
Write-in	Eric R. Anderson	885	0.38	+0.38
Majority		151,993	64.73	+43.63
Turnout		234,822		
Republican hold				

=== 2006 ===
Texas general election, 2006: Senate District 25
Party	Candidate	Votes	%	±%
Republican	Jeff Wentworth (Incumbent)	132,872	58.32	−8.41
Democratic	Kathleen "Kathi" Thomas	84,816	37.23	+7.03
Libertarian	James R. "Bob" Thompson	10,137	4.45	+1.38
Majority		48,056	21.10	−15.45
Turnout		227,825		+11.1
Republican hold				

=== 2002 ===
Texas general election, 2002: Senate District 25
Party	Candidate	Votes	%	±%
Republican	Jeff Wentworth (Incumbent)	136,802	66.73	−20.73
Democratic	Joseph "Joe" P. Sullivan	61,899	30.20	+30.20
Libertarian	Rex Black	6,293	3.07	−9.50
Majority		74,903	36.54	−38.32
Turnout		204,994		−36.9
Republican hold				

Republican primary, 2002: Senate District 25
Candidate		Votes	%	±
	John H. Shields	25,265	48.8	
✓	Jeff Wentworth (Incumbent)	26,481	51.2	
Majority		1,216	2.4	
Turnout		51,746		

=== 2000 ===
Texas general election, 2000: Senate District 25
Party	Candidate	Votes	%	±%
Republican	Jeff Wentworth (Incumbent)	283,857	87.43	−12.57
Libertarian	George Meeks	40,806	12.57	+12.57
Majority		243,051	74.86	−25.14
Turnout		324,663		+45.1
Republican hold				

=== 1996 ===
Texas general election, 1996: Senate District 25
Party	Candidate	Votes	%	±%
Republican	Jeff Wentworth (Incumbent)	223,739	100.0	+24.97
Majority		223,739	100.0	+49.94
Turnout		223,739		+5.1
Republican hold				

Republican primary, 1996: Senate District 25
Candidate		Votes	%	±
	Randy Staudt	24,930	29.5	
✓	Jeff Wentworth (Incumbent)	59,476	70.5	
Majority		34,546	40.9	
Turnout		84,406		

=== 1994 ===
Texas general election, 1994: Senate District 25
Party	Candidate	Votes	%	±%
Republican	Jeff Wentworth (Incumbent)	159,729	75.03	+26.77
Democratic	Jim Saunders	53,152	24.97	−26.77
Majority		106,577	50.06	+46.57
Turnout		212,881		
Republican gain from Democratic				

Republican primary, 1994: Senate District 25
Candidate		Votes	%	±
	Van Archer	21,341	39.7	
✓	Jeff Wentworth (Incumbent)	32,473	60.3	
Majority		11,132	20.7	
Turnout		53,814		

=== 1992 ===
Texas general election, 1992: Senate District 25
Party	Candidate	Votes	%	±%
Democratic	Bill Sims (Incumbent)	98,763	51.74	
Republican	Troy Fraser	92,107	48.26	
Majority		6,656	3.49	
Turnout		190,870		
Democratic hold				

Democratic primary, 1992: Senate District 25
Candidate		Votes	%	±
	Robert Temple Dickson III (Incumbent)	25,691	34.6	
✓	Bill Sims (Incumbent)	48,479	65.4	
Majority		22,788	30.7	
Turnout		74,170		

Republican primary, 1992: Senate District 25
Candidate		Votes	%	±
	Jim Deats	6,641	25.4	
✓	Troy Fraser	15,076	57.6	
	Charles Johnson	4,467	17.1	
Majority		8,435	32.2	
Turnout				

== District officeholders ==
Legislature	Senator, District 25	Counties in District
4	Henry Lawrence Kinney	Kinney, Nueces, Refugio, San Patricio, Webb.
5	Henry Williams Sublett	Bastrop, Burnet, Travis.
6	John Caldwell	Bastrop, Burnet, Travis.
7	John Caldwell	Bastrop, Burnet, Travis.
8	Eggleston D. Townes; Nathan George Shelley	Bastrop, Burnet, Travis.
9	Stephen Heard Darden; Spencer Ford	Caldwell, Gonzales, Guadalupe.
10	Spencer Ford	Caldwell, Gonzales, Guadalupe.
11	James W. Stell	Caldwell, Gonzales, Guadalupe.
12	Abner K. Foster; Robert P. Tendick	Colorado, Lavaca.
13	Robert P. Tendick	Colorado, Lavaca.
14	Olintus Ellis	Colorado, Lavaca.
15	Alexander Watkins Terrell	Burnet, Lampasas, Travis, Williamson.
16	Alexander Watkins Terrell	Burnet, Lampasas, Travis, Williamson.
17	Alexander Watkins Terrell	Burnet, Lampasas, Travis, Williamson.
18	George Pfeuffer	Blanco, Caldwell, Comal, Guadalupe, Hays, Kendall, Llano.
19	George Pfeuffer	Blanco, Caldwell, Comal, Guadalupe, Hays, Kendall, Llano.
20	William Henry Burges	Blanco, Caldwell, Comal, Guadalupe, Hays, Kendall, Llano.
21	William Henry Burges	Blanco, Caldwell, Comal, Guadalupe, Hays, Kendall, Llano.
22	William Clemens	Blanco, Caldwell, Comal, Guadalupe, Hays, Kendall, Llano.
23	John M. Dean	Brewster, Buchel, Coke, Crockett, Dimmit, Edwards, El Paso, Foley, Irion, Jeff Davis, Kimble, Kinney, Llano, Mason, Maverick, Menard, Pecos, Presidio, Schleicher, Sterling, Sutton, Tom Green, Uvalde, Val Verde, Zavala.
24	John M. Dean	Brewster, Buchel, Coke, Crockett, Dimmit, Edwards, El Paso, Foley, Irion, Jeff Davis, Kimble, Kinney, Llano, Mason, Maverick, Menard, Pecos, Presidio, Schleicher, Sterling, Sutton, Tom Green, Uvalde, Val Verde, Zavala.
25	William W. Turney	Brewster, Buchel, Coke, Crockett, Dimmit, Edwards, El Paso, Foley, Irion, Jeff Davis, Kimble, Kinney, Llano, Mason, Maverick, Menard, Pecos, Presidio, Schleicher, Sterling, Sutton, Tom Green, Uvalde, Val Verde, Zavala.
26	William W. Turney	Brewster, Buchel, Coke, Crockett, Dimmit, Edwards, El Paso, Foley, Irion, Jeff Davis, Kimble, Kinney, Llano, Mason, Maverick, Menard, Pecos, Presidio, Schleicher, Sterling, Sutton, Tom Green, Uvalde, Val Verde, Zavala.
27	William W. Turney	Brewster, Buchel, Coke, Crockett, Dimmit, Edwards, El Paso, Foley, Irion, Jeff Davis, Kimble, Kinney, Llano, Mason, Maverick, Menard, Pecos, Presidio, Schleicher, Sterling, Sutton, Tom Green, Uvalde, Val Verde, Zavala.
28	Jared W. Hill	Brewster, Coke, Crockett, Edwards, El Paso, Irion, Jeff Davis, Kimble, Kinney, Mason, Maverick, Medina, Menard, Pecos, Presidio, Reeves, Schleicher, Sterling, Sutton, Tom Green, Uvalde, Val Verde, Zavala.
29	Jared W. Hill	Brewster, Coke, Crockett, Edwards, El Paso, Irion, Jeff Davis, Kimble, Kinney, Mason, Maverick, Medina, Menard, Pecos, Presidio, Reagan, Reeves, Schleicher, Sterling, Sutton, Tom Green, Uvalde, Val Verde, Zavala.
30	Claude B. Hudspeth	Brewster, Coke, Crockett, Edwards, El Paso, Irion, Jeff Davis, Kimble, Kinney, Mason, Maverick, Medina, Menard, Pecos, Presidio, Reagan, Reeves, Schleicher, Sterling, Sutton, Terrell, Tom Green, Uvalde, Val Verde, Zavala.
31	Claude B. Hudspeth	Brewster, Coke, Crockett, Edwards, El Paso, Irion, Jeff Davis, Kimble, Kinney, Mason, Maverick, Medina, Menard, Pecos, Presidio, Reagan, Reeves, Schleicher, Sterling, Sutton, Terrell, Tom Green, Uvalde, Val Verde, Zavala.
32	Claude B. Hudspeth	Brewster, Coke, Crockett, Edwards, El Paso, Irion, Jeff Davis, Kimble, Kinney, Mason, Maverick, Medina, Menard, Pecos, Presidio, Reagan, Reeves, Schleicher, Sterling, Sutton, Terrell, Tom Green, Uvalde, Val Verde, Zavala.
33	Claude B. Hudspeth	Brewster, Coke, Crockett, Edwards, El Paso, Irion, Jeff Davis, Kimble, Kinney, Mason, Maverick, Medina, Menard, Pecos, Presidio, Reagan, Reeves, Schleicher, Sterling, Sutton, Terrell, Tom Green, Uvalde, Val Verde, Zavala.
34	Claude B. Hudspeth	Brewster, Coke, Crockett, Edwards, El Paso, Irion, Jeff Davis, Kimble, Kinney, Mason, Maverick, Medina, Menard, Pecos, Presidio, Reagan, Reeves, Schleicher, Sterling, Sutton, Terrell, Tom Green, Uvalde, Val Verde, Zavala.
35	Claude B. Hudspeth	Brewster, Coke, Crockett, Culberson, Edwards, El Paso, Irion, Jeff Davis, Kimble, Kinney, Mason, Maverick, Medina, Menard, Pecos, Presidio, Reagan, Reeves, Schleicher, Sterling, Sutton, Terrell, Tom Green, Uvalde, Val Verde, Zavala.
36	Richard M. Dudley	Brewster, Coke, Crockett, Culberson, Edwards, El Paso, Irion, Jeff Davis, Kimble, Kinney, Mason, Maverick, Medina, Menard, Pecos, Presidio, Reagan, Reeves, Schleicher, Sterling, Sutton, Terrell, Tom Green, Uvalde, Val Verde, Zavala.
37	Richard M. Dudley	Brewster, Coke, Crockett, Culberson, Edwards, El Paso, Hudspeth, Irion, Jeff Davis, Kimble, Kinney, Mason, Maverick, Medina, Menard, Pecos, Presidio, Reagan, Reeves, Schleicher, Sterling, Sutton, Terrell, Tom Green, Uvalde, Val Verde, Zavala.
38	Richard M. Dudley	Brewster, Coke, Crockett, Culberson, Edwards, El Paso, Hudspeth, Irion, Jeff Davis, Kimble, Kinney, Mason, Maverick, Medina, Menard, Pecos, Presidio, Reagan, Reeves, Schleicher, Sterling, Sutton, Terrell, Tom Green, Uvalde, Val Verde, Zavala.
39	Walter C. Woodward	Brown, Coke, Coleman, Comanche, Concho, Gillespie, Irion, Kimble, Mason, McCulloch, Menard, Mills, Runnels, Schleicher, Sterling, Tom Green.
40	Walter C. Woodward	Brown, Coke, Coleman, Comanche, Concho, Gillespie, Irion, Kimble, Mason, McCulloch, Menard, Mills, Runnels, Schleicher, Sterling, Tom Green.
41	Walter C. Woodward	Brown, Coke, Coleman, Comanche, Concho, Gillespie, Irion, Kimble, Mason, McCulloch, Menard, Mills, Runnels, Schleicher, Sterling, Tom Green.
42	Walter C. Woodward	Brown, Coke, Coleman, Comanche, Concho, Gillespie, Irion, Kimble, Mason, McCulloch, Menard, Mills, Runnels, Schleicher, Sterling, Tom Green.
43	Walter C. Woodward	Brown, Coke, Coleman, Comanche, Concho, Gillespie, Irion, Kimble, Mason, McCulloch, Menard, Mills, Runnels, Schleicher, Sterling, Tom Green.
44	Ephraim M. Davis	Brown, Coke, Coleman, Comanche, Concho, Gillespie, Irion, Kimble, Mason, McCulloch, Menard, Mills, Runnels, Schleicher, Sterling, Tom Green.
45	Ephraim M. Davis	Brown, Coke, Coleman, Comanche, Concho, Gillespie, Irion, Kimble, Mason, McCulloch, Menard, Mills, Runnels, Schleicher, Sterling, Tom Green.
46	Penrose Metcalfe	Brown, Coke, Coleman, Comanche, Concho, Gillespie, Irion, Kimble, Mason, McCulloch, Menard, Mills, Runnels, Schleicher, Sterling, Tom Green.
47	Penrose Metcalfe	Brown, Coke, Coleman, Comanche, Concho, Gillespie, Irion, Kimble, Mason, McCulloch, Menard, Mills, Runnels, Schleicher, Sterling, Tom Green.
48	Penrose Metcalfe	Brown, Coke, Coleman, Comanche, Concho, Gillespie, Irion, Kimble, Mason, McCulloch, Menard, Mills, Runnels, Schleicher, Sterling, Tom Green.
49	Penrose Metcalfe	Brown, Coke, Coleman, Comanche, Concho, Gillespie, Irion, Kimble, Mason, McCulloch, Menard, Mills, Runnels, Schleicher, Sterling, Tom Green.
50	Dorsey B. Hardeman	Brown, Coke, Coleman, Comanche, Concho, Gillespie, Irion, Kimble, Mason, McCulloch, Menard, Mills, Runnels, Schleicher, Sterling, Tom Green.
51	Dorsey B. Hardeman	Brown, Coke, Coleman, Comanche, Concho, Gillespie, Irion, Kimble, Mason, McCulloch, Menard, Mills, Runnels, Schleicher, Sterling, Tom Green.
52	Dorsey B. Hardeman	Brown, Coke, Coleman, Comanche, Concho, Gillespie, Irion, Kimble, Mason, McCulloch, Menard, Mills, Runnels, Schleicher, Sterling, Tom Green.
53	Dorsey B. Hardeman	Brewster, Coke, Coleman, Crane, Crockett, Edwards, Glasscock, Irion, Jeff Davis, Pecos, Presidio, Reagan, Runnels, Schleicher, Sterling, Sutton, Terrell, Tom Green, Upton, Val Verde.
54	Dorsey B. Hardeman	Brewster, Coke, Coleman, Crane, Crockett, Edwards, Glasscock, Irion, Jeff Davis, Pecos, Presidio, Reagan, Runnels, Schleicher, Sterling, Sutton, Terrell, Tom Green, Upton, Val Verde.
55	Dorsey B. Hardeman	Brewster, Coke, Coleman, Crane, Crockett, Edwards, Glasscock, Irion, Jeff Davis, Pecos, Presidio, Reagan, Runnels, Schleicher, Sterling, Sutton, Terrell, Tom Green, Upton, Val Verde.
56	Dorsey B. Hardeman	Brewster, Coke, Coleman, Crane, Crockett, Edwards, Glasscock, Irion, Jeff Davis, Pecos, Presidio, Reagan, Runnels, Schleicher, Sterling, Sutton, Terrell, Tom Green, Upton, Val Verde.
57	Dorsey B. Hardeman	Brewster, Coke, Coleman, Crane, Crockett, Edwards, Glasscock, Irion, Jeff Davis, Pecos, Presidio, Reagan, Runnels, Schleicher, Sterling, Sutton, Terrell, Tom Green, Upton, Val Verde.
58	Dorsey B. Hardeman	Brewster, Coke, Coleman, Crane, Crockett, Edwards, Glasscock, Irion, Jeff Davis, Pecos, Presidio, Reagan, Runnels, Schleicher, Sterling, Sutton, Terrell, Tom Green, Upton, Val Verde.
59	Dorsey B. Hardeman	Brewster, Coke, Coleman, Crane, Crockett, Edwards, Glasscock, Irion, Jeff Davis, Pecos, Presidio, Reagan, Runnels, Schleicher, Sterling, Sutton, Terrell, Tom Green, Upton, Val Verde.
60	Dorsey B. Hardeman	Brewster, Crane, Crockett, Ector, Edwards, Irion, Jeff Davis, Kinney, Loving, Midland, Pecos, Presidio, Reagan, Reeves, Schleicher, Sutton, Terrell, Tom Green, Upton, Uvalde, Val Verde.
61	W. E. "Pete" Snelson	Brewster, Crane, Crockett, Ector, Edwards, Irion, Jeff Davis, Kinney, Loving, Midland, Pecos, Presidio, Reagan, Reeves, Schleicher, Sutton, Terrell, Tom Green, Upton, Uvalde, Val Verde.
62	W. E. "Pete" Snelson	Brewster, Crane, Crockett, Ector, Edwards, Irion, Jeff Davis, Kinney, Loving, Midland, Pecos, Presidio, Reagan, Reeves, Schleicher, Sutton, Terrell, Tom Green, Upton, Uvalde, Val Verde.
63	W. E. "Pete" Snelson	Bandera, Brewster, Coke, Comal, Crane, Crockett, Culberson, Edwards, Gillespie, Glasscock, Irion, Jeff Davis, Kendall, Kerr, Kimble, Kinney, Llano, Loving, Mason, Midland, Pecos, Presidio, Reagan, Real, Reeves, Schleicher, Sterling, Sutton, Terrell, Tom Green, Upton, Uvalde, Val Verde, Ward, Winkler.
64	W. E. "Pete" Snelson	Bandera, Brewster, Coke, Comal, Crane, Crockett, Culberson, Edwards, Gillespie, Glasscock, Irion, Jeff Davis, Kendall, Kerr, Kimble, Kinney, Llano, Loving, Mason, Midland, Pecos, Presidio, Reagan, Real, Reeves, Schleicher, Sterling, Sutton, Terrell, Tom Green, Upton, Uvalde, Val Verde, Ward, Winkler.
65	W. E. "Pete" Snelson	Bandera, Brewster, Coke, Comal, Crane, Crockett, Culberson, Edwards, Gillespie, Glasscock, Irion, Jeff Davis, Kendall, Kerr, Kimble, Kinney, Llano, Loving, Mason, Midland, Pecos, Presidio, Reagan, Real, Reeves, Schleicher, Sterling, Sutton, Terrell, Tom Green, Upton, Uvalde, Val Verde, Ward, Winkler.
66	W. E. "Pete" Snelson	Bandera, Brewster, Coke, Comal, Crane, Crockett, Culberson, Edwards, Gillespie, Glasscock, Irion, Jeff Davis, Kendall, Kerr, Kimble, Kinney, Llano, Loving, Mason, Midland, Pecos, Presidio, Reagan, Real, Reeves, Schleicher, Sterling, Sutton, Terrell, Tom Green, Upton, Uvalde, Val Verde, Ward, Winkler.
67	W. E. "Pete" Snelson	Bandera, Brewster, Coke, Comal, Crane, Crockett, Culberson, Edwards, Gillespie, Glasscock, Irion, Jeff Davis, Kendall, Kerr, Kimble, Kinney, Llano, Loving, Mason, Midland, Pecos, Presidio, Reagan, Real, Reeves, Schleicher, Sterling, Sutton, Terrell, Tom Green, Upton, Uvalde, Val Verde, Ward, Winkler.
68	Bill Sims	All of Bandera, Blanco, Brewster, Coke, Crane, Crockett, Culberson, Edwards, Gillespie, Glasscock, Hudspeth, Irion, Jeff Davis, Kendall, Kerr, Kimble, Kinney, Loving, Mason, Medina, Menard, Midland, Pecos, Presidio, Reagan, Real, Reeves, Schleicher, Sterling, Sutton, Terrell, Tom Green, Upton, Uvalde, Val Verde, Ward, Winkler. Portion of El Paso.
69	Bill Sims	All of Bandera, Blanco, Brewster, Coke, Crane, Crockett, Culberson, Edwards, Gillespie, Glasscock, Hudspeth, Irion, Jeff Davis, Kendall, Kerr, Kimble, Kinney, Loving, Mason, Medina, Menard, Midland, Pecos, Presidio, Reagan, Real, Reeves, Schleicher, Sterling, Sutton, Terrell, Tom Green, Upton, Uvalde, Val Verde, Ward, Winkler. Portion of El Paso.
70	Bill Sims	All of Bandera, Blanco, Brewster, Coke, Crane, Crockett, Culberson, Edwards, Gillespie, Glasscock, Hudspeth, Irion, Jeff Davis, Kendall, Kerr, Kimble, Loving, Mason, Medina, Menard, Midland, Pecos, Presidio, Reagan, Real, Reeves, Schleicher, Sterling, Sutton, Terrell, Tom Green, Upton, Val Verde, Ward, Winkler. Portions of Bexar, Comal, El Paso.
71	Bill Sims	All of Bandera, Blanco, Brewster, Coke, Crane, Crockett, Culberson, Edwards, Gillespie, Glasscock, Hudspeth, Irion, Jeff Davis, Kendall, Kerr, Kimble, Loving, Mason, Medina, Menard, Midland, Pecos, Presidio, Reagan, Real, Reeves, Schleicher, Sterling, Sutton, Terrell, Tom Green, Upton, Val Verde, Ward, Winkler. Portions of Bexar, Comal, El Paso.
72	Bill Sims	All of Bandera, Blanco, Brewster, Coke, Crane, Crockett, Culberson, Edwards, Gillespie, Glasscock, Hudspeth, Irion, Jeff Davis, Kendall, Kerr, Kimble, Loving, Mason, Medina, Menard, Midland, Pecos, Presidio, Reagan, Real, Reeves, Schleicher, Sterling, Sutton, Terrell, Tom Green, Upton, Val Verde, Ward, Winkler. Portions of Bexar, Comal, El Paso.
73	Bill Sims	All of Bandera, Blanco, Callahan, Coke, Crockett, Edwards, Gillespie, Hudspeth, Irion, Kendall, Kerr, Kimble, Llano, Mason, Menard, Mitchell, Real, Schleicher, Shackelford, Sterling, Sutton, Taylor, Tom Green. Portions of Bexar, Comal.
74	Jeff Wentworth	All of Bandera, Blanco, Gillespie, Kendall, Kerr, Kimble, Mason, Schleicher. Portions of Bexar, Comal, Guadalupe, Llano, Sutton, Tom Green, Travis.
75	Jeff Wentworth	All of Bandera, Blanco, Gillespie, Kendall, Kerr, Kimble, Mason, Schleicher. Portions of Bexar, Comal, Guadalupe, Llano, Sutton, Tom Green, Travis.
76	Jeff Wentworth	All of Bandera, Blanco, Gillespie, Kendall, Kerr, Kimble, Mason, Schleicher. Portions of Bexar, Comal, Guadalupe, Llano, Sutton, Tom Green, Travis.
77	Jeff Wentworth	All of Bandera, Blanco, Gillespie, Kendall, Kerr, Kimble, Mason, Schleicher. Portions of Bexar, Comal, Guadalupe, Llano, Sutton, Tom Green, Travis.
78	Jeff Wentworth	All of Comal, Guadalupe, Hays, Kendall. Portions of Bexar, Travis.
79	Jeff Wentworth	All of Comal, Guadalupe, Hays, Kendall. Portions of Bexar, Travis.
80	Jeff Wentworth	All of Comal, Guadalupe, Hays, Kendall. Portions of Bexar, Travis.
81	Jeff Wentworth	All of Comal, Guadalupe, Hays, Kendall. Portions of Bexar, Travis.
82	Jeff Wentworth	All of Comal, Guadalupe, Hays, Kendall. Portions of Bexar, Travis.
83	Donna Campbell	All of Comal, Kendall. Portions of Bexar, Guadalupe, Hays, Travis.
84	Donna Campbell	All of Comal, Kendall. Portions of Bexar, Guadalupe, Hays, Travis.
85	Donna Campbell	All of Comal, Kendall. Portions of Bexar, Guadalupe, Hays, Travis.
86	Donna Campbell	All of Comal, Kendall. Portions of Bexar, Guadalupe, Hays, Travis.
87	Donna Campbell	All of Comal, Kendall. Portions of Bexar, Guadalupe, Hays, Travis.
88	Donna Campbell	All of Blanco, Comal, Kendall. Portions of Bexar, Guadalupe, Hays, Travis.
89	Donna Campbell	All of Blanco, Comal, Kendall. Portions of Bexar, Guadalupe, Hays, Travis.
