= Texas's 26th Senate district =

American legislative district

Texas's 26th State Senate district
Senator
Jose Menendez; D–San Antonio
- Demographics: 19.8% White; 8.2% Black; 69.1% Hispanic; 3.5% Asian
- Population: 875,275

District 26 of the Texas Senate is a senatorial district that currently serves a portion of Bexar county in the U.S. state of Texas.

The current senator from District 26 is Jose Menendez.

== Biggest cities in the district ==
District 26 has a population of 802,046 with 589,522 that is at voting age from the 2010 census.

	Name	County	Pop. (Note: Population is based on the number of people in the district in that city, not the overall population of that city)
1	San Antonio	Bexar	710,302
2	Converse	Bexar	10,667
3	Leon Valley	Bexar	10,151
4	Windcrest	Bexar	5,364
5	Live Oak	Bexar	4,847

== Election history ==
Election history of District 27 from 1992. (Note: Uncontested primary elections are not shown.)

=== 2022 ===
Texas general election, 2022: Senate District 26
Party	Candidate	Votes	%	±%
Democratic	Jose Menendez (Incumbent)	140,799	66.55	−13.44
Republican	Ashton Murray	70,773	33.45	+33.45
Turnout		211,572		
Democratic hold				

=== 2020 ===
Texas general election, 2020: Senate District 26
Party	Candidate	Votes	%	±%
Democratic	Jose Menendez (Incumbent)	199,829	79.99	+0.12
Green	Julian Villarreal	50,004	20.01	+13.57
Turnout		249,833	100.00	
Democratic hold				

=== 2016 ===
Texas general election, 2016: Senate District 26
Party	Candidate	Votes	%	±%
Democratic	Jose Menendez (Incumbent)	155,441	79.87	−0.55
Libertarian	Fidel "TwoBears" Castillo	26,639	13.69	+0.61
Green	Scott Pusich	12,535	6.44	+0.41
Turnout		194,615		
Democratic hold				

=== 2015 (special) ===
Texas special election runoff, 2015: Senate District 26
Party	Candidate	Votes	%	±%
Democratic	Jose Menendez	13,891	59.05	+33.69
Democratic	Trey Martinez Fischer	9,635	40.95	−2.33
Turnout		23,526		
Democratic hold				

Texas special election, 2015: Senate District 26
Party	Candidate	Votes	%
Democratic	Trey Martinez Fischer	8,232	43.28
Democratic	Jose Menendez	4,824	25.36
Republican	Alma Perez Jackson	3,892	20.46
Republican	Joan Pedrotti	1,427	7.50
Democratic	Al Suarez	644	3.39
Turnout		19,019	

=== 2012 ===
Texas general election, 2012: Senate District 26
Party	Candidate	Votes	%	±%
Democratic	Leticia R. Van de Putte (Incumbent)	140,757	80.42	−1.02
Libertarian	Nazirite R. Flores Perez	22,904	13.08	−5.47
Green	Chris Christal	10,557	6.03	+6.03
Independent	Deborah L. Parrish	801	0.45	+0.45
Turnout		175,019		+4.11
Democratic hold				

=== 2008 ===
Texas general election, 2008: Senate District 26
Party	Candidate	Votes	%	±%
Democratic	Leticia R. Van de Putte (Incumbent)	136,913	81.44	+24.34
Libertarian	Steve Lopez	31,194	18.55	+15.69
Majority		105,719	62.89	+45.83
Turnout		168,107		−9.13
Democratic hold				

=== 2004 ===
Texas general election, 2004: Senate District 26
Party	Candidate	Votes	%	±%
Republican	Jim Valdez	74,070	40.04	+40.04
Democratic	Leticia R. Van de Putte (Incumbent)	105,625	57.10	−42.90
Libertarian	Raymundo Alemán	5,295	2.86	+2.86
Majority		31,555	17.06	−82.94
Turnout		184,990		+149.44
Democratic hold				

Democratic primary, 2004: Senate District 26
Candidate		Votes	%	±
	Johnny Rodriguez	3,685	18.06	
✓	Leticia R. Van de Putte (Incumbent)	16,723	81.94	
Majority		13,038	63.89	
Turnout		20,408		

=== 2002 ===
Texas general election, 2002: Senate District 26
Party	Candidate	Votes	%	±%
Democratic	Leticia R. Van de Putte (Incumbent)	74,163	100.00	0.00
Majority		74,163	100.00	0.00
Turnout		74,163		−29.88
Democratic hold				

=== 2000 ===
Texas general election, 2000: Senate District 26
Party	Candidate	Votes	%	±%
Democratic	Leticia R. Van de Putte (Incumbent)	105,771	100.00	+32.46
Majority		105,771	100.00	+64.92
Turnout		105,771		−16.86
Democratic hold				

Democratic primary, 2000: Senate District 26
Candidate		Votes	%	±
	David McQuade Leibowitz	11,232	45.63	
✓	Leticia R. Van de Putte (Incumbent)	13,381	54.37	
Majority		2,149	8.73	
Turnout		24,613		

=== 1999 (special) ===
Alvarado withdrew after the election, meaning, meaning Van de Putte was elected without a runoff election.

Texas Senate District 26 special election - 2 November 1999
Party	Candidate	Votes	%	±%
Democratic	Leticia Van de Putte	27,139	45.74	
Democratic	Leo Alvarado, Jr.	12,473	21.02	
Republican	Mark Weber	8,702	14.67	
Republican	Anne Newman	6,768	11.41	
Democratic	Lauro Bustamante, Jr.	4,245	7.16	
Turnout		59,327		
Democratic hold				

=== 1996 ===
Texas general election, 1996: Senate District 26
Party	Candidate	Votes	%	±%
Republican	Andrew Longaker	41,298	32.46	−4.26
Democratic	Gregory Luna	85,922	67.54	+4.26
Majority		44,624	35.07	+8.51
Turnout		127,220		+44.28
Democratic hold				

=== 1994 ===
Texas general election, 1994: Senate District 26
Party	Candidate	Votes	%	±%
Democratic	Gregory Luna	55,799	63.28	+29.88
Republican	Andrew Longaker	32,375	36.71	−29.88
Majority		23,424	26.56	−6.63
Turnout		88,174		−59.82
Democratic gain from Republican				

=== 1992 ===
Texas general election, 1992: Senate District 26
Party	Candidate	Votes	%	±%
Democratic	Carlos Higgins	73,303	33.40	
Republican	Jeff Wentworth	146,159	66.60	
Majority		72,856	33.20	
Turnout		219,462		
Republican hold				

Republican primary runoff, 1992: Senate District 26
Candidate		Votes	%	±
	Allen Schoolcraft	10,388	47.30	+12.59
✓	Jeff Wentworth	11,574	52.70	+18.98
Majority		1,186	5.40	
Turnout		21,962		

Republican primary, 1992: Senate District 26
Candidate		Votes	%	±
	Jim Canady	1,547	3.71	
	John Fisher	7,222	17.30	
	George Pierce	4,407	10.56	
✓	Allen Schoolcraft	14,490	34.71	
✓	Jeff Wentworth	14,076	33.72	
Turnout		41,742		

== District officeholders ==
Legislature	Senator, District 26	Counties in District
4	Rufus Doane	El Paso, Presidio, Santa Fé, Worth.
5	James T. Lytle	Calhoun, DeWitt, Goliad, Jackson, Lavaca, Victoria.
6	Samuel Addison White	Calhoun, DeWitt, Goliad, Jackson, Lavaca, Victoria.
7	Fletcher S. Stockdale	Calhoun, DeWitt, Goliad, Jackson, Lavaca, Victoria.
8	Fletcher S. Stockdale	Calhoun, DeWitt, Goliad, Jackson, Lavaca, Victoria.
9	Nathan George Shelley	Bastrop, Hays, Travis.
10	A. W. Moore	Bastrop, Hays, Travis.
11	Nathan George Shelley	Bastrop, Hays, Travis.
12	E. L. Alford; Reinhard Hillebrand	Bastrop, Fayette.
13	Joseph D. Sayers	Bastrop, Fayette.
14	William Hamilton Ledbetter	Bastrop, Fayette.
15	William Hamilton Ledbetter	Bastrop, Fayette, Lee.
16	William Hamilton Ledbetter	Bastrop, Fayette, Lee.
17	A. W. Moore	Bastrop, Fayette, Lee.
18	Rudolph Kleberg	Aransas, Atascosa, Bee, Calhoun, DeWitt, Goliad, Jackson, Karnes, Live Oak, McMullen, Refugio, San Patricio, Victoria, Wilson.
19	Rudolph Kleberg	Aransas, Atascosa, Bee, Calhoun, DeWitt, Goliad, Jackson, Karnes, Live Oak, McMullen, Refugio, San Patricio, Victoria, Wilson.
20	William H. Woodward	Aransas, Atascosa, Bee, Calhoun, DeWitt, Goliad, Jackson, Karnes, Live Oak, McMullen, Refugio, San Patricio, Victoria, Wilson.
21	William H. Woodward	Aransas, Atascosa, Bee, Calhoun, DeWitt, Goliad, Jackson, Karnes, Live Oak, McMullen, Refugio, San Patricio, Victoria, Wilson.
22	Reed N. Weisiger	Aransas, Atascosa, Bee, Calhoun, DeWitt, Goliad, Jackson, Karnes, Live Oak, McMullen, Refugio, San Patricio, Victoria, Wilson.
23	James M. Presler	Brown, Coleman, Comanche, Concho, Erath, McCulloch, Mills, Runnels, San Saba.
24	James M. Presler	Brown, Coleman, Comanche, Concho, Erath, McCulloch, Mills, Runnels, San Saba.
25	James M. Presler	Brown, Coleman, Comanche, Concho, Erath, McCulloch, Mills, Runnels, San Saba.
26	Archibald Grinnan	Brown, Coleman, Comanche, Concho, Erath, McCulloch, Mills, Runnels, San Saba.
27	Archibald Grinnan	Brown, Coleman, Comanche, Concho, Erath, McCulloch, Mills, Runnels, San Saba.
28	Archibald Grinnan	Brown, Coleman, Comanche, Concho, Erath, Llano, McCulloch, Mills, Runnels, San Saba.
29	Archibald Grinnan	Brown, Coleman, Comanche, Concho, Erath, Llano, McCulloch, Mills, Runnels, San Saba.
30	Archibald Grinnan	Brown, Coleman, Comanche, Concho, Erath, Llano, McCulloch, Mills, Runnels, San Saba.
31	William N. Adams	Brown, Coleman, Comanche, Concho, Erath, Llano, McCulloch, Mills, Runnels, San Saba.
32	William N. Adams	Brown, Coleman, Comanche, Concho, Erath, Llano, McCulloch, Mills, Runnels, San Saba.
33	Robert B. Conner	Brown, Coleman, Comanche, Concho, Erath, Llano, McCulloch, Mills, Runnels, San Saba.
34	Robert B. Conner	Brown, Coleman, Comanche, Concho, Erath, Llano, McCulloch, Mills, Runnels, San Saba.
35	W. Scott Woodward	Brown, Coleman, Comanche, Concho, Erath, Llano, McCulloch, Mills, Runnels, San Saba.
36	W. Scott Woodward; Elbridge L. Rector	Brown, Coleman, Comanche, Concho, Erath, Llano, McCulloch, Mills, Runnels, San Saba.
37	James H. Baugh	Brown, Coleman, Comanche, Concho, Erath, Llano, McCulloch, Mills, Runnels, San Saba.
38	James H. Baugh	Brown, Coleman, Comanche, Concho, Erath, Llano, McCulloch, Mills, Runnels, San Saba.
39	Julius Real	Bandera, Bexar, Kendall, Kerr.
40	Julius Real	Bandera, Bexar, Kendall, Kerr.
41	W. Albert "Cap" Williamson	Bandera, Bexar, Kendall, Kerr.
42	W. Albert "Cap" Williamson	Bandera, Bexar, Kendall, Kerr.
43	Ernest Fellbaum	Bandera, Bexar, Kendall, Kerr.
44	Ernest Fellbaum	Bandera, Bexar, Kendall, Kerr.
45	J. Franklin Spears	Bandera, Bexar, Kendall, Kerr.
46	J. Franklin Spears	Bandera, Bexar, Kendall, Kerr.
47	J. Franklin Spears	Bandera, Bexar, Kendall, Kerr.
48	J. Franklin Spears	Bandera, Bexar, Kendall, Kerr.
49	J. Franklin Spears; Walter Tynan	Bandera, Bexar, Kendall, Kerr.
50	Walter Tynan	Bandera, Bexar, Kendall, Kerr.
51	Walter Tynan	Bandera, Bexar, Kendall, Kerr.
52	Walter Tynan	Bandera, Bexar, Kendall, Kerr.
53	Oswald Latimer	Bexar.
54	Oswald Latimer	Bexar.
55	Henry B. Gonzalez	Bexar.
56	Henry B. Gonzalez	Bexar.
57	Henry B. Gonzalez	Bexar.
58	Franklin Spears	Bexar.
59	Franklin Spears	Bexar.
60	Joe J. Bernal	Portion of Bexar.
61	Joe J. Bernal	Portion of Bexar.
62	Joe J. Bernal	Portion of Bexar.
63	Nelson Wolff	Portion of Bexar.
64	Frank Lombardino	Portion of Bexar.
65	Frank Lombardino	Portion of Bexar.
66	R. L. "Bob" Vale	Portion of Bexar.
67	R. L. "Bob" Vale	Portion of Bexar.
68	R. L. "Bob" Vale	Portion of Bexar.
69	Cyndi Taylor Krier	Portion of Bexar.
70	Cyndi Taylor Krier	Portion of Bexar.
71	Cyndi Taylor Krier	Portion of Bexar.
72	Cyndi Taylor Krier	Portion of Bexar.
73	Jeff Wentworth	All of Guadalupe. Portion of Bexar.
74	Gregory Luna	Portion of Bexar.
75	Gregory Luna	Portion of Bexar.
76	Gregory Luna; Leticia R. Van de Putte	Portion of Bexar.
77	Leticia R. Van de Putte	Portion of Bexar.
78	Leticia R. Van de Putte	Portion of Bexar.
79	Leticia R. Van de Putte	Portion of Bexar.
80	Leticia R. Van de Putte	Portion of Bexar.
81	Leticia R. Van de Putte	Portion of Bexar.
82	Leticia R. Van de Putte	Portion of Bexar.
83	Leticia R. Van de Putte	Portion of Bexar.
84	Leticia R. Van de Putte; Jose Menendez	Portion of Bexar.
85	Jose Menendez	Portion of Bexar.
86	Jose Menendez	Portion of Bexar.
87	Jose Menendez	Portion of Bexar.
88	Jose Menendez	Portion of Bexar.
89	Jose Menendez	Portion of Bexar.
