= Texas's 5th Senate district =

American legislative district

Texas's 5th State Senate district
Senator
Charles Schwertner; R–Georgetown
- Demographics: 59.2% White; 11% Black; 23.6% Hispanic; 6.1% Asian
- Population: 961,423

District 5 of the Texas Senate is a senatorial district that serves all of Bastrop, Brazos, Freestone, Leon, Limestone, Madison, Milam, Robertson, San Jacinto, Walker counties, and a portion of Williamson county in the U.S. state of Texas. The current senator from District 5 is Charles Schwertner.

== Election history ==
Election history of District 5 from 1992.

=== 2022 ===
Texas general election, 2022: Senate District 5
Party	Candidate	Votes	%	±%
Republican	Charles Schwertner (incumbent)	192,146	71.57	+16.23
Libertarian	Tommy Estes	76,317	28.43	+25.25
Total votes		268,463	100.0	
Republican hold				

=== 2018 ===
Texas general election, 2018: Senate District 5
Party	Candidate	Votes	%	±%
Republican	Charles Schwertner (incumbent)	182,550	55.34	−9.63
Democratic	Meg Walsh	136,792	41.47	+10.24
Libertarian	Amy Lyons	10,500	3.18	−0.61
Total votes		329,842	100.0	
Republican hold				

=== 2014 ===
Texas general election, 2014: Senate District 5
Party	Candidate	Votes	%	±%
Republican	Charles Schwertner	112,930	64.97	−12.16
Democratic	Joel Shapiro	54,286	31.23	+31.23
Libertarian	Matthew Whittington	6,595	3.79	−19.07
Turnout		173,811		

=== 2012 ===
Texas general election, 2012: Senate District 5
Party	Candidate	Votes	%	±%
Republican	Charles Schwertner	182,554	77.13	+5.86
Libertarian	Jeffrey Fox	54,107	22.86	+22.86
Turnout		236,661		
Republican hold				

=== 2010 ===
Texas general election, 2010: Senate District 5
Party	Candidate	Votes	%	±%
Republican	Steve Ogden (Incumbent)	145,170	71.27	+9.79
Libertarian	Stephen M. Wyman	58,525	28.73	−5.89
Turnout		203,695		
Republican hold				

=== 2006 ===
Texas general election, 2006: Senate District 5
Party	Candidate	Votes	%	±%
Republican	Steve Ogden (Incumbent)	105,979	61.48	−25.38
Democratic	Stephen Wyman	59,671	34.62	+34.62
Libertarian	Darrell R. Grear	6,719	3.90	−9.25
Majority		46,308	26.87	−46.84
Turnout		172,369		22.59
Republican hold				

=== 2002 ===
Texas general election, 2002: Senate District 5
Party	Candidate	Votes	%	±%
Republican	Steve Ogden (Incumbent)	122,119	86.86	+31.19
Libertarian	Randall Barfield	18,482	13.14	+13.14
Majority		103,637	73.71	+62.38
Turnout		140,601		+1.35
Republican hold				

=== 1998 ===
Texas general election, 1998: Senate District 5
Party	Candidate	Votes	%	±%
Republican	Steve Ogden (Incumbent)	77,227	55.67	+0.21
Democratic	Mary M. Moore	61,508	44.33	−0.21
Majority		15,719	11.33	+0.41
Turnout		138,735		+262.17
Republican hold				

=== 1997 (special) ===
Special election, 1997: Senate District 5, Unexpired term
Party	Candidate	Votes	%	±%
Republican	Steve Ogden	21,245	55.46	+11.45
Democratic	Mary M. Moore	17,062	44.54	−11.45
Majority		4,183	10.92	−1.06
Turnout		38,307		−74.01
Republican gain from Democratic				

=== 1994 ===
Texas general election, 1994: Senate District 5
Party	Candidate	Votes	%	±%
Democratic	Jim Turner (Incumbent)	82,541	55.99	−44.01
Republican	Jerry T. Thornton	64,875	44.01	+44.01
Majority		17,666	11.98	−88.02
Turnout		147,416		+9.30
Democratic hold				

=== 1992 ===
Texas general election, 1992: Senate District 5
Party	Candidate	Votes	%	±%
Democratic	Jim Turner (Incumbent)	134,875	100.00	
Majority		134,875	100.00	
Turnout		134,875		
Democratic hold				

== District officeholders ==
Legislature	Senator, District 5	Counties in District
1	Benjamin Rush Wallace	San Augustine, Shelby.
2	Benjamin Rush Wallace	San Augustine, Shelby.
3	David Gage	Panola, Rusk.
4	M. D. K. Taylor	Cass, Titus.
5	Jefferson Weatherford	Dallas, Ellis, Tarrant.
6	Jefferson Weatherford	Dallas, Ellis, Tarrant.
7	Albert G. Walker	Dallas, Ellis, Tarrant.
8	Albert G. Walker	Dallas, Ellis, Tarrant.
9	Jesse H. Parsons	Rusk.
10	Jesse H. Parsons	Rusk.
11	John G. Brown	Rusk.
12	David Webster Flanagan	Panola, Rusk.
13	David Webster Flanagan	Panola, Rusk.
14	David Webster Flanagan	Harrison, Rusk.
15	Francis M. Henry	Bowie, Cass, Marion, Morris.
16	William H. Tilson	Bowie, Cass, Marion, Morris.
17	William H. Tilson	Bowie, Cass, Marion, Morris.
18	E. A. King	Camp, Delta, Franklin, Hopkins, Hunt.
19	Samuel D. Stinson	Camp, Delta, Franklin, Hopkins, Hunt.
20	Samuel D. Stinson	Camp, Delta, Franklin, Hopkins, Hunt.
21	John Walter Cranford	Camp, Delta, Franklin, Hopkins, Hunt.
22	John Walter Cranford	Camp, Delta, Franklin, Hopkins, Hunt.
23	Charles Henderson Yoakum	Collin, Hunt.
24	James S. Sherrill	Collin, Hunt.
25	James R. Gough	Collin, Hunt.
26	James R. Gough	Collin, Hunt.
27	E. W. Harris	Collin, Hunt.
28	Thomas M. Cain	Collin, Hunt, Rains.
29	Benjamin F. Looney	Collin, Hunt, Rains.
30	Benjamin F. Looney	Collin, Hunt, Rains.
31	Thomas W. Perkins	Collin, Hunt, Rains.
32	Thomas W. Perkins	Collin, Hunt, Rains.
33	Ed Westbrook	Collin, Hunt, Rains.
34	Ed Westbrook	Collin, Hunt, Rains.
35	Ed Westbrook	Collin, Hunt, Rains.
36	Ed Westbrook	Collin, Hunt, Rains.
37	Woodville J. Rogers, Jr.	Collin, Hunt, Rains.
38	Woodville J. Rogers, Jr.	Collin, Hunt, Rains.
39	Henry L. Lewis	Grimes, Houston, Leon, Madison, Montgomery, Polk, San Jacinto, Trinity, Walker.
40	Henry L. Lewis	Grimes, Houston, Leon, Madison, Montgomery, Polk, San Jacinto, Trinity, Walker.
41	Nat Patton	Grimes, Houston, Leon, Madison, Montgomery, Polk, San Jacinto, Trinity, Walker.
42	Nat Patton	Grimes, Houston, Leon, Madison, Montgomery, Polk, San Jacinto, Trinity, Walker.
43	Nat Patton	Grimes, Houston, Leon, Madison, Montgomery, Polk, San Jacinto, Trinity, Walker.
44	Gordon M. Burns	Grimes, Houston, Leon, Madison, Montgomery, Polk, San Jacinto, Trinity, Walker.
45	Gordon M. Burns	Grimes, Houston, Leon, Madison, Montgomery, Polk, San Jacinto, Trinity, Walker.
46	Gordon M. Burns	Grimes, Houston, Leon, Madison, Montgomery, Polk, San Jacinto, Trinity, Walker.
47	Clement Fain, Jr.	Grimes, Houston, Leon, Madison, Montgomery, Polk, San Jacinto, Trinity, Walker.
48	Clement Fain, Jr.	Grimes, Houston, Leon, Madison, Montgomery, Polk, San Jacinto, Trinity, Walker.
49	Roger A. Knight	Grimes, Houston, Leon, Madison, Montgomery, Polk, San Jacinto, Trinity, Walker.
50	Roger A. Knight	Grimes, Houston, Leon, Madison, Montgomery, Polk, San Jacinto, Trinity, Walker.
51	Neveille Colson	Grimes, Houston, Leon, Madison, Montgomery, Polk, San Jacinto, Trinity, Walker.
52	Neveille Colson	Grimes, Houston, Leon, Madison, Montgomery, Polk, San Jacinto, Trinity, Walker.
53	Neveille Colson	Grimes, Houston, Leon, Liberty, Madison, Montgomery, Polk, San Jacinto, Trinity, Walker.
54	Neveille Colson	Grimes, Houston, Leon, Liberty, Madison, Montgomery, Polk, San Jacinto, Trinity, Walker.
55	Neveille Colson	Grimes, Houston, Leon, Liberty, Madison, Montgomery, Polk, San Jacinto, Trinity, Walker.
56	Neveille Colson	Grimes, Houston, Leon, Liberty, Madison, Montgomery, Polk, San Jacinto, Trinity, Walker.
57	Neveille Colson	Grimes, Houston, Leon, Liberty, Madison, Montgomery, Polk, San Jacinto, Trinity, Walker.
58	Neveille Colson	Grimes, Houston, Leon, Liberty, Madison, Montgomery, Polk, San Jacinto, Trinity, Walker, Waller.
59	Neveille Colson	Grimes, Houston, Leon, Liberty, Madison, Montgomery, Polk, San Jacinto, Trinity, Walker, Waller.
60	William T. "Bill" Moore	Brazos, Burleson, Chambers, Fayette, Freestone, Grimes, Houston, Lee, Leon, Liberty, Madison, Montgomery, Polk, Robertson, San Jacinto, Trinity, Walker, Waller.
61	William T. "Bill" Moore	Brazos, Burleson, Chambers, Fayette, Freestone, Grimes, Houston, Lee, Leon, Liberty, Madison, Montgomery, Polk, Robertson, San Jacinto, Trinity, Walker, Waller.
62	William T. "Bill" Moore	Brazos, Burleson, Chambers, Fayette, Freestone, Grimes, Houston, Lee, Leon, Liberty, Madison, Montgomery, Robertson, San Jacinto, Trinity, Walker, Waller.
63	William T. "Bill" Moore	Austin, Brazos, Burleson, Colorado, Falls, Freestone, Grimes, Houston, Leon, Madison, Montgomery, Polk, Robertson, San Jacinto, Trinity, Walker, Waller, Washington, Wharton.
64	William T. "Bill" Moore	Austin, Brazos, Burleson, Colorado, Falls, Freestone, Grimes, Houston, Leon, Madison, Montgomery, Polk, Robertson, San Jacinto, Trinity, Walker, Waller, Washington, Wharton.
65	William T. "Bill" Moore	Austin, Brazos, Burleson, Colorado, Falls, Freestone, Grimes, Houston, Leon, Madison, Montgomery, Polk, Robertson, San Jacinto, Trinity, Walker, Waller, Washington, Wharton.
66	William T. "Bill" Moore	Austin, Brazos, Burleson, Colorado, Falls, Freestone, Grimes, Houston, Leon, Madison, Montgomery, Polk, Robertson, San Jacinto, Trinity, Walker, Waller, Washington, Wharton.
67	Kent A. Caperton	Austin, Brazos, Burleson, Colorado, Falls, Freestone, Grimes, Houston, Leon, Madison, Montgomery, Polk, Robertson, San Jacinto, Trinity, Walker, Waller, Washington, Wharton.
68	Kent A. Caperton	All of Austin, Brazos, Burleson, Colorado, Grimes, Houston, Leon, Madison, Milam, Robertson, Trinity, Walker, Waller, Washington, Wharton. Portions of Harris, Montgomery, Williamson.
69	Kent A. Caperton	All of Austin, Brazos, Burleson, Colorado, Grimes, Houston, Leon, Madison, Milam, Robertson, Trinity, Walker, Waller, Washington, Wharton. Portions of Harris, Montgomery, Williamson.
70	Kent A. Caperton	All of Austin, Brazos, Burleson, Colorado, Grimes, Houston, Leon, Madison, Milam, Robertson, Trinity, Walker, Waller, Washington, Wharton. Portions of Harris, Montgomery, Williamson.
71	Kent A. Caperton	All of Austin, Brazos, Burleson, Colorado, Grimes, Houston, Leon, Madison, Milam, Robertson, Trinity, Walker, Waller, Washington, Wharton. Portions of Harris, Montgomery, Williamson.
72	Jim Turner	All of Austin, Brazos, Burleson, Colorado, Grimes, Houston, Leon, Madison, Milam, Robertson, Trinity, Walker, Waller, Washington, Wharton. Portions of Harris, Montgomery, Williamson.
73	Jim Turner	Brazos, Burleson, Falls, Freestone, Grimes, Houston, Lee, Leon, Limestone, Madison, Milam, Robertson, Trinity, Walker, Waller, Washington, Williamson.
74	Jim Turner	All of Brazos, Burleson, Falls, Freestone, Grimes, Houston, Lee, Leon, Limestone, Madison, Milam, Navarro, Robertson, Trinity, Walker, Waller, Washington. Portions of McLennan, Williamson.
75	Steve Ogden	All of Brazos, Burleson, Falls, Freestone, Grimes, Houston, Lee, Leon, Limestone, Madison, Milam, Navarro, Robertson, Trinity, Walker, Waller, Washington. Portions of McLennan, Williamson.
76	Steve Ogden	All of Brazos, Burleson, Falls, Freestone, Grimes, Houston, Lee, Leon, Limestone, Madison, Milam, Navarro, Robertson, Trinity, Walker, Waller, Washington. Portions of McLennan, Williamson.
77	Steve Ogden	All of Brazos, Burleson, Falls, Freestone, Grimes, Houston, Lee, Leon, Limestone, Madison, Milam, Navarro, Robertson, Trinity, Walker, Waller, Washington. Portions of McLennan, Williamson.
78	Steve Ogden	Brazos, Burleson, Freestone, Grimes, Houston, Lee, Leon, Limestone, Madison, Milam, Robertson, Trinity, Walker, Williamson.
79	Steve Ogden	Brazos, Burleson, Freestone, Grimes, Houston, Lee, Leon, Limestone, Madison, Milam, Robertson, Trinity, Walker, Williamson.
80	Steve Ogden	Brazos, Burleson, Freestone, Grimes, Houston, Lee, Leon, Limestone, Madison, Milam, Robertson, Trinity, Walker, Williamson.
81	Steve Ogden	Brazos, Burleson, Freestone, Grimes, Houston, Lee, Leon, Limestone, Madison, Milam, Robertson, Trinity, Walker, Williamson.
82	Steve Ogden	Brazos, Burleson, Freestone, Grimes, Houston, Lee, Leon, Limestone, Madison, Milam, Robertson, Trinity, Walker, Williamson.
83	Charles Schwertner	Brazos, Freestone, Grimes, Leon, Limestone, Madison, Milam, Robertson, Walker, Williamson.
84	Charles Schwertner	Brazos, Freestone, Grimes, Leon, Limestone, Madison, Milam, Robertson, Walker, Williamson.
85	Charles Schwertner	Brazos, Freestone, Grimes, Leon, Limestone, Madison, Milam, Robertson, Walker, Williamson.
86	Charles Schwertner	Brazos, Freestone, Grimes, Leon, Limestone, Madison, Milam, Robertson, Walker, Williamson.
87	Charles Schwertner	Brazos, Freestone, Grimes, Leon, Limestone, Madison, Milam, Robertson, Walker, Williamson.
88	Charles Schwertner	All of Bastrop, Brazos, Freestone, Leon, Limestone, Madison, Milam, Robertson, San Jacinto, Walker. Portion of Williamson.
89	Charles Schwertner	All of Bastrop, Brazos, Freestone, Leon, Limestone, Madison, Milam, Robertson, San Jacinto, Walker. Portion of Williamson.
