= 73rd Texas Legislature =

The 73rd Texas Legislature met from January 12, 1993, to May 31, 1993. All members present during this session were elected in the 1992 general elections, with seats apportioned among the 1990 United States census.

== Sessions ==
Regular Session: January 12, 1993 - May 31, 1993

== Party summary ==
=== Senate ===
Affiliation	Members	Note
Democratic Party	18	
Republican Party	13	
Total	31	

=== House of Representatives ===
Affiliation	Members	Note
Democratic Party	91	
Republican Party	59	
Total	150	

== Officers ==
=== Senate ===
- Lieutenant Governor: Bob Bullock, Democrat
- President Pro Tempore: John T. Montford, Democrat

=== House ===
- Speaker of the House: Pete Laney, Democrat

== Members ==
=== Senate ===
Senator	Party	District	Home Town	Took office
Bill Ratliff	Republican	1	Mount Pleasant	1989
Florence Shapiro	Republican	2	Plano	1993
Bill Haley	Democratic	3	Center	1992
Carl A. Parker	Democratic	4	Port Arthur	1977
Jim Turner	Democratic	5	Crockett	1991
Dan Shelley	Republican	6	Crosby	1993
Don Henderson	Republican	7	Houston	1993
O.H. "Ike" Harris	Republican	8	Dallas	1967
David Sibley	Republican	9	Waco	1991
Chris Harris	Republican	10	Arlington	1991
Jerry E. Patterson	Republican	11	Houston	1993
Mike Moncrief	Democratic	12	Fort Worth	1991
Rodney Ellis	Democratic	13	Houston	1990
Gonzalo Barrientos	Democratic	14	Austin	1985
John Whitmire	Democratic	15	Houston	1983
John N. Leedom	Republican	16	Dallas	1981
J. E. "Buster" Brown	Republican	17	Lake Jackson	1981
Ken Armbrister	Democratic	18	Victoria	1987
Gregory Luna	Democratic	19	San Antonio	1985
Carlos F. Truan	Democratic	20	Corpus Christi	1977
Judith Zaffirini	Democratic	21	Laredo	1987
Jane Nelson	Republican	22	Lewisville	1993
Royce West	Democratic	23	Dallas	1993
Frank L. Madla	Democratic	24	San Antonio	1993
Bill Sims	Democratic	25	San Antonio	1983
Jeff Wentworth	Republican	26	San Antonio	1992
Eddie Lucio, Jr.	Democratic	27	Brownsville	1991
John Montford	Democratic	28	Lubbock	1982
Peggy Rosson	Democratic	29	El Paso	1991
Steve Carriker	Democratic	30	Roby	1988
Teel Bivins	Republican	31	Amarillo	1989

== Sources ==
http://www.tsl.state.tx.us/ref/abouttx/holidays.html

https://lrl.texas.gov/scanned/sessionOverviews/summary/soe73.pdf (Summary of Enactments for the 73rd Legislature)
