= 74th Texas Legislature =

The 74th Texas Legislature met from January 10, 1995, to May 29, 1995. All members present during this session were elected in the 1994 general elections.

== Sessions ==
Regular Session: January 10, 1995 - May 29, 1995

== Party summary ==
=== Senate ===
Affiliation	Members	Note
Democratic Party	17	
Republican Party	14	
Total	31	

=== House ===
Affiliation	Members	Note
Democratic Party	87	
Republican Party	63	
Total	150	

== Officers ==
=== Senate ===
- Lieutenant Governor: Bob Bullock, Democrat
- President Pro Tempore: Gonzalo Barrientos, Democrat

=== House ===
- Speaker of the House: Pete Laney, Democrat

== Members ==
=== Senate ===
Senator	Party	District	Home Town	Took office
Bill Ratliff	Republican	1	Mount Pleasant	1989
David Cain	Democratic	2	Dallas	1995
Drew Nixon	Republican	3	Carthage	1995
Michael Galloway	Republican	4	The Woodlands	1995
Jim Turner	Democratic	5	Crockett	1991
Mario Gallegos, Jr.	Democratic	6	Houston	1995
Don Henderson	Republican	7	Houston	1983
Florence Shapiro	Republican	8	Plano	1993
Jane Nelson	Republican	9	Flower Mound	1993
Chris Harris	Republican	10	Arlington	1991
Jerry E. Patterson	Republican	11	Pasadena	1993
Mike Moncrief	Democratic	12	Fort Worth	1991
Rodney Ellis	Democratic	13	Houston	1990
Gonzalo Barrientos	Democratic	14	Austin	1985
John Whitmire	Democratic	15	Houston	1983
John N. Leedom	Republican	16	Dallas	1981
J. E. "Buster" Brown	Republican	17	Lake Jackson	1981
Ken Armbrister	Democratic	18	Victoria	1987
Frank Madla	Democratic	19	San Antonio	1993
Carlos F. Truan	Democratic	20	Corpus Christi	1977
Judith Zaffirini	Democratic	21	Laredo	1987
David Sibley	Republican	22	Waco	1991
Royce West	Democratic	23	Dallas	1993
Bill Sims	Democratic	24	Paint Rock	1983
Jeff Wentworth	Republican	25	San Antonio	1993
Gregory Luna	Democratic	26	San Antonio	1993
Eddie Lucio, Jr.	Democratic	27	Brownsville	1991
John T. Montford	Democratic	28	Lubbock	1983
Peggy Rosson	Democratic	29	El Paso	1991
Tom Haywood	Republican	30	Wichita Falls	1995
Teel Bivins	Republican	31	Amarillo	1989

=== House ===
- Clyde Alexander
- Ray Allen
- Leo Alvarado, Jr.
- Kip Averitt
- Kevin Bailey
- Hugo Berlanga
- Dennis Bonnen
- Fred Bosse
- Kim Brimer
- Lon Burnam
- Bill Carter
- Norma Chavez
- Warren Chisum
- Wayne Christian
- Ron Clark
- Garnet Coleman
- Robert "Robby" Cook
- Frank Corte, Jr.
- David Counts
- Joe Crabb
- Tom Craddick
- Henry Cuellar
- John Culberson
- Debra Danburg
- Diana Davila
- Yvonne Davis
- Dianne White Delisi
- Mary Denny
- Joe Driver
- Dawnna Dukes
- Jim Dunnam
- Harold V. Dutton, Jr.
- Al Edwards
- Harryette Ehrhardt
- Craig Eiland
- Gary Elkins
- Jessica Farrar
- Charles Finnell
- Ismael "Kino" Flores
- Pete Gallego
- Carolyn Galloway
- Domingo Garcia
- Helen Giddings
- Bob Glaze
- Toby Goodman
- Tony Goolsby
- Patricia Gray
- Sherri Greenberg
- Kent Grusendorf
- Roberto Gutierrez
- Patrick "Pat" Haggerty
- Peggy Hamric
- Will Hartnett
- Judy Hawley
- Talmadge Heflin
- Christine Hernandez
- Allen Hightower
- Paul Hilbert
- Harvey Hilderbran
- Fred Hill
- Juan "Chuy" Hinojosa
- John Hirschi
- Scott Hochberg
- Terri Hodge
- Steve Holzheauser
- Jim Horn
- Charlie Howard
- Bob Hunter
- Suzanna Gratia Hupp
- Carl Isett
- Mike Jackson
- Kyle L. Janek
- Delwin Jones
- Jesse Jones
- Robert Junell
- Ted Kamel
- Terry Keel
- Jim Keffer
- Tracy O. King
- Mike Krusee
- Dan Kubiak
- Edmund Kuempel
- James E. "Pete" Laney
- Glenn Lewis
- Ron Lewis
- John Longoria
- Vilma Luna
- Jerry Madden
- Kenny Marchant
- Glen Maxey
- Brian McCall
- Ruth Jones McClendon
- Jim McReynolds
- Tommy Merritt
- Nancy Moffat
- Paul Moreno
- Anna Mowery
- Elliott Naishtat
- Joe Nixon
- Keith Oakley
- Steve Ogden
- René O. Oliveira
- Dora Olivo
- Sue Palmer
- Pete Patterson
- Joe C. Pickett
- Jim Pitts
- Allen Place
- Albert Price
- Robert Puente
- Bob Rabuck
- Tom Ramsay
- Irma Rangel
- Richard Peña Raymond
- Arthur "Art" Reyna
- Elvira Reyna
- Alec Rhodes
- Ciro Rodriguez
- Bill Roman
- Paul Sadler
- Gene Seaman
- Gilbert Serna
- John Shields
- Bill Siebert
- Todd Smith
- John Smithee
- Jim Solis
- Burt Solomons
- Todd Staples
- Mark Stiles
- David Swinford
- Robert Talton
- Barry Telford
- Senfronia Thompson
- Dale Tillery
- Gerard Torres
- Bob Turner
- Sylvester Turner
- D.R. 'Tom' Uher
- Leticia Van de Putte
- Gary Walker
- G.E. 'Buddy' West
- Tommy Williams
- Ric Williamson
- Ron Wilson
- Miguel "Mike" Wise
- Arlene Wohlgemuth
- Steven Wolens
- Beverly Woolley
- Ken Yarbrough
- Zeb Zbranek
