= 72nd Texas Legislature =

The 72nd Texas Legislature met from January 8, 1991, to May 27, 1991, and in four subsequent special called sessions. All members present during this session were elected in the 1990 general elections.

== Sessions ==
Regular Session: January 8, 1991 - May 27, 1991
1st Called Session: July 15, 1991 - August 13, 1991
2nd Called Session: August 19, 1991 - August 25, 1991
3rd Called Session: January 2, 1992 - January 8, 1992
4th Called Session: November 10, 1992 - December 3, 1992

== Party summary ==
=== Senate ===
Affiliation	Members	Note
Democratic Party	22	
Republican Party	9	
Total	31	

=== House of Representatives ===
Affiliation	Members	Note
Democratic Party	90	
Republican Party	60	
Total	150	

== Officers ==
=== Senate ===
- Lieutenant Governor: Bob Bullock, Democrat
- President Pro Tempore (regular session): Bob Glasgow, Democrat
- President Pro Tempore (1st called session): Don Henderson, Republican
- President Pro Tempore (2nd called session): Don Henderson, Republican
- President Pro Tempore (3rd called session): Bill Sims, Democrat
- President Pro Tempore (4th called session): Bill Sims, Democrat

=== House ===
- Speaker of the House: Gibson D. "Gib" Lewis, Democrat

== Members ==
=== Senate ===
Senator	Party	District	Home Town	Took office
Bill Ratliff	Republican	1	Mount Pleasant	1989
Ted Lyon	Democratic	2	Mesquite	1991
Bill Haley	Democratic	3	Center	1991
Carl A. Parker	Democratic	4	Port Arthur	1977
Jim Turner	Democratic	5	Crockett	1991
Gene Green	Democratic	6	Houston	1987
Don Henderson	Republican	7	Houston	1991
O.H. "Ike" Harris	Republican	8	Dallas	1967
David Sibley	Republican	9	Waco	1991
Chris Harris	Republican	10	Arlington	1991
Chet Brooks	Democratic	11	Pasadena	1967
Mike Moncrief	Democratic	12	Fort Worth	1991
Rodney Ellis	Democratic	13	Houston	1990
Gonzalo Barrientos	Democratic	14	Austin	1985
John Whitmire	Democratic	15	Houston	1983
John N. Leedom	Republican	16	Dallas	1981
J. E. "Buster" Brown	Republican	17	Lake Jackson	1981
Ken Armbrister	Democratic	18	Victoria	1987
Frank Tejeda	Democratic	19	San Antonio	1987
Carlos F. Truan	Democratic	20	Corpus Christi	1977
Judith Zaffirini	Democratic	21	Laredo	1987
Bob Glasgow	Democratic	22	Stephenville	1980
Eddie Bernice Johnson	Democratic	23	Dallas	1987
Robert Temple Dickson III	Democratic	24	San Antonio	1989
Bill Sims	Democratic	25	San Antonio	1983
Cyndi Taylor Krier	Republican	26	San Antonio	1985
Eddie Lucio, Jr.	Democratic	27	Brownsville	1991
John Montford	Democratic	28	Lubbock	1982
Peggy Rosson	Democratic	29	El Paso	1991
Steve Carriker	Democratic	30	Roby	1988
Teel Bivins	Republican	31	Amarillo	1989

== Sources ==
http://www.tsl.state.tx.us/ref/abouttx/holidays.html

http://www.lrl.state.tx.us/scanned/sessionOverviews/summary/soe70.pdf
