= 13th Texas Legislature =

The 13th Texas Legislature met from January 14 to June 4, 1873 in its regular session. All members of the Texas House of Representatives and about half of the members of the Texas Senate were elected in 1872.

== Sessions ==
- 13th Regular session: January 14–June 4, 1873

== Officers ==
=== Senate ===
Lieutenant Governor
Vacant
President pro tempore (Lieutenant Governor ex officio)
Edward Bradford Pickett, Democrat

=== House of Representatives ===
Speaker of the House
M. D. K. Taylor, Democrat

== Members ==
Members of the Thirteenth Texas Legislature at the beginning of the Regular Session, January 14, 1873:

=== Senate ===
District	Senator	Party	Took office
1	Edward Bradford Pickett	Democrat	1870
2	William H. Swift	Democrat	1871
3	James Elizer Dillard	Democrat	1871
4	Thomas J. Word	Democrat	1872
5	David Webster Flanagan	Republican	1870
6	John Lane Henry	Democrat	1872
7	Henry Rawson	Republican	1870
8	Hamilton J. Avinger	Democrat	1872
9	Henry Russell Latimer	Democrat	1870
10	David W. Cole	Democrat	1870
11	Ebenezer Lafayette Dohoney	Democrat	1870
12	George Thompson Ruby	Republican	1870
13	Francis J. Franks	Republican	1872
14	James G. Tracy	Republican	1872
15	Edward T. Randle	Republican	1872
16	Matthew Gaines	Republican	1870
17	William A. Saylor	Republican	1870
18	Phidello W. Hall	Republican	1870
19	S. W. Ford	Republican	1870
20	William H. Pyle	Democrat	1870
21	Samuel Evans		1870
22	E. Thomas Broughton		1870
23	Andrew J. Ball	Democrat	1872
24	George Preston Finlay	Democrat	1872 (Prior: 1861–1863)
25	Robert P. Tendick	Republican	1871
26	Joseph D. Sayers	Democrat	1872
27	Thomas H. Baker	Republican	1870
28	Nathan George Shelley	Democrat	1872 (Prior: 1861–1863, 1865–1867)
29	Henry C. King	Democrat	1872
30	Albert Jennings Fountain	Republican	1870

=== House of Representatives ===
- C. L. Abbott
- John Adriance
- Richard Allen
- Thomas G. Allison
- Em Anderson
- James Monroe Anderson
- James Armstrong
- Julius Berends
- Samuel Bewley
- W.S. Bledsoe
- Augustus J. Booty
- Richard Bordeaux
- A. S. Broaddus
- Bluford Brown
- John Henry Brown
- Edward Chambers
- John Carroll
- Gustave Cook
- John Cunningham
- Overton Fletcher Davenport
- Samuel Day
- Ashley Denton
- Peter Diller
- John N. Doyle
- James Eastland
- W. A. Ellett
- Henry Harrison Ford
- Louis Frankee
- C.C. Galloway
- Robert Gaston
- Henry Clay Ghent (Seventeenth District, including Bell and Milam Counties)
- Levi Gillette
- Henry Addington Gilpin
- William Greene
- James Marshall Harrison
- Thomas Hester
- Gustav V. Hoffmann
- Orlando Newton Hollingsworth
- John Ireland
- Thomas M. Joseph
- Josiah Kemble
- Ira Killough
- Marcellus Kleberg
- William Lane
- Johann Frederic Leyendecker
- Abner Smith Lipscomb
- William Mabry
- Hilary Manning
- John M. McDonald
- F.A. Michael
- J. S. Mills
- Henry Moore
- William Morris
- Hudson Nelson
- Julius Noeggerath
- Jonathan Payne
- Henry Phelps
- Stephen Powers
- Davis M. Prendergast
- Frank Rainey
- Burlington Wesley Rimes
- Sam Robb
- Shack Roberts
- David Decatur Rosborough
- Alexander Rossey
- Jonathan Russell
- Chauncey Brewer Sabin
- Charles Partin Salter
- William Sayers
- Erich F. Schmidt
- Preston Scott
- Edward Sharp
- W.A. Shaw
- Eli Shelton
- Daniel Short
- George Washington Smith
- John T. Smith
- Leonidas Jefferson Storey
- Charles Stockbridge
- M. D. K. Taylor
- Alfred Sturgis Thurmond
- William Tilson
- Joseph Albert Tivy
- John Files Tom
- William H. Trolinger
- K. M. Van Zandt
- William Veale
- Stephen Venters
- U.G. Mitchell Walker
- James H. Washington
- Arthur Thomas Watts
- William Westfall
- Allen W. Wilder
- Richard Williams
- Clinton McKamy Winkler
- William Daniel Wood

Representative Allen was apparently re-elected, but House Democrats alleged voting fraud and seated his Democratic opponent instead.
