= Kuempel =

Kuempel is a surname. Notable people with the surname include:

- Edmund Kuempel (1942–2010), American politician
- John Kuempel (born 1970), American politician

== See also ==
- Kempele
- Krempel
