= Gregory Luna =

American politician (1932–1999)

Member of the Texas Senate from the 26th district
- Succeeded by: Leticia Van de Putte

Member of the Texas House of Representatives from the 116th district
- In office 1985–1993

Personal details
- Born: 17 November 1932
- Died: November 6, 1999 (aged 66)
- Party: Democratic

Gregorio "Gregory" Luna(17 November 1932 – 6 November 1999) was a San Antonio, Texas politician who served as a Democrat in both the Texas House of Representatives and the Texas Senate for the 14 years from 1985 to 1999. While in the legislature, Luna was considered to be a "champion of education". He was also one of the founders of the Mexican American Legal Defense and Education Fund, and served four terms as board chair.

== Early life ==
Luna was born to Eliseo and Elvira Luna in New Braunfels, Texas, the youngest of their eight children. When Gregory was seven months old, Eliseo Luna died and, shortly afterward, the family moved to San Antonio.Also brother of Federico Luna a civil rights activist in New Braunfels who fought discrimination in the 1940s While growing up, Luna worked as a restaurant bus boy, a grocery-store sacker and in the mailroom at the San Antonio Express.

At 21, after attending San Antonio College briefly, Luna enlisted in the United States Army and served a short stint, advancing to the rank of corporal. After his service, he joined the San Antonio Police Department. While an officer, Luna attended night classes and graduated from Trinity University with a Bachelor of Arts in math and St. Mary's University School of Law with a law degree. While an officer, Luna also helped train police officers in Venezuela as part of a U.S. government program. Luna began his law career as a prosecutor for the City of San Antonio, and opened a started a private law practice in 1968.

Luna married Helen Garcia 21 August 1955 and had two sons and two daughters.

== Political career ==
In 1969, Luna unsuccessfully ran for Justice of the Peace in Bexar County. In 1982, he ran for the District 116 Texas House seat, losing to Joe A. Gamez in the Democratic Party primary election. In 1984, Luna sought the same House seat again, this time successfully. He represented San Antonio from 1985 to 1993 in the Texas House.

In 1992, when then-state Senator Frank Tejeda opted to make a run for U.S. Congress, Luna sought Tejeda's senate seat in District 19. He defeated the Republican challenger, auto dealer Ernesto Ancira for the four-year term.

A Democratic redistricting plan (which also altered district numbering) necessitated all state senators to run for reelection in 1994, and as a result, Luna faced an unsuccessful challenge from Republican Andrew Longaker for the remaining two years of his term, this time in District 26. In 1996, Luna again fended off a challenge from Longaker, this time for a four-year term.

Luna missed most of the regular session of the 76th Legislature due to ill health. He was ailing from complications related to diabetes, which eventually required the amputation of both his legs. Citing his ill health, Luna resigned his senate seat on 24 September 1999. Luna died peacefully after midnight 6 November 1999 at a hospice inpatient center in San Antonio, where he had been for three weeks. He was buried in the Texas State Cemetery on 9 November 1999.

Luna is honored by the Texas Senate Hispanic Research Council through the Senator Gregory Luna Legislative Scholar and Fellows Program which places college students with members of the Texas Senate to gain leadership experience.

== Election history ==
Senate election history of Luna.

=== Most recent election ===
==== 1996 ====
Texas general election, 1996: Senate District 26
Party	Candidate	Votes	%	±%
Republican	Andrew Longaker	41,298	32.46	−4.26
Democratic	Gregory Luna (Incumbent)	85,922	67.54	+4.26
Majority		44,624	35.07	+8.51
Turnout		127,220		
Democratic hold				

=== Previous elections ===
==== 1994 ====
Texas general election, 1994: Senate District 26
Party	Candidate	Votes	%	±%
Democratic	Gregory Luna (Incumbent)	55,799	63.28	
Republican	Andrew Longaker	32,375	36.71	
Majority		23,424	26.56	
Turnout		88,174		
Democratic gain from Republican				

==== 1992 ====
Texas general election, 1992: Senate District 19
Party	Candidate	Votes	%	±%
Democratic	Gregory Luna	86,742	50.94	
Republican	Ernesto Ancira	76,967	45.20	
Libertarian	James "Ted" Bonnet	6,551	3.84	
Majority		9,775	5.54	
Turnout		176,260		
Democratic hold				

Texas House of Representatives
Preceded by Joe A. Gamez	Member of the Texas House of Representatives from District 116 (San Antonio); 1985–1993	Succeeded by Leo Alvarado Jr.
Texas Senate
Preceded by Frank Tejeda	Texas State Senator from District 19 (San Antonio); 1993–1995	Succeeded by Frank L. Madla
Preceded by Jeff Wentworth	Texas State Senator from District 26 (San Antonio); 1995–1999	Succeeded by Leticia R. Van de Putte
