= Nathan Shelley =

Nathan Shelley may refer to:

- Nathan George Shelley, Texas politician
- Nathan Shelley, fictional character in Ted Lasso
