= Jeff Wentworth =

American politician (born 1940)

Member of the Texas Senate from the 25th district
- In office 1997–2013
- Preceded by: William "Bill" Sims
- Succeeded by: Donna Campbell

Member of the Texas Senate from the 26th district
- In office 1993–1997
- Preceded by: Cyndi Taylor Krier
- Succeeded by: Gregory Luna

State Representative from Texas District 123 (Bexar County)
- In office May 11, 1988 – January 12, 1993
- Preceded by: Kae T. Patrick
- Succeeded by: Frank J. Corte Jr.

Personal details
- Born: Earl Jeffrey Wentworth; November 20, 1940 (age 85) Mercedes, Texas, U.S.
- Party: Republican
- Spouse: Karleen Rae "Karla" L. Wentworth
- Children: 2
- Education: Texas A&M University; Texas Tech University
- Profession: Attorney

Earl Jeffrey Wentworth (born November 20, 1940) is a Republican former member of the Texas Senate from San Antonio. He represented District 25 in the upper legislative chamber from January 1997 to January 2013. In addition, from 1993 to 1997, he represented District 26, having been initially elected to the state senate in 1992 to succeed fellow Republican Cyndi Taylor Krier, when she became the county judge of Bexar County. District 25 included northern portions of Bexar County, all of Comal, Guadalupe, Hays, and Kendall counties, and a part of southern Travis County.

From 1988 to 1993, Wentworth was a member of the Texas House of Representatives from District 123. He won a special election on May 7, 1988, called when Republican Representative Kae T. Patrick of San Antonio resigned during his fourth term.

In 2010, Wentworth wrote to Chairman Ron Blatchley (Chairman of the Texas State University System Board of Regents) a scathing letter from a sitting State Senator expressing his unhappiness with the Texas State University System Board of Regents decision to appoint State Rep. Brian McCall as the Chancellor of the Texas State University System over him. In the letter, Wentworth expressed a strong disagreement with McCall's appointment and repeatedly states that he authored the bill that changed the name of Southwest Texas State University (SWT) to Texas State University-San Marcos (TSU-SM) - an unpopular bill among the vast majority of SWT alumni with suggestions throughout he expected this appointment in part due to carrying this legislation, having it killed in one sub-committee, re-introducing the bill in a rush before another unrelated sub-committee to finally get it passed. Opposition to the bill was not limited to SWT alumni but also included dozens and dozens of Texas Southern University (TSU) faculty, students and alumni aligned with SWT alumni.

In 2012, Wentworth was defeated in his bid for re-nomination. In the Republican primary runoff held on July 31, he lost to Tea Party candidate Donna Campbell, who amassed 45,292 votes (66.2 percent) to Wentworth's 23,168 (33.8 percent).

Wentworth and his wife Karla, a licensed professional interior designer, have two sons, Jason and Matthew Wentworth. After his term in the state Senate, Wentworth was appointed to the position of Precinct 3 justice of the peace by the Bexar County Commission.

In 2026, a dispute between Wentworth and his neighbor over her fence was featured on the television show Neighbors.

== Election history ==
Senate election history of Wentworth.

=== 2012 ===
Republican primary, 2012: Senate District 25
| Candidate | | Votes | % | ± |
|---|---|---|---|---|
| ✓ | Donna Campbell | 45,292 | 66.15% | |
| | Jeff Wentworth (Incumbent) | 23,168 | 33.84% | |
| Majority | | | | |
| Turnout | | 68,460 | | |

=== 2010 ===
Texas general election, 2010: Senate District 25
| Party | Candidate | Votes | % | ±% |
|---|---|---|---|---|
| Republican | Jeff Wentworth (Incumbent) | 192,965 | 82.17 | not reported |
| Libertarian | Arthur Maxwell Thomas, IV | 40,972 | 17.44 | not reported |
| Independent | Eric R. Anderson | 885 | 0.37 | not reported |
| Democratic | No candidate on ballot | 0 | 0 | not reported |
| Turnout | | 234,822 | not reported | not reported |

=== 2006 ===
Texas general election, 2006: Senate District 25
| Party | Candidate | Votes | % | ±% |
|---|---|---|---|---|
| Republican | Jeff Wentworth (Incumbent) | 132,872 | 58.32 | −8.41 |
| Democratic | Kathleen "Kathi" Thomas | 84,816 | 37.23 | +7.03 |
| Libertarian | James R. "Bob" Thompson | 10,137 | 4.45 | +1.38 |
| Majority | | 48,056 | 21.09 | −15.45 |
| Turnout | | 227,825 | | +11.14 |
| Republican hold | | | | |

=== 2002 ===
Texas general election, 2002: Senate District 25
| Party | Candidate | Votes | % | ±% |
|---|---|---|---|---|
| Republican | Jeff Wentworth (Incumbent) | 136,802 | 66.73 | −20.70 |
| Democratic | Joseph "Joe" P. Sullivan | 61,899 | 30.20 | +17.63 |
| Libertarian | Rex Black | 6,293 | 3.07 | +3.07 |
| Majority | | 74,903 | 36.54 | −38.32 |
| Turnout | | 204,994 | | −36.86 |
| Republican hold | | | | |

Republican primary, 2002: Senate District 25
| Candidate | | Votes | % | ± |
|---|---|---|---|---|
| | John H. Shields | 25,265 | 48.83 | |
| ✓ | Jeff Wentworth (Incumbent) | 26,481 | 51.17 | |
| Majority | | 1,216 | 2.35 | |
| Turnout | | 51,746 | | |

=== 2000 ===
Texas general election, 2000: Senate District 25
| Party | Candidate | Votes | % | ±% |
|---|---|---|---|---|
| Republican | Jeff Wentworth (Incumbent) | 283,857 | 87.43 | −12.57 |
| Libertarian | George Meeks | 40,806 | 12.57 | +12.57 |
| Majority | | 243,051 | 74.86 | −25.14 |
| Turnout | | 324,663 | | +45.11 |
| Republican hold | | | | |

=== 1996 ===
Texas general election, 1996: Senate District 25
| Party | Candidate | Votes | % | ±% |
|---|---|---|---|---|
| Republican | Jeff Wentworth (Incumbent) | 223,739 | 100.00 | +24.97 |
| Majority | | 223,739 | 100.00 | +46.58 |
| Turnout | | 223,739 | | +5.10 |
| Republican hold | | | | |

Republican primary, 1996: Senate District 25
| Candidate | | Votes | % | ± |
|---|---|---|---|---|
| | Randy Staudt | 24,930 | 29.54 | |
| ✓ | Jeff Wentworth (Incumbent) | 59,476 | 70.46 | |
| Majority | | 34,546 | 40.93 | |
| Turnout | | 84,406 | | |

=== 1994 ===
Texas general election, 1994: Senate District 25
| Party | Candidate | Votes | % | ±% |
|---|---|---|---|---|
| Democratic | Jim Saunders | 53,152 | 24.97 | −26.78 |
| Republican | Jeff Wentworth (Incumbent) | 159,729 | 75.03 | +26.78 |
| Majority | | 106,577 | 50.06 | +46.58 |
| Turnout | | | | |
| Republican gain from Democratic | | | | |

Republican primary, 1994: Senate District 25
| Candidate | | Votes | % | ± |
|---|---|---|---|---|
| | Van Archer | 21,341 | 39.66 | |
| ✓ | Jeff Wentworth (Incumbent) | 32,473 | 60.34 | |
| Majority | | 11,132 | 20.69 | |
| Turnout | | 53,814 | | |

=== 1992 ===
Texas general election, 1992: Senate District 26
| Party | Candidate | Votes | % | ±% |
|---|---|---|---|---|
| Democratic | Carlos Higgins | 73,303 | 33.40 | |
| Republican | Jeff Wentworth | 146,159 | 66.60 | |
| Majority | | 72,856 | 33.20 | |
| Turnout | | 219,462 | | |
| Republican hold | | | | |

Republican primary runoff, 1992: Senate District 26
| Candidate | | Votes | % | ± |
|---|---|---|---|---|
| | Alan Schoolcraft | 10,388 | 47.30 | +12.59 |
| ✓ | Jeff Wentworth | 11,574 | 52.70 | +18.98 |
| Majority | | 1,186 | 5.40 | |
| Turnout | | 21,962 | | |

Republican primary, 1992: Senate District 26
| Candidate | | Votes | % | ± |
|---|---|---|---|---|
| | Jim Canady | 1,547 | 3.71 | |
| | John Fisher | 7,222 | 17.30 | |
| | George Boyd Pierce | 4,407 | 10.56 | |
| ✓ | Alan Schoolcraft | 14,490 | 34.71 | |
| ✓ | Jeff Wentworth | 14,076 | 33.72 | |
| Turnout | | 41,742 | | |

Texas House of Representatives
| Preceded by Kae T. Patrick | Member of the Texas House of Representatives from District 123 (San Antonio); 1988 – 1993 | Succeeded by Frank Corte Jr. |
Texas Senate
| Preceded by Cyndi Taylor Krier | Texas State Senator from District 26 (San Antonio); 1993 – 1995 | Succeeded by Gregory Luna |
| Preceded by Bill Sims | Texas State Senator from District 25 (San Antonio); 1995 - 2013 | Succeeded by Donna Campbell |
| Preceded by Jane Nelson | President pro tempore of the Texas Senate; 20 April 2004–11 January 2005 | Succeeded by Florence Shapiro |
