= Fletcher Stockdale =

American politician (c. 1823 – 1890)

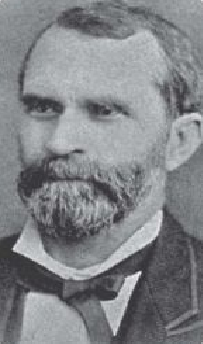

Acting Governor of Texas
- In office June 11, 1865 – June 16, 1865
- Preceded by: Pendleton Murrah
- Succeeded by: Andrew Jackson Hamilton

9th Lieutenant Governor of Texas
- In office November 5, 1863 – June 16, 1865
- Governor: Pendleton Murrah
- Preceded by: John McClannahan Crockett
- Succeeded by: George Washington Jones

Personal details
- Born: Fletcher Summerfield Stockdale; 1823 Russellville, Kentucky, U.S.
- Died: February 4, 1890 (aged 66–67) Cuero, Texas, U.S.
- Party: Democratic
- Spouses: Elizabeth Pryor Bankhead Lytle (m. 1857; died 1865) Elizabeth Schleicher (m. 1877)
- Children: 3
- Profession: Politician, lawyer, railroad official

Fletcher Summerfield Stockdale (c. 1823 – 4 February 1890) was an American politician, lawyer, and railroad official who served as the acting governor of Texas in 1865 and as the ninth lieutenant governor of Texas from 1863 to 1865.

== Early life ==
Stockdale was born in either 1823 or 1825 in Russellville, Kentucky as one of eight children of Thomas W. and Laurinda Stockdale.

== Political career ==
He studied law and was admitted to the Bar in Kentucky. Stockdale moved to Texas in 1846 and settled in Grimes County.

By 1856, Stockdale had moved to Calhoun County, which he represented in the Texas Senate from 1857 to 1861. Stockdale was an executive member of the 1861 Secession Convention that was held in Austin. During 1862 and 1863 he held the position of aide to Governor Francis R. Lubbock.

=== Political executive ===
He was elected Lieutenant Governor in 1863, and served in that post until late May 1865 when he became the acting governor of Texas after then-Governor Pendleton Murrah fled to Mexico. Stockdale filled the vacant post of Governor for five days until provisional governor Andrew J. Hamilton assumed office in June 1865.

Stockdale had served Texas during very troubling times. Lawlessness, Indian attacks, and severe deterioration of the government during the American Civil War had plagued his 18-month tenure as a political executive in Texas.

Stockdale was again a member of the Texas State Senate in 1868. In 1875, during the Texas Constitutional Convention, he served on the committees of judiciary & land grants and participated in various debates to establish a free public school system in Texas. He served as a delegate to the national Democratic conventions of 1872, 1876, and 1880.

Stockdale was selected as one of the Texas Democratic convention's vice presidents of 1873. In 1876, 1882 and 1888, Stockdale was a member of the committee on resolutions and platforms at the Texas Democratic convention, where he chaired the committee in 1876.

=== Railroad official ===
In the late 1860s, Stockdale served as president of the Indianola Railroad and promoted the development of refrigerated cars for carrying beef to markets.

== Later life and family ==
Stockdale's first wife, Elizabeth Pryor Bankhead Lytle, died on April 17, 1865.

Stockdale married his second wife, Elizabeth Schleicher, the daughter of Texas politician Gustav Schleicher, on July 11, 1877, in Washington, D.C. They had three children. They resided in Cuero, Texas, until his death on February 4, 1890.

== Legacy ==
Stockdale, Texas, in Wilson County was named in his honor.

Texas Senate
Preceded by Samuel Addison White	Texas State Senator from District 26; 1857–1861	Succeeded by Nathan George Shelley
Political offices
Preceded by John McClannahan Crockett	Lieutenant Governor of Texas; 1863–1865	Succeeded by George Washington Jones
Preceded by Pendleton Murrah	Governor of Texas; 1865–1865	Succeeded by Andrew J. Hamilton
