= Robert P. Tendick =

American politician (1839–1888)

Robert Peter Tendick (June 19, 1839- November 3, 1888) was a state legislator in Texas. A Republican, he served in the Texas Senate during the 12th and 13th Texas legislatures. He was labeled a Radical Republican. He lived in Columbus, Texas.

He was born in Prussia. He lived in Illinois and then Missouri.

He served in the Union Army and was stationed in Texas after it ended. Columbus was highly partisan and Tendick was outspoken in his criticism of Democrats. The area's population included Germans and African Americans. Jewish merchants also established businesses in the area. Tensions between Republicans and Democrats were high and there was violence, including against the African-American population. In 1871, the Colorado Citizen, a Democrat Party aligned newspaper, called him "an adventurer, who by fraud, occupies a seat in the State Senate." It stated, "I would suggest to this swindler . . . that there is a vacant cell in the State penitentiary awaiting him." After his time in office he was appointed postmaster and tended his store. The Colorado Citizen praised his innovative management practices.

He married. He eventually moved to San Antonio, Texas where he managed the San Antonio Brewing Association.

== See also ==
- Texas Senate, District 25
- 12th Texas Legislature
- 13th Texas Legislature
- Reconstruction era
