= Texas's 44th House of Representatives district =

American legislative district

Texas's 44th State House of Representatives district
Representative
| Alan Schoolcraft; R–Seguin |

District 44 is a district in the Texas House of Representatives. It has been represented by Republican Alan Schoolcraft since 2025.

== Geography ==
The district covers Gonzales County and Guadalupe County.

== Members ==
- Edmund Kuempel (1983–2011)
- John Kuempel (2011–2025)
- Alan Schoolcraft (since 2025)
