= Donna Campbell =

American physician and politician (born 1954)

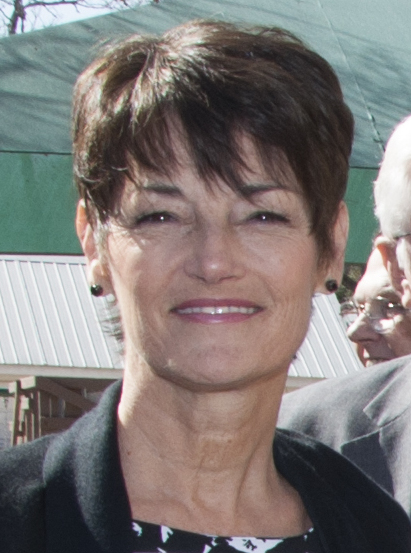
- Campbell in 2016

President pro tempore of the Texas Senate
- In office May 31, 2021 – January 10, 2023
- Preceded by: Brian Birdwell
- Succeeded by: Kelly Hancock

Member of the Texas Senate from the 25th district
- Incumbent
- Assumed office January 8, 2013
- Preceded by: Jeff Wentworth

Personal details
- Born: Donna Sue Burrows; September 17, 1954 (age 71) San Diego, California, U.S.
- Party: Republican
- Children: 4
- Education: University of Central Oklahoma (BS); Texas Woman's University (MS); Texas Tech University (MD)
- Website: Office website Campaign website

Donna Sue Campbell (née Burrows; born September 17, 1954) is an American politician and physician who is the 25th district member of the Texas Senate. On July 31, 2012, she became the first person in Texas history to defeat an incumbent Republican senator, Jeff Wentworth of San Antonio, in a primary election.

Her district represents all of Blanco County, Comal County, and Kendall County, and portions of Guadalupe County, Hays County, Bexar, and Travis counties.

== Early life and education ==
Campbell was born on the naval base in San Diego, California, and reared in Oklahoma. Her father served in the U.S. Navy and later as a trooper in the highway patrol. Her mother was a factory worker for much of her life but became a registered nurse at the age of forty-eight.

Campbell obtained her undergraduate degree in nursing from Central State University in Edmond, Oklahoma. Campbell earned her Masters of Nursing from Texas Woman's University. She specialized in cardiovascular clinical nursing and nursing administration.

She received her M.D. from Texas Tech University Health Sciences Center in Lubbock in May 1989 and completed an internship in general surgery at Methodist Hospital in Dallas from 1989 to 1990. She completed her residency at the University of Texas Medical Center in Houston from 1990 to 1993.

== Medical career ==
Campbell is the medical director of the emergency department at Columbus Community Hospital in Columbus, Texas, a city west of Houston.

Campbell is a member of the American Academy of Physician Specialists and the Texas Medical Association.

Campbell has volunteered her time and expertise to perform hundreds of eye surgeries in Ghana, West Africa, working through the Christian Eye Ministry, an organization which focuses its efforts to bring back sight to people living in Africa.

== Tenure ==
On her first day in the legislature, an aide to Senator John Whitmire passed out and Campbell provided assistance.

Campbell was named the vice-chair of Nominations Committee and given a seat on the Education and Transportation Committees of the Senate.

=== Political positions ===
Campbell is conservative. Campbell is also pro-life. Texas Governor Rick Perry and Campbell support a proposed 2013 law, one that would restrict abortions after the twentieth week of pregnancy, place abortion clinics in the same regulatory category as other ambulatory surgery centers, and require doctors who perform abortions have admitting privileges at a hospital within thirty miles of the facility where they perform abortions.

On the last day of the regular legislative session in 2017, Democrat Jose Menendez of San Antonio used a filibuster to kill Campbell's bill which would have made it more difficult for municipalities to annex surrounding territory.

In 2019, Campbell expressed opposition to expanding medical marijuana to cover post-traumatic stress. She claimed that a study had shown that 70% of veterans who committed suicide had cannabis in their system; PolitiFact rated her assertion false and said it could find no such study.

Although an adoptive mother, Campbell has long opposed the right of adult adopted people to obtain copies of their own pre-adoption original birth records.

In 2021, Campbell responded to the rise in mass shootings in Texas with a bill to furnish families with fingerprint and DNA kits, which could be used to identify their dead children. After the 2022 Robb Elementary School mass shooting, the Texas Education Agency began to furnish school districts with these kits.

== Personal life ==
Campbell has four adopted daughters. They live in New Braunfels, Texas

== Election results ==
=== 2010 election results ===
Campbell, running as the "Tea Party favorite", lost to U.S. Representative Lloyd Doggett by an eight percent margin in the 2010 Congressional election for the 25th District Congressional seat.

US House election, 2010: Texas District 25
Party	Candidate	Votes	%	±%
Democratic	Lloyd Doggett	99,853	53	−14.6
Republican	Donna Campbell	84,780	45	+14.3
Libertarian	Jim Stutsman	4,424	2	+0.3
Democratic hold		Swing	-14.5	

=== 2012 election results ===
Republican primary, Texas Senate District 25, May 29, 2012

In the Republican primary on May 29, 2012, for Texas Senate District 25, Campbell came in second, advancing to the runoff. Elizabeth Ames Jones, the former Railroad Commissioner was eliminated from the runoff. The incumbent, Jeff Wentworth, who was in the Texas Senate for more than two decades, led the voting with 27,040 votes; Campbell followed with 25,458 primary votes. With 23,075 votes, Jones finished in a strong third place in the primary.

In the Republican primary, Wentworth spent $727,568. Campbell spent about $175,000. And Jones, who had the backing of Texans for Lawsuit Reform's political action committee, spent $1,754,310.

Republican primary, May 29, 2012: Senate District 25
Candidate		Votes	%	±
✓	Donna Campbell	25,470	33.7%	
✓	Jeff Wentworth (Incumbent)	27,050	35.8%	
	Elizabeth Ames Jones	23,085	30.5%	
Turnout		75,605		

Republican primary runoff, Texas Senate District 25, July 31, 2012

Republican political strategist Allen Blakemore joined Campbell's team and helped Campbell defeat incumbent Jeff Wentworth, who was in the Texas Senate for over two decades, by a two-to-one margin in the state Senate primary runoff on July 31, 2012. Campbell defeated Wentworth in every county in the 25th District except the portion of the district in southern Travis County. She built upon the base of support she gathered during the 2010 run for Congress to create the numbers that she needed to finish second in the Republican primary on May 29 and to win the July 31 Republican primary runoff against Wentworth. After the results were announced Campbell stated, "People were tired of the status quo government – that's the folks who came out and voted for us. We have a large grass-roots movement. People identified with our message: smaller government, lower taxes and a vision for having a strong economy with job creation in the private sector." Campbell also stated that she believed that she benefited from the endorsement of Ted Cruz. Others saw her win as a victory for the Tea Party over the establishment Republicans.

Republican primary runoff, 2012: Senate District 25
Candidate		Votes	%	±
✓	Donna Campbell	45,292	66.2%	
	Jeff Wentworth (Incumbent)	23,168	33.8%	
Turnout		68,460		

General election, Texas Senate District 25, November 6, 2012

In the general election for the Texas Senate District 25 of November 6, 2012, Campbell won a victory over John Courage, a high school teacher from San Antonio. Campbell easily out-spent Courage and took two-thirds of the votes.

General election, Texas Senate District 25, November 6, 2012: Senate District 25
Candidate		Votes	%	±
✓	Donna Campbell	232,261	65.6%	
	John Courage	121,906	34.4%	
Turnout		354,167		

=== 2014 election ===
In the Republican primary on March 4, 2014, Campbell won re-nomination to her first four-year term in the state Senate. She received 40,767 votes (55.4 percent). Her two opponents, Elisa Chan and Mike Novak, received 17,887 votes (24.3 percent) and 14,942 (20.3 percent), respectively.

Texas Senate
Preceded by Jeff Wentworth	Member of the Texas Senate from the 25th district 2013–present	Incumbent
Preceded by Brian Birdwell	President pro tempore of the Texas Senate; 2021–2023	Succeeded by Kelly Hancock
