= John Kuempel =

Texas legislator

Member of the Texas House of Representatives from the 44th district
- In office December 30, 2010 – January 14, 2025
- Preceded by: Edmund Kuempel
- Succeeded by: Alan Schoolcraft

Personal details
- Born: John Langston Kuempel; May 11, 1970 (age 56) Seguin, Texas, U.S.
- Party: Republican
- Spouse: Michelle
- Children: 2
- Education: University of Texas at Austin (BA)
- Occupation: Salesman
- Website: https://johnkuempel.com/

John Langston Kuempel (born May 11, 1970) is an American politician. He represented the 44th district in the Texas House of Representatives from 2010 to 2025. He was defeated by Alan Schoolcraft 55% to 45% on May 28, 2024, in the Republican primary runoff.

Edmund Kuempel had held the 44th District seat since 1983. He had been re-elected in 2010, but died before he could be sworn in for the 82nd Legislature.

As related members of the Texas Legislature, the Kuempels are one of around 100 such families where a parent-child pair, sibling pair, or spouse pair have both served in the Texas House and/or Senate.

Kuempel is a member of the Republican Party.

The Republican party of Guadalupe County, Texas, (Kuempel's home county in Texas) voted to censure Kuempel for his not following the party leadership's directives, namely from Governor Greg Abbott. Specifically, his vote in favor of the Paxton impeachment, his support of appointing Democrat Chairmanships to critical committees, and for his vote to kill funding for school choice.

Texas House of Representatives
Preceded by Edmund Kuempel	Member of the Texas House of Representatives from the 44th district 2010–present	Succeeded by Alan Schoolcraft
