= Allen W. Wilder =

American politician and lawyer

Allen W. Wilder (born about 1843) was an American state legislator, teacher, and lawyer in Texas. He was born into slavery in North Carolina. He was possibly the first African American in Texas to become a lawyer.

He served one term representing Washington County, Texas in the Texas House of Representatives after winning office in the 1872 election. His election to the House in 1876 was overturned.

Somebody shot him with a gun at a ballot counting site, and his arm was amputated.

== See also ==
- African American officeholders from the end of the Civil War until before 1900
