= Alan Schoolcraft =

American politician

Member of the Texas House of Representatives from the 44th district
- Incumbent
- Assumed office January 14, 2025
- Succeeded by: John Kuempel

Personal details
- Party: Republican
- Website: https://schoolcraftfortx.com/

Alan Schoolcraft is an American politician who was elected member of the Texas House of Representatives for the 44th district in 2024. A member of the Republican Party, he succeeded John Kuempel. He is a businessman and attorney. He was a member of the Texas State House from 1981 to 1993.

Schoolcraft has said that in 2027, the Texas Legislature would "try to ... define what a religion is", while claiming that "Islam itself is not just a religion. It's much more than a religion."
