= 70th Texas Legislature =

The 70th Texas Legislature met from January 13, 1987, to June 1, 1987. All members present during this session were elected in the 1986 general elections.

== Sessions ==
Regular Session: January 13, 1987 - June 1, 1987
1st Called Session: June 2, 1987 - June 3, 1987
2nd Called Session: June 22, 1987 - July 21, 1987

== Party summary ==
=== Senate ===
Affiliation	Members	Note
Democratic Party	25	
Republican Party	6	
Total	31	

=== House of Representatives ===
Affiliation	Members	Note
Democratic Party	90	
Republican Party	60	
Total	150	

== Officers ==
=== Senate ===
- Lieutenant Governor: William P. Hobby, Jr. (D)
- President Pro Tempore (regular session): Carl A. Parker (D)
- President Pro Tempore (called sessions): Roy M. Blake (D)

=== House ===
- Speaker of the House: Gibson D. "Gib" Lewis (D)

== Members ==
=== Senate ===
Dist. 1

- Richard M. Anderson (D), Marshall

Dist. 2

- Ted Lyon (D), Mesquite

Dist. 3

- Roy Blake, Sr. (D), Nacogdoches

Dist. 4

- Carl A. Parker (D), Port Arthur

Dist. 5

- Kent A. Caperton (D), Bryan

Dist. 6

- Gene Green (D), Houston

Dist. 7

- Don Henderson (R), Houston

Dist. 8

- O.H. "Ike" Harris (R), Dallas

Dist. 9

- Chet Edwards (D), Duncanville

Dist. 10

- Bob McFarland (R), Arlington

Dist. 11

- Chet Brooks (D), Houston

Dist. 12

- Hugh Q. Parmer (D), Fort Worth

Dist. 13

- Craig Anthony Washington (D), Houston

Dist. 14

- Gonzalo Barrientos (D), Austin

Dist. 15

- John Whitmire (D), Houston

Dist. 16

- John N. Leedom (R), Dallas

Dist. 17

- J. E. "Buster" Brown (R), Lake Jackson

Dist. 18

- Ken Armbrister (D), Victoria

Dist. 19

- Frank Tejeda (D), San Antonio

Dist. 20

- Carlos F. Truan (D), Corpus Christi

Dist. 21

- Judith Zaffirini (D), Laredo

Dist. 22

- Bob Glasgow (D), Stephenville

Dist. 23

- Eddie Bernice Johnson (D), Dallas

Dist. 24

- Grant Jones (D), Abilene

Dist. 25

- Bill Sims (D), San Angelo

Dist. 26

- Cyndi Taylor Krier (R), San Antonio

Dist. 27

- Hector Uribe (D), Brownsville

Dist. 28

- John T. Montford (D), Lubbock

Dist. 29

- Tati Santiesteban (D), El Paso

Dist. 30

- Ray Farabee (D), Wichita Falls

Dist. 31

- Bill Sarpalius (D), Amarillo

=== Key legislation ===
This session was, to date, the most prolific in history; exceeding previous records set in 1983 and 1985. The legislature filed 4,179 bills of which 1,185 were passed by the governor.

Senate bills responding to news-making events on various state university campuses were passed. These included a bill in response to a fraternity hazing death at the University of Texas and various bills directly addressing booster involvement in campus athletics. The latter bills were implemented to prevent events that had resulted in the so-called "death penalty" being assessed against Southern Methodist University by the NCAA. This issue was a particularly sore spot for governor Bill Clements since he had been the head of the university's board of trustees during the scandal and had purportedly authorized payments to student athletes in direct violation of NCAA policy.

Key legislation regarding the sale of alcoholic beverages was passed in this session. These included regulating the sale of alcohol and passage of an open container bill to prevent drinking of alcoholic beverages while driving an automobile. Other legislations related to intoxicants address "designer drugs" and placed legal liabilities on those establishments serving alcoholic beverages.

The Senate approved observing the third Monday in January as Martin Luther King, Jr. Day. Senate Bill 485, 70th Legislature Regular Session. Chapter 159. Approved May 25, 1987, and Effective August 31, 1987, as an optional holiday.

Two special sessions were held. The first, called by Clements, commenced June 2, 1987, and ended the following day. It was specifically designed to address issue related to insurance and civil liability, otherwise known as tort reform. The second special session addressed 72 various topics from passing the state budget to wastewater treatment, between June 22 and July 21, 1987.

== Sources ==
- Texas holidays
- Applebome, Peter (May 9, 1987). "Senior Trustees Quit as S.M.U. Revamps Board". The New York Times.
