= James H. Washington =

Texas politician

James H. Washington (May 1, 1850 – December 23, 1916) was a school principal and state legislator in Texas.

Washington was born in Fredericksburg, Virginia. He graduated from school at Oberlin College in Oberlin, Ohio (Oberlin Academy), and moved to Washington, D.C., with his family. He moved to Texas in the early 1870s, settling in Navasota where was the principal at a city school for African Americans.

He represented Grimes County in the Texas House of Representatives during the Thirteenth Texas Legislature. He served from 1873 to 1874, taking office after his contested election was resolved

He was a Republican who attended state party conventions in 1872, 1873, 1884, 1888, and 1890. He was part of the Colored Men's Convention of 1873.

Washington served in the Thirteenth Legislature in Texas as a representative of Grimes County, Texas. He married Mary F. Campbell in 1873 and they had one daughter. She was the daughter of Baptist missionary Israel S. Campbell. Washington moved to Galveston in 1874 and served on the city council, as an alderman from the Eighth Ward, and was an inspector of customs. Washington died on December 23, 1916. He is buried in Galveston City Cemetery.

== See also ==
- African American officeholders from the end of the Civil War until before 1900
