= Edmund Kuempel =

American politician (1942–2010)

Member of the Texas House of Representatives from the 44th district
- In office January 11, 1983 – November 4, 2010
- Succeeded by: John Kuempel

Personal details
- Born: November 29, 1942 Austin, Texas, U.S.
- Died: November 4, 2010 (aged 67)
- Resting place: Texas State Cemetery
- Party: Republican
- Education: Texas Lutheran University

Edmund Kuempel (November 29, 1942 – November 4, 2010) was an American politician who represented the 44th district in the Texas House of Representatives from 1983 until his death in 2010. He was succeeded in a special election by his son John Kuempel.
