= Cyndi Taylor Krier =

American lawyer and politician (born 1950)

Member of the Texas Senate from the 26th district
- In office January 8, 1985 – January 12, 1993
- Preceded by: Bob Vale
- Succeeded by: Jeff Wentworth

Bexar County Judge
- In office December 8, 1992 – March 1, 2001
- Succeeded by: Nelson Wolff

Personal details
- Born: July 12, 1950 (age 76) Beeville, Texas, U.S.
- Party: Republican
- Education: San Antonio College; Trinity University; University of Texas at Austin (BA); University of Texas School of Law (JD)

Cyndi Taylor Krier (born July 12, 1950) is an American lawyer and politician.

== Early life and career ==
Krier was born in Beeville, Texas, and spent much of her childhood in Dinero, Texas. She attended San Antonio College and Trinity University before ultimately enrolling at the University of Texas at Austin, graduating with a degree in journalism in 1971. Krier was involved with the Republican Party. She received her J.D. degree from University of Texas School of Law in 1975 and was admitted to the Texas bar.

Krier worked on the staff of U.S. Senator John Tower and Counselor to the President Anne Armstrong. She became a private attorney in San Antonio, Texas.

== Political career ==
Krier successfully ran for a San Antonio area seat in the Texas Senate in 1984. In the 69th Texas Legislature from 1985 to 1987, she was the only female senator. Krier was elected to a second term in 1988.

She was elected to two terms as County Judge of Bexar County, serving from 1993 to 2001.

== Later life ==
From 2001 to 2007, Krier served on the University of Texas System Board of Regents.

She joined the San Antonio-based financial services and insurance company USAA in 2002 as a vice president of governmental relations.
