= 69th Texas Legislature =

The 69th Texas Legislature met in regular session from January 8, 1985, to May 27, 1985, and in three subsequent special called sessions (see below). All members present during this session were elected in the 1984 general elections.

== Sessions ==
Regular Session: January 8, 1985 - May 27, 1985
1st Called Session: May 28, 1985 - May 30, 1985
2nd Called Session: August 6, 1986 - September 4, 1986
3rd Called Session: September 8, 1986 - September 30, 1986

== Party summary ==
=== Senate ===
Affiliation	Members	Note
Democratic Party	25	
Republican Party	6	
Total	31	

=== House ===
Affiliation	Members	Note
Democratic Party	95	
Republican Party	55	
Total	150	

== Officers ==
=== Senate ===
- Lieutenant Governor: William P. Hobby, Jr., Democrat
- President Pro Tempore (regular session): Ray Farabee, Democrat
- President Pro Tempore (1st called session): Carlos Truan, Democrat
- President Pro Tempore (2nd called session): Carlos Truan, Democrat
- President Pro Tempore (3rd called session): Carlos Truan, Democrat

=== House ===
- Speaker of the House: Gibson D. "Gib" Lewis, Democrat

== Members ==
=== Senate ===
Dist. 1

- Richard Anderson (D), Marshall

Dist. 2

- Ted Lyon (D), Rockwall

Dist. 3

- Roy Blake, Sr. (D), Jasper

Dist. 4

- Carl A. Parker (D), Port Arthur

Dist. 5

- Kent A. Caperton (D), Bryan

Dist. 6

- Lindon Williams (D), Houston

Dist. 7

- Don Henderson (R), Houston

Dist. 8

- O.H. "Ike" Harris (R), Dallas

Dist. 9

- Chet Edwards (D), Duncanville

Dist. 10

- Bob McFarland (R), Arlington

Dist. 11

- Chet Brooks (D), Houston

Dist. 12

- Hugh Q. Parmer (D), Fort Worth

Dist. 13

- Craig Washington (D), Houston

Dist. 14

- Gonzalo Barrientos (D), Austin

Dist. 15

- John Whitmire (D), Houston

Dist. 16

- John N. Leedom (R), Dallas

Dist. 17

- J. E. "Buster" Brown (R), Galveston

Dist. 18

- John Sharp (D), Victoria

Dist. 19

- Glenn Kothmann (D), San Antonio

Dist. 20

- Carlos Truan (D), Corpus Christi

Dist. 21

- John Traeger (D), Seguin

Dist. 22

- Bob Glasgow (D), Stephenville

Dist. 23

- Oscar Mauzy (D), Dallas

Dist. 24

- Grant Jones (D), Abilene

Dist. 25

- Bill Sims (D), San Angelo

Dist. 26

- Cyndi Taylor Krier (R), San Antonio

Dist. 27

- Hector Uribe (D), Brownsville

Dist. 28

- John T. Montford (D), Lubbock

Dist. 29

- Tati Santiesteban (D), El Paso

Dist. 30

- Ray Farabee (D), Wichita Falls

Dist. 31

- Bill Sarpalius (D), Amarillo

=== House ===
- Tommy Adkisson
- Fred J. Agnich
- Ken Armbrister
- Gordon 'Doc' Arnold
- Erwin W. Barton
- Hugo Berlanga
- Bill Blackwood
- Bill Blanton
- J.W. Buchanan
- Dick Burnett
- Bob Bush
- David Cain
- Ben Campbell
- Steve Carriker
- Bill Carter
- Eddie Cavazos
- Bill Ceverha
- Jerry Clark
- Billy Clemons
- Paul Colbert
- Frank Collazo, Jr.
- Barry Connelly
- Anne Cooper
- Tom Craddick
- Lloyd Criss
- Debra Danburg
- Wilhelmina Delco
- Betty Denton
- Harold V. Dutton, Jr.
- Robert Earley
- Robert Eckels
- Eldon Edge
- Al Edwards
- Ed Emmett
- Charles Evans
- Larry Q. Evans
- Charles Finnell
- Milton E. Fox
- A.C. 'Tony' Garcia
- Orlando Garcia
- John J. Gavin
- Gerald Geistweidt
- Bruce Gibson
- Smith Gilley
- Ron D. Givens
- Ernestine Glossbrenner
- J. Kelly Godwin
- Al Granoff
- Gene Green
- Lena Guerrero
- Clint Hackney
- Bill Haley
- W.N. 'Billy' Hall, Jr.
- Bill Hammond
- Chris Harris
- Jack Harris
- Dudley Harrison
- Talmadge Heflin
- Allen Hightower
- Paul Hilbert
- Anita Hill
- Patricia Hill
- Juan "Chuy" Hinojosa
- Bill Hollowell
- Jim Horn
- David Hudson
- Samuel Hudson III
- James Hury
- Lee Jackson
- Cliff Johnson
- Sam Johnson
- Arves E. Jones
- Ray Keller
- L.B. Kubiak
- Edmund Kuempel
- James E. "Pete" Laney
- Don Lee
- Bob Leonard, Jr.
- Gib Lewis
- Ron Lewis
- Albert Luna III
- Gregory Luna
- Frank Madla
- Roman Martinez
- Nancy McDonald
- Jan McKenna
- Mike McKinney
- Jim McWilliams
- Bob Melton
- Bill Messer
- Mike Millsap
- Dan Morales
- Alex Moreno
- Paul Moreno
- René O. Oliveira
- Jesse Oliver
- Jim Parker
- Kae T. Patrick
- David Patronella
- Pete Patterson
- Randy Pennington
- Nicolas Perez
- Rick Perry
- George Pierce
- Anthony Polumbo
- Albert Price
- Paul Ragsdale
- Irma Rangel
- Bob Richardson
- Randall H. Riley
- Ted Roberts
- Phyllis Robinson
- Nolan 'Buzz' Robnett
- Jim D. Rudd
- Sam Russell
- Robert Saunders
- Stan Schlueter
- Alan Schoolcraft
- Larry Don Shaw
- Gwyn Clarkston Shea
- Alex Short, Jr.
- Ashley Smith
- Carlyle Smith
- Richard A. Smith
- Terral R. Smith
- John Smithee
- Chip Staniswalis
- Mark Stiles
- Lou Nelle Sutton
- Jim Tallas
- M.A. Taylor
- Frank Tejeda
- Garfield Thompson
- Gary Thompson
- Senfronia Thompson
- Mike Toomey
- D.R. 'Tom' Uher
- Keith Valigura
- Jack Vowell
- Tom C. Waldrop
- Ralph Wallace
- Ed R. Watson
- Foster Whaley
- Ric Williamson
- Doyle Willis
- John Willy
- Ron Wilson
- Steven Wolens
- Brad Wright
- Jerry Yost
