= Nathan George Shelley =

American politician, lawyer and soldier (1825–1898)

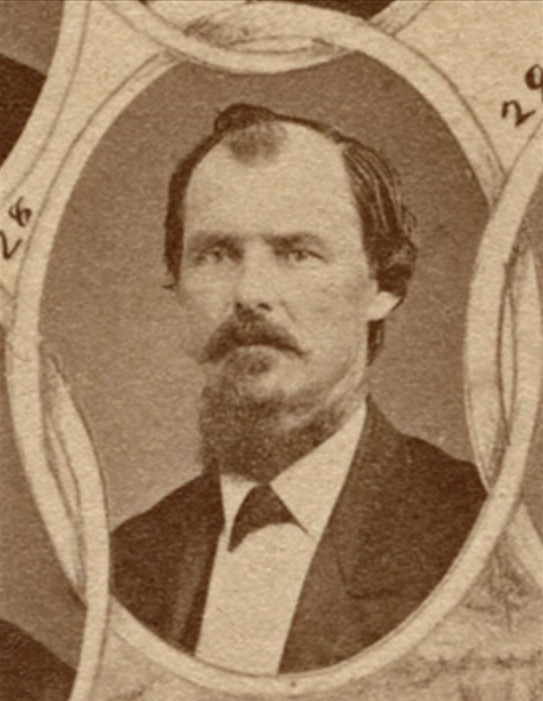
- Shelley's portrait for the 13th Texas Legislature

Texas Attorney General
- In office February 3, 1862 – 1864
- Preceded by: Malcolm D. Graham
- Succeeded by: Benjamin E. Tarver

Member of the Texas Senate
- In office November 4, 1861 – April 1, 1862
- Preceded by: Fletcher Stockdale
- Succeeded by: Archibald Woods Moore
- Constituency: 26th district
- In office August 6, 1866 – February 7, 1870
- Preceded by: Archibald Woods Moore
- Succeeded by: Enoch Leach Alford
- Constituency: 26th district
- In office January 14, 1873 – January 13, 1874
- Preceded by: Marmion Henry Bowers
- Succeeded by: William Harrison Westfall
- Constituency: 28th district

Member of the Alabama House of Representatives
- In office 1851–1855

Personal details
- Born: February 20, 1825 Hawkins County, Tennessee, US
- Died: January 5, 1898 (aged 72) Austin, Texas, US
- Party: Democratic
- Relations: Charles M. Shelley (brother); Jacob Davis Shelley (uncle)
- Occupation: Politician, lawyer, soldier

Military service
- Allegiance: United States (1846); Confederate States of America (1864–65)
- Branch/service: United States Army (1846); Confederate States Army (1864–65)
- Years of service: 1846; 1861–1865
- Rank: Brigadier general
- Unit: 1st Alabama Infantry Regiment (1846); Texas Militia (1861–65); Army of Tennessee (1864–65)
- Battles/wars: Mexican–American War; American Civil War; Atlanta campaign

Nathan George Shelley (February 20, 1825 – January 5, 1898) was an American politician, lawyer, and soldier. A Democrat, he was a member of the Texas House of Representatives and the Texas Attorney General.

Born in Tennessee, Shelley moved to Alabama as a boy and served in its state house of representatives. He was admitted to the bar, later moving to Texas and practicing law there. He was a member of the Texas House for three terms in the 1860s and 1870s. He fought in the Mexican–American War and in the American Civil War.

== Early life ==
Shelley was born on February 20, 1825, in Hawkins County, Tennessee, the son of William Parke Shelley and Margaret F. (née Etter) Shelley. His younger brother was Charles M. Shelley. He was of English, German, and Irish descent.

In 1837, Shelley and his father moved to Talladega County, Alabama. There, the two worked as brickmasons. He attended the common schools there until age 16. He studied at Emory & Henry University through 1841, though dropped out due to being unable to afford tuition, returning to brickmasonry with his father.

== Mexican–American War and early career ==
In 1846, Shelley enlisted into the 1st Alabama Infantry Regiment and fought in the Mexican–American War. He served under his uncle, Jacob Davis Shelley, who was at one point a member of the Alabama Senate.

After the war, Shelley returned to Alabama and worked as a clerk for a grocer and later a court. In his spare time, he read law, under William Parish Chilton and Samuel Farrow Rice. He was admitted to the bar in March 1849, after which he began practicing in Talladega.

Shelley was editor of the Talladega Alabama Reporter for two years. In search of warmer weather in order to recover from illness, he moved to Texas in winter 1854, settling in Austin on September 1 of the following year. He was admitted to the bar on December 12.

From 1856 until the outbreak of the American Civil War, Shelley was in a partnership with W. H. D. Carrington. In 1856, he, alongside Franklin W. Bowdon and John Lingard Hunter, collected funds for paying pro-slavery agitators in Bleeding Kansas.

== Politics, Amercian Civil War, and later career ==
Shelley was a Democrat. From 1851 to 1855, he was a member of the Alabama House of Representatives. He was a member of the Texas Senate, from November 4, 1861, to April 1, 1862, again from August 6, 1866, to February 7, 1870, and finally from January 14, 1873, to January 13, 1874. For his first two terms, he represented the 26th district, and for his final term, the 28th district.

While serving in the Texas House, Shelley was chairman of the Committees on Constitutional Amendments; on Finance; on Privileges and Elections; and on Public Buildings. He was a member of the Committees on Comptroller's and Treasurer's Accounts; on Confederate Relations; on Counties and County Boundaries; on Education; on Federal Relations; on Freedmen; on Indian Affairs (and Frontier Protection); on Internal Improvements; on the Judiciary; on the Land Office; on the Lunatic Asylum; on Manufacturing and Commerce; on Militia and Military Affairs; on Retrenchment and Reform; on Rules; and on State Affairs. He was a member of the Joint Committee on Election of U.S. Senators.

On March 31, 1861, Shelley was appointed manager of the Austin State Hospital by Governor Edward Clark. He served as manager until being elected Texas Attorney General, which he served as from February 3, 1862 to 1864. As Attorney General, he was sent to Richmond, Virginia to balance the Confederate federal budget for Texas to be granted funds to occupy and defend its frontier.

Returning from Richmond, Shelley contacted his brother, Charles Shelley, and Joseph E. Johnston. He subsequently enlisted into the Army of Tennessee and fought in the Civil War. While serving, he participated in the Atlanta campaign. From 1861 to 1865, he was brigadier general of the 26th Brigade of the Texas Militia. He was granted amnesty on November 1, 1865, after delivering an oath of surrender. He then formed a law partnership with George F. Moore, and in or after 1874, partnered with John Hancock.

== Personal life and death ==
In 1853, Shelley married Sarah F. Shelley, daughter of Jacob Davis Shelley and his cousin. They had six children together. He was a member of the Independent Order of Odd Fellows, having had joined in 1847. In 1873, he spoke at the funeral of Thomas F. McKinney. He died on January 5, 1898, aged 72, in Austin, from illness. However, the Birmingham Post-Herald claimed he died on December 15, 1897. An archive of his papers is held by the Barker Texas History Center.
