= Gonzalo Barrientos =

American politician (born 1941)

Member of the Texas Senate from the 14th district
- In office January 8, 1985 – January 9, 2007
- Preceded by: Lloyd Doggett
- Succeeded by: Kirk Watson

Member of the Texas House of Representatives from the 51st district
- In office 1983–1985
- Preceded by: Don Lee
- Succeeded by: Lena Guerrero

Personal details
- Born: July 20, 1941 (age 85)
- Party: Democratic

Gonzalo Barrientos Jr. (born 20 July 1941) is a former Democratic member of the Texas Senate representing the 14th District from 1985 to 2007. He was also a member of the Texas House of Representatives from Austin from 1975 to 1985.

In November 2001, Barrientos was arrested and charged with DWI, a class B misdemeanor in Texas. He later pleaded no contest, paid a fine, did community service and had his license suspended.

In 2024, Barrientos sued the city of Austin to prevent property taxes from being used to fund roads, sidewalks and affordable housing along Lady Bird Lake shores.

== Election history ==
Election history of Barrientos from 1992.

=== Most recent election ===
==== 2002 ====
Texas general election, 2002: Senate District 14
Party	Candidate	Votes	%	±%
Republican	Ben Bentzin	77,885	43.12	+43.12
Democratic	Gonzalo Barrientos (Incumbent)	95,182	52.70	−29.25
Libertarian	Marianne Robbins	7,537	4.17	−13.87
Majority		17,297	9.58	−54.33
Turnout		180,604		−20.20
Democratic hold				

=== Previous elections ===
==== 2000 ====
Texas general election, 2000: Senate District 14
Party	Candidate	Votes	%	±%
Democratic	Gonzalo Barrientos (Incumbent)	185,48	81.95	−2.92
Libertarian	Tom Davis	40,847	18.05	+2.92
Majority		144,631	63.90	−5.85
Turnout		180,604		−20.20
Democratic hold				

==== 1996 ====
Texas general election, 1996: Senate District 14
Party	Candidate	Votes	%	±%
Democratic	Gonzalo Barrientos (Incumbent)	157,194	84.87	+1.86
Natural Law	Sandra L. BonSell	28,013	15.13	+15.13
Majority		129,181	69.75	+3.72
Turnout		185,207		+13.07
Democratic hold				

==== 1994 ====
Texas general election, 1994: Senate District 14
Party	Candidate	Votes	%	±%
Democratic	Gonzalo Barrientos (Incumbent)	135,979	83.02	+15.40
Libertarian	Gary Johnson	27,820	16.98	+13.52
Majority		108,159	66.03	+27.34
Turnout		163,799		−35.75
Democratic hold				

==== 1992 ====
Texas general election, 1992: Senate District 14
Party	Candidate	Votes	%	±%
Democratic	Gonzalo Barrientos (Incumbent)	172,384	67.61	
Republican	Bill Malone Jr.	73,729	28.92	
Libertarian	Gary E. Johnson	8,837	3.47	
Majority		98,655	38.70	
Turnout		147,975		
Democratic hold				

Texas House of Representatives
Preceded by Wilson Foreman	Member of the Texas House of Representatives from District 37-4 (Austin); 1975–1977	Succeeded by Obsolete district
Preceded by New district	Member of the Texas House of Representatives from District 37-A (Austin); 1977–1983	Succeeded by Obsolete district
Preceded by Don Lee	Member of the Texas House of Representatives from District 51 (Austin); 1983–1985	Succeeded by Lena Guerrero
Texas Senate
Preceded by Lloyd Doggett	Texas State Senator from District 14 (Austin); 1985–2007	Succeeded by Kirk Watson
