= 76th Texas Legislature =

Term of state legislature in Texas, US

The 76th Texas Legislature met from January 12, 1999 to May 31, 1999. All members present during this session were elected in the 1998 general elections.

== Sessions ==
Regular Session: January 12, 1999 - May 31, 1999

== Party summary ==
=== Senate ===
Affiliation	Members	Note
Republican Party	16	
Democratic Party	15	
Total	31	

=== House ===
Affiliation	Members	Note
Democratic Party	78	
Republican Party	72	
Total	150	

== Officers ==
=== Senate ===
- Lieutenant Governor: Rick Perry, Republican
- President Pro Tempore: Teel Bivins, Republican

=== House ===
- Speaker of the House: Pete Laney, Democrat

== Members ==
=== Senate ===
- Ken Armbrister
- Gonzalo Barrientos
- David Bernsen
- Teel Bivins
- J.E. 'Buster' Brown
- David Cain
- John Carona
- Robert Duncan
- Rodney Ellis
- Troy Fraser
- Mario Gallegos
- Chris Harris
- Tom Haywood
- Mike Jackson
- Jon Lindsay
- Eddie Lucio, Jr.
- Gregory Luna
- Frank Madla
- Mike Moncrief
- Jane Nelson
- Drew Nixon
- Steve Ogden
- Bill Ratliff
- Florence Shapiro
- Eliot Shapleigh
- David Sibley
- Carlos F. Truan
- Jeff Wentworth
- Royce West
- John Whitmire
- Judith Zaffirini

=== House ===
- Clyde Alexander
- Ray Allen
- Leo Alvarado, Jr.
- Kip Averitt
- Kevin Bailey
- Leo Berman
- Dennis Bonnen
- Fred Bosse
- Kim Brimer
- Betty Brown
- Fred Brown
- Lon Burnam
- Jaime Capelo
- Bill Carter
- Norma Chavez
- Warren Chisum
- Wayne Christian
- Ron Clark
- Garnet Coleman
- Robert "Robby" Cook
- Frank Corte, Jr.
- David Counts
- Joe Crabb
- Tom Craddick
- Ronny Crownover
- Henry Cuellar
- John Culberson
- Debra Danburg
- John E. Davis
- Yvonne Davis
- Dianne White Delisi
- Mary Denny
- Joe Deshotel
- Joe Driver
- Dawnna Dukes
- Jim Dunnam
- Harold V. Dutton, Jr.
- Al Edwards
- Harryette Ehrhardt
- Craig Eiland
- Gary Elkins
- Dan Ellis
- David Farabee
- Jessica Farrar
- Ismael "Kino" Flores
- Pete Gallego
- Domingo Garcia
- Kenn George
- Helen Giddings
- Bob Glaze
- Toby Goodman
- Tony Goolsby
- Patricia Gray
- Rick Green
- Sherri Greenberg
- Kent Grusendorf
- Roberto Gutierrez
- Patrick "Pat" Haggerty
- Peggy Hamric
- Richard "Rick" Hardcastle
- Will Hartnett
- Judy Hawley
- Talmadge Heflin
- Paul Hilbert
- Harvey Hilderbran
- Fred Hill
- Juan "Chuy" Hinojosa
- Scott Hochberg
- Terri Hodge
- Mark Homer
- Ruben Hope, Jr.
- Charlie Howard
- Bob Hunter
- Suzanna Gratia Hupp
- Carl Isett
- Kyle L. Janek
- Charles B. Jones
- Delwin Jones
- Jesse Jones
- Robert Junell
- Terry Keel
- Jim Keffer
- Phil King
- Tracy O. King
- Mike Krusee
- Edmund Kuempel
- James E. "Pete" Laney
- David Lengefeld
- Glenn Lewis
- Ron Lewis
- John Longoria
- Vilma Luna
- Jerry Madden
- Kenny Marchant
- Glen Maxey
- Brian McCall
- Ruth Jones McClendon
- Jim McReynolds
- Tommy Merritt
- Joe Moreno
- Paul Moreno
- Geanie Morrison
- Anna Mowery
- Elliott Naishtat
- Manny Najera
- Joe Nixon
- Rick Noriega
- René O. Oliveira
- Dora Olivo
- Sue Palmer
- Joe C. Pickett
- Jim Pitts
- Robert Puente
- Tom Ramsay
- Irma Rangel
- Arthur "Art" Reyna
- Elvira Reyna
- Allan Ritter
- Paul Sadler
- Ignacio Salinas, Jr.
- Gene Seaman
- John Shields
- Bill Siebert
- Todd Smith
- John Smithee
- Jim Solis
- Juan Solis, III
- Burt Solomons
- Todd Staples
- David Swinford
- Robert Talton
- Barry Telford
- Senfronia Thompson
- Dale Tillery
- Vicki Truitt
- Bob Turner
- Sylvester Turner
- D.R. 'Tom' Uher
- Carlos Uresti
- Leticia Van de Putte
- Gary Walker
- G.E. 'Buddy' West
- Tommy Williams
- Ron Wilson
- Miguel "Mike" Wise
- Arlene Wohlgemuth
- Steven Wolens
- Beverly Woolley
- Ken Yarbrough
- Zeb Zbranek
