= 1994 United States Senate election in Texas =

- November 8, 1994
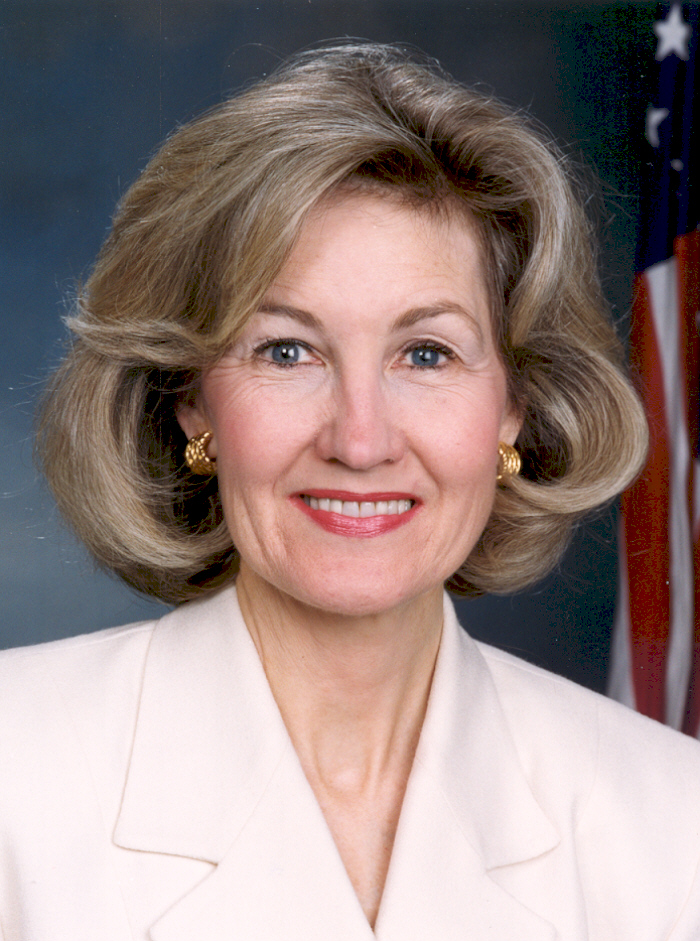

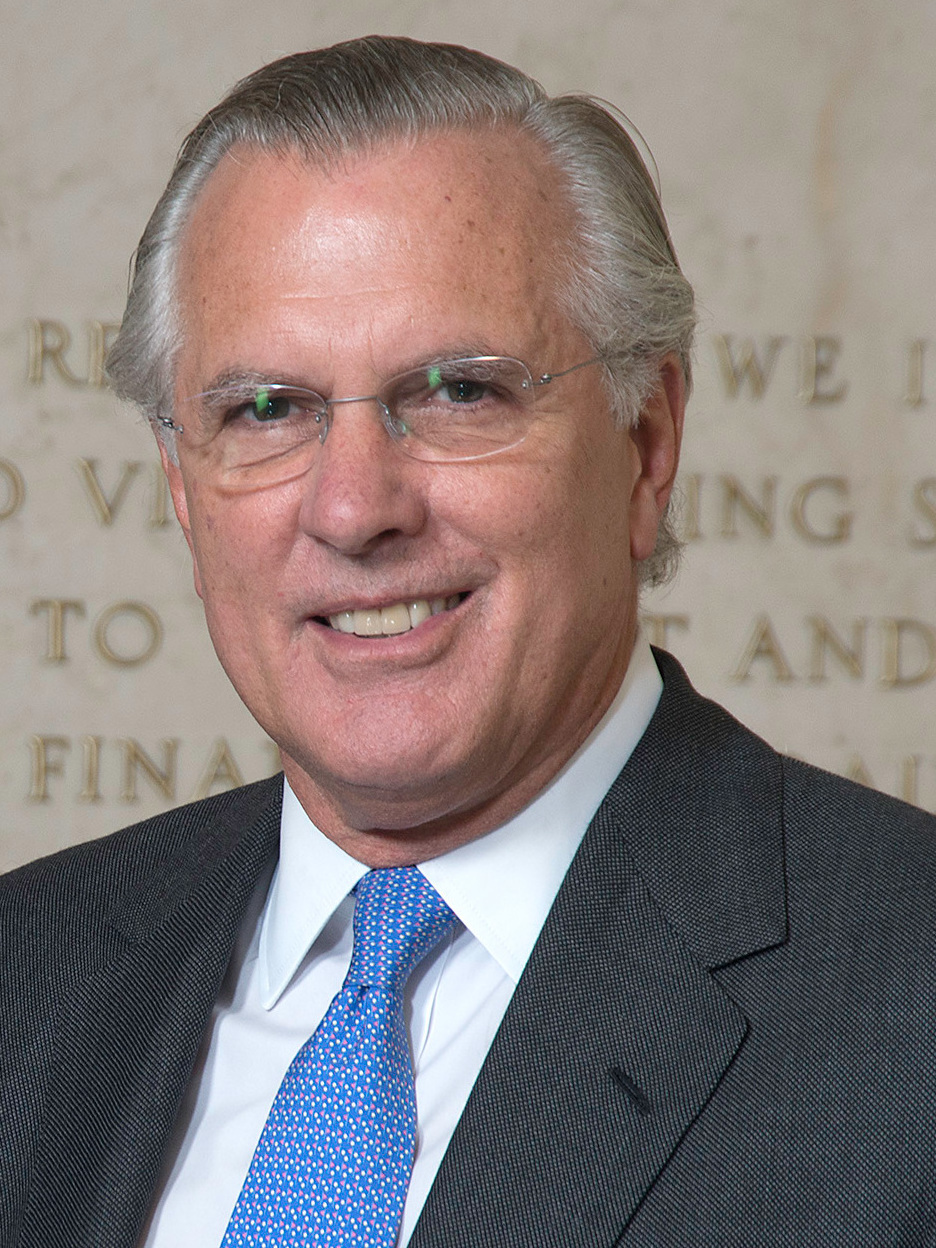
Nominee	Kay Bailey Hutchison	Richard W. Fisher
Party	Republican	Democratic
Popular vote	2,604,218	1,639,615
Percentage	60.85%	37.31%
- County results Hutchison: 40–50% 50–60% 60–70% 70–80% 80–90% Fisher: 40–50% 50–60% 60–70% 70–80% 80–90% Tie: 50%
U.S. senator before election
Kay Bailey Hutchison
Republican
Elected U.S. Senator
Kay Bailey Hutchison
Republican

The 1994 United States Senate election in Texas was held November 8, 1994. Incumbent Republican U.S. Senator Kay Bailey Hutchison won re-election to her first full term. This marked the first time that a Republican won a full term to this seat in history.

== Republican primary ==
Immediately following her victory in the June 1993 special election for U.S. Senate, incumbent senator Kay Bailey Hutchinson sought nomination by the Republican Party for a full term. Though Hutchinson faced six opponents in the primary, she received 84% of the vote, thus securing the nomination without a runoff.

=== Candidates ===
==== Nominee ====
- Kay Bailey Hutchison, incumbent U.S. Senator

==== Eliminated in primary ====
- Stephen Hopkins
- James C. Currey
- Roger Henson
- Ernest J. Schmidt
- M. Troy Mata
- Tom Spink

Republican primary results
Party	Candidate	Votes	%
Republican	Kay Bailey Hutchison (incumbent)	467,975	84.27%
Republican	Stephen Hopkins	34,703	6.25%
Republican	James C. Currey	15,625	2.81%
Republican	Roger Henson	14,021	2.52%
Republican	Ernest J. Schmidt	8,690	1.56%
Republican	M. Troy Mata	8,632	1.55%
Republican	Tom Spink	5,692	1.02%
Total votes		555,338	100.00%

== Democratic primary ==
First round results by county: Mattox: 30–40%; 40–50%; 50–60%; 60–70%; Fisher: 30–40%; 40–50%; 50–60%; 60–70%; Andrews: 30–40%; 40–50%; Tie

Runoff results by county: Fisher: 50–60%; 60–70%; 70–80%; Mattox: 50–60%; 60–70%; Tie

=== Candidates ===
==== Nominee ====
- Richard W. Fisher, businessman, former Special Assistant to Secretary of the Treasury, and candidate for Senate in 1993

==== Eliminated in runoff ====
- Jim Mattox, former Texas Attorney General and U.S. Representative from Dallas

==== Eliminated in primary ====
- Michael A. Andrews, U.S. Representative from Houston
- Evelyn Lantz, activist and perennial candidate

Democratic primary results
Party	Candidate	Votes	%
Democratic	Jim Mattox	416,342	40.51%
Democratic	Richard Fisher	387,989	37.75%
Democratic	Michael Andrews	159,828	15.55%
Democratic	Evelyn Lantz	63,517	6.18%
Total votes		1,027,676	100.00%

=== Runoff ===
Democratic runoff results
Party	Candidate	Votes	%
Democratic	Richard Fisher	400,227	53.60%
Democratic	Jim Mattox	346,414	46.40%
Total votes		746,641	100.00%

== General election ==
General election results
Party	Candidate	Votes	%
Republican	Kay Bailey Hutchison (incumbent)	2,604,218	60.85%
Democratic	Richard W. Fisher	1,639,615	38.31%
Libertarian	Pierre Blondeau	36,107	0.84%
Total votes		4,279,940	100.00%
Majority		964,603	22.54%
Republican hold			

== See also ==
- 1994 United States Senate elections
