= 1992 Texas general election =

The 1992 Texas general election was held on November 3, 1992, in the U.S. state of Texas. Voters statewide elected the U.S. President and the Railroad Commissioner. Statewide judicial offices up for election were three justices of the Texas Supreme Court and three judges of the Texas Court of Criminal Appeals.

The 1992 United States House of Representatives elections in Texas were conducted as part of the general election.

== United States President ==
United States presidential election in Texas, 1992
Party	Candidate	Votes	Percentage	Electoral votes
Republican Party	George Bush	2,496,071	40.56%	32
Democratic	Bill Clinton	2,281,815	37.07%	0
Libertarian	Andre Marrou	19,699	0.32%	0
Independent	Ross Perot	1,354,781	22.01%	0
Write In	Howard Phillips	359	0.0%	0
Write In	Quinn Brisben	78	0.0%	0
Write In	James Bo Gritz	505	0.0%	0
Write In	Lyndon H. LaRouche, Jr.	169	0.0%	0
Write In	James Wellington Wright	23	0.0%	0
Write In	Lenora B. Fulani	301	0.0%	0
Write In	John S. Hagelin	217	0.0%	0
Totals		-	100.00%	32
Voter turnout (Voting age population)				72.92%

== Railroad Commissioner ==
1992 election for Railroad Commissioner
Party	Candidate	Votes	%	±%
Republican	Barry Williamson	3,151,953	53.65	
Democratic	Lena Guerrero (inc.)	2,306,619	39.26	
Libertarian	Richard N. Draheim, Jr.	410,614	6.98	
Write-In	Richard S. Landon	5,686	0.09	
Majority		845,334	14.39	
Turnout		5,874,872		
Republican gain from Democratic		Swing		

== Legislative elections ==
=== Texas Senate ===
==== Districts 1-5 ====
1992 election for State Senator, District 1
Party	Candidate	Votes	%	±%
Republican	Bill Ratliff (Incumbent)	102,310	52.13	
Democratic	A.M. Bob Aikin	93,937	47.86	
Turnout		196,247	100.00	

1992 election for State Senator, District 2
Party	Candidate	Votes	%	±%
Republican	Florence Shapiro	129,228	53.54	
Democratic	Ted Lyon (Incumbent)	96,746	40.08	
Libertarian	Richard C. Donaldson	15,384	6.37	
Turnout		241,358	100.00	

1992 election for State Senator, District 3
Party	Candidate	Votes	%	±%
Democratic	Bill Haley (Incumbent)	117,709	53.86	
Republican	Gene Shull	100,826	46.13	
Turnout		218,535	100.00	

1992 election for State Senator, District 4
Party	Candidate	Votes	%	±%
Democratic	Carl A. Parker (Incumbent)	114,999	54.57	
Republican	Michael L. Galloway	95,741	45.43	
Turnout		210,740	100.00	

1992 election for State Senator, District 5
Party	Candidate	Votes	%	±%
Democratic	Jim Turner (Incumbent)	134,875	100.00	
Turnout		134,875	100.00	

==== Districts 21-25 ====
1992 election for State House, District 22

=== Texas House of Representatives ===
1992 election for State House, District 1
Party	Candidate	Votes	%	±%
Democratic	Barry B. Telford (Incumbent)	30,216	100.00	
Turnout		30,216	100.00	

1992 election for State House, District 2
Party	Candidate	Votes	%	±%
Democratic	Thomas Donald Ramsay	25,051	61.48	
Republican	Janie Wilson	15,697	38.52	
Turnout		40,748	100.00	

1992 election for State House, District 3
Party	Candidate	Votes	%	±%
Democratic	Pete Patterson (Incumbent)	30,733	100.00	
Turnout		30,733	100.00	

1992 election for State House, District 4
Party	Candidate	Votes	%	±%
Democratic	Keith Oakley (Incumbent)	23,117	55.30	
Republican	Bill Thomas	18,685	44.70	
Turnout		41,802	100.00	

== Texas Supreme Court ==
=== Justice, Place 1 ===
1992 election for Texas Supreme Court Justice, Place 1
Party	Candidate	Votes	%	±%
Republican	Craig Enoch	3,059,529	53.31	
Democratic	Oscar H. Mauzy (inc.)	2,473,309	43.10	
Libertarian	Alfred Adask	205,335	3.57	
Majority		586,220	10.21	
Turnout		5,738,173		
Republican gain from Democratic		Swing		

=== Justice, Place 2 ===
As of 2026, this election marked the last time where a Democrat flipped a statewide office in Texas from the Republicans.

1992 election for Texas Supreme Court Justice, Place 2
Party	Candidate	Votes	%	±%
Republican	Eugene Cook (inc.)	2,697,017	47.77	
Democratic	Rose Spector	2,948,377	52.22	
Majority		251,360	4.45	
Turnout		5,645,394		
Democratic gain from Republican		Swing		

=== Justice, Place 3 ===
1992 election for Texas Supreme Court Justice, Place 3
Party	Candidate	Votes	%	±%
Republican	John D. Montgomery	2,432,933	43.20	
Democratic	Jack Hightower (inc.)	3,198,712	56.79	
Majority		765,779	13.59	
Turnout		5,631,645		
Democratic hold		Swing		

== Texas Court of Criminal Appeals ==
=== Judge, Place 1 ===
1992 election for Texas Court of Criminal Appeals, Place 1
Party	Candidate	Votes	%	±%
Republican	Joseph A. Devany	2,552,601	47.19	
Democratic	Charles F. Baird (inc.)	2,855,901	52.80	
Majority		303,300	5.61	
Turnout		5,408,502		
Democratic hold		Swing		

=== Judge, Place 2 ===
1992 election for Texas Court of Criminal Appeals, Place 2
Party	Candidate	Votes	%	±%
Republican	Sue Lagarde	2,667,300	48.95	
Democratic	Morris L. Overstreet (inc.)	2,781,729	51.04	
Majority		114,429	2.09	
Turnout		5,449,029		
Democratic hold		Swing		

=== Judge, Place 3 ===
1992 election for Texas Court of Criminal Appeals, Place 3
Party	Candidate	Votes	%	±%
Republican	Lawrence Meyers	2,732,689	50.50	
Democratic	Fortunato Benavides (inc.)	2,677,996	49.49	
Majority		54,693	1.01	
Turnout		5,410,685		
Republican gain from Democratic		Swing		

== State Board of Education ==
Only contested elections are listed.

=== Member, State Board of Education, District 4 ===
1992 election for State Board of Education, District 4
Party	Candidate	Votes	%	±%
Democratic	Alma A. Allen	214,149	88.94	
Libertarian	Charles Fuller	26,609	11.05	
Majority		187,540	77.89	
Turnout		240,758		

=== Member, State Board of Education, District 5 ===
1992 election for State Board of Education, District 5
Party	Candidate	Votes	%	±%
Democratic	Ted Coulter	184,333	45.05	
Republican	Bob Offutt	224,790	54.94	
Majority		40,457	9.89	
Turnout		409,123		

=== Member, State Board of Education, District 8 ===
1992 election for State Board of Education, District 8
Party	Candidate	Votes	%	±%
Democratic	Mary Knotts Perkins (inc.)	234,095	58.23	
Republican	D. W. Diehl	167,902	41.76	
Majority		66,193	16.47	
Turnout		401,997		

=== Member, State Board of Education, District 9 ===
1992 election for State Board of Education, District 9
Party	Candidate	Votes	%	±%
Democratic	Patsy Johnson	226,317	58.39	
Republican	C. B. Jones	160,992	41.54	
Write-In	Gene W. Hightower	225	0.05	
Majority		65,325	16.85	
Turnout		387,534		

=== Member, State Board of Education, District 11 ===
1992 election for State Board of Education, District 11
Party	Candidate	Votes	%	±%
Republican	Diane Patrik	341,029	83.47	
Libertarian	Jeri Barthel	67,502	16.52	
Majority		273,527	66.95	
Turnout		408,531		

=== Member, State Board of Education, District 13 ===
1992 election for State Board of Education, District 13
Party	Candidate	Votes	%	±%
Democratic	Emmett Conrad (inc.)	197,568	85.73	
Libertarian	Gordon Mobley	32,877	14.26	
Majority		164,691	44.47	
Turnout		230,445		

== Court of Appeals ==
Only contested elections are listed.

=== First Court of Appeals ===
1992 election for Justice, 1st Court of Appeals (Unexpired)
Party	Candidate	Votes	%	±%
Republican	Adele Hedges	601,123	52.76	
Democratic	Gaynelle Jones (inc.)	538,192	47.23	
Majority		62,931	5.53	
Turnout		1,139,315		
Republican gain from Democratic		Swing		

=== Second Court of Appeals ===
1992 election for Justice, 2nd Court of Appeals, Place 3
Party	Candidate	Votes	%	±%
Republican	Tod Weaver	346,724	53.61	
Democratic	Doyel Willis, Jr.	299,925	46.38	
Majority		46,799	7.23	
Turnout		646,649		

=== Fourth Court of Appeals ===
1992 election for Justice, 4th Court of Appeals
Party	Candidate	Votes	%	±%
Republican	Tom Rickhoff	291,643	51.26	
Democratic	Ron Carr (inc.)	277,248	48.73	
Majority		14,395	2.53	
Turnout		568,891		
Republican gain from Democratic		Swing		

=== Fifth Court of Appeals ===
1992 election for Justice, 5th Court of Appeals, Place 1
Party	Candidate	Votes	%	±%
Republican	David Brooks	387,445	48.05	
Democratic	Ron Chapman (inc.)	418,852	51.94	
Majority		31,407	3.89	
Turnout		806,297		
Democratic hold		Swing		

1992 election for Justice, 5th Court of Appeals, Place 4 (Unexpired)
Party	Candidate	Votes	%	±%
Republican	Will Barber	402,088	52.15	
Democratic	Jeff Kaplan (inc.)	368,905	47.84	
Majority		33,183	4.31	
Turnout		770,993		
Republican gain from Democratic		Swing		

1992 election for Justice, 5th Court of Appeals, Place 5 (Unexpired)
Party	Candidate	Votes	%	±%
Republican	Jack Hampton	393,454	49.02	
Democratic	Barbara Rosenberg (inc.)	409,075	50.97	
Majority		15,621	1.95	
Turnout		802,529		
Democratic hold		Swing		

1992 election for Justice, 5th Court of Appeals, Place 6 (Unexpired)
Party	Candidate	Votes	%	±%
Republican	Joseph B. Morris	420,487	54.55	
Democratic	Kevin Wiggins (inc.)	350,225	45.44	
Majority		70,262	9.11	
Turnout		770,712		
Republican gain from Democratic		Swing		

=== Seventh Court of Appeals ===
1992 election for Justice, 7th Court of Appeals, Place 1
Party	Candidate	Votes	%	±%
Republican	Jairl Dowell	124,143	49.95	
Democratic	Carlton B. Dodson (inc.)	124,380	50.04	
Majority		237	0.09	
Turnout		248,523		
Democratic hold		Swing		

=== Eight Court of Appeals ===
1992 election for Justice, 8th Court of Appeals
Party	Candidate	Votes	%	±%
Republican	Marc Skeen	101,891	43.07	
Democratic	Susan Larsen (inc.)	134,647	56.92	
Majority		32,756	13.85	
Turnout		236,538		
Democratic hold		Swing		

=== Fourteenth Court of Appeals ===
1992 election for Justice, 14th Court of Appeals, Place 1
Party	Candidate	Votes	%	±%
Republican	Harvey Hudson	555,435	49.47	
Democratic	Norman Lee	567,233	50.52	
Majority		11,798	1.05	
Turnout		1,122,668		

1992 election for Justice, 14th Court of Appeals, Place 2
Party	Candidate	Votes	%	±%
Republican	Gary C. Bowers	566,228	50.55	
Democratic	Henry L. Burkholder	553,723	49.44	
Majority		12,505	1.11	
Turnout		1,119,951		
