= Texas's 67th House of Representatives district =

American legislative district

Texas's 67th State House of Representatives district
Representative
Jeff Leach; R–Plano
- Demographics: 51.7% White; 12.3% Black; 19.6% Hispanic; 14.2% Asian
- Population (2020) • Voting age: 200,888; 148,161

The Texas House of Representatives' 67th district represents a portion of Collin County.

The current representative of this district is Jeff Leach, a Republican from Plano who has represented the district since 2013.

The district contains portions of Plano, Allen, McKinney, Princeton, and Anna. In addition, the district all of Melissa, Farmersville, Blue Ridge, and New Hope.

== List of representatives ==
Legislature	Representative	Party	Term start	Term end
4th	Edward Hord	Unknown	1851	1853
5th	Edward Hord	Unknown	1853	1855
6th	Anthony Banning Norton	Unknown	1855	1857
7th	John Leal Haynes	Unknown	1857	1859
8th	John Leal Haynes	Unknown	1859	1861
9th	E.D. Lane	Unknown	1861	1862
10th	James Ranck	Unknown	1863	1866
11th	Frederick Tegener	Unknown	1866	1870
12th-14th	District inactive		1870	1876
15th	Alexander Jesse Northington	Democratic	1876	1879
16th	James Ashbury Rumsey	Democratic	1879	1881
17th	H.S. Arnold	Democratic	1881	1883
18th	M.H. Townsend	Democratic	1883	1885
19th	Thomas C. Cook	Republican	1885	1887
20th	John Monroe Woolsey	Democratic	1887	1889
21st	Ibzan William Middlebrook	Democratic	1889	1891
22nd	William L. Adkins	Democratic	1891	1893
23rd	Elbert M. Weeks	Democratic	1893	1895
24th	Robert W. Martin	Democratic	1895	1897
25th	Robert W. Martin	Democratic	1897	1899
26th	Isaac William Culp	Democratic	1899	1901
27th	Joshua Franklin Tharpe	Democratic	1901	1903
28th	George Washington Brown	Democratic	1903	1905
29th	John Ellison Davis	Democratic	1905	1907
30th	Churchill Jones Bartlett	Democratic	1907	1909
31st	Churchill Jones Bartlett	Democratic	1909	1911
32nd	Forrest Gaither	Democratic	1911	1913
33rd	Henry B. Savage	Democratic	1913	1915
34th	Henry B. Savage	Democratic	1915	1917
35th	Frank Lindemann	Democratic	1917	1919
36th	Isaac William Culp	Democratic	1919	1921
37th	Oscar Dudley Baker	Democratic	1921	1923
38th	James Charles Wilson	Democratic	1923	1925
39th	Baker Blount Hoskins	Democratic	1925	1926
39th	William Madden Fly	Democratic	1926	1927
40th	William Madden Fly	Democratic	1927	1929
41st	Welly Kennon Hopkins	Democratic	1929	1931
42nd	Conde Rague Hoskins	Democratic	1931	1933
43rd	Conde Rague Hoskins	Democratic	1933	1935
44th	Conde Rague Hoskins	Democratic	1935	1937
45th	Conde Rague Hoskins	Democratic	1937	1939
46th	John Marvin Mohrmann	Democratic	1939	1941
47th	Durwood Manford	Democratic	1941	1943
48th	Durwood Manford	Democratic	1941	1943
49th	Durwood Manford	Democratic	1943	1945
'50th	Durwood Manford	Democratic	1945	1947
51st	Durwood Manford	Democratic	1949	1951
52nd	Otis Henderson	Democratic	1951	1952
53rd	Herman August Heideke	Democratic	1953	1955
54th	Herman August Heideke	Democratic	1955	1957
55th	Raymond Arthur Bartram	Democratic	1957	1959
56th	Raymond Arthur Bartram	Democratic	1959	1961
57th	Raymond Arthur Bartram	Democratic	1961	1963
58th	Herbert Otto Niemeyer	Democratic	1963	1965
59th	David Howard	Democratic	1965	1967
60th	Ralph Scoggins	Democratic	1967	1969
61st	H. Tati Santiesteban	Democratic	1969	1971
62nd	H. Tati Santiesteban	Democratic	1971	1973
63rd	Ben Bynum	Democratic	1973	1975
64th	Ben Bynum	Democratic	1975	1977
65th	Danny Hill	Democratic	1977	1979
66th	Danny Hill	Democratic	1979	1981
67th	Chip Staniswalis	Republican	1981	1983
68th	Gerald Geistweidt	Republican	1983	1985
69th	Gerald Geistweidt	Republican	1985	1987
70th	Gerald Geistweidt	Republican	1987	1989
71st	Harvey Hilderbran	Republican	1989	1991
72nd	Harvey Hilderbran	Republican	1991	1993
73rd	Jerry Madden	Republican	1993	1995
74th	Jerry Madden	Republican	1995	1997
75th	Jerry Madden	Republican	1997	1999
76th	Jerry Madden	Republican	1999	2001
77th	Jerry Madden	Republican	2001	2003
78th	Jerry Madden	Republican	2003	2005
79th	Jerry Madden	Republican	2005	2007
80th	Jerry Madden	Republican	2007	2009
81st	Jerry Madden	Republican	2009	2011
82nd	Jerry Madden	Republican	2011	2013
83rd	Jeff Leach	Republican	2013	2015
84th	Jeff Leach	Republican	2015	2017
85th	Jeff Leach	Republican	2017	2019
86th	Jeff Leach	Republican	2019	2021
87th	Jeff Leach	Republican	2021	2023
88th	Jeff Leach		2023	2025
