= List of presidents pro tempore of the Texas Senate =

Seal of the Senate of Texas

President pro tempore (often shortened to pro tem) of the Texas Senate is a largely honorary position, and is third in the line for the governorship of Texas. If the governor and lieutenant governor are both out of the state, the president pro tem is acting governor in their absence.

At the beginning of each session, the Senate elects one member to serve as the president pro tempore when the lieutenant governor is absent or that office becomes vacant. A different member of the Senate (usually a senior member, but unlike in some bodies, it is not based on seniority) is elected at the end of the session to serve as president pro tempore during the interim when the state legislature is not in session. The Senate traditionally honors presidents pro tempore once during their term by having the governor and lieutenant governor leave the state on the same day and inaugurating the president pro tempore as governor for a day.

The president pro tempore does not preside over the chamber on a daily basis. Usually, Texas's lieutenant governor regularly presides over the chamber as president of the state senate.

== Presidents pro tempore of the Texas Senate ==
| Name | Party | Legislative sessions |
|---|---|---|
| Edward Burleson | Democratic | 1st, 2nd, 3rd |
| Jesse Grimes | Democratic | 4th |
| M. D. K. Taylor | Democratic | 5th |
| Jesse Grimes | Democratic | 6th |
| M. D. K. Taylor | Democratic | 7th |
| Samuel Maverick | Democratic | 7th |
| Jesse Grimes | Democratic | 8th |
| Robert Henry Guinn | Democratic | 9th, 10th, 11th |
| Donald Campbell | Republican | 12th |
| David Webster Flanagan | Republican | 12th |
| Edward Bradford Pickett | Democratic | 13th |
| John Ireland | Democratic | 14th |
| Wells Thompson | Democratic | 15th |
| Edwin Hobby | Democratic | 16th |
| Leonidas Jefferson Storey | Democratic | 16th |
| John Young Gooch | Democratic | 17th |
| Francis Marion Martin | Democratic | 17th |
| Augustus Weyman Houston | Democratic | 18th |
| Samuel Bronson Cooper | Democratic | 18th |
| William Russell Shannon | Democratic | 19th |
| Constantine Buckley "Buck" Kilgore | Democratic | 19th |
| William Henry Pope | Democratic | 20th |
| John Woods | Democratic | 20th |
| Henry Dearborn McDonald | Democratic | 21st |
| William Henry Burges | Democratic | 21st |
| John Walter Cranford | Democratic | 22nd |
| Ernst Gustav Maetze | Democratic | 22nd |
| Louis Napoleon Frank | Democratic | 22nd |
| Robert Hance Burney | Democratic | 22nd |
| John G. Kearby | Democratic | 23rd |
| Edwin Augustus Atlee | Democratic | 23rd |
| Perry Joshua Lewis | Democratic | 24th |
| James Dinwiddie Woods | Democratic | 24th |
| Joseph Burton Dibrell Jr. | Democratic | 25th |
| James R. Gough | Democratic | 25th |
| Robert N. Stafford | Democratic | 26th |
| William W. Turney | Democratic | 26th |
| Barry Miller | Democratic | 27th |
| George D. Neal | Democratic | 27th |
| Daniel W. Odell | Democratic | 27th |
| Asbury Bascom Davidson | Democratic | 27th |
| Calhoun L. Potter | Democratic | 27th |
| Asbury Bascom Davidson | Democratic | 28th |
| Robert V. Davidson | Democratic | 28th |
| George W. Savage | Democratic | 28th |
| William A. Hanger | Democratic | 29th |
| John G. Willacy | Democratic | 29th |
| James J. Faulk | Democratic | 29th |
| William C. McKamy Jr. | Democratic | 29th |
| Sidney P. Skinner | Democratic | 30th |
| McDonald J. Meachum | Democratic | 30th |
| A. P. Barrett | Democratic | 30th |
| Benjamin F. Looney | Democratic | 30th |
| James M. Terrell | Democratic | 31st |
| Quintus et Ultimus Watson | Democratic | 31st |
| Charles L. Brachfield | Democratic | 31st |
| Edward Irwin Kellie | Democratic | 31st |
| William Owen Murray | Democratic | 31st |
| Alfred John Harper | Democratic | 31st |
| David McNeil Alexander | Democratic | 31st |
| Henry Berryman Terrell | Democratic | 31st |
| Erasmus Gilbert Senter | Democratic | 31st |
| Ferdinand C. Weinert | Democratic | 31st |
| Claude B. Hudspeth | Democratic | 32nd |
| Thomas W. Perkins | Democratic | 32nd |
| Charles Vernon Terrell | Democratic | 32nd |
| Earle Bradford Mayfield | Democratic | 32nd |
| Offa Shivers Lattimore | Democratic | 33rd |
| William Jeffries Greer | Democratic | 33rd |
| Edgar Hubbard Carter | Democratic | 33rd |
| Vinson A. Collins | Democratic | 33rd |
| Robert Lee Warren | Democratic | 33rd |
| James Robert Wiley | Democratic | 33rd |
| Flavius M. Gibson | Democratic | 33rd |
| Wright Chalfant Morrow | Democratic | 33rd |
| Charles Walter Taylor | Democratic | 33rd |
| Quintus et Ultimus Watson | Democratic | 33rd |
| Clinton W. Nugent | Democratic | 34th |
| William J. Townsend Jr. | Democratic | 34th |
| James R. Wiley | Democratic | 34th |
| Isaac E. Clark | Democratic | 34th |
| John M. Henderson | Democratic | 35th |
| Flavius M. Gibson | Democratic | 35th |
| Ed Westbrook | Democratic | 35th |
| William D. Suiter | Democratic | 35th |
| Claude B. Hudspeth | Democratic | 35th |
| Alonzo Abner "Lon" Smith | Democratic | 35th |
| William Luther Dean | Democratic | 35th |
| James Clayton McNealus | Democratic | 35th |
| William Luther Dean | Democratic | 35th |
| Willard Arnold Johnson | Democratic | 35th |
| Edmond A. Decherd Jr. | Democratic | 35th |
| Rienzi Melville Johnston | Democratic | 35th |
| Jeff J. Strickland | Democratic | 36th |
| George W. Dayton | Democratic | 36th |
| James M. Alderdice | Democratic | 36th |
| Charles R. Buchanan | Democratic | 36th |
| Paul DeWitt Page | Democratic | 36th |
| George M. Hopkins | Democratic | 36th |
| Arren C. Buchanan | Democratic | 36th |
| Ed Westbrook | Democratic | 36th |
| Walter D. Caldwell | Democratic | 36th |
| Martin Faust | Democratic | 36th |
| Paul DeWitt Page | Democratic | 37th |
| Charles R. Floyd | Democratic | 37th |
| John Heywood Bailey | Democratic | 37th |
| Archie Parr | Democratic | 37th |
| James Hollins Woods | Democratic | 37th |
| Harry Hertzberg | Democratic | 37th |
| Richard Moberley Dudley | Democratic | 38th |
| William Edward Watts | Democratic | 38th |
| Dan Scott McMillin | Democratic | 38th |
| Edgar E. Witt | Democratic | 38th |
| Charles Alfred Murphy Sr. | Democratic | 38th |
| Isaac Edgar Clark | Democratic | 38th |
| Henry LaFayette Lewis | Democratic | 38th |
| I. D. Fairchild | Democratic | 38th |
| Alvin J. Wirtz | Democratic | 39th |
| William H. Bledsoe | Democratic | 39th |
| James Garrison Strong | Democratic | 39th |
| John Davis | Democratic | 39th |
| Ashley E. Wood | Democratic | 40th |
| Thomas J. Holbrook | Democratic | 40th |
| Tomas G. Pollard | Democratic | 40th |
| Richard S. Bowers | Democratic | 40th |
| Walter C. Woodward | Democratic | 41st |
| Wilfred R. Cousins Sr. | Democratic | 41st |
| Eugene Miller | Democratic | 41st |
| Margie E. Neal | Democratic | 41st |
| Pink L. Parrish | Democratic | 41st |
| Gus Russek | Democratic | 41st |
| Benjamin F. Berkeley | Democratic | 41st |
| Edgar E. Witt | Democratic | 41st |
| Julian P. Greer | Democratic | 41st |
| W. Albert "Cap" Williamson | Democratic | 41st |
| Joseph M. Moore | Democratic | 41st |
| Carl C. Hardin | Democratic | 42nd |
| John W. E. H. Beck | Democratic | 42nd |
| Tom A. DeBerry | Democratic | 42nd |
| Clint C. Small | Democratic | 42nd |
| William E. Thomason | Democratic | 42nd |
| James W. Stevenson | Democratic | 42nd |
| Jacob J. Loy | Democratic | 42nd |
| Charles S. Gainer | Democratic | 42nd |
| Oliver C. Cunningham | Democratic | 42nd |
| H. Grady Woodruff | Democratic | 42nd |
| Walter F. Woodul | Democratic | 43rd |
| Nat Patton | Democratic | 43rd |
| George C. Purl | Democratic | 43rd |
| Welly K. Hopkins | Democratic | 43rd |
| Frank H. Rawlings | Democratic | 43rd |
| Margie E. Neal | Democratic | 43rd |
| William Cecil Murphy | Democratic | 43rd |
| Joseph M. Moore | Democratic | 43rd |
| Walter C. Woodward | Democratic | 43rd |
| Kenneth M. Regan | Democratic | 44th |
| John S. Redditt | Democratic | 44th |
| William Marvin Martin | Democratic | 44th |
| James Emery "Jim" Neal | Democratic | 44th |
| William Robert Poage | Democratic | 44th |
| Wilbourne B. Collie | Democratic | 44th |
| Roy Sanderford | Democratic | 44th |
| Tom A. DeBerry | Democratic | 44th |
| William Dent Pace | Democratic | 45th |
| Claud C. Westerfeld | Democratic | 45th |
| Olan Rogers Van Zandt | Democratic | 45th |
| Claude Isbell | Democratic | 45th |
| Allan Shivers | Democratic | 45th |
| Benjamin G. Oneal | Democratic | 45th |
| Weaver Moore | Democratic | 46th |
| Albert Stone | Democratic | 46th |
| Clay Cotten | Democratic | 47th |
| Rudolph A. Weinert | Democratic | 47th |
| Edwin Harold Beck | Democratic | 47th |
| Henry L. Winfield | Democratic | 47th |
| Vernon Lemens | Democratic | 48th |
| Fred Mauritz | Democratic | 48th |
| A. M. Aikin Jr. | Democratic | 48th |
| George C. Moffett | Democratic | 49th |
| William Graves | Democratic | 49th |
| Ben Ramsey | Democratic | 50th |
| Terrell Claude Chadick | Democratic | 50th |
| Kyle Alfred Vick | Democratic | 51st |
| George C. Morris | Democratic | 51st |
| Grady Hazlewood | Democratic | 51st |
| Wardlow W. Lane | Democratic | 51st |
| Pat M. Bullock | Democratic | 52nd |
| Howard Augustus Carney | Democratic | 52nd |
| Rogers Caswell Kelley | Democratic | 53rd |
| Jimmy Phillips | Democratic | 53rd |
| Gus J. Strauss | Democratic | 53rd |
| Dorsey B. Hardeman | Democratic | 53rd |
| Crawford Martin | Democratic | 54th |
| Neveille H. Colson | Democratic | 54th |
| Ottis E. Lock | Democratic | 55th |
| Carlos C. Ashley Sr. | Democratic | 55th |
| J. Searcy Bracewell Jr. | Democratic | 55th |
| William T. "Bill" Moore | Democratic | 55th |
| Jep S. Fuller | Democratic | 55th |
| George M. Parkhouse | Democratic | 56th |
| Rudolph A. Weinert | Democratic | 56th |
| Jarrard Secrest | Democratic | 56th |
| Andrew Jacob "Andy" Rogers | Democratic | 56th |
| Abraham "Chick" Kazen | Democratic | 56th |
| Frank Owen III | Democratic | 56th |
| Ray Roberts | Democratic | 57th |
| David Ratliff | Democratic | 57th |
| Preston Smith | Democratic | 57th |
| Bruce Anderson Reagan | Democratic | 57th |
| Doyle Henry Willis | Democratic | 57th |
| Bruce Anderson Reagan | Democratic | 57th |
| Charles Ferguson Herring | Democratic | 57th |
| Culp Krueger | Democratic | 57th |
| Martin Dies Jr. | Democratic | 58th |
| Louis Crump | Democratic | 58th |
| Thomas William "Tom" Creighton | Democratic | 59th |
| A. R. "Babe" Schwartz | Democratic | 59th |
| Galloway Calhoun | Democratic | 59th |
| W. N. "Bill" Patman | Democratic | 60th |
| Ralph Hall | Democratic | 60th |
| James Storey "Jim" Bates | Democratic | 60th |
| David Roy Harrington | Democratic | 60th |
| Don Kennard | Democratic | 61st |
| Murray Watson Jr. | Democratic | 61st |
| Horace J. "Doc" Blanchard | Democratic | 61st |
| James Powell Word | Democratic | 61st |
| Criss Cole | Democratic | 61st |
| Jack Hightower | Democratic | 62nd |
| Wallace Eugene "Pete" Snelson | Democratic | 62nd |
| Barbara Jordan | Democratic | 62nd |
| Chet Brooks | Democratic | 62nd |
| Wayne Connally | Democratic | 62nd |
| Charles Wilson | Democratic | 62nd |
| Oscar H. Mauzy | Democratic | 63rd |
| Orland Harold "Ike" Harris | Republican | 63rd |
| Max Sherman | Democratic | 63rd |
| James P. Wallace | Democratic | 63rd |
| Glenn Kothmann | Democratic | 64th |
| H. Tati Santiesteban | Democratic | 64th |
| Betty Andujar | Republican | 65th |
| Don Adams | Democratic | 65th |
| Peyton McKnight | Democratic | 65th |
| Raul L. Longoria | Democratic | 65th |
| William C. Meier | Democratic | 66th |
| Bill Braecklein | Democratic | 66th |
| John Traeger | Democratic | 67th |
| Jack C. Ogg | Democratic | 67th |
| Walter Mengden | Republican | 67th |
| John T. Wilson | Democratic | 67th |
| John Grant Jones | Democratic | 68th |
| Lloyd Doggett | Democratic | 68th |
| Lindon Williams | Democratic | 68th |
| Ray Farabee | Democratic | 69th |
| Carlos F. Truan | Democratic | 69th |
| Vernon Edgar Howard | Democratic | 69th |
| Carlos F. Truan | Democratic | 69th |
| Carl A. Parker | Democratic | 70th |
| Roy Blake Sr. | Democratic | 70th |
| John N. Leedom | Republican | 71st |
| James Eugene "Buster" Brown | Republican | 71st |
| Kent A. Caperton | Democratic | 71st |
| Craig A. Washington | Democratic | 71st |
| Hugh Q. Parmer | Democratic | 71st |
| Bob McFarland | Republican | 71st |
| Robert J. Glasgow | Democratic | 72nd |
| Don B. Henderson | Republican | 72nd |
| William McKinnie "Bill" Sims | Democratic | 72nd |
| John T. Montford | Democratic | 73rd |
| John Whitmire | Democratic | 73rd |
| Gonzalo Barrientos | Democratic | 74th |
| Ken Armbrister | Democratic | 74th |
| Judith Zaffirini | Democratic | 75th |
| Bill Ratliff | Republican | 75th |
| Teel Bivins | Republican | 76th |
| Rodney Ellis | Democratic | 76th |
| Chris Harris | Republican | 77th |
| Mike Moncrief | Democratic | 77th |
| Eddie Lucio Jr. | Democratic | 78th |
| Jane Nelson | Republican | 78th |
| Jeff Wentworth | Republican | 78th |
| Florence Shapiro | Republican | 79th |
| Frank L. Madla | Democratic | 79th |
| Royce West | Democratic | 79th |
| Mario Gallegos Jr. | Democratic | 80th |
| John Carona | Republican | 80th |
| Robert L. Duncan | Republican | 81st (Regular) |
| Troy Fraser | Republican | 81st (Interim) |
| Steve Ogden | Republican | 82nd (Regular) |
| Mike Jackson | Republican | 82nd (Interim) |
| Leticia Van de Putte | Democratic | 83rd (Regular) |
| Craig Estes | Republican | 83rd (Interim) |
| Juan Hinojosa | Democrat | 84th (Regular) |
| Kevin Eltife | Republican | 84th (Interim) |
| Kel Seliger | Republican | 85th (Regular) |
| Robert Nichols | Republican | 85th (Interim) |
| Kirk Watson | Democratic | 86th (Regular) |
| Joan Huffman | Republican | 86th (Interim) |
| Brian Birdwell | Republican | 87th (Regular) |
| Donna Campbell | Republican | 87th (Interim) |
| Kelly Hancock | Republican | 88th (Regular) |
| Charles Schwertner | Republican | 88th (Interim) |
| Brandon Creighton | Republican | 89th (Regular) |
| Charles Perry | Republican | 89th (Interim) |

== See also ==
- List of Texas state legislatures
