= Texas's 17th Senate district =

American legislative district

Texas's 17th State Senate district
Senator
Joan Huffman; R–Houston
- Demographics: 44.6% White; 15.2% Black; 24% Hispanic; 16.4% Asian
- Population: 913,271

District 17 of the Texas Senate is a senatorial district that currently serves all of Colorado, Jackson, Matagorda, and Wharton counties, and portions of Brazoria, Fort Bend, Harris, and Waller counties in the U.S. state of Texas.

The current senator from District 17 is Joan Huffman.

== Biggest cities in the district ==
District 17 has a population of 804,162 with 605,764 that is at voting age from the 2010 census.

	Name	County	Pop. (Note: Population is based on the number of people in the district in that city, not the overall population of that city)
1	Houston	Fort Bend/Harris	322,519
2	Sugar Land	Fort Bend	68,795
3	Missouri City	Fort Bend	31,204
4	Lake Jackson	Brazoria	26,849
5	Bellaire	Harris	16,855

== Election history ==
Election history of District 22 from 1992. (Note: Uncontested primary elections are not shown.)

=== 2024 ===
Texas general election, 2024: Senate District 17
Party	Candidate	Votes	%	±%
Republican	Joan Huffman (Incumbent)	238,328	64.16	−1.17
Democratic	Kathy Cheng	133,127	35.84	+1.17
Majority		105,201	28.32	−2.34
Turnout		371,455		
Republican hold				

=== 2022 ===
Texas general election, 2022: Senate District 17
Party	Candidate	Votes	%	±%
Republican	Joan Huffman (Incumbent)	179,653	65.33	+13.89
Democratic	Rita Lucido	95,320	34.67	−12.13
Majority		84,333	30.66	+26.02
Turnout		274,973		
Republican hold				

=== 2018 ===
Texas general election, 2018: Senate District 17
Party	Candidate	Votes	%	±%
Republican	Joan Huffman (Incumbent)	158,263	51.44	−11.90
Democratic	Rita Lucido	143,978	46.80	+12.89
Libertarian	Lauren LaCount	5,396	1.75	−0.28
Majority		14,285	4.64	−24.79
Turnout		307,637		
Republican hold				

=== 2014 ===
Texas general election, 2014: Senate District 17
Party	Candidate	Votes	%	±%
Republican	Joan Huffman (Incumbent)	113,817	63.34	−14.34
Democratic	Rita Lucido	60,934	33.91	+33.91
Libertarian	George Hardy	3,642	2.03	−11.39
Green	David Courtney	1,303	0.73	−8.17
Majority		52,883	29.43	−34.83
Turnout		179,696		
Republican hold				

=== 2012 ===
Texas general election, 2012: Senate District 17
Party	Candidate	Votes	%	±%
Republican	Joan Huffman (Incumbent)	185,429	77.68	+5.48
Libertarian	Austin Page	32,026	13.42	−3.42
Green	David Courtney	21,252	8.90	+8.90
Majority		153,403	64.26	−2.06
Turnout		238,707		
Republican hold				

=== 2010 ===
Texas general election, 2010: Senate District 17
Party	Candidate	Votes	%	±%
Republican	Joan Huffman (Incumbent)	112,595	83.16	+27.07
Libertarian	Phil Kurtz	22,802	16.84	+16.84
Majority		89,793	66.32	+54.14
Turnout		135,397		
Republican hold				

=== 2008 (special) ===
Texas Special Runoff Election State Senate: Senate District 17
Party	Candidate	Votes	%	±%
Republican	Joan Huffman	24,497	56.09	+29.95
Democratic	Chris Bell	19,176	43.91	+5.52
Majority		5,321	12.18	
Turnout		43,673		
Republican hold				

Texas Special Election, 2008: Senate District 17
Party	Candidate	Votes	%
Democratic	Chris Bell	85,725	38.39
Republican	Joan Huffman	58,359	26.14
Democratic	Stephanie E. Simmons	30,839	13.81
Republican	Austen Furse	22,588	10.12
Republican	Ken Sherman	16,728	7.49
Republican	Grant Harpold	9,056	4.06
Turnout		223,295	

=== 2006 ===
Texas general election, 2006: Senate District 17
Party	Candidate	Votes	%	±%
Republican	Kyle Janek	88,483	77.82	+16.40
Libertarian	Phil Kurtz	25,212	22.81	+22.81
Majority		63,271	55.65	+32.79
Turnout		113,695		−20.99
Republican hold				

=== 2002 ===
Texas general election, 2002: Senate District 17
Party	Candidate	Votes	%	±%
Republican	Kyle Janek	88,393	61.43	−5.99
Democratic	Ronnie Ellen Harrison	55,502	38.57	+5.99
Majority		32,891	22.86	−11.98
Turnout		153,132		−30.34
Republican hold				

==== Special ====
Special election, 5 November 2002: Senate District 17 (Unexpired term)
Party	Candidate	Votes	%	±%
Republican	Kyle Janek	97,588	67.42	−3.18
Democratic	Ronnie Ellen Harrison	47,164	32.58	+3.18
Majority		50,424	34.83	−6.36
Turnout		144,752		+5.52
Republican hold				

Republican primary, 2002: Senate District 17
Candidate		Votes	%	±
✓	Kyle Janek	16,250	65.81	
	Gary M. Polland	8,444	34.19	
Turnout		24,694		

=== 1998 ===
Texas general election, 1998: Senate District 17
Party	Candidate	Votes	%	±%
Republican	J. E. "Buster" Brown	96,846	70.60	−1.99
Democratic	Ronnie Ellen Harrison	40,331	29.40	+1.99
Majority		56,515	41.20	−3.97
Turnout		137,177		−15.77
Republican hold				

=== 1994 ===
Texas general election, 1994: Senate District 17
Party	Candidate	Votes	%	±%
Republican	J. E. "Buster" Brown	117,727	72.58	+12.98
Democratic	Ronnie Ellen Harrison	44,465	27.42	−12.98
Majority		73,262	45.17	+25.96
Turnout		162,192		−20.55
Republican hold				

=== 1992 ===
Texas general election, 1992: Senate District 17
Party	Candidate	Votes	%	±%
Republican	J. E. "Buster" Brown	121,676	59.60	
Democratic	Ronnie Harrison	82,468	40.40	
Majority		39,208	19.21	
Turnout		204,144		
Republican hold				

== District officeholders ==
Legislature	Senator, District 17	Counties in District
1	Alexander H. Phillips	Gonzales, Jackson, Victoria.
2	Alexander H. Phillips	Gonzales, Jackson, Victoria.
3	David Y. Portis	Austin, Colorado, Fort Bend, Lavaca, Wharton.
4	Peter W. Gray	Harris.
5	Mark M. Potter	Galveston.
6	Mark M. Potter	Galveston.
7	Mark M. Potter	Galveston.
8	Mark M. Potter	Galveston.
9	Anthony Martin Branch; David Catchings Dickson	Grimes, Montgomery, Walker.
10	David Catchings Dickson	Grimes, Montgomery, Walker.
11	Benton Randolph	Grimes, Montgomery, Walker.
12	William A. Saylor	Brazos, Burleson, Milam.
13	William A. Saylor	Brazos, Burleson, Milam.
14	Jewett H. Davenport	Bell, Falls, Milam.
15	Walter Moses Burton	Fort Bend, Waller, Wharton.
16	Walter Moses Burton	Fort Bend, Waller, Wharton.
17	Walter Moses Burton	Fort Bend, Waller, Wharton.
18	John Johnson	Collin, Denton.
19	John Johnson	Collin, Denton.
20	William Allen	Collin, Denton.
21	William Allen	Collin, Denton.
22	Henry A. Finch	Collin, Denton.
23	Miles Crowley	Brazoria, Chambers, Galveston, Matagorda, Wharton.
24	Miles Crowley; Morris Lasker	Brazoria, Chambers, Galveston, Matagorda, Wharton.
25	John E. Linn	Brazoria, Chambers, Galveston, Matagorda, Wharton.
26	John E. Linn	Brazoria, Chambers, Galveston, Matagorda, Wharton.
27	Robert V. Davidson	Brazoria, Chambers, Galveston, Matagorda, Wharton.
28	Robert V. Davidson	Brazoria, Chambers, Galveston, Matagorda, Wharton.
29	Robert V. Davidson; William M. Holland	Brazoria, Chambers, Galveston, Matagorda, Wharton.
30	Thomas W. Masterson	Brazoria, Chambers, Galveston, Matagorda, Wharton.
31	Thomas W. Masterson; John E. Kauffman	Brazoria, Chambers, Galveston, Matagorda, Wharton.
32	John E. Kauffman	Brazoria, Chambers, Galveston, Matagorda, Wharton.
33	John E. Kauffman; William L. Hall	Brazoria, Chambers, Galveston, Matagorda, Wharton.
34	William L. Hall	Brazoria, Chambers, Galveston, Matagorda, Wharton.
35	William L. Hall	Brazoria, Chambers, Galveston, Matagorda, Wharton.
36	William L. Hall	Brazoria, Chambers, Galveston, Matagorda, Wharton.
37	William L. Hall; Thomas J. Holbrook	Brazoria, Chambers, Galveston, Matagorda, Wharton.
38	Thomas J. Holbrook	Brazoria, Chambers, Galveston, Matagorda, Wharton.
39	Thomas J. Holbrook	Brazoria, Chambers, Fort Bend, Galveston, Matagorda, Wharton.
40	Thomas J. Holbrook	Brazoria, Chambers, Fort Bend, Galveston, Matagorda, Wharton.
41	Thomas J. Holbrook	Brazoria, Chambers, Fort Bend, Galveston, Matagorda, Wharton.
42	Thomas J. Holbrook	Brazoria, Chambers, Fort Bend, Galveston, Matagorda, Wharton.
43	Thomas J. Holbrook	Brazoria, Chambers, Fort Bend, Galveston, Matagorda, Wharton.
44	Thomas J. Holbrook	Brazoria, Chambers, Fort Bend, Galveston, Matagorda, Wharton.
45	Thomas J. Holbrook	Brazoria, Chambers, Fort Bend, Galveston, Matagorda, Wharton.
46	William E. Stone	Brazoria, Chambers, Fort Bend, Galveston, Matagorda, Wharton.
47	William E. Stone	Brazoria, Chambers, Fort Bend, Galveston, Matagorda, Wharton.
48	William E. Stone	Brazoria, Chambers, Fort Bend, Galveston, Matagorda, Wharton.
49	William E. Stone	Brazoria, Chambers, Fort Bend, Galveston, Matagorda, Wharton.
50	Jimmy Phillips	Brazoria, Chambers, Fort Bend, Galveston, Matagorda, Wharton.
51	Jimmy Phillips	Brazoria, Chambers, Fort Bend, Galveston, Matagorda, Wharton.
52	Jimmy Phillips	Brazoria, Chambers, Fort Bend, Galveston, Matagorda, Wharton.
53	Jimmy Phillips	Brazoria, Chambers, Fort Bend, Galveston, Matagorda.
54	Jimmy Phillips	Brazoria, Chambers, Fort Bend, Galveston, Matagorda.
55	Jimmy Phillips	Brazoria, Chambers, Fort Bend, Galveston, Matagorda.
56	Jimmy Phillips; A. R. "Babe" Schwartz	Brazoria, Chambers, Fort Bend, Galveston, Matagorda.
57	A. R. "Babe" Schwartz	Brazoria, Chambers, Fort Bend, Galveston, Matagorda.
58	A. R. "Babe" Schwartz	Brazoria, Chambers, Fort Bend, Galveston.
59	A. R. "Babe" Schwartz	Brazoria, Chambers, Fort Bend, Galveston.
60	A. R. "Babe" Schwartz	All of Brazoria, Fort Bend, Galveston. Portion of Harris.
61	A. R. "Babe" Schwartz	All of Brazoria, Fort Bend, Galveston. Portion of Harris.
62	A. R. "Babe" Schwartz	All of Brazoria, Fort Bend, Galveston. Portion of Harris.
63	A. R. "Babe" Schwartz	All of Aransas, Brazoria, Calhoun, Galveston, Matagorda. Portion of Harris.
64	A. R. "Babe" Schwartz	All of Aransas, Brazoria, Calhoun, Galveston, Matagorda. Portion of Harris.
65	A. R. "Babe" Schwartz	All of Aransas, Brazoria, Calhoun, Galveston, Matagorda. Portion of Harris.
66	A. R. "Babe" Schwartz	All of Aransas, Brazoria, Calhoun, Galveston, Matagorda. Portion of Harris.
67	J. E. "Buster" Brown	All of Aransas, Brazoria, Calhoun, Galveston, Matagorda. Portion of Harris.
68	J. E. "Buster" Brown	Portions of Brazoria, Fort Bend, Harris.
69	J. E. "Buster" Brown	Portions of Brazoria, Fort Bend, Harris.
70	J. E. "Buster" Brown	Portions of Brazoria, Fort Bend, Harris.
71	J. E. "Buster" Brown	Portions of Brazoria, Fort Bend, Harris.
72	J. E. "Buster" Brown	Portions of Brazoria, Fort Bend, Harris.
73	J. E. "Buster" Brown	Portions of Brazoria, Fort Bend, Harris.
74	J. E. "Buster" Brown	Portions of Brazoria, Fort Bend, Harris.
75	J. E. "Buster" Brown	Portions of Brazoria, Fort Bend, Harris.
76	J. E. "Buster" Brown	Portions of Brazoria, Fort Bend, Harris.
77	J. E. "Buster" Brown	Portions of Brazoria, Fort Bend, Harris.
78	Kyle Janek	Portions of Brazoria, Chambers, Fort Bend, Galveston, Harris, Jefferson.
79	Kyle Janek	Portions of Brazoria, Chambers, Fort Bend, Galveston, Harris, Jefferson.
80	Kyle Janek; Joan Huffman	Portions of Brazoria, Chambers, Fort Bend, Galveston, Harris, Jefferson.
81	Joan Huffman	Portions of Brazoria, Chambers, Fort Bend, Galveston, Harris, Jefferson.
82	Joan Huffman	Portions of Brazoria, Chambers, Fort Bend, Galveston, Harris, Jefferson.
83	Joan Huffman	Portions of Brazoria, Fort Bend, Harris.
84	Joan Huffman	Portions of Brazoria, Fort Bend, Harris.
85	Joan Huffman	Portions of Brazoria, Fort Bend, Harris.
86	Joan Huffman	Portions of Brazoria, Fort Bend, Harris.
87	Joan Huffman	Portions of Brazoria, Fort Bend, Harris.
88	Joan Huffman	All of Colorado, Jackson, Matagorda, Wharton. Portions of Brazoria, Fort Bend, Harris, Waller.
89	Joan Huffman	All of Colorado, Jackson, Matagorda, Wharton. Portions of Brazoria, Fort Bend, Harris, Waller.
