= Texas's 106th House of Representatives district =

American legislative district

Texas's 106th State House of Representatives district
Representative
Jared Patterson; R–Frisco
- Demographics: 55.8% White; 10.9% Black; 16.3% Hispanic; 14.8% Asian
- Population (2020) • Citizens of voting age: 191,093; 136,666

The 106th district of the Texas House of Representatives represents the eastern portion of Denton County. The current representative of this district is Jared Patterson, a Republican from Frisco who has represented the district since 2019 when Pat Fallon vacated the seat to successfully run for Texas Senate, and later went on to serve in the U.S. Congress.

This district represents western Frisco, northeastern parts of the city of Denton, all of The Colony, Aubrey, Pilot Point, Krugerville, and Sanger.

The 106th district contains parts of Lake Lewisville and Ray Roberts Lake. It is located wholly inside Texas State Senate district 30, but is split between Texas U.S. Congressional districts 4 and 26. The district borders Texas State House district 66 to its east, 57 to its west, 65 to its south, and both 62 and 68 to the north.

== Recent election results ==
Texas House District 106 vote by party in recent elections
Year	Democratic	Republican	Other
2024	39.34% 39,640	60.66% 61,119	-
2022	-	100% No election	-
2020	41.49% 52,257	58.51% 73,692	-
2018	41.69% 34,651	58.31% 48,460	-
2016	-	80.80% 55,596	19.20% 13,209
2014	27.53% 9,614	69.93% 24,419	2.54% 886
2012	-	83.17% 41,785	16.63% 8,445

== List of representatives ==
Legislature	Representative	Party	Term start	Term end
23rd	Albert Scales Hawkins	Democratic	1893	1895
24th	James Henry Beall	Democratic	1895	1897
25th	H.E. Crowley	Democratic	1897	1899
26th	William L. Grogan	Democratic	1899	1901
27th	Albert Scales Hawkins	Democratic	1901	1903
28th	William B. Ware	Democratic	1903	1905
29th	William B. Ware	Democratic	1905	1905
29th	John Richard Bowman	Democratic	1906	1907
30th	John Richard Bowman	Democratic	1907	1909
31st	John Richard Bowman	Democratic	1909	1909
31st	Joseph Clark Hunt	Democratic	1910	1911
32nd	Joseph Clark Hunt	Democratic	1911	1913
33rd	Joseph Clark Hunt	Democratic	1913	1915
34th	William Gipson Blackmon	Democratic	1915	1917
35th	William Gipson Blackmon	Democratic	1917	1919
36th	Thomas Jefferson Barrett	Democratic	1919	1921
37th	Charles Hardy Rowland	Democratic	1921	1923
38th	Charles Hardy Rowland	Democratic	1923	1923
38th	Burrett Winston Patterson	Democratic	1923	1925
39th	Matthew Hillsman Hagaman	Democratic	1925	1927
40th	Matthew Hillsman Hagaman	Democratic	1927	1929
41st	Oscar Fitzallen Chastain	Democratic	1933	1935
42nd	Thomas J. Cunningham	Democratic	1931	1933
43rd	Oscar Fitzallen Chastain	Democratic	1933	1935
44th	George Allen Davisson	Democratic	1935	1937
45th	George Allen Davisson	Democratic	1937	1939
46th	Pleasant Lewis Crossley	Democratic	1939	1941
47th	Pleasant Lewis Crossley	Democratic	1941	1941
47th	Lonnie Flewellen	Democratic	1942	1943
48th	Lonnie Flewellen	Democratic	1943	1945
49th	Robert Nathan Grisham	Democratic	1945	1946
50th	Turner Morris Collie	Democratic	1947	1949
51st	Turner Morris Collie	Democratic	1949	1951
52nd	Turner Morris Collie	Democratic	1951	1953
53rd-63rd	Unknown			
64th	Carlyle Smith	Democratic	1975	1977
65th	Carlyle Smith	Democratic	1977	1979
66th	Carlyle Smith	Democratic	1979	1981
67th	Carlyle Smith	Democratic	1981	1983
68th	Carlyle Smith	Democratic	1983	1985
69th	Carlyle Smith	Democratic	1985	1987
70th	Bill Arnold	Democratic	1987	1989
71st	Bill Arnold	Democratic	1989	1991
72nd	Bill Arnold	Democratic	1991	1993
73rd	Ray Allen	Republican	1993	1995
74th	Ray Allen	Republican	1997	1999
75th	Ray Allen	Republican	1997	1999
76th	Ray Allen	Republican	1999	2001
77th	Ray Allen	Republican	2001	2003
78th	Ray Allen	Republican	2003	2005
79th	Ray Allen	Republican	2005	2006
79th	Kirk England	Republican	2006	2007
80th	Kirk England	Republican	2007	2009
81st	Kirk England	Democratic	2009	2011
82nd	Rodney Anderson	Republican	2011	2013
83rd	Pat Fallon	Republican	2013	2015
84th	Pat Fallon	Republican	2015	2017
85th	Pat Fallon	Republican	2017	2019
86th	Jared Patterson	Republican	2019	2021
87th	Jared Patterson	Republican	2021	2023
88th	Jared Patterson	Republican	2023	2025
