= 1962 Texas Senate election =

- November 6, 1962

All 31 seats in the Texas Senate 16 seats needed for a majority
	Majority party	Minority party
Party	Democratic	Republican
Last election	31	0
Seats won	31	0
Seat change	Steady	Steady
Popular vote	1,105,530	267,871
Percentage	80.50%	19.50%
- Senate results by district Democratic hold
President pro tempore before election
Democratic
Elected President pro tempore
Democratic

The 1962 Texas Senate elections took place as part of the biennial United States elections. Texas voters elected state senators in all 31 State Senate districts. The winners of this election served in the 58th Texas Legislature, serving staggered terms, with half of them up for election in 1964 and the other half up in 1966. Term length was determined by the drawing of lots at the opening of the following legislature.

== Background ==
Democrats had controlled the Texas Senate since the 1872 elections. Since the implementation of Jim Crow voting restrictions in the early 1900s, Democrats had held unanimous or nearly unanimous control of the entire state legislature. These legislators were almost exclusively White men, with White women and Hispanic men winning office from time to time. No African American had won any election to the legislature in the entire 20th century up to this point.

=== Redistricting ===
The Texas Legislature, made up exclusively by Democrats, controlled the state's decennial redistricting following the 1960 census. While debating the chamber's redistricting bill, Senator Jep Fuller of Jefferson County filibustered the maps, objecting to the disproportionate distribution of voters among the districts. His own district in 1961 had double the population of the least populous district, and Senator Robert Baker, who supported him, represented Harris County with nine times the population of the least populous district. Fuller's filibuster failed, and attempts to get the Texas Supreme Court to overturn the maps also failed. Districts at the time strictly followed the boundaries of the state's 254 counties with no splits, and the Texas Constitution limited counties to one senator each, even if their population warranted multiple senators.

== Campaign ==
Every seat in the Senate was won by the Democratic nominee. Republicans only put up fifteen nominees across all state senate posts, with the remaining races being decided at the Democratic primary election.

== Results ==
William H. Gardner of The Houston Post reported of the incoming Senate roster that twelve of the 31 members were conservatives, eleven were liberals, and eight were moderates. Ten of the 31 senators were newcomers to the Senate, four of whom had no previous state legislative service.

== Members elected ==
Below are the members elected at the 1962 general election, along with the length of their terms as determined at the beginning of the 1963 legislative session. Members in boldface were not members of the previous legislature.

- District 1: A. M. Aikin Jr. of Paris (4-year)
- **District 2: Jack Boynton Strong** of Longview (2-year)
- District 3: Martin Dies Jr. of Lufkin (2-year)
- **District 4: D. Roy Harrington** of Port Arthur (4-year)
- District 5: Neveille Colson of Navasota (4-year)
- **District 6: Criss Cole** of Houston (4-year)
- District 7: Galloway Calhoun of Tyler (2-year)
- District 8: George Parkhouse of Dallas (4-year)
- **District 9: Ralph Hall** of Rockwall (4-year)
- **District 10: Don Kennard** of Fort Worth (2-year)
- District 11: William T. "Bill" Moore of Bryan (2-year)
- **District 12: J. P. Ward** of Meridian (2-year)
- **District 13: Murray Watson Jr.** of Waco (4-year)
- District 14: Charles F. Herring of Austin (2-year)
- District 15: Culp Krueger of El Campo (4-year)
- District 16: Louis Crump of San Saba (4-year)
- District 17: A.R. "Babe" Schwartz of Galveston (2-year)
- District 18: Bill Patman of Ganado
- **District 19: Walter Richter** of Gonzales (4-year)
- District 20: Bruce Reagan of Corpus Christi (2-year)
- District 21: Abraham Kazen of Laredo (2-year)
- District 22: Tom Creighton of Mineral Wells (4-year)
- District 23: George Moffett of Chillicothe (2-year)
- District 24: David Ratliff of Stamford (2-year)
- District 25: Dorsey B. Hardeman of San Angelo (2-year)
- **District 26: Franklin Spears** of San Antonio (4-year)
- **District 27: James Bates** of Edinburg (4-year)
- **District 28: Doc Blanchard** of Lubbock (2-year)
- District 29: Frank Owen of Midland (2-year)
- District 30: Andrew J. Rogers of Childress (4-year)
- District 31: Grady Hazlewood of Amarillo (4-year)
