= 1988 Texas Senate election =

- November 8, 1988

15 of the 31 seats in the Texas Senate 16 seats needed for a majority
	Majority party	Minority party
Party	Democratic	Republican
Last election	25	6
Seats won	23	8
Seat change	▼2	▲2
- Senate results by district Democratic hold Republican hold Republican gain No election
President Pro Tempore before election
Democratic
Elected President Pro Tempore
Democratic

The 1988 Texas Senate elections took place as part of the biennial United States elections. Texas voters elected state senators in 15 of the 31 State Senate. The winners of this election served in the 71st Texas Legislature.

== Background ==
Democrats had controlled the Texas Senate since the 1872 elections.

== Results ==
Republicans gained two seats in the 1988 elections, weakening, though not breaking, the Democratic supermajority.

=== Results by district ===
District	Democratic		Republican		Others		Total		Result
District	Votes	%	Votes	%	Votes	%	Votes	%	Result
District 1	84,333	49.31%	86,682	50.69%	-	-	171,015	100.00%	Republican gain
District 2	95,255	53.87%	81,561	46.13%	-	-	176,816	100.00%	Democratic hold
District 3	130,539	93.74%	-	-	8,716	6.26%	139,255	100.00%	Democratic hold
District 4	-	100.00%	-	-	-	-	-	100.00%	Democratic hold
District 8	-	-	-	100.00%	-	-	-	100.00%	Republican hold
District 9	140,762	93.62%	-	-	9,593	6.38%	150,355	100.00%	Democratic hold
District 14	163,130	66.58%	74,694	30.48%	7,196	2.94%	245,020	100.00%	Democratic hold
District 17	-	-	124,137	89.72%	14,217	10.28%	138,354	100.00%	Republican hold
District 20	-	100.00%	-	-	-	-	-	100.00%	Democratic hold
District 22	119,456	55.66%	95,177	44.34%	-	-	214,633	100.00%	Democratic hold
District 24	-	100.00%	-	-	-	-	-	100.00%	Democratic hold
District 26	73,807	43.35%	93,869	55.14%	2,564	1.51%	170,240	100.00%	Republican hold
District 28	117,766	94.39%	-	-	7,001	5.61%	124,767	100.00%	Democratic hold
District 30	94,629	59.32%	64,899	40.68%	-	-	159,528	100.00%	Democratic hold
District 31	60,123	38.82%	94,747	61.18%	-	-	154,870	100.00%	Republican gain
Total	–	–	–	–	–	–	–	100.00%	Source:
