= 1964 Texas Senate election =

- November 3, 1964

15 out of 31 seats in the Texas Senate 16 seats needed for a majority
	Majority party	Minority party
Party	Democratic	Republican
Last election	31	0
Seats won	31	0
Seat change	Steady	Steady
Popular vote	805,179	145,897
Percentage	84.66%	15.34%
Swing	▲4.16%	▼4.16%
- Senate results by district Democratic hold No election
President pro tempore before election
Democratic
Elected President pro tempore
Democratic

The 1964 Texas Senate election was held on November 3, 1964, to determine which party would control the Texas Senate for the following two years in the 59th Texas Legislature. Fifteen out of the 31 seats in the Texas Senate were up for election to four-year terms, but these terms were cut short following the election by the U.S. Supreme Court decision Reynolds v. Sims, which forced the state to undergo mid-decade redistricting to rectify egregious malapportionment among Senate districts. Democrats maintained control of every seat in the Senate.

== Background ==
Democrats had controlled the Texas Senate since the 1872 elections. Since the implementation of Jim Crow voting restrictions in the early 1900s, Democrats had held unanimous or nearly unanimous control of the entire state legislature. These legislators were almost exclusively White men, with White women and Hispanic men winning office from time to time. No African American had won any election to the legislature in the entire 20th century up to this point.

=== Malapportionment ===
Several senate districts had wildly disproportionate populations, with ratios as large as 9:1 in the most extreme cases. The Texas Constitution explicitly limited counties to a maximum of one senator each, even if their populations would have called for more than one in an equally-apportioned system. Due to this, any attempts to challenge the maps on these grounds in state courts were denied. Voting rights advocates shifted their efforts to federal courts in 1963, but proceedings moved slowly, awaiting direction from the U.S. Supreme Court in related cases. The challenge had not been resolved by the time of the 1964 elections, so the courts allowed the state to hold them under the original maps.
