= 56th Texas Legislature =

The 56th Texas Legislature met from January 13, 1959, to May 7, 1959, and in three special sessions from May to August of that same year. All members present during this session were elected in the 1958 general elections.

== Sessions ==
Regular Session: January 13, 1959 – May 12, 1959

1st Called Session: May 18, 1959 – June 16, 1959

2nd Called Session: June 17, 1959 – July 16, 1959

3rd Called Session: July 17, 1959 – Aug 6, 1959

== Party summary ==
=== Senate ===
Affiliation	Members	Note
Democratic Party	31	
Total	31	

=== House ===
Affiliation	Members	Note
Democratic Party	150	
Total	150	

== Officers ==
=== Senate ===
- Lieutenant Governor: Ben Ramsey (D)
- President Pro Tempore: George Parkhouse (D), Rudolph A. Weinert (D),

Jarrard Secrest (D), Andrew J. “Andy” Rogers (D), Abraham “Chick” Kazen (D), Frank Owen, III (D)

=== House ===
- Speaker of the House: Waggoner Carr (D)

== Members ==
=== Senate ===
Dist. 1

- Howard A. Carney (D), Atlanta

Dist. 2

- Wardlow Lane (D), Center

Dist. 3

- Martin Dies, Jr. (D), Lufkin

Dist. 4

- Jep Fuller (D), Port Arthur

Dist. 5

- Neveille H. Colson (D), Navasota

Dist. 6

- Robert W. Baker (D), Houston

Dist. 7

- Bill D. Wood (D), Tyler

Dist. 8

- George M. Parkhouse (D), Dallas

Dist. 9

- Ray Roberts (D), McKinney

Dist. 10

- Doyle Willis (D), Fort Worth

Dist. 11

- William T. "Bill" Moore (D), Bryan

Dist. 12

- Crawford Martin (D), Hillsboro

Dist. 13

- Jarrard Secrest (D), Temple

Dist. 14

- Charles F. Herring (D), Austin

Dist. 15

- Culp Krueger (D), El Campo

Dist. 16

- Louis Crump (D), San Saba

Dist. 17

- Jimmy Phillips (D), Angleton

Dist. 18

- William S. Fly (D), Victoria

Dist. 19

- Rudolph A. Weinert (D), Seguin

Dist. 20

- Bruce Reagan (D), Corpus Christi

Dist. 21

- Abraham Kazen (D), Laredo

Dist. 22

- Wayne Wagonseller (D), Stoneburg

Dist. 23

- George Moffett (D), Chillicothe

Dist. 24

- David Ratliff (D), Stamford

Dist. 25

- Dorsey B. Hardeman (D), San Angelo

Dist. 26

- Henry B. Gonzalez (D), San Antonio

Dist. 27

- Hubert R. Hudson (D), Brownsville

Dist. 28

- Preston Smith (D), Lubbock

Dist. 29

- Frank Owen, III (D), El Paso

Dist. 30

- Andrew J. "Andy" Rogers (D), Childress

Dist. 31

- Grady Hazlewood (D), Amarillo

=== House ===
The House was composed of 149 Democrats and one Independent. (Note: Representative Howard Green had been elected to previous legislatures as an Independent, but he served as an Independent during this legislature.)

House members included future Congressmen Robert Eckhardt, Kika de la Garza and Joe Pool, as well as future Lieutenant Governor Bob Bullock, future Texas Attorney General Waggoner Carr, and future Land Commissioner Jerry Sadler.

== Sources ==
- Legislative Reference Library of Texas,
