= Don Kennard =

American politician (1929–2011)

Don Kennard (May 6, 1929 – March 17, 2011) was a United States politician for the Democratic Party representing Fort Worth and Tarrant County in both the Texas House of Representatives and the Texas Senate from 1953 to 1973. Kennard represented the former District 60–3 in the Texas House from 53rd through the 62nd Legislatures, and the Tenth District in the 58th through the 62nd Legislatures.

Kennard was an early proponent of a wide variety of conservation-related initiatives in the Legislature. He is particularly celebrated for his success in securing dedicated funding for the Texas Parks and Wildlife Department from cigarette taxes.

Kennard was indirectly responsible for the Fort Worth Zoo obtaining a baby elephant in 1964.

Following his service in the Legislature, Kennard taught and led research efforts at the Lyndon B. Johnson School of Public Affairs at the University of Texas. He is especially noted for coordinating the Natural Area Survey, which provided the blueprint for many years of later public land acquisitions of Texas areas of special ecological, scenic, or historic value.

Texas House of Representatives
Preceded by New district	Member of the Texas House of Representatives from District 60-3 (Fort Worth); 1953–1963	Succeeded by Hugh Q. Parmer
Texas Senate
Preceded by Doyle Willis	Texas State Senator from District 10 (Fort Worth); 1963–1973	Succeeded by Bill Meier
