= Sue Schechter =

American politician (born 1952)

Sue Ann Schechter

Member of the Texas House of Representatives from the 134th district
- In office January 8, 1991 – January 10, 1995
- Preceded by: Brad Wright
- Succeeded by: Kyle Janek

Personal details
- Born: November 11, 1952 (age 73) Granbury, Texas, United States
- Party: Democratic
- Education: University of North Texas (BBA, 1974); South Texas College of Law (JD, 1981)

Sue Ann Smith Schechter (born November 11, 1952) is an American politician. She served two terms in the Texas House of Representatives as a Democrat.

== Early life and education ==
Schechter was born on November 11, 1952 in Granbury, Texas. She received her Bachelor of Business Administration from the University of North Texas in 1974, and her Juris Doctor from South Texas College of Law in 1981.

== Career ==
Outside of politics, Schechter worked as an insurance claims adjuster and lawyer.

Schechter was first elected in 1990, when she defeated Republican challenger Bob Higley, becoming the first Democrat to represent the 134th district since its creation in the 1970s. She was re-elected in 1992. During her time in the House, Schechter authored several bills related to mental health and children's issues.

In August 1993, Schechter announced that she would not seek re-election in 1994.

From 1998 to 2002, Schechter served as the chair of the Harris County Democratic Party.
