= 57th Texas Legislature =

The 57th Texas Legislature met from January 10, 1961, to May 29, 1961, in Regular Session. Three special sessions were held during 1961 and 1962 as well. All members present during this session were elected in the 1962 general elections.

== Sessions ==
Regular Session: January 10, 1961 - May 29, 1961
1st Called Session: July 10, 1961 - August 8, 1961
2nd Called Session: August 10, 1961 - August 14, 1961
3rd Called Session: January 3, 1962 - February 1, 1962

== Party summary ==
=== Senate ===
| Affiliation | Members | Note |
|---|---|---|
| Democratic Party | 31 | |
| Total | 31 | |

=== House ===
| Affiliation | Members | Note |
|---|---|---|
| Democratic Party | 148 | |
| Republican Party | 2 | |
| Total | 150 | |

== Officers ==
=== Senate ===
- Lieutenant Governor: Ben Ramsey (D)
- President Pro Tempore (Regular Session): Ray Roberts (D)
- President Pro Tempore (1st Called Session): Preston Smith (D)
- President Pro Tempore (2nd Called Session): Doyle H. Willis (D)
- President Pro Tempore (3rd Called Session): Charles F. Herring (D)

=== House ===
- Speaker of the House: James A. Turman (D)

== Members ==
=== Senate ===
Dist. 1

- A.M. Aikin, Jr. (D), Paris

Dist. 2

- Wardlow Lane (D), Center

Dist. 3

- Martin Dies, Jr. (D), Lufkin

Dist. 4

- Jep Fuller (D), Port Arthur

Dist. 5

- Neveille Colson (D), Navasota

Dist. 6

- Robert W. Baker (D), Houston

Dist. 7

- Galloway Calhoun (D), Tyler

Dist. 8

- George Parkhouse (D), Dallas

Dist. 9

- Ray Roberts (D), McKinney

Dist. 10

- Doyle Willis (D), Fort Worth

Dist. 11

- William T. "Bill" Moore (D), Bryan

Dist. 12

- Crawford Martin (D), Hillsboro

Dist. 13

- Jarrard Secrest (D), Temple

Dist. 14

- Charles F. Herring (D), Austin

Dist. 15

- Culp Krueger (D), El Campo

Dist. 16

- Louis Crump (D), San Saba

Dist. 17

- A.R. "Babe" Schwartz (D), Galveston

Dist. 18

- W.N. "Bill" Patman (D), Ganado

Dist. 19

- Rudolph A. Weinert (D), Seguin

Dist. 20

- Bruce Reagan (D), Corpus Christi

Dist. 21

- Abraham Kazen (D), Laredo

Dist. 22

- Tom Creighton (D), Mineral Wells

Dist. 23

- George Moffett (D), Chillicothe

Dist. 24

- David Ratliff (D), Stamford

Dist. 25

- Dorsey B. Hardeman (D), San Angelo

Dist. 26

- Henry Gonzalez (D), San Antonio

Dist. 27

- Hubert R. Hudson (D), Brownsville

Dist. 28

- Preston Smith (D), Lubbock

Dist. 29

- Frank Owen (D), Midland

Dist. 30

- Andrew J. Rogers (D), Childress

Dist. 31

- Grady Hazlewood (D), Amarillo
