= Kyle Janek =

American politician

Member of the Texas Senate from the 17th district
- In office November 19, 2002 – June 2, 2008
- Preceded by: J. E. "Buster" Brown
- Succeeded by: Joan Huffman

Member of the Texas House of Representatives from the 134th district
- In office January 10, 1995 – November 19, 2002
- Preceded by: Sue Schechter
- Succeeded by: Martha Wong

Personal details
- Born: January 10, 1958 (age 68) Galveston, Texas, U.S.
- Party: Republican
- Spouse: Shannon
- Education: Texas A&M University
- Profession: Anesthesiologist

Kyle Janek (born January 10, 1958) is an American physician and former Republican member of the Texas Senate, having represented District 17 from November 2002 until June 2, 2008. The district includes portions of Harris, Brazoria, Fort Bend, Galveston, and Jefferson counties. Janek was not a candidate for renomination to the state Senate in the Republican primary held on March 4.

Janek resigned the seat, and Governor Rick Perry called a special election to coincide with the regular November 4 general election to fill the two years remaining in the term. Republican Joan Huffman, a former felony court judge from Houston and Democrat Chris Bell, a former U.S. representative who was Perry's 2006 election opponent, led the field and went into a December 16 runoff. Huffman ultimately prevailed, 56-44 percent. She becomes the sixth woman serving in the state Senate.

== Biography ==
An anesthesiologist by training, Janek has served in the Texas Legislature as a Republican since 1994. He received an M.D. from the University of Texas Medical Branch in Galveston in 1983 and has since practiced medicine. Janek is the son of former Galveston County Commissioner Eddie Janek Sr. He is the brother of Galveston politician Eddie Janek Jr., who has previously sought county office.

In 1992 Janek entered the Republican primary for Texas State Representative District 134 against two opponents, Mike Shelby and Tim Turner. Janek prevailed against Shelby, later a U.S. Attorney, in the runoff, but he lost the general election to Democrat Sue Schechter, even though the District was almost 60 percent Republican. In 1994, when Schechter chose not to seek re-election, Janek was elected. He served in the Texas House of Representatives until 2002, when he ran for the Texas Senate. Janek sought the seat being vacated by longtime District 17 Senator J. E. "Buster" Brown. Janek defeated attorney Gary M. Polland in the Republican primary, and then prevailed against Democratic candidate Ronnie Ellen Harrison in the general election. He was reelected again in 2006 over a Libertarian Party opponent.

Since being elected to the Senate, Janek has focused his legislative efforts on property tax reform, and the sponsorship of a state program to prevent steroid abuse among high school athletes.

On September 1, 2012, Janek began serving as the Executive Commissioner to the Texas Health and Human Services Commission.

== 2008 election ==
Janek resigned his Senate seat in June 2008. Joan Huffman won the subsequent special election to replace Janek.

== Election history ==
=== Most recent election ===
==== 2006 ====
Texas general election, 2006: Senate District 17
Party	Candidate	Votes	%	±%
Republican	Kyle Janek	88,483	77.82	+16.40
Libertarian	Phil Kurtz	25,212	22.81	+22.81
Majority		63,271	55.65%	+32.79
Turnout		113,695		−20.99
Republican hold				

=== Previous elections ===
==== 2002 ====
Texas general election, 2002: Senate District 17
Party	Candidate	Votes	%	±%
Republican	Kyle Janek	88,393	61.43	−5.99
Democratic	Ronnie Ellen Harrison	55,502	38.57	+5.99
Majority		32,891	22.86	−11.98
Turnout		153,132		−30.34
Republican hold				

Special election, 5 November 2002: Senate District 17 (Unexpired term)
Party	Candidate	Votes	%	±%
Democratic	Ronnie Ellen Harrison	47,164	32.58	+3.18
Republican	Kyle Janek	97,588	67.42	−3.18
Majority		50,424	34.83	−6.36
Turnout		144,752		+5.52
Republican hold				

Republican primary, 2002: Senate District 7
Candidate		Votes	%	±
	Gary M. Polland	8,444	34.19	
✓	Kyle Janek	16,250	65.81	
Turnout		24,694		

==== 2000 ====
House District 134
Party	Candidate	Votes	%	±%
Republican	Kyle Janek	20,764	58.89	−1.41
Democratic	Michael Skadden	14,494	41.11	+1.41
Majority		6,270	17.78	−2.82
Turnout		35,258		+57.17
Republican hold				

==== 1998 ====
House District 134
Party	Candidate	Votes	%	±%
Republican	Kyle Janek	13,527	60.30	−39.70
Democratic	Mike Laster	8,906	39.70	+39.70
Majority		4,621	20.60	−79.40
Turnout		22,433		+1.75
Republican hold				

==== 1996 ====
House District 134
Party	Candidate	Votes	%	±%
Republican	Kyle Janek	22,048	100.00	+32.79
Majority		22,048	100.00	+63.37
Turnout		22,048		−4.62
Republican hold				

==== 1994 ====
Texas general election, 1994: House District 134
Party	Candidate	Votes	%	±%
Democratic	Bruce Reeves	7,070	30.58	−19.56
Republican	Kyle Janek	15,536	67.21	+9.60
Libertarian	Paul Elliott	509	2.20	−0.04
Majority		8,466	36.63	+34.08
Turnout		23,115		−33.06
Republican gain from Democratic				

Republican primary, 1994: Texas House of Representatives, District 134|House District 134
Candidate		Votes	%	±
	Kathleen Ballafant	1,352	24.44	
✓	Kyle Janek	4,180	75.56	
Turnout		5,532		−14.18

==== 1992 ====
Texas general election, 1992: House District 134
Party	Candidate	Votes	%	±%
Democratic	Sue Schechter	17,317	50.15	
Republican	Kyle Janek	16,439	47.61	
Libertarian	Clint Ponton	774	2.24	
Majority		878	2.54	
Turnout		34,530		
Democratic hold				

Republican primary runoff, 1992: House District 134
Candidate		Votes	%	±
✓	Kyle Janek	1,756	51.18	
	Mike Shelby	1,675	48.82	
Turnout		3,431		

Republican primary, 1992: House District 134
Candidate		Votes	%	±
✓	Kyle Janek	2,242	34.78	
✓	Mike Shelby	2,172	33.70	
	Tim Turner	2,032	31.52	
Turnout		6,446		

Texas House of Representatives
Preceded by Sue Schechter	Member of the Texas House of Representatives from District 134 (Houston); 1995–2002	Succeeded by Martha Wong
Texas Senate
Preceded by J. E. "Buster" Brown	Texas State Senator from District 17 (Houston); 2002-2008	Succeeded by Joan Huffman
