= 55th Texas Legislature =

The 55th Texas Legislature met from January 8, 1957, to May 23, 1957, and in two special sessions in November - December of that same year. All members present during this session were elected in the 1956 general elections.

== Sessions ==
Regular Session: January 8, 1957 - May 23, 1957

1st Called Session: October 14, 1957 - November 12, 1957

2nd Called Session: November 13, 1957 - December 3, 1957

== Party summary ==
=== Senate ===
Affiliation	Members	Note
Democratic Party	31	
Total	31	

=== House ===
Affiliation	Members	Note
Democratic Party	150	
Total	150	

== Officers ==
=== Senate ===
- Lieutenant Governor: Ben Ramsey (D)
- President Pro Tempore: Ottis E. Lock (D), Carlos C. Ashley Sr. (D),

Searcy Bracewell (D), William T. "Bill" Moore (D) and Jep S. Fuller (D)

=== House ===
- Speaker of the House: Waggoner Carr (D)

== Members ==
=== Senate ===
Dist. 1

- Howard A. Carney (D), Atlanta

Dist. 2

- Wardlow Lane (D), Center

Dist. 3

- Ottis E. Lock (D), Lufkin

Dist. 4

- Jep Fuller (D), Port Arthur

Dist. 5

- Neveille H. Colson (D), Navasota

Dist. 6

- James E. Taylor (D), Kerens

Dist. 7

- Bill D. Wood (D), Tyler

Dist. 8

- George M. Parkhouse (D), Dallas

Dist. 9

- Ray Roberts (D), McKinney

Dist. 10

- Doyle Willis (D), Fort Worth

Dist. 11

- William T. "Bill" Moore (D), Bryan

Dist. 12

- Crawford Martin (D), Hillsboro

Dist. 13

- Jarrard Secrest (D), Temple

Dist. 14

- Charles F. Herring (D), Austin

Dist. 15

- Culp Krueger (D), El Campo

Dist. 16

- Searcy Bracewell (D), Houston

Dist. 17

- Jimmy Phillips (D), Angleton

Dist. 18

- William S. Fly (D), Victoria

Dist. 19

- Rudolph A. Weinert (D), Seguin

Dist. 20

- Bruce Reagan (D), Corpus Christi

Dist. 21

- Abraham Kazen (D), Laredo

Dist. 22

- Wayne Wagonseller (D), Stoneburg

Dist. 23

- George Moffett (D), Chillicothe

Dist. 24

- David Ratliff (D), Stamford

Dist. 25

- Dorsey B. Hardeman (D), San Angelo

Dist. 26

- Henry B. Gonzalez (D), San Antonio

Dist. 27

- Hubert R. Hudson (D), Brownsville

Dist. 28

- Preston Smith (D), Lubbock

Dist. 29

- Frank Owen, III (D), El Paso

Dist. 30

- Andrew J. "Andy" Rogers (D), Childress

Dist. 31

- Grady Hazlewood (D), Amarillo

=== House ===
The House was composed of 150 Democrats.

House members included future federal judge Barefoot Sanders and future Congressmen Kika de la Garza and Joe Pool, as well as future Lieutenant Governor Bob Bullock, future Texas Attorney General Waggoner Carr, and future Land Commissioner Jerry Sadler.

== Sources ==
- Legislative Reference Library of Texas,
