= 54th Texas Legislature =

The 54th Texas Legislature met from January 11, 1955, to June 7, 1955. All members present during this session were elected in the 1954 general elections.

== Sessions ==
Regular Session: January 11, 1955 - June 7, 1955

== Party summary ==
=== Senate ===
Affiliation	Members	Note
Democratic Party	31	
Total	31	

=== House ===
Affiliation	Members	Note
Democratic Party	150	
Total	150	

== Officers ==
=== Senate ===
- Lieutenant Governor: Ben Ramsey (D)
- President Pro Tempore: Crawford Martin (D)
  Neveille H. Colson (D)

=== House ===
- Speaker of the House: Jim T. Lindsey (D)

== Members ==
=== Senate ===
Dist. 1

- Howard A. Carney (D), Atlanta

Dist. 2

- Wardlow Lane (D), Center

Dist. 3

- Ottis E. Lock (D), Lufkin

Dist. 4

- Jep Fuller (D), Port Arthur

Dist. 5

- Neveille H. Colson (D), Navasota

Dist. 6

- James E. Taylor (D), Kerens

Dist. 7

- Warren McDonald (D), Tyler

Dist. 8

- George M. Parkhouse (D), Dallas

Dist. 9

- Ray Roberts (D), McKinney

Dist. 10

- Doyle Willis (D), Fort Worth

Dist. 11

- William T. "Bill" Moore (D), Bryan

Dist. 12

- Crawford Martin (D), Hillsboro

Dist. 13

- Jarrard Secrest (D), Temple

Dist. 14

- Johnnie B. Rogers (D), Austin

Dist. 15

- Gus J. Strauss (D), Hallettsville

Dist. 16

- Searcy Bracewell (D), Houston

Dist. 17

- Jimmy Phillips (D), Angleton

Dist. 18

- William S. Fly (D), Victoria

Dist. 19

- Rudolph A. Weinert (D), Seguin

Dist. 20

- William H. Shireman (D), Corpus Christi

Dist. 21

- Abraham Kazen (D), Laredo

Dist. 22

- Wayne Wagonseller (D), Stoneburg

Dist. 23

- George Moffett (D), Chillicothe

Dist. 24

- David Ratliff (D), Stamford

Dist. 25

- Dorsey B. Hardeman (D), San Angelo

Dist. 26

- Oswald Latimer (D), San Antonio

Dist. 27

- Rogers Kelly (D), Edinburg

Dist. 28

- Keith Kelly (D), Fort Worth

Dist. 29

- Frank Owen, III (D), El Paso

Dist. 30

- Andrew J. "Andy" Rogers (D), Childress

Dist. 31

- Grady Hazlewood (D), Amarillo

=== House ===
The House was composed of 150 Democrats.

House members included future Governor Dolph Briscoe, future federal judge Barefoot Sanders and future Congressmen Kika de la Garza and Joe Pool, as well as future Texas Attorney General Waggoner Carr, and future Texas Agriculture Commissioner Jack Hightower along with future Land Commissioner Jerry Sadler.

== Sources ==
- Legislative Reference Library of Texas,
