= 86th Texas Legislature =

←	85th	87th	→
- The Seal of Texas

Overview
- Legislative body: Texas State Legislature
- Jurisdiction: Texas
- Term: January 8, 2019 – May 27, 2019
- Election: 2018 general election

Senate
- Members: 31
- President of the Senate: Dan Patrick (R)
- President pro tempore: Kirk Watson (D–14) (regular session) * Joan Huffman (R–17) * (Ad Interim)
- Party control: Republican

House of Representatives
- Members: 149
- Speaker: Dennis Bonnen (R–21)
- Speaker Pro Tempore: Joe Moody (D–78)
- Party control: Republican

The 86th Texas Legislature began on January 8, 2019, and adjourned four months later on May 27, 2019. All members of the House and Senate were elected in the 2018 general election. The session was popularly called the 'kumbaya session" due to the relative lack of political infighting or bitter policy debates.

During the interim following the session, a scandal involving the Speaker of the House Dennis Bonnen, led to him announcing his decision to not run for reelection.

== House of Representatives ==
Members of the Texas House of Representatives for the 86th Texas Legislature were elected in the 2018 Texas House of Representatives election.

== Senate ==
Members of the Texas Senate for the 86th Texas Legislature were elected in the 2016 Texas State Senate election and 2018 Texas State Senate election. The 31 Senators included 19 Republicans and 12 Democrats.

Senators in the 86th Texas Legislature
Senator	Party	District	First elected
Bryan Hughes (politician)	R	1	2016
Bob Hall	R	2	2014
Robert Nichols (politician)	R	3	2007
Brandon Creighton	R	4	2014
Charles Schwertner	R	5	2012
Carol Alvarado	D	6	2018
Paul Bettencourt	R	7	2014
Angela Paxton	R	8	2018
Kelly Hancock	R	9	2012
Beverly Powell	D	10	2018
Larry Taylor (politician)	R	11	2012
Jane Nelson	R	12	1992
Borris Miles	D	13	2016
Kirk Watson	D	14	2006
John Whitmire	D	15	1982
Nathan Johnson	D	16	2018
Joan Huffman	R	17	2008
Lois Kolkhorst	R	18	2014
Pete Flores	R	19	2018
Juan Hinojosa	D	20	2003?
Judith Zaffirini	D	21	1986
Brian Birdwell	R	22	2010
Royce West	D	23	1992
Dawn Buckingham	R	24	2016
Donna Campbell	R	25	2012
Jose Menendez	D	26	2014
Eddie Lucio Jr.	D	27	1991
Charles Perry (Texas politician)	R	28	2014
José R. Rodríguez	D	29	2010
Pat Fallon	R	30	2018
Kel Seliger	R	31	2004

- https://ericwoomer.com/resources/a-recap-of-the-86th-texas-legislative-session
- https://www.texastribune.org/2019/12/27/2019-86th-texas-legislature/
