= 52nd Texas Legislature =

The 52nd Texas Legislature convened from January 9 to June 8, 1951. All members present during this session were elected in the 1950 general elections.

== Sessions ==
Regular Session: January 9, 1951 – June 8, 1951

== Party summary ==
=== Senate ===
Affiliation	Members	Note
Democratic Party	31	
Total	31	

=== House ===
Affiliation	Members	Note
Democratic Party	149	
Republican Party	1	
Total	150	

== Officers ==
=== Senate ===
- Lieutenant Governor: Ben Ramsey (D)
- President Pro Tempore: Pat M. Bullock (D)

=== House ===
- Speaker of the House: Reuben Senterfitt (D)

== Members ==
=== Senate ===
Dist. 1

- Howard A. Carney (D), Atlanta

Dist. 2

- Wardlow Lane (D), Center

Dist. 3

- Ottis E. Lock (D), Lufkin

Dist. 4

- Jep Fuller (D), Port Arthur

Dist. 5

- Mrs. Neveille H. Colson (D), Navasota

Dist. 6

- James E. Taylor (D), Kerens

Dist. 7

- Warren McDonald (D), Tyler

Dist. 8

- A. Aiken, Jr. (D), Paris

Dist. 9

- Joe Carter (D), Sherman

Dist. 10

- Joe Russell (D), Royse City

Dist. 11

- George Parkhouse (D), Dallas

Dist. 12

- Crawford Martin (D), Hillsboro

Dist. 13

- Kyle Vick (D), Waco

Dist. 14

- William T. "Bill" Moore (D), Bryan

Dist. 15

- Gus J. Strauss (D), Hallettsville

Dist. 16

- Searcy Bracewell (D), Houston

Dist. 17

- Jimmy Phillips (D), Angleton

Dist. 18

- John J. Bell (D), Cuero

Dist. 19

- Rudolph A. Weinert (D), Seguin

Dist. 20

- Carlos Ashley (D), Llano

Dist. 21

- W. A. Shofner (D), Temple

Dist. 22

- Wayne Wagonseller (D), Stoneburg

Dist. 23

- George Moffett (D), Chillicothe

Dist. 24

- Pat Bullock (D), Colorado City

Dist. 25

- Dorsey B. Hardeman (D), San Angelo

Dist. 26

- Walter Tynan (D), San Antonio

Dist. 27

- Rogers Kelly (D), Edinburg

Dist. 28

- Keith Kelly (D), Fort Worth

Dist. 29

- Hill D. Hudson (D), Pecos

Dist. 30

- Kilmer B. Corbin (D), Lamesa

Dist. 31

- Grady Hazlewood (D), Amarillo

=== House ===
The House was composed of 149 Democrats and 1 Republican. The lone Republican, Edward T. Dicker of Dallas was the first Republican elected to the Texas legislature in 20 years. House members included future Governor Dolph Briscoe, and future Congressmen Abraham Kazen and J.T. Rutherford and future Texas Attorney General Waggoner Carr.

== Sources ==
- Legislative Reference Library of Texas,
