= Joan Huffman =

American politician (born 1956)

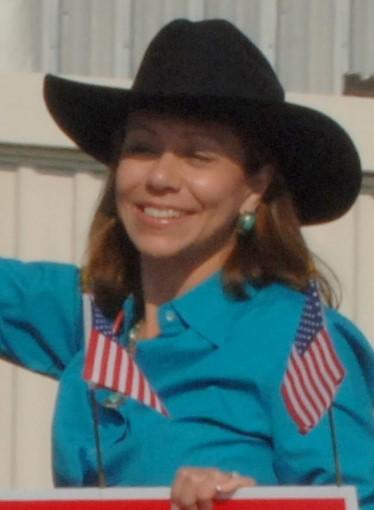
- Huffman in 2008

President pro tempore of the Texas Senate
- In office May 27, 2019 – January 12, 2021
- Preceded by: Kirk Watson
- Succeeded by: Brian Birdwell

Member of the Texas Senate from the 17th district
- Incumbent
- Assumed office December 29, 2008
- Preceded by: Kyle Janek

Personal details
- Born: August 17, 1956 (age 69) Southside Place, Texas, U.S.
- Party: Republican
- Spouse: Keith Lawyer
- Children: 1
- Education: Louisiana State University (BA); South Texas College of Law (JD)
- Website: Office website Campaign website

Joan J. Huffman (born August 17, 1956) is an American politician who has represented the 17th district in the Texas Senate since 2008. A member of the Republican Party, the district includes portions of Brazoria, Fort Bend, and Harris county.

On the last day of the 86th Legislature, she was chosen by her colleagues—Democrats and Republicans—to serve as president pro tempore.

== Background ==
A native of Houston, Huffman holds a Bachelor of Arts degree from Louisiana State University in Baton Rouge and a Juris Doctor degree from the South Texas College of Law in Houston. Prior to her Senate tenure, Huffman was judge of the 183rd Criminal District Court in Harris County. Prior to the judgeship she was chief felony prosecutor for the Harris County District Attorney's office.

== Political career ==
=== Elections ===
Huffman easily won re-nomination to the state Senate in the Republican primary held on March 4, 2014. She defeated her only primary opponent, Derek A. Anthony, 32,962 (81.1 percent) to 7,691 (18.9 percent). She then won the general election on November 4, 2014, beating Democratic candidate Rita Lucido 113,817 (63.34%) to 60,934 (33.91%).

Huffman won reelection on November 6, 2018, when she defeated her Democratic challenger, Rita Lucido, who had also been her 2014 opponent. Huffman polled 157,910 votes (51.5 percent) to Lucido's 143,465 (46.8 percent). Lucido drew nearly 83,000 more votes in 2018 than she had in 2014. Another 5,380 ballots (1.8 percent) went to the 2018 Libertarian Party choice, Lauren LaCount.

=== Tenure ===
In January 2022, Huffman was named by Texas' Lt. Gov. as chairwoman of the Senate Finance Committee. She was previously the chair of the State Affairs Committee, Vice Chairwoman of the Senate Committee on Criminal Justice, and a member of the Legislative Budget Board.

She was characterized in 2013 as "the worst" Texas Senator by Texas Monthly magazine. She was again included on the Texas Monthly list of worst Texas legislators in 2015, for, among other things, sponsoring an amendment to a bill that would "exclude from personal financial disclosure the holdings of legislators' spouses." Her husband, Keith Lawyer, a Houston nightclub owner, had loaned Huffman $500,000 for the 2008 campaign.

In March 2015, Huffman proposed greater protection against libel for journalists who report whistleblower claims which turn out to have been false but which the reporters believed accurate at the time of media release. Huffman's plan died in her State Affairs Committee.

In 2021, Huffman was credited by The Guardian with having created heavily pro-Republican gerrymandered redistricting maps. The maps vastly expanded the number of safe Republican districts, while failing to add districts where non-whites were a majority despite the fact that 90% of the population growth in Texas was non-white. Huffman stated "we drew these maps race blind. We have not looked at any racial data as we drew these maps, and to this day I have not looked at any racial data," which advocates for minority voters described as rendering them politically invisible. In 2025, she testified in a case brought against the maps affirming they were drawn race blind; however when Greg Abbott called a special session in July to redraw the maps and address the U.S. Department of Justice's concern of racial gerrymandering, plaintiffs filed an emergency motion to reopen testimony and accused Huffman of providing false testimony that is inconsistent with the state’s new stance on the maps.

Texas Senate
Preceded by Kirk Watson	President pro tempore of the Texas Senate; 2019–2021	Succeeded by Brian Birdwell
