= 51st Texas Legislature =

The 51st Texas Legislature met from January 11, 1949, to July 6, 1949. All members present during this session were elected in the 1948 general elections.

== Sessions ==
Regular Session: January 11, 1949 - July 6, 1949

== Party summary ==
=== Senate ===
Affiliation	Members	Note
Democratic Party	31	
Total	31	

=== House ===
Affiliation	Members	Note
Democratic Party	150	
Total	150	

== Officers ==
=== Senate ===
- Lieutenant Governor: Allan Shivers (D) until September 1, 1949. Upon the death of Governor Beauford H. Jester, he became Governor and the Office of Lieutenant Governor was vacant.
- President Pro Tempore: Kyle Vick (D)

George C. Morris (D)
Grady Hazlewood (D)
Wardlow W. Lane (D)

=== House ===
- Speaker of the House: Durwood Manford (D)

== Members ==
=== Senate ===
Dist. 1

- Howard A. Carney (D), Atlanta

Dist. 2

- Wardlow Lane (D), Center

Dist. 3

- Ottis E. Lock (D), Lufkin

Dist. 4

- W. R. Cousins, Jr. (D), Beaumont

Dist. 5

- Mrs. Neveille H. Colson (D), Navasota

Dist. 6

- James E. Taylor (D), Kerens

Dist. 7

- Warren McDonald (D), Tyler

Dist. 8

- A. Aiken, Jr. (D), Paris

Dist. 9

- Charles R. Jones (D), Bonham

Dist. 10

- G. C. Morris (D), Greenville

Dist. 11

- Fred Harris (D), Dallas

Dist. 12

- Crawford Martin (D), Hillsboro

Dist. 13

- Kyle Vick (D), Waco

Dist. 14

- William T. "Bill" Moore (D), Bryan

Dist. 15

- Gus J. Strauss (D), Hallettsville

Dist. 16

- Searcy Bracewell (D), Houston

Dist. 17

- Jimmy Phillips (D), Angleton

Dist. 18

- John J. Bell (D), Cuero

Dist. 19

- R. A. Weinert (D), Seguin

Dist. 20

- Carlos Ashley (D), Llano

Dist. 21

- W. A. Shofner (D), Temple

Dist. 22

- R. L. Proffer (D), Justin

Dist. 23

- George Moffett (D), Chillicothe

Dist. 24

- Pat Bullock (D), Colorado City

Dist. 25

- Dorsey B. Hardeman (D), San Angelo

Dist. 26

- Walter Tynan (D), San Antonio

Dist. 27

- Rogers Kelly (D), Edinburg

Dist. 28

- Keith Kelly (D), Fort Worth

Dist. 29

- Hill D. Hudson (D), Pecos

Dist. 30

- Kilmer B. Corbin (D), Lamesa

Dist. 31

- Grady Hazlewood (D), Amarillo

=== House ===
The House was composed of 150 Democrats.

House members included future Governors Preston Smith and Dolph Briscoe, and future Congressmen Jack Brooks, Bob Casey, Abraham Kazen and J.T. Rutherford.

== Sources ==
- Texas Almanac and State Industrial Guide, 1949-51. A.H. Belo Corporation, Dallas, Texas.
