= 53rd Texas Legislature =

The 53rd Texas Legislature met from January 13, 1953, to May 27, 1953, and March 15, 1954, to April 13, 1954. All members present during this session were elected in the 1952 general elections.

== Sessions ==
Regular Session: January 13, 1953 – May 27, 1953

Called Session: March 15, 1954 – April 13, 1954

== Party summary ==
=== Senate ===
Affiliation	Members	Note
Democratic Party	31	
Total	31	

=== House ===
Affiliation	Members	Note
Democratic Party	149	
Independent	1	
Total	150	

== Officers ==
=== Senate ===
- Lieutenant Governor: Ben Ramsey (D)
- President Pro Tempore: Rogers Kelley (D)
  Jimmy Phillips (D)
  Gus J. Strauss (D)
  Dorsey B. Hardeman (D)

=== House ===
- Speaker of the House: Reuben Senterfitt (D)

== Members ==
=== Senate ===
Dist. 1

- Howard A. Carney (D), Atlanta

Dist. 2

- Wardlow Lane (D), Center

Dist. 3

- Ottis E. Lock (D), Lufkin

Dist. 4

- Jep Fuller (D), Port Arthur

Dist. 5

- Mrs. Neveille H. Colson (D), Navasota

Dist. 6

- James E. Taylor (D), Kerens

Dist. 7

- Warren McDonald (D), Tyler

Dist. 8

- George M. Parkhouse (D), Dallas

Dist. 9

- Joe Carter (D), Sherman

Dist. 10

- Doyle Willis (D), Fort Worth

Dist. 11

- William T. "Bill" Moore (D), Bryan

Dist. 12

- Crawford Martin (D), Hillsboro

Dist. 13

- Jarrard Secrest (D), Temple

Dist. 14

- Johnnie B. Rogers (D), Austin

Dist. 15

- Gus J. Strauss (D), Hallettsville

Dist. 16

- Searcy Bracewell (D), Houston

Dist. 17

- Jimmy Phillips (D), Angleton

Dist. 18

- John J. Bell (D), Cuero

Dist. 19

- Rudolph A. Weinert (D), Seguin

Dist. 20

- William H. Shireman (D), Corpus Christi

Dist. 21

- Abraham Kazen (D), Laredo

Dist. 22

- Wayne Wagonseller (D), Stoneburg

Dist. 23

- George Moffett (D), Chillicothe

Dist. 24

- Harley Sadler (D), Abilene

Dist. 25

- Dorsey B. Hardeman (D), San Angelo

Dist. 26

- Oswald Latimer (D), San Antonio

Dist. 27

- Rogers Kelly (D), Edinburg

Dist. 28

- Keith Kelly (D), Fort Worth

Dist. 29

- James T. Rutherford (D), Odessa

Dist. 30

- Andrew J. "Andy" Rogers (D), Childress

Dist. 31

- Grady Hazlewood (D), Amarillo

=== House ===
The House was composed of 150 Democrats. House members included future Governor Dolph Briscoe, future federal judge Barefoot Sanders and future Congressmen Kika de la Garza, Joe Kilgore, and Joe Pool, as well as future Texas Attorney General Waggoner Carr, and future Texas Agriculture Commissioner Jack Hightower.

== Sources ==
- Legislative Reference Library of Texas,
