= 58th Texas Legislature =

The 58th Texas Legislature met from January 8, 1963, to May 24, 1963. All members present during this session were elected in the 1962 general elections.

== Sessions ==
Regular Session: January 8, 1963 - May 24, 1963

== Party summary ==
=== Senate ===
Affiliation	Members	Note
Democratic Party	31	
Total	31	

=== House ===
Affiliation	Members	Note
Democratic Party	140	
Republican Party	10	
Total	150	

== Officers ==
=== Senate ===
- Lieutenant Governor: Preston Smith (D)
- President Pro Tempore: Martin Dies, Jr. (D)

=== House ===
- Speaker of the House: Byron Tunnell (D)

== Members ==
=== Senate ===
Dist. 1

- A.M. Aikin, Jr. (D), Paris

Dist. 2

- Jack Strong (D), Longview

Dist. 3

- Martin Dies, Jr. (D), Lufkin

Dist. 4

- D. Roy Harrington (D), Port Arthur

Dist. 5

- Neveille Colson (D), Navasota

Dist. 6

- Criss Cole (D), Houston

Dist. 7

- Galloway Calhoun (D), Tyler

Dist. 8

- George Parkhouse (D), Dallas

Dist. 9

- Ralph Hall (D), Rockwall

Dist. 10

- Don Kennard (D), Fort Worth

Dist. 11

- William T. "Bill" Moore (D), Bryan

Dist. 12

- J.P. Word (D), Meridian

Dist. 13

- Murray Watson, Jr. (D), Waco

Dist. 14

- Charles F. Herring (D), Austin

Dist. 15

- Culp Krueger (D), El Campo

Dist. 16

- Louis Crump (D), San Saba

Dist. 17

- A.R. "Babe" Schwartz (D), Galveston

Dist. 18

- W.N. "Bill" Patman (D), Ganado

Dist. 19

- Walter Richter (D), Gonzales

Dist. 20

- Bruce Reagan (D), Corpus Christi

Dist. 21

- Abraham Kazen (D), Laredo

Dist. 22

- Tom Creighton (D), Mineral Wells

Dist. 23

- George Moffett (D), Chillicothe

Dist. 24

- David Ratliff (D), Stamford

Dist. 25

- Dorsey B. Hardeman (D), San Angelo

Dist. 26

- Franklin Spears (D), San Antonio

Dist. 27

- James Bates (D), Edinburg

Dist. 28

- H.J. "Doc" Blanchard (D), Lubbock

Dist. 29

- Frank Owen (D), Midland

Dist. 30

- Andrew J. Rogers (D), Childress

Dist. 31

- Grady Hazlewood (D), Amarillo
