= 61st Texas Legislature =

The 61st Texas Legislature met in 1969 in a regular session from January 14 to June 2 and in two consecutive special sessions from July 28 to August 26 and from August 27 to September 9. All members present during this session were elected in the 1968 general elections.

== Party summary ==
=== Senate ===
Affiliation	Members	Note
Democratic Party	29	
Republican Party	2	
Total	31	

=== House ===
Affiliation	Members	Note
Democratic Party	141	
Republican Party	8	
Independent	1	
Total	150	

== Officers ==
=== Senate ===
- Lieutenant Governor: Ben Barnes, Democrat
- President Pro Tempore (regular session): Don C. Kennard, Democrat
- President Pro Tempore (1st called session): Horace J. Blanchard, Democrat
- President Pro Tempore (2nd called session): James P. Word, Democrat

=== House ===
- Speaker of the House: Gus Mutscher, Democrat

== Members ==
=== Senate ===
Dist. 1

- A. M. Aikin Jr. (D), Paris

Dist. 2

- Jack Strong (D), Longview

Dist. 3

- Charlie Wilson (D), Lufkin

Dist. 4

- D. Roy Harrington (D), Port Arthur

Dist. 5

- William T. Moore (D), Bryan

Dist. 6

- Criss Cole (D), Houston

Dist. 7

- Chet Brooks (D), Pasadena

Dist. 8

- O. H. Harris (R), Dallas

Dist. 9

- Ralph Hall (D), Rockwall

Dist. 10

- Don Kennard (D), Fort Worth

Dist. 11

- Barbara Jordan (D), Houston

Dist. 12

- J. P. Word (D), Meridian

Dist. 13

- Murray Watson Jr. (D), Waco

Dist. 14

- Charles F. Herring (D), Austin

Dist. 15

- Henry Grover (R), Houston

Dist. 16

- Mike McKool (D), Dallas

Dist. 17

- A. R. Schwartz (D), Galveston

Dist. 18

- Bill Patman (D), Ganado

Dist. 19

- V. E. Berry (D), San Antonio

Dist. 20

- Ronald W. Bridges (D), Corpus Christi

Dist. 21

- Wayne Connally (D), Floresville

Dist. 22

- Tom Creighton (D), Mineral Wells

Dist. 23

- Oscar Mauzy (D), Dallas

Dist. 24

- David Ratliff (D), Stamford

Dist. 25

- W. E. Snelson (D), Midland

Dist. 26

- Joe J. Bernal (D), San Antonio

Dist. 27

- James Bates (D), Edinburg

Dist. 28

- H. J. Blanchard (D), Lubbock

Dist. 29

- Joe Christie (D), El Paso

Dist. 30

- Jack Hightower (D), Vernon

Dist. 31

- Grady Hazlewood (D), Canyon

=== House ===
Dist. 1

- Ed Howard (D)
