= 50th Texas Legislature =

The 50th Texas Legislature met from January 14, 1947, to June 6, 1947. All members present during this session were elected in the 1946 general elections, except for Senator Maribelle Stewart of Houston who succeeded her husband, who died in office, in a special election in 1947.

== Sessions ==
Regular Session: January 14, 1947 - June 6, 1947

== Party summary ==
=== Senate ===
| Affiliation | Members | Note |
|---|---|---|
| Democratic Party | 31 | |
| Total | 31 | |

=== House ===
| Affiliation | Members | Note |
|---|---|---|
| Democratic Party | 150 | |
| Total | 150 | |

== Officers ==
=== Senate ===
- Lieutenant Governor: Allan Shivers (D)
- President Pro Tempore: Ben Ramsey (D), T. C. Chadick (D)

=== House ===
- Speaker of the House: William O. Reed (D)

== Members ==
=== Senate ===
Dist. 1

- Howard A. Carney (D), Atlanta

Dist. 2

- Wardlow Lane (D), Center

Dist. 3

- Ben Ramsey (D), San Augustine

Dist. 4

- W. R. Cousins, Jr. (D), Beaumont

Dist. 5

- Roger A. Knight (D), Madisonville

Dist. 6

- James E. Taylor (D), Kerens

Dist. 7

- T. C. Chadick (D), Quitman

Dist. 8

- A. M. Aiken, Jr. (D), Paris

Dist. 9

- Charles R. Jones (D), Bonham

Dist. 10

- G. C. Morris (D), Greenville

Dist. 11

- Fred Harris (D), Dallas

Dist. 12

- A. B. Crawford (D), Granbury

Dist. 13

- Kyle Vick (D), Waco

Dist. 14

- Joseph Alton York (D), Bryan

Dist. 15

- Gus J. Strauss (D), Hallettsville

Dist. 16

- W. Lacey Stewart (D), Houston succeeded by
- Maribelle Stewart (D), Houston

Dist. 17

- Jimmy Phillips (D), Angleton

Dist. 18

- Fred Mauritz (D), Ganado

Dist. 19

- Rudolph A. Weinert (D), Seguin

Dist. 20

- James A. Stanford (D), Austin

Dist. 21

- Buster Brown (D), Temple

Dist. 22

- R. L. Proffer (D), Justin

Dist. 23

- George Moffett (D), Chillicothe

Dist. 24

- Pat Bullock (D), Colorado City

Dist. 25

- Dorsey B. Hardeman (D), San Angelo

Dist. 26

- Walter Tynan (D), San Antonio

Dist. 27

- Rogers Kelly (D), Edinburg

Dist. 28

- Keith Kelly (D), Fort Worth

Dist. 29

- Henry L. Winfield (D), Fort Stockton

Dist. 30

- Sterling J. Parrish (D), Lubbock

Dist. 31

- Grady Hazlewood (D), Amarillo

=== House ===
The House was composed of 150 Democrats.

House members included future Governors Preston Smith and future Congressmen Jack Brooks, Abraham Kazen and J.T. Rutherford and future U.S. House Speaker Jim Wright.
