= 62nd Texas Legislature =

The 62nd Texas Legislature met from January 12, 1971, to May 31, 1971 in regular session, and again in four more special called sessions (see below). All members present during this session were elected in the 1970 general elections.

== Sessions ==
- Regular session: January 12, 1971 – May 31, 1971
- 1st called session: June 1, 1971 – June 4, 1971
- 2nd called session: March 28, 1972 – March 30, 1972
- 3rd called session: June 14, 1972 – July 7, 1972
- 4th called session: September 18, 1972 – October 17, 1972

== Party summary ==
=== Senate ===
Affiliation	Members	Note
Democratic Party	29	
Republican Party	2	
Total	31	

=== House ===
Affiliation	Members	Note
Democratic Party	139	
Republican Party	10	
Total	149	

== Officers ==
=== Senate ===
- Lieutenant Governor: Ben Barnes, Democrat
- President Pro Tempore (regular session): Jack Hightower, Democrat
- President Pro Tempore (1st called session): Wallace E. "Pete" Snelson, Democrat
- President Pro Tempore (2nd called session): Barbara Jordan, Democrat
- President Pro Tempore (3rd called session): Chet Brooks, Democrat
- President Pro Tempore (4th called session): Wayne Connally, Democrat

=== House ===
- Speaker of the House: Gus Mutscher, Democrat. Mutscher served as Speaker of the House until the second called session of the Sixty-second Texas Legislature beginning on March 28, 1972, at which time he resigned as Speaker and Rayford Price was elected Speaker of the House and served until the end of the Sixty-second Texas Legislature.

== Members ==
=== Senate ===
Dist. 1

- A. M. Aikin Jr. (D), Paris

Dist. 2

- Lindley Beckworth (D), Longview

Dist. 3

- Charlie Wilson (D), Lufkin

Dist. 4

- D. Roy Harrington (D), Port Arthur

Dist. 5

- William T. Moore (D), Bryan

Dist. 6

- Jim Wallace (D), Houston

Dist. 7

- Chet Brooks (D), Pasadena

Dist. 8

- O. H. Harris (R), Dallas

Dist. 9

- Ralph Hall (D), Rockwall

Dist. 10

- Don Kennard (D), Fort Worth

Dist. 11

- Barbara Jordan (D), Houston

Dist. 12

- J. P. Word (D), Meridian

Dist. 13

- Murray Watson Jr. (D), Waco

Dist. 14

- Charles F. Herring (D), Austin

Dist. 15

- Henry Grover (R), Houston

Dist. 16

- Mike McKool (D), Dallas

Dist. 17

- A. R. Schwartz (D), Galveston

Dist. 18

- Bill Patman (D), Ganado

Dist. 19

- Glenn Kothmann (D), San Antonio

Dist. 20

- Ronald W. Bridges (D), Corpus Christi

Dist. 21

- Wayne Connally (D), Floresville

Dist. 22

- Tom Creighton (D), Mineral Wells

Dist. 23

- Oscar Mauzy (D), Dallas

Dist. 24

- David Ratliff (D), Stamford

Dist. 25

- W. E. Snelson (D), Midland

Dist. 26

- Joe J. Bernal (D), San Antonio

Dist. 27

- James Bates (D), Edinburg

Dist. 28

- H. J. Blanchard (D), Lubbock

Dist. 29

- Joe Christie (D), El Paso

Dist. 30

- Jack Hightower (D), Vernon

Dist. 31

- Max Sherman (D), Amarillo

== Legislative actions ==
The Legislature established the Texas Property and Casualty Insurance Guaranty Association.
