= 64th Texas Legislature =

The 64th Texas Legislature met from January 14, 1975, to June 2, 1975. All members present during this session were elected in the 1974 general elections.

== Sessions ==
Regular Session: January 14, 1975 - June 2, 1975

== Party summary ==
=== Senate ===
Affiliation	Members	Note
Democratic Party	28	
Republican Party	3	
Total	31	

=== House ===
Affiliation	Members	Note
Democratic Party	132	
Republican Party	18	
Total	150	

== Officers ==
=== Senate ===
- Lieutenant Governor: William P. Hobby, Jr., Democrat
- President Pro Tempore: Glenn Kothmann, Democrat

=== House ===
- Speaker of the House: Bill Wayne Clayton, Democrat

== Members ==
=== Senate ===
Dist. 1

- A.M. Aikin, Jr. (D), Paris

Dist. 2

- Peyton McKnight (D), Tyler

Dist. 3

- Don Adams (D), Jasper

Dist. 4

- D. Roy Harrington (D), Port Arthur

Dist. 5

- William T. "Bill" Moore (D), Bryan

Dist. 6

- Lindon Williams (D), Houston

Dist. 7

- Bob Gammage (D), Houston

Dist. 8

- O.H. "Ike" Harris (R), Dallas

Dist. 9

- Ron Clower (D), Garland

Dist. 10

- Bill Meier (D), Euless

Dist. 11

- Chet Brooks (D), Houston

Dist. 12

- Betty Andujar (R), Fort Worth

Dist. 13

- Walter Mengden (R), Waco

Dist. 14

- Lloyd Doggett (D), Austin

Dist. 15

- Jack Ogg (D), Houston

Dist. 16

- Bill Braecklein (D), Dallas

Dist. 17

- A.R. "Babe" Schwartz (D), Galveston

Dist. 18

- W.N. "Bill" Patman (D), Ganado

Dist. 19

- Glenn Kothmann (D), San Antonio

Dist. 20

- Mike McKinnon (D), Corpus Christi

Dist. 21

- John Traeger (D), Seguin

Dist. 22

- Tom Creighton (D), Mineral Wells

Dist. 23

- Oscar Mauzy (D), Dallas

Dist. 24

- Grant Jones (D), Abilene

Dist. 25

- W. E. "Pete" Snelson (D), Midland

Dist. 26

- Frank Lombardino (D), San Antonio

Dist. 27

- Raul Longoria (D), Edinburg

Dist. 28

- Kent Hance (D), Lubbock

Dist. 29

- Tati Santiesteban (D), El Paso

Dist. 30

- Ray Farabee (D), Wichita Falls

Dist. 31

- Max Sherman (D), Amarillo
