= 65th Texas Legislature =

The 65th Texas Legislature met from January 11, 1977, to May 30, 1977, in regular session, and again in two special called sessions (see below). All members present during this session were elected in the 1976 general elections.

== Filibuster ==
In May, Bill Meier of Fort Worth, Texas set the national record for the longest filibuster at 43 hours to try to stop a bill that would have made workers' compensation claims from industrial accidents not subject to the state's public information act.

== Sessions ==
Regular session: January 11, 1977 – May 30, 1977
1st called session: July 11, 1977 – July 21, 1977
2nd called session: July 10, 1978 – August 8, 1978

== Party summary ==
=== Senate ===
Affiliation	Members	Note
Democratic Party	28	
Republican Party	3	
Total	31	

=== House ===
Affiliation	Members	Note
Democratic Party	131	
Republican Party	19	
Total	150	

== Officers ==
=== Senate ===
- Lieutenant Governor: William P. Hobby Jr., Democrat
- President Pro Tempore (regular session): Betty Andujar, Republican
- President Pro Tempore (called session): Peyton McKnight, Democrat

=== House ===
- Speaker of the House: Bill Wayne Clayton, Democrat

== Members ==
=== Senate ===
Dist. 1

- A. M. Aikin Jr. (D), Paris

Dist. 2

- Peyton McKnight (D), Tyler

Dist. 3

- Don Adams (D), Jasper

Dist. 4

- Carl A. Parker (D), Port Arthur

Dist. 5

- William T. "Bill" Moore (D), Bryan

Dist. 6

- Lindon Williams (D), Houston

Dist. 7

- Gene Jones (D), Houston

Dist. 8

- Orland Harris (R), Dallas

Dist. 9

- Ron Clower (D), Garland

Dist. 10

- Bill Meier (D), Euless

Dist. 11

- Chet Brooks (D), Houston

Dist. 12

- Betty Andujar (R), Fort Worth

Dist. 13

- Walter Mengden (R), Waco

Dist. 14

- Lloyd Doggett (D), Austin

Dist. 15

- Jack Ogg (D), Houston

Dist. 16

- Bill Braecklein (D), Dallas

Dist. 17

- A. R. "Babe" Schwartz (D), Galveston

Dist. 18

- W. N. "Bill" Patman (D), Ganado

Dist. 19

- Glenn Kothmann (D), San Antonio

Dist. 20

- Carlos F. Truan (D), Corpus Christi

Dist. 21

- John Traeger (D), Seguin

Dist. 22

- Tom Creighton (D), Mineral Wells

Dist. 23

- Oscar Mauzy (D), Dallas

Dist. 24

- Grant Jones (D), Abilene

Dist. 25

- W. E. "Pete" Snelson (D), Midland

Dist. 26

- Frank Lombardino (D), San Antonio

Dist. 27

- Raul Longoria (D), Edinburg

Dist. 28

- Kent Hance (D), Lubbock

Dist. 29

- Tati Santiesteban (D), El Paso

Dist. 30

- Ray Farabee (D), Wichita Falls

Dist. 31

- Max Sherman (D), Amarillo
