= 66th Texas Legislature =

The 66th Texas Legislature met from January 9, 1979, to May 28, 1979. All members present during this session were elected in the 1978 general elections.

== Sessions ==
Regular Session: January 9, 1979 - May 28, 1979

== Party summary ==
=== Senate ===
| Affiliation | Members | Note |
|---|---|---|
| Democratic Party | 27 | |
| Republican Party | 4 | |
| Total | 31 | |

=== House ===
| Affiliation | Members | Note |
|---|---|---|
| Democratic Party | 127 | |
| Republican Party | 23 | |
| Total | 150 | |

== Officers ==
=== Senate ===
- Lieutenant Governor: William P. Hobby, Jr., Democrat
- President Pro Tempore: Bill Meier, Democrat

=== House ===
- Speaker of the House: Bill Wayne Clayton, Democrat

== Members ==
=== Senate ===
Dist. 1

- Ed Howard (D), Texarkana

Dist. 2

- Peyton McKnight (D), Tyler

Dist. 3

- Don Adams (D), Jasper

Dist. 4

- Carl A. Parker (D), Port Arthur

Dist. 5

- W. T. "Bill" Moore (D), Bryan

Dist. 6

- Lindon Williams (D), Houston

Dist. 7

- Gene Jones (D), Houston

Dist. 8

- O.H. "Ike" Harris (R), Dallas

Dist. 9

- Ron Clower (D), Garland

Dist. 10

- Bill Meier (D), Euless

Dist. 11

- Chet Brooks (D), Houston

Dist. 12

- Betty Andujar (R), Fort Worth

Dist. 13

- Walter Mengden (R), Waco

Dist. 14

- Lloyd Doggett (D), Austin

Dist. 15

- Jack Ogg (D), Houston

Dist. 16

- Bill Braecklein (D), Dallas

Dist. 17

- A.R. "Babe" Schwartz (D), Galveston

Dist. 18

- W.N. "Bill" Patman (D), Ganado

Dist. 19

- Glenn Kothmann (D), San Antonio

Dist. 20

- Carlos F. Truan (D), Corpus Christi

Dist. 21

- John Traeger (D), Seguin

Dist. 22

- Tom Creighton (D), Mineral Wells

Dist. 23

- Oscar Mauzy (D), Dallas

Dist. 24

- Grant Jones (D), Abilene

Dist. 25

- W. E. "Pete" Snelson (D), Midland

Dist. 26

- R.L. "Bob" Vale (D), San Antonio

Dist. 27

- Raul Longoria (D), Edinburg

Dist. 28

- E L Short (D), Tahoka

Dist. 29

- Tati Santiesteban (D), El Paso

Dist. 30

- Ray Farabee (D), Wichita Falls

Dist. 31

- Bob Price (R), Amarillo
