= 71st Texas Legislature =

The 71st Texas Legislature met from January 10, 1989, to May 29, 1989, and in six subsequent special called sessions (see below). All members present during this session were elected in the 1988 general elections.

== Sessions ==
Regular Session: January 10, 1989 – May 29, 1989

1st Called Session: June 20, 1989 – July 18, 1989

2nd Called Session: November 14, 1989 – December 12, 1989

3rd Called Session: February 27, 1990 – March 28, 1990

4th Called Session: April 2, 1990 – May 1, 1990

5th Called Session: May 2, 1990 – May 30, 1990

6th Called Session: June 4, 1990 – June 7, 1990

== Party summary ==
=== Senate ===
Affiliation	Members	Note
Democratic Party	23	
Republican Party	8	
Total	31	

=== House of Representatives ===
Affiliation	Members	Note
Democratic Party	91	
Republican Party	59	
Total	150	

== Officers ==
=== Senate ===
- Lieutenant Governor: William P. Hobby, Jr., Democrat
- President Pro Tempore (regular session): John N. Leedom, Republican
- President Pro Tempore (1st called session): J. E. "Buster" Brown, Republican
- President Pro Tempore (2nd called session): Kent A. Caperton, Democrat
- President Pro Tempore (3rd called session): Hugh Parmer, Democrat
- President Pro Tempore (4th-6th called sessions): Bob McFarland, Republican

=== House ===
- Speaker of the House: Gibson D. "Gib" Lewis, Democrat

== Members ==
=== Senate ===
Senator	Party	District	Home Town	Took office
Bill Ratliff	Republican	1	Mount Pleasant	1989
Ted Lyon	Democratic	2	Mesquite	1991
Bill Haley	Democratic	3	Center	1991
Carl A. Parker	Democratic	4	Port Arthur	1977
Kent A. Caperton	Democratic	5	Bryan	1981
Gene Green	Democratic	6	Houston	1987
Don Henderson	Republican	7	Houston	1991
O.H. "Ike" Harris	Republican	8	Dallas	1967
Chet Edwards	Democratic	9	Duncanville	1983
Chris Harris	Republican	10	Arlington	1991
Chet Brooks	Democratic	11	Pasadena	1967
Hugh Parmer	Democratic	12	Fort Worth	1983
Craig A. Washington	Democratic	13	Houston	1983
Gonzalo Barrientos	Democratic	14	Austin	1985
John Whitmire	Democratic	15	Houston	1983
John N. Leedom	Republican	16	Dallas	1981
J. E. "Buster" Brown	Republican	17	Lake Jackson	1981
Ken Armbrister	Democratic	18	Victoria	1987
Frank Tejeda	Democratic	19	San Antonio	1987
Carlos F. Truan	Democratic	20	Corpus Christi	1977
Judith Zaffirini	Democratic	21	Laredo	1987
Bob Glasgow	Democratic	22	Stephenville	1980
Eddie Bernice Johnson	Democratic	23	Dallas	1987
Robert Temple Dickson III	Democratic	24	San Antonio	1989
Bill Sims	Democratic	25	San Antonio	1983
Cyndi Taylor Krier	Republican	26	San Antonio	1985
Hector Uribe	Democratic	27	Brownsville	1981
John Montford	Democratic	28	Lubbock	1982
H. Tati Santiesteban	Democratic	29	El Paso	1973
Steve Carriker	Democratic	30	Roby	1988
Teel Bivins	Republican	31	Amarillo	1989

== Sources ==
http://www.tsl.state.tx.us/ref/abouttx/holidays.html

http://www.lrl.state.tx.us/scanned/sessionOverviews/summary/soe70.pdf
