= 77th Texas Legislature =

The 77th Texas Legislature met from January 9, 2001 to May 28, 2001, following the 2000 general election.

== Sessions ==
Regular Session: January 9, 2001 - May 28, 2001

== Party summary ==
=== Senate ===
Affiliation	Members	Note
Republican Party	16	
Democratic Party	15	
Total	31	

=== House ===
Affiliation	Members	Note
Democratic Party	78	
Republican Party	72	
Total	150	

== Officers ==
=== Senate ===
- Lieutenant Governor: Bill Ratliff (acting), Republican
- President Pro Tempore: Chris Harris, Republican

=== House ===
- Speaker of the House: Pete Laney, Democrat
