= 46th Texas Legislature =

The 46th Texas Legislature met from January 10, 1939, to June 21, 1939. All members present during this session were elected in the 1938 general elections.

== Sessions ==
Regular Session: January 10, 1939 – June 21, 1939

== Party summary ==
=== Senate ===
Affiliation	Members	Note
Democratic Party	31	
Total	31	

=== House ===
Affiliation	Members	Note
Democratic Party	150	
Total	150	

== Officers ==
=== Senate ===
- Lieutenant Governor: Coke R. Stevenson (D)
- President Pro Tempore: Weaver Moore (D)

=== House ===
- Speaker of the House: Robert Emmett Morse (D)

== Members ==
=== Senate ===
Dist. 1

- E. Harold Beck (D), Texarkana

Dist. 2

- Joe Hill (D), Henderson

Dist. 3

- John S. Redditt (D), Lufkin

Dist. 4

- Allan Shivers (D), Port Arthur

Dist. 5

- Gordon Burns (D), Huntsville

Dist. 6

- Clay Cotten (D), Palestine

Dist. 7

- Will D. Pace (D), Tyler

Dist. 8

- A. M. Aiken Jr. (D), Paris

Dist. 9

- Olin Van Zandt (D), Tioga

Dist. 10

- Claude Isbell (D), Rockwall

Dist. 11

- William Graves (D), Dallas

Dist. 12

- Vernon Lemmons (D), Waxahachie

Dist. 13

- Doss Hardin (D), Waco

Dist. 14

- Albert Stone (D), Brenham

Dist. 15

- Louis Sulak (D), La Grange

Dist. 16

- Weaver Moore (D), Houston

Dist. 17

- William Stone (D), Galveston

Dist. 18

- Morris Roberts (D), Pettus

Dist. 19

- Rudolph A. Weinert (D), Seguin

Dist. 20

- Houghton Brownlee (D), Austin

Dist. 21

- James Manley Head (D), Stephenville

Dist. 22

- Royston Lanning (D), Jacksboro

Dist. 23

- George Moffett (D), Chillicothe

Dist. 24

- Wilbourne Collie (D), Eastland

Dist. 25

- Penrose Metcalfe (D), San Angelo

Dist. 26

- J. Franklin Spears (D), San Antonio

Dist. 27

- Rogers Kelly (D), Edinburg

Dist. 28

- Jesse Martin (D), Fort Worth

Dist. 29

- Henry L. Winfield (D), Fort Stockton

Dist. 30

- G. Hobert Nelson (D), Lubbock

Dist. 31

- C.C. Small (D), Amarillo

=== House ===
The House was composed of 150 Democrats.

House members included future Governor Price Daniel and future U.S. Representative Homer Thornberry.

== Sources ==
- Legislative Reference Library of Texas
