= 47th Texas Legislature =

The 47th Texas Legislature met from January 14, 1941, to July 3, 1941, and in special session from September 9 to September 19, 1941. All members present during this session were elected in the 1940 general elections.

== Sessions ==
Regular session: January 14, 1941 - July 3, 1941

1st called session: September 9, 1941 - September 19, 1941

== Party summary ==
=== Senate ===
Affiliation	Members	Note
Democratic Party	31	
Total	31	

=== House ===
Affiliation	Members	Note
Democratic Party	150	
Total	150	

== Officers ==
=== Senate ===
- Lieutenant governor: Coke R. Stevenson (D) until he became governor on August 4, 1941, upon the resignation of Governor W. Lee "Pappy" O'Daniel who was elected to the U.S. Senate. After that, the post was vacant until 1943.
- President pro tempore: Clay Cotten (D), Rudolph A. Weinert (D), E. Harold Beck (D), Henry L. Winfield (D)

=== House ===
- Speaker of the House: Homer Lakerby Leonard (D)

== Members ==
=== Senate ===
Dist. 1

- E. Harold Beck (D), Texarkana

Dist. 2

- Joe Hill (D), Henderson

Dist. 3

- Ben Ramsey (D), San Augustine

Dist. 4

- Allan Shivers (D), Port Arthur

Dist. 5

- Clement Fain (D), Livingston

Dist. 6

- Clay Cotten (D), Palestine

Dist. 7

- T. C. Chadick (D), Quitman

Dist. 8

- A. M. Aiken, Jr. (D), Paris

Dist. 9

- Olin Van Zandt (D), Tioga

Dist. 10

- Claude Isbell (D), Rockwall

Dist. 11

- William Graves (D), Dallas

Dist. 12

- Vernon Lemmons (D), Waxahachie

Dist. 13

- Kyle Vick (D), Waco

Dist. 14

- Joseph Alton York (D), Bryan

Dist. 15

- Louis Sulak (D), La Grange

Dist. 16

- Weaver Moore (D), Houston

Dist. 17

- William Stone (D), Galveston

Dist. 18

- Fred Mauritz (D), Ganado

Dist. 19

- Rudolph A. Weinert (D), Seguin

Dist. 20

- Houghton Brownlee (D), Austin

Dist. 21

- Karl Lovelady (D), Meridian

Dist. 22

- Royston Lanning (D), Jacksboro

Dist. 23

- George Moffett (D), Chillicothe

Dist. 24

- John Lee Smith (D), Throckmorton

Dist. 25

- Penrose Metcalfe (D), San Angelo

Dist. 26

- J. Franklin Spears (D), San Antonio

Dist. 27

- Rogers Kelly (D), Edinburg

Dist. 28

- Jesse Martin (D), Fort Worth

Dist. 29

- Henry L. Winfield (D), Fort Stockton

Dist. 30

- Marshall Formby (D), McAdoo

Dist. 31

- Grady Hazlewood (D), Amarillo

=== House ===
The House was composed of 150 Democrats.

House members included future Governor Price Daniel.
