= 75th Texas Legislature =

The 75th Texas Legislature met from January 14, 1997 to June 2, 1997. All members present during this session were elected in the 1996 general elections. The Republicans won the Texas State Senate chamber for the first time since Reconstruction in the 1996 elections.

== Sessions ==
Regular Session: January 14, 1997 - June 2, 1997

== Party summary ==
=== Senate ===
Affiliation	Members	Note
Republican Party	17	
Democratic Party	14	
Total	31	

=== House ===
Affiliation	Members	Note
Democratic Party	82	
Republican Party	68	
Total	150	

== Officers ==
=== Senate ===
- Lieutenant Governor: Bob Bullock, Democrat
- President Pro Tempore: Judith Zaffirini, Democrat

=== House ===
- Speaker of the House: Pete Laney, Democrat

== Members ==
=== Senate ===
- Ken Armbrister
- Gonzalo Barrientos
- Teel Bivins
- J.E. 'Buster' Brown
- David Cain
- John Carona
- Robert Duncan
- Rodney Ellis
- Troy Fraser
- Mario Gallegos
- Michael Galloway
- Chris Harris
- Tom Haywood
- Jon Lindsay
- Eddie Lucio, Jr.
- Gregory Luna
- Frank Madla
- Mike Moncrief
- Jane Nelson
- Drew Nixon
- Steve Ogden
- Jerry Patterson
- Bill Ratliff
- Florence Shapiro
- Eliot Shapleigh
- David Sibley
- Carlos F. Truan
- Jeff Wentworth
- Royce West
- John Whitmire
- Judith Zaffirini

=== House ===
- Clyde Alexander
- Ray Allen
- Leo Alvarado, Jr.
- Kip Averitt
- Kevin Bailey
- Hugo Berlanga
- Dennis Bonnen
- Fred Bosse
- Kim Brimer
- Lon Burnam
- Bill Carter
- Norma Chavez
- Warren Chisum
- Wayne Christian
- Ron Clark
- Garnet Coleman
- Robert "Robby" Cook
- Frank Corte, Jr.
- David Counts
- Joe Crabb
- Tom Craddick
- Henry Cuellar
- John Culberson
- Debra Danburg
- Diana Davila
- Yvonne Davis
- Dianne White Delisi
- Mary Denny
- Joe Driver
- Dawnna Dukes
- Jim Dunnam
- Harold V. Dutton, Jr.
- Al Edwards
- Harryette Ehrhardt
- Craig Eiland
- Gary Elkins
- Jessica Farrar
- Charles Finnell
- Ismael "Kino" Flores
- Pete Gallego
- Carolyn Galloway
- Domingo Garcia
- Helen Giddings
- Bob Glaze
- Toby Goodman
- Tony Goolsby
- Patricia Gray
- Sherri Greenberg
- Kent Grusendorf
- Roberto Gutierrez
- Patrick "Pat" Haggerty
- Peggy Hamric
- Will Hartnett
- Judy Hawley
- Talmadge Heflin
- Christine Hernandez
- Allen Hightower
- Paul Hilbert
- Harvey Hilderbran
- Fred Hill
- Juan "Chuy" Hinojosa
- John Hirschi
- Scott Hochberg
- Terri Hodge
- Steve Holzheauser
- Jim Horn
- Charlie Howard
- Bob Hunter
- Suzanna Gratia Hupp
- Carl Isett
- Mike Jackson
- Kyle L. Janek
- Delwin Jones
- Jesse Jones
- Robert Junell
- Ted Kamel
- Terry Keel
- Jim Keffer
- Tracy O. King
- Mike Krusee
- Dan Kubiak
- Edmund Kuempel
- James E. "Pete" Laney
- Glenn Lewis
- Ron Lewis
- John Longoria
- Vilma Luna
- Jerry Madden
- Kenny Marchant
- Glen Maxey
- Brian McCall
- Ruth Jones McClendon
- Jim McReynolds
- Tommy Merritt
- Nancy Moffat
- Paul Moreno
- Anna Mowery
- Elliott Naishtat
- Joe Nixon
- Keith Oakley
- Steve Ogden
- René O. Oliveira
- Dora Olivo
- Sue Palmer
- Pete Patterson
- Joe C. Pickett
- Jim Pitts
- Allen Place
- Albert Price
- Robert Puente
- Bob Rabuck
- Tom Ramsay
- Irma Rangel
- Richard Peña Raymond
- Arthur "Art" Reyna
- Elvira Reyna
- Alec Rhodes
- Ciro Rodriguez
- Bill Roman
- Paul Sadler
- Gene Seaman
- Gilbert Serna
- John Shields
- Bill Siebert
- Todd Smith
- John Smithee
- Jim Solis
- Burt Solomons
- Todd Staples
- Mark Stiles
- David Swinford
- Robert Talton
- Barry Telford
- Senfronia Thompson
- Dale Tillery
- Gerard Torres
- Bob Turner
- Sylvester Turner
- D.R. 'Tom' Uher
- Leticia Van de Putte
- Gary Walker
- G.E. 'Buddy' West
- Tommy Williams
- Ric Williamson
- Ron Wilson
- Miguel "Mike" Wise
- Arlene Wohlgemuth
- Steven Wolens
- Beverly Woolley
- Ken Yarbrough
- Zeb Zbranek
