= 48th Texas Legislature =

The 48th Texas Legislature met from January 12, 1943, to May 11, 1943. All members present during this session were elected in the 1942 general elections.

== Sessions ==
Regular Session: January 12, 1945 – May 11, 1945

== Party summary ==
=== Senate ===
Affiliation	Members	Note
Democratic Party	31	
Total	31	

=== House ===
Affiliation	Members	Note
Democratic Party	150	
Total	150	

== Officers ==
=== Senate ===
- Lieutenant Governor: John Lee Smith (D)
- President Pro Tempore: Vernon Lemens (D), Fred Mauritz (D), A. M. Aikin Jr. (D)

=== House ===
- Speaker of the House: Price Daniel (D)

== Members ==
=== Senate ===
Dist. 1

- E. Harold Beck (D), Texarkana

Dist. 2

- Wardlow Lane (D), Center

Dist. 3

- Ben Ramsey (D), San Augustine

Dist. 4

- Allan Shivers (D), Port Arthur

Dist. 5

- Clement Fain (D), Livingston

Dist. 6

- Clay Cotten (D), Palestine

Dist. 7

- T. C. Chadick (D), Quitman

Dist. 8

- A. M. Aiken Jr. (D), Paris

Dist. 9

- Charles R. Jones (D), Bonham

Dist. 10

- G. C. Morris (D), Greenville

Dist. 11

- William Graves (D), Dallas

Dist. 12

- Vernon Lemmons (D), Waxahachie

Dist. 13

- Kyle Vick (D), Waco

Dist. 14

- Joseph Alton York (D), Bryan

Dist. 15

- Louis Sulak (D), La Grange

Dist. 16

- Weaver Moore (D), Houston

Dist. 17

- William Stone (D), Galveston

Dist. 18

- Fred Mauritz (D), Ganado

Dist. 19

- Rudolph A. Weinert (D), Seguin

Dist. 20

- Houghton Brownlee (D), Austin

Dist. 21

- Karl Lovelady (D), Meridian

Dist. 22

- Royston Lanning (D), Jacksboro

Dist. 23

- George Moffett (D), Chillicothe

Dist. 24

- Pat Bullock (D), Snyder

Dist. 25

- Penrose Metcalfe (D), San Angelo

Dist. 26

- J. Franklin Spears (D), San Antonio

Dist. 27

- Rogers Kelly (D), Edinburg

Dist. 28

- Jesse Martin (D), Fort Worth

Dist. 29

- Henry L. Winfield (D), Fort Stockton

Dist. 30

- Marshall Formby (D), McAdoo

Dist. 31

- Grady Hazlewood (D), Amarillo

=== House ===
The House was composed of 150 Democrats.

House members included future Governors Price Daniel and Preston Smith.

== Sources ==
- Legislative Reference Library of Texas
