= Louis Crump =

American politician (1916–2019)

Member of the Texas State Senate from the 16th district
- In office 1959–1967

President pro tempore of the Texas Senate
- In office 1963–1967

Personal details
- Born: Louis Morris Crump; May 21, 1916 Santa Anna, Texas, U.S.
- Died: April 6, 2019 (aged 102) Austin Texas, U.S.
- Party: Democratic
- Occupation: lawyer

Louis Morris Crump (May 21, 1916 – April 6, 2019) was an American politician in the state of Texas. Crump was born in Santa Anna, Texas. He was a lawyer, residing in San Saba, Texas. He served in the Texas State Senate from 1959 to 1967 as a Democrat from the 16th district. From 1963 to 1967, he served as president pro tempore of the state senate. He turned 100 in May 2016 and died at the age of 102 in 2019.
