= Jimmy Phillips (politician) =

American politician

Jimmy Phillips (May 13, 1913 – January 14, 2002) was a Texas State Senator from Angleton, Texas in the 1940s and 1950s.

== Early life ==
Phillips was born in Brazoria County, Texas, on May 17, 1913. He was orphaned at an early age and raised by extended family and friends in Angleton. He helped to support himself from his earnings as a shoe shine boy and by selling newspapers and magazines. He attended the Angleton public schools. After graduating from Angleton High School, Jimmy graduated from the University of Texas and the University of Texas Law School.

== Political service ==
In 1940, Phillips was elected to the Texas House of Representatives from Brazoria County, and he was re-elected in 1942. Early in 1943, Phillips resigned as a state representative and volunteered to become a private in the U.S. Army. After serving in military intelligence in the U.S. Army, he was honorably discharged having reached the rank of sergeant in 1946. Later that same year, Phillips was elected to the Texas Senate representing the 17th Senate District which included all of Brazoria, Chambers, Fort Bend, Galveston, Matagorda and Wharton counties. Senator Phillips served in the Texas Senate from January 1947 until 1963. In 1953, he was elected by the other senators to serve as President Pro Tem of the Texas Senate.

In his obituary, the newspaper wrote, "As a state senator, Jimmy was extremely cautious about spending the money paid into the state treasury by Texas citizens. During his years serving the people of Texas, it was not uncommon to see newspaper headlines like "Phillips makes lone stand against more spending." Jimmy believed in spending money wisely and carefully, in the right place and at the right time, and had the reputation for being an ardent champion of the poor. During his years in the Senate, the Houston Post once said of him: "He is a warm-hearted, even sentimental individual who has a sincere sympathy for the poor and unfortunate. His eyes sometimes fill with tears when he talks about the need for more charity beds to treat children with cleft palates and twisted legs, and for years he has resisted fiercely any effort by the Legislature to raise college tuition." His varied occupational background proved valuable in connection with all types of legislation, but he concentrated his efforts on improving the state hospital system and controlling the cost of state college tuition and keeping the state colleges growing to keep them open to new students. He conducted what amounted to a single-handed investigation of the veterans land scandal while he was a member of the Senate's general investigating committee.

== Private life ==
After Phillips' discharge from the Army, he became active in the American Legion. He served as the Brazoria County chairman for the National Foundation for Infantile Paralysis. Phillips also started the Brazoria County 100 Club.

Texas House of Representatives
Preceded by unknown	Member of the Texas House of Representatives from District unknown (Angleton); 1940–1943	Succeeded by unknown
Texas Senate
Preceded by William E. Stone	Texas State Senator from District 17 (Galveston); 1948–1960	Succeeded by A. R. Schwartz
