= A. R. Schwartz =

American politician (1926–2018)

President pro tempore of the Texas Senate
- In office March 31, 1965 – January 14, 1966
- Preceded by: Tom Creighton
- Succeeded by: Galloway Calhoun

Member of the Texas Senate from the 17th district
- In office January 9, 1960 – January 13, 1981
- Preceded by: Jimmy Phillips
- Succeeded by: J.E. Brown

Member of the Texas House of Representatives from the 21-2 district
- In office January 11, 1955 – January 13, 1959
- Preceded by: Jean Edmond Hosey
- Succeeded by: Jerome Jones

Personal details
- Born: Aaron Robert Schwartz; July 17, 1926
- Died: August 10, 2018 (aged 92)
- Party: Democratic
- Spouse: Marilyn Cohn
- Children: 4
- Education: Texas A&M University; University of Texas School of Law

Military service
- Allegiance: United States
- Branch/service: United States Navy
- Battles/wars: World War II

Aaron Robert Schwartz, better known as A. R. Schwartz or "Babe" Schwartz (July 17, 1926 – August 10, 2018), was an American politician, lawyer, and lobbyist who served in the Texas House of Representatives from 1955 to 1959 and in the Texas Senate from 1960 to 1981, representing his native Galveston, Texas. He was known for being a liberal "yellow-dog" Democrat.

== Personal life ==
Schwartz attended the Texas A&M University at College Station and the University of Texas School of Law at Austin. He served in the United States Navy during World War II. He was married to the former Marilyn Cohn of Harlingen, and they had four sons: Bob, Dick (both reside in Houston), John (lives in Pflugerville), and Tom (lives in Florida).

== Texas Legislature ==
Schwartz served in the Texas House of Representatives representing Galveston County (District 21, Place 2) between January 11, 1955, and January 13, 1959. After serving in the house, he served in the Texas Senate for District 17 between January 9, 1960, and January 13, 1981. Additionally, while in the Texas Senate, he served as president pro tempore between March 31, 1965, and January 14, 1966, during part of the 59th legislature.

As a legislator, he specialized in legislation to protect the environment and manage the resources of coastal areas. He earned a reputation as a staunch liberal speaker. In Molly Ivins's book "Molly Ivins Can't Say That, Can She?", Ivins referred to Schwartz as a "white-maned pixie" and called him one of the legislature's "excellent orators." Texas Monthly, who named Schwartz as one of the "Ten Best Legislators" on four occasions, also took note, stating that "during the sixties and seventies, the best entertainment the Capitol had to offer was the oratory of Senator Schwartz". As a legislator, Schwartz was known for his spirited feuds, in particular with fellow state senators William T. "Bill" Moore of Bryan and William Neff Patman. In a dispute with Hilmar Moore, the longtime mayor of Richmond, Texas, over Moore's appointment to the state's Public Welfare Board, Schwartz said, "You can have that job over my dead body." Moore replied, "Senator, I can't think of any other way I'd rather have it."

In the 1979 legislative session, Schwartz helped lead the "Killer Bees," a group of state senators who brought the legislature to a standstill by going into hiding and breaking the Senate quorum. During his tenure as a lawmaker, he served on every major committee of the legislature, and served as the chairman of the Military Affairs, Rules, Jurisprudence and Natural Resources Committees.

== Later life ==
Schwartz lost the 1980 election to Republican J. E. "Buster" Brown, a candidate who was recruited by then 29-year-old Karl Rove, working at the time for Texas Governor Bill Clements. After his defeat, Schwartz worked as a lobbyist, but he also continued to work with the legislature. In October 2008, he was appointed to the House Select Committee on Hurricane Ike Storm Devastation to the Texas Gulf Coast by the then-Speaker of the House, Tom Craddick, as the committee's public member. In May 2016, Galveston named a stretch of restored beach "Babe's Beach" in his honor. At the ceremony, Mayor Jim Yarbrough said, "We should have done this for Babe Schwartz many years ago...You've given a lifetime of commitment not only to Galveston and our community, but to this state."

== Media appearances ==
Schwartz was a lobbyist and legislative consultant on local, state and national issues. He has appeared in the PBS documentary Vote For Me: Politics in America (1996) and Bush's Brain (2006). Between 1996 and 2005, he taught Legislation and Coastal Zone Management Law at the University of Houston Law Center as an adjunct professor. In 2009, he began teaching Coastal and Ocean Law at the University of Texas School of Law. In September 2008, he was quoted in The New York Times on the subject of damage to Galveston from Hurricane Ike and other hurricanes over the years. The 1900 Galveston hurricane that devastated Galveston, he said, was a "message from God." He explained: "God's message was, 'man wasn't meant to live on no damned island.'" In an Associated Press story after Hurricane Ike about the fact that the 1959 Texas Open Beaches Act, a state law protecting public access to beaches might cause some Galveston-area homes to be seized by the state, Schwartz said, "We're talking about damn fools that have built houses on the edge of the sea for as long as man could remember and against every advice anyone has given." That story, in turn, led to an attack on Schwartz by radio commentator Rush Limbaugh, who said, "You know, folks, it's one thing to be smacked by a natural disaster; it's quite another to have to be smacked around by the government that you're looking to for help." His oral history for the Texas Legacy Project is featured on the project's site and in a 2010 book published from those interviews.

== Political critic ==
Schwartz remained a keen observer of Texas politics, and his comments appeared in The New York Times, The Washington Post, 60 Minutes and many Texas newspapers and magazines. When Republican congressman Tom DeLay was first indicted in October 2005, many commentators predicted that he would bounce back politically; Schwartz, however, told The New York Times that "He's been gut-shot politically", and was proven right as DeLay never again sought office.

Texas House of Representatives
Preceded by Harold Seay	Member of the Texas House of Representatives from District 22 (Galveston); 1955–1959	Succeeded by Pete LaValle
Texas Senate
Preceded by Jimmy Phillips	Texas State Senator from District 17 (Galveston); 1960–1981	Succeeded by J. E. "Buster" Brown
