= Dorsey B. Hardeman =

American politician (1902–1992)

Dorsey Brodie Hardeman

Member of the Texas Senate from the 25th district
- In office 1947–1969
- Preceded by: Penrose Metcalfe
- Succeeded by: W. E. "Pete" Snelson

Texas State Representative from District 91 (including Tom Green County)
- In office 1939–1942
- Preceded by: Penrose Metcalfe
- Succeeded by: Burke T. Summers, Sr.

Mayor of San Angelo, Texas
- In office 1936–1938

Personal details
- Born: December 11, 1902 Henderson; Chester County; Tennessee, US
- Died: August 11, 1992 (aged 89) Austin, Travis County, Texas
- Resting place: Texas State Cemetery in Austin
- Party: Democratic
- Spouse: Geneva Moore Hardeman
- Education: Freed-Hardeman University; University of Florida; Vanderbilt University
- Occupation: Politician, businessman, rancher
- Profession: Lawyer

Military service
- Branch/service: United States Army Air Corps
- Rank: Judge Advocate General
- Battles/wars: World War II

Dorsey Brodie Hardeman (December 11, 1902 – August 11, 1992) was an American Democratic politician, attorney, businessman, farmer, and rancher from San Angelo, Texas.

== Background ==
Dorsey Hardeman was born in Henderson in Chester County, Tennessee, the son of Church of Christ minister N. B. Hardeman and Joanna Hardeman. He first studied at Freed-Hardeman College, co-founded by his father, but then attended the University of Florida in Gainesville, Florida and procured his LLB from Vanderbilt University Law School in Nashville, Tennessee. Dorsey Hardeman was a descendant of William P. Hardeman and Bailey Hardeman, two of the signers in Washington County in 1836 of the Texas Declaration of Independence.

== Move to Texas and political involvement ==
In 1932, Hardeman came to West Texas to practice law in San Angelo, the seat of Tom Green County. In 1936, he was elected mayor of San Angelo, a position that he held until 1938, when he was elected to the Texas House of Representatives from District 91 and served two two-year terms before he enlisted in the United States Army Air Corps, the forerunner of the Air Force. Sent to officers training school, he became a judge advocate general.

After his military service, Hardeman was elected in 1946 to the Texas State Senate from District 25, which then included Brewster, Coke, Coleman, Crane, Crockett, Edwards, Glasscock, Irion, Jeff Davis, Pecos, Presidio, Reagan, Runnels, Schleicher, Sterling, Sutton, Terrell, Tom Green, Upton, and Val Verde counties. Hardeman served in the upper legislative chamber for twenty-two years. He was unseated in the 1968 Democratic primary in Senate District 25 by W. E. "Pete" Snelson, a businessman from Midland, who held the seat until 1983.

Hardeman became a powerful, well-known senator because of his knowledge of the lengthy and intricate Texas Constitution, implemented in 1876 and still in use. Through his chairmanship of the Senate State Affairs Committee, Hardeman became a master of legislative procedures. He worked to revise the code of criminal procedure. He pushed for completion of Angelo State University, a four-year state-supported institution in San Angelo. He supported the construction of the Stacy Dam and Reservoir (now the S. W. Freese Dam and the O. H. Ivie Reservoir) on the Upper Colorado River of Texas.

In 1969, Governor Preston E. Smith named Hardeman executive director of the Texas Water Commission, a position which he retained for two years. From 1971 to 1982, he was a commissioner of the agency.

== Private and business life ==
A successful businessman, Hardeman owned the historic San Angelus Hotel in San Angelo and held both ranching and farming interests in Texas and Colorado. He also owned a title company. He was a member of the Sons of the American Revolution, knighted by the Sons of the Republic of Texas in the Order of San Jacinto, a member of Sons of Confederate Veterans, Military Order of the Stars and Bars, the Baronial Order of Magna Charta, The Huguenot Society of America, and the Knights of Malta. He was an honorary member in the Greek order of St. Denis of Zante. Hardeman was a lifetime member of the Texas State Historical Association. He was also affiliated with the American Legion and the State Bar of Texas and additionally the bar associations of Travis and Tom Green counties.

Dorsey Hardeman was married to the former Geneva Moore (born 1918) of Brownwood, Texas. He died in Austin at the age of eighty-nine and is interred there at the Texas State Cemetery.

== See also ==
- List of mayors of San Angelo, Texas
