= William T. Moore (Texas politician) =

American politician

Member of the Texas Senate
- In office January 11, 1949 – January 13, 1981
- Preceded by: Joseph Alton York
- Succeeded by: Kent Caperton
- Constituency: 14th district (1949–1953); 11th district (1953–1967); 5th district (1967–1981)

President pro tempore of the Texas Senate
- In office November 13, 1957 – December 3, 1957
- Preceded by: J. Searcy Bracewell Jr.
- Succeeded by: Jep S. Fuller

Member of the Texas House of Representatives from the 26th district
- In office January 14, 1947 – January 11, 1949
- Preceded by: George E. Adams
- Succeeded by: James K. Presnal

Personal details
- Born: William Tyler Moore; April 9, 1918 Wheelock, Texas, U.S.
- Died: May 27, 1999 (aged 81) Bryan, Texas, U.S.
- Party: Democratic
- Spouse: Macille Moore
- Children: 1
- Education: Texas A&M University (BS); University of Texas at Austin (LLB)
- Occupation: Lawyer; businessman; politician

William Tyler Moore, Sr. (April 9, 1918 – May 27, 1999) was an attorney and businessman in Bryan, Texas, who was a conservative Democratic member of the Texas State Senate from District 5 from 1967 until 1981. Moore originally represented District 14 from 1949 to 1953 and then revised District 11 from 1953 to 1967. In 1957, Moore was the Senate President Pro Tempore in the 55th legislative session.

After thirty-two years in the Senate, Moore was unseated in the 1980 party primary by former Bryan City Judge Kent Caperton, who was born the year that Moore entered the upper chamber of the state legislature. Caperton received 52.6 percent of the ballots cast.

Though he was dubbed by the media as the "Bull of the Brazos," a reference to the intrastate Brazos River to the west of Bryan, Moore is also remembered as the lawmaker who pushed most forcefully for the physical expansion of the campus and the admission of women to his alma mater, Texas A&M University in College Station.

== Background ==
Moore was born in Wheelock in Robertson County, Texas, and reared in Edge in Brazos County. His first job was as a salesman at the former Montgomery Ward in downtown Bryan. He graduated in 1940 from TAMU with a Bachelor of Science degree in economics and taught at his alma mater until 1943, when he joined the United States Army Air Corps, the forerunner of the Air Force. He was sent into active duty in both theaters of the war and discharged as a sergeant in 1946. That same year he was elected to a single term from District 26 in the Texas House of Representatives from Brazos County. As a legislator he enrolled at the University of Texas Law School in Austin, from which he received his degree in 1949 and was already in the first of his eight full terms in the state Senate.

In addition to his law practice, Moore and J. C. Culpepper developed the Manor East Mall and the Sherwood Health Care Facility in Bryan. He also led the legislative fight to have St. Joseph Hospital in Bryan declared a regional health provider.

== Powerful legislator ==
Moore was sometimes called "the most powerful man in state government" for his ability to get the state Senate to follow his lead. Robert "Bob" Cherry, a former assistant chancellor at Texas A&M, told the Bryan-College Station Eagle that Moore "never forgot a friend." Though considered conservative politically, Moore said that he was willing to listen to liberals: "I figured it was somebody's own business if he wanted to be a liberal. I never fell out with anybody on how they voted. In the 1950s, the Senate was one big fraternity...." One Senate liberal with whom Moore frequently quarreled was A.R. "Babe" Schwartz from Galveston, who once visited Moore's Senate Affairs Committee and called Moore "obnoxious." Moore replied by calling Schwartz "repulsive." Moore said that he had passed many bills favored by his constituents but had blocked "a lot of bad legislation too."

Working across party lines, Moore was friendly with Republican U.S. Representative Phil Gramm, who had been an economics professor at TAMU. He also worked well with Governor Bill Clements, who in 1980 asked his friend Phil Adams, a Bryan businessman, to work in what turned out to have been Moore's last campaign. Despite their partisan difference, Clements said, "I don't care. He's the most important man there, and I want him back." In 1993, Moore was a large donor to the election of Republican state treasurer Kay Bailey Hutchison to the United States Senate for the seat vacated by the Democrat Lloyd M. Bentsen.

The race against Caperton was the first challenge that Moore had faced in years. Caperton, the 31-year-old opponent, TAMU graduate, and formerly from Caldwell in Burleson County, courted younger voters in the district who remained steadfast to the Democratic Party. A number of former Democratic primary voters had by 1980 turned Republican and were no longer available to vote to re-nominate Moore. Former Brazos County Judge W. T. "Tom" McDonald recalled that Moore was "devastated" when he was unseated by Caperton: "The district had changed, and he didn't realize it and was blindsided."

== Promoting Texas A&M ==
Bob Cherry called Moore "the father of the modern Texas A&M University," noting that Moore could skillfully pass or kill bills in the interest of TAMU. On March 3, 1953, Moore first introduced a resolution calling for the admission of women to TAMU. The TAMU historian Henry C. Dethloff in A Centennial History of Texas A&M University, 1876-1976, noted that Moore believed the institution "had stagnated since World War II and had experienced a decline in enrollment partially because of its refusal to become coeducational." Though the Texas Senate adopted Moore's resolution by voice vote, older alumni voiced objections in telephone calls and letters. Senators then reversed themselves on a 28–1 vote, with Moore being the dissenter. Dethloff continued, "Moore predicted that A&M would be coeducational within ten years," exactly on the timetable.

According to Cherry, Moore in 1963 informed newly inaugurated Governor John B. Connally, Jr., that he would not vote to confirm any appointee to the TAMU Board of Regents unless the nominee favored coeducational status. Connally's first nominee, a West Texan, opposed admitting women, and Connally was soon compelled to withdraw the nomination. The two subsequent nominations, Gardiner Symonds of Houston and Albert P. Beutel of Lake Jackson, supported coeducational status and were confirmed. On April 27, 1963, the regents agreed to admit the first women on a limited basis.

In May 1976, Texas Aggie magazine said that Moore had "done more for Texas A&M University in recent years than any other individual He authored or co-authored every bill that affected Texas A&M and its growth."

== Death and legacy ==
Moore died in Bryan at the age of eighty-one. He was survived by his wife, Macille Moore of Bryan; a son and daughter-in-law, W. Tyler Moore, Jr., an attorney in Bryan, and Mary M. Moore, a Certified Public Accountant who tried unsuccessfully to capture her father-in-law's former Senate seat. Services were Moore were held on May 30, 1999, at First Presbyterian Church in Bryan.

Tom McDonald said that he always knew where his friend Moore stood: "He wasn't like one of those spin- doctor types we have now. When he was saying something, you knew it was coming from Bill Moore, not from some speechwriter or pollster or someone like that." Tyler Moore said that his father had "a genuinely kind heart beneath that gruff exterior."

Steve Ogden, a Bryan Republican, defeated Democrat Mary Moore in the special election held in 1997 and then the regular general election of 1998 for her father-in-law's former seat. Ogden called Moore "one of the giants of Texas politics who built many of the things we take for granted today. Texas A&M would be substantially different and not as great a university if it weren't for him. [He set the foundation] for everything that deals with state government within two hundred miles of Bryan-College Station. He left a legacy, and I am sorry to hear of his passing."

Preceded by Neveille Colson	Texas State Senator from District 5; 1967–1981	Succeeded by Kent Caperton
Preceded by George M. Parkhouse	Texas State Senator from District 11; 1953–1967	Succeeded by Barbara Jordan
Preceded by Joseph Alton York	Texas State Senator from District 14; 1949–1953	Succeeded by Johnnie B. Rogers
Preceded by J. Searcy Bracewell, Jr.	Texas Senate President Pro Tempore; 1957	Succeeded by Jep S. Fuller
Preceded by George E. Adams	State Representative from District 26 (Brazos County); 1947–1949	Succeeded by James K. Presnal
