= 2024 Texas Senate election =

- November 5, 2024

15 of the 31 seats in the Texas Senate 16 seats needed for a majority
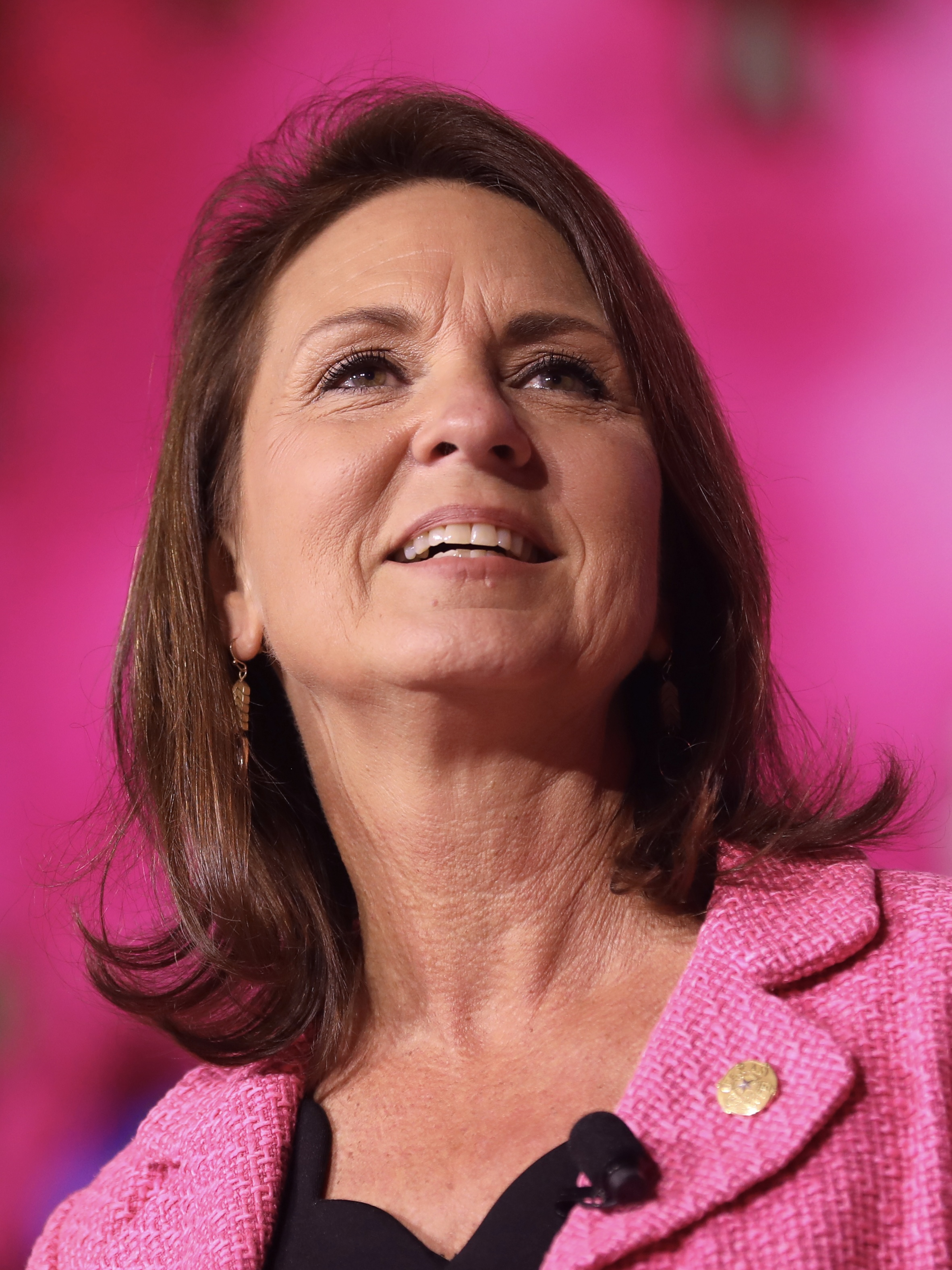

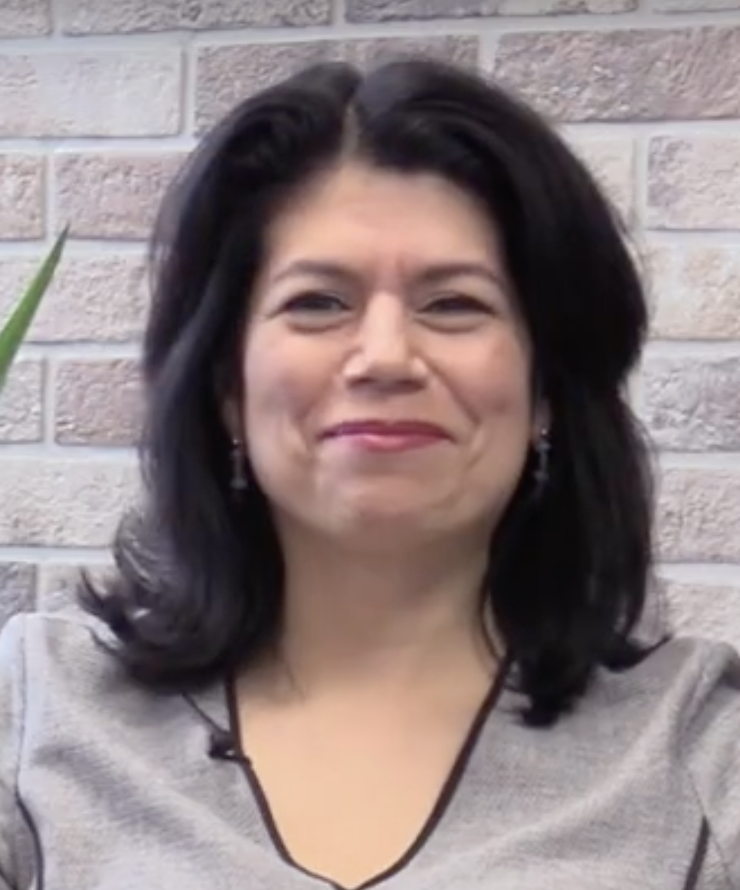
	Majority party	Minority party
Leader	Angela Paxton	Carol Alvarado
Party	Republican	Democratic
Leader since	September 16, 2023	January 8, 2020
Leader's seat	8th–McKinney	6th–Houston
Last election	19 seats, 54.06%	12 seats, 41.94%
Seats before	19	12
Seats won	8	7
Seats after	20	11
Seat change	▲1	▼1
Popular vote	2,196,004	2,678,156
Percentage	45.00%	54.88%
Swing	▼9.06%	▲12.94%
- Republican hold Republican gain Democratic hold No election Republican: 40–50% 50–60% 60–70% Democratic: 60–70% ≥90%
Majority Leader before election
Angela Paxton
Republican
Elected Majority Leader
Tan Parker
Republican

Elections to the Texas Senate were held on November 5, 2024, for 15 of the 31 Senate districts across the state of Texas. Numerous other federal, state, and local elections were held on this date. The winners of this election will serve full four-year terms covering the 89th Texas Legislature and the 90th Texas Legislature. Republicans have held a majority in the Texas Senate since January 14, 1997, as a result of the 1996 elections. Republicans won eight of the fifteen seats up for election, flipping one from the Democrats. Due to the high number of uncontested seats, however, Democratic candidates received more votes statewide than Republican candidates.

Primary elections were held on March 5, 2024, and any necessary runoffs were held on May 28.

== Partisan background ==
In the 2020 presidential election in Texas, Republican Donald Trump won 19 State Senate districts, while Democrat Joe Biden won 12 districts. In the 2024 presidential election in Texas, Donald Trump won 2 more districts than he did in 2020 with 21, while Democrat Kamala Harris won 10 districts. In the aftermath of the 2024 election, Senate district 20 flipped to Trump by 4.3%, however incumbent Democratic State Senator Juan Hinojosa held the seat in a uncontested general election.

2020 Election results

Trump
50–60%
60–70%
70–80%
Biden
50–60%
60–70%
70–80%

2024 Election results

Trump
50–60%
60–70%
70–80%
80–90%
Harris
50–60%
60–70%
70–80%

== Background ==
Republicans expanded their majority by one seat to a 19–12 margin in the 2022 elections, picking up a seat anchored in Tarrant County that had been redrawn to significantly favor them but failing to win a competitive seat in the Rio Grande Valley.

During the regular session, the legislature expanded school armed security measures, banned diversity, equity and inclusion offices at universities, and allowed school districts to hire or volunteer chaplains for mental health support for students. Republican infighting in the House led to the collapse of a school voucher bill during the regular session despite the Senate easily passing it. Governor Greg Abbott vowed to call special sessions until it passed. Efforts to legalize online sports betting and casino gambling found a resurgence in the House late in the session, with a bill to legalize online sports betting passing the House. Neither proposal received any hearings in the Senate due to opposition from lieutenant governor Dan Patrick.

On May 27, 2023, the House voted 121–23 to impeach attorney general Ken Paxton after a House committee found that he had used taxpayer funds to settle a legal dispute. The Senate voted to acquit him of all charges in September 2023.

== Retirements ==
One incumbent did not seek re-election.

=== Republicans ===
1. District 30: Drew Springer retired.

== Incumbents defeated ==
=== In the general election ===
==== Democrats ====
1. District 27: Morgan LaMantia lost to Adam Hinojosa.

== Special elections ==
1. District 15: John Whitmire (D) was elected Mayor of Houston in 2023 and resigned from the Senate on December 31, 2023. Molly Cook won the special election held on May 4, 2024.

Texas's 15th State Senate District Special Election, 2024
Party	Candidate	Votes	%
Democratic	Molly Cook	9,370	57.06%
Democratic	Jarvis Johnson	7,052	42.94%
Total votes		16,422	100.0%
Democratic hold			

== Campaign ==
Democrat Nathan Johnson was the only incumbent senator being challenged in the primary elections. Republican Drew Springer's retirement and Democrat John Whitmire's resignation created open races for their seats. Democrat Morgan LaMantia was the only senator expected to face a competitive general election.

== Predictions ==
Due to the size of the Republicans' majority and the low number of competitive seats, most analysts consider a change in control of the chamber to be unlikely.

=== Statewide ===
Source	Ranking	As of
CNalysis	Solid R	August 6, 2024
Sabato's Crystal Ball	Safe R	June 18, 2024

=== Competitive districts ===
District	Incumbent	Last Result	CNalysis (Note: CNalysis has two separate sets of predictions: Classic (Analyst ratings only), and Expanded (Classic alongside recent statewide election results). This table uses the Classic set.) Oct. 21, 2024	Result
27th	Morgan LaMantia	50.18% D	Tilt R (flip)	49.38% R (flip)

== Results summary ==
Summary of the November 5, 2024 Texas Senate election results
Party	Candidates	Votes		Seats				
Party	Candidates	No.	%	Before	Up	Won	After	+/–
Republican	10	2,196,004	45.00	19	7	8	20	▲1
Democratic	15	2,678,156	54.88	12	8	7	11	▼1
Green	1	5,956	0.12	0	0	0	0	Steady
Total		4,880,116	100.00	31	15	15	31	Steady

Popular vote
Democratic	54.88%
Republican	45.00%
Green	0.12%

Senate seats won
Republican	55.00%
Democratic	45.00%

== Summary of results by district ==
† - Incumbent not seeking re-election

State Senate District	Incumbent	Party	Elected Senator	Party
6th	Carol Alvarado	Dem	Carol Alvarado	Dem
7th	Paul Bettencourt	Rep	Paul Bettencourt	Rep
8th	Angela Paxton	Rep	Angela Paxton	Rep
10th	Phil King	Rep	Phil King	Rep
12th	Tan Parker	Rep	Tan Parker	Rep
14th	Sarah Eckhardt	Dem	Sarah Eckhardt	Dem
15th	Molly Cook (Note: Elected in a May 4, 2024, special election to fill incumbent vacancy left by Democrat John Whitmire, who resigned to become Mayor of Houston on December 31, 2023.)	Dem	Molly Cook	Dem
16th	Nathan M. Johnson	Dem	Nathan M. Johnson	Dem
17th	Joan Huffman	Rep	Joan Huffman	Rep
20th	Juan Hinojosa	Dem	Juan Hinojosa	Dem
23rd	Royce West	Dem	Royce West	Dem
25th	Donna Campbell	Rep	Donna Campbell	Rep
27th	Morgan LaMantia	Dem	Adam Hinojosa	Rep
29th	Cesar Blanco	Dem	Cesar Blanco	Dem
30th	Drew Springer†	Rep	Brent Hagenbuch	Rep

== Detailed results ==
=== District 6 ===
Incumbent Democrat Carol Alvarado won re-election.

District 6 election
Party	Candidate	Votes	%
Democratic	Carol Alvarado (incumbent)	119,280	63.01%
Republican	Martha Fierro	70,013	36.99%
Total votes		189,293	100.00%
Democratic hold			

=== District 7 ===
Incumbent Republican Paul Bettencourt won re-election.

District 7 Democratic primary
Party	Candidate	Votes	%
Democratic	Michelle Gwinn	12,707	55.66%
Democratic	Nasir Malik	10,122	44.34%
Total votes		22,829	100.00%

District 7 election
Party	Candidate	Votes	%
Republican	Paul Bettencourt (incumbent)	251,489	63.41%
Democratic	Michelle Gwinn	145,100	36.59%
Total votes		396,589	100.00%
Republican hold			

=== District 8 ===
Incumbent Republican Angela Paxton won re-election.

District 8 election
Party	Candidate	Votes	%
Republican	Angela Paxton (incumbent)	269,743	59.36%
Democratic	Rachel Mello	184,642	40.64%
Total votes		454,385	100.00%
Republican hold			

=== District 10 ===
Incumbent Republican Phil King won re-election.

District 10 election
Party	Candidate	Votes	%
Republican	Phil King (incumbent)	227,475	61.71%
Democratic	Andy Morris	141,163	38.29%
Total votes		368,638	100.00%
Republican hold			

=== District 12 ===
Incumbent Republican Tan Parker won re-election.

District 12 election
Party	Candidate	Votes	%
Republican	Tan Parker (incumbent)	277,734	61.36%
Democratic	Stephanie Draper	174,875	38.64%
Total votes		452,609	100.00%
Republican hold			

=== District 14 ===
Incumbent Democrat Sarah Eckhardt won re-election unopposed.

District 14 election
Party	Candidate	Votes	%
Democratic	Sarah Eckhardt (incumbent)	321,035	100.00%
Total votes		321,035	100.00%
Democratic hold			

=== District 15 ===
Former Senator, Democrat John Whitmire was elected Mayor of Houston in 2023 and resigned from this seat, creating a vacancy. A special election to fill his unexpired term was held on May 4, 2024, with Molly Cook winning. Cook narrowly won the Democratic primary runoff for a full term on May 28.

District 15 Democratic primary
Party	Candidate	Votes	%
Democratic	Jarvis Johnson	17,953	36.19%
Democratic	Molly Cook	10,213	20.59%
Democratic	Todd Litton	7,859	15.84%
Democratic	Michelle Anderson Bonton	5,291	10.67%
Democratic	Alberto "Beto" Cardenas	5,196	10.48%
Democratic	Karthik Soora	3,091	6.23%
Total votes		49,603	100.00%

District 15 Democratic primary runoff
Party	Candidate	Votes	%
Democratic	Molly Cook (incumbent)	9,506	50.16%
Democratic	Jarvis Johnson	9,444	49.84%
Total votes		18,782	100.00%

District 15 election
Party	Candidate	Votes	%
Democratic	Molly Cook (incumbent)	200,680	61.90%
Republican	Joseph L. Trahan	123,515	38.10%
Total votes		324,195	100.00%
Democratic hold			

=== District 16 ===
Incumbent Democrat Nathan M. Johnson won re-election. He defeated state representative Victoria Neave in the Democratic primary and was unopposed in the general election.

District 16 Democratic primary
Party	Candidate	Votes	%
Democratic	Nathan M. Johnson (incumbent)	19,734	59.19%
Democratic	Victoria Neave	13,604	40.81%
Total votes		33,338	100.00%

District 16 election
Party	Candidate	Votes	%
Democratic	Nathan M. Johnson (incumbent)	187,557	100.00%
Total votes		187,557	100.00%
Democratic hold			

=== District 17 ===
Incumbent Republican Joan Huffman won re-election.

District 17 election
Party	Candidate	Votes	%
Republican	Joan Huffman (incumbent)	238,328	64.16%
Democratic	Kathy Cheng	133,127	35.84%
Total votes		371,455	100.00%
Republican hold			

=== District 20 ===
Incumbent Democrat Juan Hinojosa won re-election unopposed.

District 20 election
Party	Candidate	Votes	%
Democratic	Juan Hinojosa (incumbent)	178,987	100.00%
Total votes		178,987	100.00%
Democratic hold			

=== District 23 ===
Incumbent Democrat Royce West won re-election unopposed.

District 23 election
Party	Candidate	Votes	%
Democratic	Royce West (incumbent)	253,413	100.00%
Total votes		253,413	100.00%
Democratic hold			

=== District 25 ===
Incumbent Republican Donna Campbell won re-election.

District 25 election
Party	Candidate	Votes	%
Republican	Donna Campbell (incumbent)	321,653	63.57%
Democratic	Merrie Fox	184,312	36.43%
Total votes		505,965	100.00%
Republican hold			

=== District 27 ===
District 27 election

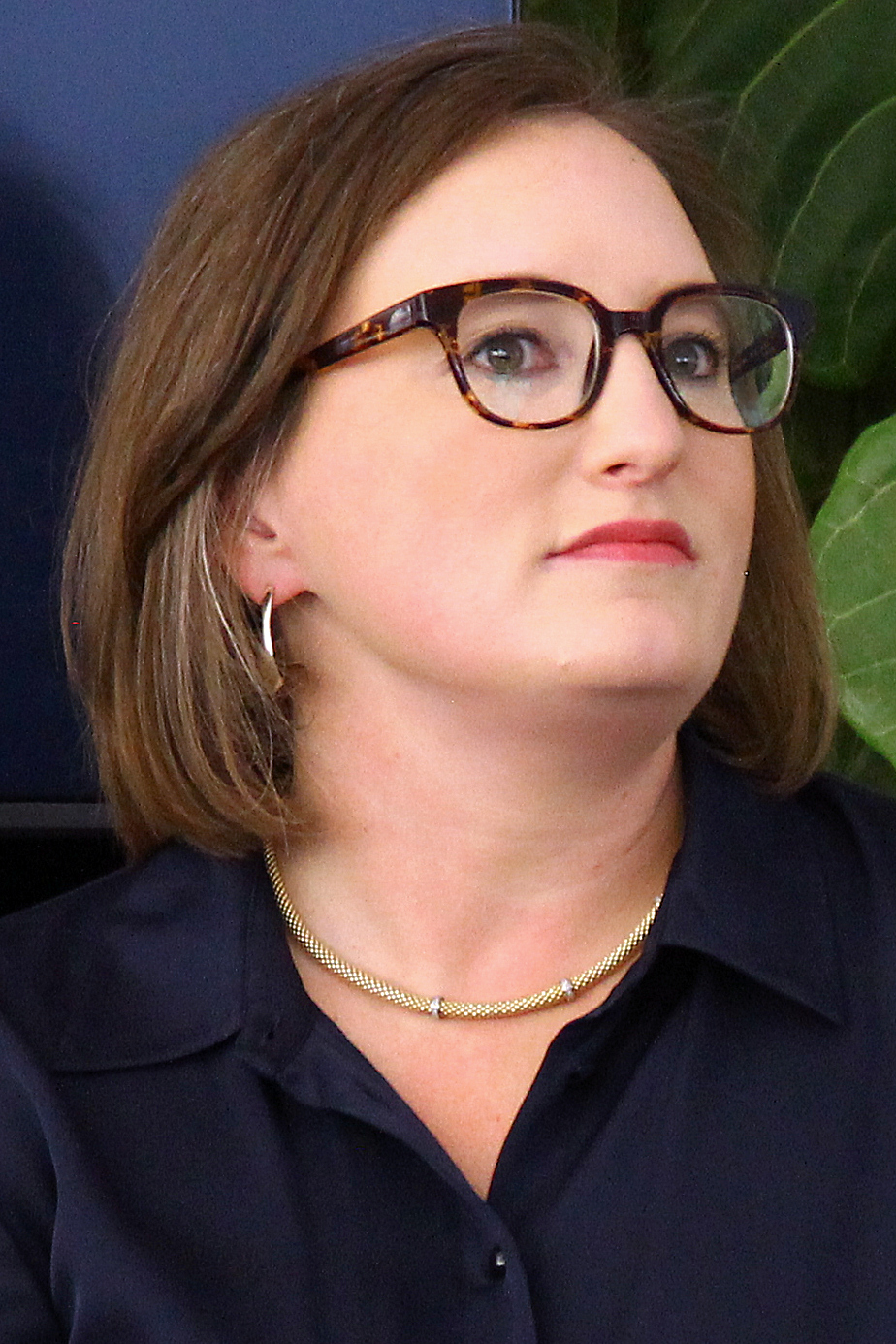
Nominee	Adam Hinojosa	Morgan LaMantia
Party	Republican	Democratic
Popular vote	126,073	123,305
Percentage	49.38%	48.29%
- County results Hinojosa: 50–60% 60–70% LaMantia: 50–60%
Texas Senator before election
Morgan LaMantia
Democratic Party
Elected Texas Senator
Adam Hinojosa
Republican Party

Incumbent Democrat Morgan LaMantia ran for re-election. She faced a rematch against Republican Adam Hinojosa, whom she narrowly defeated in 2022. This race was the only one in the state expected to have a competitive general election. Hinojosa had been endorsed by former Democratic senator Eddie Lucio Jr., who held the seat before LaMantia, citing Hinojosa's pro-life position on abortion. Hinojosa narrowly won, becoming the first Republican to win a seat in the Senate from the Rio Grande Valley since 1869.

District 27 election
Party	Candidate	Votes	%
Republican	Adam Hinojosa	126,073	49.38%
Democratic	Morgan LaMantia (incumbent)	123,305	48.29%
Green	Robin Lee Vargas	5,956	2.33%
Total votes		255,334	100.00%
Republican gain from Democratic			

=== District 29 ===
Incumbent Democrat Cesar Blanco won re-election unopposed.

District 29 election
Party	Candidate	Votes	%
Democratic	Cesar Blanco (incumbent)	174,731	100.00%
Total votes		174,731	100.00%
Democratic hold			

=== District 30 ===
Incumbent Republican Drew Springer retired.

District 30 Republican primary
Party	Candidate	Votes	%
Republican	Brent Hagenbuch	35,262	36.38%
Republican	Jace Yarbrough	32,899	33.94%
Republican	Carrie de Moor	17,069	17.61%
Republican	Cody Clark	11,704	12.07%
Total votes		96,934	100.00%

District 30 Republican primary runoff
Party	Candidate	Votes	%
Republican	Brent Hagenbuch	18,779	56.65%
Republican	Jace Yarbrough	14,368	43.35%
Total votes		33,147	100.00%

District 30 Democratic primary
Party	Candidate	Votes	%
Democratic	Michael Braxton	7,833	37.72%
Democratic	Dale Frey	6,856	33.02%
Democratic	Matthew McGhee	6,077	29.26%
Total votes		20,766	100.00%

District 30 Democratic primary runoff
Party	Candidate	Votes	%
Democratic	Dale Frey	1,737	56.99%
Democratic	Michael Braxton	1,311	43.01%
Total votes		3,048	100.00%

District 30 election
Party	Candidate	Votes	%
Republican	Brent Hagenbuch	289,981	65.03%
Democratic	Dale Frey	155,949	34.97%
Total votes		445,930	100.00%
Republican hold			

== See also ==
- 2024 Texas elections
