= 89th Texas Legislature =

2025 meeting of the Texas legislature

←	88th	90th	→
- The Seal of Texas

Overview
- Legislative body: Texas State Legislature
- Jurisdiction: Texas
- Term: January 14, 2025 – June 2, 2025
- Election: 2024 general election

Senate
- Members: 31
- President of the Senate: Dan Patrick (R)
- Party control: Republican

House of Representatives
- Members: 150
- Speaker: Dustin Burrows (R–83)
- Party control: Republican

Sessions
- 1st: July 21, 2025 – August 15, 2025
- 2nd: August 15, 2025 – September 4, 2025

The 89th Texas Legislature is the meeting of the legislative branch of the U.S. state of Texas, composed of the Texas Senate and the Texas House of Representatives. The regular session ended on June 2, 2025.

All 150 seats in the Texas House of Representatives and 15 seats in the Texas Senate were up for election in November 2024, with Republicans continuing their majority in both chambers.

== Planned events ==
- January 14, 2025: Legislature convened at noon (CST).
- June 2, 2025: Legislature adjourned sine die.
- July 21, 2025: 1st Called Session began.
- August 15, 2025: 2nd Called Session began.

== Session ==
=== House Speaker Election ===
House vote for Speaker For Burrows (85) Democrat for Burrows (49) Republican for Burrows (36) For Cook (55) Republican for Cook (52) Democrat for Cook (3) Not voting (10) Democrat not voting (9) Absent Democrat (1)

On September 10, 2024, prior to the 2024 election, 48 house Republicans who opposed Phelan unanimously chose David Cook of the 96th district as the reformer-endorsed candidate in the next speakership election. Phelan was expected to seek support from Democrats in order to remain as speaker, but ultimately opted out of seeking a third term as speaker. Dustin Burrows of the 83rd district, an ally of Phelan, sought the speakership, relying on the support of Democratic representatives and Republicans who defeated primary challengers. On January 14, 2025, Burrows was elected Texas House Speaker after 49 Democrats joined 36 Republicans to back him in the second round of voting, defeating Cook by a vote of 85 to 55.

=== Quorum Break ===
On July 21, 2025, the legislature began a special session called by the governor to address several issues, including natural disaster relief, THC regulation, restricting abortion medication, and congressional redistricting. On August 3, Texas House Democrats left the state in order to prevent a quorum from meeting and voting on a new congressional map that heavily favored the Republican party. On August 4th, when the roll call showed that the chamber lacked a quorum, a call of the house was issued and the Speaker signed civil arrest warrants to try and secure the return of the absent members. Since the absent members were not within the state, the warrants were mostly symbolic. Due to rules enacted after the last quorum break in the 87th Legislature, the absent members were subject to fines of $500 per day. On August 7, Senator John Cornyn announced that the FBI had agreed to assist in reestablishing quorum.

Republican leadership in the state have initiated lawsuits against the missing Democrats. They argue that by leaving the state, the absent members have vacated their seats. The Supreme Court of Texas is currently examining the question, but a ruling is not expected until after the first called session is complete.

Given the national implications of the proposed congressional maps in the 2026 midterm elections, other states have threatened to also redraw their maps in partisan retaliation. Democratic leadership in California and New York have signaled their intent to counteract Republican gains. Republican leadership in Missouri and Florida have also discussed their plans to join in the redistricting push.

The quorum break ended on August 18. The House Democrats returned to the capitol after the first called session was ended, and California committed to introducing redistricting legislation to offset the partisan gains of the new Texas congressional maps. In order to ensure that a quorum would be present to allow a vote on the new maps, the members who had participated in the break had to sign a permission slip to leave the building. Once they left the building, they would be escorted by a state trooper who would make sure they return. At least one member, Nicole Collier, refused to agree with the police escort and had to remain in the building overnight. After the House voted out the new maps on August 20, the call of the house expired and members were able to move freely without the escort.

At the end of the second called session, the House changed its rules to further increase the penalties incurred on lawmakers who break quorum. These new penalties include increased fines, prohibitions on political fundraising, and potential loss of seniority and committee positions.

== Party summary ==
Membership map of 89th Texas Senate from January 2025 to June 2025

Membership map of 89th Texas Senate from June 2025 to October 2025

Membership map of 89th Texas Senate from October 2025 to January 2026

Membership map of 89th Texas Senate from January 2026 to present

=== Senate ===
Affiliation	Party (shading indicates majority caucus)		Total	Vacant
Affiliation	Democratic	Republican	Total	Vacant
End of previous legislature	12	19	31	0
Begin (January 14, 2025)	11	20	31	0
June 18, 2025 (Note: Republican Kelly Hancock resigned on June 18, 2025, after being appointed the Texas Comptroller of Public Accounts. Democrat Taylor Rehmet won a special election to fill the vacant seat on January 31, 2026.)	11	19	30	0
October 2, 2025 (Note: Republican Brandon Creighton resigned on June 18, 2025, after being appointed Chancellor of the Texas Tech University System.)	11	18	29	0
Latest voting share	35.48%	64.52%		

==== Leadership ====
- President of the Senate: Dan Patrick (R)
- President Pro Tempore:
1. Brandon Creighton (R) (Regular session, January 14 – June 2)
2. Charles Perry (R) (Ad Interim, June 2 – Present)
- Majority Leader: Tan Parker (R)
- Minority Leader: Carol Alvarado (D)

==== Members ====
- District 1: Bryan Hughes (R)
- District 2: Bob Hall (R)
- District 3: Robert Nichols (R)
- District 4: Vacant
- District 5: Charles Schwertner (R)
- District 6: Carol Alvarado (D)
- District 7: Paul Bettencourt (R)
- District 8: Angela Paxton (R)
- District 9: Taylor Rehmet (D)
- District 10: Phil King (R)
- District 11: Mayes Middleton (R)
- District 12: Tan Parker (R)
- District 13: Borris Miles (D)
- District 14: Sarah Eckhardt (D)
- District 15: Molly Cook (D)
- District 16: Nathan Johnson (D)
- District 17: Joan Huffman (R)
- District 18: Lois Kolkhorst (R)
- District 19: Roland Gutierrez (D)
- District 20: Juan Hinojosa (D)
- District 21: Judith Zaffirini (D)
- District 22: Brian Birdwell (R)
- District 23: Royce West (D)
- District 24: Pete Flores (R)
- District 25: Donna Campbell (R)
- District 26: Jose Menendez (D)
- District 27: Adam Hinojosa (R)
- District 28: Charles Perry (R)
- District 29: Cesar Blanco (D)
- District 30: Brent Hagenbuch (R)
- District 31: Kevin Sparks (R)

=== House of Representatives ===
Affiliation	Party (shading indicates majority caucus)		Total	Vacant
Affiliation	Democratic	Republican	Total	Vacant
End of previous legislature	64	86	150	0
Begin (January 14, 2025)	62	88	150	0
Latest voting share	41.3%	58.7%		

==== Leadership ====
- Speaker of the House: Dustin Burrows (R)
- Speaker Pro Tempore: Joe Moody (D)
- Majority Leader: Tom Oliverson (R)
- Minority Leader: Gene Wu (D)

==== Members ====
- District 1: Gary VanDeaver (R)
- District 2: Brent Money (R)
- District 3: Cecil Bell Jr. (R)
- District 4: Keith Bell (R)
- District 5: Cole Hefner (R)
- District 6: Daniel Alders (R)
- District 7: Jay Dean (R)
- District 8: Cody Harris (R)
- District 9: Trent Ashby (R)
- District 10: Brian Harrison (R)
- District 11: Joanne Shofner (R)
- District 12: Trey Wharton (R)
- District 13: Angelia Orr (R)
- District 14: Paul Dyson (R)
- District 15: Steve Toth (R)
- District 16: Will Metcalf (R)
- District 17: Stan Gerdes (R)
- District 18: Janis Holt (R)
- District 19: Ellen Troxclair (R)
- District 20: Terry Wilson (R)
- District 21: Dade Phelan (R)
- District 22: Christian Manuel (D)
- District 23: Terri Leo-Wilson (R)
- District 24: Greg Bonnen (R)
- District 25: Cody Vasut (R)
- District 26: Matt Morgan (R)
- District 27: Ron Reynolds (D)
- District 28: Gary Gates (R)
- District 29: Jeffrey Barry (R)
- District 30: AJ Louderback (R)
- District 31: Ryan Guillen (R)
- District 32: Todd Hunter (R)
- District 33: Katrina Pierson (R)
- District 34: Denise Villalobos (R)
- District 35: Oscar Longoria (D)
- District 36: Sergio Muñoz (D)
- District 37: Janie Lopez (R)
- District 38: Erin Gamez (D)
- District 39: Armando Martinez (D)
- District 40: Terry Canales (D)
- District 41: Robert Guerra (D)
- District 42: Richard Raymond (D)
- District 43: José Manuel Lozano (R)
- District 44: Alan Schoolcraft (R)
- District 45: Erin Zwiener (D)
- District 46: Sheryl Cole (D)
- District 47: Vikki Goodwin (D)
- District 48: Donna Howard (D)
- District 49: Gina Hinojosa (D)
- District 50: James Talarico (D)
- District 51: Lulu Flores (D)
- District 52: Caroline Harris Davila (R)
- District 53: Wesley Virdell (R)
- District 54: Brad Buckley (R)
- District 55: Hillary Hickland (R)
- District 56: Pat Curry (R)
- District 57: Richard Hayes (R)
- District 58: Helen Kerwin (R)
- District 59: Shelby Slawson (R)
- District 60: Mike Olcott (R)
- District 61: Keresa Richardson (R)
- District 62: Shelley Luther (R)
- District 63: Ben Bumgarner (R)
- District 64: Andy Hopper (R)
- District 65: Mitch Little (R)
- District 66: Matt Shaheen (R)
- District 67: Jeff Leach (R)
- District 68: David Spiller (R)
- District 69: James Frank (R)
- District 70: Mihaela Plesa (D)
- District 71: Stan Lambert (R)
- District 72: Drew Darby (R)
- District 73: Carrie Isaac (R)
- District 74: Eddie Morales (D)
- District 75: Mary González (D)
- District 76: Suleman Lalani (D)
- District 77: Vincent Perez (D)
- District 78: Joe Moody (D)
- District 79: Claudia Ordaz (D)
- District 80: Don McLaughlin (R)
- District 81: Brooks Landgraf (R)
- District 82: Tom Craddick (R)
- District 83: Dustin Burrows (R)
- District 84: Carl Tepper (R)
- District 85: Stan Kitzman (R)
- District 86: John Smithee (R)
- District 87: Caroline Fairly (R)
- District 88: Ken King (R)
- District 89: Candy Noble (R)
- District 90: Ramon Romero Jr. (D)
- District 91: David Lowe (R)
- District 92: Salman Bhojani (D)
- District 93: Nate Schatzline (R)
- District 94: Tony Tinderholt (R)
- District 95: Nicole Collier (D)
- District 96: David Cook (R)
- District 97: John McQueeney (R)
- District 98: Giovanni Capriglione (R)
- District 99: Charlie Geren (R)
- District 100: Venton Jones (D)
- District 101: Chris Turner (D)
- District 102: Ana-Maria Ramos (D)
- District 103: Rafael Anchia (D)
- District 104: Jessica González (D)
- District 105: Terry Meza (D)
- District 106: Jared Patterson (R)
- District 107: Linda Garcia (D)
- District 108: Morgan Meyer (R)
- District 109: Aicha Davis (D)
- District 110: Toni Rose (D)
- District 111: Yvonne Davis (D)
- District 112: Angie Button (R)
- District 113: Rhetta Bowers (D)
- District 114: John Bryant (D)
- District 115: Cassandra Hernandez (D)
- District 116: Trey Martinez Fischer (D)
- District 117: Philip Cortez (D)
- District 118: John Lujan (R)
- District 119: Elizabeth Campos (D)
- District 120: Barbara Gervin-Hawkins (D)
- District 121: Marc LaHood (R)
- District 122: Mark Dorazio (R)
- District 123: Diego Bernal (D)
- District 124: Josey Garcia (D)
- District 125: Ray Lopez (D)
- District 126: Sam Harless (R)
- District 127: Charles Cunningham (R)
- District 128: Briscoe Cain (R)
- District 129: Dennis Paul (R)
- District 130: Tom Oliverson (R)
- District 131: Alma Allen (D)
- District 132: Mike Schofield (R)
- District 133: Mano DeAyala (R)
- District 134: Ann Johnson (D)
- District 135: Jon Rosenthal (D)
- District 136: John Bucy III (D)
- District 137: Gene Wu (D)
- District 138: Lacey Hull (R)
- District 139: Charlene Ward Johnson (D)
- District 140: Armando Walle (D)
- District 141: Senfronia Thompson (D)
- District 142: Harold Dutton Jr. (D)
- District 143: Ana Hernandez (D)
- District 144: Mary Ann Perez (D)
- District 145: Christina Morales (D)
- District 146: Lauren Ashley Simmons (D)
- District 147: Jolanda Jones (D)
- District 148: Penny Morales Shaw (D)
- District 149: Hubert Vo (D)
- District 150: Valoree Swanson (R)

== Committees ==
Listed by chamber and then alphabetically by committee name, including chair and vice-chair.

=== Senate ===
On January 17, Dan Patrick, the president of the Texas Senate, announced the standing committee assignments.

Committee	Chair	Vice-chair
Administration	Bob Hall (R-2)	Adam Hinojosa (R-27)
Border Security	Brian Birdwell (R-22)	Pete Flores (R-24)
Business and Commerce	Charles Schwertner (R-5)	Phil King (R-10)
Criminal Justice	Pete Flores (R-24)	Tan Parker (R-12)
Economic Development	Phil King (R-10)	Kevin Sparks (R-31)
Education K-16	Brandon Creighton (R-4)	Donna Campbell (R-25)
Finance	Joan Huffman (R-17)	Juan Hinojosa (D-20)
Health and Human Services	Lois Kolkhorst (R-18)	Charles Perry (R-28)
Jurisprudence	Bryan Hughes (R-1)	Nathan Johnson (D-16)
Local Government	Paul Bettencourt (R-7)	Mayes Middleton (R-11)
Natural Resources	Brian Birdwell (R-22)	Judith Zaffirini (D-21)
Nominations	Donna Campbell (R-25)	Brent Hagenbuch (R-30)
State Affairs	Bryan Hughes (R-1)	Angela Paxton (R-8)
Transportation	Robert Nichols (R-3)	Royce West (D-23)
Veteran Affairs	Kelly Hancock (R-9)	Tan Parker (R-12)
Water, Agriculture & Rural Affairs	Charles Perry (R-28)	Kelly Hancock (R-9)

=== House ===
Prior to the 89th Legislature, the Texas House had a longstanding tradition of granting a number of committee chairmanships to members of the minority party. However, during the campaign for Speaker of the House David Cook and other Republicans campaigned on the issue of requiring committee chairmanships to go to members of the majority party. The compromise solution implemented by the newly elected Speaker Burrows was in addition to the banning of minority party chairmen all vice-chairs were to be members of the minority party. There were also newly created permanent standing subcommittees which did not have the same restriction on majority leadership.

On February 13, Burrows announced the assignments for the following standing committees.

Committee	Chair	Vice Chair
Agriculture & Livestock	Ryan Guillen (R-31)	Robert Guerra (D-41)
Appropriations	Greg Bonnen (R-24)	Mary E. González (D-104)
Calendars	Todd Hunter (R-32)	Toni Rose (D-110)
Corrections	Sam Harless (R-126)	Venton Jones (D-100)
Criminal Jurisprudence	John Smithee (R-86)	Gene Wu (D-137)
Culture, Recreation & Tourism	Will Metcalf (R-16)	Lulu Flores (D-51)
Delivery of Government Efficiency	Giovanni Capriglione (R-98)	Salman Bhojani (D-92)
Elections	Matt Shaheen (R-66)	John Bucy III (D-136)
Energy Resources	Drew Darby (R-72)	Eddie Morales (D-74)
General Investigating	Keith Bell (R-4)	Erin Gámez (D-38)
Higher Education	Terry Wilson (R-20)	Donna Howard (D-48)
Homeland Security, Public Safety & Veterans' Affairs	Cole Hefner (R-5)	Ray Lopez (D-125)
House Administration	Charlie Geren (R-99)	Sheryl Cole (D-46)
Human Services	Lacey Hull (R-138)	Christian Manuel (D-22)
Insurance	Jay Dean (R-7)	Hubert Vo (D-149)
Intergovernmental Affairs	Cecil Bell (R-3)	Erin Zwiener (D-45)
Judiciary & Civil Jurisprudence	Jeff Leach (R-67)	Ann Johnson (D-134)
Land & Resource Management	Gary Gates (R-28)	Suleman Lalani (D-76)
Licensing & Administrative Procedures	Dade Phelan (R-21)	Senfronia Thompson (D-141)
Local & Consent Calendars	Jared Patterson (R-106)	Rhetta Bowers (D-113)
Natural Resources	Cody Harris (R-8)	Armando Martinez (D-39)
Pensions, Investments & Financial Services	Stan Lambert (R-71)	Mihaela Plesa (D-70)
Public Education	Brad Buckley (R-54)	Diego Bernal (D-123)
Public Health	Gary VanDeaver (R-1)	Elizabeth Campos (D-119)
Redistricting	Cody Vasut (R-25)	Jon Rosenthal (D-135)
State Affairs	Ken King (R-88)	Ana Hernandez (D-143)
Trade, Workforce & Economic Development	Angie Button (R-112)	James Talarico (D-50)
Transportation	Tom Craddick (R-82)	Mary Ann Perez (D-144)
Ways & Means	Morgan Meyer (R-108)	Trey Martinez Fischer(D-116)

== See also ==
- List of Texas state legislatures
- Texas Senate Bill 412
