= Texas's 15th Senate district =

American legislative district

Texas's 15th State Senate district
Senator
Molly Cook; D–Houston
- Demographics: 25.5% White; 24.2% Black; 44.8% Hispanic; 5.8% Asian
- Population: 911,767

District 15 of the Texas Senate is a senatorial district that currently serves a portion of Harris county in the U.S. state of Texas.

The current senator from District 15 is Molly Cook. Cook was elected in a special election to succeed John Whitmire, who resigned on December 31, 2023, to take office as the mayor of Houston.

== Top 4 biggest cities in district ==
District 15 has a population of 793,108 with 574,255 that is at voting age from the 2010 census.

	Name	County	Pop. (Note: Population is based on the number of people in the district in that city, not the overall population of that city)
1	Houston	Harris	392,976
2	Baytown	Harris	29,778
3	Humble	Harris	14,810
4	Jacinto City	Harris	2,757

== Election history ==
Election history of District 27 from 1992. (Note: Uncontested primary elections are not shown.)

=== 2024 ===
Changes with 2022.

Texas general election, 2024: Senate District 15
Party	Candidate	Votes	%	±%
Democratic	Molly Cook	200,680	61.90	−3.43
Republican	Joseph L. Trahan	123,515	38.10	+3.43
Turnout		324,195		
Democratic hold		Swing		

=== 2024 (special) ===
2024 Texas Senate District 15 special election - 4 May 2024
Party	Candidate	Votes	%
Democratic	Molly Cook	9,370	57.06
Democratic	Jarvis Johnson	7,052	42.94
Majority		2,318	14.12
Turnout		16,422	
Democratic hold			

=== 2022 ===
Texas general election, 2022: Senate District 15
Party	Candidate	Votes	%	±%
Democratic	John Whitmire	159,125	65.33	+0.15
Republican	George Brian Vachris	84,437	34.67	+2.50
Turnout		243,562		
Democratic hold				

=== 2018 ===
Texas general election, 2018: Senate District 15
Party	Candidate	Votes	%	±%
Democratic	John Whitmire	153,016	65.18	+6.01
Republican	Randy Orr	75,518	32.17	−6.31
Libertarian	Gilberto "Gil" Velasquez, Jr.	6,229	2.65	+0.30
Turnout		234,763		
Democratic hold				

=== 2014 ===
Texas general election, 2014: Senate District 15
Party	Candidate	Votes	%	±%
Democratic	John Whitmire	74,192	59.17	−3.17
Republican	Ron Hale	48,249	38.48	+0.72
Libertarian	Gilberto Velasquez, Jr.	2,947	2.35	+2.35
Majority		25,943	20.69	−3.99
Turnout		125,388		−42.45
Democratic hold				

=== 2012 ===
Texas general election, 2012: Senate District 15
Party	Candidate	Votes	%	±%
Democratic	John Whitmire	135,822	62.34	+3.06
Republican	Bill Walker	82,038	37.66	−3.06
Majority		53,784	24.68	+6.12
Turnout		217,860		+67.51
Democratic hold				

=== 2010 ===
Texas general election, 2010: Senate District 15
Party	Candidate	Votes	%	±%
Democratic	John Whitmire	77,096	59.28	−3.73
Republican	Bill Walker	52,959	40.72	+3.73
Majority		24,137	18.56	−7.46
Turnout		130,055		+44.05
Democratic hold				

=== 2006 ===
Texas general election, 2006: Senate District 15
Party	Candidate	Votes	%	±%
Democratic	John Whitmire	56,884	63.01	+2.64
Republican	Angel DeLaRosa	33,396	36.99	−2.64
Majority		23,488	26.02	+5.28
Turnout		90,280		−12.74
Democratic hold				

=== 2002 ===
Texas general election, 2002: Senate District 15
Party	Candidate	Votes	%	±%
Democratic	John Whitmire	62,458	60.37	−4.69
Republican	Michael P. Wolfe	41,003	39.63	+4.69
Majority		21,455	20.71	−9.38
Turnout		103,461		−29.76
Democratic hold				

Republican Party Primary Election, 2002: Senate District 15
Candidate		Votes	%	±
✓	Michael P. Wolfe	8,314	83.04	
	Sam Texas	1,698	16.96	
Turnout		12,713		

=== 2000 ===
Texas general election, 2000: Senate District 15
Party	Candidate	Votes	%	±%
Democratic	John Whitmire	95,826	65.06	+3.01
Republican	Warren A. Lawless	51,465	34.94	−3.01
Majority		44,361	30.12	+6.02
Turnout		147,291		+12.65
Democratic hold				

=== 1996 ===
Texas general election, 1996: Senate District 15
Party	Candidate	Votes	%	±%
Democratic	John Whitmire	81,134	62.05	−37.95
Republican	Tom Kelly	49,619	37.95	+37.95
Majority		31,515	24.10	−75.90
Turnout		130,753		+97.09
Democratic hold				

Republican Party Primary Election, 1992: Senate District 15
Candidate		Votes	%	±
✓	Tom Kelly	8,608	67.71	
	David D. Schein	4,105	32.29	
Turnout		12,713		

=== 1994 ===
Texas general election, 1994: Senate District 15
Party	Candidate	Votes	%	±%
Democratic	John Whitmire	66,341	100.00	+30.12
Majority		66,341	100.00	+55.79
Turnout		66,341		−33.62
Democratic hold				

=== 1992 ===
Texas general election, 1992: Senate District 15
Party	Candidate	Votes	%	±%
Democratic	John Whitmire	69,844	69.88	
Republican	Thomas V. Kelly	25,660	25.67	
Libertarian	George Hollenback	4,438	4.44	
Majority		44,184	44.21	
Turnout		99,942		
Democratic hold				

Democratic Party Primary Runoff Election, 1992: Senate District 15
Candidate		Votes	%	±
✓	John Whitmire	16,938	52.39	
	Roman O. Martinez	15,390	47.61	
Turnout		32,328		

Democratic Party Primary Election, 1992: Senate District 15
Candidate		Votes	%	±
✓	Roman O. Martinez	15,575	48.87	
✓	John Whitmire	14,707	46.14	
	David Alley	1,587	4.97	
Turnout		31,869		

== District officeholders ==
Legislature	Senator, District 15	Counties in District
1	Edward Burleson	Bastrop, Travis.
2	Edward Burleson	Bastrop, Travis.
3	Wilds K. Cooke	Brazos, Leon, Limestone, Navarro, Robertson.
4	Jesse Grimes	Grimes, Montgomery, Walker.
5	William C. Edwards	Jasper, Newton, Sabine, San Augustine.
6	James M. Burroughs	Jasper, Newton, Sabine, San Augustine.
7	James M. Burroughs	Jasper, Newton, Sabine, San Augustine.
8	Franklin Barlow Sexton; Henry C. Wallace	Jasper, Newton, Sabine, San Augustine.
9	J. J. Dickson; William D. Lair	Collin, Grayson.
10	James W. Throckmorton	Collin, Grayson.
11	John K. Bumpass	Collin, Grayson.
12	John S. Mills	Grimes, Madison, Walker.
13	Edward T. Randle	Grimes, Madison, Walker.
14	Edward T. Randle	Grimes, Madison, San Jacinto, Walker.
15	Thomas J. McCulloch	Brazos, Leon, Robertson.
16	Thomas J. McCulloch	Brazos, Leon, Robertson.
17	John Nathaniel Henderson	Brazos, Leon, Robertson.
18	Lochlin Johnson Farrar	Freestone, Limestone, Navarro.
19	Lochlin Johnson Farrar	Freestone, Limestone, Navarro.
20	Eldred James Simkins	Freestone, Limestone, Navarro.
21	Eldred James Simkins	Freestone, Limestone, Navarro.
22	Eldred James Simkins	Freestone, Limestone, Navarro.
23	William P. McComb	Grimes, Leon, Madison, Montgomery, Polk, San Jacinto, Walker.
24	William P. McComb	Grimes, Leon, Madison, Montgomery, Polk, San Jacinto, Walker.
25	George D. Neal	Grimes, Leon, Madison, Montgomery, Polk, San Jacinto, Walker.
26	George D. Neal	Grimes, Leon, Madison, Montgomery, Polk, San Jacinto, Walker.
27	George D. Neal	Grimes, Leon, Madison, Montgomery, Polk, San Jacinto, Walker.
28	Alfred W. Morris	Grimes, Leon, Madison, Montgomery, Polk, San Jacinto, Walker.
29	McDonald J. Meachum	Grimes, Leon, Madison, Montgomery, Polk, San Jacinto, Walker.
30	McDonald J. Meachum	Grimes, Leon, Madison, Montgomery, Polk, San Jacinto, Walker.
31	McDonald J. Meachum	Grimes, Leon, Madison, Montgomery, Polk, San Jacinto, Walker.
32	McDonald J. Meachum	Grimes, Leon, Madison, Montgomery, Polk, San Jacinto, Walker.
33	Clinton W. Nugent	Grimes, Leon, Madison, Montgomery, Polk, San Jacinto, Walker.
34	Clinton W. Nugent	Grimes, Leon, Madison, Montgomery, Polk, San Jacinto, Walker.
35	William L. Dean	Grimes, Leon, Madison, Montgomery, Polk, San Jacinto, Walker.
36	William L. Dean	Grimes, Leon, Madison, Montgomery, Polk, San Jacinto, Walker.
37	Henry L. Lewis	Grimes, Leon, Madison, Montgomery, Polk, San Jacinto, Walker.
38	Henry L. Lewis	Grimes, Leon, Madison, Montgomery, Polk, San Jacinto, Walker.
39	Gus Russek	Austin, Colorado, Fayette, Lavaca, Waller.
40	Gus Russek	Austin, Colorado, Fayette, Lavaca, Waller.
41	Gus Russek	Austin, Colorado, Fayette, Lavaca, Waller.
42	Gus Russek	Austin, Colorado, Fayette, Lavaca, Waller.
43	Gus Russek	Austin, Colorado, Fayette, Lavaca, Waller.
44	Louis J. Sulak	Austin, Colorado, Fayette, Lavaca, Waller.
45	Louis J. Sulak	Austin, Colorado, Fayette, Lavaca, Waller.
46	Louis J. Sulak	Austin, Colorado, Fayette, Lavaca, Waller.
47	Louis J. Sulak	Austin, Colorado, Fayette, Lavaca, Waller.
48	Louis J. Sulak	Austin, Colorado, Fayette, Lavaca, Waller.
49	Louis J. Sulak	Austin, Colorado, Fayette, Lavaca, Waller.
50	Gus J. Strauss	Austin, Colorado, Fayette, Lavaca, Waller.
51	Gus J. Strauss	Austin, Colorado, Fayette, Lavaca, Waller.
52	Gus J. Strauss	Austin, Colorado, Fayette, Lavaca, Waller.
53	Gus J. Strauss	Austin, Colorado, Fayette, Lavaca, Lee, Waller, Wharton.
54	Gus J. Strauss	Austin, Colorado, Fayette, Lavaca, Lee, Waller, Wharton.
55	Culp Krueger	Austin, Colorado, Fayette, Lavaca, Lee, Waller, Wharton.
56	Culp Krueger	Austin, Colorado, Fayette, Lavaca, Lee, Waller, Wharton.
57	Culp Krueger	Austin, Colorado, Fayette, Lavaca, Lee, Waller, Wharton.
58	Culp Krueger	Austin, Colorado, Fayette, Lavaca, Matagorda, Washington, Wharton.
59	Culp Krueger	Austin, Colorado, Fayette, Lavaca, Matagorda, Washington, Wharton.
60	Henry Grover	Portion of Harris.
61	Henry Grover	Portion of Harris.
62	Henry Grover	Portion of Harris.
63	Jack C. Ogg	Portion of Harris.
64	Jack C. Ogg	Portion of Harris.
65	Jack C. Ogg	Portion of Harris.
66	Jack C. Ogg	Portion of Harris.
67	Jack C. Ogg	Portion of Harris.
68	John Whitmire	Portion of Harris.
69	John Whitmire	Portion of Harris.
70	John Whitmire	Portion of Harris.
71	John Whitmire	Portion of Harris.
72	John Whitmire	Portion of Harris.
73	John Whitmire	Portion of Harris.
74	John Whitmire	Portion of Harris.
75	John Whitmire	Portion of Harris.
76	John Whitmire	Portion of Harris.
77	John Whitmire	Portion of Harris.
78	John Whitmire	Portion of Harris.
79	John Whitmire	Portion of Harris.
80	John Whitmire	Portion of Harris.
81	John Whitmire	Portion of Harris.
82	John Whitmire	Portion of Harris.
83	John Whitmire	Portion of Harris.
84	John Whitmire	Portion of Harris.
85	John Whitmire	Portion of Harris.
86	John Whitmire	Portion of Harris.
87	John Whitmire	Portion of Harris.
88	John Whitmire; Molly Cook	Portion of Harris.
89	Molly Cook	Portion of Harris.
