= John Whitmire =

Mayor of Houston since 2024

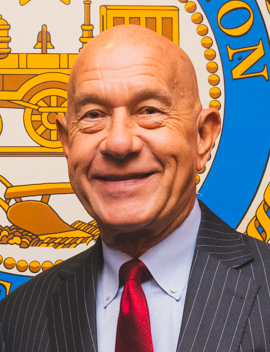
- Whitmire in 2025

63rd Mayor of Houston
- Incumbent
- Assumed office January 2, 2024
- Preceded by: Sylvester Turner

Member of the Texas Senate from the 15th district
- In office January 11, 1983 – December 31, 2023
- Preceded by: Jack Ogg
- Succeeded by: Molly Cook

Member of the Texas House of Representatives from the 82nd district
- In office January 9, 1973 – January 11, 1983
- Preceded by: William S. Heatly
- Succeeded by: Nolan Robnett

Personal details
- Born: John Harris Whitmire; August 13, 1949 (age 77) Hillsboro, Texas, U.S.
- Party: Democratic
- Spouse: Rebecca Dalby (m. 1976, divorced)
- Children: 2
- Relatives: Kathy Whitmire (sister-in-law)
- Education: University of Houston (BA)
- Website: Office website Campaign website

John Harris Whitmire (born August 13, 1949) is an American attorney and politician who has served as the 63rd mayor of Houston, Texas, since 2024. Whitmire was previously a Democratic member of the Texas House of Representatives from 1973 until 1983, and the Texas State Senate from 1983 to 2023. In the state senate, he represented District 15, which included much of northern Houston.

In November 2021, Whitmire announced his candidacy for mayor of Houston in the 2023 election. In November 2023, he advanced to a runoff with Representative Sheila Jackson Lee. He won the runoff by a wide margin on December 9, 2023.

== Early life and education ==
Whitmire was born in Hillsboro, Texas, north of Waco, to James Madison Whitmire, the Hill County clerk, and the former Ruth Marie Harris, a nurse. His parents divorced when he was seven years old, and the family moved several times, facing difficult financial circumstances.

In his early teenage years, he moved to North Houston and attended Waltrip High School. Whitmire attended college at the University of Houston to study political science while paying for his education by working for the Texas State Welfare Department, where he interviewed food stamp recipients for compliance.

== Texas House of Representatives (1973–1983) ==
Under pressure from the Federal courts, the 1971 legislature drew up Texas's first single-member district plan for the House of Representatives. Whitmire's political science professor Richard Murray was the one to inspire him to run for office as he illustrated the newly drawn district lines that encompassed Whitmire's neighborhood. Whitmire won the primary following a runoff election and easily defeated his Republican opponent. His father provided him with a $5,000 loan for his campaign funds.

Whitmire served in the Texas House with colleagues Gene Green, Craig Washington, and Mickey Leland and eventually finished his undergraduate degree. In his early years, he was not seen as a particularly influential legislator, and he was criticized by Texas Monthly magazine for his low impact. He began his law studies at the Bates College of Law (now the University of Houston Law Center), then passed the bar in 1981 while still serving in the House. He did not graduate, as state law at the time allowed legislators entrance to the bar without a full J.D.

== Texas Senate (1983–2023) ==
In 1982, Senator Jack Ogg vacated his seat to pursue the Attorney General position. Whitmire captured the Senate District 15 seat, taking office in 1983.

Whitmire won reelection to the state Senate in the general election held on November 6, 2018. With 152,728 votes (65.2 percent), he defeated the Republican candidate, Randy Orr, who polled 75,423 (32.2 percent). Another 6,266 votes (2.7 percent) went to the Libertarian choice, Gilberto "Gil" Velasquez Jr. He resigned effectively from the State Senate on December 31, 2023, after his election as Mayor of Houston.

Whitmire served as the acting governor of Texas for a single day in 1993 as part of the "Governor for a Day" tradition.

=== Criminal justice ===
In 1993, Whitmire was appointed by Lieutenant Governor Bob Bullock as Chair of the Senate Criminal Justice Committee, where he oversaw reforms to the penal code and increased construction of prisons, to a generally favorable reception. Whitmire remained the chair as of the eighty-seventh Texas Legislature.

==== Freeing the Tulia 13 ====
Whitmire passed legislation to free the Texans who were imprisoned as a result of the Tulia drug raid. That incident resulted in the conviction of 38 Texans based on the testimony of one individual who has since been indicted and arrested for perjury. The legislation allowed the judge to release the prisoners on bond pending the decision of the Court of Criminal Appeals. On June 10, 2003, the Tulia defendants were freed on bond as provided for in Whitmire's legislation. They were later pardoned by the Governor.

==== End to special last meals ====
Whitmire was angered by convicted murderer Lawrence Russell Brewer's refusal to eat the expensive last meal he ordered prior to his September 21, 2011, execution. Whitmire said that this was Brewer's attempt to "make a mockery out of the process." The senator contacted the Texas Department of Criminal Justice and asked the agency to end the practice of last meal requests or he would get the State Legislature to pass a bill doing so. The agency replied that last meal requests were accommodated "within reason" from food available in the prison kitchen, but it agreed to end the practice immediately at Whitmire's insistence.

=== Redistricting ===
In 2003, Whitmire was one of the "Texas Eleven", a group of Democrats who fled the state for New Mexico in a quorum-busting effort aimed at preventing the passage of redistricting legislation that would have benefited Texas Republicans. He ultimately returned to the legislature, creating a quorum and undoing the efforts of the rest of the Texas Eleven. Whitmire was strongly criticized by Democrats and praised by some Republicans, who were able to redraw the maps.

== Mayor of Houston (2024–present) ==
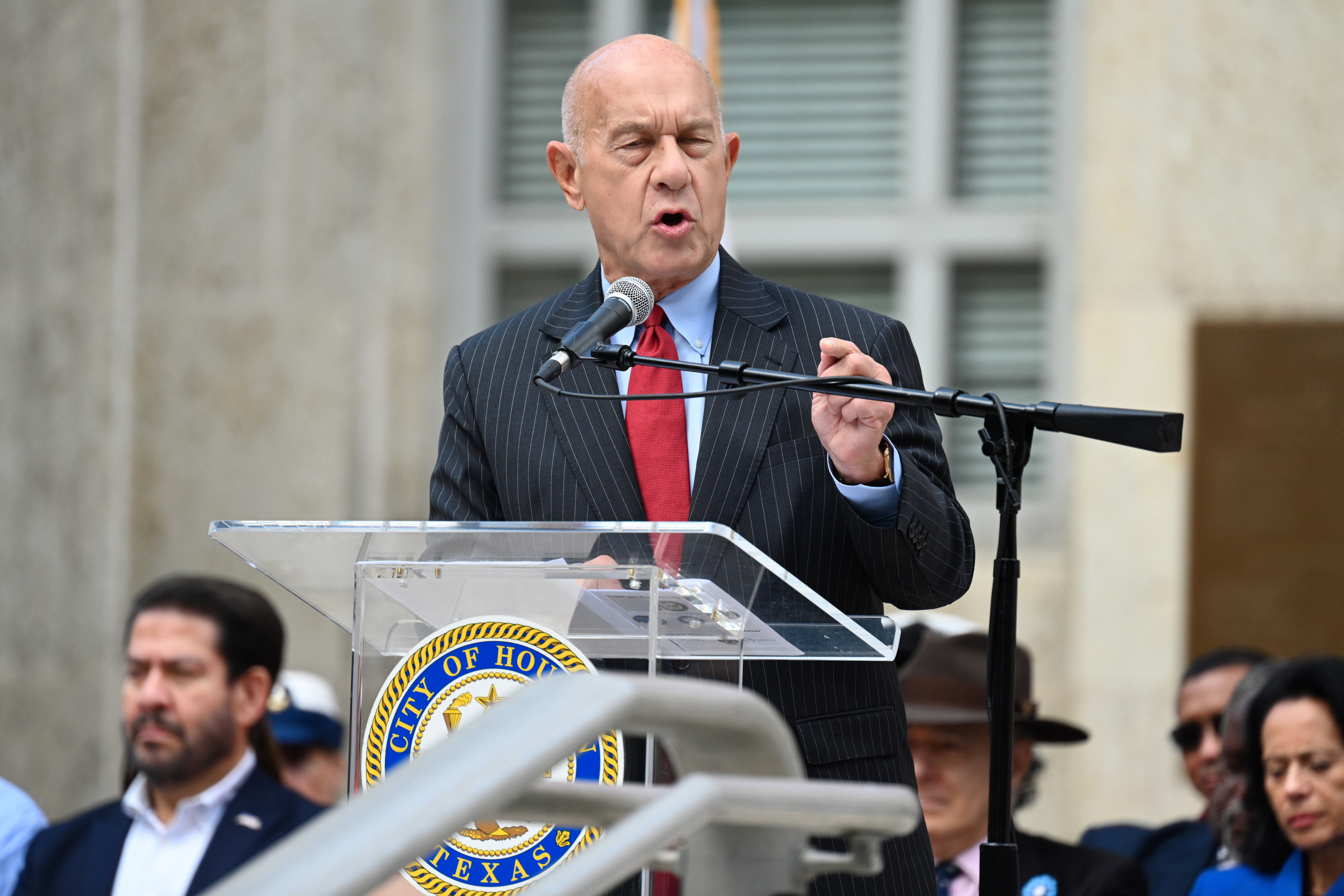
Whitmire speaking at a Veterans Day ceremony, 2024

=== 2023 election ===
In November 2021, Whitmire announced his candidacy in the 2023 Houston mayoral election to succeed term-limited Mayor Sylvester Turner. He first considered a mayoral bid in the 1990s and was encouraged by Houston Police Chief Art Acevedo to run in the 2023 race. Though being a crowded field, The New York Times described the race as a de facto two-person contest between Whitmire and U.S. Representative Sheila Jackson Lee. Both were Democrats (Note: Mayoral elections in Houston are officially nonpartisan.) and long-time fixtures in Houston politics. His campaign focused on public safety with a pledge to bring 200 troopers from the Texas Department of Public Safety to assist the Houston Police Department. With a moderate message, Whitmire positioned himself to appeal to centrist and Republican voters, while Jackson Lee was considered the more progressive candidate.

Whitmire held a fundraising advantage over Jackson Lee, raising over twice as much as she did between July and late September 2023; he outspent her five-to-one in the same time period. In the general election, Whitmire received about 43% of the vote, with Jackson Lee receiving 36%. With both candidates below the 50% plus one threshold, a runoff was held between Whitmire and Jackson Lee on December 9, 2023. He was projected to be the winner following a commanding early lead.

=== Tenure ===
Whitmire took office as mayor on January 1, 2024. Sworn in at the age of 74, he became the oldest mayor of Houston in over a century.

==== Personnel ====
Early on in his mayorship, Whitmire ordered personnel changes for the city, including new appointments of several department heads, such as the finance department, planning department, neighborhoods department, airport system, and Metro and transportation planning authority. In his first 100 days in office, Whitmire appointed seven department heads, which is about a one-third turnover in the city's leadership.

As of June 3, 2024, about 12 department heads and senior officials had resigned or left Whitmire's administration.

==== Policing ====
Since 2016, the Houston Police Department has suspended 264,000 criminal cases using the justification of "lack of personnel." In March 2024, Whitmire introduced a five-person committee to investigate the case suspensions. The situation has been considered a scandal and resulted in the abrupt May 2024 resignation of Interim Police Chief Troy Finner, whom Whitmire temporarily replaced with Larry Satterwhite. There is now a group of 100 investigators assigned to review the suspended reports. On June 11, 2024, Whitmire said the report of the committee he delegated to investigate the matter would be released the next week. The report was released on July 31, 2024, a week after the former police chief raised concerns of a cover-up. A year later, the city was unable to offer progress updates on addressing the problems leading to the scandal.

==== Firefighter deal ====
Whitmire has proposed a $1.5 billion deal to end the eight-year-old stalemate between the city and the fire fighter's union. The deal includes $650 million in backpay and a 10% raise in 2024, with the possibility of another 6% increase over the proceeding four years.

==== Budget ====
Upon entering office, Whitmire inherited a $160 million budget shortfall. Whitmire has said he has intentions to propose an increase in the property tax cap, which would need voter approval. But would not do so until waste, fraud and abuse were removed from the City's budget. An efficiency study was commissioned and was completed by the accounting firm Ernst & Young for FY2025. The recommendations made by Ernst & Young were implemented in the budget passed by the City Council with a vote of 14-3. Increasing the cap would mean a $15 increase in property taxes per month (or $180 a year) for the average tax payer. Whitmire proposed a $6.7 billion budget for the 2025 fiscal year, a 7% increase from the year before. Despite speculation, the proposal did not have an increase in property taxes or fees; instead, remaining federal funds for the COVID-19 pandemic will be used to close the deficit. About $1.7 billion of the budget goes to public safety efforts, with the Houston Police Department taking roughly 15% of the budget, a 3.6% increase from the prior year. The proposal would include 200 more police officers and about 100 more full-time employees for the fire department.

==== 2024 storm response and relationship with Lina Hidalgo ====
In April 2024, Harris County Judge Lina Hidalgo reported to the media that she and Whitmire had not met despite her attempts to reach out to Whitmire and his office several times. Whitmire's office confirmed that he had not met with Hidalgo and stated Whitmire "doesn't have time for games or meet and greets." Hidalgo said the lack of communication could damage cooperation between Harris County and the City of Houston in coordinating hurricane preparation. Whitmire said he had met with several county commissioners on hurricane preparedness and indicated he would meet with Hidalgo when appropriate.

In May 2024, a severe storm effected the Houston area causing seven deaths and nearly a million to lose electricity. Whitmire and Hidalgo held a joint press conference. However, they exchanged passive aggressive remarks during the conference. When Whitmire tried to allow Lesley Briones, a commissioner for Harris County precinct 4, to speak, Hidalgo cut him off saying she had promised that she would repeat her remarks in Spanish after Whitmire was done speaking and that she "didn't feel comfortable giving special treatment" to Briones. Whitmire then said "I'm glad I made the approval list," and Hidalgo retorted, "Mayor, this is a disaster. This is not the time." Similarly, Hidalgo cut him off when he tried to allow Representative Jolanda Jones to speak. The two then released separate news releases and held separate press conferences.

In June 2024, Whitmire came under scrutiny following a Facebook comment he made under a post by Hidalgo showing her and her fiancé at their bridal shower. Whitmire wrote, in reference to her fiancé, "Wonderful. He sure looks like a nerd." The comment was subsequently deleted. Hidalgo described the comment as "cruel". A spokesperson for Whitmire stated, "Whitmire was having a lighthearted moment and meant no harm."

==== Infrastructure and mobility ====
In December 2023, Houston Public Works and City Council District H completed the installation of safety improvements along Houston Avenue, south of Washington Avenue. These improvements included the construction of a center median with turn lanes and pedestrian refuge island, and reduction of the road from five lanes to four lanes. This sparked controversy amongst residents, most notably, Trinity Lutheran Church located in Downtown Houston. The cost of the project was $100,000. As one of his first actions as Mayor, Whitmire ordered Houston Public Works to remove the safety improvements and return Houston Avenue to five lanes. Houston Public Works spent $230,000 to reverse the safety improvements and an additional $500,000 to repave the road.

Transit advocates and others (including the editorial board of the Houston Chronicle) have criticized Whitmire for his administration's removal of signal priority from segments of the METRORail Red Line.

==== Bike safety infrastructure opposition ====
Shortly after taking office, Whitmire spoke out against "anti-car activists" at the city seeking to reduce vehicle lanes while increasing density and walkability in alignment with national trends and local demand.

In March 2025, Whitmire's office directed additional safety infrastructure removals, including the removal of physical barriers separating bike lanes from car lanes on Heights Blvd south of Interstate 10, as well as a raised crosswalk across Westheimer Rd near Montrose Blvd.

One week later, he also directed the city to remove the $2 million bi-directional bike lane on Austin St. in Midtown, planning to replace it with a single direction shared lane marking (mixed with car traffic). The office stated that this was in response to community comment, however no public comment hearing was held. Despite the city's initial claims that the removal was initiated due to drainage concerns, text messages received through open records request revealed that Whitmire sought to remove the bike lanes. The removal is estimated to cost $2.5 million.

== Personal life ==
Whitmire was previously married to Rebecca "Becki" Dalby.

Whitmire's brother, James M. Whitmire, was married from 1970 until his death in 1976 to Kathy Niederhofer, who was mayor of Houston from 1982 to 1992.

== Electoral history ==
Houston Mayoral Runoff Election, 2023
Party	Candidate	Votes	%
Independent	John Whitmire	129,495	64.42
Independent	Sheila Jackson Lee	71,523	35.58
Total votes		201,018	100.0

Houston Mayoral General Election, 2023
Party	Candidate	Votes	%
Independent	John Whitmire	107,410	42.50
Independent	Sheila Jackson Lee	90,093	35.64
Independent	Gilbert Garcia	18,220	7.21
Independent	Jack Christie	17,364	6.87
Independent	Lee Kaplan	6,645	2.63
Independent	Robert Gallegos	2,679	1.06
Independent	M.J. Khan	2,478	0.98
Independent	Annie Garcia	1,979	0.78
Independent	Julian Martinez	1,813	0.72
Independent	Roy Vasquez	1,083	0.43
Independent	M. Griffin	674	0.27
Independent	Kathy Lee Tatum	532	0.21
Independent	David Lowy	368	0.15
Independent	Chanel Mbala	356	0.14
Independent	Naoufal Houjami	352	0.14
Independent	Gaylon Caldwell	331	0.13
Independent	B. Ivy	287	0.11
Independent	Robin Williams	95	0.04
Total votes		252,759	100.0

Texas general election, 2022: Senate District 15
Party	Candidate	Votes	%
Democratic	John Whitmire (incumbent)	159,125	65.33
Republican	George Vachris	84,437	34.67
Total votes		243,562	100.0
Democratic hold			

Texas general election, 2018: Senate District 15
Party	Candidate	Votes	%
Democratic	John Whitmire (incumbent)	153,016	65.18
Republican	Randy Orr	75,518	32.17
Libertarian	Gilberto "Gil" Velasquez, Jr.	6,229	2.65
Total votes		234,763	100.0
Democratic hold			

Texas general election, 2014: Senate District 15
Party	Candidate	Votes	%
Democratic	John Whitmire (incumbent)	74,192	59.17
Republican	Ron Hale	48,249	38.48
Libertarian	Gilberto Velasquez, Jr.	2,947	2.35
Total votes		125,388	100.0
Democratic hold			

Democratic primary, 2014: Senate District 15
Party	Candidate	Votes	%
Democratic	John Whitmire (incumbent)	9,756	75.12
Democratic	Damian LaCroix	3,232	24.88
Total votes		12,988	100.0

Texas general election, 2012: Senate District 15
Party	Candidate	Votes	%
Democratic	John Whitmire (incumbent)	135,822	62.34
Republican	Bill Walker	82,038	37.66
Total votes		217,860	100.0
Democratic hold			

Texas general election, 2010: Senate District 15
Party	Candidate	Votes	%
Democratic	John Whitmire (incumbent)	77,096	59.28
Republican	Bill Walker	52,959	40.72
Total votes		130,055	100.0
Democratic hold			

Texas general election, 2006: Senate District 15
Party	Candidate	Votes	%
Democratic	John Whitmire (incumbent)	56,884	63.01
Republican	Angel DeLaRosa	33,396	36.99
Total votes		90,280	100.0
Democratic hold			

Texas general election, 2002: Senate District 15
Party	Candidate	Votes	%
Democratic	John Whitmire (incumbent)	62,458	60.37
Republican	Michael P. Wolfe	41,003	39.63
Total votes		103,461	100.0
Democratic hold			

Texas general election, 2000: Senate District 15
Party	Candidate	Votes	%
Democratic	John Whitmire (incumbent)	95,826	65.06
Republican	Warren A. Lawless	51,465	34.94
Total votes		147,291	100.0
Democratic hold			

Texas general election, 1996: Senate District 15
Party	Candidate	Votes	%
Democratic	John Whitmire (incumbent)	81,134	62.05
Republican	Thomas V. Kelly	49,619	37.95
Total votes		130,753	100.0
Democratic hold			

Texas general election, 1994: Senate District 15
Party	Candidate	Votes	%
Democratic	John Whitmire (incumbent)	66,341	100.00
Total votes		66,341	100.0
Democratic hold			

Texas general election, 1992: Senate District 15
Party	Candidate	Votes	%
Democratic	John Whitmire (incumbent)	69,844	69.88
Republican	Thomas V. Kelly	25,660	25.67
Libertarian	George Hollenback	4,438	4.44
Total votes		99,942	100.0
Democratic hold			

Democratic primary runoff, 1992: Senate District 15
Party	Candidate	Votes	%
Democratic	John Whitmire (incumbent)	16,938	52.39
Democratic	Roman O. Martinez	15,390	47.61
Total votes		32,328	100.0

Democratic primary, 1992: Senate District 15
Party	Candidate	Votes	%
Democratic	Roman O. Martinez	15,575	48.87
Democratic	John Whitmire (incumbent)	14,707	46.14
Democratic	David Alley	1,587	4.97
Total votes		31,869	100.0

== Notes ==
Texas House of Representatives
Preceded by William S. Heatly	Member of the Texas House of Representatives from the 82nd district 1973–1983	Succeeded by Nolan Robnett
Texas Senate
Preceded by Jack Ogg	Member of the Texas Senate from the 15th district 1983–2023	Succeeded by Molly Cook
Political offices
Preceded by Sylvester Turner	Mayor of Houston; 2024–present	Incumbent
