= Molly Cook =

American registered nurse and politician

- Cook in 2025

Member of the Texas Senate from the 15th district
- Incumbent
- Assumed office May 16, 2024
- Preceded by: John Whitmire

Personal details
- Born: June 6, 1991 (age 35) Houston, Texas, U.S.
- Party: Democratic
- Education: University of Texas at Austin (BSN); Johns Hopkins University (MPH, MSN)
- Website: Office website Campaign website

Molly Cook (born June 6, 1991) is an American registered nurse and politician who is a member of the Texas Senate for the 15th district. A Democrat, she was elected in a May special election to fill the vacancy from John Whitmire resigning to become Mayor of Houston. Cook is openly bisexual, and her win in the May special election was the first time an openly LGBTQ+ person was elected to the Texas Senate. She is also the first woman to represent the 15th district of the Texas Senate.

== Early life and education ==
Cook was born in Houston, Texas. She holds a Bachelor of Science in Nursing from the University of Texas at Austin as well as a Master of Public Health and Master's of Science in Nursing from Johns Hopkins University.

== Political career ==
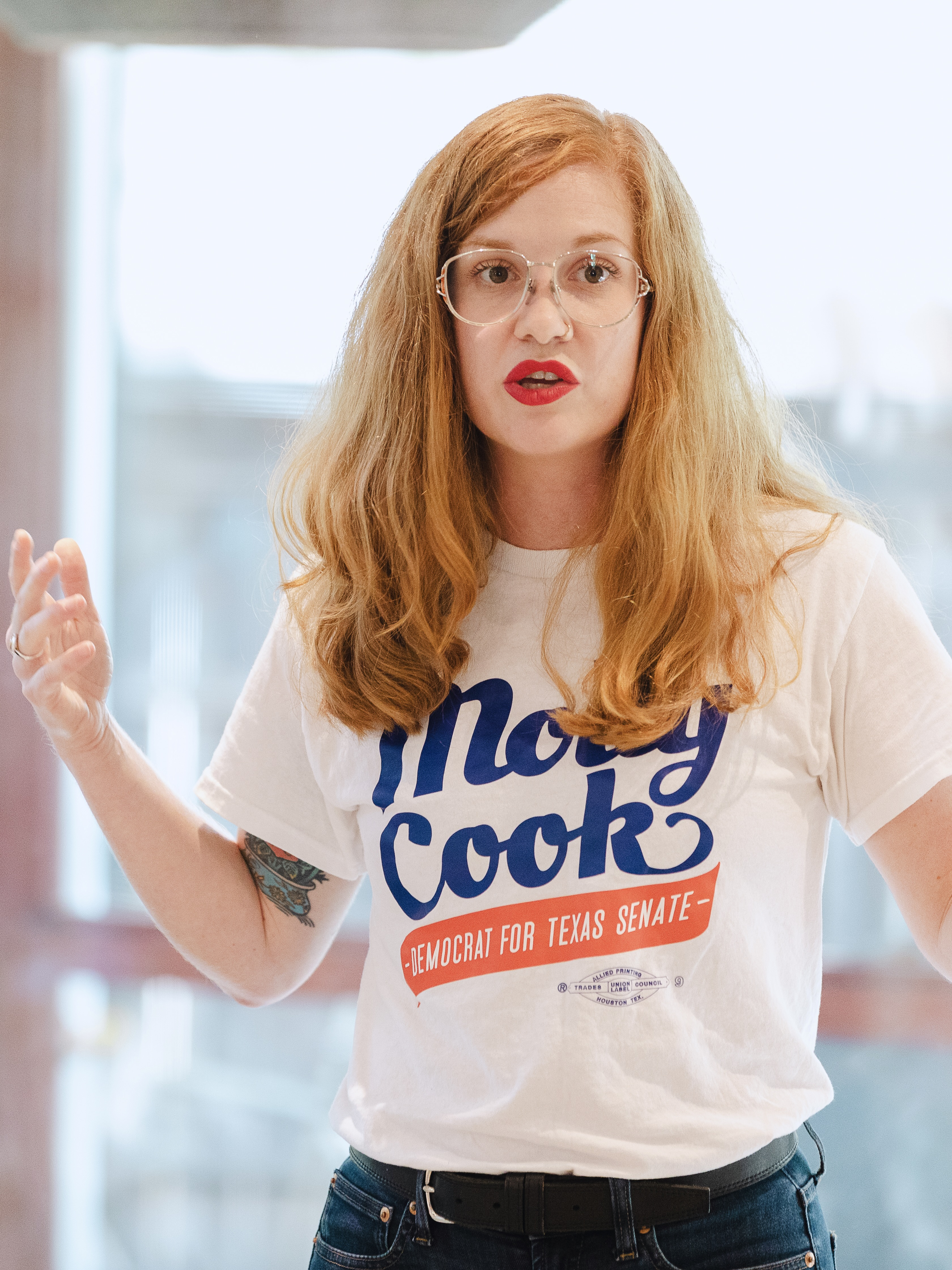
Cook campaigning in Austin in 2023

Cook first ran for the Texas Senate against Whitmire in the Democratic primary election in 2022, positioning herself as a more progressive option. She lost with 42% of the vote in the primary, Whitmire's closest margin since the early 1990s.

Cook ran again in 2024, both in the general election for the term beginning January 14, 2025, and in the special election to fill the vacancy caused by Whitmire's election to serve as Mayor of Houston. On March 5, 2024, she advanced from the Democratic primary to a runoff with State Representative Jarvis Johnson. She then won the May 4 special election to fill the remainder of Whitmire's unexpired term. On May 28, she went on to narrowly win the Democratic primary runoff to advance to the general election, where she defeated Republican candidate Joseph L. Trahan with 62% of the vote.

== Electoral history ==
2024 general election: Senate District 15
Party	Candidate	Votes	%
Democratic	Molly Cook (incumbent)	199,367	61.8
Republican	Joseph L. Trahan	123,081	38.2
Total votes		322,448	100.0

2024 Democratic primary: Senate District 15
Party	Candidate	Votes	%
Democratic	Jarvis Johnson	17,953	36.2
Democratic	Molly Cook (incumbent)	10,213	20.6
Democratic	Todd Litton	7,859	15.8
Democratic	Michelle Bonton	5,291	10.7
Democratic	Alberto Cardenas Jr	5,196	10.5
Democratic	Karthik Soora	3,091	6.2
Total votes		49,603	100.0

2024 special general election: Senate District 15
Party	Candidate	Votes	%
Democratic	Molly Cook	9,370	57.1
Democratic	Jarvis Johnson	7,052	42.9
Total votes		16,422	100.0

2022 Democratic primary: Senate District 15
Party	Candidate	Votes	%
Democratic	John Whitmire (incumbent)	26,286	58.4
Democratic	Molly Cook	18,695	41.6
Total votes		44,981	100.0

== Personal life ==
Cook supports abortion, saying, “In 2014, I had an abortion. Abortion is a medical procedure and a personal choice. Our Legislature’s role is to make sure abortions are safe, accessible and stigma-free for every Texan".

She is openly bisexual.

Texas Senate
Preceded by John Whitmire	Member of the Texas Senate from the 15th district 2024–present	Incumbent
