= Jace Yarbrough =

American politician

- Yarbrough in 2014

Member-elect of the U.S. House of Representatives from Texas's 32nd district
- Assuming office January 3, 2027
- Succeeding: Julie Johnson (redistricted)

Personal details
- Born: Jace Randall Yarbrough; August 1986 (age 40) Stephenville, Texas, U.S.
- Party: Republican
- Children: 5
- Education: University of Texas, Austin (BA); Stanford University (JD)
- Website: Campaign website

Jace Randall Yarbrough (born August 1986) is an American politician and attorney who is the U.S. representative-elect for Texas's 32nd congressional district. He is a Republican. He previously ran for the Texas Senate's 30th district in 2024, but lost in the Republican primary.

== Early life and education ==
Jace Randall Yarbrough was born in August 1986. He was raised in Tuscola, Texas, and attended the University of Texas at Austin. He attended law school at Stanford University.

== Career ==
He served as a developmental engineer in the U.S. Air Force.

=== 2024 Texas state Senate campaign ===
Yarbrough ran for the open seat in Texas Senate District 30 in 2024, which was vacated by retiring Senator Drew Springer. He received approximately 33% of the vote in the March Republican primary and advanced to a May runoff against Brent Hagenbuch, who won the nomination.

== U.S. House of Representatives ==
In 2026, Yarbrough ran for the United States House of Representatives in Texas's redrawn 32nd district. He defeated businessman Ryan Binkley in the Republican primary for the seat, and Democrat Dan Barrios in the general election.

=== Elections ===
2026 election in Texas's 32nd congressional district
Party	Candidate	Votes	%
Republican	Jace Yarbrough	142,834	51.5
Democratic	Dan Barrios	134,781	48.5
Total votes		277,615	100.0
Republican gain from Democratic			

== Political positions ==
=== Immigration ===
Following his election to Congress, Yarbrough told Fox News that he supports "stopping immigration altogether for a time because of how insane [it] has gotten." Yarbrough opposes chain migration.

=== Islam ===
Yarbrough has claimed that Texas is undergoing Islamification. He has denounced sharia, or Islamic law, calling it incompatible with the Constitution and calling for a nationwide ban.

== Personal life ==
Yarbrough founded a Christian school in Denton, Texas. Yarbrough and his wife have 5 children.

U.S. House of Representatives
Preceded by Julie Johnson; Redistricted	Member of the U.S. House of Representatives from Texas's 32nd congressional district Taking office 2027	Elect
