= Charles Schwertner =

American politician

President pro tempore of the Texas Senate
- In office May 29, 2023 – January 14, 2025
- Preceded by: Kelly Hancock
- Succeeded by: Brandon Creighton

Member of the Texas Senate from the 5th district
- Incumbent
- Assumed office January 8, 2013
- Preceded by: Steve Ogden

Member of the Texas House of Representatives from the 20th district
- In office January 11, 2011 – January 8, 2013
- Preceded by: Dan Gattis
- Succeeded by: Marsha Farney

Personal details
- Born: Charles Jeffrey Schwertner; May 29, 1970 (age 56) Tuscaloosa, Alabama, U.S.
- Party: Republican
- Spouse: Belinda
- Education: University of Texas at Austin (BS); University of Texas Medical Branch (MD)
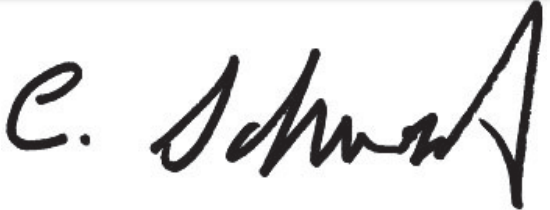
- Signature
- Website: Office website Campaign website

Charles Jeffrey Schwertner (born May 29, 1970) is an American orthopedic surgeon and politician who has represented the 5th district in the Texas Senate since 2013. A member of the Republican Party, he served as president pro tempore of the Texas Senate from 2023 to 2025 and represented the 20th district in the Texas House of Representatives from 2011 to 2013.

Schwertner serves as chairman of the Senate Committee on Business and Commerce. He is also a member of the Senate Committees on Economic Development, Finance, State Affairs, and Disaster Preparedness and Flooding.

== Career ==
Schwertner was first elected to the Texas House of Representatives in 2010. He represented the 20th district in the Texas House from 2011 to 2013. During his first term, he ran for Texas Senate and won the 2012 Texas Senate election with 72 percent of the vote. In 2014, he was re-elected to the Texas Senate and served in the 84th Texas Legislature. He was re-elected to the Senate again in 2018.

In 2021, Senator Schwertner passed SB 3 to substantively reform the Texas power grid in the aftermath of a series of major winter storms that left many Texans without power for several days. These changes included requiring the weatherization of critical power generation, natural gas, and electrical transmission infrastructure; instituting an emergency alert system to notify Texans about extended power outages; and reforming the electric market to increase generation capacity and improve the reliability of the state’s power grid.

In 2021, Senator Schwertner sponsored HB 1927, also known as the "constitutional carry" law. The law allows anyone who can legally own a firearm to carry it – in a holster – in public, for the first time since Reconstruction. HB 1927 doesn't change eligibility for gun ownership; the law still requires that an individual be at least 18 years old and can not have served a sentence for a felony or family violence within the last five years. The law also adds some other misdemeanors to the list for those who want to carry, including assault causing bodily injury, deadly conduct, terroristic threat, and disorderly conduct with a firearm. Texas is now the 20th state to pass a "constitutional carry" law.

In 2025, Schwertner introduced SB 21, a bill creating the Texas Strategic Bitcoin Reserve which allows the State of Texas to purchase digital cryptocurrency as a strategic reserve. After passing the House and the Senate, the bill was signed into law by Governor Greg Abbott on June 22, 2025. Following Arizona and New Hampshire, Texas is the third state to enact legislation creating a bitcoin reserve on the state level.

== Personal life ==
On October 8, 2018, the University of Texas at Austin hired Johnny Sutton, a former federal prosecutor, to investigate claims that Schwertner sent sexually-explicit text messages to a female graduate student and whether such harassment could be a violation of Title IX, a federal civil rights law. The University of Texas ultimately concluded its investigation of Schwertner, stating that the “available evidence does not support a finding" that he had violated university policy or Title IX. In February 2023, Schwertner was arrested for driving while intoxicated in Austin, Texas. The charges were dropped in July the same year.

== Election history ==
=== 2022 ===
Texas general election, 2022: Senate District 5
Party	Candidate	Votes	%	±%
Republican	Charles Schwertner (incumbent)	192,146	71.6	
Libertarian	Tommy Estes	76,317	28.4	
Total votes		268,463	100.0	
Republican hold				

=== 2018 ===
Texas general election, 2018: Senate District 5
Party	Candidate	Votes	%	±%
Republican	Charles Schwertner (incumbent)	182,550	55.34	−9.63
Democratic	Meg Walsh	136,792	41.47	+10.24
Libertarian	Amy Lyons	10,500	3.18	−0.61
Total votes		329,842	100.0	
Republican hold				

=== 2014 ===
Texas general election, 2014: Senate District 5
Party	Candidate	Votes	%	±%
Republican	Charles Schwertner	112,930	64.97	−12.16
Democratic	Joel Shapiro	54,286	31.23	+31.23
Libertarian	Matthew Whittington	6,595	3.79	−19.07
Turnout		173,811		

=== 2012 ===
Texas general election, 2012: Senate District 5
Party	Candidate	Votes	%	±%
Republican	Charles J. Schwertner	182,554	77.14	
Libertarian	Jeffery Fox	54,107	22.86	
Majority		128,447	54.28	
Turnout		236,661		
Republican hold				

=== 2010 ===
Texas general election, 2010: House District 20
Party	Candidate	Votes	%	±%
Republican	Charles J. Schwertner	44,901	82.55	
Libertarian	David Floyd	9,490	17.45	
Majority		35,411	65.1	
Turnout		54,391		
Republican hold				

Texas Senate
Preceded by Kelly Hancock	President pro tempore of the Texas Senate; 2023–2025	Succeeded by Brandon Creighton
