= Texas Senate Bill 412 =

Texas Senate
- Territorial extent: Texas
- Status: In force

Texas Senate Bill 412 is a law that removes the affirmative defense protection from the Texas Penal Code relating to sharing and making available educational materials to minors. The law is meant to protect minors from viewing unsuitable material for minors. Critics claim that the law encourages book banning.

== Legislation ==
Senate Bill 412 was proposed during the 89th Texas Legislative session. The bill, authored by Texas State Senator, Mayes Middleton, is intended to remove affirmative defense protections for state educators with regards to educational and library materials for minors. The bill also affects parents, medical professionals and public libraries. The language of the bill amends the Texas Penal Code regarding the "Sale, Distribution or Display of Harmful Material to Minors" by removing the affirmative defense clause regarding potentially "harmful material" in educational or library settings.

One of the bill's sponsors, State Representative Jared Patterson, believes that the bill is intended to "close a loophole that he believes allows educators, doctors and other to share harmful materials to minors without consequences." SB 412 does not amend the Texas Penal Code in the section on what is considered harmful or inappropriate for minors. This section of the penal code was written after the 1973 Supreme Court of the United States decided on Miller v. California and created a three-prong test for obscenity.

The bill was passed in the Texas Senate on March 19, 2025. It passed in the Texas House in early May with a vote of 92 to 39. It was signed by Governor Greg Abbott on May 19, 2025.

The bill went into effect on September 1, 2025.

== Criticism ==
The ACLU describes the law as "encouraging book banning" by creating a "chilling effect" on educators, librarians, medical professionals and parents Books that could be affected by the law include any book that has "elements of sexuality" such as the Bible, Brave New World, or The Scarlet Letter.
