= Texas's 27th Senate district =

American legislative district

Texas's 27th State Senate district
Senator
Adam Hinojosa; R–Corpus Christi
- Demographics: 8% White; 0.7% Black; 90.7% Hispanic; 0.7% Asian
- Population: 829,476

District 27 of the Texas Senate is a senatorial district that currently serves all of Bee, Cameron, Kenedy, Kleberg, San Patricio, and Willacy counties and portions of Hidalgo and Nueces counties in the U.S. state of Texas.

The current senator from District 27 is Adam Hinojosa.

== Biggest cities in the district ==
District 27 has a population of 786,946 with 524,120 that is at voting age from the 2010 census.

	Name	County	Pop. (Note: Population is based on the number of people in the district in that city, not the overall population of that city)
1	Brownsville	Cameron	175,023
2	Harlingen	Cameron	64,849
3	Pharr	Hidalgo	55,332
4	Weslaco	Hidalgo	35,670
5	San Juan	Hidalgo	33,856

== Election history ==
Election history of District 27 from 1992. (Note: Uncontested primary elections are not shown.)

=== 2024 ===
Texas general election, 2024: Senate District 27
Party	Candidate	Votes	%	±%
Republican	Adam Hinojosa	126,073	49.38	−0.43
Democratic	Morgan LaMantia (Incumbent)	123,305	48.29	−1.90
Green	Hunter Crow	5,956	2.33	+2.33
Majority		2,768	1.08	+0.70
Turnout		255,334	100.00	
Republican gain from Democratic				

=== 2022 ===
Texas general election, 2022: Senate District 27
Party	Candidate	Votes	%	±%
Democratic	Morgan LaMantia	88,037	50.19	−14.62
Republican	Adam Hinojosa	87,378	49.81	+14.62
Majority		659	0.38	−29.24
Turnout		175,415	100.00	
Democratic hold				

=== 2020 ===
Texas general election, 2020: Senate District 27
Party	Candidate	Votes	%	±%
Democratic	Eddie Lucio, Jr. (Incumbent)	134,035	64.81	−35.19
Republican	Vanessa Tijerina	72,768	35.19	+35.19
Majority		61,267	29.62	−70.38
Turnout		206,803		
Democratic hold				

=== 2016 ===
Texas general election, 2016: Senate District 27
Party	Candidate	Votes	%	±%
Democratic	Eddie Lucio, Jr. (Incumbent)	135,945	100.00	0.00
Majority		135,945	100.00	0.00
Turnout		135,945		
Democratic hold				

=== 2012 ===
Texas general election, 2012: Senate District 27
Party	Candidate	Votes	%	±%
Democratic	Eddie Lucio, Jr. (Incumbent)	113,542	100.00	0.00
Majority		113,542	100.00	0.00
Turnout		113,542		
Democratic hold				

=== 2008 ===
Texas general election, 2008: Senate District 27
Party	Candidate	Votes	%	±%
Democratic	Eddie Lucio, Jr. (Incumbent)	111,596	100.00	0.00
Majority		111,596	100.00	0.00
Turnout		111,596		
Democratic hold				

=== 2004 ===
Texas general election, 2004: Senate District 27
Party	Candidate	Votes	%	±%
Democratic	Eddie Lucio, Jr. (Incumbent)	89,984	100.00	0.00
Majority		89,984	100.00	0.00
Turnout		89,984		+46.60
Democratic hold				

=== 2002 ===
Texas general election, 2002: Senate District 27
Party	Candidate	Votes	%	±%
Democratic	Eddie Lucio, Jr. (Incumbent)	61,382	100.00	0.00
Majority		61,382	100.00	0.00
Turnout		61,382		−34.73
Democratic hold				

=== 2000 ===
Texas general election, 2000: Senate District 27
Party	Candidate	Votes	%	±%
Democratic	Eddie Lucio, Jr. (Incumbent)	94,042	100.00	0.00
Majority		94,042	100.00	0.00
Turnout		94,042		+16.30
Democratic hold				

=== 1996 ===
Texas general election, 1996: Senate District 27
Party	Candidate	Votes	%	±%
Democratic	Eddie Lucio, Jr. (Incumbent)	80,865	100.00	+33.27
Majority		80,865	100.00	+66.55
Turnout		80,865		+1.44
Democratic hold				

=== 1994 ===
Texas general election, 1994: Senate District 27
Party	Candidate	Votes	%	±%
Democratic	Eddie Lucio, Jr. (Incumbent)	53,194	66.73	−33.27
Republican	Ismael Moran	26,527	33.27	+33.27
Majority		26,667	33.45	−66.55
Turnout		79,721		−1.53
Democratic hold				

Democratic primary, 1994: Senate District 27
Candidate		Votes	%	±
✓	Eddie Lucio, Jr. (Incumbent)	33,467	70.56	
	Miguel Wise	13,964	29.44	
Majority		19,503	41.12	
Turnout		47,431		

=== 1992 ===
Texas general election, 1992: Senate District 27
Party	Candidate	Votes	%	±%
Democratic	Eddie Lucio, Jr. (Incumbent)	80,961	100.00	
Majority		80,961	100.00	
Turnout		80,961		
Democratic hold				

Democratic primary, 1992: Senate District 27
Candidate		Votes	%	±
	Juan "Chuy" Hinojosa	25,132	42.67	
✓	Eddie Lucio, Jr. (Incumbent)	33,765	57.33	
Majority		8,633	14.66	
Turnout		58,897		

== District officeholders ==
Legislature	Senator, District 27	Counties in District
5	Claiborne Kyle	Caldwell, Comal, Gonzales, Guadalupe, Hays.
6	Henry Eustace McCulloch	Caldwell, Comal, Gonzales, Guadalupe, Hays.
7	Henry Eustace McCulloch	Caldwell, Comal, Gonzales, Guadalupe, Hays.
8	Thomas Hinds Duggan	Caldwell, Comal, Gonzales, Guadalupe, Hays.
9	John N. Houston	Bell, Burnet, Lampasas, Milam, Williamson.
10	John A. Heiskell	Bell, Burnet, Lampasas, Milam, Williamson.
11	William Cornelius Dalrymple	Bell, Burnet, Lampasas, Milam, Williamson.
12	Thomas H. Baker	Caldwell, Gonzales, Guadalupe.
13	Thomas H. Baker	Caldwell, Gonzales, Guadalupe.
14	John Ireland	Caldwell, Gonzales, Guadalupe, Hays.
15	Wells Thompson	Colorado, Gonzales, Lavaca.
16	Samuel C. Patton	Colorado, Gonzales, Lavaca.
17	Samuel C. Patton	Colorado, Gonzales, Lavaca.
18	Norman G. Collins	Cameron, Dimmit, Duval, Encinal, Frio, Hidalgo, Kinney, La Salle, Maverick, Nueces, Starr, Uvalde, Webb, Zapata, Zavala.
19	E. F. Hall	Cameron, Dimmit, Duval, Encinal, Frio, Hidalgo, Kinney, La Salle, Maverick, Nueces, Starr, Uvalde, Webb, Zapata, Zavala.
20	Francis E. MacManus	Cameron, Dimmit, Duval, Encinal, Frio, Hidalgo, Kinney, La Salle, Maverick, Nueces, Starr, Uvalde, Webb, Zapata, Zavala.
21	Edwin Augustus Atlee	Cameron, Dimmit, Duval, Encinal, Frio, Hidalgo, Kinney, La Salle, Maverick, Nueces, Starr, Uvalde, Webb, Zapata, Zavala.
22	Edwin Augustus Atlee	Cameron, Dimmit, Duval, Encinal, Frio, Hidalgo, Kinney, La Salle, Maverick, Nueces, Starr, Uvalde, Webb, Zapata, Zavala.
23	Woodson H. Browning	Bell, Bosque, Coryell, Hamilton, Lampasas.
24	William L. Harrison	Bell, Bosque, Coryell, Hamilton, Lampasas.
25	William L. Harrison	Bell, Bosque, Coryell, Hamilton, Lampasas.
26	D. E. Patterson	Bell, Bosque, Coryell, Hamilton, Lampasas.
27	D. E. Patterson	Bell, Bosque, Coryell, Hamilton, Lampasas.
28	Robert W. Martin	Bell, Bosque, Coryell, Hamilton.
29	Robert W. Martin	Bell, Bosque, Coryell, Hamilton.
30	Earle Bradford Mayfield	Bell, Bosque, Coryell, Hamilton.
31	Earle Bradford Mayfield	Bell, Bosque, Coryell, Hamilton.
32	Earle Bradford Mayfield	Bell, Bosque, Coryell, Hamilton.
33	Earle Bradford Mayfield; Charles W. Taylor	Bell, Bosque, Coryell, Hamilton.
34	Hugh Harris	Bell, Bosque, Coryell, Hamilton.
35	Aaron C. Buchanan	Bell, Bosque, Coryell, Hamilton.
36	Aaron C. Buchanan	Bell, Bosque, Coryell, Hamilton.
37	Aaron C. Buchanan	Bell, Bosque, Coryell, Hamilton.
38	John W. Thomas	Bell, Bosque, Coryell, Hamilton.
39	Archie Parr	Brooks, Cameron, Dimmit, Duval, Frio, Hidalgo, Jim Hogg, Jim Wells, Kenedy, Kleberg, La Salle, McMullen, Nueces, Starr, Webb, Willacy, Zapata, Zavala.
40	Archie Parr	Brooks, Cameron, Dimmit, Duval, Frio, Hidalgo, Jim Hogg, Jim Wells, Kenedy, Kleberg, La Salle, McMullen, Nueces, Starr, Webb, Willacy, Zapata, Zavala.
41	Archie Parr	Brooks, Cameron, Dimmit, Duval, Frio, Hidalgo, Jim Hogg, Jim Wells, Kenedy, Kleberg, La Salle, McMullen, Nueces, Starr, Webb, Willacy, Zapata, Zavala.
42	Archie Parr	Brooks, Cameron, Dimmit, Duval, Frio, Hidalgo, Jim Hogg, Jim Wells, Kenedy, Kleberg, La Salle, McMullen, Nueces, Starr, Webb, Willacy, Zapata, Zavala.
43	Archie Parr	Brooks, Cameron, Dimmit, Duval, Frio, Hidalgo, Jim Hogg, Jim Wells, Kenedy, Kleberg, La Salle, McMullen, Nueces, Starr, Webb, Willacy, Zapata, Zavala.
44	Jim Neal	Brooks, Cameron, Dimmit, Duval, Frio, Hidalgo, Jim Hogg, Jim Wells, Kenedy, Kleberg, La Salle, McMullen, Nueces, Starr, Webb, Willacy, Zapata, Zavala.
45	Jim Neal	Brooks, Cameron, Dimmit, Duval, Frio, Hidalgo, Jim Hogg, Jim Wells, Kenedy, Kleberg, La Salle, McMullen, Nueces, Starr, Webb, Willacy, Zapata, Zavala.
46	Rogers Kelley	Brooks, Cameron, Dimmit, Duval, Frio, Hidalgo, Jim Hogg, Jim Wells, Kenedy, Kleberg, La Salle, McMullen, Nueces, Starr, Webb, Willacy, Zapata, Zavala.
47	Rogers Kelley	Brooks, Cameron, Dimmit, Duval, Frio, Hidalgo, Jim Hogg, Jim Wells, Kenedy, Kleberg, La Salle, McMullen, Nueces, Starr, Webb, Willacy, Zapata, Zavala.
48	Rogers Kelley	Brooks, Cameron, Dimmit, Duval, Frio, Hidalgo, Jim Hogg, Jim Wells, Kenedy, Kleberg, La Salle, McMullen, Nueces, Starr, Webb, Willacy, Zapata, Zavala.
49	Rogers Kelley	Brooks, Cameron, Dimmit, Duval, Frio, Hidalgo, Jim Hogg, Jim Wells, Kenedy, Kleberg, La Salle, McMullen, Nueces, Starr, Webb, Willacy, Zapata, Zavala.
50	Rogers Kelley	Brooks, Cameron, Dimmit, Duval, Frio, Hidalgo, Jim Hogg, Jim Wells, Kenedy, Kleberg, La Salle, McMullen, Nueces, Starr, Webb, Willacy, Zapata, Zavala.
51	Rogers Kelley	Brooks, Cameron, Dimmit, Duval, Frio, Hidalgo, Jim Hogg, Jim Wells, Kenedy, Kleberg, La Salle, McMullen, Nueces, Starr, Webb, Willacy, Zapata, Zavala.
52	Rogers Kelley	Brooks, Cameron, Dimmit, Duval, Frio, Hidalgo, Jim Hogg, Jim Wells, Kenedy, Kleberg, La Salle, McMullen, Nueces, Starr, Webb, Willacy, Zapata, Zavala.
53	Rogers Kelley	Cameron, Hidalgo.
54	Rogers Kelley	Cameron, Hidalgo.
55	Hubert R. Hudson	Cameron, Hidalgo.
56	Hubert R. Hudson	Cameron, Hidalgo.
57	Hubert R. Hudson	Cameron, Hidalgo.
58	James Bates	Cameron, Hidalgo.
59	James Bates	Cameron, Hidalgo.
60	James Bates	All of Hidalgo. Portion of Cameron.
61	James Bates	All of Hidalgo. Portion of Cameron.
62	James Bates	All of Hidalgo. Portion of Cameron.
63	Raul L. Longoria	Brooks, Cameron, Hidalgo, Jim Wells.
64	Raul L. Longoria	Brooks, Cameron, Hidalgo, Jim Wells.
65	Raul L. Longoria	Brooks, Cameron, Hidalgo, Jim Wells.
66	Raul L. Longoria	Brooks, Cameron, Hidalgo, Jim Wells.
67	Raul L. Longoria; Hector Uribe	Brooks, Cameron, Hidalgo, Jim Wells.
68	Hector Uribe	All of Cameron. Portion of Hidalgo.
69	Hector Uribe	All of Cameron. Portion of Hidalgo.
70	Hector Uribe	All of Cameron. Portion of Hidalgo.
71	Hector Uribe	All of Cameron. Portion of Hidalgo.
72	Eddie Lucio, Jr.	All of Cameron. Portion of Hidalgo.
73	Eddie Lucio, Jr.	All of Cameron. Portion of Hidalgo.
74	Eddie Lucio, Jr.	All of Cameron. Portion of Hidalgo.
75	Eddie Lucio, Jr.	All of Cameron. Portion of Hidalgo.
76	Eddie Lucio, Jr.	All of Cameron. Portion of Hidalgo.
77	Eddie Lucio, Jr.	All of Cameron. Portion of Hidalgo.
78	Eddie Lucio, Jr.	All of Cameron, Kenedy, Kleberg, Willacy. Portion of Hidalgo.
79	Eddie Lucio, Jr.	All of Cameron, Kenedy, Kleberg, Willacy. Portion of Hidalgo.
80	Eddie Lucio, Jr.	All of Cameron, Kenedy, Kleberg, Willacy. Portion of Hidalgo.
81	Eddie Lucio, Jr.	All of Cameron, Kenedy, Kleberg, Willacy. Portion of Hidalgo.
82	Eddie Lucio, Jr.	All of Cameron, Kenedy, Kleberg, Willacy. Portion of Hidalgo.
83	Eddie Lucio, Jr.	All of Cameron, Kenedy, Kleberg, Willacy. Portion of Hidalgo.
84	Eddie Lucio, Jr.	All of Cameron, Kenedy, Kleberg, Willacy. Portion of Hidalgo.
85	Eddie Lucio, Jr.	All of Cameron, Kenedy, Kleberg, Willacy. Portion of Hidalgo.
86	Eddie Lucio, Jr.	All of Cameron, Kenedy, Kleberg, Willacy. Portion of Hidalgo.
87	Eddie Lucio, Jr.	All of Cameron, Kenedy, Kleberg, Willacy. Portion of Hidalgo.
88	Morgan LaMantia	All of Bee, Cameron, Kenedy, Kleberg, San Patricio, Willacy. Portions of Hidalgo, Nueces.
89	Adam Hinojosa	All of Bee, Cameron, Kenedy, Kleberg, San Patricio, Willacy. Portions of Hidalgo, Nueces.
