= Morgan LaMantia =

American politician

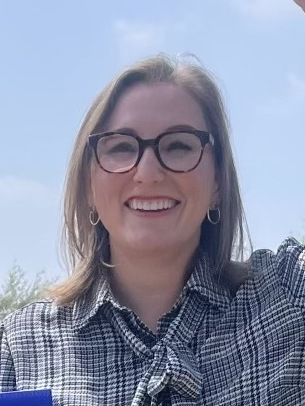
- LaMantia in 2024

Member of the Texas Senate from the 27th district
- In office January 10, 2023 – January 14, 2025
- Preceded by: Eddie Lucio Jr.
- Succeeded by: Adam Hinojosa

Personal details
- Born: December 9, 1986 (age 39) McAllen, Texas, U.S.
- Party: Democratic
- Education: University of Texas at Austin (BA); St. Mary's University, Texas (JD)
- Occupation: Attorney
- Website: https://morganlamantia.com/

Morgan Jessica LaMantia (born December 9, 1986) is an American politician and attorney who represented the 27th district in the Texas Senate from 2023 to 2025.

== Elections ==
=== 2022 ===
On November 22, 2021, LaMantia filed to run for the Texas Senate for District 27. LaMantia ran in a crowded field that included State Representative Alex Dominguez and lawyer Sara Stapleton-Berrera. LaMantia and Stapleton-Berrera advanced to a runoff, in which LaMantia defeated Stapleton-Berrera.

The 27th district was the only competitive district in the 2022 elections. LaMantia faced Republican Adam Hinojosa in the general election. She defeated Hinojosa by 659 votes, prompting Hinojosa to request a recount. Following the recount, LaMantia's lead expanded an additional 18 votes and Hinojosa conceded.

=== 2024 ===
LaMantia ran for re-election in 2024, once again facing Adam Hinojosa in a rematch of the 2022 election. However, Hinojosa defeated LaMantia, flipping the seat for the Republicans.

== Tenure ==
=== Senate Committee Assignments ===
- Education: 2023 - 2025
- Health and Human Services: 2023 - 2025
- Nominations: 2023 - 2025
- State Affairs: 2023 - 2025

=== Senate Special Committee Assignments ===
- Hurricane and Tropical Storm Preparedness, Recovery, and Electricity: 2024 - 2025

== Personal life ==
LaMantia lives in Palm Valley and owns five dogs.
