= Adam Hinojosa =

American politician

Member of the Texas Senate from the 27th district
- Incumbent
- Assumed office January 14, 2025
- Preceded by: Morgan LaMantia

Personal details
- Born: Brownsville, Texas, U.S.
- Party: Republican
- Spouse: Victoria
- Children: 4
- Education: Del Mar College
- Occupation: Businessman
- Website: Office website Campaign website

Adam Hinojosa is an American politician who has represented the 27th district in the Texas Senate since 2025. In the 2022 election, Hinojosa was defeated by his Democratic challenger Morgan LaMantia. He narrowly ousted LaMantia in a rematch two years later.

== Electoral history ==
In the 2022 general election, Hinojosa faced Democratic challenger LaMantia, who had been endorsed by the retiring District 27 senator, Eddie Lucio Jr. Hinojosa campaigned as part of a Republican effort to capitalize on Donald Trump's strong performance in the Rio Grande Valley in the 2020 election to flip multiple legislative and congressional seats in the region. LaMantia won the election by an extremely narrow margin, a result which was not confirmed until after a December recount.

In a 2024 rematch, Hinojosa defeated LaMantia by a narrow margin of 1.09%. Hinojosa was aided by President Donald Trump carrying the district by over 12% in the concurrent Presidential election.

Texas's 27th Senate District, 2022
Party	Candidate	Votes	%
Democratic	Morgan LaMantia	88,037	50.19%
Republican	Adam Hinojosa	87,378	49.81%
Total votes		175,415	100.00%
Democratic hold			

Texas's 27th Senate District, 2024
Party	Candidate	Votes	%
Republican	Adam Hinojosa	126,073	49.38%
Democratic	Morgan LaMantia (incumbent)	123,305	48.29%
Green	Hunter Crow	5,956	2.33%
Total votes		255,334	100.00%
Republican gain from Democratic			

== Tenure ==
=== Committee assignments ===
Hinojosa's committee assignments include:

- Administration: 2025 - present (vice chair)
- Border Security: 2025 - present
- Education K-16: 2025 - present
- State Affairs: 2025 - present
- Water, Agriculture, and Rural Affairs: 2025 - present

== Personal life ==
Before entering politics, Hinojosa graduated from the Del Mar Regional Police Academy in 1999 but chose to join his family's business instead of pursuing law enforcement.

Hinojosa is also a musician and plays piano, saxophone, and bass guitar. He performed in a cover band in his twenties and remains active in music as a hobby. He married his wife, Victoria, in February 2020. They have four children.

Hinojosa's wife, Victoria, is the Republican nominee for District 2 of the Texas State Board of Education in the 2026 election.
