= 2014 Texas Senate election =

- November 4, 2014

15 of the 31 seats in the Texas Senate 16 seats needed for a majority
	Majority party	Minority party	Third party
Party	Republican	Democratic	Libertarian
Last election	19 seats, 62.65%	12 seats, 32.76%	0 seats, 5.12%
Seats before	19	12	0
Seats won	11	4	0
Seats after	20	11	0
Seat change	▲1	▼1	Steady
Popular vote	1,469,629	691,984	165,284
Percentage	63.09%	29.71%	7.10%
Swing	▲0.44%	▼3.05%	▲1.98%
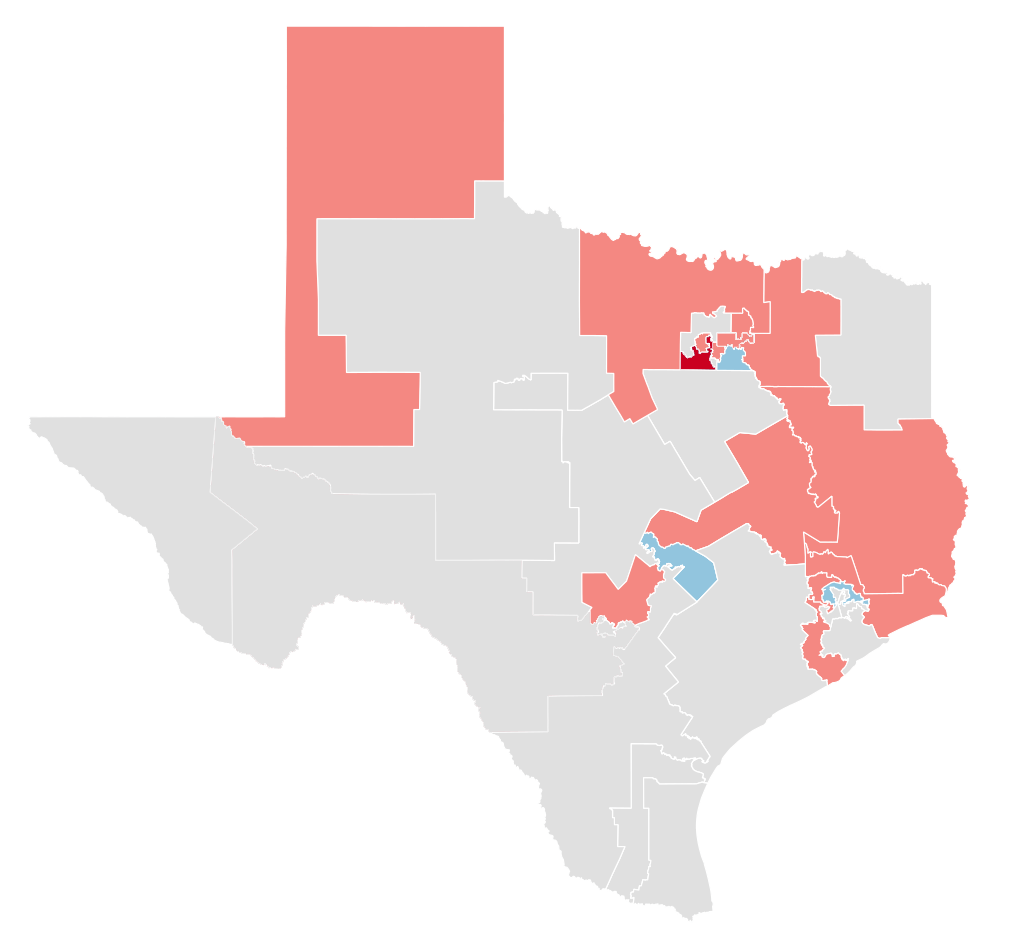
- Senate results by district Republican hold Democratic hold Republican gain No election

The 2014 Texas Senate elections took place as part of the biennial United States elections. Texas voters elected state senators in 15 of the 31 state senate districts. The winners of this election served in the 84th Texas Legislature. State senators serve four-year terms in the Texas State Senate. A statewide map of Texas's state Senate districts can be obtained from the Texas Legislative Council here, and individual district maps can be obtained from the U.S. Census here.

Following the 2012 State Senate elections, the Republicans maintained effective control of the Senate with nineteen members to the Democrats' twelve. As of 2020, this is the last time Republicans have gained seats in the senate in a regularly scheduled election.

To claim control of the chamber from Republicans, the Democrats needed to gain four seats. While the GOP's statewide margin of victory for this class of Senators fell 4.3 percentage points compared to that of the 2012 elections, (Note: Texas holds elections for all Senate seats in years ending in 2. In 2012, for this particular class of Senators, the Republicans and Democrats won 67.40% and 29.69% of the vote, respectively.) nearly all of the decrease was due to greater support for third-party candidates; the Democrats' vote share remained practically the same. In the end, the Republicans flipped one Democrat-held seat, winning twelve out of the fifteen races. Notably, the Libertarian Party fielded candidates in more races than the Democratic Party; as of the 2020, this is the last time this has occurred.

== Predictions ==
Source	Ranking	As of
Governing	Safe R	October 20, 2014

== Summary of race results ==
Summary of the November 4, 2014 Texas Senate election results
Party	Candidates	Votes		Seats				
Party	Candidates	No.	%	Before	Up	Won	After	+/–
Republican	14	1,469,629	63.09	19	11	12	20	▲1
Democratic	9	691,984	29.71	11	4	3	11	▼1
Libertarian	13	165,284	7.10	0	0	0	0	Steady
Green	2	2,397	0.10	0	0	0	0	Steady
Total		2,329,294	100.00	31	15	15	31	Steady

Popular vote
Republican	63.09%
Democratic	29.71%
Libertarian	7.20%
Green	0.10%

Senate seats won
Republican	80.00%
Democratic	20.00%

District	Democratic		Republican		Others		Total		Result
District	Votes	%	Votes	%	Votes	%	Votes	%	Result
District 2	-	-	99,925	83.58%	19,626	16.42%	119,551	100.00%	Republican hold
District 3	-	-	140,069	90.56%	14,605	9.44%	154,674	100.00%	Republican hold
District 5	54,286	31.23%	112,930	64.97%	6,595	3.79%	173,811	100.00%	Republican hold
District 7	45,230	26.29%	123,551	71.82%	3,244	1.89%	172,025	100.00%	Republican hold
District 8	-	-	114,498	79.07%	30,312	20.93%	144,810	100.00%	Republican hold
District 9	47,965	34.94%	89,331	65.06%	-	-	137,296	100.00%	Republican hold
District 10	80,872	44.72%	95,532	52.83%	4,434	2.45%	180,838	100.00%	R GAIN from D
District 14	154,391	79.98%	-	-	38,648	20.02%	193,039	100.00%	Democratic hold
District 15	74,192	59.17%	48,249	38.48%	2,947	2.35%	125,388	100.00%	Democratic hold
District 16	-	-	106,546	100.00%	-	-	106,546	100.00%	Republican hold
District 17	60,934	33.91%	113,817	63.34%	4,945	2.76%	179,696	100.00%	Republican hold
District 23	99,102	79.39%	23,520	18.84%	2,204	1.77%	124,826	100.00%	Democratic hold
District 25	75,012	31.83%	153,536	65.15%	7,106	3.02%	235,654	100.00%	Republican hold
District 30	-	-	140,240	86.65%	21,599	13.35%	161,839	100.00%	Republican hold
District 31	-	-	107,885	90.43%	11,416	9.57%	119,301	100.00%	Republican hold
Total	691,984	29.71%	1,469,629	63.09%	167,681	7.20%	2,329,294	100.00%	Source:
