= Brent Hagenbuch =

American politician

Member of the Texas Senate from the 30th district
- Incumbent
- Assumed office January 14, 2025
- Preceded by: Drew Springer

Personal details
- Party: Republican
- Spouse: Jean
- Children: 2
- Education: United States Naval Academy (BS); Stanford University(MS); UCLA(MBA)
- Occupation: Businessman
- Website: Office website Campaign website

Brent A. Hagenbuch is an American politician and the member for District 30 of the Texas Senate. He won in the 2024 general election, replacing Drew Springer, who announced his retirement in 2023. Hagenbuch is a United States Navy veteran and previously served as the Denton County Republican chair.

== Election ==
Hagenbuch announced his candidacy at the end of November 2023, for the open Senate District 30 seat that was then held by Drew Springer. Springer previously announced that he would not be running for re-election earlier that month. Controversy about his residency began, soon after his announcement, among the other candidates in the Republican primary election, who wanted to remove him from the ballot. Towards the end of January 2024, a judge allowed Hagenbuch to continue campaigning amid questions about his eligibility. Hagenbuch finished with 36.38% of the vote in the 2024 March primary election, in which he led the other candidates. A runoff election was set for May 28, 2024. Brent defeated Jace Yarbrough in the runoff election to advance him to the general election against Democrat Dale Frey. Questions about Hagenbuch's residency continued until general election, including from his Democratic opponent. With 65.1% of the vote, Hagenbuch won the 2024 general election.
