= Tan Parker =

American politician (born 1971)

Majority Leader of the Texas Senate
- Incumbent
- Assumed office January 14, 2025
- Preceded by: Angela Paxton
- Acting; July 17, 2023 – September 16, 2023
- Preceded by: Angela Paxton
- Succeeded by: Angela Paxton

Member of the Texas Senate from the 12th district
- Incumbent
- Assumed office January 10, 2023
- Preceded by: Jane Nelson

Majority Leader of the Texas House of Representatives
- In office January 14, 2015 – March 8, 2018
- Preceded by: Cindy Burkett (acting)
- Succeeded by: Cindy Burkett

Member of the Texas House of Representatives from the 63rd district
- In office January 9, 2007 – January 10, 2023
- Preceded by: Mary Denny
- Succeeded by: Ben Bumgarner

Personal details
- Born: Nathaniel Willis Parker IV; May 22, 1971 (age 55) Pittsburgh, Pennsylvania, U.S.
- Party: Republican
- Spouse: Beth Parker
- Children: 2
- Education: University of Dallas (BA); London School of Economics (MS)
- Website: Office website Campaign website

Nathaniel Willis "Tan" Parker IV (born May 22, 1971) is an American politician. A Republican, he has represented the District 12 in the Texas Senate since 2023, and is the current chair of the Texas Senate Republican Caucus. He served in the Texas House of Representatives from 2007 to 2023. He was elected in 2006 to represent District 63. Parker sought the position of Texas House Speaker with the retirement of Joe Straus but withdrew his candidacy in 2018 to support the consensus choice, representative Dennis Bonnen of Angleton in Brazoria County.

== Background ==
Parker was educated at the University of Dallas, at which he served in the College Republicans Club. He earned a Bachelor of Arts degree in political philosophy and Economics in 1993. In 1992 he worked briefly in the White House of George H. W. Bush. He later earned a Master's Degree from the London School of Economics.

Parker serves on several board of directors and advisory councils, including the University of Dallas, Communities in Schools North Texas, the Children’s Advocacy Center for Denton County, and Kyle’s Place, an emerging shelter project for homeless teens.

Parker resides in Flower Mound with his wife of over 30 years, Beth Haugan Parker, whom he met while a student at the University of Dallas. The Parkers have two daughters, Lauren and Ashley.

== Political career ==
In 2006, Parker first ran for state office when his predecessor, Mary C. Denny, vacated the seat for House District 63. He faced four opponents in the Republican primary election, including Lewisville ISD board president Anne Lakusta, who received the endorsement of the Dallas Morning News. Parker garnered the most votes in the primary but needed a runoff to defeat Lakusta. No other party fielded a candidate in the general election, so Parker's runoff election win earned him the seat.

In 2008, Parker faced two candidates, Democrat Jesus Carrillo and Libertarian candidate John Turner. He defeated both with 64,048 votes (72.97 percent) to Carrillo's 19,883 (22.65 percent) and Turner's 3,831 (4.36 percent).

In 2010, he was unopposed in both the Republican primary and the general election.

In 2012, Parker ran unopposed in the Republican primary election and defeated Libertarian Bruce Hermann in the general election, which took place on November 6, 2012.

In 2014, he ran unopposed in the Republican primary election. He faced Democrat Daniel Moran in the general election and defeated Moran with 30,809 votes (77.3%) to Moran's 9,026 (22.7%).

In 2015, Parker's colleagues elected him the Chairman of the House Republican Caucus and he was chosen later that year as the best legislator by Texas Monthly magazine.

On March 1, 2016, he once again won the Republican primary election for House District 63.

Upon entering the 85th Legislative Session, Parker was unanimously re-elected as the chairman of the House Republican Caucus, which represents the Republican members of the Texas House by supplying its members with policy development and other crucial support services.

On March 8, 2018, Parker became the third member of the House of Representatives to file for Speaker of the Texas House of Representatives to replace Joe Straus, a moderate Republican, who steps down with the regular legislative session in January 2019. He subsequently won reelection on November 6, 52,893 votes (67.2 percent) to 25,852 (32.8 percent) for his Democratic opponent, Laura Haines. Thereafter, he left the speaker's race.

Parker would win re-election for HD63 again in both 2018 and in 2020.

On July 7, 2021, Parker announced his bid to run for the Texas Senate, for District 12 in 2022. The announcement comes two days after District 12 current Senator Jane Nelson announced her retirement from the Senate. On March 1, 2022, Parker won the Republican nomination with 53,212 votes (71.07 percent) to 21,657 (28.93 percent) for Chris Russell Parker won the 2022 General Election against Francine Ly, with a margin of 23-points.

In 2024 he faced no opposition in the Republican primary for his Texas Senate seat.

== Business leadership ==
In May 2025 Southland Holdings appointed Parker to its Board of Directors.

In July 2026 Parker joined the Board of Directors of Mazebolt, an Israel-based cyber security company that continuously validates DDoS defenses.

Texas House of Representatives
Preceded by Mary Denny	Member of the Texas House of Representatives from the 63rd district 2007–2023	Succeeded by Ben Bumgarner
Preceded by Cindy Burkett; Acting	Majority Leader of the Texas House of Representatives; 2015–2018	Succeeded by Cindy Burkett
Texas Senate
Preceded by Jane Nelson	Member of the Texas Senate from the 12th district 2023–present	Incumbent
Preceded by Angela Paxton	Majority Leader of the Texas Senate; Acting; 2023	Succeeded by Angela Paxton
Preceded by Angela Paxton	Majority Leader of the Texas Senate; 2025–present	Incumbent
