= 2022 Texas Senate election =

- November 8, 2022

All of the 31 seats in the Texas Senate 16 seats needed for a majority
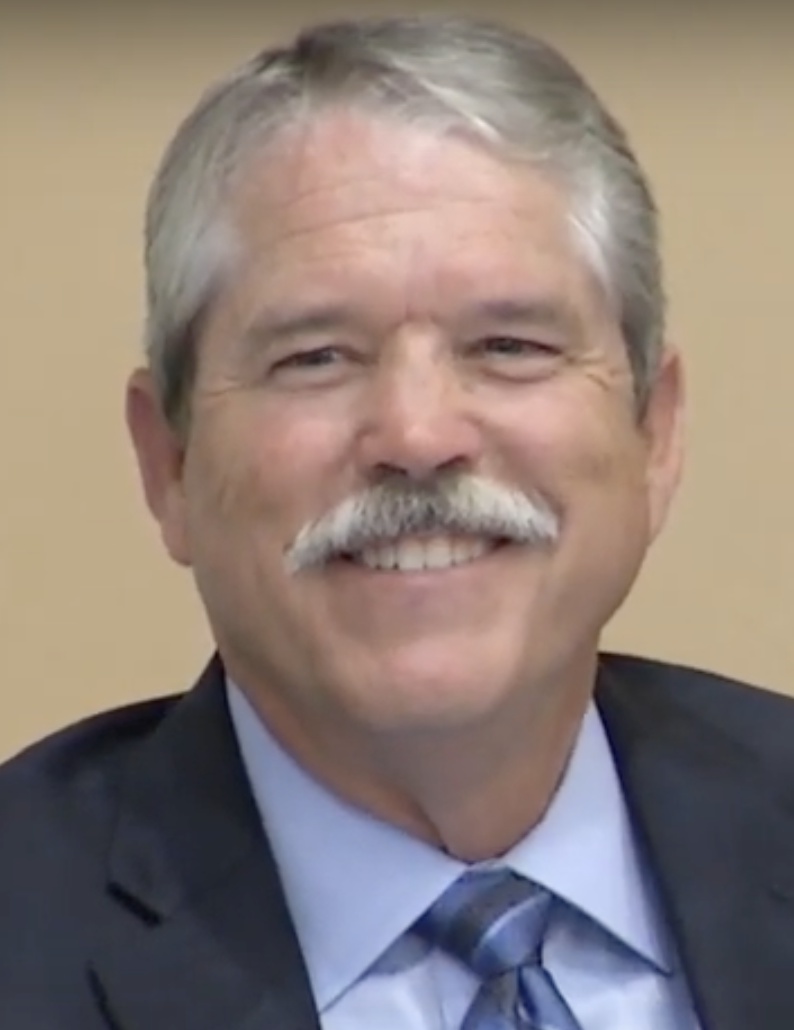

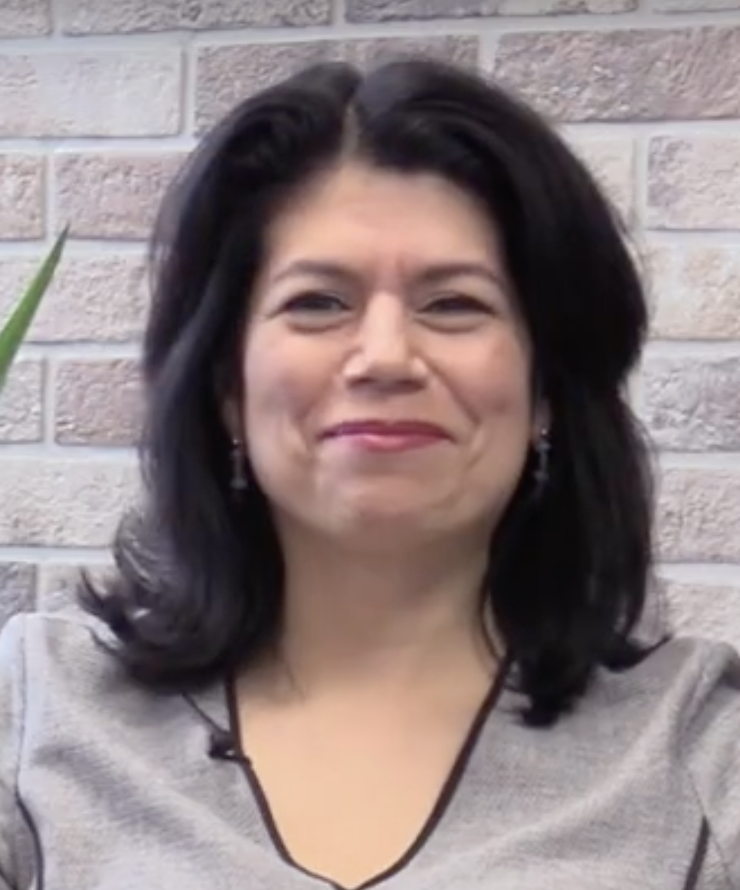
	Majority party	Minority party
Leader	Larry Taylor (retired)	Carol Alvarado
Party	Republican	Democratic
Leader since	January 12, 2021	January 8, 2020
Leader's seat	11th–Friendswood	6th–Houston
Last election	8 seats, 53.28%	8 seats, 44.59%
Seats before	18	13
Seats won	19	12
Seat change	▲1	▼1
Popular vote	2,948,643	2,287,700
Percentage	54.06%	41.94%
Swing	▲0.78%	▼2.65%
- Democratic hold Republican hold Republican gain Republican: 50–60% 60–70% 70–80% ≥90% Democratic: 50–60% 60–70% 80–90% ≥90%

The 2022 Texas Senate elections were held on November 8, 2022.

Under the provisions of the Constitution of Texas, all 31 senate districts across the state of Texas were up for re-election, as the election was the first after the decennial United States Census. Numerous other federal, state, and local elections were also held on this date. The winners of this election served in the 88th Texas Legislature, with seats apportioned among the 2020 United States census. Republicans had held a majority in the Texas Senate since January 14, 1997, as a result of the 1996 elections.

== Retirements ==
As of April 2022, six state senators, including four Republicans and two Democrats, decided to retire, one of whom sought another office.

=== Republicans ===
- District 11: Larry Taylor retired.
- District 12: Jane Nelson retired.
- District 24: Dawn Buckingham retired to run for Texas Land Commissioner.
- District 31: Kel Seliger retired.

=== Democrats ===
- District 10: Beverly Powell retired.
- District 27: Eddie Lucio Jr. retired.

== Predictions ==
Redistricting greatly reduced the number of competitive seats in the state, making it almost certain that the chamber would remain in Republican hands.

=== Statewide ===
Source	Ranking	As of
Sabato's Crystal Ball	Safe R	May 19, 2022
CNalysis	Safe R	Nov. 7, 2022

=== Competitive districts ===
District	Incumbent	2020 Pres.	CNalysis	Result
19th	Roland Gutierrez	55.81% D	Likely D	55.39% D
27th	Eddie Lucio Jr. (retiring)	51.75% D	Lean R (flip)	50.19% D

== Results summary ==
Summary of the November 8, 2022 Texas Senate election results
Party	Candidates	Votes		Seats			
Party	Candidates	No.	%	Before	Won	After	+/–
Republican	27	2,948,643	54.06	18	19	19	▲1
Democratic	22	2,287,700	41.94	13	12	12	▼1
Libertarian	6	217,910	4.00	0	0	0	Steady
Total		5,454,253	100.00	31	31	31	Steady

Popular vote
Republican	54.06%
Democratic	41.94%
Libertarian	4.00%

Senate seats won
Republican	61.29%
Democratic	38.71%

== Close races ==
District	Winner	Margin
District 27	Democratic	0.38%

== Detailed results ==
=== District 1 ===
Incumbent Republican Bryan Hughes won re-election unopposed.

District 1 general election
Party	Candidate	Votes	%
Republican	Bryan Hughes (incumbent)	–	100.00%
Total votes		–	100.00%
Republican hold			

=== District 2 ===
Incumbent Republican Bob Hall won re-election.

District 2 general election
Party	Candidate	Votes	%
Republican	Bob Hall (incumbent)	172,713	61.90%
Democratic	Prince Giadolor	106,309	38.10%
Total votes		279,022	100.00%
Republican hold			

=== District 3 ===
Incumbent Republican Robert Nichols won re-election.

District 3 general election
Party	Candidate	Votes	%
Republican	Robert Nichols (incumbent)	213,288	77.41%
Democratic	Steve Russell	58,285	21.16%
Libertarian	Desarae Lindsey	3,941	1.43%
Total votes		275,514	100.00%
Republican hold			

=== District 4 ===
Incumbent Republican Brandon Creighton won re-election.

District 4 general election
Party	Candidate	Votes	%
Republican	Brandon Creighton (incumbent)	202,341	69.94%
Democratic	Misty Bishop	86,946	30.06%
Total votes		289,287	100.00%
Republican hold			

=== District 5 ===
Incumbent Republican Charles Schwertner won re-election.

District 5 general election
Party	Candidate	Votes	%
Republican	Charles Schwertner (incumbent)	192,146	71.57%
Libertarian	Misty Bishop	76,317	28.43%
Total votes		268,463	100.00%
Republican hold			

=== District 6 ===
Incumbent Democrat Carol Alvarado won re-election unopposed.

District 6 general election
Party	Candidate	Votes	%
Democratic	Carol Alvarado (incumbent)	–	100.00%
Total votes		–	100.00%
Democratic hold			

=== District 7 ===
Incumbent Republican Paul Bettencourt won re-election unopposed.

District 7 general election
Party	Candidate	Votes	%
Republican	Paul Bettencourt (incumbent)	–	100.00%
Total votes		–	100.00%
Republican hold			

=== District 8 ===
Incumbent Republican Angela Paxton won re-election.

District 8 general election
Party	Candidate	Votes	%
Republican	Angela Paxton (incumbent)	187,754	57.69%
Democratic	Jonathan Cocks	128,399	39.45%
Libertarian	Edward Kless	9,293	2.86%
Total votes		325,446	100.00%
Republican hold			

=== District 9 ===
District 9 election
- November 8, 2022
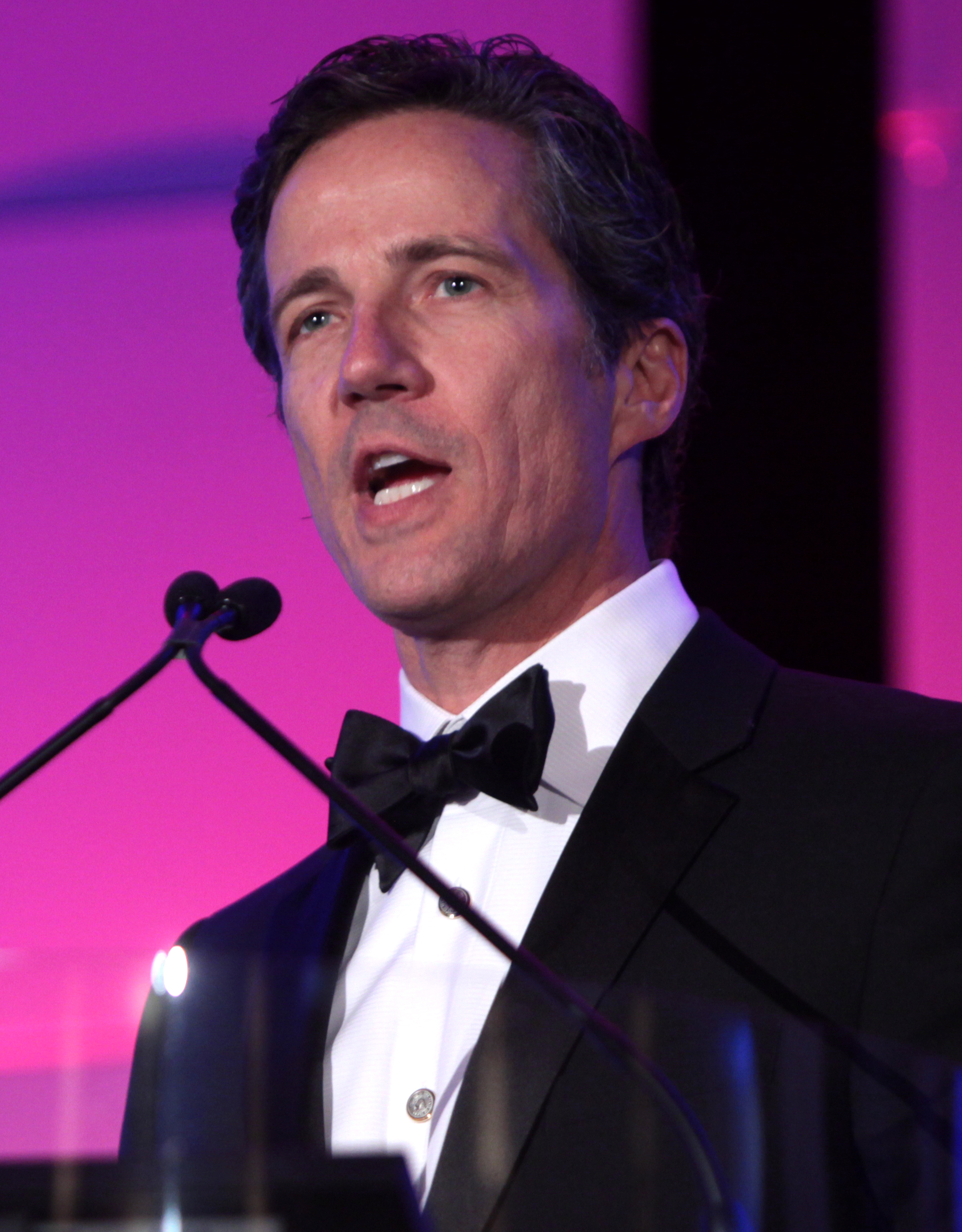

Candidate	Kelly Hancock	Gwenn Burud
Party	Republican	Democratic
Popular vote	166,864	111,019
Percentage	60.05%	39.95%
- Precinct results Hancock: 50–60% 60–70% 70–80% 80–90% >90% Burud: 50–60% 60–70% 70–80% 80–90% >90% Tie: 50% No votes
Senator before election
Kelly Hancock
Republican
Elected Senator
Kelly Hancock
Republican

Incumbent Republican Kelly Hancock won re-election.

District 9 general election
Party	Candidate	Votes	%
Republican	Kelly Hancock (incumbent)	166,864	60.05%
Democratic	Gwenn Burud	111,019	39.95%
Total votes		277,883	100.00%
Republican hold			

=== District 10 ===
Incumbent Democrat Beverly Powell retired after her district was considerably changed during the 2021 redistricting to make it more Republican-leaning, calling the new district "unwinnable." State Representative Phil King ran for the newly-drawn seat, and because Powell withdrew after the primary, King entered the general election unopposed, guaranteeing Republicans would flip the seat.

District 10 general election
Party	Candidate	Votes	%
Republican	Phil King	–	100.00%
Total votes		–	100.00%
Republican gain from Democratic			

=== District 11 ===
Incumbent Republican Larry Taylor retired. State Representative Mayes Middleton ran to replace him unopposed in the general election.

District 11 general election
Party	Candidate	Votes	%
Republican	Mayes Middleton	–	100.00%
Total votes		–	100.00%
Republican hold			

=== District 12 ===
Incumbent Republican Jane Nelson, who first won her seat in 1992, retired. State Representative Tan Parker ran to replace her.

District 12 general election
Party	Candidate	Votes	%
Republican	Tan Parker	213,018	61.44%
Democratic	Francine Ly	133,679	38.56%
Total votes		346,697	100.00%
Republican hold			

=== District 13 ===
Incumbent Democrat Borris Miles won re-election unopposed.

District 13 general election
Party	Candidate	Votes	%
Democratic	Borris Miles (incumbent)	–	100.00%
Total votes		–	100.00%
Democratic hold			

=== District 14 ===
Incumbent Democrat Sarah Eckhardt won re-election.

District 14 general election
Party	Candidate	Votes	%
Democratic	Sarah Eckhardt (incumbent)	265,094	82.23%
Libertarian	Steven Haskett	57,305	17.77%
Total votes		322,399	100.00%
Democratic hold			

=== District 15 ===
Incumbent Democrat John Whitmire won re-election but had also announced his bid for mayor of Houston in the 2023 election.

District 15 general election
Party	Candidate	Votes	%
Democratic	John Whitmire (incumbent)	159,125	65.33%
Republican	George Brian Vachris	84,437	34.67%
Total votes		243,562	100.00%
Democratic hold			

=== District 16 ===
Incumbent Democrat Nathan Johnson won re-election.

District 16 general election
Party	Candidate	Votes	%
Democratic	Nathan Johnson (incumbent)	118,663	61.95%
Republican	Brandon Copeland	72,885	38.05%
Total votes		191,548	100.00%
Democratic hold			

=== District 17 ===
Incumbent Republican Joan Huffman won re-election.

District 17 general election
Party	Candidate	Votes	%
Republican	Joan Huffman	179,653	65.33%
Democratic	Titus Benton	95,320	34.67%
Total votes		274,973	100.00%
Republican hold			

=== District 18 ===
Incumbent Republican Lois Kolkhorst won re-election.

District 18 general election
Party	Candidate	Votes	%
Republican	Lois Kolkhorst	186,367	66.17%
Democratic	Josh Tutt	95,287	33.83%
Total votes		281,654	100.00%
Republican hold			

=== District 19 ===
Incumbent Democrat Roland Gutierrez won re-election.

District 19 general election
Party	Candidate	Votes	%
Democratic	Roland Gutierrez (incumbent)	117,491	55.39%
Republican	Robert Garza	94,613	44.61%
Total votes		212,104	100.00%
Democratic hold			

=== District 20 ===
Incumbent Democrat Juan Hinojosa won re-election.

District 20 general election
Party	Candidate	Votes	%
Democratic	Juan Hinojosa (incumbent)	102,280	59.18%
Republican	Westley Wright	70,536	40.82%
Total votes		172,816	100.00%
Democratic hold			

=== District 21 ===
Incumbent Democrat Judith Zaffirini won re-election.

District 21 general election
Party	Candidate	Votes	%
Democratic	Judith Zaffirini (incumbent)	129,832	61.56%
Republican	Julie Dahlberg	75,799	35.94%
Libertarian	Arthur DiBianca	5,282	2.50%
Total votes		210,913	100.00%
Democratic hold			

=== District 22 ===
Incumbent Republican Brian Birdwell won re-election.

District 22 general election
Party	Candidate	Votes	%
Republican	Brian Birdwell	190,988	74.26%
Libertarian	Jeremy Schroppel	66,204	25.74%
Total votes		257,192	100.00%
Republican hold			

=== District 23 ===
Incumbent Democrat Royce West won re-election unopposed.

District 23 general election
Party	Candidate	Votes	%
Democratic	Royce West (incumbent)	–	100.00%
Total votes		–	100.00%
Democratic hold			

=== District 24 ===
Incumbent Republican Dawn Buckingham retired to run for Texas Land Commissioner. Pete Flores, who had previously represented the 19th district in the Senate, ran to replace her.

District 24 general election
Party	Candidate	Votes	%
Republican	Pete Flores	187,598	64.32%
Democratic	Kathy Jones-Hospod	104,063	35.68%
Total votes		291,661	100.00%
Republican hold			

=== District 25 ===
Incumbent Republican Donna Campbell won re-election.

District 25 general election
Party	Candidate	Votes	%
Republican	Donna Campbell	243,966	62.83%
Democratic	Robert Walsh	144,350	37.17%
Total votes		388,316	100.00%
Republican hold			

=== District 26 ===
Incumbent Democrat Jose Menendez won re-election.

District 26 general election
Party	Candidate	Votes	%
Democratic	Jose Menendez (incumbent)	140,799	66.55%
Republican	Ashton Murray	70,773	33.45%
Total votes		211,572	100.00%
Democratic hold			

=== District 27 ===
District 27 election
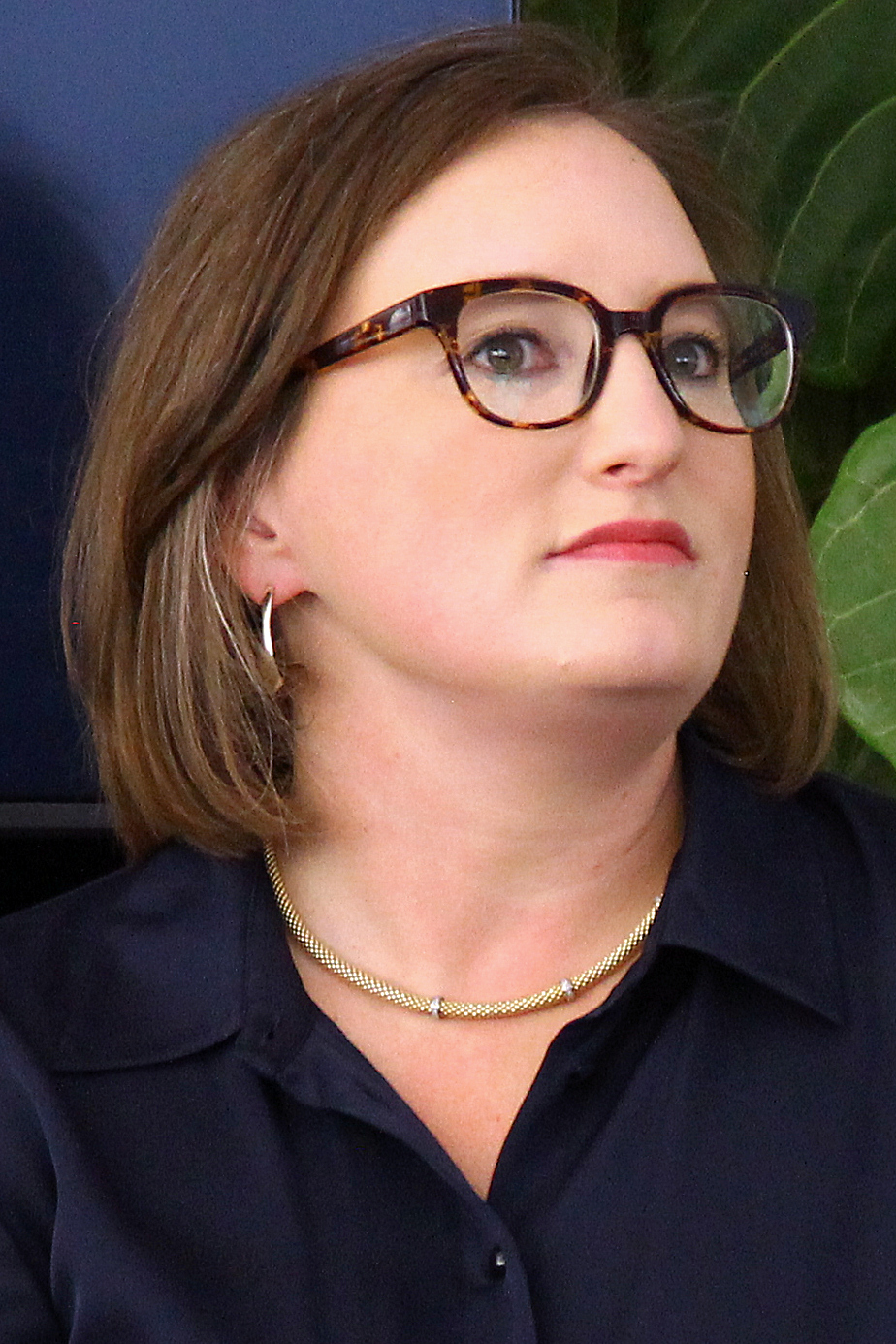

Nominee	Morgan LaMantia	Adam Hinojosa
Party	Democratic	Republican
Popular vote	88,037	87,378
Percentage	50.19%	49.81%
- County results LaMantia: 50–60% 60–70% Hinojosa: 50–60% 60–70% 70–80%
Texas Senator before election
Eddie Lucio Jr.
Democratic Party
Elected Texas Senator
Morgan LaMantia
Democratic Party

Incumbent Democrat Eddie Lucio Jr., often considered the most conservative Democrat in the Texas Senate, announced he would not run for re-election in November 2021. Lucio was the only Democrat to vote in favor of Texas's abortion laws and school voucher legislation, but all three Democrats running to replace him were pro-choice. He endorsed Morgan LaMantia despite her views on abortion, considering her to be the most moderate of the three, and she won the primary in a runoff. She faced Republican Adam Hinojosa in the general election, who campaigned as part of a Republican effort to capitalize on Donald Trump's strong performance in the Rio Grande Valley in the 2020 election to flip multiple legislative and congressional seats in the region.

Polling

Poll source	Date(s) administered	Sample size (Note: Key: A – all adults RV – registered voters LV – likely voters V – unclear)	Margin of error	Morgan LaMantia (D)	Adam Hinojosa (R)	Undecided
Ragnar Research Partners (R) (Note: This poll was sponsored by Hinojosa's campaign)	August 23–25, 2022	400 (LV)	± 4.9%	38%	43%	19%

Hypothetical polling

Generic Democrat vs. generic Republican

Poll source	Date(s) administered	Sample size	Margin of error	Generic Democrat	Generic Republican	Undecided
Ragnar Research Partners (R)	August 23–25, 2022	400 (LV)	± 4.9%	46%	41%	12%

LaMantia won the election by an extremely narrow margin, a result which was not confirmed until after a December recount.

District 27 general election
Party	Candidate	Votes	%
Democratic	Morgan LaMantia	88,037	50.19%
Republican	Adam Hinojosa	87,378	49.81%
Total votes		175,415	100.00%
Democratic hold			

=== District 28 ===
Incumbent Republican Charles Perry won re-election unopposed.

District 28 general election
Party	Candidate	Votes	%
Republican	Charles Perry (incumbent)	–	100.00%
Total votes		–	100.00%
Republican hold			

=== District 29 ===
Incumbent Democrat Cesar Blanco won re-election.

District 29 general election
Party	Candidate	Votes	%
Democratic	Cesar Blanco (incumbent)	111,638	64.09%
Republican	Derek Zubeldia	62,544	35.91%
Total votes		174,182	100.00%
Democratic hold			

=== District 30 ===
Incumbent Republican Drew Springer won re-election unopposed

District 30 general election
Party	Candidate	Votes	%
Republican	Drew Springer (incumbent)	–	100.00%
Total votes		–	100.00%
Republican hold			

=== District 31 ===
Incumbent Republican Kel Seliger, who often bucked party leadership on hardline issues such as school vouchers, putting him at odds with lieutenant governor Dan Patrick, drew several primary challengers. Foremost among them was Kevin Sparks, who was endorsed by former President Donald Trump, U.S. senator Ted Cruz, as well as Dan Patrick. He quickly became the seat's frontrunner after Seliger announced he would not run for re-election. Sparks won the Republican primary outright, avoiding a runoff, and faced no Democratic opponent in the general election.

District 31 general election
Party	Candidate	Votes	%
Republican	Kevin Sparks	–	100.00%
Total votes		–	100.00%
Republican hold			

== See also ==
- 2022 United States House of Representatives elections in Texas
- 2022 Texas gubernatorial election
- 2022 Texas Attorney General election
- 2022 United States state legislative elections
- 2022 Texas House of Representatives election
- 2022 Texas elections

== Notes ==
Partisan clients
