= 1869 Texas Senate election =

- November 30, 1869

All 30 seats in the Texas Senate 16 seats needed for a majority
	Majority party	Minority party	Third party
Party	Republican	Democratic	Independent
Alliance	Radical	Conservative	Conservative
Seats won	19 (Note: One moderate Republican was elected but was quickly replaced by a radical.)	9	2 (Note: Both Independents are listed as Democrats in some sources)
Popular vote	40,080	31,292	6,279
Percentage	51.62%	40.30%	8.09%
- Republican win Democratic win Independent win Non-district territory
Elected President Pro Tempore
Donald Campbell
Republican

The 1869 Texas Senate elections took place in tandem with the 1869 Texas gubernatorial election and the election for the ratification of a new state constitution as a part of Texas's readmission to the United States following the Civil War. Texas voters elected state senators in all 30 State Senate districts. The winners of this election served in the 12th Texas Legislature, holding staggered six-year terms. This was the first time the Republican Party had ever won a majority in the Texas Senate, and it would be the only time they would do so until 1996.

== Background ==
Texas underwent military occupation as a part of Reconstruction following the defeat of the Confederate States of America in the Civil War. The state adopted a new constitution in 1866 and held legislative elections, which were won primarily by conservative White Democrats. The legislature refused to adopt the Thirteenth Amendment and instead passed laws establishing "black codes" to attempt to maintain a system of white supremacy. This legislature was declared provisional after the passage of the First Reconstruction Act by Congress in 1867 as the state government underwent a full military takeover. Any elected official who had failed to take a "Test Oath" had been removed by April 1869.

A new constitutional convention was called in June 1868, but it did not adjourn until February 1869. A new election was initially planned for the Spring, but it was not held until the end of the year. Elections for governor and the legislature were held concurrently with the election to ratify the state's new constitution.

== Results ==
Republicans won a majority of seats, securing nineteen while Democrats won nine. Two conservative independents also won seats. Two African Americans, George Ruby and Matthew Gaines, were among the Republicans elected, the first to do so in the state's history. Many of the other Republicans elected were scalawags, southern Whites who nonetheless sided with Reconstruction. Outside of regions with substantial freedman populations, Republicans also found voter support in the heavily German-immigrant Hill Country, as well as in West Texas. Every elected Republican was considered a Radical Republican except for Andrew Evans, who was unseated in an election contest shortly after taking office and replaced by Radical Republican S.W. Ford.

=== Close races ===
Seats where the margin of victory was under 10%:

1. Senate district 4, 1.26%
2. Senate district 5, 1.60%
3. Senate district 30, 1.94%
4. Senate district 27, 2.04%
5. Senate district 18, 2.48%
6. Senate district 11, 2.59%
7. Senate district 3, 2.98%
8. Senate district 24, 4.33%
9. Senate district 19, 5.47% (Note: Against another Republican.)
10. Senate district 8, 5.82%
11. Senate district 9, 6.14%
12. Senate district 29, 7.90%
13. Senate district 13, 7.91%
14. Senate district 12, 8.94%
15. Senate district 10, 9.13%

== Detailed results by district ==
Candidates are not listed with political parties in the results. The parties of all victorious candidates are known, and the parties of others may be assumed by the presence of candidates running in the concurrent House election in the same district.

=== District 1 ===
Results by county Pickett: 50–60%; 80–90%; >90%; Thomas: 50–60%; 60–70%; Chambers: 30–40%; Harrison: 60–70%

Colonel Edward Bradford Pickett, a lawyer and veteran of the Mexican–American War, was elected as a Democrat to represent the 1st district, based in the southeastern corner of the state. Pickett had previously been elected to the House of Representatives in 1860 before leading a volunteer company to fight for the Confederacy.

District 1 election
Party	Candidate	Votes	%
Democratic	Edward Bradford Pickett	1,339	55.22%
Republican	J. H. Thomas	653	26.19%
Republican	William Chambers	235	9.69%
Independent	A. J. Harrison	197	8.12%
Independent	C. H. Jones	1	0.04%
Total votes		2,425	100.0%
Democratic win			

=== District 2 ===
Democrat Amos Clark was elected to represent the 2nd district, based in Nacogdoches. Over 70 years old at the time of his election, he was one of the oldest members of the legislature. He later died in office in 1871.

District 2 election
Party	Candidate	Votes	%
Democratic	Amos Clark	1,022	36.40%
Republican	D. S. Carnahan	685	24.39%
Independent	W. A. Reeves	629	22.40%
Independent	R. Waterhouse	472	16.81%
Total votes		2,808	100.0%
Democratic win			

=== District 3 ===
Republican Mijamin Priest, a Presbyterian pastor and former member of the Alabama House of Representatives, was elected to represent the 3rd district, covering Cherokee and Houston counties, in a highly contested race against Democrat James Eldrage Dillard. Priest had taken an amnesty oath following the Civil War, suggesting he had served in the Confederate military. Supporters of Dillard charged that the close election had been stolen by Priest, but Priest was nonetheless declared the victor. Priest refused to take the Ironclad Oath required to qualify for his seat initially and was declared ineligible for his office by the military government, but he would eventually qualify for the following called session in April 1870.

Priest resigned in late 1870, and Dillard would be elected to fill his seat in the ensuing special election. The highly public and controversial battle between Priest and Dillard over the results of the election deteriorated the public's perception of the Radical Republicans.

District 3 election
Party	Candidate	Votes	%
Republican	Mijamin Priest	1,259	51.49%
Democratic	James Eldrage Dillard	1,186	48.51%
Total votes		2,445	100.0%
Republican win			

=== District 4 ===
Republican Elisha Pettit, the former president of Marshall University, was elected to represent the 4th district.

District 4 election
Party	Candidate	Votes	%
Republican	Elisha Pettit	1,201	50.63%
Democratic	W. H. Tucker	1,171	49.37%
Total votes		2,372	100.0%
Republican win			

=== District 5 ===
Republican Webster Flanagan, the son of J. W. Flanagan, who was concurrently elected lieutenant governor, was elected to represent the 5th district, based in Rusk and Panola counties. Flanagan was a Unionist prior to the Civil War, but he served in the Confederate army until he contracted tuberculosis. A Radical Republican, Flanagan was a delegate to the convention which produced the Constitution of 1869. He became popular in his district by preventing the stationing of federal troops there during the Union occupation.

District 5 election
Party	Candidate	Votes	%
Republican	Webster Flanagan	1,263	50.80%
Democratic	W. B. Ector	1,223	49.20%
Total votes		2,486	100.0%
Republican win			

=== District 6 ===
Major James Postell Douglas was elected to represent the 6th district, based in Tyler. Having served in the Confederate army, he partially owned and edited the Tyler Reporter and facilitated the construction of multiple railroads in the region.

District 6 election
Party	Candidate	Votes	%
Democratic	James Postell Douglas	1,274	47.10%
Republican	Z. Norton	997	36.86%
Republican	L. P. Harris	433	16.01%
Independent	Van Hamilton	1	0.04%
Total votes		2,705	100.0%
Democratic win			

=== District 7 ===
Radical Republican Henry Rawson was elected to represent the 7th district, composed solely of Harrison County. He had held no other political office prior to his election.

District 7 election
Party	Candidate	Votes	%
Republican	Henry Rawson	1,830	75.62%
Democratic	J. M. Nascomb	590	24.38%
Total votes		2,420	100.0%
Republican win			

=== District 8 ===
Republican Donald Campbell, a staunch Unionist before the Civil War, was elected to represent the 8th district. He was elected president pro tempore of the Senate after lieutenant governor J. W. Flanagan was elected to the United States Senate, giving Campbell the office ex officio.

District 8 election
Party	Candidate	Votes	%
Republican	Donald Campbell	1,490	52.91%
Democratic	W. L. Crawford	1,326	47.09%
Total votes		2,816	100.0%
Republican win			

=== District 9 ===
Democrat Henry R. Latimer, a signer of the Texas Declaration of Independence, was elected to represent the 9th district, based in Red River County.

District 9 election
Party	Candidate	Votes	%
Democratic	Henry R. Latimer	1,078	52.97%
Republican	W. H. Fleming	953	46.83%
Independent	A. J. Harrison	3	0.15%
Independent	C. H. Jones	1	0.05%
Total votes		2,035	100.0%
Democratic win			

=== District 10 ===
Democrat David W. Cole, one of the first White settlers in the area, was elected to represent the 10th district, covering Lamar and Hopkins counties. One of very few conservatives present at the constitutional convention, Cole was arrested for refusing to vote on the controversial issue of dividing the state, though he was later released and voted to keep the state whole.

District 10 election
Party	Candidate	Votes	%
Democratic	David W. Cole	882	54.44%
Republican	B. A. VanSickle	734	45.31%
Write-in		4	0.25%
Total votes		1,620	100.0%
Democratic win			

=== District 11 ===
Ebenezer L. Dohoney, a moderately conservative Democrat, was elected to represent the 11th district, based in Paris. A staunch Unionist who gained notoriety when he successfully swayed the voters of his home of Lamar County to oppose secession in 1861, he nonetheless served in the Confederate army for a year during the Civil War. After the war, he was appointed district attorney for the region, overseeing the chaotic and violent early Reconstruction era. Uncommon for the era, Dohoney supported gun control and women's suffrage.

District 11 election
Party	Candidate	Votes	%
Democratic	Ebenezer L. Dohoney	618	29.16%
Republican	R. Peterson	563	26.57%
Republican	J. M. Long	457	21.57%
Democratic	S. J. Spotts	299	14.11%
Write-in		182	8.59%
Total votes		2,119	100.0%
Democratic win			

=== District 12 ===
Radical Republican George Ruby was elected to represent the 12th district, based in Galveston, becoming, alongside Matthew Gaines, one of the first two African Americans elected to the Texas Senate. Prior to his election, Ruby had spent time in Haiti and New Orleans advocating for the rights of Black people. He moved to Galveston while working with the Freedmen's Bureau and quickly became prominent in Republican Party politics. He was also one of twelve African American members of the constitutional convention.

District 12 election
Party	Candidate	Votes	%
Republican	George Ruby	1,955	54.47%
Democratic	A. P. McCormick	1,634	45.53%
Total votes		3,589	100.0%
Republican win			

=== District 13 ===
Republican John G. Bell was elected to represent the 13th district. A veteran of the Seminole War, he was a staunch Unionist prior to the Civil War, although a level of involvement with the Confederacy forced him to take the Ironclad Oath before he could run for office.

District 13 election
Party	Candidate	Votes	%
Republican	John G. Bell	1,405	45.54%
Republican	R. K. Smith	1,161	37.63%
Democratic	T. S. McDade	410	13.29%
Democratic	W. E. Kendall	74	2.40%
Write-in		35	1.13%
Total votes		3,085	100.0%
Republican win			

=== District 14 ===
William Henry Parsons was elected to represent the 14th district, based in Harris County. A colonel in the Confederate Army, Parsons had staunchly supported states' rights before the war, publishing a newspaper to espouse his positions and attending the state's secession convention in 1860. Parsons commanded the 12th Texas Cavalry Regiment during the war, primarily fighting against the Union in Arkansas and Louisiana. By the time of his election to the Senate, however, Parsons had become a Radical Republican, arguing fervently for the passage of the 15th Amendment and denouncing the Democratic Party as traitors.

District 14 election
Party	Candidate	Votes	%
Republican	William H. Parsons	1,898	60.79%
Democratic	D. J. Baldwin	1,224	39.21%
Total votes		3,122	100.0%
Republican win			

=== District 15 ===
Republican John S. Mills of Grimes County was elected to represent the 15th district. A prominent member of the party, he had served as the vice president of their 1869 state convention.

District 15 election
Party	Candidate	Votes	%
Republican	John S. Mills	2,690	72.35%
Democratic	C. Caldwell	1,021	27.46%
Write-in		7	0.19%
Total votes		3,718	100.0%
Republican win			

=== District 16 ===
Radical Republican Matthew Gaines was elected to represent the 16th district, based in Galveston, becoming, alongside George Ruby, one of the first two African Americans elected to the Texas Senate. A freedman, Gaines was self-educated and became a minister. He was a firebrand for the rights of African Americans, especially regarding public education and integrated schooling.

District 16 election
Party	Candidate	Votes	%
Republican	Matthew Gaines	1,857	69.16%
Democratic	B. O. Watrous	808	30.09%
Independent	J. T. Swearinger	18	0.67%
Independent	William T. Clark	2	0.07%
Total votes		2,685	100.0%
Republican win			

=== District 17 ===
Radical Republican William A. Saylor was elected to represent the 17th district, based in Brazos County.

District 17 election
Party	Candidate	Votes	%
Republican	William A. Saylor	1,193	58.62%
Democratic	A. B. Cunningham	588	28.89%
Democratic	James Shaw	251	12.33%
Independent	A. Anderson	3	0.15%
Total votes		2,035	100.0%
Republican win			

=== District 18 ===
Radical Republican Phidello W. Hall of Robertson County was elected to represent the 18th district.

District 18 election
Party	Candidate	Votes	%
Republican	Phidello W. Hall	1,610	51.24%
Democratic	William Keigwin	1,532	48.76%
Total votes		3,142	100.0%
Republican win			

=== District 19 ===
Liberal Republican Andrew Jackson Evans was elected to represent the 19th district, based in McLennan County, but Radical Republican S. W. Ford successfully contested this result and took Evans' place in the Senate a few months into his term.

District 19 election
Party	Candidate	Votes	%
Republican	Andrew Jackson Evans	1,498	48.79%
Republican	S. W. Ford	1,330	43.32%
Democratic	C. R. Waters	242	7.88%
Total votes		3,070	100.0%
Republican win			

=== District 20 ===
Democrat William H. Pyle was elected to represent the 20th district, southeast of Dallas County. Pyle had served as a field surgeon in the Confederate Army during the Civil War.

District 20 election
Party	Candidate	Votes	%
Democratic	William H. Pyle	1,140	71.56%
Republican	J. H. Lippard	441	27.68%
Independent	Robert Hodge	12	0.75%
Total votes		1,593	100.0%
Democratic win			

=== District 21 ===
Conservative Independent Samuel Evans, a member of the Texas House of Representatives, was elected to represent the 21st district, based in Dallas and Tarrant counties. A farmer before the Civil War, Evans raised a company of cavalry for the Confederate Army. Evans defeated incumbent James K. Polk Record, one of the only members of the 11th legislature to run for re-election.

District 21 election
Party	Candidate	Votes	%
Independent	Samuel Evans	1,355	61.31%
Independent	James K. Polk Record (incumbent)	769	34.80%
Independent	B. F. Barkley	86	3.89%
Total votes		2,210	100.0%
Independent win			

=== District 22 ===
Conservative Independent Edward T. Broughton was elected to represent the 22nd district, northwest of Tarrant County, against members of both the Democratic and Republican parties. (Note: Which opponent belonged to which party is not clearly known. Assumptions are based on the political leanings of the district.) Broughton had served in the Confederate Army as a lieutenant colonel in the 7th Texas Infantry and later in Hood's Texas Brigade.

District 22 election
Party	Candidate	Votes	%
Independent	Edward T. Broughton	746	43.52%
Democratic	Thomas Kealey	572	33.37%
Republican	T. C. Bass	394	22.99%
Independent	Conner	2	0.12%
Total votes		1,714	100.0%
Independent win			

=== District 23 ===
Results by county Shannon: 60–70%; Welcher: 40–50%; 50–60%; Kirk: 40–50%; 80–90%; No votes: No votes

Democrat George R. Shannon, one of the earliest settlers of Johnson County, was elected to represent the 23rd district. A member of the Shannon political family, he succeeded his brother, William R. Shannon, who had represented the area during the 11th legislature.

District 23 election
Party	Candidate	Votes	%
Democratic	George R. Shannon	696	41.55%
Independent	B. F. Welcher	455	27.16%
Democratic	A. L. Kirk	249	14.87%
Republican	W. F. Carter	232	13.85%
Independent	J. G. Thomas	43	2.57%
Total votes		1,675	100.0%
Democratic win			

=== District 24 ===
Results by county Pridgen: 50–60%; 60–70%; White: 50–60%; 80–90%; >90%

Radical Republican Bolivar Jackson Pridgen of DeWitt County, a veteran of the Mexican–American War, was elected to represent the 24th district. He focused on policies which promoted the construction of railroads and public schools throughout the state.

District 24 election
Party	Candidate	Votes	%
Republican	Bolivar Jackson Pridgen	1,174	51.83%
Democratic	F. M. White	1,076	47.50%
Write-in		15	0.66%
Total votes		2,265	100.0%
Republican win			

=== District 25 ===
Republican Abner K. Foster was elected to represent the 25th district, consisting of Colorado and Lavaca Counties. A staunch Unionist, Foster had served in several roles during the state's military occupation, becoming very popular, but he died in March 1870, leaving the seat vacant for the remainder of the regular legislative session.

District 25 election
Party	Candidate	Votes	%
Republican	Abner K. Foster	1,689	62.63%
Democratic	J. D. Gilmore	935	34.67%
Independent	A. J. Vaughan	73	2.71%
Total votes		2,697	100.0%
Republican win			

=== District 26 ===
Republican Enoch Leach Alford was elected to represent the 26th district, although the Senate would later expel him in 1871 for siding with Democrats in a quorum bust against multiple parts of governor Edmund Davis' agenda.

District 26 election
Party	Candidate	Votes	%
Republican	Enoch Leach Alford	1,804	58.51%
Democratic	J. D. Sayers	968	31.40%
Independent	H. Ledbetter	311	10.09%
Total votes		3,083	100.0%
Republican win			

=== District 27 ===
Results by county Baker: 50–60%; Stell: 50–60%

Radical Republican Thomas H. Baker was elected to represent the 27th district. He had served the Confederacy during the Civil War, and he had served as a district judge prior to his election to the Senate. He defeated incumbent Jeptha Warren Stell, one of the only members of the 11th legislature to run for re-election.

District 27 election
Party	Candidate	Votes	%
Republican	Thomas H. Baker	1,318	50.69%
Democratic	Jeptha Warren Stell (incumbent)	1,265	48.65%
Write-in		17	0.65%
Total votes		2,600	100.0%
Republican win			

=== District 28 ===
Results by county Bowers: 50–60%; 70–80%; 80–90%; >90%; Talbot: 30–40%; No votes: No votes

Former state representative Marmion Henry Bowers was elected to represent the 28th district, based in Travis County. He had served in the Confederate Army prior to his election to the House. He lacked a direct partisan affiliation, although he consistently voted with the Democrats and was sometimes identified as one. He died in 1872 before the end of his term of tuberculosis.

District 28 election
Party	Candidate	Votes	%
Democratic	Marmion Henry Bowers	1,907	56.55%
Independent	J. B. McFarland	809	23.99%
Republican	Richard Talbot	646	19.16%
Write-in		10	0.30%
Total votes		3,372	100.0%
Democratic win			

=== District 29 ===
Results by county Hertzberg: 50–60%; 60–70%; King: 50–60%; 60–70%; >90%; No votes: No votes

Radical Republican Theodor Rudolph Hertzberg was elected to represent the 29th district, based in Bexar County. He also represented much of Texas Hill Country, serving as one of the earliest manifestations of the political power of the Texas Germans in the region.

District 29 election
Party	Candidate	Votes	%
Republican	Theodor Rudolph Hertzberg	1,871	53.92%
Democratic	Henry Clay King	1,597	46.02%
Write-in		2	0.06%
Total votes		3,470	100.0%
Republican win			

=== District 30 ===
Results by county Fountain: 50–60%; 60–70%; 70–80%; >90%; Thomas: 50–60%; 60–70%; >90%; Lujan: >90%; DeAvalon: 80–90%; >90%; King: >90%; No votes: No votes

Radical Republican Albert Jennings Fountain was elected to represent the 30th district, spanning the state's southern border with Mexico from the Rio Grande Valley to El Paso. His district far removed from the issues affecting the rest of the state, Fountain campaigned on securing El Paso's salt supply during the San Elizario Salt War. (Note: Despite this, Fountain received no votes from El Paso County, which instead cast most of its ballots for J. Lujan.) After the election, Fountain's opponents petitioned the Senate to remove him from office, accusing him of election fraud. After this failed, they brought felony charges against him alleging fraud during his time as El Paso Collector of Customs. He was later acquitted of these charges and served his full term in the Senate.

District 30 election
Party	Candidate	Votes	%
Republican	Albert Jennings Fountain	727	31.96%
Democratic	James B. Thomas	683	30.02%
Republican	J. Lujan	434	19.08%
Democratic	Alonzo A. DeAvalon	412	18.11%
Write-in		19	0.84%
Total votes		2,275	100.0%
Republican win			

== Bibliography ==
- Spaw, Patsy McDonald (February 1, 1999). The Texas Senate: Volume II, Civil War to the Eve of Reform, 1861-1889. Texas A&M University Press. ISBN 978-0-89096-857-4.
