= 1872 Texas Senate election =

- November 5, 1872

12 of the 30 seats in the Texas Senate 16 seats needed for a majority
	Majority party	Minority party	Third party
Party	Democratic	Republican	Independent
Last election	9	19	2
Seats before	10	18	2
Seats won	15	13	2 (Note: Both Independents are listed as Democrats in some sources)
Seat change	▲5	▼5	Steady
Popular vote	28,398	21,377	450
Percentage	56.54%	42.56%	0.90%
- Democratic hold Democratic gain Republican hold No election
President Pro Tempore before election
Webster Flanagan
Republican
Elected President Pro Tempore
Edward B. Pickett
Democratic

The 1872 Texas Senate elections took place as part of the biennial United States elections. Texas voters elected state senators in 10 of the 30 State Senate districts to six-year teams, as well as two more senators for unexpired terms in special elections. The winners of this election served in the 13th Texas Legislature. Democrats won a majority, which they would hold until after the 1996 elections.

== Background ==
Republicans won a majority of seats in the 1869 elections, and alongside their control of the House of Representatives and governorship, enacted a number of Reconstruction policies, including the ratification of the 14th and 15th amendments to the U.S. Constitution, a requirement for readmission to the Union and the resumption of congressional representation. They also elected Republicans Morgan C. Hamilton and James W. Flanagan to the U.S. Senate. On March 30, 1870, Texas was readmitted to the Union.

Following the state's readmission, the legislature turned towards state policy in a special session. The Radical Republican majority dramatically reshaped the state government, centralizing power, raising taxes, and overhauling the state's education system. Many of the state's new policies, especially the higher taxes and rights granted to freedmen, enraged the state's White population.

=== Rump Senate ===
The legislature created a state police force to address the rampant crime across the state, much of it perpetrated by white supremacist groups such as the Ku Klux Klan. The passage of this bill proved especially controversial, prompting conservative Senators to break quorum, leaving only 15 Radical Senators unable to pass legislation. The state then arrested the missing Senators, but only four were brought back to the chambers, enough to re-establish quorum. What became known as the "Rump Senate" then passed the bill. The education system became far more centralized, although it was segregated over the objections of the state's Black legislators. They also debated policies such as railroad construction and Native American removal.

=== Special elections ===
Democrats gained one seat during the legislative session after Republican Mijamin Priest was declared ineligible to serve. Democrat James Dillard won the ensuing special election, flipping the 3rd district. Republicans retained two of their own seats in other special elections held during the 12th legislature. Radical Republican Reinhard Hillebrand succeeded Enoch Leach Alford, who had been expelled for his role in a Democratic-led quorum bust, and Robert Tendick succeeded Abner Foster, who had died in March 1870.

Two more special elections were held concurrently with the general election. One seat became vacant due to the death of Senate President Pro Tempore Don Campbell died, and another when Republican Theodor Rudolph Hertzberg resigned to accept an appointment by governor Edmund J. Davis.

== Results ==
Democrats won control of the chamber with the help of the two conservative Independents who were not up for re-election, although they failed to win a majority of seats. Democratic control of the chamber would last until the 1996 elections.

== Detailed results by district ==
Candidates are not listed with political parties in the results. The parties of all victorious candidates are known, and the parties of others may be assumed by the presence of candidates running in the concurrent House election in the same district.

=== District 3 ===
District 3 election
Party	Candidate	Votes	%
Democratic	James Eldrage Dillard (incumbent)	1,769	61.36%
Republican	W. H. Waddell	742	25.74%
Independent	A. J. Coriplanck	372	12.90%
Total votes		2,883	100.0%
Democratic hold			

=== District 4 ===
District 4 election
Party	Candidate	Votes	%
Democratic	Thomas J. Word	2,352	63.07%
Republican	J. H. Morrison	1,377	36.93%
Total votes		3,729	100.0%
Democratic gain from Republican			

=== District 6 ===
District 6 election
Party	Candidate	Votes	%
Democratic	John Lane Henry	2,080	52.01%
Republican	J. W. Butler	1,919	47.99%
Total votes		3,999	100.0%
Democratic hold			

=== District 8 (special) ===
District 8 special election
Party	Candidate	Votes	%
Democratic	Hamilton Jacob Avinger	2,120	52.89%
Republican	John G. Boyle	1,888	47.11%
Total votes		4,008	100.0%
Democratic gain from Republican			

=== District 13 ===
District 13 election
Party	Candidate	Votes	%
Republican	Francis Gray Franks	1,875	45.43%
Democratic	E. G. Metze	1,352	32.76%
Republican	Walter Moses Burton	896	21.71%
Write-in		4	0.10%
Total votes		4,127	100.0%
Republican hold			

=== District 14 ===
District 14 election
Party	Candidate	Votes	%
Republican	James Glover Tracy	2,823	53.07%
Democratic	Charles Bellinger Stewart	2,496	46.93%
Total votes		5,319	100.0%
Republican hold			

=== District 15 ===
District 15 election
Party	Candidate	Votes	%
Republican	Edward T. Randle	3,115	54.85%
Democratic	G. M. Patrick	2,539	44.71%
Independent	Travis Henderson	24	0.42%
Write-in		1	0.02%
Total votes		5,679	100.0%
Republican hold			

=== District 23 ===
District 23 election
Party	Candidate	Votes	%
Democratic	Andrew J. Ball	1,690	61.32%
Democratic	George R. Shannon (incumbent)	787	28.56%
Republican	J. C. Rushing	237	8.60%
Independent	Thomas H. Hickox	39	1.42%
Write-in		3	0.11%
Total votes		2,756	100.0%
Democratic hold			

=== District 24 ===
District 24 election
Party	Candidate	Votes	%
Democratic	George Preston Finlay	1,805	55.92%
Republican	F. E. Grothaus	1,423	44.08%
Total votes		3,228	100.0%
Democratic gain from Republican			

=== District 26 ===
District 26 election
Party	Candidate	Votes	%
Democratic	Joseph D. Sayers	2,269	51.97%
Republican	F. Seydler	2,096	48.01%
Write-in		1	0.02%
Total votes		4,366	100.0%
Democratic gain from Republican			

=== District 28 ===
District 28 election
Party	Candidate	Votes	%
Democratic	Nathan George Shelley	4,645	72.86%
Republican	James Davidson	1,724	27.04%
Write-in		6	0.09%
Total votes		6,375	100.0%
Democratic hold			

=== District 29 (special) ===
District 29 special election
Party	Candidate	Votes	%
Democratic	Henry Clay King	2,494	66.40%
Republican	J. W. VanShyle	1,262	33.60%
Total votes		3,756	100.0%
Democratic gain from Republican			
