= 12th Texas Legislature =

The 12th Texas Legislature met from February 8, 1870, to December 2, 1871, in four sessions — provisional, called, regular, and adjourned. It took up a martial law bill. Republicans were in the majority or the Reconstruction era body including some African Americans.

== Senate ==
There were incidents with Indian marauders and cattle thieves in Texas and on May 6, 1870, Senator Theodor Rudolph Hertzberg introduced a bill to reorganize the state militia. The bill included provisions for a unique "state guard" and for martial law. David Webster Flanagan who had for years been a staunch Radical Republican opposed the bill because of its clauses allowing Governor Edmund J. Davis to impose martial law. The cost was also the reason why some Republicans opposed the bill, but Senator Matthew Gaines, an African American, believed that racism was the reason for opposition, since many of the "state guard" would be black.

On May 17, at a Republican caucus, Senators Bolivar Jackson Pridgen and E. L. Alford announced their opposition to the bill and were thrown out of the meeting. Governor Davis announced that he would veto any bills which came across his desk before his militia legislation. Flanagan then offered to support the state militia bill if Governor Davis supported a railroad bill, but Davis publicly refused.

On June 16, 1870, Flanagan put forward a substitute militia bill without the martial law sections, but it failed to pass. Senator Mijamin Priest then publicly supported a bill which had passed the house, which would have suspended the writ of habeas corpus. In a public debate on June 17, Priest said that Texas was in a state of war with Indians and bandits, insisting that "a desperate disease requires a desperate remedy."

On June 21, Flanagan attempted to introduce his previous defeated bill as an alternative to the house bill which suspended the writ of habeas corpus. This motion failed. Flanagan then attempted to adjourn. According to a sworn statement by Parsons, Senator Fountain moved for a vote on the bill by roll. Thirteen Senators, Marmion Henry Bowers, Flanagan, Alford, E. Thomas Broughton, Amos Clark, David W. Cole, Ebenezer Lafayette Dohoney, James Postell Douglas, Andrew J. Evans, Henry Russell Latimer, Edward Bradford Pickett, William H. Pyle, and George R. Shannon, withdrew from the chamber to prevent the presence of a quorum and to prevent passage of the bill, to a nearby Capitol committee room.

The Senate rule at the time, as it is today, states that the sergeant-at-arms could be sent to arrest absent senators to secure a quorum. The Senate sergeant-at-arms was sent to retrieve them with instructions to retrieve at least four senators, the number required for a quorum. Because the senators had locked the door, the sergeant-at-arms flung himself through a committee room window despite the efforts of the Senators to close the shutter on him. The sergeant-at-arms convinced the senators to return to the chamber. The Radical Republicans then had their opponents arrested. Nine were immediately arrested, but four of the Senators remained, so the Senate could form a quorum. The Rump Senate then moved forward the militia bill. The next day, one of the Senators pleaded illness, so one of the jailed senators was released so the militia bill could be passed.

The term Rump Senate is applied to the fifteen Radical Republican members of the Twelfth Texas Legislature, the term is a variation of "rump legislature". It is the only time in history where senators were arrested under a "call of the Senate" and were then prohibited from rejoining their fellow senators and participating in Senate votes.

During the confinement the Rump Senate took full advantage of their absence to pass as many of Governor Davis's bills as could be rushed through legislature. The House bill to establish a state police was passed on June 28, 1870. The Senate confirmed James Davidson as adjutant general who later stole thirty thousand dollars of state money.

Several senators were held under arrest for three weeks while the Rump Senate passed the legislation and began hearings against the senators for not only walking out of the chamber, but for other allegations, including bribery for Senate votes. Flanagan, who was responsible for most of the incident, was too powerful a figure to be penalized. But Senator E. L. Alford of La Grange lost his Senate seat after an investigatory committee ruled that he "did, in contempt of the Senate, violently resist said arrest, and did forcibly close the shutters, and did refuse to submit to said arrest by the Sergeant-at-arms."

As soon as he was released from jail, Alford continued to take his seat in the Senate, and even after the special election, refused to give up his seat. Reinhard Hillebrand, his elected replacement, had to wait in the wings.

== Sessions ==
- 12th Provisional session: February 8–24, 1870

Legislative members eligible to take the qualifying oath were required to convene February 8, 1870, to ratify the Fourteenth and Fifteenth Amendments to the United States Constitution in order for Texas to be readmitted to the Union, and to elect two U.S. Senators. Both houses of the legislature were required to adjourn daily until all members had qualified.

- 12th Called session: April 26–August 15, 1870
- 12th Regular session: January 10–May 31, 1871
- 12th Adjourned session: September 12–December 2, 1871

== Officers ==
=== Senate ===
Lieutenant Governor
James W. Flanagan (Provisional)
President pro tempore (Lieutenant Governor ex officio)
Donald Campbell, Republican, Called Session, Regular Session
David Webster Flanagan, Republican, Adjourned Session
Albert Jennings Fountain, Republican, Adjourned Session
David Webster Flanagan, Republican, Adjourned Session

Flanagan was elected Lieutenant Governor in 1869. He was declared "Provisional Lieutenant Governor" by Special Order No. 6, Fifth Military District, on January 8, 1870, and presided over the Provisional session of the Senate. During that session, he was elected to the U.S. Senate and was never sworn in as Lieutenant Governor.

=== House of Representatives ===
Speaker of the House
Ira Hobart Evans, Republican, 1870–1871
William Henry Sinclair, Republican, 1871–1873

== Members ==
Senate membership of the 12th legislature by district Republican member (19) Democratic member (9) Independent member (2)

Members of the Twelfth Texas Legislature at the beginning of the provisional session, February 8, 1870:

=== Senate ===
District	Senator	Party	Took office
1	Pickett, Edward Bradford	Democratic	1870
2	Clark, Amos	Democratic	1870
3	Priest, Mijamin	Republican	1870
4	Pettit, E.	Republican	1870
5	Flanagan, David Webster	Republican	1870
6	Douglas, James Postell	Democratic	1870
7	Rawson, Henry	Republican	1870
8	Campbell, Donald	Republican	1870
9	Latimer, Henry Russell	Democratic	1870
10	Cole, David W.	Democratic	1870
11	Dohoney, Ebenezer Lafayette	Democratic	1870
12	Ruby, George Thompson	Republican	1870
13	Bell, John G.	Republican	1870
14	Parsons, William Henry	Republican	1870
15	Mills, John S.	Republican	1870
16	Gaines, Matthew	Republican	1870
17	Saylor, William A.	Republican	1870
18	Hall, Phidello W.	Republican	1870
19	Evans, Andrew J.	Republican	1870
20	Pyle, William H.	Democratic	1870
21	Samuel Evans	Independent (Note: Listed without party affiliation in the 12th legislature, later identified as a Democrat.)	1870
22	Broughton, E. Thomas	Independent	1870
23	Shannon, George R.	Democratic	1870
24	Pridgen, Bolivar Jackson	Republican	1870
25	Foster, Abner K.	Republican	1870
26	Alford, E. L.	Republican	1870
27	Baker, Thomas H.	Republican	1870
28	Bowers, Marmion Henry	Democratic	1870
29	Hertzberg, Theodor Rudolph	Republican	1870
30	Fountain, Albert Jennings	Republican	1870

- Petit did not attend the Provisional Session. He was sworn in on February 26, 1870, at the beginning of the Called Session.
- Evans refused to qualify on February 8, 1870, but did qualify and was sworn in on February 10, 1870.

=== House of Representatives ===
- Joseph Abbott
- Richard Allen
- James Buckner Barry
- D. W. Burley
- James Reid Cole
- Giles Cotton
- J. Goldsteen Dupree
- Ira Hobart Evans
- Francis Gray Franks
- Jeremiah J. Hamilton
- Gustav Hoffmann
- Orlando Newton Hollingsworth
- Mitchell Kendall
- Fergus Kyle
- David Medlock
- John Mitchell
- Henry Moore
- Shepherd Mullens
- Henry Phelps
- Julius Schuetze
- William Sheriff
- William Henry Sinclair
- William F. Schlottmann
- Benjamin Franklin Williams
- Richard Williams

== Membership changes ==
District	Outgoing Senator	Reason for Vacancy	Successor	Date of Successor's Installation
District 2	Amos Clark (D)	Clark died February 18, 1871	William H. Swift (D)	after October 6, 1871
District 3	Mijamin Priest (R)	Priest resigned August 15, 1870	James Eldrage Dillard (D)	January 10, 1871
District 3	James Eldrage Dillard (D)	Dillard declared ineligible April 10, 1871	James Eldrage Dillard (D)	October 31, 1871
District 14	William Henry Parsons (R)	Parsons resigned December 4, 1871.	Vacant	
District 19	Andrew J. Evans (R)	Evans unseated in election contest February 18, 1870.	S. W. Ford (R)	February 18, 1870
District 25	Abner K. Foster (R)	Foster died March 9, 1870.	Robert P. Tendick (R)	January 10, 1871
District 26	E. L. Alford (R)	Alford was expelled for resisting arrest during the call of the session.	Reinhard Hillebrand (R)	February 17, 1871
District 28	Marmion Henry Bowers (D)	Bowers died March 3, 1872 of tuberculosis.	Vacant	
District 29	Theodor Rudolph Hertzberg (R)	Hertzberg resigned December 2, 1871.	Vacant	

- District 2: Swift elected in special election October 3–6, 1871.
- District 3: Dillard elected in special election November 28–December 1, 1870.
- District 3: Dillard reelected in special election October 3–6, 1871.
- District 26: Hillebrand elected in special election November 28–December 1, 1870.

== See also ==
- Rump legislature
