= Sheppard Mullens =

American politician

Sheppard Mullens, sometimes spelled Shepart Mullins or Shepherd Mullens, (1829 – August 7, 1871) was an African American public official and state legislator in Texas. He served one term in the Texas House of Representatives and also served as a delegate to the state's 1868 Constitutional Convention.

== Early life ==
He was enslaved from birth in Lawrence County, Alabama in 1829. He labored as a blacksmith and was taken to Texas in 1854.

He and fellow African American Texas state legislators Giles Cotton and Dave Medlock were from Limestone County when black Texans were emancipated.

He married Sallie Downs December 29, 1866. In 1869 Major General Joseph J. Reynolds, military commander of Texas, appointed Mullens to a four-year term as a McLennan county commissioner in 1869. He was buried at the First Street Cemetery in Waco.

== Political career ==
He was a delegate at the 1867 Texas Constitutional Convention.

He attended the "Morgan Hamilton" Republican Convention in Texas in 1869. He lived in Bosque at the time.

He served in the Texas House of Representatives from 1870-1871.

== See also ==
- African American officeholders from the end of the Civil War until before 1900
