= Senator Alford =

Senator Alford may refer to:

- Enoch Leach Alford (1829–1912), Texas State Senate
- Mitchell Cary Alford (1855–1914), Kentucky State Senate

== See also ==
- Jerry Alvord, Oklahoma State Senate
