= Benjamin O. Watrous =

Texas politician

Benjamin O. Watrous(1819-?) was a wheelwright, minister, constitutional convention delegate, and state legislator in Texas. He was African American. He was known as Ben Carter when he was young. He was a Republican. He campaigned for a state senate seat in 1869 but lost to Matthew Gaines.

He was born in McMinn County, Tennessee. He was enslaved.

Carrie Watrous was his wife. He was a member of the Union Loyal League and Texas House of Councils.

He lost the vote to become speaker of the Texas House of Representatives by three votes. He was one of 52 African-American men who were in the Texas legislature or were delegates to the 1868-1869 Texas Constitutional Convention.

== See also ==
- African American officeholders from the end of the Civil War until before 1900
