= Mitchell Kendall =

Texas state representative

Texas House of Representatives
- In office 1870–1871

Personal details
- Born: c. 1822 Georgia
- Died: 1885 (aged 62–63) Marshall, Texas
- Party: Republican

Mitchell M. Kendall (c. 1822–c. 1885) was a blacksmith and state legislator in Texas for Harrison County, Texas. Kendall was born in Georgia as a slave in 1822 and was brought to Texas around 1850. He served as a voter registrar in Harrison County. At the 1868 Texas Constitutional Convention he voted to separate Texas into three states. He was later elected as a Republican to the Texas House of Representatives for the Twelfth Legislature from 1870 to 1871.

The 1880 federal census reported stated that Kendall lived with his wife, Adeline, and his five children.

Kendall was a member of the Ebenezer United Methodist Church in New Town neighborhood of Marshall, Texas. He was buried at the Old Powder Mill Cemetery in Marshall.
