= William F. Schlottmann =

American politician

Willam F. Schlottmann
- Born: October 4, 1824; Oppendorf, Province of Westphalia, Prussia
- Died: April 11, 1903 (aged 78); Washington County, Texas
- Burial place: Salem Evangelical Lutheran Church Cemetery, Brenham, Texas
- Spouse: Elizabeth Richter

Willam F. Schlottmann (October 4, 1824 – April 11, 1903) was a Civil War Confederate soldier in the 5th Regiment Texas Infantry, and also a member of the 12th Texas state legislature from 1870 to 1873. As a representative in the Texas legislature, he was a member of the Federal Relations, Roads/Bridges and Ferries, and Public Debt committees. Schlottmann migrated from Oppendorf, Westphalia, Prussia to Texas in the Fall of 1847 and arrived at Washington on the Brazos. He made his home in Brenham, Texas and married Elizabeth Richter on December 13, 1850. They had 5 daughters and 1 son. Schlottmann died on April 11, 1903, in Washington County and was buried at Salem Evangelical Lutheran Church Cemetery in Brenham.
