= Casino Club =

Historic club in San Antonio, Texas

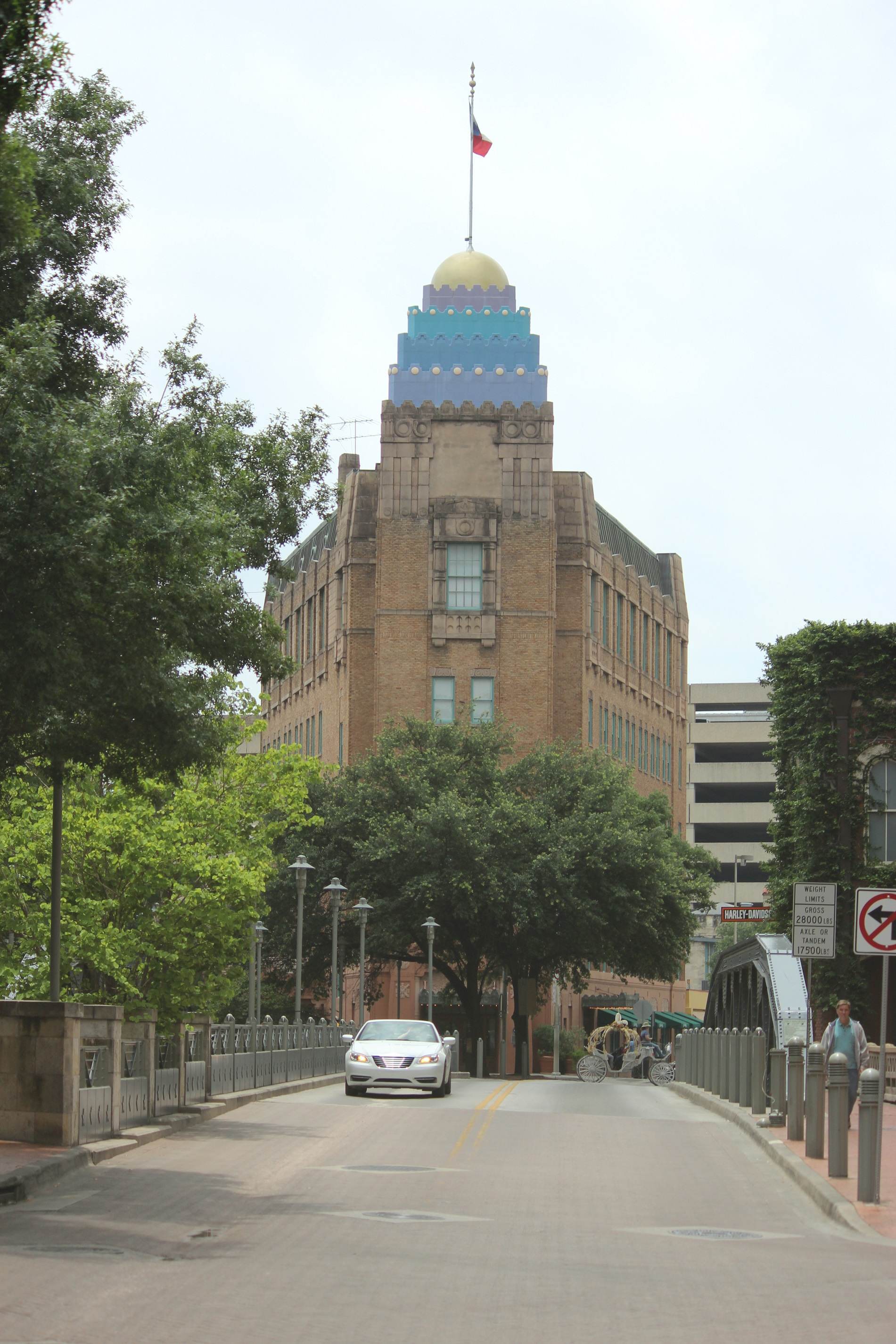

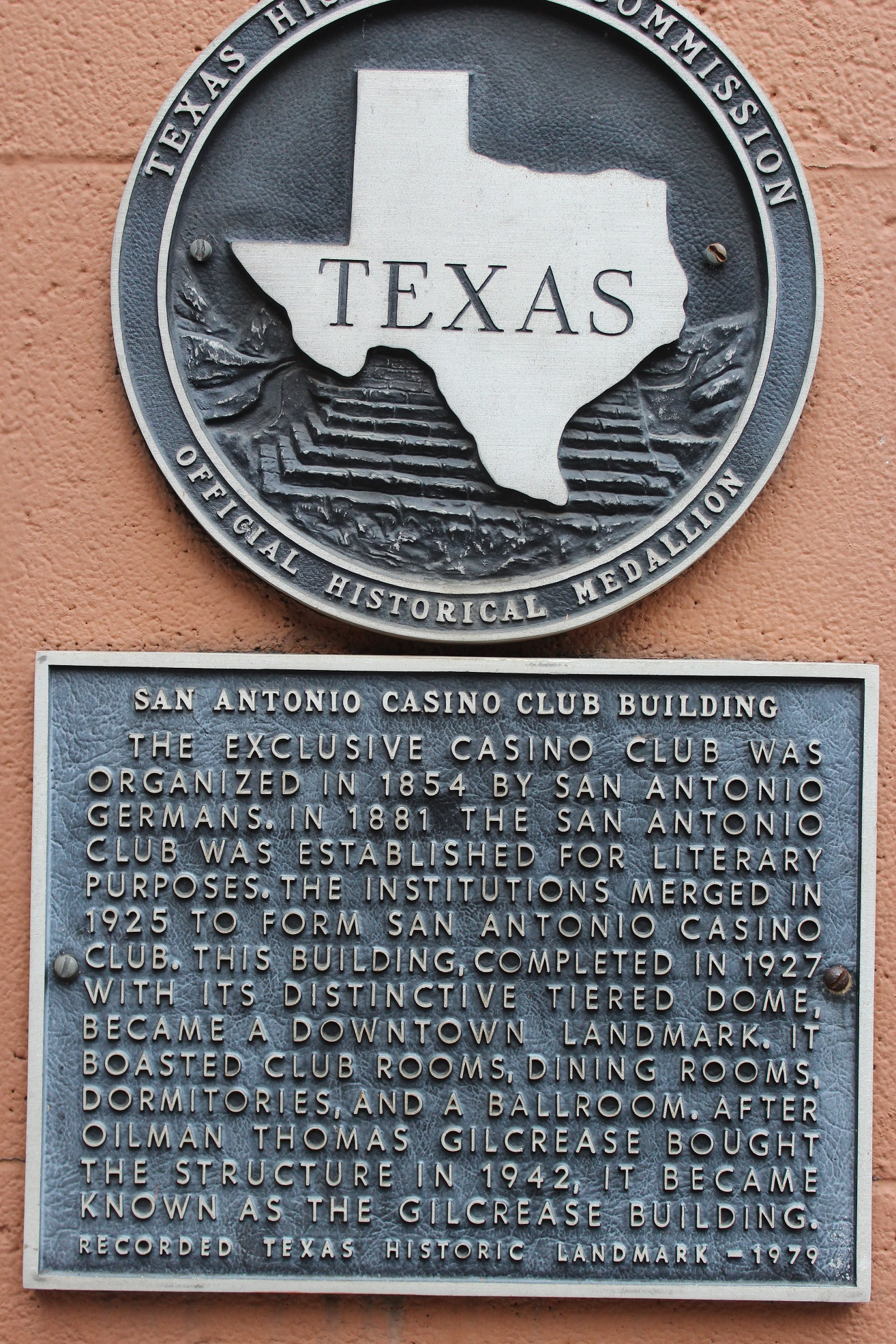

The Casino Club is a historic German-American social club in San Antonio, Texas. It was established in 1854 with gatherings of 20 German-Americans and chartered in 1857 with 106 members. The club debuted a building known as Casino Hall on Market Street in 1858, which was designed by future mayor Wilhelm Thielepape. It merged with the San Antonio Club, a literary society, in 1881. In 1923, during prohibition, the club's building was sold.

In 1927 a new building for the club was completed. It features a distinctive tiered dome.

Thomas Gilcrease purchased the building in 1942, and it became known as the Gilcrease Building. In the 1940s, Gilcrease relocated his offices and art collection to Tulsa. The building was mostly empty from 1950 until 1970. It was converted to an apartment building and its basement renovated for use as a restaurant. It is a Texas Historical Landmark.

The community organized a German-English School. Prominent members of the club included Conrad Alexander Goeth, Theodor Rudolph Hertzberg, and Albert and Ernst Steves. Albert Steves served as Mayor Pro Tem of San Antonio. Goeth was a lawyer and civic leader from a prominent family. The Steves family lived in Comfort before settling in San Antonio.

The original Casino Hall building was torn down in 1961. Its site is now a park.

== Gallery ==
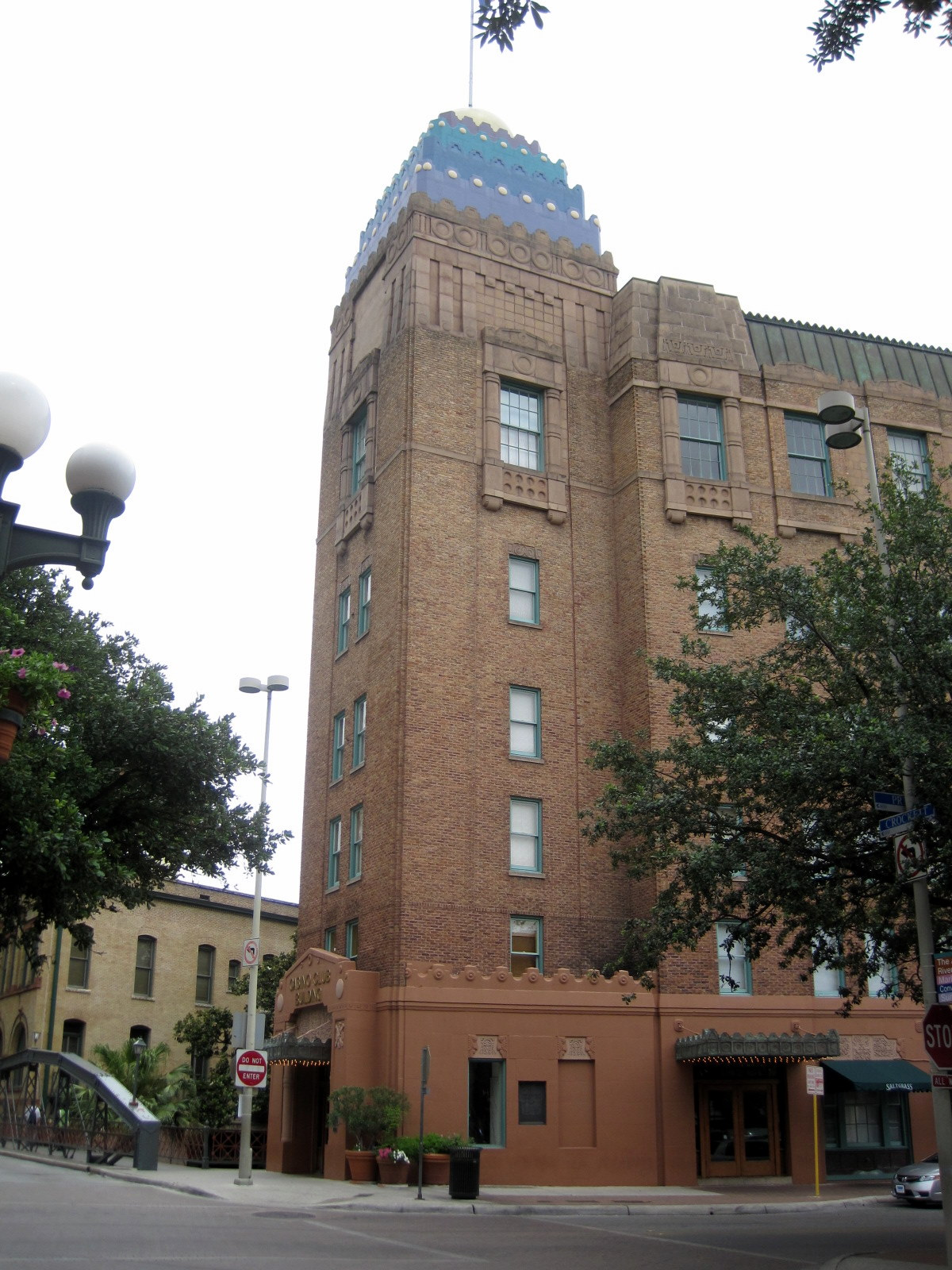
Side view

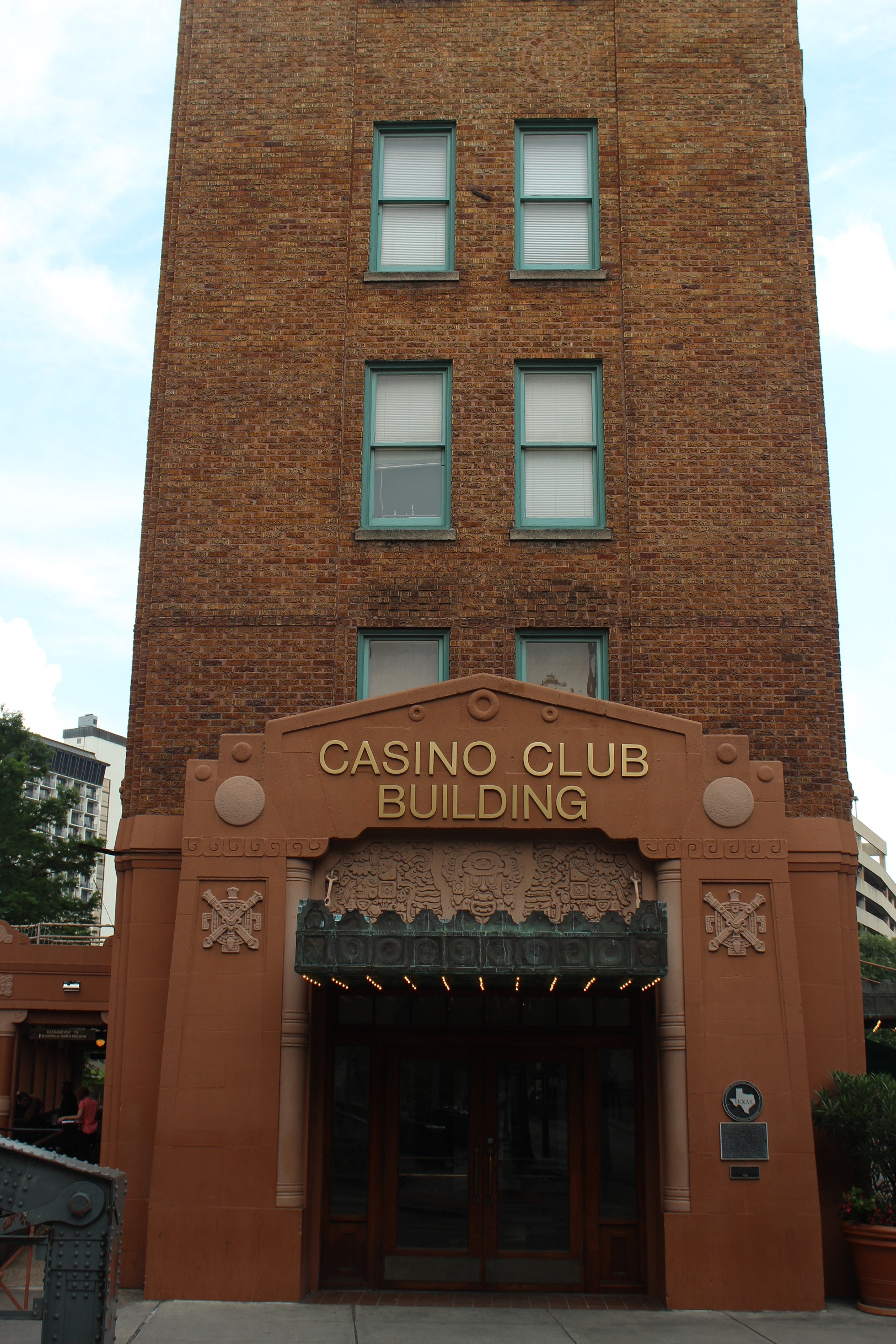
Entrance

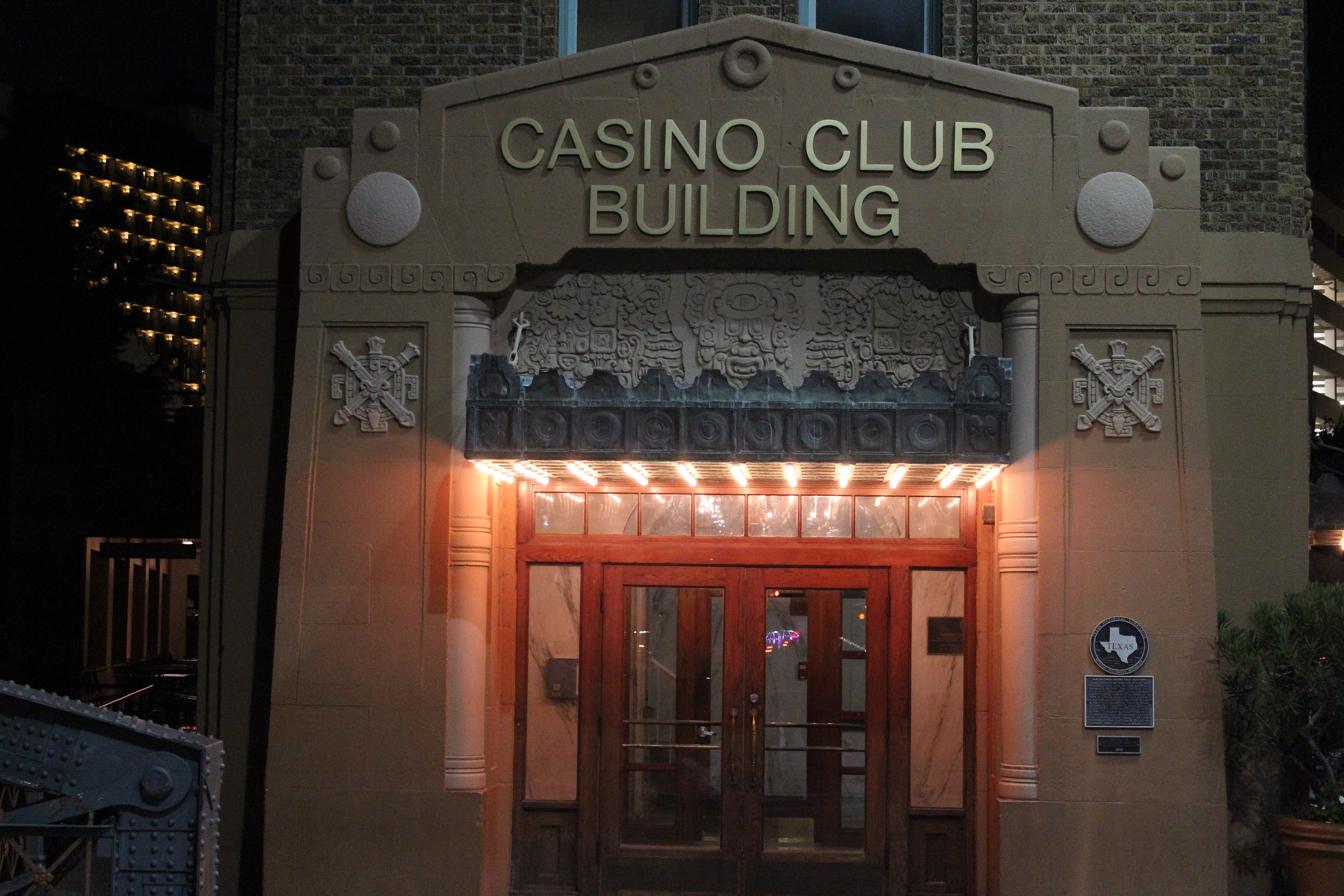
At night

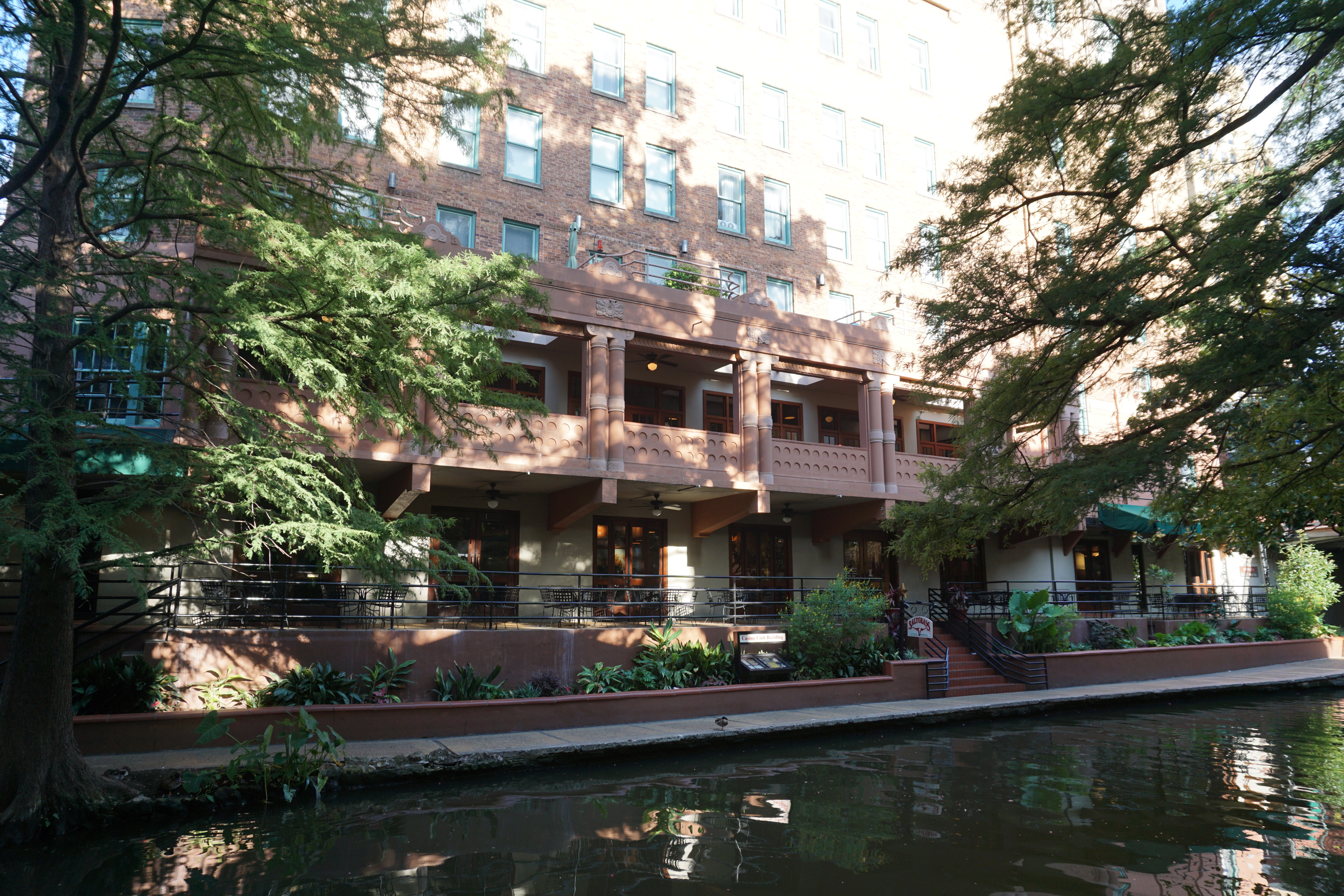
View from the San Antonio River Walk
