= Rump legislature =

Legislature formed by members originally elected to office

A rump legislature is a legislature formed of part, usually a minority, of the legislators originally elected or appointed to office.

The word "rump" normally refers to the back end of an animal; its use meaning "remnant" was first recorded in the context of the 17th-century Rump Parliament in England. Since 1649, the term "rump parliament" has been used to refer to any parliament left over after the true parliament has formally dissolved.

In the United States in the 19th century, upon the secession of Virginia from the union on April 27, 1861, anti-secessionist legislators convened a rump legislature and formed a pro-Union reformed government which claimed to represent all of Virginia. This reformed government authorized the creation of the state of Kanawha, later renamed West Virginia.

By contrast, the Legislative Yuan of Republic of China (Taiwan) between 1951 and 1991, having been relocated from Nanking to Taipei when the Republic of China lost mainland China in late 1949, contained members originally elected from mainland constituencies who could not be replaced. The pre-reform Legislative Yuan was nevertheless widely regarded as a rump legislature, controlling only a fraction of the territory it claimed to represent.

Irish republican legitimists regarded the Second Dáil elected in 1921 as the last legitimate Irish legislature, arguing it never formally yielded its authority to the 3rd Dáil elected in June 1922. The rump Second Dáil held symbolic meetings a few times from October 1922. Members died or defected to the Oireachtas of the Irish Free State until, in 1938, the remaining seven yielded their notional authority to the IRA Army Council.

== See also ==
- Rump Parliament
- Rump Senate, 1870 Texas case
- Rump state
- Rump party
