= D. W. Burley =

American politician from Texas

Texas House of Representatives
- In office 1870–1873

Personal details
- Born: c. 1844 Virginia, US
- Died: Unknown
- Party: Republican

D. W. Burley was an American state legislator in Texas. He served in the Texas House of Representatives. He was in St. Louis during the American Civil War and moved to Texas after it. He was elected in 1870 and only lasted one term.

He was born enslaved. He lived in Calvert, Texas. He represented Robertson County, Leon County, and Freestone County.

== See also ==
- African American officeholders from the end of the Civil War until before 1900
- 12th Texas Legislature
