= Abner K. Foster =

American politician (1826–1870)

Abner K. Foster (1826–1870) was a member of the Texas Senate. A Republican, he was elected in the 1869 Texas Senate election.

== Bibliography ==
- Spaw, Patsy McDonald (February 1, 1999). The Texas Senate: Volume II, Civil War to the Eve of Reform, 1861-1889. Texas A&M University Press. ISBN 978-0-89096-857-4.
