= Samuel B. Maxey =

American politician (1825–1895)

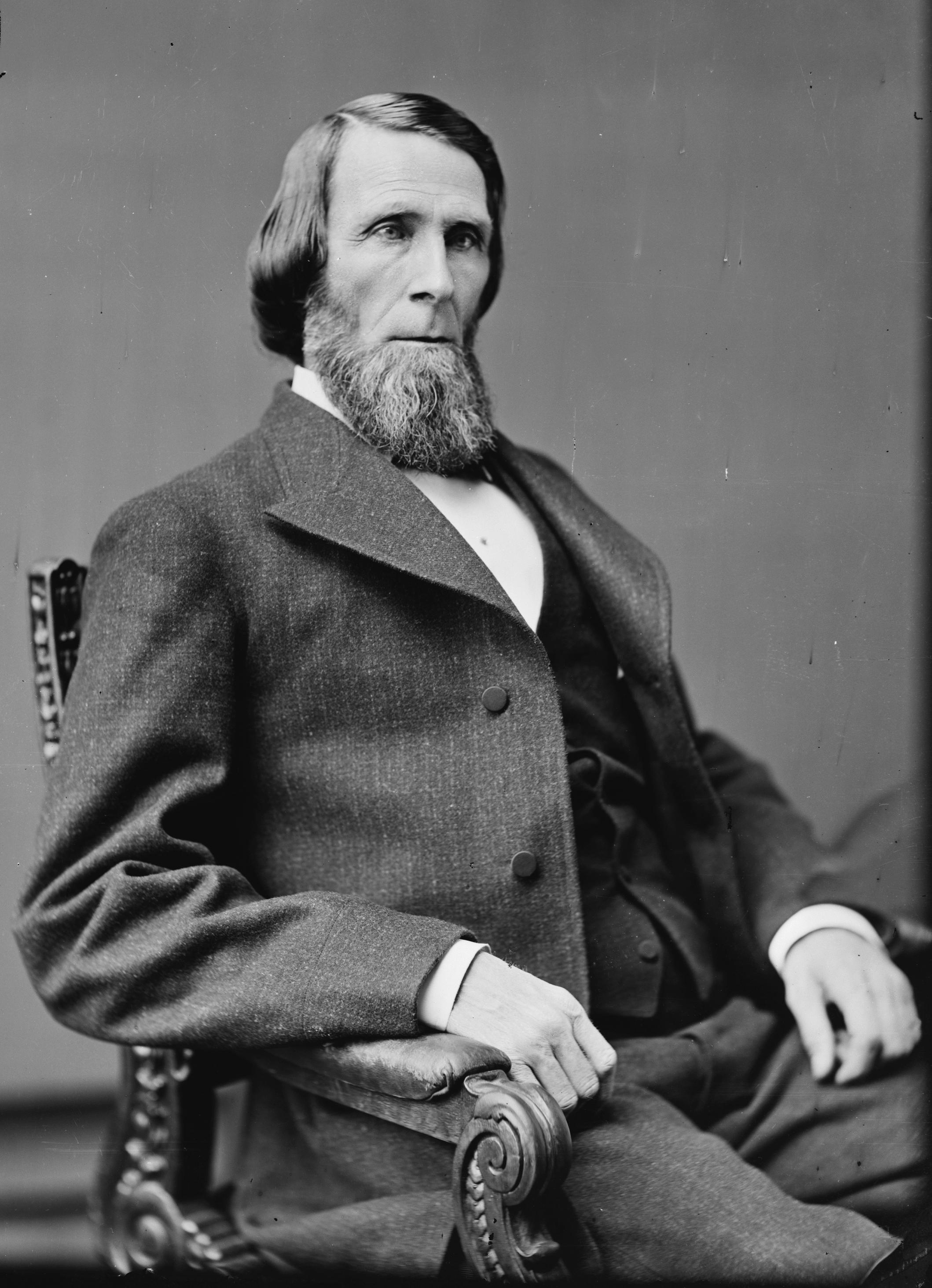

United States Senator from Texas
- In office March 4, 1875 – March 3, 1887
- Preceded by: James W. Flanagan
- Succeeded by: John H. Reagan

Member of the Texas Senate from the 9th district
- In office 1861
- Preceded by: Jesse H. Parsons
- Succeeded by: Rice Maxey

Personal details
- Born: March 30, 1825 Tompkinsville, Kentucky, U.S.
- Died: August 16, 1895 (aged 70) Eureka Springs, Arkansas, U.S.
- Resting place: Evergreen Cemetery; Paris, Texas, U.S.
- Party: Democratic
- Education: United States Military Academy (BS)

Military service
- Allegiance: United States; Confederate States of America
- Branch/service: United States Army; Confederate States Army
- Years of service: 1846–1849 (USA); 1861–1865 (CSA)
- Rank: Brevet First Lieutenant (USA); Major General (CSA)
- Battles/wars: Mexican–American War; American Civil War

Samuel Bell Maxey (March 30, 1825 – August 16, 1895) was an American soldier, lawyer, and politician from Paris, Texas. He was a brigadier general in the Confederate States Army during the American Civil War and later represented Texas in the U.S. Senate.

== Early life and education ==
Maxey was born in Tompkinsville, Kentucky, on March 30, 1825. His parents were Rice and Lucy (Bell) Maxey. His father was a lawyer, and in 1834 he moved the family to Albany, Kentucky, to take a position as the County Clerk for Clinton County, Kentucky. In 1842 young Maxey got an appointment to the United States Military Academy at West Point, New York.

Although he consistently ranked near the bottom of his class, Maxey did graduate in 1846 and was commissioned a Brevet second lieutenant.

== Career ==
Maxey was assigned to the 7th Infantry Regiment, which was engaged in the Mexican–American War. Maxey joined the regiment in Monterrey, Mexico. Maxey was cited for gallantry and brevetted first lieutenant for his actions in the battles of Cerro Gordo and Contreras in the summer of 1847. He also participated in the battles of Churubusco and Molino del Rey. He received a brevet promotion and was placed in command of a police company in Mexico City.

In June 1848 Maxey was transferred to Jefferson Barracks in Missouri, and the following year he resigned from the army. He returned to Albany, read law with his father Rice Maxey and they began a joint practice when Maxey was admitted to the Bar in 1851. He married Marilda Cass Denton on June 19, 1853. In October 1857, father and son moved their families to a small farm they purchased just south of Paris, Texas. They resumed a joint law practice here as well.

=== American Civil War ===
Maxey was elected the district attorney for Lamar County, Texas, in 1858 and was a delegate to the state's Secession Convention in 1861. That same year he was elected to the state Senate, but never served, preferring military duty. His father, Rice Maxey, was elected to replace him. Maxey had been given authority by the Confederate government in September to raise a regiment as its colonel.

In December, Maxey led his 1,120-man Ninth Texas Regiment from Bonham, Texas, to join General Johnston at Memphis, Tennessee. However he was soon separated from his regiment and set to building bridges near Chattanooga, Tennessee. On March 7, 1862, Maxey was promoted to brigadier general to rank from May 4. The regiment was badly mauled at the Battle of Shiloh, but he was not present. In fact he saw very little action during this period. He did see action at the Siege of Port Hudson in 1863.

In December 1863, Maxey was assigned as commander of the Indian Territory. His early success in conducting raids and capturing supplies prevented a Union Army invasion of Texas. He was assigned to duty as a major general by General Edmund Kirby Smith, but this appointment was never approved for this rank by Confederate President Jefferson Davis nor confirmed by the Confederate Senate. In 1865 he was ordered to Houston, Texas, to take command of a Division. He turned over command of the Indian Territory to Brigadier General Stand Watie, a Cherokee, on February 21, 1865, and proceeded to Houston, Texas.

Maxey's new command was plagued by desertions and his inability to get supplies and equipment. Frustrated and discouraged, he was allowed to resign on May 22, 1865. He returned home to Paris, and formally surrendered in July to Union Major General Edward Canby (E.R.S. Canby). Although nominally a prisoner of war, he remained at home on parole.

=== Later political career ===
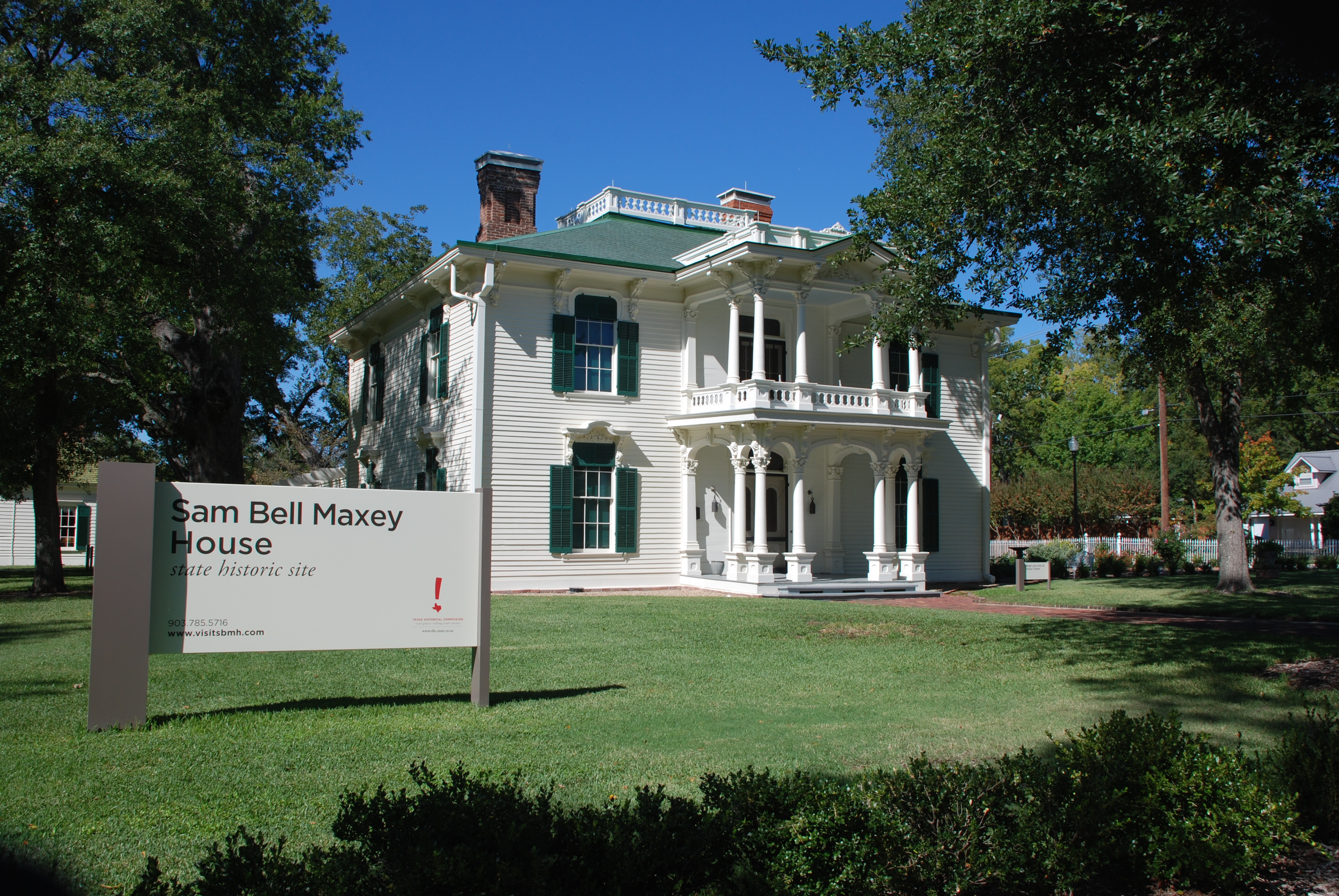
Sam Bell Maxey House in Paris, Texas

As a senior officer of the Confederacy, Maxey was not eligible to hold political office or even practice law. In October 1865 he began his appeal for a presidential pardon. He was finally successful when President Andrew Johnson pardoned him on July 20, 1867, after a personal appeal from Maxey's former West Point classmate Ulysses S. Grant. He resumed the practice of law in Paris.

In 1872 he ran for the U.S. Congress, but lost in the Democratic Party Primary to William P. McLean. In 1873, Governor Edmund J. Davis offered Maxey an appointment to the Texas District Court, but he declined due to prior involvement as a lawyer with cases before the court.

In January 1875, the Texas Legislature elected him to the United States Senate where he served two terms, from March 4, 1875, until March 3, 1887. He improved postal and rail service in Texas and argued against increased tariffs. He took little interest in larger national or party affairs. The legislature named the more dynamic John H. Reagan to replace him.

Maxey returned to the practice of law in Paris, this time with his wife's nephew Benjamin Denton and Henry William Lightfoot. The latter of the two later married Maxey's adopted daughter Dora Maxey. When his nephew, Sam Bell Maxey Long, joined the firm in 1892 he finally retired. He died on August 16, 1895, at Eureka Springs, Arkansas, where he had gone for treatment of an intestinal problem. Maxey was buried at Evergreen Cemetery in Paris, Texas. The townhouse that he built there in 1867 is now a state historical site on South Church Street and is open to visitors.

== Legacy ==
Camp Maxey was a World War II infantry-training camp and associated facilities, named in honor of Maxey. It was occupied from July 1942 to early 1946 in Lamar County, Texas, near Paris, Texas. It now serves as a National Guard training center.

== See also ==
- List of American Civil War generals (Confederate)

== Notes ==
Texas Senate
Preceded by Jesse H. Parsons	Texas State Senator from District 9 (Paris); 1861	Succeeded by Rice Maxey
U.S. Senate
Preceded by James W. Flanagan	U.S. senator (Class 1) from Texas; 1875—1887; Served alongside: Morgan C. Hamilton, Richard Coke	Succeeded by John H. Reagan
