= 1861 Texas secession referendum =

Texas Secession Referendum
- February 23, 1861
- Ordinance of Secession

Results
| Choice | Votes | % |
|---|---|---|
| For | 46,153 | 75.78% |
| Against | 14,747 | 24.22% |
| Total votes | 60,900 | 100.00% |
County results
Yes
50%–60%
60%–70%
70%–80%
80%–90%
90%–100%
No
50%–60%
60–70%
70–80%
80–90%
90–100%

The 1861 Texas secession referendum, or the Texas Ordinance of Secession was a statewide plebiscite held on February 23, 1861, to decide whether Texas should secede from the United States. It was the only such referendum held by a seceding state in the "First Wave" of secession (the seven states that left before the Battle of Fort Sumter). The referendum resulted in a landslide victory in favor of secession, with roughly 76% of voters favoring withdrawal from the Union.

== Background ==
The election of Abraham Lincoln in November 1860 triggered a political crisis in Texas. The victory of Abraham Lincoln and the Republican Party, which ran on a platform of preventing the expansion of slavery, was viewed by Texas secessionists not merely as a political defeat, but as a "revolutionary" act that invalidated the federal compact. While Governor Sam Houston was a staunch Unionist, many state leaders viewed the Republican victory as a direct threat to the institution of slavery and state sovereignty. Despite Houston’s refusal to call a special session of the legislature, secessionist leaders organized an unofficial election in early January to select delegates for a Secession Convention.

Frustrated by Governor Houston's obstruction, secessionist leaders issued a "call to the people," bypassing Houston to organize elections for a Secession Convention. These elections were held on January 8, 1861. Houston eventually succumbed to political pressure and called the legislature into special session on January 21, but by that time, the convention had already been organized. On January 28, the convention assembled in Austin and claimed the authority to act as the sovereign voice of the people of Texas. On February 1, the delegates approved the Ordinance of Secession by a vote of 166 to 8.

To ensure the move was seen as legally and democratically legitimate, and to appease Governor Houston, the convention agreed to submit the ordinance to a popular vote. On February 2, the convention issued a "Declaration of Causes," explicitly citing the preservation of slavery and the "servitude of the African race" as primary reasons for secession.

== Full Text ==
"Whereas, the Federal Government has failed to accomplish the purposes of the compact of union between these States, in giving protection either to the persons of our people upon an exposed frontier, or to the property of our citizens; and, whereas, the action of the Northern States of the Union is violative of the compact between the States and the guarantees of the Constitution; and whereas the recent developments in Federal affairs, make it evident that the power of the Federal Government is sought to be made a weapon with which to strike down the interests and prosperity of the people of Texas and her Sister slaveholding States, instead of permitting it to be, as was intended, our shield against outrage and aggression:

Therefore,

=== Section 1 ===
We, the People of the State of Texas, by Delegates in Convention assembled, do declare and ordain, that the Ordinance adopted by our Covention of Delegates, on the Fourth day of July, A.D. 1845, and afterwards ratified by us, under which the Republic of Texas was admitted into Union with other States and became a party to the compact styled "The Constitution of the United States of America" be, and is hereby repealed and annulled; That all the powers, which by said compact were delegated by Texas to the Federal Government, are revoked and resumed; That Texas is of right absolved from all restraints and obligations incurred by said compact, and is a separate Sovereign State, and that her citizens and people are absolved from all allegiance to the United States, or the Government thereof.

=== Section 2 ===
This ordinance shall be submitted to the people of Texas for ratification or rejection by the qualified voters thereof, on the 23rd day of February 1861, and unless rejected by a majority of the votes cast, shall take effect and be in force on and after the 2nd day of March, A.D. 1861. Provided, that in the Representative District of El Paso, said election may be held on the 19th day of February, A.D. 1861.

Adopted in Convention, at Austin City, the first day of February, A.D. 1861."

== Results ==
"Ordinance of Secession"
| Choice | Votes | % |
|---|---|---|
| For | 46,153 | 75.78 |
| Against | 14,747 | 24.22 |
| Total | 60,900 | 100.00 |

=== County Breakdown ===
Though passing easily, the referendum revealed a sharp geographic and cultural divide across the state, with resistance to secession concentrated in specific regional pockets. Of the 122 counties reporting results, 18 voted against secession, while the remaining 104 supported joining the Confederacy. The final statewide tally was 46,153 (75.8%) in favor and 14,747 (24.2%) against, a margin of victory for secession of roughly three-to-one.

In roughly one-quarter of the counties, support for secession exceeded 95%. These areas, primarily in East and Coastal Texas like Harrison and Brazoria, were characterized by a deep economic reliance on cotton and slavery, as well as strong ties to the "Lower South" states of South Carolina and Mississippi.

Resistance was strongest in the Central Texas Hill Country, particularly in counties with high concentrations of German immigrants. Gillespie County voted overwhelmingly to remain in the Union (400 to 17), alongside Mason, Gillespie, Medina, and Uvalde. Travis County, home to the state capital of Austin, was one of the few urban centers to oppose secession, a move attributed by historians to an economy less dependent on the plantation system.

A string of eight counties along the Red River also rejected the ordinance. These included Collin, Cooke, Fannin, Grayson, Jack, Lamar, Montague, and Wise. Voters in this region often feared that secession would leave the northern frontier vulnerable to Indian attacks without the protection of the U.S. Army.

Breakdown of voting by county
| County | Yes | Votes | No | Votes |
|---|---|---|---|---|
| Fort Bend | 100.0% | 486 | 0.0% | 0 |
| Marion | 100.0% | 467 | 0.0% | 0 |
| Zapata | 100.0% | 212 | 0.0% | 0 |
| Palo Pinto | 100.0% | 107 | 0.0% | 0 |
| Webb | 100.0% | 70 | 0.0% | 0 |
| Brown | 100.0% | 16 | 0.0% | 0 |
| El Paso | 99.8% | 871 | 0.2% | 2 |
| Brazoria | 99.6% | 527 | 0.4% | 2 |
| Freestone | 99.5% | 585 | 0.5% | 3 |
| Karnes | 99.4% | 153 | 0.6% | 1 |
| Wharton | 99.2% | 249 | 0.8% | 2 |
| Panola | 99.1% | 556 | 0.9% | 5 |
| Grimes | 99.0% | 907 | 1.0% | 9 |
| Tyler | 99.0% | 417 | 1.0% | 4 |
| Starr | 98.9% | 180 | 1.1% | 2 |
| Hamilton | 98.9% | 86 | 1.1% | 1 |
| Anderson | 98.3% | 870 | 1.7% | 15 |
| Limestone | 98.3% | 525 | 1.7% | 9 |
| Newton | 98.3% | 178 | 1.7% | 3 |
| Orange | 97.9% | 142 | 2.1% | 3 |
| Liberty | 97.7% | 422 | 2.3% | 10 |
| Matagorda | 96.8% | 243 | 3.2% | 8 |
| Cherokee | 96.7% | 1106 | 3.3% | 38 |
| Washington | 96.3% | 1131 | 3.7% | 43 |
| Polk | 96.3% | 567 | 3.7% | 22 |
| Trinity | 96.3% | 206 | 3.7% | 8 |
| Galveston | 95.9% | 765 | 4.1% | 33 |
| Smith | 95.8% | 1149 | 4.2% | 50 |
| Comanche | 95.6% | 86 | 4.4% | 4 |
| Madison | 95.5% | 213 | 4.5% | 10 |
| Harrison | 95.2% | 866 | 4.8% | 44 |
| San Patricio | 94.9% | 56 | 5.1% | 3 |
| Bowie | 94.7% | 268 | 5.3% | 15 |
| Johnson | 94.5% | 531 | 5.5% | 31 |
| Calhoun | 94.5% | 276 | 5.5% | 16 |
| Jefferson | 94.5% | 256 | 5.5% | 15 |
| Upshur | 94.4% | 957 | 5.6% | 57 |
| Lavaca | 94.3% | 592 | 5.7% | 36 |
| Navarro | 94.2% | 621 | 5.8% | 38 |
| Cameron | 94.2% | 600 | 5.8% | 37 |
| Live Oak | 94.0% | 141 | 6.0% | 9 |
| Houston | 93.6% | 552 | 6.4% | 38 |
| Guadalupe | 93.5% | 314 | 6.5% | 22 |
| Cass | 93.0% | 423 | 7.0% | 32 |
| Jasper | 92.7% | 318 | 7.3% | 25 |
| Shelby | 92.2% | 333 | 7.8% | 28 |
| Goliad | 92.1% | 291 | 7.9% | 25 |
| San Augustine | 91.7% | 243 | 8.3% | 22 |
| Rusk | 91.1% | 1376 | 8.9% | 135 |
| Refugio | 91.0% | 142 | 9.0% | 14 |
| Gonzales | 90.9% | 802 | 9.1% | 80 |
| De Witt | 90.6% | 472 | 9.4% | 49 |
| Parker | 89.8% | 535 | 10.2% | 61 |
| Bee | 89.7% | 139 | 10.3% | 16 |
| Henderson | 89.2% | 397 | 10.8% | 48 |
| Walker | 88.9% | 490 | 11.1% | 61 |
| Sabine | 88.8% | 143 | 11.2% | 18 |
| Harris | 87.4% | 1128 | 12.6% | 163 |
| Erath | 87.3% | 185 | 12.7% | 27 |
| Leon | 86.7% | 534 | 13.3% | 82 |
| Hidalgo | 86.1% | 62 | 13.9% | 10 |
| Hill | 85.6% | 376 | 14.4% | 63 |
| Young | 84.3% | 166 | 15.7% | 31 |
| Coryell | 84.2% | 293 | 15.8% | 55 |
| Robertson | 83.7% | 391 | 16.3% | 76 |
| Burleson | 83.4% | 422 | 16.6% | 84 |
| Brazos | 83.0% | 215 | 17.0% | 44 |
| Wilson | 81.4% | 92 | 18.6% | 21 |
| Chambers | 80.7% | 109 | 19.3% | 26 |
| Austin | 79.6% | 825 | 20.4% | 212 |
| Tarrant | 79.1% | 499 | 20.9% | 132 |
| Victoria | 78.1% | 313 | 21.9% | 88 |
| Milam | 77.6% | 468 | 22.4% | 135 |
| Nueces | 77.2% | 142 | 22.8% | 42 |
| Nacogdoches | 77.1% | 317 | 22.9% | 94 |
| Montgomery | 76.4% | 318 | 23.6% | 98 |
| Dallas | 75.8% | 741 | 24.2% | 237 |
| McLennan | 75.4% | 586 | 24.6% | 191 |
| Ellis | 75.4% | 527 | 24.6% | 172 |
| Kaufman | 74.8% | 461 | 25.2% | 155 |
| Bosque | 73.8% | 223 | 26.2% | 79 |
| Comal | 73.5% | 239 | 26.5% | 86 |
| Hardin | 72.9% | 167 | 27.1% | 62 |
| Falls | 72.4% | 215 | 27.6% | 82 |
| Wood | 70.2% | 451 | 29.8% | 191 |
| Caldwell | 69.8% | 434 | 30.2% | 188 |
| Bell | 69.7% | 456 | 30.3% | 198 |
| Hopkins | 68.9% | 697 | 31.1% | 315 |
| Llano | 67.6% | 150 | 32.4% | 72 |
| Jackson | 65.6% | 147 | 34.4% | 77 |
| San Saba | 65.3% | 113 | 34.7% | 60 |
| Colorado | 63.9% | 584 | 36.1% | 330 |
| Atascosa | 61.4% | 145 | 38.6% | 91 |
| Titus | 59.9% | 411 | 40.1% | 275 |
| Hays | 59.1% | 166 | 40.9% | 115 |
| Van Zandt | 58.8% | 181 | 41.2% | 127 |
| Denton | 56.4% | 331 | 43.6% | 256 |
| Hunt | 55.1% | 416 | 44.9% | 339 |
| Red River | 55.0% | 347 | 45.0% | 284 |
| Bexar | 53.8% | 827 | 46.2% | 709 |
| Lampasas | 53.1% | 85 | 46.9% | 75 |
| Bandera | 50.8% | 33 | 49.2% | 32 |
| Wise | 50.6% | 78 | 49.4% | 76 |
| Bastrop | 48.8% | 335 | 51.2% | 352 |
| Fayette | 48.1% | 580 | 51.9% | 626 |
| Lamar | 45.5% | 553 | 54.5% | 663 |
| Angelina | 43.0% | 139 | 57.0% | 184 |
| Williamson | 42.1% | 349 | 57.9% | 480 |
| Fannin | 41.8% | 471 | 58.2% | 656 |
| Medina | 40.3% | 140 | 59.7% | 207 |
| Travis | 39.0% | 450 | 61.0% | 704 |
| Burnet | 38.8% | 157 | 61.2% | 248 |
| Blanco | 38.8% | 108 | 61.2% | 170 |
| Cooke | 38.3% | 137 | 61.7% | 221 |
| Montague | 36.8% | 50 | 63.2% | 86 |
| Grayson | 33.9% | 463 | 66.1% | 901 |
| Collin | 29.9% | 405 | 70.1% | 948 |
| Uvalde | 17.4% | 16 | 82.6% | 76 |
| Jack | 15.6% | 14 | 84.4% | 76 |
| Gillespie | 3.9% | 16 | 96.1% | 398 |
| Mason | 2.6% | 2 | 97.4% | 75 |

== Aftermath ==
Following the referendum on February 23, 1861, the Secession Convention reconvened in Austin on March 2. This date was chosen to coincide with the 25th anniversary of the Texas Declaration of Independence. The convention officially certified the election results and declared Texas an independent state.

On March 5, 1861, the convention passed an ordinance to unite Texas with the Confederate States of America. Delegates were appointed to the Confederate Congress, and the state's military resources were formally pledged to the new government. This followed earlier actions by the convention’s Committee of Public Safety, which had negotiated the surrender of all federal posts in Texas, including the federal arsenal in San Antonio, prior to the finalization of the popular vote.

=== Removal of Sam Houston ===
The convention mandated that all state officials take an oath of allegiance to the Confederacy. On March 14, Governor Sam Houston was summoned to the capitol to take the oath but failed to appear. After three separate calls, the convention declared the Office of the Governor vacant on March 16. Lieutenant Governor Edward Clark was subsequently sworn in as governor. Houston retired to his private residence in Huntsville, where he remained until his death in 1863.
