= Lieutenant Governor of Texas =

Second-highest elected office in Texas

Lieutenant Governor and President of the Senate of Texas
- Seal of the lieutenant governor

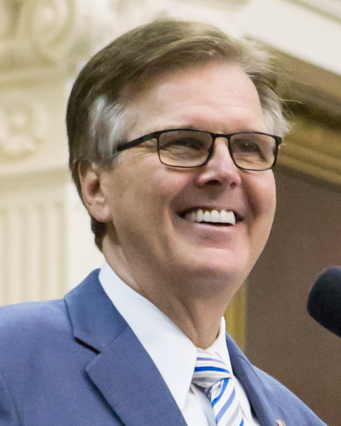
- Incumbent; Dan Patrick since January 20, 2015
- Style: The Honorable
- Term length: Four years, no term limits
- Inaugural holder: Albert Clinton Horton; 1846
- Formation: Texas Constitution
- Website: Office of the Lieutenant Governor

The lieutenant governor of Texas is the second-highest constitutional officer in the U.S. state of Texas. It is the second-highest rank in the state government, behind only the governor.

The lieutenant governor serves as the first person in the gubernatorial line of succession, as an ex officio member of several state boards, and as the president of the Texas Senate. Unlike most lieutenant governors in the U.S., whose position in their respective state senates are largely ceremonial, the lieutenant governor of Texas plays an active role in running the chamber.

The lieutenant governor is elected every four years during the state's midterm elections. It is elected separately from the governor and has no term limits. The current lieutenant governor is Dan Patrick, who has served since January 20, 2015. The lieutenant governor-elect is Vikki Goodwin, who will take office January 19, 2027.

== Powers and duties ==
Under the provisions of the Texas Constitution, the lieutenant governor is president of the Texas Senate. Unlike with most other states' senates and the U.S. Senate, the lieutenant governor regularly presides over the chamber rather than delegating this function to the president pro tempore or a majority leader. By the rules of the Senate, the lieutenant governor establishes all special and standing committees, appoints all chairpersons and members, assigns all Senate legislation to the committee of their choice, and can cast a deciding vote in the event of a tie. The lieutenant governor decides all questions of parliamentary procedure in the Senate and has broad discretion in following Senate procedural rules. The lieutenant governor also has substantial influence on the progress and outcome of state bills through their powers in the Senate.

The lieutenant governor is an ex officio member of several statutory bodies, including the Legislative Budget Board, the Legislative Council, and the Legislative Audit Committee, which have considerable sway over state programs, the budget and policy. The lieutenant governor is also a member of the Legislative Redistricting Board (together with the speaker of the House, attorney general, comptroller, and land commissioner), which is charged with adopting a redistricting plan for the Texas House of Representatives, Texas Senate, or U.S. House of Representatives after the decennial census if the Legislature fails to do so.

The lieutenant governor assumes the powers of the governor of Texas when the governor is out of the state or otherwise unable to discharge the office.

In the case of a vacancy in the lieutenant governor's office, the Senate elects one of its members to act as President of the Senate until the next statewide office election, in effect becoming the lieutenant governor. A senator elected as presiding officer in this way retains their district seat and the voting privileges entailed with their Senate election.

=== Comparison with other lieutenant governors ===
Texas is one of the few states that vests significant power in the office of lieutenant governor, making it among the most influential. By contrast, the lieutenant governor position in other states has few (if any) legislative responsibilities, akin to the vice president of the United States.

== History ==
The position of the lieutenant governor was established in the Constitution of 1845 as a successor to the Vice President of the Republic of Texas. The term of office was established as a two-year term in 1845, then changed to a four-year term through the constitution of 1866, and returned to its two-year term in 1869. The position went through a large number of changes due to the influence of the Texas Constitution of 1876, which gradually strengthened their powers and allowed for the lieutenant governor to expand influence in legislation. These changes were solidified with the support of the Progressive Era. In 1972, voters approved a constitutional amendment that changed the term of office for both the governor and lieutenant governor to four years, starting with the 1974 election.

=== Succession ===
The lieutenant governor becomes the governor if the elected governor resigns, dies, or is removed from office via impeachment and conviction. This has occurred seven times:

- In 1853, James W. Henderson briefly succeeded governor Peter Hansborough Bell when the latter resigned to serve in the U.S. House of Representatives. Henderson served the last 28 days of Bell's term.
- In 1861, Edward Clark succeeded governor Sam Houston when the latter refused to swear an oath to the Confederacy and was removed from office.
- In 1876, Richard B. Hubbard succeeded governor Richard Coke when the latter resigned to serve in the U.S. Senate.
- In 1917, William P. Hobby succeeded governor James E. Ferguson when the latter was impeached and removed from office.
- In 1941, Coke R. Stevenson succeeded governor W. Lee O'Daniel when the latter resigned to serve in the U.S. Senate.
- In 1949, Allan Shivers succeeded governor Beauford H. Jester when the latter died in office.
- In 2000, Rick Perry succeeded governor George W. Bush when the latter resigned to serve as U.S. President.

Additionally, in 1865, Fletcher Stockdale briefly served as acting governor after governor Pendleton Murrah fled to Mexico at the end of the Civil War. He did not officially assume the governorship and was quickly succeeded by a U.S.-appointed provisional governor, Andrew Jackson Hamilton.

Gubernatorial succession in the state has never extended beyond the lieutenant governor.

=== Party affiliation ===
Historically, the position has been dominated by the Texas Democratic Party. The first Republican to be elected to the office was J. W. Flanagan in 1868, but he resigned the office before his inauguration to serve in the U.S. Senate. After his resignation, several Republicans served in the office ex officio until 1874, when Democrat Richard B. Hubbard was elected. The next Republican to hold the office was Rick Perry, elected in 1998 and inaugurated in 1999. Since Perry's election, the office has been controlled by Republicans.

Because the lieutenant governor is elected separately from the governor, it is possible for the governor and lieutenant governor to be from different political parties. This has happened three times, all with a Democratic lieutenant governor alongside a Republican governor: twice during the lieutenant governorship of William P. Hobby, Jr. (1979–1983 and 1987–1991, both alongside governor Bill Clements) and during the lieutenant governorship of Bob Bullock (1995–1999 alongside governor George W. Bush).

== List of lieutenant governors of Texas ==
Legend: Democratic (38) Republican (4)

List of lieutenant governors of Texas
No.	Image	Lieutenant Governor	Party	Term in office	Governor
1		Albert Clinton Horton (Note: Horton served as Governor pro tempore during James Pinckney Henderson's absence from May 19 to November 13, 1846.)	Democratic	May 2, 1846 – December 21, 1847	James Pinckney Henderson
2		John Alexander Greer	Democratic	December 21, 1847 – December 22, 1851	George Tyler Wood; Peter Hansborough Bell
3		James W. Henderson (Note: Henderson vacated the office on November 23, 1853 to succeed Peter Hansborough Bell as Governor. Senate president pro tempore Taylor filled the vacancy for roughly a month before Dickson was sworn into office.)	Democratic	December 22, 1851 – November 23, 1853	Peter Hansborough Bell
4		David Catchings Dickson	Democratic	December 21, 1853 – December 21, 1855	Elisha M. Pease
5		Hardin Richard Runnels	Democratic	December 21, 1855 – December 21, 1857	Elisha M. Pease
6		Francis Lubbock	Democratic	December 21, 1857 – December 21, 1859	Hardin Richard Runnels
7		Edward Clark	Democratic	December 21, 1859 – March 16, 1861	Sam Houston
8		John McClannahan Crockett	Democratic	November 7, 1861 – November 5, 1863	Francis Lubbock
9		Fletcher Stockdale	Democratic	November 5, 1863 – June 17, 1865	Pendleton Murrah
—	Vacant			June 17, 1865 – August 9, 1866	Fletcher Stockdale; Andrew Jackson Hamilton
10		George Washington Jones (Note: Jones was removed by General Philip Sheridan, commander of the Fifth Military District during Reconstruction and the office remained vacant until the 14th Legislature in 1874.)	Democratic	August 9, 1866 – July 30, 1867	James W. Throckmorton
—	Vacant			July 30, 1867 – January 8, 1870	Elisha M. Pease
—		James W. Flanagan (Note: Flanagan was elected lieutenant governor in 1869 but was not inaugurated. He briefly presided over a Provisional session, but left office after being elected by the legislature to serve in the United States Senate. Due to this, Flanagan is often omitted from some lists of Lieutenant Governors.)	Republican	January 8, 1870 – February 24, 1870	Edmund J. Davis
—	Vacant (Note: Donald Campbell, Webster Flanagan, Albert Jennings Fountain, and Edward Bradford Pickett all served as ex officio Lieutenant Governors between Flanagan's and Hubbard's terms.)			February 24, 1870 – January 15, 1874	Edmund J. Davis
11		Richard B. Hubbard	Democratic	January 15, 1874 – December 1, 1876	Richard Coke
—	Vacant (Note: Senate president pro tempore Wells Thompson filled in for the vacancy.)			December 1, 1876 – January 21, 1879	Richard B. Hubbard
12		Joseph Draper Sayers	Democratic	January 21, 1879 – January 18, 1881	Oran Milo Roberts
13		Leonidas Jefferson Storey	Democratic	January 18, 1881 – January 16, 1883	Oran Milo Roberts
14		Francis Marion Martin	Democratic	January 16, 1883 – January 20, 1885	John Ireland
15		Barnett Gibbs	Democratic	January 20, 1885 – January 19, 1887	John Ireland
16		Thomas Benton Wheeler	Democratic	January 19, 1887 – January 21, 1891	Lawrence Sullivan Ross
17		George C. Pendleton	Democratic	January 21, 1891 – January 17, 1893	Jim Hogg
18		Martin McNulty Crane	Democratic	January 17, 1893 – January 15, 1895	Jim Hogg
19		George Taylor Jester	Democratic	January 15, 1895 – January 17, 1899	Charles Allen Culberson
20		James Browning	Democratic	January 17, 1899 – January 20, 1903	Joseph D. Sayers
21		George D. Neal	Democratic	January 20, 1903 – January 15, 1907	S. W. T. Lanham
22		Asbury Bascom Davidson	Democratic	January 15, 1907 – January 21, 1913	Thomas Mitchell Campbell; Oscar Branch Colquitt
23		William Harding Mayes	Democratic	January 21, 1913 – August 14, 1914	Oscar Branch Colquitt
—	Vacant			August 14, 1914 – January 19, 1915	Oscar Branch Colquitt
24		William P. Hobby Sr.	Democratic	January 19, 1915 – August 25, 1917	James E. Ferguson
—	Vacant			August 25, 1917 – January 21, 1919	William P. Hobby
25		Willard Arnold Johnson	Democratic	January 21, 1919 – January 18, 1921	William P. Hobby
26		Lynch Davidson	Democratic	January 18, 1921 – January 16, 1923	Pat Morris Neff
27		Thomas Whitfield Davidson	Democratic	January 16, 1923 – January 20, 1925	Pat Morris Neff
28		Barry Miller	Democratic	January 20, 1925 – January 20, 1931	Miriam A. Ferguson; Dan Moody
29		Edgar E. Witt	Democratic	January 20, 1931 – January 15, 1935	Ross S. Sterling; Miriam A. Ferguson
30		Walter Frank Woodul	Democratic	January 15, 1935 – January 17, 1939	James V. Allred
31		Coke R. Stevenson	Democratic	January 17, 1939 – August 4, 1941	W. Lee O'Daniel
—	Vacant			August 4, 1941 – January 19, 1943	Coke R. Stevenson
32		John Lee Smith	Democratic	January 19, 1943 – January 21, 1947	Coke R. Stevenson; Beauford H. Jester
33		Allan Shivers	Democratic	January 21, 1947 – July 11, 1949	Beauford H. Jester
—	Vacant			July 11, 1949 – January 16, 1951	Allan Shivers
34		Ben Ramsey	Democratic	January 16, 1951 – September 18, 1961	Allan Shivers; Price Daniel
—	Vacant			September 18, 1961 – January 15, 1963	Price Daniel
35		Preston Smith	Democratic	January 15, 1963 – January 21, 1969	John Connally
36		Ben Barnes	Democratic	January 21, 1969 – January 16, 1973	Preston Smith
37		William P. Hobby Jr.	Democratic	January 16, 1973 – January 15, 1991	Dolph Briscoe (Democratic); Bill Clements (Republican); Mark White (Democratic); Bill Clements (Republican)
38		Bob Bullock	Democratic	January 15, 1991 – January 19, 1999	Ann Richards (Democratic); George W. Bush (Republican)
39		Rick Perry (Note: Perry vacated the office when he succeeded George W. Bush as Governor of Texas on December 21, 2000.)	Republican	January 19, 1999 – December 21, 2000	George W. Bush
40		Bill Ratliff (Note: Ratliff was chosen by the Texas Senate to finish the unexpired term due to the vacancy of Rick Perry's succession to the Governorship. Ratliff served until David Dewhurst was elected in 2002 and inaugurated on January 21, 2003.)	Republican	December 28, 2000 – January 21, 2003	Rick Perry
41		David Dewhurst	Republican	January 21, 2003 – January 20, 2015	Rick Perry
42		Dan Patrick	Republican	January 20, 2015 – Incumbent (Note: Patrick's third term began on January 17, 2023, and will expire January 19, 2027.)	Greg Abbott
43		Vikki Goodwin	Democratic	Lieutenant Governor-elect takes office January 19, 2027	Gina Hinojosa
