= J. Goldsteen Dupree =

American politician from Texas

Texas House of Representatives
- In office February 8, 1870 – January 14, 1873

Personal details
- Born: c. 1846
- Died: 1873 (aged 26–27)
- Party: Republican

J. Goldsteen Dupree (c. 1846 – 1873) was an assassinated Republican African-American member of the Texas House of Representatives. He testified against two fellow black legislators who were then unseated for having received ineligible votes. Dupree was murdered, allegedly by white vigilantes.

== See also ==
- African American officeholders from the end of the Civil War until before 1900
