= David Medlock Jr. =

Texas politician

David Medlock Jr. (c. 1824 – ?) served in the Texas legislature during the Reconstruction era. He was born in Georgia to a family held as slaves that was relocated to Texas. After emancipation he settled in Limestone County, Texas with family members.

He served in the Texas House of Representatives during the Twelfth Texas Legislature from February 8, 1870 to December 2, 1871. He was a representative until January 14, 1873. He was on the Federal Relations Committee, sponsored a bill incorporating Springfield, Texas, and sought funding for construction of a jail in Limestone County.

He married in 1848 and had 9 children. After his wife died he married her sister and had 3 more children.

The Bullock Museum has his oath of office marked with an X for his signature.

== See also ==
- African American officeholders from the end of the Civil War until before 1900
