= William A. Saylor =

American politician (1843–1887)

William Ashford Saylor

25th & 27th Mayor of Austin
- In office 1879–1881
- Preceded by: Jacob C. DeGress
- Succeeded by: L. M. Crooker
- In office 1883–1884
- Preceded by: L. M. Crooker
- Succeeded by: John W. Robertson

Member of the Texas Senate
- In office 1870–1874

Personal details
- Born: December 5, 1843 Saylor Township, Polk County, Iowa, U.S.
- Died: September 20, 1887 (aged 43) Austin, Texas, U.S.
- Resting place: Oakwood Cemetery, Austin, Texas, U.S.
- Party: Republican
- Spouse: Mary V. Swisher
- Children: 3
- Occupation: Politician, lawyer, businessman, military officer, civil servant

William Ashford "W. A." Saylor (December 5, 1843 – September 20, 1887) was an American politician, lawyer, businessman, and military officer who served as the 25th and 27th mayor of Austin from 1879 to 1881 and from 1883 to 1884. A member of the Republican Party, he also served in the Texas Senate and as a soldier in the Union army during the American Civil War.

== Life and career ==
William Ashford Saylor was born on December 5, 1843, in Saylor Township, Polk County, Iowa.

During the American Civil War he served in Company A of the 23rd Iowa Infantry Regiment, in the Union army. He enrolled in August 1862 as a sergeant, and ended service a year later as a captain.

Saylor and Mary V. Swisher were married. She was the daughter of John Milton Swisher, an early Texas businessman.

Saylor was a lawyer in Bryan, Texas. A Republican, he was elected in the 1869 Texas Senate election, and his term was from 1870 to 1874, representing Brazos, Burleson, and Milam counties. Saylor was elected the Mayor of Austin, serving from 1879 to 1881, and again in 1883 to 1884.

Saylor was a collector of Internal Revenue Service for Texas's second district. He was involved in the mining business in Mexico.

Saylor died September 20, 1887 in Austin and was buried at Oakwood Cemetery.

== See also ==
- Reconstruction era
- Carpetbagger
