= Giles Cotton =

American politician

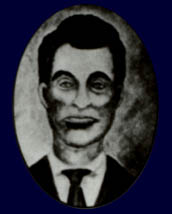
- A photograph of Giles Cotton from c. 1870

Member of the Texas House of Representatives from the 18th district
- In office February 10, 1870 – January 14, 1873

Personal details
- Born: c. 1814
- Died: c. 1883
- Party: Republican

Giles Cotton, also known as Silas Cotton, (died 1883 or 1884) was an emancipated slave, farmer, and state legislator in Texas. A Radical Republican, he served in the Texas House of Representatives during the Reconstruction era from 1870 to 1873. He married and had seven children.

== Life ==
Cotton, the son of an enslaved woman and a white plantation overseer, was born into slavery in South Carolina and was illiterate throughout his life. According to the Handbook of Texas, Cotton's owner was most likely Ethan Stroud at the time of his birth. Logan Shroud became Cotton's owner after Ethan Shroud died in 1847. While enslaved by Logan Shroud, Cotton was permitted to own mules and a wagon, serving as a teamster for Shroud.

He was emancipated from slavery following the American Civil War and moved to Calvert, Texas. In 1869, he was elected to serve in the Twelfth Texas Legislature in the Texas House of Representatives, where he served from 1870 until 1873.

== Political positions ==
Cotton was a Radical Republican. In 1871, Cotton voted to prohibit the public carrying of weapons, including pistols, knives, slingshots, and sword-canes. At the time, he was one of twelve black legislators in the Texas House of Representatives.

== Family ==
According to The Handbook of Texas, Cotton married a woman named "Miley" before 1840. On September 5, 1870, Cotton married Rachel. That same year, the U.S. census reported that the newlywed couple had seven children living in their household. Owing to his many children, he was "recognized as the father of all the Cottons in Limestone and Robertson counties."

== See also ==
- African American officeholders from the end of the Civil War until before 1900
