= Bolivar Jackson Pridgen =

American state legislator (1829-1903)

Bolivar Jackson Pridgen (February 14, 1829 - February 15, 1903) was a state legislator. He served from 1870 to 1873 in the Texas Senate. He lived in Price's Creek, Texas. Price's Creek later became part of Thomaston, Texas. He had disagreements with the "Radical Republican" faction. He served in the 12th Texas Legislature.

He was born in North Carolina. He served in the Mexican-American War. He was postmaster of Eagle Pass, Texas.
