= Mijamin Priest =

American religious leader and politicia (1808–1884)

Mijamin Priest (December 23, 1808 – 1884) was a religious leader and state legislator in Alabama and then Texas. He also became a lawyer and was a delegate at the Texas Constitutional Convention held in 1868 and 1869.

He was born near Huntsville, Alabama. Orphaned, he moved to Moulton, Alabama. He became a Presbyterian clergyman. He served in the Alabama House of Representatives from 1836 until 1839. He ran for the State Senate as member of the Whig Party but lost and took up the study of law.

Priest moved to Texas where he had family and friends. He was elected to the Texas Senate in a contested 1869 election. He represented Cherokee County, Texas and was part of the contentious Twelfth Texas Legislature. Priest was involved in contentious efforts to institute martial law. Thirteen senators walked out, a move that denied a quorum and the sergeant at arms brought several legislators back and several were arrested. Priest became a judge. He removed a Democratic judge seen as biased against Republicans and African Americans whose brother went on to become governor. Proceedings were held to remove Priest and others from office in 1874. He was removed as Democrats regained power in the waning years of the Reconstruction era. The University of Texas has a journal he kept. A pictorial history of his life and his descendants was published as well as a book titled Mijamin Priest and his Family: from William Penn's Colony to East Texas.
