= Marmion Henry Bowers =

American lawyer, state legislator (1829–1872)

Marmion Henry Bowers (April 29, 1829 – March 3, 1872) was an American lawyer and state legislator in Texas.

He was born in Moores Hill, Indiana. After obtaining his law degree from Indiana University he established a law practice before moving to Texas in 1853. He worked in Burnet, Texas for a few years and campaigned for local offices before moving to Austin.

He served in the Confederate Army during the American Civil War and in the Texas House of Representatives. After the war during the Reconstruction Era he served in the Texas Senate. He opposed a martial law bill proposed by the governor.

He married and had five children.

Stephen F. Austin State University has his letterbooks.

== See also ==
- 12th Texas Legislature
