= Enoch Leach Alford =

State senator in Texas

Enoch Leach Alford (June 5, 1829 – June 10, 1912) was a member of the Texas Senate elected in the 1869 Texas Senate election. He was a Republican.

== Biography ==
Born in Pennsylvania, he moved to Texas where he represented Bastrop County and Fayette County. He opposed a bill establishing a state militia. Several senators were arrested after walking out in protest of the bill, and Alford was expelled from the Texas Senate, in part due to allegations that he had punched another member of the senate. Days later, he participated in a public meeting in Austin of the arrested men and their supporters. Though later reinstated, the legality of the reinstatement was disputed. He also served as a county commissioner.

Reinhard Hildebrandt succeeded him in the Texas Senate.

== Personal life and death ==
Alford died at the age of 83 in San Antonio, Texas, where he had resided for the last several years of his life. At the time of his death he had no living relatives, and he was buried in the Odd Fellows Cemetery under the auspices of the Masonic order of which he vas a member.

== See also ==
- Reconstruction era
