= J. W. Flanagan =

American politician (1805–1887)

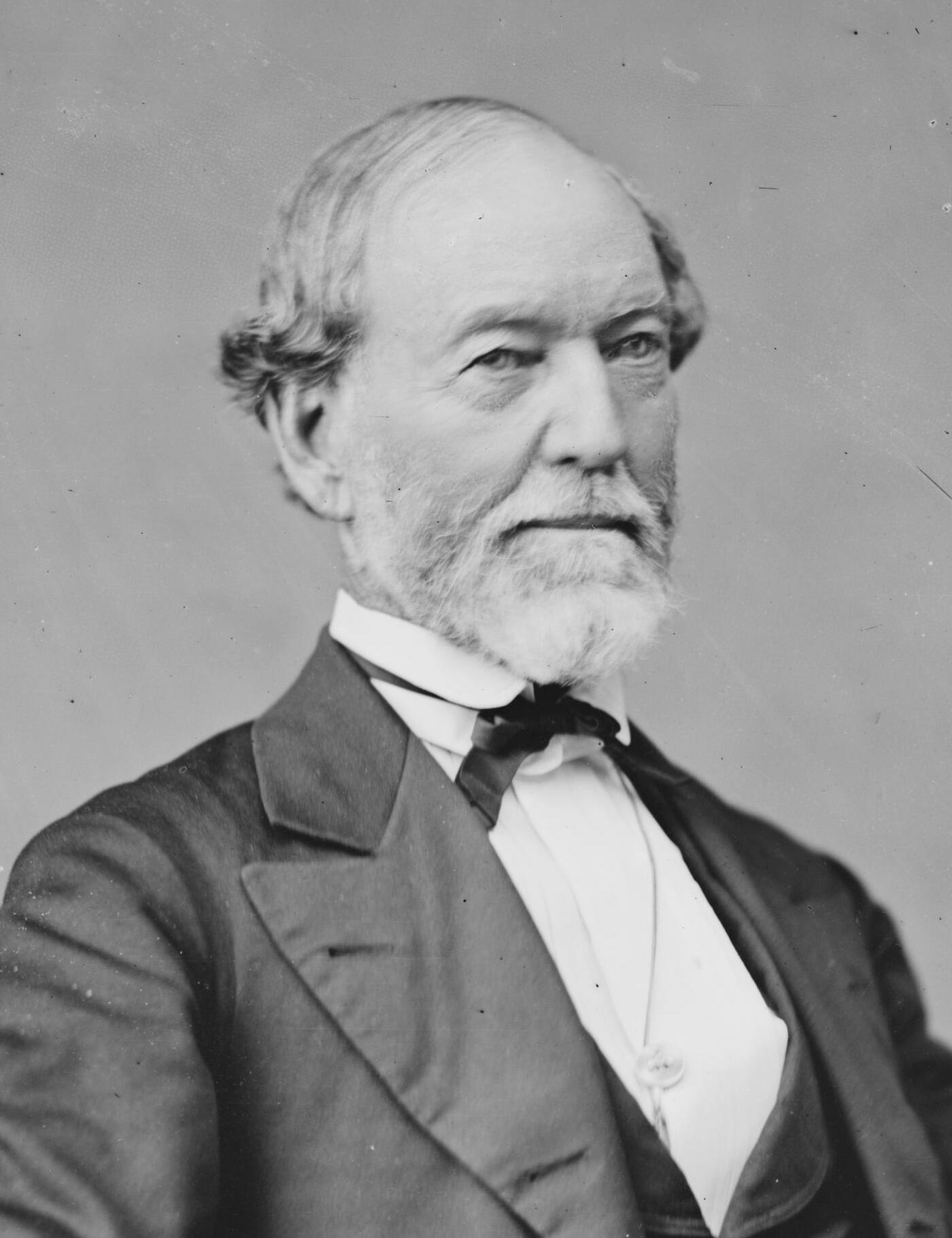

United States Senator from Texas
- In office March 30, 1870 – March 3, 1875
- Preceded by: Louis Wigfall
- Succeeded by: Samuel B. Maxey

Lieutenant Governor of Texas
- Acting; January 8, 1870 – February 24, 1870
- Governor: Edmund J. Davis
- Preceded by: George W. Jones
- Succeeded by: Donald Campbell (Ex officio); Richard B. Hubbard

Member of the Texas Senate from the 9th district
- In office November 5, 1855 – November 2, 1857
- Preceded by: David Gage
- Succeeded by: Malcolm D. Graham

Member of the Texas House of Representatives from the 10th district
- In office November 3, 1851 – November 7, 1853
- Preceded by: M. D. K. Taylor
- Succeeded by: Andrew G. Melton

Personal details
- Born: James Winright Flanagan; September 5, 1805 Gordonsville, Virginia, U.S.
- Died: September 28, 1887 (aged 82) Longview, Texas, U.S.
- Party: Republican
- Children: Webster Flanagan

James Winright Flanagan (September 5, 1805 – September 28, 1887) was an American merchant, lawyer, and farmer from Henderson, Texas. Although never officially inaugurated, he briefly served as the lieutenant governor of Texas in 1870, before leaving the position to represent Texas in the United States Senate from 1870 to 1875.

== Early life ==
Flanagan was born to Charles and Elizabeth (Saunders) Flanagan in Albemarle County near Gordonsville, Virginia. Before his tenth birthday, the family moved to Boonesboro, Kentucky. As a young man he moved to Cloverport, Kentucky, on the Ohio River and became a prosperous merchant.

=== Marriage and legal career ===
He also read law and was admitted to the Kentucky bar in 1825. He married Polly Moorman in 1826 and the couple had several children before moving to Henderson, Texas, in 1844.

== Career ==
Flanagan established himself in Henderson by opening a store. He bought a farm, speculated in land, and practiced law. Politically, he was a Whig and an active supporter of Sam Houston. He later became a moderate Republican. Flanagan served in the Texas House of Representatives (1851–1852) and the Texas State Senate (1855–1858).

=== Congress ===
When the Civil War came to Texas, Flanagan was a Unionist. He withdrew to his farm and lived quietly. He would return to active politics during the Reconstruction. Flanagan served as a delegate to both Constitutional Conventions. The first, in 1866, produced a state constitution that was rejected by the Radical Republicans in the U.S. Congress. The second, in 1868–1869, was successful.

Under the new Constitution, Flanagan was elected as Lieutenant Governor in 1869. He would be the last Republican elected to the position until Rick Perry in 1998. He only held the position for a month, from January to February 1870. When Texas was readmitted to the Union, the legislature named him, along with Morgan Hamilton, to the U.S. Senate. He served one term as a Senator, until 1875 when he was replaced by the Democrat Samuel Maxey. In the Senate he was a supporter of the Grant Administration. While in Congress, Flanagan did not vote on the Ku Klux Klan Act, but voted for the Civil Rights Act of 1875.

== Later life ==
After his Senate term, Flanagan took up residence on one of his farms near Longview, Texas. He married again (he was widowed twice and married three times), this time to Elizabeth Lane. The three marriages produced a total of eleven children. One of Flanagan's children was David Webster Flanagan who also served as Lieutenant Governor in Texas.

Flanagan died on his farm in Longview in 1887 and was buried next to his first wife, Polly, in their family graveyard in Henderson, Texas.

Texas Senate
Preceded by David Gage	Texas State Senator from District 9; 1855–1857	Succeeded by Malcolm D. Graham
Political offices
Preceded by George Washington Jones	Lieutenant Governor of Texas; 1869–1870	Succeeded by Donald Campbell (Ex officio); Richard B. Hubbard
U.S. Senate
Preceded by vacant^{(1)}	U.S. senator (Class 1) from Texas; 1870–1875; Served alongside: Morgan C. Hamilton	Succeeded by Samuel B. Maxey
Notes and references
1. Because Texas seceded from the Union in 1861, seat was declared vacant from 1861 to 1870 when Louis T. Wigfall withdrew from the Senate.
