= Theodor Rudolph Hertzberg =

American businessman and politician (1817–1903)

Member of the Texas Senate from the 29th district
- In office 8 February 1870 – 12 December 1871
- Preceded by: John T. Littleton
- Succeeded by: Henry C. King

Personal details
- Born: June 6, 1817 Halberstadt, Prussia
- Died: March 18, 1903 (aged 85) San Antonio, Texas, U.S.
- Party: Radical Republicans
- Education: University of Jena

Theodor Rudolph Hertzberg (June 6, 1817 – March 18, 1903) was a businessman, editor, publisher and state legislator in Texas. He served in the state senate during the contentious Twelfth Texas Legislature. He became an immigration commissioner and then a diplomat later in his career.

== Life and career ==
Hertzberg was born in Halberstadt, Prussia. He studied at the University of Jena before emigrating. He arrived at Galveston, Texas on December 2, 1849. He moved to San Antonio, was a partner in a tobacconist shop, and became a naturalized citizen on April 11, 1856. He was a member of the Casino Club and helped organize a German-English School.

An anti-slavery Unionist, He lived in Mexico during the American Civil War. He took over a German language newspaper. He was elected a state senator in 1870 representing Menard County. He was then appointed to public office. He later became a U.S. diplomat in Europe. He eventually returned to San Antonio. His home there at 155 Crofton Avenue where he lived with his wife and family until he died March 18, 1903, was designated a Texas historical landmark in 1963. Sidney J. Brooks Jr., a pilot who died training for World War I, for whom Brooks Air Force Base is named, also lived in the house.
