= Matthew Gaines =

American politician (1840–1900)

Member of the Texas Senate from the 16th district
- In office February 8, 1870 – January 13, 1874
- Preceded by: Abraham Morris Gentry
- Succeeded by: Seth Shepard

Personal details
- Born: August 4, 1840 Alexandria, Louisiana, U.S.
- Died: June 11, 1900 (aged 59) Giddings, Texas, U.S.
- Party: Republican

Matthew Gaines (August 4, 1840 – June 11, 1900) was a former slave, community leader, minister, and Republican Texas state senator during the Reconstruction era. As one of the first two African American state senators ever elected in Texas alongside George Ruby, he advocated for free public education, civil rights, and economic opportunity for newly emancipated black Texans.

== Early life ==
Matthew Gaines was born on August 4, 1840, near Alexandria, Louisiana on a plantation belonging to the family of Bernardo Martin Despallier. His mother was enslaved by Candida Grande Despallier, whose son Charles Despallier had died at the Battle of the Alamo. Gaines taught himself to read from books provided to him illicitly by a white boy who may have been young Blaz Philipe Despallier, who also lived on the estate.

After being sold from the Despallier family, Gaines escaped from his new owner in Louisiana in 1850, making it all the way to Camden, Arkansas. After several months there, Gaines returned to New Orleans, where he was captured and returned to his legal owner. In 1859, Gaines was sold to Christopher Columbus Hearne of Robertson County, Texas, where Gaines remained until 1863 when he tried to flee to Mexico. He was caught again and was forced to work as a blacksmith and shepherd in Fredericksburg, Texas until the end of the American Civil War.

== Career ==
After the Emancipation Proclamation was officially announced in Texas on June 19, 1865, Gaines settled in Burton, Washington County, where he established himself as a leader of the freedmen, both as a Baptist preacher and a politician. In 1866, alongside George Ruby, he founded the Texas House of Councils.

In 1869, Gaines was elected as a Senator of Texas's 16th district in the Twelfth Texas Legislature. He gained a reputation for being a guardian of the newly won rights of the Black Texans. Throughout his term, he addressed the issues of public education, prison reform, the protection of black voters, and tenant farming reformation. Gaines actively supported the forward movement that established the first public school system for all Texans and assisted in allowing Texas to take advantage of the federal Grant College Act, also known as the Morrill Act.

In 1870, Gaines played a strategic role in passing the Militia Bill, which created a state police force to combat lawlessness and to protect against voter intimidation. Gaines was elected to a six-year term to the Senate, but only served four years. In a politically motivated trial he was convicted of bigamy in 1873. Despite the charge being overturned on appeal, his seat was challenged by Seth Shepard and he was removed from office on the grounds of being a convicted felon. In 1875, he was arrested for making a civil rights speech in Giddings. He told his audience that "in the eyes of God, Blacks are as good as whites; they should have pride and hold their heads up even in troubled times." Gaines continued to be active in politics and made his political views known in conventions, public gatherings, and from his pulpit.

== Death and legacy ==
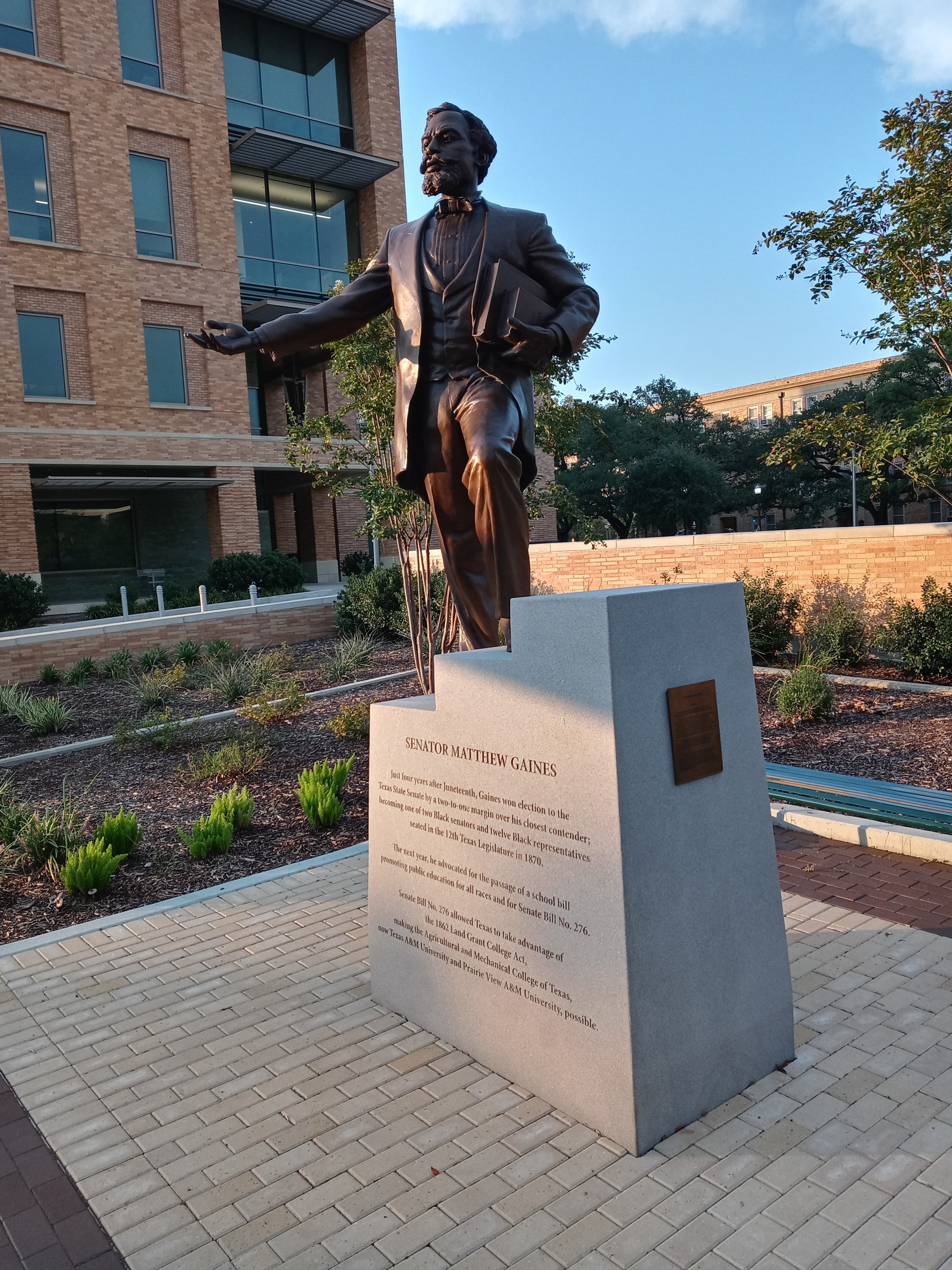
The Gaines statue at Texas A&M University.

Gaines died in Giddings, Texas, on June 11, 1900.

In 1998, activists on the campus of Texas A&M University suggested Gaines should have his statue displayed prominently. The project was abandoned in the wake of the Aggie Bonfire tragedy in 1999. However, 19 years later, Texas A&M students and other supporters pushed yet again for the establishment of a statue of Matthew Gaines on the Texas A&M College Station campus. On June 19 of 2020, the donation goal of the "Matthew Gaines Initiative" was surpassed. A statue of Gaines was unveiled and dedicated on November 19, 2021.

In 2016, Lori Bartley, who claimed to be his great-granddaughter, ran unsuccessfully for US Congress against Sheila Jackson Lee.

== See also ==
- African American officeholders from the end of the Civil War until before 1900

Texas Senate
Preceded by Abraham Morris Gentry	Texas State Senator from District 16; 1870–1873	Succeeded by Seth Shepard
