= Morgan C. Hamilton =

American politician (1809–1893)

Morgan Calvin Hamilton
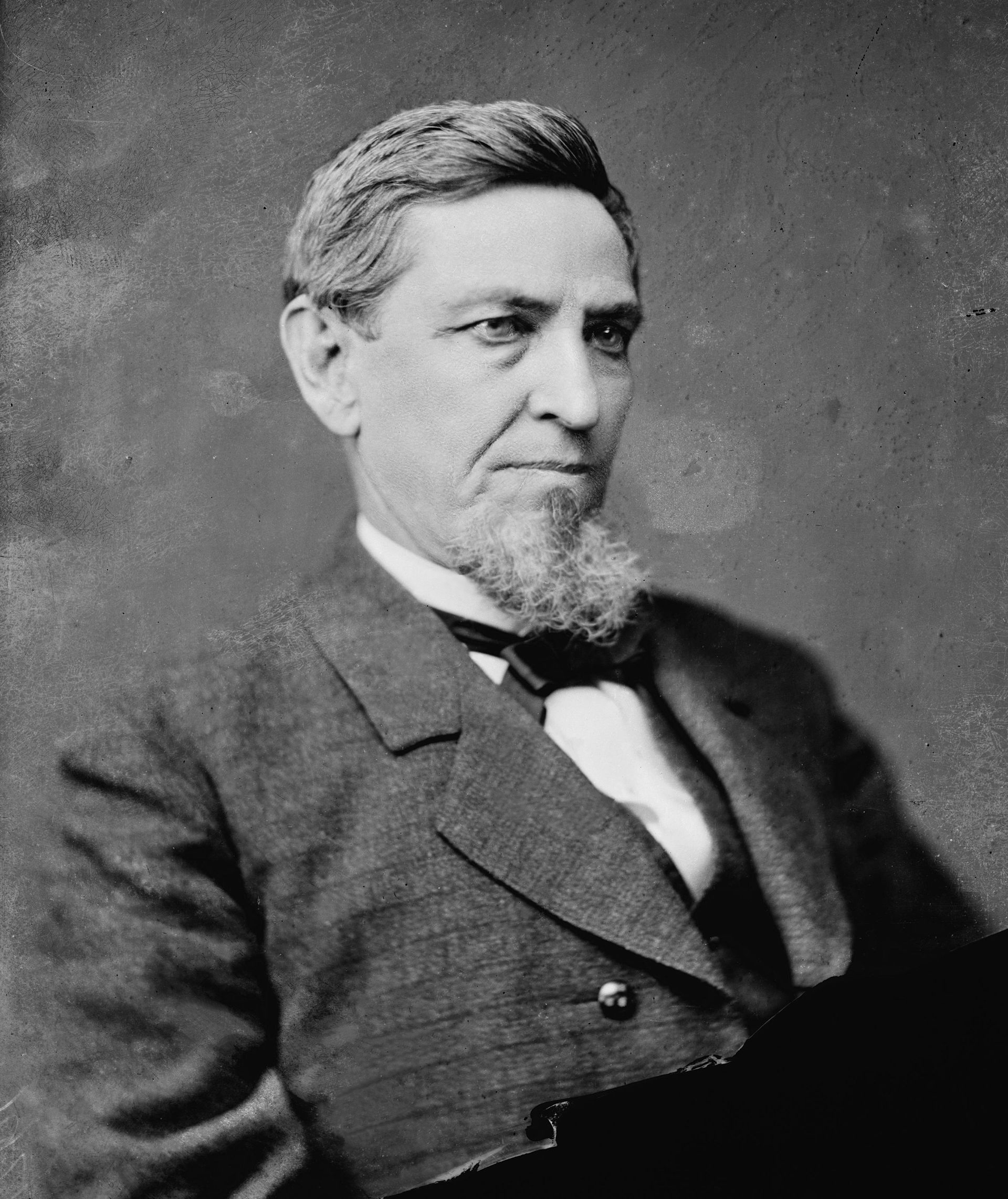

United States Senator from Texas
- In office March 31, 1870 – March 3, 1877
- Preceded by: John Hemphill
- Succeeded by: Richard Coke

Personal details
- Born: February 25, 1809 Madison County, Alabama, U.S.
- Died: November 21, 1893 (aged 84) San Diego, California, U.S.
- Resting place: Oakwood Cemetery
- Party: Republican; Liberal Republican
- Relations: Andrew Jackson Hamilton (brother)

Morgan Calvin Hamilton (February 25, 1809 – November 21, 1893) was an American merchant, politician from Alabama and Texas, and brother of Andrew Jackson Hamilton. Both men were unusual as Unionists in Texas during the American Civil War.

== Biography ==
Morgan Calvin Hamilton was born on February 25, 1809 in Madison County, Alabama near Huntsville. His brother was Andrew Jackson Hamilton. Both brothers were educated in common schools.

He was a clerk for a merchant in Elyton, Alabama until 1830, when he moved to Texas, which was still part of Mexico. He worked in Texas as a merchant and settled in Austin in 1837. For six years, from 1839 to 1845, he served in the war department of the Republic of Texas, first as clerk and from 1844 to 1845 as Secretary of War. During the American Civil War he did business in Austin.

In 1867 Hamilton was appointed comptroller of the Texas state treasury, in which capacity he served until 1868.

Both Morgan Calvin and Andrew Jackson Hamilton were delegates to the second Texas constitutional convention, which gathered in 1868 and 1869 to draft a new state constitution. Morgan believed that secession (and, in turn, the Texas government's actions while it was a part of the Confederacy) was illegitimate, and that the western region of Texas should be split off into its own state. He recommended that Radical Republican leader Edmund J. Davis be chairman of the convention, whereas Andrew suggested Colbert Caldwell, another delegate. Davis was voted in as convention chairman. Some historians have criticized Hamilton for "[having] worked to destroy the influence of men who had been wartime Confederates" during the convention. On July 3, 1868 the convention gave the task of going to Washington to give Congress a report on ongoing crime in Texas to Hamilton and Caldwell; the goal was to convince Congress to pass legislation that would give political positions to Republicans.

Along with several other politicians in the area, Hamilton had partial ownership of the newspaper the Austin Republican. He sold his share to A. H. Longley in October 1867. In 1868 the San Antonio Express-News reported that, since Hamilton's split from the newspaper, the Austin Republican had published personal attacks against him.

On February 22, 1870, he was elected by the Texas Legislature to a short term in the United States Senate as a Radical Republican; he thus became the first Republican senator of Texas. He was reelected to a longer term in 1871. While in Congress, Hamilton voted for the Ku Klux Klan Act, but against the Civil Rights Act of 1875. He used his position as Senator to push for the appointments of conservative Republicans to federal positions. He was on the Committee on Public Lands, the Committee on Pensions and the Committee on Railroads. The Texas state legislature was subject to criticism by Hamilton, who claimed it was "overriding the State constitution, exploiting the people, and destroying their liberties".

Near the end of his term in 1877 a controversy arose in the Texas legislature regarding whether incumbent Texas governor Richard Coke, John Hancock or John Ireland should fill Hamilton's seat in the Senate. People suspected that Coke, whose governorship was already criticized for his mismanagement of the economy and failure to reduce crime rates, had a conflict of interest with lieutenant governor Richard B. Hubbard and planned to become a senator solely to let Hubbard take his place as governor. Hancock and Ireland received detraction as well for their respective oppositions to the ideals of the Confederacy and the new Texas state constitution. Coke ultimately won by 68 votes to 49.

Hamilton retired after leaving office and moved to Brooklyn, New York. In September 1893 he travelled to San Diego, California to spend the winter. He died of bronchitis on November 21, 1893 at the Horton House in San Diego, at the age of 84. He had never married. Since nobody in San Diego knew him, the authorities could not identify the body or notify his relatives, who resided in Austin, until November 23. His body arrived in Austin on November 28 and was buried in the Oakwood Cemetery.

== Works cited ==
- Guttery, Ben R. (2001). Representing Texas : a comprehensive history of U.S. and Confederate senators and representatives from Texas. [North Charleston, SC] : [BookSurge Publishing]. ISBN 978-1-4196-7884-4.
- Kingston, Mike (1992). The Texas almanac's political history of Texas. Austin, Tex. : Eakin Press. ISBN 978-0-89015-855-5.
- Ramsdell, Charles W. (Charles William) (1910). Reconstruction in Texas. New York, Columbia University.
- Barr, Alwyn (1999). Reconstruction to reform : Texas politics, 1876-1906. Dallas, TX : Southern Methodist University Press. ISBN 978-0-87074-444-0.
- Moneyhon, Carl H. (2010). Edmund J. Davis of Texas: Civil War general, Republican leader, Reconstruction governor. The Texas biography series. Fort Worth, Tex: TCU Press. ISBN 978-0-87565-405-8.
- McPherson, Lewin Dwinell (1957). Calhoun, Hamilton, Baskin, and related families. [n. p.] c1957.
- Wallace, Ernest (1979). The howling of the coyotes : reconstruction efforts to divide Texas. College Station : Texas A&M University Press. ISBN 978-0-89096-083-7.
- Moneyhon, Carl H. (1980). Republicanism in Reconstruction Texas. Austin : University of Texas Press. ISBN 978-0-292-77553-4.

U.S. Senate
Preceded by vacant^{(1)}	U.S. senator (Class 2) from Texas; 1870–1877; Served alongside: James W. Flanagan, Samuel B. Maxey	Succeeded by Richard Coke
Notes and references
1. Because Texas seceded from the Union in 1861, seat was declared vacant from 1861-1870 when John Hemphill withdrew from the Senate.
