= Webster Flanagan =

Texas state senator (1832–1924)

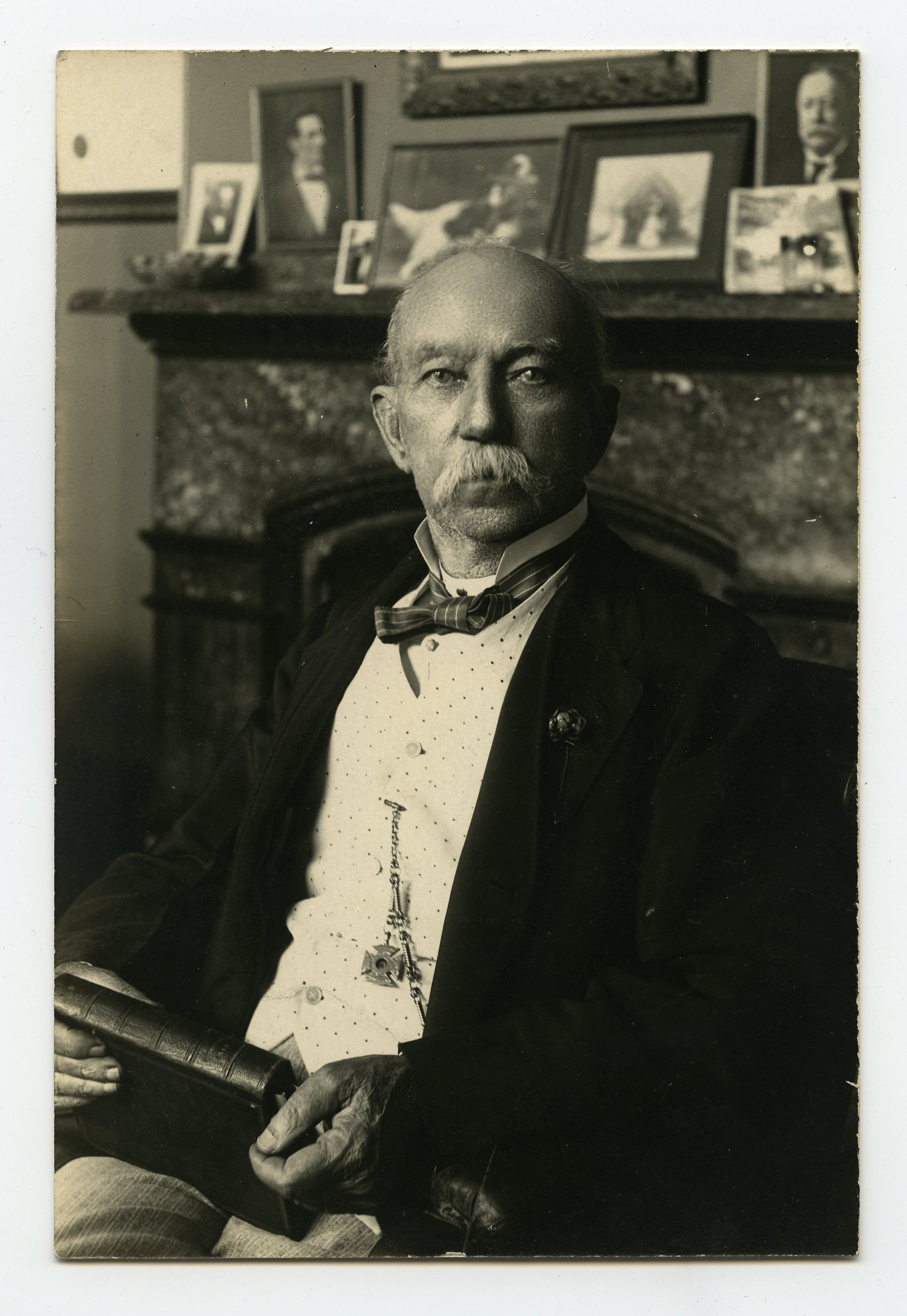
- Photo of Flanagan from the Texas State Archives

Member of the Texas Senate from the 5th district
- In office February 10, 1870 – April 18, 1876
- Preceded by: John G. Brown
- Succeeded by: Francis M. Henry

Personal details
- Born: January 9, 1832 Cloverport, Kentucky, U.S.
- Died: May 5, 1924 (aged 92) Henderson, Texas, U.S.
- Party: Republican
- Spouse(s): Elizabeth Graham (m. 1853; died 1872) Sallie Phillip Ware (m. 1878)
- Parent: James W. Flanagan

Military service
- Allegiance: Confederate States
- Branch/service: Confederate States Army

David Webster Flanagan (January 9, 1832 – May 5, 1924) was a Republican state senator in Texas. His father, James Winright Flanagan, served as Lieutenant Governor and U.S. Senator from Texas.

A Unionist before the American Civil War, he nevertheless served in the Confederate Army.

He and his father were delegates at the Texas Constitutional Convention held in 1868 and 1869 after which they supported dividing Texas into three states. Web Flanagan was also a delegate at the 1875 Texas Constitutional Convention. After his first wife died he remarried.

He married Elizabeth Graham in 1853. They had six children: Charles C., Emmet C., Marian, Horace B., and Bonnie May. Elizabeth Flanagan died in 1872. In 1878 he married Sallie Phillip Ware and they had several children together.

He was involved in a legal dispute over land. Hill High School was constructed on land that was once part of his estate.

He opposed Governor Edmund Jackson Davis' state police initiatives.

Flanagan was buried in the Flanagan Cemetery in Henderson, Texas.

Party political offices
Preceded by F. Marion Martin	Republican nominee for Governor of Texas; 1890	Succeeded by George W. Clark
