= Edward Bradford Pickett =

American politician (1823–1882)

Member of the Texas Senate from the 1st district
- In office February 21, 1870 – January 13, 1874
- Preceded by: Frederick Forney Foscue
- Succeeded by: Edwin Hobby

Member of the Texas House of Representatives from the 1st district
- In office November 4, 1861 – March 1, 1862
- Preceded by: Solomon H. Pirkey
- Succeeded by: Isaiah Junker

Personal details
- Born: December 23, 1823 Buckingham County, Virginia, U.S.
- Died: January 26, 1882 (aged 58) Liberty, Texas, U.S.
- Spouse: Virginia Orange Bell
- Children: 5
- Parent(s): Hugh W. Pickett; Louanna Looper

Edward Bradford Pickett (1823–1882) was an attorney, a Confederate soldier, a Texas senator, and the president of Texas Constitutional Convention.

== Life ==
Pickett was born in 1823 in Buckingham County, Virginia. He served as a private in the U. S. Army in the War against Mexico, in 1845. "His service in the U.S. Army during the War against Mexico prompted his move to Texas. But before that, he married Virginia Orange Bell. During the 1850s, he served as a lawyer in several southeastern Texas counties. He had a brother named Howell L. Pickett.

== Politics ==
He was elected as a representative for the 1st district of the Texas House of Representatives from November 4, 1861, until March 1, 1862. He returned to the state legislature in 1870, this time representing the 1st district in the Texas Senate. He served until January 13, 1874.
