= Donald Campbell (Texas politician) =

American politician

Donald Campbell (March 25, 1830 – November 6, 1871) was a Texas politician who served as lieutenant governor of Texas and was a member of the Texas Senate. He was a Radical Republican.

== Personal life ==
Donald Campbell was born on March 25, 1830, in Alabama. He attended Knoxville College in Tennessee, graduating in 1849 with distinction. In 1858, He moved to Jefferson, Texas, in Marion County where he worked as a druggist and insurance agent. By 1865 he was married with 3 children and had a prosperous estate, including 125 acres of farm land and 5 slaves. He would become an agent for the United States Internal Revenue Service around 1866. He was commonly known as "Don".

Campbell died in Austin, Texas, on November 6, (Note: The Texas Legislative References states his death date to be November 6, 1871, along with images of his gravestone at the Texas State Cemetery. However, the Texas Historical Association states he died on November 8, 1871.) 1871. His final resting place is the Texas State Cemetery.

== Political career ==
Due to his status as an old-line Whig and avid Unionist, Campell became politically prominent during the Reconstruction era.

In 1868, federal authorities removed most of the county officials in Marion County since they saw them as being disloyal which led to Campbell being appointed Chief Justice of Marion County. He would later be elected as a delegate to the constitutional convention of 1868 and 1869, replacing the seat of Aaron Grimsby. Due to Campbells cooperation with the military government, in 1868 Marion County Democrats became suspicious of him and he was arrested and imprisoned temporarily by county authorities on suspicion of falsely swearing the Union oath. District Judge Colbert Caldwell ruled Campbell had committed no crime and ordered for his release.
