= 2006 Texas Senate election =

- November 7, 2006

16 of the 31 seats in the Texas Senate 16 seats needed for a majority
	Majority party	Minority party	Third party
Party	Republican	Democratic	Libertarian
Last election	19 seats	12 seats	0 seats
Seats before	19	12	0
Seats won	20	11	0
Seat change	▲1	▼1	Steady
Popular vote	1,337,435	637,115	183,355
Percentage	61.98%	29.52%	8.50%
Swing	▼1.52%	▼6.47%	▲8.02%
- Senate results by district Republican hold Democratic hold Republican gain No election
President Pro Tempore before election
Republican
Elected President Pro Tempore
Republican

The 2006 Texas Senate election was held on Tuesday, November 7, 2006.

Fifteen of the sixteen elections for the Texas Senate were contested to some extent. The winners of this election served in the 80th Texas Legislature. Five Senators chose to not run or were defeated in the primaries.

== Predictions ==
Source	Ranking	As of
Rothenberg	Safe R	November 4, 2006

== Summary of Results ==
Party	Candidates	Votes		Seats				
Party	Candidates	No.	%	Before	Up	Won	After	+/–
Republican	14	1,337,435	61.98%	19	10	11	20	▲1
Democratic	9	637,115	29.52%	12	6	5	11	▼1
Libertarian	9	183,355	8.50%	0	0	0	0	Steady
Total		2,157,977	100.00	31	16	16	31	Steady

Popular vote
Republican	61.98%
Democratic	29.52%
Libertarian	8.50%

Senate seats won
Republican	68.75%
Democratic	31.25%

=== Results by district ===
District	Democratic		Republican		Libertarian		Total		Result
District	Votes	%	Votes	%	Votes	%	Votes	%	Result
District 1	-	-	109,450	83.13%	22,211	16.87%	131,661	100.00%	Republican hold
District 2	-	-	92,431	78.68%	25,043	21.32%	117,474	100.00%	Republican hold
District 3	-	-	119,629	100.00%	-	-	119,629	100.00%	Republican hold
District 5	59,671	34.62%	105,979	61.48%	6,719	3.90%	172,369	100.00%	Republican hold
District 7	52,586	30.81%	118,067	69.19%	-	-	170,653	100.00%	Republican hold
District 8	-	-	127,590	100.00%	-	-	127,590	100.00%	Republican hold
District 12	55,380	32.35%	109,513	63.98%	6,273	3.66%	171,166	100.00%	Republican hold
District 13	90,148	100.00%	-	-	-	-	90,148	100.00%	Democratic hold
District 14	127,223	80.32%	-	-	31,108	19.68%	158,403	100.00%	Democratic hold
District 15	56,884	63.01%	33,396	36.99%	-	-	90,280	100.00%	Democratic hold
District 17	-	-	88,483	77.82%	25,212	22.18%	113,695	100.00%	Republican hold
District 18	-	-	110,512	78.92%	29,511	21.08%	140,023	100.00%	Republican GAIN
District 19	58,876	59.17%	40,621	40.83%	-	-	99,497	100.00%	Democratic hold
District 22	-	-	112,765	80.60%	27,141	19.40%	139,906	100.00%	Republican hold
District 25	84,816	37.23%	132,872	58.32%	10,137	4.45%	227,825	100.00%	Republican hold
District 29	51,531	58.79%	36,127	41.21%	-	-	87,658	100.00%	Democratic hold
Total	637,115	29.52%	1,337,435	61.98%	183,355	8.50%	2,157,977	100.00%	Source:

== Detailed results ==
=== District 1 ===
District 1 general election
Party	Candidate	Votes	%
Republican	Kevin P. Eltife (incumbent)	109,450	83.13
Libertarian	Jason Albers	22,211	16.86
Total votes		131,661	100.00
Republican hold			

=== District 2 ===
District 2 general election
Party	Candidate	Votes	%
Republican	Bob Deuell (incumbent)	92,431	78.68
Libertarian	Dennis Kaptain	25,043	21.31
Total votes		117,474	100.00
Republican hold			

=== District 3 ===
Race uncontested after Nichols’ win in the Republican primary.

District 3 general election
Party	Candidate	Votes	%
Republican	Robert Nichols	119,629	100.00
Total votes		119,629	100.00
Republican hold			

=== District 5 ===
District 5 general election
Party	Candidate	Votes	%
Republican	Steve Ogden (incumbent)	105,979	61.48
Democratic	Stephen Wyman	59,671	34.61
Libertarian	Darrell R. Grear	6,719	3.89
Total votes		172,369	100.00
Republican hold			

=== District 7 ===
District 7 general election
Party	Candidate	Votes	%
Republican	Dan Patrick	118,067	69.18
Democratic	F. Michael Kubosh	52,586	30.81
Total votes		170,653	100.00
Republican hold			

=== District 8 ===
District 8 general election
Party	Candidate	Votes	%
Republican	Florence Shapiro (incumbent)	127,590	100.00
Total votes		127,590	100.00
Republican hold			

=== District 12 ===
District 12 general election
Party	Candidate	Votes	%
Republican	Jane Nelson (incumbent)	109,513	63.98
Democratic	Dwight B. Fullingim	55,380	32.35
Libertarian	Morgan Ware	6,273	3.66
Total votes		171,166	100.00
Republican hold			

=== District 13 ===
District 13 general election
Party	Candidate	Votes	%
Democratic	Rodney Ellis (incumbent)	90,148	100.00
Total votes		90,148	100.00
Democratic hold			

=== District 14 ===
District 14 general election
Party	Candidate	Votes	%
Democratic	Kirk Watson	127,223	80.31
Libertarian	Robert "Rock" Howard	31,180	19.68
Total votes		158,403	100.00
Democratic hold			

=== District 15 ===
District 15 general election
Party	Candidate	Votes	%
Democratic	John Whitmire (incumbent)	56,884	63.00
Republican	Angel DeLaRosa	33,396	36.99
Total votes		90,280	100.00
Democratic hold			

=== District 17 ===
District 17 general election
Party	Candidate	Votes	%
Republican	Kyle Janek (incumbent)	88,483	77.82
Libertarian	Phil Kurtz	25,212	22.17
Total votes		113,695	100.00
Republican hold			

=== District 18 ===
Incumbent Democratic Senator Ken Armbrister did not run for re-election. No other Democrat ran to replace him, allowing Republican Glen Hegar to easily win the race, flipping the seat.

District 18 general election
Party	Candidate	Votes	%
Republican	Glenn Hegar	110,512	78.92
Libertarian	Roy O. Wright II	29,511	21.07
Total votes		140,023	100.00
Republican gain from Democratic			

=== District 19 ===
Incumbent Frank Madla was ousted by Uresti in contentious Democratic primary race. Madla was the only incumbent senator to lose a primary race in 2006.

District 19 general election
Party	Candidate	Votes	%
Democratic	Carlos I. Uresti	58,876	59.17
Republican	Dick Bowen	40,621	40.82
Total votes		99,497	100.00
Democratic hold			

=== District 22 ===
District 22 general election
Party	Candidate	Votes	%
Republican	Kip Averitt	112,765	80.60
Libertarian	Phil Smart	27,141	19.39
Total votes		139,906	100.00
Republican hold			

=== District 25 ===
District 25 general election
Party	Candidate	Votes	%
Republican	Jeff Wentworth (incumbent)	132,872	58.32
Democratic	Kathleen “Kathi” Thomas	84,816	37.22
Libertarian	James R. “Bob” Thompson	10,137	4.44
Total votes		227,825	100.00
Republican hold			

=== District 29 ===
This was considered by some to be an extremely important Texas Senate election race. Thought to potentially add to the competitiveness of this Senate race was District 29's historically low-voter turnout and Republican "Dee" Margo's close connections to President George W. Bush via First Lady Laura Bush's close friendship to "Dee" Margo's spouse, El Pasoan Adair Margo. As it turned out, Shapleigh won reelection in a race that was not that close.

District 29 general election
Party	Candidate	Votes	%
Democratic	Eliot Shapleigh (incumbent)	51,531	58.78
Republican	Donald R. “Dee” Margo	36,127	41.21
Total votes		87,658	100.00
Democratic hold			
