= Mayoral elections in Plano, Texas =

Elections for mayor in Plano, Texas

Elections are currently held every four years to elect the Mayor of Plano, Texas. Since 1884, the Mayor of Plano had been serving two year terms. The term length was changed to 3 years in 2006, and again to 4 years in 2011.

Since elections for city council members are held in both Collin County and Denton County, the voting results from the two counties are combined for the purpose of this article.

== 2013 ==
2013 Plano mayoral election
- May 11, 2013
- Turnout: 4.88% (Collin); 8.14% (Denton)
Candidate	Harry LaRosiliere	Fred Moses
Party	Nonpartisan	Nonpartisan
Popular vote	6,920	4,698
Percentage	59.56%	40.44%
Mayor before election
Phil Dyer
Republican
Elected mayor
Harry LaRosiliere
Republican

The 2013 Plano mayoral election was held on May 11, 2013. It saw the election of Harry LaRosiliere, a former member of the city council.

Election results
Candidate	Votes (Collin)	Votes (Denton)	Total	%
Harry LaRosiliere	6,757	163	6,920	59.56
Fred Moses	4,598	100	4,698	40.44
Total votes	11,355	263	11,618	100

== 2017 ==
2017 Plano mayoral election
- May 6, 2017
- Turnout: 11.89% (Collin); 9.60% (Denton)
Candidate	Harry LaRosiliere	Lily Bao
Party	Nonpartisan	Nonpartisan
Popular vote	14,193	11,513
Percentage	52.20%	42.34%
Candidate	Douglas Reeves	Bill Lisle III
Party	Nonpartisan	Nonpartisan
Popular vote	963	523
Percentage	3.54%	1.92
Mayor before election
Harry LaRosiliere
Republican
Elected mayor
Harry LaRosiliere
Republican

The 2017 Plano mayoral election was held on May 6, 2017. It saw the reelection of the incumbent mayor Harry LaRosiliere.

Election results
Candidate	Votes (Collin)	Votes (Denton)	Total	%
Harry LaRosiliere	13,923	270	14,193	52.20
Lily Bao	11,260	253	11,513	42.34
Douglas Reeves	947	16	963	3.54
Bill Lisle III	508	15	523	1.92
Total votes	34,157	814	34,971	100

== 2021 ==
2021 Plano mayoral election
- May 1, 2021
- Turnout: 14.72% (Collin); 8.84% (Denton)
Candidate	John Muns	Lily Bao	Lydia Ortega
Party	Nonpartisan	Nonpartisan	Nonpartisan
Popular vote	18,482	15,119	1,370
Percentage	52.85%	43.23%	3.92%
Mayor before election
Harry LaRosiliere
Republican
Elected mayor
John Muns
Republican

The 2021 Plano mayoral election was held on May 1, 2021. John Muns, a member of the city council, won the election and became the 40th mayor of Plano.

Election results
Candidate	Votes (Collin)	Votes (Denton)	Total	%
John Muns	18,104	378	18,482	52.85
Lily Bao	14,705	414	15,119	43.23
Lydia Ortega	1,348	22	1,370	3.92
Total votes	34,157	814	34,971	100
