= Jeran Akers =

Former Mayor of Plano, Texas

Mayor of Plano, Texas
- In office 2000–2002
- Preceded by: John Longstreet
- Succeeded by: Pat Evans

Personal details
- Party: Republican
- Education: University of Alabama (BS)
- Occupation: Politician

Merrideth Jeran Akers (1947 - 2023) was the mayor of Plano, Texas from 2000–2002, and ran for the Republican nomination for Collin County Commissioner in 2006.

== Early life and career ==
Akers was born in Cordova, Alabama. Akers graduated from the University of Alabama in 1969 with a Bachelor of Science in Marketing. While a student at Alabama, Akers was a member of the Air Force ROTC and the Lambda Chi Alpha fraternity, as well as the Arnold Air Society. He served in the United States Air Force from 1969 to 1973, earning the rank of captain. While in the Air Force, Akers received a Master of Arts in Public Administration. After the Air Force, Akers moved to Texas in 1975 and lived in Plano, Texas since 1985.

== Political career ==
Akers served on the Plano City Council from 1993-1999, including as Deputy Mayor Pro Tem from 1997–1998 and Mayor Pro Tem from 1998-1999.

Akers was elected mayor on May 6, 2000, with 64.17% of the vote, defeating opponent Dick Bode. While Mayor of Plano, Akers founded the Collin County Mayors’ Alliance and was a member of the Metroplex Mayor’s Alliance.

Akers served one term as mayor before being defeated by Pat Evans in 2002.

== Post-mayor life ==
In 2006, Akers lost election the Republican Primary for county commissioner to Jack Hatchell. From 2010 to 2013, Akers was the president and CEO of the Celina Chamber of Commerce.

Preceded by John Longstreet	Mayor of Plano, Texas; 2000-2002	Succeeded by Pat Evans
