= Senator Harris =

Senator Harris may refer to:

== Members of the United States Senate ==
- Fred R. Harris (1930 - 2024), U.S. Senator from Oklahoma from 1964 to 1973
- Ira Harris (1802–1875), U.S. Senator from New York from 1861 to 1867
- Isham G. Harris (1818–1897), U.S. Senator of Tennessee from 1877 to 1897
- John S. Harris (1825–1906), U.S. Senator from Louisiana from 1868 to 1871
- Kamala Harris (born 1964), U.S. Senator from California from 2017 to 2021
- William Alexander Harris (Kansas politician) (1841–1909), U.S. Senator from Kansas from 1897 to 1903
- William J. Harris (1868–1932), U.S. Senator from Georgia from 1919 to 1932

== United States state senate members ==
- Addison C. Harris (1840–1916), Indiana State Senate
- Andrew L. Harris (1835–1915), Ohio State Senate
- Andy Harris (politician) (born 1957), Maryland State Senate
- Becky Harris (born 1968), Nevada State Senate
- Benjamin W. Harris (1823–1907), Massachusetts State Senate
- Bill Harris (Ohio politician) (1934–2017), Ohio State Senate
- Broughton Harris (1822–1899), Vermont State Senate
- Charles L. Harris (general) (1834–1910), Nebraska State Senate
- Chris Harris (Texas politician) (1948–2015), Texas State Senate
- Dallas Harris (fl. 2010s), Nevada State Senate
- Ernie Harris (politician) (born 1947), Kentucky State Senate
- Fred Harris (lawyer) (1910–1979), Texas State Senate
- Hamilton Harris (1820–1900), New York State Senate
- James Harris (North Carolina politician) (1832–1891), North Carolina State Senate
- Jeptha Vining Harris (Mississippi general) (1816–1899), Mississippi State Senate
- John P. Harris (died 1926), Pennsylvania State Senate
- John Harris (Wisconsin politician) (1856–1933), Wisconsin State Senate
- Jonathan Harris (politician) (born 1964), Connecticut State Senate
- Joseph Harris (Wisconsin politician) (1813–1889), Wisconsin State Senate
- Kenneth R. Harris (1935–2009), North Carolina State Senate
- Lee Harris (politician) (born 1978), Tennessee State Senate
- Mark Harris (Idaho politician) (fl. 2010s), Idaho State Senate
- Mark Harris (Maine politician) (1779–1843), Maine State Senate
- Merrill W. Harris (1894–1967), Vermont State Senate
- Napoleon Harris (born 1979), Illinois State Senate
- Nathaniel Edwin Harris (1846–1929), Georgia State Senate
- Sampson Willis Harris (1809–1857), Alabama State Senate
- William C. Harris (Illinois politician) (1921–2004), Illinois State Senate
