= 2017 Plano municipal elections =

Plano municipal election, 2017
- May 6, 2017 and June 10, 2017
- Turnout: 17.10%
| Candidate | Harry LaRosiliere | Lily Bao |
| Popular vote | 14,193 | 11,513 |
| Percentage | 52.20% | 42.34% |
- LaRosiliere: 40–50% 50–60% 60–70% 70–80% 80–90% >90% Bao: 40–50% 50–60% 60–70% Tie: 40–50%
Mayor before election
Harry LaRosiliere
Elected mayor
Harry LaRosiliere

The 2017 Plano municipal election was an election to the Plano City Council in the city of Plano, Texas on May 6, 2017. Along with the mayoral election (Place 6), seats were contested for Places 2, 4, and 8.

Since no candidate received more than 50% of the vote in Places 2 and 8, a runoff was held on June 10, 2017 for these races.

== Council seats ==
=== Place 2 ===
The incumbent, Ben Harris, was term-limited. Alfonso Valente, Ann Bacchus, and Anthony Ricciardelli stood for election.

| Candidate | Vote number | Vote percentage |
|---|---|---|
| Anthony Ricciardelli | 11,535 | 46.30% |
| Ann Bacchus | 7,010 | 25.96% |
| Alfonso Valente | 6,467 | 27.74% |

==== Runoff ====
No candidate received 50% of the votes, so a runoff election was held on June 10, 2017.

| Candidate | Vote number | Vote percentage |
|---|---|---|
| Ann Bacchus | 8,553 | 46.92% |
| Anthony Ricciardelli | 9,676 | 53.80% |

=== Place 4 ===
The incumbent, Lissa Smith, was term-limited. Kayci Prince and Edward "Ed" Acklin stood for election.

| Candidate | Vote number | Vote percentage |
|---|---|---|
| Kayci Prince | 12,479 | 52.36% |
| Ed Acklin | 11,352 | 47.64% |

=== Place 6 (mayor) ===
Incumbent Harry LaRosiliere, the first African-American mayor of Plano, ran for re-election, and the challengers were Leilei "Lily" Bao, Bill Lisle III, and Douglas Reeves.

| Candidate | Vote number | Vote percentage |
|---|---|---|
| Harry LaRosiliere | 14,193 | 52.20% |
| Lily Bao | 11,513 | 42.34% |
| Douglas Reeves | 963 | 3.54% |
| Bill Lisle III | 523 | 1.92% |

=== Place 8 ===
David Downs, the incumbent, along with Stirling Morris and Rick Smith, stood for election.

| Candidate | Vote number | Vote percentage |
|---|---|---|
| Rick Smith | 11,400 | 48.86% |
| David Downs | 8,419 | 36.08% |
| Stirling Morris | 3,514 | 15.06% |

==== Runoff ====
No candidate received 50% of the votes, so a runoff election was held on June 10, 2017.

| Candidate | Vote number | Vote percentage |
|---|---|---|
| David Downs | 8,285 | 46.80% |
| Rick Smith | 9,417 | 53.20% |

== Propositions ==
=== Proposition 1 ===
The following question appeared on the ballot:

The issuance of $90,270,000 general obligation bonds for street improvements and the levy of a tax in payment thereof.

| | Vote number | Vote percentage |
|---|---|---|
| For | 18,532 | 72.61% |
| Against | 6,992 | 27.39% |

=== Proposition 2 ===
The following question appeared on the ballot:

The issuance of $29,000,000 general obligation bonds for public safety improvements and the levy of a tax in payment thereof.

| | Vote number | Vote percentage |
|---|---|---|
| For | 18,061 | 70.77% |
| Against | 7,460 | 29.23% |

=== Proposition 3 ===
The following question appeared on the ballot:

The issuance of $78,850,000 general obligation bonds for park improvements and the levy of a tax in payment thereof.

| | Vote number | Vote percentage |
|---|---|---|
| For | 16,135 | 63.55% |
| Against | 9,253 | 36.45% |

=== Proposition 4 ===
The following question appeared on the ballot:

The issuance of $12,500,000 general obligation bonds for recreation centers and the levy of a tax in payment thereof.

| | Vote number | Vote percentage |
|---|---|---|
| For | 15,717 | 62.04% |
| Against | 9,616 | 37.96% |

=== Proposition 5 ===
The following question appeared on the ballot:

The issuance of $10,000,000 general obligation bonds for library facilities and the levy of a tax in payment thereof.

| | Vote number | Vote percentage |
|---|---|---|
| For | 17,233 | 67.86% |
| Against | 8,161 | 32.14% |

=== Proposition 6 ===
The following question appeared on the ballot:

The issuance of $3,500,000 general obligation bonds for Collinwood House and historic preservation structures and the levy of a tax in payment thereof.

| | Vote number | Vote percentage |
|---|---|---|
| Against | 12,807 | 51.14% |
| For | 12,236 | 48.86% |
