= 2006 Texas Legislature election =

2006 Texas Legislature election may refer to:

- 2006 Texas Senate election
- 2006 Texas House of Representatives election
