= 2019 Plano municipal elections =

Plano municipal election, 2019
- May 4, 2019 and June 8, 2019
- Turnout: 9.14% ▼

The 2019 Plano municipal election was an election to the Plano City Council in the city of Plano, Texas on May 4, 2019. Seats were contested for Places 1, 3, 5, and 7.

Since no candidate received more than 50% of the vote in Places 5 and 7, a runoff was held on June 8, 2019, for these races.

== Council seats ==
=== Place 1 ===
The incumbent, Angela Miner, did not run for re-election. Bill Lisle III, Daniel Long, and Maria Tu ran for the open seat.

Candidate	Vote number	Vote percentage
Maria Tu	7,864	54.89%
Daniel Long	5,436	37.95%
Bill Lisle III	1,026	7.16%

=== Place 3 ===
The incumbent, Rick Grady, ran for re-election. Colleen Aguilar-Epstein challenged him.

Candidate	Vote number	Vote percentage
Rick Grady	7,554	53.92%
Colleen Aguilar-Epstein	6,456	46.08%

=== Place 5 ===
The incumbent, Ron Kelley, ran for re-election. Bryon Abraham Bradford and Shelby Williams challenged him.

Candidate	Vote number	Vote percentage
Ron Kelley	6,765	49.44%
Shelby Williams	5,744	41.97%
Bryon Abraham Bradford	1,176	8.59%

==== Runoff ====
No candidate received 50% of the votes, so a runoff election was held on June 8, 2019.

Candidate	Vote number	Vote percentage
Shelby Williams	8,684	53.84%
Ron Kelley	7,445	46.16%

=== Place 7 ===
The incumbent, Tom Harrison, did not run for re-election. Ann Bacchus, Leilei "Lily" Bao, and LaShon Ross ran for the open seat.

Candidate	Vote number	Vote percentage
Lily Bao	7,057	47.79%
Ann Bacchus	5,202	35.22%
LaShon Ross	2,509	16.99%

==== Runoff ====
No candidate received 50% of the votes, so a runoff election was held on June 8, 2019.

Candidate	Vote number	Vote percentage
Lily Bao	9,675	57.96%
Ann Bacchus	7,018	42.04%

== Propositions ==
=== Proposition A ===
The following question appeared on the ballot:

Shall the City Council of the City of Plano, Texas, be authorized to issue general obligation bonds of the City in the principal amount of $18,750,000 for permanent public improvements and public purposes, to wit: developing, engineering, constructing, reconstructing, improving, repairing, extending, expanding and enhancing streets, thoroughfares, alleys, sidewalks, bridges, intersections, screening walls and other public ways, including participation in joint projects with federal, state and local public entities and agencies, computerized signalization and monitoring equipment and other traffic controls, grade separations, street lighting, noise abatements, necessary and related storm drainage facilities and improvements, and the acquisition of any needed land and rights-of-way therefor; such bonds to mature serially or otherwise over a period not to exceed FORTY (40) years from their date, to be issued and sold in one or more series at any price or prices and to bear interest at any rate or rates (fixed, floating, variable or otherwise) as shall be determined within the discretion of the City Council at the time of issuance or sale of the bonds; and whether ad valorem taxes shall be levied upon all taxable property in the City sufficient to pay the annual interest and provide a sinking fund to pay the bonds at maturity?

	Vote number	Vote percentage
For	10,414	71.66%
Against	4,118	28.34%

=== Proposition B ===
The following question appeared on the ballot:

Shall the City Council of the City of Plano, Texas, be authorized to issue general obligation bonds of the City in the principal amount of $17,890,000 for permanent public improvements and public purposes, to wit: renovating, constructing, developing, improving, expanding, furnishing, equipping and acquiring any needed land and rights-of-way for park and recreational facilities; such bonds to mature serially or otherwise over a period not to exceed FORTY (40) years from their date, to be issued and sold in one or more series at any price or prices and to bear interest at any rate or rates (fixed, floating, variable or otherwise) as shall be determined within the discretion of the City Council at the time of issuance or sale of the bonds; and whether ad valorem taxes shall be levied upon all taxable property in the City sufficient to pay the annual interest and provide a sinking fund to pay the bonds at maturity?

	Vote number	Vote percentage
For	9,071	62.40%
Against	5,465	37.60%

=== Proposition C ===
The following question appeared on the ballot:

Shall the City Council of the City of Plano, Texas, be authorized to issue general obligation bonds of the City in the principal amount of $8,025,000 for permanent public improvements and public purposes, to wit: renovating, improving, repairing, rehabilitating and equipping existing City facilities; such bonds to mature serially or otherwise over a period not to exceed FORTY (40) years from their date, to be issued and sold in one or more series at any price or prices and to bear interest at any rate or rates (fixed, floating, variable or otherwise) as shall be determined within the discretion of the City Council at the time of issuance or sale of the bonds; and whether ad valorem taxes shall be levied upon all taxable property in the City sufficient to pay the annual interest and provide a sinking fund to pay the bonds at maturity?

	Vote number	Vote percentage
For	8,157	57.03%
Against	6,147	42.97%
