= Orland Harris =

American politician (1932–2021)

Member of the Texas Senate from the 8th district
- In office November 21, 1967 – January 10, 1995
- Preceded by: George Parkhouse
- Succeeded by: Florence Shapiro

Member of the Texas House of Representatives from the 51-3 district
- In office November 21, 1962 – January 12, 1965

Personal details
- Born: June 5, 1932 Denton, Texas, U.S.
- Died: July 7, 2021 (aged 89)
- Party: Republican
- Children: 2
- Education: University of North Texas (BA); Southern Methodist University (LLB)

Military service
- Allegiance: United States
- Branch/service: United States Air Force
- Years of service: 1954–1957
- Rank: Captain

Orland Harold "Ike" Harris (June 5, 1932 – July 7, 2021) was an American politician from Texas who served in both houses of the Texas Legislature.

== Biographical sketch ==
Harris was born June 5, 1932, in Denton, Texas. Harris graduated from the University of North Texas in 1954 with a degree in political science. He then served as an instructor pilot in the United States Air Force. He received an honorable discharge with the rank of Captain in 1957. He then earned a Bachelor of Laws from Southern Methodist University School of Law. He was elected to the Texas House of Representatives in 1962 as one of nine Republicans of 150 total members. He was sworn into office on November 21, 1962. He served a single term in the Texas House. In 1967, he was then elected to the Texas Senate joining party convert Henry Grover as one of two Republicans in that chamber. He served in the Senate until 1995. After the decennial redistricting, Harris was drawn into a district with fellow Republican and freshman Senator Florence Shapiro. Harris chose to retire. Shapiro succeeded Harris in the Texas Senate. Harris died in 2021.

Preceded by George Parkhouse	Member of the Texas Senate from the 8th District; 1967–1995	Succeeded by Florence Shapiro
