= Bob Hall (politician) =

American politician

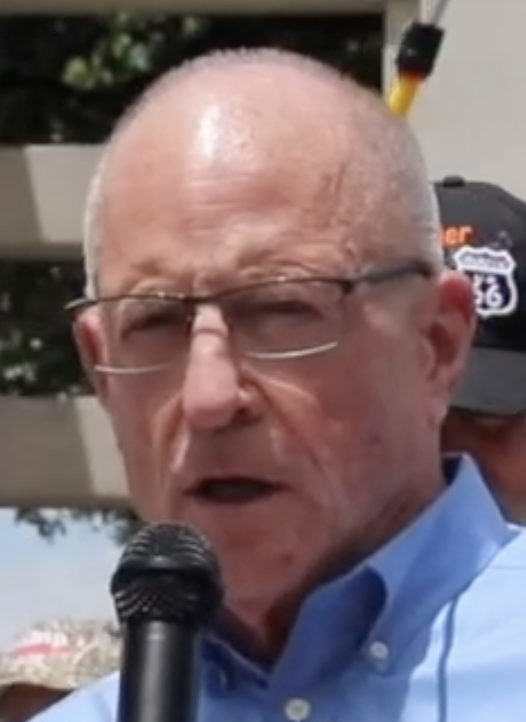
- Hall in 2020

Member of the Texas Senate from the 2nd district
- Incumbent
- Assumed office January 13, 2015
- Preceded by: Bob Deuell

Personal details
- Born: Robert Lee Hall III; March 5, 1942 (age 84) Tampa, Florida, U.S.
- Party: Republican
- Spouse: Sarah Kay Smith Hall
- Children: 3
- Education: The Citadel (BS)
- Occupation: Businessman
- Website: Office website Campaign website

Military service
- Allegiance: United States
- Branch: United States Air Force
- Service years: 1964–1969
- Rank: Captain
- Unit: Space and Missiles Systems

Robert Lee Hall III (born March 5, 1942) is an American politician who is a Republican member of the Texas State Senate. Aligned with the Tea Party movement, he succeeded fellow Republican Bob Deuell, whom he unseated by three hundred votes in the Republican runoff election held on May 27, 2014.

== Early life and education ==
Hall graduated in 1960 from George D. Chamberlain High School in Tampa, Florida. In 1964, Hall received a Bachelor of Science degree in electrical engineering from The Citadel.

== Political career ==
Hall ran against incumbent State Senator Bob Deuell in 2012 but failed to meet constitutional residency requirements. He ran again in 2014. He unseated Deuell in a Republican primary runoff election, 18,230 votes (50.4 percent) to 17,930 (49.6 percent). Hall defeated Libertarian Party nominee, Don Bates, in the November 4 general election.

In the 2018 Republican primary, Hall was challenged by state representative Cindy Burkett, who ran as a politically moderate alternative to him. Hall defeated her in the March 6, 2018, primary election. Hall won his second state Senate term in the general election held on November 6, 2018. With 152,659 votes (59.4 percent), he defeated future Texas Democratic Party chair Kendall Scudder, who finished with 104,528 (40.6 percent).

In 2019, Hall became chairman of the Agriculture committee.

During the COVID-19 pandemic, Hall promoted misinformation about COVID-19 and vaccines, including the debunked conspiracy theory that COVID-19 vaccines skipped animal testing. He encouraged people to not take the vaccine.

He has said of Muslims that they are “required by Sharia to lie” in order to “stay below the radar of being aggressive.”

== Personal life ==
Hall and his wife, the former Sarah Kay Smith, a native of Ladonia in Fannin County in East Texas, live in Tailwind Airpark in Edgewood, a community for pilots and aviation enthusiasts which has its own runway and hangars. The couple is Southern Baptist and has three adult sons.

== Electoral history ==
Republican Primary, 2018: Senate District 2
Candidate		Votes	%	±
✓	Bob Hall	35,561	53.2	
	Cindy Burkett	31,239	46.8	
Majority				
Turnout		66,800		

Texas General Elections 2014: Senate District 2
Party	Candidate	Votes	%	±%
Republican	Bob Hall	99,868	83.6	
Libertarian	Don Bates	19,609	16.4	
Majority				
Turnout		119,477		
Republican hold				

Republican Primary Runoff, 2014: Senate District 2
Candidate		Votes	%	±
✓	Bob Hall	18,230	50.4	
	Bob Deuell	17,930	49.6	
Majority				
Turnout		36,160		

Republican Primary, 2014: Senate District 2
Candidate		Votes	%	±
✓	Bob Hall	19,085	38.8	
✓	Bob Deuell	23,847	48.5	
	Mark Thompson	6,240	12.7	
Majority				
Turnout		49,172		
