= Florence Shapiro =

American politician (born 1948)

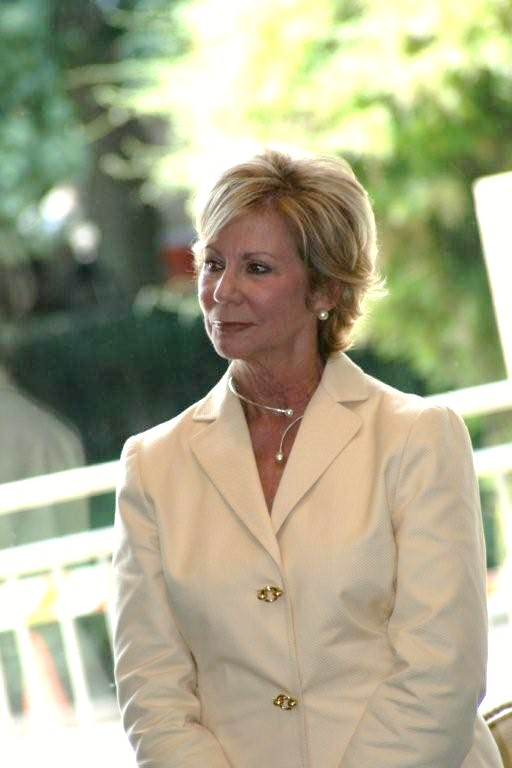

Member of the Texas Senate from the 8th district
- In office January 10, 1995 – January 8, 2013
- Preceded by: O.H. "Ike" Harris
- Succeeded by: Ken Paxton

Member of the Texas Senate from the 2nd district
- In office January 12, 1993 – January 10, 1995
- Preceded by: Ted Lyon
- Succeeded by: David Cain

32nd Mayor of Plano
- In office 1990–1992
- Preceded by: Jack Harvard
- Succeeded by: James Muns

Personal details
- Born: Florence Donald; May 2, 1948 (age 78) New York City, New York, U.S.
- Party: Republican
- Spouse: Howard Shapiro
- Children: 3
- Education: University of Texas at Austin (BS)
- Profession: Teacher, politician, advertising executive, consultant

Florence Donald Shapiro (born May 2, 1948) is an American politician from Texas. Her political career lasted over 30 years and coincided with Plano's growth from a bedroom community of 17,000 to a city of almost 300,000 residents. She served on the Plano City Council from 1979 to 1990 and served as the city's first female and Jewish elected mayor from 1990 to 1992.

As a Republican, Shapiro served in the Texas Senate from 1993 to 2013, representing District 2 from 1993 to 1995 and District 8 from 1995 until her retirement in 2013. Her constituency was centered in Collin County in the Dallas–Fort Worth Metroplex, especially the city of Plano.

In the Texas Senate, Shapiro chaired the State Affairs Committee and the chamber's Education Committee from 2003 to 2013.

== Early life and education ==
A first-generation American, Shapiro was born to German-born Martin and Ann Donald, both Holocaust survivors, in New York City on May 2, 1948. Shapiro's mother was pregnant with her on the ship passage from England to New York City.

After a decade in New York City, the family moved to Dallas, Texas in 1958, and Shapiro attended and graduated from Hillcrest High School. After high school, Shapiro matriculated to The University of Texas at Austin, and was the first in her family to attend college. At UT, she met her husband Howard. and earned a B.S. in secondary education in 1970.

Shapiro began her professional career as a public school English and speech teacher at Richardson High School in Richardson, Texas for two years. She and her husband moved from Richardson to Plano in 1972, when Plano's population was 17,500. In the 1980s, Shapiro founded and operated Shapiro & Company, an advertising, public relations and events firm for 10 years before closing the company due to scheduling demands from her responsibilities in the Texas Senate.

== Political career ==
=== Local politics (1979-1992) ===
Shapiro quit her job as a teacher in 1972 in order to have a baby and turned to community involvement. After several years as an active volunteer in Plano, Shapiro was encouraged to run for the "woman's seat" on the Plano City Council. She won her first election in 1979 by 39 votes and was subsequently elected to serve six terms from 1979 to 1990. During her entire tenure, Shapiro was the only woman on the council. As a council member, Shapiro served as the president of the North Central Texas Council of Governments in 1984 and as President of the Texas Municipal League.

In 1990, Shapiro ran unopposed and was subsequently elected the first female and first Jewish Mayor of Plano. She served one term from 1990 to 1992.

=== Texas Senate (1993-2013) ===
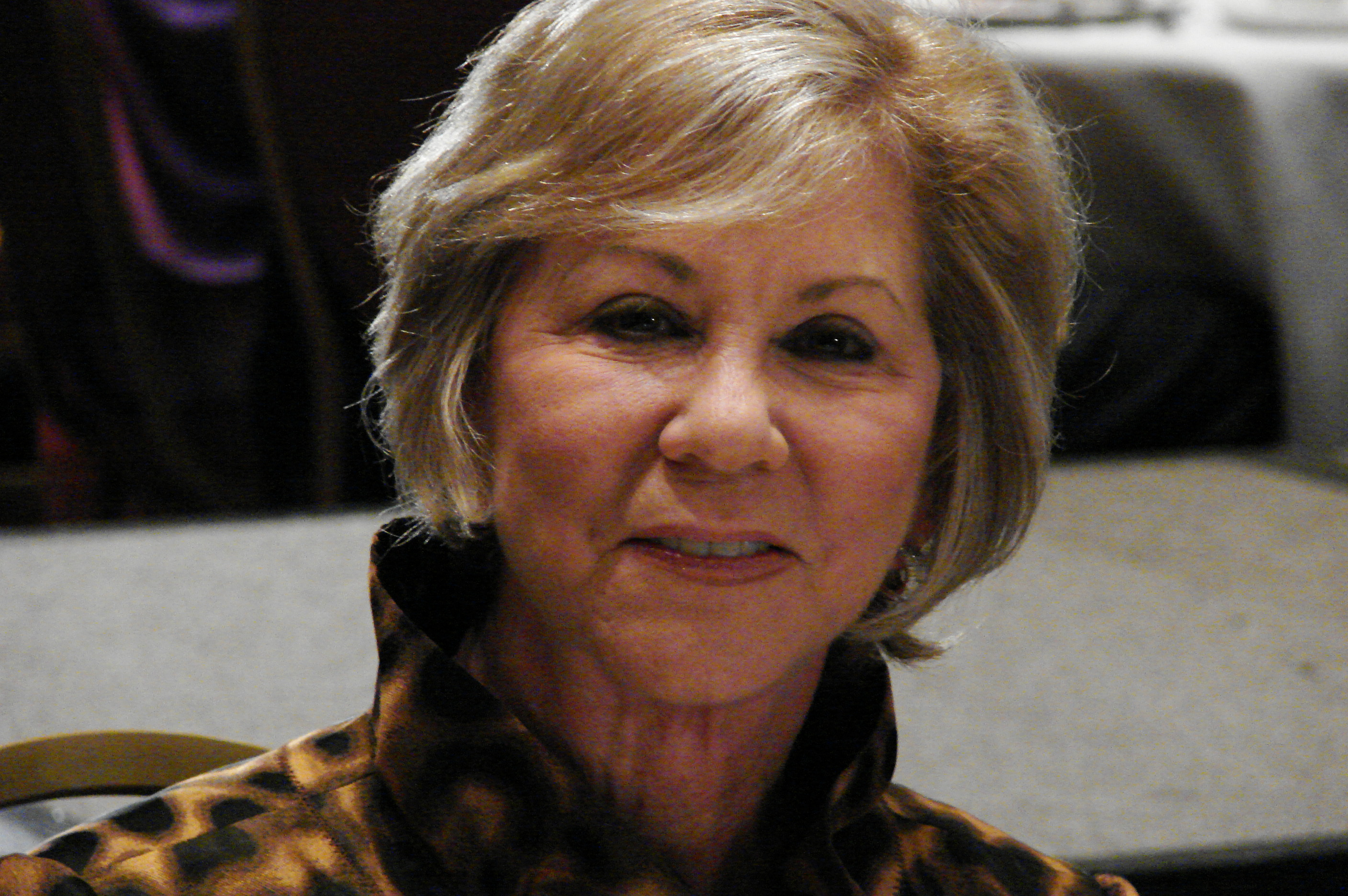
Shapiro in 2009

At the Cotton Bowl parade in 1991, Shapiro's friend Kay Bailey Hutchison, then the Texas State Treasurer, suggested that Shapiro run for the Texas Senate. In 1992, she ran for District 2, which included Collin County and counties in East Texas. Her campaign manager was Karl Rove, who would later work as a top aide to Governor George W. Bush (who would go on to be elected President in 2000). Shapiro was the top vote-getter in the Republican primary against Don Kent and former Plano mayor Jack Harvard, then defeated Kent by 1 percentage point in a hotly-contested run-off election, during which vandals defaced her campaign signs with swastikas due to Shapiro's Jewish faith.

In the general election, Shapiro faced 13-year Democratic incumbent Ted Lyon. The race was so vitriolic that the Dallas Morning News ran an editorial titled "Voters Didn't Deserve This," calling for a lowering of temperatures. Shapiro won by 13 points. After the 1992 election, Shapiro rarely faced serious competition.

In the Texas Senate, Shapiro earned attention for authoring "Ashley's Laws" in 1995 that increased penalties for sex offenders and improved tracking of sex offenders released from prison. In 1993, 7-year-old Ashley Estell was kidnapped, from Carpenter Park in Plano, assaulted, and murdered. "Ashley's Laws" consisted on 12 bills that required, among other things, police departments to publicize the location of sex offenders after their release and require notification of schools of their presence in the area. Shapiro's work earned her the Texas Association Against Sexual Assault's "Champion for Social Change Award". and the Children's Advocacy Centers of Texas's "Legislator of the Year Award" in 2008.

Shapiro was also involved in efforts to advocate for human rights and Holocaust education. President George W. Bush appointed Shapiro to the Honorary Delegation to Jerusalem for the celebration of the 60th anniversary of the State of Israel in May 2008. In 2009, Governor Rick Perry signed Senate Bill 482 co-authored by Shapiro and Rodney Ellis that established an 18-member Texas Holocaust and Genocide Commission, charged with improving Holocaust and genocide education and organizing memorial events in Texas.

==== Governor for a day ====
In January 2005, she was elected President pro tempore of the State Senate, becoming second in the gubernatorial line of succession, behind the Lieutenant Governor of Texas. She was the first senator from Collin County to serve in that position in more than forty years. When both Governor Rick Perry and Lieutenant Governor David Dewhurst were out of the state on official business on April 9, 2005, Shapiro served as the governor for a day, the sixth woman in Texas history to do so.

=== U.S. Senate speculation (2008-2011) ===
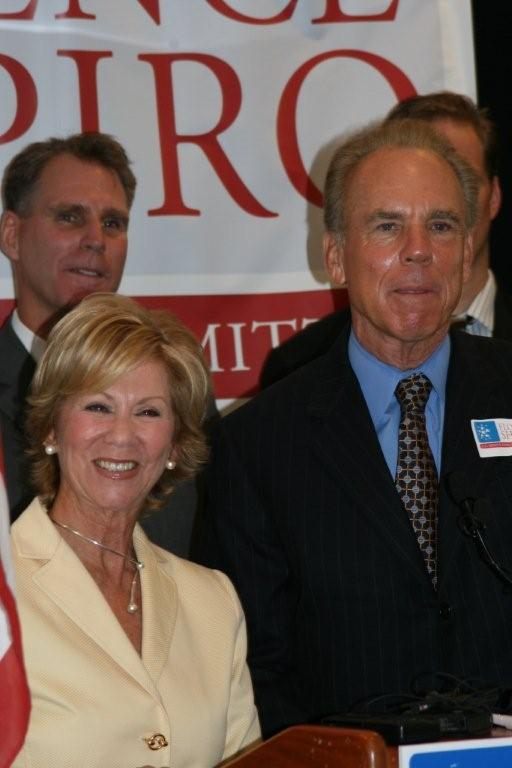
Florence Shapiro and former Dallas Cowboys quarterback Roger Staubach in 2008

==== Potential special election ====
In October 2007, Senator Kay Bailey Hutchinson announced that she would potentially vacate her seat in the U.S. Senate before the end of her term in 2012 to challenge incumbent Governor of Texas Rick Perry in the Republican primary of the 2010 Texas gubernatorial election. On July 15, 2008, Shapiro announced the formation of an exploratory committee for Hutchinson's seat, chaired by her friend and former Dallas Cowboys quarterback Roger Staubach. Shapiro was the first candidate to formally announce an exploratory committee, but local media expected additional candidates to jump into the fray, such as U.S. Congressmen Pete Sessions and Kay Granger, former Texas Secretary of State Roger Williams, and Texas Lieutenant Governor David Dewhurst.

After forming the committee, Shapiro began heavy fundraising and had raised more money than any other declared candidate by the end of 2008. Shapiro raised $226,000 in the fourth quarter of 2008 and ended the year with $373,556 in her campaign war chest.

Hutchison formally announced her gubernatorial campaign on August 17, 2009. However, Hutchison did not resign from her Senate seat, announcing on November 13, that she would remain in the Senate during the campaign.

==== 2012 election ====
Hutchinson subsequently announced on January 13, 2011, that she would not run for re-election in 2012 and would retire after 20 years in the U.S. Senate The next day, Shapiro decided against running to replace Hutchinson in the 2012 United States Senate election in Texas, ultimately won by Texas solicitor general Ted Cruz. Shapiro, who by then had raised approximately $1 million, formally withdrew her candidacy on March 31 and announced that she would refund her donors.

=== Retirement ===
On September 19, 2011, Shapiro announced that she would not stand for reelection to the Texas Senate. Her seat was ultimately won by State Representative Ken Paxton, who would later serve as the Texas Attorney General.

== Post-political career ==
After retiring from the Texas Senate, Shapiro worked for an education company. In 2013, Plano's city council chambers were renamed the Senator Florence Shapiro Council Chambers in her honor.

== Personal life ==
Shapiro lives in Plano, Texas with her husband Howard. They have three children and 12 grandchildren.

== Election history ==
=== 2010 ===
2010 Texas Senate election: Senate District 8
Party	Candidate	Votes	%	±%
Republican	Florence Shapiro (Incumbent)	136,369	100.00	+10.25
Turnout		127,590		−15.76
Republican hold				

=== 2006 ===
2006 Texas general election: Senate District 8
Republican	Florence Shapiro (Incumbent)	127,590	100.00	+10.25
Party	Candidate	Votes	%	±%
Libertarian	Ed Kless	25,935	15.98	+10.25
Turnout		162,304		−15.76
Republican hold				

=== 2002 ===
2002 Texas general election: Senate District 8
Party	Candidate	Votes	%	±%
Republican	Florence Shapiro (Incumbent)	135,927	89.75	−10.25
Libertarian	David Spaller	15,525	10.25	+10.25
Turnout		151,452		−32.80
Republican hold				

=== 2000 ===
2000 Texas general election: Senate District 8
Party	Candidate	Votes	%	±%
Republican	Florence Shapiro (Incumbent)	225,369	100.00	+10.24
Turnout		225,369		+6.48
Republican hold				

=== 1996 ===
1996 Texas general election: Senate District 8
Party	Candidate	Votes	%	±%
Republican	Florence Shapiro (Incumbent)	189,985	89.76	−0.47
Libertarian	Randal Morgan	21,674	10.24	+5.82
Turnout		211,659		+22.41
Republican hold				

=== 1994 ===
1994 Texas general election: Senate District 8
Party	Candidate	Votes	%	±%
Republican	Florence Shapiro (Incumbent)	156,014	90.23	+7.57
Libertarian	John Wawro	7,642	4.42	−12.92
Independent	Paul Bertanzetti	9,247	5.35	
Turnout		172,903		−15.52
Republican hold				

=== 1992 ===
1992 Texas general election: Senate District 2
Party	Candidate	Votes	%	±%
Republican	Florence Shapiro	129,229	53.54	
Democratic	Ted Lyon	96,746	40.08	
Libertarian	Richard C. Donaldson	15,384	6.37	
Turnout		241,358		
Republican gain from Democratic				

Republican primary runoff, 1992: Senate District 2
Candidate		Votes	%	±
✓	Florence Shapiro	17,737	48.37	
✓	Don Kent	12,742	34.74	
	Jack Harvard	6,189	16.87	
Turnout		36,668		

Political offices
Preceded by Jack Harvard	Mayor of Plano, Texas; 1990–1992	Succeeded by James N. Muns
Texas Senate
Preceded by Ted Lyon	Texas State Senator from District 2; 1993–1995	Succeeded by David Cain
Preceded by O.H. "Ike" Harris	Texas State Senator from District 8; 1995-2013	Succeeded by Ken Paxton
Preceded by Jeff Wentworth	President pro tempore of the Texas Senate; January 11, 2005 – May 30, 2005	Succeeded by Frank L. Madla
