= George Parkhouse =

American politician (1900–1967)

George Marshall Parkhouse (May 13, 1900 – August 24, 1967) was a Democratic member of both the Texas House of Representatives and the Texas Senate from District 8 Dallas County. He did this despite having lost his left arm and left leg in a childhood accident.

He served in the House from 1933 to 1935 (43rd term) and from 1943 to 1951 (48th–51st terms). He was elected to serve in the Senate in 1950 and held the position from 1951 until his death in 1967 (52nd–60th terms).

O.H. "Ike" Harris, a Republican member of the Texas House of Representatives, won a special election in 1967 to succeed Parkhouse.

Preceded by Fred R. "Red" Harris	Texas State Senator from District 11 (Dallas County); 1951–1953	Succeeded by William T. "Bill" Moore
Preceded by A. M. Aikin Jr.	Texas State Senator from District 8 (Dallas County); 1953–1967	Succeeded by O.H. "Ike" Harris
Preceded by Jep S. Fuller	Texas State Senate President Pro Tempore; 1959	Succeeded by Rudolph A. Weinert
