= 2023 Plano municipal elections =

Plano municipal election, 2023
- May 6, 2023
- Turnout: 9.14% ▼

The 2023 Plano municipal election was an election to the Plano City Council in the city of Plano, Texas on May 6, 2023. Two seats were contested for Places 3 and 5, while other two seats for Places 1 and 7 ran unopposed.

== Council seats ==
=== Place 1 ===
The incumbent, Maria Tu, ran for re-election.

Candidate	Vote number	Vote percentage
Maria Tu	11,848	100.00%

=== Place 3 ===
The incumbent, Rick Grady, was term-limited. Rick Horne and Colleen Aguilar-Epstein were the candidates.

Candidate	Vote number	Vote percentage
Rick Horne	10,188	53.81%
Colleen Aguilar-Epstein	8,747	46.19%

=== Place 5 ===
The incumbent, Shelby Williams, ran for re-election. Brett Cooper challenged him.

Candidate	Vote number	Vote percentage
Shelby Williams	10,138	53.85%
Brett Cooper	8,687	46.15%

=== Place 7 ===
The incumbent, Lily Bao, did not run for re-election.

Candidate	Vote number	Vote percentage
Julie Holmer	12,182	100.00%
