= Mayor of Plano, Texas =

Political office in the United States

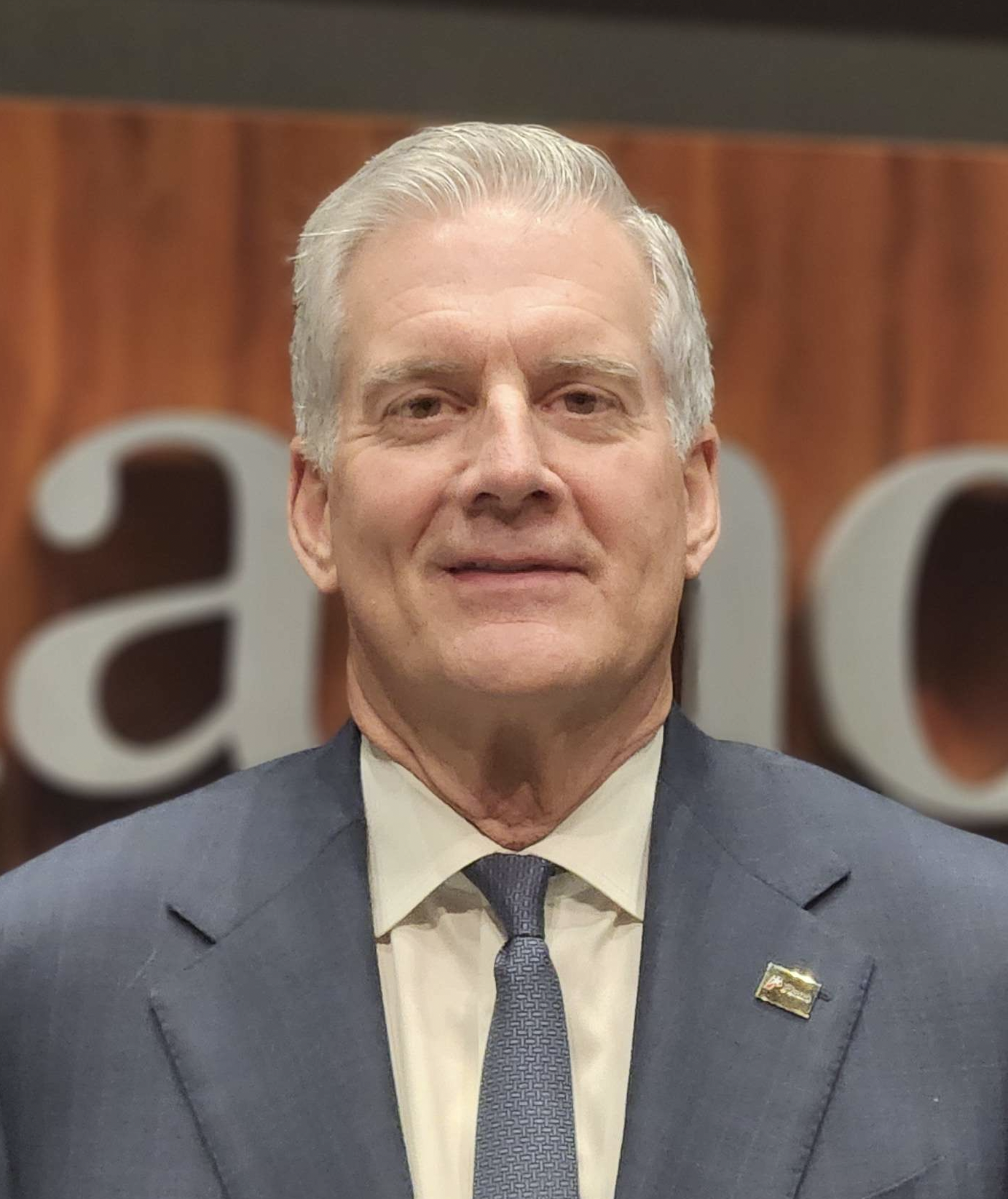
- Incumbent; John Muns since May 10, 2021
- Style: The Honorable
- Term length: Four years, renewable once
- Inaugural holder: C. J. Kellner; 1882
- Formation: Plano City Charter
- Salary: $24,000
- Website: City of Plano: Mayor John Muns

The Mayor of the City of Plano, Texas is the head of the Plano City Council. The current mayor is John B. Muns, who has served since 2021 and is the city's 39th mayor.

Serving as mayor is a part-time job, and most officeholders maintain a full-time job if they are not retired. The Mayor is responsible for setting city policy while City Manager is responsible for day-to-day city operations.

== Term of Office ==
The Mayor of Plano served one-year terms until 1884, when the term was extended to two years. In 2006, the use of three-year terms began. The term was changed to four years in 2011. As of 2023, a mayor may only serve two terms, for a total of 8 years.

== History ==
In 1881, the city's first mayor C. J. Kellner received $10 per year as compensation, partly as the "rental fee" of a barn for meetings. In 1884, the salary was approved to officially be $72 per year.

As of 2021, the mayor is paid $2,000 per month, while city council members receive $1,000.

=== Namesakes ===
Below are buildings located in Plano that are named for mayors. Namesake schools are part of the Plano Independent School District.

- A. R. Schell, Jr. Elementary School
- Conner Harrington Republican Women
- David B. McCall, Jr. Elementary School
- David B. McCall, Jr. Plaza
- Fred Schimelpfenig Middle School
- Harry Rowlinson Community Natatorium
- J. A. Harrington Elementary School
- Norman F. Whitsitt Parkway (FM 544/15th Street)
- Olney Davis Elementary School

== List of Mayors ==
#	Mayor	Term	Notes
1	C. J. Kellner	1881–1882	Resigned January 17, 1882
2	Joseph C. Hudson	1882	Appointed as Mayor Pro Tem to complete Kellner's term
3	G. F. Thomas	1882–1883	
4	W. B. Blalack	1883–1888	
5	J. C. Klepper	1888–1889	
6	W. B. Blalack	1889–1892	
7	Olney Davis	1892–1896	
8	W. B. Blalack	1896–1898	
9	W. D. McFarlin	1898–1904	
10	Fred Schimelpfenig	1904–1908	
11	J. M. Willis	1908–1912	
12	J. D. Harris	1912–1914	
13	R. H. Crawford	1914–1915	Resigned April 13, 1915
14	James Dudley Cottrell	1915–1916	Appointed April 30, 1915 to complete Crawford's term
15	J. R. Dickerson	1916–1919	Resigned May 27, 1919
16	J. A. "Fred" Harrington	1919–1920	Appointed May 27, 1919; resigned May 11, 1920
17	Joe Bradshaw	1920–1922	
18	G. E. Carpenter	1922–1924	
19	J. T. Horn	1924–1932	
20	A. R. Schell, Jr.	1932–1948	Longest-serving mayor (5,838 days); Plano Citizen of the Year, 1951
21	Odise J. Todd	1948–1950	
22	Fred H. Miers	1950–1956	
23	David B. McCall, Jr.	1956–1960	Two-time Plano Citizen of the Year (1957 and 1973)
24	Art M. Stranz	1960–1962	
25	J. Alton Allman, Jr.	1962–1964	
26	Rob L. Harrington, Jr.	1964–1968	
27	Harry G. Rowlinson	1968–1970	
28	Conner Harrington	1970	Died of natural causes on June 1, 1970; shortest-serving mayor (58 days)
29	Norman F. Whitsitt	1970–1978	Elected in a special election on July 11, 1970
30	James W. Edwards	1978–1982	
31	Jack Harvard	1982–1990	
32	Florence Shapiro	1990–1992	First female mayor, former TX State Senator, 1985 Plano Citizen of the Year
33	James N. Muns	1992–1996	1994 Plano Citizen of the Year (with wife, Betty)
34	John Longstreet	1996–2000	
35	Jeran Akers	2000–2002	
36	Pat Evans	2002–2009	2004 Plano Citizen of the Year
37	Phil Dyer	2009–2013	1998 Plano Citizen of the Year
38	Harry LaRosiliere	2013–2021	First African-American mayor
39	John Muns	2021-present	

== See also ==
- Plano City Council
- Timeline of Plano, Texas
- Mayoral elections in Plano, Texas
