= Angela Paxton =

American politician (born 1963)

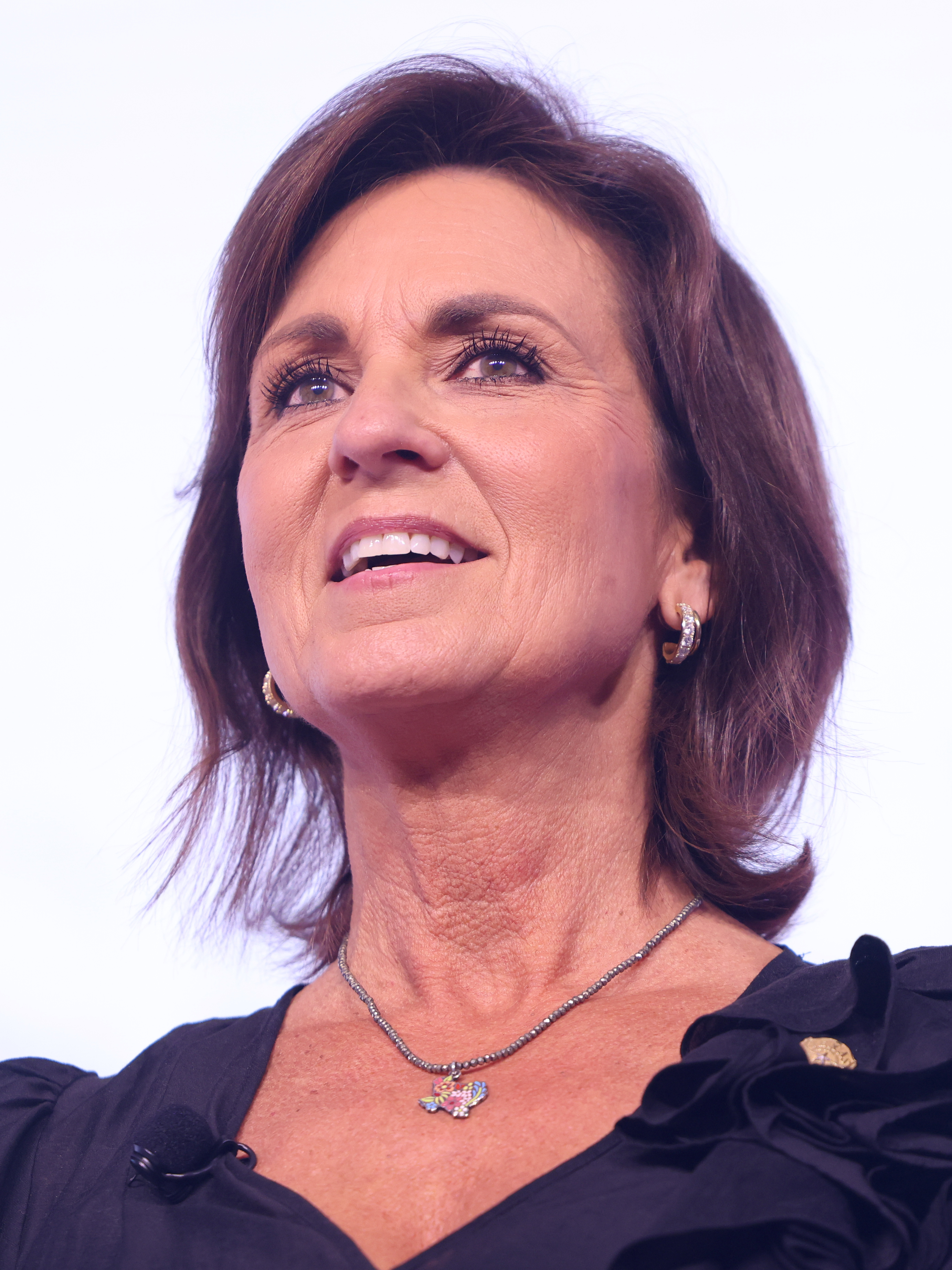
- Paxton in 2026

Majority Leader of the Texas Senate
- In office September 16, 2023 – January 14, 2025
- Preceded by: Tan Parker (acting)
- Succeeded by: Tan Parker
- In office January 25, 2023 – July 17, 2023
- Preceded by: Larry Taylor
- Succeeded by: Tan Parker (acting)

Member of the Texas Senate from the 8th district
- Incumbent
- Assumed office January 8, 2019
- Preceded by: Van Taylor

Personal details
- Born: Angela Suzanne Allen; February 14, 1963 (age 63) New Braunfels, Texas, U.S.
- Party: Republican
- Spouse: Ken Paxton (m. 1986; div. 2026)
- Children: 4
- Education: Baylor University (BS); University of Houston, Clear Lake (MEd)
- Website: Office website Campaign website

Angela Suzanne Paxton (née Allen; born February 14, 1963) is an American politician from the state of Texas. A member of the Republican Party, she has represented District 8 in the Texas Senate since 2019.

Her political career has been closely tied to her estranged husband, Ken Paxton, the current Attorney General of Texas. She filed for divorce from him on July 10, 2025, citing infidelity.

== Early life and career ==
Paxton was born on February 14, 1963, in New Braunfels, Texas. Her mother was a college student who put Angela up for adoption. She was taken in by a couple who could not have children, a fact which she later credited for her commitment to the anti-abortion movement.

She attended Baylor University in Waco, Texas, and was the first in her family to attend college. At Baylor, Angela met her future husband Ken Paxton, who was serving as the student body president. They married in 1986. She then earned her master's degree in education from the University of Houston-Clear Lake. After earning her master's degree, Paxton taught math in public schools in Collin County. She then worked as a guidance counselor at Legacy Christian Academy.

== Political career ==
When Van Taylor vacated his seat in the Texas Senate to run for Congress, Paxton joined the race for District 8 in September 2017. Paxton ran against businessman Phillip Huffines in the Republican primary. At over $10 million spent between the two campaigns, the race was the most expensive Senate primary in Texas history. Her husband's campaign guaranteed her a $2 million loan. Paxton won the primary by nine points and narrowly defeated Democratic challenger Mark Phariss in the general election.

In February 2019, Paxton introduced Senate Bill 860, which would grant her husband the power to issue exemptions from securities regulations. Billed as a consumer protection effort, the proposal would allow approved individuals to serve as investment advisers without registering with the state board. Paxton said the bill to change state securities law "has literally nothing to do" with a criminal case charging her husband Ken Paxton with defrauding investors.

Her husband was impeached by the Texas House of Representatives as the Attorney General of Texas on May 27, 2023. When Paxton declined to recuse herself from the trial, she was barred by the Texas Senate from voting on her husband's impeachment. The impeachment trial began on September 5, 2023, in the 31-member Texas Senate. Ken Paxton was acquitted of all charges on September 16, 2023. In February 2025, Paxton authored Senate Bill 13, which would move control of school library catalogs from librarians to boards of parents appointed by school board members, allowing parents to have any library book immediately removed from shelves until a decision by the school board.

== Personal life ==
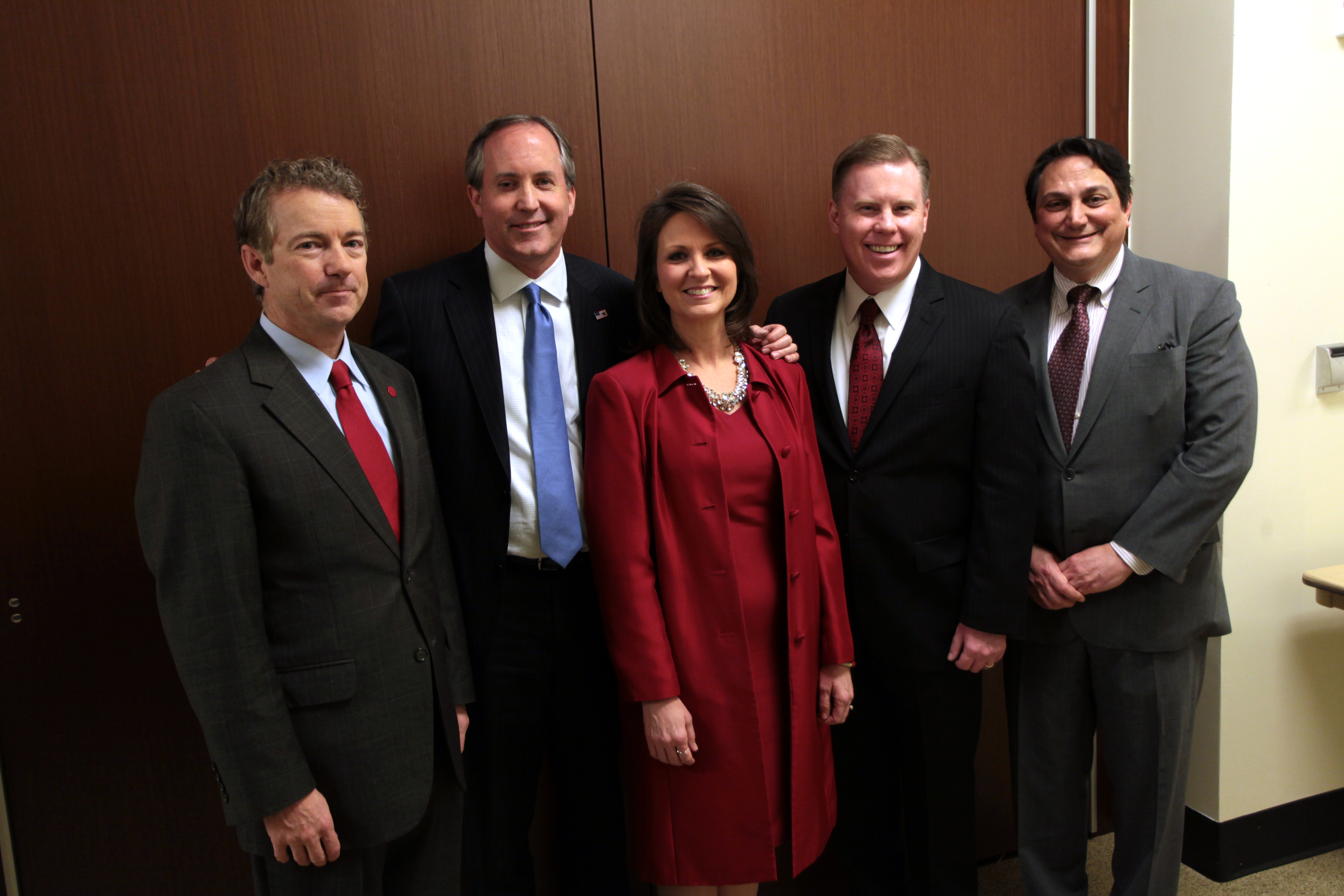
Paxton, her then husband Ken, and other Republican politicians at a Dallas County Republican Party event in 2015

Angela and Ken Paxton helped to found Stonebriar Community Church, a Christian evangelical megachurch, in Frisco, Texas, in the 1990s. The couple later joined megachurch Prestonwood Baptist Church.

In a July 10, 2025, post on Twitter, Paxton announced she had "filed for divorce on biblical grounds ... I believe marriage is a sacred covenant and I have earnestly pursued reconciliation... But in light of recent discoveries, I do not believe that it honors God or is loving to myself, my children, or Ken to remain in the marriage." The court filing alleged Ken Paxton was at fault and had committed adultery, and that the couple had not lived together since June 2024. The divorce was finalized in November 2026.

== Election history ==
Texas Senate, District 8, Republican primary, 2018
Party	Candidate	Votes	%
Republican	Angela Paxton	32,756	54.3
Republican	Phillip Huffines	27,545	45.7
Total votes		60,301	100.0

Texas Senate, District 8, general election, 2018
Party	Candidate	Votes	%
Republican	Angela Paxton	169,995	51.18
Democratic	Mark Phariss	162,157	48.82
Total votes		332,152	100.0
Republican hold			

Texas Senate, District 8, general election, 2022
Party	Candidate	Votes	%
Republican	Angela Paxton	187,754	57.69
Democratic	Jonathan Cocks	128,399	39.45
Libertarian	Edward Kless	9,293	2.86
Total votes		325,446	100.0
Republican hold			

Texas Senate, District 8, general election, 2024
Party	Candidate	Votes	%
Republican	Angela Paxton	269,743	59.36
Democratic	Rachel Mello	184,642	40.64
Total votes		454,385	100.0
Republican hold			

Texas Senate
Preceded by Larry Taylor	Majority Leader of the Texas Senate; 2023	Succeeded by Tan Parker; Acting
Preceded by Tan Parker; Acting	Majority Leader of the Texas Senate; 2023–2025	Succeeded by Tan Parker
