= Phil Dyer =

American politician and banker

38th Mayor of Plano, Texas
- In office 2009–2013
- Preceded by: Pat Evans
- Succeeded by: Harry LaRosiliere

Personal details
- Born: July 6, 1951 (age 74)
- Party: Republican
- Spouse: Margaret Hale
- Children: Phillip Graham Dyer, Jr and Adam Dyer
- Profession: President of LegacyTexas Bank

Phil Dyer (born July 6, 1951) is an American politician and banker who was 38th mayor of Plano, Texas. He was first elected in 2009.

He has a Bachelor of Arts degree from the University of Texas at Austin in 1973. He received his Masters of Business Administration from East Texas State University in 1981. Dyer served on several local boards and committees starting in 1984 and was in the Plano City Council from 1999 through 2005. He is also the president of LegacyTexas Bank.

Dyer was voted Plano Citizen of the Year in 1998 by the Plano Chamber of Commerce.
