= 2021 Plano municipal elections =

Municipal Election

Plano municipal election, 2021
- May 1, 2021 (first round), June 5, 2021 (runoff)
- Turnout: 20.20% ▲
Candidate	John Muns	Lily Bao
Popular vote	18,482	15,119
Percentage	52.86%	43.24%
- Muns: 40–50% 50–60% 60–70% 70–80% 80–90% Bao: 40–50% 50–60% Tie: 40–50%
Mayor before election
Harry LaRosiliere
Elected mayor
John Muns

The 2021 Plano municipal elections took place on May 1, 2021. In addition to the mayoral election (Place 6), seats were contested for Places 2, 4, and 8, as well as a special election for Place 7. No candidate received a majority of the total vote in Places 2 and 7, so the two top vote-earners advanced to a runoff election. This election took place on June 5, 2021. Due to term limits, incumbent mayor Harry LaRosiliere was ineligible to run for a third term.

== Council seats ==
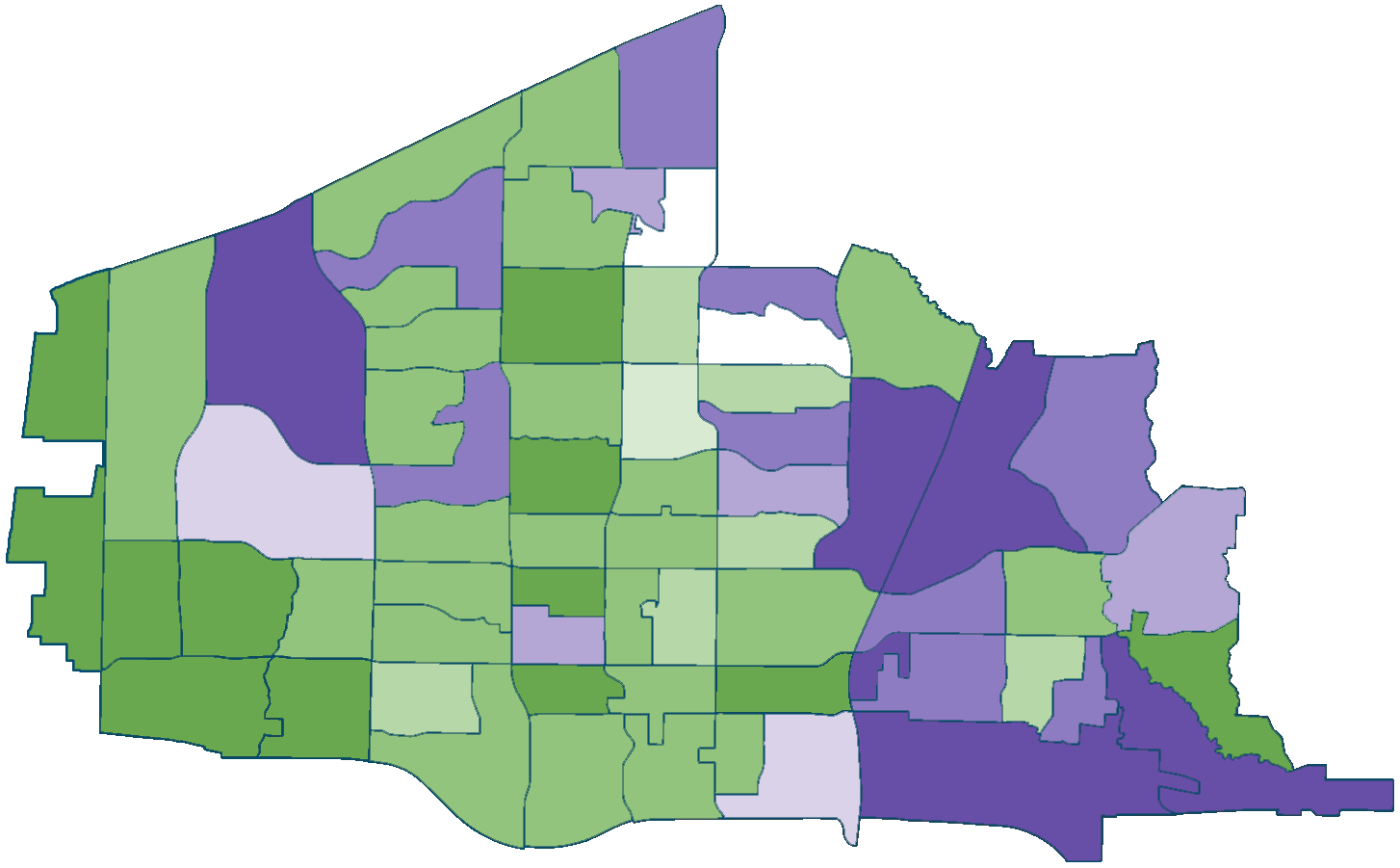
Place 2 precinct results by margin of victory: Lavine <1.00% >1.00% >5.00% >15.00% / Ricciardelli <1.00% >1.00% >5.00% >15.00%

=== Place 2 ===
The incumbent, Anthony Ricciardelli, won re-election to a second term. Steve Lavine challenged him.

Candidate	Vote number	Vote percentage
Anthony Ricciardelli	17,477	52.83%
Steve Lavine	15,606	47.17%

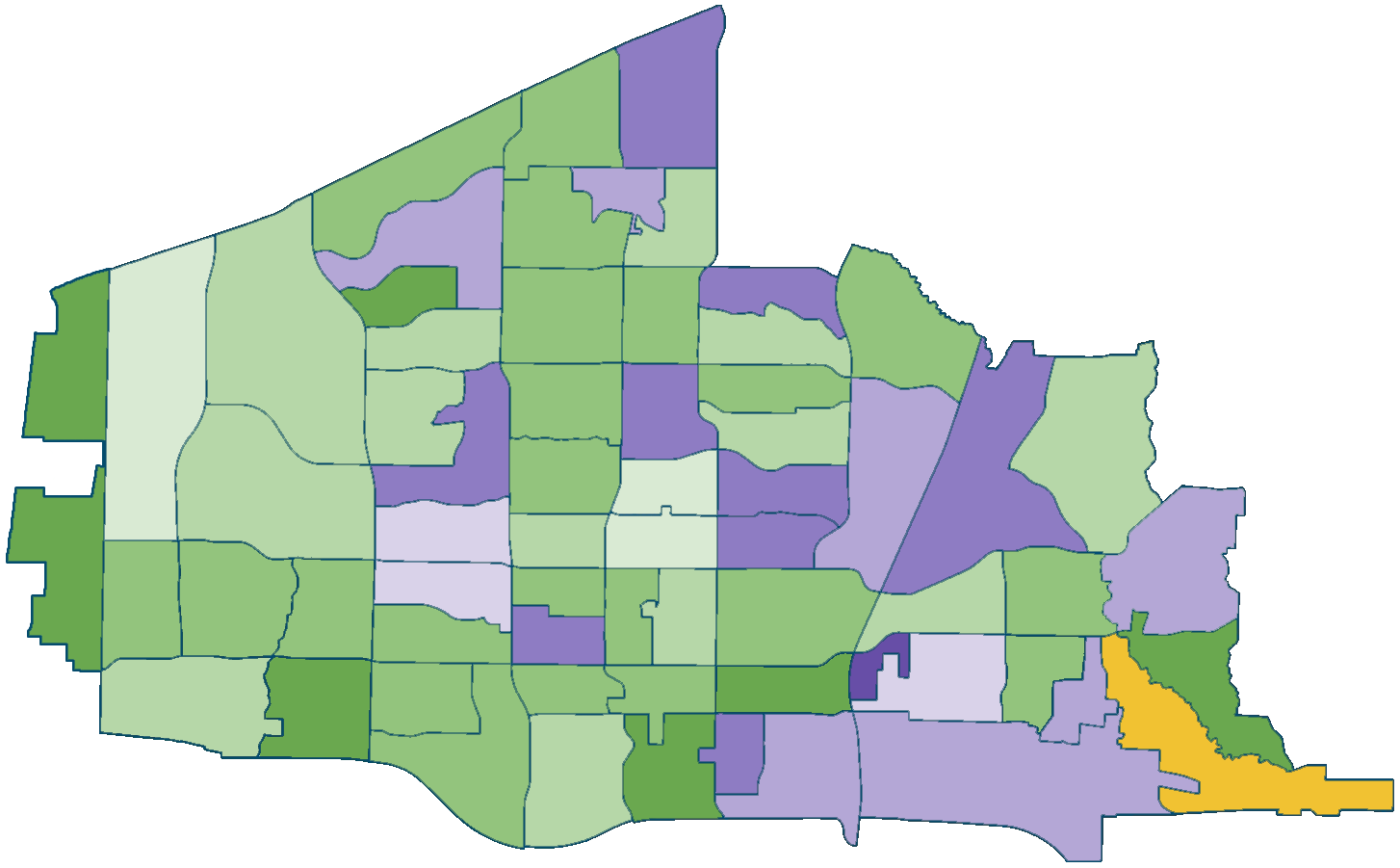
Place 4 precinct results by margin of victory: Prince <1.00% >1.00% >5.00% >15.00% / Adcock <1.00% >1.00% >5.00% >15.00% / Parveen >15.00%

=== Place 4 ===
The incumbent, Kayci Prince, ran for re-election to a second term. Justin Adcock, Nassat Parveen, and Vidal Quintanilla also contested this race.

Candidate	Vote number	Vote percentage
Justin Adcock	13,807	42.55%
Kayci Prince	12,494	38.51%
Nassat Parveen	4,594	14.16%
Vidal Quintanilla	1,513	4.78%

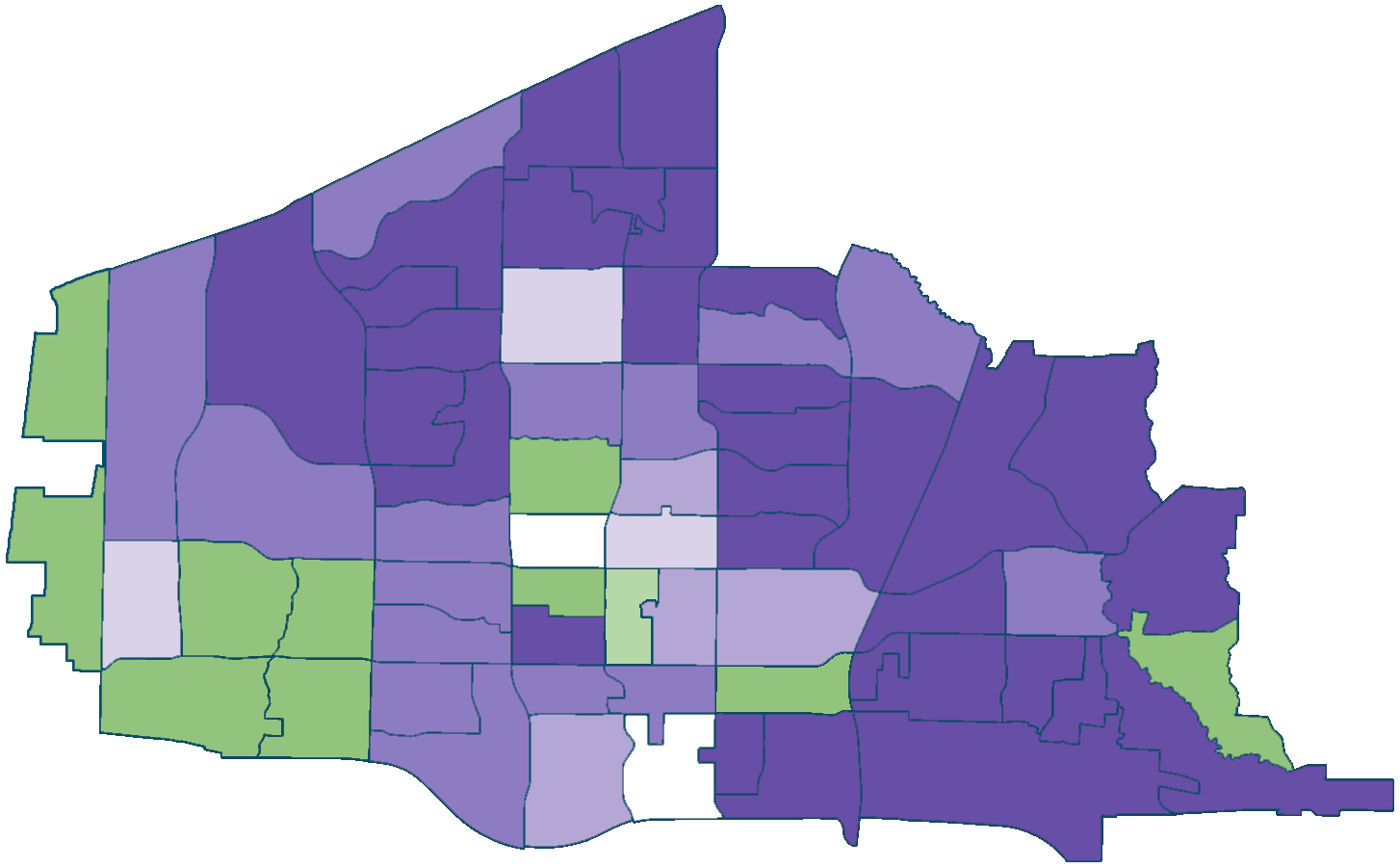
Place 4 runoff precinct results by margin of victory: Prince <1.00% >1.00% >5.00% >15.00% / Adcock >1.00% >5.00% >15.00% / Tie

=== Runoff ===
No candidate received 50% of the vote, so a runoff was held between Prince and Adcock on June 5, 2021. Prince won the runoff, retaining her seat on the council.

Candidate	Vote number	Vote percentage
Kayci Prince	12,304	55.77%
Justin Adcock	9,757	44.23%

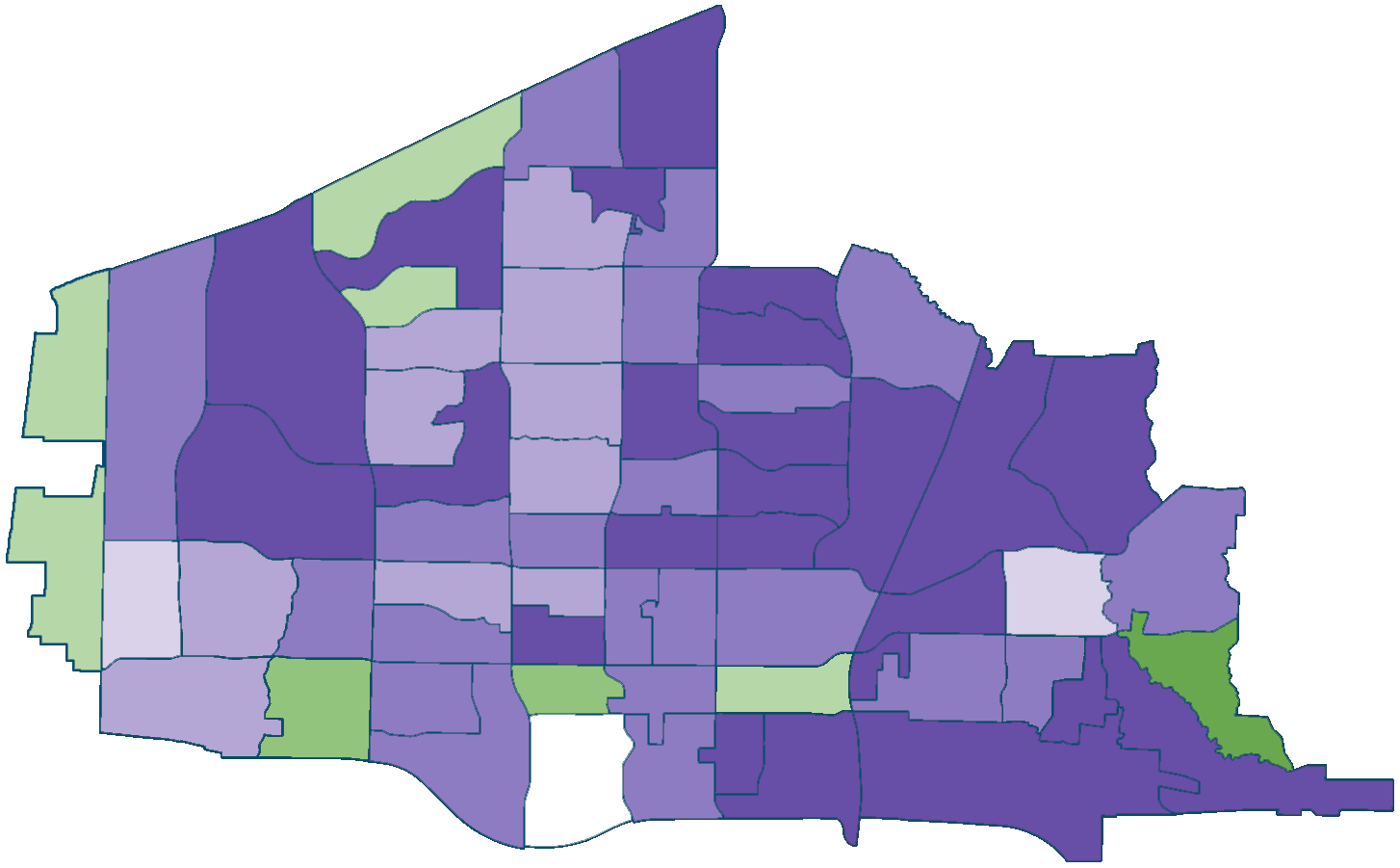
Place 6 precinct results by margin of victory: Muns <1.00% >1.00% >5.00% >15.00% / Bao >1.00% >5.00% >15.00% / Tie

=== Place 6 (Mayor) ===
The incumbent mayor, Harry LaRosiliere, was ineligible to run for a third term due to term limits. John Muns won the open seat, defeating challengers Lily Bao and Lydia Ortega.

Candidate	Vote number	Vote percentage
John Muns	18,482	52.86%
Lily Bao	15,119	43.24%
Lydia Ortega	1,362	3.90%

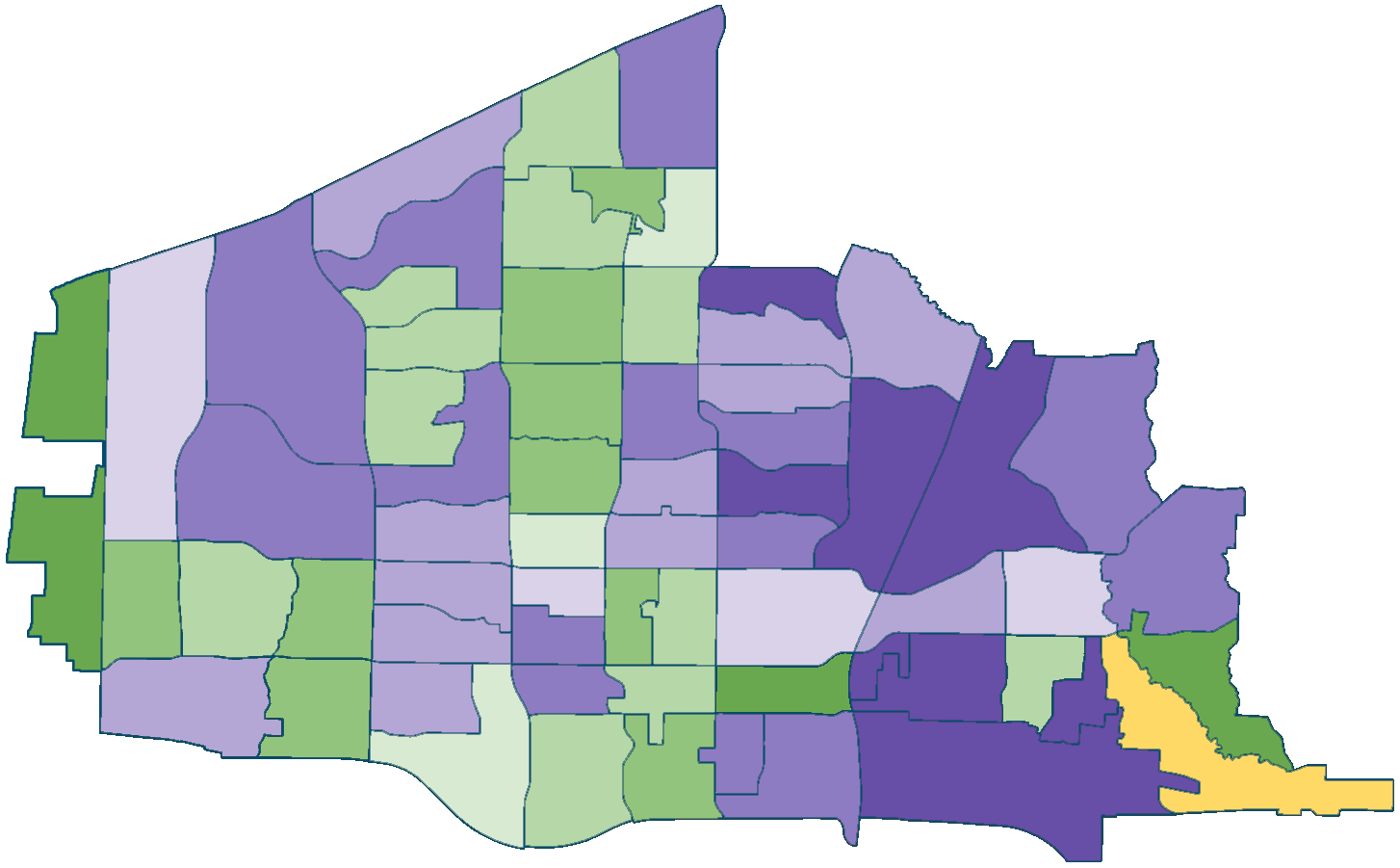
Place 7 precinct results by margin of victory: Holmer <1.00% >1.00% >5.00% >15.00% / Robertson <1.00% >1.00% >5.00% >15.00% / Smith >5.00%

=== Place 7 (special election) ===
The incumbent, Lily Bao, resigned from her seat in order to run for mayor. A special election was called to determine who will serve the remainder of her term, which expires in 2023. Bao held her seat on the council until after the certification of the election's results. Julie Holmer, Bill Lisle III, Chris Robertson, David M. Smith, and Sandeep Srivastava ran for the open seat.

Candidate	Vote number	Vote percentage
Julie Holmer	10,910	33.82%
Chris Robertson	10,516	32.60%
David M. Smith	4,595	14.24%
Sandeep Srivastava	3,779	11.72%
Bill Lisle III	2,455	7.61%

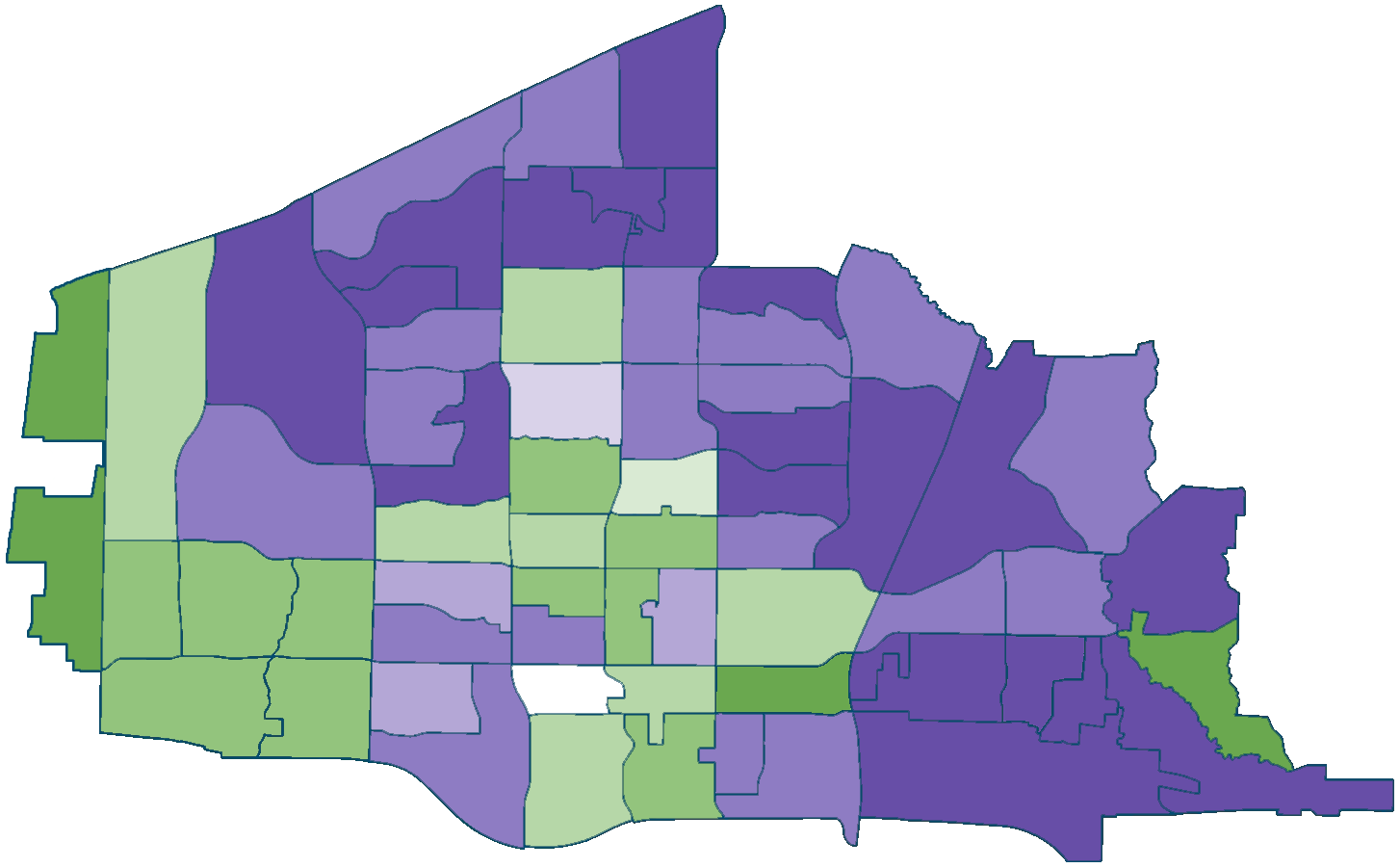
Place 7 runoff precinct results by margin of victory: Holmer >1.00% >5.00% >15.00% / Robertson <1.00% >1.00% >5.00% >15.00% / Tie

=== Runoff ===
No candidate received 50% of the vote, so a runoff was held between Holmer and Robertson on June 5, 2021. Holmer won the runoff, filling Bao's seat until her term expires in 2023.

Candidate	Vote number	Vote percentage
Julie Holmer	11,756	53.36%
Chris Robertson	10,275	46.64%

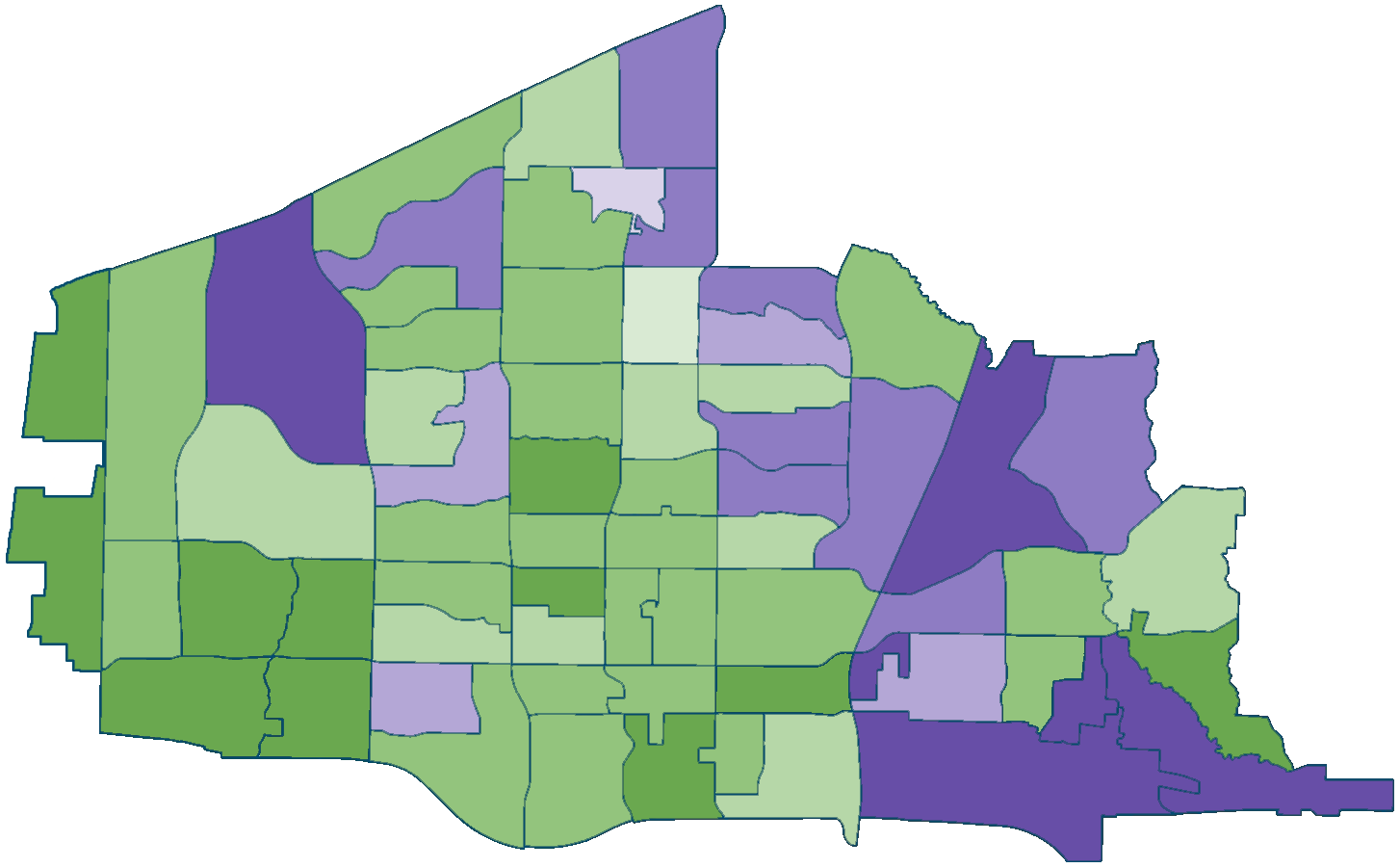
Place 8 precinct results by margin of victory: Klein <1.00% >1.00% >5.00% >15.00% / Smith <1.00% >1.00% >5.00% >15.00%

=== Place 8 ===
The incumbent, Rick Smith, won re-election to a second term. Elisa Klein challenged him.

Candidate	Vote number	Vote percentage
Rick Smith	17,084	52.95%
Elisa Klein	15,180	47.05%

== Propositions ==
=== Proposition A ===
The following question appeared on the ballot:

The issuance of $231,000,000 general obligation bonds for street improvements and the imposition of a tax sufficient to pay the principal of and interest on the bonds.

	Vote number	Vote percentage
For	25,575	76.27%
Against	7,956	23.73%

=== Proposition B ===
The following question appeared on the ballot:

The issuance of $81,935,000 general obligation bonds for park and recreational facilities and the imposition of a tax sufficient to pay the principal of and interest on the bonds.

	Vote number	Vote percentage
For	23,473	70.16%
Against	9,983	29.84%

=== Proposition C ===
The following question appeared on the ballot:

The issuance of $15,900,000 general obligation bonds for improvements to the Tom Muehlenbeck Recreation Center and the imposition of a tax sufficient to pay the principal of and interest on the bonds.

	Vote number	Vote percentage
For	18,185	55.16%
Against	14,782	44.84%

=== Proposition D ===
The following question appeared on the ballot:

The issuance of $27,140,000 general obligation bonds for public safety facilities and the imposition of a tax sufficient to pay the principal of and interest on the bonds.

	Vote number	Vote percentage
For	23,655	71.65%
Against	9,361	28.35%

=== Proposition E ===
The following question appeared on the ballot:

The issuance of $5,500,000 general obligation bonds for improvements to existing municipal facilities and the imposition of a tax sufficient to pay the principal of and interest on the bonds.

	Vote number	Vote percentage
For	19,783	60.66%
Against	12,832	39.34%

=== Proposition F ===
The following question appeared on the ballot:

The issuance of $2,490,000 general obligation bonds for the city's library facilities and the imposition of a tax sufficient to pay the principal of and interest on the bonds.

	Vote number	Vote percentage
For	23,761	72.00%
Against	9,239	28.00%
