= Pat Evans (mayor) =

American politician (born 1943)

Mayor of Plano, Texas
- In office 2002–2009
- Preceded by: Jeran Akers
- Succeeded by: Phil Dyer

Personal details
- Born: 1943 (age 82–83)
- Party: Republican
- Spouse: Chuck Evans (m. 1964)
- Education: University of Texas at Austin (BA); Southern Methodist University (JD)
- Occupation: Politician

Patricia A. Evans (born 1943) is an American politician who served as the mayor of Plano, Texas, from 2002 to 2009. She was first elected in May 2002 and was reelected to another two-year term in May 2004. On May 13, 2006, Evans clinched a third term with 57.4 percent of the vote. Her final term lasted three years. This makes her the longest-serving mayor since Jack Harvard. Although all mayors in Texas run without party identification on the ballot, Evans is a member of the Plano Republican Women's Club and the Conner Harrinton Republican Women's Club. In addition to being mayor, Evans has previously served on the Plano City Council starting with her appointment to the Plano City Council Place 3 position in 1996. She served as deputy mayor pro tem in 2000. In 2004, she was selected as Plano "Citizen of the Year". Evans also served as President of the Junior League of Collin County, TX.

Evans graduated magna cum laude with a Bachelor of Arts degree in government and history from the University of Texas at Austin. She then received a Juris Doctor from Southern Methodist University in Dallas. Previously, she had been employed as a teacher in the Richardson Independent School District and also worked in private practice as an attorney specializing in family law, zoning, and business litigation. Currently, she limits her law practice to child advocacy and is the owner of a landscaping company.

She has been married since 1964 to Chuck Evans.

Preceded by Jeran Akers	Mayor of Plano, Texas; 2002-2009	Succeeded by Phil Dyer
