= Charles R. Floyd =

American politician

Senator Charles R. Floyd, ca. 1920, from the family archive

Charles Richard Floyd (1881–1945), a Democrat, was elected to three four-year terms to the Texas Senate, serving a total of twelve years as a senator, from 1917 to 1929. In 1944, he re-entered the political landscape, elected to the office of State Representative of the 38th District, representing Lamar and Fannin counties.

Charles Richard Floyd was born April 25, 1881, in Boxelder, Red River County, Texas. The third son of Lorenzo Dow and Isabelle “Belle” Peek Floyd, his father died at the plow when Charles was only three years old. He attended Boxelder schools, Detroit Normal School, and also studied in nearby Paris, Texas. He earned a teaching certificate and taught in the English community in Red River County for four years, which greatly influenced his later efforts in the legislature on behalf of the public school system. He also attended the University of Texas at Austin.

In addition to being a state senator from 1917 to 1929 and state representative in 1945 until his death, he ran numerous businesses during his lifetime. He was owner of the Annona Cash Store; Editor of the Clarksville Times; Owner and Editor of the Annona News Weekly; and District Manager for the Dallas Morning News for Northeast Texas. He was also a member of the Annona School Board.

Floyd married Mary Etta Moore, also of Red River County, and had four children: Morris (who died at age four); William Lorenzo; Louise Floyd Meyers; and Leone Floyd Popp; and numerous grandchildren and great-grandchildren. After being elected to the Senate, Floyd moved the family to Paris, Texas. Upon his death during the legislative session of 1945, his daughter Louise ran for his seat in a special election, but was narrowly defeated at a time when there were only four women serving in the House and none in the Senate.

On February 17, 1945, after serving only six weeks in the House of Representatives, Charles Floyd suffered a stroke and heart attack during a legislative session in Austin and died in Brackenridge Hospital. He is buried in Boxelder Cemetery, Red River County, Texas.

Floyd was inducted into the Red River County Hall of Fame by the Historic Red River County Chamber of Commerce in 2006.

== Education ==
Floyd's legislative career was marked by his strong commitment to public education and moral issues and tempered by his sense of patriotism, fairness, and the importance of good organization and administration of state government. He spoke to the needs of children in Texas from the outset of his tenure with the passage of several bills promoting aid for rural schools and creating numerous independent school districts in Northeast Texas. He contributed to establishing the availability of financial aid and appropriating funds for the rural schools and was instrumental in helping raise the standard of public education in Texas. He favored rural school enactments, believing that the child in the "little red schoolhouse" should have all the advantages then afforded to the more fortunate child of the city.

== Paris Junior College ==
Senate Bill 30, one of Floyd's most important pieces of legislation in the Senate, proved to be an innovative concept in junior college funding and administration; it was authored during Floyd's last Senate session and carefully shepherded to final passage. The bill was a critical step in the development of a state policy for junior college education in Texas. He was an original founder of Paris Junior College in Paris, Texas, and actively fought for funding and continued support of the institution throughout his tenure in the legislature. With his work in support of the junior college system, his foresight and belief in the importance that an education be equitable and available to all students, and his dedication to the future of education, it was said by many that he could fairly be called the Father of Public Junior College Education in Texas.

== McDonald Observatory ==
Floyd authored and successfully passed into law Senate Bill 254 in February, 1927. This legislation relieved the University of Texas from the payment of and liability for inheritance taxes with respect to the W. J. McDonald Observatory Fund, bequeathed by the will of McDonald, another resident of Paris, Texas (Handbook of Texas). This financial step aided in the early years to provide more extensive funding for the institution, and it was the first legislation relating to the McDonald Observatory. This important legislation provided for the development of the University of Texas McDonald Observatory into a world-class facility.

== Other legislation ==
Floyd traveled to Austin from his district during the legislative sessions, a trip which his children remembered as being long and adventurous, taking four days. Many of the roads were dirt and gravel during those years. He believed that the future of Texas lay in the development of the highway system, and his efforts were unbending in that direction. He supported the construction and maintenance by the state of county farm-to-market roads. In 1926, he authored and passed eight bills creating special road districts in Texas, and was thus a pioneer in the creation of the excellent state road system.

An avid supporter of women's rights, Floyd was joint author of the law permitting women to vote in primary elections and conventions in the state of Texas. A special note should be taken of his resolutions which applauded a U.S. Senator for his advocacy of women's suffrage.

He was also joint author of the Floyd-Strickland Bill which provided improved housing rights for tenants and the Dean Prohibition Enforcement Law; he also questioned Governor James "Pa" Ferguson during the impeachment trial of 1917; and one of the first pieces of legislation he authored when he entered the Senate was a bill to erect a monument on the Capitol grounds to the Texans who fought and died in World War I, a monument which was not completed until 1961.

He also authored and jointly authored many other bills, and a full legislative history can be found at the Legislative Reference Library of Texas.

== President Pro Tem ==
One of the high points of Floyd's career was his election as President Pro Tem of the Senate on the last day of the 37th Legislative Session. It was a high honor and soundly supported by his fellow senators.

Texas Senate
Preceded by Henry L. Darwin	Texas State Senator from District 2; 1917–1925	Succeeded by James G. Strong
Preceded by William Thomas Scott	Texas State Senator from District 8; 1925–1929	Succeeded by Tom A. DeBerry
Texas House of Representatives
Preceded by Choice Moore	Member of the Texas House of Representatives from District 38 (Paris); 1945	Succeeded by Eugene Harrell
