= Fred Harris (lawyer) =

American politician, lawyer, and judge

Fred "Red" Harris

Texas Senate, District 11
- In office 14 January 1947 – 9 January 1951
- Preceded by: William Graves
- Succeeded by: George Parkhouse

Personal details
- Born: Charles Frederick Harris Jr. 28 February 1910 Oak Cliff, Texas
- Died: 20 October 1979 (aged 69) Waco, Texas
- Party: Democratic
- Education: Baylor University
- Military career
- Allegiance: USA
- Branch: United States Navy
- Service years: 1942–1945
- Rank: Lieutenant commander
- Awards: Navy Cross; Bronze Star; Purple Heart (2)

Fred "Red" Harris (28 February 1910 – 20 October 1979) was a lawyer, Texas politician and Dallas County judge. He served as an officer in the United States Navy during World War II and, in later life, became a painter of scenes from the American Western frontier.

== Early life and education ==
Harris was the son of Charles Frederick Harris and Marie Calcote Harris. He was christened Charles Frederick Jr., but his parents called him Fred and many others called him Red because of his red hair. Harris graduated from Oak Cliff High School in 1927. After high school, he attended Baylor University in Waco, Texas, on an athletic scholarship and participated on the football, basketball, track and baseball teams. Harris was recruited to play professional baseball by the St. Louis Browns and briefly played second base for their minor league franchises in Wichita Falls, Texas, and Fort Smith, Arkansas. He returned to Waco and received his bachelor of law degree in August 1932.

== Early career ==
Harris received his law license in November 1932 and began to practice law in Dallas. In 1934, he ran for a seat in the Texas House of Representatives as a Democrat and was elected after defeating the incumbent George Parkhouse in the party primary. In 1935, after the end of his first legislative session in Austin and never having liked his given name of Charles, he had his name legally changed to Fred Red Harris to differentiate himself from another prominent Dallas resident who was also named Fred Harris. Harris resigned from his seat in the House at the end of 1941 to become a Dallas County commissioner.

== Military service ==
Harris decided to join the Navy in mid-1942 and his wife was appointed to complete his term as county commissioner. He was trained and commissioned as a lieutenant junior grade in the Naval Reserve. His initial assignment was as a flight deck officer on the escort carrier USS Croatan during the final stages of her pre-commissioning and her initial voyages in the Atlantic theatre.

In late 1943, Harris was reassigned to be a flight deck officer on the carrier USS Franklin. He participated in her commissioning and throughout her wartime service in the Pacific theatre. Harris was awarded the Bronze Star and Purple Heart after Franklin was struck by a Japanese Kamikaze in October 1944. He received the Navy Cross and a second Purple Heart after Franklin was attacked by a Japanese dive bomber in March 1945.

In late 1945, Harris was promoted to lieutenant commander and released from active duty.

== Post-war career ==
Harris was elected to the Texas Senate in 1946. He ran for lieutenant governor in 1950, but lost to Ben Ramsey in the Democratic primary. After Earl Huddleston resigned from the House of Representatives in June 1951, Harris won his seat in a special election. He retired from Texas state politics in January 1953.

In 1963, Harris was appointed as a judge in Dallas County. In his spare time, he took up oil painting. His works were displayed in several one-man art shows and later published in a book. Harris and his wife moved to Waco in 1976 after his retirement.

== Personal ==
Harris married Gussie Merle Hubert on 16 October 1935. They had three daughters.
