= Texas's 8th Senate district =

American legislative district

Texas's 8th State Senate district
Senator
Angela Paxton; R–McKinney
- Demographics: 53.6% White; 12.5% Black; 16.4% Hispanic; 17% Asian
- Population: 945,219

District 8 of the Texas Senate is a senatorial district that currently serves all of Rains and Hunt counties and portions of Collin County in the U.S. state of Texas. The current senator from District 8 is Angela Paxton.

== Election history ==
Election history of District 8 from 1992.

=== 2024 ===
Texas elections, 2024: Senate District 8
Party	Candidate	Votes	%	±%
Republican	Angela Paxton	269,743	59.36	+1.67
Democratic	Rachel Mello	184,642	40.64	+1.19
Majority		85,101	18.72	+0.48
Turnout		454,385		
Republican hold		Swing		

=== 2022 ===
Texas elections, 2022: Senate District 8
Party	Candidate	Votes	%	±%
Republican	Angela Paxton	187,754	57.69	+6.51
Democratic	Jonathan Cocks	128,399	39.45	−9.37
Libertarian	Edward Kless	9,293	2.86	+2.86
Majority		59,355	18.24	+15.88
Turnout		325,446		
Republican hold				

=== 2018 ===
Texas elections, 2018: Senate District 8
Party	Candidate	Votes	%	±%
Republican	Angela Paxton	169,995	51.18	−27.89
Democratic	Mark Phariss	162,157	48.82	+48.82
Majority		7,838	2.36	−31.95
Turnout		332,152		+129.37
Republican hold				

=== 2014 ===
2014 Texas elections: Senate District 8
Party	Candidate	Votes	%	±%
Republican	Van Taylor	114,498	79.07	+16.78
Libertarian	Scott Jameson	30,312	20.93	+20.93
Majority		84,186	58.14	+30.45
Turnout		144,810		−49.39
Republican hold				

=== 2012 ===
Texas general election, 2012: Senate District 8
Party	Candidate	Votes	%	±%
Republican	Ken Paxton	178,238	62.29	−21.73
Democratic	Jack G.B. Ternan, Jr.	99,010	34.60	+34.60
Libertarian	Ed Kless	8,899	3.11	−12.86
Majority		79,228	27.69	−40.35
Turnout		286,147		+76.30
Republican hold				

=== 2010 ===
2010 Texas elections: Senate District 8
Party	Candidate	Votes	%	±%
Republican	Florence Shapiro (Incumbent)	136,369	84.02	−15.97
Libertarian	Ed Kless	25,935	15.97	+15.97
Majority		110,434	68.05	−31.95
Turnout		162,304		+27.21
Republican hold				

=== 2006 ===
Texas general election, 2006: Senate District 8
Party	Candidate	Votes	%	±%
Republican	Florence Shapiro (Incumbent)	127,590	100.00	+10.25
Majority		127,590	100.00	+20.50
Turnout		127,590		−15.76
Republican hold				

=== 2002 ===
Texas general election, 2002: Senate District 8
Party	Candidate	Votes	%	±%
Republican	Florence Shapiro (Incumbent)	135,927	89.75	−10.25
Libertarian	David Spaller	15,525	10.25	+10.25
Majority		120,402	79.50	−20.50
Turnout		151,452		−32.80
Republican hold				

=== 2000 ===
Texas general election, 2000: Senate District 8
Party	Candidate	Votes	%	±%
Republican	Florence Shapiro (Incumbent)	225,369	100.00	+10.24
Majority		225,369	100.00	+20.48
Turnout		225,369		+6.48
Republican hold				

=== 1996 ===
Texas general election, 1996: Senate District 8
Party	Candidate	Votes	%	±%
Republican	Florence Shapiro (Incumbent)	189,985	89.76	−0.47
Libertarian	Randal Morgan	21,674	10.24	+5.82
Majority		168,311	79.52	−5.36
Turnout		211,659		+22.41
Republican hold				

=== 1994 ===
Texas general election, 1994: Senate District 8
Party	Candidate	Votes	%	±%
Republican	Florence Shapiro (Incumbent)	156,014	90.23	+7.57
Libertarian	John Wawro	7,642	4.42	−12.92
Independent	Paul Bertanzetti	9,247	5.35	
Majority		146,767	84.88	+19.56
Turnout		172,903		−15.52
Republican hold				

=== 1992 ===
Texas general election, 1992: Senate District 8
Party	Candidate	Votes	%	±%
Republican	O.H. "Ike" Harris (Incumbent)	169,173	82.66	
Libertarian	Phillip J. Hubbell	35,483	17.33	
Majority		133,690	65.32	
Turnout		204,656		
Republican hold				

== District officeholders ==
Legislature	Senator, District 8	Counties in District
1	Henry J. Jewett	Brazos, Robertson.
2	Henry J. Jewett	Brazos, Robertson.
3	John H. McRae	All of Jasper, Newton, Sabine, San Augustine. Portion of Angelina.
4	Stephen Reaves	Rusk, Smith.
5	William Thomas Scott	Harrison.
6	William Thomas Scott	Harrison.
7	Louis T. Wigfall	Harrison.
8	Louis T. Wigfall; E. A. Blanch	Harrison.
9	William C. Batte	Red River, Titus.
10	Gilbert H. Wootten	Red River, Titus.
11	Samuel N. Braswell	Red River, Titus.
12	Donald Campbell	Bowie, Davis, Marion.
13	Hamilton J. Avinger	Bowie, Cass, Marion.
14	Cader A. Parker	Red River, Titus.
15	Christopher C. Francis	Anderson, Cherokee, Henderson.
16	John Young Gooch	Anderson, Cherokee, Henderson.
17	John Young Gooch	Anderson, Cherokee, Henderson.
18	Mansel Y. Randolph	Angelina, Grimes, Houston, Leon, Madison.
19	Mansel Y. Randolph	Angelina, Grimes, Houston, Leon, Madison.
20	William W. Davis	Angelina, Grimes, Houston, Leon, Madison.
21	William W. Davis	Angelina, Grimes, Houston, Leon, Madison.
22	William Page	Angelina, Grimes, Houston, Leon, Madison.
23	Thomas E. Boren	Harrison, Panola, Rusk, Shelby.
24	Thomas E. Boren	Harrison, Panola, Rusk, Shelby.
25	Thomas E. Boren	Harrison, Panola, Rusk, Shelby.
26	M. P. McGee	Harrison, Panola, Rusk, Shelby.
27	M. P. McGee	Harrison, Panola, Rusk, Shelby.
28	Charles L. Brachfield	Gregg, Harrison, Panola, Rusk, Shelby.
29	Charles L. Brachfield	Gregg, Harrison, Panola, Rusk, Shelby.
30	Charles L. Brachfield	Gregg, Harrison, Panola, Rusk, Shelby.
31	Charles L. Brachfield	Gregg, Harrison, Panola, Rusk, Shelby.
32	Edgar H. Carter	Gregg, Harrison, Panola, Rusk, Shelby.
33	Edgar H. Carter	Gregg, Harrison, Panola, Rusk, Shelby.
34	Lon A. Smith	Gregg, Harrison, Panola, Rusk, Shelby.
35	Lon A. Smith	Gregg, Harrison, Panola, Rusk, Shelby.
36	Lon A. Smith	Gregg, Harrison, Panola, Rusk, Shelby.
37	Thomas Whitfield Davidson	Gregg, Harrison, Panola, Rusk, Shelby.
38	James G. Strong	Gregg, Harrison, Panola, Rusk, Shelby.
39	Charles R. Floyd	Delta, Franklin, Hopkins, Lamar, Red River.
40	Charles R. Floyd	Delta, Franklin, Hopkins, Lamar, Red River.
41	Tom A. DeBerry	Delta, Franklin, Hopkins, Lamar, Red River.
42	Tom A. DeBerry	Delta, Franklin, Hopkins, Lamar, Red River.
43	Tom A. DeBerry	Delta, Franklin, Hopkins, Lamar, Red River.
44	Tom A. DeBerry	Delta, Franklin, Hopkins, Lamar, Red River.
45	A. M. Aikin, Jr.	Delta, Franklin, Hopkins, Lamar, Red River.
46	A. M. Aikin, Jr.	Delta, Franklin, Hopkins, Lamar, Red River.
47	A. M. Aikin, Jr.	Delta, Franklin, Hopkins, Lamar, Red River.
48	A. M. Aikin, Jr.	Delta, Franklin, Hopkins, Lamar, Red River.
49	A. M. Aikin, Jr.	Delta, Franklin, Hopkins, Lamar, Red River.
50	A. M. Aikin, Jr.	Delta, Franklin, Hopkins, Lamar, Red River.
51	A. M. Aikin, Jr.	Delta, Franklin, Hopkins, Lamar, Red River.
52	A. M. Aikin, Jr.	Delta, Franklin, Hopkins, Lamar, Red River.
53	George Parkhouse	Dallas.
54	George Parkhouse	Dallas.
55	George Parkhouse	Dallas.
56	George Parkhouse	Dallas.
57	George Parkhouse	Dallas.
58	George Parkhouse	Dallas.
59	George Parkhouse	Dallas.
60	George Parkhouse; O.H. "Ike" Harris	Portion of Dallas.
61	O.H. "Ike" Harris	Portion of Dallas.
62	O.H. "Ike" Harris	Portion of Dallas.
63	O.H. "Ike" Harris	Portion of Dallas.
64	O.H. "Ike" Harris	Portion of Dallas.
65	O.H. "Ike" Harris	Portion of Dallas.
66	O.H. "Ike" Harris	Portion of Dallas.
67	O.H. "Ike" Harris	Portion of Dallas.
68	O.H. "Ike" Harris	Portion of Dallas.
69	O.H. "Ike" Harris	Portion of Dallas.
70	O.H. "Ike" Harris	Portion of Dallas.
71	O.H. "Ike" Harris	Portion of Dallas.
72	O.H. "Ike" Harris	Portion of Dallas.
73	O.H. "Ike" Harris	Portion of Dallas.
74	Florence Shapiro	Portions of Collin, Dallas.
75	Florence Shapiro	Portions of Collin, Dallas.
76	Florence Shapiro	Portions of Collin, Dallas.
77	Florence Shapiro	Portions of Collin, Dallas.
78	Florence Shapiro	Portions of Collin, Dallas.
79	Florence Shapiro	Portions of Collin, Dallas.
80	Florence Shapiro	Portions of Collin, Dallas.
81	Florence Shapiro	Portions of Collin, Dallas.
82	Florence Shapiro	Portions of Collin, Dallas.
83	Ken Paxton	Portions of Collin, Dallas.
84	Van Taylor	Portions of Collin, Dallas.
85	Van Taylor	Portions of Collin, Dallas.
86	Angela Paxton	Portions of Collin, Dallas.
87	Angela Paxton	Portions of Collin, Dallas.
88	Angela Paxton	All of Hunt, Rains. Portion of Collin.
89	Angela Paxton	All of Hunt, Rains. Portion of Collin.
