= Texas's 2nd Senate district =

American legislative district

Texas's 2nd State Senate district
Senator
Bob Hall; R–Edgewood
- Demographics: 51.8% White; 13.1% Black; 30.5% Hispanic; 2.3% Asian; 0.4% Native American; 0.1% Other
- Population (2016): 875,650

District 2 of the Texas Senate is a senatorial district that serves all of Kaufman, Navarro, Rockwall, and Van Zandt counties, and portions of Collin, Dallas, and Ellis counties in the U.S. state of Texas. The current senator from District 2 is Bob Hall.

== Election history ==
Election history of District 2 from 1992.

=== 2022 ===
2022 General Election: Senate District 2
Party	Candidate	Votes	%	±%
Republican	Bob Hall (Incumbent)	172,713	61.90	+2.55
Democratic	Prince Giadolor	106,309	38.10	−2.55
Turnout		279,022	100	
Republican hold				

=== 2018 ===
2018 General Election: Senate District 2
Party	Candidate	Votes	%	±%
Republican	Bob Hall (Incumbent)	153,151	59.35	−24.25
Democratic	Kendall Scudder	104,897	40.65	+40.65
Turnout		258,048		
Republican hold				

Republican Primary, 2018: Senate District 2
Party	Candidate	Votes	%
Republican	Bob Hall (Incumbent)	35,530	53.23%
Republican	Cindy Burkett	31,216	46.77%

Democratic Primary, 2018: Senate District 2
Party	Candidate	Votes	%
Democratic	Kendall Scudder	20,573	100.00%

=== 2014 ===
Texas General Elections 2014: Senate District 2
Party	Candidate	Votes	%	±%
Republican	Bob Hall	99,925	83.58	−16.42
Libertarian	Don Bates	19,626	16.42	+16.42
Turnout		119,551		
Republican hold				

Republican Primary Runoff, 2014: Senate District 2
Candidate		Votes	%	±
✓	Bob Hall	18,230	50.4	
	Bob Deuell	17,930	49.6	
Majority				
Turnout		36,160		

Republican Primary, 2014: Senate District 2
Candidate		Votes	%	±
✓	Bob Deuell	23,847	48.5	
✓	Bob Hall	19,085	38.8	
	Mark Thompson	6,240	12.7	
Majority				
Turnout		49,172		

=== 2012 ===
2012 General Election: Senate District 2
Party	Candidate	Votes	%	±%
Republican	Bob Deuell (Incumbent)	172,451	100	+33.62
Turnout		172,451	100	
Republican hold				

=== 2010 ===
Texas General Election, 2010: Senate District 2
Party	Candidate	Votes	%	±%
Republican	Bob Deuell (Incumbent)	105,779	66.38	−12.30
Democratic	Kathleen Maria Shaw	53,566	33.62	+33.62
Turnout		159,345	100	
Republican hold				

Republican Primary, 2010: Senate District 2
Party	Candidate	Votes	%
Republican	Bob Deuell (Incumbent)	38,086	70.96%
Republican	Sharon Russell	15,588	29.04%

Democratic Primary, 2010: Senate District 2
Party	Candidate	Votes	%
Democratic	Kathleen Maria Shaw	9,561	100.00%

=== 2006 ===
Texas general election, 2006: Senate District 2
Party	Candidate	Votes	%	±%
Republican	Bob Deuell	92,431	78.68	+24.74
Libertarian	Dennis Kaptain	25,403	21.31	+19.82
Majority		67,388	57.36	+47.98
Turnout		117,474		−20.86
Republican hold				

Republican primary, 2006: Senate District 2
Candidate		Votes	%	±
✓	Bob Deuell	17,026	67.34	
	Tim McCallum	8,259	32.66	
Majority		8,767	34.67	
Turnout		25,285		

=== 2002 ===
Texas general election, 2002: Senate District 2
Party	Candidate	Votes	%	±%
Republican	Bob Deuell	80,075	53.94	+7.12
Democratic	David H. Cain	66,151	44.56	−8.61
Libertarian	Robert Parker	2,217	1.49	+1.49
Majority		13,924	9.38	+3.03
Turnout		148,443		−21.21
Republican gain from Democratic				

=== 2000 ===
Texas general election, 2000: Senate District 2
Party	Candidate	Votes	%	±%
Democratic	David H. Cain	100,181	53.18	+1.00
Republican	Bob Deuell	88,212	46.82	−1.00
Majority		11,969	6.35	+2.01
Turnout		188,393		+19.02
Democratic hold				

Republican primary runoff, 2000: Senate District 2
Candidate		Votes	%	±
✓	Bob Deuell	4,633	62.79	
	Richard Harvey	2,746	37.21	
Majority		1,887	25.57	
Turnout		7,379		

Republican primary, 2000: Senate District 2
Candidate		Votes	%	±
✓	Richard Harvey	10,263	37.88	
✓	Bob Deuell	9,916	36.60	
	Keith Wheeler	6,912	25.51	
Turnout		27,091		

=== 1996 ===
Texas general election, 1996: Senate District 2
Party	Candidate	Votes	%	±%
Democratic	David H. Cain	82,580	52.17	−1.58
Republican	Bob Reese	75,704	47.83	−1.58
Majority		6,876	4.34	+4.34
Turnout		158,284	29.66	+19.02
Democratic hold				

Republican primary, 1996: Senate District 2
Candidate		Votes	%	±
	Richard Harvey	9,566	41.35	
✓	Bob Reese	13,568	58.65	
Turnout		23,134		

=== 1994 ===
Texas general election, 1994: Senate District 2
Party	Candidate	Votes	%	±%
Democratic	David H. Cain	61,757	50.59	+10.51
Republican	Richard Harvey	60,317	49.41	−4.13
Majority		1,440	1.18	−12.28
Turnout		122,074		−49.42
Democratic gain from Republican				

Republican primary, 1994: Senate District 2
Candidate		Votes	%	±
✓	Richard Harvey	7,962	70.62	
	Roland Cordobes	3,312	29.37	
Turnout		11,274		

=== 1992 ===
Texas general election, 1992: Senate District 2
Party	Candidate	Votes	%	±%
Republican	Florence Shapiro	129,229	53.54	
Democratic	Ted Lyon	96,746	40.08	
Libertarian	Richard C. Donaldson	15,384	6.37	
Majority		32,482	13.46	
Turnout		241,358		
Republican gain from Democratic				

Republican primary runoff, 1992: Senate District 2
Candidate		Votes	%	±
✓	Florence Shapiro	7,793	50.59	
	Don Kent	7,609	49.40	
Majority		184	1.19	
Turnout		15,402		

Republican primary, 1992: Senate District 2
Candidate		Votes	%	±
✓	Florence Shapiro	17,737	48.37	
✓	Don Kent	12,742	34.74	
	Jack Harvard	6,189	16.87	
Turnout		36,668		

=== Federal and statewide results ===
Year	Office	Results
2018	U.S. Senate	Cruz 58.0–41.3%
2018	Governor	Abbott 62.3–36.0%
2016	President	Trump 61.1–35.5%
2014	U.S. Senate	Cornyn 67.2-29.4%
2012	President	Romney 63.3–35.5%
2012	U.S. Senate	Cruz 61.5–35.8%

== District officeholders ==
Legislature	Senator, District 2	Counties in District
1	Ballard C. Bagby	Bowie, Red River.
2	James B. Wootten	Bowie, Cass, Red River, Titus.
3	Albert Hamilton Latimer	Lamar, Red River.
4	William M. "Buckskin" Williams	Fannin, Lamar.
5	Johnson Wren	Hopkins, Lamar.
6	Johnson Wren	Hopkins, Lamar.
7	Johnson Wren	Hopkins, Lamar.
8	Lewis G. Harmon	Hopkins, Lamar.
9	Anderson F. Crawford; James W. Andres	Hardin, Jasper, Newton, Orange, Polk, Tyler.
10	Napoleon Bonaparte Charlton	Hardin, Jasper, Newton, Orange, Polk, Tyler.
11	William M. Neyland	Hardin, Jasper, Newton, Orange, Polk, Tyler.
12	Amos Clark; William H. Swift	Angelina, Nacogdoches, Sabine, San Augustine, Shelby, Trinity.
13	William H. Swift	Angelina, Nacogdoches, Sabine, San Augustine, Shelby, Trinity.
14	William H. Swift	Nacogdoches, Panola, Sabine, San Augustine, Shelby.
15	Peyton Forbes Edwards	Angelina, Houston, Nacogdoches, Sabine, San Augustine.
16	Peyton Forbes Edwards	Angelina, Houston, Nacogdoches, Sabine, San Augustine.
17	William Wallace Weatherred	Angelina, Houston, Nacogdoches, Sabine, San Augustine.
18	Frank L. Johnson	Nacogdoches, Panola, Rusk, Sabine, San Augustine, Shelby.
19	Caleb Jackson Garrison	Nacogdoches, Panola, Rusk, Sabine, San Augustine, Shelby.
20	Caleb Jackson Garrison	Nacogdoches, Panola, Rusk, Sabine, San Augustine, Shelby.
21	James M. Ingram	Nacogdoches, Panola, Rusk, Sabine, San Augustine, Shelby.
22	James M. Ingram	Nacogdoches, Panola, Rusk, Sabine, San Augustine, Shelby.
23	John Walter Cranford	Camp, Delta, Franklin, Hopkins, Red River, Titus.
24	James L. Darwin	Camp, Delta, Franklin, Hopkins, Red River, Titus.
25	James L. Darwin	Camp, Delta, Franklin, Hopkins, Red River, Titus.
26	Charles O. James	Camp, Delta, Franklin, Hopkins, Red River, Titus.
27	Charles O. James	Camp, Delta, Franklin, Hopkins, Red River, Titus.
28	James T. Patteson	Delta, Franklin, Hopkins, Red River, Titus.
29	Charles M. Chambers	Delta, Franklin, Hopkins, Red River, Titus.
30	Charles M. Chambers	Delta, Franklin, Hopkins, Red River, Titus.
31	H. Bascom Thomas; John L. Ratliff	Delta, Franklin, Hopkins, Red River, Titus.
32	John L. Ratliff	Delta, Franklin, Hopkins, Red River, Titus.
33	Henry Lewis Darwin	Delta, Franklin, Hopkins, Red River, Titus.
34	Henry Lewis Darwin	Delta, Franklin, Hopkins, Red River, Titus.
35	Charles R. Floyd	Delta, Franklin, Hopkins, Red River, Titus.
36	Charles R. Floyd	Delta, Franklin, Hopkins, Red River, Titus.
37	Charles R. Floyd	Delta, Franklin, Hopkins, Red River, Titus.
38	Charles R. Floyd	Delta, Franklin, Hopkins, Red River, Titus.
39	James G. Strong	Gregg, Harrison, Panola, Rusk, Shelby.
40	Margie E. Neal	Gregg, Harrison, Panola, Rusk, Shelby.
41	Margie E. Neal	Gregg, Harrison, Panola, Rusk, Shelby.
42	Margie E. Neal	Gregg, Harrison, Panola, Rusk, Shelby.
43	Margie E. Neal	Gregg, Harrison, Panola, Rusk, Shelby.
44	Joe L. Hill, Jr.	Gregg, Harrison, Panola, Rusk, Shelby.
45	Joe L. Hill, Jr.	Gregg, Harrison, Panola, Rusk, Shelby.
46	Joe L. Hill, Jr.	Gregg, Harrison, Panola, Rusk, Shelby.
47	Joe L. Hill, Jr.	Gregg, Harrison, Panola, Rusk, Shelby.
48	Wardlow Lane	Gregg, Harrison, Panola, Rusk, Shelby.
49	Wardlow Lane	Gregg, Harrison, Panola, Rusk, Shelby.
50	Wardlow Lane	Gregg, Harrison, Panola, Rusk, Shelby.
51	Wardlow Lane	Gregg, Harrison, Panola, Rusk, Shelby.
52	Wardlow Lane	Gregg, Harrison, Panola, Rusk, Shelby.
53	Wardlow Lane	Gregg, Harrison, Panola, Rusk, Shelby.
54	Wardlow Lane	Gregg, Harrison, Panola, Rusk, Shelby.
55	Wardlow Lane	Gregg, Harrison, Panola, Rusk, Shelby.
56	Wardlow Lane	Gregg, Harrison, Panola, Rusk, Shelby.
57	Wardlow Lane	Gregg, Harrison, Panola, Rusk, Shelby.
58	Jack Strong	Gregg, Harrison, Panola, Rusk, Shelby.
59	Jack Strong	Gregg, Harrison, Panola, Rusk, Shelby.
60	Jack Strong	Gregg, Panola, Rusk, Shelby, Smith, Upshur, Van Zandt, Wood.
61	Jack Strong	Gregg, Panola, Rusk, Shelby, Smith, Upshur, Van Zandt, Wood.
62	Lindley Beckworth	Gregg, Panola, Rusk, Shelby, Smith, Upshur, Van Zandt, Wood.
63	Peyton McKnight	Collin, Gregg, Hunt, Rains, Rockwall, Smith, Upshur, Van Zandt, Wood.
64	Peyton McKnight	Collin, Gregg, Hunt, Rains, Rockwall, Smith, Upshur, Van Zandt, Wood.
65	Peyton McKnight	Collin, Gregg, Hunt, Rains, Rockwall, Smith, Upshur, Van Zandt, Wood.
66	Peyton McKnight	Collin, Gregg, Hunt, Rains, Rockwall, Smith, Upshur, Van Zandt, Wood.
67	Peyton McKnight	Collin, Gregg, Hunt, Rains, Rockwall, Smith, Upshur, Van Zandt, Wood.
68	Ted Lyon	All of Collin, Fannin, Hunt, Kaufman, Rains, Rockwall, Smith, Van Zandt, Wood. Portion of Dallas.
69	Ted Lyon	All of Collin, Fannin, Hunt, Kaufman, Rains, Rockwall, Smith, Van Zandt, Wood. Portion of Dallas.
70	Ted Lyon	All of Collin, Fannin, Hunt, Kaufman, Rains, Rockwall, Smith, Van Zandt, Wood. Portion of Dallas.
71	Ted Lyon	All of Collin, Fannin, Hunt, Kaufman, Rains, Rockwall, Smith, Van Zandt, Wood. Portion of Dallas.
72	Ted Lyon	All of Collin, Fannin, Hunt, Kaufman, Rains, Rockwall, Smith, Van Zandt, Wood. Portion of Dallas.
73	Florence Shapiro	Collin, Fannin, Hunt, Kaufman, Rains, Rockwall, Smith, Van Zandt, Wood.
74	David H. Cain	All of Fannin, Hunt, Kaufman, Rains, Van Zandt, Wood. Portions of Dallas, Ellis, Rockwall, Smith.
75	David H. Cain	All of Fannin, Hunt, Kaufman, Rains, Van Zandt, Wood. Portions of Dallas, Ellis, Rockwall, Smith.
76	David H. Cain	All of Fannin, Hunt, Kaufman, Rains, Van Zandt, Wood. Portions of Dallas, Ellis, Rockwall, Smith.
77	David H. Cain	All of Fannin, Hunt, Kaufman, Rains, Van Zandt, Wood. Portions of Dallas, Ellis, Rockwall, Smith.
78	Robert F. Deuell	All of Delta, Fannin, Hopkins, Hunt, Kaufman, Rains, Rockwall, Van Zandt. Portions of Dallas, Smith.
79	Robert F. Deuell	All of Delta, Fannin, Hopkins, Hunt, Kaufman, Rains, Rockwall, Van Zandt. Portions of Dallas, Smith.
80	Robert F. Deuell	All of Delta, Fannin, Hopkins, Hunt, Kaufman, Rains, Rockwall, Van Zandt. Portions of Dallas, Smith.
81	Robert F. Deuell	All of Delta, Fannin, Hopkins, Hunt, Kaufman, Rains, Rockwall, Van Zandt. Portions of Dallas, Smith.
82	Robert F. Deuell	All of Delta, Fannin, Hopkins, Hunt, Kaufman, Rains, Rockwall, Van Zandt. Portions of Dallas, Smith.
83	Robert F. Deuell	All of Delta, Fannin, Hopkins, Hunt, Kaufman, Rains, Rockwall, Van Zandt. Portions of Dallas, Smith.
84	Bob Hall	Dallas (part), Delta, Fannin, Hopkins, Hunt, Kaufman, Rains, Rockwall, Van Zandt.
85	Bob Hall	Dallas (part), Delta, Fannin, Hopkins, Hunt, Kaufman, Rains, Rockwall, Van Zandt.
86	Bob Hall	Dallas (part), Delta, Fannin, Hopkins, Hunt, Kaufman, Rains, Rockwall, Van Zandt.
87	Bob Hall	Dallas (part), Delta, Fannin, Hopkins, Hunt, Kaufman, Rains, Rockwall, Van Zandt.
88	Bob Hall	Collin (part), Dallas (part), Ellis (part), Kaufman, Navarro, Rockwall, Van Zandt.
89	Bob Hall	Collin (part), Dallas (part), Ellis (part), Kaufman, Navarro, Rockwall, Van Zandt.
