= Bob Deuell =

American politician

Robert Franklin "Bob" Deuell
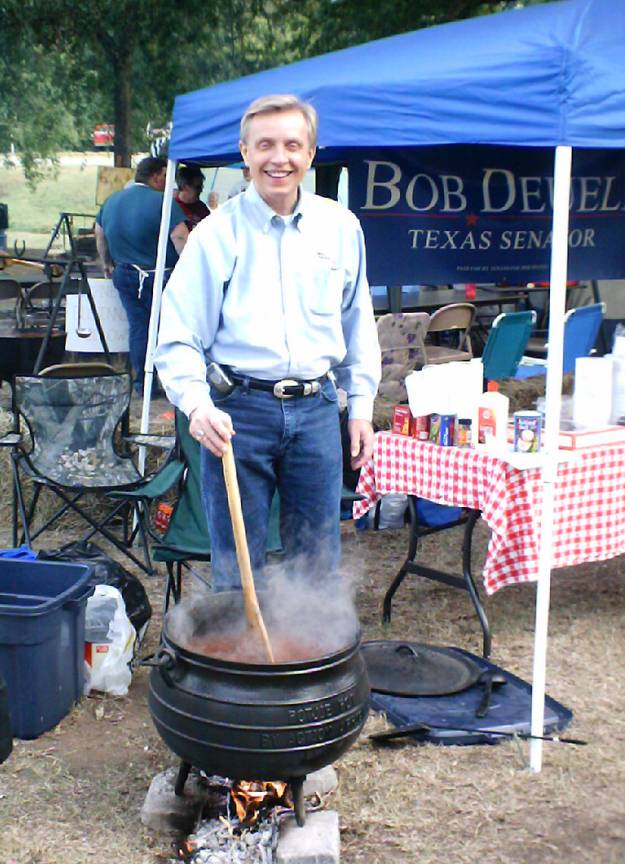
- Deuell in 2006

Member of the Texas Senate from the 2nd district
- In office January 9, 2003 – January 13, 2015
- Preceded by: David Cain
- Succeeded by: Bob Hall

Personal details
- Born: March 11, 1950 (age 76)
- Party: Republican
- Spouse: Marilyn Deuell
- Children: 3
- Education: George Mason University (BS); Virginia Commonwealth University (MD)
- Profession: Physician

Robert Franklin Deuell, known as Bob Deuell (born 11 March 1950), is a physician from Greenville, Texas, and a former Republican member of the Texas Senate. He entered office in 2003 and represented the ten counties of Senate District 2 in the northeastern portion of the state. His term ended in 2015.

Deuell was narrowly unseated in the runoff election held on May 27, 2014; he polled 17,930 (49.6 percent) to intraparty challenger Bob Hall's 18,230 (50.4 percent). Deuell had led a three-candidate field in the primary on March 4, with 23,847 votes (48.5 percent). Because he fell short of a majority, he was placed in the runoff with the number-two candidate, Bob Hall, who in the primary polled 19,085 votes (38.8 percent). The remaining 6,240 votes (12.7 percent) went to the third candidate, Mark Thompson.

== Background ==
Deuell, was educated at George Mason University in Fairfax County, Virginia, and the Medical College of Virginia. He is a partner in Primary Care Associates in Greenville, Texas. He is a member of the American Medical Association and Texas Medical Association. He is certified by the American Board of Family Medicine.

== Legislative history ==
During the Seventy-ninth Texas Legislature (2005), Deuell passed legislation to help ensure firefighters and other first responders who contract diseases in the line of duty receive the benefits they deserve (Senate Bill 310), created a statewide stroke emergency plan with the Texas Stroke Act (Senate Bill 330), authorized a medical dispatch program for rural areas (Senate Bill 523) and set up a Medicaid buy-in program for the working disabled (Senate Bill 565). Deuell also worked to ensure passage of bills dealing with issues such as education, transportation, lawsuit reform and family issues.

In the Eightieth Texas Legislature Senator Deuell was tapped by Lt. Governor David Dewhurst to carry Jessica's Law legislation, aimed at protecting society's most vulnerable population from child predators. Governor Rick Perry signed this bill into law on July 17, 2007. Deuell also worked to advance issues as diverse as Medicaid reform and incentives programs to attract film and television production to Texas. For his work in this Session, Deuell was named as one of Texas Monthly's Best Legislators.

In 2013, Deuell co-authored legislation that would require abortion providers to abide by the same regulations as ambulatory surgical centers. Critics characterized the bill as a TRAP law that would enact a "virtual ban on abortion in Texas."

Deuell and a young patient

== Leadership while in Senate ==
Deuell was the chairman of the Senate Committee on Economic Development, serving on the Senate Finance and Natural Resources committees, and was vice-chair of both the Health and Human Services and State Affairs committees.

In addition, Deuell was selected by Lieutenant Governor David Dewhurst to serve on the Senate Select Committee on Water Policy. He was a vice-chair of the Rural Caucus. Senator Deuell is a former chair of the Senate Republican Caucus.

== Electoral history ==
=== 2014 ===
Republican Primary Runoff, 2014: Senate District 2
Candidate		Votes	%	±
✓	Bob Hall	18,230	50.4	
	Bob Deuell	17,930	49.6	
Majority				
Turnout		36,160		

Republican Primary, 2014: Senate District 2
Candidate		Votes	%	±
✓	Bob Hall	19,085	38.8	
✓	Bob Deuell	23,847	48.5	
	Mark Thompson	6,240	12.7	
Majority				
Turnout		49,172		

=== 2010 ===
Texas general election, 2010: Senate District 2
Party	Candidate	Votes	%	±%
Republican	Bob Deuell	105,779	66.38	−12.30
Democratic	Kathleen Shaw	53,566	33.61	−10.95
Turnout		159,345		+35.64
Republican hold				

=== 2006 ===
Texas general election, 2006: Senate District 2
Party	Candidate	Votes	%	±%
Republican	Bob Deuell	92,431	78.68	+24.74
Libertarian	Dennis Kaptain	25,403	21.31	+19.82
Majority		67,388	57.36	+47.98
Turnout		117,474		−20.86
Republican hold				

Republican primary, 2006: Senate District 2
Candidate		Votes	%	±
✓	Bob Deuell	17,026	67.34	
	Tim McCallum	8,259	32.66	
Majority		8,767	34.67	
Turnout		25,285		

=== 2002 ===
Texas general election, 2002: Senate District 2
Party	Candidate	Votes	%	±%
Republican	Bob Deuell	80,075	53.94	+7.12
Democratic	David H. Cain	66,151	44.56	−8.61
Libertarian	Robert Parker	2,217	1.49	+1.49
Majority		13,924	9.38	+3.03
Turnout		148,443		−21.21
Republican gain from Democratic				

=== 2000 ===
Texas general election, 2000: Senate District 2
Party	Candidate	Votes	%	±%
Republican	Bob Deuell	88,212	46.82	−1.00
Democratic	David H. Cain	100,181	53.18	+1.00
Majority		11,969	6.35	+2.01
Turnout		188,393		+19.02
Democratic hold				

Republican primary runoff, 2000: Senate District 2
Candidate		Votes	%	±
✓	Bob Deuell	4,633	62.79	
	Richard Harvey	2,746	37.21	
Majority		1,887	25.57	
Turnout		7,379		

Republican primary, 2000: Senate District 2
Candidate		Votes	%	±
✓	Bob Deuell	9,916	36.60	
✓	Richard Harvey	10,263	37.88	
	Keith Wheeler	6,912	25.51	
Turnout		27,091		

Texas Senate
Preceded by David H. Cain	Texas State Senator from District 2 (Greenville); 2003-2015	Succeeded by Bob Hall
