= Harry LaRosiliere =

American politician

39th Mayor of Plano
- In office May 20, 2013 – May 10, 2021
- Preceded by: Phil Dyer
- Succeeded by: John Muns

Personal details
- Born: May 1, 1962 (age 63) Haiti
- Political party: Republican
- Spouse: Tracy Clark LaRosiliere
- Children: 2
- Education: B.S. City University of New York, City College

Harry LaRosiliere (born May 6, 1962) was the 39th mayor of Plano, Texas, the first African-American to hold the office. He was elected in 2013 and served until 2021 after reaching his term limit.

== Biography ==
LaRosiliere was born in Haiti and grew up in Harlem. In New York City, he attended Corpus Christi Catholic School and Cardinal Hayes High School and graduated from the City College of New York in 1985 with a Bachelor of Science in geology.

LaRosiliere moved to Texas in 1994 and became a financial advisor. He served two terms on the Plano City Council from 2005 to 2011, and was the planning and zoning commissioner. He was elected mayor in 2013, defeating Collin County Republican Party Chairman Fred Moses. He was reelected in 2017.

== Personal life ==
LaRosiliere is married to Tracy LaRosiliere, née Clark. They have two daughters. He is Catholic.

== Electoral history ==
Election year	Office contested	Vote number	Vote percentage	Winning candidate
2013	Mayor (Place 6)	9,872	59.0%	Harry LaRosiliere
2017	Mayor (Place 6)	13,910	52.25%	Harry LaRosiliere

== See also ==
- List of first African-American mayors
