= Plano City Council =

American City Council

Type
- Type: Council
- Term limits: No more than 2 consecutive terms

Leadership
- Mayor: John B. Muns since 2021

Structure
- Seats: 8
- Length of term: 4 years

Elections
- Voting system: Two-round
- Last election: 2021
- Next election: 2023

Meeting place
- Plano Municipal Center

Website
- www.plano.gov/180/City-Council

The Plano City Council is the governing body of the City of Plano, Texas, United States. The council operates using the council-manager government. They hold regular meetings at the Plano Municipal Center on the second and fourth Monday of every month at 7 p.m. During the month of July, the meeting dates are revised.

The Plano City Council is composed of eight members from four administrative districts. Each Councilmember serves a four-year term, extended from three years by the passing of a charter amendment in 2012. All Councilmembers, including the mayor, serve staggered four-year terms, and are limited to two consecutive terms. Plano City Council elections are held in odd-numbered years, with Places 2, 4, 6, and 8 beginning in 2013, and Places 1, 3, 5, and 7 beginning in 2015. A person who has served two consecutive terms as a city council member, is not eligible to stand for election to city council again until one year has passed. All Councilmembers are elected by popular vote of the entire city of Plano using the Two-Round system. If no candidate receives a majority of the vote in the first round, the top two candidates compete in a separate runoff election. Plano City Council races are officially nonpartisan. Those running for Places 1 through 4 must reside in the district that corresponds to that place number. Places 5 through 8 do not have residency restrictions. Place 6 is always the mayor.

== Powers ==
The powers and duties invested in the Plano City Council are governed by the Texas Constitution and the Plano Home Rule Charter. Given Plano has a population larger than 5,000, it is given home rule by the state of Texas, and is thus permitted to enact and amend its own city charter. This city charter must not contradict, and may be limited by Texas state law. Plano's was first granted home rule and enacted its charter in 1961, and continues to be governed by this charter today.

=== Compensation ===
The Plano Home Rule Charter grants city council the power to set the compensation that city councilors receive for attending their meetings. As of 2014, this compensation was $1,000 per month for city council members, and $1,400 per month for the mayor.

=== Taxation ===
The Texas constitution permits home rule cities, such as Plano, to levy, assess, and collect taxes according to their city charter. However, state law does impose limitations on what taxes may be collected, as well as how high those taxes may be. Texas allows cities, counties, transit agencies, along with other special-purpose districts to levy sales tax, but limits the total local sales tax rate at 2%. Plano is a member of the DART, which levies a 1% sales tax on its member cities, therefore Plano may only levy a sales tax of up to 1%, which it does.

== City council members ==
Leadership:

- Mayor: John B. Muns
- Mayor Pro Tem: Maria Tu
- Deputy Mayor Pro Tem: Julie Holmer

Place	Member	First elected
1	Maria Tu	2019
2	Bob Kehr	2025
3	Rick Horne	2023
4	Chris Krupa Downs	2025
5	Steve Lavine	2025
6	John B. Muns	2021
7	Julie Holmer	2021
8	Vidal Quintanilla	2025

=== Standing Boards, Commissions, and Committees ===
Each year the city council selects a certain number of citizen-applicants to serve on a board, commission or committee, as themselves or a Plano representative. An applicant must have been a resident of Plano already for at least 12 months, and they may not be chosen to serve more than two terms on a board, commission, or committee.

== Notable former Plano Councilmembers ==
- Ron Harris, four-term Collin County judge
- Jerry Hoagland, six-term Collin County commissioner
- Florence Shapiro, former president pro tempore of the Texas State Senate

== See also ==
- Mayor of Plano, Texas
