= 3rd Texas Legislature =

Texas legislative session

The 3rd Texas Legislature met from November 5, 1849 to December 3, 1850 in its regular session and two called sessions. All members of the House of Representatives and about half of the members of the Senate were elected in 1849.

== Sessions ==
- 3rd Regular session: November 5, 1849 – February 11, 1850
- 3rd First called session: August 12, 1850 – September 6, 1850
- 3rd Second called session: November 18, 1850 – December 3, 1850

== Officers ==
=== Senate ===
Lieutenant Governor
John Alexander Greer, Democrat
President pro tempore
Edward Burleson, Democrat

=== House of Representatives ===
Speaker of the House
Charles G. Keenan, Democrat

== Members ==
=== Senate ===
Members of the Texas Senate for the Third Texas Legislature:

District	Senator	Party	Took office
1	Matthias Ward	Democrat	1849
2	Albert Hamilton Latimer	Democrat	1849
3	Hart Hardin	Democrat	1849
4	Albert Gallitan Walker	Democrat	1849
4	Samuel R. Campbell	Democrat	1850
5	David Gage	Democrat	1847
6	James F. Taylor	Democrat	1849
7	Alfred M. Truitt	Democrat	1849
8	John H. McRae	Democrat	1847
9	John H. Moffitt	Democrat	1849
10	Isaac Parker	Democrat	1847
11	John B. Jones	Democrat	1849
11	Elisha Marshall Pease	Democrat	1849
12	Isaac Wright Brashear	Democrat	1846
13	Jesse Grimes	Democrat	1846
14	Jerome Bonaparte "Polly" Robertson	Democrat	1849
15	Wilds K. Cooke	Democrat	1849
16	Edward Burleson	Democrat	1846
17	David Young Portis	Democrat	1849
18	Alexander H. Phillips	Democrat	1846
19	Henry Lawrence Kinney	Democrat	1846
20	David Campbell Van Derlip	Democrat	1849
21	Henry Clay Davis	Democrat	1849
22	Benjamin Rush Wallace	Democrat	1846

=== House of Representatives ===
Members of the House of Representatives for the Third Texas Legislature:

District	Representative	Party	Term start	Term end	Counties represented
1	Burrell Perry Smith	[data missing]	November 5, 1849	November 3, 1851	Red River
2	Hardin Richard Runnels	[data missing]	November 5, 1849	November 21, 1850	Bowie, Red River
3	James S. Gillet	[data missing]	November 5, 1849	November 3, 1851	Lamar
4	Alfred Elkins Pace	[data missing]	November 5, 1849	September 7, 1850	Fannin
4	Vacant	—	September 7, 1850	November 18, 1850	Fannin
4	Harrison G. Hendricks	[data missing]	November 18, 1850	November 3, 1851	Fannin
5	William M. Williams	[data missing]	November 5, 1849	November 3, 1851	Fannin, Lamar
6	Samuel Bogart	[data missing]	November 5, 1849	November 3, 1851	Collin, Grayson
7	William M. Cochran	[data missing]	November 5, 1849	November 3, 1851	Dallas, Denton
8	Johnson Wren	[data missing]	November 5, 1849	November 3, 1851	Hopkins, Hunt
9	Joshua F. Johnson	[data missing]	November 5, 1849	November 3, 1851	Titus
10	Marion DeKalb Taylor	[data missing]	November 5, 1849	November 3, 1851	Cass
11	Jeremiah M. Clough	[data missing]	November 5, 1849	September 6, 1850	Harrison
11	Vacant	—	September 6, 1850	November 18, 1850	Harrison
11	Louis Trezevant Wigfall	[data missing]	November 18, 1850	November 3, 1851	Harrison
12	John H. McNairy	[data missing]	November 5, 1849	July 22, 1850	Harrison, Upshur
12	Vacant	—	July 22, 1850	November 18, 1850	Harrison, Upshur
12	Joseph Taylor	[data missing]	November 18, 1850	November 3, 1851	Harrison, Upshur
13	Emory Lloyd	[data missing]	November 5, 1849	November 3, 1851	Rusk
14	James K. Holland	[data missing]	November 5, 1849	November 3, 1851	Panola, Rusk
15	Elisha Everett Lott	[data missing]	November 5, 1849	November 3, 1851	Henderson, Smith
16	Benjamin F. Selman	[data missing]	November 5, 1849	November 3, 1851	Cherokee
17	William N. Hardeman	[data missing]	November 5, 1849	November 3, 1851	Nacogdoches
18	William G. W. Jowers	[data missing]	November 5, 1849	November 3, 1851	Anderson, Houston
19	Nicholas Adolphus Sterne	[data missing]	November 5, 1849	November 3, 1851	Anderson, Angelina, Cherokee, Houston, Nacogdoches
20	John Polk Jr.	[data missing]	November 5, 1849	November 3, 1851	San Augustine
21	Josiah M. Smith	[data missing]	November 5, 1849	November 3, 1851	Shelby
22	Edgar A. Whittlesey	[data missing]	November 5, 1849	July 14, 1850	Newton, Sabine
22	Vacant	—	July 14, 1850	August 16, 1850	Newton, Sabine
22	Joshua H. Speights	[data missing]	August 16, 1850	November 3, 1851	Newton, Sabine
23	Napoleon Bonaparte Charlton	[data missing]	November 5, 1849	November 3, 1851	Jasper, Jefferson, Tyler
24	William Fields	[data missing]	November 5, 1849	November 3, 1851	Liberty, Polk
25	Benjamin Cromwell Franklin	[data missing]	November 5, 1849	November 3, 1851	Galveston
25	Thomas Freeman McKinney	[data missing]	November 21, 1849	November 3, 1851	Galveston
26	J. M. Reynolds	[data missing]	November 5, 1849	November 3, 1851	Harris
26	John Shea	[data missing]	November 5, 1849	November 3, 1851	Harris
26	James W. Scott	[data missing]	November 5, 1849	November 3, 1851	Harris
27	Guy Morrison Bryan	[data missing]	November 5, 1849	November 3, 1851	Brazoria, Fort Bend
28	David Catchings Dickson	[data missing]	November 5, 1849	November 3, 1851	Grimes, Montgomery
29	Charles Gradison Keenan	[data missing]	November 5, 1849	November 3, 1851	Walker
'30	Elliott M. Millican	[data missing]	November 5, 1849	July 15, 1850	Brazos, Leon, Robertson
'30	Vacant	—	July 15, 1850	November 18, 1850	Brazos, Leon, Robertson
'30	John Patrick	[data missing]	November 18, 1850	November 3, 1851	Brazos, Leon, Robertson
31	Edward H. Tarrant	[data missing]	November 5, 1849	November 3, 1851	Limestone, Navarro
32	James Charles Wilson	[data missing]	November 5, 1849	October 15, 1850	Calhoun, Jackson, Matagorda, Wharton
32	Vacant	—	October 15, 1850	November 18, 1850	Calhoun, Jackson, Matagorda, Wharton
32	Clark L. Owen	[data missing]	November 18, 1850	November 3, 1851	Calhoun, Jackson, Matagorda, Wharton
33	William Edmund Crump	[data missing]	November 5, 1849	October 13, 1850	Austin, Colorado
33	Vacant	—	October 13, 1850	November 18, 1850	Austin, Colorado
33	Zimri Hunt	[data missing]	November 18, 1850	November 3, 1851	Austin, Colorado
34	William J. Russell	[data missing]	November 5, 1849	November 3, 1851	Fayette
35	Benjamin E. Tarver	[data missing]	November 5, 1849	July 21, 1850	Washington
35	Vacant	—	July 21, 1850	August 12, 1850	Washington
35	James E. Shepard	[data missing]	August 12, 1850	November 3, 1851	Washington
35	James G. Sheppard	[data missing]	August 12, 1850	November 3, 1851	Washington
36	James Shaw	[data missing]	November 5, 1849	November 3, 1851	Bastrop, Burleson
37	George E. Burney	[data missing]	November 5, 1849	November 3, 1851	Milam, Williamson
38	Thomas M. Hardeman	[data missing]	November 5, 1849	November 3, 1851	Caldwell, Hays, Travis
39	Darwin M. Stapp	[data missing]	November 5, 1849	November 3, 1851	DeWitt, Lavaca, Victoria
40	William H. Stewart	[data missing]	November 5, 1849	November 3, 1851	Comal, Gonzales, Guadalupe
41	William G. Crump	[data missing]	November 5, 1849	November 3, 1851	Bexar
41	Henry M. Lewis	[data missing]	November 5, 1849	November 3, 1851	Bexar
42	Reuben E. Clements	[data missing]	November 5, 1849	November 3, 1851	Cameron, Nueces, Starr, Webb
43	Hamilton Prioleau Bee	[data missing]	November 5, 1849	November 3, 1851	Cameron, Goliad, Nueces, Refugio, San Patricio, Starr, Webb
44	Edward H. Winfield	[data missing]	November 5, 1849	November 3, 1851	Cameron, Starr, Webb

== Membership Changes ==
=== Senate ===
District	Outgoing Senator	Reason for Vacancy	Successor	Date of Successor's Installation
District 4	Albert G. Walker	Senator Walker resigned March 30, 1850	Samuel R. Campbell	August 12, 1850
District 6	James F. Taylor	Senator Taylor resigned October 5, 1850.	James F. Taylor	November 18, 1850
District 11	John B. Jones	In an election contest, Elisha M. Pease unseated Senator Jones on November 9, 1849.	Elisha M. Pease	November 9, 1849

- Campbell was elected in a special election on July 22, 1850.
- After his resignation, Taylor was reelected in a special election.
