= List of governors of Texas =

The governor of Texas is the chief executive officer of the U.S. state of Texas and the commander in chief of the state's military forces. The incumbent governor is Greg Abbott, who assumed office on January 20, 2015. Since Texas' statehood in 1845, 45 individuals have served in 48 governorships. The discrepancy is due to the nonconsecutive terms of Elisha M. Pease, Miriam A. Ferguson, and Bill Clements.

When compared to those of other states, the governorship of Texas has been described as one of relative weakness. In some respects, it is the lieutenant governor of Texas, who presides over the Texas Senate, who possesses greater influence to exercise their prerogatives.

== Governors ==
Texas was annexed by the United States and admitted to the Union on December 29, 1845.

The governor is inaugurated on the third Tuesday of January every four years along with the lieutenant governor, and serves a term of four years. Prior to the present laws, in 1845, the state's first constitution established the office of governor, serving a term of two years, but no more than four years of every six. The 1861 constitution, following secession from the Union, established the first Monday of November following election as the term's start. Following the end of the American Civil War, the 1866 constitution increased term length to four years, limiting overall service to no more than eight years of every twelve, moving the term's start to the first Thursday following organization of the legislature, or "as soon thereafter as practicable." The constitution of 1869, enacted during Reconstruction, removed term limitations. The present constitution of 1876 returned terms to two years, but a 1972 amendment again returned them to four.

In the case of a vacancy in the office, the lieutenant governor becomes governor. Prior to a 1999 amendment, the lieutenant governor only acted as governor until the expiration of the term to which he succeeded. (Note: Under the 1861 constitution, law provided that the lieutenant governor would be "styled Governor of those state of Republicans" in case of vacancy.) The governor and the lieutenant governor are not officially elected on the same ticket.

Governors of the State of Texas
No.	Governor	Term in office	Party	Election	Lt. Governor (Note: Lieutenant governors represented the same party as their governor unless noted.)
1	J. Pinckney Henderson (1808–1858)	February 19, 1846 – December 21, 1847 (671 days; retired)	Democratic	1845	Albert Clinton Horton (Note: Horton acted as governor from May 19 to November 15, 1846, while Henderson was out of state commanding troops in Mexico.)
2	George Tyler Wood (1795–1858)	December 21, 1847 – December 21, 1849 (732 days; lost election)	Democratic	1847	John Alexander Greer
3	Peter Hansborough Bell (1810–1898)	December 21, 1849 – November 23, 1853 (1434 days; resigned) (Note: Bell resigned, having been elected to the United States House of Representatives.)	Democratic	1849	John Alexander Greer
3	Peter Hansborough Bell (1810–1898)	December 21, 1849 – November 23, 1853 (1434 days; resigned)	Democratic	1851	James W. Henderson
4	James W. Henderson (1817–1880)	November 23, 1853 – December 21, 1853 (29 days; retired)	Democratic	Succeeded from lieutenant governor	Vacant
5	Elisha M. Pease (1812–1883)	December 21, 1853 – December 21, 1857 (1462 days; term-limited) (Note: Under the 1845 constitution, governors were ineligible to serve more than four years in any term of six years.)	Democratic	1853	David Catchings Dickson
5	Elisha M. Pease (1812–1883)	December 21, 1853 – December 21, 1857 (1462 days; term-limited)	Democratic	1855	Hardin Richard Runnels
6	Hardin Richard Runnels (1820–1873)	December 21, 1857 – December 21, 1859 (731 days; lost election)	Democratic	1857	Francis Lubbock
7	Sam Houston (1793–1863)	December 21, 1859 – March 16, 1861 (452 days; removed) (Note: Houston refused to take the oath of allegiance to the Confederate States of America, so the secession convention declared the office vacant.)	Independent	1859	Edward Clark
8	Edward Clark (1815–1880)	March 16, 1861 – November 7, 1861 (237 days; lost election)	Democratic	Succeeded from lieutenant governor	Vacant
9	Francis Lubbock (1815–1905)	November 7, 1861 – November 5, 1863 (729 days; retired)	Democratic	1861	John McClannahan Crockett
10	Pendleton Murrah (d. 1865)	November 5, 1863 – June 17, 1865 (591 days; office vacated) (Note: Murrah fled for Mexico around June 11, during the collapse of the Confederacy, dying there two months later. Some sources list Lieutenant Governor Fletcher Stockdale as succeeding him and serving from June 11, to either June 16, when Andrew Jackson Hamilton was appointed military governor, or July 25, when Hamilton arrived in Austin. However, some historians disagree on if the office formally transferred to Stockdale, and he is noted in the 2004-2005 Texas Almanac as only "having performed some duties of office.")	Democratic	1863	Fletcher Stockdale
11	Andrew Jackson Hamilton (1815–1875)	June 17, 1865 – August 9, 1866 (419 days; retired)	Military governor appointed by President		Vacant
12	James W. Throckmorton (1825–1894)	August 9, 1866 – July 30, 1867 (356 days; removed) (Note: Throckmorton was removed from office by General Charles Griffin for being an "impediment to reconstruction," and Pease was installed in his place.)	Democratic	1866	George Washington Jones
13	Elisha M. Pease (1812–1883)	July 30, 1867 – September 30, 1869 (794 days; resigned) (Note: Pease resigned due to disagreements with General Joseph J. Reynolds.)	Installed by military occupation		Vacant
—	Vacant	September 30, 1869 – January 8, 1870 (101 days)	Office vacated after resignation		Vacant
14	Edmund J. Davis (1827–1883)	January 8, 1870 – January 15, 1874 (1469 days; lost election)	Republican	1869	Vacant
15	Richard Coke (1829–1897)	January 15, 1874 – December 1, 1876 (1052 days; resigned) (Note: Coke resigned, having been elected to the United States Senate.)	Democratic	1873	Richard B. Hubbard
15	Richard Coke (1829–1897)	January 15, 1874 – December 1, 1876 (1052 days; resigned)	Democratic	1876	Richard B. Hubbard
16	Richard B. Hubbard (1832–1901)	December 1, 1876 – January 21, 1879 (782 days; retired)	Democratic	Succeeded from lieutenant governor	Vacant
17	Oran Milo Roberts (1815–1898)	January 21, 1879 – January 16, 1883 (1457 days; retired)	Democratic	1878	Joseph D. Sayers
17	Oran Milo Roberts (1815–1898)	January 21, 1879 – January 16, 1883 (1457 days; retired)	Democratic	1880	Leonidas Jefferson Storey
18	John Ireland (1827–1896)	January 16, 1883 – January 18, 1887 (1464 days; retired)	Democratic	1882	Francis Marion Martin
18	John Ireland (1827–1896)	January 16, 1883 – January 18, 1887 (1464 days; retired)	Democratic	1884	Barnett Gibbs
19	Lawrence Sullivan Ross (1838–1898)	January 18, 1887 – January 20, 1891 (1464 days; retired)	Democratic	1886	Thomas Benton Wheeler
19	Lawrence Sullivan Ross (1838–1898)	January 18, 1887 – January 20, 1891 (1464 days; retired)	Democratic	1888	Thomas Benton Wheeler
20	Jim Hogg (1851–1906)	January 20, 1891 – January 15, 1895 (1457 days; retired)	Democratic	1890	George C. Pendleton
20	Jim Hogg (1851–1906)	January 20, 1891 – January 15, 1895 (1457 days; retired)	Democratic	1892	Martin McNulty Crane
21	Charles A. Culberson (1855–1925)	January 15, 1895 – January 17, 1899 (1464 days; retired) (Note: Culberson was instead elected to the United States Senate.)	Democratic	1894	George Taylor Jester
21	Charles A. Culberson (1855–1925)	January 15, 1895 – January 17, 1899 (1464 days; retired)	Democratic	1896	George Taylor Jester
22	Joseph D. Sayers (1841–1929)	January 17, 1899 – January 20, 1903 (1464 days; retired)	Democratic	1898	James Browning
22	Joseph D. Sayers (1841–1929)	January 17, 1899 – January 20, 1903 (1464 days; retired)	Democratic	1900	James Browning
23	S. W. T. Lanham (1846–1908)	January 20, 1903 – January 15, 1907 (1457 days; retired)	Democratic	1902	George D. Neal
23	S. W. T. Lanham (1846–1908)	January 20, 1903 – January 15, 1907 (1457 days; retired)	Democratic	1904	George D. Neal
24	Thomas Mitchell Campbell (1856–1923)	January 15, 1907 – January 17, 1911 (1464 days; retired)	Democratic	1906	Asbury Bascom Davidson
24	Thomas Mitchell Campbell (1856–1923)	January 15, 1907 – January 17, 1911 (1464 days; retired)	Democratic	1908	Asbury Bascom Davidson
25	Oscar Branch Colquitt (1861–1940)	January 17, 1911 – January 19, 1915 (1464 days; retired)	Democratic	1910	Asbury Bascom Davidson
25	Oscar Branch Colquitt (1861–1940)	January 17, 1911 – January 19, 1915 (1464 days; retired)	Democratic	1912	William Harding Mayes
26	James E. Ferguson (1871–1944)	January 19, 1915 – September 22, 1917 (978 days; impeached and removed) (Note: Ferguson was impeached and convicted for mismanagement of funds. Modern sources say he resigned before the trial was complete, but contemporary news shows he still maintained his office and refused to resign.)	Democratic	1914	William P. Hobby
26	James E. Ferguson (1871–1944)	January 19, 1915 – September 22, 1917 (978 days; impeached and removed)	Democratic	1916	William P. Hobby
27	William P. Hobby (1878–1964)	September 22, 1917 (Note: Hobby became acting governor upon Ferguson's impeachment on August 24; Ferguson was convicted and removed on September 22.) – January 18, 1921 (1215 days; retired)	Democratic	Succeeded from lieutenant governor	Vacant
27	William P. Hobby (1878–1964)	September 22, 1917 – January 18, 1921 (1215 days; retired)	Democratic	1918	Willard Arnold Johnson
28	Pat Morris Neff (1871–1952)	January 18, 1921 – January 20, 1925 (1464 days; retired)	Democratic	1920	Lynch Davidson
28	Pat Morris Neff (1871–1952)	January 18, 1921 – January 20, 1925 (1464 days; retired)	Democratic	1922	Thomas Whitfield Davidson
29	Miriam A. Ferguson (1875–1961)	January 20, 1925 – January 18, 1927 (729 days; lost nomination)	Democratic	1924	Barry Miller
30	Dan Moody (1893–1966)	January 18, 1927 – January 20, 1931 (1464 days; retired)	Democratic	1926	Barry Miller
30	Dan Moody (1893–1966)	January 18, 1927 – January 20, 1931 (1464 days; retired)	Democratic	1928	Barry Miller
31	Ross S. Sterling (1875–1949)	January 20, 1931 – January 17, 1933 (729 days; lost nomination)	Democratic	1930	Edgar E. Witt
32	Miriam A. Ferguson (1875–1961)	January 17, 1933 – January 15, 1935 (729 days; retired)	Democratic	1932	Edgar E. Witt
33	James V. Allred (1899–1959)	January 15, 1935 – January 17, 1939 (1464 days; retired)	Democratic	1934	Walter Frank Woodul
33	James V. Allred (1899–1959)	January 15, 1935 – January 17, 1939 (1464 days; retired)	Democratic	1936	Walter Frank Woodul
34	W. Lee O'Daniel (1890–1969)	January 17, 1939 – August 4, 1941 (931 days; resigned) (Note: O'Daniel resigned, having been elected to the United States Senate.)	Democratic	1938	Coke R. Stevenson
34	W. Lee O'Daniel (1890–1969)	January 17, 1939 – August 4, 1941 (931 days; resigned)	Democratic	1940	Coke R. Stevenson
35	Coke R. Stevenson (1888–1975)	August 4, 1941 – January 21, 1947 (1997 days; retired)	Democratic	Succeeded from lieutenant governor	Vacant
35	Coke R. Stevenson (1888–1975)	August 4, 1941 – January 21, 1947 (1997 days; retired)	Democratic	1942	John Lee Smith
35	Coke R. Stevenson (1888–1975)	August 4, 1941 – January 21, 1947 (1997 days; retired)	Democratic	1944	John Lee Smith
36	Beauford H. Jester (1893–1949)	January 21, 1947 – July 11, 1949 (903 days; died in office)	Democratic	1946	Allan Shivers
36	Beauford H. Jester (1893–1949)	January 21, 1947 – July 11, 1949 (903 days; died in office)	Democratic	1948	Allan Shivers
37	Allan Shivers (1907–1985)	July 11, 1949 – January 15, 1957 (2746 days; retired)	Democratic	Succeeded from lieutenant governor	Vacant
37	Allan Shivers (1907–1985)	July 11, 1949 – January 15, 1957 (2746 days; retired)	Democratic	1950	Ben Ramsey
37	Allan Shivers (1907–1985)	July 11, 1949 – January 15, 1957 (2746 days; retired)	Democratic	1952	Ben Ramsey
37	Allan Shivers (1907–1985)	July 11, 1949 – January 15, 1957 (2746 days; retired)	Democratic	1954	Ben Ramsey
38	Price Daniel (1910–1988)	January 15, 1957 – January 15, 1963 (2192 days; lost nomination)	Democratic	1956	Ben Ramsey
38	Price Daniel (1910–1988)	January 15, 1957 – January 15, 1963 (2192 days; lost nomination)	Democratic	1958	Ben Ramsey
38	Price Daniel (1910–1988)	January 15, 1957 – January 15, 1963 (2192 days; lost nomination)	Democratic	1960	Ben Ramsey
38	Price Daniel (1910–1988)	January 15, 1957 – January 15, 1963 (2192 days; lost nomination)	Democratic	1960	Vacant
39	John Connally (1917–1993)	January 15, 1963 – January 21, 1969 (2199 days; retired)	Democratic	1962	Preston Smith
39	John Connally (1917–1993)	January 15, 1963 – January 21, 1969 (2199 days; retired)	Democratic	1964	Preston Smith
39	John Connally (1917–1993)	January 15, 1963 – January 21, 1969 (2199 days; retired)	Democratic	1966	Preston Smith
40	Preston Smith (1912–2003)	January 21, 1969 – January 16, 1973 (1457 days; lost nomination)	Democratic	1968	Ben Barnes
40	Preston Smith (1912–2003)	January 21, 1969 – January 16, 1973 (1457 days; lost nomination)	Democratic	1970	Ben Barnes
41	Dolph Briscoe (1923–2010)	January 16, 1973 – January 16, 1979 (2192 days; lost nomination) (Note: Briscoe lost the Democratic nomination to John Hill.)	Democratic	1972	William P. Hobby Jr.
41	Dolph Briscoe (1923–2010)	January 16, 1973 – January 16, 1979 (2192 days; lost nomination)	Democratic	1974	William P. Hobby Jr.
42	Bill Clements (1917–2011)	January 16, 1979 – January 18, 1983 (1464 days; lost election)	Republican	1978	William P. Hobby Jr.
43	Mark White (1940–2017)	January 18, 1983 – January 20, 1987 (1464 days; lost election)	Democratic	1982	William P. Hobby Jr.
44	Bill Clements (1917–2011)	January 20, 1987 – January 15, 1991 (1457 days; retired)	Republican	1986	William P. Hobby Jr.
45	Ann Richards (1933–2006)	January 15, 1991 – January 17, 1995 (1464 days; lost election)	Democratic	1990	Bob Bullock
46	George W. Bush (b. 1946)	January 17, 1995 – December 21, 2000 (2166 days; resigned) (Note: Bush resigned, having been elected President of the United States.)	Republican	1994	Bob Bullock
46	George W. Bush (b. 1946)	January 17, 1995 – December 21, 2000 (2166 days; resigned)	Republican	1998	Rick Perry
47	Rick Perry (b. 1950)	December 21, 2000 – January 20, 2015 (5144 days; retired)	Republican	Succeeded from lieutenant governor	Bill Ratliff
47	Rick Perry (b. 1950)	December 21, 2000 – January 20, 2015 (5144 days; retired)	Republican	2002	David Dewhurst
47	Rick Perry (b. 1950)	December 21, 2000 – January 20, 2015 (5144 days; retired)	Republican	2006	David Dewhurst
47	Rick Perry (b. 1950)	December 21, 2000 – January 20, 2015 (5144 days; retired)	Republican	2010	David Dewhurst
48	Greg Abbott (b. 1957)	January 20, 2015 – Incumbent (Note: Abbott's third term began on January 17, 2023, and will expire on January 19, 2027; he lost re-election on November 3, 2026.) (in office 4325 days)	Republican	2014	Dan Patrick
48	Greg Abbott (b. 1957)	January 20, 2015 – Incumbent (in office 4325 days)	Republican	2018	Dan Patrick
48	Greg Abbott (b. 1957)	January 20, 2015 – Incumbent (in office 4325 days)	Republican	2022	Dan Patrick
49	Gina Hinojosa (b. 1973)	Governor-elect takes office January 19, 2027	Democratic	2026	Vikki Goodwin

== See also ==
- Gubernatorial lines of succession in the United States § Texas
- First ladies and gentlemen of Texas
- Lieutenant Governor of Texas
- List of Texas governors and presidents
- List of Texas state legislatures

== Sources ==
- "Former Texas Governors". National Governors Association.
- "Texas Constitution". State Democracy Research Initiative. University of Wisconsin Law School.
- Dubin, Michael J. (2003). United States Gubernatorial Elections, 1776–1860: The Official Results by State and County. McFarland. ISBN 0-7864-1439-1 – via Internet Archive.
- Glashan, Roy R. (1979). American Governors and Gubernatorial Elections, 1775-1978. Meckler Books. ISBN 0-7201-1511-6 – via Internet Archive.
- Kallenbach, Joseph E.; Kallenbach, Jessamine S. (1977). American State Governors, 1776-1976. Oceana Publications. ISBN 978-0-379-00665-0 – via Internet Archive.
- Mullaney, Marie Marmo (1994). Biographical Directory of the Governors of the United States, 1988–1994. Greenwood Publishing Group. ISBN 0-313-28312-5 – via Internet Archive.
- Sobel, Robert; Raimo, John (1978). Biographical Directory of the Governors of the United States, 1789-1978. Vol. 4. Meckler Books. ISBN 0-930466-01-2 – via Internet Archive.
- Thorpe, Francis Newton, ed. (1909). The Federal and State Constitutions, Colonial Charters, and Other Organic Laws of the States, Territories, and Colonies Now or Heretofore Forming the United States of America. Vol. 6. United States Government Publishing Office – via Internet Archive.
