= 2nd Texas Legislature =

The 2nd Texas Legislature met from December 13, 1847 to March 20, 1848 in regular session. All members of the House of Representatives and about half of the members of the Senate were elected in 1847.

== Sessions ==
- 2nd Regular session: December 13, 1847 – March 20, 1848

== Officers ==
=== Senate ===
Lieutenant Governor
John Alexander Greer, Democrat
President pro tempore
Edward Burleson, Democrat

=== House of Representatives ===
Speaker of the House
James Wilson Henderson, Democrat

== Members ==
=== Senate ===
Members of the Texas Senate for the Second Texas Legislature:

District	Senator	Term start	Term end	Party
1	William M. "Buckskin" Williams	December 13, 1847	November 5, 1849	Democratic
2	James B. Wootten	December 13, 1847	November 5, 1849	[data missing]
3	Edward Clark (Note: Clark was elected but never sworn)	—N/a	—N/a	—N/a
4	David Aaron Gage	December 17, 1847	November 5, 1849	[data missing]
4	Isaac Parker	February 16, 1846	November 5, 1849	Democratic
5	Benjamin Rush Wallace	February 16, 1846	November 5, 1849	[data missing]
6	John H. McRae	December 13, 1847	November 5, 1849	[data missing]
7	William C. Abbott	December 14, 1847	November 5, 1849	[data missing]
8	Henry J. Jewett	February 16, 1846	November 5, 1849	[data missing]
9	Jesse Grimes	December 13, 1847	November 5, 1849	[data missing]
10	Isaac W. Brashear	December 15, 1847	November 5, 1849	Democratic
11	Richard Bache Jr. (Note: Bache won the special election to fill Thomas Freeman McKinney's unexpired term)	December 28, 1847	March 17, 1848	[data missing]
12	Stephen W. Perkins	December 13, 1847	November 5, 1849	[data missing]
13	Philip Minor Cuney	December 13, 1847	November 5, 1849	Democratic
14	John Winfield Scott Dancy	December 13, 1847	November 5, 1849	[data missing]
15	Edward Burleson	February 16, 1846	November 5, 1849	[data missing]
16	Robert McAlpin Williamson	February 16, 1846	November 5, 1849	Democratic
17	Alexander H. Phillips	February 16, 1846	March 1, 1848	Anti tariff
18	José Antonio Navarro	December 13, 1847	November 5, 1849	[data missing]
19	Henry Lawrence Kinney (Note: Kinney was elected but never sworn)	—N/a	—N/a	—N/a
19	Edward Fitzgerald (Note: Fitzgerald resigned)	February 5, 1848	March 20, 1848	[data missing]
F	James G. Bourland	December 13, 1847	November 5, 1849	[data missing]

- Bourland was a floating senator "conjointly" elected from Bowie, Red River, Fannin, and Lamar counties

=== House of Representatives ===
Members of the House of Representatives for the Second Texas Legislature:

District	Representative	Term start	Term end	Party
Austin	William E. Crump	December 13, 1847	November 5, 1849	[data missing]
Austin	Charles Railey	December 13, 1847	November 5, 1849	[data missing]
Bastrop	Thomas Jones Hardeman	December 13, 1847	November 5, 1849	[data missing]
Bexar	Mathew A. Dooley	December 16, 1847	November 5, 1849	[data missing]
Bexar	Henry Martyn Lewis	December 13, 1847	November 5, 1849	[data missing]
Bowie	Samuel Fountain Mosely	December 13, 1847	November 5, 1849	[data missing]
Bowie	Hardin Richard Runnels	December 13, 1847	November 5, 1849	[data missing]
Brazoria	Guy Morrison Bryan	December 13, 1847	November 5, 1849	[data missing]
Brazoria	Elisha M. Pease	December 13, 1847	November 5, 1849	[data missing]
Brazos	Elliott McNeil Millican	December 13, 1847	November 5, 1849	[data missing]
Colorado	John Forrester Miller	December 13, 1847	November 5, 1849	[data missing]
Colorado	William B. Perry	December 13, 1847	November 5, 1849	[data missing]
Fannin	Samuel Bogart	December 13, 1847	November 5, 1849	[data missing]
Fannin	Thomas Jefferson Shannon	December 13, 1847	November 5, 1849	[data missing]
Fayette	William Henry Crutcher	December 13, 1847	November 5, 1849	[data missing]
Fayette	William Graham Webb	December 13, 1847	November 5, 1849	[data missing]
Fort Bend	William S. Rayner	December 13, 1847	November 5, 1849	[data missing]
Galveston	Mark Milton Potter	December 13, 1847	November 5, 1849	[data missing]
Galveston	Hamilton Stuart	December 13, 1847	November 5, 1849	[data missing]
Goliad	Jesse Stoddard	December 13, 1847	November 5, 1849	[data missing]
Gonzales	James L. Allen	December 13, 1847	November 5, 1849	[data missing]
Gonzales	John D. Anderson	December 13, 1847	January 10, 1848	[data missing]
Gonzales	Vacant	January 10, 1848	February 15, 1848	—N/a
Gonzales	William Henry Stewart	February 15, 1848	November 5, 1849	[data missing]
Harris	James Wilson Henderson	December 13, 1847	November 5, 1849	[data missing]
Harris	Magnus T. Rogers	December 13, 1847	January 26, 1848	[data missing]
Harris	Vacant	January 26, 1848	February 19, 1848	—N/a
Harris	Jacob Raphael De Cordova	February 19, 1848	November 5, 1849	[data missing]
Harris	Benjamin Franklin Tankersley	December 13, 1847	November 5, 1849	[data missing]
Harrison	Richard Newton Goode	December 13, 1847	November 5, 1849	[data missing]
Harrison	James Franklin Taylor	December 13, 1847	November 5, 1849	Whig
Harrison	Erwin M. Wilder	December 13, 1847	December 21, 1847	Whig
Houston	Steward Alexander Miller	December 13, 1847	November 5, 1849	Democratic
Houston	William Turner Sadler	December 13, 1847	November 5, 1849	Democratic
Jackson	Benjamin Jobe White	December 13, 1847	November 5, 1849	[data missing]
Jasper	Zimri Williams Eddy	December 13, 1847	November 5, 1849	[data missing]
Jefferson	James H. Armstrong	December 13, 1847	November 5, 1849	[data missing]
Lamar	William Howard Bourland	December 13, 1847	November 5, 1849	Democratic
Lamar	Johnson Wren	December 13, 1847	November 5, 1849	[data missing]
Liberty	John H. Davis	December 13, 1847	November 5, 1849	[data missing]
Liberty	William Fields	December 13, 1847	November 5, 1849	[data missing]
Matagorda	Thomas Mason Dennis	February 26, 1848	November 5, 1849	[data missing]
Milam	James Shaw	February 26, 1848	November 5, 1849	[data missing]
Montgomery	Thomas Carothers	December 13, 1847	November 5, 1849	[data missing]
Montgomery	Charles G. Keenan	December 13, 1847	November 5, 1849	[data missing]
Montgomery	Jerome B. McCown	December 13, 1847	November 5, 1849	[data missing]
Montgomery	Arch McNeill	December 13, 1847	November 5, 1849	[data missing]
Nacogdoches	Elisha Everett Lott	December 13, 1847	November 5, 1849	[data missing]
Nacogdoches	John Henninger Reagan	December 13, 1847	November 5, 1849	[data missing]
Nacogdoches	Adolphus Sterne	December 13, 1847	November 5, 1849	[data missing]
Red River	Benjamin Holland Epperson	December 13, 1847	November 5, 1849	Whig
Red River	James Gilliam	December 13, 1847	November 5, 1849	[data missing]
Red River	William B. Stout	December 13, 1847	November 5, 1849	[data missing]
Refugio	Benjamin Franklin Neal	December 13, 1847	November 5, 1849	[data missing]
Robertson	James M. Davis	December 13, 1847	November 5, 1849	[data missing]
Robertson	Clinton McKamy Winkler	December 13, 1847	November 5, 1849	[data missing]
Rusk	James H. Lyons	December 13, 1847	November 5, 1849	[data missing]
Rusk	Jesse Walling	December 13, 1847	November 5, 1849	[data missing]
Sabine	James M. Burroughs	December 13, 1847	November 5, 1849	Democratic
Sabine	Peter F. Renfro	December 13, 1847	November 5, 1849	[data missing]
San Augustine	William C. Edwards	December 13, 1847	November 5, 1849	Republican
San Augustine	Otis M. Wheeler	December 13, 1847	November 5, 1849	[data missing]
San Patricio	Mirabeau B. Lamar	December 13, 1847	January 28, 1848 (Note: Lamar resigned)	[data missing]
Shelby	Emory Rains	December 13, 1847	November 5, 1849	[data missing]
Shelby	James Alfred Truitt	December 13, 1847	November 5, 1849	[data missing]
Travis	Samuel Haynie	December 13, 1847	November 5, 1849	[data missing]
Victoria	A.J. Cunningham	December 13, 1847	November 5, 1849	[data missing]
Washington	Van Rensaeller Irion	December 13, 1847	November 5, 1849	Democratic
Washington	Jerome Bonaparte Robertson	December 13, 1847	November 5, 1849	[data missing]
Washington	James Willie	December 13, 1847	November 5, 1849	[data missing]

== Membership Changes ==
=== Senate ===
District	Outgoing Senator	Reason for Vacancy	Successor	Date of Successor's Installation
District 11	Richard Bache Jr.	Senator Bache died March 17, 1848	None	—N/a
District 17	Alexander H. Phillips	Senator Phillips resigned March 1, 1848.	None	—N/a
District 19	Henry Lawrence Kinney	Senator Kinney resigned before December 18, 1847.	Edward Fitzgerald	February 5, 1848
District 19	Edward Fitzgerald	Senator Fitzgerald resigned March 20, 1848.	None	—N/a

=== House of Representatives ===
District	Outgoing Representative	Reason for Vacancy	Successor	Date of Successor's Installation
Gonzales	John D. Anderson	Representative Anderson resigned due to ill health on January 10, 1848	William Henry Stewart	February 15, 1848
Harris	Magnus T. Rogers	Representative Rogers died on January 26, 1848.	Jacob Raphael De Cordova	February 19, 1848
Harrison	Erwin M. Wilder	Representative Wilder was granted compassionate leave and never returned.	None	—N/a
San Patricio	Mirabeau B. Lamar	Representative Lamar resigned on January 8, 1848.	None	—N/a

- Gonzales: Stewart succeeded Anderson, who had resigned in January 1848, on February 15, 1848.
- Harris: Jacob Raphael De Cordova succeeded Magnus Rogers after his death and took the oath of office on February 19, 1848.
