= 4th Texas Legislature =

The 4th Texas Legislature met from November 3, 1851 to February 7, 1853 in its regular session and one called session. All members of the House of Representatives and about half of the members of the Senate were elected in 1850.

== Sessions ==
- 4th Regular session: November 3, 1851 – February 16, 1852
- 4th First called session: January 10–February 7, 1853

== Officers ==
=== Senate ===
Lieutenant Governor
James Wilson Henderson, Democrat
President pro tempore
Edward Burleson, Democrat, Regular session
Jesse Grimes, Democrat, Regular session, First called session

- Senator Burleson died during the regular session on December 26, 1851.

=== House of Representatives ===
Speaker of the House
David Catchings Dickson, Democrat

Add to Representatives: Issac B. McFarland, Democrat, elected in 1851 from La Grange, Fayette County

Sources: several obituaries, family history, list of One Hundredth Anniversary of the District Courts of Travis County, Texas

== Members ==
=== Senate ===
Members of the Texas Senate for the Fourth Texas Legislature:

District	Senator	Party	Took office
1	Joseph H. Burks	Democrat	1851
2	William M. "Buckskin" Williams	Democrat	1851 (First time:1846–1849)
3	Sam Bogart	Democrat	1851
4	Hart Hardin	Democrat	1849
5	M. D. K. Taylor	Democrat	1851
6	George Washington Hill	Democrat	1851
7	Isaac Parker	Democrat	1847
8	Stephen Reaves	Democrat	1851
9	William Thomas Scott	Democrat	1851 (First time:1846–1847)
10	Z. Williams Eddy	Democrat	1851
11	Adolphus Sterne	Democrat	1851
12	James A. Truitt	Democrat	1851
13	James Davis	Democrat	1851
14	James H. Armstrong	Democrat	1851
15	Jesse Grimes	Democrat	1846
16	William S. Day	Democrat	1851
17	Peter W. Gray	Democrat	1851
18	Franklin H. Merriman	Democrat	1851
19	James Charles Wilson	Democrat	1851
20	John Winfield Scott Dancy	Democrat	1851 (First time:1847–1849)
21	Edward Burleson	Democrat	1846
22	Baron Otfried Hans Freiherr von Meusebach	Democrat	1851
23	Thomas Hinds Duggan	Democrat	1851
24	Israel B. Bigelow	Democrat	1851
25	Henry Lawrence Kinney	Democrat	1846
26	Rufus Doane	Democrat	1851

=== House of Representatives ===
Members of the House of Representatives for the Fourth Texas Legislature:

District	Representative	First day of term	Last day of term	Counties represented
1	Napoleon Bonaparte Charlton	November 3, 1851	November 7, 1853	Jefferson, Tyler
2	Andrew Jackson Hamilton	November 3, 1851	November 7, 1853	Travis
3	William Fields	November 3, 1851	November 7, 1853	Liberty, Polk

- Hamilton P. Bee
- Guy Morrison Bryan
- David Catchings Dickson
- Randolph C. Doom
- Memucan Hunt, Jr.
- William G. W. Jowers
- William H. Johnson
- Evans Mabry
- Robert Simpson Neighbors
- John Patrick
- Robert Peebles
- Emory Rains
- James Rowe
- Hardin Richard Runnels
- Charles Bellinger Tate Stewart
- Benjamin E. Tarver
- Robert H. Taylor
- Andrew Jackson Titus
- Amasa Turner

== Membership Changes ==
=== Senate ===
District	Outgoing Senator	Reason for Vacancy	Successor	Date of Successor's Installation
District 11	Adolphus Sterne	Senator Sterne died March 27, 1852.	Steward Alexander Miller	January 20, 1852
District 18	Franklin H. Merriman	Senator Merriman resigned August 31, 1852.	Mark M. Potter	January 20, 1852
District 21	Edward Burleson	Senator Burleson died December 26, 1851.	John Salmon "Rip" Ford	January 20, 1852
