= 1851 Texas lieutenant gubernatorial election =

- August 4, 1851
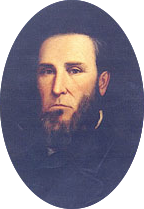

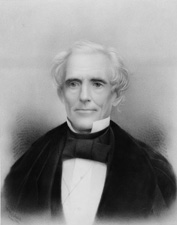

Nominee	James W. Henderson	Matthias Ward
Party	Democratic	Democratic
Popular vote	9,659	7,788
Percentage	37.4%	30.1%
Nominee	Charles G. Keenan	James S. Gillett
Party	Democratic	Democratic
Popular vote	5,740	2,644
Percentage	22.2%	10.2%
Lieutenant Governor before election
John Alexander Greer
Democratic
Elected Lieutenant Governor
James W. Henderson
Democratic

The 1851Texas lieutenant gubernatorial election was held on August 4, 1851, in order to elect the lieutenant governor of Texas. The former Speaker of the Texas House of Representatives, Democrat James W. Henderson, won a competitive four–way race and became the third lieutenant governor of Texas.

== General election ==
The incumbent lieutenant governor, John Alexander Greer did not run for reelection. Instead he chose to challenge the incumbent governor Peter H. Bell. There had not been a strong partisan during the Republic period of Texas. The Democrats did have a strong presence within the state, as a result of the 1848 presidential election, but not all members of the political class had aligned themselves to the new party. Even if they did identify with a political party, candidates often ran independent campaigns.

James Henderson, who had run unsuccessfully for the office of lieutenant governor in the previous election, campaigned for the office again. His foremost opponents were state senator Matthias Ward and the incumbent Speaker of the Texas House Charles Keenan.

=== Candidates ===
- James Shackleford Gillett, lawyer, Texas Ranger, representative in the Texas House of Representatives
- James Wilson Henderson, surveyor, lawyer, former Speaker of the Texas House of Representatives
- Charles G. Keenan, doctor, Speaker of the Texas House of Representatives
- Matthias Ward, state senator, member in the Republic of Texas Congress

=== Results ===
Texas lieutenant gubernatorial election, 1851
Party	Candidate	Votes	%
Democratic	James W. Henderson	9,659	37.39
Democratic	Matthias Ward	7,788	30.15
Democratic	Charles G. Keenan	5,740	22.22
Democratic	James S. Gillett	2,644	10.24
Total votes		25,831	100.00
Democratic hold			

== Aftermath ==
Governor Peter H. Bell, who was reelected in the 1851 gubernatorial election, resigned from the office in order to fill a vacancy in congress. This led to James Henderson becoming Governor for the final 28 days of Bell's term.
