= 1857 Texas lieutenant gubernatorial election =

- August 3, 1857
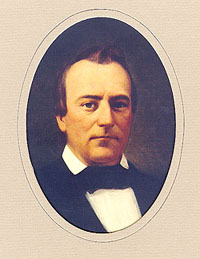

Nominee	Francis Lubbock	Jesse Grimes
Party	Democratic	Independent
Popular vote	33,379	20,318
Percentage	61.1%	37.2%
Lieutenant Governor before election
Hardin Richard Runnels
Democratic
Elected Lieutenant Governor
Francis Lubbock
Democratic

The 1857 Texas lieutenant gubernatorial election was held on August 3, 1857, to elect the lieutenant governor of Texas. Democratic candidate Francis R. Lubbock defeated independent candidate Jesse Grimes to become the sixth lieutenant governor of the state.

== Background ==
Since the 1848 election, the Democratic Party had become the dominant political apparatus in the state. However, when it came to statewide offices, the party lacked organization for nominating candidates and most campaigns were conducted on an independent basis. The sudden rise and success of the American Party, popularly called the "Know Nothings", in the elections of 1854 and 1855, especially the dramatic party swaps of several high-profile Democratic officials, shocked the Democrats and triggered a mass organizational and logistical campaign to solidify the influence of the party's internal operation. After multiple years of having conventions fail due to lack of attendance from across the state, this drive resulted in the 1856 state convention having over 200 delegates from 91 of the state's 99 counties.

The Know Nothings also held a convention in 1856, but the national party collapsed over a split on the issue of slavery which was the defining political question of the era. In addition to the Know Nothings nativist and anti-catholic stances, many in the South were attracted to the party over its support of maintaining the Union amid rising sectionalism and threats of secession. The most prominent of these politicians in Texas was United States Senator and former President of Texas, Sam Houston.

The collapse of the Know Nothings left the Democratic Party as the sole political organization in the state. The 1857 Democratic convention was the largest ever had up to that point, and for the first time it nominated a unified slate of candidates for statewide office with lieutenant governor Hardin R. Runnels running for governor and Francis Lubbock as his running mate. The party also doubled down on its positions in defense of states rights and the right of the state to secede from the union if the institution of slavery was threatened.

There were many in the state who were concerned about the party's embrace of sectionalism and Sam Houston announced an independent campaign for governor. Former Know Nothings and less radical Democrats moved to support his campaign and soon Jesse Grimes, another figure from the Republic of Texas era, joined the independent ticket as the candidate for lieutenant governor. French Smith, another ally of Sam Houston, also garnered some support around his native Seguin.

== Campaign ==
Runnels lacked the oratorical skills necessary to be the face of the campaign and so Lubbock ended up doing most of the campaigning for the Democratic Party ticket. Houston embarked on a large speaking tour of the state, using his reputation as a war hero and founding father of Texas to gain support. However, his opposition to the Kansas-Nebraska Act and his prioritization of maintaining the Union over states' rights led to the vast majority of the newspapers in the state to oppose his candidacy.

== General election ==
On election day, Lubbock defeated Grimes with over 61% of the vote. The legislature certified the election on November 4, 1857, and Lubbock was sworn into office on December 21, 1857.

=== Candidates ===
- Jesse Grimes, former state senator, former member of Texas Congress, delegate at the Convention of 1836 and signer of the Texas Declaration of Independence (Independent)
- Francis Lubbock, rancher, clerk of the Harris County district court, former Comptroller of the Republic of Texas (Democrat)
- French Smith (Independent)

=== Results ===
Texas lieutenant gubernatorial election, 1857
Party	Candidate	Votes	%
Democratic	Francis Lubbock	33,379	61.12
Independent	Jesse Grimes	20,318	37.20
Independent	French Smith	878	1.61
Write-in		37	0.00
Total votes		54,612	100.00
Democratic hold			
