= James Charles Wilson =

American politician (1816–1861)

- Born: August 24, 1816; Yorkshire, England
- Died: February 7, 1861 (aged 44)
- Occupations: Texas settler and legislator

James Charles Wilson (24 August 1816 – 7 February 1861) was an early settler of Texas and later a state legislator.

Wilson was born in Yorkshire, England, on August 21, 1818. He immigrated to the Republic of Texas in 1836.

In 1842 he joined Charles K. Reese in the ill-fated Somervell Expedition. Captured while serving with the company, he managed to escape on 30 July 1843.

He lived in Brazoria, Texas, where he became district clerk before representing Calhoun, Jackson, Matagorda, and Wharton counties in the House of Representatives of the Third and Fourth Legislatures from 1848 to 1853. In 1856 he became commissioner of the Court of Claims.

In addition to his legal career, Wilson also served as a Methodist minister.

He died in Gonzales on 7 February 1861. Wilson was originally buried in Askey Cemetery near Gonzales but later was moved to the Texas State Cemetery in Austin.

Wilson County, Texas, is named in his honor.

Texas Senate
Preceded by Henry Lawrence Kinney	Texas State Senator from District 19 (Brazoria); 1851–1853	Succeeded by Charles G. Keenan
