= William M. Williams (Texas politician) =

American politician

1st and 2nd Representative of the Texas Senate, District 1
- In office February 16, 1846 – November 5, 1849
- Preceded by: District created
- Succeeded by: Matthias Ward

3rd Representative of the Texas House of Representatives, District 5
- In office November 5, 1849 – November 3, 1851
- Preceded by: District created
- Succeeded by: William George Washington Jowers

4th Representative of the Texas Senate, District 2
- In office November 3, 1851 – November 7, 1853
- Preceded by: Albert Hamilton Latimer
- Succeeded by: Johnson Wren

6th Representative of the Texas House of Representatives, District 3
- In office November 5, 1855 – November 2, 1857
- Preceded by: W. J. Bonner
- Succeeded by: John Harmon Crook

Personal details
- Born: March 28, 1809 Pittsylvania County, Virginia, US
- Died: September 8, 1859 (aged 50) Lamar County, Texas, US
- Spouse: Eliza Jane Emberson
- Children: 3
- Parent: [data missing]

William M. Williams (1809–1859) was a 19th-century Texan politician who served in the Texas House and Senate from 1846 to 1853 and from 1855 to 1857.

== Life ==
Williams was born on March 28, 1809, to currently unknown parents in Pittsylvania, Virginia. He moved to the Republic of Texas on May 2, 1835, at the age of 26. He married Eliza Jane Emberson on September 20, 1839. They had three children together. Eliza died on August 27, 1856. Williams died on September 8, 1859, at the age of 50.

== Politics ==
=== Office holdings ===
- Texas Senate, District 1 from February 16, 1846 – December 13, 1847
- Texas Senate, District 1 from December 13, 1847 – November 5, 1849
- Texas House of Representatives, District 5 from November 5, 1849 – November 3, 1851
- Texas Senate, District 2 from November 3, 1851 – November 7, 1853
- Texas House of Representatives, District 3 from November 7, 1853 – November 2, 1857
