= John B. Jones (disambiguation) =

John B. Jones (1834–1881) was a Texas Ranger and Confederate soldier.

John B. Jones may also refer to:

- John B. Jones (Texas politician), in Third Texas Legislature in 1849
- John Bailey Jones (born 1927), American judge and South Dakota state representative

== See also ==
- John Jones (disambiguation)
