= Justice Latimer =

Justice Latimer may refer to:

- Albert H. Latimer (c. 1800–1877), associate justice of the Texas Supreme Court
- George W. Latimer (1900–1990), associate justice of the Utah Supreme Court and an original member of the U.S. Court of Military Appeals
