= Texas's 11th Senate district =

American legislative district

Texas's 11th State Senate district
Senator
Mayes Middleton; R–Friendswood
- Demographics: 51.5% White; 12.7% Black; 28.9% Hispanic; 7% Asian
- Population: 879,520

District 11 of the Texas Senate is a senatorial district that currently serves portions of Brazoria, Galveston and Harris counties in the U.S. state of Texas.

The current senator from District 11 is Mayes Middleton.

== Biggest cities in the district ==
District 11 has a population of 791,770 with 582,677 that is at voting age from the 2010 census.

	Name	County	Pop. (Note: Population is based on the number of people in the district in that city, not the overall population of that city)
1	Pearland	Brazoria	86,706
2	League City	Galveston	81,998
3	Houston	Harris	71,482
4	Pasadena	Harris	64,394
5	Galveston	Galveston	47,743

== District officeholders ==
Name		Party	Years	Legislature	Counties served
	Thomas F. McKinney		Elected but never sworn	1st	Galveston
	Richard Bache Jr.		Elected but never sworn	1st 2nd	Galveston
1	John B. Jones		November 5, 1849 – November 9, 1849	3rd	Brazoria, Galveston
2	Elisha M. Pease		November 9, 1849 – November 3, 1851	3rd	Brazoria, Galveston
3	Adolphus Sterne		November 3, 1851 – March 27, 1852	4th	Angelina, Houston, Nacogdoches
4	Steward Alexander Miller		January 10, 1853 – November 7, 1853	4th	Angelina, Houston, Nacogdoches
5	Robert Henry Guinn		November 7, 1853 – November 4, 1861	5th 6th 7th 8th	Cherokee
6	John H. Burnett		November 4, 1861 – January 14, 1862	9th	Anderson, Houston, Trinity
7	Leroy W. Cooper		February 2, 1863 – November 2, 1863	9th	Anderson, Houston, Trinity
8	William G. W. Jowers		November 2, 1863 – February 7, 1870	10th 11th	Anderson, Houston, Trinity
9	Ebenezer Lafayette Dohoney	Democratic	February 8, 1870 – January 13, 1874	12th 13th	Fannin, Lamar
10	William E. Moore	Democratic	January 13, 1874 – April 18, 1876	14th	Fannin, Lamar
11	William Blassingame	Democratic	April 18, 1876 – January 11, 1881	15th 16th	Cooke, Grayson
12	J. M. Martin	Democratic	January 11, 1881 – March 8, 1882	17th	Cooke, Grayson
13	William O. Davis	Democratic	April 6, 1982 – January 9, 1883	17th	Cooke, Grayson
14	Samuel C. Patton	Democratic	January 9, 1883 – January 13, 1885	18th	Colorado, Gonzales, Lavaca, Wharton
15	John Woods	Democratic	January 13, 1885 – January 8, 1889	19th 20th	Colorado, Gonzales, Lavaca, Wharton
16	Marcus H. Townsend	Democratic	January 8, 1889 – January 10, 1893	21st 22nd	Colorado, Gonzales, Lavaca, Wharton
17	James M. McKinney	Democratic	January 10, 1893 – January 12, 1897	23rd 24th	Falls, McLennan, Milam
18	James E. Yantis	Democratic	January 12, 1897 – January 8, 1901	25th 26th	Falls, McLennan, Milam
19	Julian J. Swann	Democratic	January 8, 1901 – January 13, 1903	27th	Falls, McLennan, Milam
20	Seth P. Mills	Democratic	January 13, 1903 – January 10, 1905	28th	Falls, McLennan, Milam
21	Thomas P. Stone	Democratic	January 10, 1905 – January 12, 1909	29th 30th	Falls, McLennan, Milam
22	Henry Berryman Terrell	Democratic	January 12, 1909 – January 19, 1915	31st 32nd 33rd 34th	Falls, McLennan, Milam
23	Augustus R. McCollum	Democratic	February 12, 1915 – November 9, 1918	34th 35th 36th	Falls, McLennan, Milam
24	Edgar E. Witt	Democratic	January 14, 1918 – January 13, 1925	36th 37th 38th	Falls, McLennan, Milam
25	John Davis	Democratic	January 13, 1925 – January 11, 1927	39th	Dallas
26	Thomas Bell Love	Democratic	January 11, 1927 – January 13, 1931	40th 41st	Dallas
27	George C. Purl	Democratic	January 13, 1931 – January 8, 1935	42nd 43rd	Dallas
28	Claud C. Westerfeld	Democratic	January 8, 1935 – January 10, 1939	44th 45th	Dallas
29	William Graves	Democratic	January 10, 1939 – January 14, 1947	46th 47th 48th 49th	Dallas
30	Fred R. "Red" Harris	Democratic	January 14, 1947 – January 9, 1951	50th 51st	Dallas
31	George Parkhouse	Democratic	January 9, 1951 – January 13, 1953	52nd	Dallas
32	William T. "Bill" Moore	Democratic	January 13, 1953 – January 8, 1963	53rd 54th 55th 56th 57th	Anderson, Brazos, Burleson, Falls, Freestone, Limestone, Navarro, Robertson, Washington
32	William T. "Bill" Moore	Democratic	January 8, 1963 – January 10, 1967	58th 59th	Anderson, Brazos, Burleson, Falls, Freestone, Lee, Limestone, Navarro, Robertson
33	Barbara Jordan	Democratic	January 10, 1967 – January 9, 1973	60th 61st 62nd	Harris
34	Chet Brooks	Democratic	January 9, 1973 – January 11, 1983	63rd 64th 65th 66th 67th	Harris
34	Chet Brooks	Democratic	January 11, 1983 – January 12, 1993	68th 69th 70th 71st 72nd	Galveston, Harris
35	Jerry E. Patterson	Republican	January 12, 1993 – January 12, 1999	73rd 74th 75th	Brazoria, Galveston, Harris
36	Mike Jackson	Republican	January 12, 1999 – January 8, 2013	76th 77th 78th 79th 80th 81st 82nd	Brazoria, Galveston, Harris
37	Larry Taylor	Republican	January 8, 2013 – January 10, 2023	83rd 84th 85th 86th 87th	Brazoria, Galveston, Harris
38	Mayes Middleton	Republican	January 10, 2023 – present	88th 89th	Brazoria, Galveston, Harris

== Election history ==
Election history of District 11 from 1992.

=== 2022 ===
Mayes Middleton (Republican) was unopposed; as such, the election was cancelled and Middleton was declared elected without a vote.

=== 2020 ===
Texas general election, 2020: Senate District 11
Party	Candidate	Votes	%	±%
Republican	Larry Taylor (Incumbent)	231,268	59.45	−40.55
Democratic	Susan Criss	148,225	38.10	+38.10
Libertarian	Jared Wissel	9,519	2.45	+2.45
Majority		83,043	21.35	−78.65
Turnout		389,012		+78.28
Republican hold				

=== 2016 ===
Texas general election, 2016: Senate District 11
Party	Candidate	Votes	%	±%
Republican	Larry Taylor (Incumbent)	218,201	100.00	+33.98
Majority		218,201	100.00	+67.96
Turnout		218,201		−20.46
Republican hold				

=== 2012 ===
Texas general election, 2012: Senate District 11
Party	Candidate	Votes	%	±%
Republican	Larry Taylor	181,106	66.02	+9.53
Democratic	Jacqueline Acquistapace	93,227	33.98	−7.20
Majority		87,879	32.04	+16.73
Turnout		274,333		−0.51
Republican hold				

=== 2008 ===
Texas general election, 2008: Senate District 11
Party	Candidate	Votes	%	±%
Republican	Mike Jackson (Incumbent)	155,772	56.49	−43.51
Democratic	Joe Jaworski	113,567	41.18	+41.18
Libertarian	Cliff Messina	6,419	2.33	+2.33
Majority		42,205	15.31	−84.69
Turnout		275,758		+55.31
Republican hold				

=== 2004 ===
Texas general election, 2004: Senate District 11
Party	Candidate	Votes	%	±%
Republican	Mike Jackson (Incumbent)	177,554	100.00	+13.70
Majority		177,554	100.00	+27.40
Turnout		177,554		+48.47
Republican hold				

=== 2002 ===
Texas general election, 2002: Senate District 11
Party	Candidate	Votes	%	±%
Republican	Mike Jackson (Incumbent)	103,204	86.30	+29.20
Libertarian	Michael Rubin	16,384	13.70	+13.70
Majority		86,820	72.60	+58.39
Turnout		119,588		+7.55
Republican hold				

=== 1998 ===
Texas general election, 1998: Senate District 11
Party	Candidate	Votes	%	±%
Republican	Mike Jackson	63,492	57.10	+1.50
Democratic	Edward Wesley	47,696	42.90	−1.50
Majority		15,796	14.21	+3.00
Turnout		111,188		−16.40
Republican hold				

=== 1994 ===
Texas general election, 1994: Senate District 11
Party	Candidate	Votes	%	±%
Democratic	Mike Martin	59,047	44.39	−1.84
Republican	Jerry E. Patterson (Incumbent)	73,959	55.61	+6.39
Majority		14,912	11.21	+8.23
Turnout		133,006		−33.66
Republican hold				

=== 1992 ===
Texas general election, 1992: Senate District 11
Party	Candidate	Votes	%	±%
Democratic	Chet Brooks (Incumbent)	92,702	46.24	
Republican	Jerry E. Patterson	98,671	49.21	
Libertarian	Marshall N. Anderson	9,121	4.55	
Majority		5,969	2.98	
Turnout		200,494		
Republican gain from Democratic				
