= 1869 Texas gubernatorial election =

- November 30, 1869
- Turnout: 58.52% ▲11.75 pp
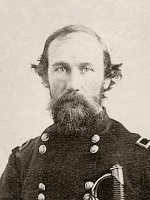

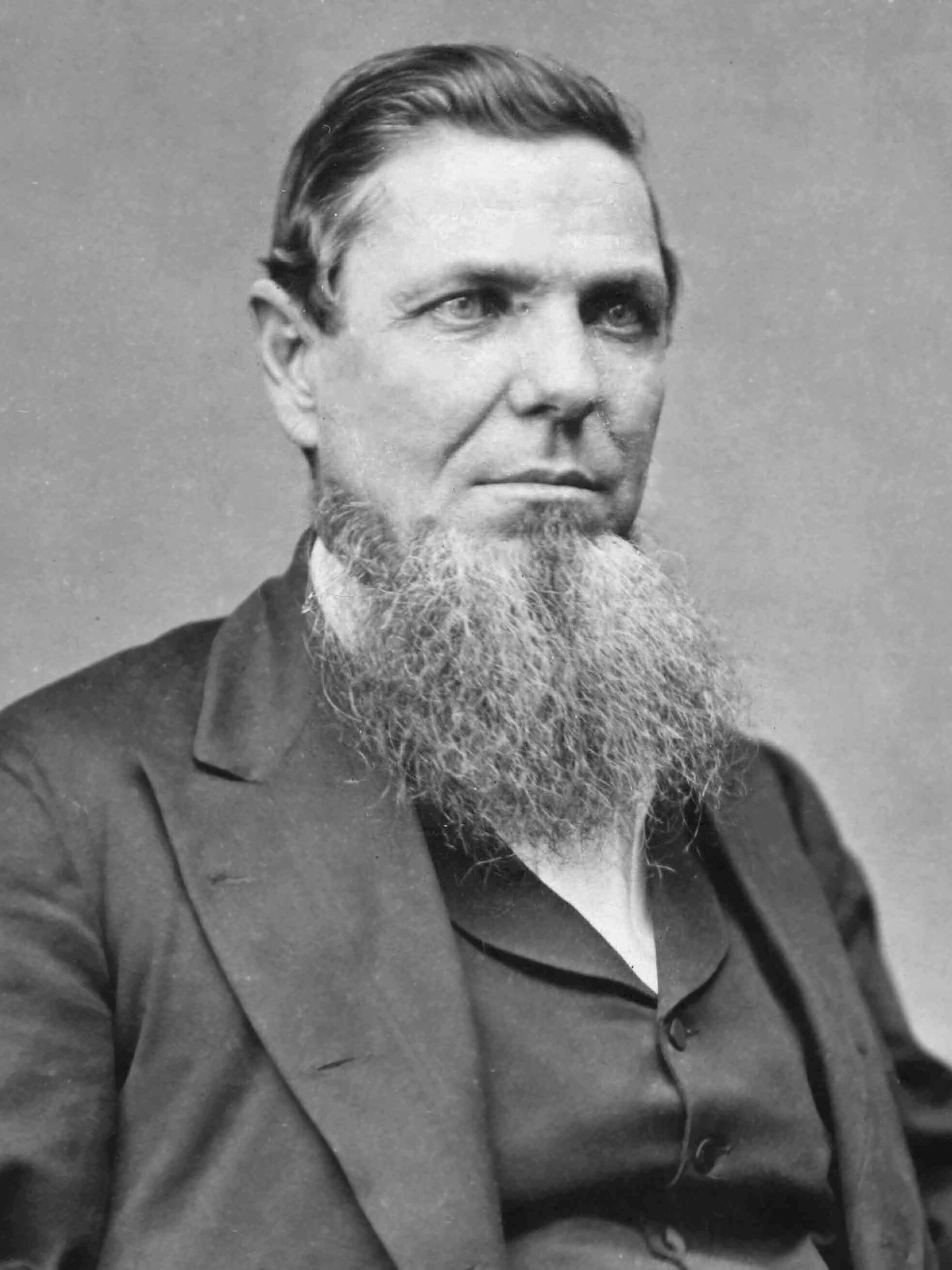
Candidate	Edmund J. Davis	Andrew J. Hamilton
Party	Republican	Republican
Alliance	Radical Republicans	Conservative Republicans; Democratic
Popular vote	39,867	39,092
Percentage	50.25%	49.27%
County results
Davis
50–60%
60–70%
70–80%
80–90%
>90%
Hamilton
50–60%
60–70%
70–80%
80–90%
>90%
Unknown/no vote
Governor before election
Elisha M. Pease
Republican
Governor-elect
Edmund J. Davis
Republican

The 1869 Texas gubernatorial election was held to elect the governor of Texas. Incumbent Governor Elisha M. Pease, who had been appointed by military governor Philip Sheridan, did not run for re-election. Edmund J. Davis narrowly defeated former Governor Andrew J. Hamilton.

Davis' narrow victory exemplified the tenuous hold Republicans had on the state even in the early stages of Reconstruction, indicating that their time in power likely would not last long. This was the last election for governor of Texas won by the Republican Party until 1978; both candidates were nominally members of the party, with Hamilton being a Unionist and former Democrat and Davis being a Radical Republican.

== Background ==
This was the first election held under the newly adopted state Constitution of 1869 which had been ratified in July. At the end of the Civil War, the Union required that all of the former Confederate states adopt a new state constitution which abolished slavery in order to rejoin the Union. Texas had adopted and ratified a constitution that accomplished this in 1866, but Congress did not approve the document because even though it abolished slavery it still prevented freedmen from participating in the political process. This led to a second convention being called which adopted a more progressive document.

At the time, the state was under martial law and occupied by federal troops as part of the 5th Military Reconstruction District. In 1867, military governor Philip Sheridan had removed several state officials for being an "impediment to reconstruction", including the winner of the 1866 gubernatorial election James Throckmorton and replaced him with his Republican opponent in that race Elisha M. Pease. The relationship between Pease and the military administration was strained and on September 30, 1869 he resigned the office due to differences with military governor Gen. Joseph J. Reynolds.

== General election ==
The election was one of the most turbulent and controversial in Texas history. General J. J. Reynolds ordered the drawing up of a new voter registration list, eliminating many of those who had qualified in 1867. Troops stationed at the polls who expressed favor for the Davis campaign probably prevented many Democrats from voting. Only about half of the registered white voters actually cast a ballot, and many polling places were either not opened, or ordered closed. Violence and voter suppression against the state's black voters also took place, with the election board in Navarro County refusing to accept any of their ballots. The county's black voters then traveled to Milam County to try to vote, sparking a riot. The army closed polling places in both counties, and neither had their ballots counted. Many irregularities were reported but never investigated, and official returns reported that Davis won by slightly less than 800 votes.

=== Candidates ===
- Edmund J. Davis, Union Army Brigadier General, delegate at the Secession Convention, and former district attorney and judge of Webb County (Radical Republican)
- Andrew J. Hamilton, Justice on the Texas Supreme Court, former governor (1865 – 1866), former congressman (1859 – 1861) (Conservative Republican)
- Hamilton Stuart, newspaper editor (Independent Democrat)

=== Results ===
1869 Texas gubernatorial election
Party	Candidate	Votes	%
Republican	Edmund J. Davis	39,867	50.25%
Republican	Andrew J. Hamilton	39,092	49.27%
Independent Democrat	Hamilton Stuart	380	0.48%
Total votes		79,339	100.00%
