= Governor Henderson =

Governor Henderson may refer to:

- Charles Henderson (Alabama politician) (1860–1937), 35th Governor of Alabama
- James Pinckney Henderson (1808–1858), 1st Governor of Texas
- James W. Henderson (1817–1880), 4th Governor of Texas
