= Texas Senate, District F =

American legislative district

District F is an obsolete district of the Texas Senate. Though probably not known by the name District F, it was a floterial district that served Bowie, Red River, Fannin, and Lamar Counties. It was only active for the First and Second Texas Legislatures.

== District officeholders ==
Legislature	Senator, District F	Counties
1	James G. Bourland	Bowie, Red River, Fannin, Lamar
2	James G. Bourland	Bowie, Red River, Fannin, Lamar
