= David Catchings Dickson =

American politician (1818–1880)

David C. Dickson
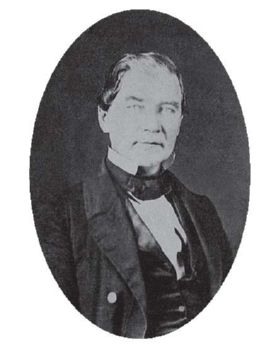

4th Lieutenant Governor of Texas
- In office December 21, 1853 – December 21, 1855
- Governor: Elisha M. Pease
- Preceded by: James W. Henderson
- Succeeded by: Hardin Richard Runnels

9th Speaker of the Texas House of Representatives
- In office November 3, 1851 – November 7, 1853
- Governor: Peter Hansborough Bell
- Preceded by: Charles G. Keenan
- Succeeded by: Hardin Richard Runnels

Member of the Texas House of Representatives
- In office 1846–1847; 1849–1853; 1859–1861

Personal details
- Born: David Catchings Dickson; February 25, 1818 Pike County, Mississippi
- Died: June 5, 1880 (age 62) Grimes County, Texas
- Party: Democratic; Know Nothing

David Catchings Dickson (February 25, 1818 – June 5, 1880) was an American politician and medical doctor in early Texas who served as the ninth speaker of the Texas House of Representatives from 1851 to 1853 and as the fourth lieutenant governor of Texas from 1853 to 1855. He was also a State Senator and unsuccessfully ran for governor of Texas.

== Biography ==
Dickson was born in Pike County, Mississippi. In 1830, Dickson's family moved to Georgetown, Copiah County, Mississippi, where he married Sophronia L. Magee. Dickson attended medical school in Lexington, Kentucky, and after graduating in 1841, moved, as part of a large group, to the Montgomery County, Texas, community of Anderson (present-day Grimes County). Dickson served as a surgeon for the Army of the Republic of Texas. He served as a Justice of the Peace for Montgomery County beginning in 1845.

Sometime before 1850, Dickson had remarried, to the former Nancy Ann E. Magee.

Dickson served in the House of Representatives in the First, Third, and Fourth Texas Legislatures. In the Fourth Legislature, Dickson was elected Speaker of the House, defeating fellow representative Hardin Richard Runnels 30 votes to 27 on the tenth ballot.

In his acceptance speech, Dickson promised to work on eliminating debts incurred by the Republic of Texas and passed on to the state.

In 1853, he was elected lieutenant governor on the Democratic ticket with governor Elisha M. Pease. In 1855, with the backing of the American Party (better known as the “Know Nothings”), he ran for governor against Pease but was defeated by a large margin.

Dickson later returned to the state House, in 1859, for the Eighth Texas Legislature.

On November 16, 1859, he moved that an interpreter be provided for Representative Basilio Benavides of Webb County, an action which prompted outcry from the Dallas Herald. By the end of the Legislature, Dickson had decided not to run again for a House seat.

Dickson served as an officer of the local militia company during the Civil War, but when State Senator Anthony Martin Branch stepped down to serve in the Confederate States Army in 1862, Dickson was elected to complete Branch's term in the Texas State Senate.

After the war, he was appointed financial agent of the State Penitentiary in Huntsville by Governor James Webb Throckmorton and served in that capacity from 1866 to 1867. During his time in Huntsville, Dickson attended to the inmates when a yellow fever outbreak occurred.

Dickson died on June 5, 1880, in Grimes County, Texas, and is buried near his home in Anderson. Dickson was a Mason.

== Notes ==
Party political offices
Preceded by Lemuel D. Evans	Know Nothing nominee for Governor of Texas; 1855	Succeeded by Sam Houston
Texas House of Representatives
Preceded by Unknown	Member of the Texas House of Representatives; 1846–1847	Succeeded by Unknown
Preceded by Unknown	Member of the Texas House of Representatives; 1849–1853	Succeeded by Unknown
Preceded by Unknown	Member of the Texas House of Representatives; 1859–1861	Succeeded by Unknown
Political offices
Preceded by Charles G. Keenan	Speaker of the Texas House of Representatives; 1851–1853	Succeeded by Hardin Richard Runnels
Preceded by James Wilson Henderson	Lieutenant Governor of Texas; 1853–1855	Succeeded by Hardin Richard Runnels
Texas Senate
Preceded by Anthony Martin Branch	Texas State Senator from District 17; 1863–1866	Succeeded by Benton Randolph
