= Matthias Ward =

American politician (1805–1861)

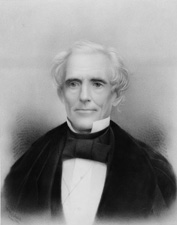

United States Senator from Texas
- In office September 27, 1858 – December 5, 1859
- Appointed by: Hardin Richard Runnels
- Preceded by: James P. Henderson
- Succeeded by: Louis Wigfall

Member of the Texas Senate from the 1st district
- In office November 13, 1849 – November 3, 1850
- Preceded by: William M. "Buckskin" Williams
- Succeeded by: Joseph H. Burks

Personal details
- Born: October 13, 1805 Elbert County, Georgia, U.S.
- Died: October 5, 1861 (aged 55) Warm Springs, North Carolina, U.S.
- Party: Democratic

Matthias Ward (October 13, 1805 – October 5, 1861) was a lawyer and United States Senator from Texas.

== Early life ==
Matthias Ward was born on October 13, 1805, in Elbert County, Georgia. Ward was raised in Madison County, Alabama. He attended an academy in Huntsville, Alabama, taught school and studied law. In 1836 he settled in Bowie, Texas, moving to Clarksville, Texas in 1845 and later to Jefferson, Texas.

== Career ==
Ward served in the seventh and eighth congresses of the Republic of Texas and later in the state senate as a Democrat from 1849 to 1850. This was followed by unsuccessful campaigns for lieutenant governor in 1851 and United States Congress in 1855. In 1855, he ran with a proslavery and states-right campaign against Lemuel D. Evans.

Upon J. Pinckney Henderson’s death in 1858, Ward was appointed to replace him in the United States Senate. He served from September 27, 1858, to December 5, 1859. He failed to secure the nomination to run for the seat in election the next year.

== Personal life ==
Ward died on October 5, 1861, in Warm Springs, North Carolina. He was buried Old Cemetery in Nashville, Tennessee.

Texas Senate
Preceded by William M. "Buckskin" Williams	Texas State Senator from District 1 November 13, 1849 – November 3, 1850	Succeeded by Joseph H. Burks
U.S. Senate
Preceded by J. Pinckney Henderson	U.S. senator (Class 1) from Texas; 1858–1859; Served alongside: Sam Houston, John Hemphill	Succeeded by Louis T. Wigfall
