= Louis Wigfall =

American politician (1816–1874)

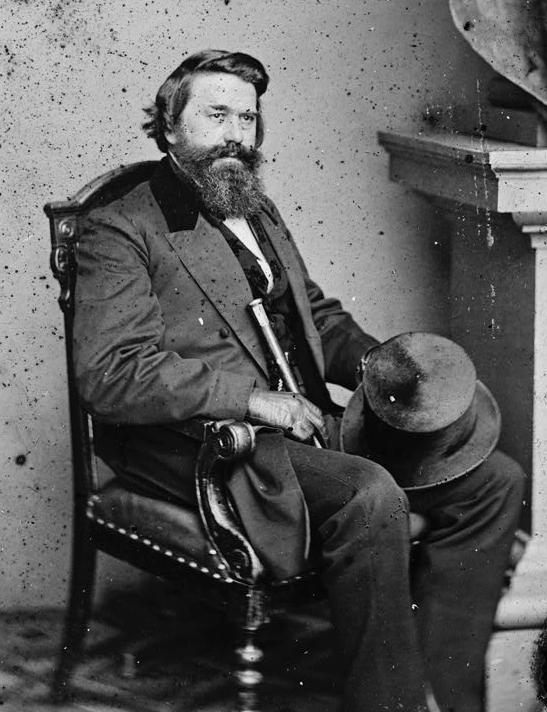

Confederate States Senator from Texas
- In office February 18, 1862 – May 10, 1865
- Preceded by: Constituency established
- Succeeded by: Constituency abolished

Member of the Provisional Congress of the Confederate States from Texas
- In office February 4, 1861 – February 17, 1862
- Preceded by: Constituency established
- Succeeded by: Constituency abolished

United States Senator from Texas
- In office December 5, 1859 – March 23, 1861
- Preceded by: Matthias Ward
- Succeeded by: James Flanagan (1870)

Member of the Texas Senate from the 8th district
- In office November 7, 1857 – December 7, 1859
- Preceded by: William Scott
- Succeeded by: E. A. Blanch

Personal details
- Born: Louis Trezevant Wigfall; April 21, 1816 Edgefield, South Carolina, U.S.
- Died: February 18, 1874 (aged 57) Galveston, Texas, U.S.
- Party: Democratic
- Spouse: Charlotte Cross (m. 1841)
- Children: 3
- Education: University of Virginia; University of South Carolina (BA)

Military service
- Allegiance: United States; Confederate States
- Branch/service: US Volunteers; Confederate States Army
- Years of service: 1837; 1861–1862
- Rank: Lieutenant; Brigadier general
- Battles/wars: Second Seminole War; American Civil War

Louis Trezevant Wigfall (April 21, 1816 – February 18, 1874) was an American politician who served as a Confederate States senator from Texas from 1862 to 1865. A slaveowner, he was among a group of leading secessionists known as Fire-Eaters, advocating the preservation and expansion of an aristocratic agricultural society based on slave labor. He briefly served as a Confederate Brigadier General of the Texas Brigade at the outset of the American Civil War before taking his seat in the Confederate Senate. Wigfall's reputation for oratory and hard-drinking, along with a combative nature and high-minded sense of personal honor, made him one of the more imposing political figures of his time.

== Early life and career ==
=== Youth ===
Wigfall was born on a plantation near Edgefield, South Carolina, to Levi Durant and Eliza Thomson Wigfall. His father, who died in 1818, was a successful Charleston merchant before moving to Edgefield. His mother was of the French Huguenot Trezavant family. She died when young Louis was 13. An older brother, Hamden, was killed in a duel. Another, Arthur, became a bishop in the Episcopal Church.

Tutored by a guardian until 1834, he then spent a year at Rice Creek Springs School, a military academy near Columbia, South Carolina, for children of elite aristocrats. He then entered the University of Virginia. A perceived insult by another student prompted the first of many dueling challenges he would make, but the affair was resolved peaceably.

In 1836 he entered South Carolina College (now the University of South Carolina) to complete his studies, but his attendance was erratic. He developed an interest in the law, participated in the Euphradian Society, and wrote epistles on student rights. Most of his time however, was spent at off-campus taverns rather than at his studies. He abandoned academics altogether for three months to fight in the Second Seminole War in Florida, achieving the rank of Lieutenant of volunteers. Despite these distractions he managed to graduate in 1837. A fellow graduate considered to be his closest friend was John Lawrence Manning, who would later become governor of South Carolina.

In 1839 Wigfall returned to Edgefield and took over his brother's law practice. Having squandered his inheritance, and with a proclivity for drinking and gambling, he accumulated debts. He borrowed from friends to maintain a freewheeling lifestyle, including from his future bride. "Mere office business" as an upcountry lawyer did not suit his temperament and sense of purpose, nor prove to be as profitable as he had hoped.

=== Personal life ===
In 1841 Wigfall married his second cousin, Charlotte Maria Cross, daughter of the prominent Charlestown lawyer and former South Carolina State Controller, Col. George Warren Cross, and his wife, Frances Maria Halsey. They had three daughters: Francis Halsey, Louise Sophie, and Mary Frances (Fanny) Wigfall. Louise was a Civil War diarist.

=== Violence and politics ===
In the South Carolina gubernatorial election of 1840, Wigfall actively supported the candidacy of John Peter Richardson over the more radical James Henry Hammond, which led to public exchanges of arguments and insults. In a five-month period, Wigfall managed to get into a fistfight, two duels, three near-duels, and was charged, but not indicted, for killing a man. This outbreak of political violence culminated in 1840 on an island in the Savannah River near Augusta, Georgia, where Wigfall took a bullet through both thighs while dueling with future Congressman Preston Brooks. Although Hammond lost the race for Governor, he attempted to mediate the dispute between the two hot-headed young men. Wigfall received an aide-de-camp and Lieutenant Colonelcy on Governor Richardson's staff, but never was completely satisfied with the outcome of the Brooks affair.

This initial foray into politics and the Brooks affair destroyed his law practice. He was elected delegate to the South Carolina Democratic convention in 1844, but his violent temperament and behind-the-scenes meddling had already doomed his youthful political ambitions. He piled up medical bills because of a sickly infant son who eventually died. Sheriff sales followed, swallowing up his Edgefield estate. A Texas cousin, former South Carolina governor James Hamilton Jr., arranged a fresh start with a law partnership.

Wigfall's reputation as a duelist, often exaggerated, followed him his entire life, even though he gave up the practice entirely after his marriage. However, he would continue to claim the code duello was an important "factor in the improvement of both the morals and manners of the community."

=== Gone to Texas ===
Arriving in Texas in 1848, Wigfall joined William B. Ochiltree's law practice at Nacogdoches, Texas, then settled in Marshall, Texas. He quickly dove back into politics, serving in the Texas House of Representatives from 1849 to 1850, and in the Texas Senate from 1857 to 1860. He became a staunch political opponent of Sam Houston. When Houston ran for governor in 1857, Wigfall followed him on the campaign trail, attacking his congressional record at each of Houston's stops, and accused Houston of being a traitor to the South. He claimed that Houston had ambitions for a presidential nomination and courted the support of Northern abolitionists.

He organized state Democrats to resist the Know Nothing party, but with their defeat his radical views descended in the estimation of Democratic moderates. John Brown's Raid on Harpers Ferry propelled him and his radical views back to prominence in the state.

=== United States Senator ===
The Texas legislature elected Wigfall to the United States Senate in 1859 as a Democrat to the 36th United States Congress to fill the vacancy caused by the death of James Pinckney Henderson. Matthias Ward was appointed to the Senate following Henderson's death and served from September 27, 1858, until Wigfall was elected and sworn in on December 5, 1859. Wigfall served until March 23, 1861, when he withdrew. He was expelled from the Senate on July 11, 1861, for support of the rebellion. He also served as a member of the Texas delegation to the Provisional Confederate Congress, which formed the provisional government of the Confederacy, and which selected Jefferson Davis as its president. Wigfall had continued to hold his seat after Texas had seceded on February 1, 1861, and was admitted to the Provisional Confederate Congress on March 2, 1861, exhorting the rightness of the Southern cause and berating his Northern colleagues whether on the floor of the Senate or in Capitol Hill saloons. During this time in Washington, he spied on Federal preparations for the coming conflict, secured weapons for delivery south, and upon expulsion by his fellow Senators, he went to Baltimore, Maryland, and recruited soldiers for the new Confederacy before traveling to the Confederate capital at Richmond, Virginia.

== American Civil War ==
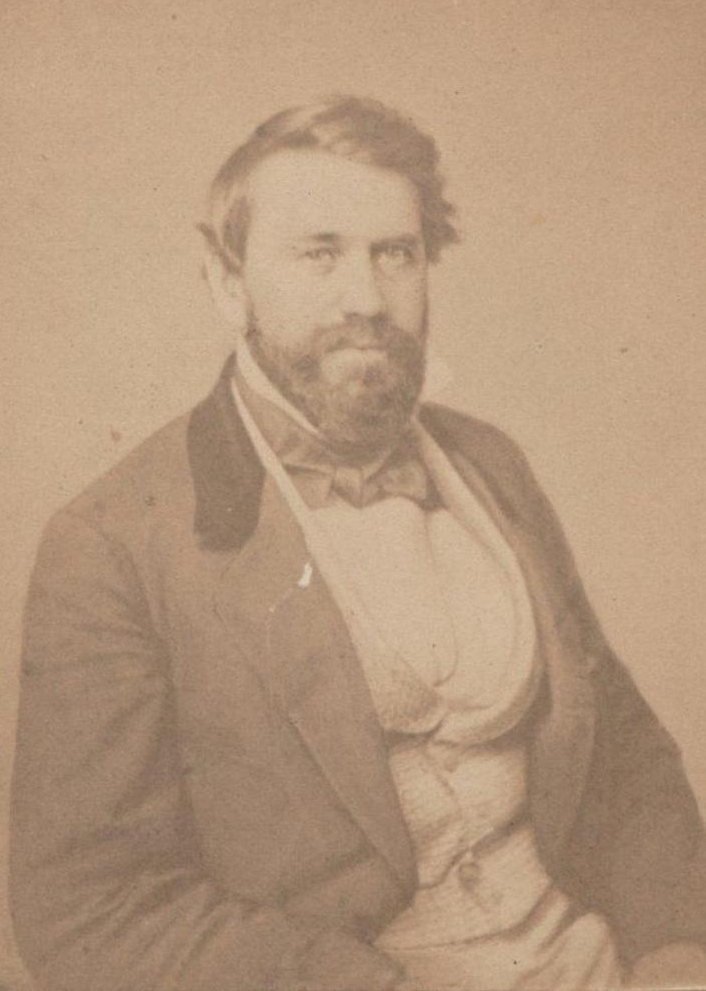
Louis Wigfall in 1861

In the days leading up to the start of hostilities, Wigfall advocated an attack on Fort Sumter and Fort Pickens in Florida to prompt Virginia and other upper southern slave states to join the Confederacy. In January 1865, Wigfall stated his reasons for having supported the Confederacy, namely, opposition to social equality:

Sir, I wish to live in no country where the man who blacks my boots or curries my horse is my equal.

— Louis Wigfall, January 1865, Richmond.

He arrived in Charleston, South Carolina, as the siege of Fort Sumter commenced. According to diarist Mary Chestnut, he was the only "thoroughly happy person I see." While serving as an aide to General Beauregard during the bombardment of Fort Sumter, and without authorization, he rowed a skiff out to the island fort and demanded its surrender from Major Robert Anderson. The incident was widely reported in the newspapers furthering his celebrity, but the story redacted the important detail that Wigfall had not spoken to Beauregard in two days. When the authorized emissaries arrived at the fort, they were dismayed upon learning that Wigfall had granted terms to Anderson that Beauregard had already rejected.

=== Brigade commander ===
With his newfound celebrity Wigfall secured an appointment to full colonel of the 1st Texas Infantry Regiment, and a rapid promotion thereafter to brigadier general of the "Texas Brigade" in the Confederate Army. He took up residence near his encamped troops in a tavern at Dumfries, Virginia, during the winter of 1861–1862, where he would frequently call the men to arms at midnight, imagining a Federal invasion. His nervousness was blamed on his fondness for whiskey and hard cider. He appeared visibly drunk, on and off-duty, in the presence of his men on more than one occasion. He resigned his commission in February 1862 to take a seat in the Confederate Senate, and was replaced by John Bell Hood.

=== Confederate States Senator ===
At the beginning of the war Wigfall was a close friend of Confederate President Jefferson Davis. Like political alliances throughout his career, he would first support then split with Davis as the war progressed. Davis supported an increasingly strong national government, while Wigfall, forever an advocate of states' rights, moved to block the creation of the Confederate Supreme Court, fearing Davis' appointments would rule against the states. Wigfall also challenged Davis, a West Point graduate and former United States Secretary of War, on many of his military-related policies, citing his own military experience in the Seminole Wars. Wigfall was a close friend of Confederate General Joseph E. Johnston and frequently proposed legislation on the general's behalf. He was also an early proponent of making Robert E. Lee commander of all Confederate armies.

== Later life ==
At the conclusion of hostilities, Wigfall escaped back to Texas in the company of Texas troops with a forged parole, then went to London in 1866 as an exile, where he intrigued to foment trouble between Britain and the United States. He bought a mine in Clear Creek, Colorado, returning to the United States in 1870. He lived for a while in Baltimore, Maryland, and was in Galveston, Texas, in January 1874. He died a month later of "apoplexy" and is buried there in the Trinity Episcopal cemetery in Galveston.

== In popular culture ==
In the 1992 alternate history/science fiction novel The Guns of the South by Harry Turtledove, Senator Wigfall appears as a character. The book uses real quotes of Wigfall.

In the historical novel The Lincoln Special by Peg A. Lamphier, Wigfall appears as a major character and villain with some creative dramatization. The novel as a whole is about Kate Warne and the Pinkerton Detective Agency investigating the Baltimore Plot against Lincoln.

== See also ==
- List of American Civil War generals (Confederate)
- List of United States senators expelled or censured
- List of United States senators from Texas

== Bibliography ==
- Billups, Carolyn S., Zarvona, Richard Thomas, Lady Louise founder of the Maryland Division United Daughters of the Confederacy: a compilation of official records, newspaper articles and book references on the lives of Louise Wigfall Wright and Daniel Giraud Wright and their descendants as well as David Gregg McIntosh and Virginia Johnson ... , C. S. Billups, 2000.
- Burton, Orville Vernon, In My Father's House Are Many Mansions: Family and Community in Edgefield, South Carolina, UNC Press, 1987 ISBN 0-8078-4183-8.
- Cashion, Ty & de la Teja, Jesus F., The Human Condition in Texas: (Louis T. Wigfall "Just Plain Mean" by Dallas Cothburn), Rowman & Littlefield, 2001, ISBN 0-8420-2906-0.
- Casson, Mark and Spence, Clark C., British Investments and the American Mining Frontier, 1860–1901: Evolution of International Business, 1800–1945, Taylor & Francis, 2000, ISBN 0-415-19009-6, ISBN 978-0-415-19009-1.
- Chesnut, Mary Boykin, Diary From Dixie, D. Appleton Co., 1905.
- Eicher, David J., Dixie Betrayed: How the South Really Lost the Civil War, University of Nebraska Press, 2007, ISBN 0-8032-6017-2.
- Eicher, John H., and David J. Eicher, Civil War High Commands. Stanford: Stanford University Press, 2001. ISBN 978-0-8047-3641-1.
- Green, Edwin Luther, A History of the University of South Carolina, Published by The State Co., 1916.
- Hammond, James Henry, & Bleser, Carol Secret and Sacred: The Diaries of James Henry Hammond, a Southern Slaveholder, University of South Carolina Press, 1997, ISBN 1-57003-222-X, 9781570032226.
- Heidler, David Stephen, Heidler, Jeanne T., Coles, David J. Encyclopedia Of The American Civil War: A Political, Social, and Military History, W. W. Norton & Company, 2002, ISBN 0-393-04758-X.
- Jewett, Clayton E., Texas in the Confederacy: An Experiment in Nation Building, University of Missouri Press, 2002, ISBN 0-8262-1390-1.
- King, Alvy L., Louis T. Wigfall, Southern Fire-eater, Louisiana State University Press, 1970, ISBN 0-8071-0402-7.
- Polley, J. B., Hood's Texas Brigade: Its Marches, Its Battles, Its Achievements, Morningside Bookshop, 1988, ISBN 978-0-89029-037-8.
- Ritter, Charles F., Wakelyn, Jon L., Leaders of the American Civil War: a biographical and historiographical dictionary, Greenwood Publishing Group, 1998, ISBN 0-313-29560-3.
- Sifakis, Stewart. Who Was Who in the Civil War. New York: Facts On File, 1988. ISBN 978-0-8160-1055-4.
- Simpson, Harold B., Hood's Texas Brigade: Lee's Grenadier Guard, Texas Press, 1970, ISBN 1-56013-009-1.
- Warner, Ezra J. (1959). Generals in Gray: Lives of the Confederate Commanders (1st ed.). Baton Rouge: Louisiana State University Press. OCLC 445052.
- Wright, Louise Wigfall, A Southern Girl in '61: The War-Time Memories of a Confederate Senator's Daughter, New York: Doubleday, Page & Company, 1905.
- Walther, Eric H., The Fire-Eaters, Louisiana State University Press, 1992, ISBN 0-8071-1775-7.

Texas Senate
Preceded by William Scott	Member of the Texas Senate from the 8th district 1857–1859	Succeeded by E. A. Blanch
U.S. Senate
Preceded by Matthias Ward	United States Senator (Class 1) from Texas; 1859–1861; Served alongside: John Hemphill	Vacant Title next held by James Flanagan; 1870
Confederate States House of Representatives
New constituency	Member of the Provisional Congress of the Confederate States from Texas; 1861–1862	Constituency abolished
Confederate States Senate
New seat	Confederate States Senator (Class 2) from Texas; 1862–1865; Served alongside: William Oldham	Seat abolished
