= Jesse Grimes =

Republic of Texas politician

- Born: February 6, 1788; Duplin County, North Carolina
- Died: March 15, 1866 (aged 78); Texas
- Occupations: Texas pioneer and politician

Jesse Grimes (February 6, 1788 – March 15, 1866) was a Texas pioneer and politician. Before moving to Texas, he fought in the War of 1812. He was a signer of the Texas Declaration of Independence. He served as a senator in the Republic of Texas Congress and in the Texas State Legislature. Grimes County was named in his honor.

== Early life and family ==
Grimes was born in what is now Duplin County, North Carolina, on February 6, 1788, to Sampson and Bethsheba Grimes. In the War of 1812, he served in an Infantry Company in the West Tennessee Militia. He married his first wife, Martha Smith, in 1813. The family moved to Washington County, Alabama, in 1817. Martha died during childbirth in 1824. They had nine children. He married Mrs. Rosanna Ward Britton in 1826. They had six children.

== Life and career in Texas ==
Grimes then moved to Stephen F. Austin's second colony in what is now Grimes County, Texas, in 1826.

On March 21, 1829, Grimes was elected by the ayuntamiento of San Felipe de Austin as first lieutenant of the First Company, Battalion of Austin. He was elected sindico procurador (city attorney) of the Viesca precinct in December 1830 and in December 1831 was elected a regidor (city councilman). On October 5, 1832, he became a member of Viesca district's subcommittee of safety and vigilance. On October 6, he was appointed district treasurer.

During the Republic of Texas period, Jesse Grimes was the first Chief Justice for Montgomery County, in 1838. The following year, he settled on what is now Grimes Prairie in Grimes County.

== Texas Revolution ==
He represented Washington Municipality as a delegate to the Texas Convention of 1833 and the Texas Consultation of 1835. On November 14, 1835, he was elected to the General Council of the provisional government.

Grimes served as Washington Municipality's representative to the Texas Republic's Constitutional Convention of 1836 at Washington-on-the-Brazos, Texas, at which he signed the Texas Declaration of Independence.

On June 3, 1836, he formed a volunteer company in the Republic of Texas Army.

== Texas state senator ==
He served as Senator from Washington County in the First Congress of the Republic of Texas from October 3, 1836, to September 25, 1837.

He served in the Sixth and Seventh sessions of the Republic of Texas's House of Representatives as the member from Montgomery County. He completed Robert M. Williamson's unexpired term in the Eighth Congress, representing Washington, Montgomery, and Brazos counties, and was elected to the Ninth Congress, which ended on June 28, 1845.

After Texas became a state, he served as state senator in the First, Second, Third, and Fourth Texas Legislatures. He served as President pro tempore of the Texas State Senate in the First Called Session of the Fourth Texas Legislature, in the Regular and Adjourned Sessions of the Sixth Texas Legislature, and all three sessions of the Eighth Texas Legislature.

== Death and legacy ==
Grimes died on March 15, 1866, and was buried in the John McGinty cemetery, east of Navasota, Texas. His remains and those of his second wife were moved to the Texas State Cemetery on October 17, 1929. Grimes County, Texas, was named in his honor.

== See also ==
- Timeline of the Republic of Texas
- History of Texas
- Congress of the Republic of Texas
- Texas Revolution
