= John B. Jones (Texas politician) =

Texas polititican

John B. Jones (10 September 1803 – 11 June 1874) was an American politician.

Jones was a Democratic member of the Third Texas Legislature from 5–9 November 1849, representing District 11 of the Texas Senate until he was succeeded by Elisha M. Pease.
