= Lemuel D. Evans =

American judge (1810–1877)

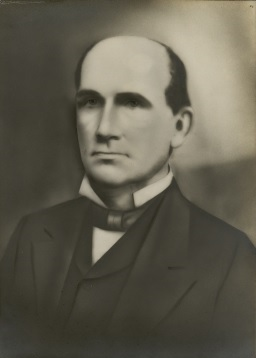
- Undated portrait reproduced in 1899's A Complete History of Texas for Schools, Colleges and General Use.

Chief Justice of the Texas Supreme Court
- In office July 1870 – August 1873
- Preceded by: Amos Morrill
- Succeeded by: Wesley Ogden

Justice of the Supreme Court of Texas
- In office July 5, 1870 – January 29, 1874

Member of the U.S. House of Representatives from Texas's 1st district
- In office March 4, 1855 – March 3, 1857
- Preceded by: George W. Smyth
- Succeeded by: John Henninger Reagan

Personal details
- Born: January 8, 1810 Tennessee, U.S.
- Died: July 1, 1877 (aged 67) Washington, D.C., U.S.
- Resting place: Congressional Cemetery
- Party: Know Nothing

Lemuel Dale Evans (January 8, 1810 – July 1, 1877) was a U.S. Representative from Texas.

Born in Tennessee, Evans studied law and was admitted to the bar. He moved to Marshall, Texas, in 1843 and engaged in the practice of law. He served as member of the state convention that annexed the state of Texas to the Union in 1845.

Evans was elected as the candidate of the American Party to the Thirty-fourth Congress (March 4, 1855 – March 3, 1857). He was an unsuccessful candidate for reelection in 1856 to the Thirty-fifth Congress. When the Civil War began, he was a Unionist in East Texas and shared Sam Houston's Unionist views. In 1860, he was one of the four Texas delegates to the Constitutional Union convention. He served as collector of internal revenue in 1867. He served as member of the Reconstruction Convention in 1868 and as Chief Justice of the Texas Supreme Court in 1870 and 1871. He served as associate justice and presiding judge from 1872 to 1873, when he resigned. In 1875, he was the United States marshal for the eastern judicial district of Texas. He died in Washington, D.C., on July 1, 1877. He was interred in the Congressional Cemetery.

== Sources ==
- United States Congress. "Lemuel D. Evans (id: E000251)". Biographical Directory of the United States Congress.

Party political offices
First	Know Nothing nominee for Governor of Texas; 1853	Succeeded by David Catchings Dickson
U.S. House of Representatives
Preceded by George W. Smyth	Member of the U.S. House of Representatives from Texas's 1st congressional district 1855–1857	Succeeded by John Henninger Reagan
