= 1859 Texas gubernatorial election =

- August 1, 1859
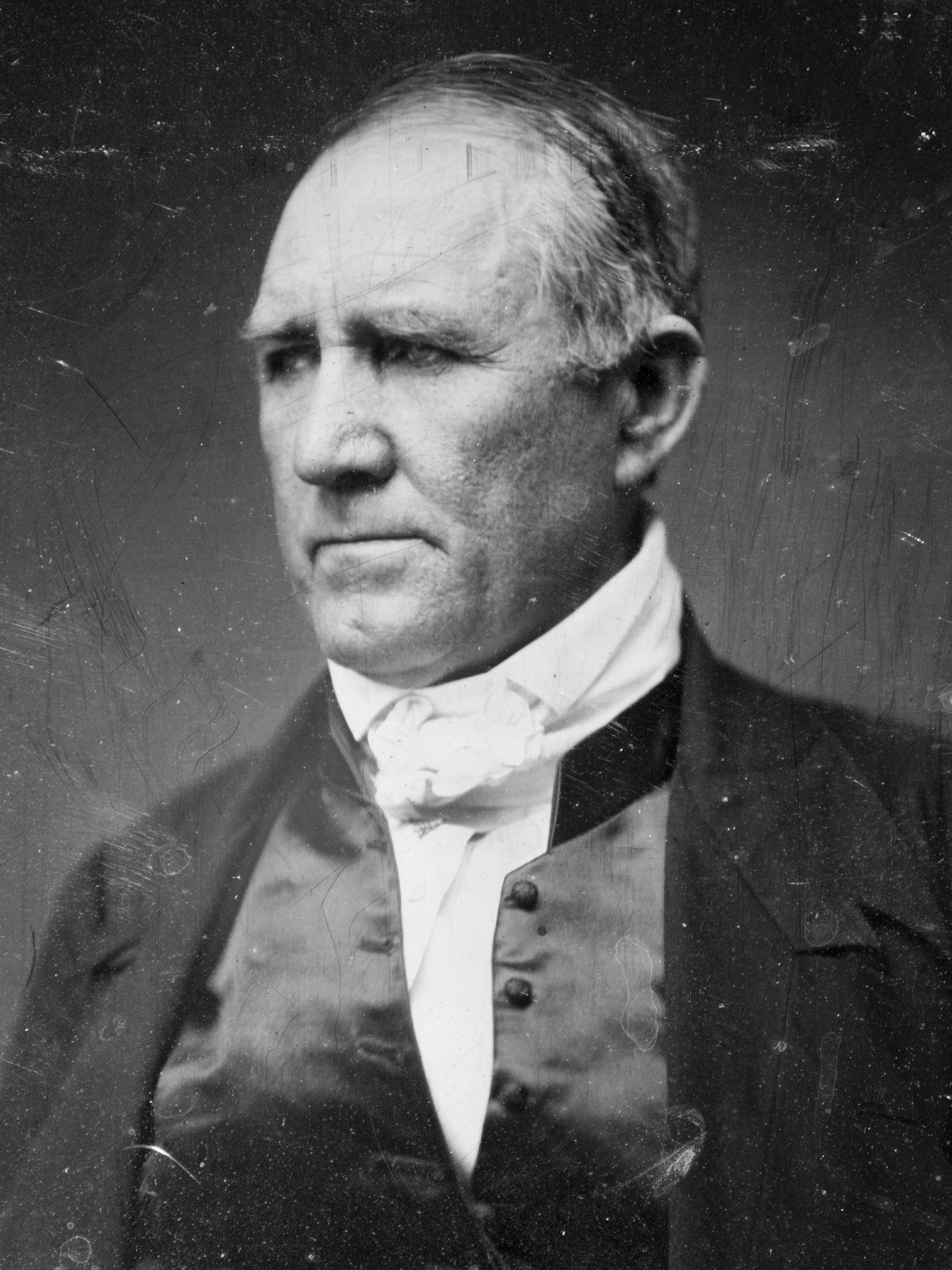

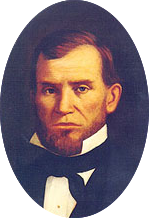
Nominee	Sam Houston	Hardin R. Runnels
Party	Independent	Democratic
Popular vote	36,227	27,500
Percentage	56.79%	43.11%
County Results
Houston
50–60%
60–70%
70–80%
80–90%
>90%
Runnels
50–60%
60–70%
70–80%
80–90%
>90%
Tie
No returns
Governor before election
Hardin R. Runnels
Democratic
Elected Governor
Sam Houston
Independent

The 1859 Texas gubernatorial election was held on August 1, 1859, to elect the governor of Texas. Incumbent Democratic governor Hardin Richard Runnels was running for reelection, but was defeated by Sam Houston, former senator and president of Texas, whom he had beaten two years earlier.

== Background ==
Runnels had beaten Houston in the previous gubernatorial election of 1857, becoming the only person to defeat him in a political campaign. Houston had run a vigorous campaign, making over 60 speeches mainly in east Texas. Despite his high profile, Houston's popularity had long been undermined by claims that he was a drunkard and a coward, as well as more recent criticisms of his positions on slavery while serving as senator.

Despite his defeat and indications that his public service was over there was a belief amongst many in the state and those close to Houston that he would again run. Houston confirmed this privately to his wife Margaret Lea Houston, upon learning of his defeat in 1857 he had told her "Margaret, wait until 1859." In the buildup to the statewide Democratic convention, multiple Newspapers ran stories by Houston supporters urging him to run and commenting that there was a "mighty current" flowing in Houston's favor should he run again and indeed his public perception was being rehabilitated as his criticisms of the Kansas–Nebraska Act and conduct seemed to be vindicated.

== Campaign ==
The Democratic convention was held on May 2, 1859, in Houston. It was bitterly divided over the issues of secession and the reopening of the slave trade. By the end of the convention the Fire-Eaters had won out and Runnels was renominated by the party. On June 3, 1859, Houston listened to the advice of his friends, talked with Margaret and then announced (through a letter to George W. Paschal) that he would run for governor again.

=== Houston ===
In contrast to his campaign in 1857, Houston did not travel the state extensively. In fact his entire campaign consisted of a couple letters and one campaign speech. Similar to 1857 his campaign was not financed nor organized. In his opening letter to George W. Paschal he stated that:

The Constitution and Union embrace the principles by which I will be governed if elected. They comprehend all the old Jacksonian National Democracy I ever professed, or officially practiced.

— Sam Houston

He also wrote on July 2 to Ferdinand Flake (Editor of the Galveston Union) that he was opposed to all "isms", which included the isms of nullificantionism, secessionism, and disunionism and that he would rely upon the Constitution and Union in his governing. While purchasing sheep in Nacogdoches on July 9, he was prompted by some citizens to give a speech and in it he described himself as a "Democrat of the Old School and an Old Fogy in politics". And clarified that it was not politicians who convinced him to run but "the honest yeomanry of the country". He reminded voters that since his vote against the Kansas-Nebraska Act many in the south had declared that the bill was a deception from the beginning.

In addition to these speeches and letters, throughout the campaign Houston would clarify to those writing him his positions on certain issues. For example, he supported the expansion of education saying that the legislature should make education "as free as possible, then...let [it] be accessible to the young men of the country." He had also come out in favor of granting public land to railroad companies. For the rest of the election he remained at home in Independence, and refrained from further campaigning.

=== Runnels ===
Runnels had been the only person to defeat Sam Houston in a political campaign, in the previous election on a fire-eating Democratic ticket. During this election, Runnels was criticized for the inadequate protection of the frontier, Runnels’ wishes to see the slave trade reopened, and his preference for secession. His party was split on these divisive issues and the statewide Democratic convention was bitterly divided but ultimately renominated him.

Indian attacks, the border raids of Juan Cortina, and sectional factionalism were likely factors which lead to Runnels defeat in 1859 in addition to Houston's own personal popularity.

== General election ==
=== Candidates ===
- Sam Houston, former U.S. Senator and President of the Republic of Texas (Independent)
- Hardin R. Runnels, incumbent Governor since 1857 (Democratic)

=== Results ===
1859 Texas gubernatorial election
Party	Candidate	Votes	%
Independent	Sam Houston	36,227	56.79%
Democratic	Hardin Richard Runnels (incumbent)	27,500	43.11%
Write-in		847	0.02%
Total votes		63,788	100.00%
Independent gain from Democratic			

== Analysis ==
While at first it looks like Democrats bolting from Runnels helped carried Houston to victory, this is not the case. The truth is that voter turnout likely influenced Houston's victory. In previous elections in Texas the "Opposition" parties which formed against the Democrats repeatedly failed to mobilize supporters from one election to another and turn-out new voters. This trend ended in this election when, despite the Democrats mobilizing party loyalists to support them, they lost.

The reason for this was Houston's diverse coalition, the bulk of it was made up of new voters and those who had supported him in 1857, however, by dissociating himself from the anti-Catholic, anti-immigrant Know-Nothings and embracing the Unionist label, he apparently attracted the votes of many newcomers and previously apathetic men, including East Texas slave-owners, who were worried that the re-opening of the slave trade would drive down prices, and Citizens on the frontier, who were worried that secession would remove federal troops stationed in the forts out west, who guarded them from hostile Indian attacks. Sam Houston's victory in the race was hailed as a tribute to Unionism as it occurred in one of the most pro-slavery states in the Union. It was Houston's last political position as in 1861 he was removed from the governorship by the new Secessionist government.
