= Alfred Elkins Pace =

American politician

Member of the Texas House of Representatives from the 4th district
- In office November 5, 1849 – September 7, 1850
- Preceded by: District created
- Succeeded by: Harrison G. Hendricks

Personal details
- Born: June 29, 1811
- Died: January 20, 1868 (aged 56)
- Spouse: Elizabeth Saphronia Hardaway
- Parents: Twitty Pace 1789-1849 (father); Susannah Duncan 1794-1844 (mother)

Alfred Elkins Pace (June 29, 1811 - January 20, 1868) was a Texas House member from late 1849 to late 1850.

== Life ==
Pace was born on June 29, 1811, to Twitty Pace and Susannah Duncan. He was the oldest of 8 children. Not much information is known about his life from his birth until his marriage. He married Elizabeth Saphronia Hardaway on May 25, 1851, and had 5 children together between 1852-1860. He later died on January 20, 1868, at the age of 56.
