= Charles G. Keenan =

American physician

Charles Gradison Keenan (c. 1813–1870) was a politician and medical doctor in early statehood Texas who served as Speaker of the Texas House of Representatives during the Third Texas Legislature.

Keenan was born 28 February 1813 in Giles County, Tennessee, to Leanna (McCormick) and John Keenan. John Keenan was the first treasurer of Walker County, Texas while Charles Keenan was the first physician in Huntsville, Texas. Charles Keenan was a United States Army surgeon in the Indian campaigns before arriving in Texas.

Keenan served on the first board of trustees of the Andrews Female Academy. He was a founding member of the Forest Masonic Lodge in Huntsville. He also served as grand junior warden in the Grand Lodge in 1850, and for ten years was grand treasurer of the Texas Grand Chapter of York Rite Masons.

Keenan was elected to the Texas House of Representatives of the First, Second, and Third Texas Legislatures. In the Third Legislature, Keenan was nominated for Speaker of the House and defeated Edward H. Tarrant, 27 votes to 16. Keenan unsuccessfully ran for lieutenant governor in 1851, and afterwards was a superintendent of the State Asylum for the Insane.

Keenan died 15 June 1870 in Huntsville.

== Notes ==
Political offices
Preceded by James Wilson Henderson	Speaker of the Texas House of Representatives; 1849–1851	Succeeded by David Catchings Dickson
