= 1853 Texas gubernatorial election =

- August 1, 1853
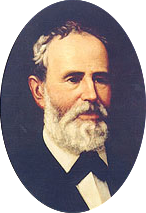

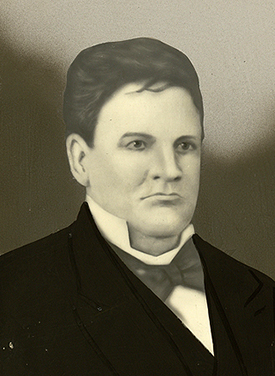

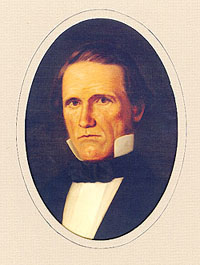

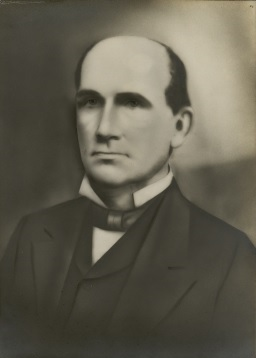

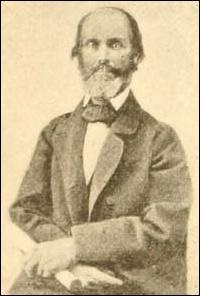
Nominee	Elisha M. Pease	William B. Ochiltree	George T. Wood
Party	Democratic	Whig	Independent Democrat
Popular vote	13,091	9,178	5,983
Percentage	36.21%	25.39%	16.56%
Nominee	Lemuel D. Evans	Thomas J. Chambers
Party	Democratic	Democratic
Popular vote	4,677	2,449
Percentage	12.94%	6.77%
- Results by county: (Note: An alternative color-scheme was used because of the varying vote swings and to better differentiate between counties); Pease: 30–40% 40–50% 50–60% 60–70% 70–80% 80–90% >90% Ochiltree: 30–40% 40–50% 50–60% Wood: 20–30% 30–40% 40–50% 50–60% 60–70% 70–80% 80–90% Evans: 20–30% 30–40% 40–50% 50–60% 60–70% 80–90% Chambers: 20–30% 30–40% 40–50%
Governor before election
Peter H. Bell
Democratic
Elected Governor
Elisha M. Pease
Democratic

The 1853 Texas gubernatorial election was held on August 1, 1853, to elect the governor of Texas.

Incumbent Governor Peter Hansborough Bell did not run for a third term. The election was won by Elisha M. Pease, who received 36% of the vote. This is the lowest percentage of the popular vote a Texas governor has received and still won an election.

== General election ==
=== Candidates ===
- Thomas J. Chambers, unsuccessful candidate for governor in 1851, former chief justice of Texas, land speculator and real estate developer (Democratic)
- John W. S. Dancy, state representative, former member of the Congress of the Republic of Texas (Democratic)
- Lemuel D. Evans, lawyer, former district judge of Harrison County, veteran of the Mexican-American War, delegate to the 1845 annexation convention (Democratic)
- William Beck Ochiltree, Nacogdoches judge, former Secretary of the Treasury of the Republic of Texas, delegate to the 1845 annexation convention (Whig)
- Elisha M. Pease, unsuccessful candidate for governor in 1851, former state senator, former Comptroller of Public Accounts of the Republic of Texas (Democratic)
- George Tyler Wood, former Governor of Texas, plantation owner, veteran of the Mexican-American War (Independent Democratic)

=== Results ===
1853 Texas gubernatorial election
Party	Candidate	Votes	%
Democratic	Elisha M. Pease	13,091	36.21%
Whig	William Beck Ochiltree	9,178	25.39%
Independent Democrat	George Tyler Wood	5,983	16.56%
Democratic	Lemuel D. Evans	4,677	12.94%
Democratic	Thomas J. Chambers	2,449	6.77%
Write-in		459	1.27%
Democratic	John W. S. Dancy	315	0.87%
Total votes		36,152	100.00%
Democratic hold			
