= Elisha M. Pease =

American politician (1812–1883)

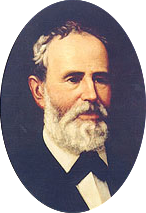

5th & 13th Governor of Texas
- In office August 8, 1867 – September 30, 1869
- Appointed by: Philip Sheridan
- Lieutenant: Vacant
- Preceded by: James W. Throckmorton
- Succeeded by: Edmund J. Davis
- In office December 21, 1853 – December 21, 1857
- Lieutenant: David Catchings Dickson; Hardin Richard Runnels
- Preceded by: James W. Henderson
- Succeeded by: Hardin Richard Runnels

Member of the Texas Senate from the 11th district
- In office November 9, 1849 – November 3, 1851
- Preceded by: John B. Jones
- Succeeded by: Adolphus Sterne

Member of the Texas House of Representatives from the Brazoria district
- In office February 16, 1846 – November 5, 1849
- Preceded by: District established
- Succeeded by: District abolished

Personal details
- Born: January 3, 1812 Enfield, Connecticut, U.S.
- Died: August 26, 1883 (aged 71) Lampasas, Texas, U.S.
- Resting place: Oakwood Cemetery, Austin, Texas, U.S.
- Party: Unionist; Republican
- Profession: Politician

Elisha Marshall Pease (January 3, 1812 – August 26, 1883) was an American politician who served as the fifth and 13th governor of Texas from 1853 to 1857 and again from 1867 to 1869.

== Early life ==
Elisha Marshall Pease was born on January 3, 1812, to Lorrain Thompson Pease and Sarah Marshall Pease. He attended Westfield Academy in Massachusetts.

== Career ==
Among Pease's first jobs was a position as a clerk in Hartford, Connecticut. By early 1835, he moved to Mexican Texas, settling in the local district of Mina while studying law.

== Texas Republic ==
Pease soon became active in the Texas independence movement and after the Texas Revolution began, Pease became the secretary of the provisional government. He served as the assistant secretary at the Convention of 1836 but was not an elected delegate to the convention. After independence had been won, Pease was named the comptroller of public accounts in the government of the new but temporary Republic of Texas.

== Texas State ==
Following the annexation of Texas to the United States, Pease was elected to the Texas House of Representatives in 1845 and reelected in 1847. In 1849, he ran for the Texas Senate from District 11 (Brazoria and Galveston counties) but lost to John B. Jones who was sworn in on November 5, 1849. Pease contested the election, was declared the winner, and was sworn in four days later on November 9, 1849.

Pease first ran for governor in 1851 but withdrew from the race two weeks before the election. He was elected in each of the next two elections, 1853 and 1855. As governor, he paid off the state debt and established the financial foundation that the state would later use to finance its schools and colleges.

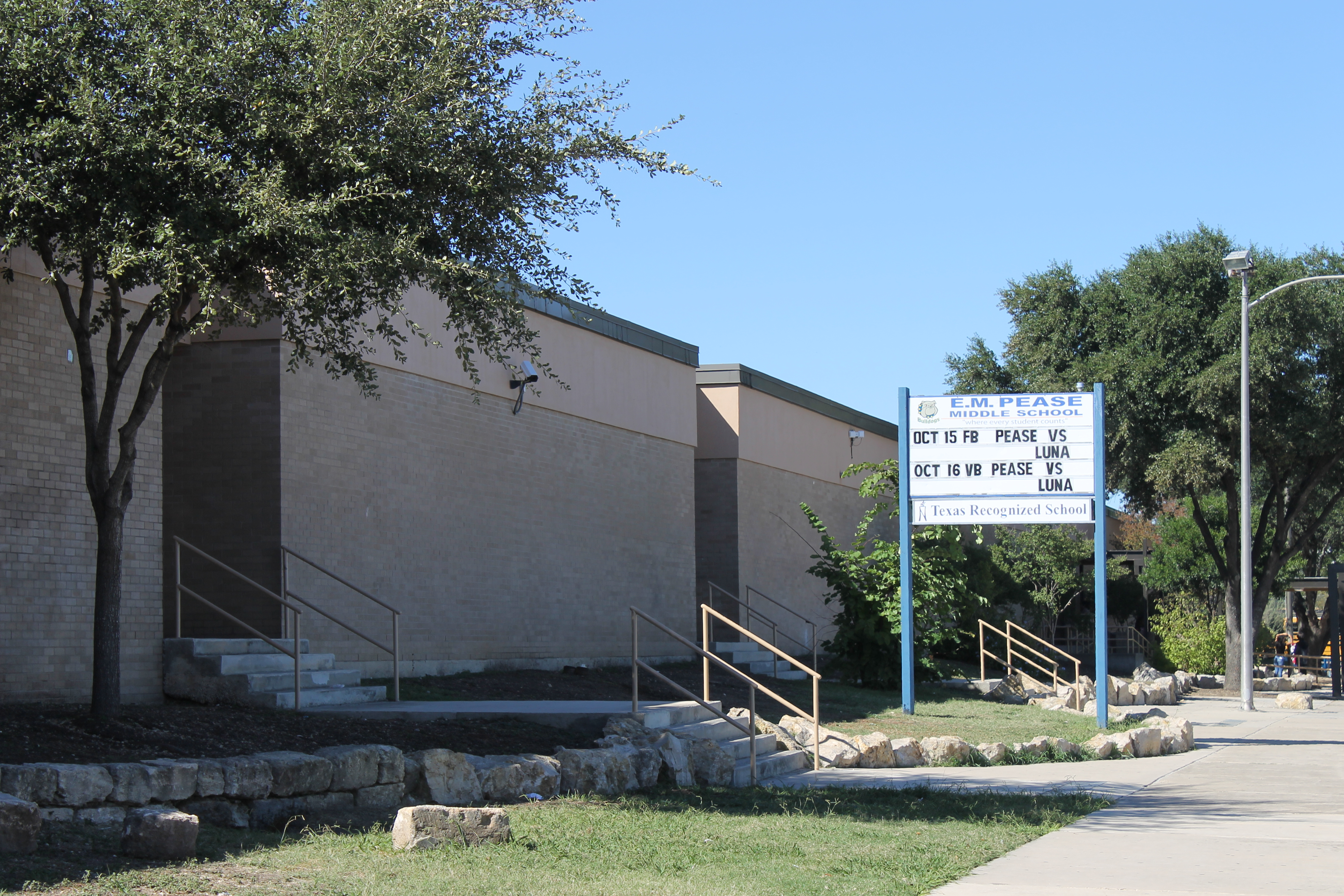
The E. M. Pease Middle School is located at 201 Hunt Lane across from El Sendero subdivision in the Northside Independent School District in San Antonio, Texas.

== Civil War and aftermath ==
After the war, he became a leader in the state Republican Party and was appointed as the civilian governor of Texas in 1867 by General Philip H. Sheridan, who was the military head of the Reconstruction government. Pease's policies as governor alienated both ex-Unionists and ex-Confederates and he resigned in 1869.

== Personal life ==
Pease married Lucadia Christiana Niles in 1850. They had two daughters who reached maturity.

Shortly after their marriage, the Peases vacationed at Niagara Falls, New York. After brief stays in Cincinnati and Louisville, they lodged for a week at the St. Charles Hotel in New Orleans.

During the American Civil War, Pease sided with the Union. He nonetheless enslaved several people; census records show ten enslaved people living and laboring at Pease's Austin plantation in 1860.

== Death and legacy ==
Pease died on August 26, 1883, of apoplexy. He was buried in Austin.

In 1856, surveyor Jacob de Córdova of the Galveston, Houston, and Henderson Railroad Company named a newly discovered river in West Texas the "Pease River" after the governor.

In 1875, Elisha and Lucatia Pease donated their homestead to the City of Austin that would eventually become Pease Park.

== Notes ==
Party political offices
| First | Democratic nominee for Governor of Texas; 1853, 1855 | Succeeded by None |
| First | Republican nominee for Governor of Texas; 1865, 1866 | Succeeded by Edmund J. Davis |
Texas Senate
| Preceded by John B. Jones | Texas State Senator from District 11 (Brazoria); 1849–1851 | Succeeded by Adolphus Sterne |
Political offices
| Preceded by James W. Henderson | Governor of Texas; 1853–1857 | Succeeded by Hardin R. Runnels |
| Preceded by James W. Throckmorton | Governor of Texas; 1867–1869 | Succeeded by Edmund J. Davis |
