= 1855 Texas gubernatorial election =

- August 6, 1855
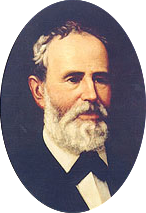

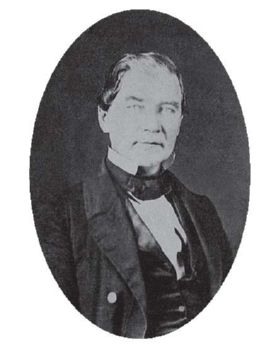
Nominee	Elisha M. Pease	David C. Dickson
Party	Democratic	American
Popular vote	26,336	18,968
Percentage	56.83%	40.93%
Results by County
Pease
40–50%
50–60%
60–70%
70–80%
80–90%
>90%
Dickinson
40–50%
50–60%
60–70%
70–80%
80–90%
>90%
Unknown/No Vote
Governor before election
Elisha M. Pease
Democratic
Elected Governor
Elisha M. Pease
Democratic

The 1855 Texas gubernatorial election was held on August 6, 1855, to elect the governor of Texas. Incumbent Governor Elisha M. Pease was reelected to a second term, winning 57% of the vote.

== Background ==
Starting in 1854, the nativist American Party, also known as the "Know Nothings" surged in national popularity. Texas up to this point had been dominated by the Democratic party, but the Know Nothings did see some success on the municipal level in San Antonio and Galveston.

Democrats were disjointed going into the election, and when the party organized a convention only delegates from twelve counties were able to attend. Given the small number of delegates, the convention refused to make official nominations, but did "respectfully suggest the reelection of the present incumbents".

Meanwhile, the leaders of the Texas Know Nothings saw an opportunity to build on their momentum and take control of the state from the Democratic Party, by secretly converting Democratic leadership to their cause. Posing as a river improvement convention in June 1855, a surprise nominating convention was held in which they announced a full slate of candidates for congressional and statewide tickets. Leading this ticket was the incumbent lieutenant governor, David Catchings Dickson, who had secretly joined the party to challenge the incumbent governor Elisha M. Pease.

Word of the Know Nothing convention swept the state, alarming the Democratic party and prompting a "Bomb Shell" convention which met on June 16. This convention reiterated its support for Pease in the governor's race and dropped all support for Dickson. They passed resolutions which declared the Know Nothing Party as "an enemy of the government" and denounced anyone who was a member of a secret political faction.

In addition to the debates around immigration the campaign also discussed the internal improvements advocated by the Pease administration which were unpopular in some parts of the state, and especially in East Texas as residents there felt they were paying for the bulk of the price.

== General election ==
On August 6, 1855, Pease was reelected with nearly 57% of the popular vote. The Know Nothings had their strongest performances in Central Texas around Travis County. The legislature certified the election results on November 7, 1855.

=== Candidates ===
- David C. Dickson, Lieutenant Governor of Texas, former Speaker of the Texas House of Representatives, former justice of the peace, former surgeon in the Army of the Republic of Texas (American)
- Middleton T. Johnson, unsuccessful candidate for lieutenant governor in 1849 and governor in 1851, Texas Ranger and militia leader, former representative in Alabama House of Representatives (Democratic)
- Elisha M. Pease, incumbent governor, former state senator, former Comptroller of Public Accounts of the Republic of Texas (Democratic)
- George Tyler Wood, former governor (1847-1849), plantation owner, veteran of the Mexican-American War (Democratic)

=== Results ===
1855 Texas gubernatorial election
Party	Candidate	Votes	%
Democratic	Elisha M. Pease (incumbent)	26,336	56.83%
Know Nothing	David C. Dickson	18,968	40.93%
Democratic	Middleton T. Johnson	809	1.75%
Democratic	George Tyler Wood	226	0.49%
Total votes		46,339	100.00%
Democratic hold			
