= 1866 Texas gubernatorial election =

- June 25, 1866
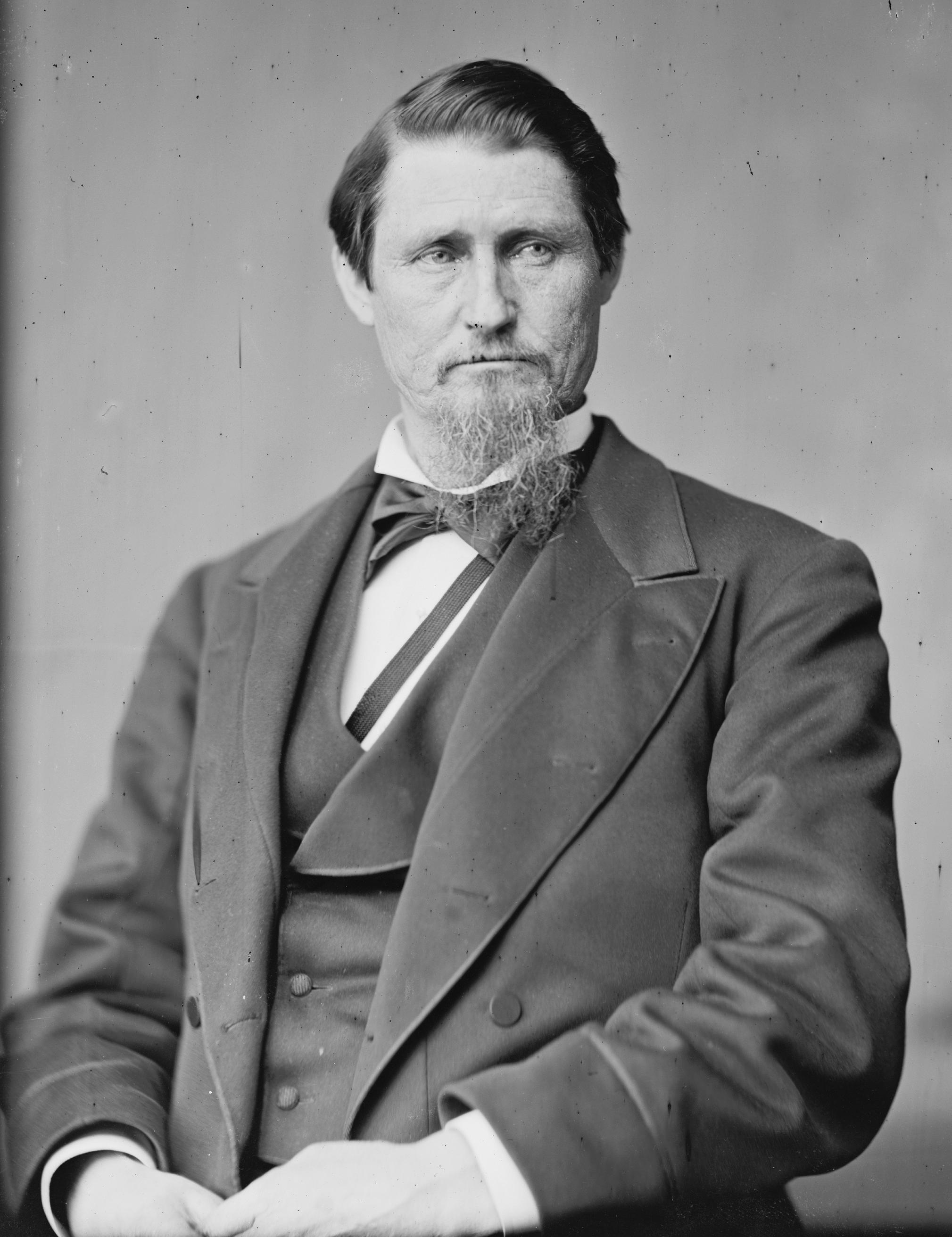

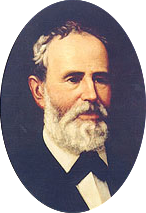
Candidate	James W. Throckmorton	Elisha M. Pease
Party	Democratic	Republican
Popular vote	48,631	12,051
Percentage	80.13%	19.86%
- County results Throckmorton: 50–60% 60–70% 70–80% 80–90% 90–100% Pease: 50–60% 60–70% 70–80% 80–90% 90–100% No Data/Vote
Governor before election
Andrew J. Hamilton
Union
Elected Governor
James W. Throckmorton
Democratic

The 1866 Texas gubernatorial election was held on June 25, 1866, to elect the governor of Texas. Incumbent Governor Andrew J. Hamilton, who had been appointed by President Andrew Johnson, did not run for a full term. The election was won by James W. Throckmorton, who received 80% of the vote.

== General election ==
This was the first statewide election in Texas following the end of the American Civil War. Members of the Confederate administration of the state had either fled to Mexico or had been removed from office by military officials and replaced by some, like Andrew Hamilton, to lead the state on an interim basis. The election was held concurrently with a vote on the ratification of the newly drafted state Constitution of 1866. The document abolished slavery in the state, as it was a condition of readmittance to the Union, and protected their property and legal rights, but still barred freedmen from participation in the political sphere. The document also lengthened the term of the governor and lieutenant governor from two years to four years.

=== Results ===
1866 Texas gubernatorial election
Party	Candidate	Votes	%
Democratic	James W. Throckmorton	48,631	80.13%
Republican	Elisha M. Pease	12,051	19.86%
Write-in		6	0.01%
Total votes		60,688	100.00%

== Aftermath ==
While the Constitution of 1866 was adopted by the people by a vote of 28,119 to 23,400, Congress did not approve of the document as Radical Republicans did not believe the document went far enough with incorporating and expanding the rights of freedmen. In 1867, the southern states would be placed under martial law in the form of five military districts. In March 1867, General Philip H. Sheridan was appointed military governor of the Fifth Military District. Citing the "impediment" Throckmorton presented "to the reconstruction of the State," Sheridan removed him from office and appointed Pease governor on July 30, 1867.
