= Albert H. Latimer =

American judge (c. 1800–1877)

Albert Hamilton Latimer (May 25, c. 1800 – January 27, 1877) was a justice of the Texas Supreme Court from September 1867 to November 1869.

Born in Huntingdon, Tennessee, Latimer gained admission to the bar in Tennessee in 1831, and moved to Texas with family in 1833. The family settled near what would later become Clarksville in Red River County.

Latimer was a delegate to the Convention of 1836 in Washington-on-the-Brazos, Texas, in which Texas declared independence from Mexico, which declaration Latimer signed. Learning of General Santa Anna's attack on the Alamo, Latimer turned for his home. Along the way, he confronted a Cherokee band, who turned out to be friendly, and let him pass. He served in the Republic of Texas House of Representatives from 1840 to 1842, as a delegate to the Statehood Convention of 1845, and in the Texas State Senate from 1849 to 1851.

Latimer, too old to fight during the American Civil War, "was vocal in his opposition to Texas' secession from the Union". He joined the Republican Party, and in October 1865 he was appointed state comptroller, during Reconstruction, by Provisional Governor Andrew Jackson Hamilton. Latimer then served stints as a federal tax commissioner overseeing revenue collection for North Texas, and supervisor of voter registration for North Texas. He was also a commissioner with the Freedman's Bureau, until his appointment to the Texas Supreme Court, in 1867, one of several anti-secessionist justices appointed.

Latimer served until his resignation from the court in November 1869, later serving as a district judge of the Eighth Judicial District from 1870 to 1872.

Latimer died in Clarksville, and was buried in Clarksville Cemetery.

Political offices
Preceded by Newly constituted court	Justice of the Texas Supreme Court; 1867–1869	Succeeded by Moses B. Walker
