= James W. Henderson =

Governor of Texas in 1853

James Wilson Henderson
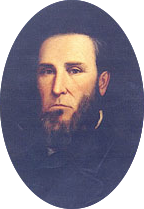

4th Governor of Texas
- In office November 23, 1853 – December 21, 1853
- Lieutenant: Vacant
- Preceded by: Peter Hansborough Bell
- Succeeded by: Elisha M. Pease

3rd Lieutenant Governor of Texas
- In office December 22, 1851 – November 23, 1853
- Governor: Peter Hansborough Bell
- Preceded by: John Alexander Greer
- Succeeded by: David Catchings Dickson

7th Speaker of the Texas House of Representatives
- In office December 13, 1847 – November 5, 1849
- Preceded by: Stephen W. Perkins
- Succeeded by: Charles G. Keenan

Member of the Texas House of Representatives
- In office December 13, 1847 – November 5, 1849
- In office November 2, 1857 – November 4, 1861

Member of the Republic of Texas House of Representatives
- In office 1843–1845

Personal details
- Born: August 15, 1817 Sumner County, Tennessee, U.S.
- Died: August 30, 1880 (aged 63) Houston, Texas, U.S.
- Party: Democratic
- Spouse(s): Laura A. Hooker (m. 1848; died 1856) Saphira Elizabeth Price (m. 1858)

Military service
- Allegiance: Confederate States
- Branch/service: Confederate States Army
- Rank: Captain
- Battles/wars: American Civil War

James Wilson Henderson (August 15, 1817 – August 30, 1880) was an American surveyor and politician who served as the fourth governor of Texas from November to December 1853.

== Biography ==
Born on August 15, 1817, in Sumner County, Tennessee, Henderson moved to Texas when he was 19 to join the struggle for independence, but he arrived too late to participate. He settled in Harris County and became the county surveyor, also studying law. In 1842, he enlisted in the Somervelle Expedition.

In 1843, he was elected to the Texas House of Representatives, and in 1847, became Speaker of the House. He was elected Lieutenant Governor on August 4, 1851, and was inaugurated on December 21. He became the fourth governor of Texas on November 23, 1853, upon the resignation of his predecessor, Peter Hansborough Bell, serving the last 28 days of his term.

During the Civil War, he joined the Confederate Army as a captain under General John B. Magruder. In 1871, Henderson was vice president of the state Democratic Convention. He died on August 30, 1880, at the age of 63, in Houston.

Texas House of Representatives
Preceded by None	Member of the Texas House of Representatives; 1846–1849	Succeeded by unknown
Preceded by unknown	Member of the Texas House of Representatives; 1857–1859	Succeeded by unknown
Political offices
Preceded by Stephen W. Perkins	Speaker of the Texas House of Representatives; 1847–1849	Succeeded by Charles G. Keenan
Preceded by John Alexander Greer	Lieutenant Governor of Texas; 1851–1853	Succeeded by David Catchings Dickson
Preceded by Peter Hansborough Bell	Governor of Texas; 1853	Succeeded by Elisha M. Pease
