= Henry Kinney =

American politician and military officer (1814–1862)

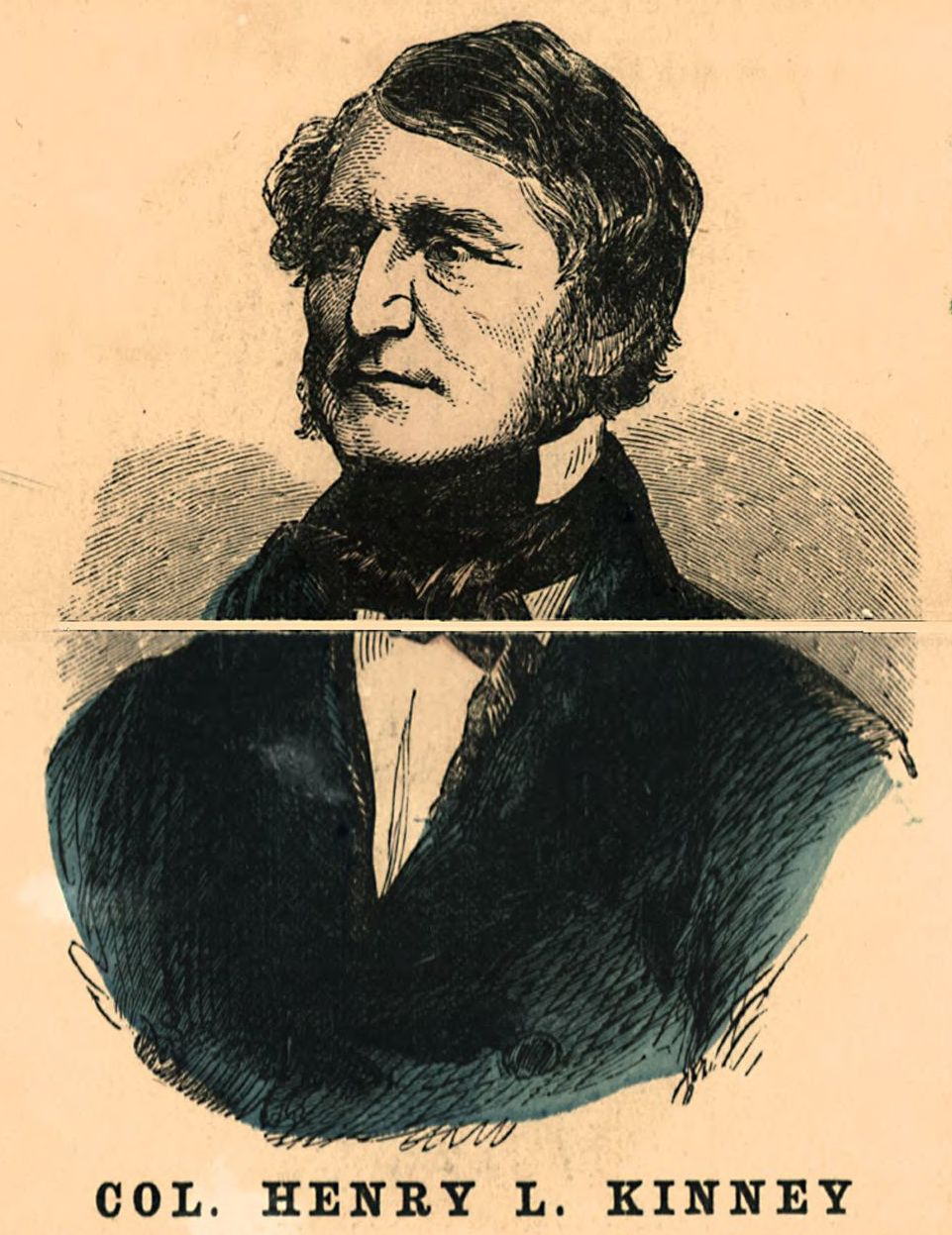

Personal details
- Born: Henry Lawrence Kinney; June 3, 1814 near Sheshequin, Pennsylvania, U.S.
- Died: March 3, 1862 (aged 47) Matamoros, Tamaulipas, Mexico
- Spouse: Mary B. Herbert (m. 1850)
- Occupation: Politician; military officer

Military service
- Allegiance: United States
- Years of service: 1846–1848
- Battles/wars: Mexican–American War

Henry Lawrence Kinney (June 3, 1814 – March 3, 1862) was an American politician, military officer, and later filibuster known for founding what became the city of Corpus Christi, Texas. Born in Pennsylvania, Kinney moved to Texas in 1838 and settled near present-day Brownsville. He served in both houses of the Texas Legislature.

== Early life ==
Henry Lawrence Kinney was born June 3, 1814 in near Sheshequin, Pennsylvania.

== Corpus Christi ==
By 1841, Kinney began trading and ranching near what is now Corpus Christi, Texas on a site known as the Old Indian Trading Grounds. In 1844, in San Antonio, he participated in a riding/shooting contest, which included, Texas Rangers, Commanches and Mexican vaqueros. Ranger John McMullen, was awarded the 1st prize, and Kinney was awarded the second prize. He was a noted horseman and kept some of the finest horses in the state. He participated in several skirmishes with Commanches, who often attacked the Corpus Christi area. He was elected as a senator to the Ninth Texas Congress and served as a delegate to the Convention of 1845.

At the beginning of the Mexican–American War, he was on General James Pinckney Henderson's campaign staff, campaigning in northern Mexico. At the end of the war, he returned to the Corpus Christi area and continued trading. Kinney established Corpus Christi as Kinney's Rancho and also established Nuecestown, which is now a ghost town within the city limits of Corpus Christi.

Kinney served in the Senate for the First, Second, Third and Fourth legislatures of the new state of Texas.

== Nicaragua filibuster ==
In 1854, largely financed by New York backers, Kinney purchased millions of acres of land in Nicaragua under dubious legal circumstances with the intent to start a colony. This practice, known as filibustering, was popular in the years before the American Civil War, both as a means of carrying out the nation's so-called manifest destiny and, in some cases, as a tactic to expand U.S. territory in which slavery was permitted. Also fueling popular support for American filibusters was Britain's domination of the eastern coast of Central America—Mosquitia. In February 1855, Kinney was warned that his proposed colony might violate the U.S. Neutrality Act of 1794. In April, he and fellow filibuster Joseph W. Fabens were arrested in New York and their vessel blockaded by the U.S. Navy at its East River wharf. Released on bail, Kinney slipped out of New York and traveled to Nicaragua.

On August 17, Kinney wrote to a friend: "I am at last on Central American soil with 100 men and more. This is a beautiful place and is to be the principal of the world. My force will be augmented in three weeks to 2,000 men, when I shall move up country. I have a larger space to act in than I had at Corpus Christi and the result of my undertakings in Central America can hardly be imagined."

Kinney's followers elected him governor. By his own authority, he could raise armies and establish martial law. He appointed a Cabinet, flew his own flag, and established a newspaper called The Central American. With a handful of followers he launched a failed revolt against the Nicaraguan government and the regime of fellow American William Walker, a more successful filibuster who, after supporting the Democrats against the Legitimists in Nicaragua's civil war, took power himself. Opposed by both the U.S. and Nicaraguan governments, as well as shipping tycoon Cornelius Vanderbilt, Kinney soon gave up his dream. In February 1856, Walker—now head of state—annexed all of Kinney's domain for Nicaragua.

== Seminole War ==
Kinney began using the title "Colonel" after claiming to have earned it during the Seminole War in Florida, but there is no evidence that he took part in that conflict. He may have been inspired by "Colonel" Walker, who progressed to "General" when his accession to power made him commander-in-chief of Nicaragua's armed forces.

== Personal life ==
In 1850, he married Mary B. Herbert, a widow who had several children. The marriage, however, proved to be an unhappy, in part because of Kinney's decision to legitimize his illegitimate daughter-and Mrs. Kinney took her children and settled in Galveston.

== Death and legacy ==
He was killed in a gunfight in Matamoros, Tamaulipas, Mexico on March 3, 1862. Kinney County, Texas is named for him.
