= William Fields (politician) =

American politician

Member of the Texas House of Representatives
- In office December 13, 1847 – November 5, 1855
- Preceded by: [data missing]
- Succeeded by: Charles Lander Cleveland
- Constituency: Liberty (1847–1849); 24th district (1849–1851); 2nd district (1851–1853); 33rd district (1853–1855)

Personal details
- Born: 1810 North Carolina, U.S.
- Died: September 9, 1858 (aged 47–48) Hempstead, Texas, U.S.
- Children: 5

William Fields (1810 – September 9, 1858) was an American politician and author who served in the Texas House of Representatives from 1847 to 1855.

== Life ==
Fields was born in North Carolina in 1810. In 1837, after having lived in Tennessee and publishing Fields' Scrap Book, he moved to Liberty County, Texas. After a short while, Fields moved to Galveston County, before moving back to Liberty in 1842. He married and had 5 children.

=== Politics and later life ===
Fields served in the Texas House of Representatives for four terms. He represented the Liberty district from 1847 to 1849, the 24th district from 1849 to 1851, the 2nd district from 1851 to 1853, and the 33rd district from 1853 to 1855.

Fields died in Hempstead, Texas on September 6, 1858. He was interred at Galveston.
