= Adolphus Sterne =

Texas pioneer

Member of the Texas House of Representatives House of Representatives
- In office 1847–1851

Personal details
- Born: Nicholas Adolphus Sterne; April 5, 1801 Cologne, Germany
- Died: March 27, 1852 (aged 50) New Orleans, Louisiana, U.S.

Nicholas Adolphus Sterne (April 5, 1801 – March 27, 1852) served three terms in the Texas House of Representatives and one term in the Texas State Senate. He immigrated to the United States from Germany in 1817, living in Louisiana for ten years. In 1826, he moved to Nacogdoches, Texas, where he operated a mercantile and smuggled weapons for the colonist who wished to rebel against Mexico. His position as a Freemason helped save him from a death sentence, and Sterne went on to finance the two companies of men known as the New Orleans Greys, to assist in fighting in the Texas Revolution.

== Early years ==
Adolphus Sterne, the eldest son of Emmanuel Sterne and his second wife, Helen, was born on April 5, 1801, in Cologne, although Alsace is also claimed as his birthplace. The elder Sterne was an Orthodox Jew, and Helen Sterne was a Lutheran. Sterne grew up amid turmoil. At sixteen he was working in a passport office when he learned that he was going to be conscripted for military service, forged a passport for himself, and immigrated to the United States. He landed in New Orleans in 1817, found mercantile employment, and studied law.

== Moved to Texas ==
In 1826, Sterne moved to Nacogdoches, Texas and established a mercantile business. He was required to swear an oath of loyalty to Mexico, which governed Texas at the time. Despite having given his oath, Sterne soon became involved in the Fredonian Rebellion smuggling guns in coffee barrels. He was arrested and sentenced to death for treason after spies in New Orleans reported his activities. His guards were also Masons and allowed him a great deal of freedom, finally releasing him on the grounds that he never again take up arms against the government.

== Personal life ==
On June 2, 1828, Sterne married Eva Catherine Rosine Ruff, an immigrant from Württemberg, Germany who had also lived in Louisiana. The couple lived in Nacogdoches, where they raised their seven children. Sam Houston lived with them for a time, and was baptized as a Roman Catholic in their parlor, with Eva Sterne serving as his godmother. Sterne was asked to be his godfather but refused because the date coincided with Yom Kippur.

With the assistance of the requirements of Mexican law, Eva succeeded in converting Sterne officially to the Catholic faith, although unofficially he remained a deist.

Sterne also worked as an interpreter in English, French, Spanish, German, Yiddish, Portuguese, and Latin.

== Public service ==
A provisional provincial government was created in Texas in 1835, and Sterne traveled to New Orleans as an agent of that government to recruit an army. He personally financed two companies, later known as the New Orleans Grays. Texas won its independence from Mexico in 1836, and the Republic of Texas was born. Under the Republic, Sterne served briefly as a commander in the militia during the Cherokee War in 1839. In 1840, he became a postmaster at Nacogdoches, and later served as a deputy clerk and associate justice of the county court. The following year he became a justice of the peace.

After Texas was annexed to the United States, Sterne was elected to the Texas House of Representatives, where he served three terms. In 1851 he was elected to the Texas State Senate. He died in New Orleans on March 27, 1852.

== See also ==
- Sterne-Hoya House Museum and Library
