= Hardin Richard Runnels =

Governor of Texas from 1857 to 1859

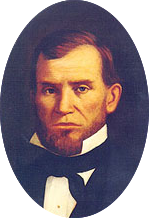

6th Governor of Texas
- In office December 21, 1857 – December 21, 1859
- Lieutenant: Francis Lubbock
- Preceded by: Elisha M. Pease
- Succeeded by: Sam Houston

5th Lieutenant Governor of Texas
- In office December 21, 1855 – December 21, 1857
- Governor: Elisha M. Pease
- Preceded by: David Catchings Dickson
- Succeeded by: Francis Lubbock

10th Speaker of the Texas House of Representatives
- In office November 7, 1853 – November 5, 1855
- Preceded by: David Catchings Dickson
- Succeeded by: Hamilton P. Bee

Member of the Texas House of Representatives
- In office December 13, 1847 – November 21, 1850
- Preceded by: Alexander J. Russell
- Succeeded by: William Fields
- Constituency: Bowie (1847–1849); 2nd district (1849–1850)
- In office November 3, 1851 – November 5, 1855
- Preceded by: James K. Holland
- Succeeded by: Howell Washington Runnels Sr.
- Constituency: 14th district (1851–1853); 1st district (1853–1855)

Personal details
- Born: August 30, 1820 Mississippi, U.S.
- Died: December 25, 1873 (aged 53) Bowie County, Texas, U.S.
- Party: Democratic
- Profession: Politician

Hardin Richard Runnels (August 30, 1820 – December 25, 1873) was an American politician. He was the sixth governor of Texas from 1857 to 1859 and notably was the only person to ever defeat Sam Houston in a political contest. Houston defeated him two years later.

== Early life ==
Runnels was born to Martha "Patsy" Burch (Darden) and Hardin D. Runnels on August 30, 1820 in Mississippi. His father died in 1842, and his mother moved the family to Texas the same year. (Note: Some sources indicate Runnels moved to Texas in 1841.) There Runnels established a cotton plantation in Bowie County along the Red River.

Elected to represent Bowie County in the Texas House of Representatives in 1847, Runnels remained a member of the state legislature through 1854. During his final session, he was speaker of the Texas House. Runnels was elected Lieutenant Governor of Texas in 1855, serving in this capacity during Governor Elisha M. Pease's second term. During his time in the legislature and as Lieutenant Governor, he gained a reputation as a loyal member of the Democratic Party and an advocate for states' rights.

When the Democratic Party held its first convention in Texas in May 1857, Runnels attended as a delegate. Sam Houston had upset many voters with his pro-Union position, association with the Know Nothings during 1855, and his vote against the Kansas–Nebraska Act. As a result, party leaders blocked Houston's nomination for governor, and Runnels was selected instead. Houston, sensing he was unlikely to be reappointed to the U.S. Senate, announced he was running for governor as an independent on May 12, 1857. While states' rights were the primary issue, the resulting campaign quickly became a contest of personalities. Voter anger over Houston's recent political positions continued until election day, and Runnels became the only person to defeat Houston in an election by a vote of 38,552 to 23,628.

== Governor of Texas ==
During Runnels' administration, primary concerns were the slavery issue and safety of settlers in the western frontier. On the slavery issue he signed a bill into law allowing a free Negro to return to slavery by selecting a new master. In addition, he supported reopening the slave trade (banned at the time) and attempted to force the state legislature to go on record supporting its reestablishment. In more general support of southern issues, Runnels repeatedly stated Texas might secede if needed.

On the issue of frontier security, the governor commissioned Colonel John "Rip" Ford as senior captain of the Texas Rangers on January 27, 1858. Ford led the Antelope Hills expedition into the Comancheria, winning the Battle of Antelope Hills in May. Later in the year, the Rangers fought an inconclusive battle in the Rio Grande Valley against Mexican bandit Juan Cortina. The Rangers failed to secure peace on the frontier.

Runnels advocated for reductions in the level of support the state provided railroad companies. He said that the railroads had been slow in fulfilling their contractual obligations.

The Democratic party renominated Runnels for governor during the election of 1859, with Houston again running against him. Runnels received most of the blame for continuing frontier depredations, while Houston had regained his popularity. As a result, Runnels was defeated by Houston by a vote of 33,375 to 27,500.

== Later life ==
After leaving office, Runnels returned to his home and never again ran for elected office. He remained active in politics, serving as a member of both the 1861 Secession Convention and the 1866 Constitutional convention. Runnels died on December 25, 1873, and was buried in a family plot in Bowie County. His remains were re-interred in a state cemetery in Austin in 1929.

Runnels was a slaveholder. In 1860, his net worth was reported at $85,000, and he owned 39 slaves.

== Footnotes ==
Party political offices
| Vacant Title last held by James Pinckney Henderson | Democratic nominee for Governor of Texas; 1857, 1859 | Succeeded by James W. Throckmorton |
Political offices
| Preceded by David Catchings Dickson | Speaker of the Texas House of Representatives; 1853–1855 | Succeeded by Hamilton P. Bee |
| Preceded by David Catchings Dickson | Lieutenant Governor of Texas; 1855–1857 | Succeeded by Francis R. Lubbock |
| Preceded by Elisha M. Pease | Governor of Texas; 1857–1859 | Succeeded by Sam Houston |
