= Texas Legislature =

Legislative branch of the state government of Texas

Texas State Legislature

Type
- Type: Bicameral
- Houses: Senate; House of Representatives

History
- Founded: May 13, 1846
- Preceded by: Congress of the Republic of Texas (1836–1845)

Leadership
- Senate President: Dan Patrick (R) since January 20, 2015
- Senate President pro tempore: Charles Perry (R) since June 2, 2025
- House Speaker: Dustin Burrows (R) since January 14, 2025
- Speaker Pro Tempore: Joe Moody (D) since February 13, 2025

Structure
- Seats: 181; 31 Senators; 150 Representatives
- Senate political groups: Republican (18); Democratic (12); Vacant (1)
- House political groups: Republican (88); Democratic (62)

Elections
- Last Senate election: November 3, 2026
- Last House election: November 3, 2026

Meeting place
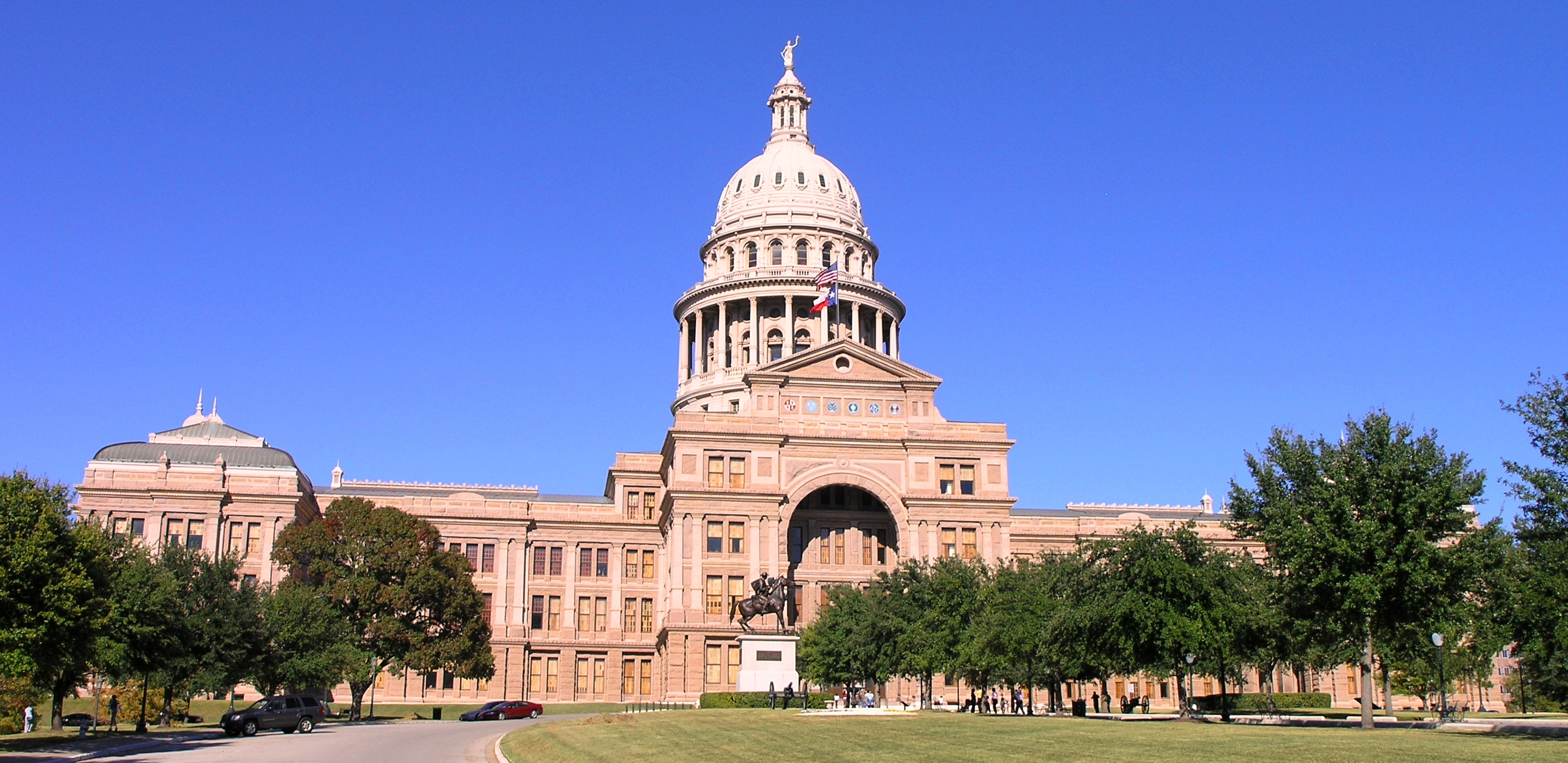
- Texas State Capitol; Austin

Website
- Texas Legislature Online

The Texas State Legislature is the legislative branch of Texas. The Texas Legislature is a bicameral body composed of a 31-member Senate and a 150-member House of Representatives. It meets every two years in regular session, starting on the second Tuesday in January of odd-numbered years, and sessions can last up to 140 days. It’s a powerful part of the Texas government because of its exclusive authority to write law, its control over state spending, its strong connection to the lieutenant governor, and Texas’s plural executive system.

In the 89th Legislature (2025), Republicans hold 88 of the 150 seats in the House and 20 of the 31 seats in the Senate.

== History ==
=== Establishment ===
The Legislature is the constitutional successor of the Congress of the Republic of Texas since Texas's 1845 entrance into the Union. The Legislature held its first regular session from February 16 to May 13, 1846. Under the newly adopted State Constitution, the original memberships in the House was 66 members and the Senate 19 to 33 members. Neither the regular biennial session nor the special sessions of the legislature had limits in duration. In the House, leadership consisted of a Speaker of the House who was elected by and from the membership. In the Senate, the Lieutenant Governor served as President of the Senate. On occasions when the Lieutenant Governor was absent, the senators elected from their members a "president for the time being" (president pro tempore). Like many other southern states at the time, Texas explicitly barred clergy from membership in the legislature. Quorum was defined as 2/3rds of the membership, and it is only one of four states (the others being Indiana, Oregon, and Tennessee) to require a supermajority.

=== Civil War and Reconstruction ===
Following the election of Abraham Lincoln, the Texas legislature was involved in the Secession crisis. There was a campaign for Texas to call a convention to vote on the issue, but only the Governor can call a special session of the legislature. Governor Sam Houston was a unionist and refused. Chief justice of the Texas Supreme Court Oran M. Roberts went around him and began organizing a convention. Houston called a special session in January 1861, hoping to the legislature would declare a secession convention illegal. This backfired and the legislature validated the convention and granted the use of the House of Representatives chamber for such a purpose. The Secession ordinance was overwhelmingly adopted, but unlike other southern states put the issue to a popular vote. The vote on February 23, 1861 approved secession by 44,317 to 13,020. Texas began the process of joining the new Confederate States by making a new Constitution, and in doing so made all officeholders swear a loyalty oath to the Confederacy. Sam Houston refused to do so and the legislature declared the office of governor vacant, effectively removing him from office.

At the conclusion of the Civil War, a new constitution was drafted in 1866. But the legislature refused to ratify the Thirteenth and Fourteenth amendments to the Federal Constitution and Congress placed the state under a military district. In 1869, a new constitution was written by Republicans and expanded the size of the legislature and moved the legislature to annual sessions. The Reconstruction amendments were adopted and Edmund J. Davis as the new governor called the legislature into session for the first time in 5 years. The state struggled during Reconstruction, Governor Davis frequently called martial law and the legislature reflected the chaotic energy and instability of the era. In 1870, the legislature passed a law postponing the date of the next election by a year in violation of the 1869 Constitution. Republican Speaker of the House Ira Evans opposed the law, and for his siding with the Democrats on the issue was removed from his speakership. That same year in the Senate, a group of Democratic senators broke quorum to prevent the passage of legislation creating a state police force and expanding the Governor’s power in declaring martial law. Several of the senators were arrested and told they could no longer vote on bills and one was expelled for allegedly resisting arrest. This led the chamber to known as the “Rump Senate”, a reference to the Rump Parliament of King Charles I. The senate later voted to undo this expulsion, but a special election was held to fill the seat and a replacement was sworn in. This period of time also saw the first African-American members of the legislature elected. Three in the Senate and 32 in the House.

In 1873, Richard Coke was elected governor in a controversial election and Edmund Davis refused to leave office. The State Supreme court ruled the election was unconstitutional because the polls had not been opened long enough, but the ruling was not enforced and militia removed Davis from the Capitol after a brief standoff. United States President Ulysses S. Grant refused to send federal troops to support Davis and Coke was sworn in as Governor. As a white supremacist he worked to undo the changes brought by the Republicans and Reconstruction. This culminated in the Constitution of 1876, which is the current Constitution.

=== 20th Century ===
During the first half of the 20^{th} century, under the new constitution the norms and traditions of the legislature began to be established. The biannual session was reinstated and the legislature grew to its current size of 150 members in the House. The legislature moved into the current Capitol building in 1888. In the Senate, instead of electing a president pro tempore only when the Lieutenant governor was absent, an election was held regularly at the start of every session to fill the role. Dr. Read Granberry became the first parliamentarian of the House in 1915 and helped to develop its precedents of procedure. In the House a tradition of a speaker only serving a single term became the norm in addition to a tradition that when a candidate won the speakership the other candidates would move to have the Speaker elected unanimously by the body. Notable speakers during this time include Austin Milton Kennedy (1909) who was forced to resign after accusations of improper spending, and Samuel T. Rayburn (1911) who would go on to become the longest serving Speaker of the United States House of Representatives.

==== Jim Crow ====
With the state government “Redeemed” by the end of Reconstruction, Texas became part of the “Solid South” and moved into an era of the Democratic party leading as a single party. From 1874 to 1978 all of Texas’ statewide offices were held by Democrats. From 1881 to 1969 there was never more than a single Republican in the Senate and it wasn’t until 1973 that there were more than 10 Republicans serving in the House. Due to this total domination over the political process, the Democratic Primary was effectively the only election of consequence. Like the rest of the south, Texas had also instituted legal segregation and Jim Crow laws against the African American population. Robert Lloyd Smith’s election in 1896 was the last African American to serve in the state House until 1966.

Prominent practices that developed during this era to limit African American participation in the legislative process were the poll tax, literacy tests, and the White primary. Starting in 1923, the legislature passed a law that prevented black voters from participating in the primary election. As the only election of consequence this effectively disenfranchised all black voters. The legality of the white primary was challenged multiple times on constitutional grounds and it was eventually ended by the 1944 Supreme Court Case Smith v. Allwright.

Mexican Americans were also the subjects of discrimination in Texas, and were often the victims of violence and lynching. This violence peaked in the 1910s during an era known as La Matanza (the massacre). This violence was often conducted by or with the implicit consent of local government authorities, including the Texas Rangers. In 1919, state representative José Tomás Canales conducted an investigation into the Rangers in response to the Porvenir Massacre which found that up to 5,000 people had been killed by the Rangers during the decade.

During the 1920s, a new iteration of the Ku Klux Klan returned to prominence in the South and found success in the state. At their height in 1922, a majority of the State Legislature were members and Earle Bradford Mayfield was elected to the U.S. Senate by openly seeking the Klan’s support. In 1923, there was a demonstration by robed Klan members in the House Chamber.

==== Progressive Era ====
Texas was heavily involved in the major political movements of the early 1900s such as prohibition and women’s suffrage. Texas held multiple failed referendums to attempt to pass statewide prohibition of alcohol in 1887, 1908, and 1911. The effort did eventually succeed as the state was one of the first to ratify the Eighteenth amendment in 1918 and passed a statewide prohibition law the following year. Prohibition stayed in place in Texas until 1935.

Women’s suffrage had been discussed in the state since a proposal was brought up during the writing of the 1869 state constitution. In 1915 and 1917, a majority of the state House voted in favor of expanding the right to vote but fell short of reaching the 2/3 majority needed for a constitutional amendment. In 1918 a special session was called on the issue and representative Charles B. Metcalfe introduced legislation to allow women to vote in primary elections. This legislation did not need a constitutional amendment and as such was passed. The next year Texas was one of the first states to pass the Nineteenth amendment. In 1922 Edith Wilmans was the first woman elected to the Texas House and in 1927 Margie Elizabeth Neal was the first woman elected to the Senate.

In 1914, James E. Ferguson used his skills as an orator to win election as governor on a populist, anti-prohibition platform. He became a deeply divisive figure and legislative pro and anti-Fergusonian factions emerged. He was reelected in 1916, but soon after was impeached by the State House. He was convicted by the Senate and removed from office and barred from running in the future. He became the first official to be successfully removed in this manner. Ferguson contested his removal on the grounds that he had technically resigned prior to his conviction and as such was still eligible to run for office. His political philosophy influenced the state for decades as he remained active in state politics for many years running for multiple offices including a run for President in 1920 but failing to win any. He entered the 1924 gubernatorial race, but after the state supreme court upheld his ineligibility to run for office, his wife Miriam “Ma” Ferguson ran in his place. She won the race, on the campaign of getting “two governors for the price of one" and became Texas’ first female governor and the second female governor in the country. She lost re election in 1926 to an opponent of her husband, but she was elected to a nonconsecutive second term in 1932.

==== Civil Rights Era ====
Many changes came to the legislature in the second half of the century. The Civil Rights movement and fight to end legal segregation were major political undertakings in the legislature. Texas was at the center of multiple legal cases that worked towards ending segregationist policies including Sweatt v. Painter (1950) which integrated the University of Texas Law School and Hernández v. Texas (1954) which ruled that Jim Crow laws could not apply to Mexican Americans. Following the landmark Brown v. Board of Education (1954) decision, Texas like most of the south moved to resist the orders from the court. Conservative members of the legislature, known as "Shivercrats" for their allegiance to governor Allan Shivers, actively attempted to circumvent desegregation. In 1955, the Texas Advisory Committee on Segregation in Public Schools was formed and produced a 58 page report detailing ways to nominally fulfill the courts orders while preserving the status quo. The legislative package introduced in the next legislative session included items such as removing the mandate of compulsory attendance at integrated schools and providing education vouchers to white parents who wished to send their children to private “segregation academies”. However, most of this legislation was blocked in the state Senate by a 36 hour long filibuster from senators Henry Gonzalez and Abraham “Chick” Kazen. As the Civil Rights era progressed, African American representation returned to the legislature in 1966, including Barbara Jordan who was the first black woman elected to the legislature, and later the first black woman elected to Congress from the south.

==== Legislative Reform and Modernization ====
In 1964, the Supreme Court ruled in Reynolds v. Sims that state senate districts had to be drawn based on equal population which forced the restructuring of the body. A constitutional amendment was proposed to expand the chamber to 39 members but this failed. During this time, several other reforms came to the government such as an annual salary for legislators was set for the first time in 1960 and in 1975 the salary was expanded to its current level. Starting in 1974, the length of the term for the Governor and other statewide officials was extended to four years. This lengthening of term was also reflected in the lengthening of the tenure and influence of the Lieutenant governor and the Speaker of the House. Lt. Governor Bill Hobby Jr. served a record 6 terms from 1973 to 1991 and Speaker Bill Clayton cleanly broke the tradition of the Speaker of the House only serving one or two terms by serving from 1975 to 1983 and he was followed by other long serving speakers Gib Lewis and Pete Laney who both served previously unheard of five terms.

The greatest shakeup to the legislature came during this time as the result of scandal. In 1971, a massive stock-fraud ring was uncovered. Known as the Sharpstown Scandal, it implicated the Speaker Gus Mutcher, Governor Preston Smith, and Lieutenant Governor Ben Barnes. While most of those involved avoided legal punishments, many had their political careers ended with almost half of the legislature being voted out of office due to their connection to the corruption. The fallout of the scandal, and others like "Chicken-gate", resulted in the passage of many ethics, campaign finance, and other “good government” regulations. In 1974, the legislature assembled in a constitutional convention in an attempt to revamp and modernize the nearly 100 year old state constitution, but the new document failed to pass by 3 votes. Later legislatures attempted to incorporate some of the proposed changes into amendments to the current document, such as annual sessions, veto sessions of the legislature, pre-session organizational meetings, term limits on the governor, and increased legislative salaries, but many of those also failed. In 1975, the legislature impeached and removed Judge O. P. Carrillo. In 1979, a group of State senators known as the Killer Bees broke quorum and successfully blocked passage of a bill that would alter the presidential primary in the state. A 1983 fire in the capitol building triggered a complete renovation and expansion of the Capitol complex to better meet the need of the legislators and their staffs, and also provided the opportunity to incorporate modern technologies. In 1991, Glen Maxey became the first openly gay member of the legislature.

=== 21st Century and partisan shift ===
The end of the 20^{th} century saw the weakening of the Democratic Party’s dominance in the state, and the influence of the Republican Party increasingly grew. In 1961, John Tower was elected as the first Republican US senator from the state since Reconstruction. In 1978, Bill Clements was the first Republican elected to the Governor’s office in over 100 years. At the presidential level since 1980 Texas has voted for the Republican presidential candidate after having voted for Democratic candidates in all but 3 elections previously (1972, 1952, and 1928). In the 1990s, more statewide and legislative offices would be won by Republicans. The State Senate has been majority Republican since 1997, the House of Representatives followed suit in 2003. Since 1999 all statewide offices have been held by Republicans.

During this era, the so called “Big Three” of Texas government (the governor, lieutenant governor, and speaker of the house) have increased their influence on their roles in the legislative process. Major events from recent history include three quorum breaks, one in 2021 over voting legislation, and two brought about by mid-decade redistricting (2003, 2025). In 2007, Speaker of the House Tom Craddick, was almost removed from his position over his leadership style in the chamber, but the motion was withdrawn in a controversial manner. In 2023, the Texas House expelled Representative Bryan Slaton in a unanimous vote. This followed the Texas House General Investigating Committee finding that Slaton had violated House Rules by supplying alcohol to a 19-year-old aide before the two had sexual relations at his Austin apartment. Slaton resigned on May 8, 2023, but would have continued receiving his salary and per diem under Texas law unless he was expelled. Also during the 2023 legislative session, the House impeached Attorney General Ken Paxton on charges of bribery and abuse of office. The State Senate would later acquit him of all charges.

The modern Texas Legislature is seen as very conservative, and the major legislation debated by the body is often seen as influencing in the national discourse on culture war issues such as abortion, education vouchers, gambling, LGBT issues, and legalized cannabis.

== Structure and operations ==
The Texas Legislature meets every two years, starting on the second Tuesday in January of each odd-numbered year. It is one of only four states — and the largest — that doesn’t hold annual legislative sessions. Bills may be introduced in either chamber. During a regular session, the first 60 days are reserved for filing legislation and setting up committees. No bills can be passed during this time, unless they have been designated as an "emergency issue" by the governor. Regular sessions last for 140 days, technically they can be shorter but this has not occurred since 1959. The governor also is the only one who can call the Legislature into special sessions. This can be at any time and can last up to 30 days. During a special session, the legislators can only work on the issues the governor orders, though the governor may add more during the session.

Committees play a crucial role in the Texas Legislature. The Speaker of the House and the Lieutenant Governor determine both the members who serve on the committees and which committees legislation is assigned to in their respective chambers, giving them significant influence over what laws advance. There are several types of committees: standing committees handle bills related to specific topics, special committees focus on temporary or unusual issues, and conference committees resolve differences between House and Senate versions of a bill. By reviewing, amending, and voting on bills, committees shape the legislative process and help determine which proposals reach the full chamber. Most bills filed do not receive a vote on the floor, let alone pass; this is either due to them not making it out of the committees or by missing a one of several legislative deadlines.

During years when the legislature is not in session, the Speaker and Lieutenant Governor assign the committees "interim charges". These charges allow the committees to study the effects of legislation and issue reports to the next legislature on any issues facing the state.

Unlike other states, Texas historically has not provided official roles for majority and minority party leaders in the legislature. Traditionally the Speaker and Lieutenant Governor used their discretion to appoint committee chairs in a bipartisan fashion and have even appointed members of the other party to serve as Speaker pro tempore and President pro tempore. However in recent legislatures, there has been a change to prioritize committee chairmanships for members of the majority party. In 2025, following significant pressure from the Republican Party of Texas, the House changed its rules to require all committee chairs to be members of the majority party; additionally, Lieutenant Governor Dan Patrick appointed only Republicans to chair Senate committees. The result was that no members of the minority party served as committee chairs for the first time since 1969.

The Texas Senate allows for the use of a filibuster in its rules. During the filibuster the member must remain standing and is not allowed to leave the floor while discussing the pending legislation. Unlike the federal counterpart, the senator must remain on topic and are only allowed to deviate from the subject of the bill three times before having their speaking ability revoked. The Texas Senate also currently holds the record for the longest solo filibuster on record. Starting on May 2, 1977, Senator Bill Meier spoke for 43 hours. Similar to the filibuster, the Senate also practices a tradition known as a "blocker bill". The bill is placed at the top of the Senate's legislative calendar but is never considered requiring a supermajority (3/5th or 19 of the 31) of senators to move to suspend the regular order of business in order to take up any piece of legislation.

Unlike the Texas Senate, the members of the House of Representatives have limits on the amount of time they can speak on legislation, but they may make periodic extensions to the regular speaking time. In order to delay the passage of legislation in a manner analogous to the filibuster, members will use the full time allowed for debate on unrelated bills which are listed earlier on the calendar in a practice called "chubbing".

Most bills take effect 90 days after passage, but the Legislature can vote to make them effective sooner if two-thirds of both chambers agree. The Legislature may provide for an effective date that is after the 90th day. Most bills are set to take effect on September 1 in odd-numbered years, which marks the start of Texas’ fiscal year.

Many bills can be pre-filed before a session begins, with lower numbers reserved for high-priority bills like HB1 and SB1, which are each chamber’s version of the state budget.

The governor can veto legislation. During a session, the governor has ten days to veto a bill. After a session ends that deadline extends to 20 days. The governor, unlike the U.S. President, also has the power of a line item veto for appropriations. Two-thirds of the legislature can vote to over turn a veto, but since most vetoes are issued after the legislature has adjourned this rarely occurs.

== Qualifications for service ==
The Texas Constitution sets the qualifications for election to each house as follows:

- Half of the Senate membership is elected every two years in even-numbered years, with the exception that all the Senate seats are up for election for the first legislature following the decennial census in order to reflect the newly redrawn districts (this takes place in years ending in "2"). After the initial election, the Senate is divided by lot into two classes, with one class having a re-election after two years and the other having a re-election after four years.
- Representatives are elected for two-year terms. Elections are held in even-numbered years.
- Neither may, for the time they were originally elected, hold any civil office under the State that was created during that term, nor for any such office whose compensation was increased during such time. Furthermore, judges (and their clerks) and any person holding a "lucrative office" under the United States, this State or a foreign government, cannot, while remaining in those offices, be a member of the Legislature; tax collectors and those entrusted with public money must receive a discharge for those funds before they are eligible to the Legislature.

== Salary of legislative officials ==
Legislators earn $600 per month, plus $221 per day while in session which totals about $38,140 for a regular 140-day session and $45,340 over a two-year term. They qualify for a pension after eight years of service, starting at age 60.

== Makeup ==
=== Senate ===
Seal of the Texas State Senate

Affiliation	Members
Republican Party	20
Democratic Party	11
Total	31

Senate Districts and Party Affiliation after the 2024 election Republican Party Democratic Party

=== House of Representatives ===
Seal of the Texas House of Representatives

Affiliation	Members
Republican Party	88
Democratic Party	62
Total	150

House Districts and Party Affiliation after the 2024 election Republican Party Democratic Party

== Support agencies ==
The Texas Legislature oversees seven support agencies that operate within the legislative branch:

- Legislative Budget Board
- Texas Legislative Council
- Legislative Reference Library
- State Auditor
- Sunset Advisory Commission
- House Research Organization
- Senate Research Center

== See also ==
- 2019 Texas property tax reform
- List of Texas state legislatures
