= 1926 Texas gubernatorial election =

- November 2, 1926
- Turnout: 20.5% ▼39.5%
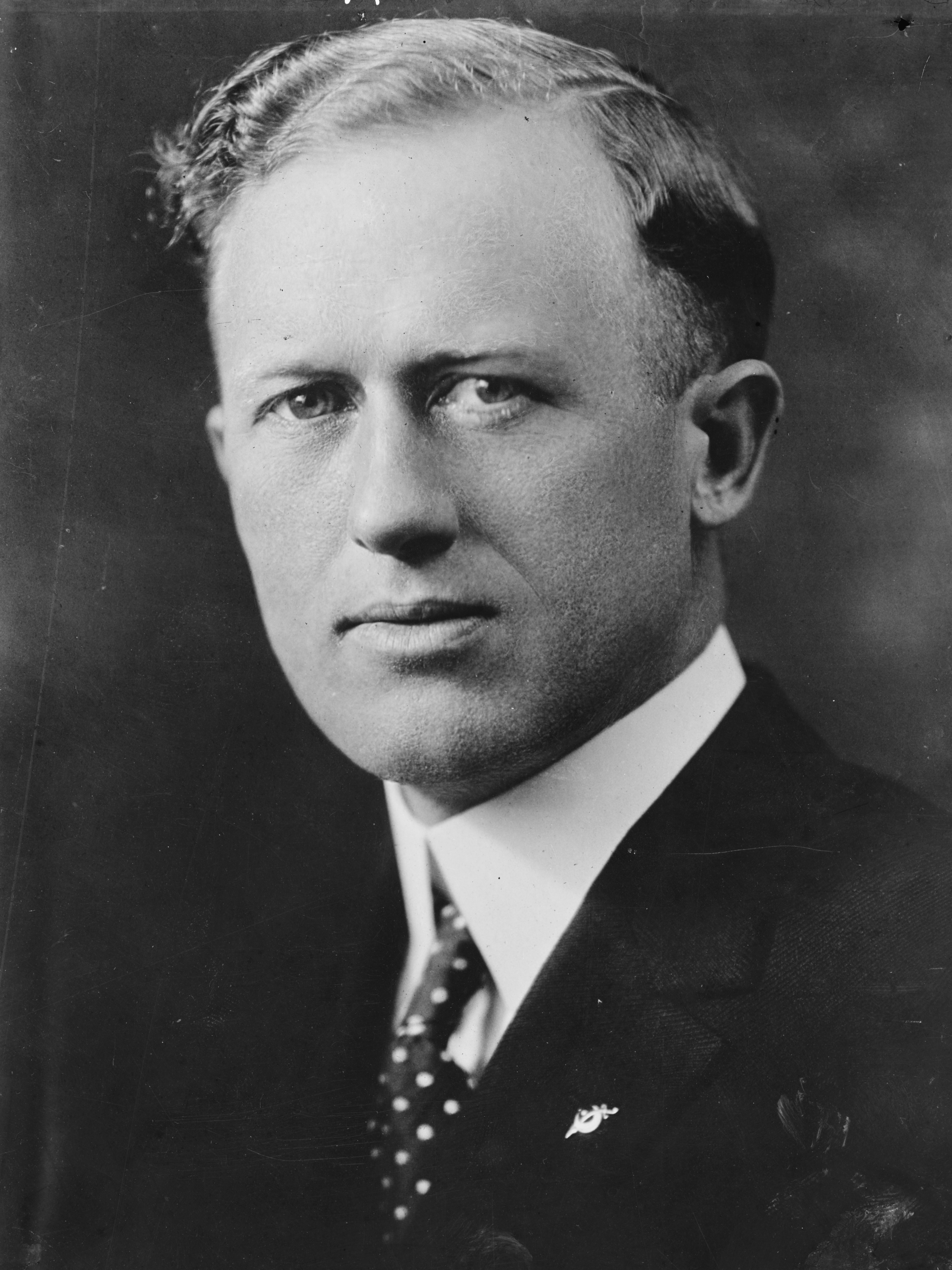

Nominee	Dan Moody	H. H. Haines
Party	Democratic	Republican
Popular vote	233,002	34,819
Percentage	86.75%	12.96%
- County results Moody: 50–60% 60–70% 70–80% 80–90% >90% Holmes: 50–60% 60–70% No votes
Governor before election
Miriam A. Ferguson
Democratic
Elected Governor
Dan Moody
Democratic

The 1926 Texas gubernatorial election was held on November 2, 1926, in order to elect the Governor of Texas. Incumbent Democratic Attorney general of Texas Dan Moody defeated Republican nominee H. H. Haines.

== Democratic primary ==
=== Candidates ===
- Lynch Davidson, former Lieutenant Governor
- Kate Miller Johnston, woman from San Antonio
- Ma Ferguson, incumbent Governor
- Dan Moody, incumbent Attorney General of Texas
- Edith Wilmans, former member of the Texas House of Representatives and first woman elected to the Texas legislature
- O. F. Zimmerman, evangelist from Morris County

The Democratic primary election was held on July 24, 1926. As no candidate won a majority of votes, there was a run-off on August 28, 1926, between the two highest ranking candidates incumbent Governor of Texas Miriam A. Ferguson and incumbent Attorney general of Texas Dan Moody. Moody would eventually win the primary with 64.69% against Ferguson.

=== Results ===
Candidate	First Round		Run-off	
Candidate	Votes	%	Votes	%
Dan Moody	409,732	49.89	495,723	64.69
Miriam A. Ferguson	283,482	34.52	270,595	35.31
Lynch Davidson	122,449	14.91		
O. F. Zimmerman	2,962	0.36		
Edith E. Wilmans	1,580	0.19		
Kate M. Johnston	1,029	0.13		
Total	821,234	100.00	766,318	100.00

== Republican primary ==
After, 1924 Republican nominee George Butte's relatively strong showing, the Republican Party of Texas held its first primary. The primary was between H. H. Haines, who was backed by a faction of the party led by National Committeeman R. B. Creager and E. P. Scott, who was backed by a faction led by Congressman Harry M. Wurzbach. The Republican primary election was held on July 24, 1926. As Haines won a majority of the votes, a run-off was unnecessary.

=== Candidates ===
- Harvey H. Haines (Houston), general manager of the Houston Chamber of Commerce.
- Edward Preston Scott (Corpus Christi), judge.

=== Results ===
Candidate	Votes	%
H. H. Haines	11,215	73.35
E. P. Scott	4,074	26.65
Total	15,289	100.00

== General election ==
On election day, November 2, 1926, Democratic nominee Dan Moody won re-election by a margin of 198,183 votes against his foremost opponent Republican nominee H. H. Haines, thereby retaining Democratic control over the office of Governor. Moody was sworn in as the 30th Governor of Texas on January 18, 1927, at the age of 33, thereby making him the youngest governor in Texas history.

=== Results ===
Texas gubernatorial election, 1926
Party	Candidate	Votes	%
Democratic	Dan Moody	233,002	86.75
Republican	H. H. Haines	34,819	12.96
Socialist	M. A. Smith	786	0.29
Total votes		268,607	100.00
Democratic hold			
