= 1932 Texas gubernatorial election =

- November 8, 1932
- Turnout: 70.3% ▲45.7%
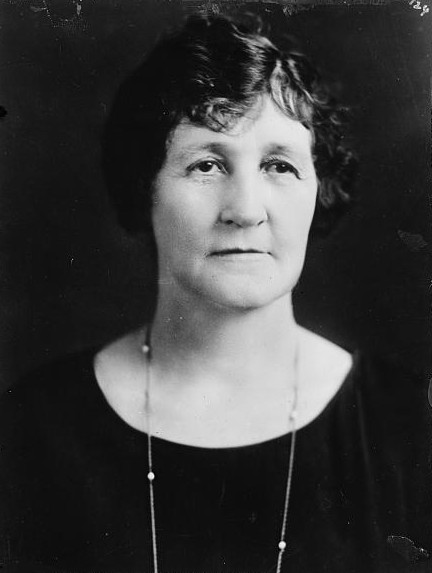

| Nominee | Miriam A. Ferguson | Orville Bullington |
| Party | Democratic | Republican |
| Popular vote | 522,395 | 317,590 |
| Percentage | 61.98% | 37.68% |
- County results (Note: Map only includes the results for Ferguson and Bullington, as other results were not included in the data.); Ferguson: 50–60% 60–70% 70–80% 80–90% >90% Bullington: 50–60% 60–70% 70–80% Tie: 50% No data
Governor before election
Ross S. Sterling
Democratic
Elected Governor
Miriam A. Ferguson
Democratic

The 1932 Texas gubernatorial election was held on November 8, 1932, to elect the governor of Texas. Democratic nominee and former governor of Texas Miriam A. Ferguson defeated Republican nominee Orville Bullington.

== Democratic primary ==
The Democratic primary election was held on July 23, 1932. As no candidate won a majority of votes, there was a run-off on August 27, 1932, between the two highest ranking candidates former governor of Texas Miriam A. Ferguson and incumbent governor of Texas Ross S. Sterling. Ferguson would eventually win the primary with 50.20% against Sterling, which marked the closest primary defeat for an incumbent governor in United States history.

=== Candidates ===
- Roger Q. Evans, San Antonio resident
- Miriam A. Ferguson, former governor of Texas
- C. A. Frakes, Port Arthur resident
- J. Ed Glenn, hitchhiker
- Tom F. Hunter, Wichita Falls attorney
- Frank Putnam, anti-prohibition advocate
- Ross S. Sterling, incumbent governor of Texas
- M. H. Wolfe, former chairman of the Democratic state executive committee and prohibitionist

==== Withdrew ====
- George W. Armstrong, attorney, oilman, and rancher (ran as an Independent)

=== Results ===
First round results by county: Ferguson: 30–40%; 40–50%; 50–60%; 60–70%; 70–80%; Sterling: 20–30%; 30–40%; 40–50%; 50–60%; 60–70%; 70–80%; 80–90%; >90%; Hunter: 30–40%; 40–50%; 50–60%; 60–70%; Hunter-Ferguson Tie: 30–40%

1932 Democratic primary
| Party | Candidate | Votes | % |
|---|---|---|---|
| Democratic | Miriam A. Ferguson | 402,238 | 41.56% |
| Democratic | Ross S. Sterling (incumbent) | 296,383 | 30.62% |
| Democratic | Tom F. Hunter | 220,391 | 22.77% |
| Democratic | M. H. Wolfe | 32,241 | 3.33% |
| Democratic | George W. Armstrong | 5,312 | 0.55% |
| Democratic | Roger Q. Evans | 3,974 | 0.41% |
| Democratic | Frank Putnam | 2,962 | 0.31% |
| Democratic | C. A. Frakes | 2,338 | 0.24% |
| Democratic | J. Ed Glenn | 2,089 | 0.22% |
| Total votes | | 967,928 | 100.0% |

=== Runoff ===
Runoff results by county: Ferguson: 50–60%; 60–70%; 70–80%; 80–90%; Sterling: 50–60%; 60–70%; 70–80%; 80–90%; >90%; Tie: 50%

1932 Democratic primary runoff
| Party | Candidate | Votes | % |
|---|---|---|---|
| Democratic | Miriam A. Ferguson | 477,644 | 50.20% |
| Democratic | Ross S. Sterling (incumbent) | 473,846 | 49.80% |
| Total votes | | 951,490 | 100.0% |

== Republican convention ==
The Republican convention was held on August 9, 1932. In the months leading up to the convention, John F. Grant was seen as the likely nominee. In the days before the convention, a movement to nominate Orville Bullington began to grow. Bullington had not sought the party's nomination, but party leaders thought that he was their strongest candidate and backed him regardless.

=== Candidates ===
- Orville Bullington, attorney, businessman and member of the Texas Republican Executive Committee
- George C. Hopkins, Dallas resident

==== Withdrew ====
- John F. Grant, lumberman

=== Results ===
During the convention, Grant withdrew his candidacy and Bullington was nominated unanimously. In his convention speech, Bullington came out strongly in favor of prohibition and pledged to uphold the Eighteenth Amendment. Bullington's nomination temporarily divided the party, and R. B. Creager threatened to back Grant if he opposed Bullington. Grant, however, chose not to challenge Bullington, thus avoiding a split.

== General election ==
=== Candidates ===
- George W. Armstrong, attorney, oilman, and rancher (Jacksonian Democrat)
- Orville Bullington, attorney, businessman and member of the Texas Republican Executive Committee (Republican)
- George Clifton Edwards (Socialist)
- Miriam A. Ferguson, former governor of Texas (Democratic)
- Otho L. Heitt (Liberty)
- Philip L. Howe (Communist)

=== Campaign ===
Similar to her 1924 campaign, Ferguson's candidacy saw a large number of defections. After his lawsuit to keep Ferguson off of the ballot failed, Democratic incumbent Ross Sterling crossed party lines to endorse Orville Bullington.

=== Results ===
On election day, November 8, 1932, Democratic nominee Miriam A. Ferguson won re-election by a margin of 204,805 votes over Bullington, thereby retaining Democratic control over the office of governor. By contrast, Franklin D. Roosevelt defeated Herbert Hoover by a margin of 662,389 votes in the concurrent presidential election. Ferguson was sworn in as the 32nd governor of Texas on January 17, 1933.

1932 Texas gubernatorial election
| Party | Candidate | Votes | % |
|---|---|---|---|
| Democratic | Miriam A. Ferguson | 522,395 | 61.98% |
| Republican | Orville Bullington | 317,590 | 37.68% |
| Socialist | George Clifton Edwards | 1,873 | 0.22% |
| Independent Democratic | George W. Armstrong | 768 | 0.09% |
| Communist | Philip L. Howe | 138 | 0.02% |
| Liberty | Otho L. Heitt | 134 | 0.01% |
| Total votes | | 843,898 | 100.00% |
| Democratic hold | | | |
