= Dan Moody =

Governor of Texas from 1927 to 1931

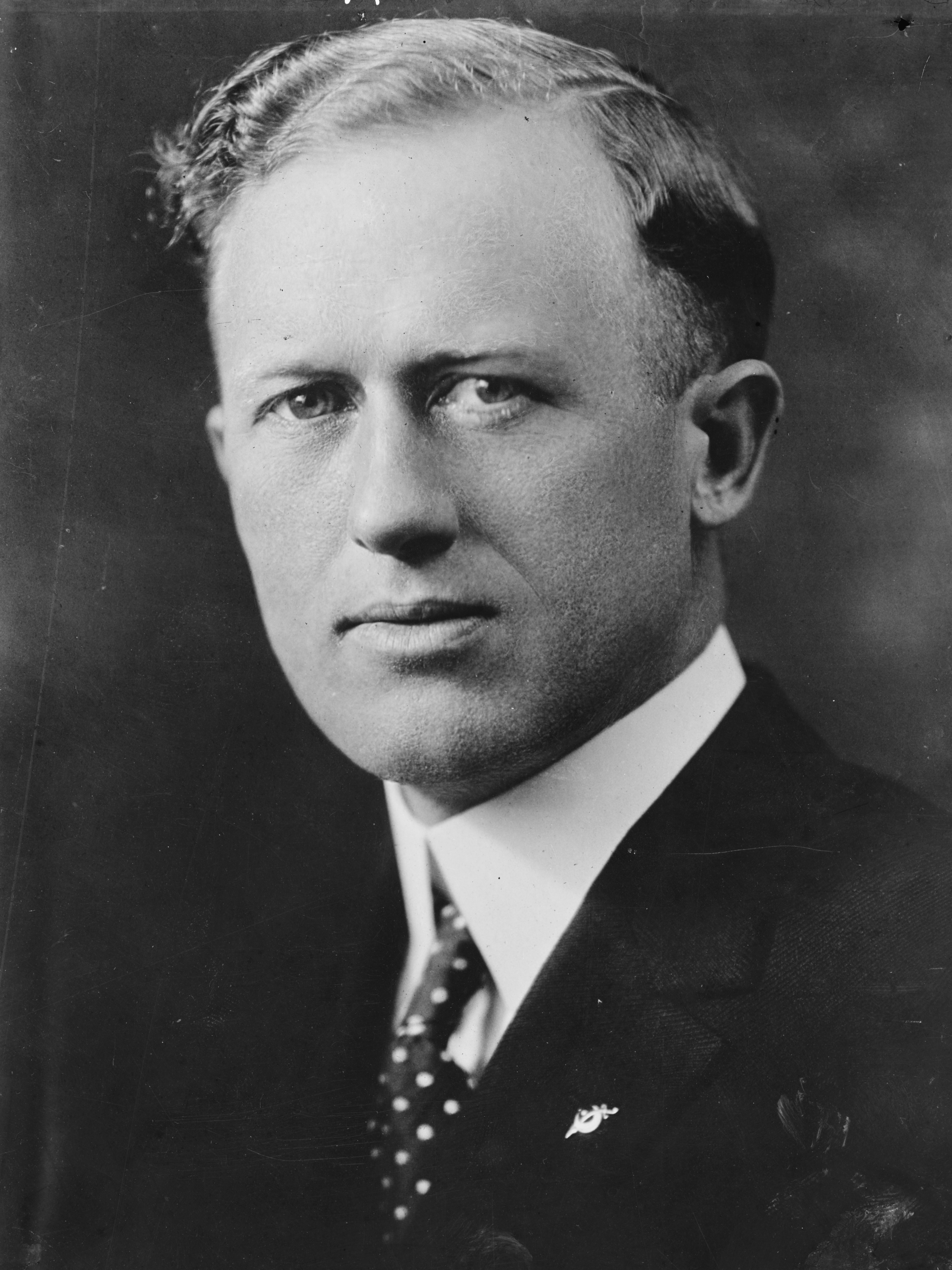

30th Governor of Texas
- In office January 18, 1927 – January 20, 1931
- Lieutenant: Barry Miller
- Preceded by: Miriam A. Ferguson
- Succeeded by: Ross S. Sterling

32nd Attorney General of Texas
- In office January 1925 – January 1927
- Governor: Miriam A. Ferguson
- Preceded by: Walter Angus Keeling
- Succeeded by: Claude Pollard

District Attorney of Williamson County
- In office 1922–1925

Personal details
- Born: Daniel James Moody Jr. June 1, 1893 Taylor, Texas, U.S.
- Died: May 22, 1966 (aged 72) Austin, Texas, U.S.
- Resting place: Texas State Cemetery
- Party: Democratic
- Spouse: Mildred Paxton Moody (m. 1926)
- Education: University of Texas Law School
- Profession: Attorney

Military service
- Allegiance: United States
- Branch/service: United States Army; Texas National Guard
- Rank: 2nd Lieutenant and Captain (Guard); 2nd Lieutenant (Army)
- Battles/wars: World War I

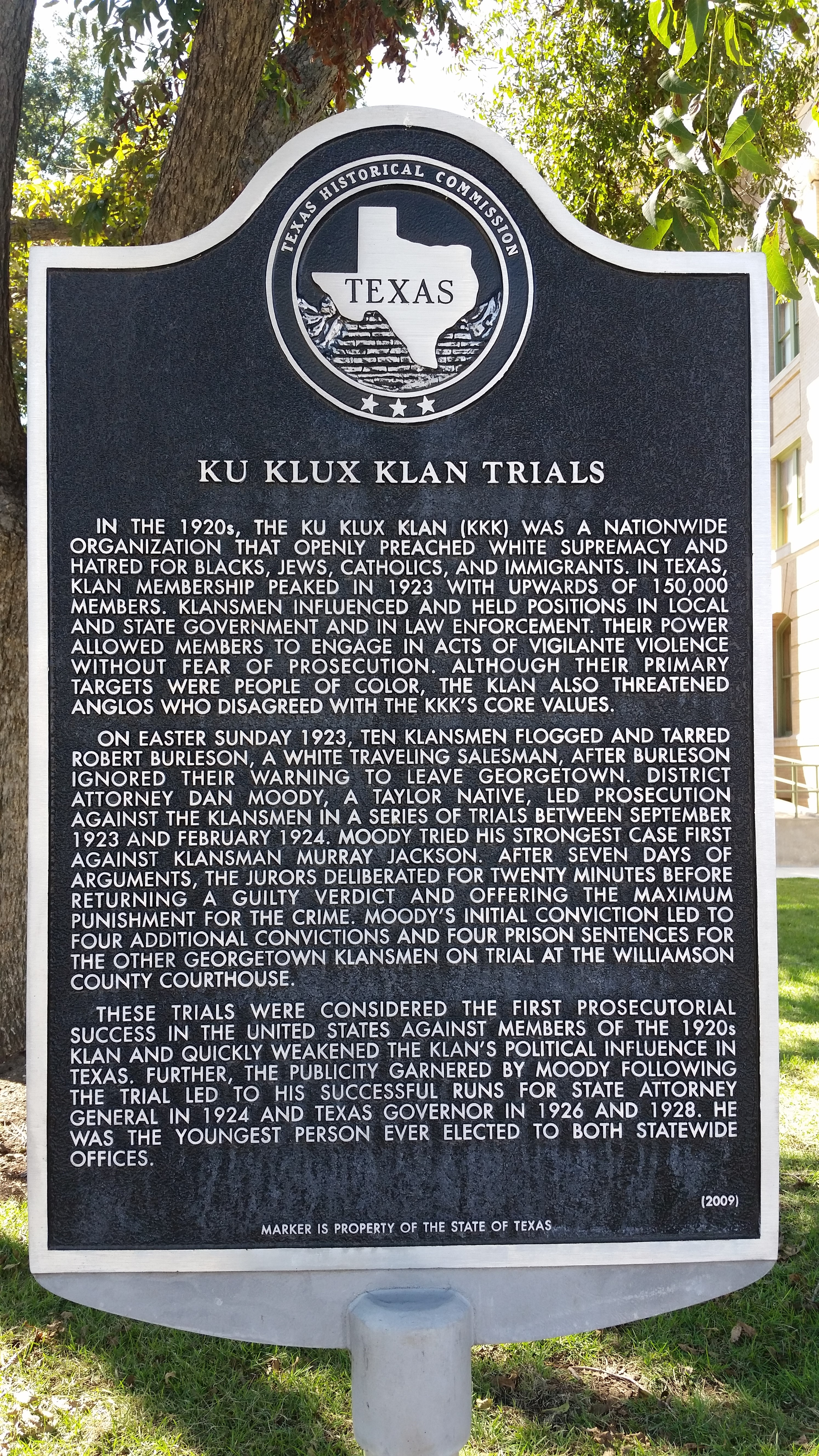
Texas historical marker for the Ku Klux Klan trials. The marker is on the Williamson County Courthouse grounds.

Daniel James Moody Jr. (June 1, 1893 – May 22, 1966), was an American lawyer and conservative Democratic politician. Originally from Taylor, Texas, he served as the 30th governor of Texas between 1927 and 1931. At the age of 33, he was elected. He took office as the youngest governor in Texas history. After his two terms as governor, he returned to private law practice. He continued to prosecute and represent various functions of the US government later in life.

== Early life ==
Moody was born on June 1, 1893, in Taylor, Texas. He was the son of Taylor's mayor, justice of the peace, and school board chairman, Daniel James Moody, who was one of the town's first settlers in 1876. His mother, Nannie Elizabeth Robertson, was a local schoolteacher when Moody married her in 1890. Moody Jr. was an alumnus of the University of Texas Law School and became a member of the State Bar of Texas at 21, in 1914. He began practicing with Harris Melasky in Taylor. During World War I, Moody served in both the Texas National Guard as first a 2nd Lieutenant and then Captain and also in the United States Army as a 2nd Lieutenant.

== Public service ==
In 1920, Moody served as Williamson County Attorney, a position he held for two years before becoming District Attorney in 1922. In 1923, Moody obtained an assault conviction against four members of the Ku Klux Klan for beating and tarring a white traveling salesman. The Texas Historical Commission wrote, "These trials were considered the first prosecutorial success in the United States against the 1920s Klan and quickly weakened the Klan's political influence in Texas." The Klan was very powerful in Texas, with an estimated 150,000 members in the state, including the national imperial wizard. Texas Klansmen included a US senator and Dallas, Fort Worth, and Wichita Falls mayors. The case was widely reported and gave him political momentum despite Klan opposition.

After his election as Texas Attorney General in 1925, Moody conducted investigations of the highly-corrupt James E. Ferguson, whose wife, Miriam A. Ferguson, was serving as the governor of Texas. His investigation recovered $1 million for the taxpayers of Texas. In 1927, Moody defeated her in a runoff election and became the youngest governor of Texas. Suffragists' activism provided a major contribution to her defeat, as they rallied behind Moody and campaigned for him. The activist Jane Y. McCallum, whom Moody would later appoint as his Secretary of State, hosted the campaign headquarters in her own home. She and her colleagues hired a secretary, and they sent "letters, editorials, and pamphlets" to Texas women to ask them to vote for Moody.

A conservative Democrat, he served two terms as governor before he left public office. He opposed the nomination of "wet," Catholic Al Smith in the 1928 presidential primaries, but unlike the Fergusons, he supported Smith against Herbert Hoover in the general election, which saw Texas vote Republican for the first time in its history. Moody supported a reform program of state prisons, roads, and auditing system. In the 1930s, he became a staunch critic of US President Franklin Roosevelt’s New Deal.

== Later life ==
In 1931, Moody resumed private law practice in Austin, Texas, after his last term as governor. A request from President Roosevelt made Moody help to prosecute income tax evasion schemes in Louisiana as a special assistant to the US Attorney General. Moody continued to represent Texas and its executives throughout the 1930s. He entered politics for the last time in 1942 for a Texas seat in the US Senate. Moody came in third in the 1942 Democratic primary for the seat, his only political defeat, behind former Governors W. Lee O'Daniel and James V. Allred. The election was won by O'Daniel. Moody represented Coke R. Stevenson in his case against Lyndon B. Johnson over the hotly-contested 1948 Democratic senatorial primary electoral dispute, and Allred represented Johnson. In the 1950s, despite remaining a Democrat, Moody endorsed the Republican Dwight Eisenhower for president in 1952 and 1956. Moody endorsed the Republican Richard Nixon for president in 1960. He and his wife spent their remaining years in Austin. He died in 1966 and was buried at the Texas State Cemetery.

== Personal life ==
On April 20, 1926, he married Mildred Paxton of Abilene, Texas. The couple had two children, Daniel III and Nancy.

== Legacy ==
The Williamson County Courthouse had the courtroom in which Moody tried his famous case against the Klan completely restored to its 1920s appearance and reopened in 2007. It is free and open to the public in Georgetown, Texas. There is also a statue of Moody installed outside the courthouse.

Party political offices
Preceded by Walter Angus Keeling	Democratic nominee for Texas Attorney General; 1924	Succeeded by Claude Pollard
Preceded by Miriam A. Ferguson	Democratic nominee for Governor of Texas; 1926, 1928	Succeeded by Ross S. Sterling
Legal offices
Preceded by Walter Angus Keeling	Attorney General of Texas; 1925–1927	Succeeded by Claude Pollard
Political offices
Preceded by Miriam A. Ferguson	Governor of Texas; January 17, 1927 – January 20, 1931	Succeeded by Ross S. Sterling
