= Statue of Dan Moody =

Sculpture in Georgetown, Texas

Dan Moody
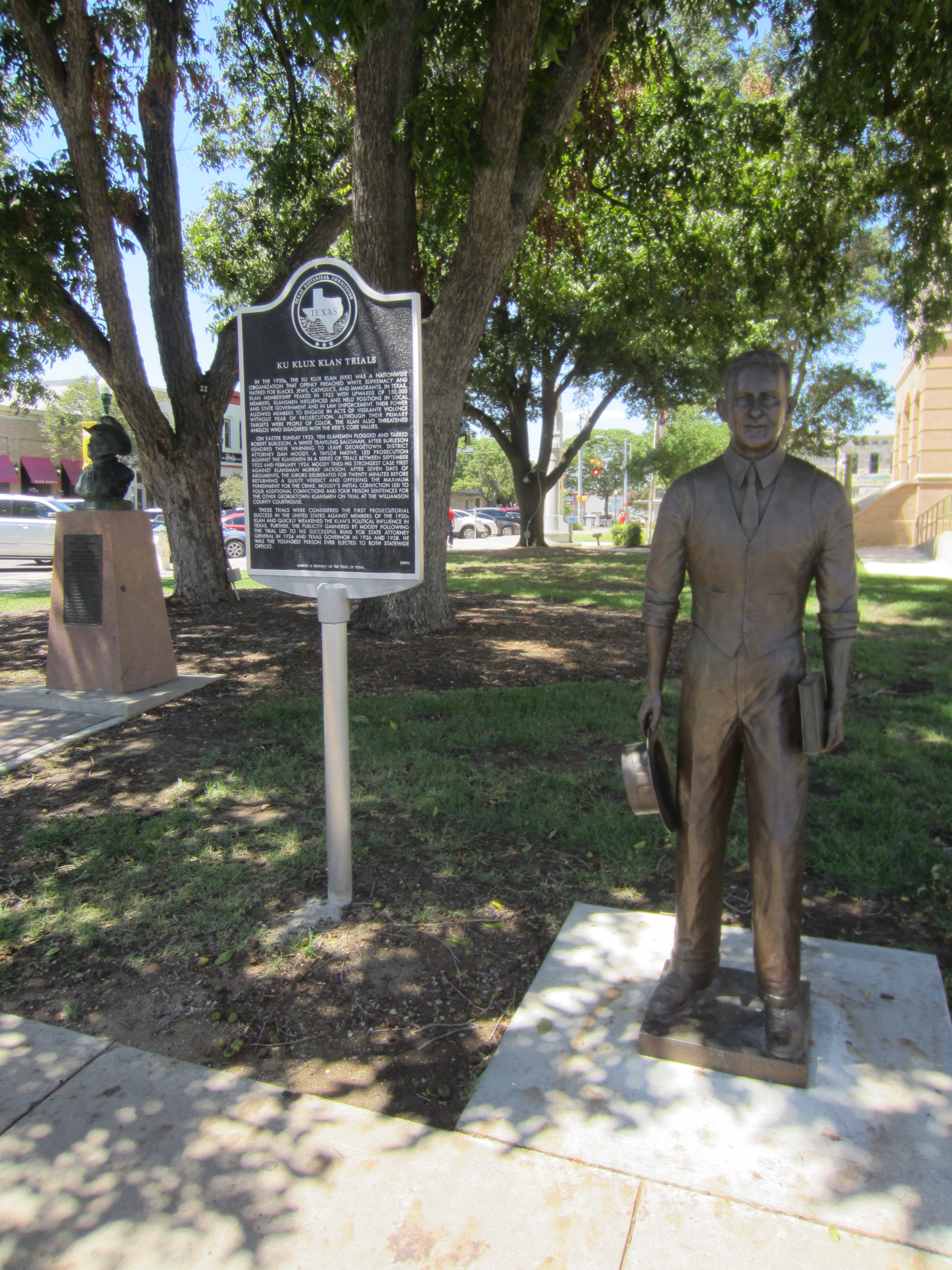
- The statue in 2018
- Artist: Lucas Adams
- Year: 2016
- Subject: Dan Moody
- Location: Georgetown, Texas, United States; 30.636888°N 97.677208°W

Dan Moody is an outdoor sculpture depicting the politician of the same name by Lucas Adams installed outside the Williamson County Courthouse in Georgetown, Texas, United States. The statue was installed on October 14, 2016.

== See also ==
- 2016 in art
