= 2019 Texas property tax reform =

Legislative reform

In May 2019 significant property tax reform bills passed the Texas Legislature, promising property tax relief and higher funding for schools. Senate Bill 2 tackles property tax issues, and House Bill 3 directly deals with school finance reform. House Bill 3 raised the amount per student each district is allotted from $5,140 to $6,030, and also reduces school property tax rates by about four percent per $100 in property value. House Bill 1 is the overall budget for Texas. The tax reduction was achieved by allocating $6.6 billion from the rainy-day fund, leaving an estimated $8.4 billion in two years. In these three bills, the 86th Legislature of Texas increased school funding as well as lowering the burden on property owners.
