= William P. Hobby =

Governor of Texas from 1917 to 1921

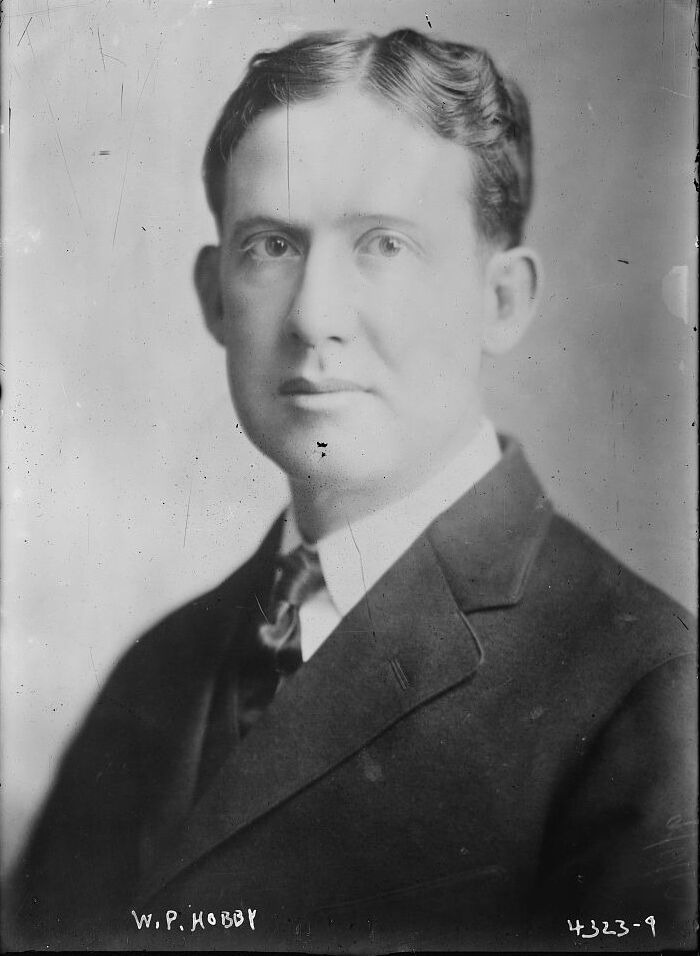

27th Governor of Texas
- In office August 25, 1917 – January 18, 1921
- Lieutenant: Vacant; Willard Arnold Johnson
- Preceded by: James E. Ferguson
- Succeeded by: Pat Morris Neff

24th Lieutenant Governor of Texas
- In office January 19, 1915 – August 25, 1917
- Governor: James E. Ferguson
- Preceded by: William Harding Mayes
- Succeeded by: Willard Arnold Johnson

Personal details
- Born: William Pettus Hobby; March 26, 1878 Moscow, Texas, U.S.
- Died: June 7, 1964 (aged 86) Houston, Texas, U.S.
- Party: Democratic
- Spouses: Willie Cooper (m. 1915; died 1929) Oveta Culp (m. 1931)
- Children: 2, including William Jr.

William Pettus Hobby (March 26, 1878 – June 7, 1964) was an American politician, journalist, and publisher who served as the 27th governor of Texas from 1917 to 1921. A member of the Democratic Party, he served as the 24th lieutenant governor of Texas from 1915 to 1917. Hobby was the publisher and owner of the Beaumont Enterprise when he entered politics and the Democratic Party.

After James E. Ferguson was impeached and forced to resign, Hobby assumed the governorship. In 1918, he won the office in his own right, serving a full term. In 1924, Hobby lost the Democratic primary to Miriam A. Ferguson, wife of "Pa" Ferguson and she was elected to the governorship. Hobby returned to publishing, and in 1924 was chosen as president of the Houston Post. He later served as chairman of the board of the Houston Post Company, which had also acquired radio and TV stations.

A progressive Democrat, Hobby proposed a number of progressive measures during his time as governor such as legislation to provide a minimum wage and to improve housing conditions for renters and tenants.

== Early life ==
Born in 1878 in Moscow, Texas, Hobby attended local public schools.

He started working at the age of 17 as a circulation clerk for the Houston Post in 1895. Several years later, he was promoted to business writer in August 1901. In 1907, he left the Post to become manager and part owner of the Beaumont Enterprise. He acquired the entire paper shortly thereafter.

== Political career ==
Hobby decided to enter politics and joined the Democratic Party. In 1914, he ran for and was elected Lieutenant Governor of Texas. After Governor James Edward Ferguson, known as "Pa" Ferguson, was impeached and forced to resign from office in a corruption case in 1917, Hobby succeeded him at 39 and was then the youngest governor in state history. Ferguson was prohibited from serving in state electoral office again.

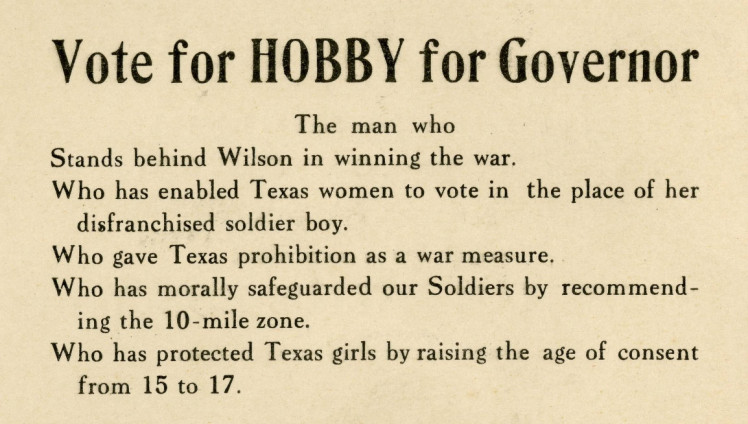
Campaign card for William Pettus Hobby

Hobby soundly defeated Ferguson in the 1918 Democratic primary and won the general election, governorship in his own right, and served a full term to 1921. While serving as governor, various measures were carried out related to (amongst others) drought relief, free school textbooks, state aid for highways and schools, and working conditions, including a measure that provided for the fixing of minimum wage rates.

Hobby aided the propagation of Southern racism and bigotry during his governorship. When the secretary of the National Association for the Advancement of Colored People (NAACP), John R. Shillady, travelled to Texas in 1919 to discuss the accusation that the Association was conducting business in Texas without a state license or charter, he was jumped by six or eight men in morning's light and attacked. Hobby's response to the NAACP's inquiry about justice for Shillady, Hobby responded that the beating was just, that Shillady was the offender, because the NAACP and their "propaganda" was unwelcome in Texas. Hobby followed up with a public speech echoing these same sentiments.

During his years of service, the southern border of Texas was a place of frequent conflict, as revolutionaries from the Mexican Revolution (1910–1920) entered the United States to attack farms, irrigation systems, and railroads. The Texas Rangers, militias, and US troops patrolled the border, and atrocities were committed by both sides.

In early 1919, a Joint Committee of the Texas Senate and House conducted hearings to investigate actions by the Texas Rangers along the border. They conducted hearings for two weeks and had 83 witnesses. Among the incidents recounted was the Porvenir Massacre of January 1918 in West Texas in which militia and Texas Rangers summarily killed 15 Mexican-American men and boys near their farming village. The legislature passed a bill to regulate the Rangers and to professionalize the service, and their numbers were reduced. Historians estimate that the Rangers killed up to 5,000 people, mostly ethnic Mexicans, from 1914 to 1919.

== Publisher ==
After leaving the governorship, Hobby returned to the Beaumont Enterprise. In 1924, he was invited to become the president of the Houston Post. In August 1955, Hobby became chairman of the board of the Houston Post Company. By then, the company also owned the radio station, KPRC, and the television station, KPRC-TV. His wife, Oveta Culp Hobby (see below), served as president and editor.

== Personal and civic life ==
In 1931, Hobby married Oveta Culp. She later was appointed as the first Secretary of the US Department of Health, Education and Welfare (its name was changed after a later reorganization).

Hobby served as a member on the Board of Directors of Texas Technological College.

By the 1930s, Hobby had moved towards conservatism; opposing the liberal policies of the Roosevelt Administration. As Hobby's son later reflected on his father, “Make no mistake-my father was no liberal.”

== Family ==
His son William P. Hobby Jr. also served as lieutenant governor of Texas from 1973 to 1991. His daughter, Jessica, was married to Henry E. Catto Jr., who became the Ambassador of the United States to the Court of St James's. His grandson, Paul Hobby, narrowly lost the election for comptroller of Texas in the 1998 general election. Republican Carole Keeton Strayhorn won that election.

== Legacy ==
Several public facilities were named for him:

- William P. Hobby Airport in Houston, Texas
- Hobby Elementary School in Houston, Texas
- Hobby Middle School in San Antonio, Texas
- Hobby Center For The Performing Arts in Houston, TX

== See also ==
Party political offices
Preceded by James E. Ferguson	Democratic nominee for Governor of Texas; 1918	Succeeded by Pat Morris Neff
Political offices
Preceded by William Harding Mayes	Lieutenant Governor of Texas; January 19, 1915 – August 25, 1917	Succeeded by Willard Arnold Johnson
Preceded by James E. Ferguson	Governor of Texas; August 25, 1917 – January 18, 1921	Succeeded by Pat Morris Neff
