= Willard Arnold Johnson =

American politician (1862–1923)

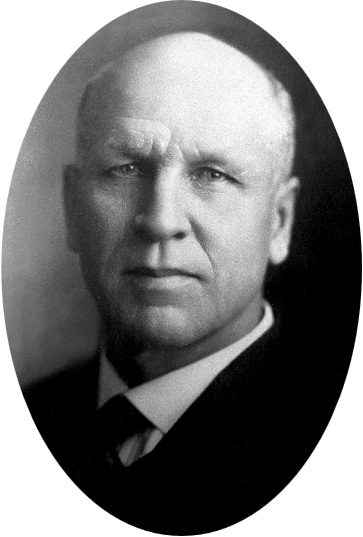
- Johnson in the 1920s

25th Lieutenant Governor of Texas
- In office January 21, 1919 – January 18, 1921
- Governor: William P. Hobby
- Preceded by: William P. Hobby
- Succeeded by: Lynch Davidson

Member of the Texas Senate from the 29th district
- In office January 10, 1911 – January 14, 1919
- Preceded by: John Warren Veale
- Succeeded by: William Stephen Bell

Personal details
- Born: August 28, 1862
- Died: May 5, 1923 (aged 60)
- Party: Democratic
- Education: University of Texas

Willard Arnold Johnson (August 28, 1862 – May 5, 1923) was an American politician who served as the 25th lieutenant governor of Texas from 1919 to 1921 and as a member for the 29th district in the Texas Senate from 1911 to 1919.

== Life and career ==
Johnson attended the University of Texas studying political science and journalism.

In 1911, Johnson was elected to represent 29th district of the Texas Senate, serving until 1919, when Johnson was elected to the Texas lieutenant governorship, serving under Governor William P. Hobby. He served until 1921, when he was succeeded by Lynch Davidson.

Johnson died in May 1923, at the age of 60.

Party political offices
Preceded by William P. Hobby	Democratic nominee for Lieutenant Governor of Texas; 1918	Succeeded by Lynch Davidson
Texas Senate
Preceded by John Warren Veale	Member of the Texas Senate from the 29th district 1911–1919	Succeeded by William Stephen Bell
Political offices
Preceded by William P. Hobby	Lieutenant Governor of Texas; 1919–1921	Succeeded by Lynch Davidson
