= 1924 Texas gubernatorial election =

- November 4, 1924
- Turnout: 60.0% ▲19.9 pp
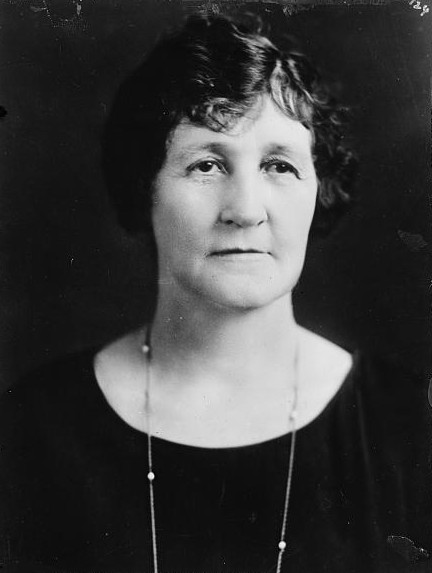

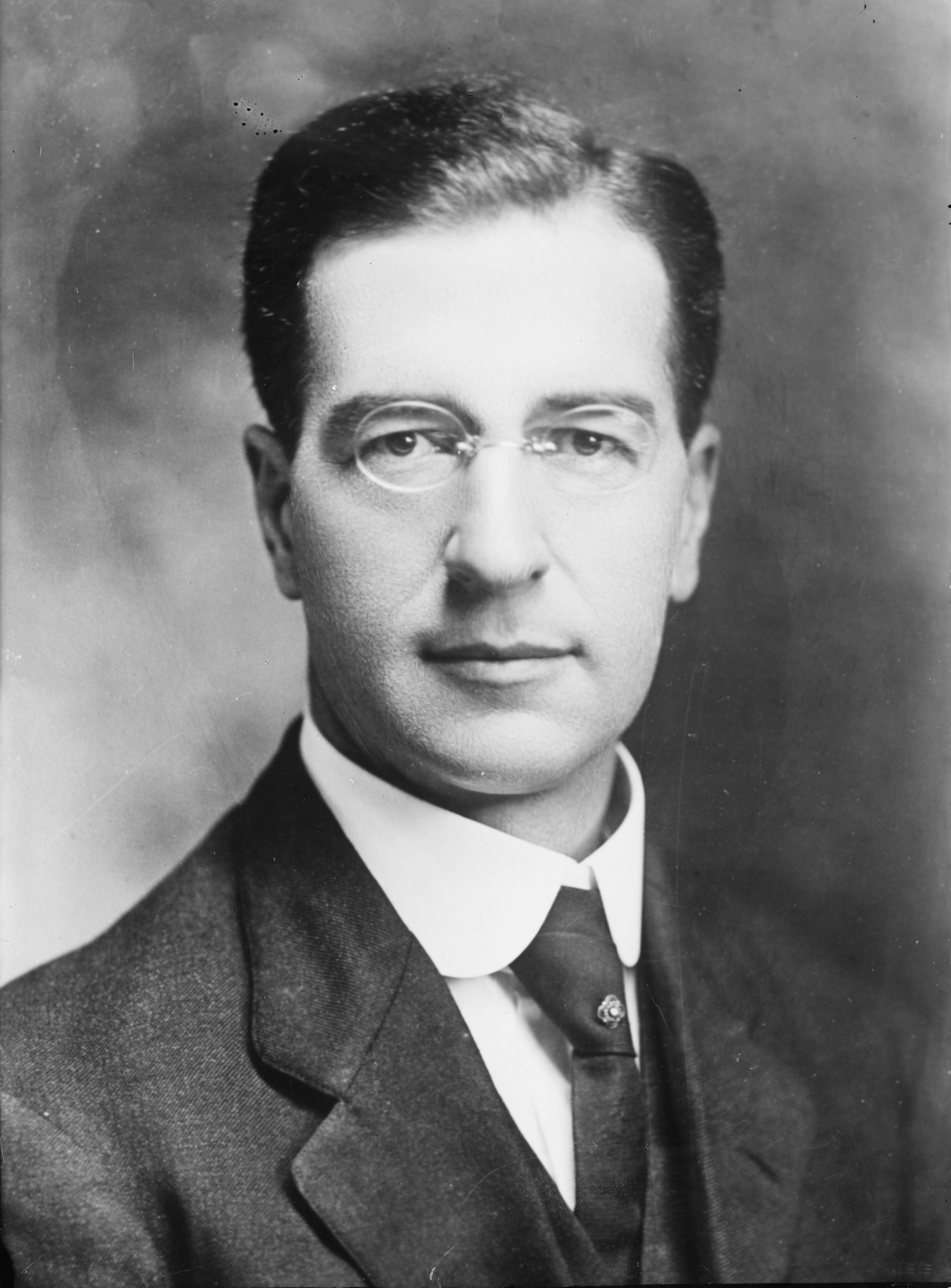
Nominee	Miriam A. Ferguson	George C. Butte
Party	Democratic	Republican
Popular vote	422,558	294,970
Percentage	58.89%	41.11%
- County results Ferguson: 50–60% 60–70% 70–80% 80–90% >90% Butte: 50–60% 60–70% 70–80% Unorganized county No Vote
Governor before election
Pat Morris Neff
Democratic
Elected Governor
Miriam A. Ferguson
Democratic

The 1924 Texas gubernatorial election was held on November 4, 1924, in order to elect the Governor of Texas. Democratic nominee and former First Lady of Texas Miriam A. Ferguson defeated Republican nominee George C. Butte. With her victory, she became the first female governor of Texas and the second to be governor of any U.S. state, after Nellie Tayloe Ross, although Ferguson was the first to be elected to the office.

The election, and more specifically the Democratic primary, was the climax of the conflict within the state's Democratic party over the Klan issue. Miriam A. Ferguson, wife of former impeached governor James E. Ferguson, defeated Klan-backed candidate Felix D. Robertson in the runoff after Lynch Davidson and Thomas Whitfield Davidson divided the anti-Klan/anti-Ferguson vote amongst themselves in the first primary. Miriam "Ma" Ferguson's campaign was run almost entirely by "Pa" Ferguson as a vehicle to return to the governorship after he was barred from public office in 1917. The choice between Ferguson and Robertson in the runoff presented an issue for anti-Klan drys and progressive Democrats, who opposed "Pa" Ferguson for his anti-prohibition stances, his conflict with the University of Texas, and corruption while in office. Most of the anti-Klan faction reluctantly supported "Ma" Ferguson who was viewed as the lesser of two evils.

In the general election Klan forces and disgruntled Democrats backed Republican nominee George C. Butte, although he disavowed the Klan's support. Butte posted unusually high returns for a Republican in Texas, which at the time was a solidly Democratic state. He received 41% of the vote, the highest for a Republican since 1869, and 294,970 raw votes, the highest for a Republican in the state ever up to that point.

== Democratic primary ==
=== Candidates ===
- Thomas D. Barton, incumbent Adjunct General of Texas.
- Joe Burkett, incumbent member of the Texas Senate.
- Vinson Allen Collins, former State Senator and member of the Ku Klux Klan.
- Lynch Davidson, former Lieutenant Governor of Texas.
- Thomas Whitfield Davidson, incumbent Lieutenant Governor of Texas
- George W. Dixon, lawyer and prison reform activist.
- James E. Ferguson, former governor (barred from running)
- Miriam A. Ferguson, former First Lady of Texas
- Walter Edward Pope, former member of the Texas House of Representatives.
- Felix D. Robertson, incumbent Dallas County District Judge and member of the Ku Klux Klan.

=== Primary election ===
Former governor James Ferguson had been impeached and convicted by the state legislature in 1917. Under Texas law this barred Ferguson from running for any office of public trust in the state. However for a variety of reasons, including that he had resigned prior to the final vote of conviction, Ferguson refused to acknowledge the legitimacy of his prohibition to run for office. He had run for reelection in 1918, but lost the primary. He then pivoted to seeking federal office, running for President in 1920, and U. S. Senator in 1922, both were unsuccessful. Ferguson announced that he would again attempt another run for the governorship in 1924 and the majority of the Texas Democratic Party leadership were aligned with Ferguson against the growing influence of the Klan in the state and were willing to put his name on the ballot despite the ban. This move was challenged in court and the State Supreme Court ultimately upheld the validity of the impeachment and the subsequent ban from office in the case Maddox v. Ferguson (1924). The day after the decision was released Ferguson's wife Miram A. Ferguson entered the race on a campaign of "Two governors for the price of one".

The Democratic primary election was held on July 26, 1924. No one candidate received greater than 50% of the vote, so a run-off was held.

1924 Democratic primary
Party	Candidate	Votes	%
Democratic	Felix D. Robertson	193,508	27.52%
Democratic	Miriam Ferguson	146,424	20.82%
Democratic	Lynch Davidson	141,208	20.08%
Democratic	Thomas Davidson	125,011	17.78%
Democratic	Thomas D. Barton	29,217	4.16%
Democratic	Vinson A. Collins	24,864	3.54%
Democratic	Joe Burkett	21,720	3.09%
Democratic	W. E. Pope	17,136	2.44%
Democratic	George W. Dixon	4,035	0.57%
Total votes		703,123	100.00%

=== Runoff election ===
As no candidate won a majority of votes, there was a runoff. The runoff was a proxy battle between pro-Klan political forces backing Klansman Felix Robertson and anti-Klan political forces backing Ma Ferguson. During the runoff, Thomas D. Barton endorsed Ferguson. The election was held August 23, 1924. Ferguson won the primary with 56.70% against Robertson.

=== Results ===
1924 Democratic primary runoff
Party	Candidate	Votes	%
Democratic	Miriam Ferguson	413,751	56.70%
Democratic	Felix D. Robertson	316,019	43.30%
Total votes		729,770	100.00%

== General election ==
The general election saw the Ku Klux Klan back Republican George C. Butte, seeing him as a more acceptable alternative to the anti-Klan Ferguson, despite the state Republican platform's stated "unalterable opposition to the Ku Klux Klan." Additionally, Ferguson saw an unprecedented number of defections from the Democratic Party, notably state legislator and longtime party leader Thomas B. Love. A coalition of anti-Ferguson Democrats and prohibitionists formed the Good Government Democratic League

An atypically close race in then-staunchly Democratic Texas, Butte received 41.11% of the vote to Fergueson's 58.89% of the vote. By contrast, Democratic presidential nominee John W. Davis received 73.70% of the statewide vote in his three-way race against Calvin Coolidge (19.78%) and Robert M. La Follette (6.52%) in the same year. Ferguson was sworn in as the 29th Governor of Texas on January 20, 1925.

=== Results ===
Texas gubernatorial election, 1924
Party	Candidate	Votes	%
Democratic	Miriam A. Ferguson	422,558	58.89
Republican	George C. Butte	294,970	41.11
Total votes		717,528	100.00
Democratic hold			
