= 1916 Texas gubernatorial election =

- November 7, 1916
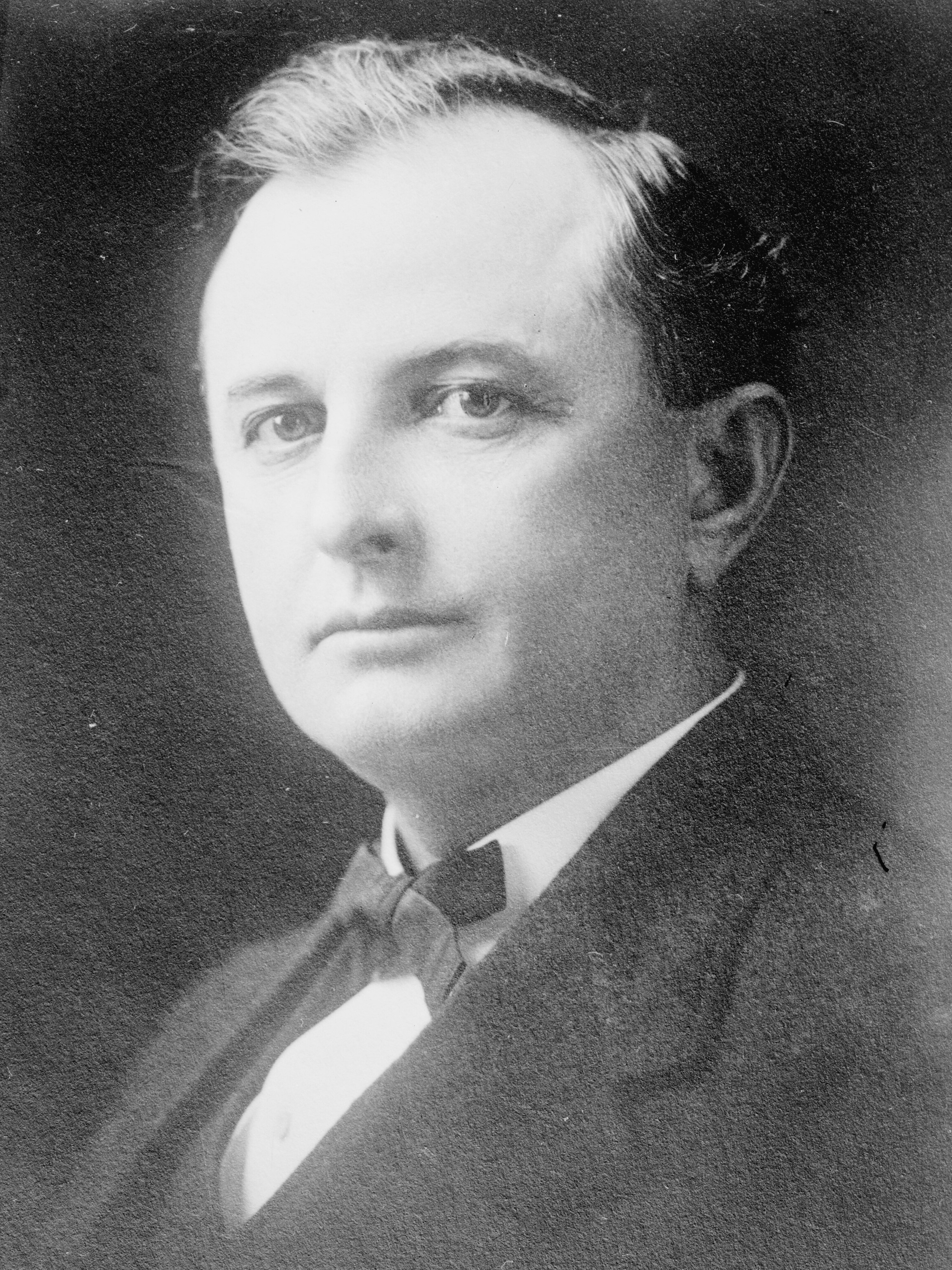

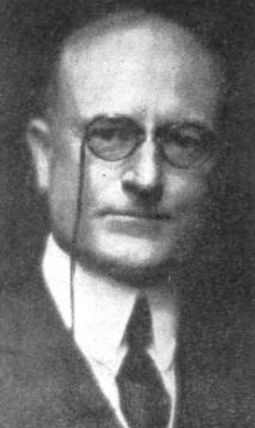
Nominee	James E. Ferguson	R. B. Creager
Party	Democratic	Republican
Popular vote	296,667	49,118
Percentage	81.60%	13.51%
- County results Ferguson: 50–60% 60–70% 70–80% 80–90% 90–100% Creager: 40–50% 50–60% 60–70% 80–90% No data/vote
Governor before election
James E. Ferguson
Democratic
Elected Governor
James E. Ferguson
Democratic

The 1916 Texas gubernatorial election was held on November 7, 1916, in order to elect the governor of Texas. Incumbent Democratic governor James E. "Pa" Ferguson easily won re-election to a second term, defeating his Republican challenger, Rentfro Creager.

Ferguson would be impeached and removed from office on nine charges just over nine months after his re-election in 1916. He was succeeded by Lieutenant Governor William P. Hobby.

== Democratic primary ==
In the primary, Governor Ferguson was challenged by fellow Democrat Charles H. Morris. Ferguson fended off the primary challenge, winning 57% of the vote and securing the nomination, which at the time, was seen as tantamount to victory, as Texas was a prohibitively Democratic-controlled state in the early 20th century.

=== Primary results ===
Democratic primary results
Party	Candidate	Votes	%
Democratic	James E. Ferguson (incumbent)	240,561	57.02
Democratic	Charles H. Morris	174,611	41.39
Democratic	H. C. Marshall	6,731	1.60
Total votes		421,903	100.00

== General election ==
Ferguson faced token Republican opposition in the general election from Republican nominee Rentfro Creager, and defeated him by a 68.1% margin of victory.

=== Results ===
1916 Texas gubernatorial election
Party	Candidate	Votes	%
Democratic	James E. Ferguson (incumbent)	296,667	81.60
Republican	Rentfro Banton Creager	49,118	13.51
Socialist	E. R. Meitzen	14,580	4.01
Prohibition	H. W. Lewis	3,200	0.88
Total votes		363,565	100.00
Democratic hold			
