= 1914 Texas gubernatorial election =

- November 3, 1914
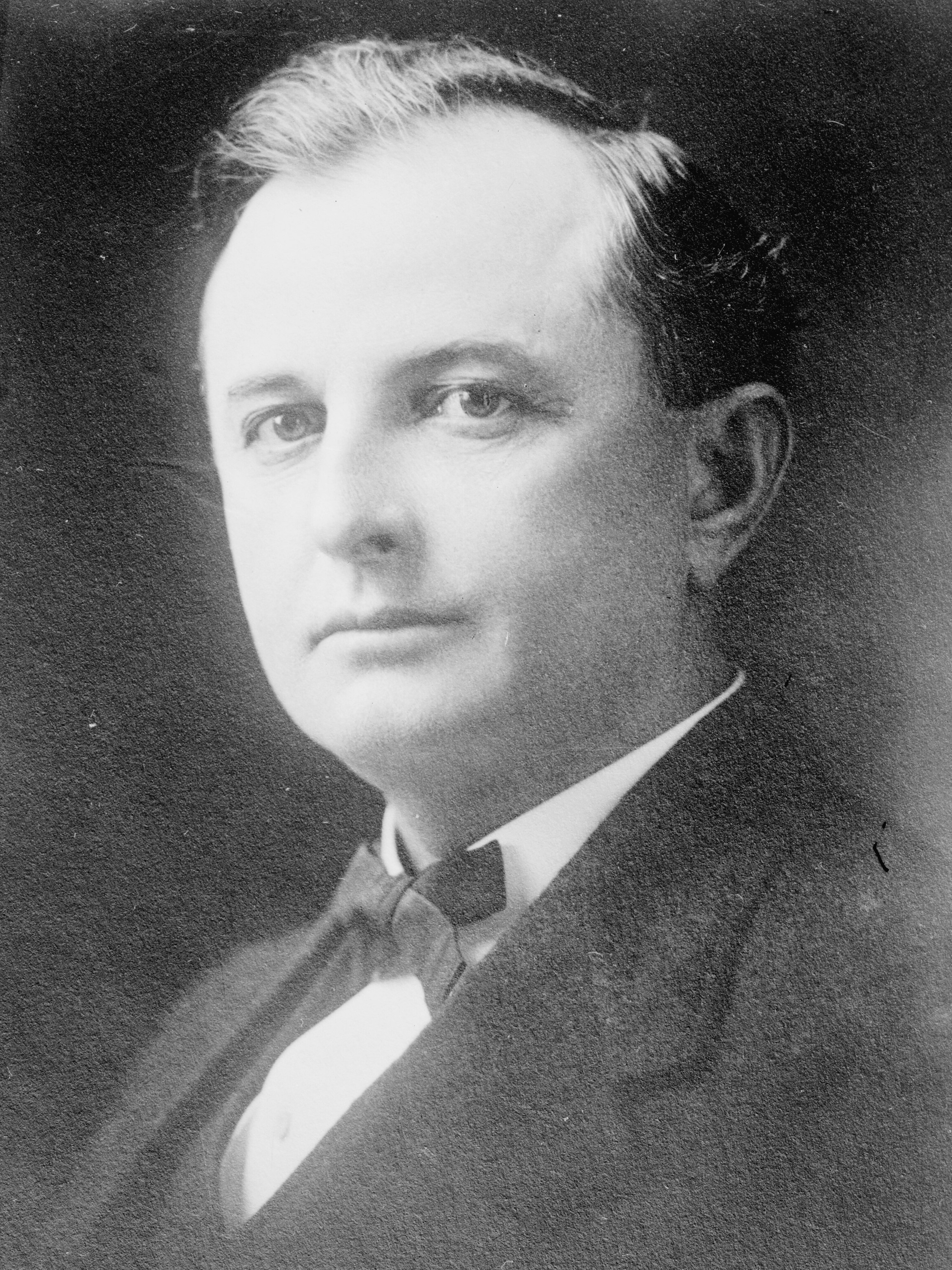

Nominee	James E. Ferguson	E.R. Meitzen	John W. Philip
Party	Democratic	Socialist	Republican
Popular vote	176,599	24,977	11,411
Percentage	81.95%	11.59%	5.30%
- County results Ferguson: 50–60% 60–70% 70–80% 80–90% 90–100% No Data/Vote
Governor before election
Oscar Branch Colquitt
Democratic
Elected Governor
James E. Ferguson
Democratic

The 1914 Texas gubernatorial election was held on November 3, 1914, in order to elect the Governor of Texas. James E. Ferguson, nominated by the Democratic Party, easily defeated his two general election opponents, E.R. Meitzen of the Socialist Party and John W. Philip of the Republican Party.

== Democratic primary ==
=== Candidates ===
- Thomas H. Ball, attorney and former U.S. Representative from Houston
- James Ferguson, banker and former city attorney of Belton

In the early 20th century, Texas was a prohibitively Democratic-controlled state, making a successful in any statewide primary akin to victory. Anti-prohibitionist and devout white supremacist James E. Ferguson defeated Thomas Henry Ball, a supporter of prohibition who had received the endorsements of President Woodrow Wilson and William Jennings Bryan.

=== Results ===
Democratic primary results
Party	Candidate	Votes	%
Democratic	James E. Ferguson	237,062	55.31
Democratic	Thomas H. Ball	191,558	44.69
Total votes		428,620	100.00

== General election ==
=== Candidates ===
- K. E. Choate (Socialist Labor)
- F. M. Etheridge (Progressive)
- James Ferguson, banker and former city attorney of Belton (Democratic)
- E. R. Meitzen (Socialist)
- John W. Philip (Republican)

=== Campaign ===
Ferguson faced token opposition from two candidates, Socialist E.R. Meitzen and Republican John W. Philip, along with a scattering of nominees from minor parties. As was typical of a Deep South state in this era, Ferguson won overwhelmingly, keeping the governor's mansion in Democratic hands.

=== Results ===
1914 Texas Gubernatorial Election
Party	Candidate	Votes	%	±%
Democratic	James E. Ferguson	176,599	81.95	▲4.13
Socialist	E.R. Meitzen	24,977	11.59	▲3.20
Republican	John W. Philp	11,411	5.30	▼2.37
Progressive	F.M. Etheridge	1,794	0.83	▼4.41
Socialist Labor	K.E. Choate	680	0.32	▲0.22
Write-in		29	0.01	N/A
Total votes		215,490	100.00	
Democratic hold				
