= Miriam A. Ferguson =

American politician (1875–1961)

Ma Ferguson
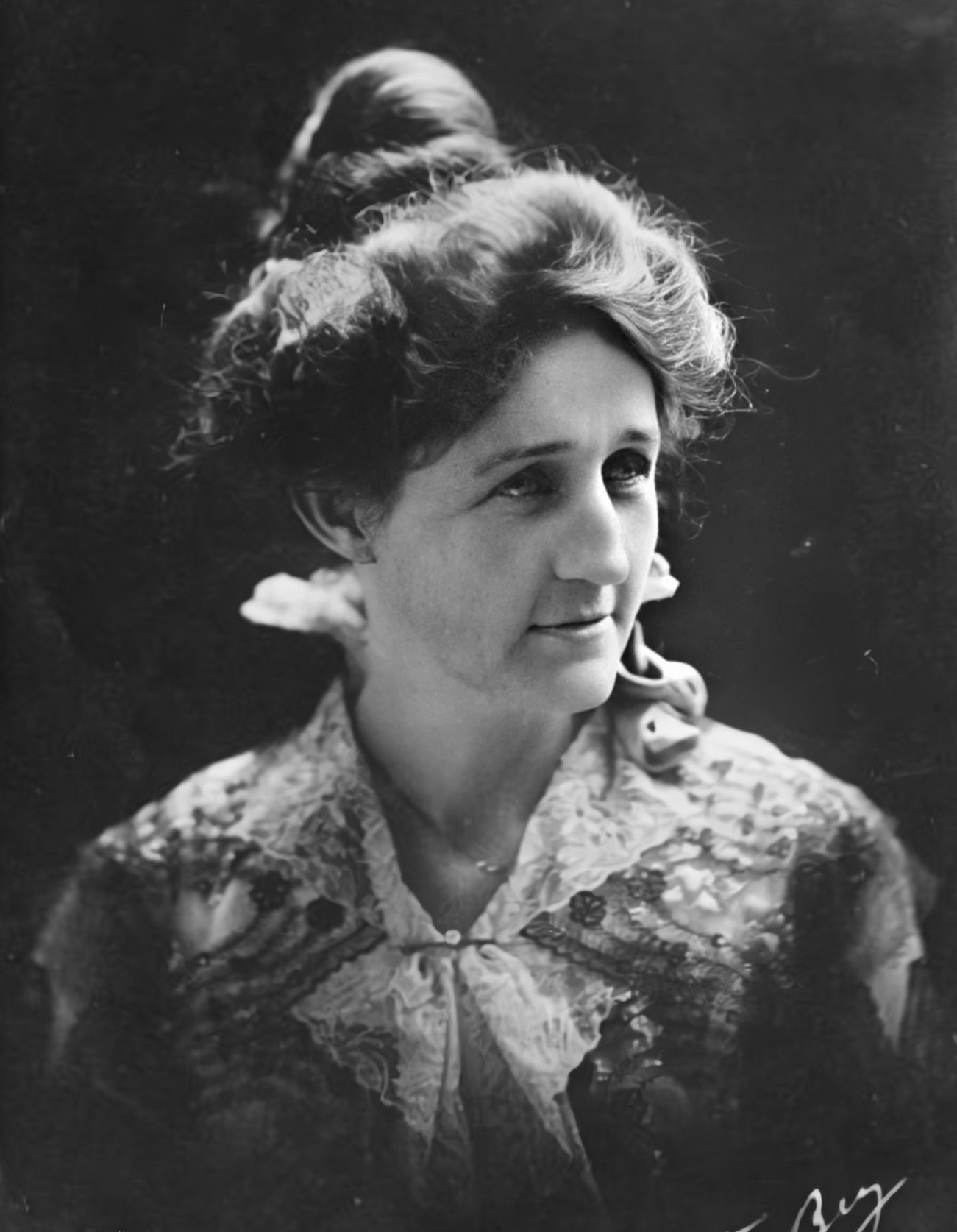

29th & 32nd Governor of Texas
- In office January 17, 1933 – January 15, 1935
- Lieutenant: Edgar E. Witt
- Preceded by: Ross S. Sterling
- Succeeded by: James V. Allred
- In office January 20, 1925 – January 18, 1927
- Lieutenant: Barry Miller
- Preceded by: Pat Morris Neff
- Succeeded by: Dan Moody

First Lady of Texas
- In role January 19, 1915 – August 25, 1917
- Governor: James E. Ferguson
- Preceded by: Alice Murrell Colquitt
- Succeeded by: Willie Cooper Hobby

Personal details
- Born: Miriam Amanda Wallace; June 13, 1875 Bell County, Texas, U.S.
- Died: June 25, 1961 (aged 86) Austin, Texas, U.S.
- Party: Democratic
- Spouse: James E. Ferguson (m. 1899; died 1944)
- Children: 2
- Education: Salado College (attended); University of Mary Hardin (attended)

Miriam Amanda "Ma" Ferguson (née Wallace; June 13, 1875 – June 25, 1961) was an American politician who served two non-consecutive terms as the governor of Texas: from 1925 to 1927, and from 1933 to 1935. She was the first female governor of Texas, and the second woman elected to the governorship of any U.S. state to assume office, after Nellie Tayloe Ross of Wyoming.

== Early life ==
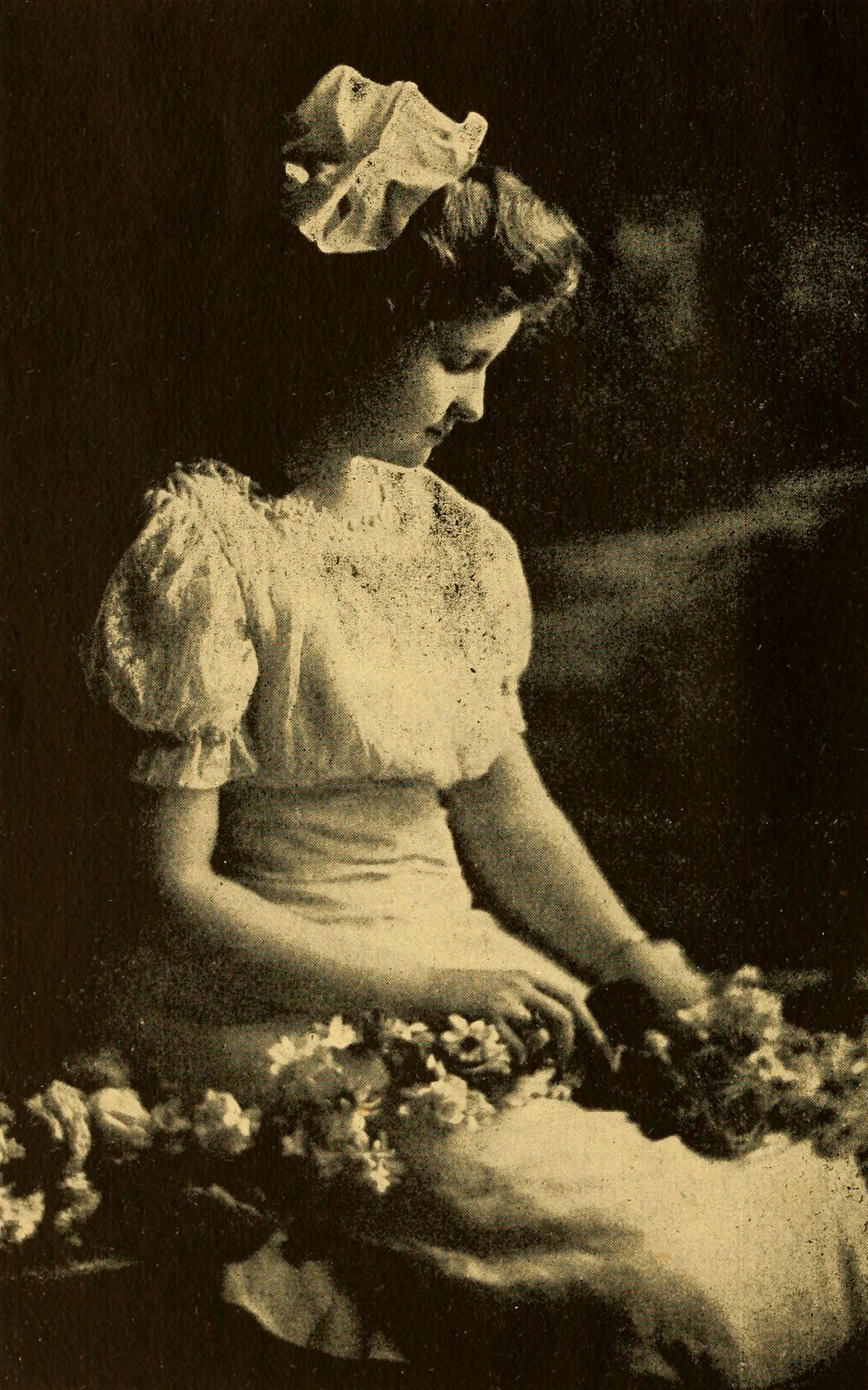
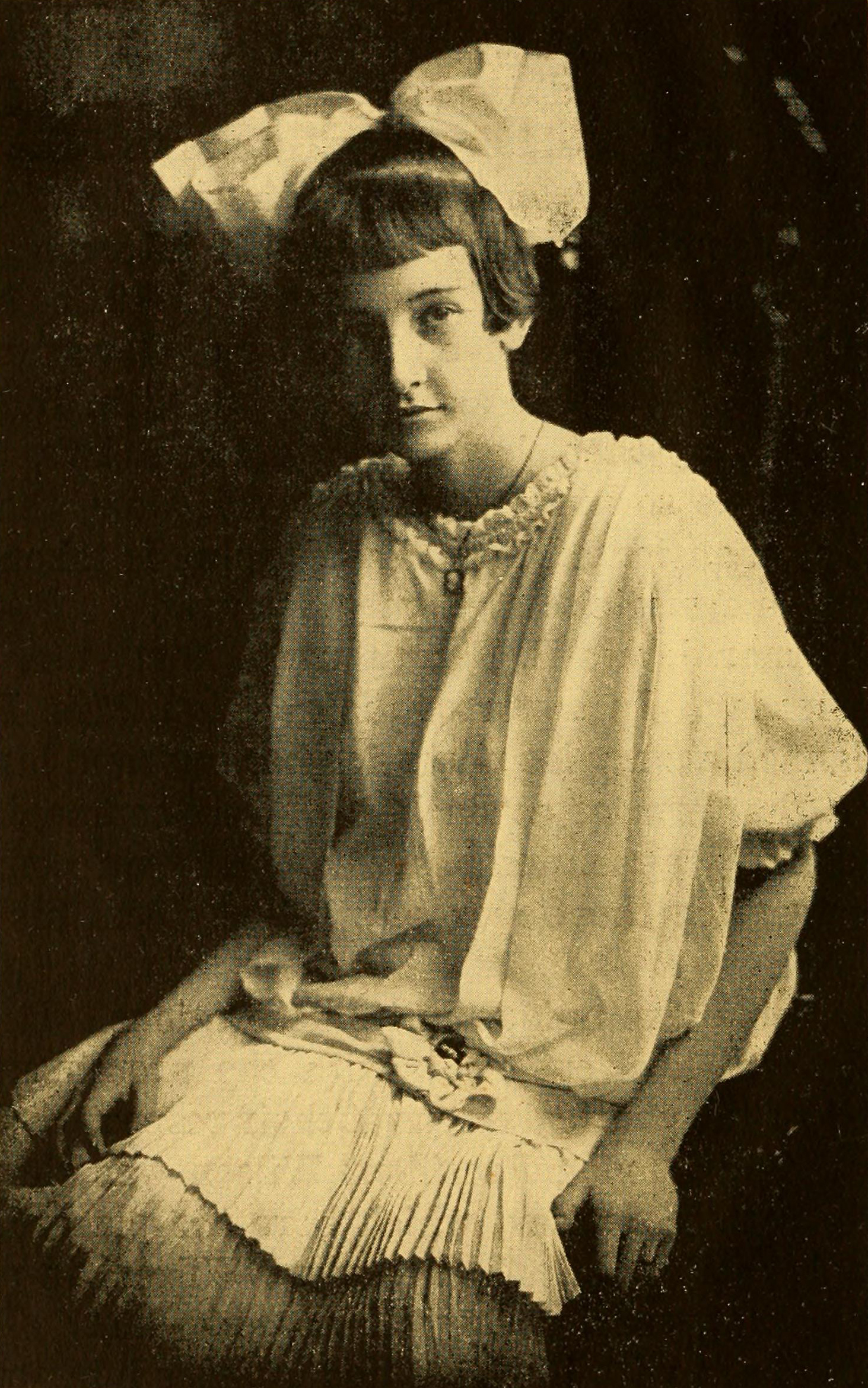
Daughters Ouida and Dorrace Ferguson

Miriam Amanda Wallace Ferguson was born in Bell County, Texas. She studied at Salado College and Baylor Female College. When she was 24, she married James Edward Ferguson, a lawyer, at her father's farm near Belton in Bell County, Texas.

Her nickname, "Ma", came from her initials, "M. A.", and the fact that her husband was known as "Pa" Ferguson. They had two daughters: Ouida Wallace Ferguson and Dorrace Watt Ferguson.

== Early political career ==
Her husband served as Governor of Texas from 1915 to 1917. During his second term, he was investigated by State Attorney General Dan Moody (who would, incidentally, succeed her as Governor in 1927 after her first term) for actions that had been taken against the University of Texas. The Texas State Senate impeached him, convicted him on ten charges, and prohibited him from holding state office in Texas again.

== 1924 election and first term ==
After her husband's impeachment and conviction, Ma Ferguson ran in the primary for the Democratic nomination for governor and was successful, openly supported by her husband, whom she said she would consult for advice. She ran for office in the 1924 general election.

During her campaign, she said that voters would get "two governors for the price of one". Her speeches at rallies consisted of introducing him and letting him take the platform. A common campaign slogan was, "Me for Ma, and I Ain't Got a Durned Thing Against Pa." Patricia Bernstein of the Houston Chronicle stated "There was never a question in anyone's mind as to who was really running things when Ma was governor."

After her victory in the Democratic primary, Ferguson defeated George C. Butte, a prominent lawyer and University of Texas dean who emerged as the strongest Republican gubernatorial nominee in Texas since Reconstruction. Due to the widespread corruption of her husband's term, resulting in his impeachment, thousands of voters crossed party lines in the general election to vote for the Republican candidate. Republicans usually took between 11,000 and 30,000 votes for governor, but Butte won nearly 300,000 votes, many of them from women and suffragists. It was still primarily a Democratic state, and Ferguson received 422,563 votes (58.9 percent) to Butte's 294,920 (41.1 percent). Butte had been supported in the general election by former governor William P. Hobby, who had succeeded James Ferguson in 1917 and won a full term in 1918.

In 1924, Ma Ferguson became the first elected female chief executive of Texas. She was the second elected female state governor in the United States to assume office, and the first to be elected in a general election. Nellie Tayloe Ross had been sworn in as governor of Wyoming to finish the unexpired term of her late husband two weeks before Ferguson's inauguration, though Ross and Ferguson won their respective elections on the same day. Ferguson's campaign manager was Homer T. Brannon of Fort Worth, Texas.

In 1926, state attorney general Dan Moody, who had investigated her husband for embezzlement and recovered $1 million for Texas citizens, ran against her in a run-off election. He defeated her to become the next and then-youngest governor of Texas. Suffragist activism provided a major contribution to her defeat, as these women rallied behind Moody and campaigned for him.

== 1932 election and second term ==
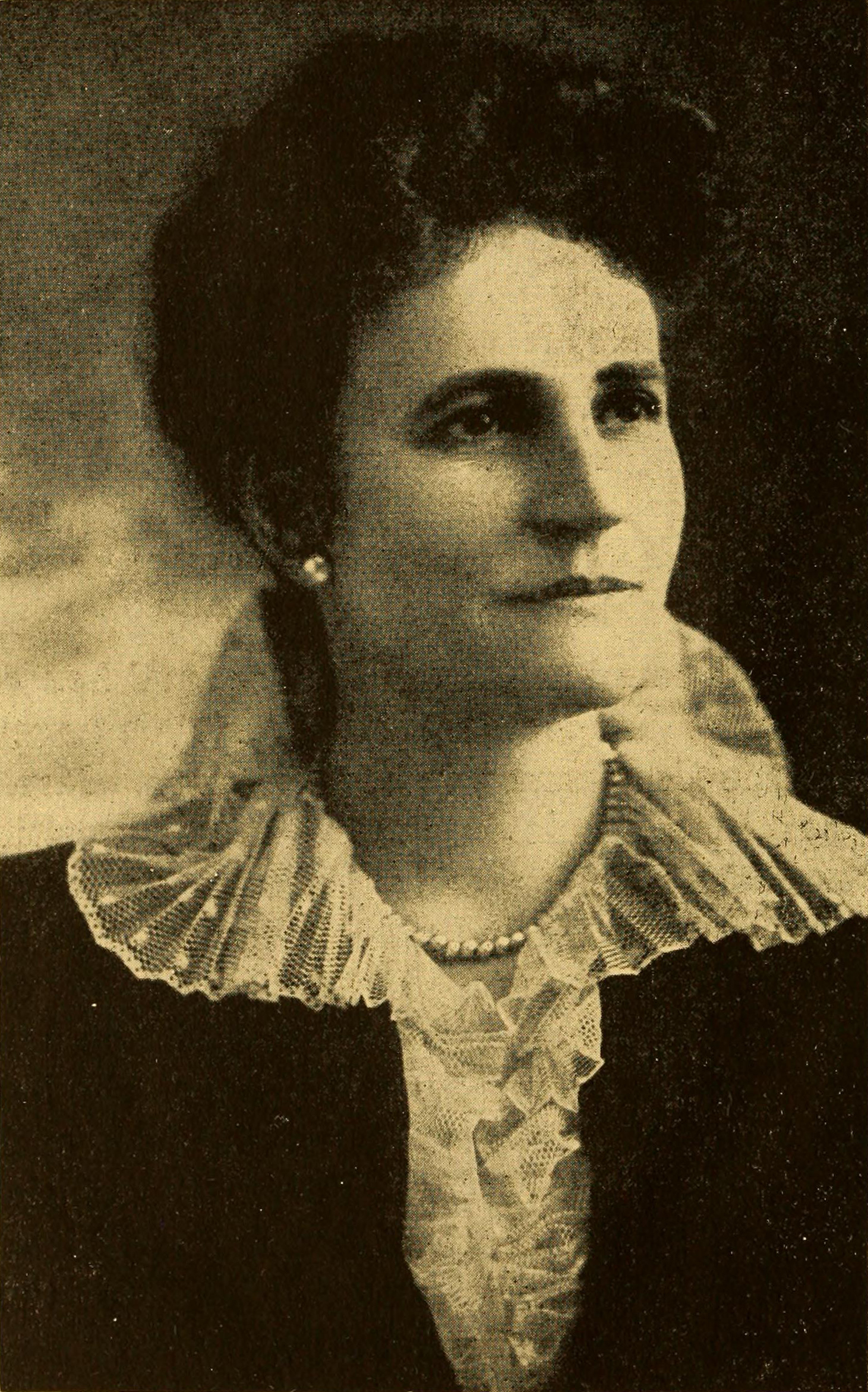
Edwina Crockett Snider, Ferguson's social secretary (as First Lady of Texas)

Ferguson ran again in 1932. She narrowly won the Democratic nomination over incumbent Ross S. Sterling, then soundly defeated Republican Orville Bullington in the general election, 521,395 (61.6 percent) to 322,589 (38.1 percent). It was a year of Democratic successes as Franklin D. Roosevelt was elected as President of the United States. Bullington was a cousin of the first wife of John G. Tower, future U.S. Senator from Texas. He fared more strongly than most Texas Republican candidates did in that period, but did not match Butte's 1924 showing against Ferguson.

Ferguson's second term as governor was less controversial than her first. It was rumored that state highway contracts went only to companies that advertised in the Fergusons' newspaper, the Ferguson Forum. A House committee investigated the rumors, but no charges were ever filed. The Great Depression forced both the federal and state governments to cut down on personnel and funding of their organizations, and the Texas Rangers were no exception. The number of commissioned officers in the law-enforcement agency was reduced to 45, and the only means of transportation afforded to Rangers were free railroad passes, or using their personal horses. The situation worsened for the Rangers when they entangled themselves in politics in 1932 by publicly supporting Governor Ross Sterling in his re-election campaign over "Ma" Ferguson. Immediately after taking office in January 1933, she proceeded to discharge all serving Rangers. The force also saw its salaries and funds slashed by the Texas Legislature, and their numbers reduced further to 32 men. The result was that Texas became a safe hideout for the many Depression-era gangsters escaping from the law, such as Bonnie and Clyde, George "Machine Gun" Kelly, Pretty Boy Floyd and Raymond Hamilton. The hasty appointment of many unqualified Rangers to stop the increasing criminality proved ineffective and eventually led to the creation of the Texas Department of Public Safety (DPS).

In October 1933, Ferguson signed into law Texas House Bill 194, which was instrumental in establishing the University of Houston as a four-year institution.

== Views and policies ==
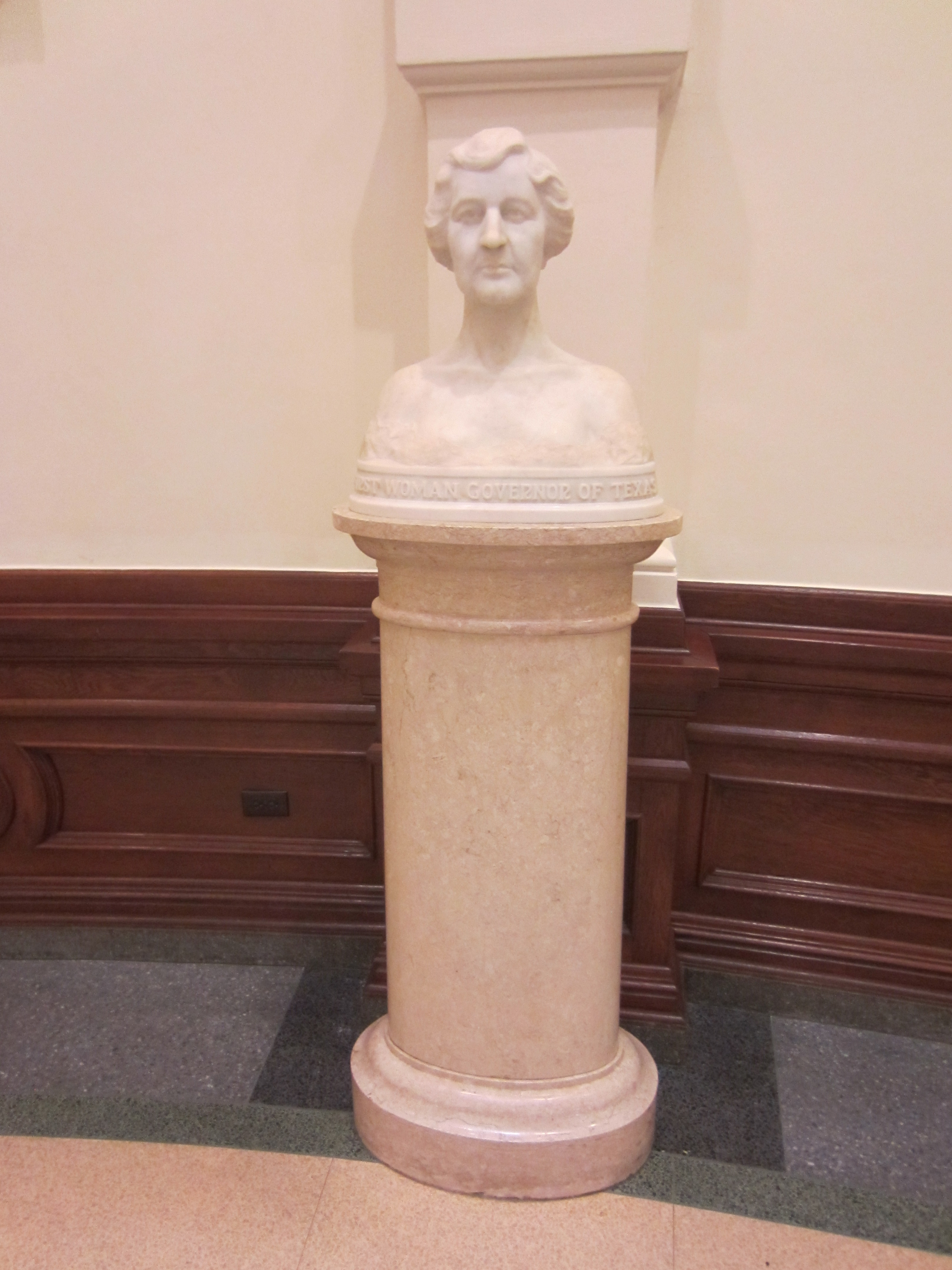
Bust of Ferguson by Enrico Cerracchio

"Fergusonism", as the Fergusons' brand of populism was called, remains a controversial subject in Texas. As governor, she tackled some of the tougher issues of the day. Though a teetotaler like her husband, she aligned herself with the "wets" in the battle over prohibition. She opposed the Ku Klux Klan, which was on the decline after 1925 because of a national murder and sex scandal by its president, D. C. Stephenson.

Ferguson has been described as a fiscal conservative but also pushed for a state sales tax and corporate income tax. She is often credited with a quote allegedly referring to bilingualism in Texas schools: "If English was good enough for Jesus Christ, it ought to be good enough for the children of Texas." Variations of this statement have been dated to 1881, and were often used to ridicule the claimed backwardness of various unnamed Christians. Ferguson did not originate the quote.

Ferguson issued almost 4,000 pardons during her two nonconsecutive terms in office, many of them to free persons who had been convicted of violating prohibition laws. In 1930, between Ferguson's terms, the Secretary of State of Texas Jane Y. McCallum published a pamphlet criticizing the former governor's numerous pardons of prisoners. Though never proven, rumors persisted that pardons were available in exchange for cash payments to the governor's husband. In 1936, voters passed an amendment to the state constitution stripping the governor of the power to issue pardons and granting that power to a politically independent Texas Board of Pardons and Paroles (see Capital punishment in Texas).

A number of labor laws were also passed during Ferguson's two terms as governor.

In a 1932 speech, Ferguson's husband James E. Ferguson defended the record of "Fergusonism;" listing reforms such as child labor and workmen's compensation laws, aid for rural education, a free textbook law, and laws regulating the working hours of women. Miriam Ferguson herself defended “Fergusonism;” citing liberal measures such as a semi-monthly pay day law, an eight-hour law, the establishment of an Industrial Accident Board, and the creation of Lower Colorado and Brazos River Authorities.

== Post-governorship ==
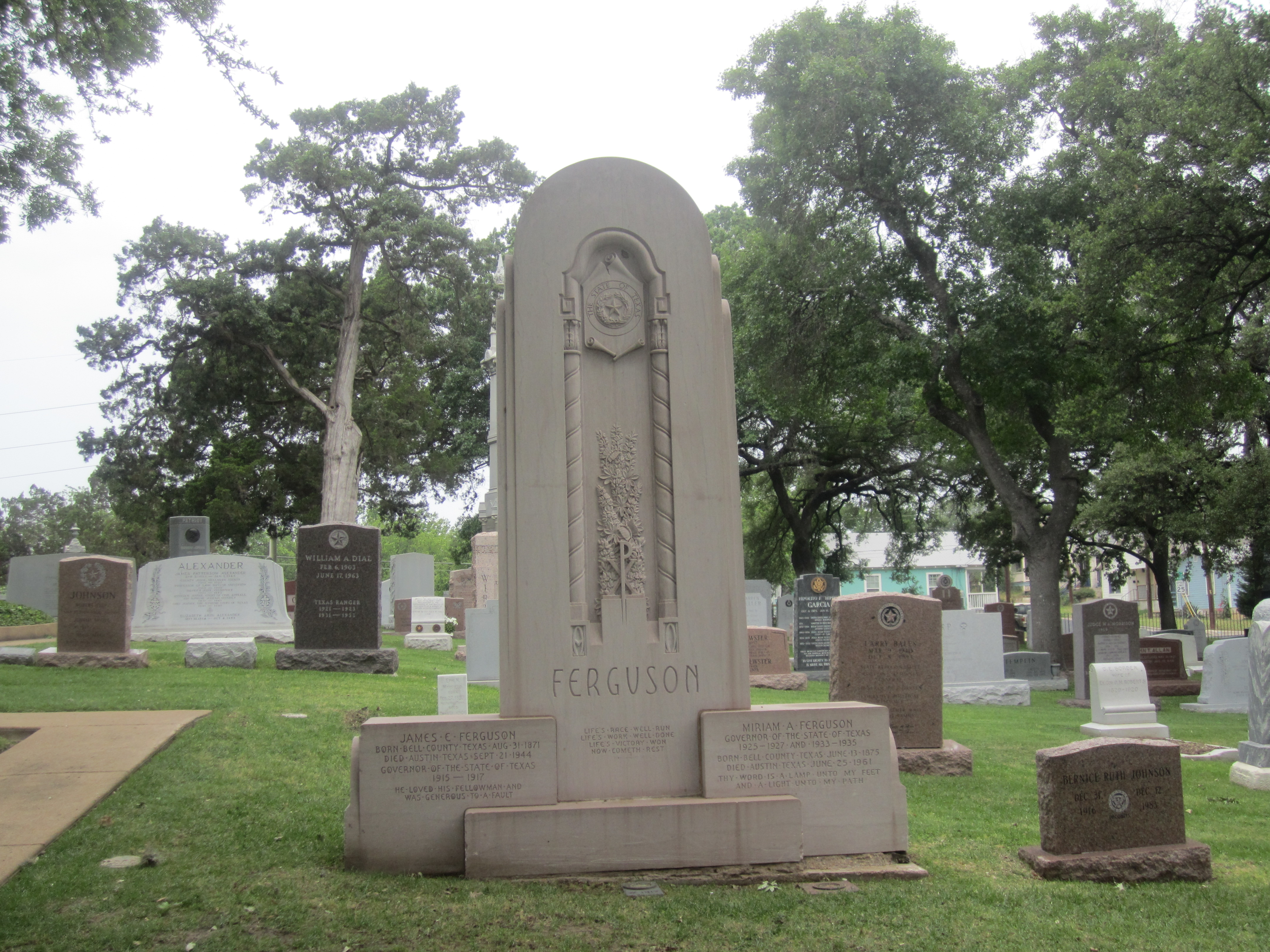
Monument to the Governors Ferguson at the Texas State Cemetery in Austin, Texas

Except for an unsuccessful bid to replace Governor W. Lee "Pappy" O'Daniel in 1940, the Fergusons remained retired from political life after 1935. In the 1940 campaign, Ma Ferguson trailed O'Daniel's principal rival, Ernest O. Thompson of Amarillo, who was Texas Railroad Commissioner.

Her husband, James, died of a stroke in 1944. Miriam Ferguson died from congestive heart failure in 1961 at the age of 86. She was buried in the Texas State Cemetery in Austin.

== See also ==
- List of female governors in the United States
- List of the first women holders of political offices in the United States

== Notes ==
Honorary titles
Preceded by Alice Colquitt	First Lady of Texas; 1915–1917	Succeeded by Willie Hobby
Party political offices
Preceded by Pat Neff	Democratic nominee for Governor of Texas; 1924	Succeeded by Dan Moody
Preceded by Ross Sterling	Democratic nominee for Governor of Texas; 1932	Succeeded by James V. Allred
Political offices
Preceded by Pat Neff	Governor of Texas; 1925–1927	Succeeded by Dan Moody
Preceded by Ross Sterling	Governor of Texas; 1933–1935	Succeeded by James V. Allred
