= James E. Ferguson =

American banker and politician (1871–1944)

James Ferguson
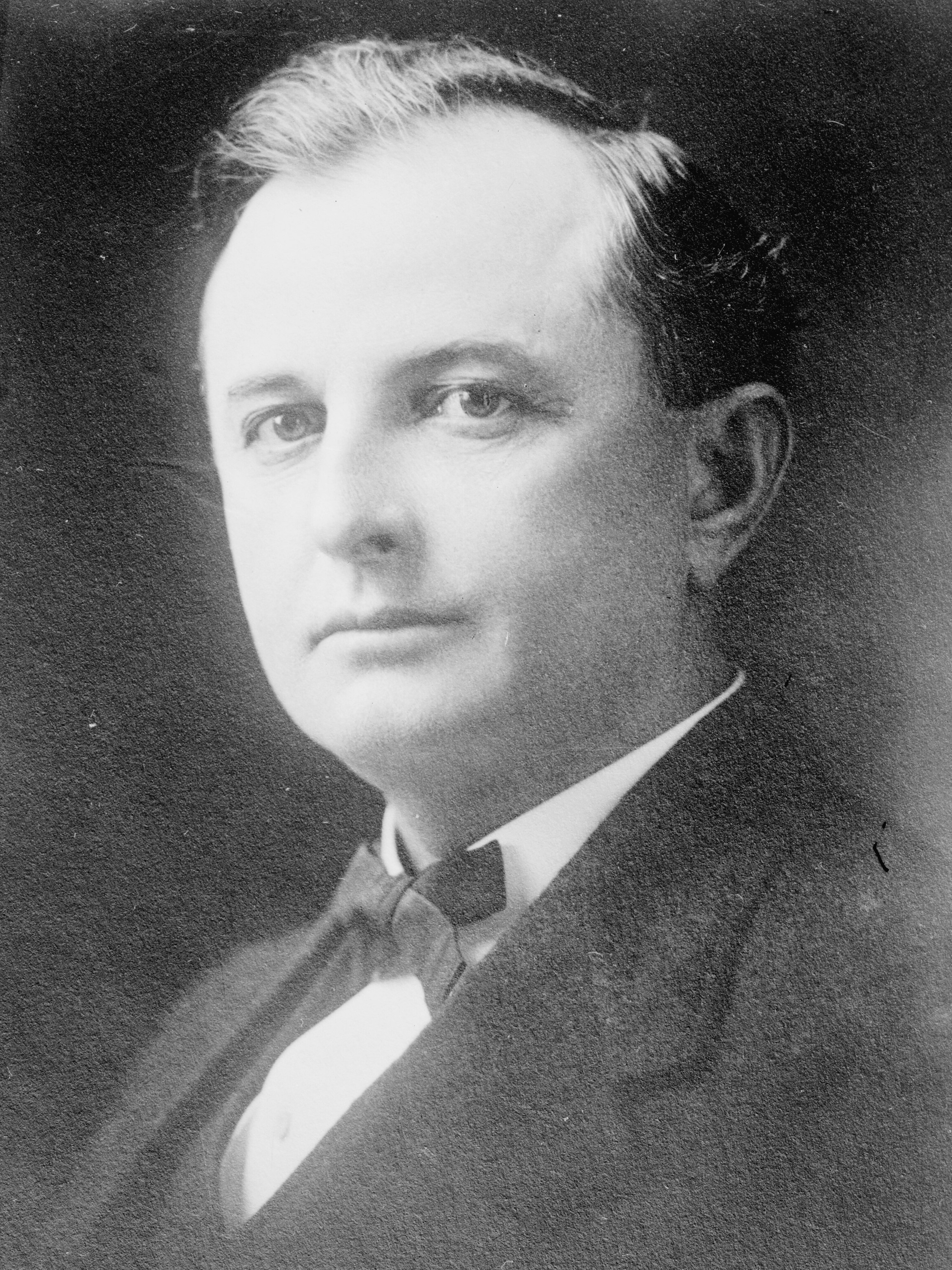
- Ferguson in 1914

26th Governor of Texas
- In office January 19, 1915 – August 25, 1917
- Lieutenant: William P. Hobby
- Preceded by: Oscar Branch Colquitt
- Succeeded by: William P. Hobby

First Gentleman of Texas
- In role January 17, 1933 – January 15, 1935
- Governor: Miriam A. Ferguson
- Preceded by: Maud Sterling
- Succeeded by: Josephine Allred
- In role January 20, 1925 – January 17, 1927
- Governor: Miriam A. Ferguson
- Preceded by: Myrtle Neff
- Succeeded by: Mildred Moody

Personal details
- Born: James Edward Ferguson Jr. August 31, 1871 Salado, Texas, U.S.
- Died: September 21, 1944 (aged 73) Austin, Texas, U.S.
- Resting place: Texas State Cemetery
- Party: Democratic
- Spouse: Miriam A. Wallace (m. 1899)
- Children: 2

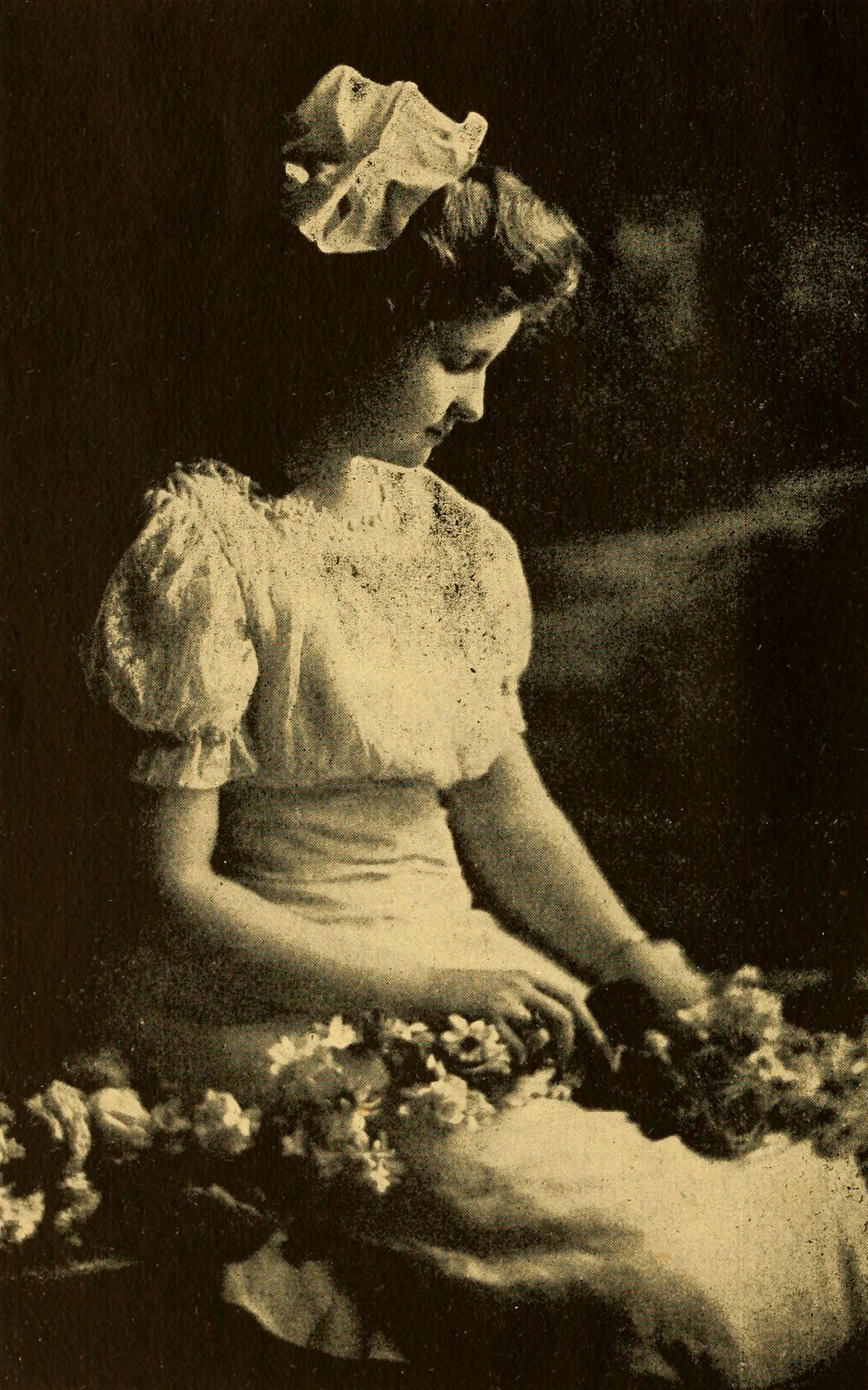
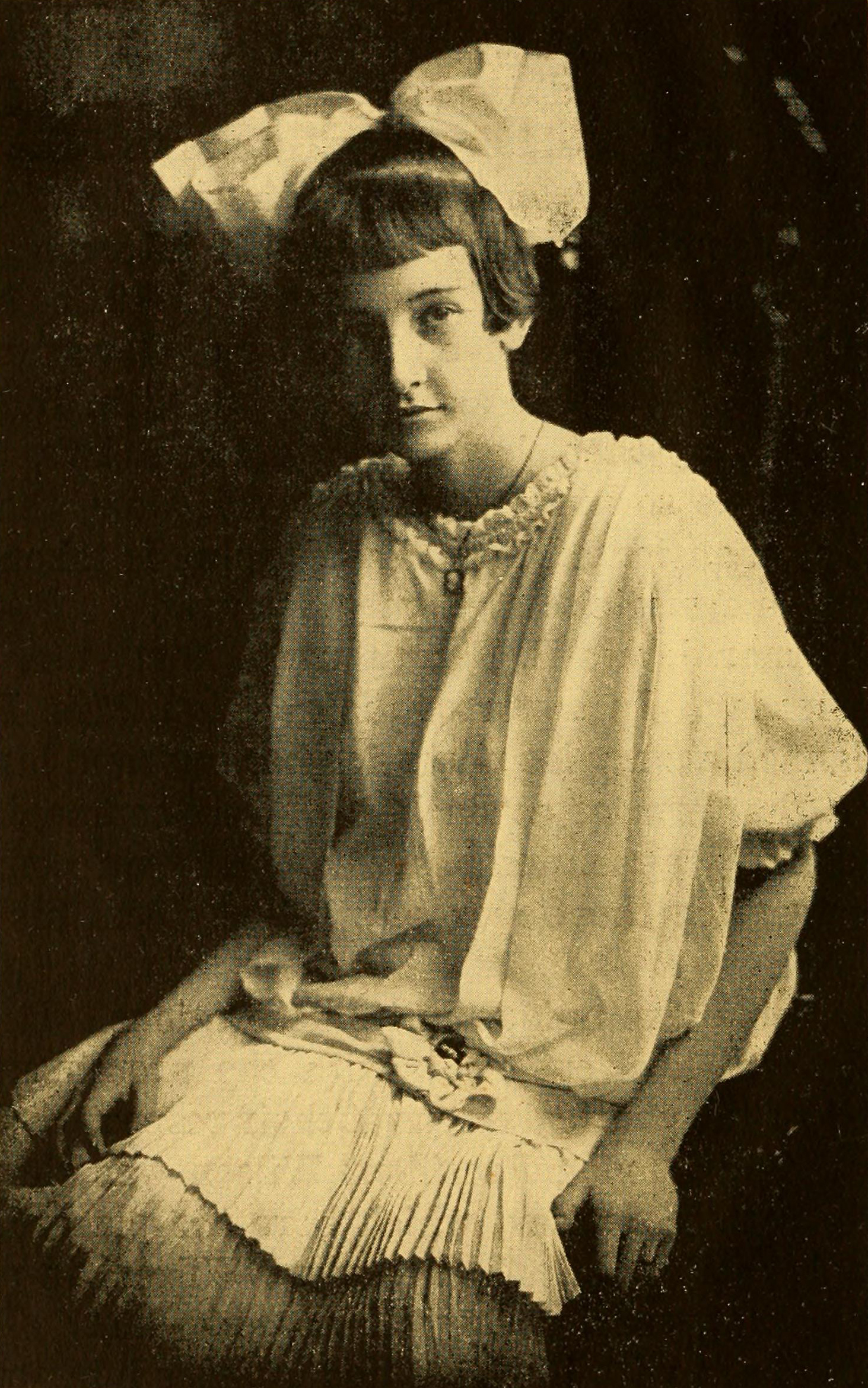
Daughters Ouida and Dorrace Ferguson

James Edward Ferguson Jr. (August 31, 1871 – September 21, 1944), known as Pa Ferguson, was an American Democratic politician who served as the 26th governor of Texas from 1915 to 1917. He was indicted and impeached during his second term, removed from office, and barred from holding further Texas office.

Unable to run under his own name, Ferguson ran his wife's campaign for governor; Miriam A. Ferguson, known as "Ma" Ferguson, was twice elected as governor, serving two non-consecutive terms, from 1925 to 1927 and 1933 to 1935. In 1925, Miriam became the first female governor of Texas after campaigning as a stand-in for her husband, and James E. Ferguson became the first gentleman of Texas for her two terms.

== Early life ==
Ferguson was born to the Reverend James E. Ferguson, and Fannie Ferguson near Salado in south Bell County, Texas. At age 12 he entered Salado College (a preparatory school) but was eventually expelled for disobedience. At 16, he left home and drifted through the states of the American West, working successively in a vineyard, a mine, a barbed wire factory, and at a grain ranch. After he returned to Texas, he studied law in Bell County and was admitted to the bar.

On December 31, 1899, he married Miriam A. Wallace at her family home. They had two daughters: Ouida Wallace Ferguson, and Dorrace Watt Ferguson. In 1903, Ferguson was elected as city attorney in Belton, Texas. In addition, he established Farmers State Bank. In 1906, he sold Farmers bank and established Temple State Bank.

He also became active in the Democratic Party and managed several local political campaigns. He believed that "a Negro has no business whatever taking a part in the political affairs of the Democratic party, the white man's party." A part of his appeal as a candidate for governor was his support for white supremacy in the political process.

== Governorship ==
=== First term as governor ===
In 1914, Ferguson was elected as governor of Texas by running as an anti-prohibitionist Democrat. When the Democratic Party dominated the Texas political landscape, winning the Democratic primary often sealed the election results. Ferguson was the only "wet" candidate in the Democratic primary and garnered all of the anti-prohibitionist votes over a plurality of "dry" candidates. Numerous reforms were implemented during Ferguson's first term, such as measures aimed at improving working conditions and a farm tenant law that provided for the rent on Texas farms to be limited to one-fourth of the cotton and one-third of the grain produced. In the Senate, it was accepted by a vote of 23 to 4. Similarly, in the House, it was accepted by 100 votes to 24. According to one study, however, the law "was not rigidly enforced and was declared unconstitutional in 1921."

Prior to his inauguration, Ferguson conferred with officials at the University of Texas regarding appointments affecting learning and higher education. According to historian Dan Utley, Ferguson planned to use state appointments as part of a spoils system to reward his political supporters. He tapped Reverend Allan Ferguson Cunningham to serve as State Librarian, despite his lack of training or experience in the field. The incumbent State Librarian was Ernest Winkler, who was a professional historian with years of experience as a librarian. The chair of the State Library and Historical Commission, Eugene C. Barker, heard talk about these plans and intervened in support of Winkler. He convened the commission, and the body approved that Barker write a letter to the Governor-elect. The letter claimed that Winkler was the best person for the job. Meanwhile, Winkler fought for his job by enlisting the help of his colleagues. Other high-profile librarians voiced their support of Winkler, as did the son of an ex-governor, and a chapter of the Daughters of the Republic of Texas.

=== Second term as governor ===
Further reforms were realized during Ferguson's second term, including a law establishing Mothers' pensions and additional labor legislation. However, his second term would not last long. After being re-elected in 1916, Ferguson vetoed the appropriations for the University of Texas. The veto was retaliation against the university because of its refusal to dismiss certain faculty members whom Ferguson found objectionable, including William Harding Mayes, former Texas lieutenant governor and founder and dean of the University of Texas School of Journalism. He had been an opponent of Ferguson for the Democratic party's nomination for governor in 1914.

The accusations against Mayes were that he used his ownership of newspapers, including the Brownwood Bulletin, to spread negative information about Ferguson. Another leading Ferguson critic on the UT campus was the historian Eugene C. Barker.

Ferguson's attack against Mayes resulted in a drive by the legislature to impeach Ferguson. The chairman of the investigating committee, William H. Bledsoe of Lubbock, called for impeachment. Ferguson was indicted on nine charges in July 1917. The Texas House of Representatives prepared 21 charges against Ferguson, and, in his impeachment trial, the Texas Senate convicted him on 10 of those charges, including misapplication of public funds and receiving $156,000 from an unnamed source.

The Texas Senate, many of whom had served under Mayes and with whom Mayes maintained cordial relationships, removed Ferguson as governor and declared him ineligible to hold office under Texas jurisdiction. He is the only statewide officeholder to be convicted and removed from office.

Despite this, Ferguson ran for governor in the 1918 Democratic primary, but was defeated by his successor and incumbent, William P. Hobby of Houston, previously the lieutenant governor.

== Presidential candidate ==
Ferguson also ran for President of the United States in the 1920 election as the candidate of the American Party. Ferguson was on the ballot only in Texas, where he received 47,968 votes (9.9 percent of the vote in Texas, 0.2 percent of the vote nationwide). Ferguson's platform included opposition to the League of Nations, opposition to a national prohibition of alcohol, and a full pardon to Eugene V. Debs. Ferguson sought the support of Warren Harding and the Republican Party to convince its voters to vote for the American Party ticket and unite the anti-Democratic vote in Texas. The 1920 presidential election was won by Republican Party candidate Warren Harding. The Democratic nominee James M. Cox won in Texas, where the White majority voted solidly Democratic. Nationally, Ferguson was also surpassed by three other unsuccessful candidates:

- Eugene Victor Debs of the Socialist Party of America.
- Parley Parker Christensen of the United States Farmer–Labor Party.
- Aaron Sherman Watkins of the United States Prohibition Party.

Though Ferguson was unsuccessful in the presidential election, the American Party did elect four members to the Texas House of Representatives; Walter J. Kveton of Sealy, Otto F. Menking of Fayetteville, Henry Julius Neinast of Burton, and John Henry Wessels of La Grange. On January 28, 1922, Ferguson dissolved the American Party in order to run for the Democratic nomination for U.S. Senate in the 1922 election.

== Senate bid and First Gentleman of Texas ==
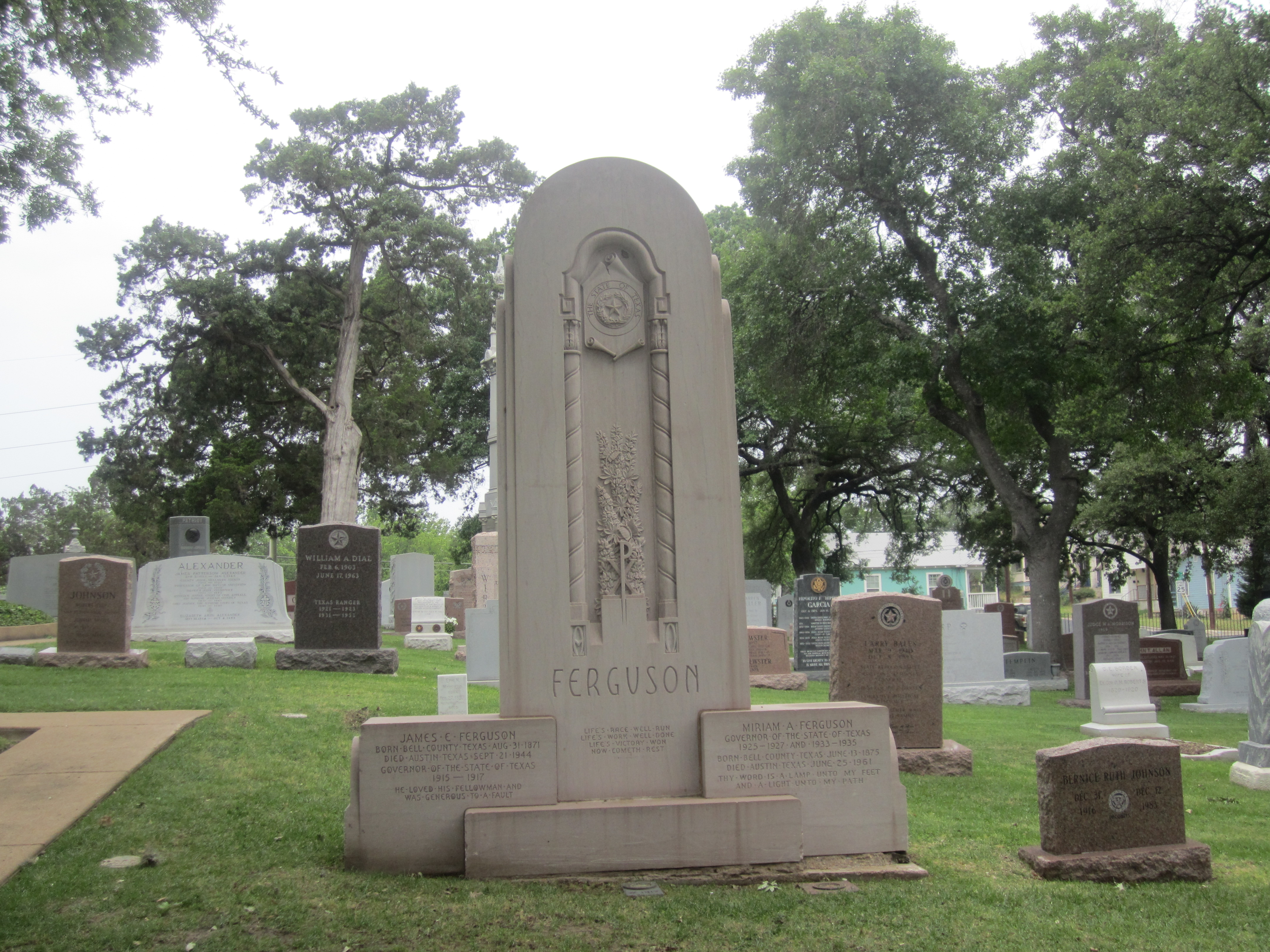
Monument to the governors Ferguson at the Texas State Cemetery in Austin, Texas

Ferguson failed at his bid for the United States Senate in 1922, losing in the Democratic runoff election to Earle Bradford Mayfield.

In 1924, Ferguson entered his wife Miriam, known as "Ma", in the Democratic gubernatorial primary. She won that and the general election, saying that she intended to rely on her husband for advice. In 1924, unable to run under his own name, Mr. Ferguson, known as "Pa", ran his wife's campaign for the governorship against Judge Felix Robertson, the candidate endorsed by the Ku Klux Klan. The Fergusons beat Robertson and went to the Governor's Mansion for a third time. Two years later they lost a reelection bid amid new scandals concerning excessive pardons and political patronage abuses.

Miriam Ferguson served two nonconsecutive two-year terms as governor: January 20, 1925 – January 17, 1927 and January 17, 1933 – January 15, 1935.

"Ma" Ferguson became the second female governor in the United States, after Nellie Tayloe Ross of Wyoming. Both women followed husbands who had served earlier. Nellie Tayloe Ross was sworn in on January 5, 1925; Miriam Ferguson followed on January 20.

== See also ==
- Conservative Democrat

== Notes ==
Party political offices
Preceded by Oscar Branch Colquitt	Democratic nominee for Governor of Texas; 1914, 1916	Succeeded by William P. Hobby
Political offices
Preceded by Oscar Branch Colquitt	Governor of Texas; 1915–1917	Succeeded by William P. Hobby
