= Lynch Davidson =

American politician

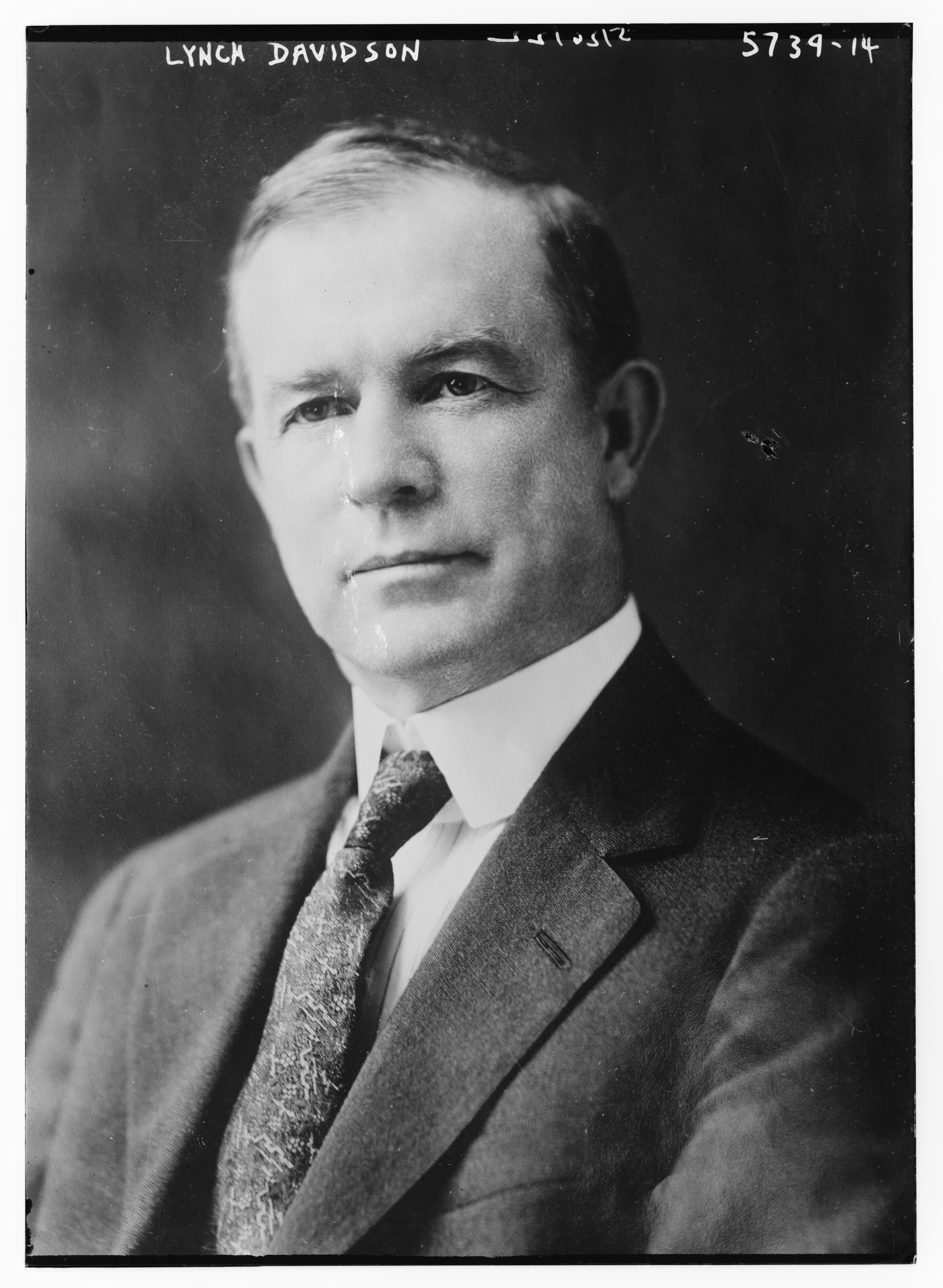
- Davidson in 1900

26th Lieutenant Governor of Texas
- In office January 18, 1921 – January 16, 1923
- Governor: Pat Morris Neff
- Preceded by: Willard Arnold Johnson
- Succeeded by: Thomas Whitfield Davidson

Personal details
- Born: January 3, 1873 Boyce, Louisiana, U.S.
- Died: January 27, 1952 (aged 79) Houston, Texas, U.S.

Lynch Davidson was an American politician who served as the 26th lieutenant governor of Texas from 1921 to 1923.

== Biography ==
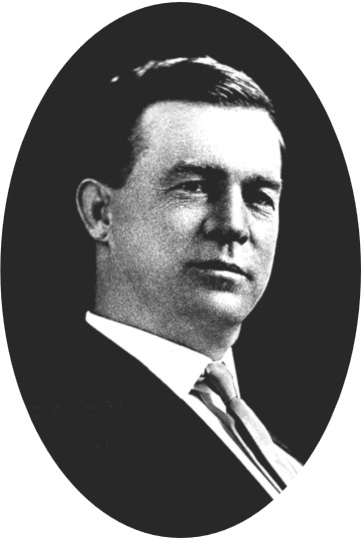
Lynch Davidson

Davidson was born on January 3, 1873, in Cotile Landing, Louisiana, now Boyce, Louisiana, to Lieutenant William Neal Davidson and Laura Cecelia Lynch, a native of Washington County, Texas whose father Joseph Penn Lynch was a veteran of the Texas Revolution, and served primarily during the Battle of San Jacinto. Davidson moved to Groesbeck, Texas as in infant. He remained in Groesbeck until 1887, when he finished high school at age 15 and moved to Houston. Upon his move, he immediately set out to become a lumberman in order to support his widowed mother. He was able to secure a job at a sawmill in Groveton. After 5 years of selling lumber in Mexico, he opened his own business in Laredo at the age of 23. He was married to Katie Calvert in June 1897, and they had three daughters, Marion, Lois, and Katie. He died on January 27, 1952, in Houston, and was buried in Hollywood Cemetery (also in Houston).

Party political offices
Preceded by Willard Arnold Johnson	Democratic nominee for Lieutenant Governor of Texas; 1920	Succeeded by Thomas Whitfield Davidson
Political offices
Preceded by Willard Arnold Johnson	Lieutenant Governor of Texas; 1921–1923	Succeeded by Thomas Whitfield Davidson
