= Rentfro Banton Creager =

American politician (1877–1950)

R. B. Creager
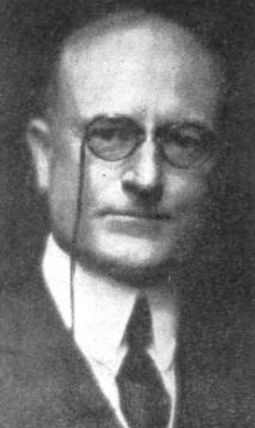
- Creager in 1922

Republican National Committeeman from Texas
- In office 1923–1950
- Preceded by: Henry F. McGregor
- Succeeded by: Henry Zweifel

Personal details
- Born: Rentfro Banton Creager; March 11, 1877 Waco, Texas, U.S.
- Died: October 28, 1950 (aged 73) Brownsville, Texas, U.S.
- Party: Republican
- Spouse: Alice (née Terrell) (m. 1904)
- Children: 4
- Education: Southwestern University (BS); University of Texas (LL.B.)

Rentfro Banton "R.B." Creager (March 11, 1877 – October 28, 1950) was an American politician who served as the Republican National Committeeman from Texas from 1923 until his death in 1950.

== Biography ==
Rentfro Banton Creager was born March 11, 1877, in Waco, Texas. He was educated at Southwestern University and ultimately earned an LL.B. from the University of Texas. A Republican since choosing William McKinley over Democratic candidate William Jennings Bryan in the 1896 United States presidential election, Creager had a long career in Republican politics. In 1900, he was made the customs collector for Roma, Texas. Two years later, he was made the collector of customs for the Brazos de Santiago District, a position in which he served until fired by William Howard Taft for his support of Theodore Roosevelt and the Bull Moose Party in the 1912 election. He was Republican candidate in the 1916 Texas gubernatorial election and in 1923, after the death of Henry F. McGregor, he began his tenure as the Republican National Committeeman from Texas. At the time of his death, he was the Republican Party's most senior national committeeman. He was succeeded as national committeeman by Henry Zweifel.

Party political offices
Preceded by Henry F. McGregor	Republican National Committeeman from Texas; 1923–1950	Succeeded by Henry Zweifel
Preceded by John W. Phillip	Republican nominee for Governor of Texas; 1916	Succeeded by Charles Boynton
