= 1950 Texas gubernatorial election =

- November 7, 1950
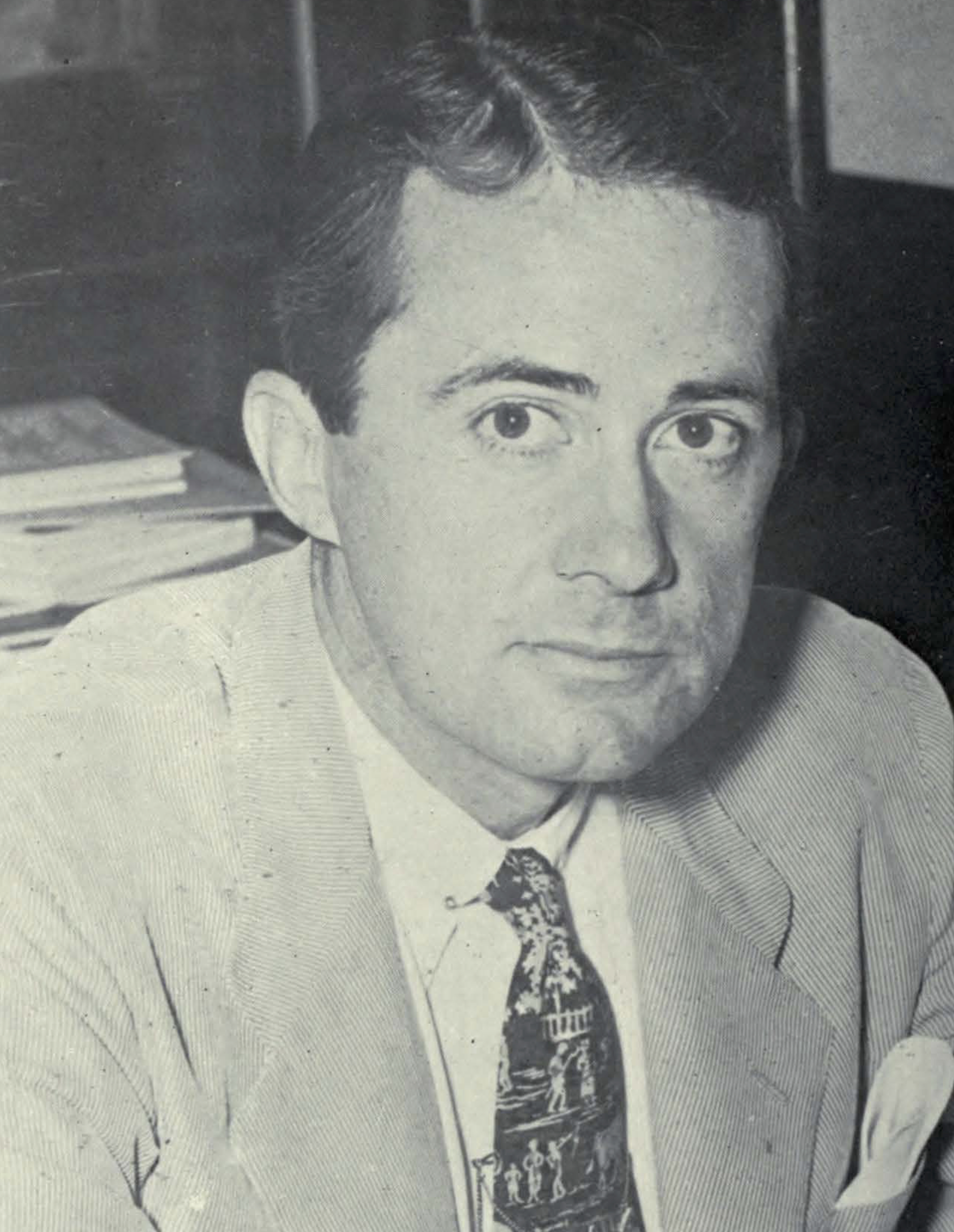

Nominee	Allan Shivers	Ralph W. Currie
Party	Democratic	Republican
Popular vote	355,010	39,737
Percentage	89.93%	10.07%
- County results Shivers: 50–60% 60–70% 70–80% 80–90% >90% No votes
Governor before election
Allan Shivers
Democratic
Elected Governor
Allan Shivers
Democratic

The 1950 Texas gubernatorial election was held on November 7, 1950.

Incumbent Democratic Governor Allan Shivers defeated Republican nominee Ralph W. Currie with 89.93% of the vote.

== Primary elections ==
Primary elections were held on July 22, 1950.

=== Democratic primary ===
==== Candidates ====
- Wellington Abbey
- Charles B. Hutchison, unsuccessful candidate for Democratic nomination for governor in 1946 and 1948
- Benita Lawrence, teacher
- Caso March, former Baylor University law professor and unsuccessful candidate for Democratic nomination for governor in 1946 and 1948
- Gene S. Porter, unsuccessful candidate for Democratic nomination for governor in 1942 and 1944
- Allan Shivers, incumbent Governor
- J. M. Wren

==== Results ====
Democratic primary results
Party	Candidate	Votes	%
Democratic	Allan Shivers (incumbent)	829,730	76.36
Democratic	Caso March	195,997	18.04
Democratic	Charles B. Hutchison	16,048	1.48
Democratic	Gene S. Porter	14,728	1.36
Democratic	J. M. Wren	14,138	1.30
Democratic	Benita Louise Marek Lawrence	9,542	0.88
Democratic	Wellington Abbey	6,381	0.59
Total votes		1,086,564	100.00

== General election ==
=== Candidates ===
- Allan Shivers, Democratic
- Ralph W. Currie, Republican

=== Results ===
1950 Texas gubernatorial election
Party	Candidate	Votes	%	±%
Democratic	Allan Shivers (incumbent)	355,010	89.93%	▲5.21
Republican	Ralph W. Currie	39,737	10.07%	▼4.60
Write-in		26	0.00%	N/A
Majority		315,273	79.86%	▲9.81
Total votes		394,773	100.00%	
Democratic hold				

== Bibliography ==
- Gubernatorial Elections, 1787-1997. Washington, D.C.: Congressional Quarterly Inc. 1998. ISBN 1-56802-396-0.
- Texas Almanac and State Industrial Guide, 1952-1953. Dallas, Texas: A. H. Belo Corporation. 1951.
