= 49th Texas Legislature =

The 49th Texas Legislature met from January 9, 1945, to June 5, 1945. All members present during this session were elected in the 1944 general elections.

== Sessions ==
Regular Session: January 9, 1945 - June 5, 1945

== Party summary ==
=== Senate ===
| Affiliation | Members | Note |
|---|---|---|
| Democratic Party | 31 | |
| Total | 31 | |

=== House ===
| Affiliation | Members | Note |
|---|---|---|
| Democratic Party | 150 | |
| Total | 150 | |

== Officers ==
=== Senate ===
- Lieutenant Governor: John Lee Smith (D)
- President Pro Tempore: George C. Moffett (D), William Graves (D)

=== House ===
- Speaker of the House: Claud H. Gilmer (D)

== Members ==
=== Senate ===
Dist. 1

- Howard A. Carney (D), Atlanta

Dist. 2

- Wardlow Lane (D), Center

Dist. 3

- Ben Ramsey (D), San Augustine

Dist. 4

- Allan Shivers (D), Port Arthur

Dist. 5

- Roger A. Knight (D), Madisonville

Dist. 6

- James E. Taylor (D), Kerens

Dist. 7

- T. C. Chadick (D), Quitman

Dist. 8

- A. M. Aiken, Jr. (D), Paris

Dist. 9

- Charles R. Jones (D), Bonham

Dist. 10

- G. C. Morris (D), Greenville

Dist. 11

- William Graves (D), Dallas

Dist. 12

- A. B. Crawford (D), Granbury

Dist. 13

- Kyle Vick (D), Waco

Dist. 14

- Joseph Alton York (D), Bryan

Dist. 15

- Louis Sulak (D), La Grange

Dist. 16

- Weaver Moore (D), Houston

Dist. 17

- William Stone (D), Galveston

Dist. 18

- Fred Mauritz (D), Ganado

Dist. 19

- Rudolph A. Weinert (D), Seguin

Dist. 20

- James A. Stanford (D), Austin

Dist. 21

- Buster Brown (D), Temple

Dist. 22

- Royston Lanning (D), Jacksboro

Dist. 23

- George Moffett (D), Chillicothe

Dist. 24

- Pat Bullock (D), Colorado City

Dist. 25

- Penrose Metcalfe (D), San Angelo

Dist. 26

- J. Franklin Spears (D), San Antonio

Dist. 27

- Rogers Kelly (D), Edinburg

Dist. 28

- Jesse Martin (D), Fort Worth

Dist. 29

- Henry L. Winfield (D), Fort Stockton

Dist. 30

- Sterling J. Parrish (D), Lubbock

Dist. 31

- Grady Hazlewood (D), Amarillo

=== House ===
The House was composed of 150 Democrats.

House members included future Governor Preston Smith.

== Sources ==
- Legislative Reference Library of Texas,
