= 1946 Texas gubernatorial election =

- November 5, 1946
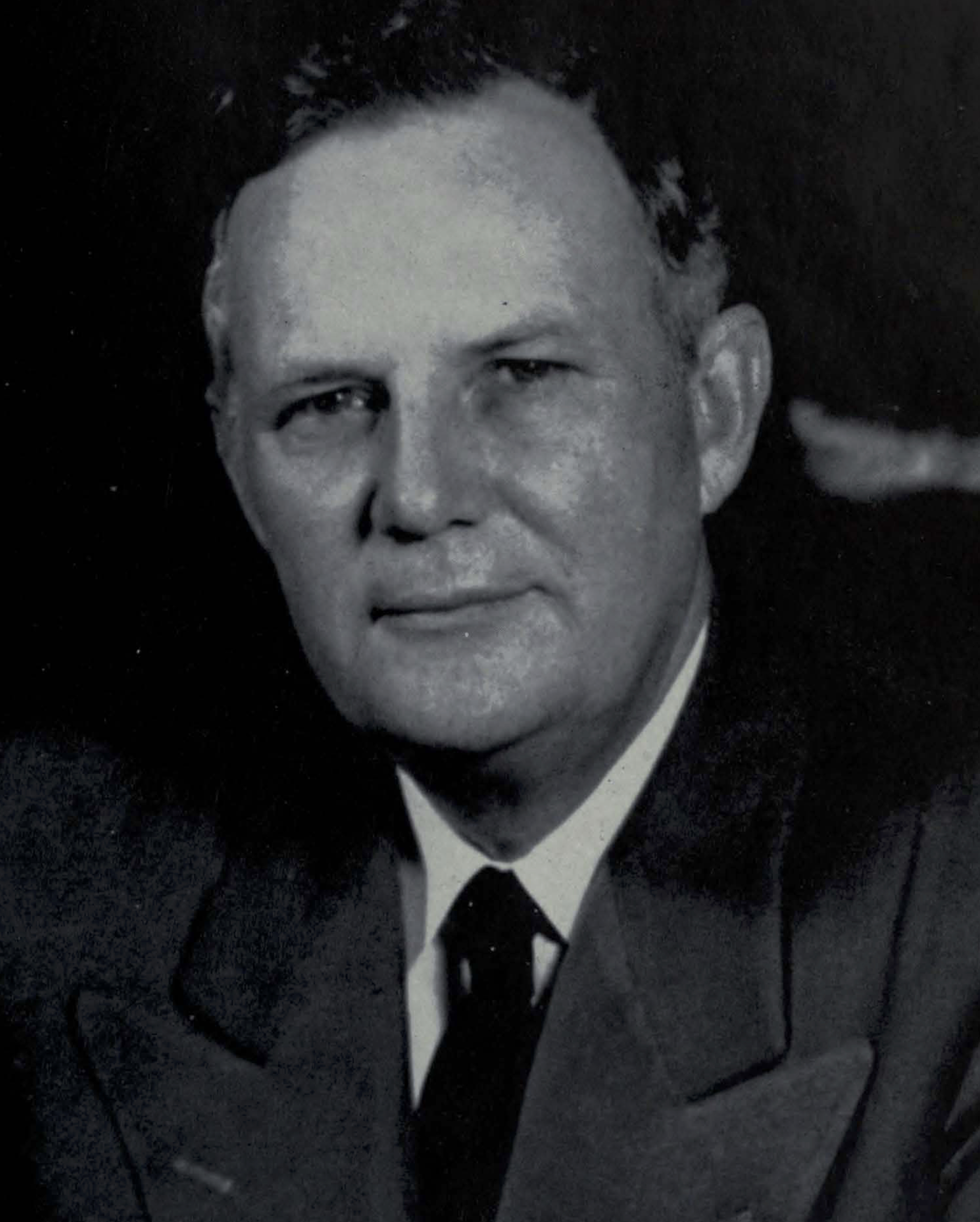

Nominee	Beauford H. Jester	Eugene Nolte Jr.
Party	Democratic	Republican
Popular vote	345,513	33,231
Percentage	91.23%	8.77%
- County results Jester: 50–60% 60–70% 70–80% 80–90% >90% No votes
Governor before election
Coke R. Stevenson
Democratic
Elected Governor
Beauford H. Jester
Democratic

The 1946 Texas gubernatorial election was held on November 5, 1946.

Incumbent Democratic Governor Coke R. Stevenson did not seek re-election.

Democratic Governor nominee Beauford H. Jester defeated Republican nominee Eugene Nolte, Jr. with 91.23% of the vote.

To date, this was the last election in which a candidate for Governor of Texas won more than 90% of the vote.

== Nominations ==
=== Democratic primary ===
The Democratic primary election was held on July 27, 1946, with the runoff held on August 24, 1946.

==== Candidates ====
- Floyd Brinkley
- William V. Brown, mayor of Texarkana
- A. J. Burks, mayor of Odessa
- Charles B. Hutchison
- Beauford H. Jester, Railroad Commissioner
- Caso March, former Baylor University law professor, World War II veteran
- Walter Scott McNutt, president of Jefferson College and independent candidate for Governor of Arkansas in 1938 and 1940
- Homer P. Rainey, former President of the University of Texas
- Jerry Sadler, former Railroad Commissioner
- Grover Sellers, incumbent Texas Attorney General
- C. R. Shaw
- John Lee Smith, incumbent Lieutenant Governor
- Reese Turner, former State Representative

==== Withdrew ====
- W. J. Minton, newspaper editor and unsuccessful candidate for Democratic nomination for Governor in 1944

==== Declined ====
- James V. Allred, former Governor
- W. Lee O'Daniel, incumbent U.S. Senator
- Coke R. Stevenson, incumbent Governor

==== Results ====
Democratic primary results
Party	Candidate	Votes	%
Democratic	Beauford H. Jester	448,304	38.15
Democratic	Homer P. Rainey	291,282	25.04
Democratic	Grover Sellers	162,431	13.96
Democratic	Jerry Sadler	103,120	8.87
Democratic	John Lee Smith	102,941	8.85
Democratic	Caso March	20,529	1.76
Democratic	C. R. Shaw	9,764	0.84
Democratic	Reese Turner	4,912	0.42
Democratic	A. J. Burks	4,881	0.42
Democratic	Charles B. Hutchison	4,616	0.40
Democratic	Walter S. McNutt	4,353	0.37
Democratic	Floyd Brinkley	4,249	0.37
Democratic	William V. Brown	3,902	0.34
Democratic	W. J. Minton (withdrawn)	2,398	0.21
Total votes		1,163,184	100.00

Democratic runoff results
Party	Candidate	Votes	%
Democratic	Beauford H. Jester	701,018	66.34
Democratic	Homer P. Rainey	355,654	33.68
Total votes		1,056,672	100.00

=== Republican nomination ===
The Republican state convention was held on August 13, 1946 at Mineral Wells.

==== Candidates ====
- Alvin H. Lane, attorney
- Eugene "Mike" Nolte, Jr., alcohol distributor

==== Results ====
Republican convention results
Party	Candidate	Votes	%
Republican	Eugene Nolte, Jr.	178	54.27
Republican	Alvin H. Lane	150	45.73
Total votes		328	100.00

== General election ==
General election results by county.: Jester 50–60% 70–80% 80–90% >90% / No vote

=== Candidates ===
- Beauford H. Jester, Democratic
- Eugene Nolte, Jr., Republican

=== Results ===
1946 Texas gubernatorial election
Party	Candidate	Votes	%	±%
Democratic	Beauford H. Jester	345,513	91.23%	▲0.28
Republican	Eugene Nolte, Jr.	33,231	8.77%	▼0.28
Majority		312,282	82.46%	▲0.56
Total votes		378,744	100.00%	
Democratic hold				

== Bibliography ==
- Gubernatorial Elections, 1787-1997. Washington, D.C.: Congressional Quarterly Inc. 1998. ISBN 1-56802-396-0.
- Texas Almanac, 1954-1955. Dallas, Texas: A. H. Belo Corporation. 1953.
