= 1948 Texas lieutenant gubernatorial election =

- November 2, 1948
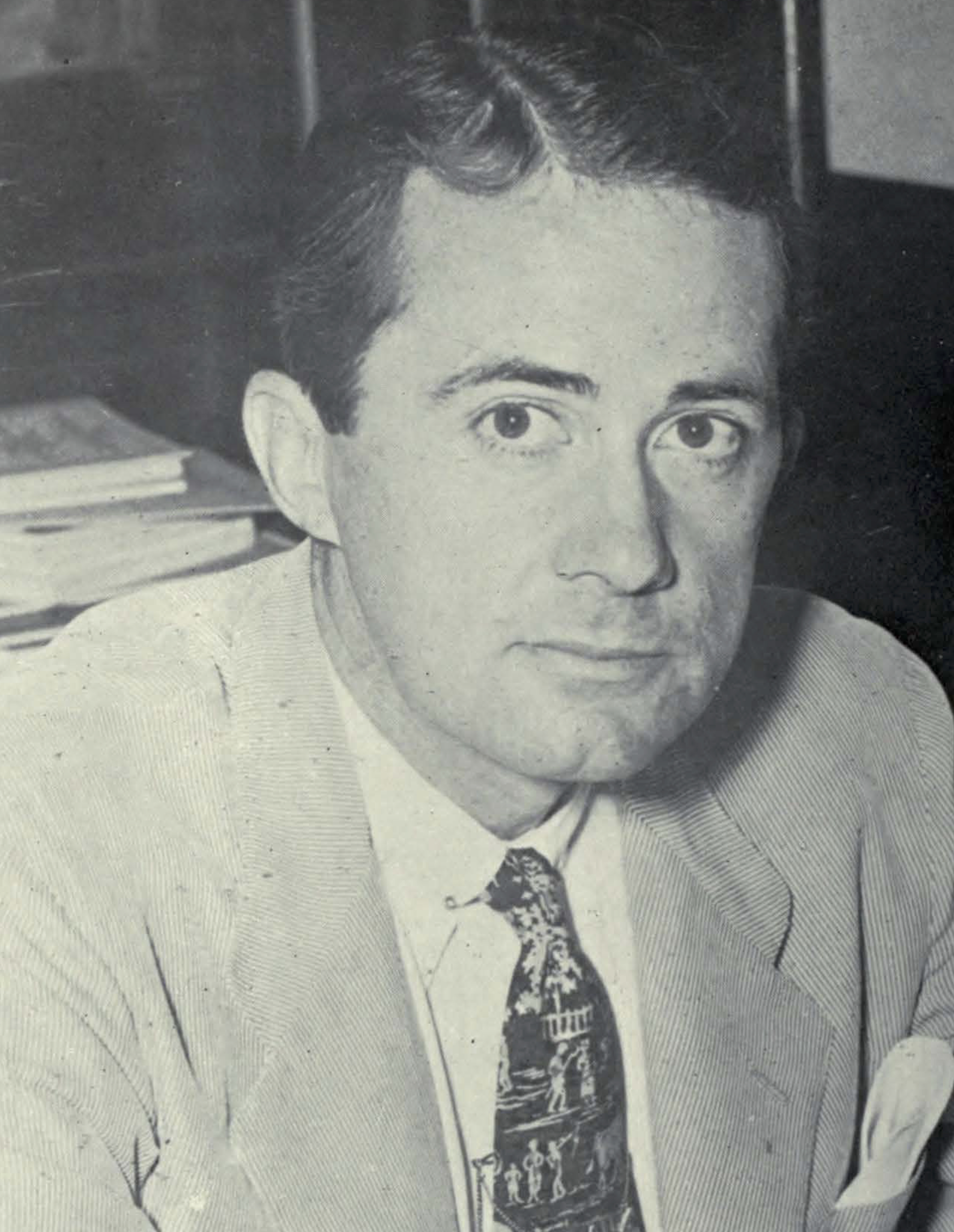

Nominee	Allan Shivers	Taylor Cole
Party	Democratic	Republican
Popular vote	1,050,163	143,887
Percentage	87.47%	11.98%
Lieutenant Governor before election
Allan Shivers
Democratic
Elected Lieutenant Governor
Allan Shivers
Democratic

The 1948 Texas lieutenant gubernatorial election was held on November 2, 1948, in order to elect the lieutenant governor of Texas. Incumbent Democratic lieutenant governor Allan Shivers defeated Republican nominee Taylor Cole, Progressive nominee Stacy Adams and Prohibition nominee Ira R. Lowe.

== General election ==
On election day, November 2, 1948, incumbent Democratic lieutenant governor Allan Shivers won re-election by a margin of 906,276 votes against his foremost opponent Republican nominee Taylor Cole, thereby retaining Democratic control over the office of lieutenant governor. Shivers was sworn in for his second term on January 18, 1949.

=== Results ===
Texas lieutenant gubernatorial election, 1948
Party	Candidate	Votes	%
Democratic	Allan Shivers (incumbent)	1,050,163	87.47
Republican	Taylor Cole	143,887	11.98
Progressive	Stacy Adams	3,434	0.29
Prohibition	Ira R. Lowe	3,177	0.26
	Scattering	5	0.00
Total votes		1,200,666	100.00
Democratic hold			
