= William Carey Graves =

American politician

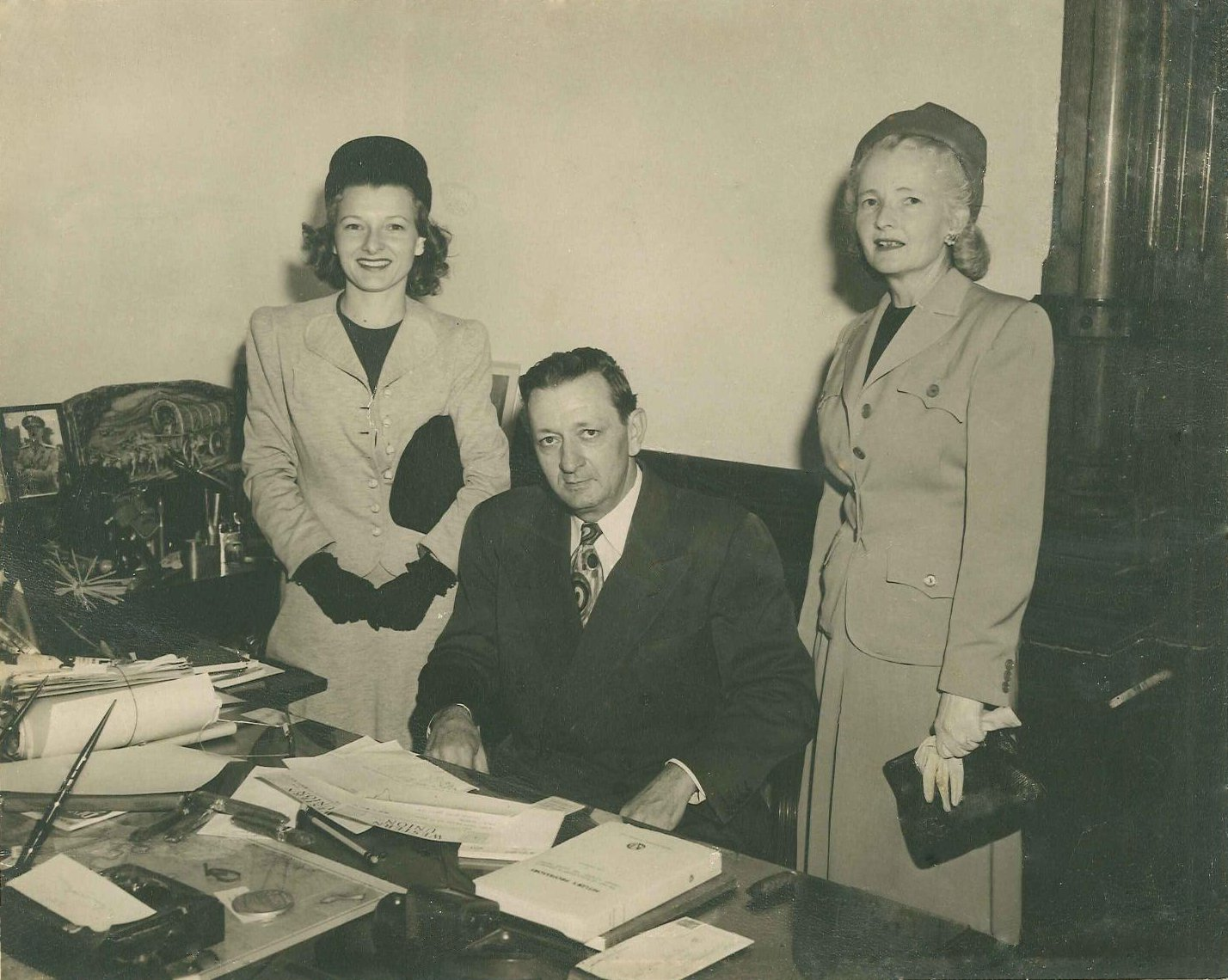
Senator Graves, Mrs Eloise Graves, daughter Maxine Graves Price, Capitol Building

William Carey Graves (December 1, 1895 in Washington Parish, Louisiana – January 26, 1966 in Dallas, Texas) was a Democratic Texas State Senator for 4 terms and Majority Leader & Senate President for two of those terms. Graves was Governor of Texas for a day.

== Education and early years ==
Carey Graves was educated in the public school system of Washington Parish, Louisiana. Graves' first job was that of farmer on his father's land. After graduating from High School, he married Elois Richardson Graves. He enlisted in the U.S. Navy as a Radio Operator on the U.S. Battleship New Jersey. In his spare time, he read the requirements to pass the Bar in the State of Texas. Elois and Cary Graves had one child, a daughter named Maxine Graves Price.

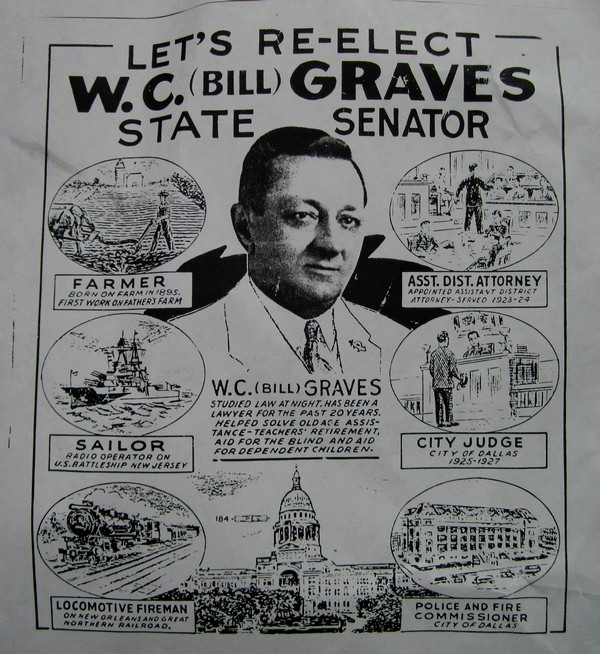
WC Graves 1940s Campaign flyer

== Legal and political career ==
Known politically as Bill Graves, Carey Graves arrived in Texas looking for every advantage a young state offered. Worked as a Locomotive Fireman on the New Orleans and Northern Railroad, while waiting on results from Texas State Bar Association. Graves passed the Bar Exam the first time he sat for it. As an attorney, he worked on Bills for Old Age Assistance, Teacher Retirement, and Aid for the Blind, Aid for Dependent Children.

== Career summary ==
- Assistant District Attorney of Dallas, Texas from 1920 to 1924

- City Judge, City of Dallas 1925-27

- Police and Fire Commissioner, City of Dallas, Texas. It was during Graves' time in office, he established a Criminal Investigation Department for Murder.

- Democratic Representative in the Texas Senate, from District 11

- Jan 10, 1939 - Jan 12, 1943 47th & 46th

- Jan 12, 1943 - Jan 14, 1947 49th & 48th Majority Leader, Senate President Pro Tem, Ad Interim.

- Charter member of the Bonehead Club of Dallas

- Board Member of the State Board of Education from 1953 to 1966.

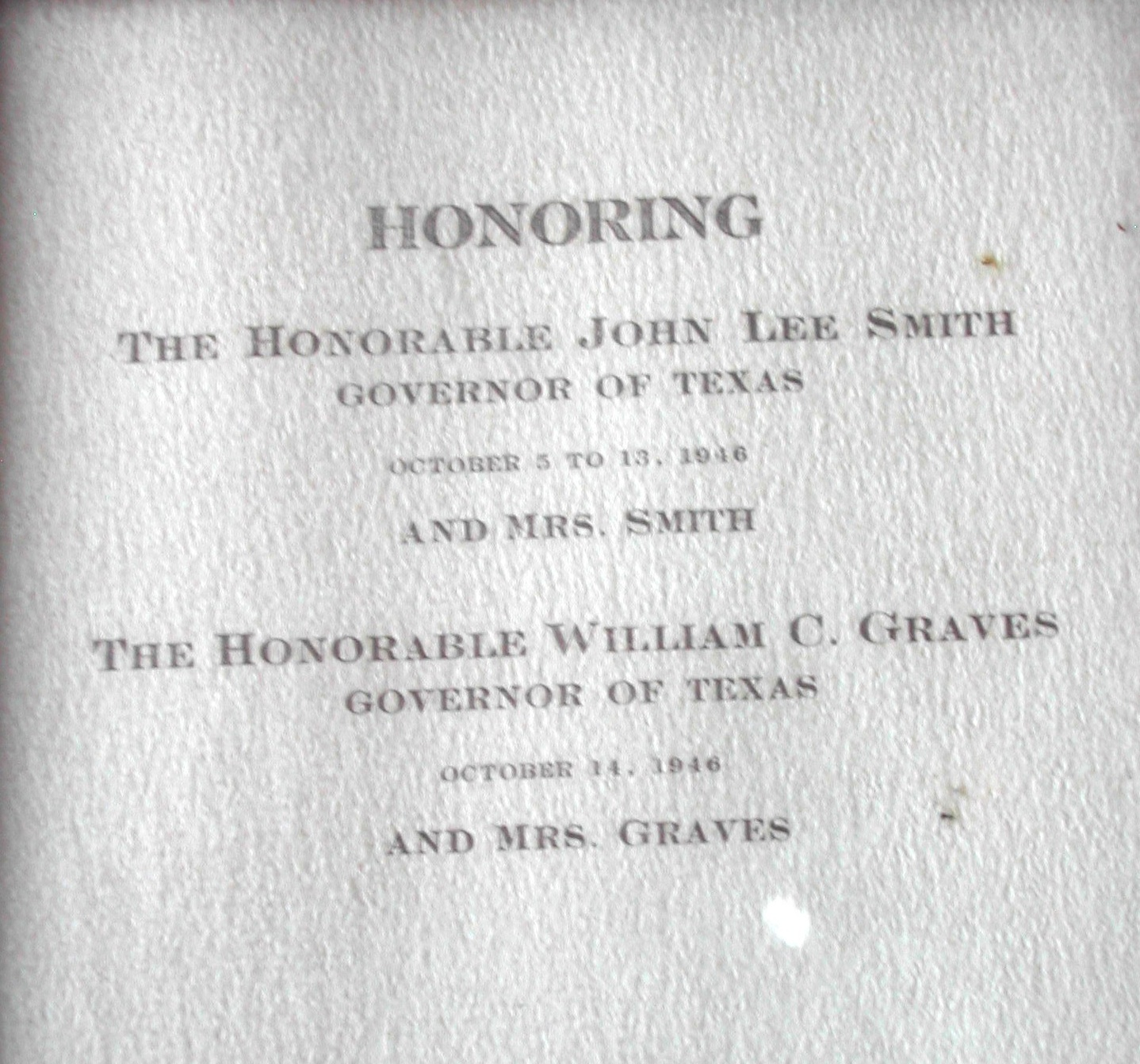
Governor of Texas Duty, with Texas State Seal

=== Governor of Texas for a Day ===
October 5–14, 1946, Texas Governor Coke R. Stevenson was called away from the State of Texas & on October 14, 1946 the Lieutenant Governor, John Lee Smith, was called away from the State of Texas; October 14, 1946 Senator Graves, as Majority Leader, was called to act as Texas Governor.

=== Committees served with the Texas Senate, District 11 ===
49th R.S. - 1945 Commerce and Manufacturing (vice chair) Constitutional Amendments Finance Highways and Motor Traffic Insurance (Chair) Internal Improvements (vice chair) Military Affairs Penitentiaries Public Health State Affairs Veterans' Affairs

48th R.S. - 1943 Assignment and Employment, Special Commerce and Manufacturing Constitutional Amendments (chair) Contingent Expense Counties and County Boundaries Criminal Jurisprudence Feed Shortage, Investigation, Special Finance Insurance Judicial Districts Military Affairs State Departments and Institutions State Penitentiaries

47th R.S. - 1941 Civil Jurisprudence Commerce and Manufactures (chair) Counties and County Boundaries Highways and Motor Traffic Insurance Labor (vice chair) Penitentiaries Public Health Public Printing State Affairs State Institutions and Departments

46th R.S. - 1939 Civil Jurisprudence Commerce and Manufacturing Federal Relations (chair) Highways and Motor Traffic Insurance Internal Improvements (chair) Nominations of Governor Privileges and Elections (vice chair) Rules State Affairs Towns and City Corporations
