= 1948 Texas gubernatorial election =

- November 2, 1948
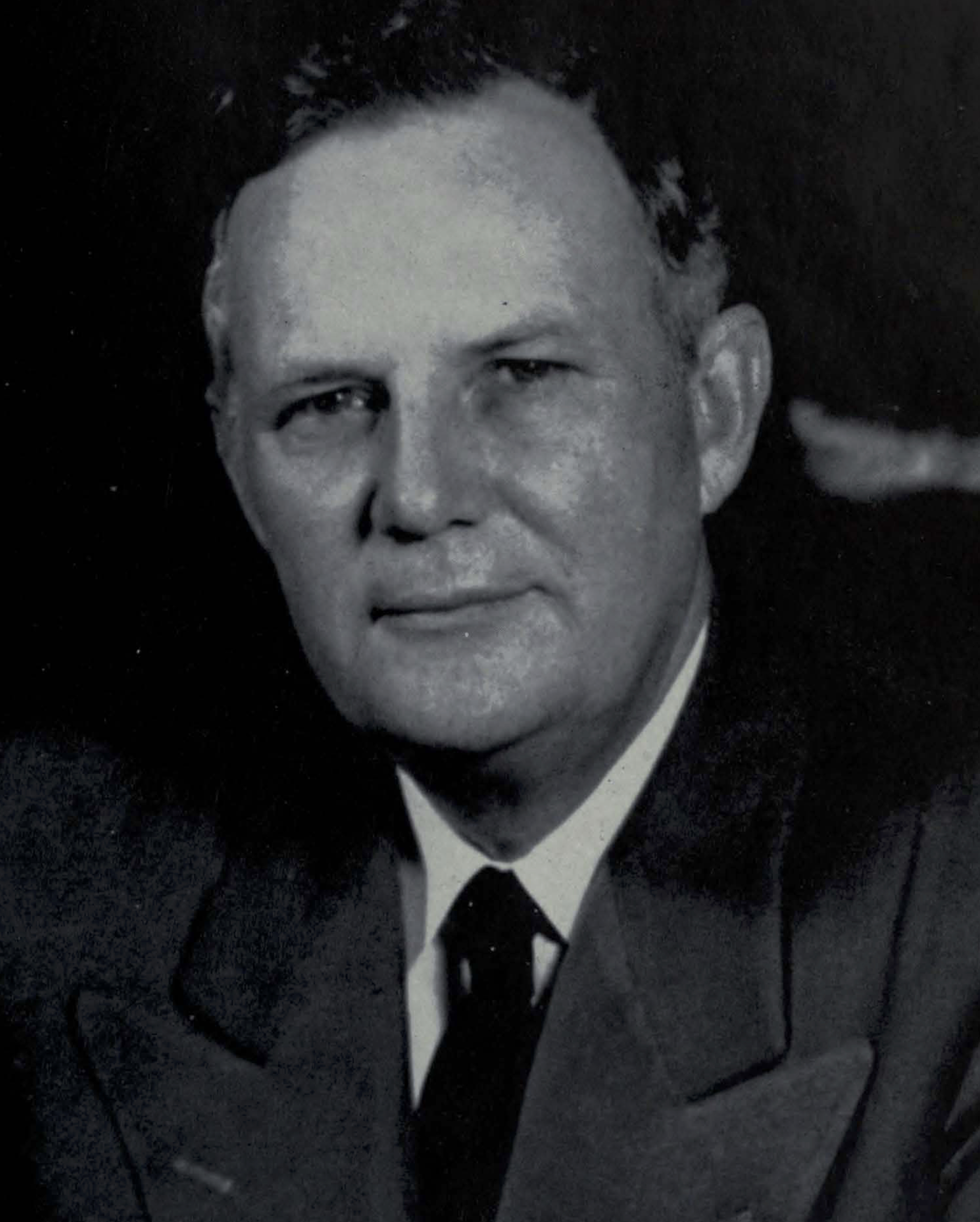

Nominee	Beauford H. Jester	Alvin H. Lane
Party	Democratic	Republican
Popular vote	1,024,160	177,399
Percentage	84.72%	14.67%
- County results Jester: 60–70% 70–80% 80–90% >90% Lane: 50–60%
Governor before election
Beauford H. Jester
Democratic
Elected Governor
Beauford H. Jester
Democratic

The 1948 Texas gubernatorial election was held on November 2, 1948.

Incumbent Democratic Governor Beauford H. Jester defeated Republican nominee Alvin H. Lane with 84.72% of the vote.

== Democratic primary ==
The Democratic primary election was held on July 24, 1948. By winning over 50% of the vote, Jester avoided a run-off which would have been held on August 28, 1948.

=== Candidates ===
- Roger Q. Evans, state representative and unsuccessful candidate for Democratic nomination for governor in 1932
- Beauford H. Jester, incumbent governor
- Charles B. Hutchison, unsuccessful candidate for Democratic nomination for governor in 1946
- Caso March, Baylor University law professor and unsuccessful candidate for Democratic nomination for governor in 1946
- Holmes A. May, merchant
- W. J. Minton, newspaper editor and unsuccessful candidate for Democratic nomination for governor in 1944 and 1946
- Sumpter W. Stockton

==== Withdrew ====
- Denver S. Whiteley (endorsed March)

==== Results ====
Democratic primary results
Party	Candidate	Votes	%
Democratic	Beauford H. Jester (incumbent)	642,025	53.27
Democratic	Roger Q. Evans	279,602	23.20
Democratic	Caso March	187,658	15.57
Democratic	Charles B. Hutchison	24,441	2.03
Democratic	Sumpter W. Stockton	21,243	1.76
Democratic	Holmes A. May	20,538	1.70
Democratic	Denver S. Whiteley (withdrawn)	16,090	1.34
Democratic	W. J. Minton	13,659	1.13
Democratic	Scattering	1	0.00
Total votes		1,202,257	100.00

== Republican nomination ==
The Republicans unanimously nominated Alvin H. Lane, attorney, at their convention on August 10, 1948.

== General election ==
=== Candidates ===
- Beauford H. Jester, incumbent governor (Democratic)
- Alvin H. Lane, attorney (Republican)
- Gerald Overholt, pastor (Prohibition)
- Herman Wright, attorney (Progressive)

=== Results ===
1948 Texas gubernatorial election
Party	Candidate	Votes	%	±%
Democratic	Beauford H. Jester (incumbent)	1,024,160	84.72%	▼6.51
Republican	Alvin H. Lane	177,399	14.67%	▲5.90
Progressive	Herman Wright	3,747	0.31%	N/A
Prohibition	Gerald Overholt	3,554	0.29%	N/A
Majority		846,761	70.05%	▼12.41
Total votes		1,208,860	100.00%	
Democratic hold				

== Bibliography ==
- Gubernatorial Elections, 1787-1997. Washington, D.C.: Congressional Quarterly Inc. 1998. ISBN 1-56802-396-0.
- Texas Almanac, 1954-1955. Dallas, Texas: A. H. Belo Corporation. 1953.
