= Lovelady High School =

- Official website photo
- 11839 Texas State Highway 19 South; Lovelady, Texas, United States; 75851; United States

Information
- School type: Public high school
- Motto: Excellence in both academics and athletics.
- School district: Lovelady Independent School District
- Superintendent: Wendy Tullos
- NCES School ID: 482841003170
- Principal: Jo Beth Martinez
- Teaching staff: 24.54 (on FTE basis)
- Grades: 7 to 12
- Enrollment: 270 (2023-2024)
- Student to teacher ratio: 11.00
- Colors: Maroon and White
- Athletics conference: UIL Class AA
- Mascot: Leo the Lion
- Nickname: Lions/Lady Lions
- Yearbook: Lion's Paw
- Website: Lovelady Jr. High/High School

Lovelady High School is a high school located in Lovelady, Texas

== Athletics ==
The Lovelady Lions compete in the following sports -

Cross Country, Volleyball, Football, Basketball, Golf, Baseball, Softball, and Track

== Notable alumni ==
- Homer Rainey (January 19, 1896 - December 19, 1985): Former University of Texas president (1939-1944), 1913 graduate of Lovelady High School.
- Charles Harrelson, hitman and father of Woody Harrelson, briefly attended Lovelady High school, before transferring to Huntsville where he dropped out.
- Paul Wakefield-General, journalist, political aide (most notably, Vice President John Nance Garner).
- Myrtle Mainer Neff- First Lady of Texas
- Boudreaux Campbell - Bull rider.
