= 1954 Texas gubernatorial election =

- November 2, 1954
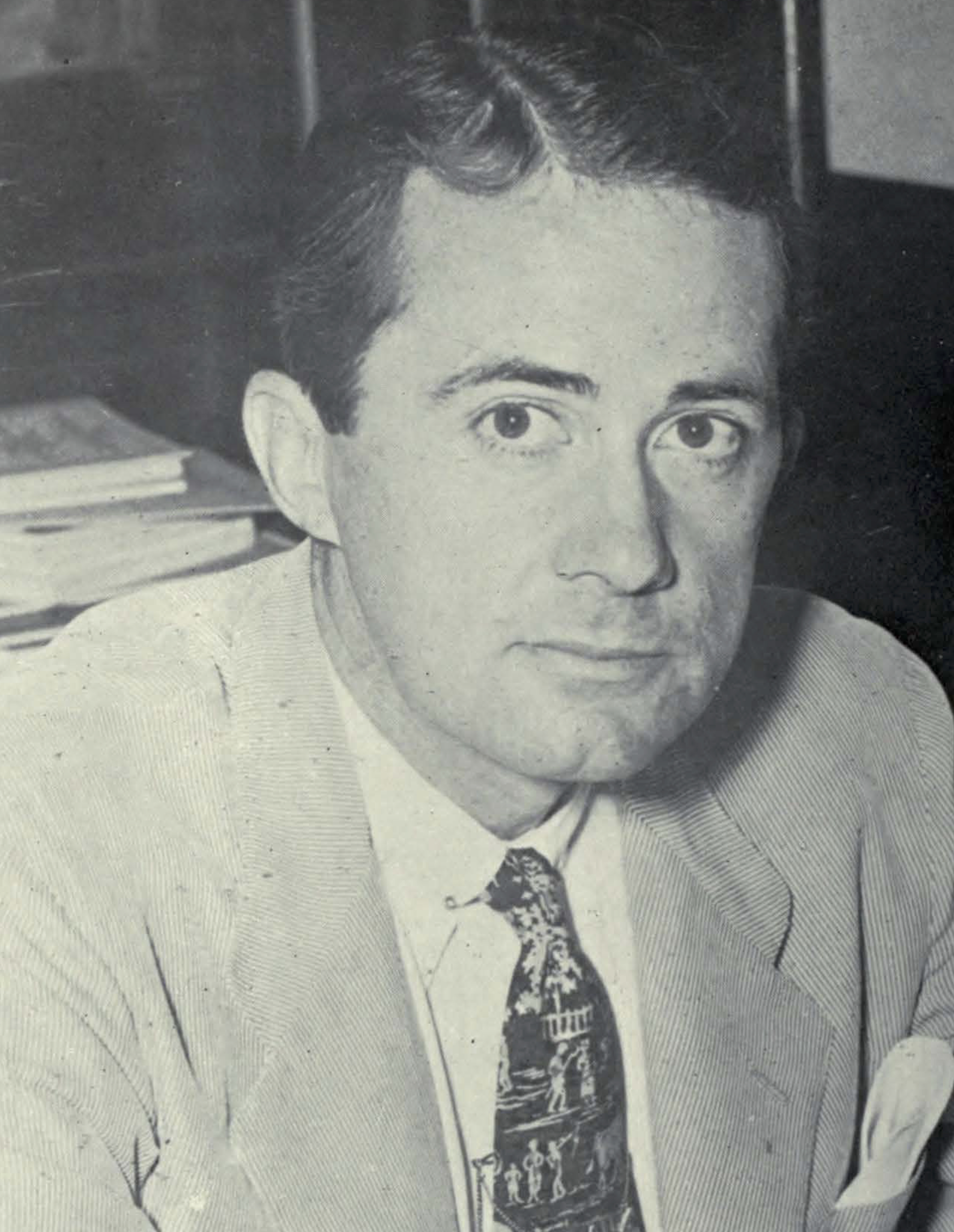

Nominee	Allan Shivers	Tod R. Adams
Party	Democratic	Republican
Popular vote	569,533	66,154
Percentage	89.42%	10.39%
- County results Shivers: 50–60% 60–70% 70–80% 80–90% >90%
Governor before election
Allan Shivers
Democratic
Elected Governor
Allan Shivers
Democratic

The 1954 Texas gubernatorial election was held on November 2, 1954, to elect the governor of Texas. Incumbent Democratic governor Allan Shivers was overwhelmingly reelected in the general election after defeating future senator Ralph Yarborough in the Democratic primary.

== Primaries ==
=== Democratic ===
Democratic primary results
Party	Candidate	Votes	%
Democratic	Allan Shivers (Inc.)	668,913	49.52%
Democratic	Ralph Yarborough	645,994	47.82%
Democratic	J. J. Holmes	19,591	1.45%
Democratic	Arlon B. Davis Jr.	16,254	1.20%
Total votes		1,350,752	100.00%

Democratic runoff results
Party	Candidate	Votes	%
Democratic	Allan Shivers (incumbent)	775,088	53.15%
Democratic	Ralph Yarborough	683,132	46.85%
Total votes		1,458,220	100.00%

County results Shivers: 50–60% 60–70% 70–80% 80–90% >90% Yarborough: 50–60% 60–70% 70–80%

== Results ==
General election results
Party	Candidate	Votes	%
Democratic	Allan Shivers (incumbent)	569,533	89.42%
Republican	Tod R. Adams	66,154	10.39%
Total votes		636,892	100.00%
Democratic hold			
