= Beauford H. Jester =

Governor of Texas from 1947 to 1949

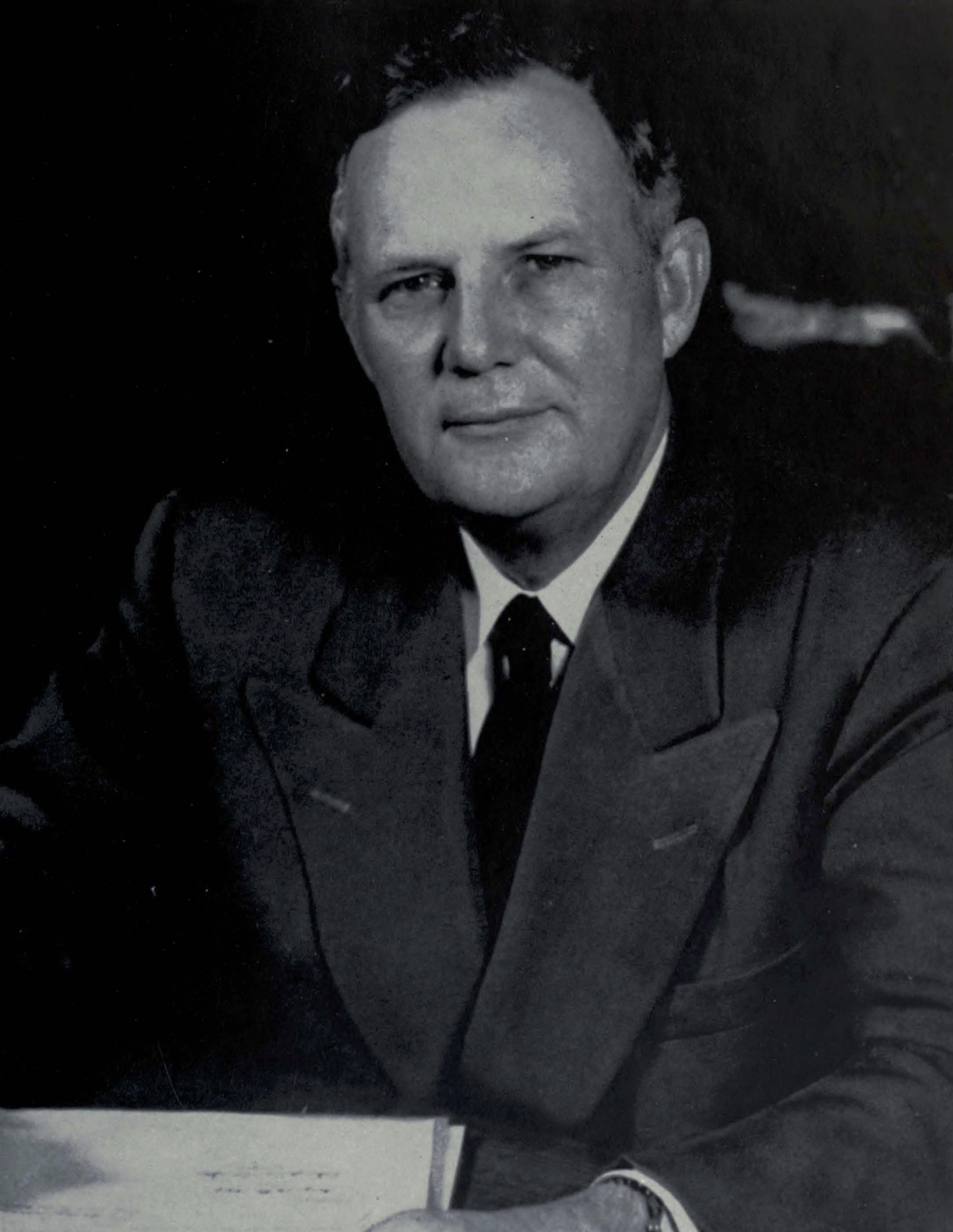

36th Governor of Texas
- In office January 21, 1947 – July 11, 1949
- Lieutenant: Allan Shivers
- Preceded by: Coke R. Stevenson
- Succeeded by: Allan Shivers

Railroad Commissioner of Texas
- In office January 1, 1943 – January 21, 1947
- Governor: Coke R. Stevenson
- Preceded by: Jerry Sadler
- Succeeded by: William J. Murray

Personal details
- Born: January 12, 1893 Corsicana, Texas, U.S.
- Died: July 11, 1949 (aged 56) Houston, Texas, U.S.
- Party: Democratic
- Spouse: Mabel Buchanan (m. 1921)
- Children: 3
- Parent: George Taylor Jester (father)
- Education: University of Texas at Austin (AB, LLB); Harvard University

Military service
- Allegiance: United States
- Branch/service: United States Army
- Years of service: 1917–1918
- Rank: Captain
- Battles/wars: World War I

Beauford Halbert Jester (January 12, 1893 – July 11, 1949) was an American politician who served as the 36th governor of Texas from 1947 until his death in office in 1949. He is the only Texas governor ever to have died in office. Jester was a veteran of World War I and known for reforms of prisons and the educational system of the state.

== Early life, education, and marriage ==
Jester was born in 1893 to George Taylor Jester and his wife, Frances P. Gordon, in Corsicana, Texas, the seat of Navarro County in east Texas. He attended local segregated schools. Jester attended the University of Texas at Austin, then also segregated, where he was a member of Kappa Sigma fraternity.

Jester later studied law at Harvard in Cambridge, Massachusetts. His studies were interrupted by the First World War.

After the United States entered World War I, he joined the US Army, eventually achieving the rank of captain, and serving from 1917 to 1918. He commanded Company D of the 357th Infantry, 90th Division from organization to demobilization. His unit saw participation in St. Mihiel Offensive and Meuse-Argonne Offensive.

In 1919, Jester resumed his law studies at the University of Texas, from which he received his Bachelor of Laws a year later.

He married Mabel Buchanan on June 15, 1921.

== Law career ==
He returned to Corsicana to practice law. There, he also served as president of the Navarro County Bar Association for many years. Jester also served as director of the state bar association from 1940 to 1941.

From 1929 to 1935, Jester was a member of the University of Texas Board of Regents. From 1933 to 1935, he served as the chairman of that body.

== Political career ==
A Democrat, Jester first won statewide elective office in 1942, when elected to the Texas Railroad Commission. He served until January 1947.

He decided to run for governor, winning the Democratic primary in a run-off election in 1946 by defeating Homer Rainey.

As governor, Jester created the Board of Texas State Hospitals and Special Schools, the Texas Youth Development Council, and reformed the state prison system. He also increased funding for state hospitals and orphanages, enacted strong right-to-work laws, and supported an antilynching law.

Jester was easily re-elected to a second term in 1948. He helped implement the most extensive education reforms in the state through the 1949 Gilmer-Aiken Act, the first comprehensive system for Texas school funding. It was a series of bills passed in 1949 by the Texas Legislature aimed at reforming the state's public school system. These laws significantly impacted Texas education by raising teacher salaries, consolidating school districts, and providing state funding for equalization. The Gilmer-Aikin Act also established the Texas Education Agency and guaranteed all Texas children the opportunity to attend public school for twelve years.

Jester died unexpectedly of a heart attack on a train on July 11, 1949. He is the only Texas governor to die in office. Jester's body was returned to his hometown of Corsicana, where he is interred in Oakwood Cemetery.

From 1940 until Jester's death in 1949, singer Caroline Roget was Jester's secretary and romantic partner, according to papers at the Texas State Archives

== Legacy and honors ==
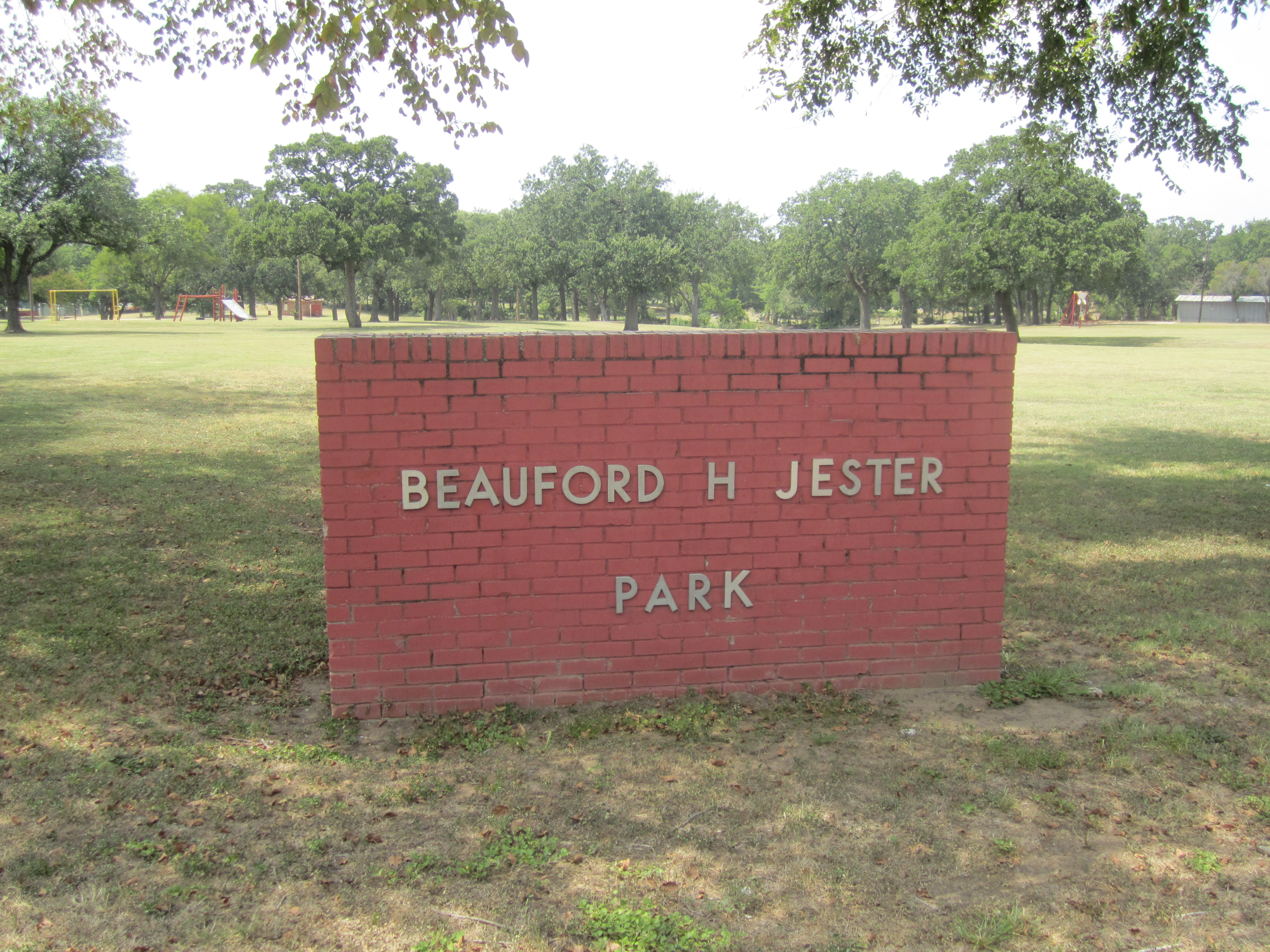
Beauford H. Jester Park in Corsicana, Texas

- In the 1950s, the Texas Department of Corrections complex of prisons, the Jester Prison Farm, was named after Jester to honor his efforts at prison reform.
- In 1964, Jester Park was dedicated by the City of Corsicana in memory of Beauford Jester. The 24-acre (97,000 m^{2}) park is home to the Lefty Frizzell Memorial and the Pioneer Village, which recreates the lives of the city's pioneers with replicas of historic buildings.
- In 1968, the Jester Center on the University of Texas campus was named after him. This contains Jester Dormitory, formerly the largest college residential facility in the world, housing just under 3,000 students, as well as classroom and faculty space.
- Land formerly owned by Jester in the Hill Country just west of Austin (now incorporated into Austin) was developed as "Jester Estates", a neighborhood now of about 1,000 homes. The two major streets entering the neighborhood are Beauford Drive and Jester Boulevard. The neighborhood runs along a ridge of the Balcones Plateau, and is surrounded on three sides by protected endangered-species habitat.

Party political offices
Preceded by Coke R. Stevenson	Democratic nominee for Governor of Texas; 1946, 1948	Succeeded by Allan Shivers
Political offices
Preceded by Coke R. Stevenson	Governor of Texas; January 21, 1947 – July 11, 1949	Succeeded by Allan Shivers
Preceded by Jerry Sadler	Texas Railroad Commissioner; 1943–1947	Succeeded by William J. Murray
