= 1952 Texas gubernatorial election =

- November 4, 1952
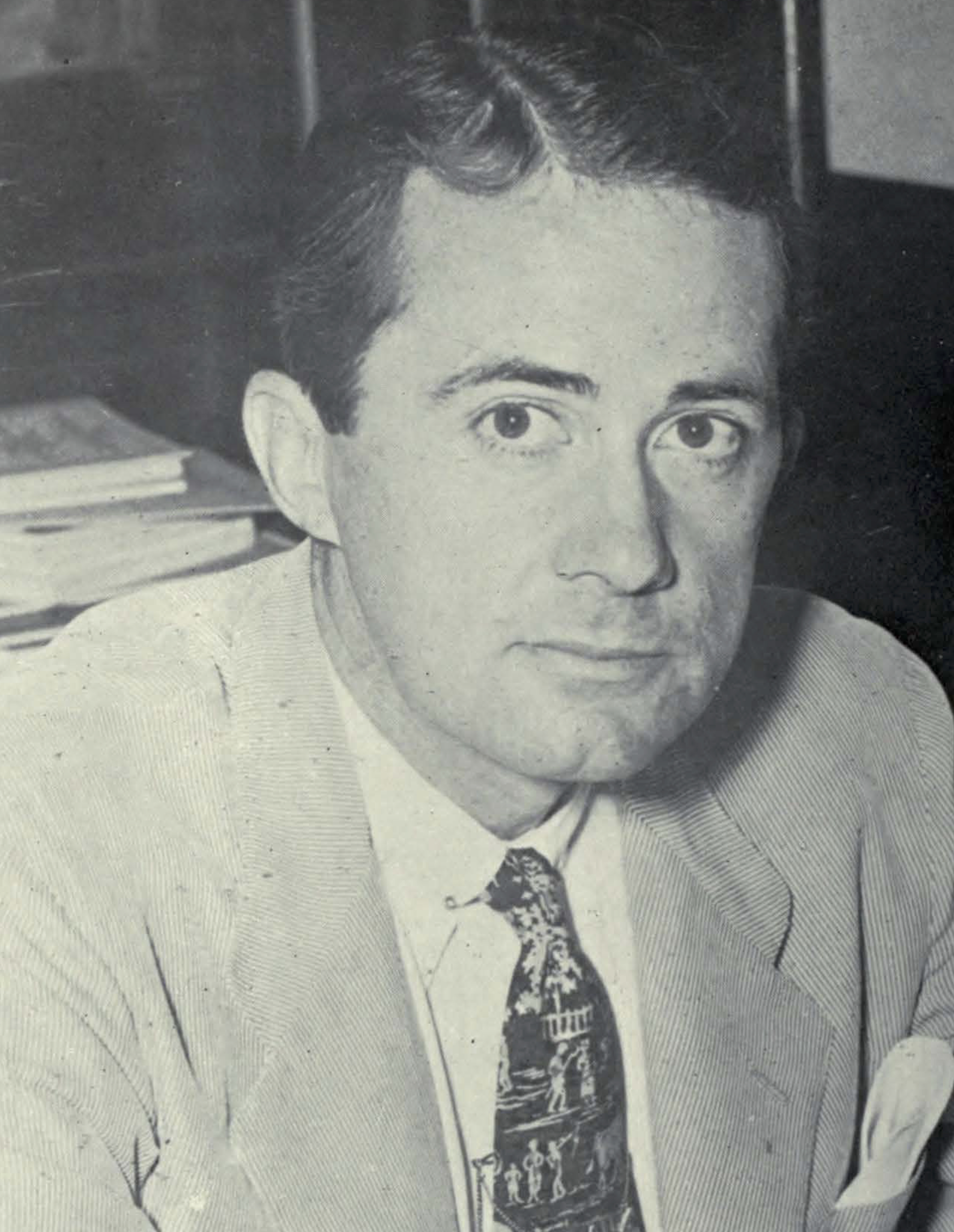

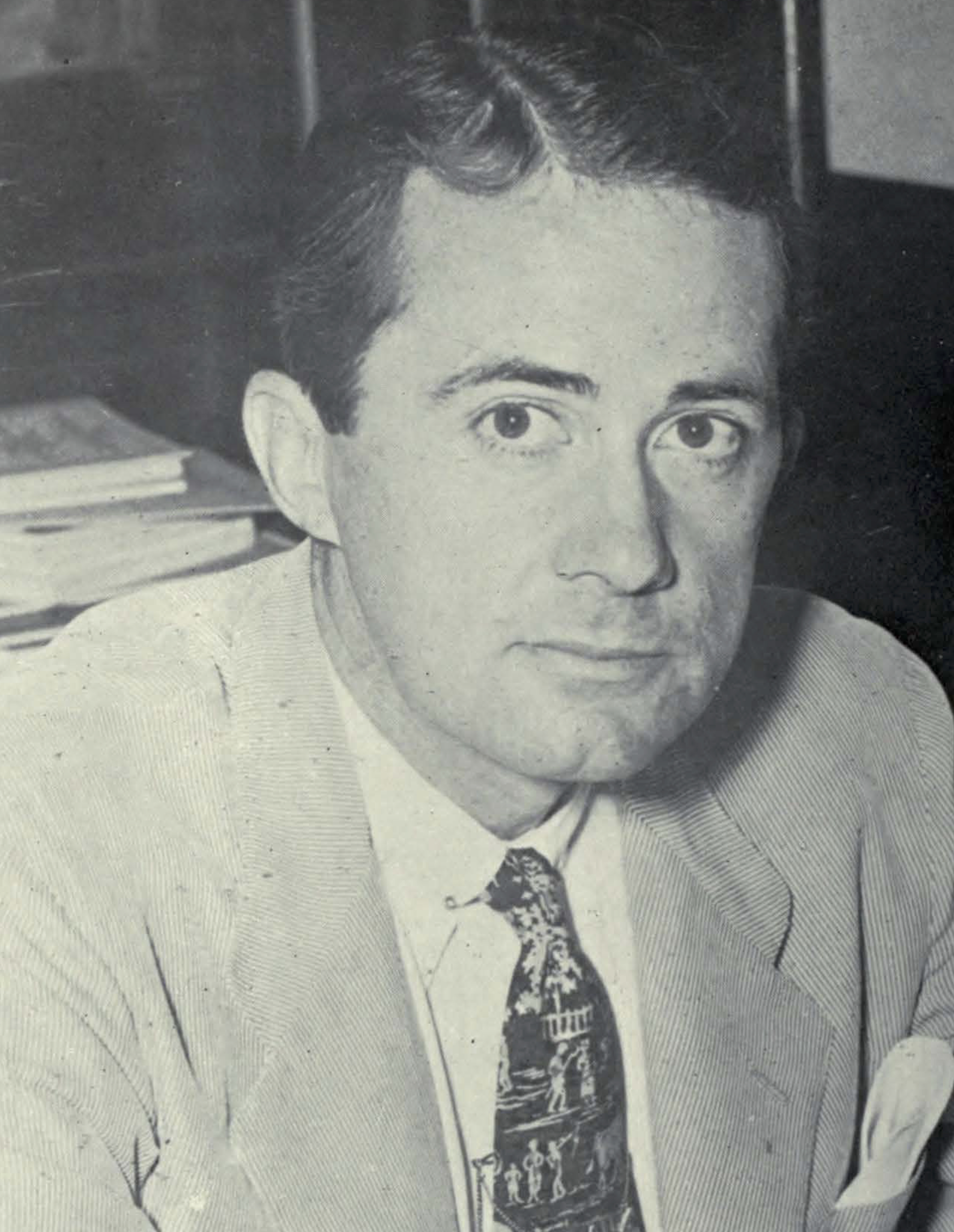
Nominee	Allan Shivers	Allan Shivers (Note: Shivers and the entire state Democratic ticket were endorsed by the state Republican party and appeared on their ballots)
Party	Democratic	Republican
Popular vote	1,375,547	468,319
Percentage	73.12%	24.89%
- County results Democratic: 50–60% 60–70% 70–80% 80–90% >90% Republican: 50–60% 60–70%
Governor before election
Allan Shivers
Democratic
Elected Governor
Allan Shivers
Democratic

The 1952 Texas gubernatorial election was held on November 4, 1952.

Incumbent Democratic Governor Allan Shivers was overwhelmingly reelected in the general election after defeating future Senator Ralph Yarborough in the Democratic primary. The Republican Party endorsed the Democratic state ticket, including Shivers, in order to attract more votes for their presidential nominee, General Dwight D. Eisenhower.

== Primary elections ==
Primary elections were held on July 26, 1952.

=== Democratic primary ===
==== Candidates ====
- Allan Shivers, incumbent Governor
- Allene M. Traylor, housewife
- Ralph W. Yarborough, attorney

==== Results ====
Primary results by county: Shivers: 40–50%; 50–60%; 60–70%; 70–80%; 80–90%; >90%; Yarborough: 40–50%; 50–60%; 60–0%; 70–80%

Democratic primary results
Party	Candidate	Votes	%
Democratic	Allan Shivers (incumbent)	833,861	61.48%
Democratic	Ralph Yarborough	488,345	36.00%
Democratic	Allene M. Traylor	34,186	2.52%
Total votes		1,356,392	100.00%

== General election ==
=== Candidates ===
Shivers endorsed the Republican nominee for President, Dwight D. Eisenhower, in the concurrent presidential election. In an attempt to maximize support for Eisenhower, the state Republican Party nominated the Democratic state ticket, allowing voters to cast a straight GOP ballot without voting against the down-ballot Democratic candidates.

=== Results ===
1952 Texas gubernatorial election
Party	Candidate	Votes	%
Democratic	Allan Shivers (incumbent)	1,375,547	73.12%
Republican	Allan Shivers (incumbent)	468,319	24.89%
No party	Allan Shivers (incumbent)	664	0.04%
Total	Allan Shivers (incumbent)	1,844,530	98.05%
Write-in		36,672	1.95%
Total votes		1,881,202	100.00%
Majority		1,807,858	96.10%
Democratic hold			

== Bibliography ==
- Gubernatorial Elections, 1787-1997. Washington, D.C.: Congressional Quarterly Inc. 1998. ISBN 1-56802-396-0.
- Texas Almanac, 1954-1955. Dallas, Texas: A. H. Belo Corporation. 1953.
