= Jester Center =

Residence hall of the University of Texas at Austin

Coordinates: 30°16′58″N 97°44′11″W

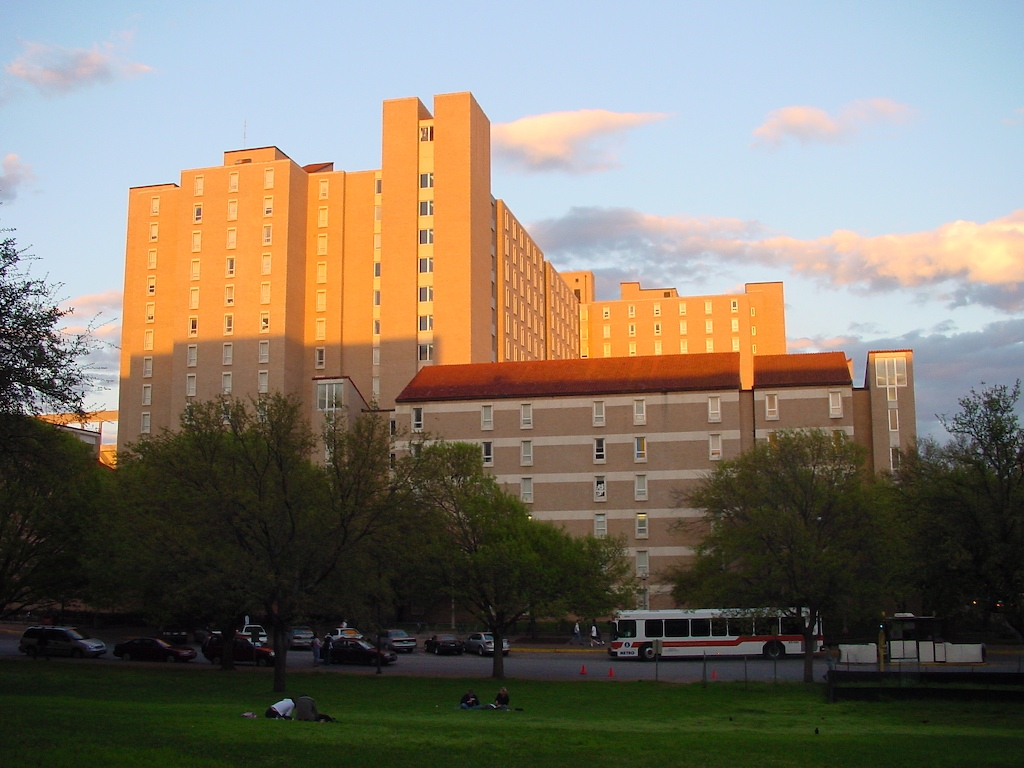
Jester Center

Jester Center or Jester Center Residence Halls is a co-educational residence hall at The University of Texas at Austin, built in 1969. The residence hall was named after Beauford H. Jester, who served as the Governor of Texas from 1947 until 1949.

== Facilities ==
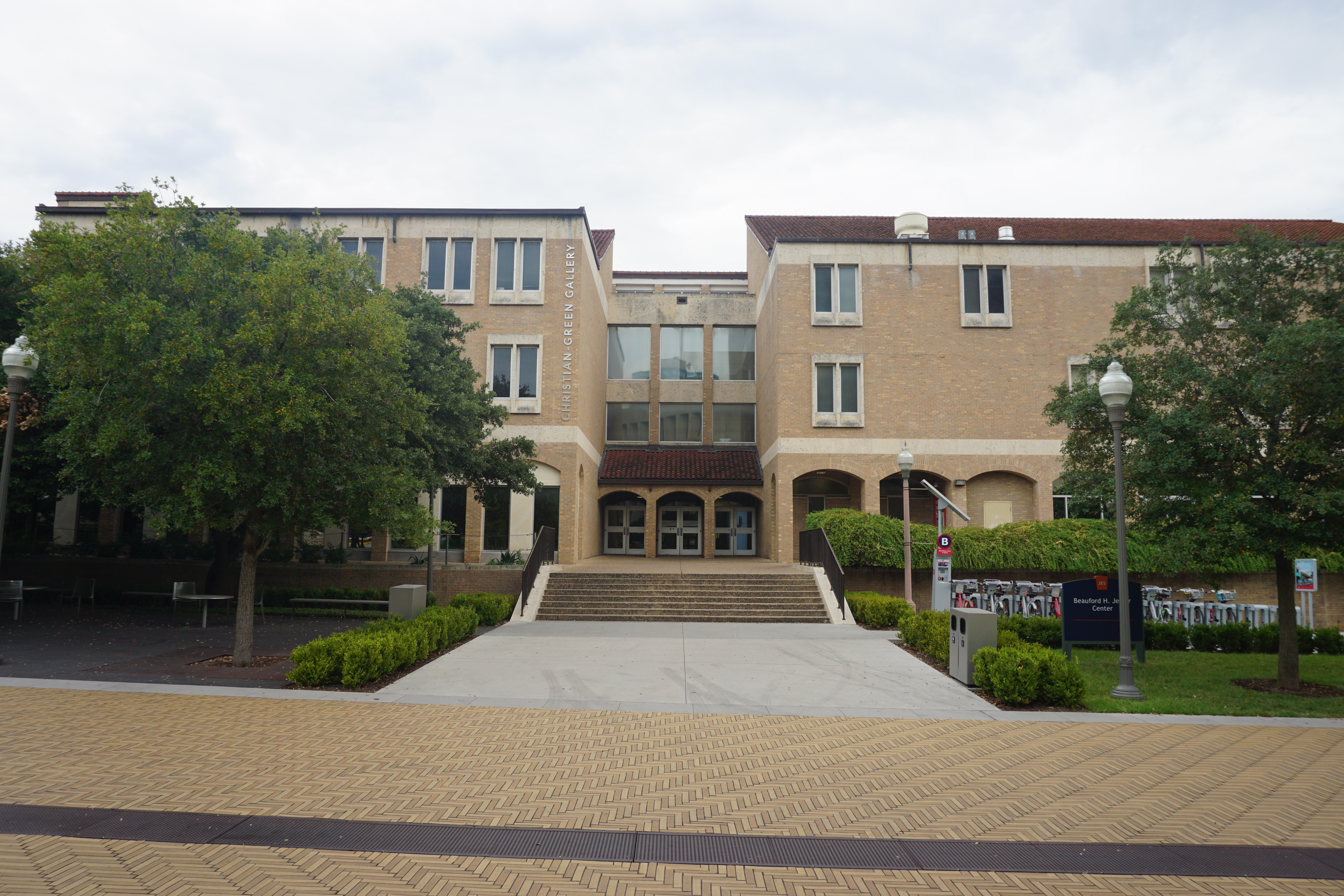
Beauford H. Jester Center

With a capacity of 3,200 (3,300 with supplemental housing) students, it was the largest residence hall in North America at the time it was built. The building complex, which occupies a full city block, was the largest building in Austin, Texas when built and was the largest building project in University history.

The complex includes two towers: a 14-level residence (Jester West) and a 10-level residence (Jester East). During the early 2010s, Jester underwent renovations that included disposition of the previously built-in furniture. While some rooms have private or connecting baths, most students use community restroom facilities. Each tower also has study rooms, lounges, laundry rooms, and storage areas. From time to time, some study lounges have been converted into "supplemental housing", where 4+ students who were not allotted a standard residence hall room are roomed together.

The residence hall also houses several offices for student services, tutoring, mentoring, academic advising, classrooms, and lecture halls. The center contains two dining halls, J2 Dining (signifying its location on the 2nd floor) and "Jester City Limits" (an allusion to Austin City Limits). Additionally, the center has a Wendy's (colloquially referred to as "Jendy's"), a convenience store named "Jester City Market", Jesta' Pizza, and Jester Java, which serves Starbucks.

== Features ==
Baby grand pianos are located on the second floor of Jester West and on the first floor of Jester East, off the lobby, for the enjoyment of the residents.

The Fireplace Lounge in Jester West and the First Floor Lobby in Jester East feature large-screen televisions and comfortable chairs.

Residents often use the numerous lounge areas as meeting places or group study areas. At least one lounge is located on each floor, but there is also a 24-hour quiet study lounge across from the Jester West Desk.

Jester is located right across the street from the Perry–Castañeda Library, Gregory Gymnasium, Lee and Joe Jamail Texas Swimming Center, and many academic buildings.

Jester has a variety of room types. It is roughly half double rooms with community bath and half double rooms with connecting bath. There are two double rooms with a private bath on each floor. Jester also has several triple rooms and single rooms throughout the hall. Finally, Jester houses a significant number of students in supplemental housing spaces at the beginning of each semester. These rooms are study lounges made to house four students and are generally so popular that it's hard to get students to move out of them when permanent spaces become available.

Jester Center also houses the Learning Center, the Center for African and African-American Studies, an Engineering, Communications and Natural Sciences advising office, the Career Exploration Center and many classrooms. It is not uncommon for students to live and attend classes within Jester.

The Jester East front desk offers students the option to check out DVDs for forty-eight hours at a time.

Jester houses one large computer lab in Jester West, where residents may write papers, finish homework or complete projects.

== Urban legends ==
According to student folklore, the structure was designed by an architect who specialized in prison design, specifically women's prisons due to the shower heads being placed fairly low (folklore c. at least 1983). It is true that Jester once had its own ZIP code, 78787; this was changed c. 1986. Currently, the University as a whole makes up a large part of the 78705 ZIP code, and Jester residence hall serves as a polling place for Precinct 148 in Texas Congressional District 21.

Jester Center was occasionally featured—particularly in panning the dorm's dining facilities—in artist Berkeley Breathed's comic strip The Academia Waltz, which was published in The Daily Texan in 1978-79, when Breathed was a UT undergrad. The strip was the predecessor to Breathed's famous Bloom County comic.
