= Homer P. Rainey =

American academic administrator

Homer Price Rainey
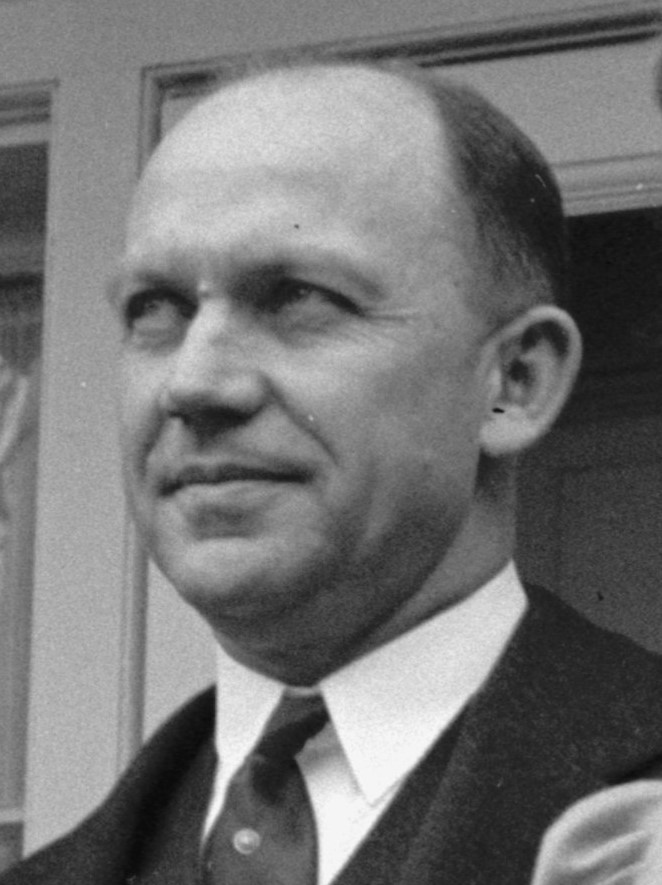
- Rainey in 1939
- Born: January 19, 1896; Clarksville, Texas
- Died: December 19, 1985 (aged 89); Boulder, Colorado
- Resting place: Mountain View Memorial Park, Boulder, Colorado
- Education: Lovelady High School Austin College (B.A) University of Chicago (M.A., Ph.D)
- Occupations: University President, Clergyman, Politician
- Known for: Being Fired After his Support for Academic Freedom as the President of the University of Texas
- Political party: Democratic

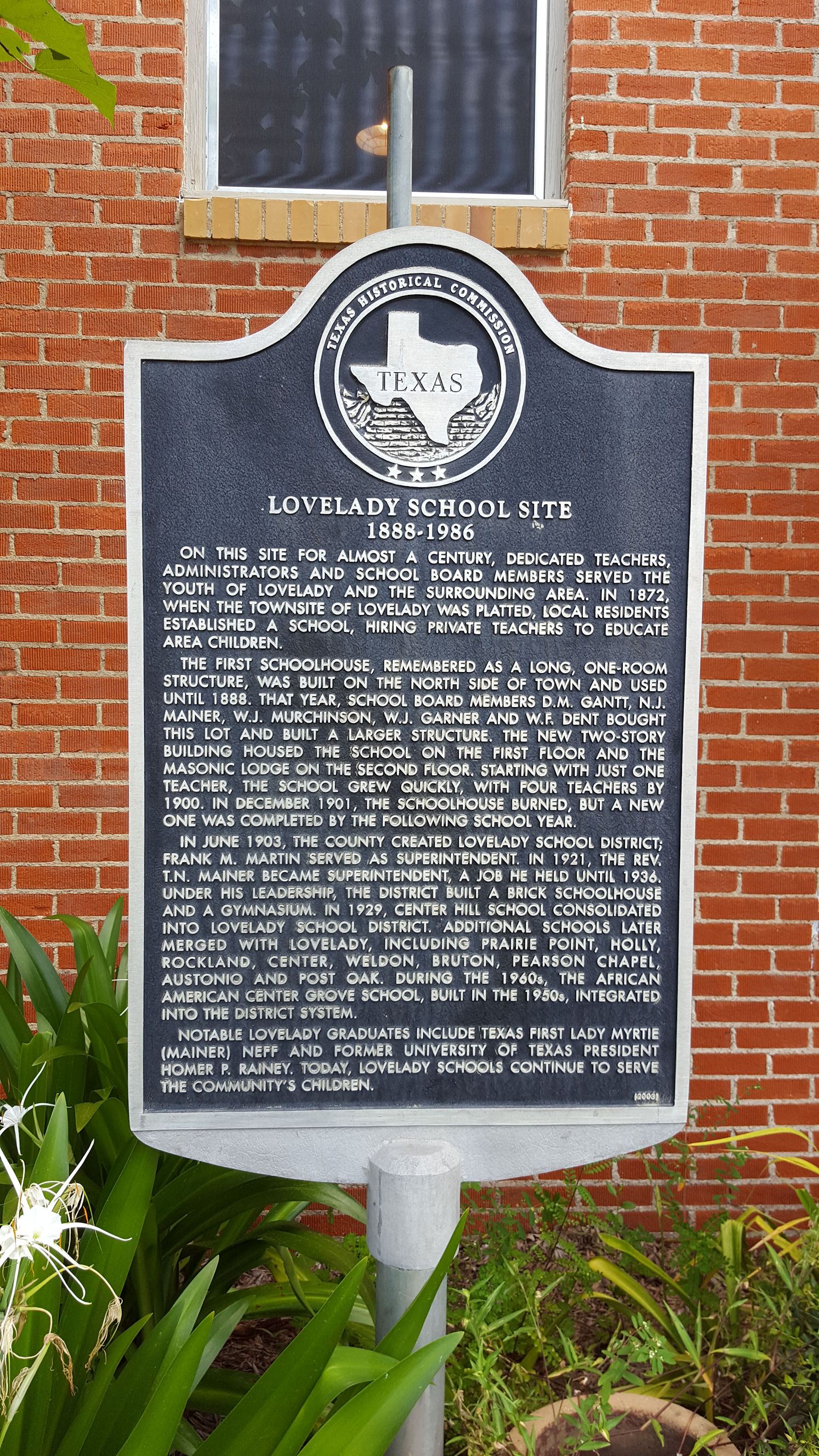
Historical marker at Lovelady's Old Gym acknowledging Rainey as a "notable graduate" of Lovelady High School

Homer Price Rainey (January 19, 1896 – December 19, 1985) was an American college professor, administrator, minister, and politician. He served as the president of several universities, most notably the University of Texas at Austin from 1939 to 1944.

== Early life ==
Rainey was born in Clarksville, Texas. Although raised by a poor farming family, he graduated as valedictorian of Lovelady High School in 1913. He previously attended high school at Ferris and grade school in Eliasville. He was ordained as a Baptist minister at 19, and shortly thereafter enlisted in the Army during World War I. After receiving his bachelor's degree at Austin College, he pitched for various teams in the Texas League.

== Early academic career ==
Rainey began his career in higher education by teaching education at Austin College for three years before receiving his masters and doctorate at the University of Chicago. After receiving his doctorate, he taught for three years at the University of Oregon, then became the president of Franklin College in Indiana from 1927-1931 before becoming the director of the American Youth Commission of the American Council on Education. From 1931 to 1935, he was the president of Bucknell University. Subsequently, he served as director of the American Youth Commission of the American Council on Education for four years.

== Presidency and controversy at University of Texas ==
In 1939, Rainey was named President of University of Texas at Austin, at the time the largest university not only in Texas but also in the entire southern half of the United States. The makeup of the Board of Regents, however, soon changed due to appointments over the next several years by governors W. Lee O'Daniel and Coke R. Stevenson. Clashes started in 1941, when several members of the board pressured Rainey to fire four full professors of economics who espoused New Deal views. In 1942 the regents fired three untenured economics instructors and a fourth who had only a one-year appointment for having attempted to defend federal labor laws at an antiunion meeting in Dallas. Rainey protested their dismissals, and he also protested the fact that tenure was weakened and funding for social science was cut completely. The most spectacular single issue dividing Rainey from the regents was the board's repression of John Dos Passos's U.S.A. trilogy and its efforts to fire the professor who placed the third volume of the trilogy, The Big Money (1936), on the English department's sophomore reading list. The regents deemed the work subversive and perverted. Since the selection had been a committee decision no one was fired, but Rainey was outraged at what he believed to be a witch-hunt. All this, along with the fact that he tried to move the Medical Branch from Galveston to Austin a couple years earlier, caused the board to fire him on November 1, 1944, without citing any reason.

After the firing, 8,000 students went on strike and protested at the university and at the state capitol. Less than three months after Rainey's firing, the governor appointed new board members. While the new members increased funding for social science and rehired the aforementioned fired professors, they did not re-hire Rainey to his prior position as a professor of education. Several organizations, including the American Association of University Professors, the Southern Association of Colleges and Secondary Schools, and Phi Beta Kappa, reprimanded the university for firing Rainey. The censure by the American Association of University Professors lasted nine years, until the organization was convinced that the regents changed their policies.

== Later career ==
In 1946, he ran for the Democratic Primary for Governor of Texas, but lost in the primary to Beauford H. Jester, who eventually was elected governor.

After his defeat, he left Texas entirely and became president of Stephens College in Missouri, then a professor at the University of Colorado Boulder.

== Later life and death ==
After his retirement, he stayed in Boulder, where he died in 1985.

== Legacy ==
Despite the controversy and eventual firing, he is a symbol for academic freedom, even to this day, according to the University of Texas' website. He also is believed to be the 1st candidate for a statewide office in Texas supported by labor unions and minorities. Rainey had received numerous honors and awards, including the Robert L. Stearns Award and the outstanding professor award from the University of Colorado, as well as receiving an honorary doctorate, the founders medal, the distinguished alumnus award from Austin College. He also was elected to their athletic hall of fame and an award was named after him. In 1995 the University of Texas renamed its Music Building "Homer Rainey Hall" in his honor.

== See also ==
- Minnie Fisher Cunningham
