= Paul Wakefield (general) =

Paul Louis Wakefield
- Born: May 6, 1895; Lovelady, Texas, US
- Died: March 23, 1961 (aged 65); Austin, Texas, US
- Resting place: Austin Memorial Park
- Education: University of Texas at Austin
- Title: Major General

Major General Paul Louis Wakefield was a journalist, politician, and soldier.

== Early life ==
Wakefield was born, raised, and attended school in Lovelady, Texas. After graduation, he attended the University of Texas at Austin, where he majored in journalism.

== Military career ==
He served in the United States Army during World War I. Later, he was appointed 1st Lieutenant in the Texas National Guard, where he eventually became a Major General. In 1949, he was the director of the Selective Service in the state of Texas in 1949 before retiring in 1955.

== Journalism career ==
As soon as WWI was over, he worked as a newspaper reporter for the Houston Chronicle and later, the Texas reporter for the New York Herald Tribune. He also worked for the New York World.

== Political career ==
Wakefield served as aides to 2 Texas Governors, a Vice President, and assistant to Jesse H. Jones. He also worked served as a member of the planning board for the Public Works Administration.

== Personal life and death ==
Wakefield was married twice, the first ending in divorce. He had one son. He died in Austin in 1961.
