= 1944 Texas gubernatorial election =

- November 7, 1944
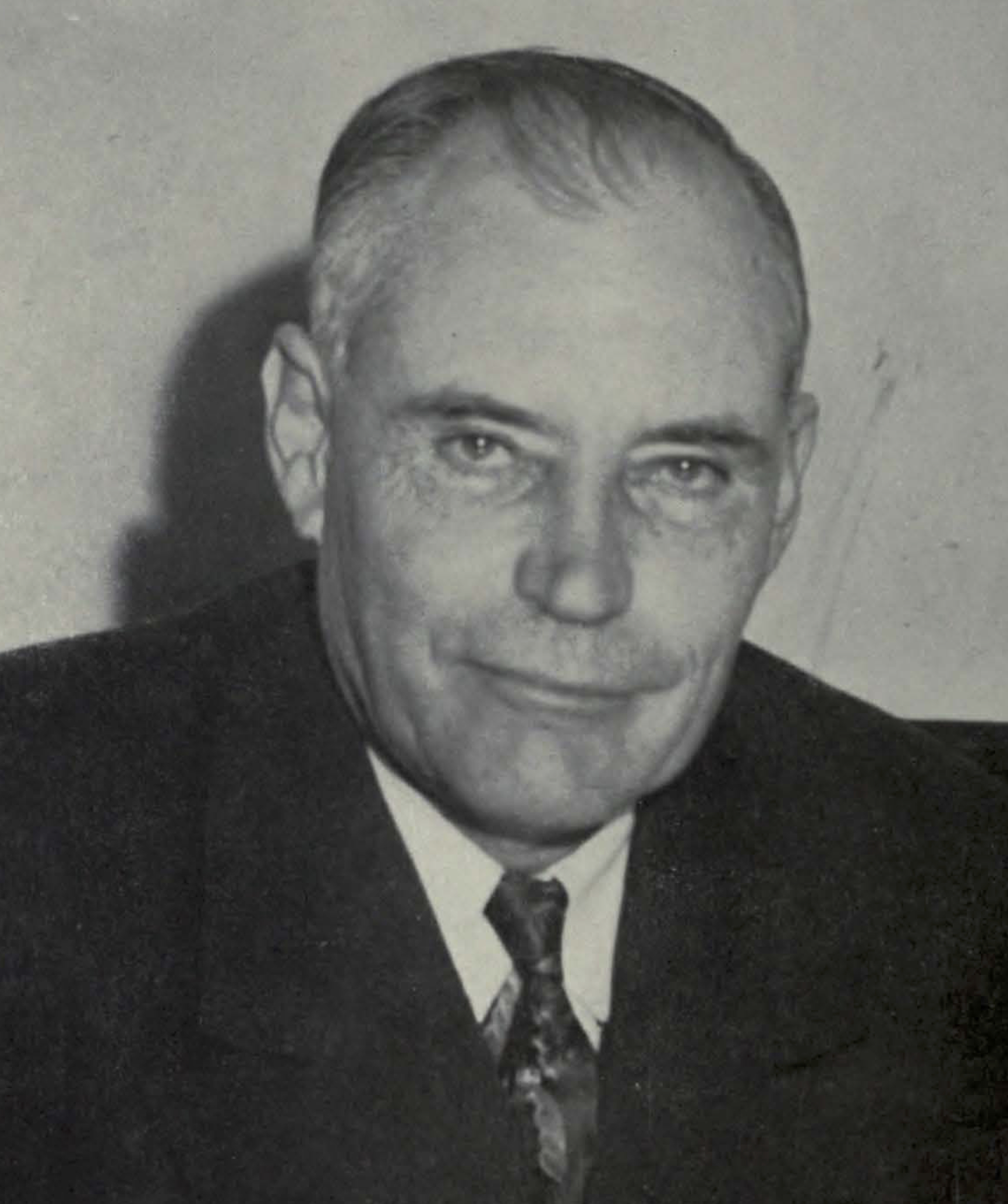

Nominee	Coke R. Stevenson	B. J. Peasley
Party	Democratic	Republican
Popular vote	1,007,826	100,287
Percentage	90.95%	9.05%
- County results Stevenson: 60–70% 70–80% 80–90% >90%
Governor before election
Coke R. Stevenson
Democratic
Elected Governor
Coke R. Stevenson
Democratic

The 1944 Texas gubernatorial election was held on November 7, 1944.

Incumbent Democratic Governor Coke R. Stevenson defeated Republican nominee B. J. Peasley with 90.95% of the vote.

== Nominations ==
=== Democratic primary ===
The Democratic primary election was held on July 22, 1944. By winning over 50% of the vote, Stevenson avoided a run-off which would have been held on August 26, 1944.

==== Candidates ====
- Edward L. Carey, real estate agent
- Minnie Fisher Cunningham, farmer, political activist, unsuccessful candidate for Democratic nomination for U.S. Senator in 1928
- Alex M. Ferguson, businessman and unsuccessful candidate for Democratic nomination for governor in 1942
- William F. Grimes, attorney
- Martin Jones, farmer
- Herbert E. Mills, dentist
- W. J. Minton, newspaper editor
- Gene S. Porter, businessman and unsuccessful candidate for Democratic nomination for governor in 1942
- Coke R. Stevenson, incumbent Governor

==== Results ====
Democratic primary results
Party	Candidate	Votes	%
Democratic	Coke R. Stevenson (incumbent)	669,586	84.59
Democratic	Minnie Fisher Cunningham	48,039	5.83
Democratic	Martin Jones	21,379	2.60
Democratic	Gene S. Porter	15,243	1.85
Democratic	Alex M. Ferguson	12,649	1.54
Democratic	William F. Grimes	9,443	1.15
Democratic	W. J. Minton	8,537	1.04
Democratic	Herbert E. Mills	6,640	0.81
Democratic	Edward L. Carey	4,633	0.56
Total votes		823,460	100.00

=== Republican nomination ===
The Republicans nominated B. J. Peasley, railroadman, at their state convention at Dallas on August 8, 1944.

== General election ==
=== Candidates ===
- Coke R. Stevenson, Democratic
- B. J. Peasley, Republican

=== Results ===
1944 Texas gubernatorial election
Party	Candidate	Votes	%	±%
Democratic	Coke R. Stevenson (incumbent)	1,007,826	90.95%	▼5.88
Republican	B. J. Peasley	100,287	9.05%	▲5.88
Majority		907,539	81.90%	▼11.76
Total votes		1,108,113	100.00%	
Democratic hold				

== Bibliography ==
- Gubernatorial Elections, 1787-1997. Washington, D.C.: Congressional Quarterly Inc. 1998. ISBN 1-56802-396-0.
- Texas Almanac, 1954-1955. Dallas, Texas: A. H. Belo Corporation. 1953.
