= Allan Shivers =

American politician (1907–1985)

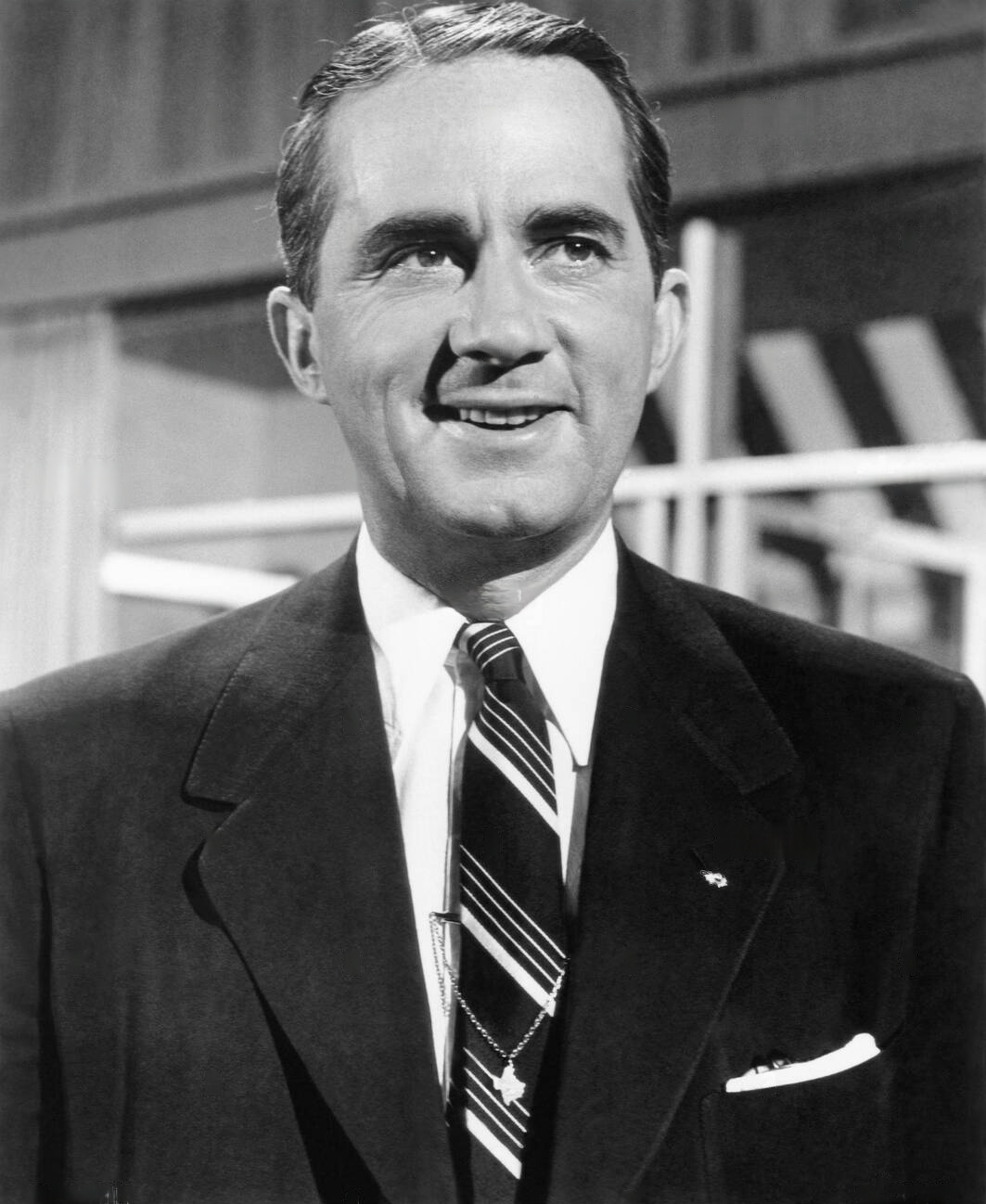
- Shivers in 1955

37th Governor of Texas
- In office July 11, 1949 – January 15, 1957
- Lieutenant: Vacant (1949–1951); Ben Ramsey (1951–1957)
- Preceded by: Beauford H. Jester
- Succeeded by: Price Daniel

Chair of the National Governors Association
- In office June 29, 1952 – August 2, 1953
- Preceded by: Val Peterson
- Succeeded by: Daniel I. J. Thornton

33rd Lieutenant Governor of Texas
- In office January 21, 1947 – July 11, 1949
- Governor: Beauford H. Jester
- Preceded by: John Lee Smith
- Succeeded by: Ben Ramsey

Member of the Texas Senate from the 4th district
- In office January 8, 1935 – January 14, 1947
- Preceded by: William R. Cousins Sr.
- Succeeded by: Wilfred R. Cousins Jr.

Personal details
- Born: Robert Allan Shivers; October 5, 1907 Lufkin, Texas, U.S.
- Died: January 14, 1985 (aged 77) Austin, Texas, U.S.
- Resting place: Texas State Cemetery
- Party: Democratic
- Spouse: Marialice Shary (m. 1937)
- Children: 4
- Education: University of Texas at Austin (LLB)

Military service
- Allegiance: United States
- Branch/service: United States Army
- Years of service: 1943–1945
- Rank: Major
- Battles/wars: World War II

Robert Allan Shivers (October 5, 1907 – January 14, 1985) was an American politician who served as the 37th governor of Texas from 1949 to 1957. Shivers was a leader of the Texas Democratic Party during the turbulent 1940s and 1950s and developed the lieutenant governor's post into an extremely powerful perch in the state government.

== Early life and career ==
Born in Lufkin, the seat of Angelina County in East Texas, Shivers was educated at the University of Texas at Austin and earned a law degree in 1933. There, he was a member of the Texas Cowboys and the Friar Society, and he served as the student body president.

In 1934, he was elected to the Texas State Senate, its youngest member ever. He served there from 1934 to 1946, except for two years' service in the US Army during World War II from which he was discharged with the rank of major.

== Lieutenant governor ==
In 1946, he was elected as the 33rd lieutenant governor of Texas by defeating the Republican nominee, John A. Donaldson, in a landslide, with Shivers garnering 344,630 votes (91.54%) to Donaldson's 31,835 votes (8.46%). Shivers was re-elected in 1948 by garnering 1,050,163 votes (87.47%) to the Republican Taylor Cole's 143,887 votes (11.98%).

He is credited with developing the "ideas, practices, and techniques of leadership" that made the office the most powerful post in Texas government although the governor's powers are limited by the state constitution more than in other states.

In office, Shivers initiated the practice of appointing state senators to specific committees and setting the daily agenda. Later, the Senate passed a right-to-work law, reorganized the public school system with the Gilmer-Akin laws, appropriated funds for higher education including the Texas State University for Negroes (now Texas Southern University), and provided money for improvements of state hospitals and highways.

== Governor ==
=== Electoral history ===
When Governor Beauford Jester died on July 11, 1949, Shivers succeeded him, the only lieutenant governor in Texas history who has gained the governor's office by the death of his predecessor. In 1950, Shivers won election as governor in his own right by defeating Republican Ralph W. Currie. There were 355,010 votes (89.93%) for the incumbent governor, and Currie garnered 39,737 votes (10.07%)

In 1952, Shivers proved so popular that he was listed on the gubernatorial ballot as the nominee of both the Democratic and Republican parties (Democrat Shivers handily defeated Republican Shivers). Between both parties, Shivers garnered 1,844,530 votes (98.05%) to "No Preference" getting 36,672 votes (1.95%). Texas law was later changed to remove the "No Preference" option.

Shivers then set the three-term precedent by running again and winning in 1954. He garnered 569,533 votes (89.42%) to the Republican Tod R. Adams's 66,154 votes (10.39%).

=== Governor of Texas ===
The Shivercrats were a conservative faction of the Democratic Party in Texas in the 1950s. The faction was named for Shivers, who was criticized by liberals in the party, particularly Ralph Yarborough, for his corruption and conservatism.

Shivers supported Republican presidential nominee Dwight Eisenhower instead of Democratic nominee Adlai Stevenson II in the 1952 election.

Corruption during the Shivers administration damaged his reputation and endangered his chances of re-election in 1954. Land Office Commissioner Bascom Giles was convicted of committing rampant fraud against Texas war veterans, with a disproportionate number of African-American veterans in particular, by a veterans land program under the Texas Veterans Land Board of the Texas General Land Office. Giles was the only member of the Shivers administration to go to prison, but Shivers and the state attorney general, John Ben Shepperd, as ex officio members of the Veterans Land Board, were implicated in the scandal, which occurred under their watch.

The Shivercrats responded with a vicious negative campaign that tried to paint the party liberals as communists. Shivers also urged the Texas Legislature to pass a bill making membership in the Communist Party a death-penalty offense and described such membership as being "worse than murder." However, a less extreme version of the proposition finally passed both Houses.

In 1956, Shivers ordered Captain Jay Banks of the Texas Ranger Division to block "desegregation of Mansfield High School in Tarrant County." The Mansfield school desegregation incident was the first state action resisting enforcement of the nationwide integration of public schools ordered by the US Supreme Court in Brown v. Board of Education (1954).

Lyndon Johnson at first aligned himself with the Shivercrats, including John Connally, but after becoming president, Johnson increasingly sided with Yarborough and the liberals on policy matters. Most of the Shivercrats either left public life or became Republicans after Johnson's presidency, as the liberal-moderate faction was in firm control of the state party after 1970.

=== Segregation and resistance to integration ===
Shivers was anti-integration and used the office of the governor to resist legally mandated integration in Texas. After the US Supreme Court decision ending the "separate but equal" doctrine in Brown v. Board of Education (1954), Shivers on July 27, 1955, appointed a committee, the Texas Advisory Committee on Segregation in Public Schools. The charge of this committee was to "[e]xamine three major problems and present recommendations leading to their solution. The problems are: (1) The prevention of forced integration. (2) The achievement of maximum decentralization of school authority. (3) The ways in which the State government may best assist the local school districts in solving their problems." The committee members were State Senator A.M. Aikin, Jr., Earnest E. Sanders, Mrs. Joe Fisher, J.V. Hammett, Charles Howell, Will Crews Morris, and Houston attorney Hall E. Timanus. A legal and legislative subcommittee of the Texas Advisory Committee on Segregation in Public Schools produced a 58-page report on August 18, 1955, detailing among other ideas ways that Texas schools could resist integration and the framework for ending compulsory public school attendance for those parents who did not want their children to attend integrated schools.

The recommendations of the committee were used as justification for Shivers' state actions in resisting integration, such as the Mansfield School Desegregation Incident.

== Later career ==
Shivers did not seek a fourth full term in the 1956 elections. He retired from politics on January 15, 1957, and went into business.

In 1973, Democratic governor Preston Smith appointed Shivers to the University of Texas Board of Regents. In January 1975, he was elected chairman of the board and served for four years. He donated his Austin home, Woodlawn, the historic Pease mansion, to the university to help raise funds for its law school.

In 1980, Shivers was instrumental in securing a $5 million grant for the UT Austin Moody College of Communication, which soon established an endowed chair of journalism in his honor.

Finally, he served as a member of the University of Texas Centennial Commission, which oversaw the 100th-anniversary celebration of the university's founding in 1883.

== Death ==
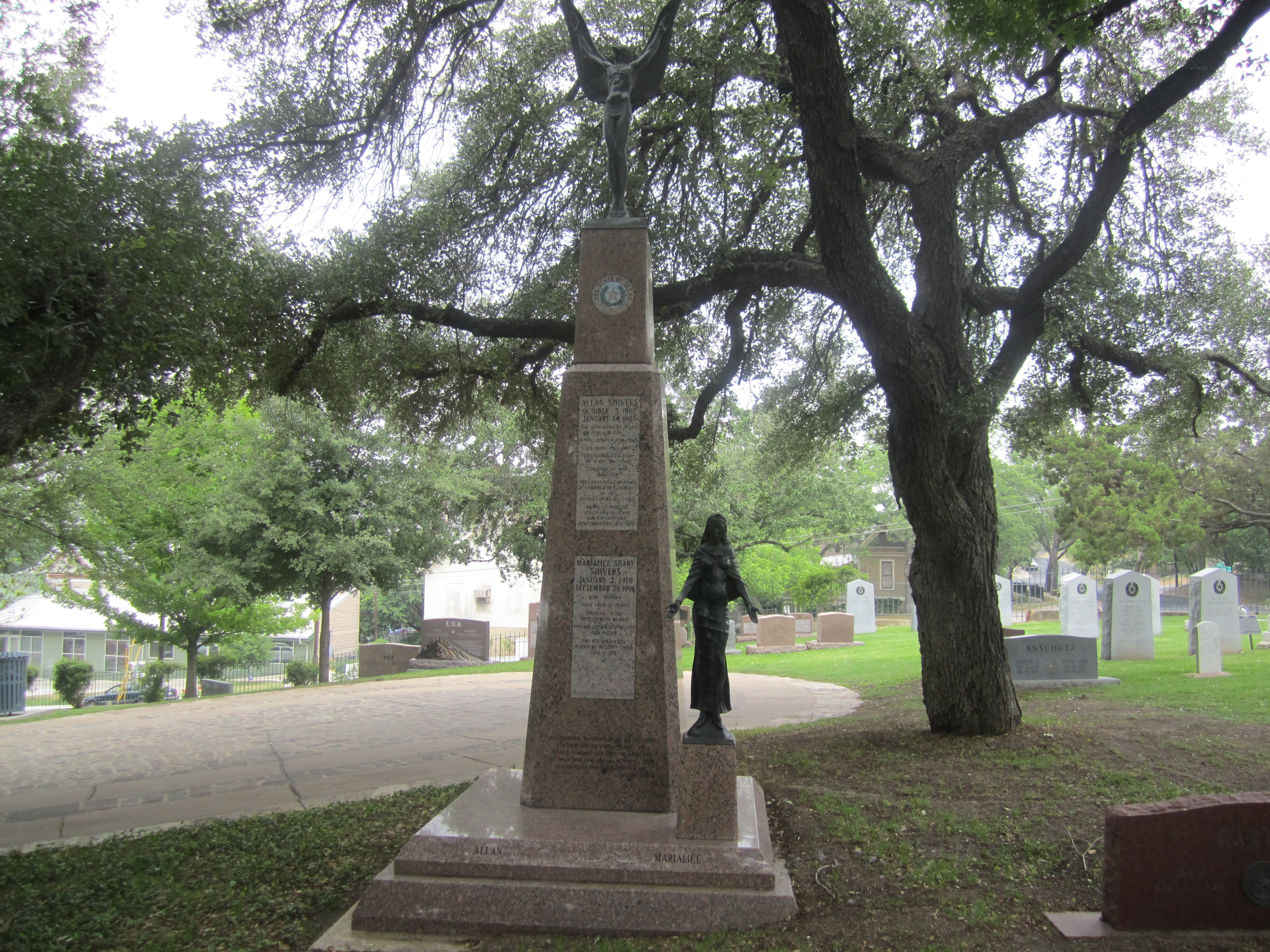
Allan Shivers monument at Texas State Cemetery in Austin

Shivers died suddenly of a heart attack in Austin on January 14, 1985.

== Electoral history ==
Gubernatorial election in Texas, 1950
Primary election
Party	Candidate	Votes	%
Democratic	Allan Shivers	829,730	76.36%
Democratic	Caso March	195,997	18.04%
Democratic	Charles B. Hutchison	16,048	1.48%
Democratic	Gene S. Porter	14,728	1.36%
Democratic	J. M. Wren	14,138	1.30%
Democratic	Benita Louise Marek Lawrence	9,542	0.88%
Democratic	Wellington Abbey	6,381	0.59%
Total votes		1,086,564	100.00%
General election
Democratic	Allan Shivers	355,010	89.93%
Republican	Ralph W. Currie	39,737	10.07%
Total votes		394,747	100.00%

Gubernatorial election in Texas, 1952
Primary election
Party	Candidate	Votes	%
Democratic	Allan Shivers (incumbent)	833,861	61.48%
Democratic	Ralph Yarborough	488,345	36.00%
Democratic	Allene M. Traylor	34,186	2.52%
Total votes		1,356,392	100.00%
General election
Democratic	Allan Shivers (incumbent)	1,375,547	73.12%
Republican	Allan Shivers (incumbent)	468,319	24.89%
No party	Allan Shivers (incumbent)	664	0.04%
Total	Allan Shivers (incumbent)	1,844,530	98.05%
Write-in		36,672	1.95%
Total votes		1,881,202	100.00%

Gubernatorial Democratic primary in Texas, 1954
Party	Candidate	Votes	%
Democratic	Allan Shivers (incumbent)	668,913	49.52%
Democratic	Ralph Yarborough	645,994	47.83%
Democratic	J. J. Holmes	19,591	1.45%
Democratic	Arlon B. Davis	16,254	1.20%
Total votes		1,350,752	100.00%

Gubernatorial Democratic primary runoff in Texas, 1954
Party	Candidate	Votes	%
Democratic	Allan Shivers (incumbent)	775,088	53.15%
Democratic	Ralph Yarborough	683,132	46.85%
Total votes		1,458,220	100.00%

Gubernatorial general election in Texas, 1954
Party	Candidate	Votes	%
Democratic	Allan Shivers (incumbent)	569,533	89.42%
Republican	Tod R. Adams	66,154	10.39%
Write-in		1,205	0.19%
Total votes		636,892	100.00%

== See also ==
- Mansfield School Desegregation Incident
- Allan Shivers Library and Museum
- Allan Shivers' altercation with author John Patric in college

== Works cited ==
- Black, Earl; Black, Merle (1992). The Vital South: How Presidents Are Elected. Harvard University Press. ISBN 0674941306.

== Bibliography ==
- J. William Davis, There Shall Also Be a Lieutenant Governor (1967).
- Tex. Legis. Council, Presiding Officers of the Texas Legislature: 1846–1995 81 (1995).
- National Governors Association, "Texas Governor Allan Shivers".

Texas Senate
Preceded by William R. Cousins Sr.	Member of the Texas Senate from the 4th district 1935–1947	Succeeded by Wilfred R. Cousins Jr.
Political offices
Preceded by John Lee Smith	Lieutenant Governor of Texas; 1947–1949	Succeeded by Ben Ramsey
Preceded by Beauford H. Jester	Governor of Texas; 1949–1957	Succeeded by Price Daniel
Preceded by Val Peterson	Chair of the National Governors Association; 1952–1953	Succeeded by Daniel I. J. Thornton
Party political offices
Preceded by John Lee Smith	Democratic nominee for Lieutenant Governor of Texas; 1946, 1948	Succeeded by Ben Ramsey
Preceded by Beauford H. Jester	Democratic nominee for Governor of Texas; 1950, 1952, 1954	Succeeded by Price Daniel
Preceded by Ralph W. Currie	Republican nominee for Governor of Texas; 1952	Succeeded by Tod R. Adams
