= 1942 Texas gubernatorial election =

- November 3, 1942
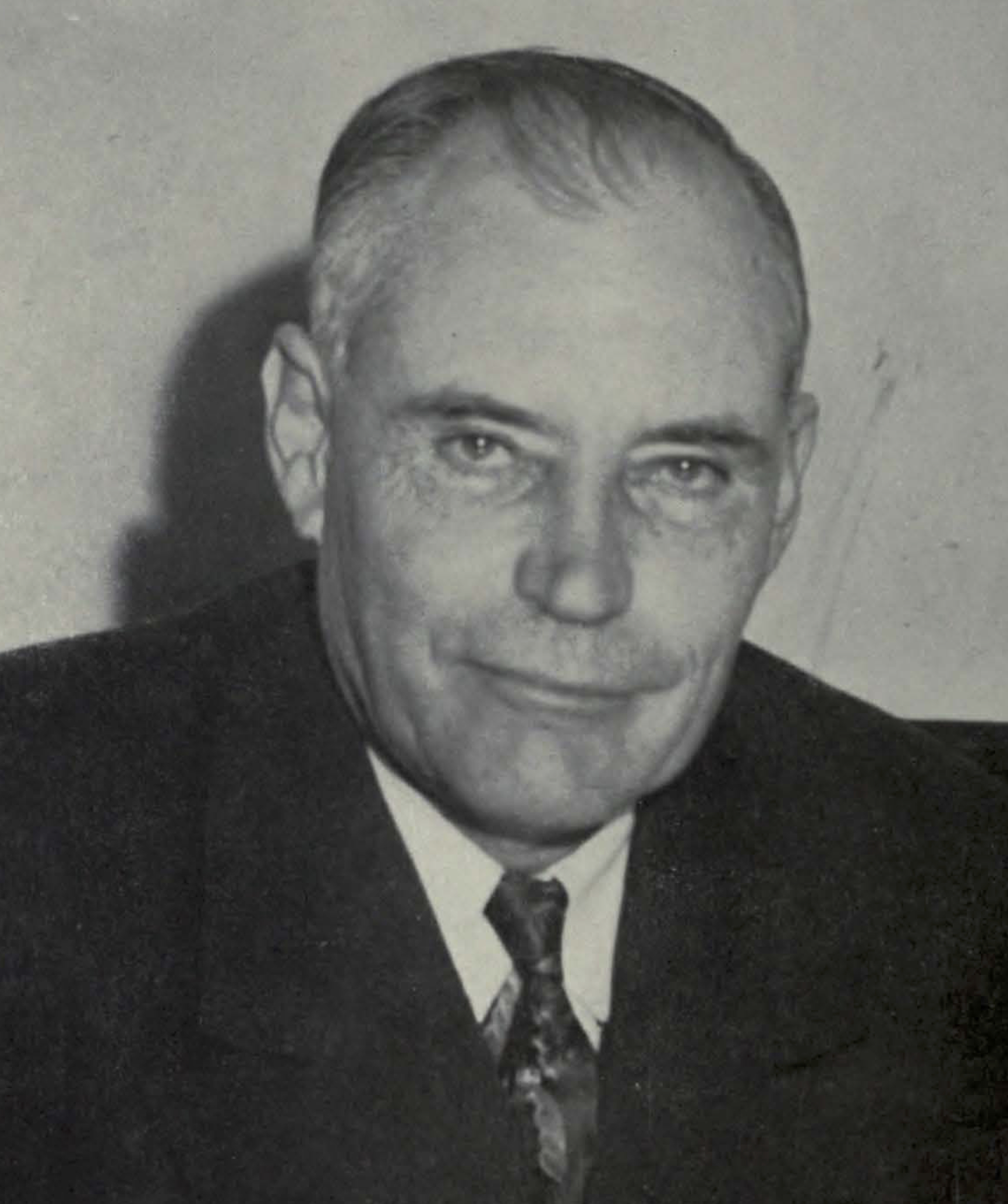
Nominee	Coke R. Stevenson	Caswell K. McDowell
Party	Democratic	Republican
Popular vote	280,735	9,204
Percentage	96.83%	3.17%
- County results Stevenson: 50–60% 60–70% 80–90% >90%
Governor before election
Coke R. Stevenson
Democratic
Elected Governor
Coke R. Stevenson
Democratic

The 1942 Texas gubernatorial election was held on November 3, 1942 between Coke R. Stevenson and Caswell K. McDowell.

Incumbent Democratic Governor Coke R. Stevenson defeated Republican nominee Caswell K. McDowell with 96.83% of the vote.

== Nominations ==
=== Democratic primary ===
The Democratic primary election was held on July 25, 1942. By winning over 50% of the vote, Stevenson avoided a run-off which would have been held on August 22, 1942.

==== Candidates ====
- Hal H. Collins, businessman
- Alex M. Ferguson, seed breeder
- Gene S. Porter, insurance broker
- Charles L. Somerville, law school operator
- Hope Wheeler, newspaper editor
- Coke R. Stevenson, incumbent Governor

==== Results ====
Democratic primary results
Party	Candidate	Votes	%
Democratic	Coke R. Stevenson (incumbent)	651,218	68.46
Democratic	Hal H. Collins	272,469	28.64
Democratic	Hope Wheeler	9,373	0.99
Democratic	Alex M. Ferguson	8,370	0.88
Democratic	Gene S. Porter	4,933	0.52
Democratic	Charles L. Somerville	4,853	0.51
Total votes		951,216	100.00

=== Republican nomination ===
The Republican state convention was held at San Angelo on August 10 and 11, 1942. Caswell Kelliston "C.K." McDowell, a former county judge of Val Verde County and longtime Republican activist in the state was nominated for Governor.

== General election ==
=== Candidates ===
- Coke R. Stevenson, (Democratic), incumbent Governor of Texas
- Caswell Kelliston McDowell (Republican), former county judge of Val Verde County, Texas.

=== Results ===
1942 Texas gubernatorial election
Party	Candidate	Votes	%	±%
Democratic	Coke R. Stevenson (incumbent)	280,735	96.83%	▲2.41
Republican	Caswell K. McDowell	9,204	3.17%	▼2.38
Majority		271,531	93.66%	▲4.79
Total votes		289,939	100.00%	
Democratic hold				

== Bibliography ==
- Gubernatorial Elections, 1787-1997. Washington, D.C.: Congressional Quarterly Inc. 1998. ISBN 1-56802-396-0.
- Texas Almanac, 1954-1955. Dallas, Texas: A. H. Belo Corporation. 1953.
