= John Lee Smith =

American politician

John L. Smith

32nd Lieutenant Governor of Texas
- In office January 19, 1943 – January 21, 1947
- Governor: Coke R. Stevenson
- Preceded by: Coke R. Stevenson
- Succeeded by: Allan Shivers

Member of the Texas Senate from the 24th district
- In office January 14, 1941 – March 1, 1942
- Preceded by: Wilbourne B. Collie
- Succeeded by: Pat M. Bullock

Personal details
- Born: John Lee Smith; May 16, 1894 Chico, Texas, U.S.
- Died: September 26, 1963 (aged 69) Lubbock, Texas, U.S.
- Party: Democratic
- Spouse: Ruth Velma Elrod (m. 1919)
- Education: Stamford College; West Texas State Teachers College

Military service
- Allegiance: United States
- Branch/service: United States Army
- Battles/wars: World War I

John Lee Smith (May 16, 1894 – September 26, 1963) was the 32nd lieutenant governor of Texas from 1943 to 1947. A member of the Democratic Party, he represented the 24th district in the Texas Senate from 1941 to 1942 and was a vocal opponent of Texas labor unions during his tenure.

== Biography ==
Born May 16, 1894 at Chico, Texas, and raised in Throckmorton, Texas, Smith was educated at Stamford College and West Texas State Teachers College before teaching school. In 1918, he went to France as a member of American Expeditionary Forces; while overseas, he also studied at a French university. Upon his return, he studied law at Chautauqua, New York, and went back to Throckmorton to practice law.

In 1920, Smith was elected Throckmorton County Judge and was the youngest judge in Texas at the time. He served until 1926, and then spent five years as a lawyer with the state education department in Austin. Smith returned to the private practice of law in 1931.

Smith was elected to the Texas Senate in 1940, and ran for and won the lieutenant governorship in 1942. He was reelected in 1944. While in the Legislature, both as member and presiding officer of the Senate, Smith was a critic of the closed shop; he supported legislation that would prohibit a person from interfering with another person's right to engage in a lawful occupation. He also supported a provision that would make it a felony for any union laborer to commit an act of violence while on strike and the Manford Act of 1943, a union regulation bill.

In 1946, Smith sought the Democratic nomination for governor, but he finished fifth behind Beauford Jester, Homer Rainey, Grover Sellers, and Jerry Sadler. Returning to the private practice of law, he formed a partnership with his son in Lubbock, where he died on September 26, 1963.

In 1956, Smith, who had supported the Dixiecrats in 1948 strongly criticized the Brown v. Board ruling in 1954, supported the campaign of T. Coleman Andrews–Thomas H. Werdel, who ran as the nominees for the States' Rights Party.

Party political offices
Preceded by Coke R. Stevenson	Democratic nominee for Lieutenant Governor of Texas; 1942, 1944	Succeeded by Allan Shivers
Texas Senate
Preceded by Wilbourne B. Collie	Texas State Senator from District 24 (Throckmorton); 1941–1942	Succeeded by Pat M. Bullock
Political offices
Preceded by Coke R. Stevenson	Lieutenant Governor of Texas; 1943–1947	Succeeded by Allan Shivers
