= Coke R. Stevenson =

Governor of Texas from 1941 to 1947

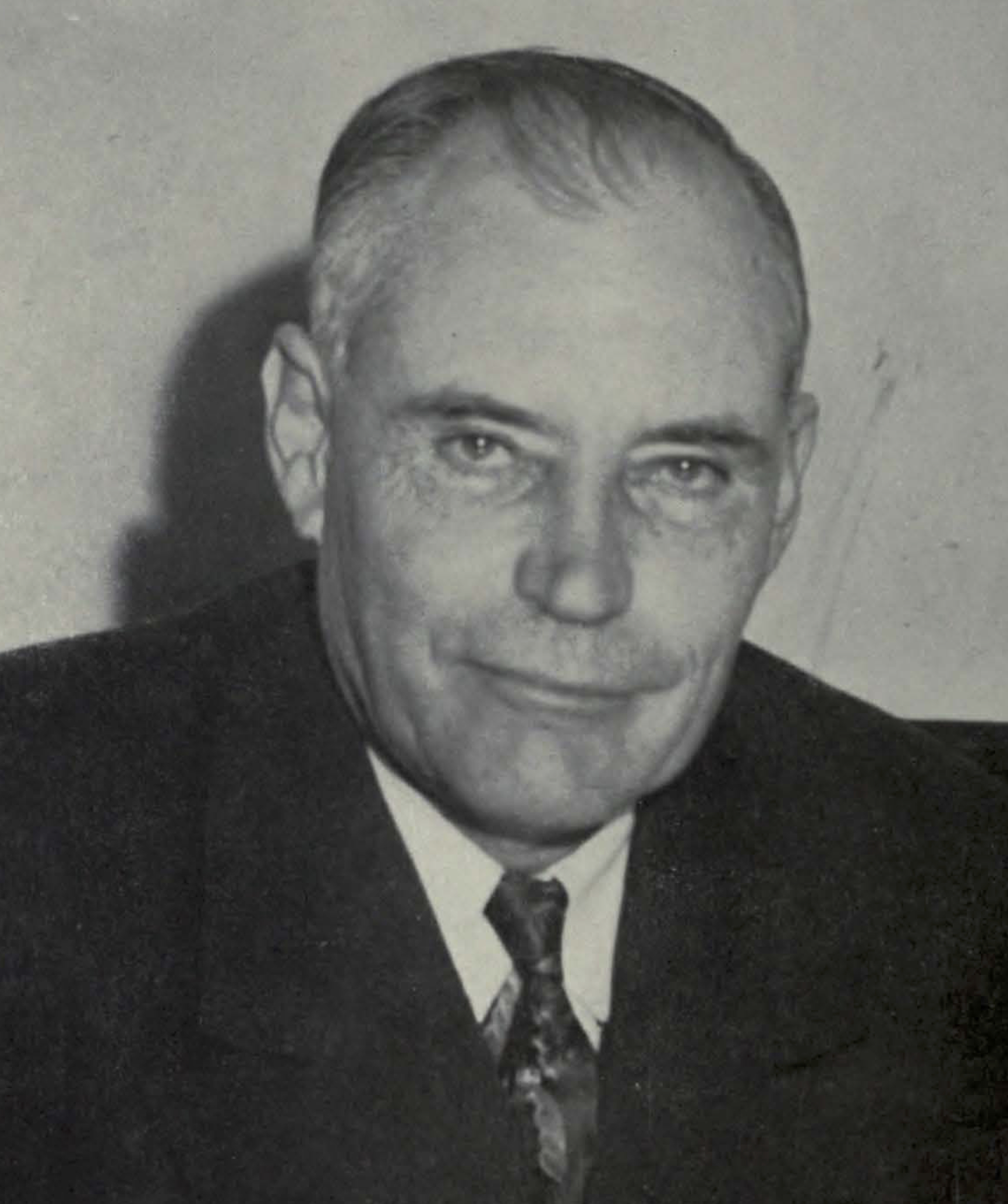
- Stevenson in 1946

35th Governor of Texas
- In office August 4, 1941 – January 21, 1947
- Lieutenant: Vacant (1941–1943); John Lee Smith (1943–1947)
- Preceded by: W. Lee O'Daniel
- Succeeded by: Beauford H. Jester

31st Lieutenant Governor of Texas
- In office January 17, 1939 – August 4, 1941
- Governor: W. Lee O'Daniel
- Preceded by: Walter Frank Woodul
- Succeeded by: John Lee Smith

Speaker of the Texas House of Representatives
- In office January 10, 1933 – January 12, 1937
- Preceded by: Fred Hawthorne Minor
- Succeeded by: Robert W. Calvert

Member of the Texas House of Representatives from the 86th district
- In office January 8, 1929 – January 10, 1939
- Preceded by: Roscoe Runge
- Succeeded by: Claude Henry Gilmer

Personal details
- Born: March 20, 1888 Mason County, Texas, U.S.
- Died: June 28, 1975 (aged 87) San Angelo, Texas, U.S.
- Resting place: Stevenson Family Ranch Cemetery, Telegraph, Texas, U.S.
- Party: Democratic (until c. 1949)
- Spouses: Fay Wright (m. 1912–1942) Marguerite King-Heap (m. 1954–1975)
- Children: 2
- Profession: Politician; rancher; lawyer

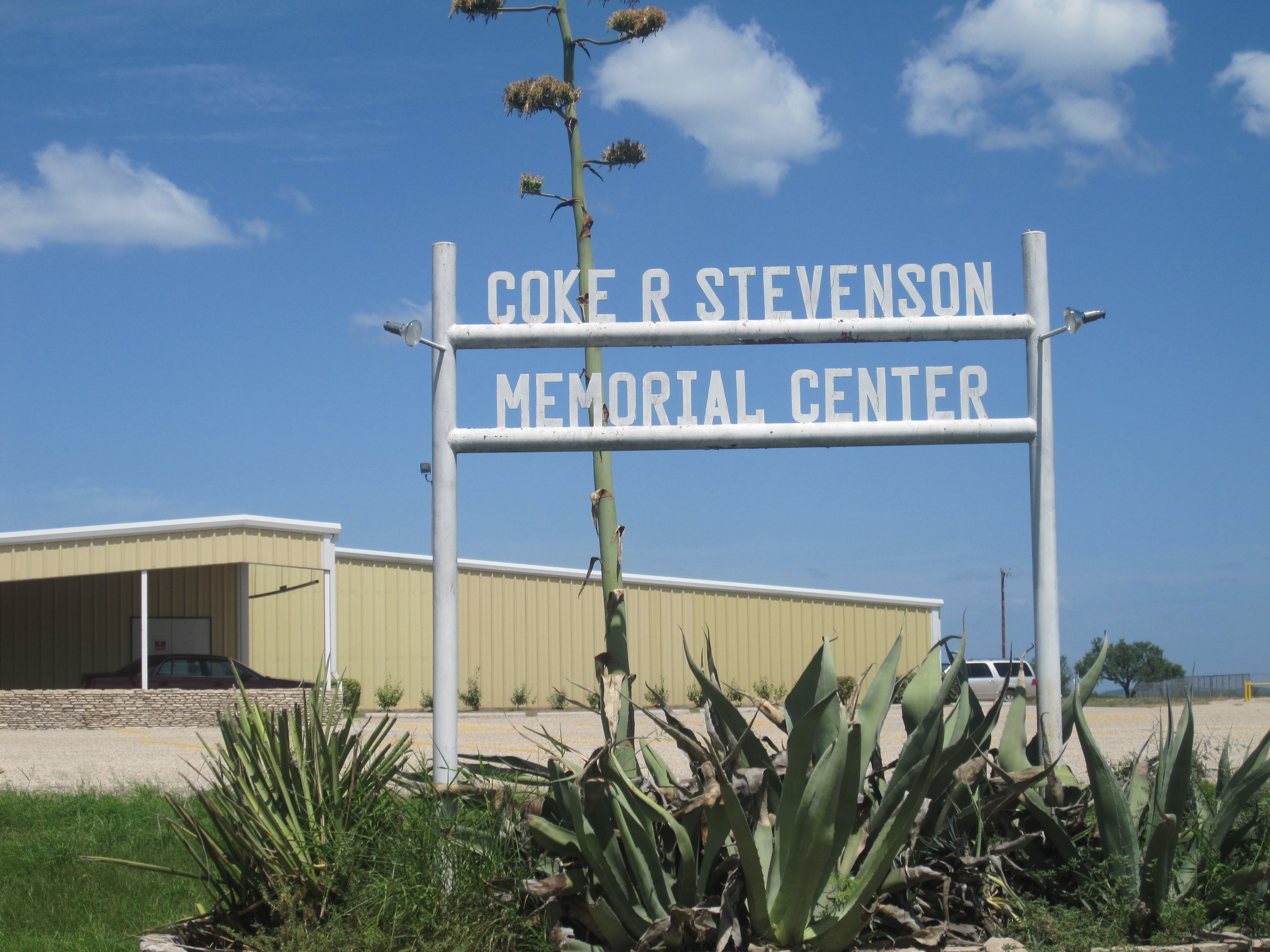
The Coke R. Stevenson Memorial Center meeting hall is located off Interstate 10 in Junction, Texas.

Coke Robert Stevenson (March 20, 1888 – June 28, 1975) was an American politician who served as the 35th governor of Texas from 1941 to 1947. He was the first Texan politician to hold the state's three highest offices (Speaker of the Texas House of Representatives, lieutenant governor, and governor). In 1966, Recorded Texas Historic Landmark marker number 5118, honoring Stevenson, was placed on the Kimble County Courthouse grounds in Junction, Texas.

== Early life ==
Stevenson was born in a log cabin in Mason County, the son of Robert Milton Stevenson and Virginia (Hurley) Stevenson. Although some works indicate that Stevenson was named after former Texas Governor Richard Coke, contemporary news accounts indicate he was named after Methodist Bishop Thomas Coke. Stevenson had three brothers – Bascom, Pierce, and Asbury – and their parents named each of the Stevenson sons after a prominent Methodist bishop. Stevenson's father was a surveyor and school teacher who later opened a store in Junction.

As a teenager, Stevenson went into business hauling freight with a six-horse wagon on a seventy-five mile trip between Junction and Brady, a trip that took a week to complete. On these trips he studied bookkeeping correspondence courses, history and government by the light of his nighttime campfires as part of a plan to begin a business or banking career. When Stevenson learned about the opening of the First State Bank in Junction, he applied for a bookkeeping job but was offered a position as a janitor. Hoping for an opportunity to prove himself and move up in the bank, Stevenson accepted and sold his freight and hauling business. Stevenson worked as the bank's janitor until he had the opportunity to fill in for the bookkeeper during an illness, and his capable performance resulted in promotion to the bookkeeper's position. Stevenson was promoted to cashier at age twenty; he was still a minor, so he had to be legally declared an adult in order to accept.

While cashier, Stevenson began courting Fay Wright, the youngest daughter of Junction's town physician. They were married on Christmas Eve, 1912. Because Stevenson could not afford to construct a home for the newlywed couple, he bought two abandoned houses and demolished them, using the materials from the houses to build a new one during evenings after his work at the bank. The Stevensons had their first child, son Coke Jr., in 1913 and on the same day purchased the first tract of what would become the Stevenson Ranch on the South Llano River.

Stevenson's interests were not limited to banking. He began studying law in his spare time as a cashier and at night in the office of attorney and judge Marvin Ellis Blackburn, with specific focus on the history of law. He attained admission to the bar in 1913 and began to practice in Junction.

== Early career ==
In 1913, Stevenson organized and became president of the First National Bank in Junction. As bank president, Stevenson developed a habit of sitting next to the front door of the bank so that he would be the first person his customers would see. He also became active in several other business ventures, including a warehouse, movie theater, hardware store, automobile dealership, newspaper, drug store, and hotel.

== Public service ==
=== Local government (1914–1920) ===
In 1914, the Kimble County commissioners' court appointed Stevenson to the office of County Attorney for the purpose of finding and prosecuting sheep and goat thieves who were tormenting county residents. Stevenson served as County Attorney for two terms, and during his tenure sheep and goat thefts in Kimble County declined sharply.

In 1918, a group of community leaders whose priority was the construction of adequate roads in Kimble County drafted Stevenson to run for Kimble County Judge, the chief executive position in Texas counties. Stevenson was reluctant to run, but eventually assented on the condition that the group would do all the campaigning for him and that he would not be asked to run for a second term. All but one candidate against Stevenson dropped out prior to election day and he was elected by a five to one margin, with the exact count being 757 to 155 votes. As County Judge one of Stevenson's most significant achievements was the completion of a road connecting Kimble County with Kerrville, and by extension, the railroad and San Antonio. Prior to the completion of this road there were no paved roads connecting Kimble County to the rest of the state. Stevenson retired from the county judgeship in December 1920 and returned to private life, with no intention of future public service.

=== Texas Legislature (1929–1939) ===
After a 1928 search to find a candidate for the state legislature in their district to advocate for ranchers' interests proved unsuccessful, Stevenson allowed supporters to offer his name in nomination. He was elected to the Texas House of Representatives as a conservative Democrat, and served there from 1929 until 1939. As a freshman lawmaker Stevenson introduced a successful bill establishing the Texas State Auditor's Office to keep track of expenditures, marking the beginning of a long state political career focused on economy in government spending. In Stevenson's second term he led a successful fight against governor Ross S. Sterling's proposal to issue $100,000,000 in bonds to complete the state highway system. In 1933, he was elected Speaker of the House; he was re-elected in 1935, becoming the first person in Texas history to serve two consecutive terms as Speaker.

After five terms in the House, in 1938 Stevenson ran for lieutenant governor. In his race for the Democratic nomination, the decisive race in the Democratic-controlled state, Stevenson offered no formal platform and eschewed the political fanfare that other candidates embraced. For this reason many questioned his ability to win the election. Stevenson placed second of six candidates, forcing a runoff with Pierce Brooks of Dallas. Stevenson continued his original strategy, which he described as running on "principles not promises" and won with 446,441 votes to Brooks' 400,444. As Lieutenant Governor Stevenson served under Governor W. Lee "Pappy" O'Daniel.

=== Governor of Texas (1941–1947) ===
Stevenson succeeded to the governorship on August 4, 1941, when Governor O'Daniel resigned to take a seat in the U.S. Senate, which he won in a special election against U.S. Representative Lyndon B. Johnson of Austin. In dramatic contrast to the flamboyant and unpredictable O'Daniel, Stevenson's approach was so conservative and taciturn that his critics accused him of doing nothing.

In 1942, Stevenson ran for a full term as governor. He faced only one serious challenger in the Democratic primary, Hal H. Collins. Although Collins was tacitly endorsed by the extremely popular former governor O'Daniel, Stevenson won the primary with 68% of the vote. In the 1944 election, Stevenson won the Democratic primary with over 84% of the vote, and won the general election against the Republican candidate with 90% of the vote. In both the 1942 and 1944 gubernatorial elections Stevenson won a higher percentage in the Democratic primaries than any other candidate in Texan history. Although Stevenson was urged to run for a third term, he declined, citing the tradition of previous governors to limit their tenure to two terms.

When Stevenson left the governorship in January 1947, he was the longest-serving governor in the history of Texas and had presided over a broad and deep economic recovery during the years of World War II. His tenure was primarily marked by his return of fiscal solvency to the Texas state government. In 1941, Stevenson inherited a General Fund deficit of over $30 million. By the time he left office in 1947 Stevenson had not only eliminated this debt, but had built a cash balance in the General Fund of over $35 million.

=== 1948 Senate election ===
In 1948, Stevenson was a candidate for the U.S. Senate in the regular election. He led the Democratic primary with 39.7% to 33.7% for Lyndon B. Johnson. A third candidate was George Peddy of Houston, originally from Shelby County in East Texas, who had been a write-in candidate for the Senate in 1922 but was defeated by Democratic nominee Earle Bradford Mayfield. With the top two finishers advancing to a runoff election, Peddy and several minor candidates were eliminated from contention.

In the hotly contested runoff between Stevenson and Johnson, Johnson won by only 87 votes out of 988,295 cast – one of the closest results in a senatorial election in U.S. history. (As there was only a weak Republican Party in Texas at the time, winning the Democratic primary was tantamount to election.)

Stevenson challenged the result on the grounds of ballot stuffing alleged to have occurred in a single precinct, which involved 202 disputed votes from Jim Wells County (200 for Johnson, 2 for Stevenson). The Democratic State Central Committee sustained Johnson's apparent victory by a 29–28 vote. Stevenson was granted an injunction by the federal district court, which barred Johnson from the general election ballot. However, Supreme Court Associate Justice Hugo Black, sitting as a circuit justice, ruled that the federal district court lacked jurisdiction, and that the question was for the Central Committee to decide. He ordered the injunction stayed, and his ruling was upheld by the full Supreme Court.

=== Retirement from politics ===
After the loss to Johnson, Stevenson retired to Junction. Disenchanted with the Democratic Party, he supported Republican Jack Porter against Johnson in the general election and continued to support Republicans for the rest of his life, including John G. Tower for the Senate and Richard Nixon and Barry Goldwater for the presidency.

== Personal life and death ==
On December 24, 1912, Stevenson married Fay Wright. The couple had one son, Coke Stevenson Jr. who was born in 1913. She died on January 3, 1942, shortly after he became governor.

On January 16, 1954, Stevenson married Marguerite King Heap. Marguerite had been married to Gordon Marshall Heap, who died in action during World War II. Gordon and Marguerite Heap were the parents of a son, Dennis. Marguerite and Stevenson were the parents of a daughter, Jane Stevenson Murr Chandler. Marguerite died March 24, 2010, in Ozona, Texas. Murr Chandler's son, Andrew Murr, later served in the Texas House.

Stevenson died on June 28, 1975, at Shannon Memorial Hospital in San Angelo, Texas. He was buried at the Stevenson Family Ranch in Telegraph.

== Historiography ==
Stevenson's character became a subject of historical discussion after the publication of Means of Ascent, the second volume of Robert Caro's biography of Lyndon Johnson, which covers the disputed 1948 election. Caro portrayed Stevenson as an honorable statesman and reluctant office-seeker, in contrast to the venal and intensely ambitious Johnson.

According to Johnson biographer Robert Dallek, "Coke Stevenson was a terribly reactionary man. First of all, on civil rights, in 1942, a black Texan was lynched in Texarkana and Stevenson gave very little public response against this. And when he was asked privately about it, his comment was, "'You know ... these Negroes sometimes do things which provoke whites to such violence.'"

In the April 26, 1990, issue of The New York Review of Books, Pulitzer Prize-winning author Garry Wills criticized Caro's characterization of the former Texas governor as anti-corrupt and claimed that in his gubernatorial campaigns, Stevenson had also likely forged a significant number of votes in the very same corrupt counties which aided Johnson in 1948. In one Texas gubernatorial primary, Stevenson obtained 3,310 votes in the notorious Duval County while five of his rivals split the remaining 17. In another example that shows how routine vote rigging was in South Texas, in the 1926 Texas gubernatorial election, incumbent Miriam A. "Ma" Ferguson won Duval County by 3,000 votes to five. By the time of the subsequent runoff, Ferguson had fallen out with Duval County boss Archie Parr, and Ferguson's opponent Dan Moody won Duval County by the same 3,000 to five margin.

Caro responded to these criticisms in The New York Times Book Review of February 2, 1991, asserting that rumors of vote stealing on Stevenson's part were believed primarily by younger members of Johnson's circle who had hardly served during Stevenson's tenure, and that "most of the politicians outside that circle who were old enough to be Stevenson's contemporaries said he had never stolen votes." This essay also appeared as an afterword to the paperback edition of Means of Ascent.

== See also ==
- Conservative Democrat
- Box 13 scandal

Party political offices
Preceded by Walter Frank Woodul	Democratic nominee for Lieutenant Governor of Texas; 1938, 1940	Succeeded by John Lee Smith
Preceded by W. Lee O'Daniel	Democratic nominee for Governor of Texas; 1942, 1944	Succeeded by Beauford H. Jester
Texas House of Representatives
Preceded by Roscoe Runge	Member of the Texas House of Representatives from District 86 (Junction); 1929–1939	Succeeded by Claud Henry Gilmer
Political offices
Preceded by Fred Hawthorne Minor	Speaker of the Texas House of Representatives; 1933–1937	Succeeded by Robert W. Calvert
Preceded by Walter Frank Woodul, Sr	Lieutenant Governor of Texas; January 17, 1939 – August 4, 1941	Succeeded by John Lee Smith
Preceded by W. Lee O'Daniel	Governor of Texas; August 4, 1941 – January 21, 1947	Succeeded by Beauford H. Jester
