= 23rd Texas Legislature =

Term of state legislature in Texas, US

←	22nd	24th	→
- The Seal of Texas

Overview
- Legislative body: Texas State Legislature
- Jurisdiction: Texas
- Term: January 10, 1893 – May 9, 1893
- Election: 1892 general election

Senate
- Members: 30
- President of the Senate: Martin McNulty Crane

House of Representatives
- Members: 128
- Speaker: John Hughes Cochran

Sessions
- 1st: January 10, 1893 – May 9, 1893

The 23rd Texas Legislature met from January 10 to May 9, 1893, in regular session. All members of the House of Representatives and a portion of the members of the Senate were elected in the 1892 general election.

== Sessions ==
- 23rd Regular session: January 10, 1893 – May 9, 1893

== Party summary ==
=== House of Representatives ===
Affiliation	Members	Note
Democratic Party	99	
Republican Party	1	
Populist	8	
Total	108	

== Officers ==
=== State ===
- Governor: James Stephen Hogg

=== Senate ===
- Lieutenant Governor: Martin McNulty Crane

=== House of Representatives ===
- Speaker of the House: John Hughes Cochran

== Members ==
=== Senate ===
Members of the Texas Senate for the twenty-third Texas Legislature:

- Edwin L. Agnew, Democrat
- Edwin Augustus Atlee, Sr., Democrat
- Jacob Chesterfield Baldwin, Democrat
- Thomas Elijah Boren, Democrat
- Oliver Perry Bowser, Democrat
- Woodson Heard Browning, Democrat
- John Walter Cranford, Democrat
- Miles G. Crowley, Democrat
- John McCulloch Dean, Democrat
- James Willis Dickson, Democrat
- Astyanax M. Douglass, Democrat
- Demosthenes Franklin Goss, Democrat
- Robert Autry Greer, Democrat
- William Oscar Hutchison, Populist
- Wiley Mangum Imboden, Democrat
- George Taylor Jester, Democrat
- John Gallatin Kearby, Democrat
- Leonidas Socrates Lawhon, Democrat
- Perry Joshua Lewis, Democrat
- William Perry McComb, Democrat
- James Madison McKinney, Democrat
- James Milton Presler, Democrat
- James Henry Shelburne, Democrat
- Friench Simpson, Democrat
- Emory C. Smith, Democrat
- Robert E. Steele, Democrat
- James W. Swayne, Democrat
- Walter E. Tips, Democrat
- Benjamin Franklin Whitaker, Democrat
- James Dinwiddie Woods, Democrat
- Charles Henderson Yoakum, Democrat

=== House of Representatives ===
Members of the Texas House of Representatives for the twenty-third Texas Legislature.

Some districts are multimember or floterial districts.

District	Representative	City	County	Party	Took office
1	Frank Mitchell Ball	Texarkana	Bowie	Democrat	1893
2	Daniel Denson Dodd	Linden	Cass	Democrat	1893
3	Thomas David Rowell, Sr.	Jefferson	Marion	Democrat	1893
4	Alvin Bosley Baker	Clarksville	Red River	Democrat	1893
5	Peter Hammonds Rogers	Mount Pleasant	Titus	Democrat	1893
6	Enoch Walter Fagan	Paris	Lamar	Democrat	1893
6	Travis Clack Henderson	Paris	Lamar	Democrat	1893 (prior: 1883–1887)
7	William Jordan Hood	Savoy	Fannin	Democrat	1889
7	James Walter Sumner	Randolph	Fannin	Democrat	1893
8	John Harmon Dills	Sherman	Grayson	Democrat	1891
8	William McCarty Peck	Denison	Grayson	Democrat	1893
8	David Edward Simmons	Sherman	Grayson	Democrat	1893
9	Jesse Craft Murrell	Coesfield	Cooke	Democrat	1889
10	John Milton Chambers	Montague	Montague	Democrat	1893
11	Samuel Green Tankersley	Decatur	Wise	Democrat	1893
12	Robert Lee Ragsdale	Denton	Denton	Democrat	1893
13	George Bibb Pickett	Decatur	Wise	Democrat	1893 (prior: 1874–1881)
14	James Rowland Gough	McKinney	Collin	Democrat	1891
14	James Lafayette Greer	McKinney	Collin	Democrat	1893
15	James Stevens Sherrill	Greenville	Hunt	Democrat	1893
16	Marshall Hiram Gossett	Kaufman	Kaufman	Democrat	1891
17	Samuel S. Frazer	Lone Oak	Hunt	Democrat	1893
18	Charles Osborne James	Sulphur Springs	Hopkins	Democrat	1893
19	Thomas Wilson Templeton	Winnsboro	Franklin	Democrat	1891
20	Robert A. Cain	Alba	Wood	Populist	1893
21	Louis P. Wilson	Marshall	Harrison	Democrat	1883
22	Jonathan Davenport Rudd	Waskom	Harrison	Democrat	1891
23	John Frank Onion	Tyler	Smith	Democrat	1893
24	Edward Willis Smith	Noonday	Smith	Democrat	1893
25	Benjamin Franklin Phillips	West Mountain	Upshur	Democrat	1891
26	Gaines B. Turner	Henderson	Rusk	Democrat	1893
27	Jeremiah Heath Long	Carthage	Panola	Democrat	1893
28	Levi Lloyd	Jacksonville	Cherokee	Democrat	1891
29	Benjamin Franklin Rogers	Palestine	Anderson	Democrat	1891
30	Fielding Harvey Bayne	Crockett	Houston	Democrat	1893
31	William James Townsend, Sr.	Lufkin	Angelina	Democrat	1893
32	Benjamin A. Calhoun	Chireno	Nacogdoches	Populist	1893
33	James W. Truitt	Center	Shelby	Democrat	1891 (prior: 1881–1883)
34	Moses Lycurgus Broocks	San Augustine	San Augustine	Democrat	1893
35	James Columbus Feagin	Livingston	Polk	Democrat	1893
36	William Hal Aldridge	Rockland	Tyler	Democrat	1893
36	David Sudduth Lindsey	Warren	Tyler	Democrat	1893
37	James Alexander Breeding	Houston	Harris	Democrat	1893 (prior: 1889–1891)
37	John Kennedy	Houston	Harris	Democrat	1893
38	Joseph Green Davis	Gladstone	Walker	Democrat	1893
38	David Henry Hamilton	Centralia	Trinity	Democrat	1893
39	George Preston Finlay	Galveston	Galveston	Democrat	1893 (prior: 1861–1862, 1873–1874, 1879–1883)
39	Thomas Henry Nolan	Galveston	Galveston	Democrat	1893
40	Nathan H. Haller	Brazoria	Brazoria	Republican	1893
41	John Adriance Ballowe	Richmond	Fort Bend	Democrat	1893
42	Martin McHenry Kenney	Bellville	Austin	Democrat	1893
43	Daniel Washington Jackson	Weimar	Colorado	Democrat	1893
44	Joseph Marion Kirk	Schulenburg	Lavaca	Democrat	1891
45	Charles John Henry Meyer	Ellinger	Fayette	Democrat	1893
45	Joseph Peter	Dubina	Fayette	Democrat	1891
46	James Gray Barbee	Wharton	Wharton	Democrat	1893
47	Nathan E. Dever	Brenham	Washington	Democrat	1893
48	Andrew Chastain Murray	Caldwell	Burleson	Democrat	1893
49	George Turner Jackson	Unknown	Burleson	Democrat	1893
50	David A. McFall	Austin	Travis	Democrat	1893
50	Thomas Henry Wheless	Austin	Travis	Democrat	1893
51	Edgar Huntley Rogan	Lockhart	Caldwell	Democrat	1891
52	Thomas Jackson Floyd	Elgin	Bastrop	Populist	1893
53	James Andrew Graham	Burnet	Burnet	Democrat	1893
54	William E. Barry	Navasota	Grimes	Democrat	1893
55	Henry Kirk White	Bryan	Brazos	Democrat	1893 (prior: 1883–1885)
56	L. Travis Dashiell	Jewett	Leon	Democrat	1893
57	Lewis Napeleon Barbee	Wortham	Freestone	Populist	1893
58	Adolphus Samuel Henry	Blooming Grove	Navarro	Democrat	1893
59	Thomas Harrison Barron	Athens	Henderson	Democrat	1893
60	James Isom Moody	Mexia	Limestone	Democrat	1889
61	Jonathan Jackson Davis	Kosse	Falls	Democrat	1891 (prior: 1887–1889)
62	Thomas Stalworth Henderson	Cameron	Milam	Democrat	1893
63	Romanus Talbot	Calvert	Robertson	Democrat	1893
64	John Wesley Alston	Thornton	Limestone	Democrat	1893
65	Shelby N. Strange	Troy	Bell	Democrat	1891
65	Spencer Young	Killeen	Bell	Democrat	1893
66	Seth Phineas Mills	Waco	McLennan	Democrat	1893 (prior: 1879–1881, 1887–1891)
66	Robert Henry Rogers	Waco	McLennan	Democrat	1893
67	Elbert M. Weeks	Turnersville	Coryell	Democrat	1893
68	James Andrew Beall	Waxahachie	Ellis	Democrat	1892
69	James Donnegan Griffin	Alvarado	Johnson	Populist	1893
70	John Miles King	Ennis	Ellis	Democrat	1893
71	James Henry Faubion	Leander	Williamson	Democrat	1893, (prior: 1885–1891)
72	Montague James Moore	Cameron	Milam	Democrat	1893
73	John Hughes Cochran	Dallas	Dallas	Democrat	1891 (prior: 1874–1881, 1883–1885)
73	Patrick Henry Golden	Dallas	Dallas	Democrat	1893
73	A.S. Taylor	Lancaster	Dallas	Democrat	1893
74	Bunyan King	Rockwall	Rockwall	Democrat	1893
75	Thomas Slater Smith	Hillsboro	Hill	Democrat	1893
76	Oba R. Morrison	Hico	Hamilton	Democrat	1893
77	William Abner Fields	Hillsboro	Hill	Democrat	1893
78	Thomas Benton Maddox	Fort Worth	Tarrant	Democrat	1893
78	Elihu Newton	Bransford	Tarrant	Democrat	1893 (prior: 1887–1889)
79	Richard Bartow Hood	Weatherford	Parker	Democrat	1891
80	William Ballard Wohlford	Acton	Hood	Democrat	1893
81	Marion Lafayette Garrett	Palo Pinto	Palo Pinto	Democrat	1893
82	Michael Jefferson Baker	Cuero	DeWitt	Democrat	1891
83	Albert G. Kennedy	Beeville	Bee	Democrat	1893
84	James Rogers Cocke	Rancho	Gonzales	Populist	1893
85	Thomas W. Kennedy	Rio Grande City	Starr	Democrat	1893 (prior: 1885–1891)
85	William Jarvis Russell	Brownsville	Cameron	Democrat	1893
86	Albert Urbahn	Laredo	Webb	Democrat	1889
87	Atkins Jefferson McLemore	Corpus Christi	Nueces	Democrat	1893
88	Frank Russell Graves	Helena	Karnes	Democrat	1891
89	William Clark McElwee	St. Hedwig	Bexar	Democrat	1891
89	James Luther Slayden	San Antonio	Bexar	Democrat	1891
90	Thomas A. Rodriguez	Anchorage	Atascosa	Democrat	1893 (prior: 1882–1883)
91	Blucher Haynes Erskine	Derby	Frio	Democrat	1889
92	Friedrich Wilhelm Dorow	Pipe Creek	Bandera	Populist	1893
93	James Flack	Llano	Llano	Democrat	1893
94	Joseph Frazer Brown	Cherokee	San Saba	Democrat	1893 (prior: 1874–1876)
95	Thomas Carlos Wynn	San Angelo	Tom Green	Democrat	1893
96	Samuel McKay Simmons	Eagle Pass	Maverick	Democrat	1893
96	William Ward Turney	Alpine	Brewster	Democrat	1893
97	Ferdinand Carl Weinert	Seguin	Guadalupe	Democrat	1893
98	Clarence White Martin	Johnson City	Blanco	Democrat	1893
98	George Thomas McGehee	San Marcos	Hays	Democrat	1893 (prior: 1887–1891)
99	Joseph Newton Chandler	Bluff Dale	Erath	Democrat	1893
100	John Thomas Currey	Canton	Van Zandt	Democrat	1891 (prior: 1887–1889)
101	Alfred La Fayette Burleson	Comanche	Comanche	Populist	1893
102	Jeremiah Rowland Dean	La Plata	Deaf Smith	Democrat	1893
103	Samuel Houston Hodges	Wichita Falls	Wichita	Democrat	1893
104	William Petit Sebastian	Breckenridge	Stephens	Democrat	1893
105	James Kyle Wester	Jacksboro	Jack	Democrat	1893
106	Albert Scales Hawkins	Midland	Midland	Democrat	1893
107	James Franklin Cunningham	Anson	Jones	Democrat	1893
108	Malcolm Leander McFarland	Rockwood	Coleman	Democrat	1893
