= Texas's 42nd House of Representatives district =

American legislative district

Texas's 42nd State House of Representatives district
Representative
Richard Raymond; D–Laredo

District 42 is a district in the Texas House of Representatives. It has been represented by Democrat Richard Raymond since 2001.

== Geography ==
The district is located in Webb County, Texas.

== List of representatives ==
Leg.	Portrait	Representative	Party	Term start	Term end	Counties they represented
3rd		Reuben E. Clements	Unknown	November 5, 1849	November 3, 1851	Cameron, Nueces, Starr, Webb
4th		Andrew Jackson Hamilton	Democratic	November 3, 1851	November 7, 1853	Travis
5th		William Francis Daniel	Unknown	November 7, 1853	November 5, 1855	Falls, Freestone, Limestone
6th		Milton Busby	Unknown	November 5, 1855	November 2, 1857	Falls, Freestone, Limestone
7th		Thomas P. Aycock	Democratic	November 2, 1857	November 7, 1859	Falls, Freestone, Limestone
8th		Aaron Perry Jr.	Democratic	November 7, 1859	November 4, 1861	Falls, Freestone, Limestone
9th		Joseph Ward	Unknown	November 4, 1861	January 14, 1862	Ellis, Johnson, Parker
10th		Edmund Gaines Pendleton	Unknown	November 2, 1863	August 6, 1866	Ellis, Johnson, Parker
10th		John Henry Prince	Unknown	November 2, 1863	April 18, 1864	Ellis, Johnson, Parker
10th		Vacant	—N/a	April 18, 1864	May 4, 1864	Ellis, Johnson, Parker
10th		William Russell Shannon	Democratic	May 4, 1864	August 6, 1866	Ellis, Johnson, Parker
11th		Benjamin P. Hendley	Unknown	August 6, 1866	February 7, 1870	Ellis, Johnson, Parker
11th		C. L. Jordan	Unknown	August 8, 1866	February 7, 1870	Ellis, Johnson, Parker
12th		Vacant	—N/a	February 7, 1870	January 14, 1873	—N/a
13th		Vacant	—N/a	January 14, 1873	January 13, 1874	—N/a
14th		Vacant	—N/a	January 13, 1874	April 18, 1876	—N/a
15th		Elias Brooks Smyth	Democratic	April 18, 1876	January 14, 1879	Limestone
16th		James Petty Brown	Democratic	January 14, 1879	January 11, 1881	Limestone
17th		Lafayette Lumpkin Foster	Democratic	January 11, 1881	January 9, 1883	Limestone
18th		John Marks Moore	Democratic	January 9, 1883	January 13, 1885	Eastland, Palo Pinto, Stephens
19th		Joseph T. Webb	Democratic	January 13, 1885	January 11, 1887	Eastland, Palo Pinto, Stephens
20th		Alexander Hamilton Latimer	Prohibitionist Democrat	January 11, 1887	January 8, 1889	Eastland, Palo Pinto, Stephens
21st		Charles Ulrich Connellee	Democratic	January 8, 1889	January 10, 1891	Eastland, Palo Pinto, Stephens
22nd		Charles Ulrich Connellee	Democratic	January 10, 1891	January 10, 1893	Eastland, Palo Pinto, Stephens
23rd		Martin McHenry Kenney	Democratic	January 10, 1893	January 8, 1895	Austin
24th		Charles Langhammer	Democratic	January 8, 1895	January 12, 1897	Austin
25th		Frank Lotto	Democratic	January 12, 1897	January 10, 1899	Austin
26th		Dethloff Willrodt	Democratic	January 10, 1899	January 8, 1901	Austin
27th		Charles Cantrell Glenn	Democratic	January 8, 1901	January 13, 1903	Austin
28th		William Jackson Bryant	Democratic	January 13, 1903	January 10, 1905	Limestone
29th		William Jackson Bryant	Democratic	January 10, 1905	January 8, 1907	Limestone
30th		George A. Bell	Democratic	January 8, 1907	January 12, 1909	Limestone
31st		Lucius Pat Leach	Democratic	January 12, 1909	January 10, 1911	Limestone
32nd		Lucius Pat Leach	Democratic	January 10, 1911	January 14, 1913	Limestone
33rd		James Leonard Webb	Democratic	January 14, 1913	January 12, 1915	Grayson
33rd		Icil Burchett "Ice" Reeves	Democratic	January 14, 1913	January 12, 1915	Grayson
34th		Icil Burchett "Ice" Reeves	Democratic	January 12, 1915	January 9, 1917	Grayson
34th		Dan Scott McMillin	Democratic	January 12, 1915	January 9, 1917	Grayson
35th		Dan Scott McMillin	Democratic	January 9, 1917	January 14, 1919	Grayson
35th		Icil Burchett "Ice" Reeves	Democratic	January 9, 1917	January 14, 1919	Grayson
36th		Icil Burchett "Ice" Reeves	Democratic	January 14, 1919	January 11, 1921	Grayson
36th		Dan Scott McMillin	Democratic	January 14, 1919	January 11, 1921	Grayson
37th		Humboldt Cummins	Democratic	January 11, 1921	January 9, 1923	Grayson
37th		Joseph Robert Westbrook	Democratic	January 11, 1921	January 9, 1923	Grayson
38th		Clifford Eugene Dinkle	Democratic	January 9, 1923	January 13, 1925	Hunt, Rains
39th		Clifford Eugene Dinkle	Democratic	January 13, 1925	January 11, 1927	Hunt, Rains
40th		Selby Evans Barnett	Democratic	January 11, 1927	January 8, 1929	Hunt, Rains
41st		Selby Evans Barnett	Democratic	January 8, 1929	January 13, 1931	Hunt, Rains
42nd		Benjamin Franklin Vaughn	Democratic	January 13, 1931	January 10, 1933	Hunt, Rains
43rd		Benjamin Franklin Vaughn	Democratic	January 10, 1933	January 8, 1935	Hunt, Rains
44th		Jesse Elbert Roach	Democratic	January 8, 1935	January 12, 1937	Hunt, Rains
45th		Louis Mountville Lankford	Democratic	January 12, 1937	January 10, 1939	Hunt, Rains
46th		Robert Graham Piner	Democratic	January 10, 1939	January 13, 1941	Hunt, Rains
47th		William Leonard Carlton	Democratic	January 14, 1941	January 12, 1943	Hunt, Rains
48th		William Leonard Carlton	Democratic	January 12, 1943	January 9, 1945	Hunt, Rains
49th		Edward P. Mangum	Democratic	January 9, 1945	January 14, 1947	Hunt, Rains
50th		Joseph Ogden Berry	Democratic	January 14, 1947	January 11, 1949	Hunt, Rains
51st		William Agnew Swindell	Democratic	January 11, 1949	January 9, 1951	Hunt, Rains
52nd		William Agnew Swindell	Democratic	January 9, 1951	July 5, 1951 (resigned)	Hunt, Rains
52nd		Vacant	—N/a	July 5, 1951	November 13, 1951	Hunt, Rains
52nd		Robert Edgar Hutchins Jr.	Democratic	November 13, 1951	January 13, 1953	Hunt, Rains
53rd		Jimmy Ralph Morris	Democratic	January 13, 1953	July 15, 1954 (resigned)	Navarro
53rd		Vacant	—N/a	July 15, 1954	January 11, 1955	Navarro
54th		Robert Clifton Jackson	Democratic	January 11, 1955	January 8, 1957	Navarro
55th		Robert Clifton Jackson	Democratic	January 8, 1957	January 13, 1959	Navarro
56th		Robert Clifton Jackson	Democratic	January 13, 1959	January 10, 1961	Navarro
57th		Paul Williams Curington	Democratic	January 10, 1961	January 8, 1963	Navarro
58th		Ronald Edd Roberts	Democratic	January 8, 1963	January 12, 1965	Hill, Navarro
59th		Ronald Edd Roberts	Democratic	January 12, 1965	January 10, 1967	Hill, Navarro
60th		Joseph Terry Newman	Democratic	January 10, 1967	January 14, 1969	DeWitt, Goliad, Jackson, Lavaca, Refugio
61st		Joseph Terry Newman	Democratic	January 14, 1969	January 12, 1971	DeWitt, Goliad, Jackson, Lavaca
62nd		Tim Von Dohlen	Democratic	January 12, 1971	January 9, 1973	DeWitt, Goliad, Jackson, Lavaca
63rd		William G. "Bill" Coody	Democratic	January 9, 1973	January 14, 1975	Parker, Tarrant
64th		William G. "Bill" Coody	Democratic	January 14, 1975	January 11, 1977	Parker, Tarrant
65th		William G. "Bill" Coody	Democratic	January 11, 1977	January 9, 1979	Parker, Tarrant
66th		William G. "Bill" Coody	Democratic	January 9, 1979	January 13, 1981	Parker, Tarrant
67th		William G. "Bill" Coody	Democratic	January 13, 1981	January 11, 1983	Parker, Tarrant
68th		Antonio C. "Tony" Garcia	Democratic	January 11, 1983	January 8, 1985	Hidalgo
69th		Antonio C. "Tony" Garcia	Democratic	January 8, 1985	January 13, 1987	Hidalgo
70th		Renato Cuellar	Democratic	January 13, 1987	January 10, 1989	Hidalgo
71st		Renato Cuellar	Democratic	January 10, 1989	January 8, 1991	Hidalgo
72nd		Renato Cuellar	Democratic	January 8, 1991	January 12, 1993	Hidalgo
73rd		Henry Cuellar	Democratic	January 12, 1993	January 10, 1995	Webb
74th		Henry Cuellar	Democratic	January 10, 1995	January 14, 1997	Webb
75th		Henry Cuellar	Democratic	January 14, 1997	January 12, 1999	Webb
76th		Henry Cuellar	Democratic	January 12, 1999	January 2, 2001	Webb
77th		Richard Peña Raymond	Democratic	January 24, 2001	January 14, 2003	Webb
78th		Richard Peña Raymond	Democratic	January 14, 2003	January 11, 2005	Webb
79th		Richard Peña Raymond	Democratic	January 11, 2005	January 9, 2007	Webb
80th		Richard Peña Raymond	Democratic	January 9, 2007	January 13, 2009	Webb
81st		Richard Peña Raymond	Democratic	January 13, 2009	January 11, 2011	Webb
82nd		Richard Peña Raymond	Democratic	January 11, 2011	January 8, 2013	Webb
83rd		Richard Peña Raymond	Democratic	January 8, 2013	January 13, 2015	Webb
84th		Richard Peña Raymond	Democratic	January 13, 2015	January 10, 2017	Webb
85th		Richard Peña Raymond	Democratic	January 10, 2017	January 8, 2019	Webb
86th		Richard Peña Raymond	Democratic	January 8, 2019	January 12, 2012	Webb
87th		Richard Peña Raymond	Democratic	January 12, 2021	January 10, 2023	Webb
88th		Richard Peña Raymond	Democratic	January 10, 2023	January 14, 2025	Webb
89th		Richard Peña Raymond	Democratic	January 14, 2025	January 12, 2027	Webb
