= 18th Texas Legislature =

The 18th Texas Legislature met from January 9, 1883 to February 6, 1884 in its regular session and one called session. All members of the House of Representatives and about half of the members of the Senate were elected in the 1882 general election.

== Sessions ==
- 18th Regular session: January 9–April 13, 1883
- 18th First called session: January 8–February 6, 1884

== Officers ==
=== Senate ===
Lieutenant Governor
Francis Marion Martin, Democrat
President pro tempore
Augustus W. Houston, Democrat, Regular session
Samuel Bronson Cooper, Democrat, ad interim, First called session

=== House of Representatives ===
Speaker of the House
Charles Reese Gibson, Democrat

== Members ==
Members of the Eighteenth Texas Legislature as of the beginning of the Regular Session, January 9, 1883:

=== Senate ===
District	Senator	Party	Took office
1	Samuel Bronson Cooper	Democrat	1881
2	Frank L. Johnson		1883
3	William Henry Pope	Democrat	1883
4	John A. Peacock		1883
5	E. A. King		1883
6	John C. Buchanan		1879
7	John Young Gooch		1879
8	Mansel Y. Randolph		1883
9	James W. Jones		1883
10	Asa E. Stratton, Jr.		1883
11	Samuel C. Patton		1879
12	Alvah Chesley		1883
13	John P. Fowler		1883
14	James S. Perry		1883
15	Lochlin Johnson Farrar		1883
16	Barnett Gibbs	Democrat	1883
17	John Johnson		1883
18	William O. Davis		1882
19	Avery L. Matlock		1883
20	William R. Shannon	Democrat	1879 (Prior: 1865–1867)
21	William H. Getzendaner		1883
22	John A. Martin		1883
23	Andrew Jackson Harris		1881
24	Alexander Watkins Terrell	Democrat	1876
25	George Pfeuffer		1883
26	Rudolph Kleberg		1883
27	Norman G. Collins		1883
28	Augustus W. Houston	Democrat	1879
29	James Richard Fleming	Democrat	1883
30	John Henry Traylor		1883
31	William A. Evans		1883

=== House of Representatives ===
- Benjamin M. Baker
- William John Caven
- R. J. Evans
- George Finlay
- George Washington Lafayette Fly
- Lafayette Lumpkin Foster
- Charles Reese Gibson
- Andrew Jackson Harris
- William Kercheval Homan
- Joseph Chappell Hutcheson
- John Marks Moore
- Absolom C. Oliver
- George C. Pendleton—District 24
- Thomas A. Rodríguez
- George Robertson Reeves
- Benjamin Dudley Tarlton
- George T. Todd
- Arthur Tompkins
- John Henry Traylor
- James W. Truitt
- William Wallace Weatherred
- Charles Louis Wurzbach
- G. W. Wyatt
- Alexander John Leo

== Membership changes ==
District	Outgoing Senator	Reason for Vacancy	Successor	Date of Successor's Installation
District 10	Asa E. Stratton, Jr.	Stratton resigned May 14, 1884.	Vacant	
District 19	Avery L. Matlock	Matlock resigned September 24, 1884.	Vacant	
