= George C. Pendleton =

American politician (1845–1913)

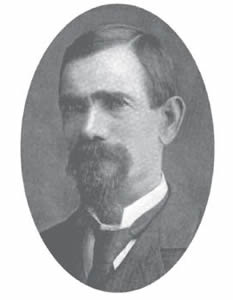

Member of the U.S. House of Representatives from Texas's 7th district
- In office March 4, 1893 – March 3, 1897
- Preceded by: William H. Crain
- Succeeded by: Robert Lee Henry

17th Lieutenant Governor of Texas
- In office January 21, 1891 – January 17, 1893
- Governor: Jim Hogg
- Preceded by: Thomas Benton Wheeler
- Succeeded by: Martin McNulty Crane

Speaker of the Texas House of Representatives
- In office January 11, 1887 – January 8, 1889
- Preceded by: Lafayette L. Foster
- Succeeded by: Frank P. Alexander

Member of the Texas House of Representatives from the 56th district
- In office January 9, 1883 – January 8, 1889
- Preceded by: Benjamin Dudley Tarlton
- Succeeded by: Benjamin Josephus Roop

Personal details
- Born: George Cassety Pendleton; April 23, 1845 Coffee County, Tennessee, U.S.
- Died: January 19, 1913 (aged 67) Temple, Texas, U.S.
- Party: Democratic
- Spouse: Helen Embree (m. 1870)
- Children: 5

Military service
- Allegiance: Confederacy
- Branch/service: Confederate States Army
- Years of service: 1862–1865
- Rank: Private
- Unit: Company C, 19th Texas Cavalry Regiment
- Battles/wars: American Civil War

George Cassety Pendleton (April 23, 1845 – January 19, 1913) was an American Democratic politician who was a member and Speaker of the Texas House of Representatives, a Lieutenant Governor of Texas, and a U.S. Representative from the 7th district of Texas.

== Early life and service in the Civil War ==
George Cassety Pendleton was born to Edmund Gaines "Ned" Pendleton and Sarah (née Smartt) Pendleton in Coffee County, Tennessee, near the town of Viola in Warren County. In 1857, the family moved to Ellis County, Texas. Pendleton was as a private in the Confederate Army, joining after the beginning of the Civil War and saw action with the Nineteenth Texas Cavalry in the Trans-Mississippi Department. His father was a member of the Texas House of Representatives during the Civil War. After the war he returned to Texas and enrolled in Waxahachie Academy, but was forced by illness to withdraw. In an effort to regain his strength through work, Pendleton accepted a job as a traveling salesman for a Dallas implement company. He remained with the firm for ten years. In 1870, he married Helen Embree of Belton, Texas. The couple raised five children. During 1881 and 1882 Pendleton lived in Bell County, Texas, first in Old Howard, and later, after the Santa Fe Railroad bypassed that village, at Pendleton, where he was involved in various business pursuits for a short time. His experiences as a farmer apparently drew him to the activities of the Grange for a time. In 1882 he moved to Temple, where he entered the land abstract and title firm of his brother-in-law, William E. Hill, and A. M. Monteith.

== Political career ==
Pendleton was a delegate to every Democratic State convention from 1876 to 1910. Pendleton was selected as state representative of the Fifty-sixth District, which included Bell County, and retained office for the Eighteenth, Nineteenth, and Twentieth legislatures; he served as Speaker of the House in 1887–1889. Between 1883 and 1889, while a member of the state legislature, he held a number of positions within the state's Democratic Party, including chairman pro tem of both the antiprohibition state convention of May 1887 and the state convention in 1888. The 1890 Democratic state convention, cognizant of Pendleton's Granger past, nominated him as gubernatorial candidate James S. Hogg's running mate on a platform designed to appeal to the state's agrarian voters during this period of farmer activism. Following Hogg's victory, Pendleton served as Lieutenant Governor of Texas from 1891 through 1893 under Governor James S. Hogg. In 1892 he successfully sought election to Congress from the state's seventh district, which included Bell, Falls, McLennan, Freestone, Limestone, Milam, Brazos, and Robertson counties. He served two terms in Washington and was a delegate to the Democratic National Convention in Chicago in 1896.

== Life after Congress ==
After returning to Temple in 1897, Pendleton entered banking and studied law in his spare time. He was admitted to the bar in 1900 and practiced law until his death. He also remained active in Democratic politics during his later years, serving as a chairman pro tem of the state convention in 1902 and holding a seat on the committee on platform and resolutions in 1904. In the latter position he presented a minority report that encouraged state control over interstate corporations operating in Texas. He also called for an investigation of Senator Joseph W. Bailey's relationship with the Standard Oil Company. After the election of Woodrow Wilson to the presidency in 1912, Pendleton was to be appointed Postmaster of Temple, a post no doubt intended as a reward for his long service to the Democratic party. The appointment was never made, however, for he died on January 19, 1913, after suffering a stroke. He was buried in Hillcrest Cemetery in Temple.

== Personal life ==
George Pendleton married Helen Embree, born in Kentucky and daughter of Elisha Embree, in 1870. One of his siblings, William Smartt Pendleton, was a member of the Texas House of Representatives from 1885 to 1887, a Tarrant County county attorney, Mayor of Fort Worth in 1890 until his resignation on July 14, and a county judge of Pottawatomie County, Oklahoma.

Texas House of Representatives
Preceded by Benjamin Dudley Tarlton	Member of the Texas House of Representatives from District 56 (Temple); 1883–1889	Succeeded by Benjamin Josephus Roop
Preceded by Lafayette Lumpkin Foster	Speaker of the Texas House of Representatives; 1887–1889	Succeeded by Franklin Pierce Alexander
U.S. House of Representatives
Preceded by William Henry Crain	Member of the U.S. House of Representatives from Texas's 7th congressional district 1893–1897	Succeeded by Robert Lee Henry
Political offices
Preceded by Thomas Benton Wheeler	Lieutenant Governor of Texas; 1891–1893	Succeeded by Martin McNulty Crane
