= Lafayette Foster =

Lafayette Foster may refer to:

- Lafayette S. Foster (1806–1880), judge and U.S. Senator from Connecticut
- Lafayette L. Foster (1851–1901), Texas politician and journalist
