= 20th Texas Legislature =

The 20th Texas Legislature met from January 11 to April 4, 1887, in regular session, and from April 16 to May 15, 1888, in a called session. All members of the House of Representatives and a portion of the members of the Senate were elected in the 1886 general election.

== Sessions ==
- 20th Regular session: January 11, 1887 – April 4, 1887
- 20th First called session: April 16, 1888 – May 15, 1888

== Party summary ==
=== House of Representatives ===
Affiliation	Members	Note
Democratic Party	91	
Republican Party	2	
People's Party	1	
Total	94	

== Officers ==
=== Senate ===
- Lieutenant Governor: Thomas Benton Wheeler, Democrat
- President pro tempore:
  - William Henry Pope, Democrat, Regular session
  - Caleb J. Garrison, Democrat, Regular session
  - John Woods, Democrat, First called session

=== House of Representatives ===
- Speaker of the House: George C. Pendleton, Democrat

Source material was unclear in which order the two Presidents pro tempore served.

== Members ==
Members of the Twentieth Texas Legislature as of the beginning of the Regular Session, January 11, 1887:

=== Senate ===
District	Senator	Party	Took office
1	William L. Douglass		1885
2	Caleb Jackson Garrison	Democrat	1885
3	William Henry Pope	Democrat	1883
4	William Thomas Armistead	Democrat	1887
5	Samuel D. Stinson		1885
6	John Lafayette Camp, Jr.		1885
7	Alexander White Gregg		1887
8	William W. Davis		1887
9	Leonard Anderson Abercrombie	Democrat	1887
10	John M. Claiborne		1887
11	John Woods	Democrat	1885
12	Hermann Knittel		1885
13	Jonathan Lane	Democrat	1887
14	Scott Field		1887
15	Eldred James Simkins		1887
16	J. O. Terrell	Democrat	1885
17	William Allen		1887
18	Elbridge G. Douglass		1887
19	Temple Lea Houston	Democrat	1885
20	James Jones Jarvis	Democrat	1887
21	Samuel C. Upshaw		1887
22	Richard H. Harrison		1885
23	Charles Keith Bell		1885
24	George Washington Glasscock, Jr.	Democrat	1885
25	William Henry Burges	Democrat	1887 (Prior: 1881–1883)
26	William H. Woodward		1887
27	Francis E. MacManus		1887
28	Robert Hance Burney		1887
29	James Henry Calhoun		1885
30	Louis N. Frank		1887
31	Henry D. McDonald		1887

=== House of Representatives ===
District	Representative	City	County	Party	Took office
1	Hugh Jackson	Wallisville	Jefferson	Democrat	1887
2	Talvus Wilson	Dodge	San Jacinto	Democrat	1887
3	Delana Tompkins	Emilee	Tyler	Democrat	1887
4	J. Gilleland	Mott	Nacogdoches	Democrat	1887
5	John H. Truit	Timpson	Shelby	Democrat	1887
6	Robert Teague Milner	Henderson	Rusk	Democrat	1887
7	J. Ras Jones	Pinehill	Panola	Democrat	1885
8	George A. Newton	Mount Selman	Cherokee	Democrat	1887 (prior: 1883–1885)
9	Bedford Parks	Kickapoo	Anderson	Democrat	1887
10	William Larkin	Athens	Henderson	Democrat	1887 (prior: 1879–1881)
11	N. M. Harrison	Gilmer	Upshur	Democrat	1887
12	Horatio L. Tate	Lindale	Smith	Democrat	1885
13	William Page	Crockett	Houston	Democrat	1885
14	Alexander Pope	Marshall	Harrison	Democrat	1887
15	Tom Davis	Center	Shelby	Democrat	1887
16	Lucius Whatley	Atlanta	Cass	Democrat	1887
17	William Hudgins	Texarkana	Bowie	Democrat	1887
17	William Skinner	Daingerfield	Morris	Democrat	1887
18	James Clark	Walnut Grove	Red River	Democrat	1887
19	John Stringer	Mount Vernon	Franklin	Democrat	1887 (prior: 1883–1885)
20	James M. Biard	Biardstown	Lamar	Democrat	1887
21	Andrew Nicholson	Honey Grove	Fannin	Democrat	1887 (prior: 1874–1876)
22	James Sadler	Dodd City	Lamar	Democrat	1887
23	George Patterson	Ben Franklin	Lamar	Democrat	1887 (prior: 1874–1876)
24	John Melson	Sulphur Springs	Hopkins	Democrat	1887
25	Frank P. Alexander	Greenville	Hunt	Democrat	1885
26	John Currey	Canton	Van Zandt	Democrat	1887
27	John Tolbert	Howe	Grayson	Democrat	1887
27	Free Utiger	Denison	Grayson	Democrat	1887
28	James B. Wright	McKinney	Collin	Democrat	1887
29	George Huling	Lebanon	Collin	Democrat	1887
30	Samuel H. Hargis	Gainesville	Cooke	Democrat	1887
31	Robert V. Bell	Gainesville	Grayson	Democrat	1887
32	Charles C. Bell	Denton	Denton	Democrat	1885
33	Joseph C. Rugel	Mesquite	Dallas	Democrat	1887
33	Jesse Strong	Dallas	Dallas	Democrat	1887
34	Elihu Newton	Bransford	Tarrant	Democrat	1887
35	Ephraim Heath	Rockwall	Rockwall	Democrat	1887
36	Samuel Chapman	Stubblefield	Johnson	Democrat	1887
37	William Wood	Bristol	Ellis	Democrat	1887
38	Charles Christenberry	Hubbard City	Hill	Democrat	1887
39	George Groce	Waxahachie	Ellis	Democrat	1887
40	William McGaughey	Granbury	Hood	Democrat	1885
40	W. Smith	Cranfills Gap	Bosque	Democrat	1887
41	Tully Fuller	Decatur	Wise	Democrat	1887
42	Alexander Latimer	Mineral Wells	Palo Pinto	Democrat	1887
43	James Browning	Mobeetie	Wheeler	Democrat	1883
44	Felix G. Bransford	Newport	Montague	Democrat	1887
45	John Humphreys	Aurora	Wise	Democrat	1887
46	James Jarrott	Millsap	Parker	Democrat	1887
47	Sanctus Waskom	Terrell	Kaufman	Democrat	1887
48	Marlin Garner	Bremond	Robertson	Democrat	1887
49	Clement M. Richardson	Leona	Leon	Democrat	1887
50	Amos Buchanan	Bryan	Brazos	Democrat	1887
51	William F. Sharp	Davilla	Milam	Democrat	1887 (prior: 1883–1885)
52	Houston A.P. Bassett	Anderson	Grimes	Republican	1887
53	J. Wesson Parker	Richmond	Fort Bend	Democrat	1887
54	Gilford Clegg	Trinity	Trinity	Democrat	1887
54	John Kirlicks	Houston	Harris	Democrat	1887
54	Jesse McCaleb	Willis	Montgomery	Democrat	1887
55	Jonathan Davis	Kosse	Falls	Democrat	1887
56	George Cassety Pendleton	Belton	Bell	Democrat	1883
57	James McKinney	Jones Prairie	Milam	Democrat	1885
58	A. G. Camp, Jr.	Groesbeck	Limestone	Democrat	1883
59	Robert Steele	Cotton Gin	Freestone	Democrat	1883
60	Abel Gill	Purdon	Navarro	Democrat	1887
61	Seth Mills	Waco	McLennan	Democrat	1887 (prior: 1879–1881)
62	Albert Prendergast	Waco	McLennan	Democrat	1887
63	Andrew Graves	Gatesville	Coryell	Democrat	1887
64	Benjamin Rush Plumley	Galveston	Galveston	Democrat	1887 (prior: 1871–1873, 1881–1883)
65	Walter Gresham	Galveston	Galveston	Democrat	1887
66	Charles I. Battle	Spanish Camp	Wharton	Democrat	1887
67	John Woolsey	Oakland	Colorado	Democrat	1887
68	James Shelburne	Bellville	Austin	Democrat	1887
69	George Humphreys	Bovine	Lavaca	Democrat	1887
70	Wenzel Matejowsky	Nechanitz	Fayette	Republican	1887
70	James McGuire	Ledbetter	Fayette	Democrat	1887
71	Robert J. Moore	Washington	Washington	People's Party	1883
72	Thomas Hunt	Caldwell	Burleson	Democrat	1887
73	John McClanahan	Lexington	Burleson	Democrat	1885
74	Hiram Garwood	Bastrop	Bastrop	Democrat	1887
75	E. Taylor Moore	Austin	Travis	Democrat	1885
75	Emory W. Smith	Merrilltown	Travis	Democrat	1887
76	Alexander Northington	Lampasas	Lampasas	Democrat	1887 (prior: 1876–1879)
77	John C.S. Baird	Thrifty	Brown	Democrat	1887
78	James H. Faubion	Leander	Williamson	Democrat	1885
79	Leonidas L. Shield	Trickham	Coleman	Democrat	1887
80	George Wythe Baylor	Ysleta	El Paso	Democrat	1887
81	John H. Clark	Uvalde	Uvalde	Democrat	1887
82	James Cone	Union	Wilson	Democrat	1887
83	Thomas W. Kennedy	Rio Grande City	Starr	Democrat	1885
83	Watterson Showalter	Laredo	Webb	Democrat	1887
84	J. Haines	Junction City	Kimble	Democrat	1887
85	Thomas A. Blair	Oakville	Live Oak	Democrat	1887
86	John Light	Sayers	Bexar	Democrat	1887
86	David Robinson	San Antonio	Bexar	Democrat	1887
87	Jonathan Payne	Goliad	Goliad	Democrat	1887 (prior: 1873–1874)
87	George Staples	Edna	Jackson	Democrat	1887
88	Francis Latham	Brownsville	Cameron	Democrat	1883 (prior: 1855–1859)
89	Carl Goeth	Cypress Mill	Blanco	Democrat	1887
90	Joseph Boothe	Gonzales	Gonzales	Democrat	1887
91	Jacob Ellison	Martindale	Caldwell	Democrat	1887
91	George McGehee	San Marcos	Hays	Democrat	1887
92	Nelson Dolen	Houston	Harris	Democrat	1887
93	William C. "Cone" Johnson	Tyler	Smith	Democrat	1887
94	John Voorhees	Andrews	Wood	Democrat	1887

Source material was unclear in which order the representatives served or if they served concurrently.

== Membership changes ==
=== Senate ===
District	Outgoing Senator	Reason for Vacancy	Successor	Date of Successor's Installation
District 22	Richard H. Harrison	Harrison resigned April 20, 1887.	Waller Saunders Baker	April 16, 1888

- District 22: Baker elected in special election June 4, 1887.

=== House of Representatives ===
District	Outgoing Representative	Reason for Vacancy	Successor	Date of Successor's Installation
District 45	John Humphreys	Representative Humphreys resigned after end of regular session (April 4, 1887).	Joel W. Booth	April 16, 1888
District 46	James Jarrott	Representative Jarrott resigned between sessions.	None	
District 64	Benjamin Rush Plumley	Representative Plumley died on December 9, 1887.	Guy Morrison Bryan	May 2, 1888
District 81	John H. Clark	Representative Clark resigned on June 4, 1888.	None	
District 86	David Robinson	Representative Robinson resigned after end of First called session (May 15, 1888).	None	

- District 45: Special election held June 4, 1887, Joel W. Booth declared winner and sworn in at beginning of First called session.
