= 19th Texas Legislature =

The 19th Texas Legislature met from January 13 to March 31, 1885, in its regular session. All members of the House of Representatives and about half of the members of the Senate were elected in 1884 General Election.

== Sessions ==
- 19th Regular session: January 13–March 31, 1885

== Officers ==
=== Senate ===
Lieutenant Governor
Barnett Gibbs, Democrat
President pro tempore
William R. Shannon, Democrat, Regular session
Constantine Buckley "Buck" Kilgore, Democrat, ad interim

=== House of Representatives ===
Speaker of the House
Lafayette Lumpkin Foster, Democrat

== Members ==
Members of the Nineteenth Texas Legislature as of the beginning of the Regular Session, January 13, 1885:

=== Senate ===
District	Senator	Party	Took office
1	William L. Douglass		1885
2	Caleb Jackson Garrison		1885
3	William Henry Pope	Democrat	1883
4	John A. Peacock		1883
5	Samuel D. Stinson		1885
6	John Lafayette Camp, Jr.		1885
7	Constantine Buckley "Buck" Kilgore	Democrat	1885
8	Mansel Y. Randolph		1883
9	James W. Jones		1883
10	W. M. Jerdone		1885
11	John Woods		1885
12	Hermann Knittel		1885
13	John P. Fowler		1883
14	James S. Perry		1883
15	Lochlin Johnson Farrar		1883
16	J. O. Terrell		1885
17	John Johnson		1883
18	William O. Davis		1882
19	Temple Lea Houston		1885
20	William R. Shannon	Democrat	1879 (Prior: 1865–1867)
21	William H. Getzendaner		1883
22	Richard H. Harrison		1885
23	Charles Keith Bell		1885
24	George Washington Glasscock, Jr.		1885
25	George Pfeuffer		1883
26	Rudolph Kleberg		1883
27	E. F. Hall		1885
28	Augustus W. Houston	Democrat	1879
29	James Henry Calhoun		1885
30	John Henry Traylor		1883
31	William A. Evans		1883

=== House of Representatives ===
Members of the House of Representatives for the Nineteenth Texas Legislature:

- Frank P. Alexander
- William T. Armistead
- Edwin Augustus Atlee
- Milton Stanhope Austin
- John Bailey
- Joseph Weir Barnett
- John Andrew Virgil Barton
- William Beard
- Charles C. Bell
- Oscar B. Bergstrom
- William Preston Bishop
- Kenneth Royal Blackshear
- James P. Blount
- Stephen William Blount
- Robert Joseph Brailsford
- James Browning
- Angero Grey Camp
- Benjamin M. Camp
- Daniel Milton Carleton
- William John Caven
- William Richard Cavitt
- Gideon Christian
- William D. Cochran (politician)
- James Henry Combs
- Thomas Chappel Cook
- Zachariah Ellis Coombs
- James Robb Cowles
- George Russell Craft
- Martin McNulty Crane
- Nehemiah Andrew Cravens
- Daniel Chambers Darroch
- Benjamin F. Davis
- George Washington Donalson
- James Henry Faubion
- Lorenzo Clarke Fisher
- Lafayette Lumpkin Foster
- Robert Coleman Foster
- Frank Bailey Greenwood
- Adolph Carl Ludwig Groos
- Addison Yancey Gunter
- Robert T. Hailey
- William Oscar Hamilton
- William Powell Hancock
- Harry Haynes
- David Thomas Hearne
- Travis Clark Henderson
- Joseph Wesley Humphrey
- George Francis Ingraham
- James Marion Jolley
- Edward A. Jones
- J. Ras Jones
- William Henry Jones
- Thomas W. Kennedy
- John Powell Key
- Robert Snead Kimbrough
- John Rhodes King
- Francis William Latham
- Thomas Hamilton Lenox
- Edward Daniel Linn
- William Henry Lockett
- Jesse P. Loving
- Marcellus French Lowe
- William McGaughey
- Andrew Todd McKinney
- John Guilford McReynolds
- William Thomas Meriwether
- Edward Taylor Moore
- Robert J. Moore
- Philander Burr Muse
- William Butler Page
- George Cassety Pendleton
- William Smartt Pendleton
- Samuel Porter Pounders
- Alexis Theodore Rainey
- John A. Ramsdell
- James M. Robinson
- James R. Robinson
- John W. Rountree
- Whitfield Scott
- Frank W. Simmons
- Felix Ezell Smith
- Robert E. Steele
- Charles Frederick Stevens
- James H. Stewart
- Marshall Tankersley
- Benjamin Dudley Tarlton
- Horatio Lorenzo Tate
- Alsey Marcellus Taylor
- William Lafayette Thompson
- William Harrison Tipton
- George Isbell Turnley
- Ammon Underwood
- William Felton Upton
- Armistead Elisha Watson
- Joseph T. Webb
- Missouri Henneger Whaley
- James Knox White
- Benjamin Franklin Williams
- Richard Henry Wood
- James Stanton Woods
- Elijah Fisk Yeager

== Membership Changes ==
=== Senate ===
District	Outgoing senator	Reason for vacancy	Successor	Date of successor's installation
District 7	Constantine Buckley "Buck" Kilgore	Kilgore resigned October 23, 1886 to seek election to the Fiftieth United States Congress	Vacant	
District 25	George Pfeuffer	Pfeuffer died September 15, 1886	Vacant	
District 26	Rudolph Kleberg	Kleberg resigned September 9, 1886	Vacant	
District 27	E. F. Hall	Hall died April 28, 1886	Vacant	

c
