= Frank P. Alexander =

American legislator from Texas

Speaker of the Texas House of Representatives
- In office 1889–1891
- Preceded by: George C. Pendleton
- Succeeded by: Robert Teague Milner

Personal details
- Born: Franklin Pierce Alexander
- Party: Democratic

Frank P. Alexander was an American lawmaker from Texas who served as the Speaker of the Texas House of Representatives for the 21st Texas Legislature.

Alexander was born in Pickens, South Carolina on September 1, 1853. He moved to Jefferson, Texas in 1870 and by 1872 was an editor for the Daily Jefferson Democrat where he worked until 1874. He moved to Greenville, Texas in 1876 and became the editor of the Greenville Independent before launching the Greenville Herald in 1879, then selling the Herald to James H. Davis in 1883. He later became involved in the insurance business.

Alexander ran unsuccessfully for the Texas Legislature in 1882. He won his first election in 1884 and served in the 19th Texas Legislature, representing Hunt County, Texas as a Democrat. He was re-elected for the 20th and 21st Texas Legislature, serving as the Speaker of the Texas House of Representatives in his final session from 1889 to 1891. While a legislature, he led the proposal of a bill to create the Railroad Commission of Texas.

After leaving the legislature, he moved his family to Alva, Oklahoma for the opening of the Cherokee Strip Land Run, serving as the registrar of the territory. He was also involved with other publications until his death on August 25, 1913.
