= William Hal Aldridge =

American politician (1867–1921)

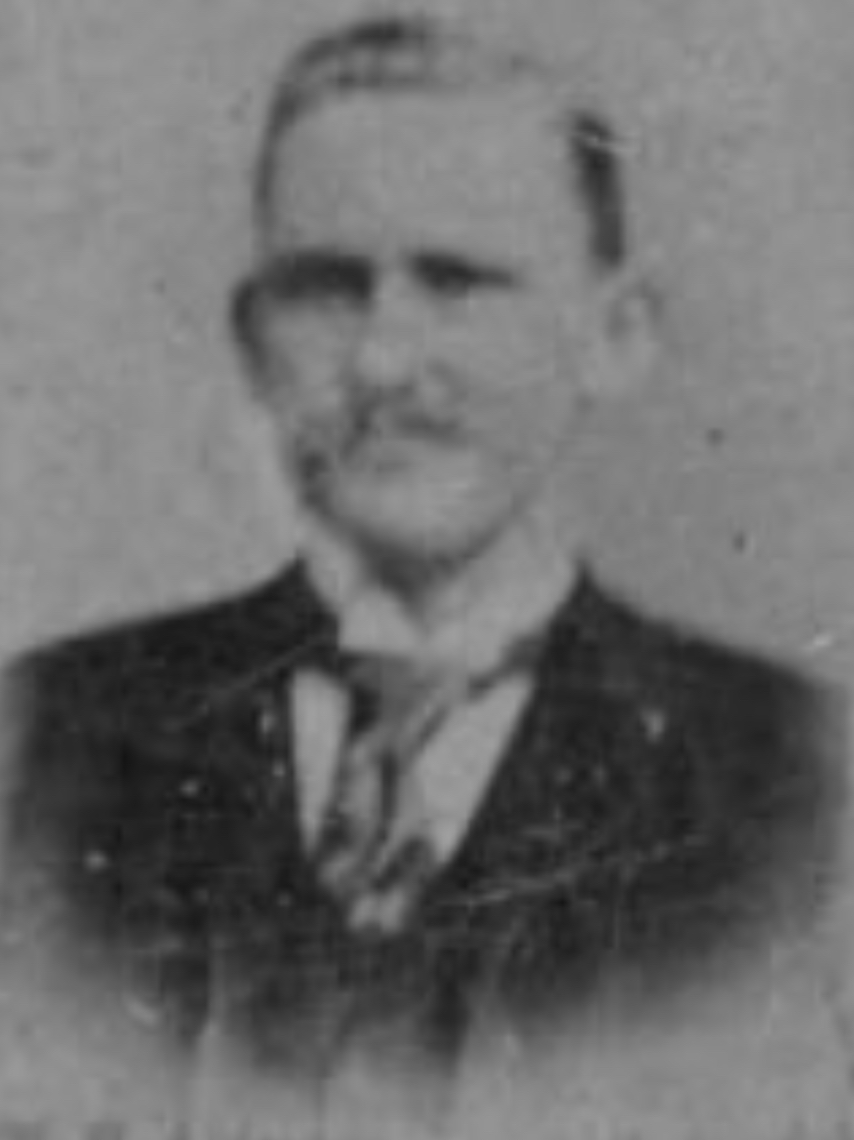
- Aldridge in 1893

Member of the Texas House of Representatives from the 36th district
- In office January 10, 1893 – January 8, 1895

Personal details
- Born: February 26, 1867; Tallahatchie County, Mississippi, US
- Died: February 28, 1921 (aged 54)
- Political party: Democratic

William Hal Aldridge (February 26, 1867 – February 28, 1921) was an American politician.

== Biography ==
Aldridge was born on February 26, 1867, in Tallahatchie County, Mississippi, now Grenada County, to William Harris and Sarah Eliza Aldridge (née Tolbert). In 1880, his older Frank left for Beaumont, Texas, becoming a successful railwayman and lumberman who worked with John Henry Kirby. William and his younger brother Charles joined Frank c. 1884, also becoming successful. In 1890, he became co-owner of the Rockland Lumber Company, renaming it to the Aldridge Lumber Company in 1891. His business settled the communities of Aldridge, Jasper County, Texas and Aldridge, Angelina County, Texas, in 1898 and 1903 respectively.

He served in the 23rd Texas Legislature, from January 10, 1893, to January 8, 1895, representing the 36th district.
