= Harriel G. Geiger =

American politician from Texas

Hal Geiger

Member of the Texas House of Representatives from the 27th district
- In office January 14, 1879 – Jan 11, 1881 Serving with J. D. Grant
- Preceded by: George U. Mead
- Succeeded by: E. C. Mobley
- In office Apr 6, 1882 – Jan 9, 1883 Serving with J. D. Grant
- Preceded by: E. C. Mobley
- Succeeded by: Robert Coleman Foster

Personal details
- Born: c. 1840 South Carolina, U.S.
- Died: June 11, 1886 (aged 45–46) Hearne, Texas, U.S.
- Cause of death: Gunshot wounds
- Party: Republican (before 1880); Greenback (after 1880)

Harriel "Hal" G. Geiger (c. 1840 – June 11, 1886) was an American politician, blacksmith, and lawyer. Born into slavery in South Carolina, he was elected to the Texas House of Representatives as a candidate for the Greenback Party. He served from January 1879 to January 1881. He lost his re-election campaign to E. C. Mobley but won the seat in a special election, after Geiger moved out of the district, and served from April 1882 until January 1883. He lost re-election in 1882 and was convicted of bribery under 18 U.S.C. § 201. He was murdered by a judge for being insolent. Geiger and Robert A. Kerr were the only African-Americans to be elected into the Texas Legislature as representatives for the Greenback Party.

Geiger was also a candidate for sheriff of Robertson County, Texas in 1884. He was murdered, shot 5 times at point blank range, by Judge O. D. Cannon for making "insolent" remarks and not showing enough deference to his honor. Geiger survived for a while before eventually succumbing to his wounds. A trial was held and the jury cleared Cannon after a brief deliberation. Judge Cannon was convicted of murdering another unarmed lawyer, one of his neighbors, in 1899.

Geiger is described as having had one eye. He opposed the poll tax and criticized the convict lease system.

== See also ==
- African American officeholders from the end of the Civil War until before 1900
