= Dethloff Willrodt =

American politician (1840–1932)

Member of the Texas House of Representatives from the 42nd district
- In office January 10, 1899 – January 8, 1901
- Preceded by: Frank Lotto
- Succeeded by: Charles C. Glenn

Personal details
- Born: January 19, 1840 Lütjenburg, Duchy of Holstein (now Lütjenburg, Germany)
- Died: June 12, 1932 (aged 92) Austin County, Texas, U.S.
- Resting place: Coshatte Cemetery, Bellville, Texas, U.S.
- Party: Democratic
- Spouse: Elizabeth Waak (m. 1869; died 1916)
- Children: 7
- Occupation: Businessman; carpenter; farmer; politician; soldier

Military service
- Allegiance: United States; Confederate States of America (1862)
- Branch/service: Confederate States Army; U.S. Army (Union Army)
- Years of service: 1862–1865
- Rank: Sergeant (USA); Private (CSA)
- Unit: Company C or E, Waul's Legion; Company B, 12th Illinois Cavalry Regiment
- Battles/wars: American Civil War; Battle of Brandy Station; Battle of Gettysburg; Red River campaign

Dethloff Willrodt (January 19, 1840 – June 12, 1932) was an American Civil War veteran, businessman, carpenter, farmer, and politician. He was a member of the Texas House of Representatives from the 42nd district from 1899 to 1901.

Born in Lütjenburg in the Duchy of Holstein, eight years before the First Schleswig War, he was encouraged to emigrate to the New World by his father, also named Dethloff Willrodt. After arriving in New York from the port of Hamburg, he found his way to relatives in Macoupin County, Illinois. He worked for a year as a farm hand before moving to Texas, where he worked as a carpenter. Opposed to slavery and the idea of secession, he was a victim of the conscription acts of the Confederacy and was enrolled into Waul's Legion. He was captured at Oxford, Mississippi, and was given the opportunity to enlist in the Union Army. He fought in several battles including the first day of the Battle of Gettysburg on July 1, 1863, reached the rank of sergeant, and eventually commanded his own company.

Postbellum, Willrodt resumed practicing carpentry, married Elizabeth Waak in 1869, became a farmer, and organized the Mercantile Company of Bellville. He was first elected to be a county commissioner for Austin County, Texas, from the first precinct, then was elected to the Texas Legislature in 1898. He died in Austin County in 1932, at the age of 92.

== Biography ==
Dethloff Willrodt was born on January 19, 1840, in Lütjenburg, the fourth son and sixth child of seven children born to Dethloff Willrodt and his wife Margaret Herbst. The elder Dethloff Willrodt had fought on the German side against Napoleon in 1812.

Willrodt attended the local schools in Holstein. His mother and father died when he was aged 5 and 17, respectively. Acting in part on his fathers advice and his own exploratory aspirations, he sailed unaccompanied from Hamburg to the United States. After his arrival at New York, he found his way to relatives in Macoupin County, Illinois, without knowing the English language. He worked as a farm hand for a year, then he visited his older brother Ernst who lived in Texas. Willrodt worked as a carpenter for two years before he became a soldier in the American Civil War. He attended a private school in Texas to learn English.

Like most Texas Germans and German Americans, Willrodt opposed slavery, and the short time he spent in the North had increased his opposition to secession. However, he was conscripted into the Confederate army and enrolled into Waul's Legion, as was his brother Ernst. Ernst later died during the war with the Confederate army at Canton, Mississippi.

Willrodt fell behind during a retreat to Grenada, Mississippi, from Rocky Ford and was captured by the Union Army at Oxford, Mississippi. He was sent to Fort Defiance in Cairo, Illinois, and was given the opportunity to enlist in the Union Army, which he accepted. Willrodt became a recruit to the 12th Illinois Cavalry Regiment. In May 1863, his regiment fought at Warrenton, Virginia, and afterwards dashed to Yorktown, Virginia. His regiment fought at the Battle of Brandy Station as part of the cavalry led by John Buford, and was engaged in many cavalry skirmishes on the way to Gettysburg. He was involved in the opening of the battle on July 1st, when he belonged to Gamble's Brigade. After the battle the regiment was ordered to Chicago and was recruited to 1,200 men. It was sent to New Orleans then sent to the Red River campaign. The regiment was later sent on raids from Baton Rouge into Mississippi and to the head of the Pearl River. It was then ordered back to Memphis, Tennessee, where it was stationed when news of Robert E. Lee's surrender after the Battle of Appomattox Court House arrived. The regiment proceeded under general George Armstrong Custer to Alexandria, Louisiana, where they were camped for a time before being sent to Hempstead, Texas. The main body of the regiment was sent to Houston, but Willrodt's company was sent to Columbia, Texas. Although the rank of sergeant, Willrodt had command of his company. He was mustered out at Houston on December 20, 1865.

Willrodt resumed working as a carpenter after the war in Bellville, Texas. He married Elizabeth Waak, the daughter of Henry Waak on February 5, 1869. He built his home in Piney. In 1884 he came to his farm on the Thomas Bell League, where he owned 200 acres. As a farmer, he primarily grew corn and cotton and raised stock. He was the organizer of the Mercantile Company of Bellville and was one of its stockholders.

He first entered public service when he was elected to be a county commissioner for Austin County from the first precinct and served for four years. He was elected to be a member of the Texas House of Representatives in 1898 for the 26th Texas Legislature. In the legislature, he was a member of the House Committee on Public Buildings and Grounds and the House Committee on Penitentiaries. He voted for Charles Culberson for United States senator. He acted with the Republican Party in national affairs until 1912, at that time he viewed the split of the party with alarm, and voted for Woodrow Wilson. Willrodt was an honorary member of the Sons of Hermann and was a Lutheran. He died on June 12, 1932, at the age of 92, and was interred in the Coshatte Cemetery on June 13, 1932.

== Personal life ==
Willrodt had seven children with Elizabeth Waak. William, his oldest son, was a Bellville merchant and was the treasurer of Austin County. His other sons, Herman, Ernst, and Richard became farmers. His daughter Minna married G. H. Graf of Houston. Another daughter married G. H. Crawford of Bellville.

Texas House of Representatives
Preceded by Frank Lotto	Member of the Texas House of Representatives from District 42 (Bellville); 1899–1901	Succeeded by Charles Cantrell Glenn
