= George U. Mead =

American politician, doctor (1832–1894)

George U. Mead (1832-June 3, 1894) was a doctor and state legislator in Texas. A Republican, he served in the Texas House of Representatives in 1876.

He was born in New York and schooled in New York City. He came to Texas in 1868. He lived in Calvert, Texas, the county seat of Robertson County, Texas.

He was a commissioned officer with the New York Volunteers. He was a quartermaster.

He was succeeded by Harriel G. Geiger.
