= Aldridge, Angelina County, Texas =

Ghost town in Texas, US

Aldridge
- Ghost town
- Country: United States
- State: Texas
- County: Angelina
- Named for: William Hal Aldridge

Aldridge is a ghost town in Angelina County, Texas, United States. Situated on the Neches River, it was founded by William Hal Aldridge in 1903, who built a sawmill. A post office operated there in 1906, and the community was abandoned by the 1920s.
