= Houston A.P. Bassett =

American politician

Houston A.P. (Pat) Bassett

Texas State Representative for District 52 (Grimes County)
- In office January 11, 1887 – January 8, 1889

Personal details
- Born: March 14, 1857 Grimes County, Texas, USA
- Died: July 17, 1920 (aged 63) Grimes County, Texas
- Party: Republican
- Spouse: Cordelia Foster Bassett
- Children: 4
- Education: Straight University; Fisk University

Houston A.P. (Pat) Bassett (March 14, 1857 – July 17, 1920) was an African-American Republican politician who served in the Twentieth Texas Legislature. The son of poor farmers, Bassett lived in his native Grimes County, Texas, for most of his life. He was educated at Straight University in New Orleans, Louisiana, and Fisk University in Nashville, Tennessee. Upon returning to Texas, he became involved in politics and won a contested election for the Texas House of Representatives in 1886. He served only one term. He and his wife, the former Cordelia Foster, had four children.

He and 51 other African Americans who served in Texas during the 19th century are commemorated on a memorial dedicated in 2010.

== See also ==
- African American officeholders from the end of the Civil War until before 1900
