= Richard Raymond (Texas politician) =

Texas state legislator

Richard Peña Raymond

Member of the Texas House of Representatives
- Incumbent
- Assumed office January 24, 2001
- Preceded by: Henry Cuellar
- Constituency: 42nd district
- In office January 12, 1993 – January 12, 1999
- Preceded by: Ernestine Glossbrenner
- Succeeded by: Ignacio Salinas Jr.
- Constituency: 44th district

Personal details
- Born: Richard Edward Raymond; October 27, 1960 (age 65) Alice, Texas, U.S.
- Party: Democratic
- Children: Aren; Eva; Ryan
- Parents: Gabriel Charles Sr.; Evelia Peña Raymond
- Relatives: Joe Rubio Jr. (cousin)
- Education: Laredo Community College; University of Texas at Austin; University of Texas School of Law
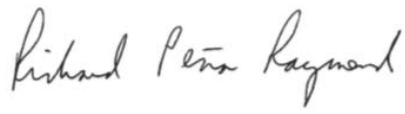
- Signature
- Website: Office website Campaign website

Richard Pena Raymond (born October 27, 1960) is a Democratic member of the Texas House of Representatives for District 42, which encompasses western Webb County and includes the city of Laredo. He is a member of the State Affairs Committee and the Elections Committee. He is the longest-serving Hispanic Latino State Representative in the United States, currently in office.

== Election history ==
=== 2006 ===
Texas general election, 2006: House District 42
| Party | Candidate | Votes | % | ±% |
|---|---|---|---|---|
| Democratic | Richard Raymond | 12,787 | 100.00 | |
| Majority | | 12,787 | 100.00 | −52.86 |
| Turnout | | 12,787 | | −52.86 |
| Democratic hold | | | | |

Democratic Party Primary Runoff Election, 2006: House District 42
| Candidate | | Votes | % | ± |
|---|---|---|---|---|
| | Mercurio Martinez Jr. | 6,456 | 42.24 | |
| ✓ | Richard Raymond | 8,828 | 57.76 | |
| Turnout | | 15,284 | | |

Democratic Party Primary Election, 2006: House District 42
| Candidate | | Votes | % | ± |
|---|---|---|---|---|
| ✓ | Mercurio Martinez Jr. | 7,650 | 32.89 | |
| | Sergio Mora | 3,048 | 12.87 | |
| | Jose "Rudy" Ochoa | 1,184 | 5.00 | |
| ✓ | Richard Raymond | 11,806 | 49.84 | |
| Turnout | | 23,688 | | |

=== 2004 ===
Texas general election, 2004: House District 42
| Party | Candidate | Votes | % | ±% |
|---|---|---|---|---|
| Democratic | Richard Raymond | 27,123 | 100.00 | 0.00 |
| Majority | | 27,123 | 100.00 | +0.60 |
| Turnout | | 27,123 | | +0.60 |
| Democratic hold | | | | |

=== 2002 ===
Texas general election, 2002: House District 42
| Party | Candidate | Votes | % | ±% |
|---|---|---|---|---|
| Democratic | Richard Raymond | 26,961 | 100.00 | 0.00 |
| Majority | | 26,961 | 100.00 | +16.77 |
| Turnout | | 26,961 | | +16.77 |
| Democratic hold | | | | |

=== 2001 ===
Special Election, 20 January 2001: House District 42, Unexpired
| Party | Candidate | Votes | % | ±% |
|---|---|---|---|---|
| Democratic | Carlos Ygnacio "Cy" Benavides | 2,409 | 18.63 | |
| Democratic | Javier H. Martinez Jr. | 1,743 | 13.48 | |
| Democratic | Maria Elena Morales | 1,676 | 12.96 | |
| Democratic | Richard Raymond | 7,090 | 54.83 | |
| Write-In | Mickey Mouse | 1 | 0.01 | |
| Write-In | None of the Above | 1 | 0.01 | |
| Write-In | George Bush | 1 | 0.01 | |
| Write-In | Donald Duck | 1 | 0.01 | |
| Write-In | Jerry Garza | 1 | 0.01 | |
| Write-In | Joe Guerra | 1 | 0.01 | |
| Write-In | Mike Kazen | 3 | 0.02 | |
| Write-In | Richard Raymond | 2 | 0.02 | |
| Write-In | L.A. Tadro | 1 | 0.01 | |
| Majority | | 26,961 | 100.00 | |
| Turnout | | 12,930 | | |
| Democratic hold | | | | |

=== 1998 ===
Texas general election, 1998: Land Commissioner
| Party | Candidate | Votes | % | ±% |
|---|---|---|---|---|
| Republican | David Dewhurst | 2,072,604 | 57.42 | +10.22 |
| Democratic | Richard Raymond | 1,438,378 | 39.85 | −10.34 |
| Libertarian | J. Manuel "Monte" Montez | 98,321 | 2.72 | +0.12 |
| Majority | | 634,226 | 17.57 | +510.04 |
| Turnout | | 3,609,303 | | −13.29 |
| Republican gain from Democratic | | | | |

=== 1996 ===
Texas general election, 1996: House District 44
| Party | Candidate | Votes | % | ±% |
|---|---|---|---|---|
| Democratic | Richard Raymond | 26,942 | 100.00 | 0.00 |
| Majority | | 26,942 | 100.00 | |
| Turnout | | 26,942 | | +23.55 |
| Democratic hold | | | | |

=== 1994 ===
Texas general election, 1994: House District 44
| Party | Candidate | Votes | % | ±% |
|---|---|---|---|---|
| Democratic | Richard Raymond | 21,443 | 100.00 | 0.00 |
| Majority | | 21,443 | 100.00 | |
| Turnout | | 21,443 | | −26.50 |
| Democratic hold | | | | |

=== 1992 ===
Texas general election, 1992: House District 44
| Party | Candidate | Votes | % | ±% |
|---|---|---|---|---|
| Democratic | Richard Raymond | 29,174 | 100.00 | |
| Majority | | 29,174 | 100.00 | |
| Turnout | | 29,174 | | |
| Democratic hold | | | | |

Democratic Party Primary Runoff Election, 1992: House District 44
| Candidate | | Votes | % | ± |
|---|---|---|---|---|
| | Tom Cate | 4,781 | 31.65 | |
| ✓ | Richard Raymond | 10,322 | 68.35 | |
| Turnout | | 15,103 | | |

Democratic Party Primary Election, 1992: House District 44
| Candidate | | Votes | % | ± |
|---|---|---|---|---|
| ✓ | Tom Cate (formerly District 45) | 9,706 | 39.83 | |
| | Alberto T. Martinez | 6,714 | 27.55 | |
| ✓ | Richard Raymond | 7,945 | 32.60 | |
| Turnout | | 24,365 | | |

== Notes ==
Party political offices
| Preceded by Garry Mauro | Democratic nominee for Land Commissioner of Texas; 1998 | Succeeded by David Bernsen |
Texas House of Representatives
| Preceded by Henry R. Cuellar | Texas State Representative for District 42 (Webb County); 2001– | Succeeded by Incumbent |
| Preceded by Ernestine Glossbrenner | Texas State Representative for District 44 (including Duval County); 1993–1999 | Succeeded by Ignacio Salinas Jr. |
