= Leah Moncure =

American engineer (1904–1972)

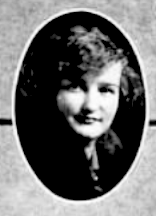
- Portrait from Baylor University's Roundup yearbook, 1924
- Born: June 7, 1904; Bastrop, Texas
- Died: January 17, 1972 (aged 67); Bastrop, Texas
- Education: Baylor University; University of Texas
- Occupation: Civil engineer
- Employer: Texas Highway Department

Leah Moncure (June 7, 1904 - January 17, 1972) was the first woman licensed as a professional engineer in the state of Texas, the first female engineer to work for the Texas Highway Department (TxDOT) and the first female life member of the National Society of Professional Engineers.

In January 2025, the Texas Historical Commission honored Moncure with a historical marker in front of her former longtime residence in Bastrop, Texas.

== Early life and education ==
One of four daughters, Moncure was born in Bastrop to Cassius Lee (C.L.) Moncure and Hattie Nuckols Moncure. Her father was Bastrop County surveyor and a civil engineer. He had succeeded his father J.J. Moncure in the position.

At a young age, Leah was diagnosed with a congenital heart defect that led doctors to predict she would not survive childhood. She would prove them wrong. She showed an early interest in her father's profession, learning about the equipment and practices of the surveying trade. She accompanied him on numerous field surveying trips. By the time she was in high school, she could use his transit, and understand field notes and plat maps. Before long, she was acting as a draftsman on her father's projects.

She attended Baylor University, graduating with high honors and a double major, mathematics and education, in 1925. Following graduation, she was hired to teach math at a Houston junior high school.

After a year of teaching and still determined to find work in engineering, she applied for a position with consultants Howe & Wise. The firm, which had just been awarded a three-year contract to construct county roads, brought Moncure onboard. The job included drafting and laying grade lines.

Realizing she needed a license to further her career, Moncure enrolled in the University of Texas (UT) School of Engineering. To pay tuition, her studies were interspersed with stretches of working. After two semesters at UT, she spent a summer employed with a district engineer. Sometimes, she worked an entire year before returning to her classes. She finally graduated in 1937.

On April 22, 1938, Moncure became PE #2250.

== Career ==
Moncure worked at TxDOT for 32 years. Her work took her all over Texas: Houston, Beaumont, Lufkin and Galveston, performing such varied tasks as road design, traffic/right-of way research and studies of intersection channelizing, embankment settlement and expansion joints. In 1945, she transferred to Austin. Her projects there included Harris County's plans for Highway 38, now part of State Highway 6.

== Later life and death ==
Moncure retired from TxDOT in 1964 and moved back to the family home on Main St., Bastrop. In 1965, the Travis Chapter Auxiliary of the Texas Society of Professional Engineers established the Leah Moncure Memorial Scholarship at The University of Texas for female engineering students.

Outside of her profession, she was an avid fisherman, symphony lover and member (and one time president) of the Austin Altrusa Club.

Moncure died in 1972. She is buried in Bastrop's Fairview Cemetery.

== Historical marker ==
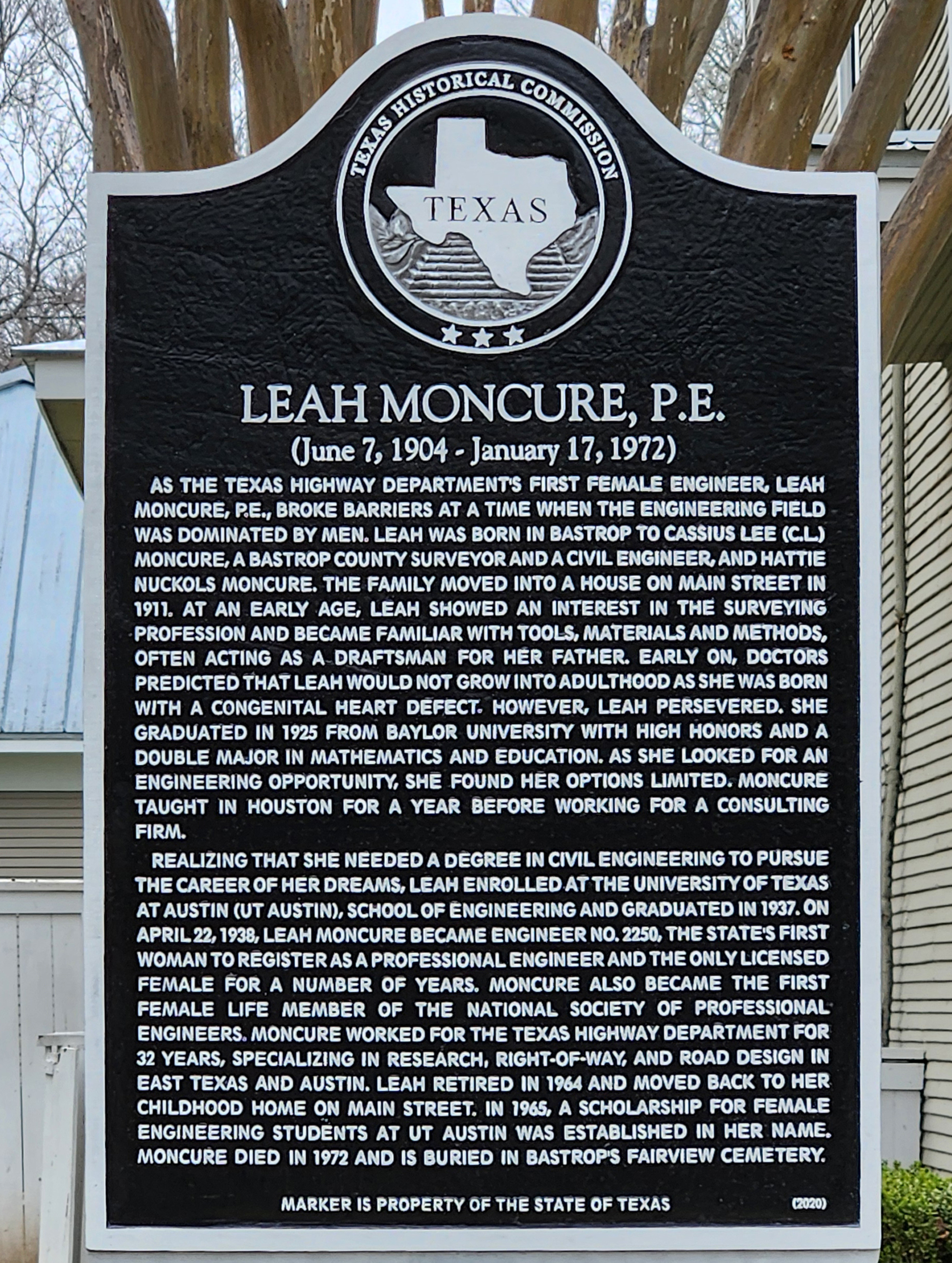
Historical marker commemorating Leah Moncure, the first female engineer registered in the state of Texas (1938)

Moncure's historical marker was dedicated on January 13, 2025, at her former home on Main St. in Bastrop. The plaque is part of Texas Historical Commission’s "Undertold" program designed to "address historical gaps, promote diversity of topics and proactively document significant underrepresented subjects or untold stories." The event was hosted by the King's Highway Chapter of the National Society Daughters of the American Revolution (NSDAR), which was instrumental in obtaining the marker, and the Bastrop County Historical Commission.

NSDAR member Sandra Chipley learned of Leah Moncure during her own years at TxDOT. Seeing the need to share and celebrate Moncure's story, she researched and wrote the marker application as a project for the King’s Highway DAR Chapter.
