= Robert A. Kerr =

American politician

Member of the Texas House of Representatives from the 62nd district
- In office January 11, 1881 – Jan 9, 1883
- Preceded by: Benjamin Franklin Jones
- Succeeded by: Lafayette L. Foster (Redistricting)

Personal details
- Born: 1833–1842 (disputed) New Orleans, U.S.
- Died: 1912–1913 (disputed) Bastrop, Texas, U.S.
- Party: Republican (until late 1870s); Greenback (late 1870s—1882); Republican (after 1882)

Robert A. Kerr (1842 – January 12, 1912) or (December 23, 1833 – January 7, 1913) or (1841 – April 28, 1912) was an American politician, barber, bookkeeper, civic leader, and shipping clerk. He helped establish the first high school for African Americans in Bastrop County, Texas, when he was a member of the Bastrop County School Board.

He was born in New Orleans and his father, known as Major A. Kerr, owned him. He was banished from San Antonio for aiding runaway slaves.

He was elected to the Texas House of Representatives as a member of the Greenback Party in 1880. He served on the Military Affairs Committee and was an opponent of the convict lease system. He ran unsuccessfully for reelection in 1882 as a Republican. Kerr was chosen as a delegate to the 1872 Republican National Convention and was chosen as an alternate delegate for the 1892 Republican National Convention. [1] He and Harriel G. Geiger were the only African-Americans to be elected into the Texas Legislature as representatives for the Greenback Party.

He had an adopted child with his wife Sarah.

Kerr is buried in Fairview Cemetery in Bastrop.

Preceded by Benjamin Franklin Jones	Member of the Texas House of Representatives from District 62 (Bastrop); 1881–1883	Succeeded by Lafayette L. Foster (Redistricting)
