= E. C. Mobley =

American politician

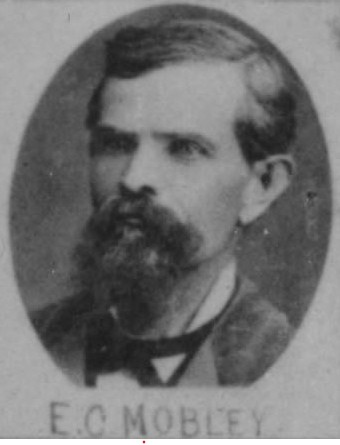
E. C. Mobley

E. C. Mobley (March 1836 or 1839/40–1913) was an American lawyer and member of the Texas House of Representatives from January 11, 1881 to August 3, 1881. He defeated Hal Geiger who was seeking re-election in Robertson County, Texas in 1881. Mobley resigned his office when he moved out of the district. Geiger won the special election to replace him. He was a lawyer and a Democrat. Originally from Georgia, he was listed as 42 years old in 1881.

== See also ==
- African American officeholders from the end of the Civil War until before 1900
