= George W. Wyatt =

American politician

George W. Wyatt (c. 1848 - ?) was a teacher and state legislator in Texas. He served in the Texas House of Representatives during the Eighteenth Texas Legislature from 1883 to 1885. A Republican, he and R. J. Moore were the only African Americans who served in the House during that term. He was a teacher in Hempstead, Texas when he was elected. He was photographed.

== See also ==
- African American officeholders from the end of the Civil War until before 1900
- Benjamin Franklin Williams
