= James Cone (politician) =

American politician (1825–1897)

James Baker Cone (March 10, 1825 – March 25, 1897) was a Texas politician for the Democrats during the Twentieth Texas Legislature. He was a member of the Knights of Labor, and clashed with the more conservative and libertarian members of his party like George Clark, who campaigned to become the nominee for Texas governor in 1892.
