= Thomas Jefferson Towles =

Member of the Texas Legislature from the 22nd district
- In office 1876, 1888

Personal details
- Born: December 29, 1843 Jones County, Georgia, U.S.
- Died: January 21, 1909 (aged 65) Canton, Texas, U.S.
- Party: Democratic

Military service
- Allegiance: Confederate States
- Branch: Confederate States Army
- Rank: Captain
- Battles: American Civil War; Battle of Brown's Mill (WIA)

Thomas Jefferson Towles (1843–1909) was a Confederate army officer and a state legislator for Texas.

== Early life ==
Thomas J. Towles was born in Jones county, Georgia, on December 29, 1843. When fourteen years of age he came to Texas, locating in Van Zandt county where he was reared and educated.

== Civil War ==
In the month of June 1861 he enlisted at Dallas in Company "G", 3rd Texas Cavalry, and served through the entire American Civil War, being in all the battles participated in by his regiment. In the progress of the fight with General McCook's troops at Newnan, on July 30, 1864, he was dangerously wounded and remained for some time within the lines of the enemy. As he was sitting against a tree, his clothing saturated with blood from his wounds, General McCook and his staff halted in front of him and after assuring him of surgical aid as soon as it could be procured he inquired what forces were opposing him on the immediate field. Lieutenant Towles replied: "You can form as correct an estimate of their numerica strength as I can, as the divisions of Jackson, Wheeler, and Roddy are present"; whereupon General McCook remarked to his staff: "We must get out of this!" and immediately rode away. This probably explains the panic with which the Federals were seized when General Ross soon after bore down upon them in the headlong charge which routed and dispersed them. He was long the brave, vigilant, and efficient commander of the brigade scouts, and as such was the eyes and ears of the command. In the discharge of this hazardous service he won the confidence of his commanding general and as General Ross said, "we always slept with a sense of security when the faithful Captain Towles was on duty".

== Later life ==
After the Confederate surrender Captain Towles returned to Van Zandt county and became a planter. He was called by the people to the office of sheriff, tax collector and representative; serving in the latter capacity in the 15th and 21st Texas legislatures where he was on important committees and rendered great service to Texas.

He died on January 21, 1909, and was buried in Hillcrest Cemetery in Canton.

== Personal ==
Towles was a Mason. He was married in Butts county, Georgia, on February 14, 1864, to Miss N. A. Nolen. They had seven children, four sons and three daughters, of whom only the two youngest, Eva and Alice, were living in 1907.

== Sources ==
- Cardwell, John (1876). Sketches of Legislators and State Officers, Fifteenth Legislature, 1876–1878 (PDF). Austin, TX: Democratic Statesman. pp. 82–3.
- Daniell, Lewis E. (1892). Personnel of the Texas State Government, with Sketches of Representative Men of Texas (3rd ed.). San Antonio, TX: Maverick.
- Hall, Margaret Elizabeth (1976). A History of Van Zandt County. Austin, TX: Jenkins.
- Kleiner, Diana J. (January 16, 2019) [May 1, 1995]. "Towles, Thomas Jefferson (1843–1909)". Handbook of Texas Online. Texas State Historical Association.
- Manning, Wentworth (1919). "Capt. Thomas Jefferson Towles". Some History of Van Zandt County. Vol. 1. Des Moines, IA: The Homestead Co. pp. 136–7.
- Moore, J. M. (1889). Biennial Report of the Secretary of State of the State of Texas: List of Senators and Representatives (PDF). Austin, TX: State Printing Office.
- Wren, David Nelson (1973). Every First Monday: A History of Canton. Quanah, TX: Nortex.
- "Twenty-First Legislature". The Galveston Daily News. January 5, 1889. p. 2.
- "[Obituary]". Wills Point Chronicle. January 28, 1909.

Attribution:

- Johnson, Sid S. (1907). "Thomas J. Towles". Texans Who Wore the Gray. Vol. 1. pp. 111–12.

== Links ==
- "Capt Thomas Jefferson Towles". Find a Grave.
- "Thomas Jefferson Towles". Legislative Reference Library of Texas.
