= Robert L. Henry =

American politician

Robert Lee Henry
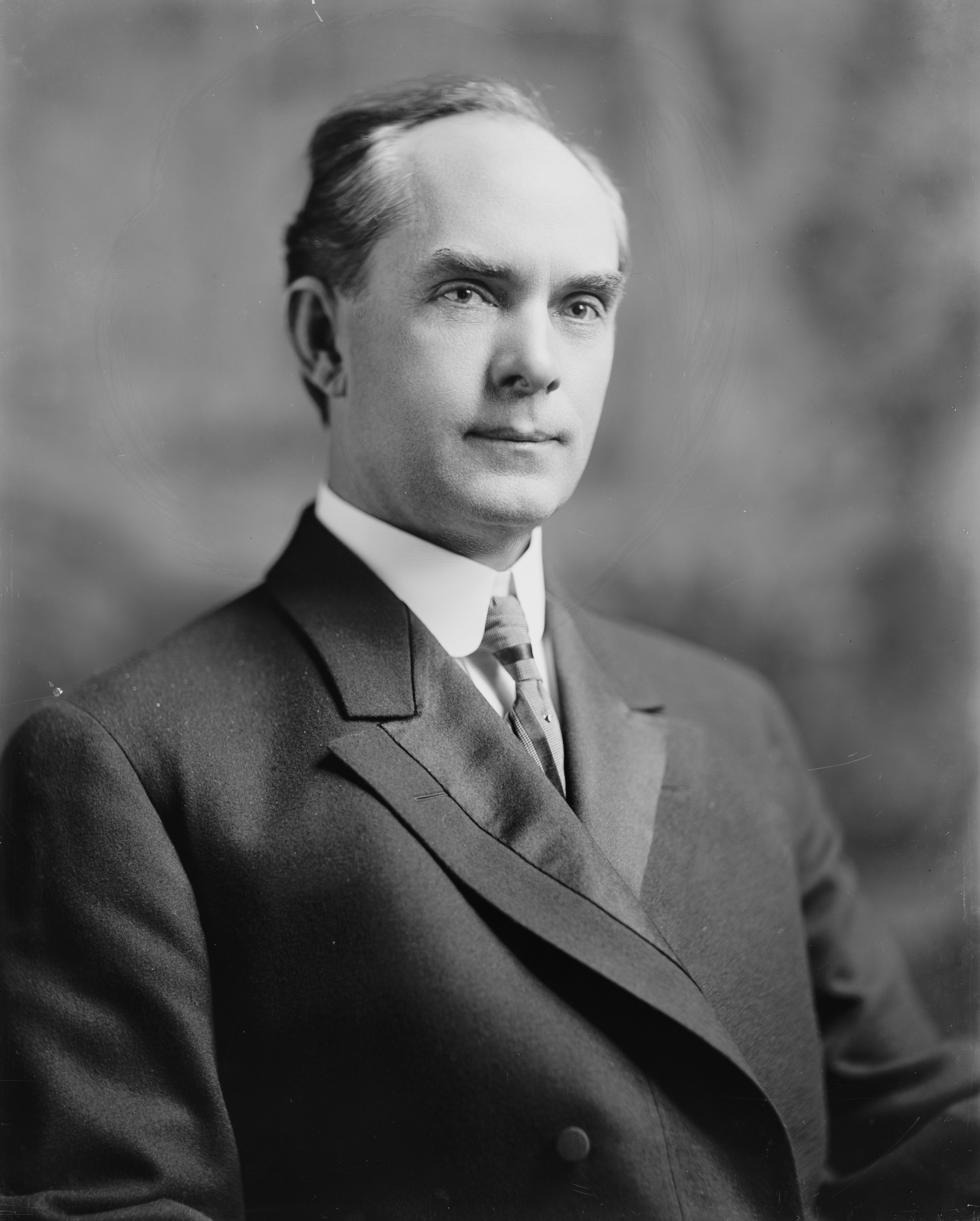

Chairman of the House Rules Committee
- In office March 4, 1911 – March 3, 1917
- Speaker: Champ Clark
- Preceded by: John Dalzell
- Succeeded by: Edward W. Pou

Chairman of the House Democratic Caucus
- In office 1905–1907
- Preceded by: James Hay
- Succeeded by: Henry D. Clayton Jr.

Member of the U.S. House of Representatives from Texas
- In office March 4, 1897 – March 3, 1917
- Preceded by: George C. Pendleton
- Succeeded by: Tom Connally
- Constituency: 7th district (1897–1903); 11th district (1903–17)

Personal details
- Born: May 12, 1864 Linden, Texas
- Died: July 9, 1931 (aged 67) Houston, Texas
- Party: Democratic

Robert Lee Henry (May 12, 1864 – July 9, 1931) was an American lawyer and politician who served ten terms as a Democratic member of the United States House of Representatives from Texas from 1897 to 1917.

== Early life ==
Robert Lee Henry was the great-great-great grandson of Patrick Henry and was born in Linden, Texas on May 12, 1864. While a child, he attended public schools and moved to Bowie County in 1878 and to McLennan County in 1895. He was graduated from Southwestern University in Georgetown, Texas in 1885. He studied law and was admitted to the bar in 1886 and practiced for a short time in Texarkana, Texas. He was graduated from the University of Texas at Austin in 1887.

== Political career ==
Henry was elected mayor of Texarkana in 1890 but resigned in 1891. He was then appointed First Assistant to the Attorney General of Texas 1891-1893 and Assistant Attorney General (1893–1896). He settled in Waco, Texas in 1895 and practiced law.

=== Congress ===
In 1896, he was elected as a Democrat to Congress and served ten consecutive terms from 1897 to 1917. From 1905 to 1907, Rep. Henry was Chairman of the House Democratic Caucus. He was also Chairman of the House Committee on Rules, serving in that capacity from 1912 to 1917. A strong supporter of Woodrow Wilson in 1912, Henry was considered a progressive Democrat.

He was not a candidate for renomination in 1916, but was an unsuccessful candidate for the Democratic nomination for United States Senator.

=== Later career ===
He engaged in the practice of law in Waco, and again was an unsuccessful candidate for the Democratic nomination for United States Senator in 1922 and 1928.

He moved to Houston, Texas in 1923 and resumed the practice of his profession.

== Death and burial ==
Robert L. Henry died in Houston, on July 9, 1931, from a self-inflicted gunshot to his head in an apparent suicide. He was buried in Rose Hill Cemetery, Texarkana, Texas.

U.S. House of Representatives
| Preceded by George C. Pendleton | Member of the U.S. House of Representatives from Texas's 7th congressional district 1897–1903 | Succeeded by Alexander W. Gregg |
| Preceded by Rudolph Kleberg | Member of the U.S. House of Representatives from Texas's 11th congressional district 1903–1917 | Succeeded by Tom Connally |
Political offices
| Preceded by Joseph Gurney Cannon; Illinois | Chairman of House Rules Committee; 1911–1917 | Succeeded by Edward W. Pou; North Carolina |
