= 21st Texas Legislature =

The 21st Texas Legislature met from January 8 to April 6, 1889, in regular session. All members of the House of Representatives and a portion of the members of the Senate were elected in the 1888 general election.

== Sessions ==
- 20th Regular session: January 8, 1889 – April 6, 1889

== Party summary ==
=== House of Representatives ===
Affiliation	Members	Note
Democratic Party	90	
Republican Party	3	
Independent	1	
Total	94	

== Officers ==
=== Senate ===
- Lieutenant Governor: Thomas Benton Wheeler, Democrat
- President pro tempore:
  - Henry D. McDonald, Democrat, Regular session
  - William H. Burges, Democrat, ad interim

=== House of Representatives ===
- Speaker of the House: Frank P. Alexander, Democrat

== Members ==
=== Senate ===
Members of the Texas Senate for the Twenty-first Texas Legislature:

- Leonard Anderson Abercrombie, Democrat
- William Allen, Unaffiliated
- William T. Armistead, Democrat
- Edwin Augustus Atlee, Democrat
- William H. Burges, Democrat
- Robert H. Burney, Democrat
- John Marshall Claiborne, Democrat
- John Walter Cranford, Democrat
- William Wallace Davis, Democrat
- Elbridge Geary Douglass, Democrat
- Scott Field, Democrat
- Louis Napoleon Frank, Democrat
- George Washington Glasscock, Jr., Unaffiliated
- John H. Harrison, Democrat
- James Melville Ingram, Democrat
- James J. Jarvis, Democrat
- William C. "Cone" Johnson, Democrat
- R.S. Kimbrough, Democrat
- Jonathan Lane, Democrat
- Ernst Gustav Maetze, Democrat
- Henry D. McDonald, Democrat
- Robert Morris, Democrat
- William Henry Pope, Democrat
- Kennan Benjamin Seale, Democrat
- Henry Taylor Sims, Democrat
- John Hall Stephens, Democrat
- M.H. Townsend, Democrat
- George W. Tyler, Democrat
- Samuel Crockett Upshaw, Democrat
- William H. Woodward, Democrat

=== House of Representatives ===
Members of the House of Representatives for the Twentieth Texas Legislature:

District	Representative	City	County	Party	Took office
1	Jerome Swinford	Orange	Orange	Democrat	January 8, 1889
2	Travis Spraggin Cochran	Colita	Polk	Democrat	January 8, 1889
3	Henry R. Ralph	Lewis Ferry	Jasper	Democrat	January 8, 1889
4	James Linn Crossland	Douglass	Nacogdoches	Democrat	January 8, 1889 (prior: 1879–1881)
5	John P. Childers	San Augustine	San Augustine	Democrat	January 8, 1889
6	Robert Teague Milner	Henderson	Rusk	Democrat	January 11, 1887
7	J. Ras Jones	Pinehill	Panola	Democrat	January 13, 1885
8	George Alexander Newton	Mount Selman	Cherokee	Democrat	January 11, 1887 (prior: 1883–1885)
9	Joseph Addison Johnson	Bethel	Anderson	Democrat	1889
10	Joseph Blakey Bishop	Athens	Henderson	Democrat	1889
11	Abram Dallas Martin	Pittsburg	Camp	Democrat	1889
12	Benjamin Green Selman	Tyler	Smith	Democrat	1889
13	William Filmore Murchison	Auga	Houston	Democrat	1889 (prior: 1895–1897)
14	Alexander J. Pope	Marshall	Harrison	Democrat	1887
15	Louis P. Wilson	Marshall	Harrison	Democrat	1889 (prior: 1883–1885)
16	Lucius Adolphus Whatley	Atlanta	Cass	Democrat	1887
17	James Dudley Carwile	Atlanta	Cass	Democrat	1889
17	Blair McGee	New Boston	Bowie	Democrat	1889
18	Albert S. Bailey	Detroit	Red River	Democrat	1889
19	William Joseph Johnson	Mount Pleasant	Titus	Democrat	1889
20	Mordecai James Hathaway	Paris	Lamar	Democrat	1889
21	William Jordan Hood	Savoy	Fannin	Democrat	1889
22	Thomas Henry Hayes	Paris	Lamar	Democrat	1889 (prior: 1874–1876)
23	George Jefferson Woodruff	Racetrack	Delta	Democrat	1889
24	John McCullough Melson	Pickton	Hopkins	Democrat	1887
25	Frank P. Alexander	Greenville	Hunt	Democrat	1885
26	Thomas Jefferson Towles	Canton	Van Zandt	Democrat	1889 (prior: 1876–1879)
27	John Haywood Tolbert	Howe	Grayson	Democrat	1887
27	Thomas Jefferson Brown	Sherman	Grayson	Democrat	1889
28	Robert Donaldson Allison	McKinney	Collin	Democrat	1889 (prior: 1876–1879, 1884–1885)
29	Joseph Warren Jagoe	Denton	Denton	Democrat	1889
30	James William Campbell	Gainesville	Cooke	Democrat	1889
31	Jesse Craft Murrell	Coesfield	Cooke	Democrat	1889
32	Alvin Clark Owsley	Denton	Denton	Democrat	1889
33	Jesse Munroe Strong	Dallas	Dallas	Democrat	1887
33	James Franklin Rowland	Richardson	Dallas	Democrat	1889
34	Isaac Duke Parker	Birdville	Tarrant	Democrat	1889
35	James W. Crayton	Fate	Rockwall	Democrat	1889
36	Andrew Jackson Brown	Alvarado	Johnson	Democrat	1889
37	William Lee Wood	Palmer	Ellis	Democrat	1887
38	James McCullough Wilson	Whitney	Hill	Democrat	1889
39	Samuel Romulus Frost	Corsicana	Navarro	Democrat	1889 (prior: 1879–1881)
40	William McGaughey	Granbury	Hood	Democrat	1885
40	Jesse Jenkins	Meridian	Bosque	Democrat	1889
41	John Alexander Hudson	Marmaduke	Wise	Democrat	1889
42	Charles Ulrich Connellee	Eastland	Eastland	Democrat	1889
43	Alfred Tolar	Abilene	Taylor	Democrat	1889
44	Rufus Burrow Lankford	Bowie	Montague	Democrat	1889
45	George Bibb Pickett	Decatur	Wise	Democrat	1889 (prior: 1874–1881)
46	Albert Stevenson	Weatherford	Parker	Democrat	1889
47	James Eldrage Dillard	Kaufman	Kaufman	Democrat	1889
48	Alexander Asberry	Calvert	Robertson	Republican	1889
49	William Ambrose Sevier Cobb	Rogers Prairie	Leon	Democrat	1889
50	Elias Mayes	Bryan	Brazos	Republican	1889 (prior: 1879–1881)
51	Henry Lee Lewis	Hearne	Robertson	Democrat	1889
52	William Leonidas Campbell	Anderson	Grimes	Democrat	1889
53	James Wesson Parker	Richmond	Fort Bend	Democrat	1887
54	James A. Breeding	Houston	Harris	Democrat	1889
54	William Wyatt Dawson	Trinity	Trinity	Democrat	1889
54	William Perry McComb	Montgomery	Montgomery	Democrat	1889
55	James Wright Cook	Mooresville	Falls	Independent	1889
56	Benjamin Josephus Roop	Temple	Bell	Democrat	1889
57	James Madison McKinney	Jones Prairie	Milam	Democrat	1885
58	James Isom Moody	Mexia	Limestone	Democrat	1889
59	George Walton White	Dew	Freestone	Democrat	1889
60	Jehu Brown	Kerens	Navarro	Democrat	1889
61	Seth Phineas Mills	Speegleville	McLennan	Democrat	1887 (prior: 1879–1881)
62	William Abraham Kincaid	Groesbeck	Limestone	Democrat	1889
63	Crocket McDonald King	Leon Junction	Coryell	Democrat	1889
64	Guy Morrison Bryan	Galveston	Galveston	Democrat	1888 (prior: 1847–1853, 1874–1876, 1879–1881)
65	Walter Gresham	Galveston	Galveston	Democrat	1887
66	Richard Henry Douglass Sorrell II	Wharton	Wharton	Democrat	1889
67	Ibzan William Middlebrook	Columbus	Colorado	Democrat	1889
68	Robert Watson Thompson	Nelsonville	Austin	Democrat	1889
69	James Franklin Overton	Hackberry	Lavaca	Democrat	1889
70	James Foster McGuire	Ledbetter	Fayette	Democrat	1887
70	Charles B. Welhausen	Flatonia	Fayette	Democrat	1889
71	Myers Felder	Chappell Hill	Washington	Democrat	1889
72	Jacob A. Fields	Giddings	Lee	Democrat	1889
73	James Madison Renick	Lexington	Lee	Democrat	1889
74	James M. Robinson	Red Rock	Bastrop	Democrat	1889 (prior: 1883–1887)
75	Felix Ezell Smith	Bluff Springs	Travis	Democrat	1889 (prior: 1874–1876, 1879–1881, 1883–1887)
75	William Robert Hamby	Austin	Travis	Democrat	1889
76	Norton Moses	Strickling	Burnet	Democrat	1889 (prior: 1876–1879)
77	Martin McFerrin Hancock	Goldthwaite	Brown	Democrat	1889
78	James Henry Faubion	Leander	Williamson	Democrat	1885
79	Simeon Whitted	Bowser Bend	San Saba	Democrat	1889
80	George Bush Stevenson	El Paso	El Paso	Democrat	1889
81	Blucher Erskine	Derby	Frio	Democrat	1889
82	Wilbur McDonald	Stockdale	Wilson	Democrat	1889
83	Thomas W. Kennedy	Rio Grande City	Starr	Democrat	1885
83	Albert Urbahn	Laredo	Webb	Democrat	1889
84	William A. Williamson	Junction City	Kimble	Democrat	1889
85	John J. Rhodes	Millett	La Salle	Democrat	1889
86	David Crawford Robinson	San Antonio	Bexar	Democrat	1887
86	William Frederick Miller	Converse	Bexar	Democrat	1889
87	Edward LeGrand Dunlap	Victoria	Victoria	Democrat	1889
87	Vachel Weldon	Cuero	DeWitt	Democrat	1889
88	Robert Byron Rentfro	Brownsville	Cameron	Republican	1889
89	William Clemens	New Braunfels	Comal	Democrat	1889 (prior: 1879–1881)
90	James William Peebles	Leesville	Gonzales	Democrat	1889
91	Jacob Lewis Ellison	Martindale	Caldwell	Democrat	1887
91	George McGehee	San Marcos	Hays	Democrat	1887
92	William Hamblen	Houston	Harris	Democrat	1889
93	Richard Butt Levy	Longview	Gregg	Democrat	1889
94	Joseph Wesley Humphrey	Point	Rains	Democrat	1889 (prior: 1885–1887)

These are multimember or flotorial districts.

== Membership Changes ==
Unknown
