= Benjamin Franklin Williams =

American politician

Texas State Representative from District 53 (Fort Bend and Waller Counties)
- In office January 13, 1885 – January 11, 1887 (died while in office)
- Preceded by: George W. Wyatt
- Succeeded by: James Wesson Parker

Texas State Representative from District 37 (Fort Bend, Waller, and Wharton Counties)
- In office January 14, 1879 – January 11, 1881
- Preceded by: Henry S. Sneed
- Succeeded by: George W. Wyatt

Texas State Representative from District 25 (Colorado and Lavaca Counties)
- In office February 9, 1870 – January 14, 1873
- Preceded by: Josiah Shaw

Personal details
- Born: 1819 Virginia, USA
- Died: 1886 (aged 66–67)
- Resting place: Kendleton, Fort Bend County, Texas
- Party: Republican
- Spouse: Caroline Williams
- Children: Thomas Williams
- Occupation: Clergyman

Benjamin Franklin Williams (1819–1886) was a Methodist minister and Republican politician who served three terms in the Texas Legislature, served as a delegate to two Texas Constitutional Conventions, and helped found the freedmen's community of Kendleton.

== Early life ==
Benjamin Franklin Williams was born into slavery in Brunswick County, Virginia in 1819, and brought to Colorado County, Texas in 1859.

== Work as a Methodist Minister ==
Following the American Civil War and news of emancipation reaching Texas, Benjamin Franklin Williams became active in Reconstruction Politics and the Methodist Episcopal Church.

Following emancipation, Williams became a Methodist minister, ultimately becoming the founding pastor of the Columbus’ Methodist Episcopal Church for freedmen. Some accounts also indicate Williams was presiding minister when Wesley Chapel Methodist Church, now Wesley Chapel United Methodist Church, in Austin, was established on March 4, 1865. Williams reportedly forbade blacks from attending his Austin church if they were not Republicans.

Williams was both admitted to the Texas Mission Conference of the Methodist Episcopal Church as a minister, “on trial,” and named the first pastor of the church that would become St. Paul's United Methodist Church of Columbus at the 1867 Annual Conference of the Texas Mission Conference of the Methodist Episcopal Church June 3–5, 1867 in Houston. He was listed as “remaining on trial,” in 1868. In 1869, Williams was “admitted in to full connection,” as a minister with the Texas Mission Conference of the Methodist Episcopal Church.

== Legislative & Constitutional Convention Service ==
In 1868, Williams was among “most active,” black delegates to the Reconstruction Constitutional Convention of 1868, after having served as vice president of the Loyal Union League. He was 48 when he was elected as a delegate.

Williams was elected to the 12th Texas Legislature by Colorado and Lavaca Counties, by Waller, Fort Bend, and Wharton to the 16th Texas Legislature; and by the counties of Waller and Fort Bend to the 19th Texas Legislature.

During the 12th Texas Legislature when Speaker Ira Hobart Evans, a former Freedmen's Bureau employee, resigned from the Speakership (at 25, he was the youngest ever elected Speaker of the Texas House) over his support for a measure to push elections back to 1872, he was denounced before the Republican Party caucus and resigned, resulting in the office of Speaker being declared vacant by the House. R.L. Moore, a white Democrat from Red River County, nominated Williams as speaker on Wednesday, May 10, 1871. Among the four candidates in the race was William H. Sincliar, a Northern Radical Republican who was incidentally instrumental in bringing professional baseball to Texas later in life. Williams came in third with ten votes behind Camp with 12 votes. Sinclair earned 42 votes.

Earlier during the 12th Session of the Texas Legislature, but under a different session call, Williams was one of a large majority of House members voting to ratify the 13th Amendment to the U.S. Constitution.

In 1885, when he represented Waller County in the 19th Texas Legislature at age 65, he was noted as, “a quiet, sensible and well informed man, and won the good will of his fellow members. Those who have known him for years speak of him in terms of commendation, and state that they never knew a better colored man. He is a minister of the Gospel and a zealous Christian Worker among his people.”

He was active in the establishment of the Freedmen's community, Kendleton.

== See also ==
- African American officeholders from the end of the Civil War until before 1900
