= Fairview Cemetery (Bastrop, Texas) =

Coordinates: 30°06′56″N 97°18′21″W

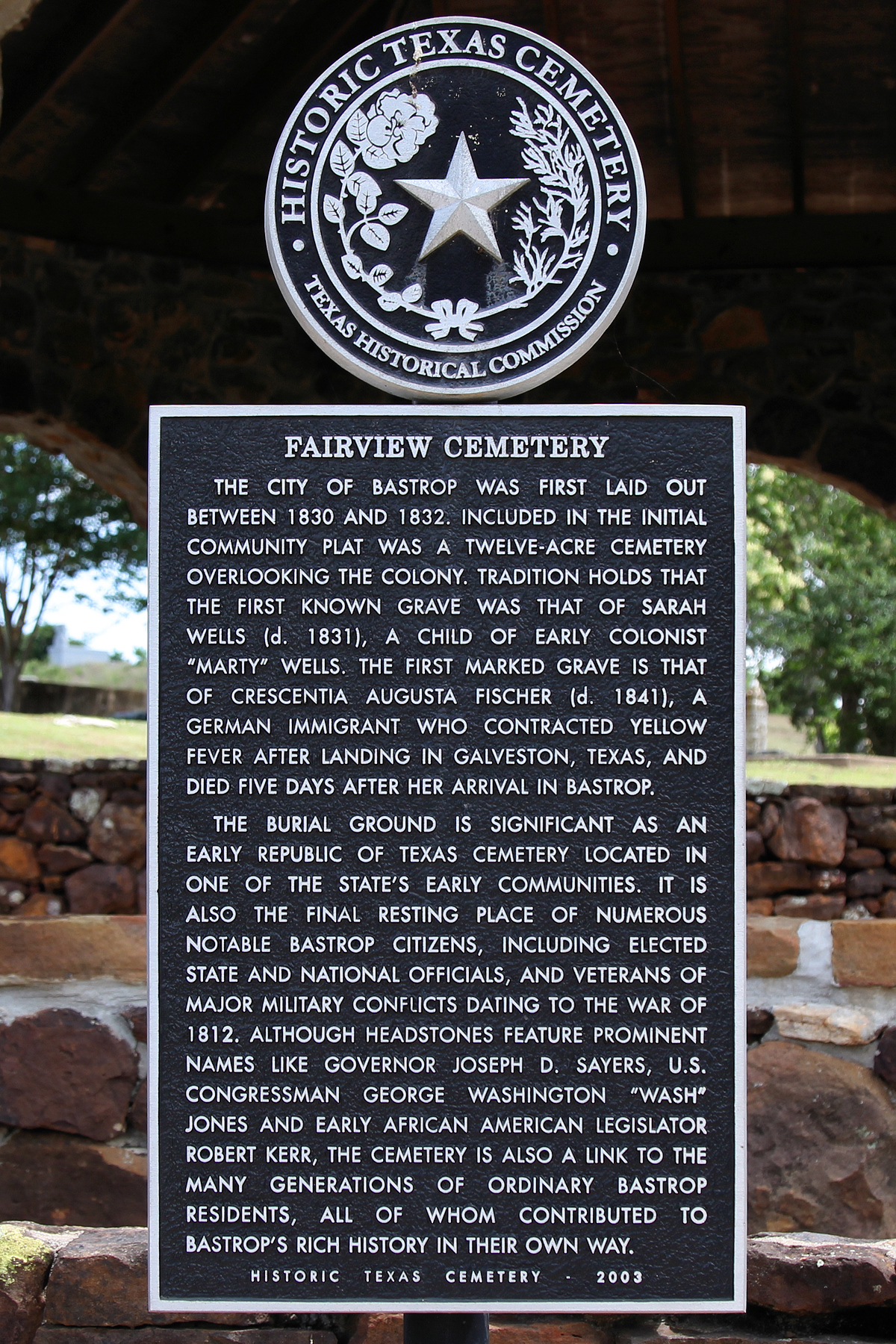
- Texas Historic Cemetery marker in Fairview Cemetery, Bastrop, Texas.
- Interactive map of Fairview Cemetery

Details
- Established: 1832
- Location: 1409 HWY 95 N, Bastrop, Texas
- Country: United States
- Owned by: City of Bastrop
- Size: 36 acres
- No. of graves: 3,500+

Fairview Cemetery is the largest, oldest and most historic burial ground in Bastrop, Texas. It is significant as an early Republic of Texas cemetery located in one of the state’s earliest communities and as the resting place of numerous notable public figures, including state and local elected officials and military veterans dating back to the War of 1812.

The site is listed as a Historic Texas Cemetery. A plaque recognizing this designation was installed in 2003. There are 10 additional markers throughout the grounds, seven erected by the Texas Historical Commission and three by Bastrop County Historical Society.

== Background ==
Plans for the town of Bastrop were laid out in 1830-1831 by empresario Stephen F. Austin’s Land Commissioner Jose Miguel de Arciniega. The plat made provisions for a public square, a municipal building, a jail, schools, a slaughterhouse and a 12-acre cemetery.

The cemetery is located on a high wooded hill northeast of the town center. The layout is unique in that graves at the top of the rise are more than 100 feet above lower ones. Initially, it was called City Cemetery and citizens were given free burial plots. Residents voted to change the name in 1884.

There are four sections: white (old section), white (new section), African American and pauper. The oldest part of the cemetery is on top of the hill. Most headstones in this area face away from the highway. This was reportedly done so that 19th century mourners could be on the lookout for raiding Native Americans.

According to local lore, the first grave was dug in 1831 for Sarah Wells, the young daughter of colonist Martin Wells. It was not marked. The first marked grave belongs to Crescentia Augusta Fischer, a German immigrant who died in 1841 of yellow fever she contracted in Galveston, Texas, five days before her arrival in Bastrop.

== Graves with historical markers ==
The graves of eight people are marked with historic plaques. Two additional markers honor groups of individuals.

- Joseph Draper Sayers (1841-1929) - state senator (1873-1875), Chairman Texas Democratic Committee (1875-1878), Chairman Democratic State Convention (1876 and 1878), Lieutenant Governor (1879-1881), U. S. Congress (1884-1898) and Texas Governor (1899-1903). State marker erected in 1978. His grave in the cemetery's northeastern section is additionally marked by a pair of prominent flagpoles, one flying the state flag, the other, a Masonic flag.
- Robert A. Kerr (1842-1912) - African American member of the Texas House of Representatives (1881-1883), Bastrop School trustee, helped establish a high school for black students. Marker erected in 2005 by Bastrop County Historical Society and Kerr Descendant Nelia Kerr Greene.
- H.N. (Man) Bell (1856-1934) - sheriff of Bastrop for 21 years, including during the fence cutting wars between cattlemen and farmers. State marker erected 1968.
- Robert Love Reding (1810-1849) - participant in the Battle of Goliad, signer of the Goliad Declaration of Independence creating the Republic of Texas. State marker erected 1936.
- Campbell Taylor (1812-1888) - participant in the Battle of San Jacinto. State marker erected 1962.
- William Dunbar (1819-1855) - member of the ill-fated Mier expedition. State marker erected 1936.
- Jesse Halderman (1801-1850) - participant in the Battle of San Jacinto. State marker erected 1962.
- John Holland Jenkins (1822-1890) - youngest soldier (13 years of age) in the San Jacinto campaign. State marker erected in 1962.
- Texas Rangers - fifteen rangers are buried in Fairview Cemetery. Stephen Austin hired ten frontiersmen as early as 1823 to pursue a band of troublesome Native Americans. In November 1835, Texas lawmakers established the special force known as the Texas Rangers. County marker erected in 2014.
- War Babies - a cluster of unmarked pauper’s graves (estimated at 16) belonging to children who perished during their fathers' World War II training at Camp Swift. Often women would accompany their husbands to the base to spend time with the men before deployment. Parents of the children interred here could not afford a proper burial. County marker erected in 2005.

== Graves of other noteworthy individuals ==
- Leah Moncure (1904-1972) - Texas’ first female registered professional engineer
- George Washington "Wash" Jones (1828-1903) - Lieutenant Governor of Texas (1866-1867), U.S. House of Representatives (1879-1883)
- Paul DeWitt Page (1868-1945) - Bastrop County judge (1904–1909), state senator (1914-1922), founder of Citizens State Bank of Bastrop (1909), one of the founders of Bastrop State Park and Camp Swift

== Cemetery expansion ==
In 2023, The City of Bastrop began a 622-plot expansion and addition of a columbarium with 480 niches. Prior to the project's start, a "ground-truthing" survey, via ground-penetrating radar (GPR), was conducted to identify unmarked graves in the west sector. In the cemetery's early years, black, brown and indigent people were often buried there without markers.

Although the identity of those buried cannot be known, the grave sites revealed via GPR were marked. Lots where no burials were identified were made available for purchase.

== Annual events ==
Bastrop County Historical Society hosts an annual guided walking tour through Fairview Cemetery. Actors, spread throughout the grounds, tell the stories of notable figures from the past and how they influenced the county's history.

Every December 13, the cemetery participates in Wreaths Across America Day, an event in which volunteers place donated wreaths on veterans' graves It is sponsored by the King's Highway Chapter of the National Society Daughters of the American Revolution, the Bastrop Chamber of Commerce and local businesses.
