= James H. Stewart =

American politician (1859–1922)

Member of the Texas House of Representatives from the 48th district
- In office January 13, 1885 – January 11, 1887
- Preceded by: Philip Edward Peers
- Succeeded by: Martin Van Buren Garner

Personal details
- Born: September 5, 1859 Caddo Parish, Louisiana, U.S.
- Died: November 24, 1922 (aged 63) Austin, Texas, U.S.
- Party: Republican
- Education: Prairie View State Normal School

James H. Stewart (September 5, 1859 – November 24, 1922) was a teacher and Republican politician. He was born in Caddo Parish, Louisiana, September 5, 1859 (1857, according to some sources). He moved to Falls County, Texas, in 1869, and then moved to Hearne, Texas, about 10 years later. He was educated at Prairie View State Normal School, later Prairie View A&M University. Stewart was one of the first teachers that graduated from the school. He was elected to the 19th Texas Legislature, representing the 48th District, Robertson County, and served one term.

Political offices
Texas House of Representatives
Preceded by Philip Edward Peers	Member of the Texas House of Representatives from District 48 (Calvert); 1885–1887	Succeeded by Martin Van Buren Garner
