= Charles Reese Gibson =

American politician and newspaperman (1842–1925)

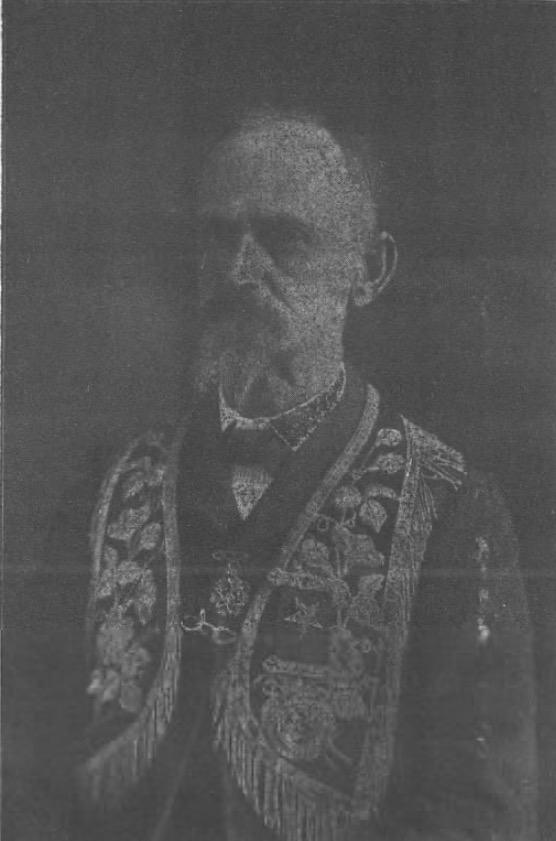

Member of the Texas House of Representatives
- In office January 14, 1879 – February 6, 1884

Speaker of the Texas House of Representatives
- In office January 9, 1883 – February 6, 1884
- Preceded by: George R. Reeves
- Succeeded by: Lafayette L. Foster

Personal details
- Born: June 21, 1842 Oakville, Alabama, US
- Died: October 22, 1925 (aged 83) Waxahachie, Texas, US
- Education: Cumberland School of Law
- Occupation: Politician, newspaperman

Military service
- Allegiance: Confederate States of America
- Branch/service: Confederate States Army
- Rank: Sergeant major
- Unit: 16th Alabama Infantry Regiment
- Battles/wars: American Civil War

Charles Reese Gibson (June 21, 1842 – October 22, 1925) was an American politician and newspaperman. A Democrat, he was Speaker of the Texas House of Representatives. He published several newspapers and later became a columnist.

== Early life and military service ==
Gibson was born on June 21, 1842, near Oakville, Alabama, the son of judge Charles Gibson and Clarissa (née McDowell) Gibson. He was educated at the Speake School near Oakville, after which he was further educated by the "Immortal Freemen", an organization active between Moulton and Somerville.

Gibson attended the Cumberland School of Law, though temporarily dropped out to join the Confederate States Army and fight in the American Civil War. He was originally a private in the 16th Alabama Infantry Regiment, rising to the rank of sergeant major. The regiment surrendered in spring 1865, after which he began practicing law in Moulton.

== Career ==
On January 1, 1867, Gibson moved to Waxahachie, Texas. From 1869 to 1873, he was the clerk of Ellis County. In 1874, Gibson founded his first newspaper, the Ellis County News. Its motto was "Uphold the Right...Denounce the Wrong". He later sold the paper, then founded the Waxahachie Enterprise, publishing its first issue in January 1876. He sold the Enterprise after being elected to the Texas House of Representatives.

A Democrat, Gibson was a member of the State House from January 14, 1879, to February 6, 1884. In his last term, he served as Speaker of the House. After serving in the House, in 1881, he became editor of the Waxahachie Mirror. Beginning in 1900, he became a columnist, being published in the Waxahachie Daily Light and the Weekly Enterprise for writings about his "squibs". He was a popular columnist in the area.

== Personal life and death ==
Gibson was a member of the Independent Order of Odd Fellows. He was a canton, the organization's highest rank. He helped establish 15 lodges, as well as the I.O.O.F. Widows' and Orphans' Home, in Corsica. He also published its Texas newspaper, the Texas Odd Fellow.

In 1867, Gibson married Sallie N. Ellis; they had four children together, with her dying on April 20, 1877. He then married Emma Jane Driscoll, having two children together. He lived in Houston for part of the 1890s, though returned to Waxahachie. He died on October 22, 1925, aged 83, in Waxahachie, and was buried at Waxahachie City Cemetery.
