= Nathan H. Haller =

American politician from Texas (1845–1917)

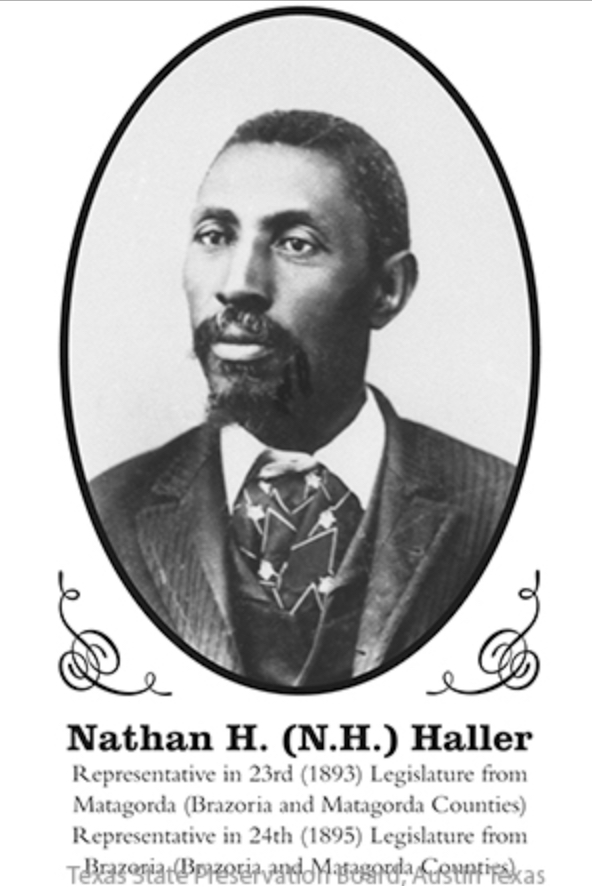

Member of the Texas House of Representatives from the 40th district
- In office January 10, 1893 – January 12, 1897
- Preceded by: R. C. Duff

Personal details
- Born: July 8, 1845
- Died: February 27, 1917 (aged 71) Houston, Texas, U.S.
- Party: Republican
- Spouse: Paralee Jordan
- Children: 2

Nathan H. Haller (July 8, 1845 – February 27, 1917) was a politician from Texas. Enslaved before the American Civil War, he was elected member to the Texas House of Representatives in 1892 and re-elected to a second term. He was one of 52 African Americans to serve the Texas Legislature during the 19th century.

He served two terms from 1893 until 1897, the second after winning a court fight over the election. He was one of the last two African Americans (Robert Lloyd Smith was the other) to hold state office in Texas before 1966.

He had worked as a free farmer, a blacksmith and also a wagon driver.

He married Paralee Jordan of Huntsville and two sons, Stonewall Jackson Haller and James Haller.

Nathan Haller died on February 27, 1917, in Houston, Texas.

== See also ==
- African American officeholders from the end of the Civil War until before 1900
