= Sheltonville, Georgia =

Unincorporated community in Georgia, U.S.

Coordinates: 34°03′23″N 84°07′54″W

Sheltonville or Shake Rag is an unincorporated community in Forsyth and Fulton counties, in the U.S. state of Georgia. Some of the community was formerly located in Milton County until the county was dissolved in 1931, during the Great Depression.

== History ==
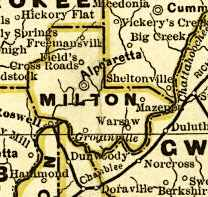
An 1883 map of Georgia with Sheltonville located in southeastern Forsyth County

Variant names are "Shakerag" and "Sheltonville". A post office called Sheltonville was established in 1848, and remained in operation until 1907. The name "Shake Rag" refers to a cloth held out as a signal for example to stop a train.
