= John Marks Moore =

American attorney and politician

Secretary of State of Texas
- In office January 22, 1887 – January 22, 1891
- Governor: L. S. Ross
- Preceded by: Joseph Wilson Baines
- Succeeded by: George W. Smith

Member of the Texas House of Representatives from the 42nd district
- In office January 9, 1883 – January 13, 1885
- Preceded by: Lafayette L. Foster
- Succeeded by: Joseph T. Webb

Personal details
- Born: January 23, 1853 Houston County, Texas, U.S.
- Died: September 28, 1902 (aged 49) Edna, Texas, U.S.
- Burial place: City Cemetery, Austin, Texas, U.S.
- Education: Washington and Lee University; Cumberland University Law School
- Political party: Democratic
- Spouse: Estelle Grace (m. 1884)
- Children: 3; including George
- Father: George F. Moore

John Marks Moore (January 23, 1853 – September 28, 1902) was an American attorney, Democratic politician from Texas, a member of the Texas House of Representatives, and the Secretary of State of Texas during the term of Lawrence Sullivan Ross.

== Early life ==
John Marks Moore was the son of George Fleming Moore, who was a chief justice of the Supreme Court of Texas. His uncle was John Marks Davenport Moore (March 21, 1811 - August 20, 1892), a member of the Texas House of Representatives between 1875 and 1876. John Marks Moore attended Washington and Lee University in Lexington, Virginia, and then attended law school at Cumberland University Law School in Lebanon, Tennessee.

== Career in public service ==
Moore's public life began when he was elected district attorney of the Twelfth Judicial District. He was elected to the Texas House of Representatives in 1883 and held the position until 1885. Moore was the Secretary of State of Texas during Ross's term as the 19th Governor of Texas, from 1887 to 1891.

== Death and legacy ==
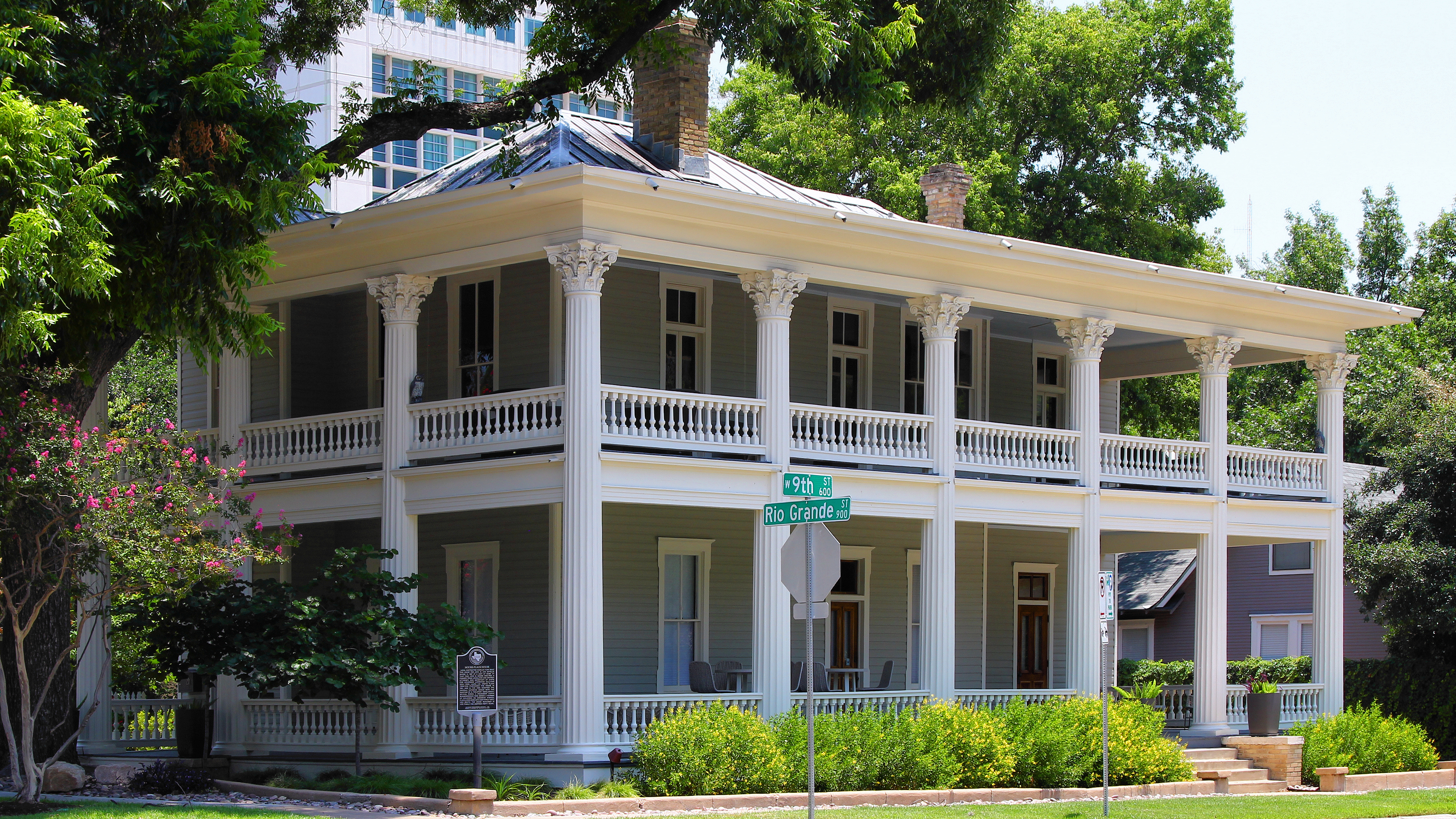
The Moore-Flack House in Austin, Texas.

Moore died on September 28, 1902, at his home in Edna, Texas. He had three children, including George Fleming Moore. Moore financed the building of the Moore-Flack House in Austin, a historic building built in 1887, during his term as Secretary of State. He sold the property in 1901 to Laura A. E. (née Metz) Flack. The house is also a Recorded Texas Historic Landmark, which it was designated in 1984.

Political offices
Preceded by Joseph Wilson Baines	Secretary of State of Texas; 1887–1891	Succeeded by George W. Smith
Texas House of Representatives
Preceded by Lafayette L. Foster (Redistricted)	Member of the Texas House of Representatives from District 42 (Cisco); 1883–1885	Succeeded by Joseph T. Webb
