= Bransford, Texas =

- Historical unincorporated community
- Location within Texas Location within the United States
- Coordinates: 32°53′59″N 97°10′06″W
- Country: United States
- State: Texas
- County: Tarrant
- Elevation: 679 ft (207 m)
- Time zone: UTC-6 (Central (CST))
  - Summer (DST): UTC-5 (CDT)
- GNIS feature ID: 1378047

Bransford was an unincorporated community, in Tarrant County, located in the U.S. state of Texas. It was since renamed Colleyville, for Dr. Lilburn Howard Colley, who came to the area in 1880.
