= Benjamin Dudley Tarlton =

American politician (1849–1919)

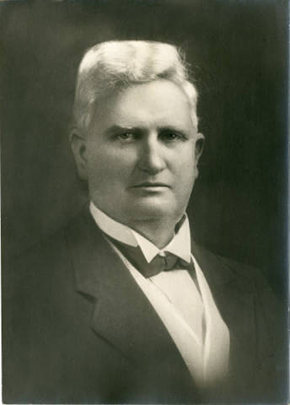

Chief Justice of the Court of Civil Appeals for the Second Supreme Judicial District of Texas
- In office 1892–1898

Benjamin Dudley Tarlton (October 18, 1849 – September 22, 1919) was an American lawyer, legislator, judge, and professor. Tarlton practiced law in Texas from 1899 to 1904. He served in the seventeenth and nineteenth Texas Legislatures as member of the Texas House of Representatives. Texas Governor Jim Hogg appointed him to the Commission of Appeals in 1891. In 1892, Tarlton was elected Chief Justice of the Court of Civil Appeals at Fort Worth. From 1904 to 1919, he was a distinguished Professor of Law at University of Texas School of Law. The University of Texas School of Law Tarlton Law Library was named in his honor in 1951. His granddaughter, Frances Tarlton Farenthold, was a member of the Texas House of Representatives and twice ran for the Democratic nomination for Governor of Texas.

== Additional sources ==
- Brian Hart, "TARLTON, BENJAMIN DUDLEY," Handbook of Texas Online (http://www.tshaonline.org/handbook/online/articles/fta09), accessed August 10, 2014. Uploaded on June 15, 2010. Published by the Texas State Historical Association.
