= Lafayette L. Foster =

American journalist and politician

L. L. Foster
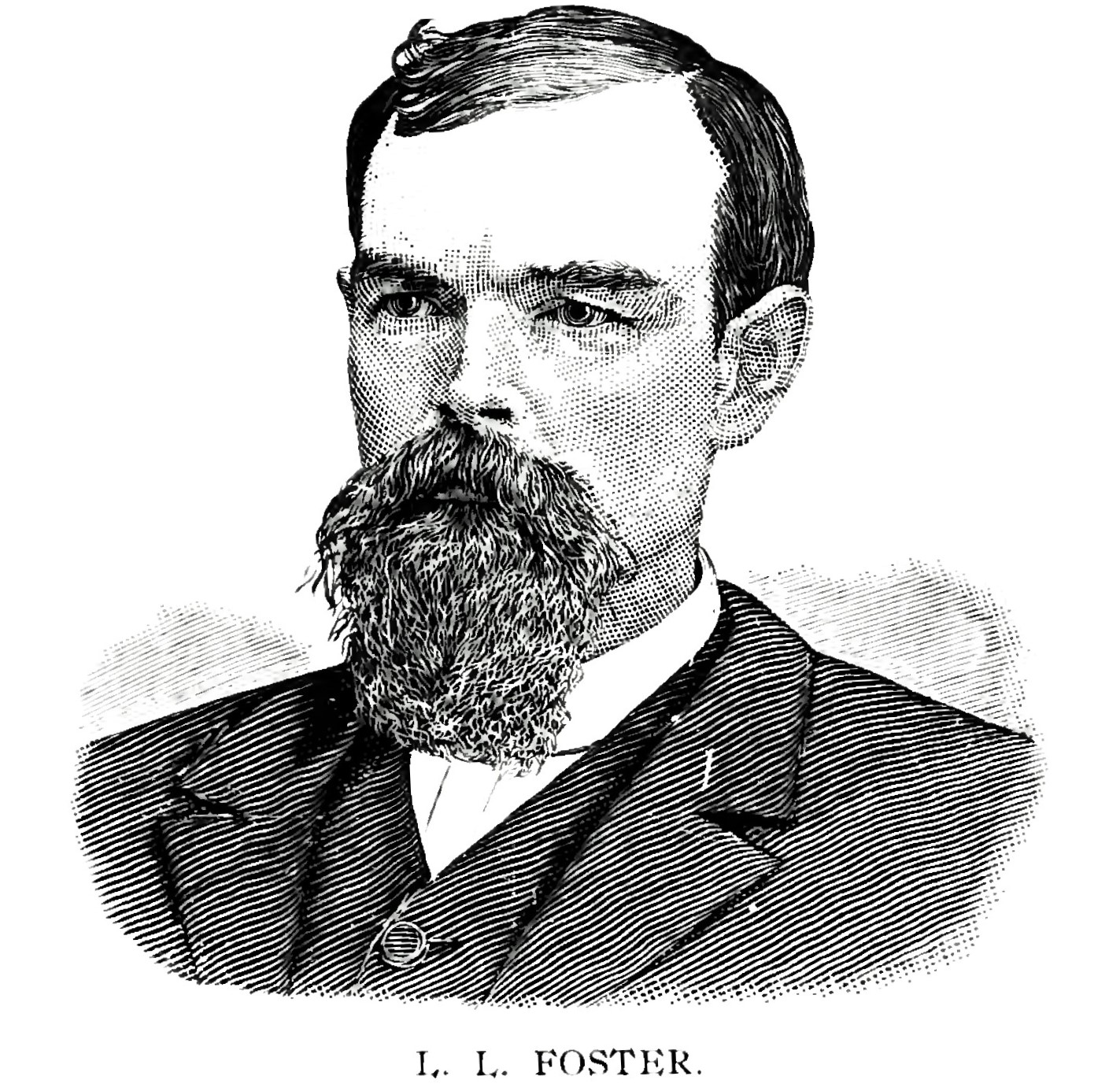

5th President of the Agricultural and Mechanical College of Texas
- In office July 1, 1898 – December 2, 1901
- Preceded by: Roger Haddock Whitlock (Acting)
- Succeeded by: Roger Haddock Whitlock (Acting)

Railroad Commissioner of Texas
- In office May 5, 1891 – April 29, 1895
- Appointed by: Jim Hogg
- Preceded by: Office established
- Succeeded by: N. A. Stedman

Commissioner of the Department of Agriculture, Insurance, Statistics, and History
- In office January 20, 1887 – May 4, 1891
- Governor: L. S. Ross; Jim Hogg
- Preceded by: Hamilton P. Bee
- Succeeded by: John E. Hollingsworth

28th Speaker of the Texas House of Representatives
- In office January 13, 1885 – January 11, 1887
- Preceded by: Charles Reese Gibson
- Succeeded by: George Cassety Pendleton

Member of the Texas House of Representatives
- In office January 9, 1883 – January 11, 1887
- Preceded by: Robert A. Kerr
- Succeeded by: Albert Collins Prendergast
- Constituency: 62nd district
- In office January 11, 1881 – January 9, 1883
- Preceded by: James Petty Brown
- Succeeded by: John Marks Moore (Redistricting)
- Constituency: 42nd district

Personal details
- Born: Lafayette Lumpkin Foster; November 27, 1851 Sheltonville, Georgia, U.S.
- Died: December 2, 1901 (aged 50) Dallas, Texas, U.S.
- Burial place: College Station, Texas, U.S. 30.60192°N 96.36829°W
- Education: Waco University
- Political party: Democratic
- Spouse: Laura Pender (m. 1875)
- Children: 7

Lafayette Lumpkin Foster (November 27, 1851 – December 2, 1901) was an American journalist and politician. A bureaucrat that held various positions in the state government of Texas, Foster was a member of the boards of both Baylor University and the Agricultural and Mechanical College of Texas, later becoming president of the A&M College of Texas, now known as Texas A&M University, from 1898 to his death three years later.

A strong believer in organization and progress, he played instrumental roles in the merger of two large Texas Baptist conventions, and Baylor University's move to Waco. He helped organize the first "Farmers' Camp Meeting" in 1898, which would turn into the Texas Farmers Congress and be held annually at the A&M College until 1915. Foster was the youngest speaker of the Texas House of Representatives at the time of his election to the office at the age of 33. He preferred to be known as L. L. Foster and few people actually knew his full name.

== Early life ==
Lafayette Lumpkin Foster was born on November 27, 1851, in Sheltonville, Georgia, to Joseph Douglas Foster (February 22, 1829 - July 17, 1877), a veteran of both the Mexican–American War and the American Civil War, and Millie Malinda Foster (née Estes; September 15, 1833 – May 20, 1861) from Gwinnett County, Georgia. He was the first-born of five children. Sheltonville was located near the town of Cumming, in Forsyth County. During the Civil War, and after his mother's death, Foster and his siblings lived with his grandmother, Mary Foster. His father Joseph sided with the Confederacy, eventually becoming Captain in the 22nd Georgia Infantry Regiment of the confederate army, and was captured during the Battle of Gettysburg. After the battle he was held at the POW camp at Johnson's Island until near the end of the war. Lafayette Foster moved to Limestone County, Texas, penniless and at the age of 18. He initially lived in the community of Horn Hill and later moved to Springfield. He labored as a brick mason and cotton picker before saving enough money to afford to attend Waco University. At Waco, Foster specialized his studies in Mathematics and Latin, but did not graduate. He began attending the university in 1872 and in 1873 he listed the town of Groesbeck as his home. He attended the university before it merged with Baylor University, then located in Independence, in 1886. Foster was one of the leaders in the negotiation for the merger of the two universities into Baylor University in Waco.

== Journalism career ==
Foster moved to Groesbeck in November 1873, starting a newspaper, the Limestone New-Era, on November 19, 1876. He was the papers editor, proprietor, and publisher. He soon after entered politics, leaving the paper in 1890, when it began to consume too much of his time. He was a founding member and the seventh president of the Texas Press Association in Austin from 1886 to 1887. During his term as president of the press association, Foster and Charles E. Gilbert purchased the Dallas Herald on June 7, 1886. Foster sold his interest in the paper to Gilbert later the same year.

== Political career ==
He ran for the Texas House of Representatives for the 42nd district in 1880, winning the election and was inaugurated in 1881. He later on went to represent the 62nd district after redistricting. In 1883, he was the chair of the House Committee on Public Printing. He was the speaker of the Texas House of Representatives from 1885 to 1887. An 1885 biography of Foster notes

From obscurity and poverty he struggled up the rugged heights to distinction and a place in the hearts of his colleagues in the legislature, his constituents and the people of the Lone Star State. By industry, economy and firmness of purpose, he has gained a competency; built himself a home, and properly utilized and developed the intellect which God has given him. In England and other foreign countries where the possession of wealth and rank is almost absolutely necessary for the rapid rise of young men to political distinction, many poor young men of genius give up the struggle in despair, and turn aside into the sterile and beaten paths of life and never accomplish the destinies for which the Architect of nature intended them; but, in this land of Democratic liberty the talents of men are appreciated, the road that leads to honor is well defined and open to all men mentally able to climb its steep ascent. The lives of such men as the distinguished Speaker of the Nineteenth Legislature, contain a moral that the most ignorant man may read and one that should stimulate the young men of Texas, who thirst for the laurels that crown the brow of successful merit, to earnest and untiring effort. [sic]

He was the youngest-ever to hold the position at the time. He was appointed as the Commissioner of Agriculture, Insurance, Statistics and History by Governor Lawrence Sullivan Ross and was reappointed to the position by Governor Jim Hogg on January 22, 1891. As commissioner, Foster organized the First Annual Report of the Agricultural Bureau of the Department of Agriculture, Insurance, Statistics, and History. He also worked with Hogg to harry illegally operating insurance companies out of Texas. Hogg then appointed Foster, known for his attention to detail and large store of knowledge about railroad affairs, as a member of the first Railroad Commission of Texas, which was established to regulate shipping rates and practices, later the same year. He was the railroad commissioner until 1895, when he became the vice president and general manager of the Velasco Terminal Railway. Foster later resigned from this position in 1898 to work for the successful gubernatorial campaign of Joseph D. Sayers, as the Chairman of the Sayers Central Campaign Committee. In the summer of 1898, he was appointed as the President of the Agricultural and Mechanical College of Texas by the Board of Directors of the college. He served in this position for three years, until his death in 1901.

== Baptist and Baylor University activities ==
Foster became an unordained minister at the First Baptist Church, which he helped found in Groesbeck in 1873, the same year he moved to town. He was sent as a delegate from Groesbeck to the twenty-seventh Annual Session of the Baptist State Convention of Texas in Galveston, October 3 to October 6, 1874. Foster was appointed president of the Baptist General Association of Texas convention on July 24, 1885. He was also present during the meeting between the "board of trustees of Waco University, Baylor University and Baylor Female College with the committees appointed by the Texas Baptist State Convention and the Baptist General Association of Texas" at the "Baptist House of Worship, Temple, on December 9, 1885." At this meeting, he was also appointed "to present a basis for the consolidation of the schools." This committee decided

1. That Waco University and Baylor Universities be consolidated.
2. The name of the school would be Baylor University.
3. That Baylor University be located in Waco, and we further agree that the female department be continued there now as it exists…

Foster was the final president of the General Association of Texas before it merged into the Baptist General Convention in 1886. He was president of the Baptist General Convention of Texas in 1890. He was listed as the secretary from Austin for the Baptist General Convention of Texas of 1894. Foster was a member of the Board of Trustees of Baylor University between 1890 and 1896.

== President of the A&M College of Texas ==
Foster helped plan the college and was an ex officio member of the Board of Directors from 1887 to 1889. As president, he was an early advocate for the admission of women into the college. While president, Foster permitted the first female students to enroll. Twin sisters Mary and Sophie Hutson, and Emma Watkins Fountain, the daughters of professors, were the first females to enroll at the college nearly half a century before it became coeducational. The 1903 Long Horn, a student year book published by the seniors of A&M, dedicated the first edition to Foster. Foster Hall, a building located at the A&M College from 1899 to 1951, and L. L. Foster Hall, a men's dormitory at Prairie View A&M University built in 1909 and demolished in 1980, were named in his honor.

== Personal life ==
Foster was a member of the Masonic fraternity from 1873 until his death.

Foster wed Laura Lucretia Pender (December 11, 1856 – January 27, 1929) originally of Orange, Texas, on January 2, 1875, and they had five sons and two daughters.

In 1887, he was described as standing "about six feet tall, straight and slight in person, with a finely chisled face, the lower part of which is hidden by a thick, black beard, worn at moderate length. He has a commanding presence and address, and is graceful and dignified in manner." Foster became an elected member of the American Association for the Advancement of Science in 1901.

== Death ==
He died on December 2, 1901, at the St. George Hotel in Dallas, where he died of pneumonia. His son Joseph Lumpkin Foster was with him at the time.

He was initially buried on the grounds of Texas A&M, the only president to have been so, where his funeral was attended by Governor Sayers and Oscar H. Cooper, among others. Foster was originally interred in the area between Duncan Dining Hall and Dorm 9. In 1939, his grave was moved to the historic Texas A&M Cemetery that was once located on the corner of Luther Street and Marion Pugh Drive in order to make room for the Duncan Dining Hall. In 2010, it was reported that Texas A&M was in the process of getting approval from the Texas Historical Commission to move his remains for a second time. His grave has since been relocated to the newer Memorial Cemetery in College Station.

== Legacy ==
A plaque about Foster was erected near the courthouse in Groesbeck, Texas, by the Texas State Historical Survey Committee in 1966, dedicated to his service as a member of the First Railroad Commission of Texas. Two streets, Foster Avenue and Foster Lane, in College Station, Texas, are named for Foster.

== Quotes ==
- "If there were no moderate dram drinkers, there would be no drunkards."
- "My father was a confederate soldier, having served in Lee's army throughout the entire Civil War: first as a lieutenant and then as captain of a company in the Twenty-second Georgia regiment, and though a mere boy at the time, having no proper appreciation of the issues involved in that great struggle, my sympathies have ever since so strongly leaned towards the ex-confederate soldier, that I have on occasion, other things being equal, thrown my influence in his favor, and on this ground I support Mr. Sayers for governor."

== Electoral history ==
=== 1880 election ===
Texas's 42nd House of Representatives district election, 1880 primary Source:
Party	Candidate	Votes	%
Democratic	Lafayette Lumpkin Foster	524	63.52
Democratic	Marion McDonald Gibson	301	36.48
Total votes		825	100

=== Speaker of the Texas House of Representatives ===
January 13, 1885 election for speaker (1st through 3rd ballots)
Party	Candidate (district)	1st ballot		2nd ballot		3rd ballot	
Party	Candidate (district)	Votes	%	Votes	%	Votes	%
Democratic	Lafayette Lumpkin Foster (62nd)	45	42.86%	49	47.12%	56	53.33%
Democratic	William Felton Upton (70th)	36	34.28%	41	39.42%	49	46.67%
Democratic	Andrew Todd McKinney (54th)	24	22.86%	14	13.46%	—N/a	
Total votes		105	100%	104	100%	105	100%
Votes needed to win		53	>50%	52	>50%	53	>50%

== Works ==
- Foster, L. L., ed. (1889). First Annual Report of the Agricultural Bureau of the Department of Agriculture, Insurance, Statistics, and History, 1887–1888. Austin: State Printing Office – via Google Books.
- Foster, L. L., ed. (1890). Second Annual Report of the Agricultural Bureau of the Department of Agriculture, Insurance, Statistics, and History, 1888–1889. Austin: State Printing Office – via Google Books.
- Foster, L. L. (October 21, 2001). Rozek, Barbara J. (ed.). Forgotten Texas Census: First Annual Report of the Agricultural Bureau of the Department of Agriculture, Insurance, Statistics, and History, 1887-88. Austin: Texas State Historical Association. ISBN 0876111835. LCCN 2001-37032. OCLC 47023638 – via University of North Texas Libraries.

== Bibliography ==
- Loughery, E. H. (1885). "Biographical Sketches of Members of the 19th Legislature". Personnel of the Texas State Government for 1885; Containing Biographical Sketches of the Governor, Heads of Departments and Members and Officers of the 19th Legislature. Austin, Texas: J. M. Snyder, Book and Job Printer.
- Daniell, Lewis E. (1887). Personnel of the Texas State Government with Sketches of Distinguished Texans, Embracing the Executive Staff, Heads of Departments, United States Senators and Representatives, Members of the XXth legislature. Austin: Press of the City Printing Company. LCCN 19016834.
- Walker, James Lafayette; Lumpkin, Calvin Patton (1897). History of the Waco Baptist Association of Texas. Waco, Texas: Byrne Hill Printing House.
- Raines, Caldwell Walton (1902). Year Book for Texas, 1901. Austin: Gammel Book Company.
- Carroll, J. M. (2009). Cranfill, J. B. (ed.). A History of Texas Baptists: Comprising a Detailed Account of Their Progress and Their Achievements. Dallas: Baptist Standard Publishing Company (published 1923). ISBN 9781725284371.

Academic offices
Preceded by Roger Haddock Whitlock (Acting)	President of the Agricultural and Mechanical College of Texas; 1898–1901	Succeeded by Roger Haddock Whitlock (Acting)
Political offices
Preceded by Office Established	Railroad Commissioner of Texas; 1891–1895	Succeeded by Nathan Alexander Stedman
Preceded by Hamilton Prioleau Bee	Commissioner of Agriculture, Insurance, Statistics and History; 1887–1891	Succeeded by John Elston Hollingsworth
Texas House of Representatives
Preceded by Charles Reese Gibson	Speaker of the Texas House of Representatives; 1885–1887	Succeeded by George Cassety Pendleton
Preceded by Robert A. Kerr	Member of the Texas House of Representatives from District 62 (Groesbeeck); 1883–1887	Succeeded by Albert Collins Prendergast
Preceded by James Petty Brown	Member of the Texas House of Representatives from District 42 (Groesbeeck); 1881–1883	Succeeded by John Marks Moore (Redistricting)
