= 24th Texas Legislature =

The 24th Texas Legislature met from January 8, 1895, to April 30, 1895, and again in a special called session from October 1, 1895, to October 7, 1895.
