= Texas's 6th House of Representatives district =

American legislative district

Texas's 6th State House of Representatives district
Representative
| Daniel Alders; R–Tyler |
- Demographics: 56.2% White; 19.1% Black; 20.3% Hispanic; 2.6% Asian; 1.8% Other
- Population (2020) • Voting age: 189,005; 144,223

District 6 is a district in the Texas House of Representatives. It was created in the 3rd legislature (1849–1851).

The district has been represented by Republican Daniel Alders since 2025. It was previously held by Matt Schaefer since January 8, 2013, upon his initial election to the Texas House.

As a result of redistricting after the 2020 Federal census, from the 2022 elections the district encompasses the southern half of Smith County. Tyler is the most populous city in the district.

== List of representatives ==
| Leg. | Representative | Party | Term start | Term end | Counties represented |
|---|---|---|---|---|---|
| 3rd | Samuel Bogart | Unknown | November 5, 1849 | November 3, 1851 | Collin, Grayson |
| 4th | William N. Hardeman | Unknown | November 3, 1851 | November 7, 1853 | Angelina, Nacogdoches |
| 5th | Alexander Berry | Unknown | November 7, 1853 | November 5, 1855 | Collin |
| 6th | Francis M. Dougherty | Unknown | November 5, 1855 | November 2, 1857 | Collin |
| 7th | James P. Scott | Unknown | November 2, 1857 | March 13, 1858 | Collin |
| 7th | Vacant | N/A | March 13, 1858 | August 2, 1858 | Collin |
| 7th | Jacob Baccus | Unknown | August 2, 1858 | November 7, 1859 | Collin |
| 8th | Samuel Bogart | Unknown | November 7, 1859 | February 9, 1861 | Collin |
| 8th | Vacant | N/A | February 9, 1861 | November 2, 1861 | Collin |
| 9th | Franklin F. Roberts | Unknown | November 4, 1861 | November 2, 1863 | Shelby |
| 10th | James M. Ramsey | Unknown | November 2, 1863 | August 6, 1866 | Shelby |
| 11th | Daniel M. Short | Unknown | August 8, 1866 | February 7, 1870 | Shelby |
| 12th | Isaiah N. Browning | Republican | Elected but never sworn | | Smith, Upshur |
| 12th | William C. Pierson | Republican | February 8, 1870 | January 14, 1873 | Smith, Upshur |
| 12th | George H. Slaughter | Republican | February 8, 1870 | January 14, 1873 | Smith, Upshur |
| 12th | McDonald Lorance | Republican | January 10, 1871 | January 14, 1873 | Smith, Upshur |
| 13th | C. C. Galloway | Democratic | January 14, 1873 | January 13, 1874 | Smith, Upshur |
| 13th | Robert K. Gaston | Democratic | January 14, 1873 | January 13, 1874 | Smith, Upshur |
| 13th | Edward Sharp | Democratic | January 14, 1873 | January 17, 1873 | Smith, Upshur |
| 13th 14th | Bluford W. Brown | Democratic | January 17, 1873 | April 18, 1876 | Smith, Upshur |
| 14th | James B. Henderson | Democratic | January 13, 1874 | April 18, 1876 | Smith, Upshur |
| 14th | George W. Matthews | Democratic | January 13, 1874 | April 18, 1876 | Smith, Upshur |
| 15th | Washington L. Denman | Democratic | April 18, 1876 | January 14, 1879 | Angelina, Nacogdoches |
| 16th | James L. Crossland | Democratic | January 14, 1879 | January 11, 1881 | Angelina, Nacogdoches |
| 17th | Washington L. Denman | Democratic | January 11, 1881 | January 9, 1883 | Angelina, Nacogdoches |
| 18th | Caleb J. Garrison | Democratic | January 9, 1883 | January 13, 1885 | Rusk |
| 19th | William Beard | Democratic | January 13, 1885 | January 11, 1887 | Rusk |
| 20th | Robert T. Milner | Democratic | January 11, 1887 | January 8, 1889 | Rusk |
| 21st | Robert T. Milner | Democratic | January 8, 1889 | January 13, 1891 | Rusk |
| 22nd | Robert T. Milner | Democratic | January 13, 1891 | January 10, 1893 | Rusk |
| 23rd | E. W. Fagan | Democratic | January 10, 1893 | January 8, 1895 | Lamar |
| 23rd 24th | Travis C. Henderson | Democratic | January 10, 1893; January 8, 1895 | January 8, 1895; January 12, 1897 | Lamar |
| 24th 25th | William F. Moore | Democratic | January 8, 1895; January 12, 1897 | January 12, 1897; January 10, 1899 | Lamar |
| 25th | John W. Love Sr. | Democratic | January 12, 1897 | January 10, 1899 | Lamar |
| 26th | Travis C. Henderson | Democratic | January 10, 1899 | January 8, 1901 | Lamar |
| 26th | Elvis A. Calvin | Democratic | January 10, 1899 | January 8, 1901 | Lamar |
| 27th | Travis C. Henderson | Democratic | January 8, 1901 | January 13, 1903 | Lamar |
| 27th | Elvis A. Calvin | Democratic | January 8, 1901 | January 13, 1903 | Lamar |
| 28th | Joseph A. Worsham | Democratic | January 13, 1903 | January 10, 1905 | Hopkins |
| 29th | Robert E. Bertram | Democratic | January 10, 1905 | January 8, 1907 | Hopkins |
| 30th | Walter A. Nelson | Democratic | January 8, 1907 | January 12, 1909 | Hopkins |
| 31st | Walter A. Nelson | Democratic | January 12, 1909 | January 10, 1911 | Hopkins |
| 32nd | T. J. Russell | Democratic | January 10, 1911 | January 14, 1913 | Hopkins |
| 33rd | Clifford L. Stone | Democratic | January 14, 1913 | January 12, 1915 | Rusk |
| 34th | George W. Burton | Democratic | January 12, 1915 | January 9, 1917 | Rusk |
| 35th | George W. Burton | Democratic | January 9, 1917 | January 14, 1919 | Rusk |
| 36th | George W. Burton | Democratic | January 14, 1919 | January 11, 1921 | Rusk |
| 37th | Lumpkin Webb | Democratic | January 11, 1921 | March 31, 1922 | Rusk |
| 37th | Vaccant | N/A | March 31, 1922 | May 6, 1922 | Rusk |
| 37th | Gary Bonner Sanford | Democratic | May 6, 1922 | January 9, 1923 | Rusk |
| 38th | Cary McClure Abney | Democratic | January 9, 1923 | January 13, 1925 | Harrison |
| 39th | Wade Pope Lane | Democratic | January 13, 1925 | January 11, 1927 | Harrison |
| 40th | Merritt Hamilton Gibson | Democratic | January 11, 1927 | January 8, 1929 | Harrison |
| 41st | Finis Homer Prendergast | Democratic | January 8, 1929 | January 13, 1931 | Harrison |
| 42nd | Walter Carroll Holloway | Democratic | January 13, 1931 | January 10, 1933 | Gregg |
| 43rd | Walter Carroll Holloway | Democratic | January 10, 1933 | January 8, 1935 | Gregg |
| 44th | Merritt Hamilton Gibson | Democratic | January 8, 1935 | January 12, 1937 | Gregg |
| 45th | Merritt Hamilton Gibson | Democratic | January 12, 1937 | January 10, 1939 | Gregg |
| 46th | Clayton Loftis Bray | Democratic | January 10, 1939 | January 14, 1941 | Gregg |
| 47th | Clayton Loftis Bray | Democratic | January 14, 1941 | January 12, 1943 | Gregg |
| 48th | William Earl Sharp | Democratic | January 12, 1943 | February 6, 1943 | Gregg |
| 48th | Vacant | N/A | February 6, 1943 | March 11, 1943 | Gregg |
| 48th | Cecil Storey | Democratic | March 11, 1943 | January 9, 1945 | Gregg |
| 49th | Cecil Storey | Democratic | January 15, 1945 | January 14, 1947 | Gregg |
| 50th | Cecil Storey | Democratic | January 14, 1947 | January 11, 1949 | Gregg |
| 51st | Cecil Storey | Democratic | January 11, 1949 | January 9, 1951 | Gregg |
| 52nd | Dexter Harold Buchanan | Democratic | January 9, 1951 | January 13, 1953 | Gregg |
| 53rd | Charles Hancock | Democratic | January 13, 1953 | January 11, 1955 | Nacogdoches |
| 54th | John Charles Heitman Jr. | Democratic | January 11, 1955 | January 8, 1957 | Nacogdoches |
| 55th | John Charles Heitman Jr. | Democratic | January 8, 1957 | March 23, 1957 | Nacogdoches |
| 55th | Vacant | N/A | March 23, 1957 | May 9, 1957 | Nacogdoches |
| 55th | Curtis George Goetz | Democratic | May 9, 1957 | January 13, 1959 | San Augustine |
| 56th | Steve Alton Burgess | Democratic | January 13, 1959 | January 10, 1961 | Nacogdoches |
| 57th | Steve Alton Burgess | Democratic | January 10, 1961 | January 8, 1963 | Nacogdoches |
| 58th | Charlie Wilson | Democratic | January 8, 1963 | January 12, 1965 | Angelina |
| 59th | Charlie Wilson | Democratic | January 12, 1965 | January 10, 1967 | Angelina |
| 60th | David William Crews | Democratic | January 10, 1967 | January 14, 1969 | Montgomery |
| 61st | Price Daniel Jr. | Democratic | January 14, 1967 | January 12, 1971 | Liberty |
| 62nd | Price Daniel Jr. | Democratic | January 12, 1971 | January 9, 1973 | Liberty |
| 63rd | Arthur Buddy Temple III | Democratic | January 9, 1973 | January 14, 1975 | Angelina |
| 64th | Arthur Buddy Temple III | Democratic | January 14, 1975 | January 11, 1977 | Angelina |
| 65th | Arthur Buddy Temple III | Democratic | January 11, 1977 | January 9, 1979 | Angelina |
| 66th | Arthur Buddy Temple III | Democratic | January 9, 1979 | January 13, 1981 | Angelina |
| 67th | Oscar Brookshire | Democratic | January 13, 1981 | January 11, 1983 | Angelina |
| 68th | David Hudson | Democratic | January 11, 1983 | January 8, 1985 | Smith |
| 69th | David Hudson | Democratic | January 8, 1985 | January 13, 1987 | Smith |
| 70th | David Hudson | Democratic | January 13, 1987 | January 10, 1989 | Smith |
| 71st | David Hudson | Democratic | January 10, 1989 | January 8, 1991 | Smith |
| 72nd | Ted Kamel | Republican | January 8, 1991 | January 12, 1993 | Smith |
| 73rd | Ted Kamel | Republican | January 12, 1993 | January 10, 1995 | Smith |
| 74th | Ted Kamel | Republican | January 10, 1995 | January 14, 1997 | Smith |
| 75th | Ted Kamel | Republican | January 14, 1997 | January 12, 1999 | Smith |
| 76th | Leo Berman | Republican | January 12, 1999 | January 9, 2001 | Smith |
| 77th | Leo Berman | Republican | January 9, 2001 | January 14, 2003 | Smith |
| 78th | Leo Berman | Republican | January 14, 2003 | January 11, 2005 | Smith |
| 79th | Leo Berman | Republican | January 11, 2005 | January 9, 2007 | Smith |
| 80th | Leo Berman | Republican | January 9, 2007 | January 13, 2009 | Smith |
| 81st | Leo Berman | Republican | January 13, 2009 | January 11, 2011 | Smith |
| 82nd | Leo Berman | Republican | January 11, 2011 | January 8, 2013 | Smith |
| 83rd | Matt Schaefer | Republican | January 8, 2013 | January 13, 2015 | Smith |
| 84th | Matt Schaefer | Republican | January 13, 2015 | January 10, 2017 | Smith |
| 85th | Matt Schaefer | Republican | January 10, 2015 | January 8, 2019 | Smith |
| 86th | Matt Schaefer | Republican | January 8, 2019 | January 12, 2021 | Smith |
| 87th | Matt Schaefer | Republican | January 12, 2021 | January 10, 2023 | Smith |
| 88th | Matt Schaefer | Republican | January 10, 2023 | January 14, 2025 | Smith |
| 89th | Daniel Alders | Republican | January 14, 2025 | Present | Smith |
