= Texas's 3rd Senate district =

American legislative district

Texas's 3rd State Senate district
Senator
Robert Nichols; R–Jacksonville
- Demographics: 72.5% White; 12.8% Black; 12.9% Hispanic; 1.8% Other
- Population: 843,567

District 3 of the Texas Senate is a senatorial district that serves all of Anderson, Angelina, Cherokee, Hardin, Henderson, Houston, Jasper, Liberty, Nacogdoches, Newton, Orange, Polk, Sabine, San Augustine, Shelby, Trinity, and Tyler counties, and a portion of Jefferson county in the U.S. state of Texas. The current senator from District 3 is Robert Nichols.

== Election history ==
Election history of District 3 from 1992.

=== 2022 ===
2022 Texas State Senate election: Senate District 3
Party	Candidate	Votes	%	±%
Republican	Robert Nichols (incumbent)	213,288	77.41	−0.86
Democratic	Steve Russell	58,285	21.16	+0.63
Libertarian	Desarae Lindsey	3,941	1.43	+0.23
Total votes		275,514		
Republican hold				

=== 2018 ===
2018 Texas State Senate election: Senate District 3
Party	Candidate	Votes	%	±%
Republican	Robert Nichols (incumbent)	215,058	78.27	−12.29
Democratic	Shirley Layton	56,398	20.53	+20.53
Libertarian	Bruce Quarles	3,301	1.20	−8.24
Total votes		274,757		
Republican hold				

Democratic primary
Party	Candidate	Votes	%
Democratic	Shirley Layton	12,452	100.0
Total votes		12,452	100.0

Republican primary
Party	Candidate	Votes	%
Republican	Robert Nichols (incumbent)	78,434	100.0
Total votes		78,434	100.0

=== 2014 ===
2014 Texas State Senate election: Senate District 3
Party	Candidate	Votes	%	±%
Republican	Robert Nichols	140,069	90.56	−9.44
Libertarian	J. Tyler Lindsey	14,605	9.44	+9.44
Majority		154,674	100.00	
Turnout		226,978		
Republican hold				

=== 2012 ===
2012 Texas State Senate election: Senate District 3
Party	Candidate	Votes	%	±%
Republican	Robert Nichols	226,978	100.00	
Majority		226,978	100.00	
Turnout		226,978		
Republican hold				

=== 2006 ===
Texas general election, 2006: Senate District 3
Party	Candidate	Votes	%	±%
Republican	Robert Nichols	119,629	100.00	+11.77
Majority		119,629	100.00	+23.53
Turnout		119,629		−12.03
Republican hold				

Republican primary, 2006: Senate District 3
Candidate		Votes	%	±
	Frank Denton	5,635	15.15	
	Dave Kleimann	6,716	18.05	
✓	Robert Nichols	20,176	54.24	
	Bob Reeves	4,674	12.56	
Majority		13,460	36.18	
Turnout		37,201		

=== 2002 ===
Texas general election, 2002: Senate District 3
Party	Candidate	Votes	%	±%
Republican	Todd Staples	119,993	88.23	+27.59
Libertarian	Michael Carter	16,001	11.76	+11.76
Majority		103,992	76.47	+55.18
Turnout		135,994		−45.92
Republican hold				

=== 2000 ===
Texas general election, 2000: Senate District 3
Party	Candidate	Votes	%	±%
Republican	Todd Staples	152,514	60.64	+10.55
Democratic	David Fisher	98,976	39.36	−10.55
Majority		53,538	21.29	+21.10
Turnout		251,490		+20.88
Republican hold				

Republican primary, 2000: Senate District 3
Candidate		Votes	%	±
	Van Brookshire	4,875	11.08	
	Les Tarrance	8,816	18.05	
✓	Todd Staples	20,367	70.15	
Majority		21,522	52.10	
Turnout		29,183		

=== 1996 ===
Texas general election, 1996: Senate District 3
Party	Candidate	Votes	%	±%
Republican	Drew Nixon	104,222	50.09	−2.26
Democratic	Jerry K. Johnson	103,835	49.91	+2.26
Majority		387	0.19	−4.52
Turnout		208,057		+30.02
Republican hold				

Democratic primary, 1996: Senate District 3
Candidate		Votes	%	±
✓	Jerry K. Johnson	38,913	57.10	
	Dick Swift	18,043	26.48	
	Ralph Wallace	11,191	16.42	
Majority		20,870	30.62	
Turnout		68,147		

=== 1994 ===
Texas general election, 1994: Senate District 3
Party	Candidate	Votes	%	±%
Republican	Drew Nixon	83,779	52.35	+6.21
Democratic	Curtis Soileau	76,245	47.65	−6.21
Majority		7,534	4.71	−3.02
Turnout		160,024		−26.77
Republican gain from Democratic				

=== 1992 ===
Texas general election, 1992: Senate District 3
Party	Candidate	Votes	%	±%
Democratic	Bill Haley	117,709	53.86	
Republican	Gene Shull	100,826	46.14	
Majority		16,883	7.73	
Turnout		218,535		
Democratic hold				

Democratic primary, 1992: Senate District 3
Candidate		Votes	%	±
	John Blair	29,216	35.15	
✓	Bill Haley	53,894	64.85	
Majority		24,678	29.69	
Turnout		83,110		

Republican primary, 1992: Senate District 3
Candidate		Votes	%	±
	Vernon Krueger	7,968	33.74	
✓	Gene Shull	12,228	51.78	
	Tom Sisk	3,421	14.49	
Majority		4,260	18.04	
Turnout		23,617		

== District officeholders ==
Legislature	Senator, District 3	Counties in District
1	William Thomas Scott; Edward Clark	Harrison
2	Edward Clark	Harrison
3	Hardin Hart	Fannin, Hopkins, Hunt
4	Sam Bogart	Collin, Cooke, Dallas, Denton, Grayson
5	Hardin Hart	Fannin, Hunt
6	Robert H. Taylor	Fannin, Hunt
7	Robert H. Taylor	Fannin, Hunt
8	Martin D. Hart; Turner L. Greene	Fannin, Hunt
9	M. W. Wheeler	Angelina, Nacogdoches, San Augustine
10	Henry M. Kinsey	Angelina, Nacogdoches, San Augustine
11	Frederick Voight; James W. Guinn	Angelina, Nacogdoches, San Augustine
12	James Eldrage Dillard; Mijamin Priest	Cherokee, Houston
13	James Eldrage Dillard	Cherokee, Houston
14	James Eldrage Dillard	Angelina, Cherokee, Houston, Trinity
15	James W. Motley	Panola, Rusk, Shelby
16	James W. Motley	Panola, Rusk, Shelby
17	Richard M. Wynne	Panola, Rusk, Shelby
18	William Henry Pope	Harrison
19	William Henry Pope	Harrison
20	William Henry Pope	Harrison
21	William Henry Pope	Harrison
22	William Henry Pope	Harrison
23	Edwin L. Agnew	Fannin, Lamar
24	Edwin L. Agnew	Fannin, Lamar
25	Robert L. Ross	Fannin, Lamar
26	Robert L. Ross	Fannin, Lamar
27	Charles A. Wheeler	Fannin, Lamar
28	Travis C. Henderson	Fannin, Lamar
29	A. P. Barrett	Fannin, Lamar
30	A. P. Barrett	Fannin, Lamar
31	B. B. Sturgeon	Fannin, Lamar
32	B. B. Sturgeon	Fannin, Lamar
33	Flavious M. Gibson	Fannin, Lamar
34	Flavious M. Gibson	Fannin, Lamar
35	Flavious M. Gibson	Fannin, Lamar
36	Flavious M. Gibson	Fannin, Lamar
37	Henry Lewis Darwin	Fannin, Lamar
38	Henry Lewis Darwin	Fannin, Lamar
39	I. D. Fairchild	Angelina, Cherokee, Jasper, Nacogdoches, Newton, Sabine, San Augustine, Tyler
40	I. D. Fairchild	Angelina, Cherokee, Jasper, Nacogdoches, Newton, Sabine, San Augustine, Tyler
41	William E. Thomason	Angelina, Cherokee, Jasper, Nacogdoches, Newton, Sabine, San Augustine, Tyler
42	William E. Thomason	Angelina, Cherokee, Jasper, Nacogdoches, Newton, Sabine, San Augustine, Tyler
43	John S. Redditt	Angelina, Cherokee, Jasper, Nacogdoches, Newton, Sabine, San Augustine, Tyler
44	John S. Redditt	Angelina, Cherokee, Jasper, Nacogdoches, Newton, Sabine, San Augustine, Tyler
45	John S. Redditt	Angelina, Cherokee, Jasper, Nacogdoches, Newton, Sabine, San Augustine, Tyler
46	John S. Redditt	Angelina, Cherokee, Jasper, Nacogdoches, Newton, Sabine, San Augustine, Tyler
47	Ben Ramsey	Angelina, Cherokee, Jasper, Nacogdoches, Newton, Sabine, San Augustine, Tyler
48	Ben Ramsey	Angelina, Cherokee, Jasper, Nacogdoches, Newton, Sabine, San Augustine, Tyler
49	Ben Ramsey	Angelina, Cherokee, Jasper, Nacogdoches, Newton, Sabine, San Augustine, Tyler
50	Ben Ramsey	Angelina, Cherokee, Jasper, Nacogdoches, Newton, Sabine, San Augustine, Tyler
51	Ottis Elmer Lock	Angelina, Cherokee, Jasper, Nacogdoches, Newton, Sabine, San Augustine, Tyler
52	Ottis Elmer Lock	Angelina, Cherokee, Jasper, Nacogdoches, Newton, Sabine, San Augustine, Tyler
53	Ottis Elmer Lock	Angelina, Cherokee, Hardin, Jasper, Nacogdoches, Newton, Sabine, San Augustine, Tyler
54	Ottis Elmer Lock	Angelina, Cherokee, Hardin, Jasper, Nacogdoches, Newton, Sabine, San Augustine, Tyler
55	Ottis Elmer Lock	Angelina, Cherokee, Hardin, Jasper, Nacogdoches, Newton, Sabine, San Augustine, Tyler
56	Martin Dies Jr.	Angelina, Cherokee, Hardin, Jasper, Nacogdoches, Newton, Sabine, San Augustine, Tyler
57	Martin Dies Jr.	Angelina, Cherokee, Hardin, Jasper, Nacogdoches, Newton, Sabine, San Augustine, Tyler
58	Martin Dies Jr.	Angelina, Cherokee, Hardin, Jasper, Nacogdoches, Newton, Sabine, San Augustine, Tyler
59	Martin Dies Jr.	Angelina, Cherokee, Hardin, Jasper, Nacogdoches, Newton, Sabine, San Augustine, Tyler
60	Charles Wilson	Anderson, Angelina, Cherokee, Hardin, Henderson, Jasper, Nacogdoches, Navarro, Newton, Sabine, San Augustine, Tyler
61	Charles Wilson	Anderson, Angelina, Cherokee, Hardin, Henderson, Jasper, Nacogdoches, Navarro, Newton, Sabine, San Augustine, Tyler
62	Charles Wilson	Anderson, Angelina, Cherokee, Hardin, Henderson, Jasper, Nacogdoches, Navarro, Newton, Polk, Sabine, San Augustine, Tyler
63	Don Adams	Anderson, Angelina, Cherokee, Hardin, Henderson, Jasper, Kaufman, Nacogdoches, Newton, Panola, Rusk, Sabine, San Augustine, Shelby, Tyler
64	Don Adams	Anderson, Angelina, Cherokee, Hardin, Henderson, Jasper, Kaufman, Nacogdoches, Newton, Panola, Rusk, Sabine, San Augustine, Shelby, Tyler
65	Don Adams	Anderson, Angelina, Cherokee, Hardin, Henderson, Jasper, Kaufman, Nacogdoches, Newton, Panola, Rusk, Sabine, San Augustine, Shelby, Tyler
66	Roy Blake, Sr.	Anderson, Angelina, Cherokee, Hardin, Henderson, Jasper, Kaufman, Nacogdoches, Newton, Panola, Rusk, Sabine, San Augustine, Shelby, Tyler
67	Roy Blake, Sr.	Anderson, Angelina, Cherokee, Hardin, Henderson, Jasper, Kaufman, Nacogdoches, Newton, Panola, Rusk, Sabine, San Augustine, Shelby, Tyler
68	Roy Blake, Sr.	All of Anderson, Angelina, Cherokee, Hardin, Jasper, Nacogdoches, Newton, Polk, Rusk, Sabine, San Augustine, San Jacinto, Shelby, Tyler; Portion of Montgomery
69	Roy Blake, Sr.	All of Anderson, Angelina, Cherokee, Hardin, Jasper, Nacogdoches, Newton, Polk, Rusk, Sabine, San Augustine, San Jacinto, Shelby, Tyler; Portion of Montgomery
70	Roy Blake, Sr.	All of Anderson, Angelina, Cherokee, Hardin, Jasper, Nacogdoches, Newton, Polk, Rusk, Sabine, San Augustine, San Jacinto, Shelby, Tyler; Portion of Montgomery
71	Bill Haley	All of Anderson, Angelina, Cherokee, Hardin, Jasper, Nacogdoches, Newton, Polk, Rusk, Sabine, San Augustine, San Jacinto, Shelby, Tyler; Portion of Montgomery
72	Bill Haley	All of Anderson, Angelina, Cherokee, Hardin, Jasper, Nacogdoches, Newton, Polk, Rusk, Sabine, San Augustine, San Jacinto, Shelby, Tyler; Portion of Montgomery
73	Bill Haley	All of Anderson, Angelina, Cherokee, Hardin, Henderson, Jasper, Nacogdoches, Newton, Polk, Sabine, San Augustine, San Jacinto, Shelby, Tyler; Portion of Montgomery
74	Drew Nixon	All of Anderson, Angelina, Cherokee, Hardin, Henderson, Jasper, Nacogdoches, Newton, Panola, Polk, Sabine, San Augustine, San Jacinto, Shelby, Tyler; Portions of Montgomery, Smith
75	Drew Nixon	All of Anderson, Angelina, Cherokee, Hardin, Henderson, Jasper, Nacogdoches, Newton, Panola, Polk, Sabine, San Augustine, San Jacinto, Shelby, Tyler; Portions of Montgomery, Smith
76	Drew Nixon	All of Anderson, Angelina, Cherokee, Hardin, Henderson, Jasper, Nacogdoches, Newton, Panola, Polk, Sabine, San Augustine, San Jacinto, Shelby, Tyler; Portions of Montgomery, Smith
77	Todd Staples	All of Anderson, Angelina, Cherokee, Hardin, Henderson, Jasper, Nacogdoches, Newton, Panola, Polk, Sabine, San Augustine, San Jacinto, Shelby, Tyler; Portions of Montgomery, Smith
78	Todd Staples	All of Anderson, Angelina, Cherokee, Hardin, Henderson, Jasper, Nacogdoches, Newton, Polk, Sabine, San Augustine, San Jacinto, Shelby, Tyler; Portions of Montgomery, Smith
79	Todd Staples	All of Anderson, Angelina, Cherokee, Hardin, Henderson, Jasper, Nacogdoches, Newton, Polk, Sabine, San Augustine, San Jacinto, Shelby, Tyler; Portions of Montgomery, Smith
80	Robert Nichols	All of Anderson, Angelina, Cherokee, Hardin, Henderson, Jasper, Nacogdoches, Newton, Polk, Sabine, San Augustine, San Jacinto, Shelby, Tyler; Portions of Montgomery, Smith
81	Robert Nichols	All of Anderson, Angelina, Cherokee, Hardin, Henderson, Jasper, Nacogdoches, Newton, Polk, Sabine, San Augustine, San Jacinto, Shelby, Tyler; Portions of Montgomery, Smith
82	Robert Nichols	All of Anderson, Angelina, Cherokee, Hardin, Henderson, Jasper, Nacogdoches, Newton, Polk, Sabine, San Augustine, San Jacinto, Shelby, Tyler; Portions of Montgomery, Smith
83	Robert Nichols	Anderson, Angelina, Cherokee, Hardin, Henderson, Houston, Jasper, Liberty, Montgomery, Nacogdoches, Newton, Orange, Polk, Sabine, San Augustine, San Jacinto, Shelby, Trinity, Tyler
84	Robert Nichols	Anderson, Angelina, Cherokee, Hardin, Henderson, Houston, Jasper, Liberty, Montgomery, Nacogdoches, Newton, Orange, Polk, Sabine, San Augustine, San Jacinto, Shelby, Trinity, Tyler
85	Robert Nichols	Anderson, Angelina, Cherokee, Hardin, Henderson, Houston, Jasper, Liberty, Montgomery, Nacogdoches, Newton, Orange, Polk, Sabine, San Augustine, San Jacinto, Shelby, Trinity, Tyler
86	Robert Nichols	Anderson, Angelina, Cherokee, Hardin, Henderson, Houston, Jasper, Liberty, Montgomery, Nacogdoches, Newton, Orange, Polk, Sabine, San Augustine, San Jacinto, Shelby, Trinity, Tyler
87	Robert Nichols	Anderson, Angelina, Cherokee, Hardin, Henderson, Houston, Jasper, Liberty, Montgomery, Nacogdoches, Newton, Orange, Polk, Sabine, San Augustine, San Jacinto, Shelby, Trinity, Tyler
88	Robert Nichols	Anderson, Angelina, Cherokee, Hardin, Henderson, Houston, Jasper, Jefferson (part), Liberty, Nacogdoches, Newton, Orange, Polk, Sabine, San Augustine, Shelby, Trinity, Tyler
89	Robert Nichols	Anderson, Angelina, Cherokee, Hardin, Henderson, Houston, Jasper, Jefferson (part), Liberty, Nacogdoches, Newton, Orange, Polk, Sabine, San Augustine, Shelby, Trinity, Tyler
