= Texas's 4th House of Representatives district =

American legislative district

Texas's 4th State House of Representatives district
Representative
Keith Bell; R–Forney
- Demographics: 58.9% White; 14.4% Black; 22.5% Hispanic; 1.8% Asian; 2.4% Other
- Population (2020) • Voting age: 195,819; 143,550

District 4 is a district in the Texas House of Representatives. It was created in the 3rd legislature (1849–1851).

The district has been represented by Republican Keith Bell since January 8, 2019, upon his initial election to the Texas House.

As a result of redistricting after the 2020 Federal census, from the 2022 elections the district encompasses all of Kaufman County and the northwestern portion of Henderson County. Major cities in the district include Forney, Kaufman, and Terrell, and the majority of Athens. The district also includes the main campus of Trinity Valley Community College and all of Cedar Creek Reservoir.

== List of representatives ==
Leg.	Representative	Party	Term start	Term end	Counties represented
3rd	Alfred Elkins Pace	Unknown	November 5, 1849	September 7, 1850	Fannin
3rd	Vacant	N/A	September 7, 1850	November 18, 1850	Fannin
3rd	Harrison G. Hendricks	Unknown	November 18, 1850	November 3, 1851	Fannin
4th	Randolph C. Doom	Unknown	November 3, 1851	November 7, 1853	Jasper, Newton, Sabine
4th	Joshua H. Speights	Unknown	November 3, 1851	November 7, 1853	Jasper, Newton, Sabine
5th	Robert H. Taylor	Unknown	November 7, 1853	November 5, 1855	Fannin
6th	Thomas N. Pettus	Unknown	November 5, 1855	November 2, 1857	Fannin
7th	Gideon W. Smith	Unknown	November 2, 1857	November 7, 1859	Fannin
8th	Robert H. Taylor	Unknown	November 7, 1859	November 4, 1861	Fannin
9th	Lipscomb Norvell Jr.	Unknown	November 4, 1861	January 14, 1862	Jasper, Newton
9th	Vacant	N/A	January 14, 1862	August 4, 1862	Jasper, Newton
9th	W. T. Roberts	Unknown	August 4, 1862	February 1, 1863	Jasper, Newton
10th	A. N. Perkins	Unknown	November 2, 1863	August 6, 1866	Jasper, Newton
11th	Randolph C. Doom	Unknown	August 6, 1866	February 7, 1870	Jasper, Newton
12th	John M. Morrison	Republican	February 8, 1870	January 14, 1873	Anderson, Henderson, Van Zandt
12th	J. M. Manning	Republican	February 8, 1870	January 14, 1873	Anderson, Henderson, Van Zandt
12th	Winfield B. Stirman	Democratic	February 11, 1870	January 14, 1873	Anderson, Henderson, Van Zandt
13th	John M. McDonald	Democratic	January 14, 1873	January 13, 1874	Anderson, Henderson, Van Zandt
13th 14th	James Eastland	Democratic	January 14, 1873	April 18, 1876	Anderson, Henderson, Van Zandt
13th 14th	James M. Harrison	Democratic	January 14, 1873	April 18, 1876	Anderson, Henderson, Kaufman, Rockwall, Van Zandt
14th	A. D. Edwards	Democratic	January 13, 1874	April 18, 1876	Anderson, Henderson, Kaufman, Rockwall, Van Zandt
14th	William M. Lindsey	Democratic	January 13, 1874	April 18, 1876	Anderson, Henderson, Kaufman, Rockwall, Van Zandt
15th	Alexander Horton	Democratic	April 18, 1876	January 14, 1879	Sabine, San Augustine
16th	James T. Polley	Democratic	January 14, 1879	January 11, 1881	Sabine, San Augustine
17th	James T. Polley	Democratic	January 11, 1881	January 9, 1883	Sabine, San Augustine
18th	Jesse J. Watkins	Democratic	January 9, 1883	January 13, 1885	Angelina, Nacogdoches
19th	George F. Ingraham	Democratic	January 13, 1885	January 11, 1887	Angelina, Nacogdoches
20th	James L. Gilliland	Democratic	January 11, 1887	January 8, 1889	Angelina, Nacogdoches
21st	James Linn Crossland	Democratic	January 8, 1889	January 13, 1891	Angelina, Nacogdoches
22nd	Elias B. Lewis	Democratic	January 13, 1891	January 10, 1893	Angelina, Nacogdoches
23rd	Alvin B. Baker	Democratic	January 10, 1893	January 8, 1895	Red River
24th	J. M. Nix	Populist	January 8, 1895	January 12, 1897	Red River
25th	Preston W. Henderson	Democratic	January 12, 1897	January 10, 1899	Red River
26th	Charles M. Chambers	Democratic	January 10, 1899	January 8, 1901	Red River
27th	Richard H. Wells	Democratic	January 8, 1901	January 13, 1903	Red River
28th	Elvis A. Calvin	Democratic	January 13, 1903	January 10, 1905	Lamar
28th	William M. Hodges	Democratic	January 13, 1903	January 10, 1905	Lamar
29th	Clarence Sperry	Democratic	January 10, 1905	January 8, 1907	Lamar
29th	James C. Mason	Democratic	February 2, 1905	January 8, 1907	Lamar
30th	Clarence Sperry	Democratic	January 8, 1907	January 12, 1909	Lamar
30th	James C. Mason	Democratic	January 8, 1907	January 12, 1909	Lamar
31st	James C. Mason	Democratic	January 12, 1909	January 10, 1911	Lamar
31st	Charles Roach	Democratic	January 12, 1909	January 10, 1911	Lamar
32nd	Columbus A. Martin	Democratic	January 10, 1911	January 14, 1913	Lamar
32nd	Robert L. McDowra	Democratic	January 10, 1911	January 14, 1913	Lamar
33rd	James B. Furrh	Democratic	January 14, 1913	January 12, 1915	Harrison
34th	James B. Furrh	Democratic	January 12, 1915	January 9, 1917	Harrison
35th	Madison M. O'Banion	Democratic	January 9, 1917	January 14, 1919	Harrison
36th	Madison M. O'Banion	Democratic	January 14, 1919	January 11, 1921	Harrison
37th	Virgil D. Fugler	Democratic	January 11, 1921	January 9, 1923	Harrison
38th	Virgil D. Fugler	Democratic	January 9, 1923	July 20, 1924	Harrison
38th	James M. Perdue	Democratic	January 9, 1923	January 13, 1925	Camp, Upshur
39th	James M. Perdue	Democratic	January 13, 1925	January 11, 1927	Camp, Upshur
40th	Jefferson D. Bass	Democratic	January 11, 1927	January 8, 1929	Camp, Upshur
41st	Thurman W. Adkins	Democratic	January 8, 1929	January 13, 1931	Camp, Upshur
42nd	Thurman W. Adkins	Democratic	January 13, 1931	January 10, 1933	Camp, Upshur
43rd	Otis T. Dunagan	Democratic	January 10, 1933	January 8, 1935	Camp, Upshur
44th	Otis T. Dunagan	Democratic	January 8, 1935	January 12, 1937	Camp, Upshur
45th	Lindley Beckworth	Democratic	January 12, 1937	January 10, 1939	Camp, Upshur
46th	Matt Davis	Democratic	January 10, 1939	January 14, 1941	Camp, Upshur
47th	Noel C. Baker	Democratic	January 14, 1941	January 12, 1943	Camp, Upshur
48th	Noel C. Baker	Democratic	January 12, 1943	January 9, 1945	Camp, Upshur
49th	Noel C. Baker	Democratic	January 9, 1945	November 17, 1945	Camp, Upshur
49th	Vacant	N/A	November 17, 1945	January 14, 1947	Camp, Upshur
50th	Surry Turner	Democratic	January 14, 1947	January 11, 1949	Camp, Upshur
51st	Surry Turner	Democratic	January 11, 1949	January 9, 1951	Camp, Upshur
52nd	Julius Otto Duncan	Democratic	January 9, 1951	January 13, 1953	Camp, Upshur
53rd	Reagan R. Huffman	Democratic	January 13, 1953	January 11, 1955	Harrison
54th	Reagan R. Huffman	Democratic	January 11, 1955	January 8, 1957	Harrison
55th	Reagan R. Huffman	Democratic	January 8, 1957	January 13, 1959	Harrison
56th	Reagan R. Huffman	Democratic	January 13, 1959	January 10, 1961	Harrison
57th	Lonnie Nelson Cowles	Democratic	January 10, 1961	January 8, 1963	Harrison
58th	Guy V. McDonald	Democratic	January 8, 1963	January 12, 1965	Panola, Rusk
59th	Guy V. McDonald	Democratic	January 12, 1965	January 10, 1967	Panola, Rusk
60th	Steve A. Burgess	Democratic	January 10, 1967	January 14, 1969	Nacogdoches, Sabine, San Augustine, Shelby
61st	Steve A. Burgess	Democratic	January 14, 1969	January 12, 1971	Nacogdoches, Sabine, San Augustine, Shelby
62nd	Steve A. Burgess	Democratic	January 12, 1971	January 9, 1973	Nacogdoches, Sabine, San Augustine, Shelby
63rd	Roy Blake, Sr.	Democratic	January 9, 1973	January 14, 1975	Nacogdoches, Panola, Shelby
64th	Roy Blake, Sr.	Democratic	January 14, 1975	January 11, 1977	Nacogdoches, Panola, Shelby
65th	Roy Blake, Sr.	Democratic	January 11, 1977	January 10, 1978	Nacogdoches, Panola, Shelby
65th	Vacant	N/A	January 10, 1978	March 1, 1978	Nacogdoches, Panola, Shelby
65th	Bill Haley	Democratic	March 1, 1978	January 9, 1979	Nacogdoches, Panola, Shelby
66th	Bill Haley	Democratic	January 9, 1979	January 13, 1981	Nacogdoches, Panola, Shelby
67th	Bill Haley	Democratic	January 13, 1981	January 11, 1983	Nacogdoches, Panola, Shelby
68th	Gordon Arnold Jr.	Democratic	January 11, 1983	January 8, 1985	Ellis, Kaufman
69th	Gordon Arnold Jr.	Democratic	January 8, 1985	August 14, 1985	Ellis, Kaufman
69th	Vacant	N/A	August 14, 1985	December 18, 1985	Ellis, Kaufman
69th	William K. Oakley	Democratic	December 18, 1985	January 13, 1987	Ellis, Kaufman
70th	William K. Oakley	Democratic	January 13, 1987	January 10, 1989	Ellis, Kaufman
71st	William K. Oakley	Democratic	January 10, 1989	January 8, 1991	Ellis, Kaufman
72nd	William K. Oakley	Democratic	January 8, 1991	January 12, 1993	Ellis, Kaufman
73rd	William K. Oakley	Democratic	January 12, 1993	January 10, 1995	Hunt, Kaufman
74th	William K. Oakley	Democratic	January 10, 1995	January 14, 1997	Hunt, Kaufman
75th	William K. Oakley	Democratic	January 14, 1997	January 12, 1999	Hunt, Kaufman
76th	Betty Brown	Republican	January 12, 1999	January 9, 2001	Hunt, Kaufman
77th	Betty Brown	Republican	January 9, 2001	January 14, 2003	Hunt, Kaufman
78th	Betty Brown	Republican	January 14, 2003	January 11, 2005	Henderson, Kaufman
79th	Betty Brown	Republican	January 11, 2005	January 9, 2007	Henderson, Kaufman
80th	Betty Brown	Republican	January 9, 2007	January 13, 2009	Henderson, Kaufman
81st	Betty Brown	Republican	January 13, 2009	January 11, 2011	Henderson, Kaufman
82nd	Lance Gooden	Republican	January 11, 2011	January 8, 2013	Henderson, Kaufman
83rd	Lance Gooden	Republican	January 8, 2013	January 13, 2015	Henderson, Kaufman
84th	Stuart Spitzer	Republican	January 13, 2015	January 10, 2017	Henderson, Kaufman
85th	Lance Gooden	Republican	January 10, 2017	January 8, 2019	Henderson, Kaufman
86th	Keith Bell	Republican	January 8, 2019	January 12, 2021	Henderson, Kaufman
87th	Keith Bell	Republican	January 12, 2021	January 10, 2023	Henderson, Kaufman
88th	Keith Bell	Republican	January 10, 2023	January 14, 2025	Henderson, Kaufman
89th	Keith Bell	Republican	January 14, 2025	Present	Henderson, Kaufman
