= Chuck Hopson =

Texas state legislator and pharmacist

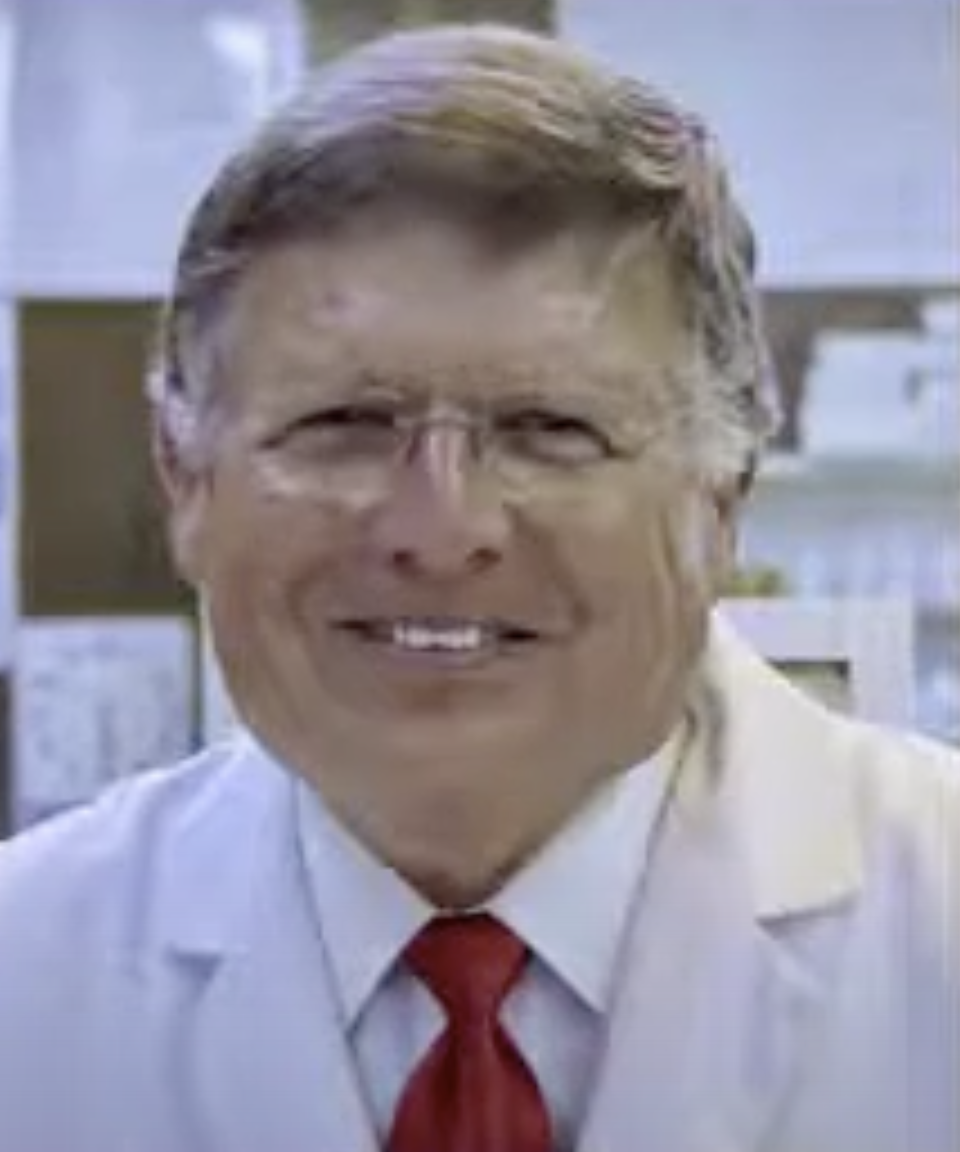

Member of the Texas House of Representatives from the 11th district
- In office January 9, 2001 – January 8, 2013
- Preceded by: Todd Staples
- Succeeded by: Travis Clardy

Personal details
- Born: Charles L. Hopson II; September 18, 1941 (age 85) Jacksonville, Texas, U.S.
- Party: Republican (after 2009); Democratic (before 2009)
- Spouse: Billie
- Children: 3
- Education: University of Houston (BS)
- Occupation: Pharmacist

Charles L. Hopson II (born September 18, 1941) is an American pharmacist who represented district 11 of the Texas House of Representatives from 2001 to 2013.

== Background ==
Hopson was born on September 18, 1941 in Jacksonville, Texas. He and his wife, Billie, who was a school teacher and counselor for over 30 years, had three children. In 1965, Hopson earned a Bachelor of Science in pharmacy from the University of Houston, and was an independent pharmacist who owned May Drugs in Jacksonville; he bought the pharmacy in 1973 from James May and it remained open until 2011, when Hopson sold the store to CVS Pharmacy. He cited his duties in Austin and concerns over his wife's health issues as the reason for the closure.

Hopson is a member of First Methodist Church of Jacksonville, where he has taught Sunday school.

== Texas House of Representatives ==
Prior to his election to the Texas House, Hopson served on the Jacksonville City Council and the Jacksonville ISD school board.

Hopson was elected as a Democrat to represent district 11 in 2000. At the time, district 11 was composed of Anderson County, Cherokee County, Leon County, and Robertson County, but in the next session it was redistricted to include Cherokee County, Panola County, Houston County, and Rusk County. He showed a willingness to work across party-lines with Republicans, and former Republican Lieutenant Governor Bill Ratliff described Hopson as having an "independent conservative philosophy".

Hopson would serve the district for six-terms, but starting in 2004, he began to have tightening elections, and in 2008, he defeated Republican challenger Brian Walker by only 120 votes. He was among a small sect of conservative Democratic representatives, along with Representative Jim McReynolds, who remained in office in rural Texas districts. However, Hopson announced he was party switching to the Republican Party on November 6, 2009, after ten years of serving as a Democrat. He indicated his switch was because Democrats in Washington, D.C., including President Barack Obama, did not represent the values of his district, but his critics speculated the switch was only to hang on to the conservative district in his upcoming elections after his narrow 2008 victory. In the 2010 Republican primary, Hopson secured the nomination with about 60% of the vote against two primary challengers, and he was re-elected on the Republican ticket in the general election with just over 75% of the vote.

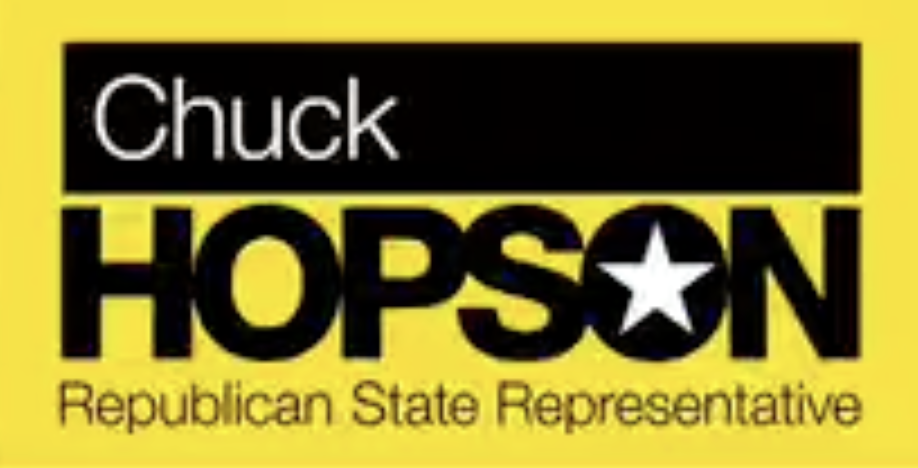
Hopson's campaign logo as it appeared in a campaign advertisement, 2012.

For the 2012 election cycle, district 11 was redrawn to include Nacogdoches County, Cherokee County, and Rusk County. The addition of Nacogdoches County and removal of two rural counties Hopson had been representing was disadvantageous to him, and this change amounted a Republican primary challenge from Travis Clardy, a lawyer from Nacogdoches, who was positioning himself as a conservative alternative. Hopson was scrutinized in the race for his voting record and history as a Democrat, notably his participation in the controversial actions by Democrats to skip town to prevent a vote on a Republican redistricting map in 2003, and Clardy characterized Hopson as "flip-flopping and wishy-washy" politician who did not provide "real direction or leadership". Hopson received several endorsements, including from the Texas Alliance for Life, an anti-abortion organization, and the National Rifle Association, as well as from Governor Rick Perry and then-Attorney General Greg Abbott. He raised about twice as much money as Clardy for the race, a total of $213,850 between January 15 and April 30, 2012. In the May 29th primary, Hopson came in at first place with 47.1% to Clardy's 46.3%; however, in the July 31 runoff, Clardy narrowly defeated Hopson with 51.87% of the vote to Hopson's 48.85%.

== See also ==
- List of American politicians who switched parties in office

Texas House of Representatives
Preceded by Todd Staples	Member of the Texas House of Representatives from the 11th district 2001–2013	Succeeded by Travis Clardy
