= Todd Staples =

American politician

President of the Texas Oil and Gas Association
- Incumbent
- Assumed office November 16, 2014
- Preceded by: Rob Looney

11th Texas Agriculture Commissioner
- In office January 4, 2007 – November 16, 2014
- Governor: Rick Perry
- Preceded by: Susan Combs
- Succeeded by: Sid Miller

Member of the Texas Senate from the 3rd district
- In office January 9, 2001 – January 4, 2007
- Preceded by: Drew Nixon
- Succeeded by: Robert Nichols

Member of the Texas House of Representatives from the 11th district
- In office February 17, 1995 – January 9, 2001
- Preceded by: Elton Bomer
- Succeeded by: Chuck Hopson

Personal details
- Born: Douglas Todd Staples; August 24, 1963 (age 63) Anderson County, Texas, U.S.
- Party: Republican
- Spouse: Tracy Staples (divorced) Janet Wendel Thorn (m. 1994)
- Children: 4
- Education: Texas A&M University (BS)
- Occupation: Real estate, ranching
- Website: Official website

Douglas Todd Staples (born August 24, 1963) is an American politician serving as the President of the Texas Oil and Gas Association since 2014. A member of the Republican Party, he served as the Agriculture Commissioner of Texas from 2007 to 2014, and as a member of the Texas Legislature from 1995 to 2007.

== Background ==
Staples was reared in Palestine, the seat of government of his native Anderson County in East Texas. He graduated from Palestine High School, where he was an active member of the Future Farmers of America. While in college, he served from 1981 to 1982 as state vice-president of the FFA. He attended Texas A&M University in College Station and graduated magna cum laude in 1984 with a Bachelor of Science in Agricultural Economics. He started a plant nursery and later became involved in cattle ranching with his family. He also owned a real estate business. For a time, he was an instructor at Trinity Valley Community College in Palestine.

Staples has two adult children from his first marriage, which ended in divorce.

Staples is a Southern Baptist deacon in his local church.

== Leading the Texas Oil & Gas Association ==
After a national search, Staples was selected to lead the Texas Oil & Gas Association (TXOGA) in 2014 because of his broad range of experience and leadership capabilities, according to the TXOGA Board of Directors. Representing the largest oil and national gas state in the nation, Staples implemented a multi-faceted approach to educate voters and elected officials on the industry's operations, commitments and contributions including regular communications with the media, educational events, speaking engagements across Texas and robust digital outreach efforts.

During his tenure, Staples has led several bipartisan efforts, including the creation and funding of TexNet Seismic Monitoring Program at the University of Texas Bureau of Economic Geology and the creation of the Texas Methane and Flaring Coalition, an industry-led effort to reduce methane emissions in oil and natural gas operations. He created regional Energy Summits featuring leaders like the Mayor of Houston and the President of Nasdaq and an annual Energy Elevated Technology Showcase to highlight industry innovation.

During the COVID-19 pandemic, Texas Governor Greg Abbott and the Texas Railroad Commission called on Staples to serve in leadership roles to enable Texas to recover from the pandemic's impact on the economy.

He serves as an expert witness for the Texas Legislature.

== Political career ==
Staples served on the non-partisan Palestine City Council from 1989 to 1991. In February 1995, he was elected to the Texas House of Representatives District 11 seat in a special election to replace Elton Bomer, who had been appointed state insurance commissioner by newly elected Governor George W. Bush. In a contest against two Democrats, Staples avoided a runoff by about sixty votes, having collected 50.6 percent of the vote.

In 2000, Staples entered the race for the District 3 seat in the Texas Senate, vacated by Drew Nixon. Despite personal scandal surrounding Nixon, Staples held the seat for the Republican Party, having received more than 60 percent of the vote in the general election. He represented Anderson, Angelina, Cherokee, Hardin, Henderson, Jasper, Nacogdoches, Newton, Polk, Sabine, San Augustine, San Jacinto, Shelby and Tyler counties, and portions of Montgomery and Smith counties.

In the Senate, Staples was the chairman of the Transportation & Homeland Security Committee, the Workers Compensation Select Interim Committee and the Texas Senate Republican Caucus. Staples sponsored and helped to pass a state constitutional amendment defining marriage as between one man and one woman. He was the vice-chair of the State Affairs Committee and the Veteran Affairs & Military Installations Committee.

Staples was unopposed for the Republican nomination for Agriculture Commissioner in 2006 when the incumbent Susan Combs instead was elected Texas Comptroller to succeed Carole Strayhorn. Staples defeated Democrat Hank Gilbert and Libertarian Clay Woolam in the November 7, 2006, general election. He received 2,307,406 votes (54.77 percent), a margin of 547,000 votes over Gilbert.

In 2010, Staples ran for re-election as Agriculture Commissioner and won with more than 60 percent of the votes, again against Democrat Hank Gilbert.

Staples explained that in his role as commissioner he is compelled to tell the story of agricultural success: "It's up to us to engage with consumers because we know there are those who do not appreciate the work that's being done and what that means for available and affordable food supply."

Staples was recognized by Texas A&M University as an accomplished public servant and enthusiastic champion for rural Texas and was noted for protecting consumers by initiating an unprecedented sweeping investigation into fraudulent operators of convenience stores suspected of defrauding unaware buyers of fuel. He partnered with then-Attorney General Greg Abbott, who obtained a jury verdict of $30 million against a Houston-based owner of convenience stores.

On September 18, 2014, Staples announced his resignation as Texas Agriculture Commissioner to become the president of the Texas Oil & Gas Association.

== 2014 primary for lieutenant governor ==
Though Staples enlisted baseball great Nolan Ryan as his campaign chairman, he finished third in the primary for lieutenant governor with 235,981 votes (17.8 percent).

== Positions ==
=== Same-sex Marriage ===
In 2003, Staples sponsored a bill that prohibited the State of Texas from recognizing same-sex marriages, then again in 2005, sponsored and campaigned for another bill that successfully amended the Texas Constitution to limit marriage to one man and one woman.

=== "Meatless Mondays" ===
In 2014, Staples criticized school districts that adopted "meatless Monday" policies, stating that "restricting children's meal choice to not include meat is irresponsible and has no place in our schools."

== Electoral history ==
2014

2014 Texas Lieutenant Governor Republican Primary Election
Party	Candidate	Votes	%
Republican	Dan Patrick	550,769	41.45
Republican	David Dewhurst (Incumbent)	376,196	28.31
Republican	Todd Staples	235,981	17.75
Republican	Jerry Patterson	165,787	12.47

2010

Texas general election, 2010: Texas Commissioner of Agriculture

Election
Party	Candidate	Party votes	%
Republican	Todd Staples	2,953,775	60.82
Democratic	Hank Gilbert	1,738,456	35.80
Libertarian	Rick Donaldson	164,035	3.38
Majority		—	—
Turnout		4,856,266	—	—

2006

Texas general election, 2006: Texas Commissioner of Agriculture
Party	Candidate	Votes	%	±%
Republican	Todd Staples	2,307,406	54.77	−4.77
Democratic	Hank Gilbert	1,760,402	41.79	+3.97
Libertarian	Clay Woolam	144,989	3.44	+2.26
Majority		547,004	12.98	−8.74
Turnout		4,212,797		−4.85
Republican hold				

2002

Texas general election, 2002: Senate District 3
Party	Candidate	Votes	%	±%
Republican	Todd Staples	119,993	88.23	+27.59
Libertarian	Michael Carter	16,001	11.76	+11.76
Majority		103,992	76.47	+55.18
Turnout		135,994		−45.92
Republican hold				

2000

Texas general election, 2000: Senate District 3
Party	Candidate	Votes	%	±%
Republican	Todd Staples	152,514	60.64	+10.55
Democratic	David Fisher	98,976	39.36	−10.55
Majority		53,538	21.29	+21.10
Turnout		251,490		+20.88
Republican hold				

2000

Republican primary, 2000: Senate District 3
Candidate		Votes	%	±
	Van Brookshire	4,875	11.08	
	Les Tarrance	8,816	18.05	
✓	Todd Staples	20,367	70.15	
Majority		21,522	52.10	
Turnout		29,183		

Party political offices
Preceded by Susan Combs	Republican nominee for Agriculture Commissioner of Texas; 2006, 2010	Succeeded by Sid Miller
Texas House of Representatives
Preceded by Elton Bomer	Member of the Texas House of Representatives from District 11 (Palestine); 1995–2001	Succeeded by Chuck Hopson
Texas Senate
Preceded by Drew Nixon	Texas State Senator from District 3 (Palestine); 2001–2007	Succeeded by Robert Nichols
Preceded by Susan Combs	Texas Agriculture Commissioner; 2007-2014	Succeeded by Sid Miller
