= Flavius M. Gibson =

American politician (1867–1922)

Flavious M. Gibson
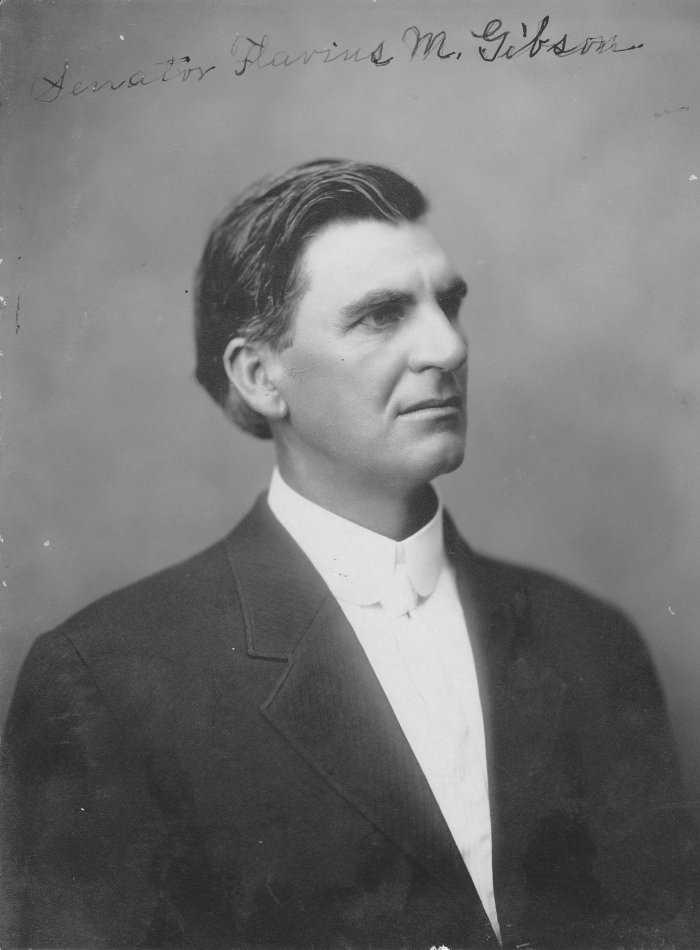

Member of the Texas Senate from the 3rd district
- In office January 14, 1913 – January 11, 1921
- Preceded by: B. B. Sturgeon
- Succeeded by: Henry Lewis Darwin
President pro tempore
President pro tempore of the Texas Senate
In office March 5, 1917 – March 21, 1917
Preceded by	John M. Henderson
Succeeded by	Ed Westbrook
In office September 22, 1914 – September 23, 1914
Preceded by	James R. Wiley
Succeeded by	Wright C. Morrow

Personal details
- Born: Flavius Marion Gibson; February 12, 1867 Virginia, U.S.
- Died: April 6, 1922 (aged 55) Bonham, Texas, U.S.
- Resting place: Wild Willow Cemetery, Bonham, Texas
- Party: Democratic
- Occupation: Educator, politician

Flavius Marion Gibson Sr. (February 12, 1867 – April 6, 1922) was a Texas legislator who served in the Texas Senate for district 3 representing Fannin County and Bonham County. He was a member of the Democratic Party.

== Personal life ==
Flavius Marion Gibson was born in Virginia on February 12, 1867. At the age of two, Gibson and his family moved to Texas. He was a teacher and was a superintendent for a public school, he also practiced law. He died on April 6, 1922, at the age of 55, in his home in Bonham, Texas following a ten day long illness. His final resting place is Wild Willow Cemetery in Bonham, Texas.

== Political career ==
Gibson served in the Texas Senate for district 3 from 1913 to 1921, he also served as president protempore two times, however, one of those times was only at the end of session. He represented Fannin County and Lamar County. He was a member of the Democratic Party.
