= Travis Clardy =

Texas politician

Member of the Texas House of Representatives from the 11th district
- In office January 8, 2013 – January 14, 2025
- Preceded by: Chuck Hopson
- Succeeded by: Joanne Shofner

Personal details
- Born: Travis Paul Clardy; January 13, 1962 (age 64)
- Party: Republican
- Spouse: Judy Clardy
- Children: 4
- Education: Abilene Christian University; Pepperdine University School of Law
- Occupation: Lawyer, businessman

Travis Paul Clardy (born January 13, 1962) is an attorney from Nacogdoches, Texas, who is a former Republican state representative for House District 11 in East Texas.

Clardy was defeated by Joanne Shofner by 63% to 37% on March 5, 2024, in the Republican primary runoff for the Texas House of Representatives for the 11th District.

== Affiliations ==
Clardy is a member of the executive board of the East Texas Boy Scouts of America and the Dean's Circle of the College of Fine Arts at Stephen F. Austin State University. He is also a Paul P. Harris Fellow at the Nacogdoches Rotary International, a sponsor of the Heartbeat Pregnancy Center, and is active on the alumni board of his alma mater, Abilene Christian University.

== Political positions ==
In 2012, Clardy narrowly defeated the incumbent Representative Chuck Hopson, in the Republican primary election.

In the 2013 legislative session, Clardy joined majorities in the House and Texas Senate to support SB5, which banned abortions after twenty weeks of gestation, required abortion providers to meet ambulatory surgical center facilities regulations, and required physicians to have admitting privileges at a hospital within thirty miles of their office. In 2016, the facilities and admitting privileges portions of the bill were ruled unconstitutional by the Supreme Court in Whole Woman's Health v. Hellerstedt.

Clardy served on the House committees on Human Services and Homeland Security and Public Safety.

In the Republican primary on March 4, 2014, Clardy won re-nomination to a second term. He received 13,054 (84 percent) to opponent Tony Sevilla, who polled 2,487 votes (16 percent).

In the general election on November 6, 2018, Clardy defeated Democrat Alec Johnson, 38,694 votes (74.4 percent) to 13,334 (25.6 percent).

During his re-election campaign in 2024, Clardy was issued a cease-and-desist letter from Governor Greg Abbott, telling him to quit claiming falsely that Abbott had endorsed his re-election campaign. In the March 2024 Republican primary, Clardy lost to Joanne Shofner. The loss came after Clardy's opposition to Governor Abbott's school voucher legislation in 2023.

== Personal life ==
Clardy and his wife, Judy, have four sons. He is a member of the Church of Christ.

Texas House of Representatives
Preceded by Chuck Hopson	Member of the Texas House of Representatives from the 11th district 2013–2025	Succeeded by Joanne Shofner
