= Edwin L. Agnew =

Texas politician

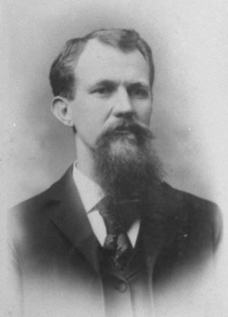

Member of the Texas Senate from the 3rd district
- In office January 10, 1893 – October 21, 1896
- Preceded by: William Henry Pope
- Succeeded by: Robert L. Ross

Member of the Texas House of Representatives from the 22nd district
- In office January 13, 1891 – January 10, 1893
- Preceded by: Thomas Henry Hayes
- Succeeded by: Jonathon Davenport Rudd

Personal details
- Born: December 4, 1855 Fannin County, Texas, U.S.
- Died: February 16, 1919 (aged 63)
- Party: Democratic
- Spouse: Belle Evans (m. 1880)
- Children: 1
- Education: Carlton College; Trinity University, Tehuacana (Note: Trinity University no longer has a branch in Tehuacana.)
- Occupation: Politician; lawyer

Edwin L. Agnew (December 4, 1855—February 16, 1919) was a Texas politician and lawyer who served in the Texas Senate representing district 3 and the Texas House of Representatives for the 22nd district. At the time, both districts were composed of Fannin and Lamar County

== Early life and career ==
Edwin L. Agnew was born on December 4, 1855, in Fannin County, Texas to Allen and Permelia (née Smith) Agnew. His father, a planter by trade, is a native of South Carolina and his mother is from Mississippi. He was the sixth of seven children. Agnew was educated at Carlton College in Bonham, Texas, and graduated from the law department of Trinity University at Tehuacana in 1877 (Trinity University no longer has a campus in Tehuacana). Agnew had a successful law practice in Bonham.

In 1878, Agnew was elected to be a magistrate for a six-year term. He was mayor of Bonham, having been elected in 1886 and re-elected in 1887.

== Texas legislature ==
Agnew was a Democrat. He represented district 22 of the Texas House of Representatives during the twenty-second Texas legislature. His predecessor was Thomas Henry Hayes and he took office on January 13, 1891, serving until January 10, 1893, when he was succeeded by Jonathon Davenport Rudd.

During the twenty-third and twenty-fourth Texas legislature, Agnew represented district 3 of the Texas Senate. He took office on January 10, 1993, succeeding William Henry Pope. Agnew resigned on October 21, 1896, and was succeeded by Robert L. Ross.

Both the 22nd House district and the 3rd Senate district were composed of Fannin County and Lamar County at the time.

== Personal life ==
Throughout his life, Agnew lived in the Fannin County. In 1880, he married Belle Evans, the daughter of W. A. Evans. The couple had one child, Ilene, together. Agnew was a member of Knights of Honor, and was an active member of a Christian church with his wife. Agnew had a good reputation and was well liked.

After struggling with a two-year-long illness, Agnew died on the morning of February 16, 1919 at the age of 63.
