= Smith Gilley =

American politician (1939–2026)

Member of the Texas House of Representatives from the 10th district
- In office 1975–1987
- Succeeded by: Bill Haley

Personal details
- Born: September 8, 1939 Miller Grove, Texas, U.S.
- Died: March 20, 2026 (aged 86) Texas, U.S.
- Party: Republican

Smith Edward Gilley (September 8, 1939 – March 20, 2026) was an American politician. He was a Republican member of the Texas House of Representatives from 1975 to 1987. Gilley died on March 20, 2026, at the age of 86.
