= Elton Bomer =

American politician (born 1935)

Elton L. Bomer

101st Secretary of State of Texas
- In office January 11, 1999 – December 31, 2000
- Governor: George W. Bush
- Preceded by: Alberto Gonzales
- Succeeded by: Henry Cuellar

Member of the Texas House of Representatives from the 11th district
- In office 1981–1985
- Preceded by: Bill Hollowell
- Succeeded by: Cliff Johnson
- In office 1991–1995
- Preceded by: Richard Swift
- Succeeded by: Todd Staples

Personal details
- Born: July 30, 1935 (age 91)
- Party: Democratic
- Education: University of Houston
- Profession: Businessman

Elton L. Bomer (born July 30, 1935) is an American politician in the state of Texas. He served in the Texas House of Representatives from 1981 to 1985 and 1991 to 1995 before serving as Secretary of State of Texas under Governor George W. Bush from 1999 to 2000.

Political offices
Preceded by Alberto Gonzales	Secretary of State of Texas; 1999–2000	Succeeded by Henry R. Cuellar
Texas House of Representatives
Preceded by Bill Hollowell	Texas State Representative from Anderson County (District 11); 1981–1985	Succeeded by Cliff Johnson
Preceded by Richard Swift	Texas State Representative from Anderson County (District 11); 1991–1995	Succeeded by Todd Staples
