= Texas's 10th House of Representatives district =

American legislative district

Texas's 10th State House of Representatives district
Representative
Brian Harrison; R–Midlothian
- Demographics: 55.3% White; 14.0% Black; 27.0% Hispanic; 1.4% Asian; 2.3% Other
- Population (2020) • Voting age: 192,455; 140,984

District 10 is a district in the Texas House of Representatives. It was created in the 3rd legislature (1849–1851).

The district has been represented by Republican Brian Harrison since September 28, 2021, upon his initial election to the Texas House after winning a special election to replace the outgoing Jake Ellzey who won the Texas District 6 seat in the United States House of Representatives.

As a result of redistricting after the 2020 Federal census, from the 2022 elections the district encompasses all of Ellis County, the only House district comprising the entirety of only a single county. Major cities in the district include Ennis, Midlothian, and Waxahachie.

== Members ==
- Smith Gilley (1975–1987)
- Bill Haley (1983–1989)
