= Robert L. Ross =

Texas legislator and lawyer

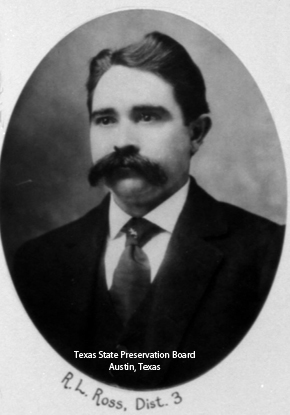

Member of the Texas Senate from the 3rd district
- In office January 12, 1897 – January 8, 1901
- Preceded by: Edwin L. Agnew
- Succeeded by: Charles Allen Wheeler

Personal details
- Born: October 8, 1863 Paris, Texas, U.S.
- Died: October 10, 1933 (aged 70)
- Party: Democratic
- Education: University of the City of New York
- Occupation: Lawyer

Robert L. Ross (October 8, 1863—October 10, 1933) was a Texas legislator and lawyer who served in the Texas Senate for the 3rd district from 1897 to 1901.

== Early life and career ==
Ross was born on October 8, 1863, in Paris, Texas to Frank W. Ross and Elizabeth (née Wells) Ross. His father had moved from Tennessee to Texas in 1839 and worked as a farmer. He was the youngest of eleven children. His mother and father died in 1868 and 1888, respectively. Ross graduated in 1877 from the law department of the University of the City of New York (modern day New York University).

Ross practiced law in Paris and garnered a reputation as a competent lawyer, forensic speaker, and orator.

== Political career ==
A lifelong Democrat, Ross was a party manager and helped secure victories for Democratic nominees in the North Texas area. He was frequently a delegate to Democratic state conventions, having attended all but two between 1884 and 1897. He served in various positions within the party. The Dallas Morning News described Ross as a "free silver Democrat."

In 1895, Ross was nominated at the convention to be the Democratic candidate for district 3 of the Texas Senate and was easily won the election to represent the district, succeeding Edwin L. Agnew. The district included Lamar and Fannin County. Ross served on several committees and was chairman of the Committee on General Land Office. He introduced several bills he had mentioned as part of his platform, including a bill to standardize textbooks in Texas public schools. His tenure was part of the 25th and 26th Texas legislatures, spanning from January 12, 1897, to January 8, 1901. Ross was succeeded by Charles Allen Wheeler.

== Death ==
Ross died on October 10, 1933, at the age of 70.
