= Daniel Alders =

American politician

- Alders in 2026

Member of the Texas House of Representatives from the 6th district
- Incumbent
- Assumed office January 14, 2025
- Preceded by: Matt Schaefer

Personal details
- Born: November 14, 1986 (age 39)
- Party: Republican
- Spouse: Joanna
- Education: New Saint Andrews College (BA)
- Occupation: Businessman
- Website: https://danielalders.com/

Daniel Alders is an American politician who represents the 6th district in the Texas House of Representatives. A member of the Republican Party, he succeeded Matt Schaefer. Alders is the President of Drake Management Services, a commercial property management company in Tyler.

Texas House of Representatives
Preceded by Matt Schaefer	Member of the Texas House of Representatives from the 6th district 2025–present	Incumbent
