= B. B. Sturgeon =

American politician

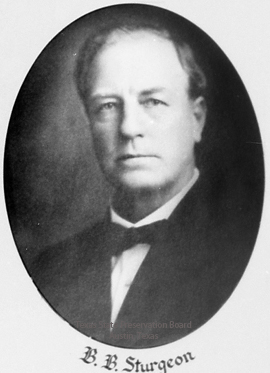

Member of the Texas Senate from the 3rd district
- In office January 12, 1909 – January 21, 1913
- Preceded by: A. P. Barrett
- Succeeded by: Flavius M. Gibson

Personal details
- Born: Benjamin Blufford Sturgeon; August 24, 1856
- Died: January 21, 1931 (aged 74)
- Party: Democratic

Benjamin Blufford Sturgeon (August 24, 1856 – January 21, 1931) was a Texas legislator who served in the Texas Senate for district 3, which at the time was composed of Lamar County and Fannin County.

== Personal life ==
Sturgeon was born on August 24, 1856, and died on January 21, 1931.

== Political career ==
He served on term in the Texas Senate for district 3, composed Lamar and Fannin County. He was a Democrat.
