= William Henry Pope (Texas politician) =

American politician (1847–1913)

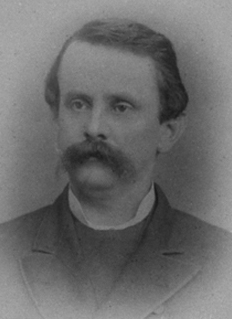

Member of the Texas Senate from the 3rd district
- In office January 10, 1883 – January 10, 1893
- Preceded by: Richard M. Wynne
- Succeeded by: E.L. Agnew
President pro tempore
President pro tempore of the Texas Senate
In office January 11, 1887 – March 9, 1887
Preceded by	Constantine Kilgore
Succeeded by	Caleb Garrison

Personal details
- Born: February 15, 1847 Washington, Georgia, U.S.
- Died: February 15, 1913 (aged 66) Waco, Texas, U.S.
- Resting place: Marshall, Texas
- Party: Democratic
- Spouse: Fannie Stedman (m. 1872)
- Children: 4
- Education: Marshall University; University of Virginia

Military service
- Allegiance: Confederate States
- Battles/wars: American Civil War

William Henry Pope (February 15, 1847 – February 15, 1913) was an American soldier, lawyer, and State Senator from Texas district 3. Pope was influential in writing and passing Texas Jim Crow laws and described himself as the "Jim Crow Senator".

== Personal life ==
William Henry Pope was born on February 15, 1847, in Washington, Georgia, to Alexander and Sarah "Willie" Pope. Him and his family moved to Marshall, Texas, in 1858. He attended Marshall University before enrolling in the Confederate Army in the winter of 1863. He served as a scout for in Terry's Texas Rangers until the end of the American Civil War. He then studied law at the University of Virginia. In 1872, he married Fannie Stedman, whom he had 4 children with.

=== Death ===
Pope died on his 66th birthday on February 15, 1913, in a Waco hospital of uremic poisoning, his resting place is in Marshall, Texas.

== Political career ==
Pope was first elected as Harris county attorney in 1869, he failed to be reelected in 1870. He was reelected as Harris county attorney in 1876 and 1878. He then served 10 years in the Texas Senate representing district 3. He often referred to himself as a "Jim Crow Senator". In 1889, Pope authored a law that required African Americans and White Americans to sit in separate coaches. He also appointed by Governor Lawrence Ross to serve as a special agent to the United States Congress to push agendas, he was in Washington, D.C., for 4 years. In 1902, Pope was elected judge of the Fifty-eighth Judicial District. He was affiliated with the Democratic Party.

Preceded by Richard M. Wynne	Texas State Senator from District 3 (Marshall); 1883–1893	Succeeded by Edwin L. Agnew
