= Bill Haley (Texas politician) =

American politician (1943–2022)

Member of the Texas Senate from the 3rd district
- In office January 10, 1989 – January 10, 1995
- Preceded by: Roy Blake, Sr.
- Succeeded by: Drew Nixon

Member of the Texas House of Representatives
- In office January 11, 1983 – January 10, 1989
- Preceded by: Smith Gilley
- Succeeded by: Jerry Johnson
- Constituency: 10th district
- In office March 1, 1978 – January 11, 1983
- Preceded by: Roy Blake Sr.
- Succeeded by: Gordon Arnold Jr.
- Constituency: 4th district

Personal details
- Born: James William Haley; September 22, 1943 Center, Texas, U.S.
- Died: July 3, 2022 (aged 78) Austin, Texas, U.S.
- Party: Democratic
- Education: Stephen F. Austin State University (BA); Texas Christian University; Texas State University (MA)
- Occupation: Teacher; Politician

James William Haley (September 22, 1943—July 3, 2022) was a Texas politician and teacher that was a member of the Texas House of Representatives for District 10, and was a member of the Texas Senate representing District 3. He was affiliated with the Democratic Party.

== Personal life ==
Haley was born September 22, 1943, in Center, Texas. He graduated with a degree in history and government from Texas Christian University. He also obtained a bachelor's degree in teaching from Stephen F. Austin State University and later a Master of Arts from Texas State University. He taught for a total of twelve and a half years, including in Houston and Center. He is a member of the Christian Church (Disciples of Christ) and resided near Austin, Texas.

== Political career ==
Haley was sworn in on March 1, 1978, to represent District 4 in the Texas House of Representatives after the resignation of Roy Blake Sr. He continued to serve district 4 through January 11, 1983. Haley began to represent Texas House District 10 on January 11, 1983. In his tenure he was crucial in enacting several reforms to the Texas education system, he chaired the House Committee on Public Education in the 68th, 69th, and 70th legislatures. Additionally, he served on the House Committees on State Affairs and Financial Institutions. He served in the Texas House of Representatives 1978–1988. In 1989 Haley became a member of the Texas Senate representing District 3, he served through 1995. Haley throughout his political career was a Democrat.

Throughout Haleys political career serving in the Texas legislatures he was given several honors and awards.

== Death ==
Haley died on July 3, 2022, at the age of 78, in Austin. His funeral was held at the University Christian Church in Austin and he is buried at the Texas State Cemetery.

Political offices
Preceded by Roy Blake Sr.	Texas State Senate for District 3 January 10, 1989 – January 10, 1995	Succeeded by Drew Nixon
Preceded by Smith Gilley	Texas House of Representatives for District 10; January 11, 1983 – January 10, 1989	Succeeded by Jerry Johnson
Preceded by Roy Blake Sr.	Texas House of Representatives for District 4 March 1, 1978 – January 11, 1983	Succeeded by Gordon Arnold Jr.
