= Keith Bell (American politician) =

American businessman and politician

Member of the Texas House of Representatives from the 4th district
- Incumbent
- Assumed office January 8, 2019
- Preceded by: Lance Gooden

Personal details
- Born: Gregory Keith Bell; June 22, 1962 (age 64)
- Party: Republican
- Spouse: Annette Bell
- Children: 2
- Education: Dallas Baptist University
- Occupation: Businessman
- Website: www.bellfortexas.com

Gregory Keith Bell (born June 22, 1962) is an American businessman and politician. A Republican, he was first elected in 2018 to represent the 4th District in the Texas House of Representatives. Bell assumed office on January 8, 2019. He succeeded fellow Republican Lance Gooden, who was instead elected to the United States House of Representatives. Prior to winning election to the Texas House, Bell was the president of the Forney, Texas, school board.

Texas House of Representatives
Preceded by Lance Gooden	Member of the Texas House of Representatives from the 4th district 2019–present	Incumbent
