= Matt Schaefer =

American lawyer, Naval officer, and politician

Member of the Texas House of Representatives from the 6th district
- In office January 8, 2013 – January 14, 2025
- Preceded by: Leo Berman
- Succeeded by: Daniel Alders

Personal details
- Born: Matthew Ray Schaefer; February 11, 1976 (age 50)
- Party: Republican
- Spouse: Jasilyn
- Education: Cisco College; Texas Tech University (BS, JD)

Military service
- Branch/service: United States Navy
- Unit: United States Navy Reserve

Matthew Ray Schaefer (born February 11, 1976) is an American attorney and politician, who is a former member of the Texas House of Representatives for the 6th district. A Republican, during his tenure, Schaefer was assigned to the Licensing and Administrative Procedures Committee and the Public Education Committee.

He ran without Democratic opposition in his successful bid for a fourth legislative term in the general election held on November 6, 2018. Schaefer defeated Neal Katz, an independent, 37,056 (75.6 percent) to 11,929 (24.4 percent).

== Early life and education ==
Schaefer attended Cisco College in Cisco, Texas, where he played football. Then he attended Texas Tech University in Lubbock, where he obtained a bachelor's degree in finance and a Juris Doctor from Texas Tech University School of Law.

== Career ==
In 1999, he worked in a district office of U.S. Senator Phil Gramm. Upon Gramm's retirement, Schaefer joined the United States Navy Reserve and attended law school at Texas Tech University. He retired from the Navy Reserve as a lieutenant commander (O-4), the equivalent of a major in other branches of the U.S. Armed Forces. Schaefer subsequently served as counsel to the chairman of the Sunset Advisory Commission, state representative Carl Isett, on bills regarding insurance and transportation.

== Texas House of Representatives ==
Schafer was first elected to the Texas House of Representatives in November 2012. In the 2012 primary election, he successfully challenged incumbent representative Leo Berman. Schaeffer unseated Berman in the Republican primary election held on May 29, 2012. He received 11,138 votes, or 57.7 percent, to Berman's 8,172 votes (42.3 percent). Schaefer won renomination for a second term in the March 2014 Republican primary. He defeated Tyler businessman Skip M. Ogle, 9,888, or 61.1%, to 6,304, or 38.3%.

In 2019, following two mass shootings in Texas, Schaefer tweeted his opposition to increasing gun restrictions such as universal background checks, bans on assault weapons and high-capacity magazine purchases, and mandatory gun buybacks. Instead, he advocates for prayer and discipline in the home, as well as the right to carry for law-abiding single mothers.

Schaefer supports a ban on Democrats being given committee chairmanships as long as the Republicans hold the majority of seats in the Texas House.

On May 27, 2023, Schaefer voted against impeaching Attorney General Ken Paxton.

In August 2023, Schaefer announced that he would not run for re-election in 2024. He was succeeded by Republican Daniel Alders.

== Personal life ==
Schaefer attends Green Acres Baptist Church, at which he met his wife in 2001.

Texas House of Representatives
Preceded by Leo Berman	Member of the Texas House of Representatives from the 6th district 2013–2025	Succeeded by Daniel Alders
