= Texas Oil and Gas Association =

The Texas Oil and Gas Association (TXOGA) is a industry group representing the petroleum and natural gas industries in Texas. Texas is the biggest producer of fossil fuels in the United States, account for 41% of crude oil production, 25% of natural gas, and 31% of refining capacity.

Formed in 1919, the association had 5000 members as of 2020.

== Positions ==
=== Climate change ===
In an April 2020 statement by association head Todd Staples, the group acknowledged the existence of global warming and the fossil fuel industry's role in it. This is a surprising reversal for Staples, who was previously part of coalitions attempting to block regulations on greenhouse gas emissions. The local public radio station KUT attributed to this change in position to an attempt to stay in line with American Petroleum Institute attempts to focus on Carbon capture and storage instead of climate change mitigation practices which shift away from a petroleum economy.
