= Charles Allen Wheeler =

American lawyer and legislator

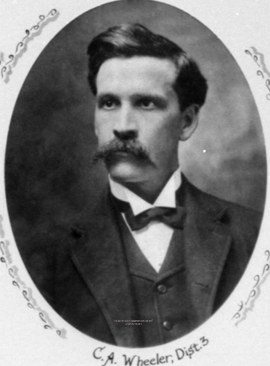

Member of the Texas Senate from the 3rd district
- In office January 8, 1901 – January 13, 1903
- Preceded by: Robert L. Ross
- Succeeded by: Travis Clack Henderson

Personal details
- Born: January 23, 1861 Barren County, Kentucky, U.S.
- Died: October 20, 1932 (aged 71)
- Party: Democratic
- Occupation: Lawyer

Charles Allen Wheeler (January 23, 1861—October 20, 1932) was an American lawyer and legislator who served in the Texas Senate for district 3.

== Background ==
Wheeler was born on January 23, 1861, in Barren County, Kentucky. He was a lawyer and member of the Odd fellows. He married on November 7, 1892.

A Democrat, Wheeler represented district 3 in the Texas Senate during the 27th legislature. At the time, the district was composed of Fannin County and Lamar County.
