= James W. Motley =

19th-century Texas legislator and doctor

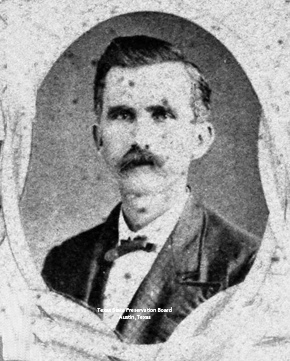

Member of the Texas Senate from the 3rd district
- In office April 18, 1876 – January 11, 1881
- Preceded by: James Eldrage Dillard
- Succeeded by: Richard M. Wynne

Personal details
- Born: September 3, 1836 Autauga County, Alabama, U.S.
- Died: June 4, 1887 (aged 50)
- Party: Democratic
- Spouse: Annie Henderson
- Children: 6
- Education: University of Louisville
- Occupation: Physician; legislator; farmer (Note: In the 1870 census, it was listed that Motley was a farmer.)

James W. Motley (September 3, 1836—June 4, 1887) was an American legislator and medical doctor who represented district 3 of the Texas Senate during the 15th and 16th legislatures. At the time, district 3 was composed of Panola, Rusk, and Shelby County.

== Early life ==
Motley was born on September 3, 1836, in Autauga County, Alabama. (Note: It has also been reported that Motley was born in 1839 and is from North Carolina.) At the age of ten, he moved to Texas, settling in Harrison County. In the spring of 1858, Motley graduated from the medical department of the University of Louisville in Kentucky, and subsequently moved to Rusk County, Texas and established a medical practice in May 1858. During the entirety of the American Civil War, Motley was surgeon for the Confederate Army.

== Texas Senate ==
Prior to his election to the Texas Senate, Motley had never held public office.

Motley, a Democrat, was elected by a large margin to represent district 3 of the Texas Senate on February 15, 1876, defeating Republican nominee A. D. Lindsley. The district was composed of Panola, Rusk, and Shelby County, and he served from April 18, 1876, to January 11, 1881.

== Personal life ==
Motley was a resident of Overton, Texas and was Methodist. He married Annie Henderson, the daughter of a local minister, not long after the Civil War. They had six children together; one of whom, Robert Motley, was the mayor of Overton.

He was a Master of the Millville Lodge of Free Masons, as well as a Master of the Millville Lodge of Grangers and Rusk County Council.

He died on June 4, 1887.
