= Richard M. Wynne =

Texan Confederate lieutenant and career politician (1844–1912)

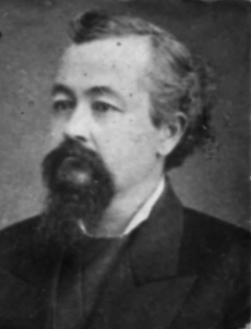

Member of the Texas Senate from the 3rd district
- In office January 11, 1881 – January 9, 1883
- Preceded by: James W. Motley
- Succeeded by: William Henry Pope

Personal details
- Born: June 2, 1844 Haywood County, Tennessee, U.S.
- Died: July 15, 1912 (aged 68) Austin, Texas, U.S.
- Resting place: Fort Worth, Texas
- Party: Democratic
- Spouse: Laura B. Kelly (m. 1867)
- Children: 4
- Occupation: Politician; lawyer; soldier

Military service
- Allegiance: Confederate States
- Rank: Lieutenant
- Unit: Tenth Texas Regiment
- Battles/wars: American Civil War

Richard M. Wynne (June 2, 1844 – July 15, 1912) was a Texas politician and lawyer who served in the Texas Senate for the 3rd district from 1881 to 1883. At the time, the 3rd district was composed of Panola, Rusk, and Shelby County.

== Early life and military background ==
Richard M. Wynne was born on June 2, 1844, in Haywood County, Tennessee to William Benjamin and Sarah Anne (née Moore) Wynne. Shortly after his birth, the family relocated to Rusk, Texas and Wynne attended Bellevue public schools. Wynne had a modest upbringing; he worked the family farm and only attended school in the winter after all the crops were gathered. This was his only formal education.

Wynne was a lieutenant in the Tenth Texas Regiment during the United States Civil War after enlisting in 1861. At battle in Nashville and Murfreesboro, Wynne was wounded and was taken as a prisoner of war; he was held in northern prison camps for the remainder of the war and was released in the winter of 1865.

== Political career ==
In 1866, Wynne was elected a county sheriff, likely of Rusk County, Texas. He served the position for three years.

A Democrat, Wynne was elected to the Texas Senate in 1880 to represent the third district. At the time, the district was composed of Panola, Rusk, and Shelby County. He was sworn in on January 11, 1881, succeeding James W. Motley. As a senator, Wynne supported the establishment of the Railroad Commission of Texas and served on the committee that established the University of Texas. He left office on January 9, 1883, being succeeded by William Henry Pope.

In 1882, Wynne had an unsuccessful bid for attorney general. In 1886, he became the permanent president of the state Democratic convention. The Democratic executive committee of Tarrant County endorsed Wynne as a candidate for nomination to be governor of Texas. Though he won delegates in every county, Wynne was unsuccessful in becoming the nominee.

== Personal life ==
Wynne was a Presbyterian. On January 23, 1867, Wynne married Laura B. Kelly, with whom he would have four children.

In 1870, Wynne learned law and was admitted into the bar, practicing law in Henderson, Texas. In A Twentieth Century History and Biographical Record of North and West Texas, he was described as a "prominent lawyer" who had "brilliant ability as a legal practitioner."

Shortly after his attorney general bid, Wynne moved to Fort Worth, Texas. He died on July 15, 1912, at the age of 68, in Austin, and his final resting place is in Fort Worth.
