= Joanne Shofner =

American politician (born 1964)

Member of the Texas House of Representatives from the 11th district
- Incumbent
- Assumed office January 14, 2025
- Preceded by: Travis Clardy

Personal details
- Born: September 28, 1964 (age 62)
- Party: Republican
- Spouse: David
- Education: University of Houston
- Occupation: Business owner; life coach

Joanne Shofner (born September 28, 1964) is the representative for district 11 of the Texas House of Representatives. She unseated incumbent Travis Clardy in the 2024 Republican primary.

== Texas House of Representatives ==
=== 2024 election ===
Shofner, who had served as president of the Nacogdoches County Republican Party, challenged Representative Travis Clardy in a contentious Republican primary. Clardy was an incumbent six-term representative who was elected to office in 2012, but had struck ire with the most conservative factions of the Texas Republican Party over his opposition to school vouchers. Shofner had accused Clardy of being "unloyal to the conservative party" and stood behind voucher programs, which was the most prominent distinction between the candidates. Pro-voucher special interest groups funded efforts to support Shofner's campaign and attack Clardy. She was endorsed by Texas Governor Greg Abbott, Donald Trump, and Senator Ted Cruz. Shofner defeated Clardy in the primary with over 60% of the vote.

In the solidly Republican district, no candidate filed to run as a Democrat, and Shofner was elected in November 2024, and assumed office in January 2025.

== Personal life ==
Shofner is a seventh-generation Texan and a small business owner. She is a Christian life coach for women in recovery from trauma. She holds a degree from the University of Houston in hotel and restaurant management and previously was a manager for Hyatt Hotels.

Texas House of Representatives
Preceded by Travis Clardy	Member of the Texas House of Representatives from the 11th district 2025–present	Incumbent
