= Leo Berman =

American politician

Member of the Texas House of Representatives from the 6th district
- In office January 12, 1999 – January 8, 2013
- Preceded by: Ted Andrew Kamel
- Succeeded by: Matt Schaefer

Personal details
- Born: October 21, 1935 New York City USA
- Died: May 23, 2015 (aged 79) Tyler, Texas
- Party: Republican
- Spouse: Lou Ann Kuck Berman
- Children: Five children
- Education: Southern Methodist University
- Occupation: Retired military officer businessman (2) Tyler; Smith County, Texas

Leo Berman (October 21, 1935 – May 23, 2015) was an American businessman, military officer, and politician from Tyler, Texas, who was a Republican member of the Texas House of Representatives for District 6 in Smith County from 1999 to 2013. He was first elected in the general election held in November 1998. In January 2011, Berman announced a challenge to Speaker Joe Straus of San Antonio for the presiding officer's position but subsequently withdrew from the race. Though Representative Warren Chisum of Pampa filed his candidacy for Speaker, Straus was handily re-elected to a second term in the leadership in January 2011.

Berman obtained a Bachelor of Arts in Political Science from Southern Methodist University. He died in Tyler on May 23, 2015.

Texas House of Representatives
Preceded by Ted Andrew Kamel	Texas State Representative for District 6 (Smith County); Leo C. Berman; 1999–2013	Succeeded by Matt Schaefer
