= Julius Otto Duncan =

American politician (1926–2023)

Julius Ottis Duncan

Member of the Texas House of Representatives from the 4th district
- In office January 9, 1951 – January 13, 1953
- Preceded by: Surry Turner
- Succeeded by: Reagan R. Huffman

Personal details
- Born: Julius Ottis Duncan Jr. October 28, 1926 Dike, Texas, U.S.
- Died: November 7, 2023 (aged 97) Austin, Texas, U.S.
- Party: Democratic
- Education: Kilgore Junior College; Southern Methodist University

Julius Ottis Duncan Jr. (October 28, 1926 – November 7, 2023) was an American politician. He served as a Democratic member for the 4th district of the Texas House of Representatives.

== Life and career ==
Julius Otto Duncan was born in Dike, Texas, on October 28, 1926, the son of Julius Otto Duncan Sr. and Mozelle Lundy. He attended East Mountain High School, graduating in 1944. He also attended Kilgore Junior College and Southern Methodist University. He was a decorated World War II and Korean War veteran.

Duncan served in the Texas House of Representatives from 1951 to 1953.

Duncan died on November 7, 2023 in Austin, Texas, at the age of 97. He was buried in Texas State Cemetery.
