= Roy Blake Sr. =

American politician

Member of the Texas Senate from the 3rd district
- In office February 28, 1978 – January 10, 1989
- Preceded by: Don Adams
- Succeeded by: Bill Haley
President pro tempore
President pro tempore of the Texas Senate
In office June 1, 1987 – July 21, 1987
Preceded by	Carl A. Parker
Succeeded by	John N. Leedom

Member of the Texas House of Representatives from the 4th district
- In office January 9, 1973 – January 10, 1978
- Preceded by: Steve Burgess
- Succeeded by: Bill Haley

Nacogdoches City Commission
- In office 1965–1971

Personal details
- Born: Roy Morris Blake; March 29, 1928 Nacogdoches, Texas, U.S.
- Died: March 4, 2017 (aged 88) Nacogdoches, Texas, U.S.
- Resting place: Sunset Memorial Park, Nacogdoches, Texas
- Party: Democratic
- Spouse: Mae Deanne Goodwin (m. 1949; died 2012)
- Children: 5, including Roy Jr.
- Education: Stephen F. Austin State University; Texas A&M University

Military service
- Allegiance: United States
- Branch/service: United States Navy
- Battles/wars: World War II

Roy Morris Blake Sr. (March 29, 1928 – March 4, 2017) was a Texas politician and businessman from Nacogdoches, Texas. He served in the Texas House of Representatives from the 4th District. He also served in the Texas Senate from the 3rd district, and was president pro tempore of the Texas Senate in the Seventieth Texas Legislature.

== Personal life ==
Roy Morris Blake was born on March 29, 1928, in Nacogdoches, Texas, to Lynn T. and Pattie Lee Hall Blake, he was the youngest of 6 children. In 1945, he graduated from Nacogdoches High School, and then attended Texas A&M University for 1 year before enrolling in the US Navy to fight in World War II. After returning to Nacogdoches he began to attend Stephen F. Austin State University where he graduated in 1950. On June 28, 1949, he married Mae Deanne Goodwin, they had 5 children together. One of their children is Republican Representative Roy Blake Jr. Blake was a member of First United Methodist Church Nacogdoches. Mae Deanne Blake died on April 24, 2012.

Blake died on March 4, 2017, at his home in Nacogdoches, Texas, at the age 88; he was under hospice care. His funeral was held at First United Methodist Church Nacogdoches, and was officiated by Dr. Jeff McDonald. Blake is buried at Sunset Memorial Park in Nacogdoches, Texas.

== Career ==
=== Political ===
Blake began his political career by being elected to the Nacogdoches City Commission in 1965, he served 6 years or 3 terms on the commission. Blake was sworn in to represent Texas House of Representatives, District 4 on January 9, 1973. Blake was a strong proponent of local governments throughout his career, and earned recognition from Texas Municipal League. Blake was elected to Texas Senate, District 3 and was sworn in on Feb 28, 1978. While in the senate he was on several committees such as the Senate Administration Committee. Blake was president pro tempore of the Texas Senate during the Seventieth Texas Legislature. Blake was a Democrat.

=== Business ===
Blake founded the Roy Blake Insurance in 1963.

Political offices
Preceded by Carl A. Parker	President pro tempore of the Texas Senate; January 13, 1987 – June 1, 1987	Succeeded by John N. Leedom
Preceded by Don Adams	Texas Senate from District 3 February 28, 1978 – January 10, 1989	Succeeded by Bill Haley
Preceded by Steve A. Burgess	Texas House of Representatives from District 4 January 9, 1973 – January 10, 1978	Succeeded by Bill Haley
Preceded by	Nacogdoches City Commission; 1965–1971	Succeeded by
