= A. P. Barrett =

American politician (1878–1953)

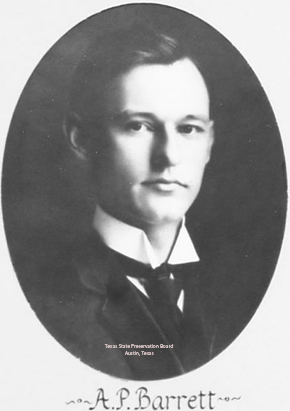

Member of the Texas Senate from the 3rd district
- In office January 10, 1905 – January 12, 1909
- Preceded by: Travis Clack Henderson
- Succeeded by: B. B. Sturgeon
President pro tempore
President pro tempore of the Texas Senate
In office April 12, 1907 – May 11, 1907
| Preceded by | McDonald Meachum |
| Succeeded by | B. F. Looney |

Member of the Texas House of Representatives from the 34th district
- In office January 13, 1903 – January 10, 1905
- Preceded by: John Cunningham
- Succeeded by: Rosser Thomas

Personal details
- Born: Alva Pearl Barrett; April 12, 1878 Milan, Tennessee, U.S.
- Died: March 23, 1953 (aged 74) Fort Worth, Texas, U.S.
- Resting place: Mission Burial Park South, San Antonio, Texas
- Party: Democratic
- Education: University of Texas (LL.B)
- Occupation: Politician; businessman; attorney

Alva Pearl Barrett (April 12, 1878 – March 23, 1953) was a Texas politician and businessman. He served in the Texas legislature between 1903 and 1909.

Born in Tennessee, Barrett moved to Texas in 1892. He served in the Texas House of Representatives and Texas Senate representing his home town of Bonham from the 28th to 30th legislature. Upon graduating from the University of Texas in 1906, he would become a practicing attorney. However, in the 1920s he would shift his career to business and founded several companies. One of his companies, Southern Air Transport, would eventually become American Airlines.

== Early life ==
On April 12, 1878, Alva Pearl Barrett was born to Amelia Burns Barrett (1856–1917) and Marcus Lafayette Barrett (1855–1943) in Milan, Tennessee. The family moved to Bonham, Texas, on January 1, 1892, from Milan by train. Before his father moved to Texas, he was an ordained minister of Primitive Baptist Church and a farmer. Once moving to Texas his father became the pastor of Philadelphia Primitive Baptist Church, which was ten miles southeast of Bonham, Texas. The Barrett family also bought a cotton farm upon arrival in Texas. A. P. Barrett had 7 siblings and he and his brothers helped maintain the family farm. He and his brothers also built a "one-room bachelors quarters" near their home and traveled on horseback selling clothes pins and other home utilities across the countryside for money.

== Career ==
At age 19, Barrett began teaching at Prairie View school, which was a one-room school. He obtained a bachelors of law from the University of Texas in 1906. He was a practicing attorney in San Antonio from 1908 to 1918.

=== Business ===
In the 1920s, Barrett became involved with the oil boom in Ranger, Texas. During this time he acquired and formed many businesses, including the Texas-Louisiana Power Company. Through the power company, Barrett was able to meet and hire C. R. Smith, whom at the time was a young accountant. In 1928, Barrett purchased Texas Air Transport and named Smith as the secretary and treasurer of the firm. Texas Air Transport would later be absorbed with Southern Air Transport (SAT), which Barrett founded himself. That same year, SAT became part of Aviation Corporation (AVCO) and would ultimately become American Airlines, which is now one of the largest airlines in the world. Other business ventures by Barrett include Dixie Motor Coach and KTAT radio station.

=== Political ===
Barrett began his political career by serving in the Texas House of Representatives for district 34 during the 28th legislature (1903–1905), at the time the district was only composed of Fannin County. Once serving in the Texas House of Representatives, he served in the Texas Senate for district 3 during the 29th and 30th legislatures (1905–1909), the district composed of Fannin County and Lamar County. While in the Texas Senate, he served as president pro tempore from April 12, 1907, to May 11, 1907. He was a member of the Democratic Party.

== Later life ==
In 1930, following his many business ventures, Barrett purchased an estate in the Rivercrest addition of Fort Worth, where he built an airfield near the estate grounds.

Barrett died on March 23, 1953, in Fort Worth, at the age of 74. His final burial place is Mission Burial Park South in San Antonio, Texas.
