= Robert Nichols (politician) =

American politician

Member of the Texas Senate from the 3rd district
- Incumbent
- Assumed office January 9, 2007
- Preceded by: Todd Staples

President pro tempore of the Texas Senate
- In office May 29, 2017 – January 8, 2019
- Preceded by: Kel Seliger
- Succeeded by: Kirk Watson

Mayor of Jacksonville
- In office 1985–1989

Personal details
- Born: Robert Lee Nichols; November 25, 1944 (age 81)
- Party: Republican
- Spouse: Donna
- Children: 3
- Education: Lamar University (BS)

Robert Lee Nichols (born November 25, 1944) is an American politician who represents the 3rd District of the Texas Senate. A Republican, he was the senate president pro tempore of the 85th legislative session.

== Early years ==
Nichols graduated in 1968 from Lamar University in Beaumont, Texas, with a degree in industrial engineering. He had a career as a small businessman before being elected mayor of Jacksonville, Texas, and served as mayor 1985-1989.

== Public service ==
During his tenure as mayor, Nichols streamlined the city government and helped to cut property tax rates. His service as Mayor eventually convinced then-Governor of Texas George W. Bush to appoint him to a six-year term on the Texas Transportation Commission in 1997. Nichols was appointed again in 2003 by former Texas Governor Rick Perry, and continued to serve until he resigned to prepare for a bid for the Texas Senate in 2006.

In a 2023 analysis of voting records, Nichols was rated the least conservative Republican member of the state Senate.

Nichols announced he would not be seeking re-election in 2026. At the time, he was the most senior Republican in the state senate.

== 2006 and 2018 elections ==
Nichols faced stiff competition in 2006 from Republicans Bob Reeves of Center; David Kleimann of Willis; and Frank Denton of Conroe in the Republican primary. Nichols secured a 54% win, thus avoiding a runoff. Nichols' primary win was tantamount to winning the general election, as he did not have a Democratic candidate run against him in 2006.

In the general election of November 6, 2018, Nichols defeated the Democrat, Shirley Layton, and the Libertarian Party nominee, Bruce Quarels. Nichols received 214,756 votes (78.3 percent) to Layton's 56,274 (20.5 percent) and Quarles' 3,280 (1.2 percent).

Texas Senate
| Preceded by Todd Staples | Member of the Texas Senate from the 3rd district 2007–present | Incumbent |
| Preceded by Kel Seliger | President pro tempore of the Texas Senate; 2017–2019 | Succeeded by Kirk Watson |
