= Drew Nixon =

American politician (born 1959)

Member of the Texas Senate from the 3rd district
- In office January 10, 1995 – January 9, 2001
- Preceded by: Bill Haley
- Succeeded by: Todd Staples

Personal details
- Born: Drew Eldred Nixon; November 21, 1959 (age 66)
- Party: Republican
- Education: Stephen F. Austin State University

Drew Eldred Nixon (born November 21, 1959) is a former Republican Texas state senator from Carthage, the seat of Panola County in east Texas, who served from 1995 to 2001. He is largely known for a tabloid sex scandal.

After graduating from Carthage High School, Nixon attended Panola Junior College and Stephen F. Austin State University in Nacogdoches, where he graduated summa cum laude in 1982 with a Bachelor of Business Administration degree in accounting. Nixon is a Certified Public Accountant. On November 8, 1994, Nixon was elected to the Senate to represent the Third District. He was the first Republican to have served this district since Reconstruction. In the 74th Legislature, Nixon served on three committees: State Affairs, Health and Human Services, and Natural Resources Subcommittee on Agriculture.

During the 75th Legislature he served as the Vice-Chair of State Affairs and on Health and Human Services, Natural Resources Subcommittee on Water, Congressional/Legislative Redistricting, and Nominations Committees. During the 76th Legislature he served on Health Services, Intergovernmental Relations, and State Affairs Subcommittee on Infrastructure. Nixon supported business and economic development legislation and had interests in education and the criminal justice system. Nixon chose not to run for reelection in 2000.

== Scandals ==
=== 1993 arrest ===
In 1993 he was arrested for having a concealed, loaded .357 handgun in his car with three prostitutes.

=== 1997 arrest ===
Nixon was arrested again on February 18, 1997, after he offered $35 for oral sex and intercourse from an undercover Austin police woman posing as a prostitute. The arrest came during a sting in south Austin. After the senator was handcuffed, police found a loaded, 9 mm under the front seat of his car. He was charged with unlawful carrying of a weapon because he did not have a state permit to carry a concealed handgun.

Nixon pleaded guilty and despite former Democratic Lieutenant Governor Bob Bullock's testimony during sentencing that Nixon deserved leniency, the senator was sentenced to serve six months in jail. He was sentenced to two concurrent six-month sentences. Nixon remained a senator while he served his sentence on weekends.

=== 2007 arrest ===
In July 2007, Texas State Attorney General unsealed an indictment against Nixon in which he was charged with two counts of official oppression before the 2006 Panola County Fresh Water Supply District board elections. Nixon, an accountant who served as an informal district election administrator, is accused of trying to keep two prospective candidates off the ballot. According to the Attorney General's press release regarding the indictment, Nixon allegedly attempted to keep the two candidates off the ballot on the basis that neither resided in the proper district.

Texas Senate
Preceded by Bill Haley	Texas State Senator from District 3 (Carthage); 1995–2001	Succeeded by Todd Staples
