= Don Adams (politician) =

American politician (born 1938)

Member of the Texas Senate from the 3rd district
- In office January 9, 1973 – December 31, 1977
- Preceded by: Charlie Wilson
- Succeeded by: Roy Blake, Sr.
President pro tempore
President pro tempore of the Texas Senate
In office March 30, 1977 – July 11, 1977
Preceded by	Betty Andujar
Succeeded by	Peyton McKnight

Member of the Texas House of Representatives from the 7th district
- In office January 14, 1969 – January 9, 1973
- Preceded by: J.E. Miller
- Succeeded by: Terry Doyle

Personal details
- Born: Donald Gilbert Adams; December 18, 1938 (age 87) Jasper, Texas, U.S.
- Party: Democratic
- Spouse(s): Linda Cullum (m. 1962/1963; died 2015)
- Children: 3
- Education: Baylor University (BBA, LLB)
- Occupation: Politician; attorney; lobbyist

Donald Gilbert Adams (born December 18, 1938) is an American politician, attorney, and lobbyist who was president pro tempore of the Texas Senate, and a member of the Texas Senate, District 3. He also served in the Texas House of Representatives for District 7.

== Personal life and education ==
Adams was born December 18, 1938, in Jasper, Texas, to T. Gilbert Adams and Dess Hart Adams. His father was a county judge. In 1963, Adams graduated from Baylor University with a Bachelor of Business Administration and Bachelor of Laws. After attending university, he practiced law in Lufkin, Texas, for two years before returning to Jasper where he formed a legal partnership with his father. He married Linda Cullum, and the couple had 3 children: Don Jr., Debra, and Dinah. Linda Adams died on October 6, 2015, after a struggle with Alzheimer's disease. They were married for 52 years.

== Political career ==
Adams represented District 7 of the Texas House of Representatives during the 61st and 62nd legislature. While being a freshman representative, Adams was selected to study the revision of Texas Penal Code. Adams then represented Texas Senate, District 3 during the 63rd, 64th, and 65th legislature. During part of the 65th Legislature Adams served as Ad Interim president pro tempore of the Texas Senate. While serving in the Texas Senate, Adams was chairman of the Texas Industrial Council and the Texas Aircraft Pooling Board. He also served as vice chairman of the Texas Cancer Council. After retiring from the Texas Legislatures he became a lobbyist. Throughout his career Adams was affiliated with the Democratic Party.

Preceded by Betty Andujar	President pro tempore of the Texas Senate; March 30, 1977 – July 11, 1977	Succeeded by Peyton McKnight
Preceded by Charlie Wilson	Texas Senate from District 3 January 9, 1973 – December 31, 1977	Succeeded by Roy Blake, Sr.
Preceded by J.E. Miller	Texas House of Representatives from District 7 January 14, 1969 – January 9, 1973	Succeeded by Terry Doyle
