= Roy Blake Jr. =

American politician

Member of the Texas House of Representatives from the 9th district
- In office January 11, 2005 – January 9, 2007
- Preceded by: Wayne Christian
- Succeeded by: Wayne Christian

Mayor of Nacogdoches
- In office 2001–2004

Chairman of Nacogdoches County Chamber of Commerce
- In office 1997–1999

Personal details
- Born: Roy Morris Blake Jr. February 5, 1956 (age 70)
- Party: Republican
- Spouse: Jocelyn
- Children: 3
- Parent: Roy Blake Sr. (father)
- Education: Stephen F. Austin State University

Roy Morris Blake Jr. (born February 5, 1956) was a Republican member of the Texas House of Representatives for district 9 during the Seventy-ninth Texas Legislature.

He is the son of Roy Blake Sr., who was a Democratic member of the Texas Senate and Texas House of Representatives.

== Personal life ==
Roy Morris Blake Jr. was born on February 5, 1956, to Roy Blake Sr. and Mae Deanne Goodwin Blake. He is a native of Nacogdoches County, Texas. He graduated from Nacogdoches High School and attended Stephen F. Austin State University where he received a bachelor's degree in public administration. He is married to his wife Jocelyn and they have 3 children. He is a member of the First United Methodist Church of Nacogdoches.

Blake runs Roy Blake Insurance Agency, which was founded by his father.

== Political career ==
Blake's first political office was chairman of the Nacogdoches County Chamber of Commerce from 1997 to 1999. Blake also served as mayor of Nacogdoches, Texas, from 2001 to 2004. Blake served in the Seventy-ninth Texas Legislature for Texas House of Representatives district 9. Blake is affiliated with the Republican Party.
