= Betty Andujar =

American politician (1912–1997)

Elizabeth Richards "Betty" Andujar

Texas State Senator for District 12 (Tarrant County)
- In office 1973–1983
- Preceded by: J. P. Word
- Succeeded by: Hugh Parmer

Texas Senate President Pro Tempore
- In office 1977–1977
- Preceded by: H. Tati Santiesteban
- Succeeded by: Don Adams

Personal details
- Born: November 6, 1912 Harrisburg, Pennsylvania, USA
- Died: June 8, 1997 (aged 84) Fort Worth, Tarrant County, Texas
- Resting place: Texas State Cemetery in Austin
- Party: Republican
- Spouse: Dr. John Jose Andujar (m. 1935)
- Parent(s): Karl E. and Katharine L. Beetem Richards
- Education: Wilson College
- Occupation: Homemaker

Elizabeth Richards Andujar (November 6, 1912 – June 8, 1997), was a homemaker, civic activist, and politician. She was the first Republican woman to be elected and serve in the Texas State Senate.

From 1973 to 1983, Andujar represented District 12 in Fort Worth, the seat of Tarrant County in North Texas.

In 1972 she was the first Republican elected from Tarrant County to the state legislature since the Reconstruction era.

== Background ==
The rise of the Republican Party since the late 20th century was the result of two forces: the civil rights movement having gained passage of the Voting Rights Act of 1965, which authorized the federal government to enforce constitutional rights of minority voters and resulted in black voters registering to vote in considerable numbers, and the shift of white conservative voters into the Republican Party after decades of affiliation with the Democratic Party.

At the turn of the century, the white Democrat-dominated legislature had disenfranchised most African Americans and Latinos. This disenfranchisement of major supporters weakened the Republican Party for decades; and the Democratic Party dominated. Since the late 20th century, the Republican Party has revived in Texas. It has a majority of white conservative members.

== Early years ==
Elizabeth Richards was born in Harrisburg, Pennsylvania, the state capital. Her parents were Katharine L. (Beetem) and Karl E. Richards, an attorney, who worked as first assistant to the county District Attorney. He became District Attorney in 1932 with service until 1937, when he was elected as Dauphin County's first Orphan's Court judge. He served as judge of this court until 1961. (According to information supplied by Andujar's family to the Texas State Cemetery, her father had served as the state's chief justice.)) Elizabeth Richards attended local schools and received a bachelor's degree from Wilson College.

== Marriage and family ==
In 1935, Richards married John José Andujar (January 26, 1912 – 2003), a young physician. Born in Chicago to an American mother and Spanish father, he had lived for years with his family in Puerto Rico. His mother, Lily Esther Kurzenknabe, was born in Harrisburg, Pennsylvania, to German-American parents. His father, Manuel Andujar y Agrelo, was born in Galicia, Spain. (One record of John's birth lists him as Canadian; perhaps his father had first gained citizenship there.) John Andujar was a United States citizen by virtue of birth and his mother's nationality. John was the third of four children. His father was a minister. According to the 1920 census, his family was living in Puerta De Tierra in San Juan, Puerto Rico. John Andujar earned a degree at Penn State Commonwealth College and received a M.D. from Temple Commonwealth University. He specialized in pathology at Cornell University and Sloan-Kettering.

Elizabeth and John Andujar moved to Fort Worth, Texas in 1937. He worked as chief pathologist at Carswell Air Force Base and the Navy's federal hospital near Fort Worth before becoming the chief pathologist at Harris Hospital, at which he directed the laboratory. He became a world leader in pathology, president of the American Board of Pathologists, and the first American president of the World Association Society of Pathologists. In 1969 he received the Gold-Headed Cane Award from the Tarrant County Medical Society.

== Civic life ==
Betty Andujar became active in the auxiliaries of the Texas state and Tarrant County medical associations. She later served on the boards of the Medical College of Pennsylvania and the Texas Rape Prevention and Control Project. She was active in the Association for the Prevention of Blindness and the American Cancer Society.

== Political career ==
When Andujar decided to get more involved in politics, she joined the Republican Party. It was rebuilding in Texas after having been hollowed out in the first half of the 20th century following state disenfranchisement of minorities; newly enfranchised freedmen had been strong supporters of the party across the South before they were excluded from politics by state barriers to voter registration. African Americans, who comprised the majority of the Republican Party in Texas in the 19th century, and many Hispanics were disenfranchised by laws passed by the white-Democratic dominated state legislature at the turn of the 20th century, which required payment of poll taxes and established white primaries that excluded minorities.

Andujar was elected in 1972 as the first Republican to represent Tarrant County in the state legislature since Reconstruction. Andujar's election was a sign of the changing demographics of the Republican Party as it was appealing to white conservatives in Texas and across the South in the middle to late 20th century.

It was unsuccessful, but Reagan later gained the Republican nomination and presidency.

In 1976, Andujar was elected as a Texas Republican national committeewoman, serving as a member of the Republican National Convention through 1982.

Although a conservative, Andujar in 1973 introduced a bill to remove prison terms for conviction of the possession of marijuana, claiming that it should be treated as a substance comparable to alcohol and regulated. The bill did not pass but she was ahead of her time: in the 21st century, this has become an increasingly popular view among law enforcement, physicians, and many citizens. Some states have legalized marijuana use for medical use, while others have also legalized it for recreational use regulated as if it were alcohol.

Andujar worked in the legislature to have the Texas College of Osteopathic Medicine incorporated into the University of North Texas Health Science Center. She introduced legislation requiring county coroners to be qualified pathologists. In keeping with her civic work on treatment for blindness, she sponsored bills to allow physicians in Texas to remove corneas from deceased persons to transplant to new patients for sight restoration. She also supported bills to assist women in the collection of child support.

Because of health issues, Andujar did not run for re-election in 1982. That year her husband Dr. John (Andy) Andujar ran for her seat in the State Senate. Texas Democrats swept all statewide offices that year, and John Andujar was defeated by Hugh Parmer, well known as the former mayor of Fort Worth. He held the seat until 1991.

== Legacy and honors ==
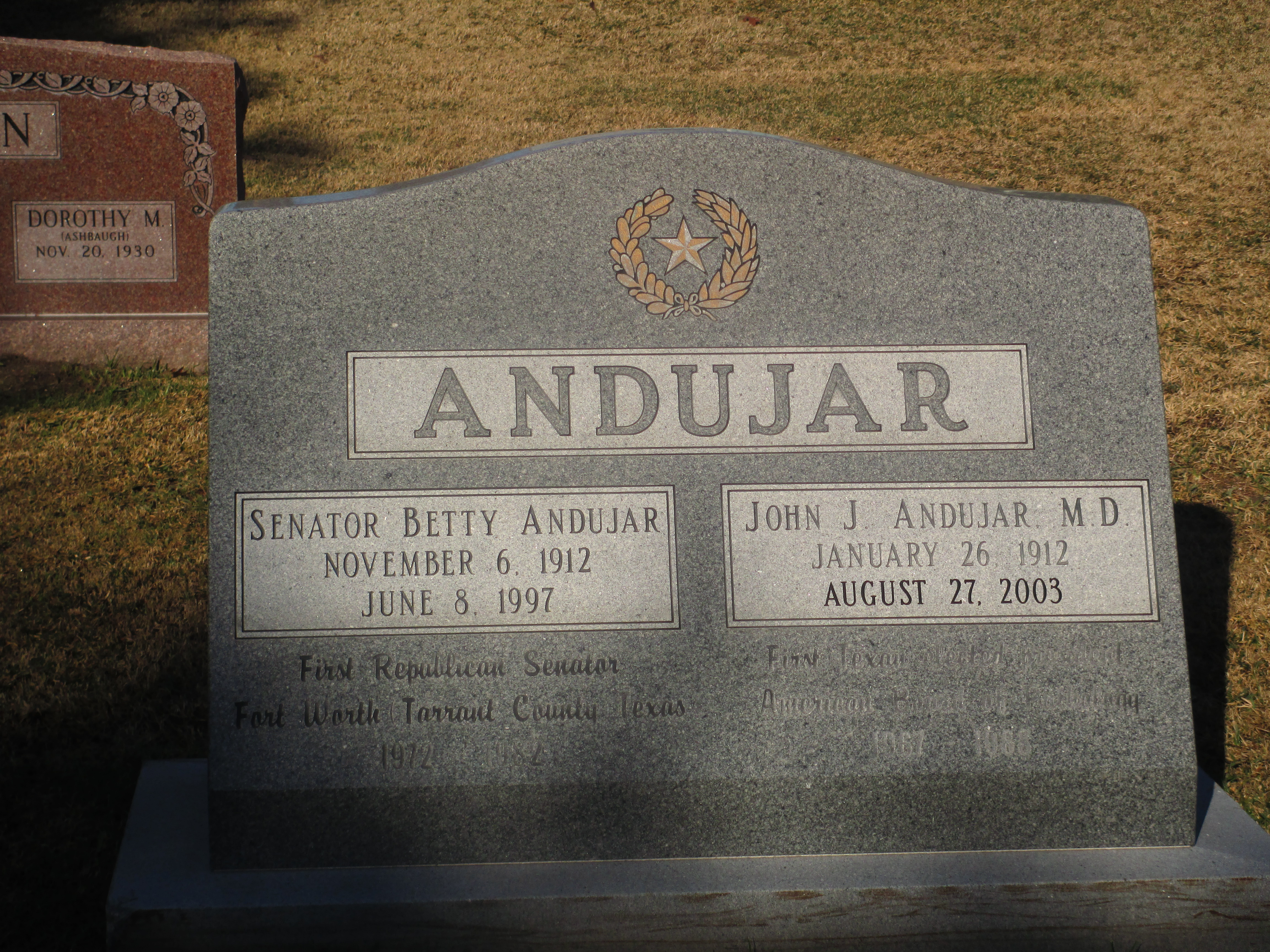
Grave at Texas State Cemetery

- Andujar was listed in Who's Who in American Politics.
- In 1972 she was among those receiving the title "Female Newsmaker of the Year".
- Andujar was the first layperson to receive the Citation of Merit Award from the Texas Society of Pathologists for her legislation requiring that county coroners be qualified pathologists.
- In 1988, the Andujars established the first permanent chair of pathology at the University of Texas Southwestern Medical Center in Dallas.

== Death ==
Betty Andujar died on June 8, 1997, and was survived by her husband. As a state senator, she was interred at the Texas State Cemetery in Austin. The widower later married Mary Parker. After his death in August 2003, he was buried by his request next to his first wife at the Texas State Cemetery.

Preceded by J. P. Word	Texas State Senator for District 12 (Tarrant County); 1973–1983	Succeeded by Hugh Parmer
Preceded by H. Tati Santiesteban	Texas State Senate President Pro Tempore; 1977	Succeeded by Don Adams
