= Lance Gooden =

American politician (born 1982)

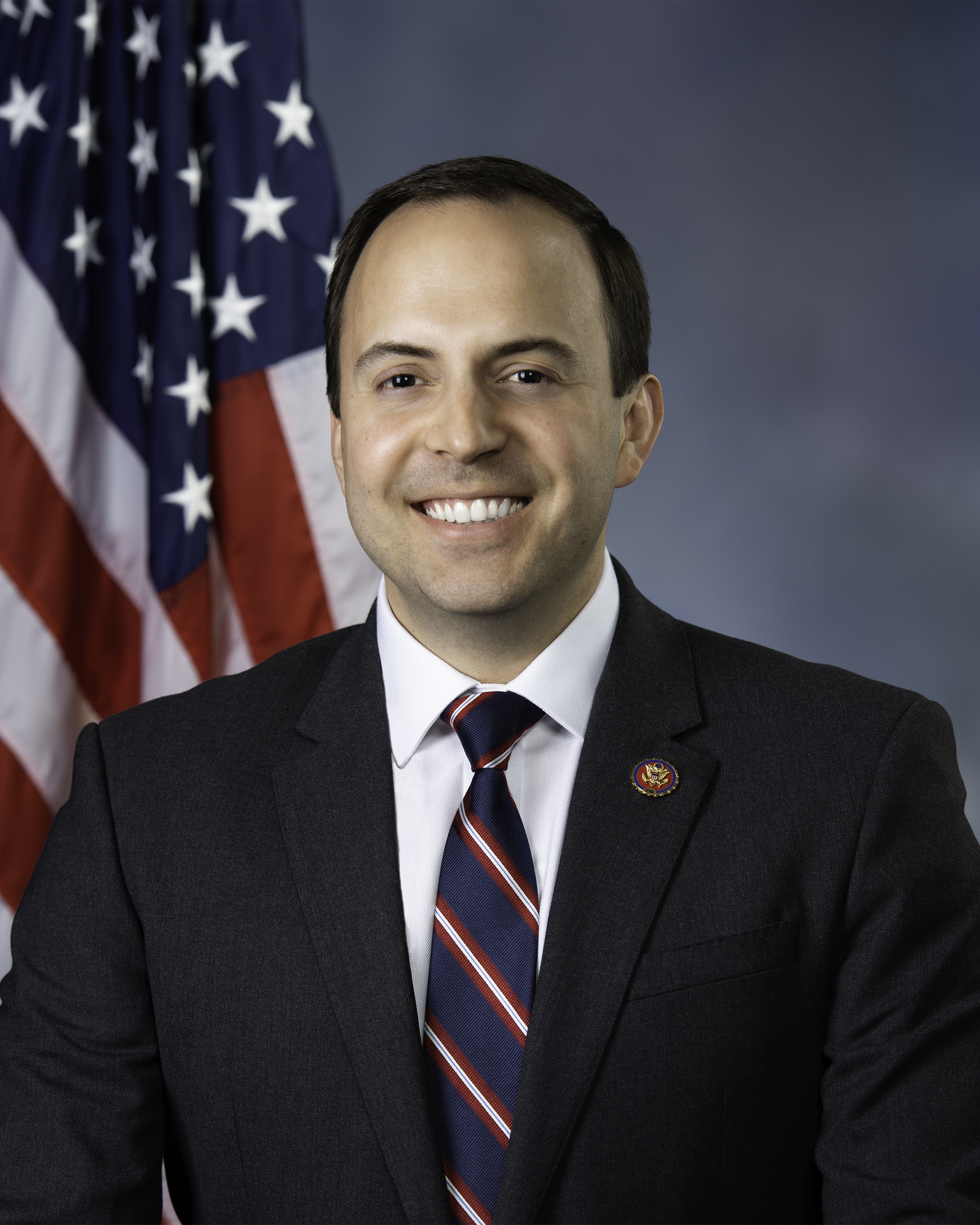
- Official portrait, 2019

Member of the U.S. House of Representatives from Texas's 5th district
- Incumbent
- Assumed office January 3, 2019
- Preceded by: Jeb Hensarling

Member of the Texas House of Representatives from the 4th district
- In office January 10, 2017 – January 3, 2019
- Preceded by: Stuart Spitzer
- Succeeded by: Keith Bell
- In office January 11, 2011 – January 13, 2015
- Preceded by: Betty Brown
- Succeeded by: Stuart Spitzer

Personal details
- Born: Lance Carter Gooden; December 1, 1982 (age 43) Nashville, Tennessee, U.S.
- Party: Republican
- Spouse: Alexa Calligas (m. 2016)
- Children: 2
- Education: University of Texas, Austin (BA, BBA)
- Website: House website Campaign website

Lance Carter Gooden (born December 1, 1982) is an American politician serving as the U.S. representative for Texas's 5th congressional district since 2019. His district includes parts of eastern Dallas, as well as a large swath of exurban and rural territory to Dallas's east.

A member of the Republican Party, Gooden served as the Texas State Representative for the 4th district (Henderson County and Kaufman County) from 2011 to 2015. He lost his reelection bid in the 2014 Republican primary election but was returned to office in the 2016 election for a non-consecutive third term in the state legislature before he ran for Congress.

== Early life and education ==
A native of Nashville, Tennessee, Gooden was raised in Terrell in Kaufman County, an eastern suburb of Dallas. Gooden graduated from the University of Texas at Austin, from which he received a Bachelor of Arts in government in 2001 at the age of 19 and a BBA in finance in 2004 at the age of 22.

== Texas House of Representatives ==
In the 2010 primary election, Gooden won 50.5% of the vote, upsetting six-term incumbent Republican Representative Betty Brown. Gooden had once been Brown's legislative assistant.

Upon taking office in 2011, Gooden worked on the state budget in an attempt to eliminate wasteful spending. He served on the House Appropriations, County Affairs, and House Administration committees, the last of which handles employment by the House. In 2010, Gooden did not have a Democratic opponent in his heavily Republican district. In 2011, Gooden assisted hotel mogul Monty Bennett in his fight against the Tarrant Regional Water District, pushing legislation to designate Bennett's 1,000-acre ranch as a municipal utility district and granting immunity from a proposed water pipeline through the property.

Gooden won renomination to a second term in the Republican primary on May 29, 2012. He polled 6,385 votes (53.5%) to his opponent Stuart Spitzer's 5,545 (46.5%). Gooden was unopposed for a second term in the November 6 general election. In 2014, Gooden again faced Spitzer for reelection, but this time lost to Spitzer in a close race.

Gooden staged a comeback and unseated Spitzer in the March 1, 2016 Republican primary with 14,500 votes (51.8%) to 13,502 (48.2%). He returned to the State House in January 2017.

== U.S. House of Representatives ==
=== Elections ===
==== 2018 ====
Gooden won the Republican nomination for the 5th congressional district and the November 6 general election, receiving 62.7% of the vote.

==== 2020 ====
Gooden was reelected on November 3, receiving 62% of the vote.

=== Tenure ===
==== 2020 election ====
In December 2020, Gooden was one of 126 Republican members of the House of Representatives to sign an amicus brief in support of Texas v. Pennsylvania, a lawsuit filed at the United States Supreme Court contesting the results of the 2020 presidential election, in which Joe Biden defeated incumbent Donald Trump. The Supreme Court declined to hear the case on the basis that Texas lacked standing under Article III of the Constitution to challenge the results of an election held by another state.

House Speaker Nancy Pelosi issued a statement that called signing the amicus brief an act of "election subversion." She also reprimanded Gooden and the other House members who supported the lawsuit: "The 126 Republican Members that signed onto this lawsuit brought dishonor to the House. Instead of upholding their oath to support and defend the Constitution, they chose to subvert the Constitution and undermine public trust in our sacred democratic institutions." New Jersey Democratic Representative Bill Pascrell, called for Pelosi to not seat Gooden and the other Republicans who signed onto the brief supporting the suit, arguing that "the text of the 14th Amendment expressly forbids Members of Congress from engaging in rebellion against the United States. Trying to overturn a democratic election and install a dictator seems like a pretty clear example of that."

Gooden voted against certifying the electors from Arizona and Pennsylvania in the 2020 United States presidential election and voted against the second impeachment of Donald Trump following the 2021 United States Capitol attack.

==== George Floyd Justice in Policing Act ====
On March 3, 2021, Gooden was the only House Republican to vote for the George Floyd Justice in Policing Act, which passed 220–212. Later that evening, he tweeted that he voted for the bill "accidentally", claiming he pushed the wrong button, a mistake he failed to notice in time. Gooden then tweeted that he had "arguably the most conservative/America First voting record in Congress", and "Of course I wouldn't support the radical left's, Anti-Police Act". According to Gooden, he had the official record changed to reflect his opposition.

==== Iraq ====
In June 2021, Gooden was one of 49 House Republicans to vote to repeal the Authorization for Use of Military Force Against Iraq Resolution of 2002.

==== Immigration ====
Gooden voted against the Further Consolidated Appropriations Act of 2020 which authorizes DHS to nearly double the available H-2B visas for the remainder of FY 2020.

==== Israel ====
Gooden voted to support Israel following the 2023 Hamas attack on Israel.

==== LGBT rights ====
On July 19, 2022, Gooden did not vote for the Respect for Marriage Act, which would codify the right to same-sex marriage in federal law.

In August 2022, he co-sponsored a bill put forth by Marjorie Taylor Greene that would criminalize gender-affirming health care for trans youth.

==== Hong Kong ====
In October 2022, Politico reported that Gooden criticized some US-based financial executives for attending the Global Financial Leaders' Investment Summit, saying: "The hypocrisy is staggering and every financial institution enabling China's atrocities should be ashamed."

==== Judy Chu ====
In February 2023, after U.S. Representative Judy Chu defended Dominic Ng, a Biden administration appointee, from allegations he was tied to Chinese Communist Party (CCP) front organizations, Gooden criticized Chu on Fox News. Gooden told Jesse Watters "I question her either loyalty or competence." A House GOP letter to the FBI implied that Chu, who is Chinese-American, had links to CCP front groups, prompting the Congressional Asian Pacific American Caucus (CAPAC) to condemn this letter. Gooden further criticized CAPAC, stating "We're standing up to communist China and these Democrats' first reaction is to come to their defense and call us all racists. I'm really disappointed and shocked that someone like Judy Chu would have a security clearance and be entitled to confidential intelligence briefings until this is figured out." Chu denounced Gooden's remarks as "racist", while House Democratic leader Hakeem Jeffries accused Gooden of xenophobia. In response, Gooden said "Chu and Jeffries are playing the race card in a sick display of disloyalty to our nation."

==== Financial disclosures ====
In September 2021, nonprofit group Campaign Legal Center filed an ethics complaint against Gooden with the Office of Congressional Ethics, claiming that Gooden appeared to have violated the Stop Trading on Congressional Knowledge (STOCK) Act of 2012, a federal transparency and conflict-of-interest law, by failing to properly disclose a dozen purchases of stock worth between $60,019 and $376,000 that he made in 2020. In response, Gooden claimed that all of the transactions in question fell short of the mandatory federal reporting threshold of $1,000.

==== Agriculture ====
On October 5, 2023, Gooden signed a letter to the House Agriculture Committee along with 15 House Republicans opposing the inclusion of the Ending Agricultural Trade Suppression (EATS) Act in the 2023 farm bill. The EATS Act, introduced in response to the California farm animal welfare law Proposition 12, would have overturned state and local animal welfare laws restricting the sale of agricultural goods from animals raised in battery cages, gestation crates, and veal crates.The letter argued that the legislation would infringe on states' rights and disproportionately benefit foreign-owned agribusinesses like the Chinese-owned pork producer WH Group.

==== United Nations ====
In 2025, Gooden reintroduced the No Tax Dollars for the United Nations Immigration Invasion Act. The proposed law bars the United States from funding United Nations agencies related to migration, including UNRWA. Gooden alleged that the United Nations was funding an invasion of the United States by immigrants, stating "It's time to stop subsidizing our own destruction. The United Nations is running a taxpayer-funded operation to funnel illegal immigrants into our country, threatening our sovereignty, security, and the very fabric of our nation.

==== Ukraine aid ====
In April 2024, Gooden voted against the $60 billion military aid package for Ukraine; The Washington Post reported that some of the funding would have supported defense jobs in his constituency.

==== 2025 Presidential address to Congress ====
At the presidential address on March 4, 2025, Gooden grabbed a sign out of Representative Melanie Stansbury's hands that read "This is not normal", and threw it behind him in the House Chamber.

==== Iran ====
Gooden supports the Mojahedin-e-Khalq (MEK), an organization of Iranian dissidents living in exile in Albania. Gooden is a founding member of the Congressional ASHRAF Protection and Rights Advocacy Caucus, formed to support the MEK. Gooden said the Caucus would "support the humanitarian and democratic rights of Iranian dissidents living in Ashraf-3, Albania, and worldwide, fighting for regime change and freedom in Iran." The MEK's compound at Camp Ashraf 3 was raided by the Albanian government after the organization was accused of cybercrimes. The organization, which was formerly designated as a terror group by the U.S. government, has been accused of having "cult-like tendencies".

==== Public Access to Law ====
On June 23, 2025, Gooden, Deborah Ross, and Dina Titus introduced the Pro Codes Act. If enacted, the bill would allow private, for-profit corporations to claim copyright of laws based on the "model codes" they sell to government bodies. This would overturn cases like Veeck v. Southern Building Code Congress Int'l that have held that the public has the right to view, copy, dissect, and critique laws they are held to regardless of the authorship of the text.

=== Committee assignments ===
For the 119th Congress:

- Committee on Armed Services
  - Subcommittee on Cyber, Information Technologies, and Innovation
  - Subcommittee on Seapower and Projection Forces
  - Subcommittee on Tactical Air and Land Forces
- Committee on the Judiciary
  - Subcommittee on the Administrative State, Regulatory Reform, and Antitrust
  - Subcommittee on Courts, Intellectual Property, Artificial Intelligence, and the Internet

=== Caucus memberships ===
- Congressional Brazil Caucus (co-chair)
- Congressional Caucus on Turkey and Turkish Americans
- Congressional Taiwan Caucus
- Republican Study Committee

== Electoral history ==
Republican primary results
Party	Candidate	Votes	%
Republican	Lance Gooden	17,501	29.9
Republican	Bunni Pounds	12,895	22.0
Republican	Sam Deen	10,102	17.2
Republican	Kenneth Sheets	7,011	12.0
Republican	Jason Wright	6,675	11.4
Republican	Danny Campbell	1,767	3.0
Republican	David Williams	1,603	2.7
Republican	Charles Lingerfelt	1,023	1.8
Total votes		58,777	100.0

Republican primary runoff results
Party	Candidate	Votes	%
Republican	Lance Gooden	18,364	54.0
Republican	Bunni Pounds	15,634	46.0
Total votes		33,998	100.0

Texas's 5th congressional district, 2018
Party	Candidate	Votes	%
Republican	Lance Gooden	130,617	62.3
Democratic	Dan Wood	78,666	37.6
Independent	Phil Gray (write-in)	224	0.1
Total votes		209,507	100.0
Republican hold			

Texas's 5th congressional district, 2020
Party	Candidate	Votes	%
Republican	Lance Gooden (incumbent)	173,836	62.0
Democratic	Carolyn Salter	100,743	35.9
Libertarian	Kevin Hale	5,834	2.1
Total votes		280,413	100.0
Republican hold			

Texas's 5th congressional district, 2022
Party	Candidate	Votes	%
Republican	Lance Gooden (incumbent)	135,595	63.97
Democratic	Tartisha Hill	71,930	33.93
Libertarian	Kevin Hale	4,293	2.03
Write-in	Ruth Torres	147	0.07
Total votes		211,965	100.0
Republican hold			

Texas's 5th congressional district, 2024
Party	Candidate	Votes	%
Republican	Lance Gooden (incumbent)	192,185	64.1
Democratic	Ruth Torres	107,712	35.9
Total votes		299,897	100.0
Republican hold			

2026 Texas's 5th congressional district election
Party	Candidate	Votes	%
Republican	Lance Gooden (incumbent)	130,278	51.5
Democratic	Chelsey Hockett	122,855	48.5
Total votes		253,133	100.0
Republican hold			

== Personal life ==
On October 1, 2016, Gooden married Alexa Calligas, whose family is from Shreveport, Louisiana. They reside in Terrell with their two children.

Gooden grew up attending the Rockwall and Brin Church of Christ in Terrell, Texas, and remains a member of that congregation.

=== Ethics investigation ===
On November 9, 2026, the House Ethics Committee released a report stating that Gooden was under congressional investigation for allegations he had improperly sought taxpayer reimbursement for "extravagant" travel expenses, some of which may have been unrelated to his job, and that he also had misspent campaign funds on personal trips. Gooden denied the allegations, and called the investigation "insane" and "bogus."

U.S. House of Representatives
Preceded by Jeb Hensarling	Member of the U.S. House of Representatives from Texas's 5th congressional district 2019–present	Incumbent
U.S. order of precedence (ceremonial)
Preceded by Jared Golden	United States representatives by seniority 204th	Succeeded by Michael Guest
