= Curtis Soileau =

American politician

Member of the Texas House of Representatives from the 20th district
- In office January 10, 1989 – January 12, 1993
- Preceded by: Jerry Clark
- Succeeded by: Zeb Zbranek

Personal details
- Born: March 5, 1961 (age 65)
- Party: Democratic

Curtis Soileau (born March 5, 1961) is an American politician who served in the Texas House of Representatives from the 20th district from 1989 to 1993.
