= Oscar Brookshire =

American politician

Member of the Texas House of Representatives from the 6th district
- In office January 13, 1981 – January 11, 1983
- Preceded by: Buddy Temple
- Succeeded by: David Hudson

Personal details
- Born: March 3, 1930 Lufkin, Texas
- Died: October 14, 1987 (aged 57) Lufkin, Texas
- Party: Democratic

Oscar Brookshire (March 3, 1930 – October 14, 1987) was an American politician who served in the Texas House of Representatives from the 6th district from 1981 to 1983.

He died on October 14, 1987, in Lufkin, Texas at age 57.
