= John M. Henderson =

American politician

John Morgan Henderson (September 10, 1868 – March 16, 1947) was an American politician.

Henderson served in the Texas House of Representatives as a Democrat 1907-1909 and then in the Texas State Senate 1914–1919, He served as president pro tem of the senate.
