= Richard H. Wells =

American state legislator (1831–1896)

Richard H. Wells (1831 – March 12, 1896) was an American state legislator in Florida. He represented Leon County, Florida in the Florida House of Representatives from 1868 to 1872.

He was born in Smithfield, Virginia. He was a delegate at Florida's 1868 Constitutional Convention.

He offered a resolution regarding the investigation of judge T. T. Long and recommended passage of a bill regarding marks and brands of stock and cattle.

As a member of the Assembly his salary in 1871 was $500.

In 1870 he nominated Frederick Douglass to be a U.S. senator from Florida and Democrat nominated Jefferson Davis.

== See also ==
- African American officeholders from the end of the Civil War until before 1900
