= Steve Burgess =

American politician (1907–1987)

Member of the Texas House of Representatives
- In office January 13, 1959 – January 9, 1973
- Preceded by: Curtis George Goetz
- Succeeded by: Roy Blake, Sr.
- Constituency: 6th district (1959–63); 5th district (1965–67); 4th district (1967–73)

Nacogdoches County Judge

Personal details
- Born: Steve Alton Burgess; July 9, 1907 Nacogdoches, Texas, U.S.
- Died: May 28, 1987 (aged 79) Nacogdoches, Texas, U.S.
- Party: Democratic
- Children: 2

Steve Alton Burgess (July 9, 1907 – May 28, 1987) was a Texas politician who served in the Texas House of Representatives for district 4, 5, and 6.

== Personal life ==
Steve Alton Burgess was born on July 9, 1907, in Nacogdoches, Texas, to Timothy Eugene Burgess and Mary Bell Lackey. He was a life long resident of Nacogdoches County, Texas, and was a rancher and dairyman. He had 2 children Raymond and Rochelle. He was member of First United Methodist Church. Burgess died on May 28, 1987, in Nacogdoches, Texas.

== Political career ==
Burgess served in the Texas House of Representatives for districts 6, 5, and 4. He later served as county judge of Nacogdoches County, Texas. Burgess was affiliated with the Democratic Party.

Political offices
Preceded by Guy Vernon McDonald	Texas House of Representatives from district 4 January 10, 1967 – January 9, 1973	Succeeded by Roy Blake Sr.
Preceded by Robert Lewis Fairchild	Texas House of Representatives from district 5 January 12, 1965 – January 10, 1967	Succeeded by John H. Hannah
Preceded by Curtis George Goetz	Texas House of Representatives from district 6 January 13, 1959 – January 8, 1963	Succeeded by Charlie Wilson
Preceded by	Nacogdoches County Judge	Succeeded by
