= Texas's 11th House of Representatives district =

American legislative district

Texas's 11th State House of Representatives district
Representative
Joanne Shofner; R–Nacogdoches
- Demographics: 63.2% White; 16.9% Black; 16.6% Hispanic; 1.2% Asian; 2.1% Other
- Population (2020) • Voting age: 185,491; 143,703

District 11 is a district in the Texas House of Representatives. It was created in the 3rd legislature (1849–1851).

The district has been represented by Republican Joanne Shofner since January 8, 2013, upon her initial election to the Texas House.

As a result of redistricting after the 2020 Federal census, from the 2022 elections the district encompasses all of Nacogdoches, Newton, Panola, Rusk, Sabine, and Shelby Counties. Major cities in the district include Carthage, Center, Hemphill, Henderson, Nacogdoches, and Newton. Stephen F. Austin State University is in the district, as is the Texas portion of Toledo Bend Reservoir.
