= Travis Clack Henderson =

American politician (1836-1919)

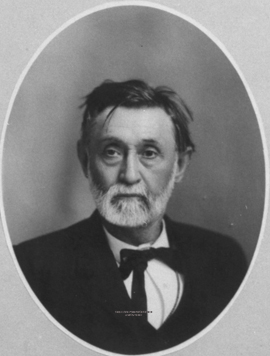

Member of the Texas Senate from the 3rd district
- In office January 13, 1903 – January 10, 1905
- Preceded by: Charles Allen Wheeler
- Succeeded by: A. P. Barrett

Member of the Texas House of Representatives
- In office January 9, 1883 – January 13, 1903
- Preceded by: James S. Woods
- Succeeded by: Elvis Abner Calvin
- Constituency: 22nd district (1883–1885); 20th district (1885–1887); 6th district (1883–1887, 1899–1903)

Personal details
- Born: June 24, 1836 Alabama, U.S.
- Died: September 10, 1919 (aged 83)
- Party: Democratic
- Spouse: Martha Sue Thomas (m. 1866; died 1885)
- Children: 7
- Occupation: Politician; farmer

Military service
- Allegiance: Texas
- Branch/service: 32nd dismounted cavalry
- Rank: Captain; staff officer
- Battles/wars: United States Civil War

Travis Clack Henderson (June 24, 1836 – September 10, 1919) was a Texas legislator and farmer who served as a Democrat in the Texas Senate and Texas House of Representatives.

== Background ==
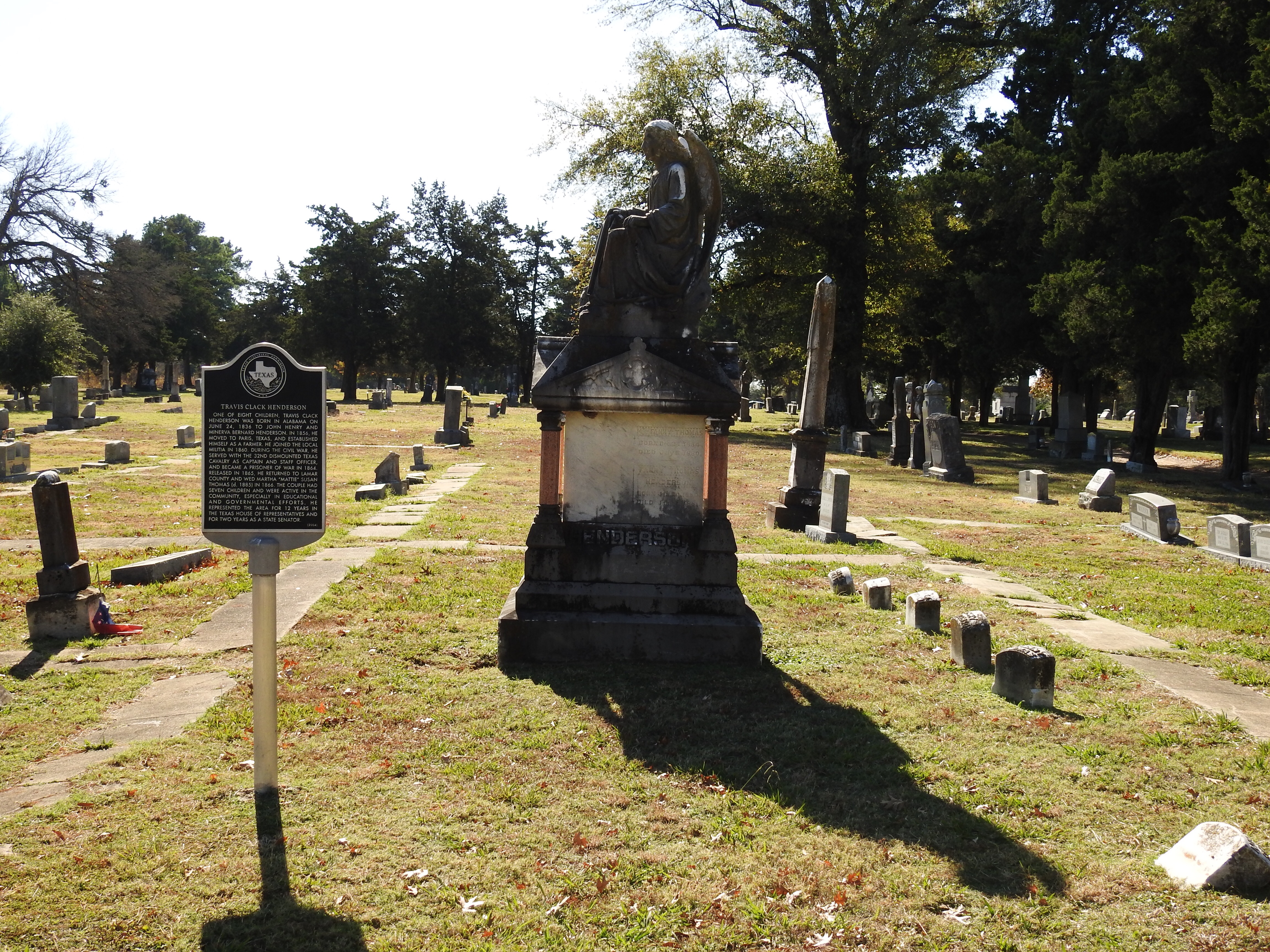
Henderson's gravesite and historical marker.

Travis Clack Henderson was born on June 24, 1836, in Alabama to John Henry and Minerva Benard Henderson. He had 7 siblings. In 1857, he moved to Paris, Texas, and became a farmer. In 1866, he married Martha "Mattie" Sue Thomas in Lamar County, Texas, with whom he had 7 children. She died in 1885. Henderson died September 10, 1919.

Henderson served in the United States Civil War as a captain and staff officer in the 32nd dismounted Texas calvary.

== Political career ==
Henderson served in the Texas House of Representatives and Texas Senate as a Democrat.
