= Edward Brown =

Edward Brown may refer to:

== Government and politics ==
- Ed Brown (Texas politician) (fl. 1874), Texas state senator
- Edward Brown (barrister) (born 1958), Senior Treasury Counsel
- Edward Brown (Manitoba politician) (1865–1947), leader of the Manitoba Liberal Party
- Edward Brown (British politician) (1913–1991), Member of Parliament for Bath
- Edward Brown (American lawyer) (c. 1790–1860), South Carolina lawyer and proslavery writer
- Edward George Brown (1829–1895), New South Wales colonial politician
- Edward L. Brown (1805–1876), physician and political figure in the Nova Scotia House of Assembly
- L. Edward Brown (born 1937), mayor of Pocatello, Idaho, member of the Idaho House of Representatives, and a leader in the LDS Church
- Edward Everett Brown (1858–1919), American civil rights lawyer

== Sports ==
- Ed Brown (baseball), 19th-century American baseball player
- Ed Brown (end) (born c. 1931), American football end
- Ed Brown (quarterback) (1928–2007), American football quarterback
- Edward Brown (cricketer, born 1837) (1837–1900), Australian cricketer
- Edward Brown (cricketer, born 1891) (1891–1949), Australian cricketer
- Edward Brown (footballer) (1881–1904 or later), English footballer
- Edward D. Brown (1850–1906), African American jockey
- Ed Brown (racing driver) (born 1963), American racing driver

== Other ==
- Edward Espe Brown (born 1945), American Zen teacher and author
- Edward Brown (born 1942) of Edward and Elaine Brown, American tax protesters
- Ed Brown (died 1978), of the Copp and Brown children's record series
- Edward Douglas Brown (1861–1940), recipient of the Victoria Cross
- Edward Eagle Brown (1885–1959), American attorney and businessman
- Edward Brown Jr. (1841–1911), Irish soldier who fought in the American Civil War
- Edward J. Brown (academic) (1909–1991), American literary scholar
- Edward J. Brown (unionist) (1893–1950), American labor union leader
- Jim Copp and Ed Brown (1913 – 1999), American musical duo

== See also ==
- Edward Browne (disambiguation)
- Eddie Brown (disambiguation)
- Ted Brown (disambiguation)
- Edwin Brown (1898–1972), Australian rugby league footballer
- Edwin Brown (naturalist) (died 1876), English naturalist and entomologist
