= Texas's 5th House of Representatives district =

American legislative district

Texas's 5th State House of Representatives district
Representative
Cole Hefner; R–Mount Pleasant
- Demographics: 67.5% White; 9.3% Black; 19.3% Hispanic; 1.0% Asian; 2.9% Other
- Population (2020) • Voting age: 186,084; 142,286

District 5 is a district in the Texas House of Representatives. It was created in the 3rd legislature (1849–1851).

The district has been represented by Republican Cole Hefner since January 10, 2017, upon his initial election to the Texas House.

As a result of redistricting after the 2020 Federal census, from the 2022 elections the district encompasses all of Camp, Rains, Titus, Upshur, and Wood Counties, and the northern half of Smith County. Major cities in the district include Emory, Gilmer, Lindale, Mineola, Mount Pleasant, Pittsburg, and Quitman. The district includes the majority of Lake Fork Reservoir and a portion of Lake Tawakoni.

== List of representatives ==
Leg.	Representative	Party	Term start	Term end	Counties represented
3rd	William M. Williams	Unknown	November 5, 1849	November 3, 1851	Fannin, Lamar
4th	William G. W. Jowers	Unknown	November 3, 1851	November 7, 1853	Anderson, Houston
4th	Cyrus H. Randolph	Unknown	November 3, 1851	November 7, 1853	Anderson, Houston
5th	William H. Bourland	Unknown	November 7, 1853	November 5, 1855	Grayson
6th	George R. Reeves	Unknown	November 5, 1855	November 2, 1857	Grayson
7th	George R. Reeves	Unknown	November 2, 1857	November 7, 1859	Grayson
8th	John E. Henry	Unknown	November 7, 1859	November 4, 1861	Grayson
9th	Richard F. Slaughter	Unknown	November 4, 1861	November 2, 1863	Sabine, San Augustine
10th	Richard F. Slaughter	Unknown	November 2, 1863	August 6, 1866	Sabine, San Augustine
11th	Thomas W. Blount	Unknown	August 8, 1866	February 7, 1870	Sabine, San Augustine
12th	Benjamin B. Lacy	Democratic	February 9, 1870	January 14, 1873	Panola, Rusk
12th	Adison D. Tinsley	Republican	February 16, 1870	January 14, 1873	Panola, Rusk
12th	Augustus J. Booty	Democratic	February 21, 1870	January 14, 1873	Panola, Rusk
13th	Augustus J. Booty	Democratic	January 14, 1873	January 13, 1874	Panola, Rusk
13th	Thomas G. Allison	Democratic	January 14, 1873	January 13, 1874	Panola, Rusk
13th	William W. Morris	Democratic	January 14, 1873	January 13, 1874	Panola, Rusk
14th	Meshack R. Roberts	Republican	January 13, 1874	April 18, 1876	Harrison, Rusk
14th	David Abner Sr.	Republican	January 13, 1874	April 18, 1876	Harrison, Rusk
14th	Edward Brown	Republican	January 13, 1874	April 18, 1876	Harrison, Rusk
15th	Washington Holley	Democratic	April 18, 1876	January 14, 1879	Houston
16th	William A. Stewart	Democratic	January 14, 1879	January 11, 1881	Houston
17th	Benjamin F. Frymier	Democratic	January 11, 1881	January 9, 1883	Houston
18th	Stephen W. Blount Jr.	Democratic	January 9, 1883	January 13, 1885	Sabine, San Augustine, Shelby
19th	Stephen W. Blount Jr.	Democratic	January 13, 1885	January 11, 1887	Sabine, San Augustine, Shelby
20th	John H. Truitt	Democratic	January 11, 1887	January 8, 1889	Sabine, San Augustine, Shelby
21st	John P. Childers	Democratic	January 8, 1889	January 13, 1891	Sabine, San Augustine, Shelby
22nd	James W. Truitt	Democratic	January 13, 1891	January 10, 1893	Sabine, San Augustine, Shelby
23rd	P. H. Rogers	Democratic	January 10, 1893	January 8, 1895	Morris, Red River, Titus
24th	James McWright Moore	Democratic	January 8, 1895	January 12, 1897	Morris, Red River, Titus
25th	Henry T. Rhea	Democratic	January 12, 1897	January 10, 1899	Morris, Red River, Titus
26th	John W. Bolin	Democratic	January 10, 1899	January 8, 1901	Morris, Red River, Titus
27th	Lynn B. Roach	Democratic	January 8, 1901	January 13, 1903	Morris, Red River, Titus
28th	Aubrey T. Stell	Democratic	January 13, 1903	January 10, 1905	Delta, Franklin, Hopkins
29th	Cader Adkin Shelby	Democratic	January 10, 1905	January 8, 1907	Delta, Franklin, Hopkins
30th	Cader Adkin Shelby	Democratic	January 8, 1907	January 12, 1909	Delta, Franklin, Hopkins
31st	Henry E. Pharr	Democratic	January 12, 1909	January 10, 1911	Delta, Franklin, Hopkins
32nd	Henry E. Pharr	Democratic	January 10, 1911	January 14, 1913	Delta, Franklin, Hopkins
33rd	Sidney Smith Baker	Democratic	January 14, 1913	January 12, 1915	Panola
34th	Alfred E. Meador	Democratic	January 12, 1915	January 9, 1917	Panola
35th	Alfred E. Meador	Democratic	January 9, 1917	January 14, 1919	Panola
36th	William E. Biggs	Democratic	January 14, 1919	January 11, 1921	Panola
37th	W. S. Crawford	Democratic	January 11, 1921	January 9, 1923	Panola
38th	Virgil D. Fugler	Democratic	January 9, 1923	July 20, 1924	Harrison
39th	John E.V. Jasper	Democratic	January 13, 1925	October 16, 1925	Harrison
39th	Vacant	N/A	October 16, 1925	September 13, 1926	Harrison
39th	Benjamin T. Woodall	Democratic	September 13, 1926	January 11, 1927	Harrison
40th	Benjamin T. Woodall	Democratic	January 11, 1927	January 8, 1929	Harrison
41st	Benjamin T. Woodall	Democratic	January 8, 1929	July 5, 1929	Harrison
41st	Vacant	N/A	July 5, 1929	January 20, 1930	Harrison
41st	Joseph Andrew Riley	Democratic	January 20, 1930	January 13, 1931	Harrison
42nd	Hubbard S. Caven	Democratic	January 13, 1931	January 10, 1933	Harrison
43rd	Hubbard S. Caven	Democratic	January 10, 1933	January 8, 1935	Harrison
44th	Robert H. Wood	Democratic	January 8, 1935	January 12, 1937	Harrison
45th	Robert H. Wood	Democratic	January 12, 1937	January 10, 1939	Harrison
46th	Robert H. Wood	Democratic	January 10, 1939	January 14, 1941	Harrison
47th	Robert V. Avant Sr.	Democratic	January 14, 1941	January 12, 1943	Harrison
48th	Robert V. Avant Sr.	Democratic	January 12, 1943	January 11, 1944	Harrison
49th	Isom P. Hydrick Jr.	Democratic	January 9, 1945	January 14, 1947	Harrison
50th	Isom P. Hydrick Jr.	Democratic	January 14, 1947	January 11, 1949	Harrison
51st	Walter T. Caven	Democratic	January 11, 1949	January 9, 1951	Harrison
52nd	Reagan R. Huffman	Democratic	January 9, 1951	January 13, 1953	Harrison
53rd	Albert D. Downer	Democratic	January 13, 1953	January 11, 1955	Panola, Shelby
54th	Billy E. Hunt	Democratic	January 11, 1955	January 8, 1957	Panola, Shelby
55th	Velma L. Ramsey	Democratic	January 8, 1957	January 13, 1959	Panola, Shelby
56th	Velma L. Ramsey	Democratic	January 13, 1959	January 10, 1961	Panola, Shelby
57th	Robert L. Fairchild	Democratic	January 10, 1961	January 8, 1963	Panola, Shelby
58th	Robert L. Fairchild	Democratic	January 8, 1963	January 12, 1965	Nacogdoches, San Augustine, Shelby
59th	Steve A. Burgess	Democratic	January 12, 1965	January 10, 1967	Nacogdoches, San Augustine, Shelby
60th	John H. Hannah Jr.	Democratic	January 10, 1967	January 14, 1969	Angelina, Polk, San Jacinto, Trinity
61st	John H. Hannah Jr.	Democratic	January 14, 1969	January 12, 1971	Angelina, Polk, San Jacinto
62nd	John H. Hannah Jr.	Democratic	January 12, 1971	January 9, 1973	Angelina, Polk, San Jacinto
63rd	Herman Adams Jr.	Democratic	January 9, 1973	January 14, 1975	Hardin, Jasper, Jefferson
64th	Herman Adams Jr.	Democratic	January 14, 1975	January 11, 1977	Hardin, Jasper, Jefferson
65th	Herman Adams Jr.	Democratic	January 11, 1977	January 10, 1978	Hardin, Jasper, Jefferson
65th	Vacant	N/A	January 10, 1978	March 31, 1978	Hardin, Jasper, Jefferson
65th	Jerry L. Clark	Democratic	March 31, 1978	January 9, 1979	Hardin, Jasper, Jefferson
66th	Jerry L. Clark	Democratic	January 9, 1979	January 13, 1981	Hardin, Jasper, Jefferson
67th	Jerry L. Clark	Democratic	January 13, 1981	January 11, 1983	Hardin, Jasper, Jefferson
68th	Bill G. Hollowell	Democratic	January 11, 1983	January 8, 1985	Smith, Upshur, Van Zandt
69th	Bill G. Hollowell	Democratic	January 8, 1985	January 13, 1987	Smith, Upshur, Van Zandt
70th	Bill G. Hollowell	Democratic	January 13, 1987	January 10, 1989	Smith, Upshur, Van Zandt
71st	Bill G. Hollowell	Democratic	January 10, 1989	January 8, 1991	Smith, Upshur, Van Zandt
72nd	Bob D. Glaze	Democratic	January 8, 1991	January 12, 1993	Smith, Upshur, Van Zandt
73rd	Bob D. Glaze	Democratic	January 12, 1993	January 10, 1995	Smith, Upshur, Van Zandt
74th	Bob D. Glaze	Democratic	January 10, 1995	January 14, 1997	Smith, Upshur, Van Zandt
75th	Bob D. Glaze	Democratic	January 14, 1997	January 12, 1999	Smith, Upshur, Van Zandt
76th	Bob D. Glaze	Democratic	January 12, 1999	January 9, 2001	Smith, Upshur, Van Zandt
77th	Bob D. Glaze	Democratic	January 9, 2001	January 14, 2003	Smith, Upshur, Van Zandt
78th	Bryan Hughes	Republican	January 14, 2003	January 11, 2005	Camp, Harrison, Upshur, Wood
79th	Bryan Hughes	Republican	January 11, 2005	January 9, 2007	Camp, Harrison, Upshur, Wood
80th	Bryan Hughes	Republican	January 9, 2007	January 13, 2009	Camp, Harrison, Upshur, Wood
81st	Bryan Hughes	Republican	January 13, 2009	January 11, 2011	Camp, Harrison, Upshur, Wood
82nd	Bryan Hughes	Republican	January 11, 2011	January 8, 2013	Camp, Harrison, Upshur, Wood
83rd	Bryan Hughes	Republican	January 8, 2013	January 13, 2015	Camp, Morris, Rains, Smith, Titus, Wood
84th	Bryan Hughes	Republican	January 13, 2015	January 10, 2017	Camp, Morris, Rains, Smith, Titus, Wood
85th	Cole Hefner	Republican	January 10, 2017	January 8, 2019	Camp, Morris, Rains, Smith, Titus, Wood
86th	Cole Hefner	Republican	January 8, 2019	January 12, 2021	Camp, Morris, Rains, Smith, Titus, Wood
87th	Cole Hefner	Republican	January 12, 2021	January 10, 2023	Camp, Morris, Rains, Smith, Titus, Wood
88th	Cole Hefner	Republican	January 10, 2023	January 14, 2025	Camp, Rains, Smith, Titus, Upshur, Wood
89th	Cole Hefner	Republican	January 14, 2025	Present	Camp, Rains, Smith, Titus, Upshur, Wood
