= 2010 Texas Senate election =

- November 4, 2010

16 of the 31 seats in the Texas Senate 16 seats needed for a majority
| | Majority party | Minority party | Third party |
|---|---|---|---|
| Party | Republican | Democratic | Libertarian |
| Seats before | 19 | 12 | 0 |
| Seats won | 19 | 12 | 0 |
| Seat change | Steady | Steady | Steady |
| Popular vote | 1,839,653 | 591,423 | 172,017 |
| Percentage | 70.65% | 22.71% | 6.61% |
| Swing | ▲16.98% | ▼17.43% | ▲0.42% |
- Senate results by district Republican hold Democratic hold No election
President Pro Tempore before election
Republican
Elected President Pro Tempore
Republican

The 2010 Texas Senate elections took place as part of the biennial United States elections. Texas voters elected state senators in 16 State Senate districts. The winners of this election served in the 82nd Texas Legislature. State senators typically serve four-year terms in the Texas State Senate, but all Senators come up for election in the cycles following each decennial redistricting. As such, all of the seats up for this election were for two-year terms, with senators up for re-election in the following 2012 Texas State Senate elections.

Following the 2008 Texas Senate election, the Republicans maintained effective control of the Senate with nineteen members to the Democrats' twelve.

To claim control of the chamber from Republicans, the Democrats needed to gain four seats. In the end, no seats changed hands.

== Background ==
The Republican Party had held the State Senate since the 1996 elections.

== Predictions ==
| Source | Ranking | As of |
|---|---|---|
| Governing | Safe R | November 1, 2010 |

== Summary of race results ==
Summary of the November 2, 2010 Texas Senate election results
| Party | Candidates | Votes | | Seats | | | | |
| Party | Candidates | No. | % | Before | Up | Won | After | +/– |
|---|---|---|---|---|---|---|---|---|
| Republican | 16 | 1,839,653 | 70.65 | 19 | 11 | 11 | 19 | Steady |
| Democratic | 8 | 591,423 | 22.71 | 12 | 5 | 5 | 12 | Steady |
| Libertarian | 8 | 172,017 | 6.61 | 0 | 0 | 0 | 0 | Steady |
| Write-in | 1 | 885 | 0.03 | 0 | 0 | 0 | 0 | Steady |
| Total | | 2,603,976 | 100.00 | 31 | | | 31 | Steady |

Popular vote
| Republican | 70.65% |
| Democratic | 22.71% |
| Libertarian | 6.61% |
| Write-in | 0.03% |

Senate seats won
| Republican | 61.29% |
| Democratic | 38.71% |

== Close races ==
| District | Winner | Margin |
|---|---|---|
| District 19 | Democratic | 7.06% |

== Summary of results by State Senate district ==
| District | Democratic | | Republican | | Others | | Total | | Result |
| District | Votes | % | Votes | % | Votes | % | Votes | % | Result |
|---|---|---|---|---|---|---|---|---|---|
| District 1 | - | - | 140,273 | 100.00% | - | - | 140,273 | 100.00% | Republican hold |
| District 2 | 53,566 | 33.62% | 105,779 | 66.38% | - | - | 159,345 | 100.00% | Republican hold |
| District 3 | - | - | 153,906 | 88.90% | 19,211 | 11.10% | 173,117 | 100.00% | Republican hold |
| District 5 | 58,525 | 28.73% | 145,170 | 71.27% | - | - | 203,695 | 100.00% | Republican hold |
| District 7 | - | - | 184,704 | 86.41% | 29,048 | 13.59% | 213,752 | 100.00% | Republican hold |
| District 8 | - | - | 136,369 | 84.02% | 25,935 | 15.98% | 162,304 | 100.00% | Republican hold |
| District 12 | - | - | 148,592 | 86.15% | 23,894 | 13.85% | 172,486 | 100.00% | Republican hold |
| District 13 | 113,155 | 78.17% | 31,596 | 21.83% | - | - | 144,751 | 100.00% | Democratic hold |
| District 14 | 115,949 | 60.73% | 68,100 | 35.67% | 6,884 | 3.61% | 190,933 | 100.00% | Democratic hold |
| District 15 | 77,096 | 59.28% | 52,959 | 40.72% | - | - | 130,055 | 100.00% | Democratic hold |
| District 17 | - | - | 112,595 | 83.16% | 22,802 | 16.84% | 135,397 | 100.00% | Republican hold |
| District 18 | 61,345 | 29.57% | 146,087 | 70.43% | - | - | 207,432 | 100.00% | Republican hold |
| District 19 | 61,327 | 52.14% | 53,024 | 45.08% | 3,269 | 2.78% | 117,620 | 100.00% | Democratic hold |
| District 22 | - | - | 134,231 | 100.00% | - | - | 134,231 | 100.00% | Republican hold |
| District 25 | - | - | 192,965 | 82.18% | 41,857 | 17.82% | 234,822 | 100.00% | Republican hold |
| District 29 | 50,460 | 60.24% | 33,303 | 39.76% | - | - | 83,763 | 100.00% | Democratic hold |
| Total | 591,423 | 22.71% | 1,839,653 | 70.65% | 172,900 | 6.64% | 2,603,976 | 100.00% | Source: |

=== Notable races ===
District 22: In March 2010, after winning the Republican primary for his seat, Senator Kip Averitt announced that he would step down from his seat in the Texas Senate. This triggered a special election which took place on May 8, 2010. No candidate won 50% of the vote, so the top two vote winners advanced to a runoff held on June 22, 2010. Averitt backed former state Senator David Sibley, but Brian Birdwell won the election. As he had won the March primary, Averitt's name was still set to be on the ballot in November, but he withdrew his name shortly after Birdwell's victory. As the incumbent Senator, Birdwell's name was placed on the ballot in Averitt's place, and he won the general election unopposed.

Texas's 22nd state senate district special election
| Party | Candidate | Votes | % |
|---|---|---|---|
| Republican | David Sibley | 13,423 | 44.97% |
| Republican | Brian Birdwell | 10,900 | 36.51% |
| Democratic | Gayle R. Avant | 3,968 | 13.29% |
| Republican | Darren Yancy | 1,560 | 5.23% |
| Total votes | | 29,851 | 100.00% |

Texas's 22nd state senate district special election runoff
| Party | Candidate | Votes | % |
|---|---|---|---|
| Republican | Brian Birdwell | 14,218 | 57.90% |
| Republican | David Sibley | 10,339 | 42.10% |
| Total votes | | 24,557 | 100.00% |
| Republican hold | | | |
