= 17th Texas Legislature =

The 17th Texas Legislature met from January 11, 1881, to May 5, 1882, in its regular session and one called session. All members of the House of Representatives and about half of the members of the Senate were elected in 1880 General Election.

== Sessions ==
- 17th Regular session: January 11–April 1, 1881
- 17th First called session: April 6–May 5, 1882

== Officers ==
=== Senate ===
Lieutenant Governor
Leonidas Jefferson Storey, Democrat
President pro tempore
Edwin Hobby, Democrat, Regular session
Francis Marion Martin, Democrat, ad interim, First called session

=== House of Representatives ===
Speaker of the House
George Robertson Reeves, Democrat

== Members ==
Members of the Seventeenth Texas Legislature as of the beginning of the Regular Session, January 11, 1881:

=== Senate ===
District	Senator	Party	Took office
1	Samuel Bronson Cooper	Democrat	1881
2	William Wallace Weatherred		1881
3	Richard M. Wynne		1881
4	Richard L. Hightower		1881
5	William H. Tilson		1879
6	William Jesse Swain		1879
7	John Martin Duncan		1879
8	John Young Gooch		1879
9	Henry W. Lightfoot		1881
10	John C. Buchanan		1879
11	J. M. Martin		1881
12	William D. Lair	Democrat	1879 (Prior: 1861–1863)
13	Anson Rainey		1881
14	Francis Marion Martin	Democrat	1879 (Prior: 1859–1861)
15	John Nathaniel Henderson		1881
16	John T. Buchanan		1879
17	Walter Moses Burton	Republican	1874
18	Charles Stewart		1879
19	James B. Stubbs		1881
20	William Kercheval Homan		1879
21	Andrew Jackson Harris		1881
22	Lawrence Sullivan Ross	Democrat	1881
23	William R. Shannon	Democrat	1879 (Prior: 1865–1867)
24	Jewett H. Davenport		1879 (Prior: 1874–1876)
25	Alexander Watkins Terrell	Democrat	1876
26	A. W. Moore	Democrat	1881 (Prior: 1861–1865)
27	Samuel C. Patton		1879
28	Ellsberry R. Lane		1876
29	Stephen Powers		1881
30	Augustus W. Houston	Democrat	1879
31	William Henry Burges	Democrat	1881

=== House of Representatives ===
- Benjamin M. Baker
- Thomas Beck
- William John Caven
- R. J. Evans
- George Finlay
- George Washington Lafayette Fly
- Lafayette Lumpkin Foster
- Charles Reese Gibson
- Andrew Jackson Harris
- William Kercheval Homan
- Joseph Chappell Hutcheson
- Robert A. Kerr
- Fergus Kyle
- Felix J. McCord
- Absolom C. Oliver
- Henry Joseph Richarz
- Thomas A. Rodríguez
- George Robertson Reeves
- Benjamin Dudley Tarlton
- George T. Todd
- Arthur Tompkins
- John Henry Traylor
- James W. Truitt
- William Wallace Weatherred
- Charles Louis Wurzbach

== Membership Changes ==
District	Outgoing Senator	Reason for Vacancy	Successor	Date of Successor's Installation
District 11	J. M. Martin	Martin died March 9, 1882.	William O. Davis	April 6, 1882
District 16	John T. Buchanan	Buchanan died January 29, 1882.	James G. McDonald	April 6, 1882
District 28	Ellsberry R. Lane	Lane resigned February 1, 1882.	Lucas H. Brown	April 6, 1882
District 29	Stephen Powers	Powers died after the Regular Session.	Charles A. McLane	April 6, 1882
