= 14th Texas Legislature =

The 14th Texas Legislature met from January 13, 1874, to March 15, 1875, in two regular sessions. All members of the House of Representatives and about half of the members of the Senate were elected in 1873.

== Sessions ==
- 14th First regular session: January 13–May 4, 1874
- 14th Second regular session: January 12–March 15, 1875

== Officers ==
=== Senate ===
Lieutenant Governor
Richard Bennett Hubbard, Jr.
President pro tempore (Lieutenant Governor ex officio)
Edward Bradford Pickett, Democrat

=== House of Representatives ===
Speaker of the House
Guy Morrison Bryan, Democrat

== Members ==
Members of the Fourteenth Texas Legislature as of the beginning of the Regular Session, January 13, 1874:

=== Senate ===
| District | Senator | Party | Took office |
|---|---|---|---|
| 1 | Edwin Hobby | Democrat | 1873 |
| 2 | William H. Swift | Democrat | 1871 |
| 3 | James Eldrage Dillard | Democrat | 1871 |
| 4 | Winfield B. Stirman | Democrat | 1873 |
| 5 | David Webster Flanagan | Republican | 1870 |
| 6 | John Lafayette Camp | Democrat | 1873 |
| 7 | David Browning Culberson | Democrat | 1873 |
| 8 | Cader A. Parker | Democrat | 1873 |
| 9 | L. D. Bradley | Democrat | 1873 |
| 10 | Joseph Morris | Democrat | 1873 |
| 11 | William E. Moore | Democrat | 1873 |
| 12 | Vacant | | 1873 |
| 13 | Walter Moses Burton | Republican | 1873 |
| 14 | William R. Baker | Democrat | 1873 |
| 15 | Edward T. Randle | Republican | 1872 |
| 16 | T. G. Davidson | Republican | 1873 |
| 17 | Jewett H. Davenport | Democrat | 1873 |
| 18 | William D. Wood | Democrat | 1873 |
| 19 | George Bernard Erath | Democrat | 1873 (Prior: 1857–1863) |
| 20 | Amzi Bradshaw | Democrat | 1873 |
| 21 | Robert D. Allison | Democrat | 1873 |
| 22 | William H. Trolinger | Democrat | 1873 |
| 23 | Andrew J. Ball | Democrat | 1872 |
| 24 | William R. Friend | Democrat | 1873 |
| 25 | Olinthus Ellis | Democrat | 1873 |
| 26 | William Hamilton Ledbetter | Democrat | 1873 |
| 27 | John Ireland | Democrat | 1873 |
| 28 | William H. Westfall | Democrat | 1873 |
| 29 | Joseph E. Dwyer | Democrat | 1873 |
| 30 | William Jarvis Russell, Jr. | Democrat | 1873 |

- Benjamin Cromwell Franklin was elected, but died on December 25, 1873, 2½ weeks before the start of the Regular Session.

=== House of Representatives ===
- David Abner, Sr.
- Decimus et Ultimus Barziza
- Thomas Beck
- Joseph Brown
- Ed Brown
- Guy Morrison Bryan
- John Hughes Cochran
- William Shelby Delaney
- James Eastland
- Lochlin Johnson Farrar
- Jacob E. Freeman
- James L. German
- James Marshall Harrison
- Thomas Hayes
- John Mitchell
- William Wilson Patrick, Robertson County
- Frank Rainey
- Meshack Roberts
- Lieuen Morgan Rogers
- Felix Ezell Smith
- Charles Bellinger Tate Stewart
- William Jesse Swain
- John Files Tom
- George Pickett
- William Amos Wortham

== Membership Changes ==
| District | Outgoing Senator | Reason for Vacancy | Successor | Date of Successor's Installation |
|---|---|---|---|---|
| District 6 | John Lafayette Camp | Camp resigned March 13, 1875. | Vacant | |
| District 7 | David Browning Culberson | Culberson resigned March 3, 1875. | Vacant | |
| District 12 | Vacant | Benjamin Cromwell Franklin, member-elect, died December 25, 1873. | Thomas Miller Joseph | March 19, 1874 |
| District 16 | T. G. Davidson | Davidson refused to qualify January 14, 1874. | Seth Shepard | March 26, 1874 |
| District 22 | William H. Trolinger | Trolinger resigned before January 25, 1875. | N. S. Craven | January 25, 1875 |

- District 16: Shepard elected in special election February 17, 1874, seated March 26, 1874 after election contest with Matthew Gaines
