= Blassingame =

Blassingame is a surname. Notable people with the surname include:

- Jerel Blassingame (born 1981), American professional basketball player
- John Wesley Blassingame (1940–2000), American historian and writer
- Lurton Blassingame (1904–1988), American literary agent
- Tia Blassingame (born 1971), American artist
- William Blassingame (1836–?), American politician
- Wyatt Rainey Blassingame (1909–1985), American author
