= 15th Texas Legislature =

The 15th Texas Legislature met from April 18 to August 21, 1876, in its regular session. All members of the House of Representatives and Senate were elected in February 1876 in accordance with the newly adopted Constitution of 1876.

== Sessions ==
- 15th Regular session: April 18 – August 21, 1876

== Officers ==
=== Senate ===
Lieutenant Governor
Richard Bennett Hubbard, Jr., Democrat
President pro tempore
Wells Thompson, Democrat

=== House of Representatives ===
Speaker of the House
Thomas Reuben Bonner, Democrat

== Members ==
Members of the Fifteenth Texas Legislature as of the beginning of the Regular Session, April 18, 1876:

=== Senate ===
| District | Senator | Party | Took office |
|---|---|---|---|
| 1 | Edwin Hobby | Democrat | 1874 |
| 2 | Peyton Forbes Edwards | Democrat | 1876 |
| 3 | James W. Motley | Democrat | 1876 |
| 4 | Walter Riptoe | Republican | 1876 |
| 5 | Francis M. Henry | Democrat | 1876 |
| 6 | William Amos Wortham | Democrat | 1876 |
| 7 | James Postell Douglas | Democrat | 1876 (Prior: 1870–1872) |
| 8 | Christopher C. Francis | Democrat | 1876 |
| 9 | Charles D. Grace | Democrat | 1876 |
| 10 | B. D. Martin | Democrat | 1876 |
| 11 | William Blassingame | Democrat | 1876 |
| 12 | Finis E. Piner | Democrat | 1876 |
| 13 | Robert S. Guy | Democrat | 1876 |
| 14 | John R. Henry | Democrat | 1876 |
| 15 | Thomas J. McCulloch | Democrat | 1876 |
| 16 | Tillman Smith | Democrat | 1876 |
| 17 | Walter Moses Burton | Republican | 1874 |
| 18 | John Thomas Brady | | 1876 |
| 19 | Andrew Phelps McCormick | Republican | 1876 |
| 20 | John W. Carroll | Democrat | 1876 |
| 21 | William M. Brown | Democrat | 1876 |
| 22 | John W. Moore | Democrat | 1876 (Prior: 1861–1865) |
| 23 | Thomas Ball | Democrat | 1876 |
| 24 | John D. Stephens | Democrat | 1876 |
| 25 | Alexander Watkins Terrell | Democrat | 1876 |
| 26 | William Hamilton Ledbetter | Democrat | 1874 |
| 27 | Wells Thompson | Democrat | 1876 |
| 28 | William Henry Crain | Democrat | 1876 |
| 29 | John Salmon "Rip" Ford | Democrat | 1876 (Prior: 1851–1853) |
| 30 | James Harvey McLeary | Democrat | 1876 |
| 31 | Leonidas Jefferson Storey | Democrat | 1876 |

=== House of Representatives ===
- Robert D. Allison
- Benjamin M. Baker
- Decimus et Ultimus Barziza
- Thomas Reuben Bonner
- John Hughes Cochran
- Nicholas Henry Darnell
- Thomas Mason Dennis
- Caleb Jackson Garrison
- John Summerfield Griffith
- William H. Holland
- Alexander Horton
- William W. Lang
- Norton Moses
- George Pickett
- Meshack Roberts
- William Long Rogers
- Henry Sneed
- Elias Charles Stuart
- Thomas Towles
- John Quitman Wall
- Allen W. Wilder
- Charles Louis Wurzbach
- William Hubbel Price

Logan Henderson McCorkle, Sulphur Springs

Representative Wilder won a closely contested election, but House Democrats contended that some votes were illegal and seated his Democratic opponent instead.

== Membership changes ==
| District | Outgoing Senator | Reason for Vacancy | Successor | Date of Successor's Installation |
|---|---|---|---|---|
| District 16 | Tillman Smith | Smith resigned November 19, 1876. | James R. Burnett | January 14, 1879 |
| District 28 | William Henry Crain | Crain resigned August 20, 1877. | Ellsberry R. Lane | January 14, 1879 |

- Sworn in at the beginning of the Sixteenth Texas Legislature.
