= Eddie Brown =

Eddie Brown may refer to:

== Arts and entertainment ==
- Eddie Brown (dancer) (1918–1992), American dancer
- Eddie Brown (born 1941), American singer and music producer of the duo Joe and Eddie
- Eddie Brown (musician) (1932–1984), American Motown percussionist
- Eddie Brown, Jamaican banjo player who recorded with Stanley Motta
- "Eddie Brown", an alternative title of The Brothers Four's song "Sama Kama Wacky Brown"

== Sports ==
=== Association football ===
- Eddie Brown (footballer, born 1927) (1927–1996), English footballer
- Eddie Brown (footballer, born 2000), English footballer
- Eddy Brown (1926–2012), English footballer

=== Gridiron football ===
- Eddie Brown (Canadian football) (born 1966), American slotback in the Canadian Football League
- Eddie Brown (arena football) (born 1969), American arena football player
- Eddie Brown (safety) (born 1952), American football defensive back
- Eddie Brown (wide receiver) (born 1962), American football wide receiver

=== Other sports ===
- Eddie Brown (Australian footballer) (1877–1934), Australian rules footballer
- Eddie Brown (baseball) (1891–1956), American baseball outfielder
- Eddie Brown (cricketer) (1911–1978), English cricketer
- Eddie Brown (cyclist), Scottish cyclist

== Others ==
- Eddie C. Brown (born 1940), American investment manager, entrepreneur and philanthropist

== See also ==
- Edward Brown (disambiguation)
