= Edward Browne =

Edward Browne may refer to:

== Politicians ==
- Edward E. Browne (1868–1945), U.S. Representative from Wisconsin
- Edward Browne (MP) (fl. 1584–1586) for Gatton
- Edward Browne (Irish politician), Irish senator
- Edward L. Browne (1830–1925), member of the Wisconsin State Senate

== Others ==
- Edward Browne (physician) (1644–1708), English physician, President of the Royal College of Physicians 1704–1707
- Edward Harold Browne (1811–1891), Bishop of the Church of England
- Edward Stevenson Browne (1852–1907), English recipient of the Victoria Cross
- Edward Granville Browne (1862–1926), British orientalist
- Edward Browne (priest) (1699–1777), Anglican priest in Ireland

== See also ==
- Edward Brown (disambiguation)
