= 11th Texas Cavalry Regiment =

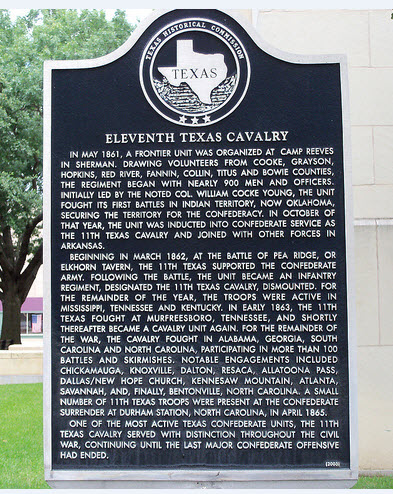
- 11th Texas Cavalry Historical Marker, Sherman, Texas
- Active: 2 October 1861 – 26 April 1865
- Country: Confederate States of America
- Allegiance: Confederate States of America, Texas
- Branch: Confederate States Army
- Type: Cavalry and Infantry
- Size: Regiment
- Engagements: American Civil War; Battle of Chustenahlah (1861); Battle of Pea Ridge (1862); Battle of Richmond (1862); Battle of Stones River (1862–63); Battle of Chickamauga (1863); Wheeler's October 1863 Raid; Atlanta campaign (1864); Sherman's March to the Sea (1864); Carolinas campaign (1865)

Commanders
- Notable commanders: Col. George R. Reeves

The 11th Texas Cavalry Regiment was a unit of mounted volunteers that fought in the Confederate States Army during the American Civil War. The regiment organized in October 1861 and fought at Chustenahlah against pro-Union Native Americans that winter and at Pea Ridge against Union troops in March 1862. The regiment dismounted to fight at First Corinth, Richmond, and Stones River in 1862. After being remounted, the 11th Texas Cavalry fought at Chickamauga, in Wheeler's October 1863 Raid, in the Atlanta campaign, in Sherman's March to the Sea, and in the Carolinas campaign. When the Confederate army surrendered in April 1865, its remaining soldiers dispersed.

== See also ==
- List of Texas Civil War Confederate units
