= 2012 Texas Senate election =

- November 6, 2012

All 31 seats in the Texas Senate 16 seats needed for a majority
	Majority party	Minority party	Third party
Party	Republican	Democratic	Libertarian
Last election	19 seats, 70.65%	12 seats, 22.71%	0 seats, 6.61%
Seats before	19	12	0
Seats won	19	12	0
Seat change	Steady	Steady	Steady
Popular vote	4,327,863	2,272,085	355,249
Percentage	62.65%	32.76%	5.12%
Swing	▼8.00%	▲10.05%	▼1.49%
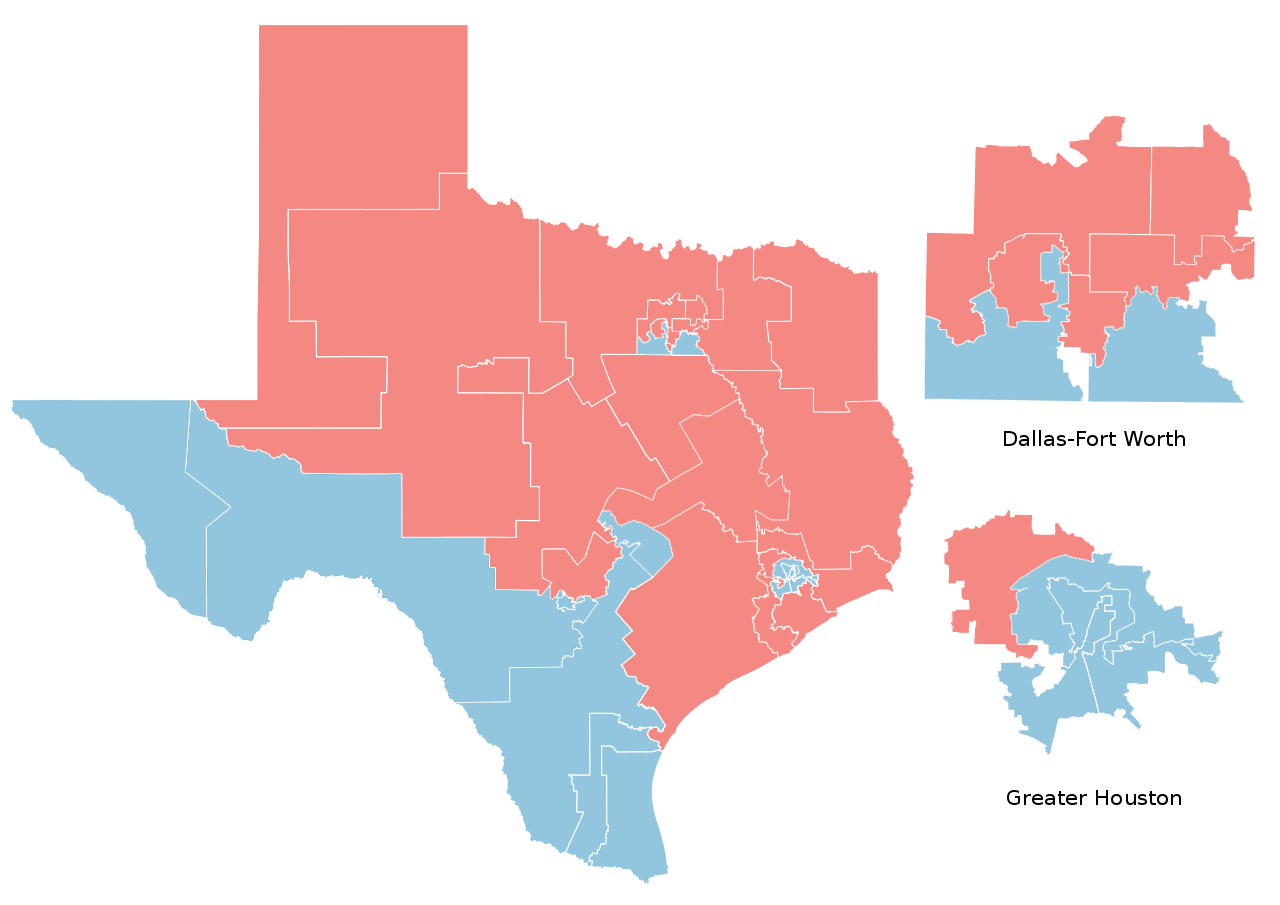
- Election results Republican hold Democratic hold
President Pro Tempore before election
Republican
Elected President Pro Tempore
Republican

The 2012 Texas Senate elections took place as part of the biennial United States elections. Texas voters elected state senators in all 31 State Senate districts. The winners of this election served in the 83rd Texas Legislature, with seats apportioned among the 2010 United States census.

== Background ==
The Republican Party had held the Senate since the 1996 elections. Most observers, as well as the national parties, viewed Texas as a safe red state, as Republican candidates had swept statewide elections since 1998. Republicans reached a new zenith after the 2010 elections, when backlash to the presidency of Barack Obama kept the Senate firmly in their control and led to a record number of victories in the House of Representatives. As the first election after the 2010 United States census, all Senate districts had to be redrawn to account for population changes over the preceding decade. Typically, State senators serve four-year terms in the Texas State Senate; however, all Senate seats come up for election in the cycle after decennial redistricting. Due to this, senators elected in 2010 served only two-year terms, and half of the senators elected in this election served two-year terms, coming up for re-election again in 2014. To claim control of the chamber from Republicans, the Democrats needed to gain four seats.

=== Challenges to Republican-drawn Senate map ===
Republicans had sole control over redistricting the state's U.S. House delegation and both state legislative chambers for the 2012 elections. The 10th Senate District, the most-altered in the body, belonged to Wendy Davis (D-Fort Worth), whose seat was drawn to add more Republican voters from greater Tarrant County while placing voters from Democratic areas out of the district. However, the proposed Senate map for 2012 was challenged under Section 5 of the Voting Rights Act and in U.S. District Court for racial gerrymandering. The United States District Court for the Western District of Texas ruled with the plaintiffs and proposed its own example map, undoing the racial gerrymander in Senate District 10, and ordered the legislature to draw a new map based on its own. Ultimately, this election used boundaries made with input from both the Court and Republican legislators.

== Predictions ==
Source	Ranking	As of
Governing	Safe R	October 24, 2012

== Results ==
Republicans heavily invested in winning the 10th district, which was the only competitive district in the state. The race became one of the most expensive legislative races in the 2012 election cycle. Republicans ultimately failed to unseat Davis, however, and every other seat in the state remained safely with their respective parties, maintaining the balance of 19 Republicans and 12 Democrats in the Senate.

=== Statewide ===
Summary of the November 6, 2012 Texas Senate election results
Party	Candidates	Votes		Seats				
Party	Candidates	No.	%	Before	Up	Won	After	+/–
Republican	27	4,275,676	61.65%	19	19	19	19	Steady
Democratic	18	2,272,085	32.76%	12	12	12	12	Steady
Libertarian	12	355,249	5.12%	0	0	0	0	Steady
Green	2	31,840	0.46%	0	0	0	0	Steady
Write-in	1	966	0.00%	0	0	0	0	Steady
Total		6,987,503	100.00%	31	15	15	31	Steady

Popular vote
Republican	61.65%
Democratic	32.76%
Libertarian	5.12%
Green	0.46%
Write-in	0.00%

Senate seats won
Republican	61.29%
Democratic	38.71%

=== Close races ===
District	Winner	Margin
District 10	Democratic	2.24%

=== Results by district ===
District	Democratic		Republican		Others		Total		Result
District	Votes	%	Votes	%	Votes	%	Votes	%	Result
District 1	84,262	28.63%	210,091	71.37%	-	-	294,353	100.00%	Republican hold
District 2	-	-	172,451	100.00%	-	-	172,451	100.00%	Republican hold
District 3	-	-	226,978	100.00%	-	-	226,978	100.00%	Republican hold
District 4	-	-	216,076	86.25%	34,445	13.75%	250,521	100.00%	Republican hold
District 5	-	-	182,554	77.14%	54,107	22.86%	236,661	100.00%	Republican hold
District 6	93,289	70.95%	38,201	29.05%	-	-	131,490	100.00%	Democratic hold
District 7	90,793	31.60%	196,526	68.40%	-	-	287,319	100.00%	Republican hold
District 8	99,101	34.60%	178,238	62.29%	8,899	3.11%	286,147	100.00%	Republican hold
District 9	89,255	38.21%	136,288	58.35%	8,034	3.44%	233,577	100.00%	Republican hold
District 10	147,103	51.12%	140,656	48.88%	-	-	287,759	100.00%	Democratic hold
District 11	93,227	33.98%	181,106	66.02%	-	-	274,333	100.00%	Republican hold
District 12	-	-	203,988	83.41%	40,570	16.59%	244,558	100.00%	Republican hold
District 13	181,866	100.00%	-	-	-	-	181,866	100.00%	Democratic hold
District 14	212,527	80.29%	-	-	52,187	19.71%	264,714	100.00%	Democratic hold
District 15	135,822	62.34%	82,038	37.66%	-	-	217,860	100.00%	Democratic hold
District 16	-	-	181,746	100.00%	-	-	181,746	100.00%	Republican hold
District 17	-	-	185,429	77.68%	53,278	22.32%	238,707	100.00%	Republican hold
District 18	-	-	211,230	100.00%	-	-	211,230	100.00%	Republican hold
District 19	122,214	59.40%	83,522	40.60%	-	-	205,736	100.00%	Democratic hold
District 20	112,629	61.53%	70,409	38.47%	-	-	183,038	100.00%	Democratic hold
District 21	129,894	67.63%	56,032	29.17%	6,147	3.20%	192,073	100.00%	Democratic hold
District 22	-	-	188,544	85.57%	31,786	14.43%	220,330	100.00%	Republican hold
District 23	187,407	81.90%	41,429	18.10%	-	-	228,836	100.00%	Democratic hold
District 24	-	-	209,319	100.00%	-	-	209,319	100.00%	Republican hold
District 25	121,906	34.42%	232,261	65.58%	-	-	354,167	100.00%	Republican hold
District 26	141,040	80.33%	-	-	34,043	19.67%	175,583	100.00%	Democratic hold
District 27	113,542	100.00%	-	-	-	-	113,542	100.00%	Democratic hold
District 28	-	-	183,619	86.39%	28,932	13.61%	212,551	100.00%	Republican hold
District 29	116,208	68.60%	53,190	31.40%	-	-	169,398	100.00%	Democratic hold
District 30	-	-	217,877	86.12%	35,127	13.88%	253,004	100.00%	Republican hold
District 31	-	-	195,878	100.00%	-	-	195,878	100.00%	Republican hold
Total	2,272,085	32.76%	4,275,676	61.65%	387,555	5.59%	6,935,316	100.00%	Source:
