= Thomas Bonner =

Thomas Bonner may refer to:

- Thomas N. Bonner (1923–2003), American historian of medicine and university president
- Thomas Reuben Bonner, American jurist and speaker of the Texas House of Representatives
- Tom Bonner (born 1988), Scottish footballer.

== See also ==
- Tom W. Bonner (1910–1961), American physicist
