= 16th Texas Legislature =

The 16th Texas Legislature met from January 14 to July 9, 1879 in its regular session and one called session. All members of the House of Representatives and about half of the members of the Senate were elected in 1878 General Election.

== Sessions ==
- 16th Regular session: January 14–April 24, 1879
- 16th First called session: June 10–July 9, 1879

== Officers ==
=== Senate ===
Lieutenant Governor
Joseph Draper Sayers, Democrat
President pro tempore
Edwin Hobby, Democrat, Regular session, ad interim
Leonidas Jefferson Storey, Democrat, First called session

=== House of Representatives ===
Speaker of the House
John Hughes Cochran, Democrat

== Members ==
Members of the Sixteenth Texas Legislature as of the beginning of the Regular Session, January 14, 1879:

=== Senate ===
District	Senator	Party	Took office
1	Edwin Hobby	Democrat	1874
2	Peyton Forbes Edwards		1876
3	John W. Motley		1876
4	Walter Riptoe	Republican	1876
5	William H. Tilson		1879
6	William Jesse Swain		1879
7	John Martin Duncan		1879
8	John Young Gooch		1879
9	Charles D. Grace		1876
10	John C. Buchanan		1879
11	William Blassingame		1876
12	William D. Lair	Democrat	1879 (Prior: 1861–1863)
13	Robert S. Guy		1876
14	Francis Marion Martin	Democrat	1879 (Prior: 1859–1861)
15	Thomas J. McCulloch		1876
16	James R. Burnett		1876
17	Walter Moses Burton	Republican	1874
18	Charles Stewart		1879
19	Andrew Phelps McCormick	Republican	1876
20	William Kercheval Homan		1879
21	William M. Brown		1876
22	John W. Moore	Democrat	1876 (Prior: 1861–1865)
23	William R. Shannon	Democrat	1879 (Prior: 1865–1867)
24	Jewett H. Davenport		1879 (Prior: 1874–1876)
25	Alexander Watkins Terrell	Democrat	1876
26	William Hamilton Ledbetter		1874
27	Samuel C. Patton		1879
28	Ellsberry R. Lane		1876
29	John Salmon "Rip" Ford	Democrat	1876 (Prior: 1851–1853)
30	Augustus W. Houston	Democrat	1879
31	Leonidas Jefferson Storey	Democrat	1876

=== House of Representatives ===
- Benjamin M. Baker
- Thomas Beck
- William Bell
- Guy Morrison Bryan
- William Clemens
- John Hughes Cochran
- James N. English
- R. J. Evans
- George Finlay
- Jacob E. Freeman
- Samuel Frost
- Caleb Jackson Garrison
- Charles Reese Gibson
- Bedford G. Guy
- William Kercheval Homan
- Elias Mayes
- George Pickett
- Joseph Benjamin Polley
- Alonzo Sledge
- Ashbel Smith
- Felix Ezell Smith
- M. D. K. Taylor
- Robert H. Taylor
- Benjamin Franklin Williams
- Charles Louis Wurzbach

== Membership Changes ==
District	Outgoing Senator	Reason for Vacancy	Successor	Date of Successor's Installation
District 1	Edwin Hobby	Hobby resigned July 10, 1879.	Vacant	
District 2	Peyton Forbes Edwards	resigned December 4, 1871.	Vacant	
District 15	Thomas J. McCulloch	McCulloch resigned September 3, 1879.	Vacant	
District 16	James R. Burnett	Burnett resigned October 9, 1879.	John T. Buchanan	after February 17, 1880
District 19	Andrew Phelps McCormick	McCormick resigned April 12, 1879.	Robert Gould Street	June 10, 1879
District 20	William Kercheval Homan	Homan resigned July 9, 1879.	William Kercheval Homan	after February 17, 1880
District 29	John Salmon "Rip" Ford	Ford resigned August 30, 1879.	Vacant	

- District 16: Buchanan was elected in special election February 17, 1880
- District 20: Homan was reelected in special election February 17, 1880
