= Jacob Freeman =

Jacob Freeman may refer to:

- Jacob E. Freeman (1841–1900), American politician
- Jake Freeman (born 1980), American hammer thrower
