= Henry Sneed =

Texas politician

Henry S. Sneed, last name sometimes spelled Snead, was enslaved before becoming a farmer and state legislator in Texas. He was elected to the Texas House of Representatives in 1876 from Waller County, Texas, Wharton County Texas, and Fort Bend County, Texas. He was one of 3 African Americans in Texas 15th legislature.

He was born in Marshall, Texas. His wife's name was Emma. He was photographed with a mustache.

== See also ==
- Fifteenth Texas Legislature
- African American officeholders from the end of the Civil War until before 1900
