= Eugene Miller (Texas politician) =

American politician (1899–1948)

Eugene Miller (January 25, 1899 – July 8, 1948) was a Democratic politician in the Texas Senate for six years.

He represented Texas Senate, District 22. He was President pro tempore of the Texas Senate in the Forty-first Texas Legislature 1929–1931. He was a member of the Texas House of Representatives from 1921 to 1925.
