= Cole Hefner =

Texas politician

Member of the Texas House of Representatives from the 5th district
- Incumbent
- Assumed office January 10, 2017
- Preceded by: Bryan Hughes

Personal details
- Born: November 13, 1980 (age 45) Pittsburg, Texas, U.S.
- Party: Republican
- Spouse: Kerri
- Occupation: Businessman
- Website: www.colehefner.com

Joseph Cole Hefner, known as Cole Hefner (born November 13, 1980), is a Republican member of the Texas House of Representatives from Mount Pleasant, Texas. He was first elected in 2016 to represent the 5th District and assumed office in January 2017. He succeeded Bryan Hughes, who was instead elected to the Texas Senate.

Hefner won a second legislative term in the general election held on November 6, 2018. With 44,264 votes (79.3 percent), he defeated Democrat Bill Liebbe, who polled 11,540 votes (20.7 percent).

Texas House of Representatives
Preceded by Bryan Hughes	Member of the Texas House of Representatives from the 5th district 2017–present	Incumbent
