= Walter Riptoe =

American politician

Member of the Texas Senate from the 4th district
- In office April 18, 1876 – January 11, 1881
- Preceded by: Winfield B. Stirman
- Succeeded by: Robert L. Hightower

Personal details
- Born: March 30, 1838 Montgomery, Alabama, U.S.
- Died: August 15, 1886 (aged 48)
- Party: Republican

Walter E. Riptoe (March 30, 1838 – August 15, 1886) was a preacher and state legislator in Texas. A Republican, he served two terms in the Texas Senate during the Fifteenth Texas Legislature and Sixteenth Texas Legislature from 1876 to 1881, representing Marshall (Harrison) County. The Texas State Preservation Board has a photograph of him.

He was born in Montgomery, Alabama. He later moved to in Texas in January 1850 and lived in Rusk County until the end of the war.

Marshall Junior High School students, including his descendant did a history project on him in 2018 and described him as a carpenter and teacher as well as a civil rights advocate.

== See also ==
- African American officeholders from the end of the Civil War until before 1900
