= Henry Brevard Davidson =

Confederate general in the American Civil War

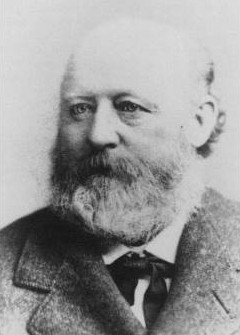
- Brig. Gen. Henry B. Davidson
- Born: January 28, 1831; Shelbyville, Tennessee
- Died: March 4, 1899 (aged 68); Livermore, California
- Burial place: Mountain View Cemetery
- Military career
- Allegiance: United States of America; Confederate States of America
- Branch: United States Army; Confederate States Army
- Service years: 1846–1847, 1853–1861 (USA); 1861–1865 (CSA)
- Rank: Captain (USA); Brigadier General (CSA)
- Commands: Cavalry brigade in the Army of Tennessee
- Conflicts: American Civil War: Battle of Chickamauga; Atlanta campaign; Valley Campaigns of 1864
- Other work: Deputy sheriff, civil engineer, railroad agent

Henry Brevard Davidson (January 28, 1831 – March 4, 1899) was a United States Army officer and Confederate general during the American Civil War. At the outbreak of the war, he resigned his commission and served in various staff positions in the Confederate States Army. On August 18, 1863, he was promoted to brigadier general and first commanded brigades of cavalry in the Western Theater, particularly in Tennessee and Georgia. In 1864, he was transferred to Virginia and served in the Valley Campaigns of 1864. At the end of the war, he served under General Joseph E. Johnston in the Carolina Campaign. After the war, he became a civil engineer in California and in 1887 was deputy secretary of state in California. Later in life, he was an agent for the Southern Pacific Railroad in Danville, California.

== Early life and career ==
Davidson was born in rural Shelbyville, Tennessee, on January 28, 1831. He was educated in the common schools. Following the outbreak of the Mexican–American War, Davidson joined the 1st Tennessee Volunteer Infantry as a private in June 1846. He was decorated for gallantry at the Battle of Monterrey and promoted to sergeant before being discharged May 1847. He received an appointment to the United States Military Academy at West Point, New York, due to his meritorious Mexican–American War service, and graduated from the academy in 1853, ranking 33rd in his class. Among his classmates were future Confederate generals John S. Bowen, John Bell Hood, and John R. Chambliss, Jr.

He subsequently received a brevet commission as a second lieutenant in the First Dragoons. Davidson was promoted to first lieutenant on November 30, 1856. Between 1855 and 1858, he served in Oregon and the New Mexico Territory as part of the forces often involved in engagements with Native American Indians. On December 6, 1858, he transferred to the quartermaster department where he was regimental quartermaster.

== Civil War ==
Following the secession of several Southern states and the outbreak of hostilities in early 1861, Davidson resigned from his recent commission as a captain in the U.S. Army (he had been promoted to that rank on May 13 and was formally dropped from the army for being AWOL on July 30, 1861). Meanwhile, he traveled to the South and entered the service of the Confederate States of America as a captain on March 16, 1861, and as a major in April 1861. He served in the Adjutant General's office and then on the Inspector General's staff. He was a staff officer for several leading generals including John B. Floyd, Albert S. Johnston, Simon Bolivar Buckner and William W. Mackall. He was promoted to colonel and was with Brigadier General Mackall among the forces which surrendered following the Battle of Island Number Ten on April 7, 1862. After being exchanged on August 27, 1862, he was appointed as the colonel in command of the military post at Staunton, Virginia, in the Shenandoah Valley.

For much of the rest of the war, he was a cavalry commander. He participated in several raids and mounted actions including Wheeler's October 1863 Raid. In August 1863 he was promoted to the rank of brigadier general. Davidson fought at the Battle of Chickamauga on September 19–20, 1863. He was given command of a cavalry brigade at Rome, Georgia, in Wharton's Division of Wheeler's Cavalry Corps from October 1863 through early 1864. His brigade served in parts of the Atlanta campaign. Before the conclusion of that campaign, Davidson was sent to Virginia where on September 27, 1864, he took command of a brigade of cavalry attached to the division of Brigadier General Lunsford L. Lomax during the Valley Campaigns of 1864. He commanded the Cavalry Brigade, Valley District, Army of Northern Virginia from January to March 1865 when the Confederate Valley force under Lieutenant General Jubal Early was effectively destroyed at the Battle of Waynesboro, Virginia, on March 2, 1865. Davidson surrendered with General Joseph E. Johnston's force at Greensboro, North Carolina in April 1865. He was paroled on May 1, 1865.

== Postwar ==
After the war, Davidson moved to New Orleans, Louisiana, where he served as a deputy sheriff until 1867. He moved to California in 1868. From 1878 to 1886, he was an inspector of United States public works at San Pedro, California. He was appointed a Deputy to William C. Hendricks, the Secretary of State of California, in 1887. He also was a civil engineer and, later in life, railroad agent for the Southern Pacific Railroad at Danville, California.

Henry Brevard Davidson died at Livermore, California, and is buried at Mountain View Cemetery in Oakland, California.

== See also ==
- List of American Civil War generals (Confederate)
