= Brian Birdwell =

American politician

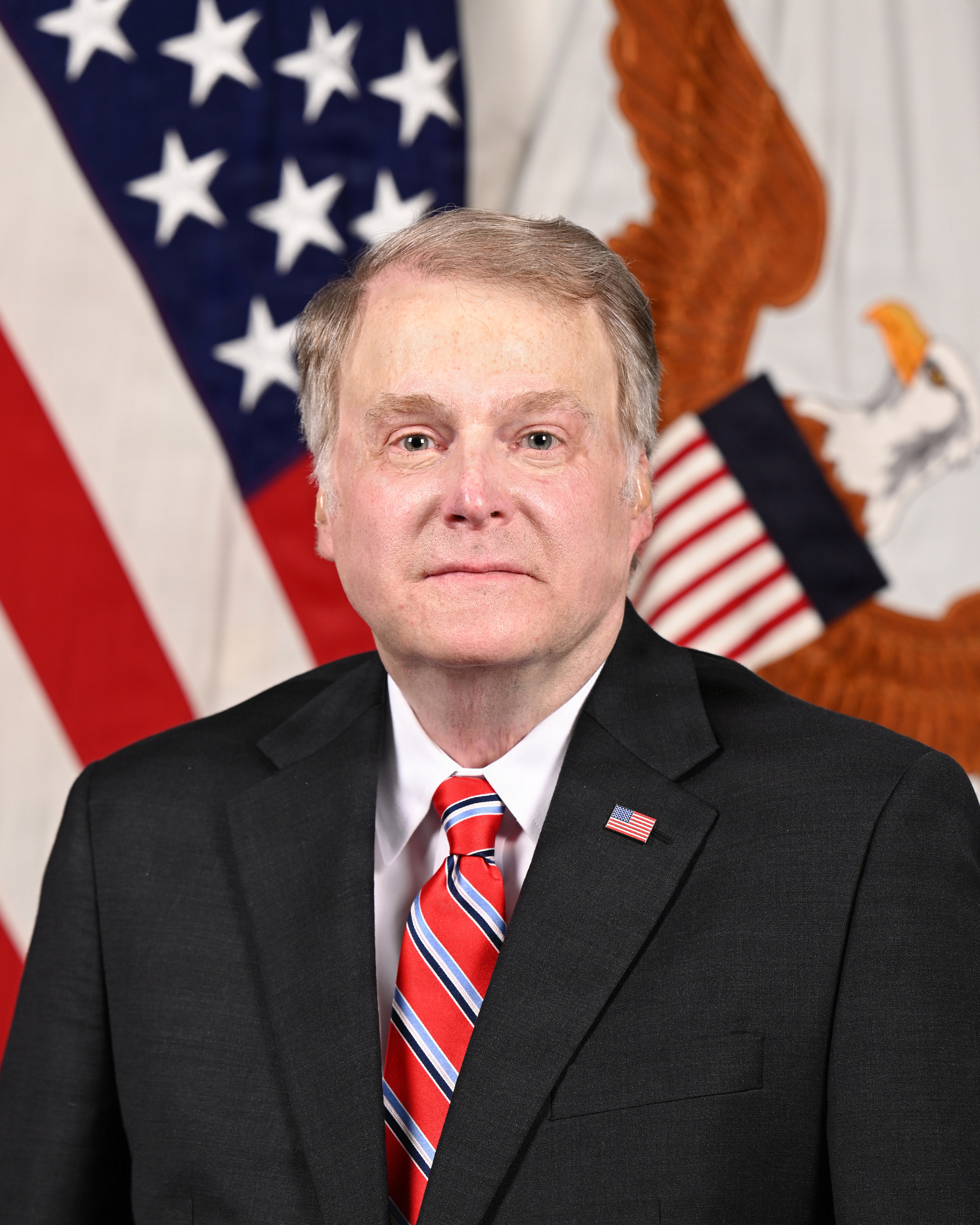
- Official portrait, 2026

Assistant Secretary of Defense for Sustainment
- Incumbent
- Assumed office May 29, 2026
- President: Donald Trump
- Preceded by: Christopher Lowman

President pro tempore of the Texas Senate
- In office January 12, 2021 – May 31, 2021
- Preceded by: Joan Huffman
- Succeeded by: Donna Campbell

Member of the Texas Senate from the 22nd district
- In office July 2, 2010 – May 26, 2026
- Preceded by: Kip Averitt
- Succeeded by: David Cook (elect)

Personal details
- Born: Brian Douglas Birdwell; November 3, 1961 (age 65) Fort Worth, Texas, U.S.
- Party: Republican
- Children: 1
- Education: Lamar University (BS); University of Missouri, Kansas City (MPA)

Military service
- Allegiance: United States
- Branch: United States Army
- Service years: 1984–2001
- Rank: Lieutenant Colonel
- Awards: Purple Heart; Legion of Merit

Brian Douglas Birdwell (born November 3, 1961) is an American politician serving as the Assistant Secretary of Defense for Sustainment since 2026. A member of the Republican Party, he served in the Texas Senate from 2010 to 2026.

== Early life and education ==
Born in Fort Worth, Texas, Birdwell earned a Bachelor of Science degree in criminology from Lamar University in 1984 and a Master of Public Administration from the University of Missouri–Kansas City in 1996.

== Career ==
On September 11, 2001, Birdwell was working as a military aide to with the United States Army at The Pentagon. Birdwell had just left the restroom, and was returning to his office, when American Airlines Flight 77 crashed into the building. He recalled being "tossed around like a rag doll" during the impact, and collapsing when he realised that he was on fire. The building's sprinkler system extinguished the fire on his body, and he managed to make his way to help. Four people carried Birdwell to a triage area, where he was administered with morphine and an IV. Both had to be administered through his feet, due to the extent of the burns on the rest of his body. He was taken to Georgetown University Hospital to be treated, and was later flown to the Washington Hospital Center.

Birdwell suffered 60% total body burns, with more than 40% of them being third degree. His lungs were also badly damaged by smoke inhalation. He spent 92 days admitted to hospital, and underwent more than 39 surgeries.

Two days after being injured, Birdwell met President George W. Bush. Rob Maness, a United States Air Force officer who rescued Birdwell, learned about Birdwell's identity only when they met at the 2016 Republican National Convention.

On July 1, 2004 Birdwell retired from the military, and founded Face the Fire Ministries, a charitable organisation that supports burn survivors and their families.

He holds a Purple Heart and a Legion of Merit.

== Political positions ==
=== Elections ===
He defeated David Sibley in a June 22, 2010 special election, replacing Kip Averitt.

Birdwell won the 2010 general election unopposed.

=== Legislation sponsored ===
In February 2017, Birdwell sponsored Senate Joint Resolution 2, which calls for a convention to propose amendments to the United States Constitution. The resolution "seeks amendments that place restraints on the federal budget and check power and enact term limits for U.S. officials." Senate Joint Resolution 2 was passed by both chambers of the Texas Legislature. In May 2017, Birdwell sponsored a bill outlining the duties and limits of Texas delegates should a convention of states occur. It was approved by the Texas House and sent to Texas Governor Greg Abbott.

=== Immigration ===
Birdwell was the only Republican who voted against Texas Senate Bill 4 (2023), which allows state officials to arrest and deport migrants who enter the state illegally.

== Personal life ==
He has one son with his wife.

Texas Senate
Preceded by Joan Huffman	President pro tempore of the Texas Senate; 2021	Succeeded by Donna Campbell
