= Bob Glasgow =

American politician (1942–2023)

Member of the Texas Senate from the 22nd district
- In office January 13, 1981 – January 12, 1993
- Preceded by: Tom Creighton
- Succeeded by: Jane Nelson

Personal details
- Born: Robert Glasgow; February 28, 1942
- Died: September 22, 2023 (aged 81)
- Party: Democratic
- Education: Tarleton State University (BA); University of Texas School of Law (JD)
- Profession: Politician, lawyer
- Awards: Ig Nobel Prize (1994)

Robert Glasgow (February 28, 1942 – September 22, 2023) was an American Democratic Party politician from Stephenville, Texas, who held office as a member of the Senate of Texas. Glasgow was trained as a lawyer. He was the winner of the 1994 Ig Nobel Prize in Chemistry for sponsoring a 1989 drug law that made it illegal to buy laboratory glassware without a permit.

Glasgow also served as President Pro Tem of the Senate, serving on many occasions as Governor of Texas and was honored in 1991 as Governor for a Day at a statewide ceremony at the State Capitol in Austin, Texas.

Glasgow received his B.A. from Tarleton State University and his J.D. from the University of Texas School of Law. He was a member of the Tarleton Purple Association, Erath County Bar Association, Hood County Bar Association, Parker County Bar Association, Tarrant County Bar Association, American Bar Association, and Texas Bar Association. He was an active Freemason, and served for 30 years as parliamentarian for the Grand Lodge of Texas AF & AM.

Bob Glasgow died on September 22, 2023, at the age of 81.

== See also ==
- List of Ig Nobel Prize winners

Texas Senate
| Preceded by Tom Creighton | Member of the Texas Senate from the 22nd district January 13, 1981 – January 12, 1993 | Succeeded by Jane Nelson |
