= Elias Mayes =

American politician (1831–1910)

Elias Mayes (February 15, 1831 – January 5, 1910) was an American politician, farmer, and Methodist Episcopal minister who served as a member of the Texas House of Representatives. He was elected as a Republican to the Texas Sixteenth and Twenty-first legislatures and represented Brazos County.

== Early life ==
Mayes was on February 15, 1831, in Conecuh County, Alabama, the son of Louis and Gillette Mayes.

== Legislative career ==
In 1863, he moved to Montgomery County, Texas. By 1866, he was residing in Grimes County. He moved to Brazos County by 1877, where he was elected to the Texas House of Representatives. While in the legislature, Mayes opposed racial segregation legislation that would have mandated segregated transportation. During his time serving in the Texas Legislature, he also received support from the Greenback Party.

== Personal life ==
Mayes and his wife Maggie resided in Clarksville, Texas. She helped establish the first school there.

== See also ==
- Sixteenth Texas Legislature
