= Thomas Reuben Bonner =

American politician (1838–1891)

Speaker of the Texas House of Representatives
- In office April 18, 1876 – January 14, 1879
- Preceded by: Guy M. Bryan
- Succeeded by: John Hughes Cochran

Member of the Texas House of Representatives
- In office April 18, 1876 – January 14, 1879
- Constituency: 15th district
- In office August 6, 1866 – February 7, 1870
- Constituency: 11th district

Personal details
- Born: Thomas Reuben Bonner; September 11, 1838 Holmes County, Mississippi, U.S.
- Died: August 30, 1891 (aged 52) Tyler, Texas, U.S.
- Party: Democratic

Thomas Reuben Bonner was an American jurist and Speaker of the Texas House of Representatives for the 15th Texas Legislature. Throughout his career, he was also a ferry operator, journalist, soldier, and banker.

== Biography ==
Bonner was born in Holmes County, Mississippi on September 11, 1838. He moved to Marshall, Texas with his family in 1849. He began working as an apprentice for the Cherokee Sentinel at the age of 12. He worked for the paper for four years while operating his family's ferry. Bonner served in the American Civil War, raising a company in 1862 which joined forces with the 18th Texas Infantry Regiment. He fought in the Battle of Saline, after which he was promoted to colonel. After the war, he moved back to Marshall where he continued his work as a printer and also studied law. He was admitted to the State Bar of Texas in 1867 and moved to Tyler, Texas in 1872.

After moving to Tyler, Bonner worked as a banker, railroad director, and financier. In 1876, Bonner was elected to the Texas Legislature and was Speaker of the Texas House of Representatives.

== Personal life ==
Bonner was married twice and had two sons. He died on August 30, 1891. Bonner Elementary School in Tyler, Texas was named after him. He was a practicing Mason and the 37th Grand Master in Texas.
