= Edward Eagle Brown =

American attorney and businessman

- Born: 4 June 1885; Chicago, Illinois, USA
- Died: 1959 (aged 73–74)
- Education: Harvard
- Occupation: Attorney
- Years active: 1908–1959
- Known for: President of First National Bank of Chicago
- Spouse: Phyllis Wyatt
- Parent(s): Edward Osgood Brown; Helen Gertrude Eagle Brown

Edward Eagle Brown was an American attorney and businessman.

== Biography ==
Brown was born in Chicago, Illinois, to noted Chicago lawyer and Judge Edward Osgood Brown (5 August 1847, Salem Massachusetts – 8 December 1923) and Helen Gertrude Eagle (married 1884). Edward was the oldest of five children. He studied Law at Harvard University, graduating from the Law School in 1908.

Brown married Phyllis Wyatt, a newspaper columnist in 1913.

Brown died of a coronary thrombosis in 1959.

== Career ==
Brown was admitted to the Illinois bar in 1908. He joined the legal department of the First National Bank in 1910, became president of the bank in 1934, and was named chairman of the board in 1945. He served on many city boards and committees including the park district, the Association of Commerce, and was a trustee of the Newberry Library.
