= George R. Reeves =

American politician (1826–1882)

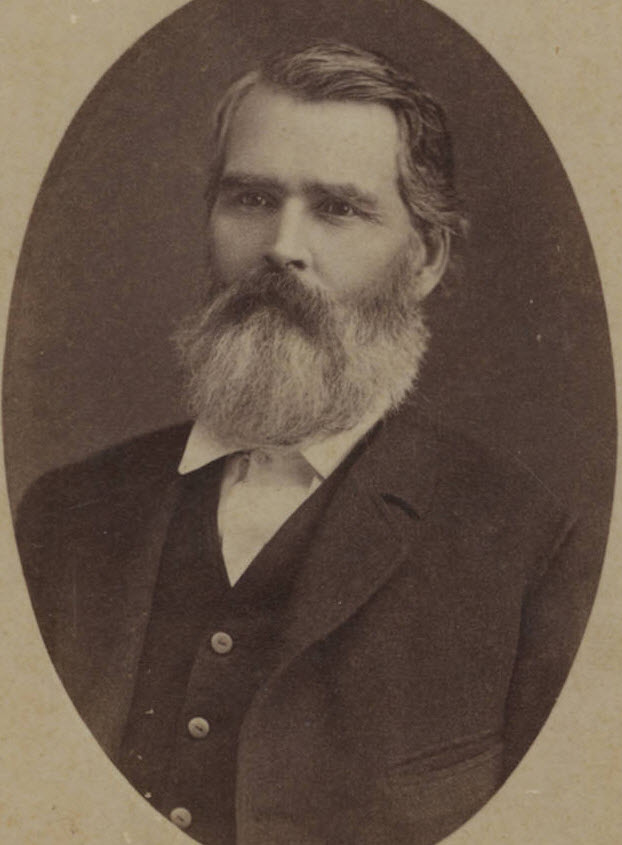
Robertson in c. 1881

George Robertson Reeves (January 3, 1826 – September 5, 1882) was a former Democratic Speaker of the House of the State of Texas and a Colonel in the Confederate States's 11th Texas Cavalry Regiment during the American Civil War. He also served as a pioneering member of Grayson County, Texas in which he also served as a Sheriff and tax collector. Reeves was the slaveowner of Bass Reeves before he escaped and became a lawman.

== Ancestry ==
The Reeves family was of English ancestry with Lord Robert Ryves (birth name Reve) (pronounced Reeves) (1490–1551), owning two primary estates, Randleston purchased in 1545 and Damory Court in Blandford Forum in 1548. George Reeves's 9th great-grandfather purchased both of these properties from Henry VIII of England as a member of the King's court. Lord Ryves made his living primarily in wool and textiles and is buried at St. Peter and St. Paul Church in Blandford Forum, Dorset, England.

Colonel Reeves's 5th great-grandfather, Timothy Rives, immigrated from England to Virginia, USA, in the mid-1600s, and within a few generations the family would leave Virginia and move west, settling in Tennessee. Oral history of the Reeves family indicates that Colonel Reeves's father, William Steele Reeves (1794–1872), was very close to, if not partially raised by his aunt, Charlotte Reeves and her husband, General James Robertson. General Robertson was commissioned as a United States military officer by President George Washington and was the co-founder of Fort Nashborough in Tennessee, later named Nashville. William is listed as a family member in the James Robertson family bible.

== Personal life ==
George Robertson Reeves was born in Hickman County, Tennessee. He married Jane Moore in 1844 while living in Arkansas, and between them had 12 children, with seven surviving his death in 1882. Jane Moore's great-great-grandfather was noted pioneer and co-founder of what is now the State of Tennessee, Colonel William Bean, an acquaintance of famous frontiersmen Daniel Boone and David Crockett. Bean was a founding member of the Watauga Association. Jane Moore's great-grandfather, Jesse Bean, was purported to have made several rifles from his black-smithing cave in Caney Hollow Branch, Franklin County, Tennessee and it is suspected that one of those rifles was used at the Battle of the Alamo and now resides in its museum. Moore's great uncle, Russell Bean, was the first white child born in what is now the state of Tennessee.

George Robertson Reeves donated 10 acres of land in Pottsboro, Texas to establish Georgetown Cemetery. His infant daughter, Mary, was the first to be buried there. One of Reeves's youngest sons, Alvin Robertson Reeves (1872–1946), was awarded the 1938 Pugsley Medal (Bronze) for his work as the director of the Division of State Parks in Oklahoma. Alvin Reeves was responsible for drafting the bill in the State of Oklahoma establishing the State Game and Fish Commission. As state game warden, Reeves purchased the first sites later to be designated state parks in Oklahoma.

== Career and accomplishments ==
In addition to farming, one of Reeves first occupations in Grayson County, Texas was that of tax collector (1848–1850). Public service suited him enough that he became the Sheriff of Grayson County, Texas in 1850 and served until 1854.

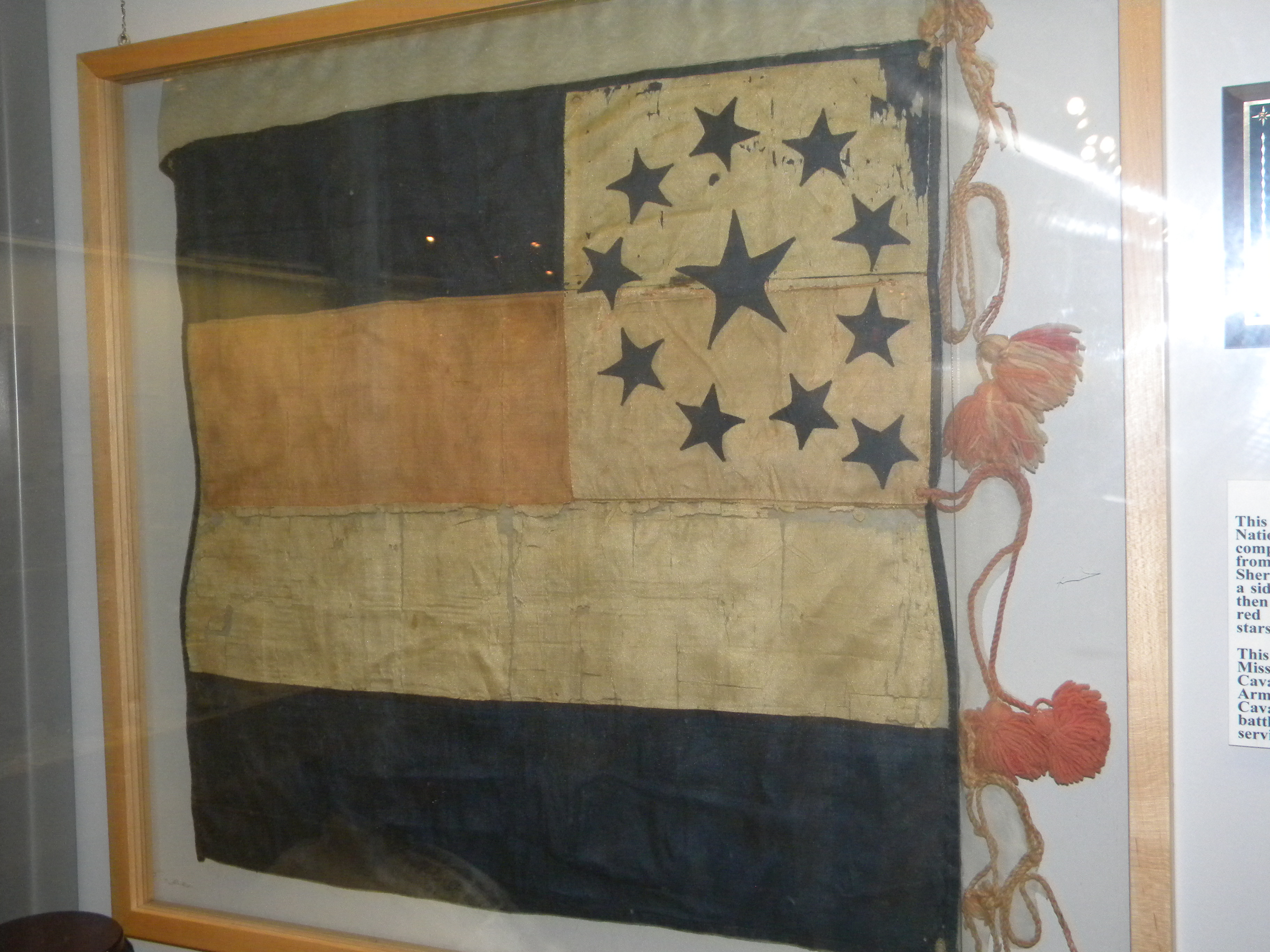
Original Flag of the Texas 11th Cavalry, Camp Reeves. Texas Civil War Museum, Ft. Worth, Texas

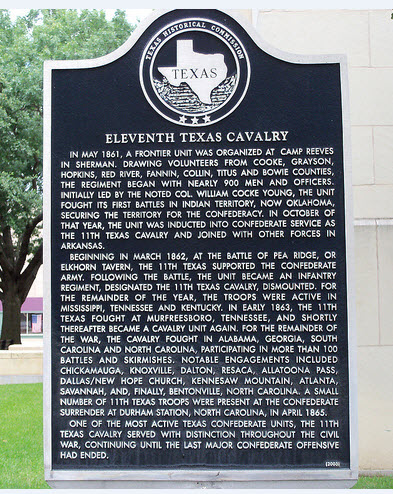
Historical Marker to 11th Texas Cavalry, Sherman, Texas

In May 1861 with the first shots of the Civil War at Fort Sumter less than a month old, Reeves organized a company within the 11th Regiment of the Texas Cavalry. Despite Grayson County voting against secession from the northern states, Texas as a whole voted to join the Confederacy. Reeves then donated land which would be used as Camp Reeves in support of the 11th Texas Cavalry and the Confederate States cause. Reeves, a captain, was promoted to Colonel after the death of the Regiment's first Commander, William C. Young. While the 11th had a handful of commanding officers, none served the 11th as its leader longer than Colonel George R. Reeves.

The Texas 11th Cavalry during the course of the war was involved in approximately 150 battles and skirmishes. One report said that as many as 500 men fought and less than 50 returned home at the end of the war. Among the biggest battles in which Reeves commanded the 11th Cav was the Chattanooga campaign, Wheeler's Raid through middle Tennessee, the Atlanta campaign, the Knoxville Campaign, and the Battle of Chickamauga, the last being the second bloodiest battle of the war behind only Gettysburg, and the largest battle victory for the Confederate States. The 11th Texas Cavalary, during most of its military history, reported to Reeves's good friend and fellow Texan, General John A. Wharton and up to Georgian Joseph "Fighting Joe" Wheeler.

Reeves resigned his commission shortly before the end of the war due to conflicts with commanding officers. His resignation letter stated differences between him and his Brigade Commander and that "I feel that I could more efficiently serve my country in some other capacity than the one I occupy now". His resignation was signed off by Major General Joseph Wheeler and eventually sent to the Secretary of War, James Seddon. Back in Texas Reeves became active in various post-war veteran's activities as well as the Old Settlers' Association in Grayson County. Reeves was elected to the Texas State Legislature in 1866, 1873, 1878, and 1880. In 1881 he became the Speaker of the House of Representatives for the State of Texas. Under his watch as Speaker of the House, the legislature helped to found the University of Texas in Austin.

== Death and legacy ==
In 1882 while visiting home, Reeves was bitten by a rabid dog. Reeves family oral history states that he saw a young child in danger from the animal and jumped off his horse to protect the young one when he was bitten. In his remaining days, Reeves was placed in a wooden shed padded with mattresses to protect him from the potential self-inflicted violent tendencies associated with the disease. He died of hydrophobia in September 1882, only three years before Louis Pasteur and Emile Roux discovered a vaccine for rabies. He is buried on the land he once owned, Georgetown Cemetery in Pottsboro, Texas.

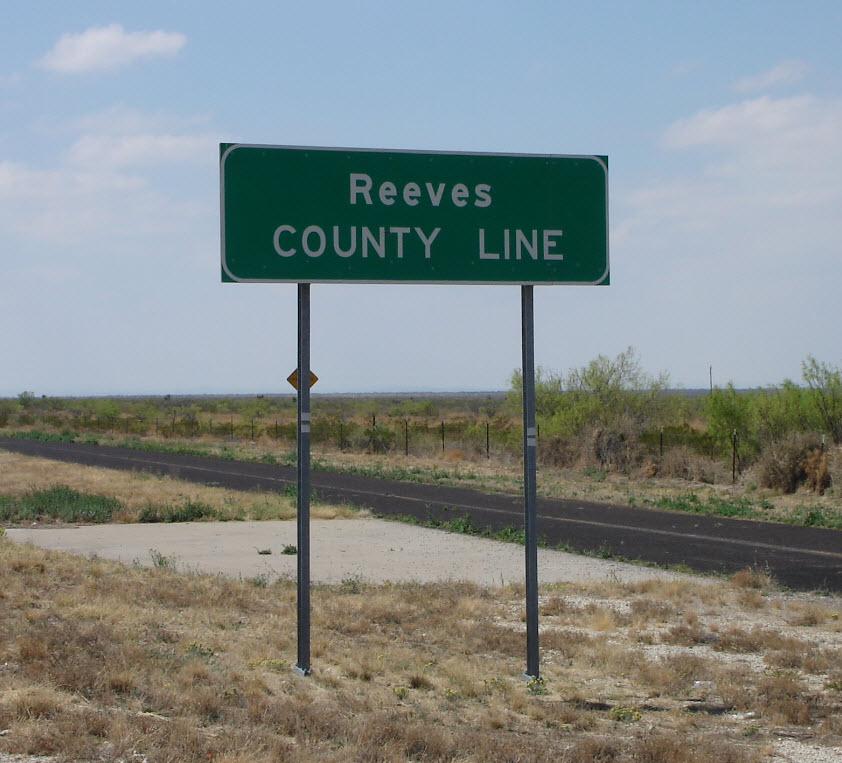
Highway Marker, Reeves County, Texas

Two years after his death, a 2,642 square mile county in West Texas was renamed for Reeves. Reeves County, Texas is the home to the city of Pecos, Texas its county seat. In addition, the Masonic Lodge in Pottsboro was named after the former politician and soldier, as is the Sons of Confederate Veterans Camp #349 in the Sherman/Denison, Texas area. Several of Colonel Reeves's relatives still live in Grayson County as well as Tyler and Dallas, Texas, Oklahoma City, Louisiana, Colorado and California.

In the Paramount+ 2023 television series Lawmen: Bass Reeves from creator Taylor Sheridan, Reeves is played by Shea Whigham.

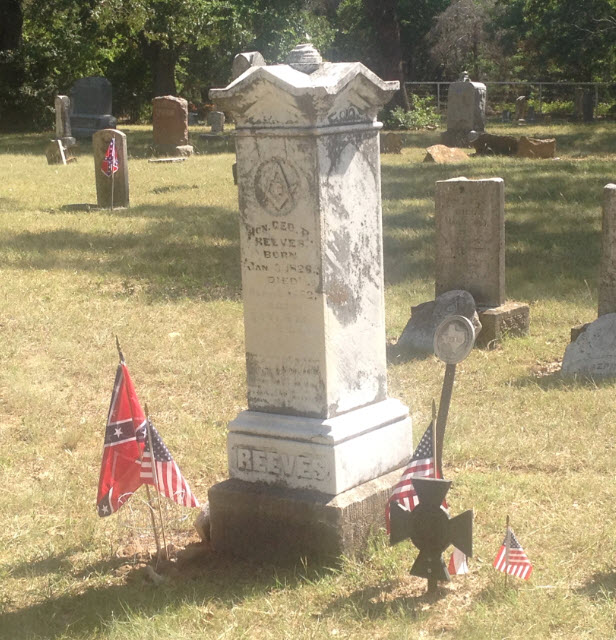
Headstone of George Robertson Reeves, Georgetown Cemetery, Pottsboro, Texas

== Sources ==
- George Robertson REEVES\Jane MOORE (MRIN:2055)
- REEVES, GEORGE ROBERTSON
- The 11th Texas Cavalry, CSA

State of Texas Biographical Sketches, 1879 Biographical Souvenir of the State of Texas, Chicago, FA Battey & Company, 1889 Reliques of the Rives (Ryves), James Rives Childs, Heritage Books, 1929 Texas Politics Project, University of Texas Austin, 2017
