= Edward Brown (American lawyer) =

American lawyer

Edward Brown (born circa 1790) was a South Carolina lawyer who wrote an early and robust proslavery tract, Notes on the Origin and Necessity of Slavery. The book was published four years after the Denmark Vesey conspiracy. Brown's tract was a companion to other South Carolina proslavery works by Whitemarsh Benjamin Seabrook and was shortly before the more famous proslavery pamphlet by Chancellor William Harper (South Carolina politician). His book is remembered for the phrase that "slavery is the stepladder by which civilized countries have passed from barbarism to civilization."
