= Edward Browne (priest) =

Irish Anglican priest (1699–1777)

Edward Browne (1699–1777) was an Anglican priest in Ireland.

Browne was born in County Cork and educated at Trinity College, Dublin. Browne was ordained in 1749 and held incumbencies at Macloneigh and Ardnegihy. He was Vicar choral of Cork from 1749 to 1750; and Archdeacon of Ross from 1749 until his death. He was Precentor of Cork from 1750 to 1752; and Prebendary of Killaspugmullane in Cork Cathedral from 1752 until his death.
