= Jacob E. Freeman =

American politician

Jacob E. Freeman (c. 1841–1900) was a state legislator in Texas. He served in the Texas House of Representatives in the Fourteenth Texas Legislature and Sixteenth Texas Legislature. He later ran for governor.

He is listed on a plaque.

== See also ==
- African American officeholders from the end of the Civil War until before 1900
