= Jewett H. Davenport =

American state legislator

Jewett Harbert Davenport, also known as Jouett Harbert Davenport, (November 1, 1828-?) was a state legislator in Texas. He served in the Texas Senate during the 14th, 16th and 17th legislatures.

Born in Clarke County, Georgia, he moved to Texas in 1854. He lived in Coryell County before the civil war and served in the Confederate Army.

He lived in Bell County, Texas. He chaired the committee on public printing.

He is buried at the Eastland Cemetery in Eastland, Texas.
