= Ed Brown (Texas politician) =

American politician

Edward Brown was an American carpenter and state legislator in Texas. He lived in Rusk County, Texas and served in 1874 as a representative of a two county district of Harrison County and Rusk County. He served along with Webster Flanagan in the State Senate and Shack Roberts from Harrison County.

He and 51 other Texas state officeholders from the 19th century are commemorated on a memorial dedicated in 2010.

== See also ==
- African American officeholders from the end of the Civil War until before 1900
