= Edward Brown (cricketer, born 1837) =

Australian cricketer

Personal information
- Born: January 1837; Uppingham, England
- Died: 1900 (aged 62–63); Blackburn, England
- Source: ESPNcricinfo, 23 December 2016

Edward Brown (January 1837 – 1900) was an Australian cricketer. He played one first-class match for New South Wales in 1859/60.

== See also ==
- List of New South Wales representative cricketers
