= Edward Brown (cricketer, born 1891) =

Australian cricketer

Personal information
- Born: 7 March 1891; Newcastle, New South Wales, Australia
- Died: 12 March 1949 (aged 58); Bowenfels, New South Wales, Australia
- Source: ESPNcricinfo, 23 December 2016

Edward Brown (7 March 1891 – 12 March 1949) was an Australian cricketer. He played one first-class match for New South Wales in 1920/21.

== See also ==
- List of New South Wales representative cricketers
