= Edward J. Brown (academic) =

American literary scholar

- Born: 1909; Chicago
- Died: 1991 (aged 81–82); Stanford

Academic work
- Discipline: literary scholar
- Institutions: Stanford University

Edward James Brown (1909–1991) was an American literary scholar and Professor at Stanford University. He is known as a pioneer in the academic study of Russian literature in the United States.
