= John Hughes Cochran =

American lawmaker from Texas (1838–1928)

Speaker of the Texas House of Representatives

Personal details
- Born: June 28, 1838 Columbia, Tennessee, U.S.
- Died: October 20, 1928 (aged 90) Sweetwater, Texas
- Party: Democratic

John Hughes Cochran (1838–1928) was an American lawmaker who served as the Speaker of the Texas House of Representatives for the 16th Texas Legislature.

== Early life and education ==
Cochran was born June 28, 1838 in Columbia, Tennessee. At the age of three his parents moved with him to Missouri but relocated to Farmers Branch, Texas a few years later. His father is credited with being the first to sow wheat in Dallas County, which was done in 1844. He graduated with honors from the McKenzie Institute and also taught at the institution in 1858 and 1859.

== Career ==
In 1860, Cochran commanded Texas Rangers under Governor Sam Houston. He also served as a Deputy U.S. Marshal and took the United States census for Young County, Texas. During the American Civil War, he was a private soldier for Company C of the 6th Texas Cavalry Regiment. He served starting in 1861 but was forced to resign due to health reasons in 1862. Following his resignation, he served as the assessor and collector for Dallas County until 1866.

Cochran was elected to the 14th, 15th, and 16th Texas State legislatures. He served as the Speaker of the Texas House of Representatives in the 16th legislature from 1879 to 1881. He had also served as Postmaster for Dallas County, being appointed by Grover Cleveland. In 1884 he was a candidate for Governor of Texas.

He returned the legislature in 1893, being elected to both the 22nd and 23rd State legislatures. He was again elected Speaker of the House for the 23rd legislature. In 1928, he completed a written history of Dallas County for the Dallas Historical Society.

== Personal life ==
Cochran was a Knight of Honor for the Freemasons and had six children. His father was the first Clerk of Dallas County when it was organized in 1846 and also served in the Texas State Legislature. Cochran died on October 20, 1928 in Sweetwater, Texas.
