= Kip Averitt =

American politician

Member of the Texas Senate from the 22nd district
- In office 2002–2010
- Preceded by: David Sibley
- Succeeded by: Brian Birdwell

Personal details
- Born: October 31, 1954 (age 71) Crane, Texas, U.S.
- Party: Republican
- Education: Baylor University

Barry Kip Averitt (born October 31, 1954) is an American politician who served as a member of the Texas Senate from the 22nd District from 2002 to 2010.

== Early life and education ==
Averitt was born in West Texas in Crane in Crane County, near Odessa, Texas. Averitt is a graduate of Baylor University in Waco, where he now resides.

== Career ==
While in the senate, Averitt chaired the Senate Committee on Natural Resources where he authored Senate Bill 3 in 2007, which, following Senate Bill 1 in 1997 and Senate Bill 2 in 2001, is one of the most important bills in modern Texas history related to water. Senate Bill 3 provided a science and stakeholder-driven environmental flow planning process for the state, created the Water Conservation Advisory Council, and set the Edwards Aquifer Authority on the path of creating a habitat conservation plan to protect endangered species in San Marcos and Comal springs.

Averitt inserted language into HB 2649 outlawing the profession of theatrical or architectural lighting designer unless licensed as an engineer, electrician, architect, or interior designer.

Averitt stepped down from his seat on March 8, 2010, citing health problems.

== Election history ==
Senate election history of Averitt.

=== Most recent election ===
==== 2006 ====
Texas general election, 2006: Senate District 22
Party	Candidate	Votes	%	±%
Republican	Kip Averitt (Incumbent)	112,765	80.60	+13.22
Libertarian	Phil Smart	27,141	19.40	+19.40
Majority		85,624	61.20	+26.45
Turnout		139,906		−11.38
Republican hold				

=== Previous elections ===
==== 2002 ====
Texas general election, 2002: Senate District 22
Party	Candidate	Votes	%	±%
Republican	Kip Averitt	106,371	67.38	−32.62
Democratic	Richard "Richie" J. Renschler Jr.	51,506	32.62	+32.62
Majority		54,865	34.75	−65.25
Turnout		157,877		+88.10
Republican hold				

Republican primary, 2002: Senate District 22
Candidate		Votes	%	±
✓	Kip Averitt	20,074	57.63	
	Ed Harrison	14,758	42.37	
Majority		5,316	15.26	
Turnout		34,832		

Texas House of Representatives
Preceded by Betty Denton	Member of the Texas House of Representatives from District 56 (McGregor); 1993–2002	Succeeded by Holt Getterman
Texas Senate
Preceded by David Sibley	Texas State Senator for District 22 (McGregor); 2002-2010	Succeeded by Brian Birdwell
