= Tia Blassingame =

American book artist, publisher, and professor

- Born: 1971 (age 54–55); New Haven, CT
- Education: Princeton; Corcoran School of the Arts and Design; Rhode Island School of Design
- Known for: Artists' books, printmaking
- Notable work: Mourning / Warning (2015); I AM (2018)
- Parents: John W. Blassingame (father); Teasie (Jackson) Blassingame (mother)
- Website: primrosepress.com

Tia Blassingame (born 1971, New Haven, CT) is an American book artist and publisher. She is associate professor of art at Scripps College.

== Career ==
Blassingame holds a B.A. in Architecture from Princeton University, a M.A. in Book Arts and printmaking from the Corcoran College of Art & Design, and an M.F.A. in Printmaking from the Rhode Island School of Design. She was Artist-in-Residence at the International Print Center (2019), Yaddo (2011), MacDowell (2010) and the Santa Fe Art Institute (2010).

Blassingame is an Associate Professor of Art and Director of Scripps College Press at Scripps College, Claremont, California. Her work has been collected by private and public collections, including the Library of Congress, the Massachusetts Institute of Technology, Harvard University, the library of The Tate in Britain, the National Museum of Women in the Arts, the National Gallery of Art and its library, and Yale University. Her work has appeared in The Brooklyn Rail.

Since 2009, Blassingame has been the owner and proprietor at Primrose Press. In 2019, Blassingame was a contributing writer in Freedom of the Presses: Artist Books in the Twenty-first Century. She also founded the Book/Print Artist/Scholar of Color collective in the same year. She serves on the Board of Directors for the College Book Art Association and is a member of the Board of Trustees for the American Printing History Association.

In 2023, Blassingame was an artist-in-residence at Halden Bookworks in Oslo, Norway.

== Art and exhibitions ==
=== Artistic style ===
Blassingame's work in mixed-media, bookmaking, printmaking, and flag-making employs elements of Concrete poetry and uses books and physical artifacts to provide the viewer with a tactile interaction with the conversation around racism in the United States. Blassingame has also been active in scholarly understanding and symposia exploring the history and production of Black books and bibliographia.

In an interview in 2020, Blassingame reflected on her upbringing and how coming from "a fairly bookish family" surrounded her with book arts in many forms, especially books of, by, or about Black creators. In this same interview, the artist speaks about trying to use the distinct possibilities of book arts and printmaking to reach readers for a discussion of historical and contemporary race and racism.

=== Selected exhibitions ===
Blassingame has exhibited throughout the U.S., including:

- 2014 "The Exact Measure of Cruelty: Slavery and Racism in Artists’ Books", Milner Library, Illinois State University
- 2018 Mourning/Warning, Atkinson Gallery, Santa Barbara City College. In this exhibition, Blassingame provides a look into her experience as an African-American woman.
- 2018 Text & Textile, Art and Architecture Library at Yale University
- 2019 Playing with Words at the Minnesota Center for Book Arts (MCBA)
- 2019 I Am Mourning/Warning, Morey Family Gallery at Art Reach of Mid-Michigan
- 2019 Umbra: New Prints for a Dark Age at International Print Center
- 2020 I AM/YOU ARE, Berea College. In her art book, Blassingame comments on her experience as an African-American woman through the medium of printmaking. She also offers insight into experiences of police brutality, violence and humiliation through the lens of being African-American.
- 2020 Intersections: Book Arts as Conversion at Tulane University
- 2022 Troubling: Artists’ Books that Enlighten and Disrupt Old Ways of Being and Seeing at Bainbridge Island Museum of Art
- 2023 Paper Is People: Decolonizing Global Paper Cultures at Minnesota Center for Book Arts and San Francisco Center for the Book
