= Edward Brown (footballer) =

English footballer

Personal information
- Full name: Edward Hutchinson Brown
- Date of birth: 24 April 1881
- Place of birth: Sunderland, England
- Position: Forward

Senior career*
Years	Team	Apps	(Gls)
1903–1905	Lincoln City	37	(9)
- * Club domestic league appearances and goals

Edward Hutchinson Brown (24 April 1881 – after 1904) was an English footballer who made 37 appearances in the Football League playing for Lincoln City as a forward.
