= Eddie Brown (Australian footballer) =

Australian rules footballer

Personal information
- Full name: Edward Brown
- Born: 10 October 1877
- Died: 29 November 1934 (aged 57); Healesville, Victoria
- Original team: Caulfield

Playing career^{1}
Years	Club	Games (Goals)
1898	South Melbourne	5 (1)
- ^{1} Playing statistics correct to the end of 1898.

Edward Brown (10 October 1877 – 29 November 1934) was an Australian rules footballer who played with South Melbourne in the Victorian Football League (VFL).

== Family ==
The son of William Brown, and Deborah Brown, née Riley, Edward Brown was born at Healesville, Victoria on 10 October 1877.

He married Rose Burrage (1878–1933) in 1912. They had two daughters, Mavis (b.1915) and Jessie (b.1920).

== Football ==
He played in five matches for South Melbourne in the first five home-and-away games of the 1898 season.

== Death ==
He died at his residence in Healesville, Victoria on 29 November 1934.
