= Shack Roberts =

American enslaved man and later politician

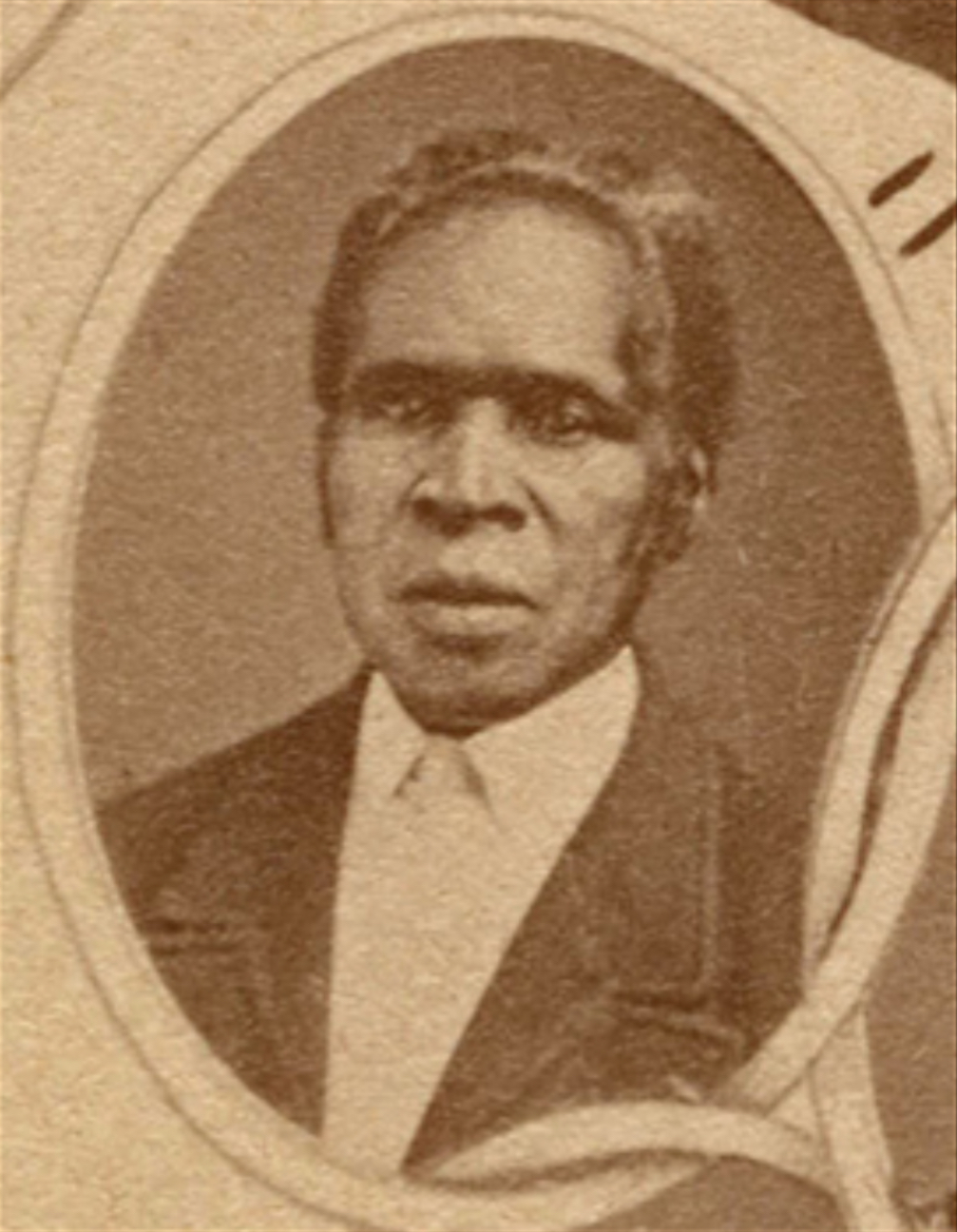
- Roberts in 1873

Member of the Texas House of Representatives from the 5th district
- In office 1873–c. 1878
- Preceding: Thomas Gillespie Allison and William Wright Morris
- Preceded by: Washington Holley

Personal details
- Born: Meshack R. Roberts; Arkansas, US
- Party: Republican

Meshack R. Roberts was an American enslaved man and later politician.

== Early life ==
Born in Arkansas, Roberts and the man who owned him, O. B. Roberts, moved him to Gilmer, Texas in 1844. During the American Civil War, O. B. served in the Confederate States Army while Roberts cared for his house and family. After the war, O. B. gave him land and material to build a log cabin. In 1867, he was whipped by members of the Ku Klux Klan, and soon moved to Marshall, where he worked as a blacksmith.

== Career ==
In 1873, Roberts was elected to the 13th Legislature of the Texas House of Representatives. A Republican from the 5th district, he helped improve education of African American children. He was also noted for his sarcasm and sense of humor. He was reelected for the 14th and 15th Legislatures. He was removed from office by the White Citizens Parties. He also helped establish Wiley University.

== Legacy ==
Roberts was honored by the 79th Texas Legislature, along with other early African-American legislators, for their service to Texas.

== See also ==
- African American officeholders from the end of the Civil War until before 1900
