= Wheeler's October 1863 Raid =

American Civil War cavalry raid

- Part of the American Civil War
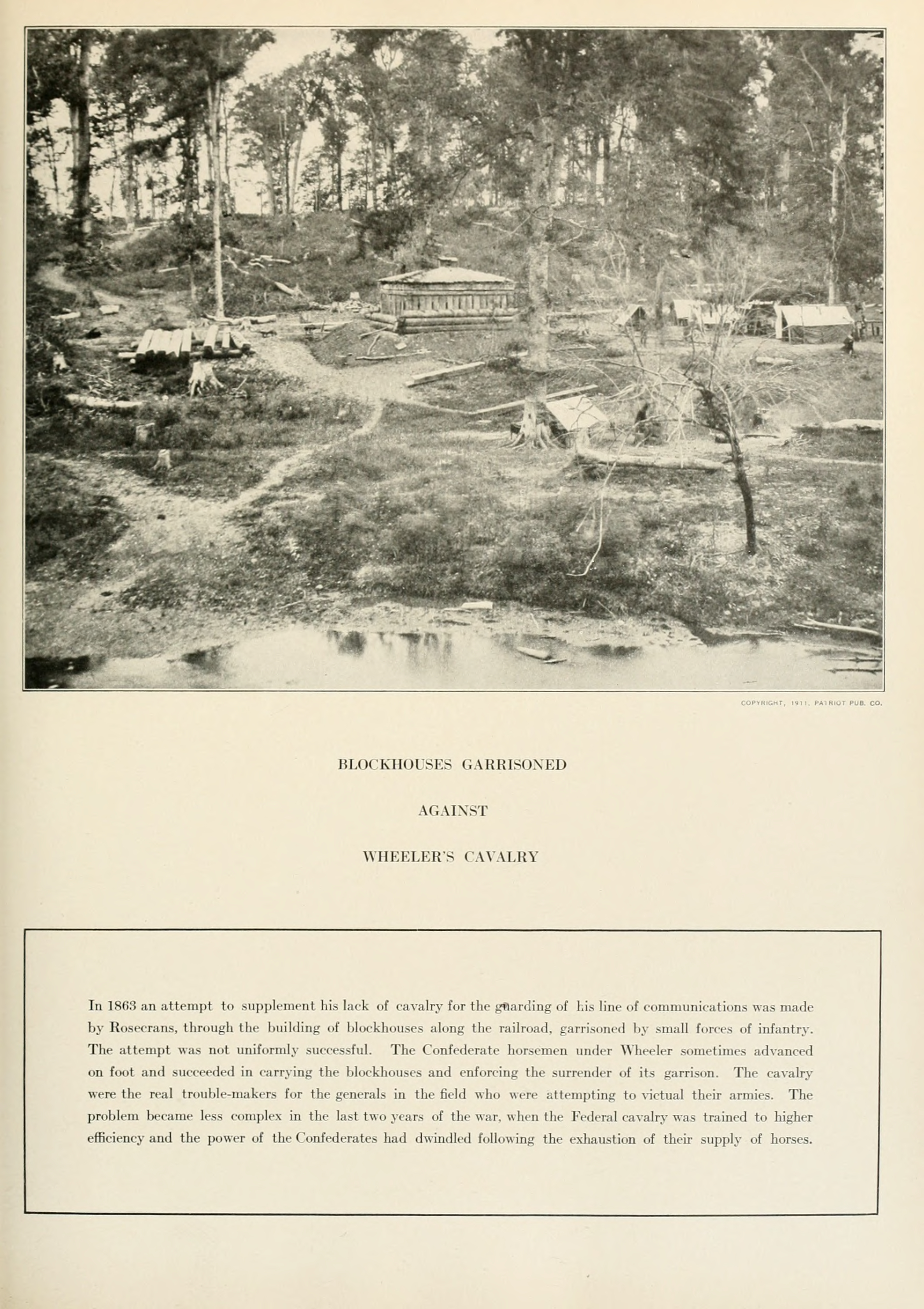
- Blockhouses garrisoned against Wheeler's cavalry
Date	October 1–9, 1863
Location	Southeastern Tennessee
Result	Inconclusive

Belligerents
United States (Union)	(Confederate States of America) CSA (Confederacy)

Commanders and leaders
Robert Byington Mitchell; George Crook	Joseph Wheeler

Strength
Elements of 2 cavalry divisions	2½ cavalry divisions

Casualties and losses
533+ men, 1,000 mules, 500 wagons	698+ men, 6 cannons

Wheeler's October 1863 Raid (October 1–9, 1863) was a large cavalry raid in southeastern Tennessee during the American Civil War. Maj. Gen. Joseph Wheeler's Confederate cavalry scored a great initial success, but subsequently was roughed up by Union cavalry during its withdrawal south of the Tennessee River.

== Background ==
After being defeated in the Battle of Chickamauga, the Union Army of the Cumberland, commanded by Maj. Gen. William S. Rosecrans, withdrew into the city of Chattanooga, Tennessee, and was besieged by Gen. Braxton Bragg's Army of Tennessee. The Federals held a rail head at Bridgeport, Alabama, but because Bragg's army occupied Lookout Mountain, they had to bring supplies into the beleaguered city by wagon. The routes along the Tennessee River were easily harassed by the Confederates, so Rosecrans had to bring most of his supplies into Chattanooga from Bridgeport along a 60-mile wagon route across Walden's Ridge. Bragg ordered Wheeler to take the bulk of his cavalry corps and disrupt Rosecrans's communications across Walden's Ridge.

== Anderson's Cross Roads ==
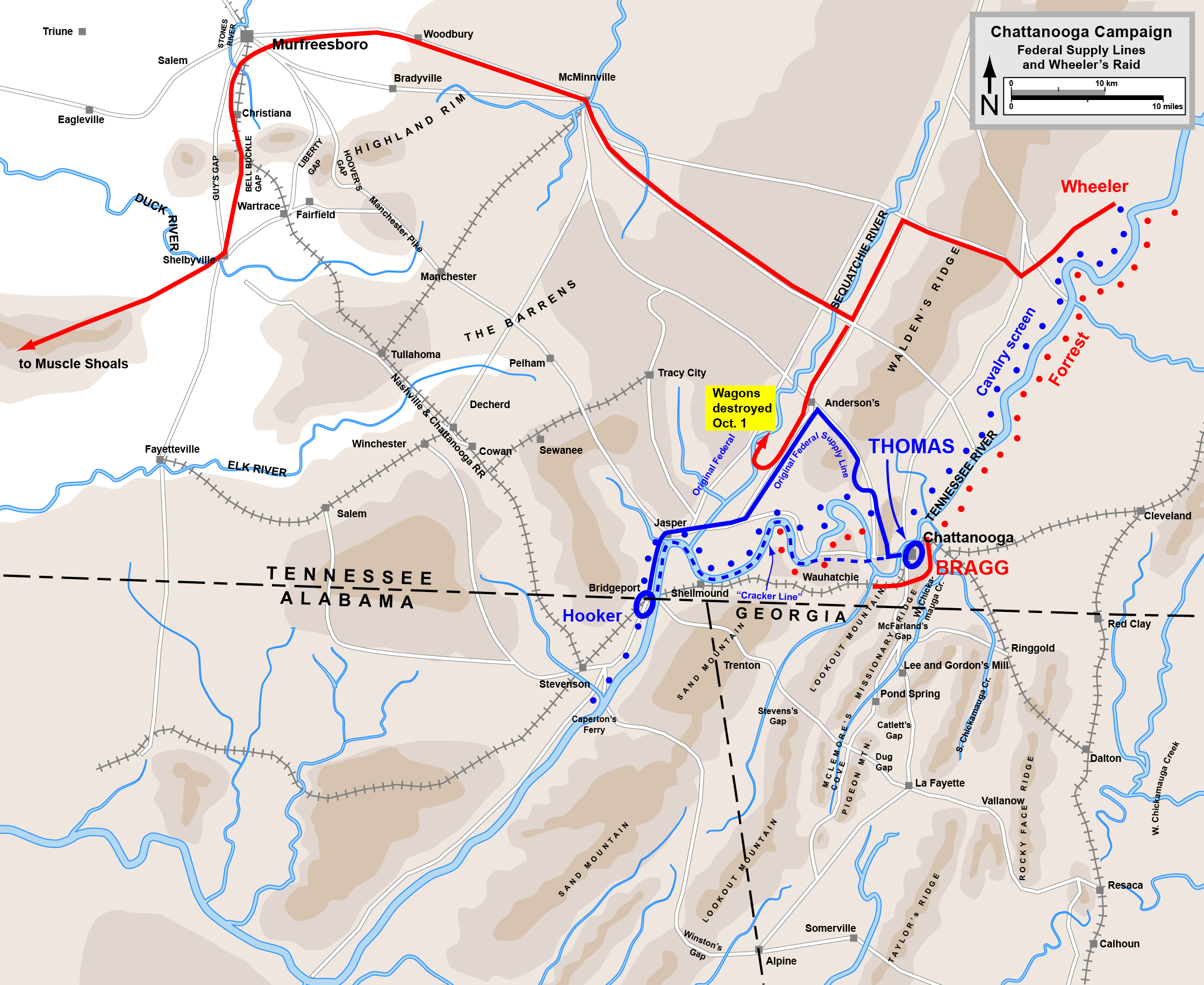
Map of Wheeler's raid

Wheeler set out on October 1 with the divisions of Brig. Gen. Frank Crawford Armstrong and Maj. Gen. William T. Martin, plus part of Maj. Gen. John A. Wharton's division. He quickly broke through the screen of Brig. Gen. George Crook's 2nd Cavalry Division near Decatur, Tennessee, and rode toward Walden's Ridge. On October 2 at Anderson's Cross Roads, Wheeler surprised a train of 800 mule-drawn wagons, plus sutler's wagons. The Southern horsemen easily overwhelmed the few guards and began to carry out their orders to "kill the mules and burn the wagons." Soon, whiskey was discovered in the sutler's wagons and Wheeler's men began pillaging the wagons for new clothing and other booty. The officers were either unwilling or unable to stop what became an eight-hour orgy of plundering.

Soon, Col. Edward M. McCook arrived with his brigade of Union cavalry. In a series of skirmishes, McCook lost 70 men while recapturing 800 mules and a few wagons and inflicting 270 losses on the tipsy Southerners. Wharton rode to McMinnville, Tennessee, which was captured with a loss of 388 Federals and 23 Confederates. Meanwhile, Crook could deflect Wheeler's main body away from the supply base at Murfreesboro, Tennessee.

== Farmington ==
By October 7, Brig. Gen. Robert Byington Mitchell concentrated McCook and Crook at Shelbyville, Tennessee. That day, Crook mauled Henry B. Davidson's brigade of Wharton's division near Farmington, losing 75 Federals while inflicting a loss of 310. The pursuit continued in foul weather as some elements of Union cavalry rode as many as 57 miles. Wheeler escaped across the Tennessee River on October 9 at Rogersville, Alabama, but not before another 95 of his horsemen were overwhelmed near Pulaski, Tennessee.

== Aftermath ==
Wheeler inflicted significant damage to the Army of the Cumberland's supply line. He destroyed 500 wagons by Rosecrans's estimate and claimed killing 1,000 mules. However, during the pursuit, his command was badly roughed up by the Union horsemen, "his once proud command all but wrecked." In the face of the aggressive Northern cavalry, Brig. Gen. Phillip Roddey cut short his follow-up raid. Another planned cavalry raid by Maj. Gen. Stephen D. Lee was canceled after he found out that Wheeler's command was no longer in the field.
