= Robert J. Evans =

19th-century American state legislator

Robert J. Evans (born 1853 in Louisiana, died 27 September 1921 in Harris County, Texas) was a Republican state legislator in Texas. Born into slavery, he served two terms representing Grimes County from January 1879 to January 1883. In addition to his career as a legislator, he worked as a teacher and was a delegate to the 1882 and 1884 State Republican Conventions, the 1883 State Colored Men's Convention and the 1884 National Republican Convention.

== See also ==
- African American officeholders from the end of the Civil War until before 1900
