= Texas's 22nd Senate district =

American legislative district

Texas's 22nd State Senate district
- Senator: Vacant
- Demographics: 59.2% White; 13.7% Black; 23.8% Hispanic; 2.9% Asian
- Population: 879,234

District 22 of the Texas Senate is a senatorial district that currently serves all of Bosque, Comanche, Eastland, Erath, Ellis, Hamilton, Hill, Hood, McLennan, and Somervell counties and portions of Ellis and Tarrant counties in the U.S. state of Texas.

The seat is currently vacant.

== Biggest cities in the district ==
District 22 has a population of 809,840 with 592,255 that is at voting age from the 2010 census.

	Name	County	Pop. (Note: Population is based on the number of people in the district in that city, not the overall population of that city)
1	Waco	McLennan	124,805
2	Arlington	Tarrant	68,248
3	Waxahachie	Ellis	29,621
4	Cleburne	Johnson	29,337
5	Burleson	Johnson	29,111

== Election history ==
Election history of District 22 from 1992. (Note: Uncontested primary elections are not shown.)

=== 2022 ===
Texas general election, 2022: Senate District 22
Party	Candidate	Votes	%	±%
Republican	Brian Birdwell (Incumbent)	190,988	74.26	+5.74
Libertarian	Jeremy Schroppel	66,204	25.74	+25.74
Turnout		257,192	100.00	
Republican hold				

=== 2020 ===
Texas general election, 2020: Senate District 22
Party	Candidate	Votes	%	±%
Republican	Brian Birdwell (Incumbent)	257,208	68.52	−1.98
Democratic	Robert Vick	118,538	31.55	+1.98
Turnout		375,746	100.00	
Republican hold				

=== 2016 ===
Texas general election, 2016: Senate District 22
Party	Candidate	Votes	%	±%
Republican	Brian Birdwell (Incumbent)	211,380	70.43	−15.14
Democratic	Michael Collins	88,769	29.57	+29.57
Turnout		300,149		
Republican hold				

=== 2012 ===
Texas general election, 2012: Senate District 22
Party	Candidate	Votes	%	±%
Republican	Brian Birdwell (Incumbent)	188,544	85.57	−14.43
Libertarian	Tom Kilbride	31,786	14.43	+14.43
Turnout		220,330		
Republican hold				

=== 2010 ===
Texas general election, 2010: Senate District 22
Party	Candidate	Votes	%	±%
Republican	Brian Birdwell (Incumbent)	134,231	100.00	
Turnout		134,231		
Republican hold				

=== 2010 (special) ===
Texas Special Runoff Election State Senate: Senate District 22
Party	Candidate	Votes	%	±%
Republican	Brian Birdwell	14,218	57.90	+21.39
Republican	David Sibley	10,339	42.10	−2.87
Turnout		24,557		
Republican hold				

Texas May Special Election, 2010: Senate District 22
Party	Candidate	Votes	%
Republican	David Sibley	13,423	44.97
Republican	Brian Birdwell	10,900	36.51
Democratic	Gayle R. Avant	3,968	13.29
Republican	Darren Yancy	1,560	5.23
Turnout		29,851	
Republican hold			

=== 2006 ===
Texas general election, 2006: Senate District 22
Party	Candidate	Votes	%	±%
Republican	Kip Averitt (Incumbent)	112,765	80.60	+13.22
Libertarian	Phil Smart	27,141	19.40	+19.40
Majority		85,624	61.20	+26.45
Turnout		139,906		−11.38
Republican hold				

=== 2002 ===
Texas general election, 2002: Senate District 22
Party	Candidate	Votes	%	±%
Republican	Kip Averitt	106,371	67.38	−32.62
Democratic	Richard "Richie" J. Renschler, Jr.	51,506	32.62	+32.62
Majority		54,865	34.75	−65.25
Turnout		157,877		+88.10
Republican hold				

Republican primary, 2002: Senate District 22
Candidate		Votes	%	±
✓	Kip Averitt	20,074	57.63	
	Ed Harrison	14,758	42.37	
Majority		5,316	15.26	
Turnout		34,832		

=== 1998 ===
Texas general election, 1998: Senate District 22
Party	Candidate	Votes	%	±%
Republican	David Sibley (Incumbent)	83,933	100.00	+41.34
Majority		83,933	100.00	+82.68
Turnout		83,933		−40.73
Republican hold				

=== 1994 ===
Texas general election, 1994: Senate District 22
Party	Candidate	Votes	%	±%
Republican	David Sibley (Incumbent)	83,064	58.66	−1.64
Democratic	Margaret Ross Messina	58,544	41.34	+1.64
Majority		24,520	17.32	−3.28
Turnout		141,608		−38.97
Republican hold				

=== 1992 ===
Texas general election, 1992: Senate District 22
Party	Candidate	Votes	%	±%
Republican	Jane Nelson	139,901	60.30	
Democratic	Bob Glasgow (Incumbent)	92,113	39.70	
Majority		47,778	20.60	
Turnout		232,014		
Republican gain from Democratic				

== District officeholders ==
Legislature	Senator, District 22	Counties in District
3	Benjamin Rush Wallace	Anderson, Angelina, Bowie, Cass, Cherokee, Collin, Cooke, Dallas, Denton, Fannin, Grayson, Harrison, Hopkins, Houston, Hunt, Jasper, Jefferson, Kaufman, Lamar, Liberty, Nacogdoches, Newton, Panola, Polk, Red River, Rusk, Sabine, San Augustine, Shelby, Titus, Tyler, Upshur, Van Zandt.
4	Baron Otfried Hans Freiherr von Meusebach	Bexar, Comal, Medina.
5	William Harrison "Howdy" Martin	Freestone, Henderson, Limestone, Navarro.
6	William Harrison "Howdy" Martin	Freestone, Henderson, Limestone, Navarro.
7	William Harrison "Howdy" Martin	Freestone, Henderson, Limestone, Navarro.
8	Francis Marion Martin	Freestone, Henderson, Limestone, Navarro.
9	John T. Harcourt	Colorado, Fayette, Matagorda, Wharton.
10	John T. Harcourt	Colorado, Fayette, Matagorda, Wharton.
11	Richard V. Cook	Colorado, Fayette, Matagorda, Wharton.
12	E. Thomas Broughton	Baylor, Clay, Cooke, Denton, Grayson, Hardeman, Haskell, Jack, Knox, Montague, Throckmorton, Wichita, Wilbarger, Wise, Young.
13	E. Thomas Broughton	Baylor, Clay, Cooke, Denton, Grayson, Hardeman, Haskell, Jack, Knox, Montague, Throckmorton, Wichita, Wilbarger, Wise, Young.
14	William H. Trolinger; N. S. Craven	Archer, Baylor, Clay, Cooke, Grayson, Hardeman, Knox, Montague, Wichita, Wilbarger.
15	John W. Moore	Hill, Johnson, McLennan.
16	John W. Moore	Hill, Johnson, McLennan.
17	Lawrence Sullivan Ross	Hill, Johnson, McLennan.
18	John A. Martin	Falls, McLennan.
19	Richard H. Harrison	Falls, McLennan.
20	Richard H. Harrison; Waller Saunders Baker	Falls, McLennan.
21	Richard H. Harrison	Falls, McLennan.
22	John H. Harrison	Falls, McLennan.
23	Leonidas Storey Lawhon	Atascosa, Bee, Calhoun, DeWitt, Frio, Goliad, Jackson, Karnes, La Salle, Live Oak, McMullen, Refugio, Victoria, Wilson.
24	Leonidas Storey Lawhon	Atascosa, Bee, Calhoun, DeWitt, Frio, Goliad, Jackson, Karnes, La Salle, Live Oak, McMullen, Refugio, Victoria, Wilson.
25	Edward D. Linn	Atascosa, Bee, Calhoun, DeWitt, Frio, Goliad, Jackson, Karnes, La Salle, Live Oak, McMullen, Refugio, Victoria, Wilson.
26	Asbury Bascom Davidson	Atascosa, Bee, Calhoun, DeWitt, Frio, Goliad, Jackson, Karnes, La Salle, Live Oak, McMullen, Refugio, Victoria, Wilson.
27	Asbury Bascom Davidson	Atascosa, Bee, Calhoun, DeWitt, Frio, Goliad, Jackson, Karnes, La Salle, Live Oak, McMullen, Refugio, Victoria, Wilson.
28	Asbury Bascom Davidson	Aransas, Atascosa, Bee, Calhoun, DeWitt, Frio, Goliad, Jackson, Karnes, Live Oak, Refugio, Victoria, Wilson.
29	Asbury Bascom Davidson	Aransas, Atascosa, Bee, Calhoun, DeWitt, Frio, Goliad, Jackson, Karnes, Live Oak, Refugio, Victoria, Wilson.
30	William O. Murray	Aransas, Atascosa, Bee, Calhoun, DeWitt, Frio, Goliad, Jackson, Karnes, Live Oak, Refugio, Victoria, Wilson.
31	William O. Murray	Aransas, Atascosa, Bee, Calhoun, DeWitt, Frio, Goliad, Jackson, Karnes, Live Oak, Refugio, Victoria, Wilson.
32	William O. Murray	Aransas, Atascosa, Bee, Calhoun, DeWitt, Frio, Goliad, Jackson, Karnes, Live Oak, Refugio, Victoria, Wilson.
33	William O. Murray; John Heywood Bailey	Aransas, Atascosa, Bee, Calhoun, DeWitt, Frio, Goliad, Jackson, Karnes, Live Oak, Refugio, Victoria, Wilson.
34	John Heywood Bailey	Aransas, Atascosa, Bee, Calhoun, DeWitt, Frio, Goliad, Jackson, Karnes, Live Oak, Refugio, Victoria, Wilson.
35	John Heywood Bailey	Aransas, Atascosa, Bee, Calhoun, DeWitt, Frio, Goliad, Jackson, Karnes, Live Oak, Refugio, Victoria, Wilson.
36	John Heywood Bailey	Aransas, Atascosa, Bee, Calhoun, DeWitt, Frio, Goliad, Jackson, Karnes, Live Oak, Refugio, Victoria, Wilson.
37	John Heywood Bailey	Aransas, Atascosa, Bee, Calhoun, DeWitt, Frio, Goliad, Jackson, Karnes, Live Oak, Refugio, Victoria, Wilson.
38	John Heywood Bailey	Aransas, Atascosa, Bee, Calhoun, DeWitt, Frio, Goliad, Jackson, Karnes, Live Oak, Refugio, Victoria, Wilson.
39	Eugene Miller	Denton, Jack, Montague, Palo Pinto, Parker, Wise.
40	Eugene Miller	Denton, Jack, Montague, Palo Pinto, Parker, Wise.
41	Eugene Miller	Denton, Jack, Montague, Palo Pinto, Parker, Wise.
42	H. Grady Woodruff	Denton, Jack, Montague, Palo Pinto, Parker, Wise.
43	H. Grady Woodruff	Denton, Jack, Montague, Palo Pinto, Parker, Wise.
44	H. Grady Woodruff	Denton, Jack, Montague, Palo Pinto, Parker, Wise.
45	H. Grady Woodruff	Denton, Jack, Montague, Palo Pinto, Parker, Wise.
46	Royston Lanning	Denton, Jack, Montague, Palo Pinto, Parker, Wise.
47	Royston Lanning	Denton, Jack, Montague, Palo Pinto, Parker, Wise.
48	Royston Lanning	Denton, Jack, Montague, Palo Pinto, Parker, Wise.
49	Royston Lanning	Denton, Jack, Montague, Palo Pinto, Parker, Wise.
50	Robert L. Proffer	Denton, Jack, Montague, Palo Pinto, Parker, Wise.
51	Robert L. Proffer	Denton, Jack, Montague, Palo Pinto, Parker, Wise.
52	Wayne W. Wagonseller	Denton, Jack, Montague, Palo Pinto, Parker, Wise.
53	Wayne W. Wagonseller	Callahan, Clay, Denton, Eastland, Jack, Montague, Palo Pinto, Parker, Stephens, Wise.
54	Wayne W. Wagonseller	Callahan, Clay, Denton, Eastland, Jack, Montague, Palo Pinto, Parker, Stephens, Wise.
55	Floyd Francis Bradshaw	Callahan, Clay, Denton, Eastland, Jack, Montague, Palo Pinto, Parker, Stephens, Wise.
56	Floyd Francis Bradshaw; Robert W. Baker	Callahan, Clay, Denton, Eastland, Jack, Montague, Palo Pinto, Parker, Stephens, Wise.
57	Robert W. Baker; Tom Creighton	Callahan, Clay, Denton, Eastland, Jack, Montague, Palo Pinto, Parker, Stephens, Wise.
58	Tom Creighton	Callahan, Clay, Denton, Eastland, Jack, Montague, Palo Pinto, Parker, Stephens, Wise.
59	Tom Creighton	Callahan, Clay, Denton, Eastland, Jack, Montague, Palo Pinto, Parker, Stephens, Wise.
60	Tom Creighton	All of Clay, Eastland, Jack, Montague, Palo Pinto, Parker, Stephens, Wise. Portion of Tarrant.
61	Tom Creighton	All of Clay, Eastland, Jack, Montague, Palo Pinto, Parker, Stephens, Wise. Portion of Tarrant.
62	Tom Creighton	All of Clay, Eastland, Jack, Montague, Palo Pinto, Parker, Stephens, Wise. Portion of Tarrant.
63	Tom Creighton	All of Bosque, Comanche, Cooke, Denton, Eastland, Erath, Hill, Hood, Jack, Johnson, Montague, Palo Pinto, Parker, Somervell, Stephens, Wise, Young. Portion of Tarrant.
64	Tom Creighton	All of Bosque, Comanche, Cooke, Denton, Eastland, Erath, Hill, Hood, Jack, Johnson, Montague, Palo Pinto, Parker, Somervell, Stephens, Wise, Young. Portion of Tarrant.
65	Tom Creighton	Bosque, Comanche, Cooke, Denton, Eastland, Erath, Hill, Hood, Jack, Johnson, Montague, Palo Pinto, Parker, Somervell, Stephens, Wise, Young.
66	Tom Creighton	Bosque, Comanche, Cooke, Denton, Eastland, Erath, Hill, Hood, Jack, Johnson, Montague, Palo Pinto, Parker, Somervell, Stephens, Wise, Young.
67	Bob Glasgow	Bosque, Comanche, Cooke, Denton, Eastland, Erath, Hill, Hood, Jack, Johnson, Montague, Palo Pinto, Parker, Somervell, Stephens, Wise, Young.
68	Bob Glasgow	All of Bosque, Comanche, Eastland, Erath, Hamilton, Hood, Johnson, Palo Pinto, Parker, Somervell, Stephens, Wise. Portions of Denton, Tarrant.
69	Bob Glasgow	All of Bosque, Comanche, Eastland, Erath, Hamilton, Hood, Johnson, Palo Pinto, Parker, Somervell, Stephens, Wise. Portions of Denton, Tarrant.
70	Bob Glasgow	All of Bosque, Comanche, Eastland, Erath, Hamilton, Hood, Johnson, Palo Pinto, Parker, Somervell, Stephens, Wise. Portions of Denton, Tarrant.
71	Bob Glasgow	All of Bosque, Comanche, Eastland, Erath, Hamilton, Hood, Johnson, Palo Pinto, Parker, Somervell, Stephens, Wise. Portions of Denton, Tarrant.
72	Bob Glasgow	All of Bosque, Comanche, Eastland, Erath, Hamilton, Hood, Johnson, Palo Pinto, Parker, Somervell, Stephens, Wise. Portions of Denton, Tarrant.
73	Jane Nelson	All of Bosque, Comanche, Eastland, Erath, Hamilton, Hood, Palo Pinto, Somervell, Wise. Portions of Denton, Johnson, Parker, Tarrant.
74	David Sibley	All of Bosque, Comanche, Eastland, Erath, Hamilton, Hill, Hood, Jack, Palo Pinto, Somervell, Wise. Portions of Denton, Johnson, McLennan, Parker, Tarrant.
75	David Sibley	All of Bosque, Comanche, Eastland, Erath, Hamilton, Hill, Hood, Jack, Palo Pinto, Somervell, Wise. Portions of Denton, Johnson, McLennan, Parker, Tarrant.
76	David Sibley	All of Bosque, Comanche, Eastland, Erath, Hamilton, Hill, Hood, Jack, Palo Pinto, Somervell, Wise. Portions of Denton, Johnson, McLennan, Parker, Tarrant.
77	David Sibley	All of Bosque, Comanche, Eastland, Erath, Hamilton, Hill, Hood, Jack, Palo Pinto, Somervell, Wise. Portions of Denton, Johnson, McLennan, Parker, Tarrant.
78	Kip Averitt	Bosque, Coryell, Ellis, Falls, Hill, Hood, Johnson, McLennan, Navarro, Somervell.
79	Kip Averitt	Bosque, Coryell, Ellis, Falls, Hill, Hood, Johnson, McLennan, Navarro, Somervell.
80	Kip Averitt	Bosque, Coryell, Ellis, Falls, Hill, Hood, Johnson, McLennan, Navarro, Somervell.
81	Kip Averitt; Brian Birdwell	Bosque, Coryell, Ellis, Falls, Hill, Hood, Johnson, McLennan, Navarro, Somervell.
82	Brian Birdwell	Bosque, Coryell, Ellis, Falls, Hill, Hood, Johnson, McLennan, Navarro, Somervell.
83	Brian Birdwell	Bosque, Ellis, Falls, Hill, Hood, Johnson, McLennan, Navarro, Somervell. Portion of Tarrant.
84	Brian Birdwell	Bosque, Ellis, Falls, Hill, Hood, Johnson, McLennan, Navarro, Somervell. Portion of Tarrant.
85	Brian Birdwell	Bosque, Ellis, Falls, Hill, Hood, Johnson, McLennan, Navarro, Somervell. Portion of Tarrant.
86	Brian Birdwell	Bosque, Ellis, Falls, Hill, Hood, Johnson, McLennan, Navarro, Somervell. Portion of Tarrant.
87	Brian Birdwell	Bosque, Ellis, Falls, Hill, Hood, Johnson, McLennan, Navarro, Somervell. Portion of Tarrant.
88	Brian Birdwell	Bosque, Comanche, Eastland, Erath, Ellis, Hamilton, Hill, Hood, McLennan, Somervell. Portions of Ellis, Tarrant.
89	Brian Birdwell	Bosque, Comanche, Eastland, Erath, Ellis, Hamilton, Hill, Hood, McLennan, Somervell. Portions of Ellis, Tarrant.
