= David Sibley (politician) =

American politician

Member of the Texas Senate from the 22nd district
- In office 1991–2002
- Preceded by: Chet Edwards
- Succeeded by: Kip Averitt

Mayor of Waco
- In office 1987–1988
- Preceded by: LaNelle McNamara
- Succeeded by: R.D. Pattillo

Member of the Waco City Council
- In office 1984–1987
- Preceded by: Gary Cook
- Succeeded by: Jay Larsen

Personal details
- Born: 1949 (age 76–77) San Antonio, Texas
- Party: Republican
- Spouse: Pamela Patterson Sibley (married 1970)
- Children: Rachel Sibley Reid David McAdams Sibley Jr. Jonathan Sibley
- Parent(s): J. Dale Sibley; Marilyn McAdams Sibley
- Education: Baylor University Baylor College of Dentistry Baylor University Law School
- Profession: Dentist; Attorney; Lobbyist

David McAdams Sibley Sr. (born 1947) is an American lawyer and former Texas politician. He served from March 1991 to January 2002 as a Republican member of the Texas State Senate.

Sibley was mayor of Waco. He is also a lobbyist in Austin and Waco, Texas.

Sibley became a lawyer after he lost his oral surgery practice due to nerve damage in his hand.

Preceded by LaNelle McNamara	Mayor of Waco, Texas; 1987–1988	Succeeded by R. D. Pattillo
Preceded by Gary Cook	Member of the Waco City Council (District 3); 1984–1987	Succeeded by Jay Larsen
Texas Senate
Preceded by Chet Edwards (in District 9)	Texas State Senator from District 22 (Waco); 1991–2002	Succeeded by Kip Averitt
