= William Blassingame =

American politician

- Born: January 13, 1836; Greenville, South Carolina, US
- Died: Grayson County, Texas, US
- Occupation: Senator
- Years active: 1860s-?

William Blassingame

Member of the U.S. House of Representatives from 's 11 (Grayson and Cooke Counties) district
- In office 1876–1879

William Blassingame

Member of the U.S. House of Representatives from 's 11 district
- In office 1879–?

William Blassingame (January 13, 1836 – ?) was an American politician serving in the Texas legislature and as a delegate to the Texas Constitutional Convention of 1875. He was born to William Blassingame and Mary Earl Prince. He is not to be confused with a William Blassingame in the 1830s who was a sheriff in Alabama and South Carolina. At age 25, he enlisted as a private in the Confederate Army in 1861 and was an assistant surgeon in General Benjamin McCulloch's Missouri campaign. After the war, he moved to Texas from Versailles, Missouri and where he settled in Whitesboro, Texas with his wife, where he started his medical practice and occasionally farmed. In February 1876, he ran for Senate as a Democrat against the Republican Dr. Alexander Marshall, who had previously served a term in the Sixteenth Legislature, and Blassingame won by 1,000 votes more. In 1876, he also started as a member of the Fifteenth Legislature, covering Grayson County and Cooke County. He was also one of five medical doctors part of the Texas Senate when he was elected as a senator to the Sixteenth Texas Legislature in 1879 as a Grange delegate and previously had served as a delegate to the Constitutional Convention of 1875 as well as being a signer of the resulting constitution. At both the Fifteenth and Sixteenth Legislature, he represented the 11th district both times.

He is buried in the Blassingame family cemetery in Sandusky, Texas near Frisco.
