= Walter Moses Burton =

American politician (1840–1913)

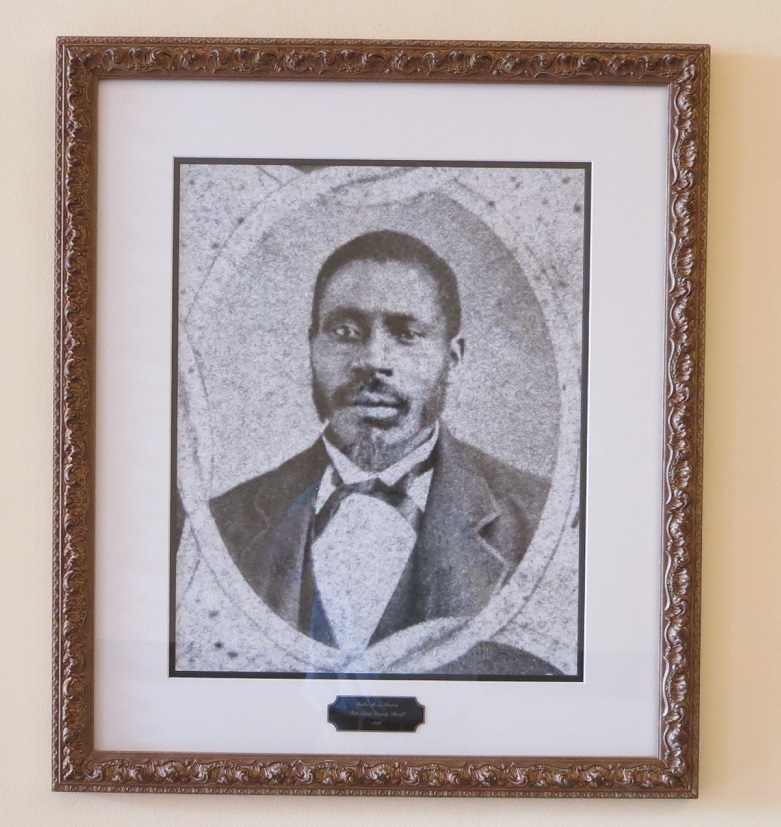
- Walter Moses Burton, Texas state senator, 1874–1883

Member of the Texas Senate from the 17th district
- In office April 18, 1876 – January 9, 1883
- Preceded by: Jewett H. Davenport
- Succeeded by: John Johnson

Member of the Texas Senate from the 13th district
- In office February 20, 1874 – April 18, 1876
- Preceded by: Francis J. Franks
- Succeeded by: Robert S. Guy

Personal details
- Born: August 9, 1840 North Carolina, US
- Died: June 4, 1913 (aged 72) Richmond, Texas, US
- Party: Republican

Walter Moses Burton (August 9, 1840 – June 4, 1913) was an American politician. Born a slave, he later served as a Republican in the Texas Senate.

== Biography ==
Burton was born into slavery, on August 8, 1840, in North Carolina. He was brought to Texas about 1850. His enslaver, Thomas Burke Burton, a plantation owner in Fort Bend County, taught him to read and write. After Emancipation, Thomas Burton sold Walter Burton several large plots of land for $1,900 (equivalent to $37,655 in 2025), and this made Walter Burton one of the wealthiest landowners in the county.

In 1868, Burton married Abby "Hattie" Jones. She was a well-known figure: in 1871, she survived being thrown from a moving train after refusing to leave the "Whites only" car.

Burton became active in Republican politics and in 1869 he was elected as the sheriff and tax collector in Fort Bend County. He was the first Black elected sheriff in the United States. Burton served as sheriff for four years, while also serving as Treasurer in the Texas House of Councils.

From 1874 to 1875 and 1876 to 1882, Burton served as a Texas state senator in a district that included Fort Bend, Austin, Waller, and Wharton counties. As a senator, he championed Black education and worked with state Representative William H. Holland to pass a bill founding Prairie View Normal School (now Prairie View A&M University). He also advocated for sensible gun control and the end of convict leasing.

After leaving office, he returned to farming, but continued to be active in the Republican party until his death in 1913. He is buried in the Morton Cemetery in Richmond, Texas.

In 1992, the Texas Historical Commission erected a marker at his grave. In 1996, Fort Bend Independent School District named an elementary school in his honor.

== See also ==
- Jaybird-Woodpecker War
- African American officeholders from the end of the Civil War until before 1900
