= Thomas Beck (politician) =

American politician

Texas State Representative for District 15 (Grimes County)
- In office January 13, 1874 – April 18, 1876

Texas State Representative for District 30 (Grimes County)
- In office January 14, 1879 – January 9, 1883

Personal details
- Born: c. 1819
- Party: Republican
- Spouse: Martha
- Occupation: farmer

Military service
- Branch/service: Confederate Army

Thomas Beck (born c. 1819, date of death unknown) was an American Republican politician who served three terms in the Texas House of Representatives. Various sources list his birthplace as Kentucky, Mississippi, or Virginia. He moved to Texas about 1842 and began farming in Grimes County.

According to his biographical sketch in the 1879 Texas Legislative Manual, he served in the Confederate Army for four months at Fort Smith, Arkansas. During his time in the legislature he served on the following committees: Privileges and Elections, Agriculture and Stock Raising, and Roads, Bridges, and Ferries. He also supported funding for what is now the historically black Prairie View A&M University in Prairie View, Texas. He worked to pass legislation which prevents children from being employed without the permission of their parents. Beck and his wife, Martha, had at least three children.

He and 51 other African American Texas state officeholders from the 19th century are commemorated on a memorial dedicated in 2010.

== See also ==
- African American officeholders from the end of the Civil War until before 1900
