= Sabine National Forest =

National forest in east Texas

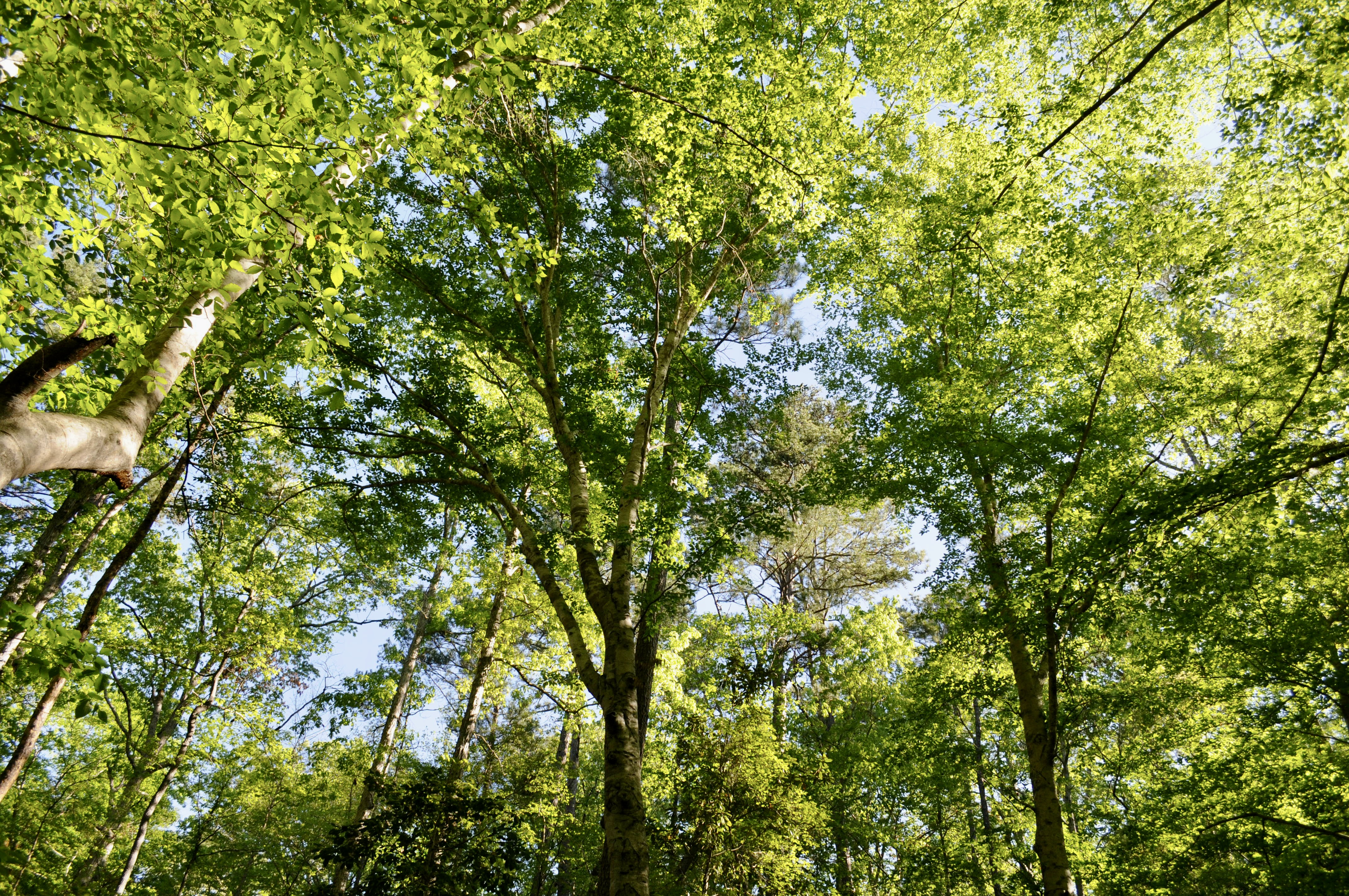
- American beech (Fagus grandifolia var. caroliniana), Sabine National Forest

- Location within the United States Location within Texas
- Location: Texas, U.S.
- Nearest city: Hemphill, TX
- Coordinates: 31°20′27″N 93°50′32″W
- Area: 160,873 acres (651.03 km^{2})
- Established: October 13, 1936
- Governing body: U.S. Forest Service
- Website: Sabine National Forest

Sabine National Forest is located in East Texas near the Texas-Louisiana border. The forest is administered together with the other three United States national forests and two national grasslands located entirely in Texas, from common offices in Lufkin, Texas. There are local ranger district offices located in Hemphill.

The forest covers a total of 160,873 acres (651.03 km^{2}) in five counties - Sabine (95,410 acres), Shelby (59,037 acres), San Augustine (4,317 acres), Newton (1,781 acres), and Jasper (64 acres). The Sabine National Forest is notable for extensive forests of American beech and other hardwood trees. Other important tree species include loblolly pine, longleaf pine, shortleaf pine, white oak, southern red oak, sweetgum, and Florida maple.

The Civilian Conservation Corps (CCC) helped the Texas Forest Service develop the forest between 1933 and 1940. CCC Company 893 established camp near Pineland, Texas on June 14, 1933, and planted pine seedlings in the southern part of the forest. These men also built roads and fire lookout towers and completed the Red Hills Lake Recreation Area near Toledo Bend Reservoir. CCC Company 880 established camp near Center, Texas on October 26, 1933, and planted thousands of pine trees in an area that became the northern part of Sabine National Forest. The CCC built the Boles Field Campground, including a pavilion and amphitheater, in the forest near Shelbyville, Texas.

The Trail Between the Lakes is a hiking trail located in the southern portion of the national forest. It spans 28 miles between the Lakeview Recreation Area on Toledo Bend Reservoir, westward to US Highway 96, about 0.25 miles from the easternmost point of Sam Rayburn Reservoir. It was first conceived in 1981, with the final section completed in the fall 1990. It transects a variety of plant communities, topography, and streams with opportunities for birding and wildlife viewing. The trail is for hiking and primitive camping only, mountain bikes, horses, and off-road vehicles are not permitted.

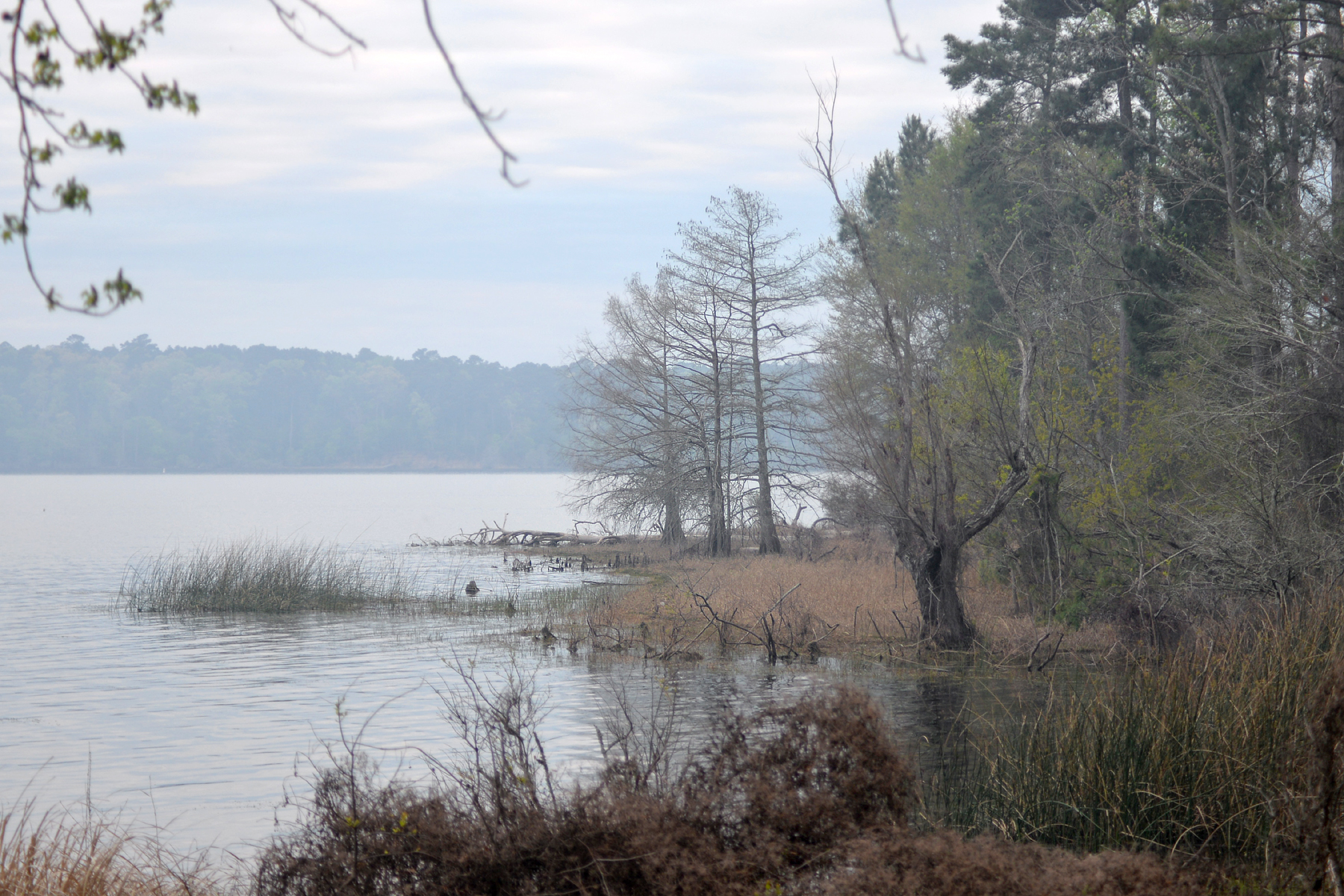
An inlet of Toledo Bend Reservoir, Indian Mounds Wilderness, Sabine National Forest.

The Indian Mounds Wilderness was officially designated as part of the National Wilderness Preservation System in 1984. The wilderness includes about 12,000 acres of low ridges and slopes with three drainages, Indian Creek, Bull Creek, and Hurricane Bayou. The area is named after four mounds, some as high as 40 feet, located to the southeast, just outside of the designated wilderness area. Locals once believed the mounds were earthworks constructed by the Caddoan Mississippian culture, however, archaeologists subsequently confirmed that they are natural formations and not Caddoan earthworks. A 1994 publication identified four champion trees in the wilderness area, three state champions, a flatwoods plum (Prunus umbellata), a Florida sugar maple (Acer floridanum), and an eastern hop-hornbeam (Ostrya virginiana), as well as the national champion little-hip hawthorn (Crataegus spathulata). Some of the last strongholds of mature black hickory (Carya texana) grow at higher elevations in the wilderness, while the slopes and lower elevations support the largest old growth forest of American beech (Fagus grandifolia) and southern magnolia (Magnolia grandiflora) in US national forest, a threatened and declining plant community. The forest floor is noted for supporting a particularly wealthy array of fungi, mosses, liverworts, wildflowers, and ferns.

== Fauna ==
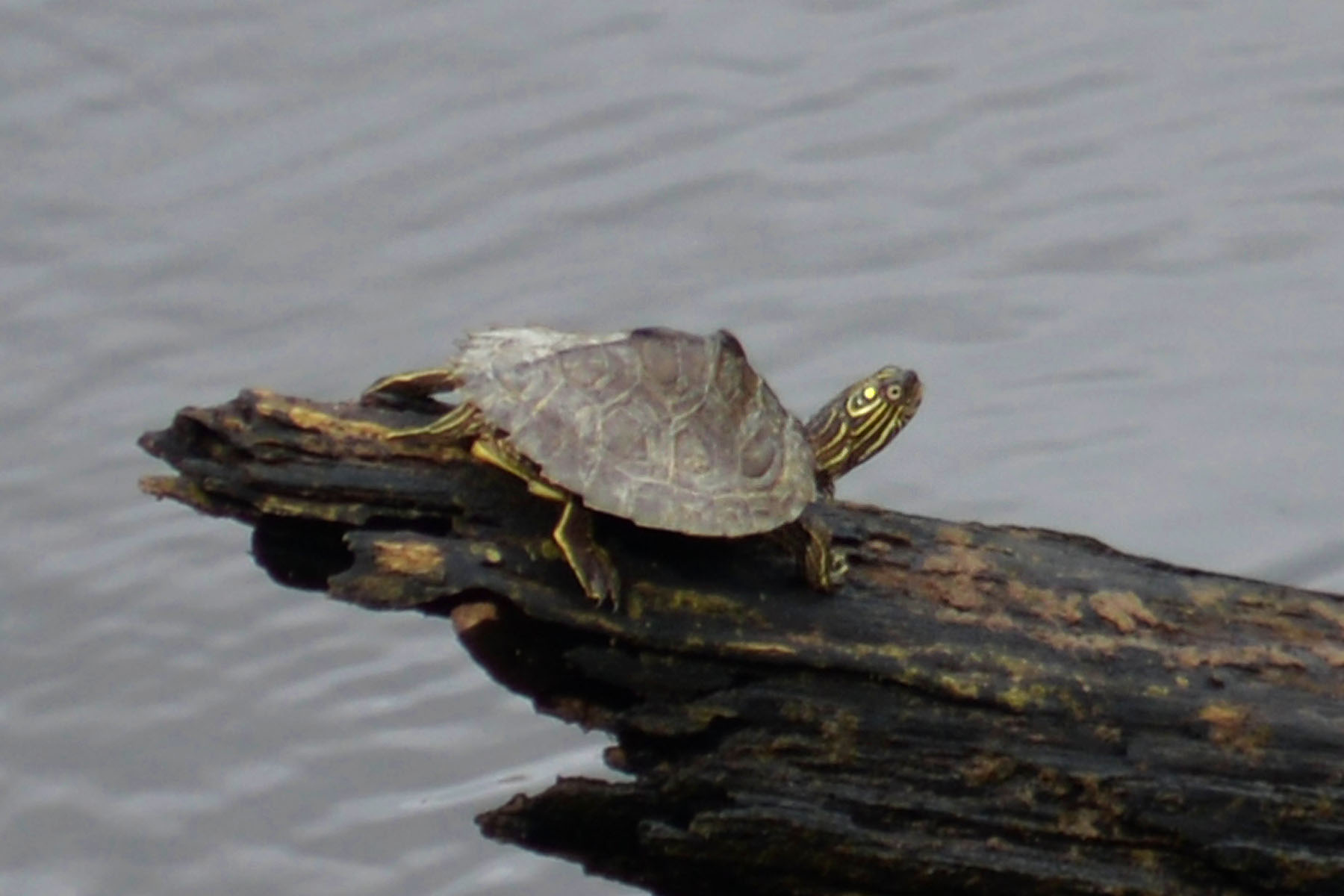
Sabine map turtle (Graptemys sabinensis)

Reptiles of piney woods in east Texas include a diverse variety of lizards and turtles such as coal skink (Plestiodon anthracinus), ground skink (Scincella lateralis), six-lined racerunner (Aspidoscelis sexlineatus), prairie lizard (Sceloporus consobrinus), alligator snapping turtle (Macrochelys temminckii), razor-backed musk turtle (Sternotherus carinatus), Sabine map turtle (Graptemys sabinensis), river cooter (Pseudemys concinna), three-toed box turtle (Terrapene triunguis), and smooth softshell turtle (Apalone mutica). Although not particularly abundant in the forest, American alligator (Alligator mississippiensis) may be present in any lake, river, bayou or large body of permanent water in east Texas.

Five species of venomous snakes occur throughout the forest of southeast Texas: Texas coralsnake (Micrurus tener), eastern copperhead (Agkistrodon contortrix), northern cottonmouth (Agkistrodon piscivorus), and less commonly timber rattlesnake (Crotalus horridus), and western pygmy rattlesnake (Sistrurus miliarius). A few of the harmless species include eastern hog-nosed snake (Heterodon platirhinos), prairie kingsnake (Lampropeltis calligaster), eastern coachwhip (Masticophis flagellum), broad banded watersnake (Nerodia fasciata), Texas ratsnake (Pantherophis obsoletus), red-bellied snake (Storeria occipitomaculata), and rough earthsnake (Virginia striatula).

Amphibians recorded in Sabine and Shelby counties include pickerel frog (Lithobates palustris), Cope’s gray treefrog (Hyla chrysoscelis), Cajun chorus frog (Pseudacris fouquettei), Fowler’s toad (Anaxyrus fowleri), spotted salamander (Ambystoma maculatum), three-toed amphiuma (Amphiuma tridactylum), and the Catahoula spotted dusky salamander (Desmognathus catahoula) [formerly D. conanti], a species that has been disappearing throughout much of its range in Texas.

The fish of Sabine National Forest are largely associated with the Sabine River drainage. Some of the species recorded in the area include southern brook lamprey (Ichthyomyzon gagei), Paddlefish (Polyodon spathula), spotted gar (Lepisosteus oculatus), black bullhead (Ameiurus melas), blue catfish (Ictalurus furcatus), chain pickerel (Esox niger), yellow bass (Morone mississippiensis), green sunfish (Lepomis cyanellus), Warmouth (Lepomis gulosus), dollar sunfish (Lepomis marginatus), and white crappie (Pomoxis annularis). A few of the smaller fish in the region include blacktail shiner (Cyprinella venusta), threadfin shad (Dorosoma petenense), Sabine shiner (Notropis sabinae), golden topminnow (Fundulus chrysotus), blackspotted topminnow (Fundulus olivaceus), redspot darter (Etheostoma artesiae), and bigscale logperch (Percina macrolepida).

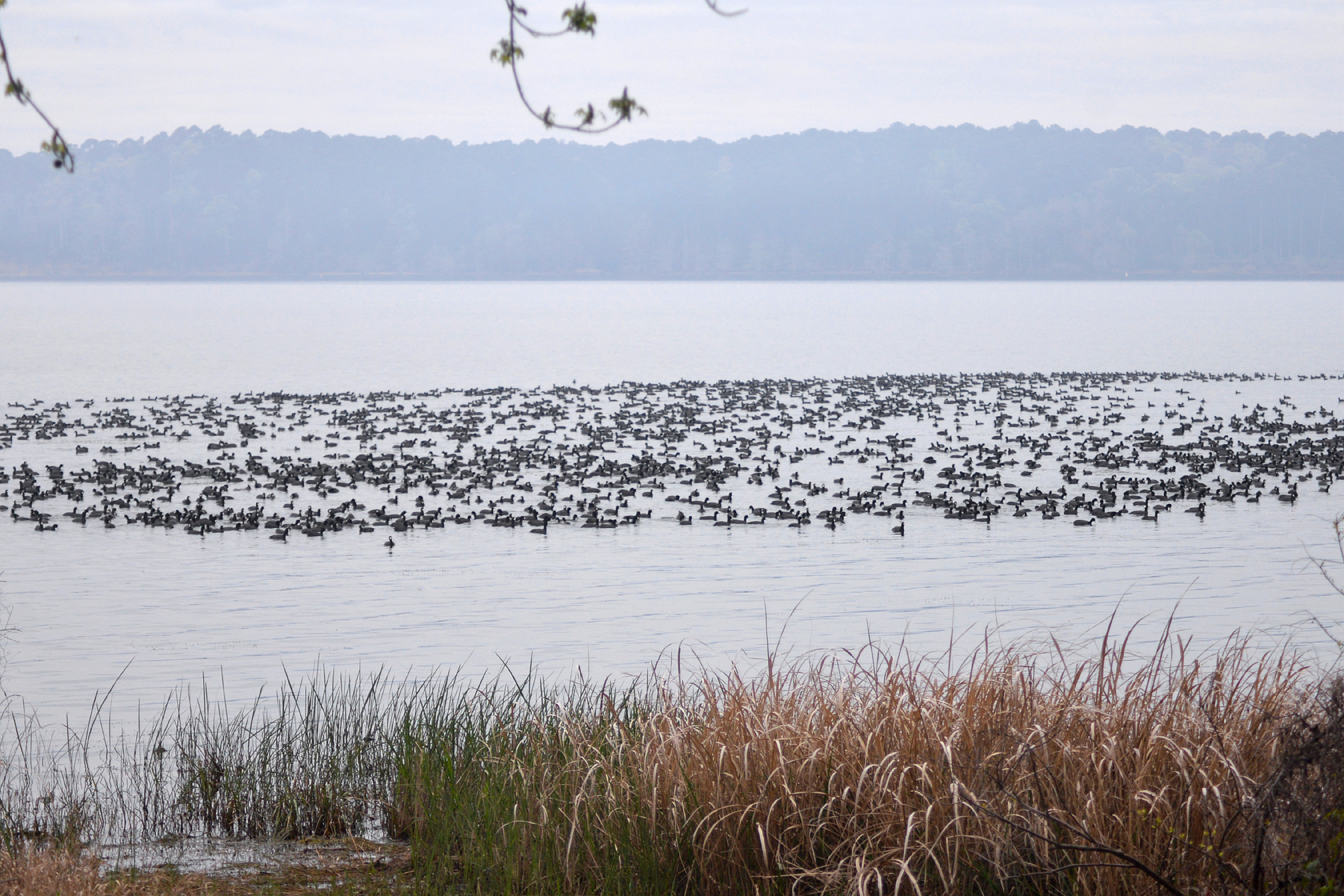
A raft of American Coots (Fulica americana) at dusk in Toledo Bend Reservoir, Sabine National Forest.

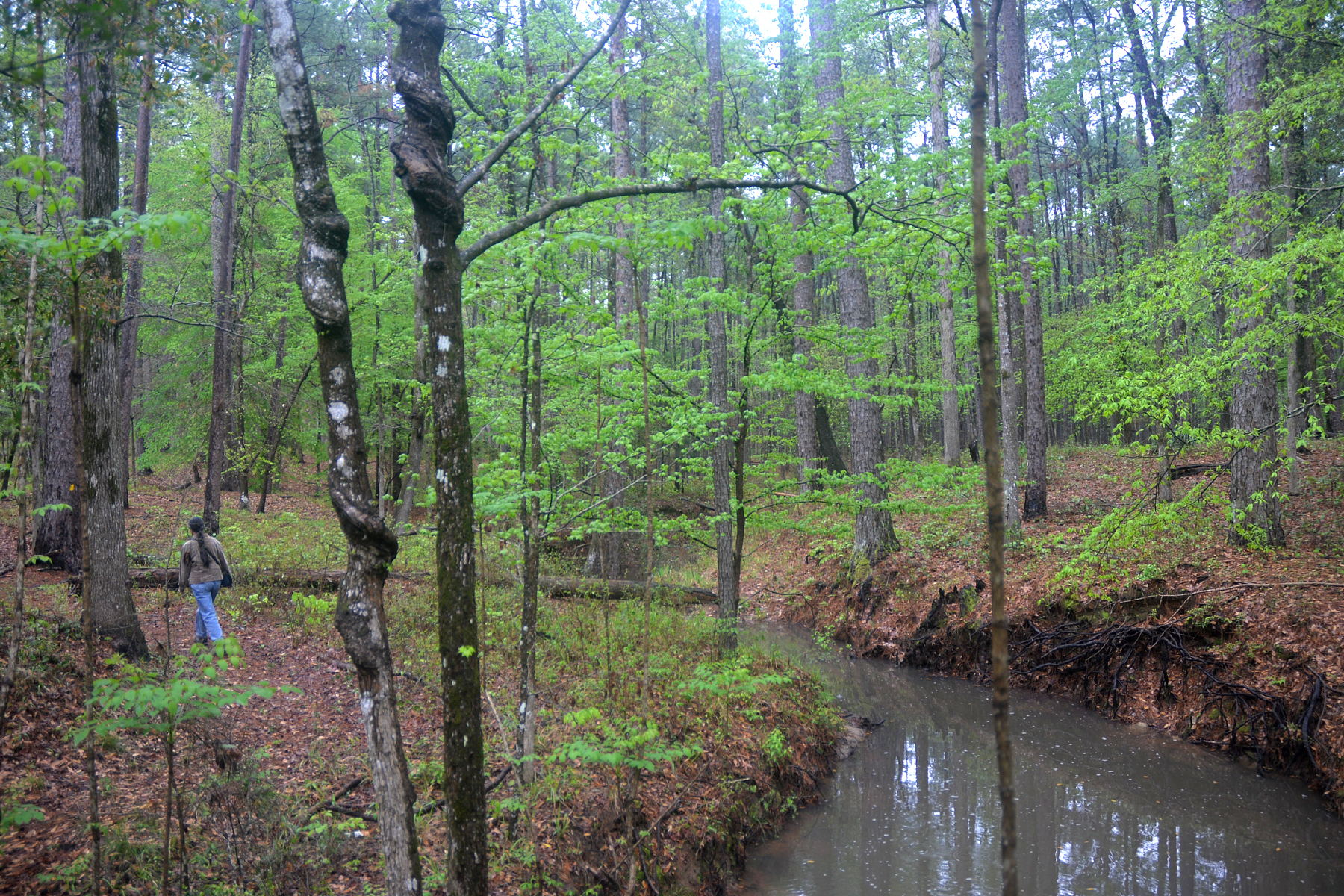
A hiker on the Trail Between the Lakes, Sabine National Forest.

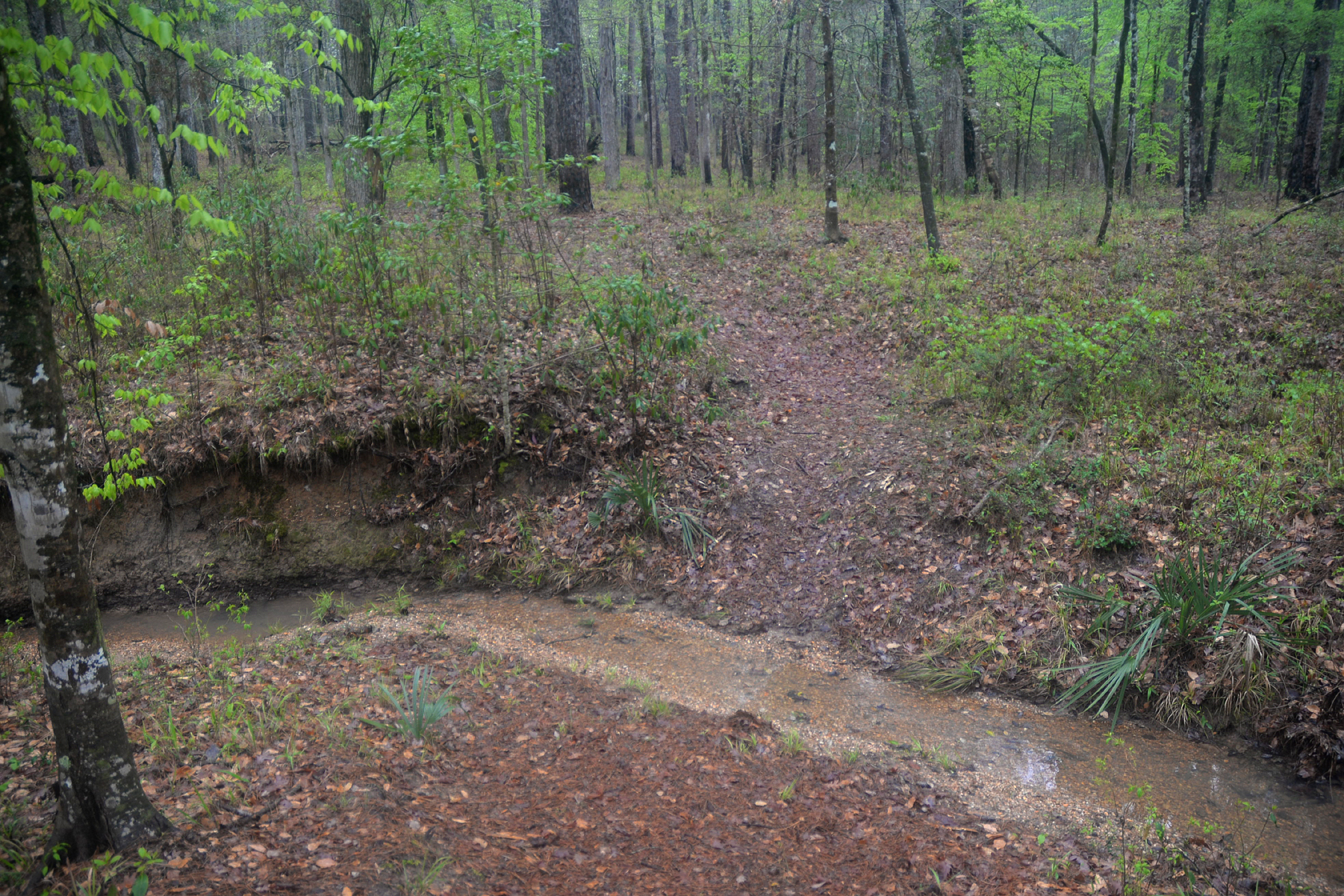
A creek crossing on the Trail Between the Lakes, Sabine National Forest.

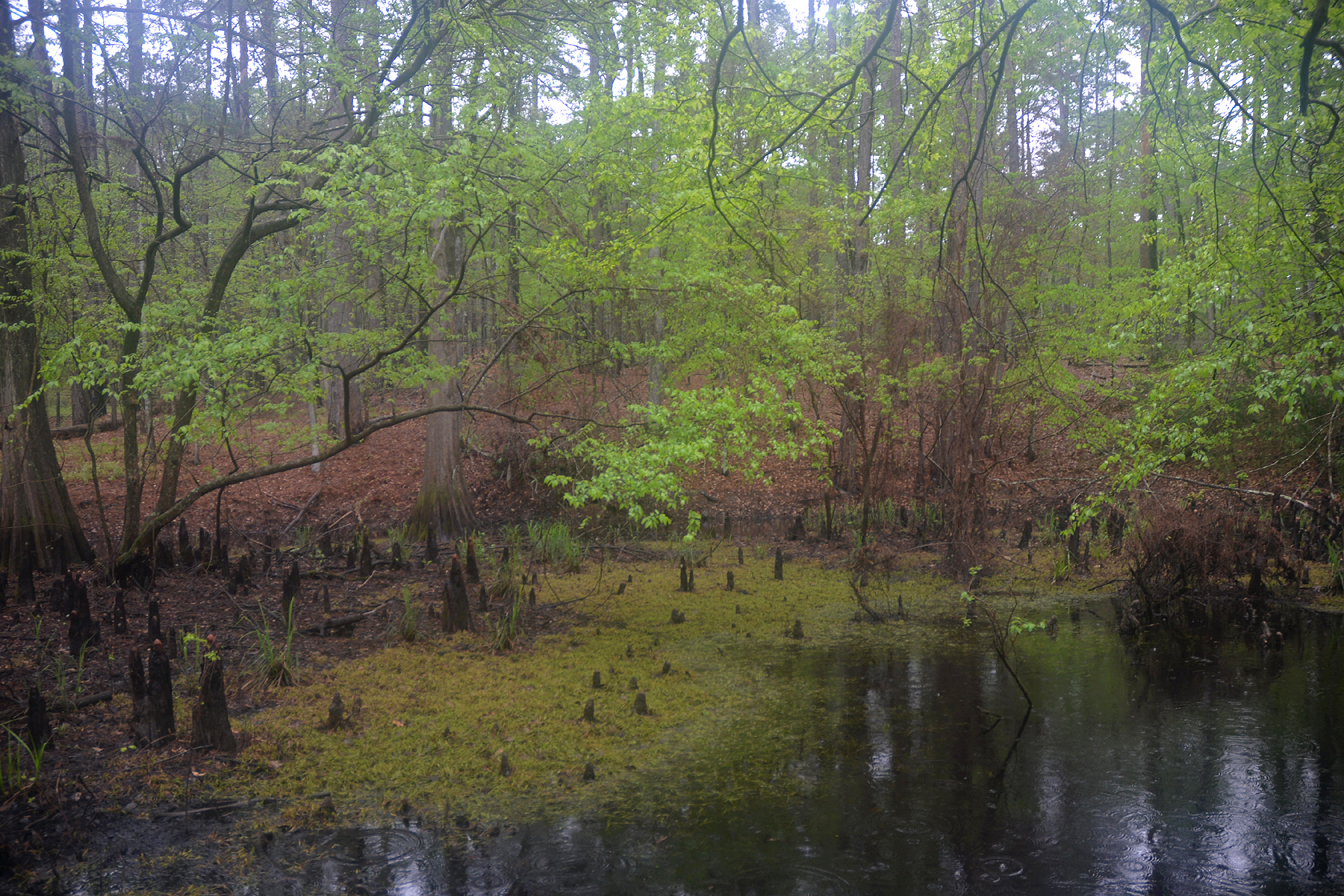
A cypress slough with sphagnum bog and blackwater, Sabine National Forest.

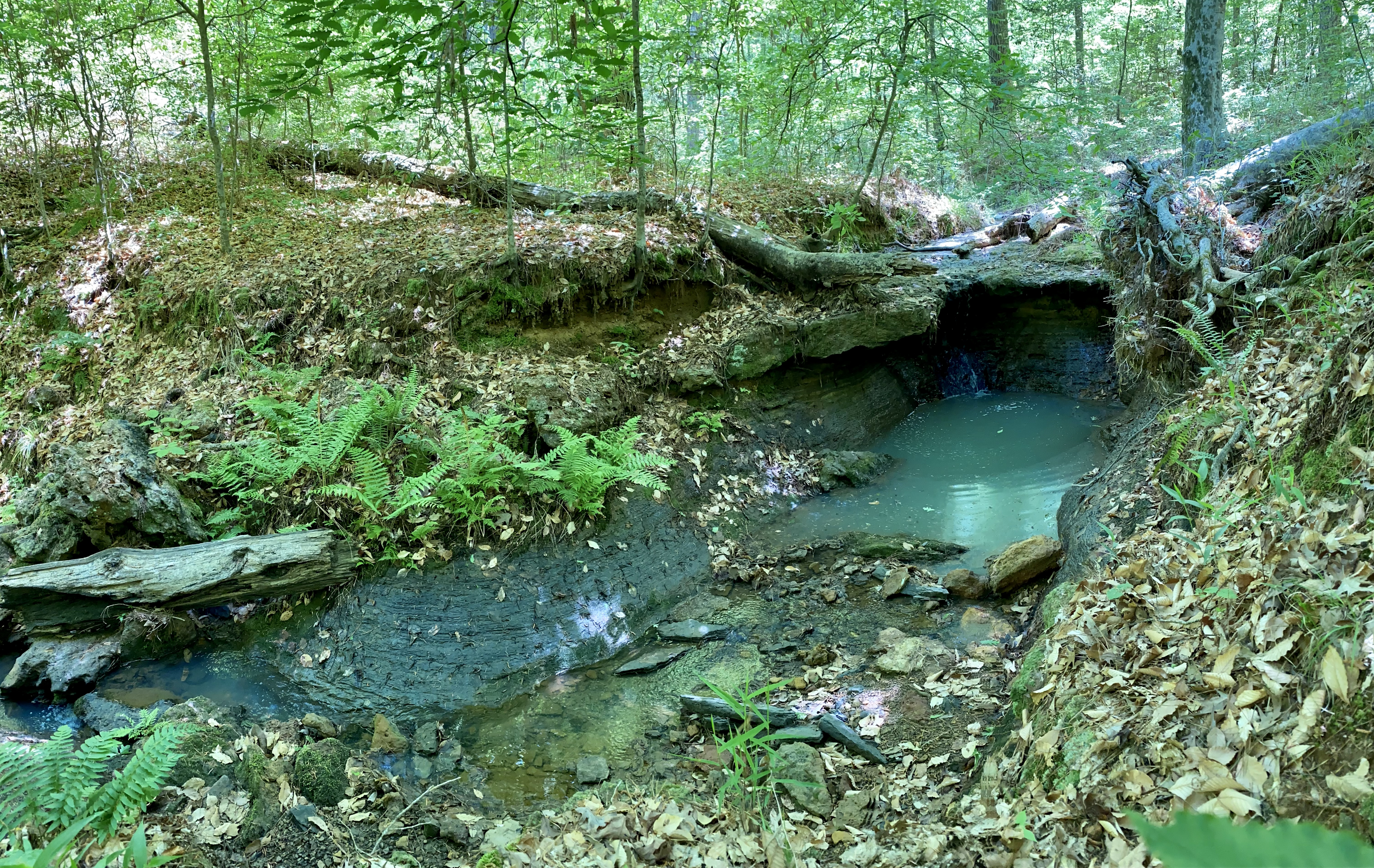
Colorow Creek, Sabine National Forest

== See also ==
- Texas Forest Trail
- List of national forests of the United States
