= Bayou darter =

Conservation status
- Endangered (IUCN 3.1)

Scientific classification
- Kingdom: Animalia
- Phylum: Chordata
- Class: Actinopterygii
- Division: Teleostei
- Order: Perciformes
- Family: Percidae
- Genus: Nothonotus
- Species: N. ruber

Binomial name
- Nothonotus ruber (Raney & Suttkus, 1966)

Synonyms
- Etheostoma rubrum; Nothonotus rubrus (lapsus)

Species of fish

The Bayou darter (Nothonotus ruber) is a rare species of freshwater ray-finned fish, a darter from the subfamily Etheostomatinae, part of the family Percidae, which also contains the perches, ruffes and pikeperches. It is endemic to western Mississippi in the United States, where it is found only in Bayou Pierre and its tributaries. Its typical habitat is fast-flowing creeks and streams, in riffles and in areas between riffles with firm gravel bottoms. It feeds on small insects and their larvae. Breeding probably takes place twice a year, in spring and late summer. The population of this fish is declining due to loss of suitable habitat. This is caused by siltation and pollution, particularly erosion caused by changes in land use. The International Union for Conservation of Nature has assessed its conservation status as being "endangered".

== Description ==
This species can reach a length of 5.5 centimetres (2.2 in) TL.

== Distribution and habitat ==
The Bayou darter is endemic to the drainage of Bayou Pierre, a tributary of the Mississippi River. This fish is present in several tributaries flowing into Bayou Pierre including White Oak Creek, Foster Creek, and Turkey Creek. It lives in fast flowing, shallow areas of its native streams. It can be found in riffles and in the water between riffles in areas with firm gravel substrates. Associated fish species include brighteye darter (Etheostoma lynceum), least madtom (Noturus hildebrandi), bluntface shiner (Cyprinella camura), and redspot darter (Etheostoma artesiae).

== Behavior ==
Spawning occurs in April through May and sometimes into August. The female lays up to 75 eggs, and probably spawns at least twice during the spawning season. The fish lives about 3 years, with the male living slightly longer than the female on average. This species has low genetic diversity.

The Bayou darter eats insects and their larvae, including caddisflies, blackflies, midges, and mayflies. It increases its food consumption in the time leading up to spawning.

== Status ==
The main threat to the species is the alteration of its habitat by human beings. The Bayou Pierre is currently experiencing heavy erosion, particularly headcutting, in which erosion moves upstream in waves. Channeling, dredging and mining on the adjacent floodplains cause some alteration. These processes cause an increase in sediment. Petroleum exploration has affected the area. Agriculture, especially silviculture affect the area by destroying riparian habitat, causing erosion and increasing sedimentation. This process destroys the riffles the fish occupies, and creates new riffles elsewhere, causing the fish population to move. Fertilizers and herbicides may enter the water. As a consequence of these factors, the IUCN has listed the Bayou darter as "Endangered" and considers that further habitat and population monitoring programs should be undertaken to protect the fish and its habitat.
