= Acer barbatum =

Acer barbatum is a confused scientific name for a North American maple.

- A plant originally described by André Michaux in 1803, a synonym of Acer saccharum
- A plant originally described by William Jackson Hooker in 1831, a synonym of Acer glabrum
- A plant so named in some texts, a synonym of Acer floridanum
