= 1952 Texas lieutenant gubernatorial election =

- November 4, 1952

Nominee	Ben Ramsey	Ben Ramsey (Note: Ramsey and the entire state Democratic ticket were endorsed by the state Republican party and appeared on their ballots)
Party	Democratic	Republican
Popular vote	1,541,007	460,034
Percentage	76.98%	22.98%
Lieutenant Governor before election
Ben Ramsey
Democratic
Elected Lieutenant Governor
Ben Ramsey
Democratic

The 1952 Texas lieutenant gubernatorial election was held on November 4, 1952, in order to elect the lieutenant governor of Texas. Incumbent Democratic lieutenant governor Ben Ramsey won re-election as he faced no opposition. The Republican Party endorsed the Democratic state ticket, including Ramsey, in order to attract more votes for their presidential nominee, General Dwight D. Eisenhower.

== General election ==
On election day, November 4, 1952, incumbent Democratic lieutenant governor Ben Ramsey won re-election as the state Republican Party, in an attempt to maximize support for Eisenhower, nominated the Democratic state ticket, allowing voters to cast a straight GOP ballot without voting against the down-ballot Democratic candidates, thereby retaining Democratic control over the office of lieutenant governor. Ramsey was sworn in for his second term on January 20, 1953.

=== Results ===
Texas lieutenant gubernatorial election, 1952
Party	Candidate	Votes	%
Democratic	Ben Ramsey (incumbent)	1,541,007	76.98
Republican	Ben Ramsey (incumbent)	460,034	22.98
	Scattering	849	0.04
Total votes		2,001,890	100.00
Democratic hold			
