= Texas Forest Trail =

American non-profit organization

- Founder: Texas Historical Commission
- Purpose: Tourism, Economic Development and Historical Preservation
- Location: Nacogdoches, Texas
- Website: www.texasforesttrail.com

The Texas Forest Trail is a non-profit organization which promotes heritage tourism, economic development, and historic preservation. The organization is one of ten driving trail regions which make up the award-winning Heritage Trails Program of the Texas Historical Commission.

== History ==
In 1968 Texas hosted the World's fair, known as HemisFair '68, in San Antonio, Texas. In connection with this boost in international attention, the Texas Department of Transportation designated ten 650-mile circular driving regions that encompassed the entire state of Texas. These trails saw little attention after their creation until in the late 1990s when the Texas Historical Commission adopted these trails as their Heritage Trail Program. The Texas Forts Trail was the first of the ten trails to be reinstated.

The 35-county Forest Trail Region historically is known for people such as the Caddo Indians and Spanish explorer Alonso de Leon. The region has been called the gateway to Texas, with borders with Oklahoma, Arkansas and Louisiana. The region is named for the four national and five state forests located in this region.

Also located within the region is the site of the first Spanish mission in East Texas, Mission San Francisco de los Tejas. Established in 1690 on San Pedro Creek near the Neches River by Franciscan friars, the purpose of the mission was twofold. Aside from the primary objective of converting the local Nabedache Indians to Christianity, the mission functioned additionally as bulwark against any potential French attempt to claim the region as their own. The mission was ultimately unsuccessful due to steadily declining relations between the Spanish and the Nabedache, who blamed the Spanish for bringing sickness to their tribe. This prompted the Spanish to destroy the mission.

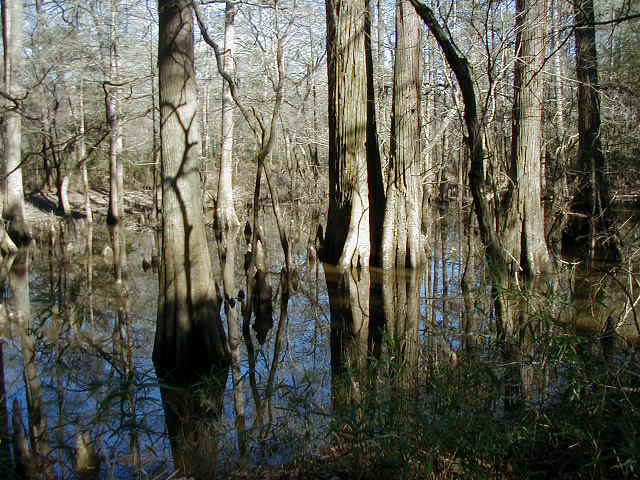
Big Thicket National Preserve

== Forests ==
- Angelina National Forest
- Sam Houston National Forest
- Sabine National Forest
- Davy Crockett National Forest
- I. D. Fairchild State Forest
- Jones State Forest
- John Henry Kirby State Forest
- Masterson State Forest
- E. O. Siecke Rate Forest
