= List of Texas state forests =

== Texas state forests and arboretums ==
Name (by alphabetical order)	Location (of main entrance)
E.O. Siecke State Forest	Newton County
I.D. Fairchild State Forest	Cherokee County
John Henry Kirby Memorial State Forest	Tyler County
Masterson State Forest	Jasper County
W. Goodrich Jones State Forest	Montgomery County
Ruth Bowling Nichols Arboretum	Cherokee County
Olive Scott Petty Arboretum	Hardin County

== See also ==
- List of national forests of the United States
