= 1956 Texas lieutenant gubernatorial election =

- November 6, 1956
Nominee	Ben Ramsey
Party	Democratic
Popular vote	1,447,266
Percentage	99.98%
Lieutenant Governor before election
Ben Ramsey
Democratic
Elected Lieutenant Governor
Ben Ramsey
Democratic

The 1956 Texas lieutenant gubernatorial election was held on November 6, 1956, in order to elect the lieutenant governor of Texas. Incumbent Democratic lieutenant governor Ben Ramsey won re-election as he faced no opposition.

== General election ==
On election day, November 6, 1956, incumbent Democratic lieutenant governor Ben Ramsey won re-election as he faced no opposition, thereby retaining Democratic control over the office of lieutenant governor. Ramsey was sworn in for his fourth term on January 15, 1957.

=== Results ===
Texas lieutenant gubernatorial election, 1956
Party	Candidate	Votes	%
Democratic	Ben Ramsey (incumbent)	1,447,266	99.98
	Scattering	234	0.02
Total votes		1,447,500	100.00
Democratic hold			
