= Henry Lewis Darwin =

American politician (1886–1945)

Member of the Texas Senate
- In office January 11, 1921 – January 13, 1925
- Preceded by: Flavius M. Gibson
- Succeeded by: I. D. Fairchild
- Constituency: 3rd district
- In office January 14, 1913 – January 9, 1917
- Preceded by: John L. Ratliff
- Succeeded by: Charles R. Floyd
- Constituency: 2nd district

Personal details
- Born: December 21, 1886 Delta County, Texas, U.S.
- Died: February 6, 1945 (aged 58)
- Resting place: Cooper, Texas
- Party: Democratic

Henry Lewis Darwin (December 21, 1886 — February 6, 1945) was a Texas Democratic politician who served in the Texas Senate.

== Personal life ==
On December 21, 1886, Henry Lewis Darwin was born in Delta County, Texas. He was a staunch supporter of the University of Texas. He died on February 6, 1945, and is buried in Cooper, Texas.

== Political career ==
During the 33rd Texas legislature (1913−1917), Darwin represented Texas Senate district 2, which was composed of Fannin County and Lamar County. He would later go on to serve Texas Senate district 3 during the 37th legislature (1921−1935), representing Delta County, Franklin County, Hopkins County, Red River County, and Titus County. He was a member of the Democratic Party.
