= John S. Redditt =

American politician and businessman (1899–1973)

Member of the Texas Senate from the 3rd district
- In office January 10, 1933 – January 14, 1941
- Preceded by: William E. Thomason
- Succeeded by: Ben Ramsey
President pro tempore
President pro tempore of the Texas Senate
In office May 11, 1935 – September 16, 1935
Preceded by	Kenneth M. Regan
Succeeded by	Will M. Martin

Personal details
- Born: John Sayers Redditt; April 4, 1899 Center, Texas, U.S.
- Died: April 13, 1973 (aged 74) Lufkin, Texas, U.S.
- Resting place: Lufkin, Texas
- Party: Democratic
- Spouse: Hazel Lee Spears (m. 1928)
- Children: 2
- Relatives: Joseph D. Sayers (great-uncle)
- Education: University of Texas, Austin (LLB)

Military service
- Allegiance: United States
- Branch/service: United States Army
- Battles/wars: World War I

John Sayers Redditt (April 4, 1899 – April 13, 1973) was an American politician and businessman. He served in the Texas Senate for District 3.

== Personal life and business career ==
John Sayers Redditt was born on April 4, 1899, in Center, Texas, to John David and Lewis Permellia Redditt. His great-uncle is Joseph D. Sayers. In 1921, Redditt graduated from University of Texas Law School with a Bachelor of Laws, and opened a law practice in Lufkin, Texas. On December 27, 1928, Redditt married Hazel Lee Spears; they had two daughters together. He served in the United States Army during World War I. In 1947, Redditt founded Winn's Variety Stores, located in San Antonio, Texas. He died on April 13, 1973, in Lufkin, Texas.

== Political career ==
Redditt represented District 3 in the Texas Senate during the 43rd, 44th, 45th, and 46th legislatures. He was also President pro tempore of the Texas Senate during part of the 44th legislature.

Redditt served numerous state offices during his political career. He served as chairman of the Texas Economy Commission and chairman of the Texas Highway Commission. Between 1961 and 1964, he was a regent of the University of Texas. He was a commission member on the Texas Commission on Higher Education, and he served as president of the Texas Good Roads Association. Redditt throughout his political career was affiliated with the Democratic Party.

Political offices
Preceded by Kenneth M. Regan	President pro tempore of the Texas Senate; May 11, 1935 – September 16, 1935	Succeeded by Will M. Martin
Preceded by William E. Thomason	Texas Senate for District 3 January 10, 1933 – January 14, 1941	Succeeded by Ben Ramsey
