= Oliver H. Cross =

American politician (1868–1960)

Oliver Harlan Cross
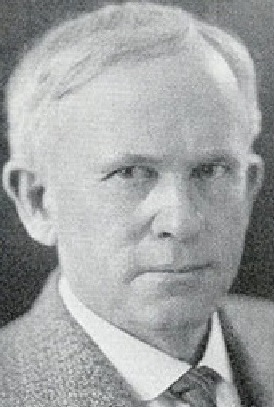
- From 1935's Pictorial Directory of 74th Congress

Member of the U.S. House of Representatives
- In office March 4, 1929 – January 3, 1937

Personal details
- Born: July 13, 1868 Eutaw, Alabama
- Died: April 24, 1960 (aged 91) Waco, Texas
- Party: Democratic
- Children: Harlan Watt Cross (1911–2003), Mary Agusta Cross (1913–2002)
- Education: University of Alabama at Tuscaloosa (B.A.)
- Profession: Lawyer, Politician

Oliver Harlan Cross (July 13, 1868 – April 24, 1960) was a U.S. Representative from Texas.

Born in Eutaw, Alabama, Cross attended the public schools and was graduated from the University of Alabama at Tuscaloosa in 1891. He was a teacher in the public schools at Union Springs, Alabama, in 1891 and 1892. He studied law. He was admitted to the bar in 1893 and commenced practice in Deming, New Mexico. He moved to McGregor, Texas, in 1894 and continued the practice of law. He served as city attorney of McGregor in 1895 and 1896. He moved to Waco, Texas, in 1896 and continued the practice of law. He served as assistant attorney of McLennan County, Texas 1898-1902. He served as member of the State house of representatives in 1900. He served as district attorney of McLennan County 1902-1906. He retired from law practice in 1917 and assumed agricultural pursuits.

Cross was elected as a Democrat to the Seventy-first and to the three succeeding Congresses (March 4, 1929 – January 3, 1937). Cross was an advocate for agricultural reforms and famously petitioned Herbert Hoover to pass reforms that would benefit the farmers of America.

He was not a candidate for renomination in 1936. He died in Waco, Texas, April 24, 1960. He was interred in Hearne Cemetery, Hearne, Texas.

== Sources ==
- United States Congress. "Oliver H. Cross (id: C000931)". Biographical Directory of the United States Congress.

U.S. House of Representatives
Preceded by Tom T. Connally	Member of the U.S. House of Representatives from Texas's 11th congressional district 1929-1937	Succeeded by William R. Poage
