= I. D. Fairchild State Forest =

Nature Preserve in Central East Texas

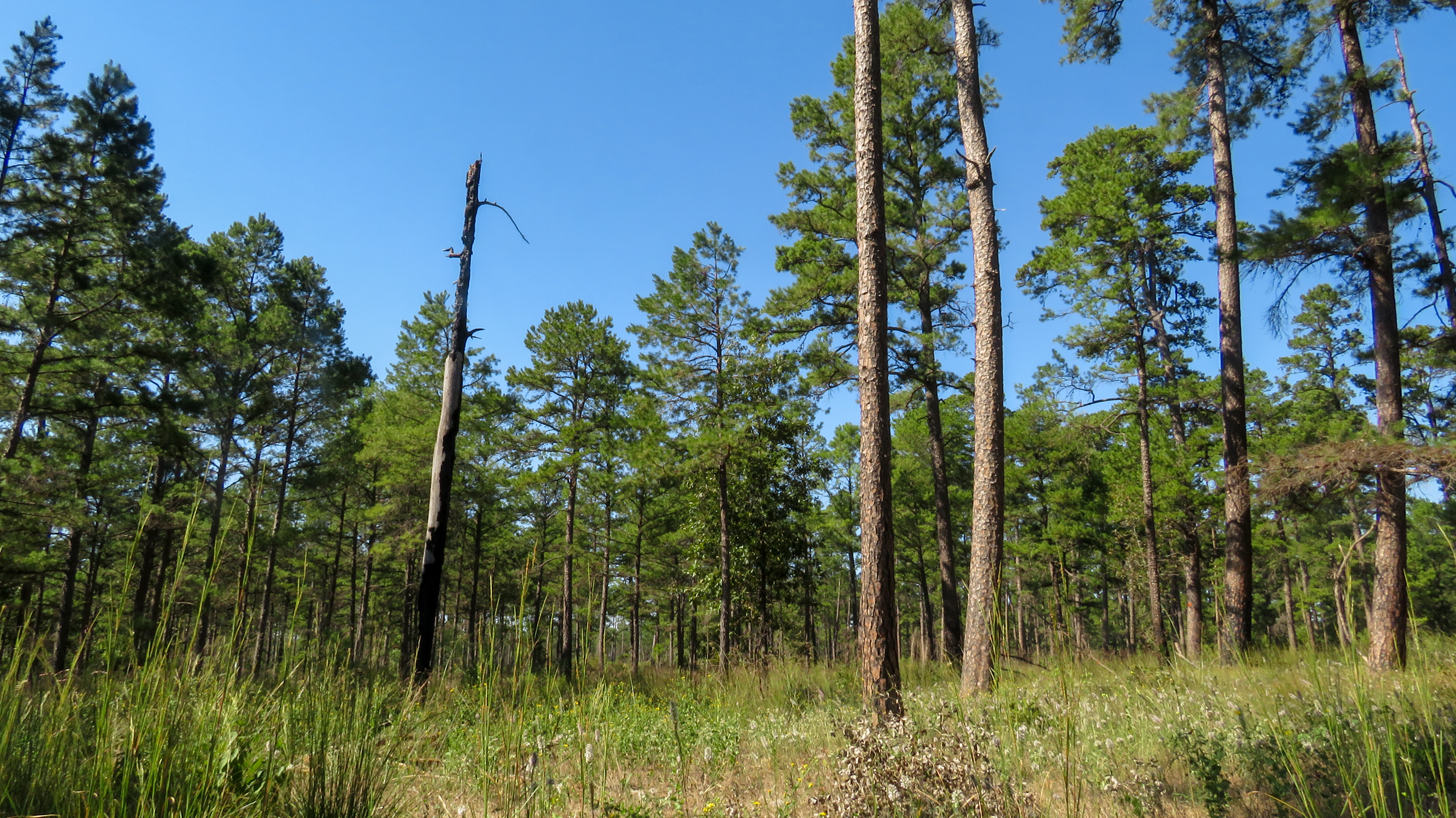
- Shortleaf Pine Savanna in the Forest

- Location within Texas
- Location: Cherokee County, TX, USA
- Nearest city: Rusk
- Coordinates: 31.7828°N 95.3650°W
- Area: 2,760 acres (11.2 km^{2})
- Established: 1926
- Governing body: Texas A&M Forest Service

I.D. Fairchild State Forest is a 2,760-acre (1,120 ha) nature preserve in Cherokee County, Texas. It is the largest state forest in Texas and includes 10 miles of hiking trails. The main unit is located just west of the community of Maydelle on Texas State Highway 84. It is open to the public for hiking, horseback riding, picnicking, wildlife viewing, and biking. The Texas A&M Forest Service uses the area for demonstration and research as well as to conserve southern yellow pine ecosystems. The Texas State Railroad also runs through the forest.

== History ==
=== Prison Camp ===
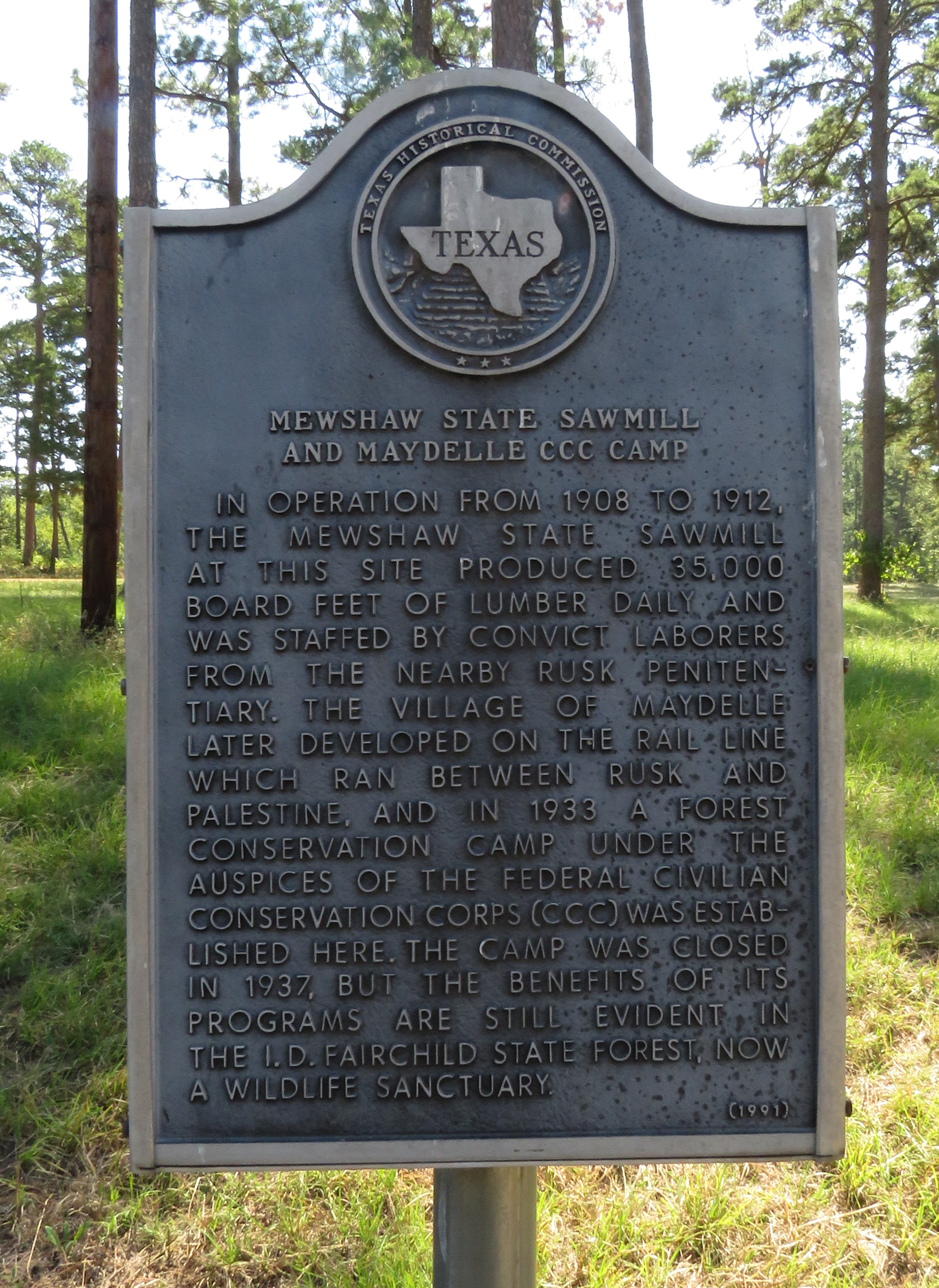
Historical marker detailing the Mewshaw State Sawmill and Maydelle CCC camp at what is now the I.D. Fairchild State Forest in Cherokee County, Texas.

White settlement began in the area surrounding the Forest circa 1840s, but developments in the Forest proper did not begin until the 1900s. Beginning in 1906, the Texas State Railroad was built between Palestine and Rusk. The land that became the Forest was then acquired by the Texas prison system, where a branch prison called Camp Wright was built. Twenty-five years earlier, in 1881, Rusk Penitentiary had been constructed by the state. Prison operators planned on running an iron foundry for revenue at the prison, which required the railway. In 1908, the state built the Minshew State Sawmill on the site, and timber was cut to supply charcoal for the foundry at the penitentiary in Rusk. Forced convict labor was used to construct and operate the foundry and mill until it burned in 1912. 35,000 feet of lumber was processed per day while it was operational. The area remained in the hands of the Prison system until 1926 when it was transferred to the Texas A&M Forest Service.

=== CCC Camp ===
Once in the hand of the Forest Service the land was designated State Forest #3. On June 6, 1933, the Civilian Conservation Corps founded a camp in the Forest's main unit. Workers from camp S-54, Company 833, were tasked with fire protection for nearly 300,000 acres of forest in the area. They also with built and maintained roads, telephone poles and lines, fire towers, and sold firewood. The camp was in operation until December 14, 1947. The CCC continued to host meetings in the Forest into the mid 1950s, when most of the buildings were dismantled.

=== State Forest ===
In 1956, the state dedicated the Forest to legislator I.D. Fairchild of Lufkin, who died in a car accident in 1928.

== Ecology and Wildlife ==
The bulk of the habitat protected by the Forest are mature stands of open pine savanna, principally made up of shortleaf pine (Pinus echinata), a declining species. Shortleaf pine ecosystems are fire-adapted and support a wide range of biodiversity. Decline of this ecosystem in East Texas is principally due to urbanization and fire-suppression. This habitat supports a clutch of the endangered Red-Cockaded Woodpeckers (Dryobates borealis) in the Forest. Successful reintroduction efforts in the area date back to the 1980s.

Other bird species known to frequent the Forest include woodpeckers, warblers, summer tanagers, buntings, and vireos, according to Texas Parks and Wildlife. Common butterflies include swallowtails, crescents, and painted ladies'. The Forest also hosts a wide diversity of wildflowers including back-eyed susans and dayflowers. The Forest also includes numerous creeks and bottomland hardwood forests.

== See also ==
- List of Texas State Forests
- Texas Forest Trail
