= William R. Poage =

American politician (1899–1987)

William Robert Poage
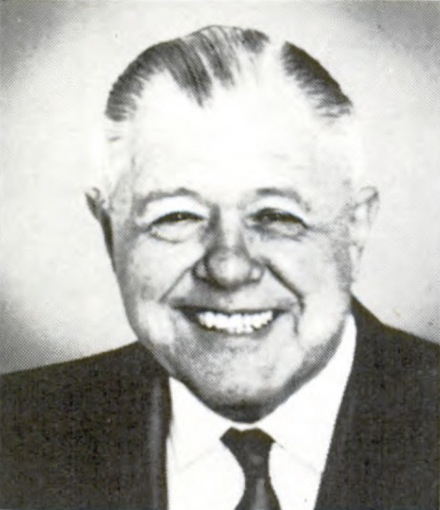

Member of the U.S. House of Representatives from Texas's 11th district
- In office January 3, 1937 – December 31, 1978
- Preceded by: Oliver H. Cross
- Succeeded by: Marvin Leath

Chairman of the House Committee on Agriculture
- In office January 3, 1967 – January 3, 1975
- Preceded by: Harold D. Cooley
- Succeeded by: Thomas S. Foley

Member of the Texas State Senate from the 13th district
- In office January 13, 1931 – January 12, 1937
- Preceded by: I. D. Fairchild
- Succeeded by: William R. Newton, Sr.

Member of the Texas House of Representatives from the 2nd district
- In office January 13, 1925 – January 8, 1929
- Preceded by: Tom Shires
- Succeeded by: Frank Baldwin

Personal details
- Born: William Robert Poage; December 28, 1899 Waco, Texas, U.S.
- Died: January 3, 1987 (aged 87) Temple, Texas, U.S.
- Party: Democratic
- Spouse: Frances Cotton
- Education: Baylor University (AB, LLB)

William Robert Poage (December 28, 1899 – January 3, 1987) was a Texas politician who won election to the United States House of Representatives 21 times, serving 41 years.

== Early life and education ==
William Robert "Bob" Poage was born in Waco, Texas to William Allen and Helen Wheeler (Née Conger) and was raised near Woodson. He attended the schools of Throckmorton County, and during World War I served as an apprentice seaman in the United States Navy. He attended the University of Texas at Austin and the University of Colorado Boulder before receiving a Bachelor of Arts degree from Baylor University in 1921. He farmed and taught geology at Baylor before attending Baylor Law School, from which he received his LL.B. in 1924. Poage practiced law in Waco and taught at Baylor Law.

== Political career ==
A Democrat, he served in the Texas House of Representatives from 1925 to 1929, and the Texas State Senate from 1931 to 1937.

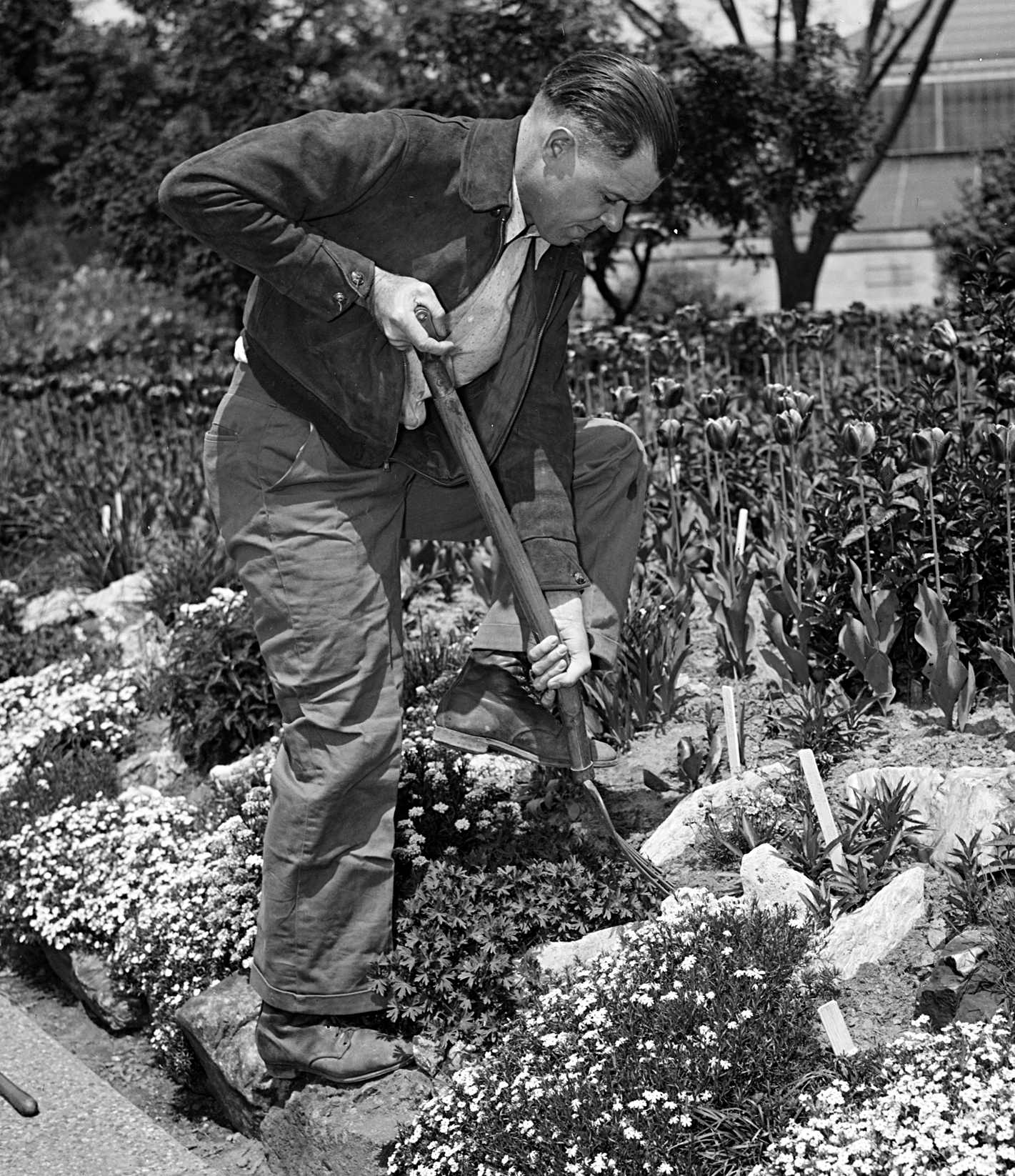
Poage working the ground in the Botanical Center of Washington, DC on May 6, 1937.

In 1936, Poage was elected to the House of Representatives. He was later diagnosed with Ménière's disease, which eventually left him deaf in one ear. In the House, he supported acts designed to help the rural residents of his district, including the farm price supports of the Roosevelt Administration. He sponsored the Humane Slaughter Act of 1958 and authored legislation that eventually became the Animal Welfare Act of 1966.

Poage was the chairman of the Committee on Agriculture from 1967 to 1975, until he was removed from his position in a revolt by House Democratic Caucus against the seniority system. The Caucus considered Poage to be too conservative and he was replaced by Tom Foley (D-WA), a future Speaker of the House.

He was one of the majority of the Texan delegation to decline to sign the 1956 Southern Manifesto opposing the desegregation of public schools ordered by the Supreme Court in Brown v. Board of Education. However, Poage voted against the Civil Rights Acts of 1957, the Civil Rights Acts of 1960, the Civil Rights Acts of 1964, and the Civil Rights Acts of 1968, as well as the 24th Amendment to the U.S. Constitution and the Voting Rights Act of 1965. And, when lobbied by the Johnson administration to support the War on Poverty legislation for the opportunities and services it would provide, Poage responded, "Oh, I see! You're talkin' about the niggers!"

== Retirement and death ==
Poage did not run for re-election in 1978 and retired on December 31, 1978, 4 days before the official end of his 21st term in office. He returned to his home in Waco, Texas. The following year the W. R. Poage Legislative Library for Graduate Studies and Research was dedicated on the Baylor University Campus to house Poage's congressional papers and the papers of eight other former U. S. Congressmen. On January 3, 1987, he died of heart failure at 87 years old after receiving open heart surgery.

== Works ==
- Poage, William R. (1985). My First 85 Years. Waco, TX: Baylor University. OCLC 13842126.

Texas House of Representatives
Preceded by Tom Shires	Member of the Texas House of Representatives from District 97-2 (Waco); 1925–1929	Succeeded by Frank Baldwin
Texas Senate
Preceded by Edgar E. Witt	Texas State Senator from District 13 (Waco); 1931–1937	Succeeded by William R. Newton, Sr.
U.S. House of Representatives
Preceded by Oliver H. Cross	Member of the U.S. House of Representatives from Texas's 11th congressional district 1937–1978	Succeeded by Marvin Leath
Political offices
Preceded by Harold D. Cooley	Chairman of the House Agriculture Committee; 1967–1975	Succeeded by Tom Foley
