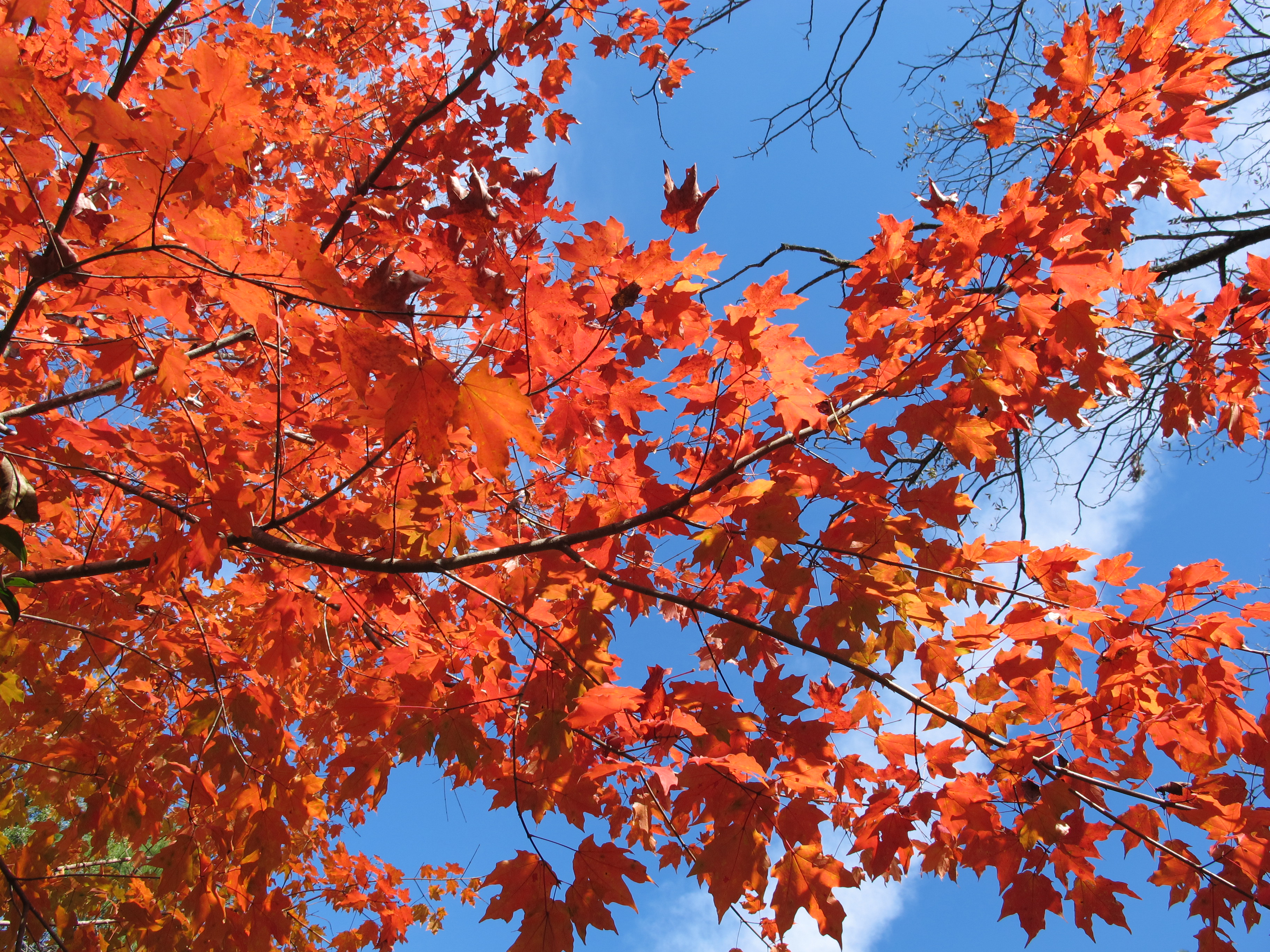

Conservation status
- Least Concern (IUCN 3.1)

Scientific classification
- Kingdom: Plantae
- Clade: Tracheophytes
- Clade: Angiosperms
- Clade: Eudicots
- Clade: Rosids
- Order: Sapindales
- Family: Sapindaceae
- Genus: Acer
- Section: Acer sect. Acer
- Series: Acer ser. Saccharodendron
- Species: A. leucoderme

Binomial name
- Acer leucoderme Small
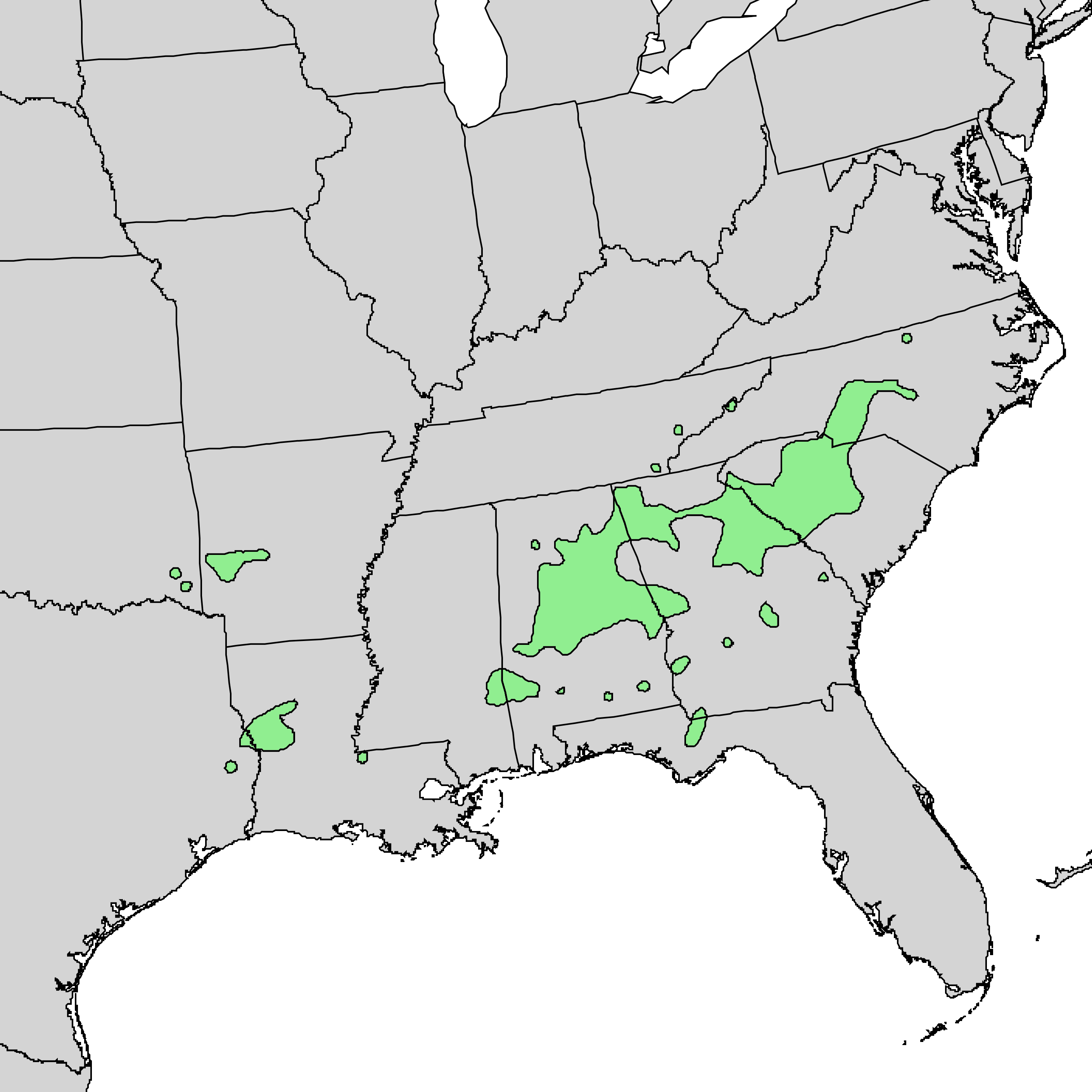
- Natural range

= Acer leucoderme =

Chalk maple

Species of maple

Acer leucoderme, the chalk maple, whitebark maple, or pale-bark maple) is a deciduous tree native to the southeastern United States from North Carolina south to northwest Florida and west to eastern Texas. It lives in the understory in moist, rocky soils on river banks, ravines, woods, and cliffs. Although generally an uncommon tree, it is most often found in the inner coastal plain and Piedmont regions of Georgia.

== Description ==
Chalk maple is a small tree, reaching 8–9 m in height and develops a round form with slender branches, and often with multiple trunks. The name "chalk maple" (in addition to the Latin name, meaning "white skin") comes from the attractive smooth and thin chalky white or light gray bark on mature trees. The bark becomes ridged and blackish at the base as it ages. The leaves are opposite and simple, 5–9 cm long and broad, often drooping at the tip. They have 5 or 3 long-pointed lobes with wavy or coarsely toothed edges. They are dark green and hairless above, with a yellow-green and softly pubescent underside. In autumn, the leaves turn from a brilliant yellow to orange to deep red. The fruit is a paired brown samara, 2-2.5 cm long, maturing in autumn.

Acer leucoderme is often confused with Acer floridanum (Florida maple), but there are several differences. A. leucoderme is smaller in size but has larger leaves than Florida maple. The leaves of A. leucoderme are yellow-green underneath rather than the whitish underside of Florida maple. The lobes on the leaves of Florida maple are squarer and blunter than those of A. leucoderme.

Some botanists classify A. leucoderme as a subspecies of the sugar maple: A. saccharum subsp. leucoderme

== Taxonomy ==
John Kunkel Small first recognized Acer leucoderme as a distinct species in 1895, observing it along the Yadkin River in Stanly County, North Carolina and the Yellow River in Gwinnett County, Georgia. Acer leucoderme has been combined with Acer saccharum and variously recognized as distinct species or variety over time. In 1897, George Bishop Sudworth described the synonym Acer saccharum var. leucoderme Sudw. for the USDA Division of Forestry. In 1914, Julius A. Nieuwland reports the synonym Saccharodendron leucoderme and Yves Desmarais described the species in 1952 as Acer saccharum subsp. leucoderme (Small) Desmarais. Francis Raymond Fosberg used the synonym Acer nigrum var. leucoderme (Small) Fosberg.

== Distribution and habitat ==
Acer leucoderme can be found from North Carolina south into Florida and west to Texas. Acer leucoderme is an understory tree that is capable of surviving in poor soil conditions and grows on cliffs, along the banks of rivers, and in ravines. Though a relatively uncommon species, the IUCN Red List categorized A. leucoderme as Least Concern with a stable population.

== Cultivation ==
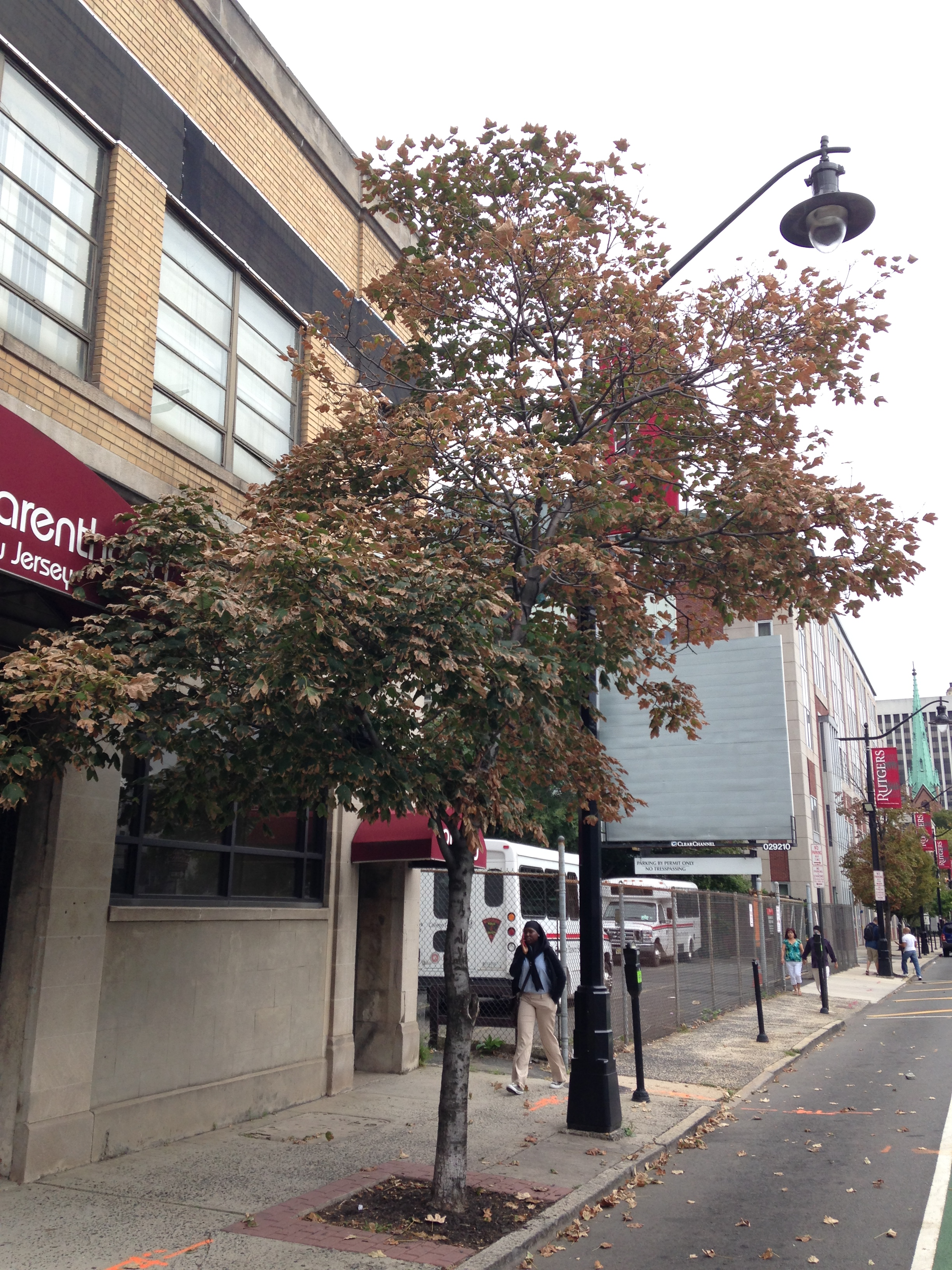
Acer leucoderme in an urban environment.

Acer leucoderme is well-suited for the warmer and drier climates of the upland regions of the southeastern United States. Because A. leucoderme does not require rich soil in which to grow, it can be a viable option for planting in urban environments. Acer leucoderme can be grown as a shade tree or reclamation plant up through USDA plant hardiness zone 5B, far north of its natural range. The tree is highly shade- and drought-tolerant. It is recommended that seeds be gathered while still on the tree, as they do not stay viable for very long and are susceptible to insect damage.

== Differentiation from Florida maple ==
A member of the Sapindaceae family, Acer leucoderme can be most easily differentiated from its closest cousin, Acer floridanum (Florida maple or Southern sugar maple), by its leaves and size. The leaves of the chalk maple are generally smaller, 5-8 cm across, with 3 to 5 lobes, whereas the leaves of the Florida maple are larger, up to 11 cm. The leaves of A. leucoderme are yellow-green underneath rather than the whitish underside of Florida maple. The lobes on the leaves of Florida maple are squarer and blunter than those of A. leucoderme. The chalk maple grows up to 9 m in height, though often appears with a more shrub-like presentation, whereas the Florida maple grows from 15 to 25 m Both varieties share similar gray and white bark, though A. floridanum bark tends to curl up more around the edges. Both provide a bright orange to red leaf display in the fall. Both trees retain their dry leaves in winter.

== Uses ==
Acer leucoderme is primarily used as an ornamental tree, though it has been used as a minor timber tree.

== Threats ==
The International Union for Conservation of Nature (IUCN) Red List of Threatened Species describes no active threats to Acer leucoderme; however, both invasive species and climate change may cause problems in the future. Acer species are often host to the Asian long-horned beetle, which could become a problem if its range extends south. Climate change is projected to cause a significant decline in suitable habitat for A. leucoderme. Although it is not in danger now, it is estimated that more than 90% of this species' habitat will be unsuitable by 2050.
