= I. D. Fairchild =

American politician (1875–1928)

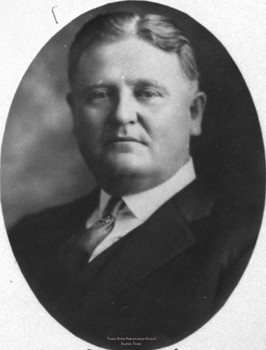

Member of the Texas Senate
- In office January 13, 1925 – May 1, 1928
- Preceded by: Henry Lewis Darwin
- Succeeded by: William E. Thomason
- Constituency: 3rd district
- In office January 11, 1921 – January 13, 1925
- Preceded by: Edgar Earnest Witt
- Succeeded by: William Robert Poage
- Constituency: 13th district
President pro tempore
President pro tempore of the Texas Senate
In office June 14, 1923 – January 13, 1925
Preceded by	H. L. Lewis
Succeeded by	Alvin J. Wirtz

Member of the Texas House of Representatives from the 10th district
- In office April 30, 1915 – January 11, 1921
- Preceded by: Benjamin Alfred Calhoun
- Succeeded by: John Wesley Laird

Personal details
- Born: December 31, 1875 Burke, Texas, U.S.
- Died: May 1, 1928 (aged 52) Dallas, Texas, U.S.
- Resting place: Ryan Chapel Cemetery, Diboll, Texas, U.S.
- Party: Democratic
- Spouse: Marguerite Gibson Shearer (m. 1906)

I. D. Fairchild (December 31, 1875 — May 1, 1928) was a Texas lawyer and businessman who served in the Texas House of Representatives and the Texas Senate. Fairchild died in a motor vehicle accident during his tenure.

== Background and death ==
I. D. Fairchild was born on December 31, 1875, in Burke, Texas to James Monroe and Florida Ann Hardin Fairchild; he had six siblings. Fairchild was a lawyer in Lufkin, Texas, and married Marguerite Gibson Shearer on August 8, 1906. During his time as a state legislator, Fairchild was a resident of Lufkin; however, he and his wife spent much of their time in Austin, Texas. Marguerite Fairchild was very active in the Lufkin community, and served on the County Board of Child Welfare and the Chamber of Commerce of Angelina County, Texas. She also started the first library in Lufkin. The Fairchild's supported governors James E. Ferguson and Miriam A. Ferguson. Additionally, they were also avid supporters of the University of Texas. A businessman, Fairchild owned a sawmill near Huntington.

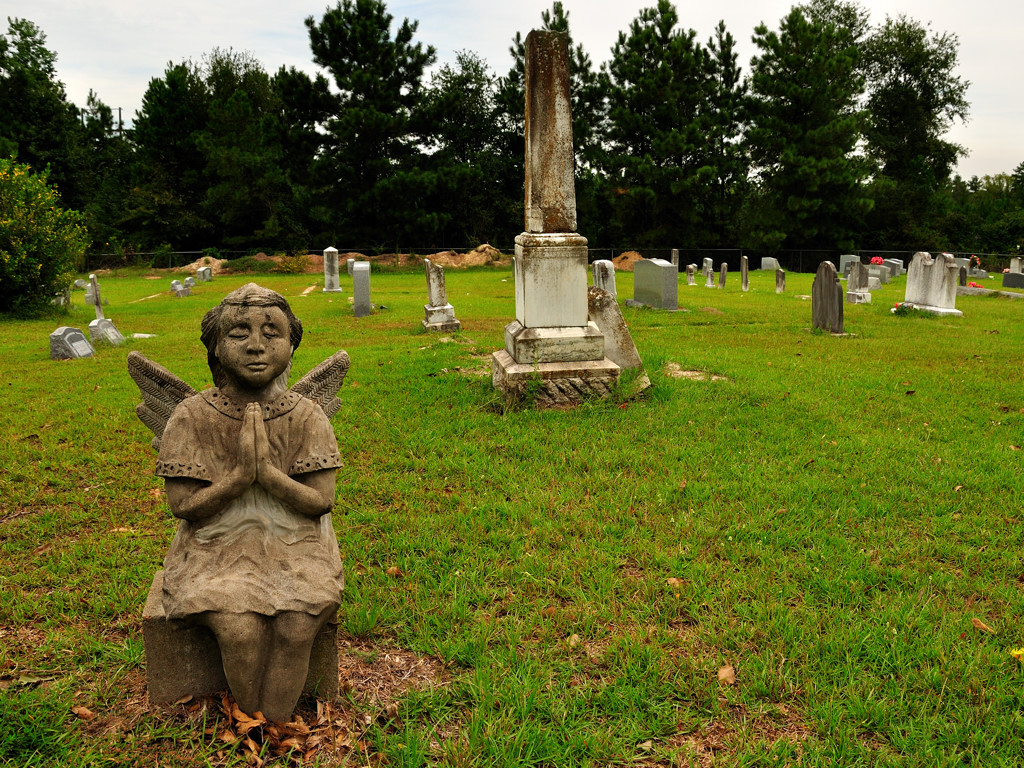
Ryan Chapel Hill Cemetery where Fairchild is buried

On April 17, 1928, in Dallas, Texas Fairchild was involved in a severe automobile accident, and died on May 1, 1928, from his injuries in a Dallas hospital at the age of 52. His funeral service was held at the First Baptist Church in Lufkin, and was officiated by Rev. A. E. Maness, Luther Anderson, and Rev. W. T. Renfro. A eulogy was given by J. A. Glenn, the division superintendent for the Santa Fe Railway, at the service. His final resting place is Ryan Chapel Cemetery in Diboll, Texas.

In the 1950s, Marguerite owned a farm east of the Angelina County Airport that she likely inherited from Fairchild. On January 18, 1974, Marguerite died and she is buried at Garden of Memories Cemetery in Lufkin.

== Political career ==
Fairchild started off his tenure in the Texas Legislature by representing district 10 of the Texas House of Representatives, which at the time was composed of Angelina County and San Augustine County. He was sworn in on April 30, 1915, succeeding Benjamin Alfred Calhoun. He continued to serve district 10 of the Texas House of Representatives until January 11, 1921, when he was succeeded by John Wesley Laird. Fairchild then began serving in the Texas Senate. First, he was sworn to represent to serve district 13 of the Texas Senate on January 11, 1921, succeeding Edgar Earnest Witt, and continued to serve district 13 until January 13, 1925, when he was succeeded by William Robert Poage. During part of the 38th legislature, he was president pro tempore of the Texas Senate. Due to redistricting, he was sworn in on January 13, 1925, to represent district 3 of the Texas Senate succeeding Henry Lewis Darwin. He served district 3 until his death on May 1, 1928, and was later succeeded by William E. Thomason. Throughout his career Fairchild was affiliated with the Democratic Party.

=== Legacy ===
I. D. Fairchild State Forest is a state forest located along U.S. Highway 84 in Rusk County, Texas. The park is 2,896 acres.
