= William E. Thomason =

American politician

Member of the Texas Senate from the 3rd district
- In office January 8, 1929 – January 10, 1933
- Preceded by: I. D. Fairchild
- Succeeded by: John S. Redditt
President pro tempore
President pro tempore of the Texas Senate
In office January 8, 1931 – October 3, 1931
Preceded by	C. C. Small
Succeeded by	J.W. Stevenson

Member of the Texas House of Representatives from the 7th district
- In office January 9, 1917 – January 9, 1923
- Preceded by: A. Russel
- Succeeded by: William Scott Crawford

Personal details
- Born: William Edgar Thomason; July 13, 1872
- Died: April 13, 1938 (aged 65)
- Party: Democratic

William Edgar Thomason (July 13, 1872 — April 13, 1938) was a Texas politician who served in the Texas House of Representatives and the Texas Senate. Thomason was affiliated with the Democratic Party.

== Personal life ==
William Edgar Thomason was born in 1872, and died on April 13, 1938.

== Political career ==
Thomason was sworn in on January 9, 1917 to represent district 7 of the Texas House of Representatives succeeding A. Russel. At the time, district 3 was composed of Nacogdoches County, Texas. He continued to represent House District 7 until he left off on January 9, 1923 being succeeded by William Scott Crawford. On January 8, 1929, Thomason was sworn into represent district 3 of the Texas Senate succeeding I.D. Fairchild. The district was composed of Angelina County, Cherokee County, Jasper County, Nacogdoches County, Newton County, Sabine County, San Augustine County, and Tyler County. During part of the 42nd Texas legislature, Thomason served as Texas Senate president pro tempore. He exited office on January 10, 1933 being succeeded by John S. Redditt. Throughout his tenure, Thomason was affiliated with the Democratic Party.
