= John Henry Kirby State Forest =

Protected area in Texas, United States

John Kirby State Forest
- Location within Texas
- Location: Tyler County, Texas, USA
- Nearest city: Woodville, Kountze, Beaumont
- Coordinates: 30°34′36″N 94°24′38″W
- Area: 626 acres (253 ha)
- Established: 1929
- Website: Official website

The John Henry Kirby State Forest is a 626-acre (2.5 km^{2}) forest reserve located in Tyler County, Texas. Located just fourteen miles (23 km) south of Woodville and seventeen miles north of Kountze, it is used primarily for research by Texas A&M University. It is open to the public for picnics and touring only. The 6.6 mile Longleaf Nature Trail is located within the state forest. Any revenue generated is donated to student-loan programs at Texas A&M. The land was donated to the state by the lumber baron John Henry Kirby in 1929.

In the 1930s, the Civilian Conservation Corps planted trees, improved timber stands and constructed a residence, fire lookout tower, roads, fire breaks and bridges.

== See also ==
- Texas Forest Trail
- List of Texas state forests
- List of botanical gardens and arboretums in the United States
