= Brighteye darter =

Conservation status
- Least Concern (IUCN 3.1)

Scientific classification
- Kingdom: Animalia
- Phylum: Chordata
- Class: Actinopterygii
- Order: Perciformes
- Family: Percidae
- Genus: Etheostoma
- Species: E. lynceum

Binomial name
- Etheostoma lynceum O. P. Hay, 1885

Species of fish

The brighteye darter (Etheostoma lynceum) is a species of freshwater ray-finned fish, a darter from the subfamily Etheostomatinae, part of the family Percidae, which also contains the perches, ruffes and pikeperches. It is endemic to the eastern United States. The brighteye darter was first described by Oliver Perry Hay in 1885. He noted it is closely related to the banded darter (E. zonale). Until the 1970s, the brighteye darter was generally believed to be a genetic variation of the banded darter.

== Distribution ==
The brighteye darter inhabits the lower, benthopelagic areas of freshwater streams and rivers. The brighteye darter is distributed in eastern tributaries of the Mississippi River from Louisiana north to western Tennessee and eastward along the Gulf Coast to the Escatawpa River system in Mobile County. It can also be found in the former Mississippi embayment in the western part of Kentucky, and in coastal drainages from the Escatawpa River in Alabama to the Mississippi River in Louisiana. Rechannelization may have extirpated them from some of their natural ranges into Alabama, but brighteye darters have been able to find more suitable streams as they travel up the Mississippi River system.

== Ecology ==
The brighteye darter feeds primarily on invertebrates, mainly flies in the family Chironomidae. The larval stages of these flies are an important component of the bottom of the aquatic ecosystem in which the brighteye darter resides. The darter will watch for the larval stage to erupt from its egg casing and eat it before it has time to swim off. These flies hatch year-round and make up 75–80% of the darters' diets. In comparison to other darters to which the brighteye is related, it does not change food source from season to season. Other darters, such as the blackbanded darter (Percina nigrofasciata), can change their diets with every season, thus having much more diverse diets.

The brighteye darter prefers clear, fast-flowing water, with gravel riffles. This type of habitat can be found in several places around the Mississippi River Basin.

== Lifecycle ==
The brighteye reproduces from late February to May. The bright male coloring emerges then, as well as female maturity. The algae forming on the rocks of the streams makes a great adhesive area for the eggs of the female to attach. The clutch size and mass increases significantly in the spawning season, unlike the size of the egg. Ovulated eggs can be 1.2–1.5 millimeters (0.047–0.059 in) in size. After the darter hatches, growth is quick, and it reaches a maximum length of 6.5 centimeters (2.6 in). It takes the brighteye an average of one year for it to grow to maturity and be able to reproduce.

== Taxonomy and etymology ==
The brighteye darter was first formally described in 1885 by the American ichthyologist Oliver Perry Hay (1846–1939) with the type locality given as a shallow rocky branch of the Chickasawha River at Enterprise, Clarke County, Mississippi. The specific name lynceum refers to Lynceus of Messenia, one of the Argonauts who took part in a mythical voyage on board the Argo with Jason. Lynceus was known for his acute vision.

== Management ==
Currently, no management plan is in place for the brighteye darter, mainly due to its ability to react to environmental stressors easily and its widespread distribution. It is also placed on the "Least Concern" list of the federally endangered species of United States. The brighteye darter is protected in the states where it is found, especially in Mississippi.
