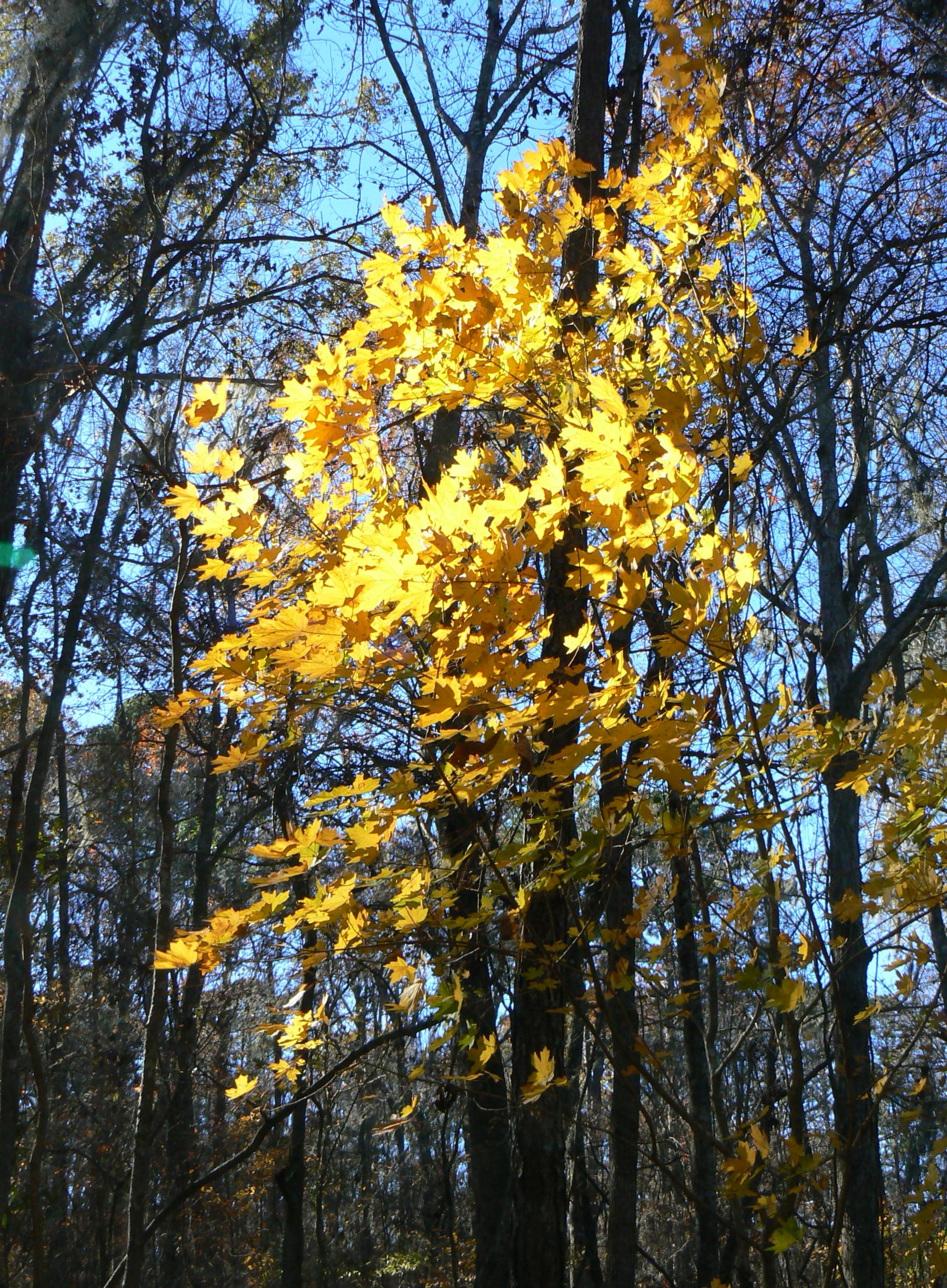
- Young A. floridanum, about 4 m tall, showing color change.

Conservation status
- Apparently Secure (NatureServe)

- Least Concern (IUCN 3.1)

Scientific classification
- Kingdom: Plantae
- Clade: Tracheophytes
- Clade: Angiosperms
- Clade: Eudicots
- Clade: Rosids
- Order: Sapindales
- Family: Sapindaceae
- Genus: Acer
- Section: Acer sect. Acer
- Series: Acer ser. Saccharodendron
- Species: A. floridanum

Binomial name
- Acer floridanum (Chapm.) Pax
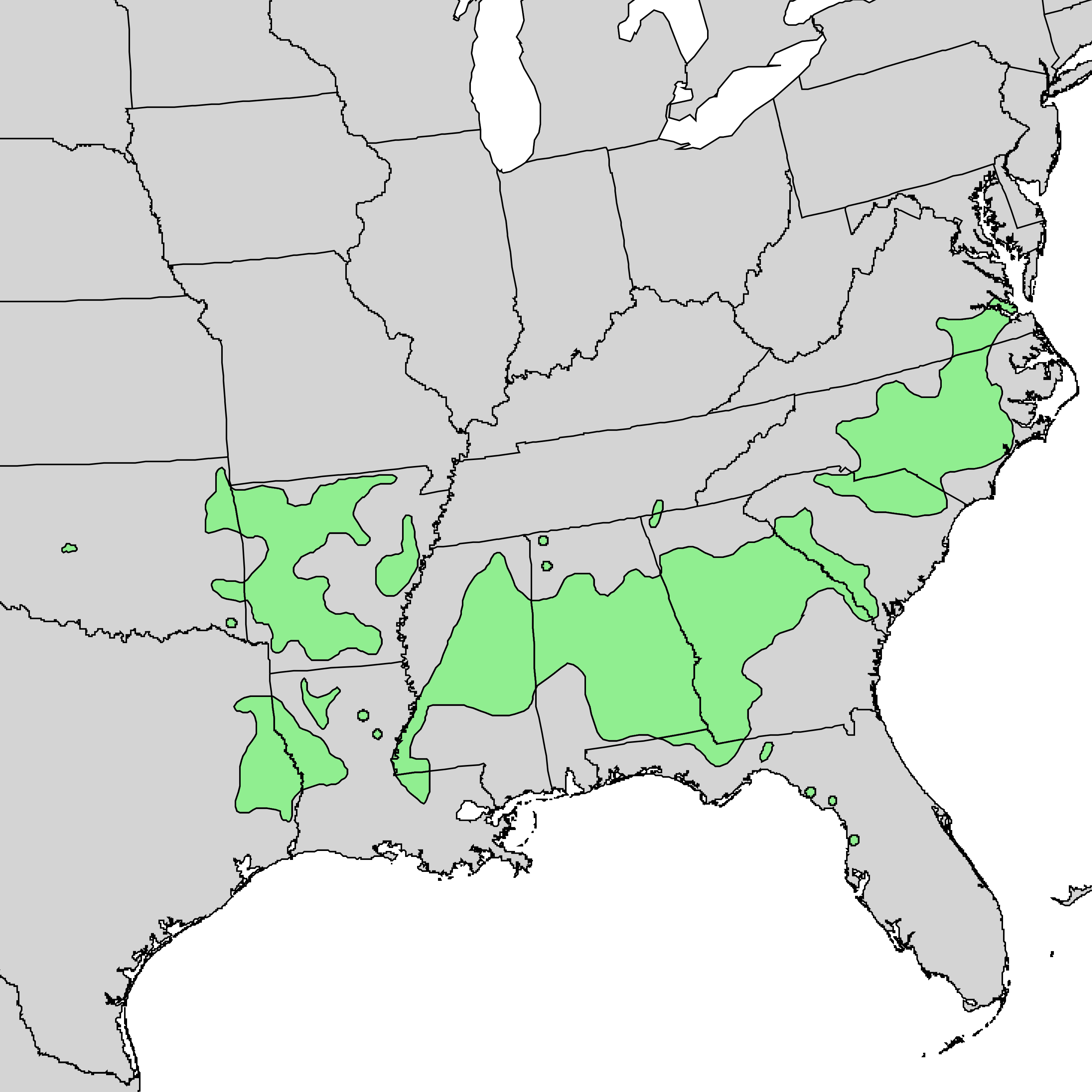
- Distribution

= Acer floridanum =

Species of maple

Acer floridanum (syn. Acer saccharum subsp. floridanum (Chapm.) Desmarais, Acer barbatum auct. non Michx.), commonly known as the Florida maple and occasionally as the southern sugar maple or hammock maple, is a tree that occurs in mesic and usually calcareous woodlands of the Atlantic and Gulf coastal plain in the United States, from southeastern Virginia in the north, south to central Florida, and west to Oklahoma and Texas and also common in south Illinois and Missouri

== Description ==
It is a medium-sized to large deciduous tree, growing to 15–25 m tall—exceptionally to 38 m—with an elliptical crown of moderate density with a smooth or rounded outline. The bark is a light gray with thick irregular curling ridges; as the tree matures, the bark tends to become plated. The twigs are slender, somewhat shiny, reddish brown. The terminal buds are sharply pointed, brown and pubescent. The leaves are opposite, simple, palmately lobed and veined, 3–9.5 cm long and 3.5–11 cm broad, with an entire margin and three or five somewhat rounded lobes, and a 2–8 cm long petiole. They are green above and paler and pubescent below. In fall they turn orange and yellow. The flowers are regular, pentamerous, and appear on yellow-green corymbs and are quite small. They hang from puberulent pedicels 2.4–5 cm long in clusters of a few flowers, appearing before or with the leaves in early spring. This is about two weeks prior to the maturation of the flowers of Acer saccharum. The tree is generally diecious, though they are often also polygamous, that is having bisexual and unisexual flowers on the same individual. The fruit is a paired samara 1.5–3 cm long.

Acer floridanum can easily be confused in the field with the closely related Acer leucoderme and Acer saccharum. It can be best distinguished from A. saccharum by noting the smaller leaves with short and acute lobes, the smaller samaras, and the more whitish bark. Several overlaps in genetics between these two species have been found in east Texas and in the zone from Maryland south to northern Florida, despite the fact that Maryland is listed as beyond the natural range of the tree. In light of this information, it can be assumed that the two hybridize. From A. leucoderme, it is best told by the white hairs on the undersides of the leaves, yellow-haired in A. leucoderme.

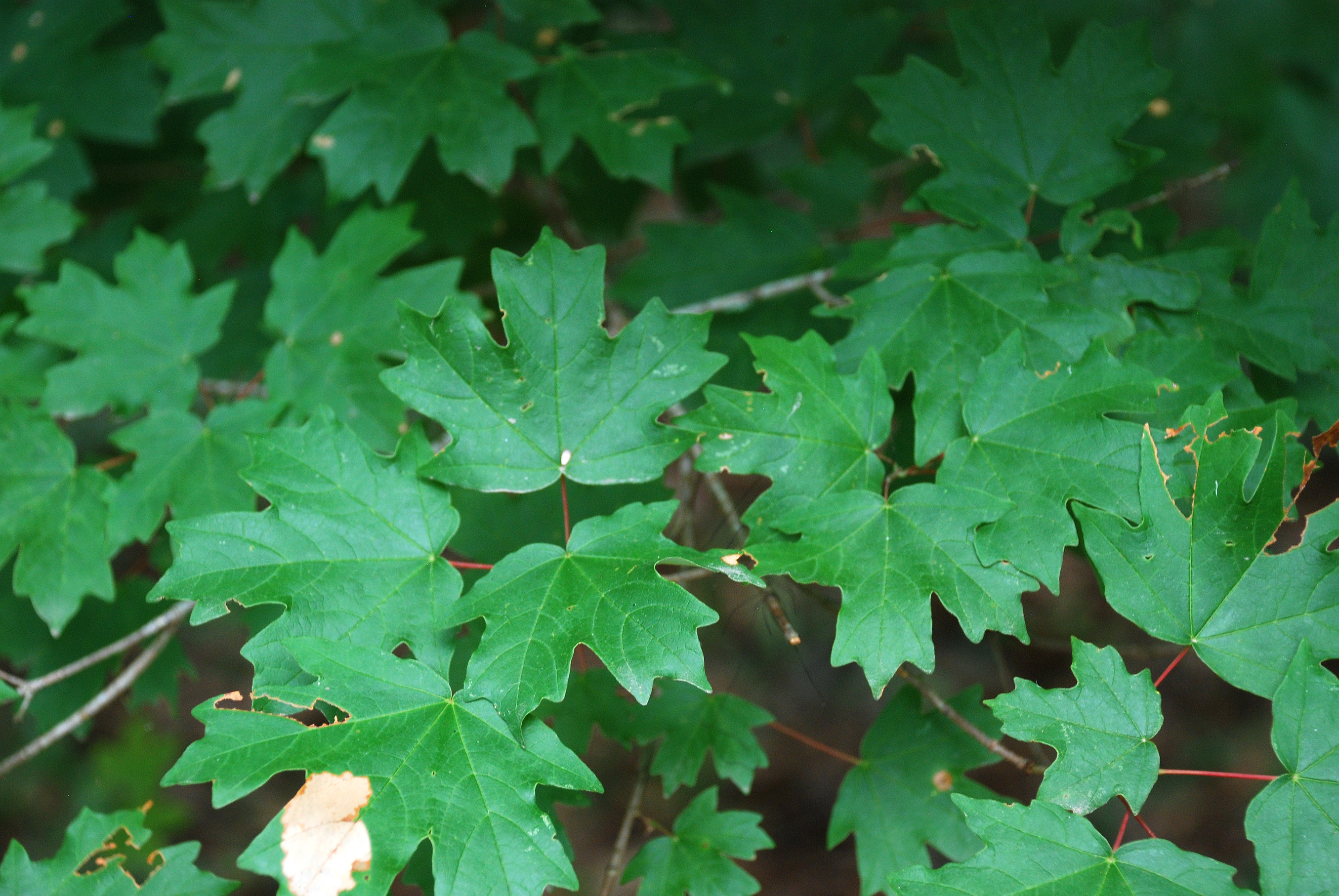
Branches

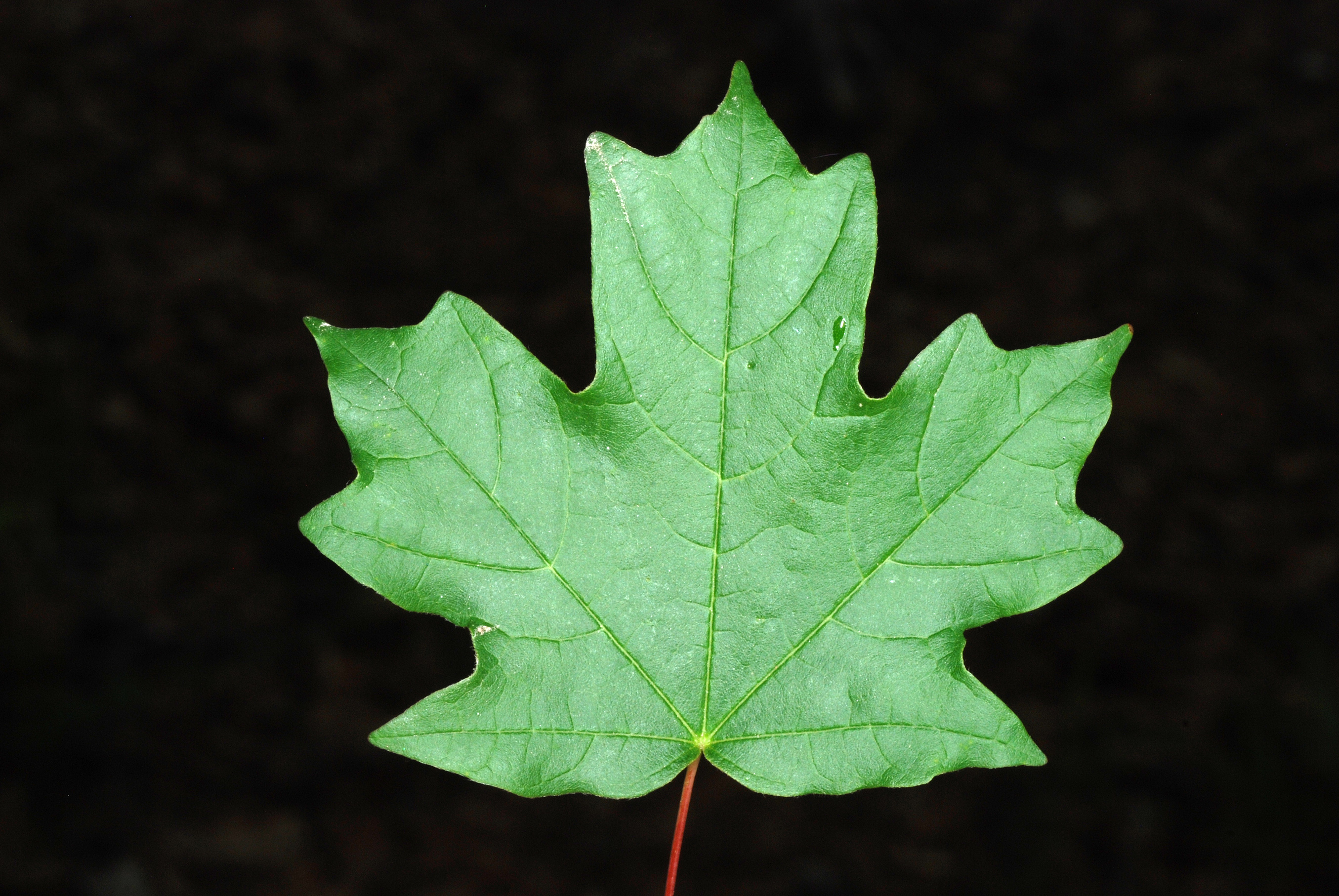
leaf

== Taxonomy ==
Debate still exists about its taxonomic status, which has been controversial for at least 100 years.

The Florida maple was first recognised as distinct in 1860 by Alvan Wentworth Chapman, who treated it as a variety of A. saccharum. In 1886 Ferdinand Albin Pax decided it was distinct enough to be treated as a separate species, making the new combination A. floridanum (Chapm.) Pax. In 1952, Yves Desmarais took an intermediate option, treating it as a subspecies Acer saccharum subsp. floridanum (Chapm.) Desmarais, a treatment which has fairly wide recent recognition.

A further problem exists with the specific name Acer barbatum, given to a maple by André Michaux in 1803 from samples collected in the Carolinas during his decade in North America from 1785 to 1796. For a long time it was unclear if the plant he collected was Acer saccharum (sugar maple) or A. floridanum, as his samples were badly damaged on his return to Paris. M. L. Fernald reexamined the species in the mid-1940s for the 8th edition of Gray's Manual, published in 1950; on reviewing Michaux's notes on A. barbatum, he decided to apply this name to the Florida maple in 1945, based on his interpretation that Michaux's samples, which he only knew through notes (Michaux's collections were in Paris, inaccessible as World War II had not yet ended), corresponded more closely to Florida maple than to sugar maple. Since the oldest given name takes precedence, he used the name A. barbatum for the Florida maple. Many subsequent authors accepted this judgement, such as the United States Forest Service, and Wilbur H. Duncan and Marion Duncan's Trees of the Southeastern United States, published in 1988. In 2004, examination by D. B. Ward showed that they are typical Acer saccharum after all, and not A. floridanum as Fernald had thought without examination, and thus Michaux's name is correctly a synonym of A. saccharum.

== Distribution and ecology ==
The distribution is discontinuous in the Piedmont and Atlantic Coastal Plain from southeastern Virginia southwest across North Carolina, South Carolina and Georgia, as well as into the Florida Panhandle. The range goes farther west across Alabama, Mississippi, Louisiana, into eastern Texas, and north through Arkansas and into eastern Oklahoma. The species also occurs in several isolated locations roughly halfway down the Gulf Coast of the Florida peninsula, and also in at least one location in central Oklahoma. The species is also found in isolated locations of Illinois, Missouri, Tennessee and Kentucky.

The average annual rainfall within the native area ranges from 112 to 163 cm (44 to 64 in). The driest months average no less than 50 mm (2.0 in). The normal temperatures in January within the range vary from 11 to 18 °C (52 to 64 °F) maximum, and from −2 to 7 °C (28 to 45 °F) minimum, whereas in July normal maxima are 29 to 33 °C (84 to 91 °F), and minima are 21 to 24 °C (70 to 75 °F). The tree favours moist, but well-drained fertile soils, especially on stream terrace, in coves, and on adjacent bluffs and ridgetops. It grows best on soils containing calcareous material such as limestone or marl. It also grows well on the densely forested hammocks of Florida, hence its alternative common name hammock maple. It is most often confined to the understory.

== Cultivation and uses ==
While not an overwhelmingly popular tree in cultivation, it is sometimes employed in the Southern United States as a shade tree due to its round crown and its greater resistance to heat than that of its more showy relative the sugar maple. Several species of birds and especially squirrels make use of the tree as a nesting site and also consume its seeds as a food source.

Despite the fact that of itself Florida maple is not employed as a commercial timber species, it is used with associated commercial species when the products are pulpwood, sawtimber, or wood veneer stock. It is considered a hard maple and as high quality individuals are suitable for producing furniture, flooring, paneling, and shoe lasts. However, its relative scarcity, small size, and fairly poor shape generally confine its use to only factory and box lumber, and even this is only an occasional occurrence. It has, however, been experiencing growing popularity as an ornamental or shade tree, especially in the Southern United States due to its high heat resistance. It is also a source of maple syrup, though again its size and rarity limit its use in this regard, especially in light of the sugar maple's established popularity within the business.
