= E.O. Siecke State Forest =

Protected area in Texas, United States

Coordinates: 30.637°N 93.823°W

The E.O. Siecke State Forest is a Texas state forest near Kirbyville, Texas. Managed by the Texas A&M Forest Service, the 1,722-acre forest reserve was the first in the state, and is managed for wildlife habitat, outdoor recreation and research into sustainable forestry and forest health practices.

On November 8, 2011, an EF1 tornado tore through the southern part of the forest along FM 82, snapping hundreds of pine trees along its path.
