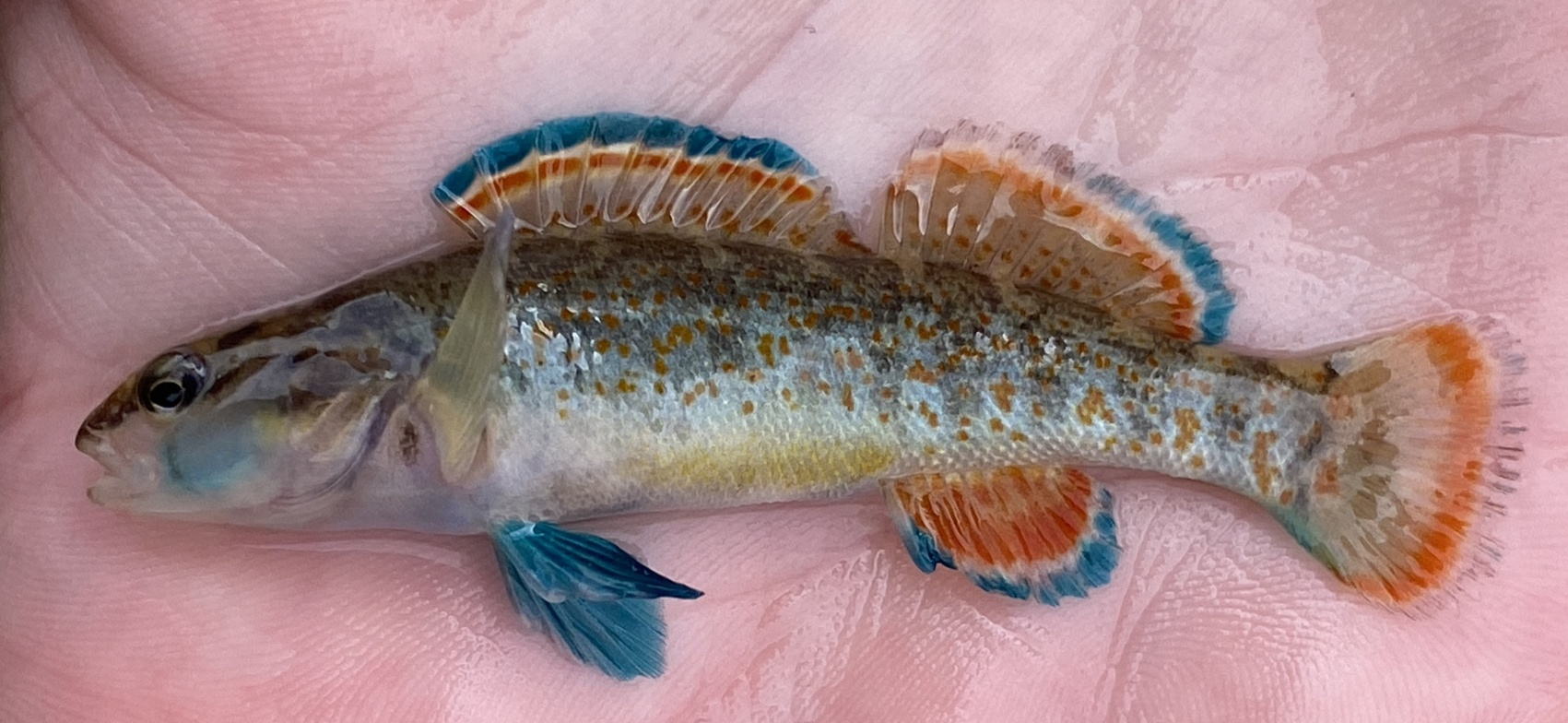
- In Arkansas

Conservation status
- Least Concern (IUCN 3.1)

Scientific classification
- Kingdom: Animalia
- Phylum: Chordata
- Class: Actinopterygii
- Order: Perciformes
- Family: Percidae
- Genus: Etheostoma
- Species: E. artesiae

Binomial name
- Etheostoma artesiae (O. P. Hay, 1881)

Synonyms
- Poecilichthys artesiae O. P. Hay, 1881

= Redspot darter =

Species of fish

The redspot darter (Etheostoma artesiae) is a species of freshwater ray-finned fish, a darter from the subfamily Etheostomatinae, part of the family Percidae, which also contains the perches, ruffes and pikeperches. It is endemic to the United States in the Gulf Coast drainages from Texas to Alabama. This species can reach a standard length of 8 cm (3.1 in).

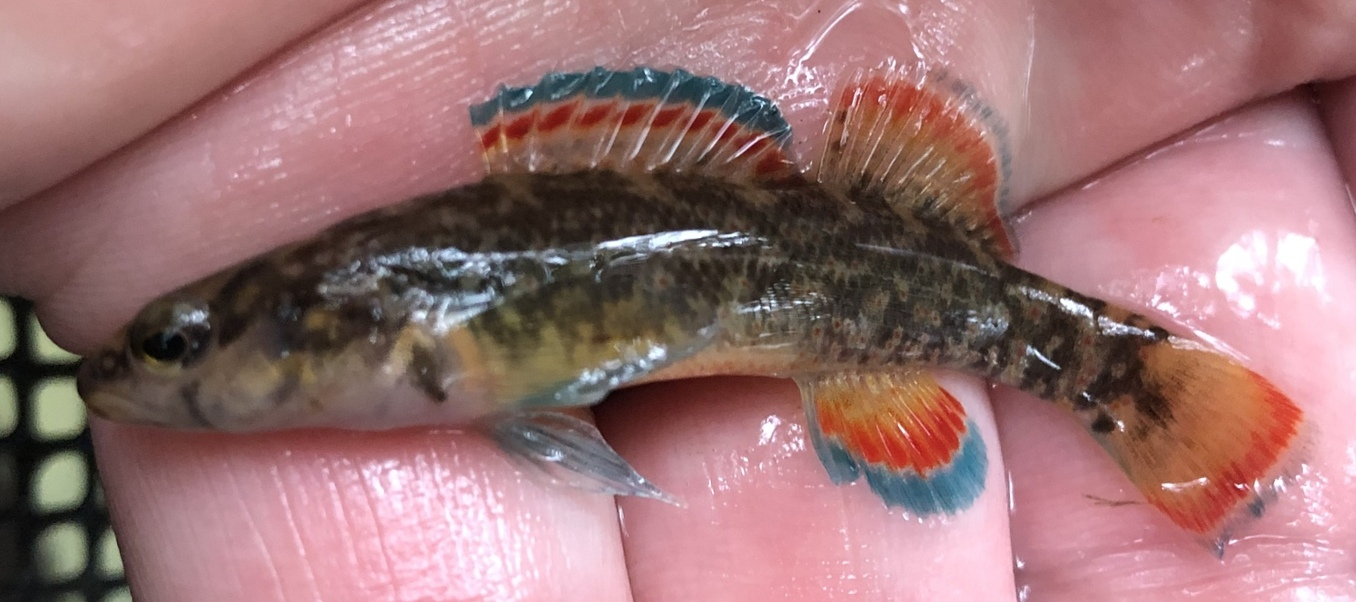
In Alabama
