= Ben Ramsey (politician) =

American politician (1903–1985)

34th Lieutenant Governor of Texas
- In office January 16, 1951 – September 18, 1961
- Governor: Allan Shivers; Price Daniel
- Preceded by: Allan Shivers
- Succeeded by: Preston Smith

Railroad Commissioner of Texas
- In office September 18, 1961 – December 31, 1976
- Governor: Price Daniel; John Connally; Preston Smith; Dolph Briscoe
- Preceded by: Olin Culberson
- Succeeded by: Jon Newton

59th Secretary of State of Texas
- In office January 19, 1949 – February 9, 1950
- Governor: Beauford Jester; Allan Shivers
- Preceded by: Paul H. Brown
- Succeeded by: John Ben Shepperd

Member of the Texas Senate from the 3rd district
- In office January 14, 1941 – January 11, 1949
- Preceded by: John S. Redditt
- Succeeded by: Ottis Elmer Lock

Member of the Texas House of Representatives from the 11th district
- In office January 13, 1931 – January 8, 1935
- Preceded by: S. R. Williams
- Succeeded by: Winter W. King

Personal details
- Born: Benjamin Turner Ramsey; December 28, 1903 San Augustine, Texas, U.S.
- Died: March 27, 1985 (aged 81) Austin, Texas, U.S.
- Resting place: Liberty Hill Cemetery, Bland Lake, Texas
- Party: Democratic
- Spouse: Florine Hankla Ramsey
- Children: 3
- Relatives: Anne Ramsey (niece)
- Education: University of Texas at Austin

Benjamin Turner Ramsey (December 28, 1903 – March 27, 1985) was an American politician who served as the 34th lieutenant governor of Texas from 1951 to 1961 and as the 59th secretary of state of Texas from 1949 to 1950. A member of the Democratic Party, Ramsey also served in both houses of the Texas Legislature and in the Railroad Commission of Texas.

== Early life and education ==
Ramsey was born on December 28, 1903, in San Augustine in San Augustine County in east Texas, the son of William Charles and Emma Jenkins Ramsey. He attended San Augustine public schools and worked on the family farm. After finishing high school, he worked three years in his father's law and abstract office, then enrolled at the University of Texas at Austin. He passed the state bar examination before graduation and was licensed to practice law in 1931. Ramsey was elected to the Texas House of Representatives and served two terms. Afterward he returned to San Augustine to practice law with his brother for five years.

== Political career ==
In 1940, he was elected to the first of two four-year terms to the Texas State Senate. He became a Senate leader in anti-deficit legislation and legislation to regulate labor unions. In 1949, Governor Beauford H. Jester chose Ramsey to be Texas Secretary of State. In 1950, Ramsey resigned from the position before being elected to statewide office as Lieutenant Governor of Texas and was re-elected in 1952, 1954, 1956, 1958, and 1960 for six two-year terms. When Governor Allan Shivers's conservative branch of Texas Democrats clashed with the state's more liberal Democrats, led by U.S. Senate Majority Leader (and future U.S. President) Lyndon B. Johnson and U.S. House Speaker Samuel T. Rayburn of Texas, the two factions agreed to support Ramsey as a member of the National Democratic Committee.

In fiscal affairs, especially opposition to higher taxes, Ramsey was considered conservative. Despite this, he supported Governor Shivers in raising revenue necessary for higher teachers' pay, state hospitals, and prisons. Like Shivers, he was an enemy of labor unions. He strongly supported rural electrification, water conservation and development, paving of farm roads, and stricter laws regulation what he called "fly-by-night insurance companies." On September 18, 1961, he resigned from the lieutenant governorship in the middle of his sixth term in office, after being appointed by Governor Price Daniel to the Texas Railroad Commission. The next year, he was elected to the unexpired term and in 1964 and 1970, was re-elected to full six-year terms. He served three two-year terms as chairman. Just before his appointment to the commission, Texas was successful in achieving control over offshore oil (see Tidelands controversy), and Ramsey helped composed the rules for Texas coastal drilling. He chose not to run for re-election to a third six-year term in 1976 and retired from public office in 1977 following 26 years in statewide elected office.

== Personal life and death ==
Ramsey was married to Florine Hankla of San Augustine, and the couple had three daughters, Rita, Ann and MariBen. He died on March 27, 1985, and was buried in San Augustine.

Party political offices
| Preceded by Allan Shivers | Democratic nominee for Lieutenant Governor of Texas; 1950, 1952, 1954, 1956, 1958, 1960 | Succeeded by Preston Smith |
| Preceded by Marjorie McCorquodale | Republican nominee for Lieutenant Governor of Texas; 1952 | Vacant Title next held by Gilbert N. Harrison |
Texas House of Representatives
| Preceded by S. R. Williams | Member of the Texas House of Representatives from District 11 (San Augustine); 1931–1935 | Succeeded by Winter W. King |
Texas Senate
| Preceded by John S. Redditt | Texas State Senator from District 3 (San Augustine); 1941–1949 | Succeeded by Ottis E. Lock |
Political offices
| Preceded by Paul H. Brown | Secretary of State of Texas; 1949–1950 | Succeeded by John Ben Shepperd |
| Preceded by Allan Shivers | Lieutenant Governor of Texas; January 16, 1951 – September 18, 1961 | Succeeded by Preston Smith |
