= 1894 Texas lieutenant gubernatorial election =

- November 6, 1894
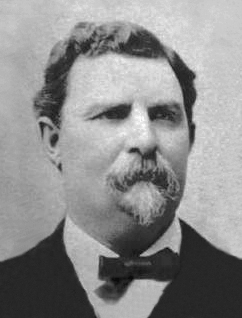

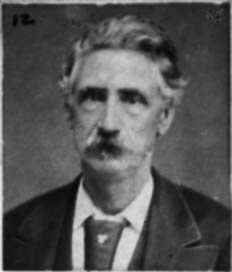

Nominee	George Taylor Jester	Francis Marion Martin	Robert Byron Rentfro
Party	Democratic	Populist	Republican
Popular vote	210,794	148,051	56,253
Percentage	49.88%	35.03%	13.31%
- County results Jester: 30–40% 40–50% 50–60% 60–70% 70–80% 80–90% >90% Martin: 30–40% 40–50% 50–60% 60–70% 70–80% Rentfro: 30–40% 40–50% 60–70% Mann: 40–50% 50–60% No data
Lieutenant Governor before election
Martin McNulty Crane
Democratic
Elected Lieutenant Governor
George Taylor Jester
Democratic

The 1894 Texas lieutenant gubernatorial election was held on November 6, 1894, in order to elect the lieutenant governor of Texas. Democratic nominee and state senator George Taylor Jester defeated former lieutenant governor Francis Marion Martin who had changed parties to run as the Populist candidate, and Republican nominee Robert Byron Rentfro.

== General election ==
At the time, Texas was a part of the "Solid South" and the Democratic party was heavily favored in state and local elections. However the administration of Jim Hogg and the election of 1892, had left a serious split in the party over how progressive they should be. A "Harmony Meeting" was held in order to unify the organization and prevent an upset by any of the opposition parties. The incumbent lieutenant governor, Martin McNulty Crane, did not seek renomination, instead he chose to run for the Attorney General's office. After a contested convention featuring several major candidates, state senator George Taylor Jester was nominated.

The state Republican party, which had split in the previous election into two rival factions over race, remained divided. The "Reform" faction, commonly known as the "Lily White" faction over their opposition to African-American membership in the party and the leadership of chairman Norris Wright Cuney, held their own convention in which they nominated W. M. Mann as their lieutenant gubernatorial nominee. The "Regular" Republicans supported a slate of candidates which featured Robert Byron Rentfro.

Though the 1892 election had been dominated by a Democratic party split, the Populists managed to secure some wins in the state legislature. Bolstered by these successes the party decided to renominate the top of their slate from the 1892 ticket and Marion Martin was again the lieutenant gubernatorial nominee.

On election day, November 6, 1894, Jester won the election by a margin of 62,743 votes against his foremost opponent Populist candidate Francis Marion Martin, retaining Democratic control over the office of lieutenant governor. Jester was sworn in as the 19th lieutenant governor of Texas on January 15, 1895.

=== Candidates ===
- Berry W. Camp, lawyer from Fort Worth (Democrat)
- Henry G. Damon, lawyer and civil war veteran from Corsicana (Prohibition)
- George Taylor Jester, state senator from Corsicana, banker, former state representative, member of 4th Texas Infantry Regiment (Democrat)
- F. S. Johnson (Democrat)(Withdrawn)
- J. G. Kirby (Democrat)(Withdrawn)
- W. M. Mann, of Dallas (Lily White Republican)
- Francis Marion Martin, former lieutenant governor, Populist candidate for lieutenant governor in 1892, fusion candidate for governor in 1888, unsuccessful candidate for the Democratic nomination for governor in 1886, delegate at the State Constitutional Convention of 1875, Captain in the CSA Cavalry (Populist)
- Robert Byron Rentfro, judge and former state representative from Brownsville (Republican)
- Samuel Crockett Upshaw, former state senator, lawyer from Hillsboro (Democrat)

=== Results ===
Texas lieutenant gubernatorial election, 1894
Party	Candidate	Votes	%	±%
Democratic	George Taylor Jester	210,794	49.88	▲6.59
Populist	Francis Marion Martin	148,051	35.03	▲10.48
Republican	Robert Byron Rentfro	56,253	13.31	N/A
Independent Republican	W. M. Mann	4,786	1.13	▲0.68
Prohibition	Henry G. Damon	2,241	0.53	▲0.13
Write-in		511	0.12	▼0.29
Total votes		422,636	100.00	
