= 1888 Texas gubernatorial election =

- November 6, 1888
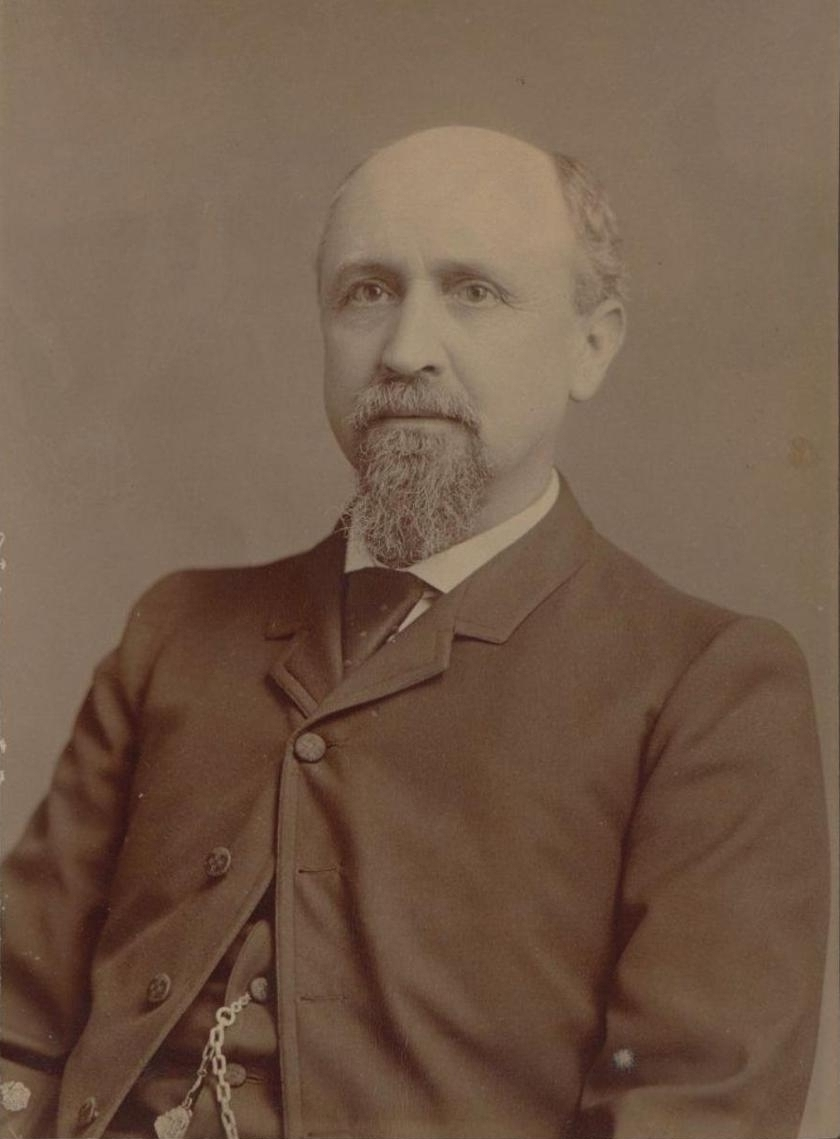

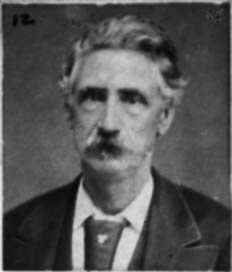
Candidate	Lawrence Sullivan Ross	Francis Marion Martin
Party	Democratic	Prohibition
Alliance		Republican; Union Labor; Non-Partisan
Popular vote	250,338	98,447
Percentage	71.77%	28.23%
- County results Ross: 50–60% 60–70% 70–80% 80–90% 90–100% Martin: 50–60% 60–70% No Results: Unorganized
Governor before election
John Ireland
Democratic
Governor-elect
Lawrence Sullivan Ross
Democratic

The 1888 Texas gubernatorial election was held to elect the Governor of Texas. Incumbent governor Lawrence Sullivan Ross was re-elected to a second term in a landslide over Francis Marion Martin, running on a fusion opposition ticket.

== General election ==
Texas at the time was a part of the "Solid South" and the Democratic party was heavily favored in state elections. Incumbent governor "Sul" Ross, had proven to be very popular given his championing of reforms regarding public land use and railroad rates. Ross had also overseen the opening of the new Texas State Capitol.

The issue of Prohibition was a major political question at the time as a statewide referendum on a state alcohol ban had failed the previous year and the Prohibition Party decided to unanimously nominate former lieutenant governor Francis Marion Martin, who had prominently campaigned in favor of prohibition. Martin had left the Democratic party after failing to secure its nomination during the 1886 gubernatorial election. Previous elections had split opposition votes between multiple smaller parties in the state including the Republican, Prohibition, and the now defunct Greenback parties. In order to attempt and consolidate the opposition votes a strategy of electoral fusion was proposed, similar to the 1882 gubernatorial campaign of independent candidate "Wash" Jones. All the opposition parties including the newly formed Union Labor Party threw their support behind Martin.

=== Candidates ===
- Lawrence Sullivan Ross, incumbent governor (Democratic)
- Francis Marion Martin, former lieutenant governor and unsuccessful candidate for the Democratic nomination for governor in 1886 (Prohibition-Fusion)

=== Results ===
1888 Texas gubernatorial election
Party	Candidate	Votes	%	±%
Democratic	Lawrence Sullivan Ross (incumbent)	250,338	71.77%	▼2.25
Prohibition	Francis Marion Martin	98,447	28.23%	▲22.11
Total votes		348,785	100.00%	
