= 1892 Texas lieutenant gubernatorial election =

- November 8, 1892
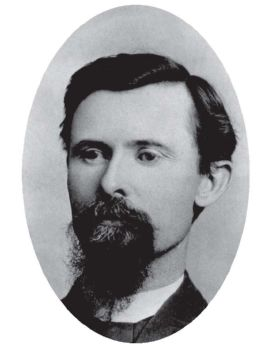

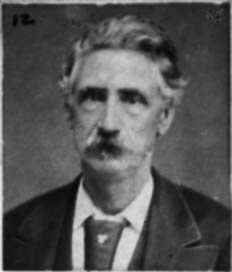
Nominee	Martin McNulty Crane	Curran M. Rogers	Francis Marion Martin
Party	Democratic	Independent Democrat	Populist
Popular vote	185,980	132,631	105,467
Percentage	43.29%	30.88%	24.55%
- County results Crane: 30–40% 40–50% 50–60% 60–70% 70–80% 80–90% Rogers: 30–40% 40–50% 50–60% 60–70% 70–80% 80–90% >90% Martin: 30–40% 40–50% 50–60% 60–70% Write-ins: 60–70% Crane-Rogers tie: 40% No data
Lieutenant Governor before election
George C. Pendleton
Democratic
Elected Lieutenant Governor
Martin McNulty Crane
Democratic

The 1892 Texas lieutenant gubernatorial election was held on November 8, 1892, in order to elect the lieutenant governor of Texas. Democratic nominee and state senator Martin McNulty Crane defeated Independent Democrat candidate Curran M. Rogers, who was aligned with George W. Clark in the concurrent gubernatorial election, and Populist nominee Francis Marion Martin.

== Background ==
Governor Jim Hogg had been elected in 1890 primarily on a platform of establishing a state Railroad Commission, which could enforce laws protecting the public against the monopolistic practices of the powerful corporate railway interests more effectively than his Attorney General office and the state legislature. The creation of the Commission and other progressive "Hogg Laws" caused a rift within the state party between supporters of Hogg and conservative Bourbon Democrats who opposed his administration. With Hogg's renomination at the state convention assured, conservatives bolted and assembled their own independent Democratic ticket.

Incumbent lieutenant governor George Pendleton chose to run for Congress in the 7th congressional district instead of running for reelection.

1892 was the first statewide election contested by the People's party (or Populists), an agrarian movement which evolved out of the Farmers' Alliance in Texas. Its electorate was a coalition of small farmers, ranchers, and laborers. It advocated left-wing reforms such as state ownership of railways, a graduated income tax, and fiat currency.

== General election ==
On election day, November 8, 1892, Democratic nominee Martin McNulty Crane won the election by a margin of 53,349 votes against his foremost opponent Independent Democrat candidate Curran M. Rogers, thereby retaining Democratic control over the office of lieutenant governor. Crane was sworn in as the 18th lieutenant governor of Texas on January 17, 1893.

=== Candidates ===
- Martin McNulty Crane, state senator from Cleburne, lawyer, former state representative, former prosecuting attorney for Johnson County (Democrat)
- Curran M. Rogers, rancher and former state representative from Banquete (Independent Democrat)
- Francis Marion Martin, former lieutenant governor, fusion candidate for governor in 1888, unsuccessful candidate for the Democratic nomination for governor in 1886, delegate at the State Constitutional Convention of 1875, Captain in the CSA Cavalry (Populist)
- James Pearson Newcomb, newspaper editor and publisher, candidate for congress in 1876, former Secretary of State of Texas (Lily White Republican)
- B. W. Williams (Prohibition)

=== Results ===
Texas lieutenant gubernatorial election, 1892
Party	Candidate	Votes	%	±%
Democratic	Martin McNulty Crane	185,980	43.29	▼33.9
Independent Democrat	C. M. Rogers	132,631	30.88	N/A
Populist	Francis Marion Martin	105,467	24.55	N/A
Independent Republican	James Pearson Newcomb	1,922	0.45	N/A
Write-in		1,863	0.43	▲0.26
Prohibition	B. W. Williams	1,703	0.40	▼0.19
Total votes		429,566	100.00	
