= John L. Haynes =

American politician (1821–1888)

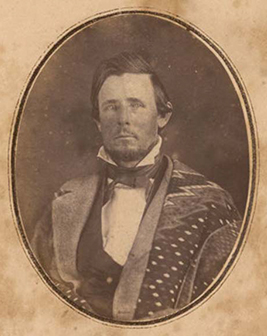

Chair of the Texas Republican Party
- In office 1867–1875
- Preceded by: Inaugural
- Succeeded by: Edmund J. Davis

Member of the Texas House of Representatives from the 67th district
- In office November 2, 1857 – February 21, 1861
- Preceded by: Anthony Banning Norton
- Succeeded by: E.D. Lane

Personal details
- Born: July 3, 1821 Bedford County, Virginia, U.S.
- Died: April 2, 1888 (aged 66) Laredo, Texas, U.S.
- Party: Republican
- Spouse: Angelica Irene Wells
- Children: 5

Military service
- Allegiance: United States (Union)
- Branch/service: U.S. Army (Union Army)
- Unit: 1st Texas Cavalry Regiment
- Battles/wars: Mexican-American War; American Civil War

John Leal Haynes (July 3, 1821 – April 2, 1888) was an American soldier and politician. Haynes was a Southern Unionist and served in the Union Army under Edmund J. Davis during the American Civil War.

== Early life ==
Haynes was born on July 3, 1821, in Bedford County, Virginia. He moved to Mississippi in the early 1840s, where he was editor of the Lexington, Mississippi, Advertiser. He volunteered for service during the Mexican-American War rising to the rank of lieutenant. He served in the Texas House of Representatives from 1857 to 1861 representing Rio Grande City in Starr County.

== American Civil War and Reconstruction ==
During the Civil War, Haynes served as an officer in Edmund J. Davis's 1st Texas Cavalry and was promoted to colonel of the 2nd Texas Cavalry in 1863. Haynes commanded the consolidated regiment which was reorganized from both the 1st and 2nd Cavalry regiments in 1864.

Following the Civil War, he lived in Austin from 1865 to 1868 where he worked as an internal revenue collector. He ran unsuccessfully for Congress in 1869. Haynes served as a collector of customs in Galveston from 1869 to 1870 and in Brownsville from 1872 to 1884. Haynes was instrumental in developing the Texas Republican Party during Reconstruction, leading the conservative faction of the party in the late 1860s and supporting the regular party in the 1870s. He ran for lieutenant governor in the 1884 Texas gubernatorial election.

== Personal life ==
Haynes was married to Angelica Irene Wells and had five children. He was a member of the Grand Army of the Republic and Freemason. He died in Laredo on April 2, 1888.
