= 1884 Texas gubernatorial election =

- November 4, 1884
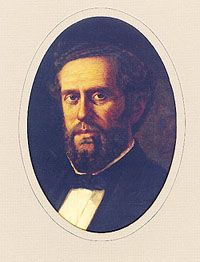

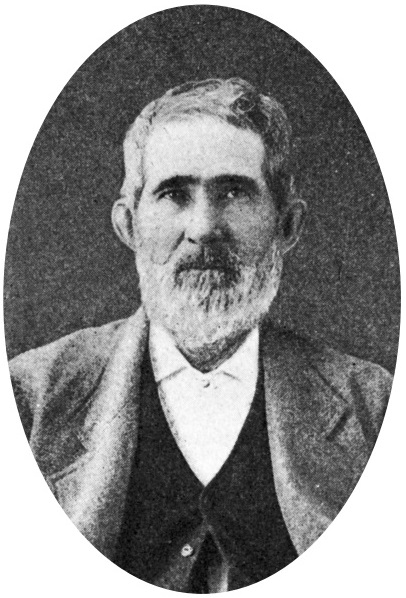

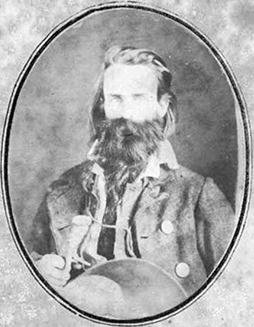
Candidate	John Ireland	George Washington Jones	Anthony Banning Norton
Party	Democratic	Independent	Republican
Alliance		Greenback
Popular vote	212,234	88,450	25,557
Percentage	65.05%	27.11%	7.83%
- County results Ireland: 40–50% 50–60% 60–70% 70–80% 80–90% 90–100% Jones: 40–50% 50–60% 60–70% 70–80% 80–90% Norton: 40–50% 50–60% 70–80% 80–90% No Data/Vote
Governor before election
John Ireland
Democratic
Governor-elect
John Ireland
Democratic

The 1884 Texas gubernatorial election was held to elect the Governor of Texas. The incumbent Democratic John Ireland was re-elected over former U.S. Representative George Washington "Wash" Jones, an independent with Greenback support, and Republican newspaper publisher Anthony Banning Norton.

== General election ==
At the time, Texas was a part of the "Solid South" and the Democratic party was overwhelmingly favored in state elections.

In the previous election, a strategy of electoral fusionism was attempted between opposition Republican and Greenback parties. Both parties endorsed the independent campaign of congressman and former lieutenant governor George Washington Jones for governor. The combined ticket only claimed 40% of the popular vote. In the 1884 cycle, Jones announced his candidacy a second time and the diminishing Greenback party continued to support him. The Republican party was split on the issue and while the majority of the group voted to support the Jones campaign, a faction advocating for their own ticket broke away and nominated Anthony B. Norton.

The incumbent lieutenant governor, Francis Marion Martin, after having disagreed with policies of the incumbent governor, John Ireland, contemplated challenging Ireland for the gubernatorial nomination instead of running for reelection, but ultimately chose to not run for any office.

=== Candidates ===
- John Ireland, incumbent Governor (Democratic)
- George Washington Jones, former U.S. Representative from Bastrop, former lieutenant governor (Independent, supported by Greenback)
- Anthony Banning Norton, newspaper publisher, former postmaster of Dallas, former United States Marshal, candidate for governor in 1878, former state representative (Republican)

=== Results ===
1884 Texas gubernatorial election
Party	Candidate	Votes	%	±%
Democratic	John Ireland (incumbent)	212,234	65.05%	▲5.59
Independent	George W. Jones	88,450	27.11%	▼13.30
Republican	A.B. Norton	25,557	7.83%	N/A
Total votes		326,241	100.00%	
