= 1878 Texas gubernatorial election =

- November 5, 1878
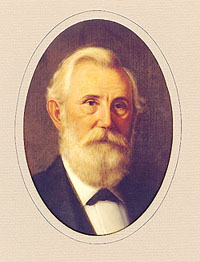

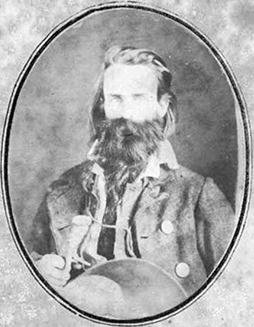
Candidate	Oran Milo Roberts	W. H. Hamman	Anthony Banning Norton
Party	Democratic	Greenback	Republican
Popular vote	158,302	55,002	23,712
Percentage	66.76%	21.20%	10.00%
- County results Roberts: 30–40% 40–50% 50–60% 60–70% 70–80% 80–90% 90–100% Hamman: 30–40% 40–50% 50–60% 60–70% Norton: 40–50% 50–60% 60–70% 80–90% Tie: 30–40% No Data/Vote
Acting Governor before election
Richard B. Hubbard
Democratic
Governor-elect
Oran Milo Roberts
Democratic

The 1878 Texas gubernatorial election was held to elect the Governor of Texas. Democratic candidate and Chief Justice of the Texas Supreme Court Oran Milo Roberts defeated Greenback William H. Hamman and Republican Anthony Banning Norton by a wide margin.

== General election ==
At the Democratic state convention in July, incumbent governor Richard B. Hubbard competed against former governor James Throckmorton and both failed to secure a nomination due to the rules of the convention. Justice Oran Roberts was selected as the compromise candidate by a conference committee.

The newly formed Greenback Party, a populist agrarian party focused on monetary issues, ran their first ticket for state offices and nominated William H. Hamman of Robertson County to be their nominee for governor.

The leadership of the state Republican Party initially contemplated supporting the Greenback ticket instead of running their own slate of candidates and splitting the opposition vote, but a convention was held in which Anthony Banning Norton of Dallas was nominated to lead a full ticket.

The national questions of protective tariffs, the monetary questions of silver and greenbacks, and immigration were the focus of the campaigns.

Following the adoption of the 1876 state constitution, Texas became a part of the "Solid South" and the Democratic party was overwhelmingly favored in state elections. On election day, November 5, 1878, Democratic candidate Oran Roberts won the election by a wide margin. He was sworn in as the 16th governor of Texas on January 21, 1879.

=== Candidates ===
- William H. Hamman, oil pioneer and former Confederate brigadier general (Greenback)
- Richard B. Hubbard, incumbent governor (Democratic) (withdrawn)
- Anthony Banning Norton, postmaster of Dallas, newspaper publisher, and former state representative (Republican)
- Oran Milo Roberts, Chief Justice of the Texas Supreme Court, president of the 1861 Secession Convention (Democratic)
- James W. Throckmorten, congressman from the 3rd district, former governor, delegate at the 1861 Secession Convention (Democratic) (withdrawn)

=== Results ===
1878 Texas gubernatorial election
Party	Candidate	Votes	%	±%
Democratic	Oran Milo Roberts	158,302	66.76%	▲8.4
Greenback	William H. Hamman	55,002	21.20%	N/A
Republican	Anthony Banning Norton	23,712	10.00%	▼14.9
Write-in		99	0.04%	▲0.04
Total votes		237,115	100.00%	
