= Leonidas Jefferson Storey =

Lieutenant Governor of Texas from 1881 to 1883

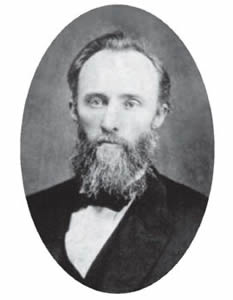

13th Lieutenant Governor of Texas
- In office January 18, 1881 – January 16, 1883
- Governor: Oran Milo Roberts
- Preceded by: Joseph D. Sayers
- Succeeded by: Francis Marion Martin

Railroad Commissioner of Texas
- In office November 21, 1894 – March 28, 1909
- Governor: Jim Hogg; Charles A. Culberson; Joseph D. Sayers; S. W. T. Lanham; Thomas Mitchell Campbell
- Preceded by: William P. McLean
- Succeeded by: William D. Williams

Member of the Texas Senate from the 31st district
- In office April 18, 1876 – January 11, 1881
- Preceded by: District Inactive
- Succeeded by: William Henry Burges

Member of the Texas House of Representatives from the 27th district
- In office January 14, 1873 – April 18, 1876
- Preceded by: Anderson J. Dorris
- Succeeded by: George U. Mead; Philip Edward Peers

Personal details
- Born: October 6, 1834 Chattooga County, Georgia, U.S.
- Died: March 28, 1909 (aged 74) Austin, Texas, U.S.
- Party: Democratic
- Spouse: Lucinda J. Ellison (m. 1859)
- Children: 10
- Education: Austin College

Military service
- Allegiance: Confederacy
- Branch/service: Confederate States Army
- Years of service: 1862–1865
- Rank: First lieutenant
- Unit: Company B, 26th Texas Cavalry Regiment
- Battles/wars: American Civil War; Battle of Galveston; Battle of Mansfield; Battle of Pleasant Hill; Battle of Monett's Ferry

Leonidas Jefferson Storey (October 6, 1834 – March 28, 1909) was an American politician and military officer who served as the 13th lieutenant governor of Texas from 1881 to 1883. A member of the Democratic Party, he served in both houses of the Texas Legislature from 1873 to 1881.

== Biography ==
Leonidas Jefferson Storey was born on October 6, 1834, to John Thompson and Lucy (née McLester) Storey in Chattooga County, Georgia, near Summerville. Margaret (née Thompson) and Edward Storey, both of old families of Virginia, were his paternal grandparents. His mother's parents, John and Araminta McLester, were of North Carolina. John T. and Edward Storey both fought in the War of 1812–1815, serving in the same regiment when the former was seventeen years of age. His father later moved from North Carolina to Jackson County, Georgia, in 1818, later participating in the removal of the Cherokee from Georgia in 1833. John Thompson Storey served many years in the Georgia Legislature and was a member of the Whig party. In 1845, the family moved to Gonzales, Texas, and two years later, to Lockhart.

Leonidas Jefferson Storey attended Austin College under Rev. Daniel Baker for one term, which he passed. He returned home due to sickness, and later began to read law in Lockhart in 1858, under Rogan and Whitis. He married Lucinda J. Ellison a year later and they would go on to have ten children together.

Before the Civil War, Storey earnestly opposed and canvassed against secession. After secession he fought in the 26th Texas Cavalry Regiment. He rose from the rank of second lieutenant to first lieutenant of B Company.

From January 14, 1873, to April 18, 1876, Storey represented the 27th district, which included the county of Caldwell, in the Texas House of Representatives. After his tenure in the house, he was a member of the Texas Senate from 1876 to 1881, representing District 31.

In 1880, Storey was elected as the 13th lieutenant governor of Texas. He served in the office from January 18, 1881, to January 16, 1883, before leaving after a single term. Governor Jim Hogg appointed Storey to the Railroad Commission of Texas in 1892, eventually becoming chairman on January 20, 1903. He held the position until his death on March 28, 1909, at the age of 74.

Texas House of Representatives
Preceded by Anderson J. Dorris	Member of the Texas House of Representatives from District 27 (Lockhart); 1873–1876	Succeeded by George U. Mead; Philip Edward Peers
Texas Senate
Preceded by District Inactive	Member of the Texas Senate from District 31 (Lockhart); 1876–1881	Succeeded by William Henry Burges
Political offices
Preceded by Joseph D. Sayers	13th Lieutenant Governor of Texas; 1881–1883	Succeeded by Francis Marion Martin
Preceded by William P. McLean	Member of the Railroad Commission of Texas; 1894–1909	Succeeded by William D. Williams
Preceded by John H. Reagan	Chairman of the Railroad Commission of Texas; 1903–1909	Succeeded by Allison Mayfield
