= Silas Hare =

American politician (1827–1908)

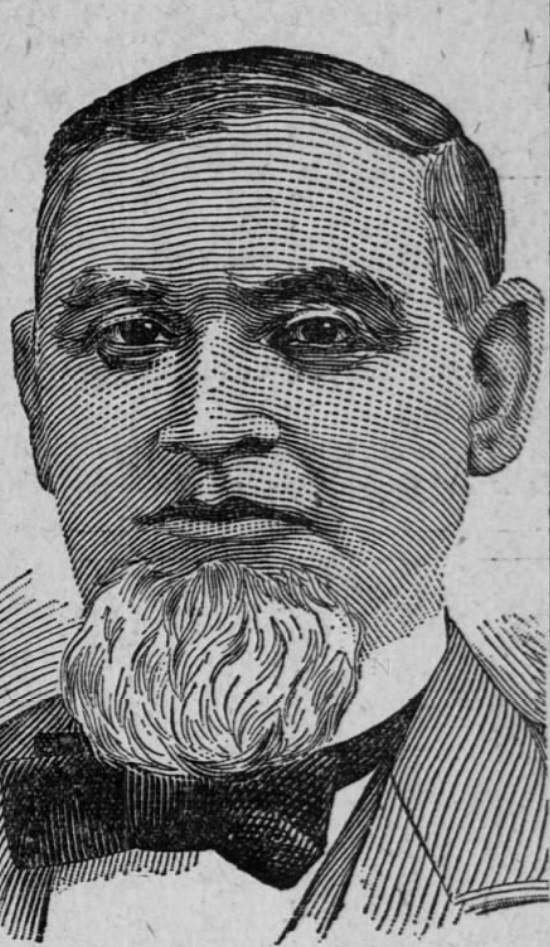
- From The San Francisco Call, February 9, 1902

Member of the U.S. House of Representatives from Texas's 5th district
- In office March 4, 1887 – March 3, 1891
- Preceded by: James W. Throckmorton
- Succeeded by: Joseph W. Bailey

Texas Criminal Court District Judge Dallas County, Collin County, Grayson County
- In office 1873–1876

Chief Justice of Confederate New Mexico Territory
- In office 1862

Personal details
- Born: November 13, 1827 Ross County, Ohio, U.S.
- Died: November 26, 1908 (aged 81) Washington, D.C., U.S.
- Party: Democratic
- Spouse(s): Octavia Elizabeth Rector (m. 1849; died 1890) Mary Louise Kennedy (m. 1903)
- Children: 7
- Profession: Lawyer

Military service
- Allegiance: United States (1846-1847); CSA (1862-1865)
- Branch/service: US Army; Confederate Army
- Years of service: 1846-1847; 1862-1865
- Rank: Major (1863, Civil War)
- Unit: 1st Indiana Volunteers (Mexican-American War); First Regiment of the Arizona Brigade (Civil War)
- Battles/wars: Mexican–American War; Battle of Buena Vista; American Civil War

Silas Hare (November 13, 1827 – November 26, 1908) was an American lawyer and politician who served two terms as a U.S. representative from Texas from 1887 to 1891.

== Early years ==
Silas Hare Sr. was born in Ross County, Ohio, to Jacob and Elizabeth Freshour Hare on November 13, 1827, and lived the first fourteen years of his life with his grandfather Daniel Hare. His father died in 1835, and in 1841, Hare rejoined his mother and other family members in Hamilton County, Indiana, near Noblesville, where he attended common and private schools. He studied law in Noblesville, and was admitted to the Indiana Bar Association in 1850 and commenced practice in Noblesville, Indiana.

Hare moved to Belton, Texas, in 1853 where he continued the practice of law. In 1852, Hare began traveling to improve his health. He visited Mexico, Central America, Hawaii (at that time, the Sandwich Islands), Oregon.

== Military service ==
Hare served during the Mexican–American War in the 1st Indiana Volunteers 1846 and 1847. At the Battle of Buena Vista, Hare was wounded by a lance.

During the Civil War Hare served as a captain in the Confederate States Army. He was appointed quartermaster, and later attained the rank of major in 1863, with the First Regiment of the Arizona Brigade stationed in Texas.

== Public service ==
In 1862, he was appointed as Chief Justice of New Mexico territory under the Confederacy, but resigned that year to accept a position as captain in the Confederate Army. Hare settled in Sherman, Texas, in 1865 and resumed the practice of law. He served as district judge of the criminal court 1873–1876. He served as delegate to the Democratic National Convention in 1884.

=== Congress ===
Hare was elected as a Democrat to the Fiftieth and Fifty-first Congresses (March 4, 1887 – March 3, 1891). He was an unsuccessful candidate for renomination in 1890.

== Later career ==
In 1890, Hare resumed the practice of law in Washington, D.C.

== Personal life ==
In 1849, he married Octavia Elizabeth Rector of Circleville, Ohio. The couple had seven children: West Point cadet Luther Rector; Silas Jr who followed his father in public service; in addition to Winnie, Henry, George, Eula, and one child who died in infancy. Octavia died June 5, 1890.

In 1903, the 76-year-old Hare married for a second time to 66-year-old Mary Louise Kennedy in a secret ceremony in Baltimore, Maryland, taking his friends by surprise. The elopement left the New York Times speculating about the honeymoon, "They have not returned, and the ex-Congressman's friends have no idea where they are."

== Death ==
Silas Hare died in Washington, D.C., on November 26, 1908.

Mary Louise Kennedy Hare died November 3, 1912.

== Sources ==
- United States Congress. "Silas Hare (id: H000203)". Biographical Directory of the United States Congress.

U.S. House of Representatives
Preceded by James W. Throckmorton	Member of the U.S. House of Representatives from Texas's 5th congressional district 1887–1891	Succeeded by Joseph W. Bailey
