= Francis Marion Martin =

Texas Lieutenant Governor

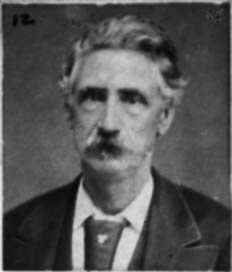

14th Lieutenant Governor of Texas
- In office January 16, 1883 – January 20, 1885
- Governor: John Ireland
- Preceded by: Leonidas Jefferson Storey
- Succeeded by: Barnett Gibbs

Member of the Texas Senate
- In office November 7, 1859 – November 4, 1861
- Constituency: 22nd district
- In office January 14, 1879 – January 9, 1883
- Constituency: 14th district

Personal details
- Born: April 1, 1830 Livingston County, Kentucky, U.S.
- Died: June 11, 1903 (aged 73) Corsicana, Texas, U.S.
- Party: Democratic (until 1886)
- Other political affiliations: Prohibition (1886-1888); Populist (after 1890)
- Children: 10

Francis Marion Martin (April 1, 1830 – June 11, 1903) was an American clerk, rancher, and politician who served as the 14th lieutenant governor of Texas from 1883 to 1885. A member of the Democratic Party, he served in the Texas Senate and the Confederate States Army. Martin was a Populist and a Prohibitionist who drew support from various parties.

Francis Marion Martin was born in Livingston County, Kentucky to James and Elizabeth (née Cofield) Martin on April 1, 1830. They died while he was young, and Martin was raised by William Northern Hodge. In 1850, Martin married Hodge's daughter, eventually having seven children with her.

Martin served in the Texas Senate from 1859 to 1861 and again from 1879 to 1883. In between his terms in the state senate, he was a delegate to the Texas constitutional convention in 1875. Martin served as the 14th lieutenant governor of Texas from January 16, 1883, to January 20, 1885, under John Ireland. Due to his disagreements with Governor Ireland, Martin chose not to run for reelection. In 1886, Martin used his popularity with the prohibitionists, Knights of Labor, and Farmer's Alliance to campaign for governor, but lost the convention to Sul Ross at which point he left the Democratic party. Martin's campaigning for a statewide referendum on prohibition in 1887 led the Prohibition Party to nominate him for governor in 1888. At the time Texas was part of the Solid South and the Democrats were overwhelmingly favored in state election. In order to increase the odds of support, all the opposition parties in Texas endorsed Martin as the fusion candidate, but Ross was a popular governor and Martin only received 28% of the vote. Martin had a couple more campaigns for statewide office in 1892 and 1894 as the Populist Party's candidate for lieutenant governor, but he again was unsuccessful.

In his later life, he served as mayor of Cleburne, Texas. Martin died on June 11, 1903, and was buried in Corsicana, Texas.

Political offices
Preceded by Leonidas Jefferson Storey	Lieutenant Governor of Texas; 1883–1885	Succeeded by Barnett Gibbs
