= Anthony Banning Norton =

American politician (1821–1893)

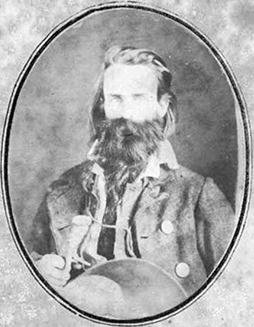
- Norton in 1860

Member of the Texas House of Representatives from the 19th district
- In office November 2, 1857 – November 4, 1861
- Preceded by: Joseph Martin
- Succeeded by: Henry Dillahunty

Member of the Texas House of Representatives from the 67th district
- In office November 5, 1855 – November 2, 1857
- Preceded by: Edward Rowzee Hord
- Succeeded by: John L. Haynes

Personal details
- Born: May 15, 1821 Mount Vernon, Ohio, U.S.
- Died: December 31, 1893 (aged 72) Dallas, Texas, U.S.
- Party: Know Nothing (1855–1860)
- Other political affiliations: Whig (before 1855); Constitutional Union (1860); Republican (after 1868)
- Spouses: H. Ellen Burr; H. Maria Neyland; Mary Martin
- Relations: Daniel Sheldon Norton (brother)
- Children: 5
- Parent(s): Daniel Sheldon Norton; Sarah Banning
- Education: Kenyon College
- Occupation: Journalist, historian, politician

Anthony Banning Norton (May 15, 1821 – December 31, 1893) was an American journalist, historian and state politician. He was the publisher of newspapers in Ohio and Texas, and a Know Nothing member of the Texas House of Representatives. He later served as the postmaster of Dallas, Texas, and a United States Marshal for North Texas. He was the author of three books.

== Early life ==
Anthony Banning Norton was born on May 15, 1821, in Mount Vernon, Ohio. His parents, Daniel Sheldon Norton and Sarah Banning, were planters from Louisiana. His brother, Daniel Sheldon Norton, became a politician.

Norton "graduated from Kenyon College in 1840" and studied the Law in Pennsylvania.

== Career ==
Norton joined the Whig Party, and he published The True Whig and Chippewa War Club, later known as Norton's Daily True Whig, a newspaper in Mount Vernon from 1848 to 1855.

Norton joined the Know Nothing political party, and he served as a member of the Texas House of Representatives from 1855 to 1861. He was also an Adjutant General appointed by Governor Sam Houston.

He founded "the Fort Worth Chief", the town’s first newspaper.

After the American Civil War, Norton was the publisher of another newspaper, Norton's Union Intelligencer. He became the postmaster of Dallas, Texas in 1875, and a United States Marshal for North Texas in 1879. He was the Republican nominee for Texas Governor in 1878 and 1884.

Norton was the author of three books.

== Personal life and death ==
Norton was married three times. With his first wife, H. Ellen Burr, he had two children. In 1857, he married H. Maria Neyland, and they had three children. In 1892, he married Mary Martin.

Norton died on December 31, 1893, in Dallas, Texas.

== Works ==
- A History of Knox County, Ohio, from 1779 to 1862 (1862)
- The Great Revolution of 1840, Reminiscences of the Log Cabin and Hard Cider Campaign (1888)
- Tippecanoe Songs of the Log Cabin Boys and Girls of 1840 (1888)

Party political offices
Preceded by William Chambers	Republican nominee for Governor of Texas; 1878	Succeeded by Edmund J. Davis
Preceded by George Washington Jones	Republican nominee for Governor of Texas; 1884	Succeeded by Archelaus M. Cochran
