= William Thomas Clark =

American politician (1831–1905)

William T. Clark
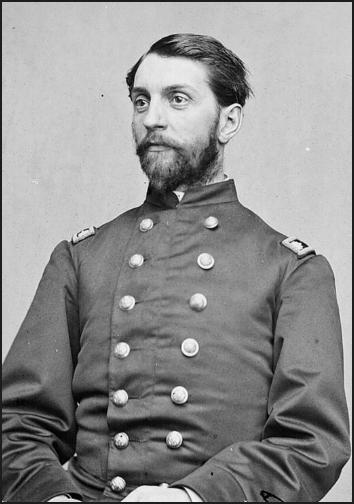
- William Thomas Clark

Member of the U.S. House of Representatives from Texas's 3rd district
- In office March 31, 1870 – May 13, 1872
- Preceded by: District created
- Succeeded by: Dewitt Clinton Giddings

Personal details
- Born: William Thomas Clark; June 29, 1831 Norwalk, Connecticut, U.S.
- Died: October 12, 1905 (aged 74) New York City, New York, U.S.
- Resting place: Arlington National Cemetery

Military service
- Allegiance: United States; Union
- Branch/service: United States Army; Union Army
- Years of service: 1861 – 1866
- Rank: Brigadier General; Brevet Major General
- Battles/wars: American Civil War

William Thomas Clark (June 29, 1831 – October 12, 1905) was an American soldier and politician, serving as a general in the Union army during the American Civil War and as a Reconstruction era U.S. Congressman.

== Birth and early years ==
Clark was born in Norwalk, Connecticut. He became a school teacher and moved in 1854 to New York City, where he passed the bar exam. After marrying, he moved to Iowa and established a legal practice.

== Civil War ==
At the beginning of the Civil War, he became a lieutenant and adjutant of the 13th Iowa Infantry Regiment. He fought at the battle of Shiloh and Corinth. He served as assistant adjutant general in the XVII Corps during the siege of Vicksburg and assistant adjutant-general to the Army of the Tennessee during the Atlanta campaign. He was made a brevet brigadier general for service in the Atlanta Campaign and was assigned to an infantry brigade in the XV Corps during the Carolinas Campaign, but was only lightly engaged in fighting. He rose to the full rank of brigadier general of volunteers (1865) and was made a brevet major general at the close of the same year for gallant and meritorious services during the war.

== Later years ==
After the war, he made his home in Galveston, Texas, where he organized the first negro school and befriended negroes at the risk of his life. He founded the First National Bank and was its first cashier, and also served as postmaster.

=== Congress ===
He was a Republican. As a representative from Texas in Congress in 1870–72, he obtained the first appropriation for the harbor of Galveston ($100,000), making possible the completion of the jetties there.

== Death ==
He died in New York City on October 12, 1905, at the age of 74.

== See also ==
- List of American Civil War generals (Union)

U.S. House of Representatives
Preceded by District created	Member of the U.S. House of Representatives from Texas's 3rd congressional district March 30, 1870 – May 13, 1872	Succeeded by Dewitt C. Giddings
