= List of mayors of Seguin, Texas =

The following is a list of mayors of Seguin, Texas.

Mayors of Seguin, Texas
Years of service	Mayor	Image
1838–1846	Established - Unincorporated - Part of Gonzales County - Asa J. L. Sowell	
1846–53	Michael H. Erskine - Chief Justice - 1st City Charter - Part of Guadalupe County	
1853	John R. King - 1st Mayor - Incorporated	
1853–57	John D. Anderson - Elected - Incorporated	
1858	John Ireland - 18th governor of Texas	
1858–59	Joseph F. Johnson	
1859–61	Washington E. Goodrich	
1862–65	The City Charter was not maintained during the Civil War.	
1866–72	March 30, 1870 - The United States Congress readmits Texas into the Union.	
1873–74	William M. Rust	
1874–78	R. J. Burges	
1878–80	T. D. Johnson	
1882–87	John A. Neill	
1887–89	F. H. Vaughn	
1890–1910	Joseph Zorn. Jr.	
1910–12	Hilmar H. Weinert	
1912–22	Charles Bruns	
1922–26	Robert E. Blumberg	
1926–28	A. P. Stautzenberger	
1928–38	Maximilian H. "Max" Starcke	
1938–60	Roger W. Moore	
1960–62	Winfred Owen	
1962–66	Richard Joseph "Joe" Burges	
1966–82	Alfred H. Koebig	
1983–89	Betty Jean Jones	
1990–95	Ed Gotthardt	
1996–2005	Mark Stautzenberger	
2006–12	Betty Ann Matthies	
2013–2019	Don Keil	
2020–Present	Donna Dodgen	
