= George Taylor Jester =

American politician (1847–1922)

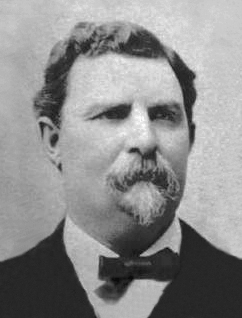
George T. Jester

George Taylor Jester (August 23, 1847 – July 19, 1922) was an American businessman and politician who served as the 19th lieutenant governor of Texas from 1895 to 1899.

== Biography ==
He was born in Macoupin County, Illinois to Levi and Diadema Jester, and had several siblings. After their father died in 1851, their mother moved the family to Navarro County, Texas, where she joined her father.

After trying several professions including merchandising, Jester founded what would become the Corsicana National Bank with two of his brothers. In 1890, he was elected to the Texas House of Representatives and served a term. He was elected to the Texas Senate in 1892. There he served for a single legislative session before he received the Democratic Party's nomination for lieutenant governor. He won the 1894 election and served two terms in the office before retiring from politics and returning to Corsicana. He died there in 1922.

Jester married and had a family. His son Beauford served as Governor of Texas from 1947 to 1949.

Texas House of Representatives
| Preceded by Jehu Brown | Member of the Texas House of Representatives from District 60 (Corsicana); 1891–1893 | Succeeded by James I. Moody |
Political offices
| Preceded by Martin McNulty Crane | Lieutenant Governor of Texas; 1895–1899 | Succeeded by James Nathan Browning |
