= George Washington Jones (Texas politician) =

American politician

George W. Jones
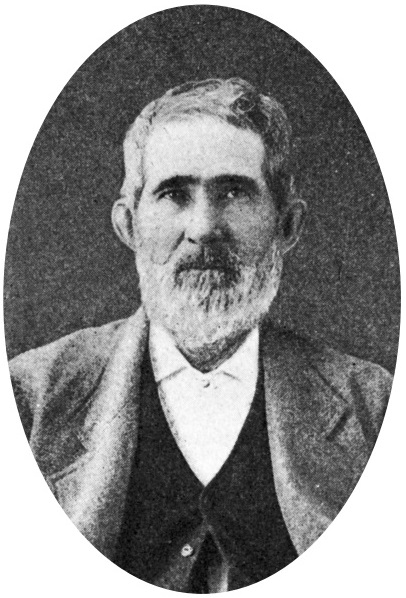

Member of the U.S. House of Representatives from Texas's 5th district
- In office March 4, 1879 – March 3, 1883
- Preceded by: Dewitt Clinton Giddings
- Succeeded by: James W. Throckmorton

10th Lieutenant Governor of Texas
- In office August 9, 1866 – August 8, 1867
- Governor: James W. Throckmorton
- Preceded by: Fletcher Stockdale
- Succeeded by: James W. Flanagan

Bastrop County Attorney
- In office 1858–1860

Personal details
- Born: George Washington Jones; September 5, 1828 Marion County, Alabama, U.S.
- Died: July 11, 1903 (aged 74) Bastrop, Texas, U.S.
- Resting place: Fairview Cemetery
- Party: Democratic (1866); Independent (1876–84) (Note: Jones had support from the Greenback and Republican parties for his bids for Congress and Governor.); Populist (1898)
- Spouse: Ledora Ann Mullins (m. 1855)
- Profession: Lawyer

Military service
- Allegiance: Confederate States
- Branch/service: Confederate States Army; Robert T. Allen’s; Seventeenth Texas Infantry
- Rank: Colonel

George Washington Jones (September 5, 1828 – July 11, 1903) was an American lawyer and politician who served as the 10th lieutenant governor of Texas and was a Greenback member of the United States House of Representatives from 1879 to 1883.

== Early life ==
George Washington Jones was born to William Dandridge Claiborne Jones and Rachel Burleson Jones on September 5, 1828, in Marion County, Alabama. He moved with his parents to Tipton County, Tennessee, and then to Bastrop, Texas. Jones studied law, was admitted to the bar in 1851, and commenced practice in Bastrop.

He owned slaves.

=== Early elected office ===
He narrowly lost a seat for the state legislature in 1856.

From 1858 until 1860, he served as Bastrop county attorney.

== Civil War ==
Although a supporter of the Union, Jones served in the Confederate States Army, eventually attaining the rank of colonel as commander of the 17th Texas Infantry Regiment.

== Public service ==
He was a delegate to the Texas state constitutional convention in 1866. Jones was elected lieutenant governor in 1866, with James W. Throckmorton as governor. Both Jones and Throckmorton were removed from office in 1867 by General Philip Henry Sheridan for being obstructions to Reconstruction.

=== Congress ===
Jones ran an unsuccessful campaign for congress in 1876, but in 1878, Jones was elected as United States Congressman for the Texas 5th Congressional District. He was reelected in 1880 and served from March 4, 1879, to March 3, 1883. He was not a candidate for re-election in 1882. Instead opting to run an independent campaign for governor. His campaign was backed by both the Greenback and Republican parties, but he lost to former Texas Supreme Court Justice John Ireland. Jones ran against Ireland again in 1884, but saw his support fall as this time he did not have the backing of the Republican party.

Jones left politics until he attempted to run for congress as a member of the Populist Party in 1898, but he was again unsuccessful.

== Personal life and death ==
On August 1, 1855, he married Ledora Ann Mullins in Bastrop.

Jones died on July 11, 1903. Ledora Jones died on August 31, 1903. They are both interred at Fairview Cemetery in Bastrop.

== Notes ==
Party political offices
Preceded by William H. Hamman	Greenback nominee for Governor of Texas; 1880, 1882	Succeeded by None
Preceded by Edmund J. Davis	Republican nominee for Governor of Texas; 1882	Succeeded by Anthony Banning Norton
Political offices
Preceded by Fletcher Stockdale	Lieutenant Governor of Texas; 1866–1867	Succeeded by James W. Flanagan
U.S. House of Representatives
Preceded by De Witt C. Giddings	Member of the U.S. House of Representatives from Texas's 5th congressional district 1879–1883	Succeeded by James W. Throckmorton
