= D. C. Giddings =

American politician

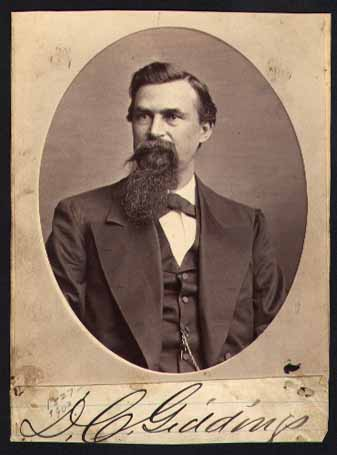

Member of the U.S. House of Representatives from Texas
- In office March 4, 1877 – March 3, 1879
- Preceded by: John Hancock
- Succeeded by: George Washington Jones
- Constituency: 5th district
- In office May 13, 1872 – March 3, 1875
- Preceded by: William Thomas Clark
- Succeeded by: James W. Throckmorton
- Constituency: 3rd district

Personal details
- Born: Dewitt Clinton Giddings; July 18, 1827 Susquehanna County, Pennsylvania, U.S.
- Died: August 19, 1903 (aged 76) Brenham, Texas, U.S.
- Resting place: Prairie Lea Cemetery
- Party: Democratic
- Spouse: Malinda C. Lusk
- Children: 5
- Profession: Lawyer

Military service
- Allegiance: Confederate States Army
- Branch/service: 21st Texas Cavalry
- Rank: Lieutenant Colonel
- Battles/wars: American Civil War: Arkansas Campaign; Louisiana Campaign; John S. Marmaduke's Missouri Raid

Dewitt Clinton Giddings (July 18, 1827 – August 19, 1903) was an American lawyer and politician who served three non-consecutive terms in the United States House of Representatives as a representative from Texas in the 1870s.

== Early life ==
Dewitt Clinton Giddings was born July 18, 1827, in Susquehanna County, Pennsylvania. He was the youngest of eight children of James and Lucy (Demming) Giddings. In addition to his brother, Jabez Demming Giddings, other of Giddings's brothers relocated from Pennsylvania to Texas. George Giddings and John James Giddings were successful operators of the San Antonio, Texas to Santa Fe, New Mexico Mail Line.

=== Early career ===
Giddings worked teaching school part-time to finance his education as a civil engineer and later was employed as a railroad engineer.

He began his legal studies in Honesdale, Pennsylvania in 1850.

When word reached home that Giddings's older brother, Giles, died of wounds received at the battle of San Jacinto, another brother, Jabez Demming Giddings, traveled to Texas to Claim Giles's land bounty. Giddings joined his brother in Brenham, Texas in 1852 and in 1853 was admitted to the Texas bar. He was his brother's junior partner in a law practice in Brenham.

== Military service ==
During the American Civil War Giddings served as Lieutenant Colonel of the 21st Texas Cavalry Regiment in the Confederate States Army.

== Public service ==
Giddings first served in the Forty-second Congress after a controversial election in which he defeated William T. Clark by 135 votes. Suspected voting irregularities gave the House seat to Clark initially, but Giddings successfully contested the election and took his seat in Congress. Giddings was reelected to the Forty-third Congress (May 13, 1872 – March 4, 1875) and to the Forty-fifth Congress (March 4, 1877 – March 4, 1879).

== Personal life ==
In 1860, he married Malinda C Lusk, daughter of Texas soldier and politician Samuel C. Lusk. The couple had five children, three of which survived to adulthood, De Witt, May Belle and Lilian.

== Death ==
On August 19, 1903, De Witt Clinton Giddings succumbed to heart disease and died in Brenham, Texas. He is buried along with his wife in Prairie Lea Cemetery in Brenham.

U.S. House of Representatives
Preceded by William T. Clark	Member of the U.S. House of Representatives from Texas's 3rd congressional district May 13, 1872 – March 3, 1875	Succeeded by James W. Throckmorton
Preceded by John Hancock	Member of the U.S. House of Representatives from Texas's 5th congressional district March 4, 1877 – March 3, 1879	Succeeded by George W. Jones
