= James W. Throckmorton =

Governor of Texas from 1866 to 1867

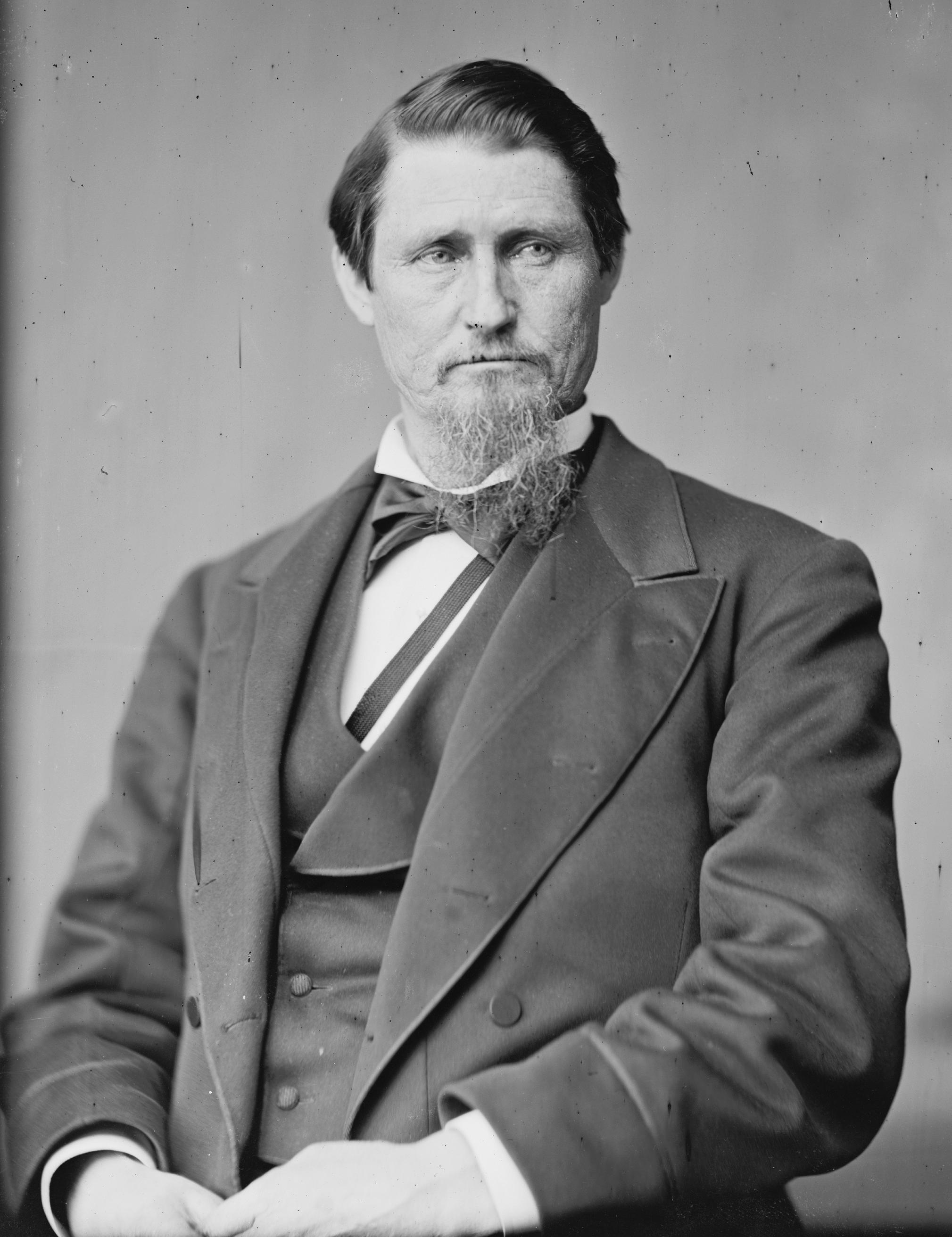
- Throckmorton, 1865–1880

Member of the U.S. House of Representatives from Texas
- In office March 4, 1883 – March 3, 1887
- Preceded by: George W. Jones
- Succeeded by: Silas Hare
- Constituency: 5th district
- In office March 4, 1875 – March 3, 1879
- Preceded by: Dewitt Clinton Giddings
- Succeeded by: Olin Wellborn
- Constituency: 3rd district

12th Governor of Texas
- In office August 9, 1866 – August 8, 1867
- Lieutenant: George Washington Jones
- Preceded by: Andrew J. Hamilton
- Succeeded by: Elisha M. Pease

Member of the Texas Senate
- In office November 2, 1857 – November 4, 1861
- Preceded by: Malachi W. Allen
- Succeeded by: Lewis F. Casey
- Constituency: 4th district
- In office November 2, 1863 – August 6, 1866
- Preceded by: William Dixon Lair
- Succeeded by: John K. Bumpass
- Constituency: 15th district

Member of the Texas House of Representatives
- In office November 3, 1851 – November 2, 1857
- Constituency: 25th district (1851–1853); 7th district (1853–1857)

Personal details
- Born: James Webb Throckmorton; February 1, 1825 Sparta, Tennessee, U.S.
- Died: April 21, 1894 (aged 69)
- Resting place: Pecan Grove Cemetery, McKinney, Texas
- Party: Democratic
- Profession: Politician
- Nickname: "Old Leathercoat"

Military service
- Allegiance: United States; Confederate States
- Branch/service: Confederate States Army
- Rank: Captain
- Unit: 1st Texas Volunteers; 6th Texas Cavalry
- Battles/wars: Mexican–American War; American Civil War

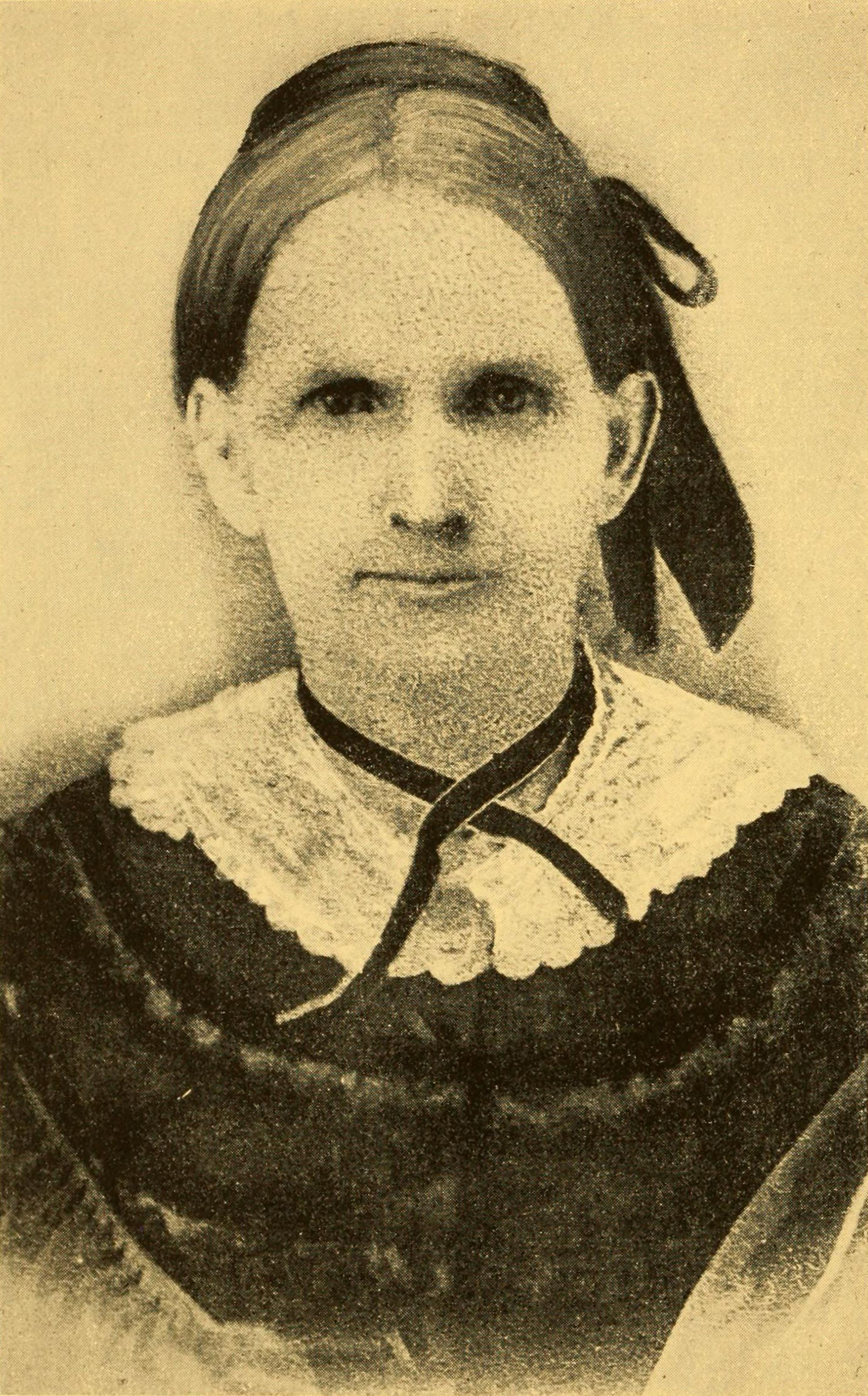
Annie Rattan Throckmorton

James Webb Throckmorton (February 1, 1825 – April 21, 1894) was an American politician who served as the 12th governor of Texas from 1866 to 1867 during the early days of Reconstruction. He was a United States congressman from Texas from 1875 to 1879 and again from 1883 to 1889.

== Biography ==
Following the outbreak of a Mexican–American War, he joined the 1st Texas Volunteers as a private in February 1847. A few months later, he was assigned as an assistant surgeon to the Texas Rangers, until receiving a medical discharge in June of that year. During the Texas secession convention in 1861, he was one of only eight delegates to vote against secession from the United States. One of the negative votes is enshrined in Texas history books. James Webb Throckmorton, from Collin County in North Texas, in response to the roar of hisses and boos and catcalls which greeted his decision, retorted, "When the rabble hiss, well may patriots tremble." Appreciating his style, the crowd afforded him a grudging round of applause (like many Texans who initially opposed secession, Throckmorton accepted the result and served his state, rising to the rank of brigadier-general in the Confederate army). Despite this, he served in the Confederate Army, first as a captain of Company K, 6th Texas Cavalry Regiment.

He was promoted to brigadier general by 1862. During late 1862 while stationed in North Texas, which was chaotic because of military and state militia abuses, he saved all but five men in Sherman, Texas, from being lynched by militia as suspects in anticonscription activities. Violent acts had spread in North Texas after the Great Hanging at Gainesville earlier in October 1862, when a total of 42 men were killed, most hanged.

Throckmorton entered Confederate service as a captain and later colonel in Texas frontier defense units. His early assignments involved protecting settlements from raids along the frontier rather than fighting in the major eastern or western theaters of the war. He saw action in Mississippi, but chronic kidney problems forced him to resign from field service. He was officially discharged on September 12, 1863 due to recurring illness. He served in the state senate in 1864, representing Collin and Grayson counties. In December 1864, he was commissioned brigadier general of the state's First Frontier District.The following year, Gen. E. Kirby Smith appointed Throckmorton Confederate commissioner to the American Indians.

=== Governor ===
Throckmorton defeated Elisha M. Pease in the Texas gubernatorial election of June 25, 1866, at the same time that the legislature approved a new constitution. He was elected with George Washington Jones as Lt. Gov. During his term as governor, Throckmorton's lenient attitude toward former Confederates and his attitude toward civil rights conflicted with the Reconstruction politics of the Radical Republicans in Congress. He angered the local military commander, Major General Charles Griffin, who persuaded his superior, Philip H. Sheridan, to remove Throckmorton from office and replace him with Elisha M. Pease, an appointed Republican and Unionist.

=== Congress ===
As the Radical Republicans' influence began to wane in the mid-1870s, Throckmorton was elected to Congress representing Texas's 3rd Congressional District in 1874 and re-elected in 1876. He was not a candidate in 1878. He again later served the 5th District, elected in 1882 and re-elected in 1884. He was not a candidate in 1886. In 1882 he was elected to the seat vacated by his former Lt. Gov. George Washington Jones, as G.W. Jones did not run for re-election.

=== Death ===
Throckmorton died at age 69 from a fall, having become frail due to kidney disease.

Party political offices
Vacant Title last held by Hardin Richard Runnels	Democratic nominee for Governor of Texas; 1865, 1866	Succeeded by Andrew Jackson Hamilton
Texas Senate
Preceded by Malachi W. Allen	Texas State Senator from District 4; 1857–1861	Succeeded by Lewis F. Casey
Preceded by J. J. Dickson	Texas State Senator from District 15; 1863–1866	Succeeded by John K. Bumpass
Political offices
Preceded by Andrew J. Hamilton	Governor of Texas; 1866-1867	Succeeded by Elisha M. Pease
U.S. House of Representatives
Preceded by Dewitt Clinton Giddings	Member of the U.S. House of Representatives from Texas's 3rd congressional district 1875–1879	Succeeded by Olin Wellborn
Preceded by George Washington Jones	Member of the U.S. House of Representatives from Texas's 5th congressional district 1883–1887	Succeeded by Silas Hare
