= 1882 Texas gubernatorial election =

- November 7, 1882
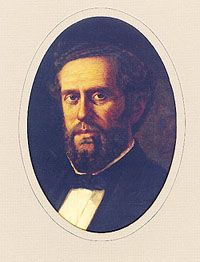

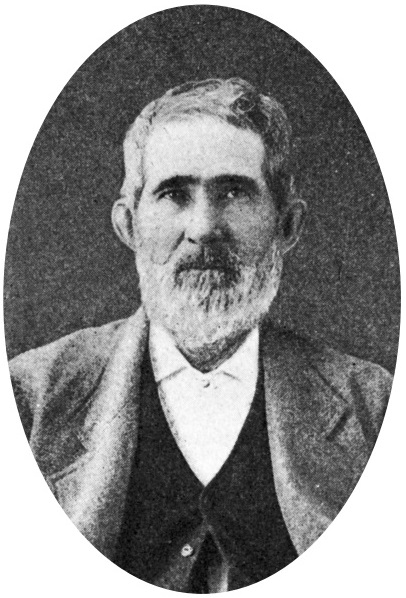
Candidate	John Ireland	George Washington Jones
Party	Democratic	Independent
Alliance		Republican; Greenback
Popular vote	150,809	102,501
Percentage	59.46%	40.41%
- County results Ireland: 50–60% 60–70% 70–80% 80–90% 90–100% Jones: 50–60% 60–70% 70–80% 80–90% 90–100% No Data/Vote
Governor before election
Oran Milo Roberts
Democratic
Governor-elect
John Ireland
Democratic

The 1882 Texas gubernatorial election was held to elect the Governor of Texas. John Ireland was elected over U.S. Representative George Washington "Wash" Jones, an independent with Republican and Greenback support.

Ireland was the third consecutive Governor to have been elected from the Texas Supreme Court.

== General election ==
There were a faction of the Democratic Party who were opposed to the campaign of State Supreme Court Justice John Ireland and attempted to push for the renomination of Oran Roberts for a third term at the state convention. Roberts rejected such an effort, and failing to find an alternate candidate, Ireland was nominated by acclamation.

At the time, Texas was a part of the "Solid South" and the Democratic party was overwhelmingly favored in state elections. The previous couple of elections had split opposition support between the Republican and Greenback parties. In an attempt to improve their odds at success, a strategy of electoral fusionism was attempted and both parties endorsed the independent campaign of congressman and former lieutenant governor George Washington Jones for governor.

=== Candidates ===
- John Ireland, former Associate Justice of the Texas Supreme Court, former state senator and representative, delegate at the state constitutional conventions of 1866 and 1875, candidate for U.S. senate 1876, candidate for congress 1878, former mayor of Seguin (Democratic)
- George Washington Jones, U.S. Representative from Bastrop, former lieutenant governor, delegate at the state constitutional convention of 1866 (Independent)
- Jerome Bonaparte Robertson, Brigadier General in the Confederate Army, former superintendent of the Texas Bureau of Immigration (Independent Democrat)

=== Results ===
1882 Texas gubernatorial election
Party	Candidate	Votes	%	±%
Democratic	John Ireland	150,809	59.46%	▼6.03
Independent	George W. Jones	102,501	40.41%	N/A
Independent Democrat	J.B. Robertson	334	0.13%	N/A
Total votes		253,644	100.00%	
