= Lawrence Sullivan Ross =

Governor of Texas from 1887 to 1891

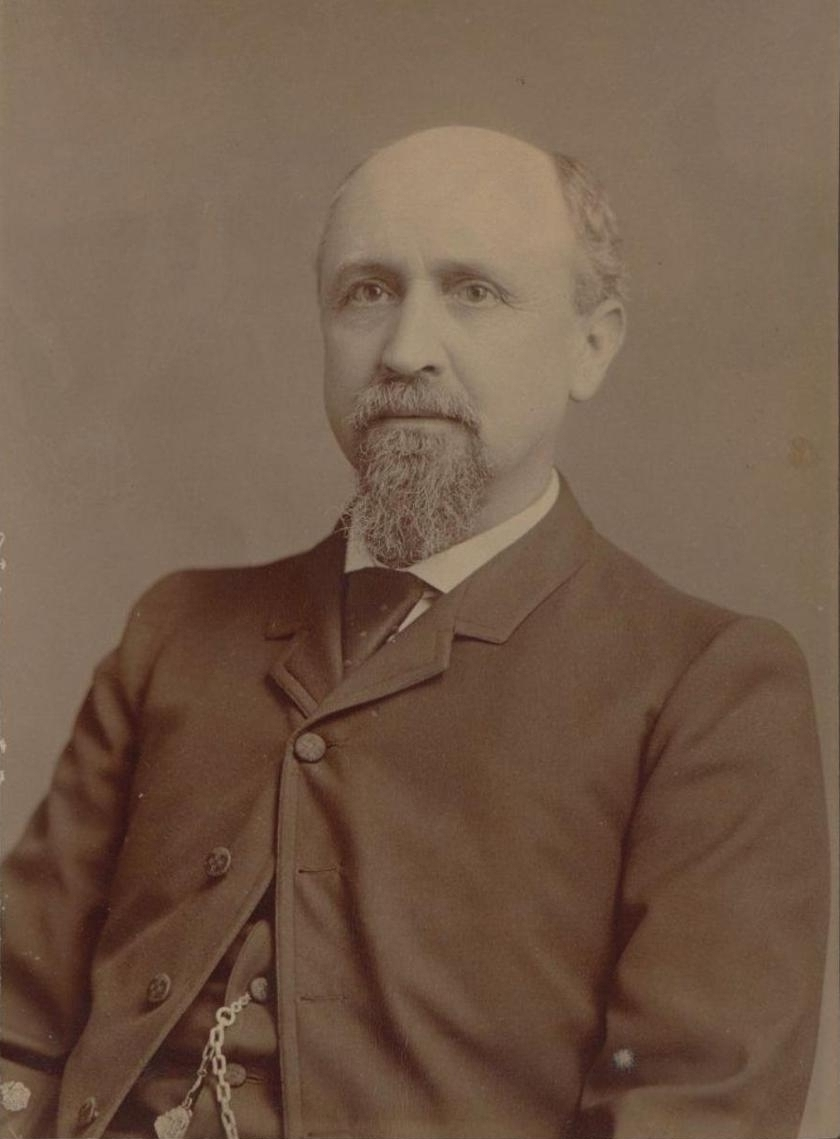

4th President of the Agricultural and Mechanical College of Texas
- In office January 20, 1891 – January 3, 1898
- Preceded by: William Stuart Lorraine Bringhurst (acting)
- Succeeded by: Roger Haddock Whitlock (acting)

19th Governor of Texas
- In office January 18, 1887 – January 20, 1891
- Lieutenant: Thomas Benton Wheeler
- Preceded by: John Ireland
- Succeeded by: Jim Hogg

Member of the Texas Senate from the 22nd district
- In office January 11, 1881 – January 9, 1883
- Preceded by: John W. Moore
- Succeeded by: John Alfred Martin

Personal details
- Born: September 27, 1838 Benton's Post, Iowa Territory, U.S. (present-day Bentonsport, Iowa, U.S.)
- Died: January 3, 1898 (aged 59) Brazos County, Texas, U.S.
- Resting place: Oakwood Cemetery, Waco, Texas, U.S.
- Party: Democratic
- Spouse: Elizabeth Tinsley (m. 1861)
- Education: Baylor University; Florence Wesleyan University (BA)

Military service
- Allegiance: Texas; Confederacy
- Branch/service: Texas Rangers; Confederate States Army (CSA)
- Years of service: 1860–1861; 1861–1865
- Rank: Captain (Texas Rangers); Brigadier general (CSA)
- Commands: 6th Texas Cavalry Regiment; Phifer's Cavalry Brigade; Ross's Cavalry Brigade
- Battles/wars: Indian Wars; Pease River fight; American Civil War; Battle of Pea Ridge; Second Battle of Corinth; Battle of Hatchie's Bridge; Battle of Thompson's Station; Battle of Yazoo City; Battle of Brown's Mill; Franklin-Nashville Campaign

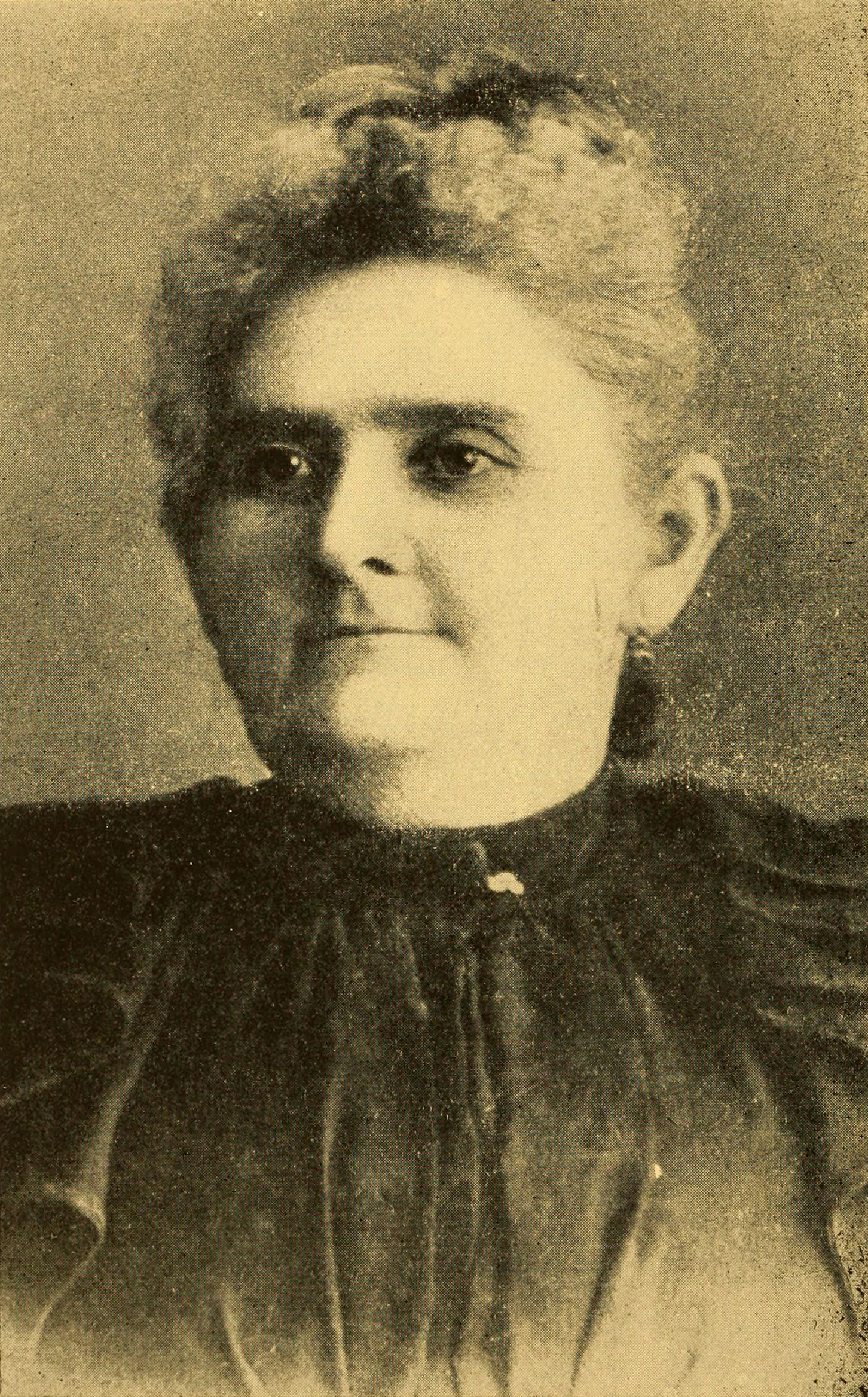
Elizabeth Tinsley Ross

Lawrence Sullivan "Sul" Ross (September 27, 1838 – January 3, 1898) was the 19th governor of Texas, a Confederate States Army general during the American Civil War, and the fourth president of the Agricultural and Mechanical College of Texas, now called Texas A&M University.

Ross was raised in the Republic of Texas, which was later annexed to the United States. Much of his childhood was spent on the frontier, where his family founded the town of Waco. Ross attended Baylor University (then located in Independence, Texas) and Florence Wesleyan University in Florence, Alabama. On one of his summer breaks, he suffered severe injuries while fighting Comanches. After graduation, Ross joined the Texas Rangers, and in 1860, led Texas Rangers in the Battle of Pease River, where federal troops recaptured Cynthia Ann Parker, who had been captured by the Comanches as a child in 1836.

When Texas seceded from the United States and joined the Confederacy, Ross joined the Confederate States Army. He participated in 135 battles and skirmishes and became one of the youngest Confederate generals. Following the Civil War, Ross briefly served as sheriff of McLennan County before resigning to participate in the 1875 Texas Constitutional Convention. With the exception of a two-year term as a state senator, Ross spent the next decade focused on his farm and ranch concerns. In 1887, he became the 19th governor of Texas. During his two terms, he oversaw the dedication of the new Texas State Capitol and resolved the Jaybird-Woodpecker War. Despite his popularity, Ross refused to run for a third term as governor. Days after leaving office, he became the fourth president of the Agricultural and Mechanical College of Texas (now Texas A&M University). He is credited with reorganizing the university's finances to save it from closure by the state legislature and opening the first classes to women (the daughters and nieces of the professors). His tenure saw a large expansion in college facilities and the birth of many school traditions. After his death, the Texas Legislature created Sul Ross State University in his honor.

== Early years ==
Lawrence Sullivan Ross was born on September 27, 1838, in Benton's Post, Iowa Territory. He was the fourth child and second son of Shapley Prince Ross and Catherine Fulkerson. Ross was jointly named for his paternal uncle, Giles O. Sullivan, and his father's grandfather and brother, both named Lawrence Ross. The senior Lawrence Ross had been captured by Native Americans as a child, and lived with them from the time he was six years old until he was rescued at 23. His father, Shapley Ross, was a ranger and Indian agent who often skirmished with Native Americans on the frontier. The experiences and stories told to young Sul caused him to grow up with an animosity towards the native tribes. To differentiate Ross from his uncle and great-grandfather, he was called "Little Sul" when he was a child, and later "Sul".

Shortly after Ross's birth, his parents sold their Iowa property and returned to Missouri to escape Iowa's cold weather. In 1839, the family moved to Milam County in the Republic of Texas, where they settled in Robertson's Colony on the lower Brazos River. Two years later, they joined seven other families under Captain Daniel Monroe and settled near present-day Cameron, where they received 640 acres (260 ha) of land along the Little River. While living in Milam, they became slave owners, enabled by the government grant of land. Their land adjoined Comanche territory and was raided several times.

In 1845, the family moved to Austin so Ross and his older siblings could attend school. Four years later, they relocated again. By this time, Shapley Ross was well known as a frontiersman, and to coax him to settle in the newly formed community of Waco, the family was given four city lots, exclusive rights to operate a ferry across the Brazos, and the right to buy 80 acres (32 ha) of farmland at US$1 per acre. In March 1849, the Ross family built the first house in Waco, a double-log cabin on a bluff overlooking the springs. Ross's sister Kate soon became the first Caucasian child born in Waco.

Eager to further his education, Ross entered the Preparatory Department at Baylor University (then in Independence, Texas) in 1856, despite the fact that he was several years older than most of the other students. He completed the two-year study course in one year. Following his graduation, he enrolled at Florence Wesleyan University in Florence, Alabama. The Wesleyan faculty originally deemed his mathematics knowledge so lacking, they refused his admittance; the decision was rescinded after a professor agreed to tutor Ross privately in the subject. At Wesleyan, students lived with prominent families instead of congregating in dormitories, thus giving them "daily exposure to good manners and refinement". Ross lived with the family of his tutor.

== Wichita Village fight ==
During the summer of 1858, Ross returned to Texas and journeyed to the Brazos Indian Reserve, where his father served as Indian agent. The United States Army had conscripted Indians from the reserve to help the "Wichita Expedition" of 2nd Cavalry in a search for Buffalo Hump, a Penateka Comanche chief who had led several deadly raids on Texas settlements. Fearing that Shapley Ross was too ill to lead them on the expedition, the Indians appointed Sul Ross as commander. With his father's approval, the younger Ross led the 135 warriors to accompany 225 troops led by brevet Major Earl Van Dorn. Ross was given the courtesy title of "Captain" during his command.

Native scouts found about 500 Comanches, including Buffalo Hump, camped outside a Wichita village in Indian Territory. Early in the battle, Ross and his men successfully stampeded the Comanche horses, leaving the Comanche warriors at a disadvantage when facing the mounted troops. When many Comanche tried to flee the area, Ross, one of his scouts, Lieutenant Cornelius Van Camp of the 2nd Cavalry, and one of his troopers chased a party of noncombatants that appeared to contain a white child. On Ross's orders, his man grabbed the child; as the four turned to rejoin the battle, they were confronted by 25 Comanche warriors. Van Camp and the private were killed with arrows, and Ross received an arrow through his shoulder. A Comanche picked up the trooper's carbine and fired a 0.58-caliber bullet through Ross's chest. His attacker, Mohee, was a Comanche warrior Ross had known since childhood. Mohee was killed by buckshot fired by Lieutenant James Majors of the 2nd Cavalry as the warrior approached the temporarily paralyzed Ross with a scalping knife.

After five hours of fighting, the troops subdued the Comanche resistance. Buffalo Hump escaped, but 70 Comanches were killed or mortally wounded, two of them noncombatants. Ross's injuries were severe, and for five days, he lay under a tree on the battlefield, unable to be moved. His wounds became infected, and Ross begged the others to kill him to end his pain. When he was able to travel, he was first carried on a litter suspended between two mules, and then on the shoulders of his men. He recovered fully, but experienced some pain for much of the rest of the year.

In his written report, Van Dorn praised Ross highly. The Dallas Herald printed the report on October 10, and other state newspapers also praised Ross's bravery. General Winfield Scott learned of Ross's role and offered him a direct commission in the Army. Eager to finish his education, Ross declined Scott's offer, and returned to school in Alabama.

The following year, Ross graduated from Wesleyan with a Bachelor of Arts and returned to Texas. Once there, he discovered no one had been able to trace the family of the young Caucasian girl rescued during the Wichita Village fight. He adopted the child and named her Lizzie Ross, in honor of his new fiancée, Elizabeth Dorothy Tinsley.

== Texas Rangers ==
=== Enlistment ===
In early 1860, Ross enlisted in Captain J. M. Smith's Waco company of Texas Rangers, which formed to fight the Native Americans. Smith appointed Ross his second lieutenant. When Smith was promoted, the other men in the company unanimously voted to make Ross the new captain. In conjunction with several other Ranger companies, Ross led his men to retaliate against a Kickapoo tribe, who had murdered two white families. The tribe had been warned of the Rangers's approach and set the prairie ablaze. The Rangers were forced to abandon their mission when confronted with the massive wildfire.

Smith disbanded Ross's company in early September 1860. Within a week, Governor Sam Houston authorized Ross to raise his own company of 60 mounted volunteers to protect the settlements near Belknap from Native American attacks. Ross and his men arrived at Fort Belknap on October 17, 1860, to find the local citizens they were sworn to protect had passed a resolution asking Ross to resign his commission and leave the frontier. The citizens erroneously believed the raiding was committed by Native Americans from the reservations, and they feared Ross's friendship with those on the reservations would make him ineffective.

=== Battle of Pease River ===
In late October and November 1860, Comanches led by Peta Nocona conducted numerous raids on various settlements, culminating in the brutal killing of a pregnant woman. On hearing of these incidents, Houston sent several 25-man companies to assist Ross. A citizen's posse had tracked the raiders to their winter village along the Pease River. As the village contained at least 500 warriors and many women and children, the posse returned to the settlements to recruit additional fighters. Ross requested help from the US Army at Camp Cooper, which sent 21 troops.

Immediately after the soldiers arrived on December 11, Ross and 39 Rangers departed for the Comanche village. On December 13, they met the civilian posse, which had grown to 69 members. After several days of travel, the fast pace and poor foraging forced the civilians to stop and rest their horses. All of the US soldiers and 20 of the Rangers continued on. When they neared the village, Charles Goodnight scouted ahead. Hidden from view by a dust storm, he was able to get within 200 yd (180 m) of the village and saw signs that the tribe was preparing to move on. Realizing his own horses were too tired for a long pursuit, Ross resolved to attack immediately, before the civilians were able to rejoin the group. Ross led the Rangers down the ridge, while the soldiers circled around to cut off the Comanche retreat. These "aggressive tactics of carrying the war to the Comanche fireside...ended charges of softness in dealing with the Indians."

Seven men, women, and children were killed and around seven or more escaped. US soldiers came upon a woman who held a child over her head; the men did not shoot, but instead surrounded and stopped her. Ross admitted to a cousin of Cynthia Ann Parker that he played no hand in helping to rescue Cynthia Ann Parker and her daughter, shown in 1861. The civilian posse arrived at the battleground as the fighting finished. Although they initially congratulated Ross for winning the battle, some of them later complained that Ross had pushed ahead without them so he would not have to share the glory or the spoils of war.

When Cynthia Ann Parker was taken to Ft. Cooper, US command realized the captured woman had blue eyes. The woman could not speak English and did not remember her birth name or details of her life prior to joining the Comanche. After much questioning, she was able to provide a few details of her capture as a child. The details matched what they knew of the 1836 Fort Parker Massacre, and they summoned Colonel Isaac Parker to identify her. Several modern (non-contemporary) sources report that when Parker mentioned his kidnapped niece had been named Cynthia Ann Parker, the woman slapped or pointed at her chest and said "Me Cincee Ann." Parker never returned to the Comanche people, and "was not particularly grateful" to have been found.

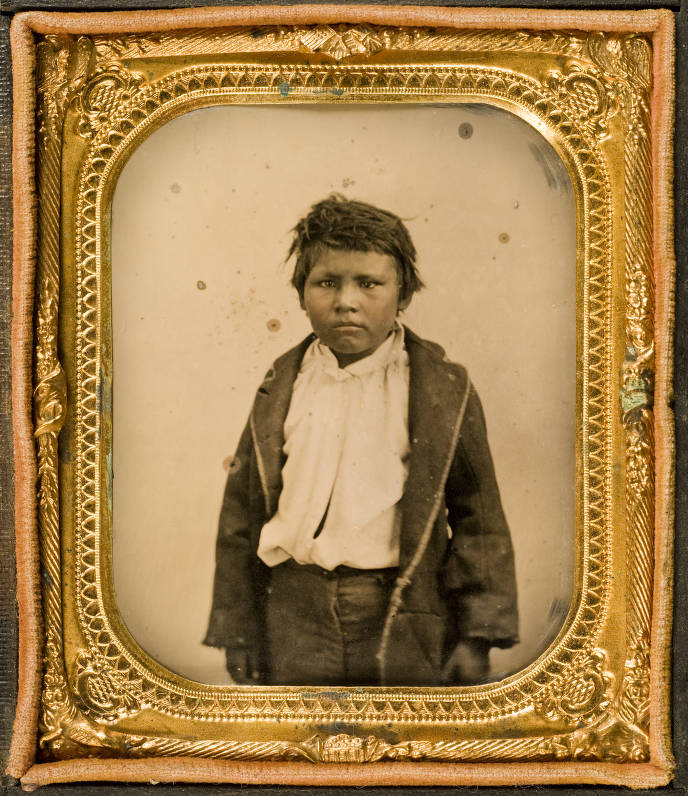
Pease Ross

In the aftermath, a nine-year-old Comanche boy found was found hiding alone in the tall grass. Ross took the child with him, naming him Pease. Though Pease was later given the choice to return to his people, he repeatedly declined and was raised by Ross.

However, some take issue with this narrative of events. After Ross's death, Nocona's son Quanah Parker maintained his father was not present at the battle, and instead died three or four years later. She identified the man Martinez shot as a Mexican captive, the personal servant of Nocona's wife, Cynthia Ann Parker. In Myth, Memory and Massacre: The Pease River Capture of Cynthia Ann Parker the authors contend most of the material in the 1886 book of James T. Deshields was falsified or exaggerated for political gain. They also offer primary documentation that Peta Nocona was not at the scene, but rather died around 1865, not in December 1860, and that only 15 Comanches were in the camp. Its authors found nine primary accounts of the incident given by Ross, each of them differing from the others.

=== Resignation ===
When Ross returned home, Houston asked him to disband the company and form a new company of 83 men, promising to send written directives soon. While Ross was in the process of supervising this reorganization, Houston appointed Captain William C. Dalrymple as his new aide-de-camp with overall command of the Texas Rangers. Dalrymple, unaware of Houston's verbal orders, castigated Ross for disbanding his company. Ross completed the reorganization of the company, then returned to Waco and resigned his commission. In his letter of resignation, effective February 1861, Ross informed Houston of his encounter with Dalrymple, and noted he did not believe a Ranger company could be effective if the captain did not report solely to the governor. Houston offered to appoint Ross as an aide-de-camp with the rank of colonel, but Ross refused.

== Civil War service ==
=== Enlistment/Commissioned Officer ===
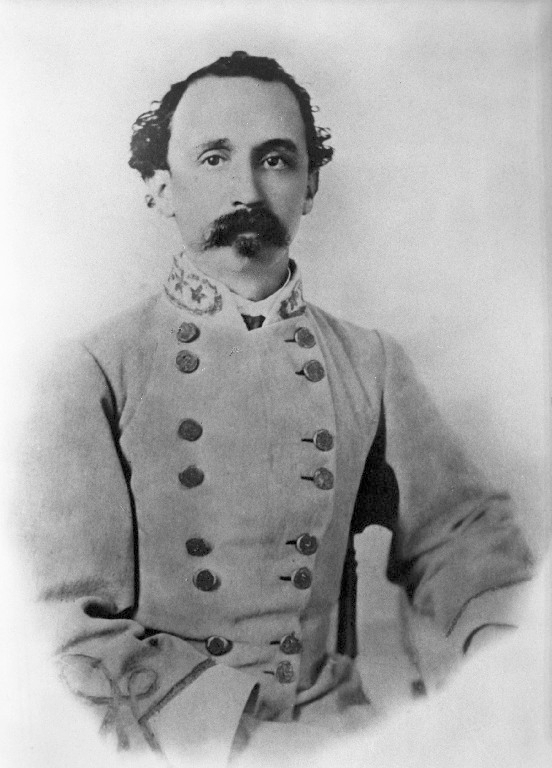
Sul Ross in uniform in the 1860s

In early 1861 after Texas voted to secede from the United States and join the Confederacy, Ross's brother Peter began recruiting men for a new military company. Ross enlisted in his brother's company as a private, and shortly afterwards, Governor Edward Clark requested he instead proceed immediately to the Indian Territory to negotiate treaties with the Five Civilized Tribes, so they would not help the Union Army. One week after his May 28 wedding to Lizzie Tinsley, Ross set out for the Indian Territory. Upon reaching the Washita Agency, he discovered the Confederate commissioners had already signed a preliminary treaty with the tribes.

Ross returned home for several months. In the middle of August, he departed, with his company, for Missouri, leaving his wife with her parents. On September 7, his group became Company G of Stone's Regiment, later known as the Sixth Texas Cavalry. The other men elected Ross as the major for the regiment. Twice in November 1861, Ross was chosen by General McCulloch, with whom he had served in the Texas Rangers, to lead a scouting force near Springfield, Missouri. Both times, Ross successfully slipped behind the Union Army lines, gathered information, and retreated before being caught. After completing the missions, he was granted a 60-day leave and returned home to visit his wife.

In early 1862, Ross returned to duty. By late February, 500 troops and he were assigned to raid the Union Army. He led the group 70 mi (110 km) behind the enemy lines, to Keetsville (now Washburn), Missouri, where they gathered intelligence, destroyed several wagonloads of commissary supplies, captured 60 horses and mules, and took 11 prisoners. The following month, the regiment was assigned to Earl Van Dorn, now a major general, with whom Ross had served during the battle at the Wichita Village. Under Van Dorn, the group suffered a defeat at the Battle of Pea Ridge; Ross attributed their loss solely to Van Dorn, and blamed him for overmarching and underfeeding his troops, and for failing to properly coordinate the plan of attack. In April, the group was sent to Des Arc, Arkansas. Because of the scarcity of forage, Ross's cavalry troop was ordered to dismount and send their horses back to Texas. The unit, now on foot, traveled to Memphis, Tennessee, arriving two weeks after the Battle of Shiloh. Ross soon caught a bad cold accompanied by a lingering fever, and was extremely ill for eight weeks. By the time he considered himself cured, his weight had dwindled to only 125 lb (57 kg).

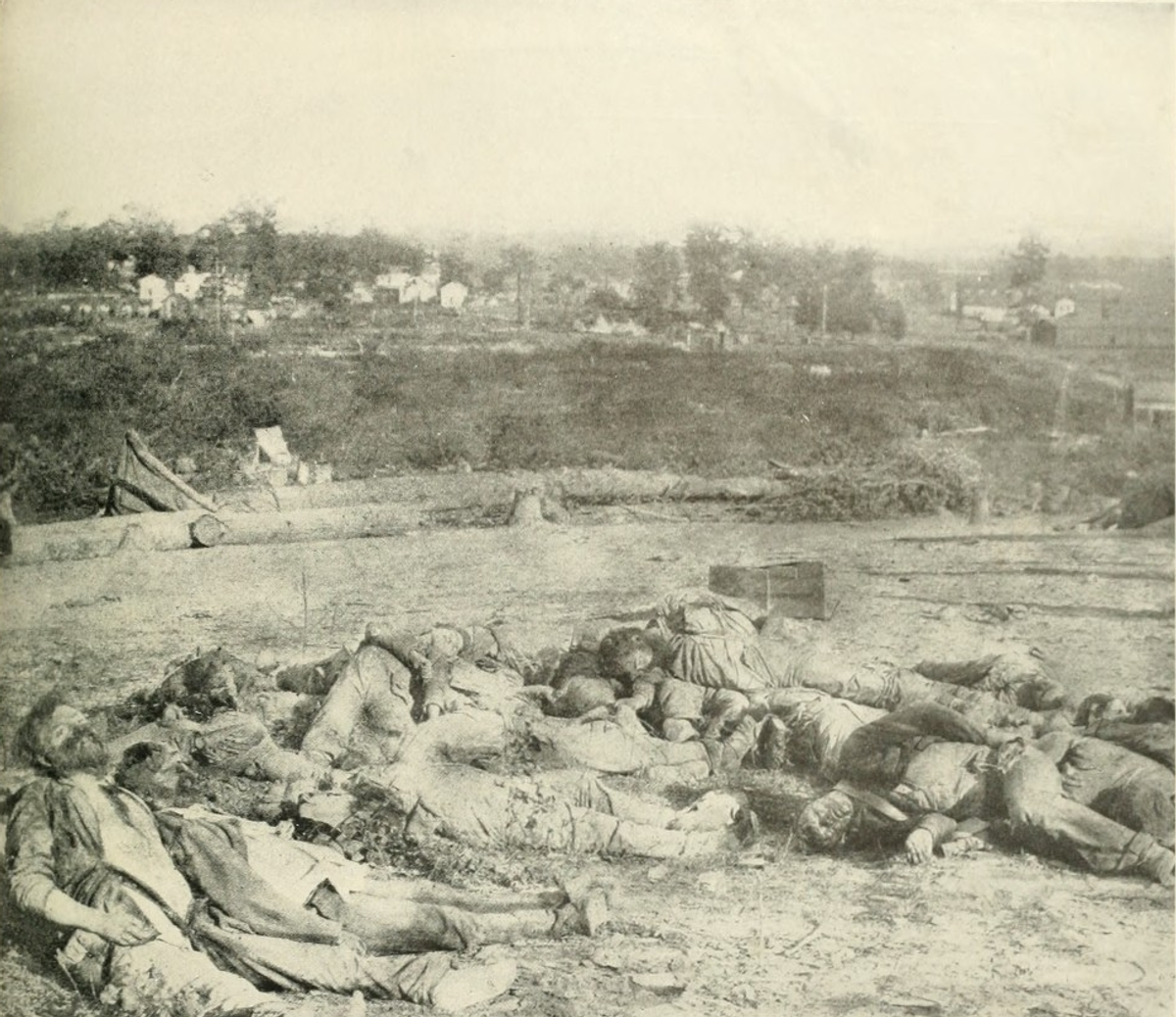
Confederate dead lay gathered at the bottom of the parapet of Battery Robinett on the day after the Battle of Corinth.

Over Ross's protests, the men of the Sixth Regiment elected him colonel in 1862. He did not want the responsibility of the position and had not wanted to embarrass a friend who wanted the job. Their brigade commander, General Charles W. Phifer, was often absent, leaving Ross in charge. Ross's actions impressed other officers, and several times during the summer of 1862, he was nominated for promotion to brigadier general. Although he was not promoted at that time, his unit was the only one of the 8–10 dismounted cavalry units in the area to be promised the return of their horses.

While still afoot, Ross and his men participated in the Battle of Corinth. Under Ross's command, his Texans twice captured Union guns at Battery Robinett. They were forced to retreat from their position each time as reinforcements failed to arrive. During the battle, Ross, who had acquired a horse, was bucked off, leading his men to believe he had been killed. He was actually unharmed. The Confederate Army retreated from the battle and found themselves facing more Union troops at Hatchie's Bridge. Ross led 700 riflemen to engage the Union troops. For three hours, his men held off 7,000 Union troops, repelling three major Union attacks.

The Sixth Cavalry's horses arrived soon after the battle, and the regiment was transferred to the cavalry brigade of Colonel William H. "Red" Jackson. Ross was permitted to take a few weeks leave in November 1862 to visit his wife, and returned to his regiment in mid-January 1863. Several months later, his unit participated in the Battle of Thompson's Station. In July, Major General Stephen D. Lee created a new brigade with Ross at the helm, consisting of Ross's regiment and Colonel Richard A. Pinson's First Mississippi Cavalry. Near the same time, Ross received word that his first child had died, possibly stillborn.

Ross fell ill again in September 1863. From September 27 through March 1864, he suffered recurring attacks of fever and chills every three days, symptomatic of tertiary malaria. Despite his illness, Ross never missed a day of duty, and on December 21, 1863, he was promoted to brigadier general, becoming the ninth-youngest general officer of the Confederate Army. Following his promotion, unit morale improved, and every one of his men re-enlisted.

In March 1864, Ross's brigade fought against African American soldiers for the first time in the Battle of Yazoo City. After bitter fighting, the Confederates were victorious. During the surrender negotiations, the Union officer accused the Texans of murdering several captured African American soldiers. Ross claimed two of his men had likewise been killed after surrendering to Union troops.

Beginning in May, the brigade endured 112 consecutive days of skirmishes, comprising 86 separate clashes with the Union forces. Though most of the skirmishes were small, by the end of the period, injuries and desertion had cut the regiment's strength by 25%. Ross was captured in late July at the Battle of Brown's Mill, but was quickly rescued by a successful Confederate cavalry counterattack.

Their last major military campaign was the Franklin-Nashville Campaign of November and December 1864. Ross and his men led the Confederate advance into Tennessee. Between the beginning of November and December 27, his men captured 550 prisoners, several hundred horses, and enough overcoats and blankets to survive the winter chill. Only 12 of Ross's men were killed, with 70 wounded and five captured.

=== Surrender ===
By the time Ross began a 90-day furlough on March 13, 1865, he had participated in 135 engagements with Union troops and his horse had been shot out from under him five times, yet he had escaped serious injury. With his leave approved, Ross hurried home to Texas to visit the wife he had not seen in two years. While at home, the Confederate Army began its surrender. He had not rejoined his regiment when it surrendered in Jackson, Mississippi, on May 14, 1865. Because he was not present at the surrender, Ross did not receive a parole protecting him from arrest. As a Confederate Army officer over the rank of colonel, Ross was also exempted from President Andrew Johnson's amnesty proclamation of May 29, 1865. To prevent his arrest and the confiscation of his property, on August 4, 1865, Ross applied for a special pardon. President Johnson personally approved Ross's application on October 22, 1866, but Ross did not receive and formally accept the pardon until July 1867.

== Farming and early public service ==
When the Civil War ended, Ross was just 26 years old. He owned 160 acres (65 ha) of farmland along the South Bosque River west of Waco, and 5.41 acres (2.19 ha) in town. For the first time, his wife and he were able to establish their own home. They expanded their family, having eight children over the next 17 years.

Despite his federal pardon for being a Confederate general, Ross was disqualified from voting and serving as a juror by the first Reconstruction Act of March 2, 1867. This act, and the Supplementary Reconstruction Act passed three weeks later, disenfranchised anyone who had held a federal or state office before supporting the Confederacy.

Reconstruction did not harm Ross's fortune, and with hard work, he soon prospered. Shortly after the war ended, he bought 20 acres (8.1 ha) of land in town from his parents for $1,500. By May 1869, he had purchased an additional 40 acres (16 ha) of farmland for $400, and the following year, his wife inherited 186 acres (75 ha) of farmland from the estate of her father. Ross continued to buy land, and by the end of 1875, he owned over 1,000 acres (400 ha) of farmland. Besides farming, Ross and his brother Peter also raised Shorthorn cattle. The two led several trail drives to New Orleans. The combined farming and ranching incomes left Ross wealthy enough to build a house in the Waco city limits and to send his children to private school.

By 1873, Reconstruction in Texas was coming to an end. In December, Ross was elected sheriff of McLennan County, "without campaigning or other solicitation". Ross promptly named his brother Peter a deputy, and within two years, they had arrested over 700 outlaws. In 1874, Ross helped establish the Sheriff's Association of Texas. After various state newspapers publicized the event, sheriffs representing 65 Texas counties met in Corsicana in August 1874. Ross became one of a committee of three assigned to draft resolutions for the convention. They asked for greater pay for sheriffs in certain circumstances, condemned the spirit of mob law, and proposed that state law be modified so arresting officers could use force if necessary to "compel the criminal to obey the mandates of the law."

Ross resigned as sheriff in 1875 and was soon elected as a delegate to the 1875 Texas Constitutional Convention. One of three members appointed to wait upon convention president-elect E.B. Pickett, Ross was also named to a committee that would determine what officers and employees were needed by the convention. He sat on many other committees, including Revenue and Taxation, the Select Committee on Frontier Affairs, the Select Committee on Education, and the Standing Committee on the Legislative Department. Of the 68 days of the convention, Ross attended 63, voted 343 times, and missed or abstained from voting only 66 times.

When the convention concluded, Ross returned home and spent the next four years focusing on his farm. In 1880, he became an accidental candidate for the Texas Senate from the 22nd District. The nominating convention deadlocked between two candidates, with neither receiving a two-thirds majority. As a compromise, one of the delegates suggested the group nominate Ross. Although no one asked Ross whether he wanted to run for office, the delegates elected him as their candidate. He agreed to the nomination to spare the trouble and expense of another convention.

Ross won the election with a large majority. His term as a Texas Senator began on January 11, 1881. Shortly after his arrival in Austin, his youngest son died. Ross returned home for a week to attend the funeral and help care for another son who was seriously ill. In the 17th Texas Legislature, he was a member of the Senate Committees on Agricultural Affairs, Contingent Expenses, Educational Affairs, Enrolled Bills, Finance, Internal Improvements, Penitentiaries, Senatorial and Representative Districts, Apportionment, State Affairs, Statistics of Industries, Public Health, and History of Texas, Stock and Stock Raising, and was the chair of the Committee on Military Affairs. Ross introduced a petition on behalf of 500 citizens of McLennan County, requesting a prohibition amendment to be placed on the next statewide ballot; the legislature did agree to place this on the next ballot.

Although the Texas Legislature typically meets once every two years, a fire destroyed the state capitol building in November 1881, and Ross was called to serve in a special session in April 1882. The session agreed to build a new capitol building. Near the end of the special session, the Senate passed a reapportionment bill, which reduced Ross's four-year term to only two years. He declined to run again.

== Governor ==
=== Election ===
As early as 1884, Ross's friends, including Victor M. Rose, the editor of the newspaper in Victoria, had encouraged Ross to run for governor. He declined and asked his friend George Clark to attend the 1884 state Democratic convention to prevent Ross from being named the gubernatorial candidate. Clark had to produce written authorization from Ross to convince the delegates to nominate someone else. Ross changed his mind in late 1885, announcing his candidacy for governor on February 25, 1886. During the campaign, he was variously accused of pandering to the Greenbackers, the Republicans, and the Knights. Ross spent no money on his campaign other than traveling expenses, but still handily won the Democratic nomination. He won the general election with 228,776 votes, compared with 65,236 for the Republican candidate and 19,186 from the Prohibitionist candidate. Much of his support came from Confederate veterans.

Ross became the 19th governor of Texas. His inauguration ball was held at the newly opened Driskill Hotel, a tradition followed by every subsequent Texas governor. Under the 1876 Texas Constitution, which he had helped write, the governor was granted the power to be commander-in-chief, to convene the legislature, to act as executor of the laws, to direct trade with other states, to grant pardons, and to veto bills. His campaign had focused on land-use reform, as most of the frontier issues now resulted from disagreements over the use of public land, especially between farmers and ranchers concerned with water rights and grazing issues. At Ross's urging, the legislature passed laws to restore the power of the land office commissioner, provide punishments for those using state lands illegally, and to catalog existing public lands.

=== Second term ===
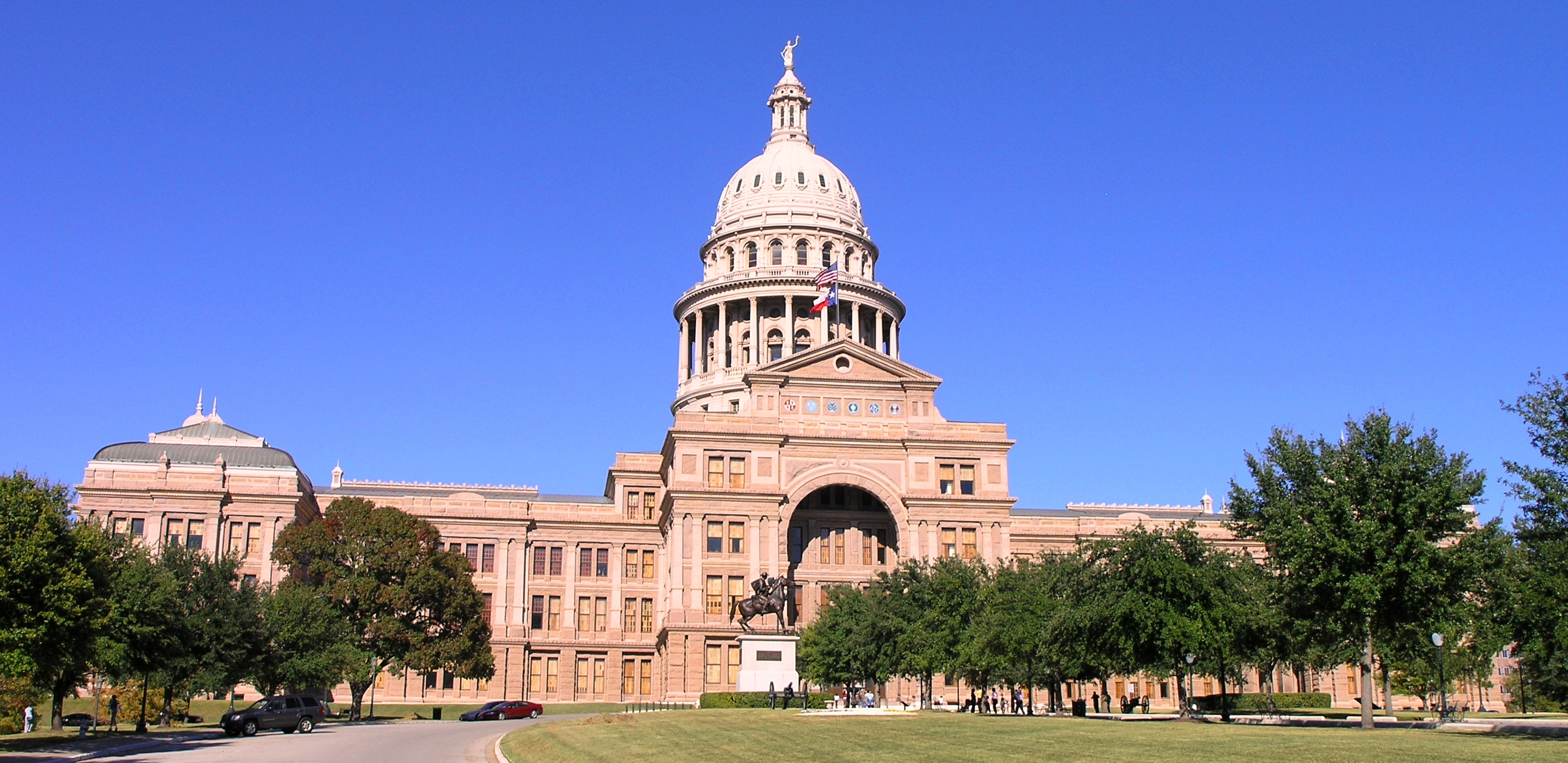
Ross presided over the dedication of the Texas State Capitol building. He also served in the legislative session that approved the building's construction.

In May 1888, Ross presided over the dedication of the new Texas State Capitol building. Later that year, Ross ran relatively unopposed for a second term. His platform included abolishing the national banking system, regulating monopolies, reducing tariffs, and allowing the railroads to regulate themselves through competition. No other Democrats placed their names in contention at the nominating convention, and the Republicans chose not to select a candidate, as they were happy with Ross's performance. His sole competition was a Prohibitionist whom Ross defeated by over 151,000 votes. In his second inaugural address, Ross, a true Jeffersonian Democrat, maintained, "a plain, simple government, with severe limitations upon delegated powers, honestly and frugally administered, as the noblest and truest outgrowth of the wisdom taught by its founders."

During his second term, Ross was forced to intervene in the Jaybird-Woodpecker War in Fort Bend County. Sheriff Jim Garvey feared armed battles would occur between the white-supremacist Democrats (the Jaybirds) and the black men who had retained political power (who, with their white supporters, were known as Woodpeckers). At Garvey's request, Ross sent two militia companies, which managed to impose a four-month peace. In August 1889, Ross sent four Texas Rangers, including Sergeant Ira Aten, to quell the unrest. Violence erupted, leaving four people dead and injuring six, including a Ranger. Aten wired Ross for help. The following morning, the Houston Light Guard arrived and instituted martial law; that evening, Ross arrived with an assistant attorney general and another militia company. Ross fired all the local civil officials and called together representatives from both factions. On his suggestion, the two groups agreed to choose a mutually acceptable sheriff to replace Garvey, who had been killed in the firefight. When they could not agree on a candidate, Ross suggested Aten; both groups finally agreed, thus halting the conflict.

In March 1890, the U.S. attorney general launched a suit in the Supreme Court against Texas to determine ownership of a disputed 1,500,000-acre (6,100 km^{2}) plot of land in Greer County. Determined to meet personally with the attorney general, Ross and his wife traveled to Washington, DC, where they visited President Benjamin Harrison at the White House. Following that visit, they traveled to New York City, where they met with former president Grover Cleveland. While in New York, Ross was extremely popular with journalists. He was interviewed by several large northeastern newspapers, which recounted in detail many of his exploits along the frontier. According to his biographer Judith Brenner, the trip and the resulting exposure for Ross, "excited much interest in Texas among easterners, an interest that would eventually bear fruit in increased investment, tourism, and immigration".

Ross declined to become the first Texas governor to run for a third term, and left office on January 20, 1891. During his four years in office, he vetoed only 10 bills, and issued 861 pardons.

=== Major legislation ===
During his time in office, Ross proposed tax reform laws intended to provide for more equitable assessments of property; at that time, people were allowed to assess their own belongings with little oversight. The legislature passed his recommendations, and approved his plan to exert more control over school funds and to require local taxation to support the public schools. He also encouraged the legislature to enact antitrust laws. These were passed March 30, 1889, a full year before the federal government enacted the Sherman Antitrust Act. His reform acts were beneficial for the state, leading Ross to become the only Texas governor to call a special session of the legislature to deal with a treasury surplus.

During his term, the legislature agreed to allow the public to vote on a state constitutional amendment for the prohibition of alcohol. Ross vehemently opposed the measure, saying, "No government ever succeeded in changing the moral convictions of its subjects by force." The amendment was defeated by over 90,000 votes.

When Ross took the governor's oath of office, Texas had only four state-owned charitable institutions—two insane asylums, an institute for the blind, and an institute for the deaf and dumb. By the time he left office, Ross had supervised the opening of a state orphan's home, a state institute for deaf, dumb, and blind black children, and a branch asylum for the insane. He also convinced the legislature to set aside 696 acres (282 ha) near Gatesville for a future open farm reformatory for juvenile offenders.

Ross was the first governor to set aside a day for civic improvements, declaring the third Friday in January to be Arbor Day, when schoolchildren should endeavor to plant trees. He also supported the legislature's efforts to purchase the Huddle portrait gallery, a collection of paintings of each governor of Texas. These paintings continue to hang in the rotunda of the Texas State Capitol.

Ross felt strongly that the state should adequately care for its veterans. During his first term, the first Confederate home in Texas was dedicated in Austin. Within two years, the facility had run out of room, so Ross served as chairman of a committee to finance a relocation to a larger facility. By August 1890, the home had collected enough money to move to a larger location.

== College president ==
=== Arrival ===
By the late 1880s, rumors abounded of "poor management, student discontent, professorial dissatisfaction, faculty factionalism, disciplinary problems, and campus scandals" at the Agricultural and Mechanical College of Texas (now Texas A&M University). The public was skeptical of the idea of scientific agriculture and the legislature declined to appropriate money for improvements to the campus because it had little confidence in the school's administrators. The board of directors decided the school, known as Texas AMC, needed to be run by an independent administrative chief rather than the faculty chairman. On July 1, 1890, the board unanimously agreed to offer the new job to the sitting governor and asked Ross to resign his office immediately. Ross agreed to consider the offer, as well as several others he had received. An unknown person informed several newspapers that Ross had been asked to become Texas AMC's president, and each of the newspapers editorialized that Ross would be a perfect fit. The college had been founded to teach military and agricultural knowledge, and Ross had demonstrated excellence in the army and as a farmer. His gubernatorial service had honed his administrative skills, and he had always expressed an interest in education.

Though Ross was concerned about the appearance of a conflict of interest, as he had appointed many of the board members who had elected him, he announced he would accept the position. As the news of his acceptance spread throughout the state, prospective students flocked to Texas AMC. Many of the men Ross had supervised during the Civil War wanted their sons to study under their former commander, and 500 students attempted to enroll at the beginning of the 1890–1891 school year. Although the facilities were only designed for 250 scholars, 316 students were admitted. When Ross officially took charge of the school on February 2, the campus had no running water, faced a housing shortage, was taught by disgruntled faculty, and many students were running wild.

=== Improvements ===
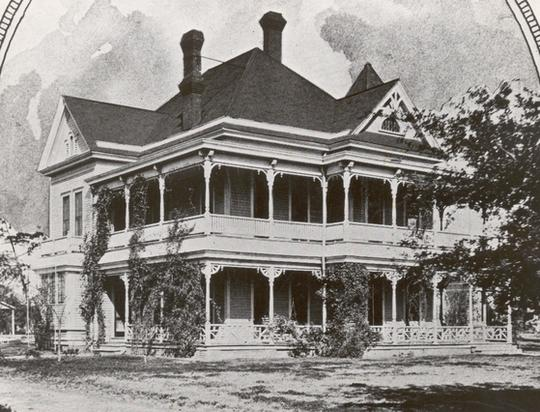
Ross was the first president of Texas AMC to live in this newly erected home.

The board of directors named Ross the treasurer of the school, and he posted a $20,000 personal bond "for the faithful performance of his duty". In the break between school years, Ross instituted a number of changes. When students returned for the 1891–1892 school year, they found a new three-story dormitory with 41 rooms (named Ross Hall), the beginning of construction on a new home for the president, and a new building to house the machine and blacksmith shops. The minimum age for enrollment decreased from 16 to 15, and Ross now personally interviewed all prospective students to determine if they should be admitted. Fees and expenses rose by $10 per session, and the number of hours required for graduation increased, including additional hours in English grammar, sciences, mathematics, and history. Additionally, Ross would now appoint the officers for the Corps of Cadets, and the name of the company of best-drilled cadets in the Corps would change to the Ross Volunteers (from Scott Volunteers). Finally, Ross enacted an official prohibition against hazing, vowing to expel any student found guilty of the practice. Although Ross professed to enjoy his new position, he wrote to several people that directing the college "made me turn gray very fast."

Enrollment continued to rise, and by the end of his tenure, Ross requested that parents first communicate with his office before sending their sons to the school. The increase in students necessitated an improvement in facilities, and from late 1891 until September 1898, the college spent over $97,000 on improvements and new buildings. This included construction of a mess hall, which could seat 500 diners at once, an infirmary, which included the first indoor toilets on campus, an artesian well, a natatorium, four faculty residences, an electric light plant, an ice works, a laundry, a cold storage room, a slaughterhouse, a gymnasium, a warehouse, and an artillery shed. Despite the expenditures on facilities, the school treasury held a surplus in 1893 and 1894. The 1894 financial report credited the surplus to Ross's leadership, and Ross ensured the money was returned to the students in the form of lower fees.

=== Impact on students ===
Ross made himself accessible to students and participated in school activities whenever possible. Those around him found him "slow to condemn but ready to encourage ... [and they] could not recall hearing Ross use profanity or seeing him visibly angry." Every month, he prepared grade sheets for each student and would often call poorly performing students into his office for a discussion of their difficulties. Under his leadership, the military aspect of the college was emphasized. However, he eliminated many practices he considered unnecessary, including marching to and from class, and he reduced the amount of guard time and the number of drills the students were expected to perform.

Although enrollment had always been limited to men, Ross favored coeducation, as he thought the male cadets "would be improved by the elevating influence of the good girls". In 1893, Ethel Hudson, the daughter of a Texas AMC professor, became the first woman to attend classes at the school and helped edit the annual yearbook. She was made an honorary member of the class of 1895. Several years later, her twin sisters became honorary members of the class of 1903, and slowly other daughters of professors were allowed to attend classes.

During Ross's seven-and-one-half-year tenure, many enduring Texas A&M traditions formed. These include the first Aggie Ring and the formation of the Aggie Band. Ross's tenure also had the school's first intercollegiate football game, played against the University of Texas. Many student organizations were founded in this time, including the Fat Man's Club, the Bowlegged Men's Club, the Glee Club (now known as the Singing Cadets), the Bicycle Club, and the College Dramatic Club. In 1893, students began publishing a monthly newspaper, The Battalion, and two years later, they began publishing an annual yearbook, known as The Olio.

=== Personal life and death ===
Ross was a Freemason and became a master mason at Waco Masonic Lodge #92. In 1947, a masonic lodge was named after him.

Ross continued to be active in veteran's organizations, and in 1893, he became the first commander of the Texas Division of the United Confederate Veterans. He was re-elected president several times and served one term as commander-in-chief of the entire United Confederate Veterans organization. During that time, a Daughters of the Confederacy chapter established in Bryan was named the L.S. Ross Chapter.

In 1894, Ross was appointed to a seat on the Railroad Commission of Texas. While he pondered whether to resign his position and accept the appointment, letters and petitions poured into his office begging him to remain at Texas AMC. He declined the appointment and remained president of the college.

Ross had always been an avid hunter, and he embarked on a hunting trip along the Navasota River with his son Neville and several family friends during Christmas vacation in 1897. While hunting, he suffered acute indigestion and a severe chill and decided to go home early while the others continued their sport. He arrived in College Station on December 30 and consulted a doctor. Ross remained in pain for several days, and in the early evening of January 3, 1898, he died at his home, aged 59 years and 3 months. Although no death certificate was filed, "evidence points to a coronary heart attack as the probable cause of death." The entire Texas AMC student body accompanied Ross's body back to Waco, where Confederate veterans in gray uniforms formed an honor guard. Several thousand people attended Ross's burial at Oakwood Cemetery. To further memorialize him, students at Texas AMC held the first Silver Taps ceremony, a tradition still followed when a current student at Texas A&M dies. Following his death, Roger Haddock Whitlock was appointed acting president of the college. Later in July, Lafayette L. Foster, who Ross had appointed as the Commissioner of Agriculture, Insurance, Statistics, and History while governor, became the next president of the college.

== Legacy ==
The morning after Ross's death, the Dallas Morning News published an editorial, quoted in several biographies of Ross:

It has been the lot of few men to be of such great service to Texas as Sul Ross. ... Throughout his life he has been closely connected with the public welfare and ... discharged every duty imposed upon him with diligence, ability, honesty and patriotism. ... He was not a brilliant chieftain in the field, nor was he masterful in the art of politics, but, better than either, he was a well-balanced, well-rounded man from whatever standpoint one might estimate him. In his public relations he exhibited sterling common sense, lofty patriotism, inflexible honesty and withal a character so exalted that he commanded at all times not only the confidence but the affection of the people. ... He leaves a name that will be honored as long as chivalry, devotion to duty and spotless integrity are standards of our civilization and an example which ought to be an inspiration to all young men of Texas who aspire to careers of public usefulness and honorable renown.

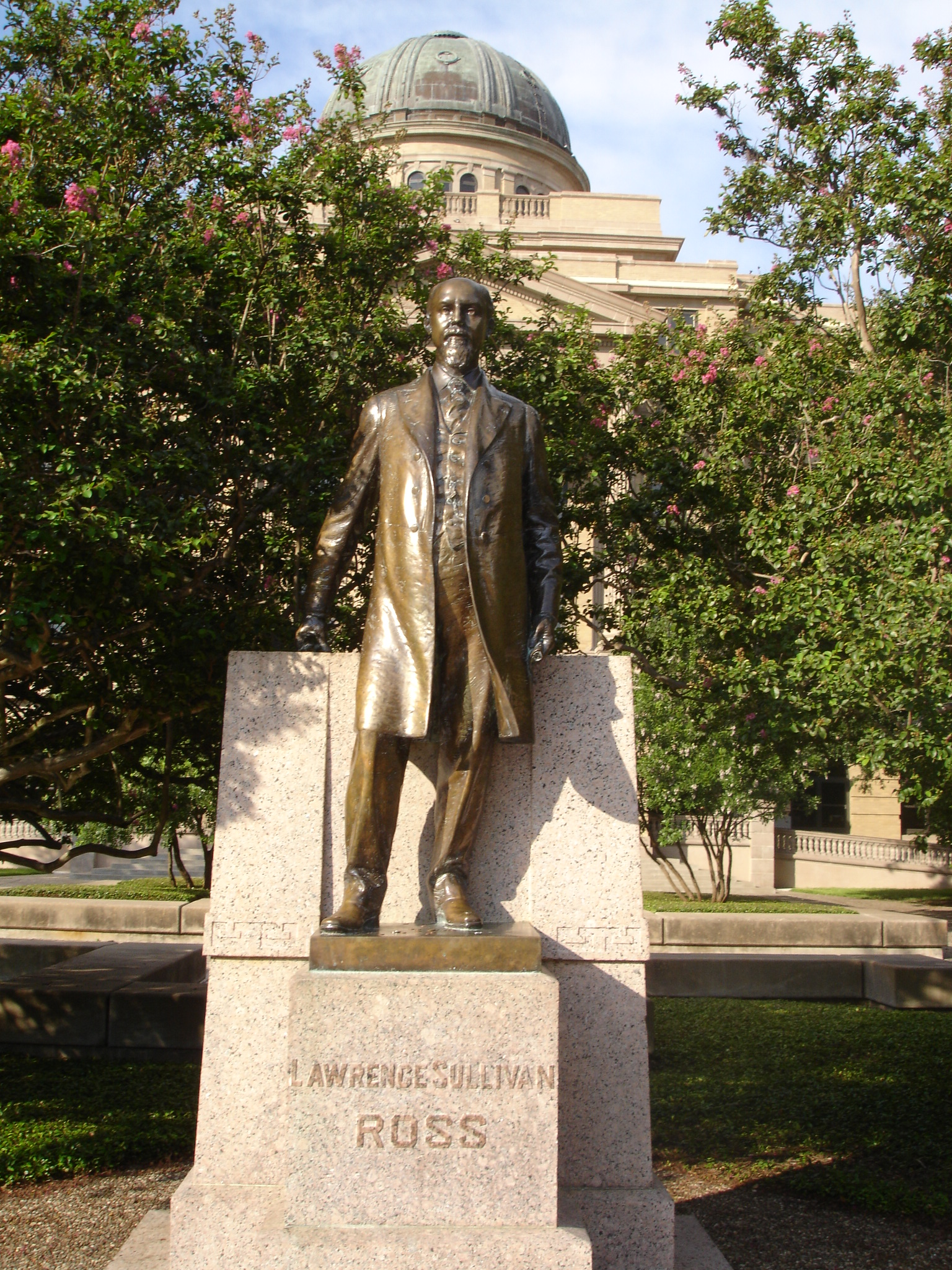
Sul Ross Statue at Texas A&M

Within weeks of Ross's death, former cadets at Texas AMC began gathering funds for a monument. In 1917, the state appropriated $10,000 for the monument, and two years later, a 10-ft (3 m) bronze statue of Ross, sculpted by Pompeo Coppini, was unveiled at the center of the Texas AMC campus. In more recent years, students began the tradition of placing pennies at the feet of statue before exams for good luck. School legend states that Ross would often tutor students, and as payment would accept only a penny for their thoughts. At exam time, his statue, located in Academic Plaza, is often covered in pennies.

At the same time they appropriated money for the statue, the legislature established the Sul Ross Normal College, now Sul Ross State University in Alpine, Texas. The college opened for classes in June 1920.

== See also ==
- List of American Civil War generals (Confederate)

Party political offices
Preceded by John Ireland	Democratic nominee for Governor of Texas; 1886, 1888	Succeeded by Jim Hogg
Texas Senate
Preceded by John W. Moore	Texas State Senator from District 22 (Waco); 1881–1883	Succeeded by John Alfred Martin
Political offices
Preceded by John Ireland	Governor of Texas; 1887–1891	Succeeded by Jim Hogg
Academic offices
Preceded by William Stuart Lorraine Bringhurst (Acting)	President of the Agricultural and Mechanical College of Texas; 1891–1898	Succeeded by Roger Haddock Whitlock (Acting)
