= 1886 Texas gubernatorial election =

- November 2, 1886
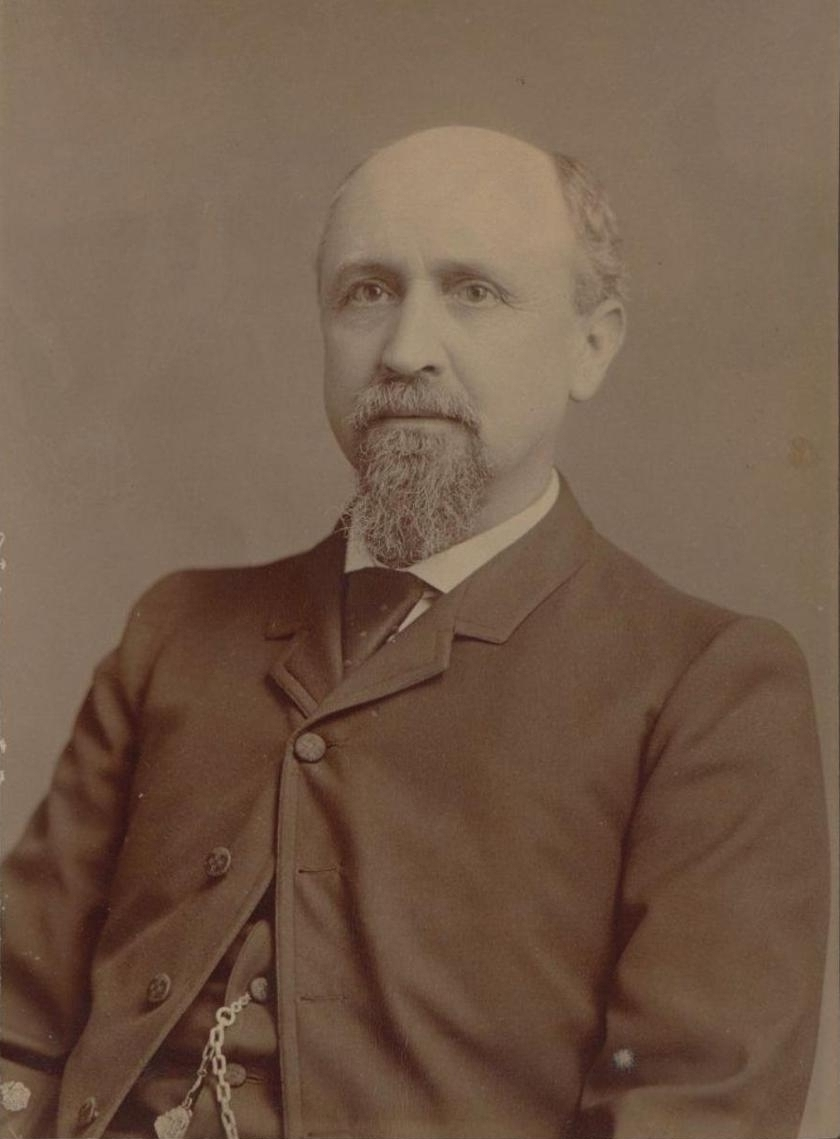

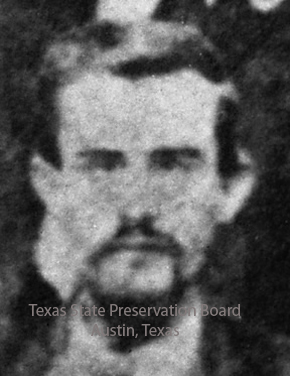

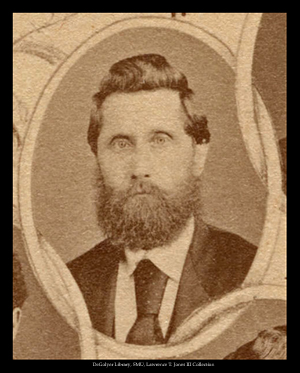
Candidate	Lawrence Sullivan Ross	Archelaus M. Cochran	Ebenezer L. Dohoney
Party	Democratic	Republican	Prohibition
Popular vote	228,776	65,236	19,186
Percentage	73.02%	20.82%	6.12%
- County results Ross: 40–50% 50–60% 60–70% 70–80% 80–90% 90–100% Cochran: 50–60% 60–70% 70–80% 80–90% Tie: 40–50% No Data/Vote
Governor before election
John Ireland
Democratic
Governor-elect
Lawrence Sullivan Ross
Democratic

The 1886 Texas gubernatorial election was held to elect the Governor of Texas. Lawrence Sullivan Ross was elected in a landslide over opposition from the Republican and Prohibition parties.

== General election ==
The incumbent governor Democrat John Ireland did not run for a third term. was a contested convention to featuring several major candidates to replace him. Comptroller William Swain and state senator Lawrence "Sul" Ross were the two front runners in the race. Former lieutenant governor Francis Marion Martin also conducted a strong campaign with the backing of more progressive groups like the Farmer's Alliance, the Knights of Labor, and prohibitionists. At the convention the progressive factions and prohibitionists failed to add desired policy positions onto the party platform and Ross secured the nomination after Swain withdrew his candidacy.

The Greenback party which had seen success in the state as one of the main opposition parties against the Democrats had lost support and failed to call a convention to nominate any candidates, effectively ending the party's existence in Texas.

The prohibition of alcohol was becoming a major political issue in the state, after failing to secure a plank in the Democratic party platform calling for a vote on the issue, the Prohibition Party nominated its first slate of statewide candidates.

During this period Texas was a part of the "Solid South" and the Democratic party was heavily favored in state elections. On November 2, 1886, Ross won by an overwhelming margin maintaining the Democratic Party's control of the state. He was sworn in as the 19th governor of Texas on January 18, 1887.

=== Candidates ===
- John T. Brackenridge, banker, lawyer, major in the CSA cavalry (Democratic) (withdrawn)
- Dr. Archelaus M. Cochran, internal revenue collector, former postmaster, former member of the Dallas City Council, former state representative, Captain in Terry's Texas Rangers (Republican)
- Ebenezer Lafayette Dohoney, Greenback candidate for the 4th Congressional district in 1882, delegate at the state constitutional convention of 1875, former state senator from Lamar County, former district attorney of the Eighth Judicial district, captain in the confederate army (Prohibition)
- DeWitt Clinton Giddings, congressman, banker, lawyer, delegate at the state constitutional conventions of 1866 and 1868, lieutenant colonel in the CSA cavalry (Democratic) (withdrawn)
- Francis Marion Martin, former lieutenant governor, delegate at the state constitutional convention of 1875, captain in the CSA Cavalry (Democratic)
- Lawrence Sullivan Ross, state senator, delegate at the state constitutional convention of 1875, former sheriff from McLennan County, brigadier general in the CSA cavalry, former Texas Ranger (Democratic)
- William Jesse Swain, Comptroller of Public Accounts, former state senator and state representative, first lieutenant in the CSA cavalry (Democratic) (withdrawn)

=== Results ===
1886 Texas gubernatorial election
Party	Candidate	Votes	%	±%
Democratic	Lawrence Sullivan Ross	228,776	73.02%	▲7.97
Republican	Archelaus M. Cochran	65,236	20.82%	▲14.7
Prohibition	Ebenezer L. Dohoney	19,186	6.12%	N/A
Write-in		102	0.03%	N/A
Total votes		313,300	100.00%	
