= John Ireland (politician) =

Governor of Texas from 1883 to 1887

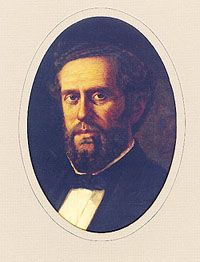

18th Governor of Texas
- In office January 16, 1883 – January 18, 1887
- Lieutenant: Francis Marion Martin; Barnett Gibbs
- Preceded by: Oran M. Roberts
- Succeeded by: Lawrence Sullivan Ross

Mayor of Seguin
- In office 1858–1858
- Preceded by: John D. Anderson
- Succeeded by: Joseph F. Johnson

Member of the Texas Senate from the 27th district
- In office January 13, 1874 – April 18, 1876
- Preceded by: Thomas H. Baker
- Succeeded by: Wells Thompson

Member of the Texas House of Representatives from the 27th district
- In office January 14, 1873 – January 13, 1874
- Preceded by: James F. McKee
- Succeeded by: Sidney Drake Jackman

Personal details
- Born: January 1, 1827 Hart County, Kentucky, U.S.
- Died: March 15, 1896 (aged 69)
- Party: Democratic

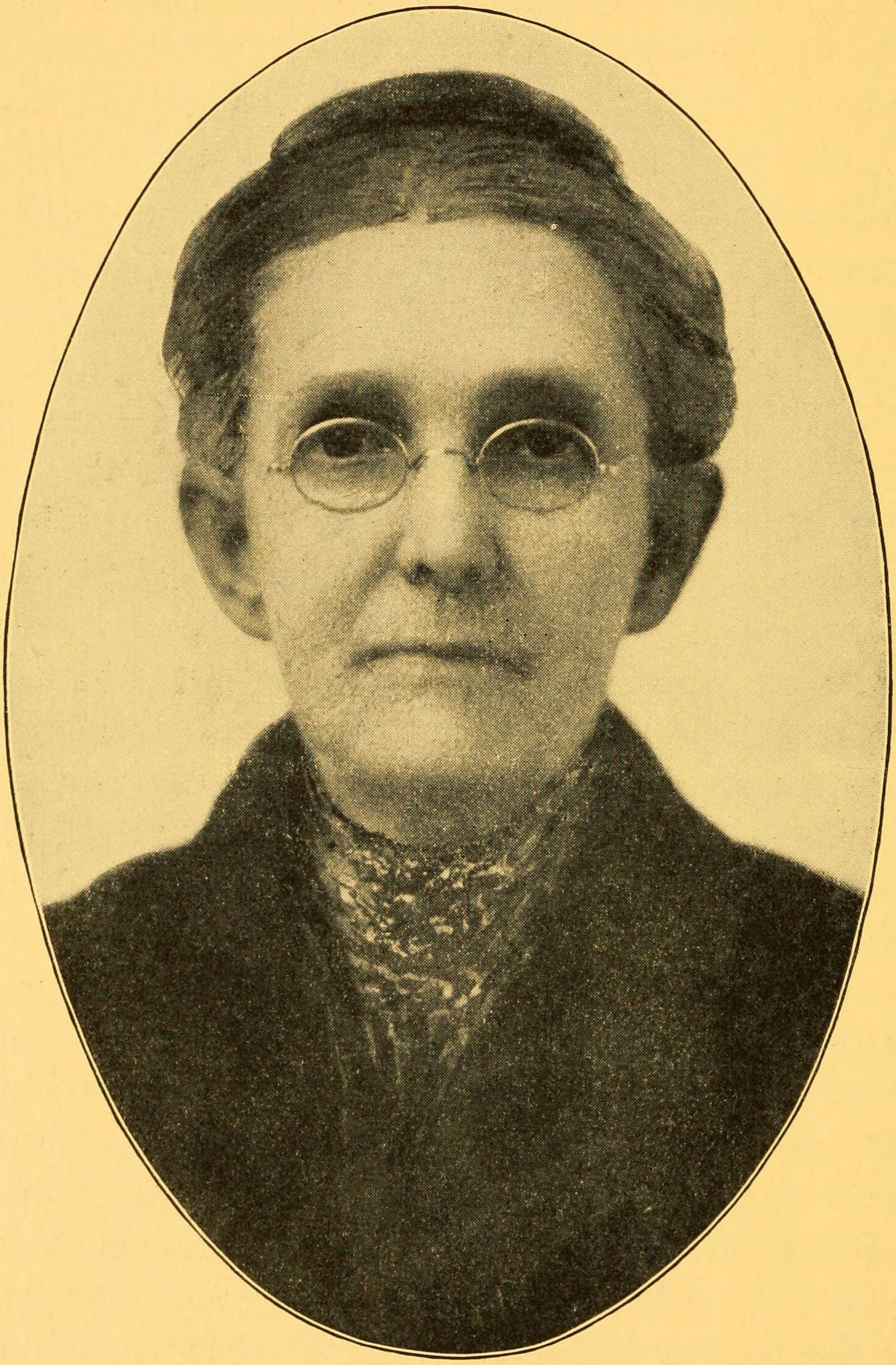
Anna Maria Penn Ireland

John Ireland (January 1, 1827 – March 15, 1896) was the 18th governor of Texas from 1883 to 1887. During Ireland's term, the University of Texas was established, and construction on the Texas State Capitol began. Ireland is credited with the selection of local pink granite as the construction material.

== Early years ==
Ireland was born on January 1, 1827 in Hart County, Kentucky to Irish immigrants Patrick Ireland and the former Rachel Newton. Although he had little formal education, when he was 18 he was appointed deputy sheriff of the county. At 24 years of age he decided to study law, and was admitted to the bar.

In 1852, Ireland moved to Texas, where he settled in Seguin and practiced law. Two years later, he married Mathilda Wicks Faircloth. She died in 1856, and the following year Ireland married Anna Maria Penn. They had three children together. Ireland was elected the mayor of Seguin in 1858.

A firm believer in slavery, Ireland campaigned for greater efforts to reclaim slaves who had run away to freedom in Mexico. He was an ardent secessionist and served as a delegate of Seguin to the 1861 Secession Convention. He enlisted in the Confederate States Army as a private and eventually worked his way through the ranks to that of lieutenant colonel.

Throughout the Civil War, Ireland served within the Texas borders, patrolling along the Rio Grande border and along the Gulf Coast, where he was stationed at the war's end in 1865.

Following the war, Ireland participated in the Reconstruction Convention of 1866 and was soon elected judge of the Seguin District. He was removed from his position the following year when Radical Republicans seized power.

== State politics ==
Ireland reentered politics in 1872, when he was elected to the Texas House of Representatives and chaired the executive committee of the Democratic party. During his time as a state legislator, Ireland backed the bill creating the University of Texas at Austin, was a proponent of low taxes, and favored regulating the railroads. In 1875, he served as an associate justice of the Texas Supreme Court. Later that year, he was a delegate to the Constitutional Convention. The new state constitution reduced the number of associate justices on the supreme court, and in 1876 Ireland lost his position.

In late 1875, Ireland decided to run for the U.S. Senate. His primary competition was the current Governor of Texas, Richard Coke. Coke's supporters accused Ireland of having been a member of the Know-Nothing party and of opposing ratification of the new constitution. Ireland lost the election. In 1878, he attempted to run for the U.S. House against incumbent Gustav Schleicher, but again failed to win the election.

In 1882, Governor Oran Roberts declined to run again, and Ireland received the Democratic nomination. His main competition was congressman and former lieutenant governor George "Wash" Jones of the Greenback party. Ireland defeated Jones by over 48,000 votes. One of his first acts as governor was to have an amendment added to the state constitution establishing an ad valorem tax. He also reversed the policy of selling public lands. Ireland's land policy led to cattle ranchers accumulating large areas of land. The ranchers soon began running barbed wire around their own land and the public lands that they used, without permission, for grazing. This practice often cut farmers and other ranchers off from water. During a large drought in early 1883, people began cutting the barbed wire, leading to violence between the ranchers and farmers. This practice soon led to the Fence Cutting War. Ireland called a special session of the legislature in 1884 that passed a law allowing the Texas Rangers to intervene in these disputes. The Rangers were able to quell some, but not all, of the violence.

The same year, Ireland won reelection for his second term as governor. He again faced congressman "Wash" Jones, this time winning by a margin of over 123,000 votes.

Construction began on the new Texas State Capitol building during Ireland's tenure. At his insistence, the building was constructed of Texas pink granite instead of imported Indiana limestone.

In 1887 Ireland attempted again to run for a U.S. Senate seat, but lost the race, ending his political career.

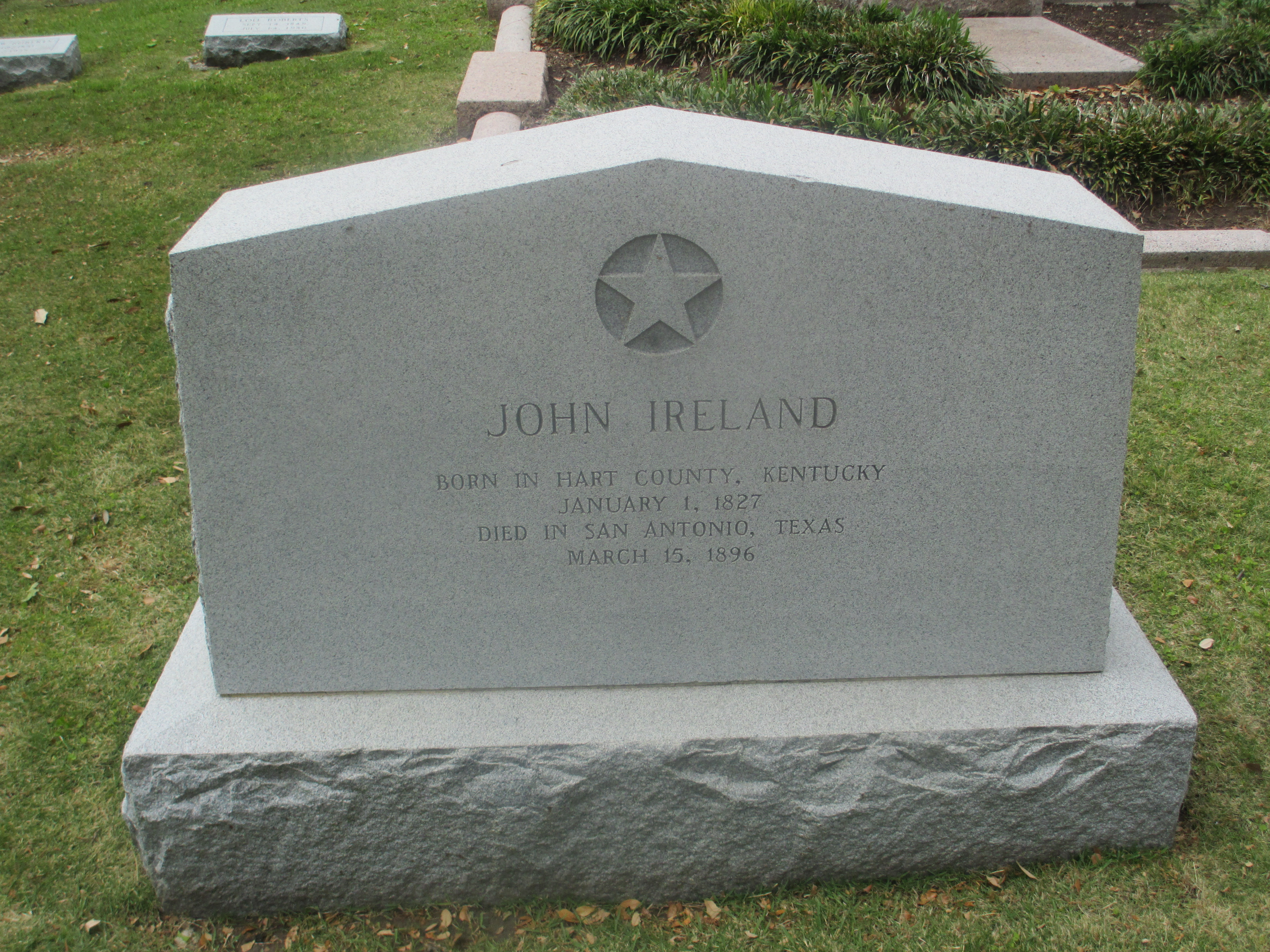
Ireland's grave at the Texas State Cemetery in Austin

== Later years ==
After retiring from politics, Ireland returned to Seguin to practice law. His profits were invested in land and railroad stocks, and during the Panic of 1893, he lost all of his holdings. He died on March 15, 1896, and is interred at the Texas State Cemetery in Austin.

The small community of Ireland, Texas in Coryell County is named after Ireland.

== Notes ==
Party political offices
Preceded by Oran Milo Roberts	Democratic nominee for Governor of Texas; 1882, 1884	Succeeded by Lawrence Sullivan Ross
Texas Senate
Preceded by Thomas H. Baker	Texas State Senator from District 27 (Seguin); 1874–1876	Succeeded by Wells Thompson
Political offices
Preceded by Oran M. Roberts	Governor of Texas; 1883–1887	Succeeded by Lawrence Sullivan Ross
