= Martin McNulty Crane =

American politician (1853–1943)

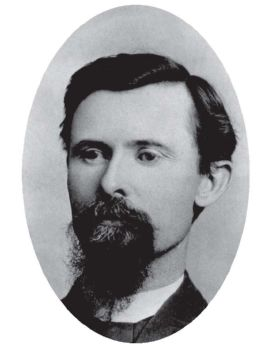

23rd Attorney General of Texas
- In office 1895–1899
- Governor: Charles A. Culberson
- Preceded by: Charles A. Culberson
- Succeeded by: Thomas Slater Smith

18th Lieutenant Governor of Texas
- In office January 17, 1893 – January 15, 1895
- Governor: Jim Hogg
- Preceded by: George C. Pendleton
- Succeeded by: George T. Jester

Member of the Texas Senate from the 21st district
- In office January 13, 1891 – January 10, 1893
- Preceded by: Samuel Crockett Upshaw
- Succeeded by: William Oscar Hutchinson

Member of the Texas House of Representatives from the 36th district
- In office January 13, 1885 – January 8, 1889
- Preceded by: Owen Brown
- Succeeded by: Samuel J. Chapman

Personal details
- Born: November 17, 1853 Grafton, West Virginia, U.S.
- Died: August 3, 1943 (aged 89) Dallas, Texas, U.S.
- Party: Democratic
- Other political affiliations: Populist
- Spouse: Eula O. Taylor (m. 1879)

Martin McNulty Crane (November 17, 1853 – August 3, 1943) was an American attorney and politician. He was a Democratic, Granger, and Populist politician in the state of Texas, and held various positions in the state government. When he was state senator, he was a prominent formulator and proponent of the Railroad Commission Law that created the Railroad Commission of Texas. During his tenure as Attorney General of Texas, Crane brought and won the first antitrust suit in the history of Texas against the Waters-Pierce Oil Company.

== Early life and education ==
The son of Martin and Mary (née McNulty) Crane, the younger Martin was born in Grafton, West Virginia. His mother died when he was aged four years. During the ensuing year before his father also died, young Martin first moved with his father to Kentucky and, then, to Tennessee. Completely orphaned by 5 years old, Martin McNulty Crane was raised by various family friends in Tennessee until at age 17 he emigrated from Tennessee to Texas, where he worked various occupations and read law. He was admitted to the Texas bar on December 25, 1877.

== Career ==
He was elected as the County Attorney for Johnson County in November 1878 and was re-elected to the same office in 1880. Crane was a member of the law firm Brown, Crane & Ramsey based in Cleburne. Politically, Crane sympathized with the beleaguered North Texas farmers. In 1884, he was elected to the Nineteenth State Legislature and supported programs put forth by the Farmer’s Alliance. He was a member of the Texas House of Representatives until 1887. In 1890, Crane was elected to the Texas Senate, representing Johnson, Hill, and Ellis counties. In 1892, he was elected Lieutenant Governor of Texas. In 1894, he resigned this office to successfully seek election as Texas Attorney General. He further distinguished himself over the next four years; by as Attorney General, successfully arguing a number of precedent-setting antitrust cases. He brought and won the first antitrust suit in Texas against the Waters-Pierce Oil Company. During his legislative, executive and prosecutorial career, he sought to curb the then unregulated powers of the railroads, oil companies and mercantile banks, which were anathema to the interests of Texas farmers. He was a staunch supporter of the reform efforts of Texas governors James S. Hogg and Charles A. Culberson. Crane resigned from the office of Attorney General in 1899 and moved to Dallas to continue his law career. He was a delegate to the 1912 Democratic National Convention. In 1917, Crane served as the chief prosecuting counsel for the successful impeachment of Texas Governor James E. Ferguson. In the 1920s, Crane headed the Dallas County Citizens League, which had been established to oppose the growing political influence of the Ku Klux Klan. Crane died in 1943 at age 88, after a short illness

== Personal life ==
Martin Crane married Eula O. Taylor on January 22, 1879. One of Crane's descendants is the indie folk singer-songwriter Martin McNulty Crane, the frontman of the band Brazos.

Political offices
Legal offices
Preceded by Charles Allen Culberson	Attorney General of Texas; 1895–1899	Succeeded by Thomas Slater Smith
Preceded by George C. Pendleton	Lieutenant Governor of Texas; 1893-1895	Succeeded by George T. Jester
Texas Senate
Preceded by Samuel Crockett Upshaw	Member of the Texas Senate from District 21; 1891–1893	Succeeded by William Oscar Hutchinson
Texas House of Representatives
Preceded by Owen Brown	Member of the Texas House of Representatives from District 36 (Cleburne); 1885–1887	Succeeded by Samuel J. Chapman
