= Political party strength in Texas =

Politics in the US state of Texas

The following table indicates the party of elected officials in the U.S. state of Texas:

- Governor
- Lieutenant Governor
- Attorney General (since 1850) (Note: Position was originally appointed, the only amendment to 1845 Constitution was approved Jan. 16, 1850 which made all the appointed offices subject to election. The change was also incorporated into all subsequent constitutions.)
- State Comptroller of Public Accounts
- State Land Commissioner (since 1850)
- State Agriculture Commissioner
- Treasurer (before 1996)

The table also indicates the historical party composition in the:

- State Legislature
  - State Senate
  - State House of Representatives
- State Railroad Commission
- State delegation to the U.S. Senate
- State delegation to the U.S. House of Representatives

For years in which a presidential election was held, the table indicates which party's nominees received the state's electoral votes.

== 1846–1890 ==
Year	Executive offices						State Legislature		United States Congress			Electoral votes
Year	Governor	Lieutenant Governor	Attorney General	Comptroller	Treasurer	Land Comm.	State Senate	State House	U.S. Senator (Class I)	U.S. Senator (Class II)	U.S. House	Electoral votes
1846	J. Pinckney Henderson (D)	Albert Clinton Horton (D)	John Woods Harris (D)	James B. Shaw (D)	James H. Raymond (D)	Thomas W. Ward (D)	D maj. (Note: Partisan affiliations for most individual members of the antebellum legislatures are not known, but the party is known to have held control for this entire period.)	D maj.	Thomas Jefferson Rusk (D)	Sam Houston (D)	2D	
1847	J. Pinckney Henderson (D)	Albert Clinton Horton (D)	John Woods Harris (D)	James B. Shaw (D)	James H. Raymond (D)	Thomas W. Ward (D)	D maj.	D maj.	Thomas Jefferson Rusk (D)	Sam Houston (D)	2D	
1848	George Tyler Wood (D)	John Alexander Greer (D)	John Woods Harris (D)	James B. Shaw (D)	James H. Raymond (D)	Thomas W. Ward (D)	D maj.	D maj.	Thomas Jefferson Rusk (D)	Sam Houston (D)	2D	Cass/ Butler (D) ✗
1848	George Tyler Wood (D)	John Alexander Greer (D)	John Woods Harris (D)	James B. Shaw (D)	James H. Raymond (D)	George W. Smyth (D)	D maj.	D maj.	Thomas Jefferson Rusk (D)	Sam Houston (D)	2D	Cass/ Butler (D) ✗
1849	George Tyler Wood (D)	John Alexander Greer (D)	John Woods Harris (D)	James B. Shaw (D)	James H. Raymond (D)	George W. Smyth (D)	D maj.	D maj.	Thomas Jefferson Rusk (D)	Sam Houston (D)	2D	Cass/ Butler (D) ✗
1849	George Tyler Wood (D)	John Alexander Greer (D)	Henry Percy Brewster (D)	James B. Shaw (D)	James H. Raymond (D)	George W. Smyth (D)	D maj.	D maj.	Thomas Jefferson Rusk (D)	Sam Houston (D)	2D	Cass/ Butler (D) ✗
1850	Peter Hansborough Bell (D) (Note: Resigned to take an elected seat in the United States House of Representatives.)	John Alexander Greer (D)	Henry Percy Brewster (D)	James B. Shaw (D)	James H. Raymond (D)	George W. Smyth (D)	D maj.	D maj.	Thomas Jefferson Rusk (D)	Sam Houston (D)	2D	Cass/ Butler (D) ✗
1850	Peter Hansborough Bell (D)	John Alexander Greer (D)	Andrew Jackson Hamilton (D)	James B. Shaw (D)	James H. Raymond (D)	George W. Smyth (D)	D maj.	D maj.	Thomas Jefferson Rusk (D)	Sam Houston (D)	2D	Cass/ Butler (D) ✗
1851	Peter Hansborough Bell (D)	John Alexander Greer (D)	Ebenezer Allen (D)	James B. Shaw (D)	James H. Raymond (D)	George W. Smyth (D)	D maj.	D maj.	Thomas Jefferson Rusk (D)	Sam Houston (D)	2D	Cass/ Butler (D) ✗
1852	Peter Hansborough Bell (D)	James W. Henderson (D)	Ebenezer Allen (D)	James B. Shaw (D)	James H. Raymond (D)	Stephen Crosby (D)	D maj.	D maj.	Thomas Jefferson Rusk (D)	Sam Houston (D)	2D	Pierce/ King (D) ✓
1853	Peter Hansborough Bell (D)	James W. Henderson (D)	Ebenezer Allen (D)	James B. Shaw (D)	James H. Raymond (D)	Stephen Crosby (D)	D maj.	D maj.	Thomas Jefferson Rusk (D)	Sam Houston (D)	2D	Pierce/ King (D) ✓
1853	James W. Henderson (D) (Note: As lieutenant governor, filled unexpired term.)	vacant	Ebenezer Allen (D)	James B. Shaw (D)	James H. Raymond (D)	Stephen Crosby (D)	D maj.	D maj.	Thomas Jefferson Rusk (D)	Sam Houston (D)	2D	Pierce/ King (D) ✓
1854	Elisha M. Pease (D)	David C. Dickson (D)	Thomas J. Jennings (D)	James B. Shaw (D)	James H. Raymond (D)	Stephen Crosby (D)	D maj.	D maj.	Thomas Jefferson Rusk (D)	Sam Houston (D)	2D	Pierce/ King (D) ✓
1855	Elisha M. Pease (D)	David C. Dickson (D)	Thomas J. Jennings (D)	James B. Shaw (D)	James H. Raymond (D)	Stephen Crosby (D)	D maj.	D maj.	Thomas Jefferson Rusk (D)	Sam Houston (D)	1D, 1KN	Pierce/ King (D) ✓
1856	Elisha M. Pease (D)	Hardin Richard Runnels (D)	James Willie (D)	James B. Shaw (D)	James H. Raymond (D)	Stephen Crosby (KN)	20D, 9KN, 4?	60D, 30KN	Thomas Jefferson Rusk (D)	Sam Houston (D)	1D, 1KN	Buchanan/ Breckinridge (D) ✓
1857	Elisha M. Pease (D)	Hardin Richard Runnels (D)	James Willie (D)	James B. Shaw (D)	James H. Raymond (D)	Stephen Crosby (KN)	20D, 9KN, 4?	60D, 30KN	Thomas Jefferson Rusk (D)	Sam Houston (D)	2D	Buchanan/ Breckinridge (D) ✓
1858	Hardin Richard Runnels (D)	Francis Lubbock (D)	Malcolm D. Graham (D)	James B. Shaw (D)	James H. Raymond (D)	Francis M. White (D)	27D, 6KN	81D, 9KN	J. Pinckney Henderson (D)	Sam Houston (D)	2D	Buchanan/ Breckinridge (D) ✓
1859	Hardin Richard Runnels (D)	Francis Lubbock (D)	Malcolm D. Graham (D)	James B. Shaw (D)	Cyrus H. Randolph (D)	Francis M. White (D)	27D, 6KN	81D, 9KN	Matthias Ward (D)	John Hemphill (D)	2D	Buchanan/ Breckinridge (D) ✓
1860	Sam Houston (CU) (Note: Evicted from office due to his refusal to swear an oath to the Confederate States of America.)	Edward Clark (D)	George M. Flournoy (D)	Clement R. Johns (D)	Cyrus H. Randolph (D)	Francis M. White (D)	D maj.	D maj.	Louis Wigfall (D)	John Hemphill (D)	2D	Breckinridge/ Lane (SD) ✗
1861	Sam Houston (CU)	Edward Clark (D)	George M. Flournoy (D)	Clement R. Johns (D)	Cyrus H. Randolph (D)	Francis M. White (D)	D maj.	D maj.	Louis Wigfall (D)	John Hemphill (D)	2D	Breckinridge/ Lane (SD) ✗
1861	Edward Clark (D)	vacant	George M. Flournoy (D)	Clement R. Johns (D)	Cyrus H. Randolph (D)	Francis M. White (D)	D maj.	D maj.	Expelled following Texas's secession from the U.S.			Breckinridge/ Lane (SD) ✗
1862	Francis Lubbock (D)	John McClannahan Crockett (D)	Nathan G. Shelley (D)	Clement R. Johns (D)	Cyrus H. Randolph (D)	Stephen Crosby (D)	D maj.	D maj.	American Civil War/no delegations seated			Breckinridge/ Lane (SD) ✗
1863	Francis Lubbock (D)	John McClannahan Crockett (D)	Nathan G. Shelley (D)	Clement R. Johns (D)	Cyrus H. Randolph (D)	Stephen Crosby (D)	D maj.	D maj.	American Civil War/no delegations seated			Breckinridge/ Lane (SD) ✗
1864	Pendleton Murrah (D) (Note: Fled Austin as it fell to Union forces.)	Fletcher Stockdale (D)	Benjamin E. Tarver (D)	Willis L. Robards (D)	Cyrus H. Randolph (D)	Stephen Crosby (D)	D maj.	D maj.	American Civil War/no delegations seated			no electors counted
1865	Pendleton Murrah (D)	Fletcher Stockdale (D)	Benjamin E. Tarver (D)	Willis L. Robards (D)	Cyrus H. Randolph (D)	Stephen Crosby (D)	D maj.	D maj.	American Civil War/no delegations seated			no electors counted
1865	Fletcher Stockdale (D)	vacant	Benjamin E. Tarver (D)	Willis L. Robards (D)	Cyrus H. Randolph (D)	Stephen Crosby (D)	D maj.	D maj.	American Civil War/no delegations seated			no electors counted
1865	Andrew Jackson Hamilton (DM) (Note: Provisional military governor.)	vacant	William Alexander (U)	Willis L. Robards (D)	Samuel Harris (D)	Stephen Crosby (D)	D maj.	D maj.	Reconstruction/no delegations seated			no electors counted
1866	James W. Throckmorton (D) (Note: Was removed from office by General Philip Sheridan, commander of the Fifth Military District during Reconstruction.)	George Washington Jones (D)	William M. Walton (D)	Albert H. Latimer (R)	W. M. Royston (D)	Francis M. White (D)	D maj.	D maj.	Reconstruction/no delegations seated			no electors counted
1867	James W. Throckmorton (D)	George Washington Jones (D)	William Alexander (U)	Willis L. Robards (D)	W. M. Royston (D)	Stephen Crosby (D)	Military government		Reconstruction/no delegations seated			no electors counted
1867	Elisha M. Pease (R) (Note: Resigned due to disagreements with General Joseph J. Reynolds.)	vacant (Note: The office remained vacant until the 14th Legislature in 1874.)	William Alexander (U)	Willis L. Robards (D)	John T. Allan (R)	Stephen Crosby (D)	Military government		Reconstruction/no delegations seated			no electors counted
1867	Elisha M. Pease (R)	vacant	Ezekiel B. Turner (U)	Willis L. Robards (D)	John T. Allan (R)	Stephen Crosby (D)	Military government		Reconstruction/no delegations seated			no electors counted
1867	Elisha M. Pease (R)	vacant	Ezekiel B. Turner (U)	Morgan C. Hamilton (R)	John T. Allan (R)	Joseph Spence (R)	Military government		Reconstruction/no delegations seated			no electors counted
1868	Elisha M. Pease (R)	vacant	Ezekiel B. Turner (U)	Morgan C. Hamilton (R)	John T. Allan (R)	Joseph Spence (R)	Military government		Reconstruction/no delegations seated			no electors counted
1869	Elisha M. Pease (R)	vacant	Ezekiel B. Turner (U)	Albert A. Bledsoe (R)	George W. Honey (R)	Joseph Spence (R)	Military government		Reconstruction/no delegations seated			no electors counted
1870	Edmund J. Davis (R) (Note: Elected in a special election held under military direction.)	J. W. Flanagan (R) (Note: Elected lieutenant governor in 1869 but was not inaugurated. He presided over the provisional session but left office after being elected to the United States Senate.)	William Alexander (R)	Albert A. Bledsoe (R)	George W. Honey (R)	Jacob Kuechler (R)	19R, 9D, 2I (Note: Conservative Independents Samuel Evans and Edward Thomas Broughton caucused with the Democrats and are listed as Democrats by some sources.)	54R, 36D	Reconstruction/no delegations seated			no electors counted
1870	Edmund J. Davis (R)	Donald Campbell (R) (Note: As president pro tempore of the state Senate, served as lieutenant governor ex officio while the office remained vacant.)	William Alexander (R)	Albert A. Bledsoe (R)	George W. Honey (R)	Jacob Kuechler (R)	19R, 9D, 2I	54R, 36D	J. W. Flanagan (R)	Morgan C. Hamilton (R)	3R, 1D	no electors counted
1871	Edmund J. Davis (R)	Webster Flanagan (R)	William Alexander (R)	Albert A. Bledsoe (R)	George W. Honey (R)	Jacob Kuechler (R)	18R, 10D, 2I (Note: Democrat James Eldrage Dillard won a special election to succeed Republican Mijamin Priest, who resigned after being declared ineligible by the military government.)	54R, 36D	J. W. Flanagan (R)	Morgan C. Hamilton (R)	3D, 1R	no electors counted
1872	Edmund J. Davis (R)	Albert Jennings Fountain (R)	William Alexander (R)	Albert A. Bledsoe (R)	George W. Honey (R)	Jacob Kuechler (R)	18R, 10D, 2I	54R, 36D	J. W. Flanagan (R)	Morgan C. Hamilton (R)	4D	Hendricks/ Brown (D) ✗
1873	Edmund J. Davis (R)	E. B. Pickett (D)	William Alexander (R)	Albert A. Bledsoe (R)	B. Graham (R)	Jacob Kuechler (R)	15D, 13R, 2I	74D, 16R	J. W. Flanagan (R)	Morgan C. Hamilton (LR)	6D	Hendricks/ Brown (D) ✗
1874	Richard Coke (D) (Note: Resigned to take an elected seat in the United States Senate.)	Richard B. Hubbard (D)	George Clark (D)	Stephen Heard Darden (D)	Andrew Jackson Dorn (D)	J. J. Gross (D)	26D, 3R, 1I (Note: Democrat Seth Shepard won a special election to fill the seat won by Republican T.G. Davidson, who refused to qualify after being elected in 1873. Independent Hamilton Ledbetter is listed as a Republican by some sources.)	79D, 11R	J. W. Flanagan (R)	Morgan C. Hamilton (LR)	6D	Hendricks/ Brown (D) ✗
1875	Richard Coke (D)	Richard B. Hubbard (D)	George Clark (D)	Stephen Heard Darden (D)	Andrew Jackson Dorn (D)	J. J. Gross (D)	25D, 3R, 2I (Note: Independent Newton S. Craven won a special election to fill the seat held by Democrat William H. Trolinger, who resigned.)	79D, 11R	Samuel B. Maxey (D)	Morgan C. Hamilton (R)	6D	Hendricks/ Brown (D) ✗
1876	Richard Coke (D)	Richard B. Hubbard (D)	Hannibal Boone (D)	Stephen Heard Darden (D)	Andrew Jackson Dorn (D)	J. J. Gross (D)	27D, 3R, 1I	81D, 6R, 6I	Samuel B. Maxey (D)	Morgan C. Hamilton (R)	6D	Tilden/ Hendricks (D) ✗
1877	Richard B. Hubbard (D)	vacant	Hannibal Boone (D)	Stephen Heard Darden (D)	Andrew Jackson Dorn (D)	J. J. Gross (D)	27D, 3R, 1I	81D, 6R, 6I	Samuel B. Maxey (D)	Richard Coke (D)	6D	Tilden/ Hendricks (D) ✗
1878	Richard B. Hubbard (D)	vacant	Hannibal Boone (D)	Stephen Heard Darden (D)	Andrew Jackson Dorn (D)	William C. Walsh (D)	27D, 3R, 1I	81D, 6R, 6I	Samuel B. Maxey (D)	Richard Coke (D)	6D	Tilden/ Hendricks (D) ✗
1879	Oran Milo Roberts (D)	Joseph D. Sayers (D)	George McCormick (D)	Stephen Heard Darden (D)	Francis Lubbock (D)	William C. Walsh (D)	26D, 4R, 1G	74D, 10G, 9R	Samuel B. Maxey (D)	Richard Coke (D)	5D, 1GB	Tilden/ Hendricks (D) ✗
1880	Oran Milo Roberts (D)	Joseph D. Sayers (D)	George McCormick (D)	William M. Brown (D)	Francis Lubbock (D)	William C. Walsh (D)	28D, 2R, 1G (Note: Republicans gained two seats through special elections)	74D, 10G, 9R	Samuel B. Maxey (D)	Richard Coke (D)	5D, 1GB	Hancock/ English (D) ✗
1881	Oran Milo Roberts (D)	Leonidas J. Storey (D)	James H. McLeary (D)	William M. Brown (D)	Francis Lubbock (D)	William C. Walsh (D)	29D, 1R, 1G	82D, 8R, 3G	Samuel B. Maxey (D)	Richard Coke (D)	5D, 1GB	Hancock/ English (D) ✗
1882	Oran Milo Roberts (D)	Leonidas J. Storey (D)	James H. McLeary (D)	William M. Brown (D)	Francis Lubbock (D)	William C. Walsh (D)	29D, 1R, 1G	82D, 8R, 3G	Samuel B. Maxey (D)	Richard Coke (D)	5D, 1GB	Hancock/ English (D) ✗
1883	John Ireland (D)	Francis Marion Martin (D)	John D. Templeton (D)	William Jesse Swain (D)	Francis Lubbock (D)	William C. Walsh (D)	30D, 1I	96D, 7I, 3R	Samuel B. Maxey (D)	Richard Coke (D)	10D, 1I	Hancock/ English (D) ✗
1884	John Ireland (D)	Francis Marion Martin (D)	John D. Templeton (D)	William Jesse Swain (D)	Francis Lubbock (D)	William C. Walsh (D)	30D, 1I	96D, 7I, 3R	Samuel B. Maxey (D)	Richard Coke (D)	10D, 1I	Cleveland/ Hendricks (D) ✓
1885	John Ireland (D)	Barnett Gibbs (D)	John D. Templeton (D)	William Jesse Swain (D)	Francis Lubbock (D)	William C. Walsh (D)	30D, 1R (Note: Some sources list three Democratic senators as independents from 1885–1887)	103D, 3R	Samuel B. Maxey (D)	Richard Coke (D)	11D	Cleveland/ Hendricks (D) ✓
1886	John Ireland (D)	Barnett Gibbs (D)	John D. Templeton (D)	William Jesse Swain (D)	Francis Lubbock (D)	William C. Walsh (D)	30D, 1R	103D, 3R	Samuel B. Maxey (D)	Richard Coke (D)	11D	Cleveland/ Hendricks (D) ✓
1887	Lawrence Sullivan Ross (D)	Thomas B. Wheeler (D)	Jim Hogg (D)	John D. McCall (D)	Francis Lubbock (D)	R. M. Hall (D)	30D, 1R	103D, 5R, 1Pop	John H. Reagan (D)	Richard Coke (D)	11D	Cleveland/ Hendricks (D) ✓
1888	Lawrence Sullivan Ross (D)	Thomas B. Wheeler (D)	Jim Hogg (D)	John D. McCall (D)	Francis Lubbock (D)	R. M. Hall (D)	30D, 1R	103D, 5R, 1Pop	John H. Reagan (D)	Richard Coke (D)	11D	Cleveland/ Thurman (D) ✗
1889	Lawrence Sullivan Ross (D)	Thomas B. Wheeler (D)	Jim Hogg (D)	John D. McCall (D)	Francis Lubbock (D)	R. M. Hall (D)	31D	102D, 3R, 1I	John H. Reagan (D)	Richard Coke (D)	11D	Cleveland/ Thurman (D) ✗
1890	Lawrence Sullivan Ross (D)	Thomas B. Wheeler (D)	Jim Hogg (D)	John D. McCall (D)	Francis Lubbock (D)	R. M. Hall (D)	31D	102D, 3R, 1I	John H. Reagan (D)	Richard Coke (D)	11D	Cleveland/ Thurman (D) ✗

== 1891–1998 ==
Year	Executive offices							State Legislature		R. R. Comm.	United States Congress			Electoral votes
Year	Governor	Lieutenant Governor	Attorney General	Comptroller	Treasurer	Land Comm.	Ag. Comm.	Senate	House	R. R. Comm.	U.S. Senator (Class I)	U.S. Senator (Class II)	U.S. House	Electoral votes
1891	Jim Hogg (D)	George C. Pendleton (D)	Charles A. Culberson (D)	John D. McCall (D)	William B. Wortham (D)	William L. McGaughey (D)	Lafayette L. Foster (D) (Note: Commissioner of Agriculture, Insurance, Statistics & History. Governor Hogg appointed Foster to the First Railroad Commission of Texas in May.)	31D	104D, 2R	3D	Horace Chilton (D)	Richard Coke (D)	11D	
1892	Jim Hogg (D)	George C. Pendleton (D)	Charles A. Culberson (D)	John D. McCall (D)	William B. Wortham (D)	William L. McGaughey (D)	no such office	31D	104D, 2R	3D	Roger Q. Mills (D)	Richard Coke (D)	11D	Cleveland/ Stevenson (D) ✓
1893	Jim Hogg (D)	Martin McNulty Crane (D)	Charles A. Culberson (D)	John D. McCall (D)	William B. Wortham (D)	William L. McGaughey (D)	no such office	30D, 1Pop	119D, 8Pop, 1R	3D	Roger Q. Mills (D)	Richard Coke (D)	13D	Cleveland/ Stevenson (D) ✓
1894	Jim Hogg (D)	Martin McNulty Crane (D)	Charles A. Culberson (D)	John D. McCall (D)	William B. Wortham (D)	William L. McGaughey (D)	no such office	30D, 1Pop	119D, 8Pop, 1R	3D	Roger Q. Mills (D)	Richard Coke (D)	13D	Cleveland/ Stevenson (D) ✓
1895	Charles A. Culberson (D)	George Taylor Jester (D)	Martin McNulty Crane (D)	Richard W. Finley (D)	William B. Wortham (D)	Andrew Jackson Baker (D)	no such office	29D, 2Pop	101D, 22Pop, 4R, 1I (Note: Republican Arthur C. Tompkins won an election contest against Democrat William Joseph on February 15, 1895. Independent Frank Brooks was sworn in on April 16, 1895 after being elected to succeed Democrat Robert Harrell, who died.)	3D	Roger Q. Mills (D)	Horace Chilton (D)	12D, 1R	Cleveland/ Stevenson (D) ✓
1896	Charles A. Culberson (D)	George Taylor Jester (D)	Martin McNulty Crane (D)	Richard W. Finley (D)	William B. Wortham (D)	Andrew Jackson Baker (D)	no such office	29D, 2Pop	101D, 22Pop, 4R, 1I	3D	Roger Q. Mills (D)	Horace Chilton (D)	12D, 1R	Bryan/ Sewall (D) ✗
1897	Charles A. Culberson (D)	George Taylor Jester (D)	Martin McNulty Crane (D)	Richard W. Finley (D)	William B. Wortham (D)	Andrew Jackson Baker (D)	no such office	28D, 2Pop, 1R	120D, 6Pop, 2R	3D	Roger Q. Mills (D)	Horace Chilton (D)	12D, 1R	Bryan/ Sewall (D) ✗
1898	Charles A. Culberson (D)	George Taylor Jester (D)	Thomas Slater Smith (D)	Richard W. Finley (D)	William B. Wortham (D)	Andrew Jackson Baker (D)	no such office	28D, 2Pop, 1R	120D, 6Pop, 2R	3D	Roger Q. Mills (D)	Horace Chilton (D)	12D, 1R	Bryan/ Sewall (D) ✗
1899	Joseph D. Sayers (D)	James Browning (D)	Thomas Slater Smith (D)	Richard W. Finley (D)	John W. Robbins (D)	Charles Rogan (D)	no such office	30D, 1R	118D, 9Pop, 1R	3D	Charles A. Culberson (D)	Horace Chilton (D)	12D, 1R	Bryan/ Sewall (D) ✗
1900	Joseph D. Sayers (D)	James Browning (D)	Thomas Slater Smith (D)	Richard W. Finley (D)	John W. Robbins (D)	Charles Rogan (D)	no such office	30D, 1R	118D, 9Pop, 1R	3D	Charles A. Culberson (D)	Horace Chilton (D)	12D, 1R	Bryan/ Stevenson (D) ✗
1901	Joseph D. Sayers (D)	James Browning (D)	Charles K. Bell (D)	Robert M. Love (D) (Note: Shot and killed in office by a former employee.)	John W. Robbins (D)	Charles Rogan (D)	no such office	31D	126D, 1Pop, 1IR	3D	Charles A. Culberson (D)	Joseph W. Bailey (D)	13D	Bryan/ Stevenson (D) ✗
1902	Joseph D. Sayers (D)	James Browning (D)	Charles K. Bell (D)	Robert M. Love (D)	John W. Robbins (D)	Charles Rogan (D)	no such office	31D	126D, 1Pop, 1IR	3D	Charles A. Culberson (D)	Joseph W. Bailey (D)	13D	Bryan/ Stevenson (D) ✗
1903	S. W. T. Lanham (D)	George D. Neal (D)	Charles K. Bell (D)	J. W. Stephen (D) (Note: Appointed by Governor upon the death of his predecessor.)	John W. Robbins (D)	John J. Terrell (D)	no such office	31D	130D, 1R, 1Pop, 1IR	3D	Charles A. Culberson (D)	Joseph W. Bailey (D)	16D	Bryan/ Stevenson (D) ✗
1904	S. W. T. Lanham (D)	George D. Neal (D)	Robert V. Davidson (D)	J. W. Stephen (D)	John W. Robbins (D)	John J. Terrell (D)	no such office	31D	130D, 1R, 1Pop, 1IR	3D	Charles A. Culberson (D)	Joseph W. Bailey (D)	16D	Parker/ Davis ✗
1905	S. W. T. Lanham (D)	George D. Neal (D)	Robert V. Davidson (D)	J. W. Stephen (D)	John W. Robbins (D)	John J. Terrell (D)	no such office	31D	131D, 2R	3D	Charles A. Culberson (D)	Joseph W. Bailey (D)	16D	Parker/ Davis ✗
1906	S. W. T. Lanham (D)	George D. Neal (D)	Robert V. Davidson (D)	J. W. Stephen (D)	John W. Robbins (D)	John J. Terrell (D)	no such office	31D	131D, 2R	3D	Charles A. Culberson (D)	Joseph W. Bailey (D)	16D	Parker/ Davis ✗
1907	Thomas Mitchell Campbell (D)	Asbury Bascom Davidson (D)	Robert V. Davidson (D)	J. W. Stephen (D)	Sam Sparks (D)	John J. Terrell (D)	Robert Teague Milner (D) (Note: Governor appointed first incumbent when office was created by the Legislature.)	31D	132D, 1R	3D	Charles A. Culberson (D)	Joseph W. Bailey (D)	16D	Parker/ Davis ✗
1908	Thomas Mitchell Campbell (D)	Asbury Bascom Davidson (D)	Robert V. Davidson (D)	J. W. Stephen (D)	Sam Sparks (D)	John J. Terrell (D)	Edward R. Kone (D)	31D	132D, 1R	3D	Charles A. Culberson (D)	Joseph W. Bailey (D)	16D	Bryan/ Kern (D) ✗
1909	Thomas Mitchell Campbell (D)	Asbury Bascom Davidson (D)	Robert V. Davidson (D)	J. W. Stephen (D)	Sam Sparks (D)	James T. Robison (D)	Edward R. Kone (D)	30D, 1R	131D, 2R	3D	Charles A. Culberson (D)	Joseph W. Bailey (D)	16D	Bryan/ Kern (D) ✗
1910	Thomas Mitchell Campbell (D)	Asbury Bascom Davidson (D)	Jewel P. Lightfoot (D)	J. W. Stephen (D)	Sam Sparks (D)	James T. Robison (D)	Edward R. Kone (D)	30D, 1R	131D, 2R	3D	Charles A. Culberson (D)	Joseph W. Bailey (D)	16D	Bryan/ Kern (D) ✗
1911	Oscar Branch Colquitt (D)	Asbury Bascom Davidson (D)	Jewel P. Lightfoot (D)	W. P. Lane (D)	Sam Sparks (D)	James T. Robison (D)	Edward R. Kone (D)	30D, 1R	131D, 1R	3D	Charles A. Culberson (D)	Joseph W. Bailey (D)	16D	Bryan/ Kern (D) ✗
1912	Oscar Branch Colquitt (D)	Asbury Bascom Davidson (D)	Jewel P. Lightfoot (D)	W. P. Lane (D)	J. M. Edwards (D)	James T. Robison (D)	Edward R. Kone (D)	30D, 1R	131D, 1R	3D	Charles A. Culberson (D)	Joseph W. Bailey (D)	16D	Wilson/ Marshall (D) ✓
1912	Oscar Branch Colquitt (D)	Asbury Bascom Davidson (D)	James D. Walthall (D)	W. P. Lane (D)	J. M. Edwards (D)	James T. Robison (D)	Edward R. Kone (D)	30D, 1R	131D, 1R	3D	Charles A. Culberson (D)	Joseph W. Bailey (D)	16D	Wilson/ Marshall (D) ✓
1913	Oscar Branch Colquitt (D)	William Harding Mayes (D)	B. F. Looney (D)	W. P. Lane (D)	J. M. Edwards (D)	James T. Robison (D)	Edward R. Kone (D)	30D, 1R	141D, 1R	3D	Charles A. Culberson (D)	Rienzi M. Johnston (D)	18D	Wilson/ Marshall (D) ✓
1913	Oscar Branch Colquitt (D)	William Harding Mayes (D)	B. F. Looney (D)	W. P. Lane (D)	J. M. Edwards (D)	James T. Robison (D)	Edward R. Kone (D)	30D, 1R	141D, 1R	3D	Charles A. Culberson (D)	Morris Sheppard (D)	18D	Wilson/ Marshall (D) ✓
1914	Oscar Branch Colquitt (D)	William Harding Mayes (D)	B. F. Looney (D)	W. P. Lane (D)	J. M. Edwards (D)	James T. Robison (D)	Edward R. Kone (D)	30D, 1R	141D, 1R	3D	Charles A. Culberson (D)	Morris Sheppard (D)	18D	Wilson/ Marshall (D) ✓
1915	James E. Ferguson (D) (Note: Resigned due to the legislature's bringing impeachment proceedings against him.)	William P. Hobby (D)	B. F. Looney (D)	Henry B. Terrell (D)	J. M. Edwards (D)	James T. Robison (D)	Fred Davis (D)	31D	140D, 1R, 1I	3D	Charles A. Culberson (D)	Morris Sheppard (D)	18D	Wilson/ Marshall (D) ✓
1916	James E. Ferguson (D)	William P. Hobby (D)	B. F. Looney (D)	Henry B. Terrell (D)	J. M. Edwards (D)	James T. Robison (D)	Fred Davis (D)	31D	140D, 1R, 1I	3D	Charles A. Culberson (D)	Morris Sheppard (D)	18D	Wilson/ Marshall (D) ✓
1917	William P. Hobby (D) (Note: As lieutenant governor, filled unexpired term, and was subsequently in his own right.)	vacant	B. F. Looney (D)	Henry B. Terrell (D)	J. M. Edwards (D)	James T. Robison (D)	Fred Davis (D)	31D	142D	3D	Charles A. Culberson (D)	Morris Sheppard (D)	18D	Wilson/ Marshall (D) ✓
1918	William P. Hobby (D)	vacant	B. F. Looney (D)	Henry B. Terrell (D)	J. M. Edwards (D)	James T. Robison (D)	Fred Davis (D)	31D	142D	3D	Charles A. Culberson (D)	Morris Sheppard (D)	18D	Wilson/ Marshall (D) ✓
1919	William P. Hobby (D)	W. A. Johnson (D)	Calvin Maples Cureton (D)	Henry B. Terrell (D)	John W. Baker (D)	James T. Robison (D)	Fred Davis (D)	31D	141D, 1R	3D	Charles A. Culberson (D)	Morris Sheppard (D)	18D	Wilson/ Marshall (D) ✓
1920	William P. Hobby (D)	W. A. Johnson (D)	Calvin Maples Cureton (D)	M. L. Wiginton (D)	John W. Baker (D)	James T. Robison (D)	George B. Terrell (D)	31D	141D, 1R	3D	Charles A. Culberson (D)	Morris Sheppard (D)	18D	Cox/ Roosevelt (D) ✗
1921	Pat Morris Neff (D)	Lynch Davidson (D)	Calvin Maples Cureton (D)	Lon A. Smith (D)	Charles Vernon Terrell (D)	James T. Robison (D)	George B. Terrell (D)	30D, 1R	137D, 4A, 1R	3D	Charles A. Culberson (D)	Morris Sheppard (D)	17D, 1R	Cox/ Roosevelt (D) ✗
1922	Pat Morris Neff (D)	Lynch Davidson (D)	Walter Angus Keeling (D)	Lon A. Smith (D)	Charles Vernon Terrell (D)	James T. Robison (D)	George B. Terrell (D)	30D, 1R	137D, 4A, 1R	3D	Charles A. Culberson (D)	Morris Sheppard (D)	17D, 1R	Cox/ Roosevelt (D) ✗
1923	Pat Morris Neff (D)	Thomas W. Davidson (D)	Walter Angus Keeling (D)	Lon A. Smith (D)	Charles Vernon Terrell (D)	James T. Robison (D)	George B. Terrell (D)	30D, 1R	149D, 1R	3D	Earle B. Mayfield (D)	Morris Sheppard (D)	17D, 1R	Cox/ Roosevelt (D) ✗
1924	Pat Morris Neff (D)	Thomas W. Davidson (D)	Walter Angus Keeling (D)	Lon A. Smith (D)	Sidney Lee Staples (D)	James T. Robison (D)	George B. Terrell (D)	30D, 1R	149D, 1R	3D	Earle B. Mayfield (D)	Morris Sheppard (D)	17D, 1R	Davis/ Bryan (D) ✗
1925	Miriam A. Ferguson (D)	Barry Miller (D)	Dan Moody (D)	Sam Houston Terrell (D)	W. Gregory Hatcher (D)	James T. Robison (D)	George B. Terrell (D)	30D, 1R	149D, 1R	3D	Earle B. Mayfield (D)	Morris Sheppard (D)	17D, 1R	Davis/ Bryan (D) ✗
1926	Miriam A. Ferguson (D)	Barry Miller (D)	Dan Moody (D)	Sam Houston Terrell (D)	W. Gregory Hatcher (D)	James T. Robison (D)	George B. Terrell (D)	30D, 1R	149D, 1R	3D	Earle B. Mayfield (D)	Morris Sheppard (D)	17D, 1R	Davis/ Bryan (D) ✗
1927	Dan Moody (D)	Barry Miller (D)	Claude Pollard (D)	Sam Houston Terrell (D)	W. Gregory Hatcher (D)	James T. Robison (D)	George B. Terrell (D)	30D, 1R	149D, 1R	3D	Earle B. Mayfield (D)	Morris Sheppard (D)	17D, 1R	Davis/ Bryan (D) ✗
1928	Dan Moody (D)	Barry Miller (D)	Claude Pollard (D)	Sam Houston Terrell (D)	W. Gregory Hatcher (D)	James T. Robison (D)	George B. Terrell (D)	30D, 1R	149D, 1R	3D	Earle B. Mayfield (D)	Morris Sheppard (D)	17D, 1R	Hoover/ Curtis (R) ✓
1929	Dan Moody (D)	Barry Miller (D)	Claude Pollard (D)	Sam Houston Terrell (D)	W. Gregory Hatcher (D)	James T. Robison (D)	George B. Terrell (D)	31D	149D, 1R	3D	Tom Connally (D)	Morris Sheppard (D)	18D	Hoover/ Curtis (R) ✓
1929	Dan Moody (D)	Barry Miller (D)	Robert L. Bobbitt (D)	Sam Houston Terrell (D)	W. Gregory Hatcher (D)	J. H. Walker (D)	George B. Terrell (D)	31D	149D, 1R	3D	Tom Connally (D)	Morris Sheppard (D)	18D	Hoover/ Curtis (R) ✓
1930	Dan Moody (D)	Barry Miller (D)	Robert L. Bobbitt (D)	Sam Houston Terrell (D)	W. Gregory Hatcher (D)	J. H. Walker (D)	George B. Terrell (D)	31D	149D, 1R	3D	Tom Connally (D)	Morris Sheppard (D)	17D, 1R (Note: Republican Harry M. Wurzbach successfully contested the election of Democrat Augustus McCloskey.)	Hoover/ Curtis (R) ✓
1931	Ross S. Sterling (D)	Edgar E. Witt (D)	James Allred (D)	George H. Sheppard (D) (Note: Died in office.)	Charley Lockhart (D)	J. H. Walker (D)	James E. McDonald (D)	31D	150D (Note: Rep. Homer Leonard was elected as a write-in candidate as the candidate for the Good Government League. He officially served as a Democrat during his first term but as an independent during the following three.)	3D	Tom Connally (D)	Morris Sheppard (D)	17D, 1R	Hoover/ Curtis (R) ✓
1932	Ross S. Sterling (D)	Edgar E. Witt (D)	James Allred (D)	George H. Sheppard (D)	Charley Lockhart (D)	J. H. Walker (D)	James E. McDonald (D)	31D	150D	3D	Tom Connally (D)	Morris Sheppard (D)	18D (Note: Democrat Richard M. Kleberg won a special election to fill the seat of Republican Harry M. Wurzbach, who died.)	Roosevelt/ Garner (D) ✓
1933	Miriam A. Ferguson (D)	Edgar E. Witt (D)	James Allred (D)	George H. Sheppard (D)	Charley Lockhart (D)	J. H. Walker (D)	James E. McDonald (D)	31D	148D, 2I	3D	Tom Connally (D)	Morris Sheppard (D)	21D	Roosevelt/ Garner (D) ✓
1934	Miriam A. Ferguson (D)	Edgar E. Witt (D)	James Allred (D)	George H. Sheppard (D)	Charley Lockhart (D)	J. H. Walker (D)	James E. McDonald (D)	31D	148D, 2I	3D	Tom Connally (D)	Morris Sheppard (D)	21D	Roosevelt/ Garner (D) ✓
1935	James Allred (D)	Walter Frank Woodul (D)	William McCraw (D)	George H. Sheppard (D)	Charley Lockhart (D)	J. H. Walker (D)	James E. McDonald (D)	31D	149D, 1I	3D	Tom Connally (D)	Morris Sheppard (D)	21D	Roosevelt/ Garner (D) ✓
1936	James Allred (D)	Walter Frank Woodul (D)	William McCraw (D)	George H. Sheppard (D)	Charley Lockhart (D)	J. H. Walker (D)	James E. McDonald (D)	31D	149D, 1I	3D	Tom Connally (D)	Morris Sheppard (D)	21D	Roosevelt/ Garner (D) ✓
1937	James Allred (D)	Walter Frank Woodul (D)	William McCraw (D)	George H. Sheppard (D)	Charley Lockhart (D)	William H. McDonald (D)	James E. McDonald (D)	31D	149D, 1I	3D	Tom Connally (D)	Morris Sheppard (D)	21D	Roosevelt/ Garner (D) ✓
1938	James Allred (D)	Walter Frank Woodul (D)	William McCraw (D)	George H. Sheppard (D)	Charley Lockhart (D)	William H. McDonald (D)	James E. McDonald (D)	31D	149D, 1I	3D	Tom Connally (D)	Morris Sheppard (D)	21D	Roosevelt/ Garner (D) ✓
1939	W. Lee O'Daniel (D) (Note: Resigned after winning the Democratic primary for a United States Senate seat; he won the election.)	Coke R. Stevenson (D)	Gerald Mann (D)	George H. Sheppard (D)	Charley Lockhart (D)	Bascom Giles (D)	James E. McDonald (D)	31D	150D	3D	Tom Connally (D)	Morris Sheppard (D)	21D	Roosevelt/ Garner (D) ✓
1940	W. Lee O'Daniel (D)	Coke R. Stevenson (D)	Gerald Mann (D)	George H. Sheppard (D)	Charley Lockhart (D)	Bascom Giles (D)	James E. McDonald (D)	31D	150D	3D	Tom Connally (D)	Morris Sheppard (D)	21D	Roosevelt/ Wallace (D) ✓
1941	W. Lee O'Daniel (D)	Coke R. Stevenson (D)	Gerald Mann (D)	George H. Sheppard (D)	Charley Lockhart (D)	Bascom Giles (D)	James E. McDonald (D)	31D	150D	3D	Tom Connally (D)	Morris Sheppard (D)	21D	Roosevelt/ Wallace (D) ✓
1941	W. Lee O'Daniel (D)	Coke R. Stevenson (D)	Gerald Mann (D)	George H. Sheppard (D)	Jesse James (D)	Bascom Giles (D)	James E. McDonald (D)	31D	150D	3D	Tom Connally (D)	A. J. Houston (D)	21D	Roosevelt/ Wallace (D) ✓
1941	Coke R. Stevenson (D)	vacant	Gerald Mann (D)	George H. Sheppard (D)	Jesse James (D)	Bascom Giles (D)	James E. McDonald (D)	31D	150D	3D	Tom Connally (D)	W. Lee O'Daniel (D)	21D	Roosevelt/ Wallace (D) ✓
1942	Coke R. Stevenson (D)	vacant	Gerald Mann (D)	George H. Sheppard (D)	Jesse James (D)	Bascom Giles (D)	James E. McDonald (D)	31D	150D	3D	Tom Connally (D)	W. Lee O'Daniel (D)	21D	Roosevelt/ Wallace (D) ✓
1943	Coke R. Stevenson (D)	John Lee Smith (D)	Gerald Mann (D)	George H. Sheppard (D)	Jesse James (D)	Bascom Giles (D)	James E. McDonald (D)	31D	150D	3D	Tom Connally (D)	W. Lee O'Daniel (D)	21D	Roosevelt/ Wallace (D) ✓
1944	Coke R. Stevenson (D)	John Lee Smith (D)	Grover Sellers (D)	George H. Sheppard (D)	Jesse James (D)	Bascom Giles (D)	James E. McDonald (D)	31D	150D	3D	Tom Connally (D)	W. Lee O'Daniel (D)	21D	Roosevelt/ Truman (D) ✓
1945	Coke R. Stevenson (D)	John Lee Smith (D)	Grover Sellers (D)	George H. Sheppard (D)	Jesse James (D)	Bascom Giles (D)	James E. McDonald (D)	31D	150D	3D	Tom Connally (D)	W. Lee O'Daniel (D)	21D	Roosevelt/ Truman (D) ✓
1946	Coke R. Stevenson (D)	John Lee Smith (D)	Grover Sellers (D)	George H. Sheppard (D)	Jesse James (D)	Bascom Giles (D)	James E. McDonald (D)	31D	150D	3D	Tom Connally (D)	W. Lee O'Daniel (D)	21D	Roosevelt/ Truman (D) ✓
1947	Beauford H. Jester (D)	Allan Shivers (D)	Price Daniel (D)	George H. Sheppard (D)	Jesse James (D)	Bascom Giles (D)	James E. McDonald (D)	31D	150D	3D	Tom Connally (D)	W. Lee O'Daniel (D)	21D	Roosevelt/ Truman (D) ✓
1948	Beauford H. Jester (D)	Allan Shivers (D)	Price Daniel (D)	George H. Sheppard (D)	Jesse James (D)	Bascom Giles (D)	James E. McDonald (D)	31D	150D	3D	Tom Connally (D)	W. Lee O'Daniel (D)	21D	Truman/ Barkley (D) ✓
1949	Allan Shivers (D)	vacant	Price Daniel (D)	Robert S. Calvert (D)	Jesse James (D)	Bascom Giles (D)	James E. McDonald (D)	31D	150D	3D	Tom Connally (D)	Lyndon B. Johnson (D)	21D	Truman/ Barkley (D) ✓
1950	Allan Shivers (D)	vacant	Price Daniel (D)	Robert S. Calvert (D)	Jesse James (D)	Bascom Giles (D)	James E. McDonald (D)	31D	150D	3D	Tom Connally (D)	Lyndon B. Johnson (D)	20D, 1R (Note: Republican Ben H. Guill won a special election to succeed Democrat Eugene Worley, who resigned, flipping a seat.)	Truman/ Barkley (D) ✓
1951	Allan Shivers (D)	Ben Ramsey (D)	Price Daniel (D)	Robert S. Calvert (D)	Jesse James (D)	Bascom Giles (D)	John Coyle White (D)	31D	149D, 1R (Note: Edward T. Dicker was the sole Republican in the legislature.)	3D	Tom Connally (D)	Lyndon B. Johnson (D)	21D	Truman/ Barkley (D) ✓
1952	Allan Shivers (D)	Ben Ramsey (D)	Price Daniel (D)	Robert S. Calvert (D)	Jesse James (D)	Bascom Giles (D)	John Coyle White (D)	31D	149D, 1R	3D	Tom Connally (D)	Lyndon B. Johnson (D)	21D	Eisenhower/ Nixon (R) ✓
1953	Allan Shivers (D)	Ben Ramsey (D)	John Ben Shepperd (D)	Robert S. Calvert (D)	Jesse James (D)	Bascom Giles (D)	John Coyle White (D)	31D	150D	3D	Price Daniel (D)	Lyndon B. Johnson (D)	22D	Eisenhower/ Nixon (R) ✓
1954	Allan Shivers (D)	Ben Ramsey (D)	John Ben Shepperd (D)	Robert S. Calvert (D)	Jesse James (D)	Bascom Giles (D)	John Coyle White (D)	31D	150D	3D	Price Daniel (D)	Lyndon B. Johnson (D)	22D	Eisenhower/ Nixon (R) ✓
1955	Allan Shivers (D)	Ben Ramsey (D)	John Ben Shepperd (D)	Robert S. Calvert (D)	Jesse James (D)	James Earl Rudder (D)	John Coyle White (D)	31D	150D	3D	Price Daniel (D)	Lyndon B. Johnson (D)	21D, 1R	Eisenhower/ Nixon (R) ✓
1956	Allan Shivers (D)	Ben Ramsey (D)	John Ben Shepperd (D)	Robert S. Calvert (D)	Jesse James (D)	James Earl Rudder (D)	John Coyle White (D)	31D	150D	3D	Price Daniel (D)	Lyndon B. Johnson (D)	21D, 1R	Eisenhower/ Nixon (R) ✓
1957	Price Daniel (D)	Ben Ramsey (D)	Will Wilson (D)	Robert S. Calvert (D)	Jesse James (D)	James Earl Rudder (D)	John Coyle White (D)	31D	150D	3D	William A. Blakley (D)	Lyndon B. Johnson (D)	21D, 1R	Eisenhower/ Nixon (R) ✓
1957	Price Daniel (D)	Ben Ramsey (D)	Will Wilson (D)	Robert S. Calvert (D)	Jesse James (D)	James Earl Rudder (D)	John Coyle White (D)	31D	150D	3D	Ralph Yarborough (D)	Lyndon B. Johnson (D)	21D, 1R	Eisenhower/ Nixon (R) ✓
1958	Price Daniel (D)	Ben Ramsey (D)	Will Wilson (D)	Robert S. Calvert (D)	Jesse James (D)	Bill Allcorn (D)	John Coyle White (D)	31D	150D	3D	Ralph Yarborough (D)	Lyndon B. Johnson (D)	21D, 1R	Eisenhower/ Nixon (R) ✓
1959	Price Daniel (D)	Ben Ramsey (D)	Will Wilson (D)	Robert S. Calvert (D)	Jesse James (D)	Bill Allcorn (D)	John Coyle White (D)	31D	149D, 1I (Note: Democrat Howard Green served as an independent during the 56th legislature)	3D	Ralph Yarborough (D)	Lyndon B. Johnson (D)	21D, 1R	Eisenhower/ Nixon (R) ✓
1960	Price Daniel (D)	Ben Ramsey (D)	Will Wilson (D)	Robert S. Calvert (D)	Jesse James (D)	Bill Allcorn (D)	John Coyle White (D)	31D	149D, 1I	3D	Ralph Yarborough (D)	Lyndon B. Johnson (D)	21D, 1R	Kennedy/ Johnson (D) ✓
1961	Price Daniel (D)	Ben Ramsey (D)	Will Wilson (D)	Robert S. Calvert (D)	Jesse James (D)	Jerry Sadler (D)	John Coyle White (D)	31D	150D	3D	Ralph Yarborough (D)	William A. Blakley (D)	21D, 1R	Kennedy/ Johnson (D) ✓
1961	Price Daniel (D)	Ben Ramsey (D)	Will Wilson (D)	Robert S. Calvert (D)	Jesse James (D)	Jerry Sadler (D)	John Coyle White (D)	31D	150D	3D	Ralph Yarborough (D)	John Tower (R)	21D, 1R	Kennedy/ Johnson (D) ✓
1962	Price Daniel (D)	Ben Ramsey (D)	Will Wilson (D)	Robert S. Calvert (D)	Jesse James (D)	Jerry Sadler (D)	John Coyle White (D)	31D	148D, 2R (Note: Kenneth Williams Kohler and George F. Korkmas were the two Republicans elected in a special election.)	3D	Ralph Yarborough (D)	John Tower (R)	21D, 1R	Kennedy/ Johnson (D) ✓
1963	John Connally (D)	Preston Smith (D)	Waggoner Carr (D)	Robert S. Calvert (D)	Jesse James (D)	Jerry Sadler (D)	John Coyle White (D)	31D	140D, 10R	3D	Ralph Yarborough (D)	John Tower (R)	21D, 2R	Kennedy/ Johnson (D) ✓
1964	John Connally (D)	Preston Smith (D)	Waggoner Carr (D)	Robert S. Calvert (D)	Jesse James (D)	Jerry Sadler (D)	John Coyle White (D)	31D	140D, 10R	3D	Ralph Yarborough (D)	John Tower (R)	21D, 2R	Johnson/ Humphrey (D) ✓
1965	John Connally (D)	Preston Smith (D)	Waggoner Carr (D)	Robert S. Calvert (D)	Jesse James (D)	Jerry Sadler (D)	John Coyle White (D)	31D	149D, 1R (Note: Frank Kell Cahoon was the sole Republican legislator.)	3D	Ralph Yarborough (D)	John Tower (R)	23D	Johnson/ Humphrey (D) ✓
1966	John Connally (D)	Preston Smith (D)	Waggoner Carr (D)	Robert S. Calvert (D)	Jesse James (D)	Jerry Sadler (D)	John Coyle White (D)	31D	149D, 1R	3D	Ralph Yarborough (D)	John Tower (R)	23D	Johnson/ Humphrey (D) ✓
1967	John Connally (D)	Preston Smith (D)	Crawford Martin (D)	Robert S. Calvert (D)	Jesse James (D)	Jerry Sadler (D)	John Coyle White (D)	30D, 1R	143D, 7R	3D	Ralph Yarborough (D)	John Tower (R)	21D, 2R	Johnson/ Humphrey (D) ✓
1968	John Connally (D)	Preston Smith (D)	Crawford Martin (D)	Robert S. Calvert (D)	Jesse James (D)	Jerry Sadler (D)	John Coyle White (D)	29D, 2R (Note: Republican Ike Harris won a 1967 special election to fill the seat of Democrat George Parkhouse, who died.)	143D, 7R	3D	Ralph Yarborough (D)	John Tower (R)	20D, 3R (Note: Republican James M. Collins won a special election to fill the seat of Democrat Joe R. Pool, who died.)	Humphrey/ Muskie (D) ✗
1969	Preston Smith (D)	Ben Barnes (D)	Crawford Martin (D)	Robert S. Calvert (D)	Jesse James (D)	Jerry Sadler (D)	John Coyle White (D)	29D, 2R	141D, 8R, 1I (Note: John Poerner won his seat as a Republican in a special election March, but changed to Independent once sworn into the House.)	3D	Ralph Yarborough (D)	John Tower (R)	20D, 3R	Humphrey/ Muskie (D) ✗
1970	Preston Smith (D)	Ben Barnes (D)	Crawford Martin (D)	Robert S. Calvert (D)	Jesse James (D)	Jerry Sadler (D)	John Coyle White (D)	29D, 2R	141D, 8R, 1I	3D	Ralph Yarborough (D)	John Tower (R)	20D, 3R	Humphrey/ Muskie (D) ✗
1971	Preston Smith (D)	Ben Barnes (D)	Crawford Martin (D)	Robert S. Calvert (D)	Jesse James (D)	Bob Armstrong (D)	John Coyle White (D)	29D, 2R	140D, 10R	3D	Lloyd Bentsen (D)	John Tower (R)	20D, 3R	Humphrey/ Muskie (D) ✗
1972	Preston Smith (D)	Ben Barnes (D)	Crawford Martin (D)	Robert S. Calvert (D)	Jesse James (D)	Bob Armstrong (D)	John Coyle White (D)	29D, 2R	140D, 10R	3D	Lloyd Bentsen (D)	John Tower (R)	20D, 3R	Nixon/ Agnew (R) ✓
1973	Dolph Briscoe (D)	William P. Hobby Jr. (D)	John Hill (D)	Robert S. Calvert (D)	Jesse James (D)	Bob Armstrong (D)	John Coyle White (D)	28D, 3R	133D, 17R	3D	Lloyd Bentsen (D)	John Tower (R)	20D, 4R	Nixon/ Agnew (R) ✓
1974	Dolph Briscoe (D)	William P. Hobby Jr. (D)	John Hill (D)	Robert S. Calvert (D)	Jesse James (D)	Bob Armstrong (D)	John Coyle White (D)	28D, 3R	133D, 17R	3D	Lloyd Bentsen (D)	John Tower (R)	20D, 4R	Nixon/ Agnew (R) ✓
1975	Dolph Briscoe (D)	William P. Hobby Jr. (D)	John Hill (D)	Bob Bullock (D)	Jesse James (D)	Bob Armstrong (D)	John Coyle White (D)	28D, 3R	134D, 16R	3D	Lloyd Bentsen (D)	John Tower (R)	21D, 3R	Nixon/ Agnew (R) ✓
1976	Dolph Briscoe (D)	William P. Hobby Jr. (D)	John Hill (D)	Bob Bullock (D)	Jesse James (D)	Bob Armstrong (D)	John Coyle White (D)	28D, 3R	133D, 17R	3D	Lloyd Bentsen (D)	John Tower (R)	20D, 4R (Note: Republican Ron Paul won a special election to succeed Democrat Robert R. Casey, who resigned, flipping a seat.)	Carter/ Mondale (D) ✓
1977	Dolph Briscoe (D)	William P. Hobby Jr. (D)	John Hill (D)	Bob Bullock (D)	Warren G. Harding (D)	Bob Armstrong (D)	Reagan V. Brown (D)	28D, 3R	132D, 18R	3D	Lloyd Bentsen (D)	John Tower (R)	22D, 2R	Carter/ Mondale (D) ✓
1978	Dolph Briscoe (D)	William P. Hobby Jr. (D)	John Hill (D)	Bob Bullock (D)	Warren G. Harding (D)	Bob Armstrong (D)	Reagan V. Brown (D)	27D, 4R (Note: Republican Bob Price won a 1977 special election to fill the seat of Democrat Max Sherman, who resigned.)	131D, 19R	3D	Lloyd Bentsen (D)	John Tower (R)	22D, 2R	Carter/ Mondale (D) ✓
1979	Bill Clements (R)	William P. Hobby Jr. (D)	Mark White (D)	Bob Bullock (D)	Warren G. Harding (D)	Bob Armstrong (D)	Reagan V. Brown (D)	27D, 4R	127D, 23R	3D	Lloyd Bentsen (D)	John Tower (R)	20D, 4R	Carter/ Mondale (D) ✓
1980	Bill Clements (R)	William P. Hobby Jr. (D)	Mark White (D)	Bob Bullock (D)	Warren G. Harding (D)	Bob Armstrong (D)	Reagan V. Brown (D)	27D, 4R	127D, 23R	3D	Lloyd Bentsen (D)	John Tower (R)	20D, 4R	Reagan/ Bush (R) ✓
1981	Bill Clements (R)	William P. Hobby Jr. (D)	Mark White (D)	Bob Bullock (D)	Warren G. Harding (D)	Bob Armstrong (D)	Reagan V. Brown (D)	24D, 7R	113D, 37R	3D	Lloyd Bentsen (D)	John Tower (R)	19D, 5R	Reagan/ Bush (R) ✓
1982	Bill Clements (R)	William P. Hobby Jr. (D)	Mark White (D)	Bob Bullock (D)	Warren G. Harding (D)	Bob Armstrong (D)	Reagan V. Brown (D)	24D, 7R	113D, 37R	3D	Lloyd Bentsen (D)	John Tower (R)	19D, 5R	Reagan/ Bush (R) ✓
1983	Mark White (D)	William P. Hobby Jr. (D)	Jim Mattox (D)	Bob Bullock (D)	Ann Richards (D)	Garry Mauro (D)	Jim Hightower (D)	26D, 5R	113D, 37R	3D	Lloyd Bentsen (D)	John Tower (R)	21D, 6R (Note: Representative Phil Gramm resigned and switched parties from Democratic to Republican. He then won the ensuing special election to succeed himself.)	Reagan/ Bush (R) ✓
1984	Mark White (D)	William P. Hobby Jr. (D)	Jim Mattox (D)	Bob Bullock (D)	Ann Richards (D)	Garry Mauro (D)	Jim Hightower (D)	26D, 5R	113D, 37R	3D	Lloyd Bentsen (D)	John Tower (R)	21D, 6R	Reagan/ Bush (R) ✓
1985	Mark White (D)	William P. Hobby Jr. (D)	Jim Mattox (D)	Bob Bullock (D)	Ann Richards (D)	Garry Mauro (D)	Jim Hightower (D)	25D, 6R	95D, 55R	3D	Lloyd Bentsen (D)	Phil Gramm (R)	17D, 10R	Reagan/ Bush (R) ✓
1986	Mark White (D)	William P. Hobby Jr. (D)	Jim Mattox (D)	Bob Bullock (D)	Ann Richards (D)	Garry Mauro (D)	Jim Hightower (D)	25D, 6R	95D, 55R	3D	Lloyd Bentsen (D)	Phil Gramm (R)	17D, 10R	Reagan/ Bush (R) ✓
1987	Bill Clements (R)	William P. Hobby Jr. (D)	Jim Mattox (D)	Bob Bullock (D)	Ann Richards (D)	Garry Mauro (D)	Jim Hightower (D)	25D, 6R	94D, 56R	3D	Lloyd Bentsen (D)	Phil Gramm (R)	17D, 10R	Reagan/ Bush (R) ✓
1988	Bill Clements (R)	William P. Hobby Jr. (D)	Jim Mattox (D)	Bob Bullock (D)	Ann Richards (D)	Garry Mauro (D)	Jim Hightower (D)	25D, 6R	94D, 56R	3D	Lloyd Bentsen (D)	Phil Gramm (R)	17D, 10R	Bush/ Quayle (R) ✓
1989	Bill Clements (R)	William P. Hobby Jr. (D)	Jim Mattox (D)	Bob Bullock (D)	Ann Richards (D)	Garry Mauro (D)	Jim Hightower (D)	23D, 8R	91D, 59R (Note: Republicans gained two seats in special elections in early 1989)	3D	Lloyd Bentsen (D)	Phil Gramm (R)	19D, 8R	Bush/ Quayle (R) ✓
1990	Bill Clements (R)	William P. Hobby Jr. (D)	Jim Mattox (D)	Bob Bullock (D)	Ann Richards (D)	Garry Mauro (D)	Jim Hightower (D)	23D, 8R	91D, 59R	3D	Lloyd Bentsen (D)	Phil Gramm (R)	19D, 8R	Bush/ Quayle (R) ✓
1991	Ann Richards (D)	Bob Bullock (D)	Dan Morales (D)	John Sharp (D)	Kay Bailey Hutchison (R)	Garry Mauro (D)	Rick Perry (R)	22D, 9R (Note: Republican David Sibley won a February special election to fill the seat of Democrat Chet Edwards, who resigned to become a U.S. Representative.)	93D, 57R	3D	Lloyd Bentsen (D)	Phil Gramm (R)	19D, 8R	Bush/ Quayle (R) ✓
1992	Ann Richards (D)	Bob Bullock (D)	Dan Morales (D)	John Sharp (D)	Kay Bailey Hutchison (R)	Garry Mauro (D)	Rick Perry (R)	22D, 9R	92D, 58R (Note: Republicans gained one seat in a special election)	3D	Lloyd Bentsen (D)	Phil Gramm (R)	19D, 8R	Bush/ Quayle (R) ✗
1993	Ann Richards (D)	Bob Bullock (D)	Dan Morales (D)	John Sharp (D)	Kay Bailey Hutchison (R)	Garry Mauro (D)	Rick Perry (R)	18D, 13R	92D, 58R	2D, 1R	Bob Krueger (D)	Phil Gramm (R)	21D, 9R	Bush/ Quayle (R) ✗
1993	Ann Richards (D)	Bob Bullock (D)	Dan Morales (D)	John Sharp (D)	Martha Whitehead (D) (Note: Initially appointed to fill vacancy; later elected in his or her own right.)	Garry Mauro (D)	Rick Perry (R)	18D, 13R	92D, 58R	2D, 1R	Kay Bailey Hutchison (R)	Phil Gramm (R)	21D, 9R	Bush/ Quayle (R) ✗
1994	Ann Richards (D)	Bob Bullock (D)	Dan Morales (D)	John Sharp (D)	Martha Whitehead (D)	Garry Mauro (D)	Rick Perry (R)	18D, 13R	91D, 59R (Note: Representative Ric Williams switched parties.)	2D, 1R	Kay Bailey Hutchison (R)	Phil Gramm (R)	21D, 9R	Bush/ Quayle (R) ✗
1995	George W. Bush (R)	Bob Bullock (D)	Dan Morales (D)	John Sharp (D)	Martha Whitehead (D)	Garry Mauro (D)	Rick Perry (R)	17D, 14R	89D, 61R	3R	Kay Bailey Hutchison (R)	Phil Gramm (R)	19D, 11R	Bush/ Quayle (R) ✗
1996	George W. Bush (R)	Bob Bullock (D)	Dan Morales (D)	John Sharp (D)	Martha Whitehead (D)	Garry Mauro (D)	Rick Perry (R)	17D, 14R	87D, 63R (Note: In February 1995, Republican Todd Staples won a special election to flip a seat. Later in 1995, Representative Warren Chisum switched parties.)	3R	Kay Bailey Hutchison (R)	Phil Gramm (R)	18D, 12R (Note: Representative Greg Laughlin switched parties from Democratic to Republican.)	Dole/ Kemp (R) ✗
1997	George W. Bush (R)	Bob Bullock (D)	Dan Morales (D)	John Sharp (D)	office abolished (Note: In 1996, voters approved a constitutional amendment abolishing the Office of State Treasurer and transferring its functions to the Office of Comptroller of Public Accounts.)	Garry Mauro (D)	Rick Perry (R)	17R, 14D (Note: In January 1997, Republican Steve Ogden won a special election to flip a seat.)	82D, 68R	3R	Kay Bailey Hutchison (R)	Phil Gramm (R)	17D, 13R	Dole/ Kemp (R) ✗
1998	George W. Bush (R)	Bob Bullock (D)	Dan Morales (D)	John Sharp (D)	office abolished	Garry Mauro (D)	Rick Perry (R)	17R, 14D	82D, 68R	3R	Kay Bailey Hutchison (R)	Phil Gramm (R)	17D, 13R	Dole/ Kemp (R) ✗

== 1999–present ==
Year	Executive offices						State Legislature		R. R. Comm.	United States Congress			Electoral votes
Year	Governor	Lieutenant Governor	Attorney General	Comptroller	Land Comm.	Ag. Comm.	Senate	House	R. R. Comm.	U.S. Senator (Class I)	U.S. Senator (Class II)	U.S. House	Electoral votes
1999	George W. Bush (R)	Rick Perry (R)	John Cornyn (R)	Carole Keeton; Strayhorn (R)	David Dewhurst (R)	Susan Combs (R)	16R, 15D	78D, 72R	3R	Kay Bailey; Hutchison (R)	Phil Gramm (R)	17D, 13R	
2000	George W. Bush (R)	Rick Perry (R)	John Cornyn (R)	Carole Keeton; Strayhorn (R)	David Dewhurst (R)	Susan Combs (R)	16R, 15D	78D, 72R	3R	Kay Bailey; Hutchison (R)	Phil Gramm (R)	17D, 13R	Bush/ Cheney (R) ✓
2001	Rick Perry (R)	Bill Ratliff (R)	John Cornyn (R)	Carole Keeton; Strayhorn (R)	David Dewhurst (R)	Susan Combs (R)	16R, 15D	78D, 72R	3R	Kay Bailey; Hutchison (R)	Phil Gramm (R)	17D, 13R	Bush/ Cheney (R) ✓
2002	Rick Perry (R)	Bill Ratliff (R)	John Cornyn (R)	Carole Keeton; Strayhorn (R)	David Dewhurst (R)	Susan Combs (R)	16R, 15D	78D, 72R	3R	Kay Bailey; Hutchison (R)	Phil Gramm (R)	17D, 13R	Bush/ Cheney (R) ✓
2003	Rick Perry (R)	David Dewhurst (R)	Greg Abbott (R)	Carole Keeton; Strayhorn (R)	Jerry E. Patterson (R)	Susan Combs (R)	19R, 12D	88R, 62D	3R	Kay Bailey; Hutchison (R)	John Cornyn (R)	17D, 15R	Bush/ Cheney (R) ✓
2004	Rick Perry (R)	David Dewhurst (R)	Greg Abbott (R)	Carole Keeton; Strayhorn (R)	Jerry E. Patterson (R)	Susan Combs (R)	19R, 12D	88R, 62D	3R	Kay Bailey; Hutchison (R)	John Cornyn (R)	16D, 16R (Note: Representative Ralph Hall switched parties from Democratic to Republican.)	Bush/ Cheney (R) ✓
2005	Rick Perry (R)	David Dewhurst (R)	Greg Abbott (R)	Carole Keeton; Strayhorn (R)	Jerry E. Patterson (R)	Susan Combs (R)	19R, 12D	87R, 63D	3R	Kay Bailey; Hutchison (R)	John Cornyn (R)	21R, 11D	Bush/ Cheney (R) ✓
2006	Rick Perry (R)	David Dewhurst (R)	Greg Abbott (R)	Carole Keeton; Strayhorn (R)	Jerry E. Patterson (R)	Susan Combs (R)	19R, 12D	86R, 64D (Note: Democrat Donna Howard won a special election to fill the unexpired term of Republican Todd Baxter.)	3R	Kay Bailey; Hutchison (R)	John Cornyn (R)	21R, 11D	Bush/ Cheney (R) ✓
2007	Rick Perry (R)	David Dewhurst (R)	Greg Abbott (R)	Susan Combs (R)	Jerry E. Patterson (R)	Todd Staples (R)	20R, 11D	81R, 69D	3R	Kay Bailey; Hutchison (R)	John Cornyn (R)	19R, 13D	Bush/ Cheney (R) ✓
2008	Rick Perry (R)	David Dewhurst (R)	Greg Abbott (R)	Susan Combs (R)	Jerry E. Patterson (R)	Todd Staples (R)	20R, 11D	79R, 71D (Note: Democrat Dan Barret won a special election to fill the unexpired term of Republican Anna Mowery, and Republican Kirk England switched his party affiliation from Republican to Democratic, flipping two seats.)	3R	Kay Bailey; Hutchison (R)	John Cornyn (R)	19R, 13D	McCain/ Palin (R) ✗
2009	Rick Perry (R)	David Dewhurst (R)	Greg Abbott (R)	Susan Combs (R)	Jerry E. Patterson (R)	Todd Staples (R)	19R, 12D	76R, 74D	3R	Kay Bailey; Hutchison (R)	John Cornyn (R)	20R, 12D	McCain/ Palin (R) ✗
2010	Rick Perry (R)	David Dewhurst (R)	Greg Abbott (R)	Susan Combs (R)	Jerry E. Patterson (R)	Todd Staples (R)	19R, 12D	77R, 73D (Note: Representative Chuck Hopson switched parties from Democratic to Republican in November 2009.)	3R	Kay Bailey; Hutchison (R)	John Cornyn (R)	20R, 12D	McCain/ Palin (R) ✗
2011	Rick Perry (R)	David Dewhurst (R)	Greg Abbott (R)	Susan Combs (R)	Jerry E. Patterson (R)	Todd Staples (R)	19R, 12D	101R, 49D (Note: Representatives Allan Ritter and Aaron Peña switched parties from Democratic to Republican after the election.)	3R	Kay Bailey; Hutchison (R)	John Cornyn (R)	23R, 9D	McCain/ Palin (R) ✗
2012	Rick Perry (R)	David Dewhurst (R)	Greg Abbott (R)	Susan Combs (R)	Jerry E. Patterson (R)	Todd Staples (R)	19R, 12D	102R, 48D (Note: Representative J.M. Lozano switched parties from Democratic to Republican in March.)	3R	Kay Bailey; Hutchison (R)	John Cornyn (R)	23R, 9D	Romney/ Ryan (R) ✗
2013	Rick Perry (R)	David Dewhurst (R)	Greg Abbott (R)	Susan Combs (R)	Jerry E. Patterson (R)	Todd Staples (R)	19R, 12D	95R, 55D	3R	Ted Cruz (R)	John Cornyn (R)	24R, 12D	Romney/ Ryan (R) ✗
2014	Rick Perry (R)	David Dewhurst (R)	Greg Abbott (R)	Susan Combs (R)	Jerry E. Patterson (R)	Todd Staples (R)	19R, 12D	95R, 55D	3R	Ted Cruz (R)	John Cornyn (R)	24R, 12D	Romney/ Ryan (R) ✗
2015	Greg Abbott (R)	Dan Patrick (R)	Ken Paxton (R)	Glenn Hegar (R) (Note: Resigned.)	George P. Bush (R)	Sid Miller (R)	20R, 11D	98R, 52D	3R	Ted Cruz (R)	John Cornyn (R)	25R, 11D	Romney/ Ryan (R) ✗
2016	Greg Abbott (R)	Dan Patrick (R)	Ken Paxton (R)	Glenn Hegar (R)	George P. Bush (R)	Sid Miller (R)	20R, 11D	99R, 50D, 1I (Note: Republican John Lujan won a special election to succeed Democrat Joe Farias, who resigned, flipping a seat. Additionally, Independent Laura Thompson won a special election to succeed Democrat Ruth Jones McClendon, who resigned, flipping another seat.)	3R	Ted Cruz (R)	John Cornyn (R)	25R, 11D	Trump/ Pence (R) ✓
2017	Greg Abbott (R)	Dan Patrick (R)	Ken Paxton (R)	Glenn Hegar (R)	George P. Bush (R)	Sid Miller (R)	20R, 11D	95R, 55D	3R	Ted Cruz (R)	John Cornyn (R)	25R, 11D	Trump/ Pence (R) ✓
2018	Greg Abbott (R)	Dan Patrick (R)	Ken Paxton (R)	Glenn Hegar (R)	George P. Bush (R)	Sid Miller (R)	20R, 11D	95R, 55D	3R	Ted Cruz (R)	John Cornyn (R)	25R, 11D	Trump/ Pence (R) ✓
2018	Greg Abbott (R)	Dan Patrick (R)	Ken Paxton (R)	Glenn Hegar (R)	George P. Bush (R)	Sid Miller (R)	21R, 10D (Note: Republican Pete Flores won a special election to succeed Democrat Carlos Uresti, who resigned, flipping a seat.)	95R, 55D	3R	Ted Cruz (R)	John Cornyn (R)	25R, 11D	Trump/ Pence (R) ✓
2019	Greg Abbott (R)	Dan Patrick (R)	Ken Paxton (R)	Glenn Hegar (R)	George P. Bush (R)	Sid Miller (R)	19R, 12D	83R, 67D	3R	Ted Cruz (R)	John Cornyn (R)	23R, 13D	Trump/ Pence (R) ✓
2020	Greg Abbott (R)	Dan Patrick (R)	Ken Paxton (R)	Glenn Hegar (R)	George P. Bush (R)	Sid Miller (R)	19R, 12D	83R, 67D	3R	Ted Cruz (R)	John Cornyn (R)	23R, 13D	Trump/ Pence (R) ✗
2021	Greg Abbott (R)	Dan Patrick (R)	Ken Paxton (R)	Glenn Hegar (R)	George P. Bush (R)	Sid Miller (R)	18R, 13D	83R, 67D	3R	Ted Cruz (R)	John Cornyn (R)	23R, 13D	Trump/ Pence (R) ✗
2022	Greg Abbott (R)	Dan Patrick (R)	Ken Paxton (R)	Glenn Hegar (R)	George P. Bush (R)	Sid Miller (R)	18R, 13D	85R, 65D (Note: Republican John Lujan won a special election to succeed Democrat Leo Pacheco, who resigned, flipping a seat. Additionally, Ryan Guillen switched parties from Democratic to Republican.)	3R	Ted Cruz (R)	John Cornyn (R)	24R, 12D (Note: Republican Mayra Flores won a special election to succeed Democrat Filemon Vela Jr., who resigned, flipping a seat.)	Trump/ Pence (R) ✗
2023	Greg Abbott (R)	Dan Patrick (R)	Ken Paxton (R)	Glenn Hegar (R)	Dawn Buckingham (R)	Sid Miller (R)	19R, 12D	86R, 64D	3R	Ted Cruz (R)	John Cornyn (R)	25R, 13D	Trump/ Pence (R) ✗
2024	Greg Abbott (R)	Dan Patrick (R)	Ken Paxton (R)	Glenn Hegar (R)	Dawn Buckingham (R)	Sid Miller (R)	19R, 12D	87R, 63D (Note: Shawn Thierry switched parties from Democratic to Republican in August.)	3R	Ted Cruz (R)	John Cornyn (R)	25R, 13D	Trump/ Vance (R) ✓
2025	Greg Abbott (R)	Dan Patrick (R)	Ken Paxton (R)	Kelly Hancock (R) (Note: Acting.)	Dawn Buckingham (R)	Sid Miller (R)	20R, 11D	88R, 62D	3R	Ted Cruz (R)	John Cornyn (R)	25R, 13D	Trump/ Vance (R) ✓
2026	Greg Abbott (R)	Dan Patrick (R)	Ken Paxton (R)	Kelly Hancock (R)	Dawn Buckingham (R)	Sid Miller (R)	19R, 12D (Note: Democrat Taylor Rehmet won a special election to succeed Republican Kelly Hancock, who resigned, flipping a seat.)	88R, 62D	3R	Ted Cruz (R)	John Cornyn (R)	25R, 13D	Trump/ Vance (R) ✓
2026	Greg Abbott (R)	Dan Patrick (R)	Ken Paxton (R)	Don Huffines (R)	Dawn Buckingham (R)	Sid Miller (R)	19R, 12D	88R, 62D	3R	Ted Cruz (R)	John Cornyn (R)	25R, 13D	Trump/ Vance (R) ✓
2027	Gina Hinojosa (D)	Vikki Goodwin (D)	Nathan Johnson (D)	Sarah Eckhardt (D)	Benjamin Flores (D)	Clayton Tucker (D)	19R, 12D		2R, 1D	Ted Cruz (R)	James Talarico (D)	24R, 14D	Trump/ Vance (R) ✓

Key to party colors and abbreviations for members of the U.S. Congress and other politicians or officials
Alaskan Independence (AKIP) Know Nothing (KN) American Labor (AL) Anti-Jacksonian (Anti-J); National Republican (NR) Anti-Administration (AA) Anti-Masonic (Anti-M) Conservative (Con) Covenant (Cov)	Democratic (D) Democratic–Farmer–Labor (DFL) Democratic–NPL (D-NPL) Dixiecrat (Dix), States' Rights (SR) Democratic-Republican (DR) Farmer–Labor (FL) Federalist (F); Pro-Administration (PA)	Free Soil (FS) Fusion (Fus) Greenback (GB) Independence (IPM) Jacksonian (J) Liberal (Lib) Libertarian (L) National Union (NU)	Nonpartisan League (NPL) Nullifier (N) Opposition Northern (O); Opposition Southern (O) Populist (Pop) Progressive (Prog) Prohibition (Proh) Readjuster (Rea)	Republican (R) Silver (Sv) Silver Republican (SvR) Socialist (Soc) Union (U) Unconditional Union (UU) Vermont Progressive (VP) Whig (W)	Independent (I) Nonpartisan (NP)
