= George McCormick (Texas politician) =

American lawyer and politician (1841–1905)

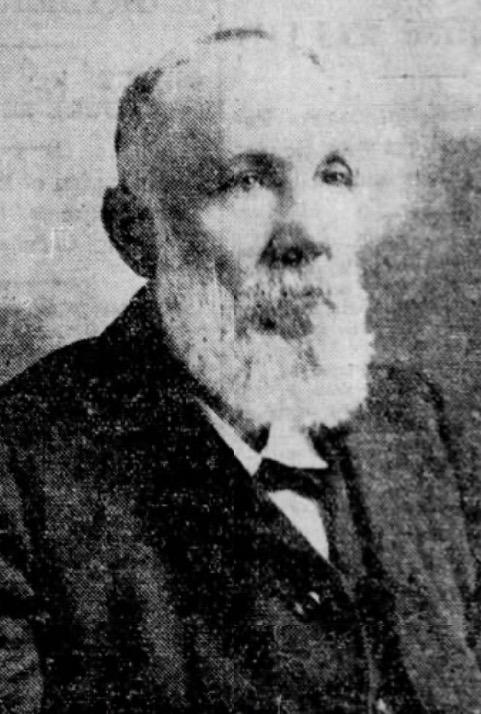

Texas Attorney General
- In office 1874–1876
- Preceded by: Hannibal Boone
- Succeeded by: James H. McLeary

Personal details
- Born: October 12, 1841 Fauquier County, Virginia, US
- Died: November 5, 1905 (aged 64) Columbus, Texas, US
- Party: Democratic
- Occupation: Lawyer, politician

Military service
- Allegiance: Confederate States of America
- Branch/service: Confederate States Army
- Years of service: 1861–1864
- Unit: Waul's Legion
- Battles/wars: American Civil War; Battle of Tupelo

George McCormick (October 12, 1841 – November 5, 1905) was an American lawyer and politician. A Democrat, he was the Texas Attorney General from 1874 to 1876. He was also a veteran of the American Civil War.

== Early life and military service ==
McCormick was born on October 12, 1841, in Fauquier County, Virginia, the son of W. B. McCormick and Ann Virginia (née Millan) McCormick. In December 1858, he and his parents moved to Colorado County, Texas.

In early 1861, McCormick enlisted into the Confederate States Army at Galveston. Serving under Ebenezar B. Nichols, he remained in Galveston and fortified the city. In fall 1862, he transferred to Waul's Legion, as a cavalryman. Among other battles, he fought in the Battle of Tupelo, in which he was wounded and captured, the wound leading to a leg amputation. He retired from the military in 1864.

== Career ==
In 1865, McCormick returned to Colorado County. There, he read law under Cook & Collier and was admitted to the bar. In June 1866, he was elected clerk of Colorado County, but in 1869 was removed from office by Governor Elisha M. Pease for resufal to recite the Ironclad Oath. He then formed a partnership with Robert Levi Foard and Wells Thompson. In 1870, he was made district attorney of Colorado County.

McCormick was a Democrat, with the Austin American-Statesman describing him as a Jacksonian democrat. He opposed tariffs and the gold standard. He represented Colorado and Lavaca Counties in the 1875 Texas Constitutional Convention, during which he advocated for public education, the only Democrat to support such.

In 1876, McCormick was appointed assistant to the Texas Attorney General by Governor Richard Coke, serving under Hannibal Boone. He served as Attorney General from 1874 to 1876, refusing to run in the following election. In the 1870s, Governor Richard B. Hubbard chose him to inspect Caney Creek, during which he discovered that shoreline trees were being cut down and dropped into the water, causing a hinderance to seafare; the discovery saved thousands of acres of land from being used by contractors.

In 1880, McCormick moved to Columbus, where he partnered with Lyle G. Logue. In 1882, he, alongside 69 other lawyers, founded the State Bar of Texas. From 1884 to 1892, he was the judge of Texas's 25th district court.

== Personal life and death ==
In 1871, McCormick married Myrah Thatcher, with whom he had five children. His son, George McCormick Jr., was an engineer and inventor. He died on November 5, 1905, aged 64, in Columbus, from illness, and was buried on November 7, at Odd Fellows Cemetery, in Weimar. In 1968, his house in Columbus was proposed to be given the status of Recorded Texas Historic Landmark.
