= George W. Clark (Texas politician) =

American politician and lawyer (1841–1918)

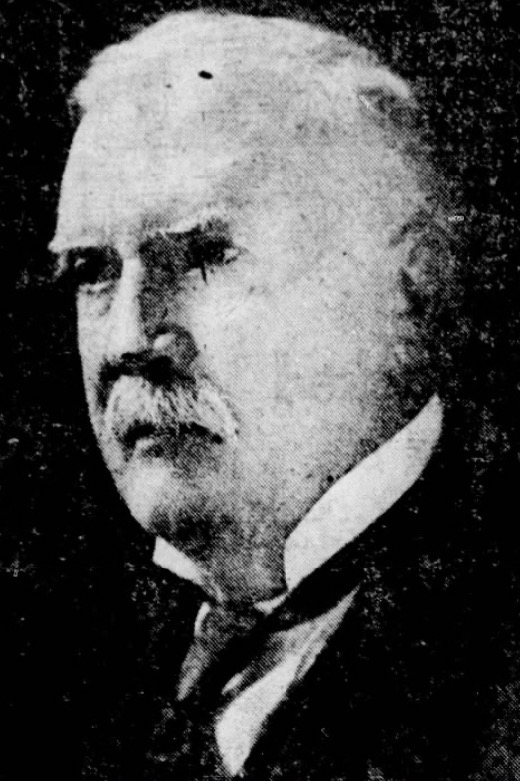

Acting Secretary of State of Texas
- In office January 17, 1874 – January 27, 1874
- Preceded by: James Pearson Newcomb
- Succeeded by: Alfred Wesley DeBerry

Texas Attorney General
- In office 1874–1876
- Preceded by: William Alexander
- Succeeded by: Hannibal Boone

Judge of the Texas Court of Criminal Appeals
- In office November 1879 – October 1880

Personal details
- Born: July 18, 1841 Eutaw, Alabama, US
- Died: March 28, 1918 (aged 76) Waco, Texas, US
- Resting place: Oakwood Cemetery
- Party: Democratic
- Occupation: Politician, lawyer, soldier

Military service
- Allegiance: Confederate States of America
- Branch/service: Confederate States Army
- Years of service: 1861–1865
- Rank: Lieutenant colonel
- Unit: 11th Alabama Infantry Regiment
- Battles/wars: American Civil War; Battle of Chancellorsville; Battle of Gettysburg

George W. Clark (July 18, 1841 – March 28, 1918) was an American politician, lawyer, and soldier. A Democrat, he was the Secretary of State of Texas and the Texas Attorney General.

== Early life and military service ==
Clark was born on July 18, 1841, in Eutaw, Alabama, the youngest of seven children born to James Blair Clark and Mary (née Erwin) Clark. He matriculated at the University of Alabama in October 1857, studying there until April 1861, leaving after the Battle of Fort Sumter occurred.

In June 1861, during the American Civil War, Clark enlisted as a private into the Confederate States Army. He eventually became a junior lieutenant of the 11th Alabama Infantry Regiment, achieving the final rank of lieutenant colonel. He fought at the Battle of Chancellorsville and the Battle of Gettysburg, among other battles. He was wounded in July 1863 and August 1864. By the end of the war, he was at Danville, Virginia.

== Career ==
After the war, Clark read law under his father, being admitted to the bar in October 1866. From 1865 to 1867, he was a justice of the peace. In January 1867, he sailed to Galveston, Texas, moving about Texas for several months before returning to Alabama, again moving to Texas in December of that year. The yellow fever epidemic and the increased power of African American residents due to the Reconstruction era delayed Clark's move to Texas. Back in Texas, he moved to Waco, then to Weatherford for a year, and in December 1868, returned to Waco.

Clark was a Democrat. In 1872, he served in the State Democratic Committee. He encouraged Richard Coke to run for Governor. He was the acting Secretary of State of Texas from January 17, 1874, to January 27, 1874. From 1874 to 1876, he was the Texas Attorney General, and between 1876 and 1878, revised the Texas laws. From November 1879 to October 1880, he was judge of the Texas Court of Criminal Appeals. In spring and summer 1887, he led a successful campaign opposing a Prohibition amendment to the Texas Constitution. He was an unsuccessful candidate in the 1892 Texas gubernatorial election. He, of an "irregular" political faction, was steadfast in his beliefs.

After serving in public office, Clark returned to practicing law in Waco, becoming an attorney for rail companies.

== Personal life and death ==
On November 4, 1874, Clark married Mary Pauline Johns, with whom he had two children. His eyesight began worsening by 1908. He died on March 18, 1918, aged 76, in Waco, after six weeks of illness, and was buried on March 29, at Oakwood Cemetery, in Waco.
