= Charles K. Bell =

American politician (1853–1913)

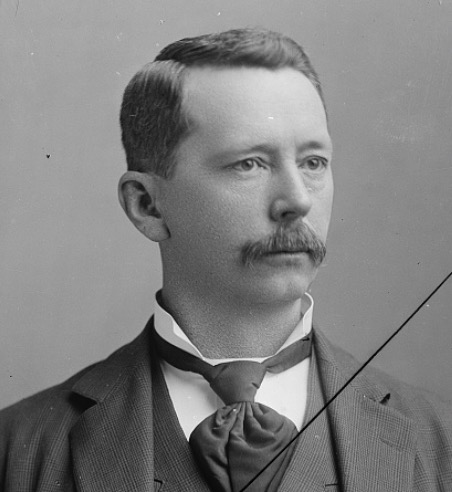
- Portrait of Bell by Charles Milton Bell, taken between February 1894 and February 1901

Member of the U.S. House of Representatives from Texas's 8th district
- In office March 4, 1893 – March 3, 1897
- Preceded by: Littleton W. Moore
- Succeeded by: S. W. T. Lanham

Texas Attorney General
- In office May 1901 – 1904
- Governor: Joseph D. Sayers
- Preceded by: Thomas Slater Smith
- Succeeded by: Robert V. Davidson

Member of the Texas Senate from the 23rd district
- In office 1884–1888

Personal details
- Born: Charles Keith Bell; April 18, 1853 Chattanooga, Tennessee, US
- Died: April 22, 1913 (aged 60) Fort Worth, Texas, US
- Resting place: Oakwood Cemetery
- Relations: Reese Bowen Brabson (uncle)

Charles Keith Bell (April 18, 1853 – April 22, 1913) was an American politician and lawyer. A Democrat, he was a member of the United States House of Representatives from Texas, later being Attorney General of Texas.

== Biography ==
Bell was born on April 18, 1853, in Chattanooga, Tennessee, the son of William S. Bell and Elizabeth Douglas (née Keith) Bell. His uncle was Reese Bowen Brabson. Educated at public schools, he studied at Sewanee: The University of the South and at the University of Tennessee, the latter from 1867 to 1869, studying philosophy.

In 1871, Bell moved to Texas, returning to Tennessee in 1873, reading law in the latter. He was admitted to the bar in 1874, after which he began practicing in Hamilton. In 1876, he was prosecutor of Hamilton County, and from 1880 to 1882, was its district attorney. From 1888 to 1890, he was judge of the 29th Texas District Court.

Bell was a Democrat, though The Political Graveyard erroneously identifies him as a Republican. He was a delegate to the 1884 Democratic National Convention. He was a member of the Texas Senate from 1884 to 1888, representing the 23rd district.

Ideologically, he was liberal and supported Prohibition. He supported antitrust policy, helping to recover over $100 million in loans to the federal government while in Congress.

Bell was a member of the United States House of Representatives, from March 4, 1893, to March 3, 1897. representing Texas's 8th district; The Political Graveyard erroneously states he represented the 27th district, which did not exist at the time. He was not nominated for the following election. From May 1901 to 1904, he was Texas Attorney General, having been appointed by Governor Joseph D. Sayers. He was an unsuccessful candidate in the 1906 Texas gubernatorial election.

In 1893, Bell moved to Fort Worth, where he returned to practicing law. For a time, he was chairman of the city's YMCA. In 1906, he married Florence Smith, with whom he had a son. He was Anglician and a Freemason. He died on April 22, 1913, aged 60, in Fort Worth, and was buried at Oakwood Cemetery.

Legal offices
Preceded by Thomas Slater Smith	Texas Attorney General; 1901–1904	Succeeded by Robert V. Davidson
U.S. House of Representatives
Preceded by Littleton W. Moore	Member of the U.S. House of Representatives from Texas's 8th congressional district 1893–1897	Succeeded by S. W. T. Lanham
