= William M. Walton =

American politician (1832–1915)

William Martin Walton

12th Attorney General of Texas
- In office 1866–1867
- Governor: James W. Throckmorton
- Preceded by: William Alexander
- Succeeded by: Ezekiel B. Turner

Chairman of Texas Democratic Party
- In office 1866–1872

Personal details
- Born: 17 January 1832 Canton, Mississippi
- Died: 1 July 1915 (aged 83) Austin, Texas
- Party: Democratic
- Spouse: Letitia Ann Watkins
- Profession: Lawyer, Politician, Author

Military service
- Allegiance: Confederate States
- Branch/service: Confederate States Army
- Rank: Major
- Unit: 21st Texas Cavalry
- Battles/wars: American Civil War

William Martin Walton (January 17, 1832 – July 1, 1915) was a lawyer in Austin, Texas. During the Civil War, Walton served as a major in the Confederate Army. After the war, he was elected attorney general of the state and also headed the state Democratic Party. At the time of his death, Walton was one of the most respected lawyers in Texas.

== Early life ==
William Martin "Buck" Walton, the son of Samuel Walker Walton and Mary Wilkerson Lowe Walton, was born near Canton, Mississippi, on January 17, 1832. Walton had three brothers (George, Philip and Jesse) and a sister, Mary. "Buck" was a nickname given to Walton by his brother, George, and was used throughout his life. In 1834, the Walton family moved to Carroll County, newly created from Indian lands in the Choctaw Session. When Walton was just seven years old, Samuel Walker Walton died. His widow Mary married Benjamin C. Strange. Benjamin and Mary Strange and the family moved to Texas in 1844, where the four Walton boys stayed only one year before going back to Mississippi, where Walton received a share of his late father's estate. Mr. Strange died in 1848 and Mary in 1849.

When he was seventeen, Walton was appointed deputy district clerk and in about two years saved enough money to go to the University of Virginia, where he studied law. He did not graduate before returning to Carroll County. In Carrollton, Will began to read law, studying with the firm of William Cothran and James Z. George. In the fall of 1852, he was granted his license and given permission to practice law by a special enabling act of the legislature since he was not yet 21. After his licensing, Walton and George, his only surviving brother, decided to sell their father's land and move to Austin, Texas.

While in Carrollton, Walton met and grew to love seventeen-year-old Lettie Watkins, whose parents, Dr. Thomas A. Watkins and Sarah Epes Fitzgerald Watkins, had a plantation nearby. He asked Lettie to marry him and go with him to Texas, but her parents withheld their permission. Despondent, young Walton started on his way out of Mississippi, but, after a day or two, came back to Carrollton to ask again, resulting in a secret engagement.

== Move to Texas and Civil War ==
William M. Walton arrived in Austin on February 19, 1853, just a month past his twenty-first birthday. He immediately took the job of deputy clerk in the District Clerk's office to familiarize himself with the practice of law in Texas. In July 1853, Andrew J. Hamilton, later governor of Texas, offered him a partnership that continued until Hamilton was elected to the U.S. Congress in 1858. Walton received a letter from Lettie early in the winter telling him to come for her, that she would marry him with or without her father's consent. He arrived in Carrollton on February 6, 1854, and he and Lettie were married on February 9.

With the start of the Civil War, the courts in Texas ceased operation and Walton took work as Governor Francis Lubbock's private secretary. He and Lettie had, by this time, a family of three young sons, Newton Samuel Walton born in 1855, Early Watkins Walton born in 1857 and George Longstreet Walton born in 1860. On March 2, 1862, believing he had a duty to fight against the United States, Walton enlisted in the Confederate Army. Walton's company, Co. B of the 21st Texas Cavalry Regiment, also known as the Texas Lancers, elected him 1st lieutenant.

The 21st Texas Cavalry saw action in the Trans-Mississippi Theater. As a lieutenant, Walton led scouting raids in the vicinity of Helena, Arkansas. In the spring of 1863, he commanded Maj. Gen. John S. Marmaduke's vanguard in the Battle of Cape Girardeau. Walton was later promoted to major and attached to the staff of Lt. Gen. Theophilus H. Holmes, commander of the Trans-Mississippi Department, and stationed at Little Rock, Arkansas. After the Battle of Helena and the Confederate evacuation of Little Rock, Walton took part in the Red River Campaign, leading a company in the battles of Pleasant Hill and Yellow Bayou. Walton's last assignment was with Brig. Gen. Alexander Watkins Terrell in southern Louisiana. Walton left the army without leave when he learned his wife was severely ill, following the birth of their daughter, Sarah, on October 24, 1864. He was never punished, because of the breakup of the Confederacy. In the final months of his life, Maj. Walton completed a manuscript of his experiences during the Civil War. He called it The Epitome of my Life.

When Major Walton returned to Austin, he found his wife had made a miraculous recovery. Walton sent his family to live with his in-laws in Mississippi, amidst fears of Union occupation during Reconstruction. He took odd jobs as a clerk to pay the bills, as ex-Confederates were not then allowed to practice law. Early in 1866, Walton and W.P. DeNormandie, who was absent from the South during the war and thus allowed to practice, formed a partnership, specializing in land claims. Business in Austin for lawyers was scarce in 1865, and in addition to his other work, Walton wrote Austin news for the Houston Telegraph newspaper, including the proceedings of the 1866 Texas Constitutional Convention.

== Political career ==
In 1866, Walton entered his name for District Judge of the 2nd Judicial District. However, in the middle of May, the party committee asked him to withdraw his name to give the other conservative candidate, John Ireland, later a governor, a better chance against the Republican candidate. He instead ran for attorney general after the original Democratic candidate withdrew. Walton won the election by a sizable majority. Among his other duties, Walton traveled to Washington, D.C., to argue before the Supreme Court. He was given leave, by a joint resolution of the state legislature, to bring his family from Mississippi on the way home.

In 1867, the Reconstruction Acts, which were passed over President Andrew Johnson's veto, effectively shut down the governments of most of the southern states and removed Confederate veterans from elected office. The Democratic administration of James W. Throckmorton, of which Walton was a part, was replaced with a Republican government under Elisha M. Pease and Texas came under military occupation.

Walton served as the chairman of the state Democratic executive committee from 1866 to 1872, during Reconstruction and the unpopular tenure of Republican Governor Edmund J. Davis. Walton helped form a coalition of conservative and moderate elements to combat the electoral power of the Radical Republicans and retake control of the state government. This came to pass with the election of Richard Coke in 1873.

Walton intended to run for attorney general again in the 1876 elections. At the Texas Democratic Convention, in January of that year, he had a very large following and his nomination seemed assured, but when he learned that his opponent, Hannibal H. Boone, was a crippled Confederate veteran in need of a steady income to support his large family, Walton withdrew from the race. In a letter to his son, Walton wrote:

the scene was the wildest you ever saw. There were 1500 men present in the house. They threw up their hats, laughed, cried, caught me in their arms, hugged me and at one time, I was really afraid they would kill me in their furious enthusiasm over my act ... ... it was a grand scene.

== Later life ==
After Walton's law license was reinstated, he formed a partnership with John A. Green in 1870. Robert J. Hill joined the firm and the name became Walton, Green and Hill. In 1882, Major Green moved to San Antonio to practice with his son. Newton Walton entered the partnership and the firm name became Walton, Hill and Walton. When Newton died in 1894, the name was Walton and Hill and then returned to W.M. Walton with Mr. Hill's death in 1899.

Arguably, Walton's most famous client was Wild West gunman Ben Thompson. Walton participated in Thompson's defense when, in 1882, while Austin City Marshal, Thompson killed San Antonio theater owner Jack Harris. Walton later wrote Thompson's biography, The Life and Adventures of Ben Thompson.

Walton retired in 1907 after three bouts of severe illness. He spent his days entertaining visitors on the front porch of his Austin home. Mrs. Walton died on June 23, 1914, and her husband followed on July 1, 1915. They were both buried in the Walton family plot at Austin's old Oakwood Cemetery.

Resolutions by the Travis County Bar Association ordered that his portrait, "which adorns the District Courtroom, be draped in mourning". The portrait of William Walton still hangs today in a courtroom in the Travis County courthouse.

Frank Johnson, the author of Texas and Texans, called Major Walton the Nestor of the Austin bar and, in commenting on his ability as a lawyer, quoted David B. Culberson, "As a trial lawyer I had rather go against any lawyer in the state than 'Buck' Walton." Johnson also wrote that, "Major Walton's specialties in the law were land and murder cases, and without specifying cases of either sort it is enough to say that at the time of his retirement from the bar he was credited with more cases of the kind than any lawyer in Texas." Throughout his long and active career, Walton was renowned for his speaking ability, both in the courtroom and on the campaign trail, speaking for his chosen candidates and causes. H. M. Garwood, once regent of the University of Texas and president of the Texas State Bar Association, named Major Walton as one of Texas' greatest lawyers in a speech entitled "Oratory, a Classic Tradition". "Walton was universally learned, constantly engaged in the trial of great criminal cases, ... turned with ease to the intricacies of the federal equity docket or the exposition of the Spanish law in old land grant cases."

Legal offices
Preceded by William Alexander	Attorney General of Texas; 1866-1867	Succeeded by Ezekiel B. Turner
