= Thomas J. Jennings =

American lawyer and politician (1801–1881)

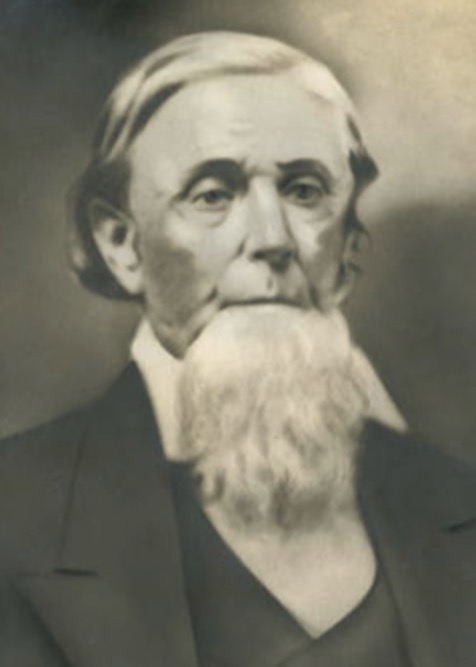

Texas Attorney General
- In office 1852–1856
- Preceded by: Ebenezer Allen
- Succeeded by: James Willie

Member of the Texas House of Representatives from the 21st district
- In office November 2, 1857 – November 7, 1859 Serving with Thomas J. Johnson
- Preceded by: Benjamin Franklin Selman
- Succeeded by: Samuel Turner Harrison

Personal details
- Born: Thomas Jefferson Jennings; October 20, 1801 Shenandoah County, Virginia, US
- Died: September 23, 1881 (aged 79) Fort Worth, Texas, US
- Party: Independent
- Children: Tom R. Jennings
- Occupation: Lawyer, politician

Military service
- Allegiance: Confederate States of America
- Branch/service: Confederate States Army
- Years of service: Until fall 1861
- Battles/wars: American Civil War

Thomas Jefferson Jennings (October 20, 1801 – September 23, 1881) was an American lawyer and politician.

Born in Shenandoah County, Virginia, Jennings graduated from Transylvania University and practiced law. He moved to the Republic of Texas in 1840. There, he served as the Texas Attorney General and was a member of the Texas House of Representatives.

== Early life and education ==
Jennings was born on October 20, 1801, in Shenandoah County, Virginia, the son of William Jennings, a member of the Virginia General Assembly, and Mariam Howard (née Smith) Jennings. He was presumably named for Thomas Jefferson.

Around age ten, Jennings and his parents moved to Indiana, where his father purchased 5,000 acres of land. He then moved to Louisville, Kentucky, followed by Christian County; he lived in Todd County for some time.

Until around age 17, Jennings attended public school. He then spent two or three years working as a store clerk and educator in order to fund his college tuition. He graduated from Transylvania University in 1824 or 1825, as valedictorian.

== Early career and politics ==
Having read law while teaching in Paris, Tennessee, Jennings was admitted to the bar in 1827. For around two years, he partnered with his brother, Dudley S. Jennings, afterwards partnering with Berry Gillespie in Huntingdon. In 1836, he moved to Yazoo City, Mississippi, then to San Augustine, Texas in spring 1840, and Nacogdoches in fall of the same year.

In Nacogdoches, Jennings partnered with J. M. Ardrey and William B. Ochiltree. He was the Texas Attorney General from 1852 to 1856, not running in the following election. In 1857, he moved to a plantation near Alto; he owned five slaves in 1850, and six in 1860.

Jennings was an independent politician. He served in the Texas House of Representatives, from November 2, 1857, to November 7, 1859, representing the 21st district. While serving, he was chairman of the House Judiciary Committee, and was a member of the Committees on Education; on Privileges and Elections; on Public Debt; and on Rules. He voted against founding the University of Texas at Austin, believing Austin to be a morally depraved city.

== Later career and personal life ==
Jennings participated in the 1861 secession convention. During the American Civil War, he enlisted into the Confederate States Army, but suffered a paralyzing stroke in fall 1861 which incompacitated him for 18 months. In fall 1864, he moved to Tyler, practicing law, in partnership with Benjamin Thomas Selman, then with his son, Tom R. Jennings. Throughout his career, he also partnered with Stockton P. Donley, George F. Moore, and Reuben A. Reeves. He retired in 1875, and in 1877, moved to Fort Worth. He was also a landowner.

In January 1844, Jennings married Sarah G. Mason, with whom he had three sons, including Tom, who became a politician. He was not of a specific faith, and was a member of the Freemasons and the Independent Order of Odd Fellows. He died on September 23, 1881, aged 79, in Fort Worth, from illness. Jennings Avenue, in Fort Worth, was named for him.
