= Malcolm D. Graham =

American politician (1827–1878)

Malcolm Daniel Graham

Texas State Senate
- In office 1857–1857

Texas State Attorney General
- In office 1858–1860
- Governor: Sam Houston
- Preceded by: James Willie
- Succeeded by: George M. Flournoy

Representative from Texas to the Confederate Congress
- President: Jefferson Davis

Personal details
- Born: July 6, 1827
- Died: October 6, 1878 (aged 51)
- Party: Democrat

Malcolm Daniel Graham (July 6, 1827 – October 6, 1878) was a Confederate politician. Born in Alabama and a lawyer by profession, he moved to Texas in 1854 and was a state senator there at the start of the American Civil War. He represented Texas at the First Confederate Congress and served in the Confederate Army, being captured by the Union Army and imprisoned on Johnson's Island. After the war, he moved back to Alabama as he was not allowed to practice law in Texas, and died in Montgomery.

== Life ==
Malcolm Daniel Graham, who can also be found listed as Malcolm Duncan, was born on July 6, 1827, in Autauga County, Alabama, the son of John G. Graham, a native of North Carolina. After graduating from Transylvania University with a degree in law, he practiced as a lawyer in Wetumpka. He was elected to be clerk of the Alabama House of Representatives in 1853 before moving to Henderson, Texas, in 1854. He served in the Texas State Senate for one term from between 1857 and 1859, as Attorney General from 1858 to 1860, and as a presidential elector for John C. Breckinridge in 1860.

At the start of the American Civil War, he was a delegate to the Texas Secession Convention and was signer of the Ordinance of Secession. He represented the state in the First Confederate Congress from 1862 to 1864, was appointed judge advocate by Jefferson Davis and was a colonel in the Confederate Army. He was captured in 1864 by the Union Army and imprisoned on Johnson's Island until the end of the conflict. After the war, as he was not allowed to practice law in Texas without a pardon, he moved back to Alabama and settled in Montgomery. He resumed his law practice, also serving as the president of the executive committee of the Conservative Democrat Party.

He was married to Amelia Cunningham Ready, with whom he had two sons. He died on October 6, 1878, and is buried in Oakwood Cemetery in Montgomery, Alabama.

Legal offices
Preceded by James Willie	Attorney General of Texas; 1858-1860	Succeeded by George M. Flournoy
