= John D. Templeton =

American lawyer and politician (1845–1893)

Secretary of State of Texas
- In office January 23, 1879 – January 22, 1881
- Governor: Oran Milo Roberts
- Preceded by: A. J. Searcy
- Succeeded by: Thornton Hardie Bowman

Texas Attorney General
- In office 1882–1886
- Preceded by: James H. McLeary
- Succeeded by: Jim Hogg

Personal details
- Born: John Dickson Templeton; August 21, 1845 Henderson County, Tennessee, US
- Died: April 24, 1893 (aged 47) Fort Worth, Texas, US
- Resting place: Texas State Cemetery
- Party: Democratic
- Parent: Thomas Wilson Templeton (father)
- Occupation: Lawyer, politician

Military service
- Allegiance: Confederate States of America
- Branch/service: Confederate States Army
- Rank: Private
- Unit: 10th Texas Cavalry Regiment
- Battles/wars: American Civil War; Siege of Corinth

John Dickson Templeton (August 21, 1845 – April 24, 1893) was an American lawyer and politician. A Democrat, he was the Secretary of State of Texas and the Texas Attorney General.

== Early life ==
Templeton was born on August 21, 1845, in Henderson County, Tennessee, the son of Thomas Wilson Templeton and Elvira Carolina (née Dickson) Templeton. His father was a member of the Texas House of Representatives. In January 1850, he and his parents moved to Rusk County, Texas, and in 1861, to Franklin County. He was educated between Bonham, Clarksville, and Ladonia.

== Career ==
In 1862, during the American Civil War, Templeton enlisted, as a private, into the 10th Texas Cavalry Regiment. He fought in the Siege of Corinth, among other battles, namely in Arkansas, Louisiana, and Mississippi. He returned to Texas following the war, working as a farmer and educator.

Beginning in 1868, Templeton read law under Oran Milo Roberts. He was admitted to the bar in 1870, after which he moved to Fort Worth and began practicing law there. In 1871 and 1872, he was editor of the Fort Worth Democrat. He, alongside four other men, founded a waterworks company to supply Fort Worth with water. He was in partnership with Augustus McKinney Carter for a time.

Templeton was a Democrat. He was the Secretary of State of Texas from January 23, 1879, to January 22, 1881, having been appointed by Governor Roberts. He resigned to return to practicing law. From 1882 to 1886, he was the Texas Attorney General.

== Personal life and death ==
After serving as Attorney General, Templeton returned to practicing law, in Tarrant County. On January 30, 1884, he married Lulu C. Pope He moved to Austin c. 1887. He died on April 24, 1893, aged 47, in Fort Worth, from pneumonia and mastoiditis. He was buried on April 26 or 27, at the Texas State Cemetery.
