= Ezekiel B. Turner =

American judge (1825–1888)

Judge of the United States District Court for the Western District of Texas
- In office November 18, 1880 – June 2, 1888
- Appointed by: Rutherford B. Hayes
- Preceded by: Thomas Howard DuVal
- Succeeded by: Thomas Sheldon Maxey

Attorney General of Texas
- In office 1867–1870
- Governor: Elisha M. Pease; Edmund J. Davis
- Preceded by: William M. Walton
- Succeeded by: William Alexander

Personal details
- Born: Ezekiel B. Turner; May 24, 1825 Putney, Vermont
- Died: June 2, 1888 (aged 63) Austin, Texas
- Education: read law

Ezekiel B. Turner (May 24, 1825 – June 2, 1888) was a United States district judge of the United States District Court for the Western District of Texas.

== Education and career ==
Born in Putney, Vermont, Turner read law to enter the bar in 1848. He became a prosecuting attorney of St. Joseph County, Michigan in 1850, and then a justice of the peace for that county. He was in private practice in Austin, Texas from 1854 to 1861, becoming a prosecuting attorney of Brownsville, Texas in 1863. He was the United States Attorney for the Western District of Texas from 1866 to 1867. He was the Attorney General of Texas from 1867 to 1870, and then served as a Texas Judge, first of the 32nd Judicial District of Texas from 1871 to 1876, and then of the 16th Judicial District of Texas beginning in 1876.

== Federal judicial service ==
Turner received a recess appointment from President Rutherford B. Hayes on November 18, 1880, to a seat on the United States District Court for the Western District of Texas vacated by Judge Thomas Howard DuVal. He was nominated to the same position by President Hayes on December 14, 1880. He was confirmed by the United States Senate on December 20, 1880, and received his commission the same day. His service terminated on June 2, 1888, due to his death in Austin.

== Sources ==
Legal offices
Preceded by William M. Walton	Attorney General of Texas; 1867–1870	Succeeded by William Alexander
Preceded by Thomas Howard DuVal	Judge of the United States District Court for the Western District of Texas; 1880–1888	Succeeded by Thomas Sheldon Maxey
