= Texas Attorney General =

Elected government official of the state of Texas

Attorney General of Texas
- Seal of the Attorney General

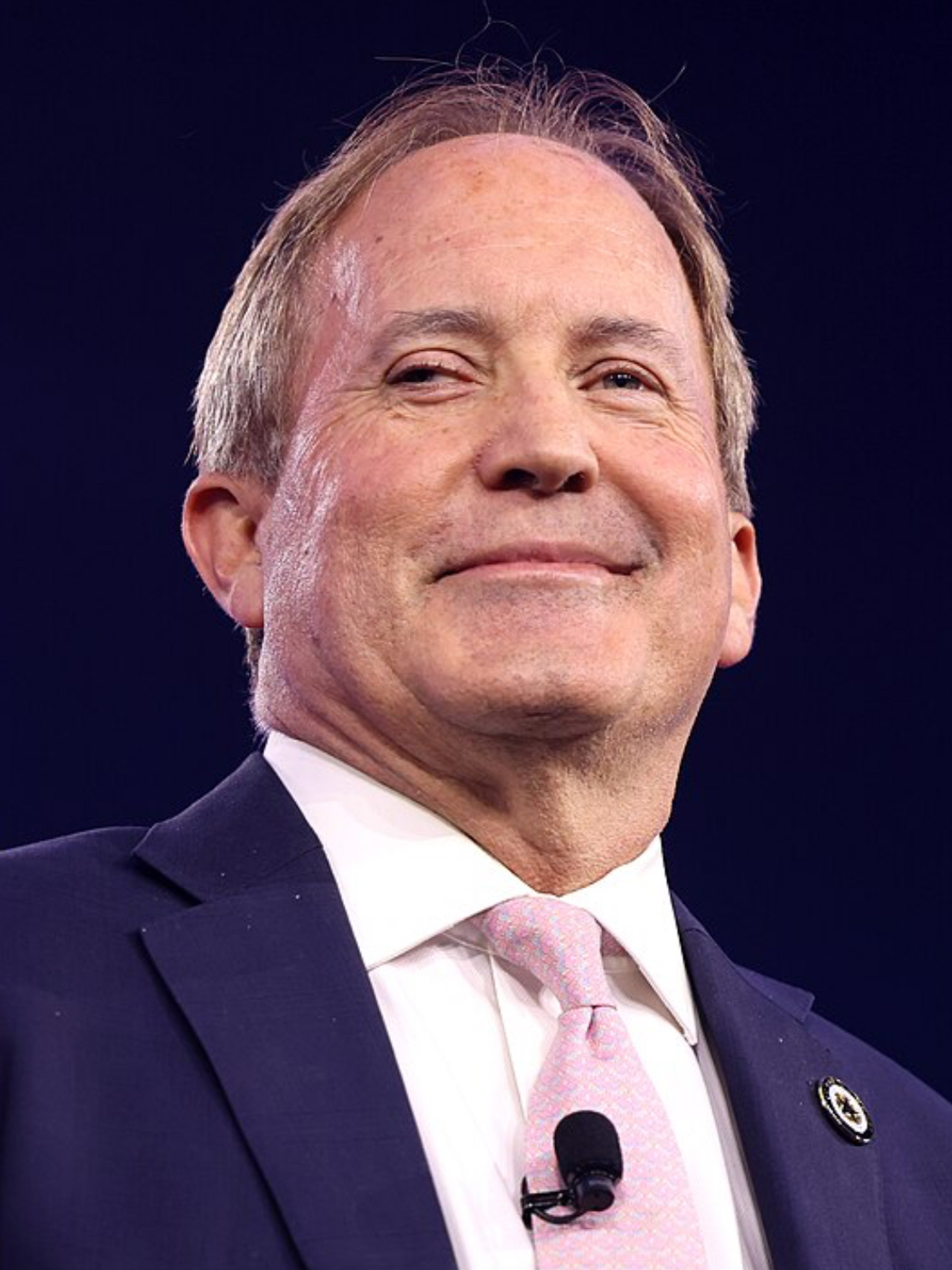
- Incumbent; Ken Paxton since January 5, 2015; Suspended: May 27, 2023 – September 16, 2023
- Executive branch of the Government of Texas
- Style: The Honorable
- Term length: Four years, no term limits
- Inaugural holder: Volney E. Howard
- Formation: Texas Constitution
- Salary: $153,750
- Website: Official website

The Texas attorney general is the chief legal officer of the U.S. state of Texas. The current officeholder, Republican Ken Paxton, has served in the position since January 5, 2015. He returned to office from a suspension on September 18, 2023, and his current term ends on January 1, 2027. Paxton was preceded by Greg Abbott (excluding three interim officeholders) and will be succeeded by Nathan Johnson, the first Democrat to hold the office in 28 years.

== History ==
The office has its origins in British common law and Spanish civil law, and it was first established by executive order in 1836. While the governor was originally appointed to the position, a constitutional amendment in 1850 changed it to an elected office to ensure it was directly accountable to the public. Under the constitution of 1876, the attorney general was officially recognized as one of the seven officials that make up the executive branch of the Texas state government.

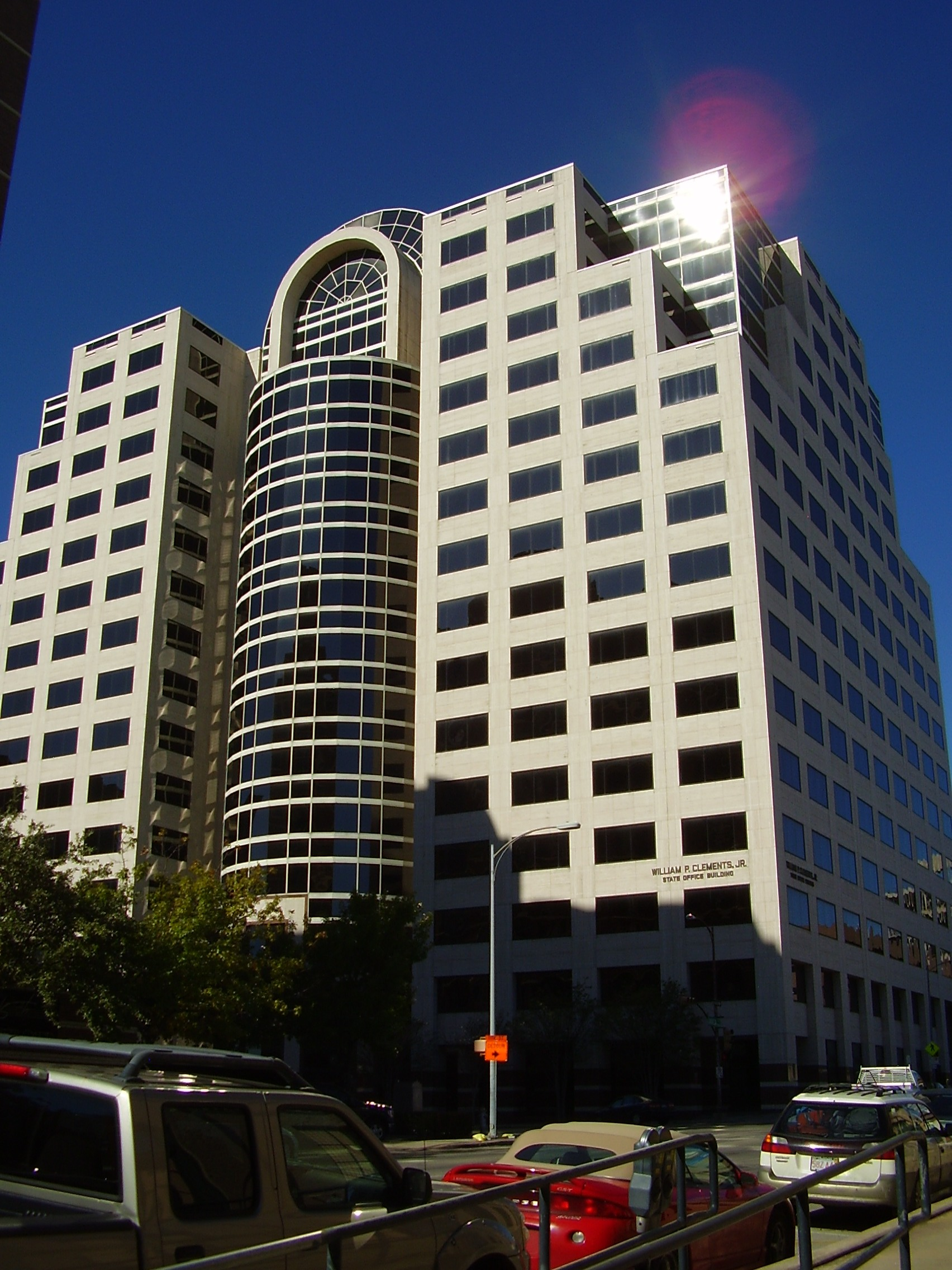
The William P. Clements State Office Building houses some of the Office of the Attorney General.

Attorneys general are elected to four-year terms. In 2013, former attorney general Greg Abbott announced he would run for governor rather than seek reelection. In November 2014, he was elected as the governor of Texas. Ken Paxton defeated former state representative Dan Branch in the Republican primary by a 26% margin and was easily elected in the general election as the 50th attorney general of Texas, (there is a historical dispute whether he is the 50th or 51st attorney general). Paxton was sworn in on January 5, 2015, in the Senate Chamber in the Texas Capitol. Governor Rick Perry, Lieutenant Governor David Dewhurst, United States senator Ted Cruz, and Lieutenant Governor-Elect Dan Patrick all participated in the swearing-in ceremony.

== Duties and responsibilities ==
The attorney general is charged by the state constitution to represent the state in civil litigation and approve public bond issues. There are nearly 2,000 references to the Office of the Attorney General in state laws.

The Office of the Attorney General serves as legal counsel to all boards and agencies of state government, issues legal opinions when requested by the governor, heads of state agencies and other officials and commissions, and defends challenges to state laws and suits against both state agencies and individual employees of the state. They act as the state's attorney, fighting against challenges to state agencies and laws in court, give opinions on how state law should be understood, conduct investigations, and file lawsuits to keep the people in their state safe. Some duties include representing the Director of the Texas Department of Criminal Justice in appeals from criminal convictions in federal courts.

The Texas Constitution gives the attorney general no general law-enforcement powers; instead it, limits their authority in criminal cases to what is dictated by statute. The Texas Legislature has not given the attorney general broad law-enforcement authority, but permits the attorney general to act in criminal cases at the request of prosecutors.

Under state law, opinions may be requested only by certain, including the governor, heads of state agencies, legislative committee chairs, and county and district attorneys. The attorney general must acknowledge a request within 15 days of receiving it and issue the opinion wi th in 180 days, unless the office notifies the requester in writing before that deadline that the opinion will be delayed or not rendered and gives the reasons.

The Office of the Attorney General, Law Enforcement Division conducts criminal investigations and apprehensions including cases involving cyber-crimes such as child pornography, online solicitation of minors, identity theft, election fraud, locating and apprehending convicted sex offenders who have failed to comply with mandated sex offender registration requirements, and conducting digital forensics investigations. However, in certain circumstances, the attorney general has original jurisdiction to prosecute violations of the law, rather than just acting at the request of local prosecution.The Office of the Attorney General also operates the Medicaid Fraud Control Unit which investigates criminal fraud by Medicaid providers, abuse and neglect of patients in health care facilities operated by the Medicaid program, and helps local and federal authorities with prosecutions.

Its child support division is responsible for the establishment and enforcement of child support.

== Officeholders ==
Attorneys general by party affiliation
Party	Attorneys general
Democratic	45
Republican	4
Union	3

Attorneys general in chronological order, showing party affiliation
No.	Image	Name	Term of service	Political party
1		Volney Howard	1846	Democratic
2		John W. Harris	1846–1849	Democratic
3		Henry Percy Brewster	1849–1850	Democratic
4		Andrew Jackson Hamilton	1850	Democratic
5		Ebenezer Allen^{1}	1850–1852	Democratic
6		Thomas J. Jennings	1852–1856	Democratic
7		James Willie	1856–1858	Democratic
8		Malcolm D. Graham	1858–1860	Democratic
9		George M. Flournoy	1860–1862	Democratic
10		Nathan G. Shelley	1862–1864	Democratic
11		Benjamin E. Tarver	1864–1865	Democratic
12		William Alexander	1865–1866	Unionist
13		William M. Walton	1866–1867	Democratic
14		Ezekiel B. Turner	1867–1870	Unionist
15		William Alexander	1870–1874	Republican
16		George W. Clark	1874–1876	Democratic
17		Hannibal Boone	1876–1878	Democratic
18		George McCormick	1878–1880	Democratic
19		James H. McLeary	1880–1882	Democratic
20		John D. Templeton	1882–1886	Democratic
21		Jim Hogg	1886–1890	Democratic
22		Charles Allen Culberson	1890–1894	Democratic
23		Martin McNulty Crane	1894–1898	Democratic
24		Thomas Slater Smith	1898–1901	Democratic
25		Charles K. Bell	1901–1904	Democratic
26		Robert V. Davidson	1904–1910	Democratic
27		Jewel P. Lightfoot	1910–1912	Democratic
28		James D. Walthall	1912–1914	Democratic
29		B. F. Looney	1913–1919	Democratic
30		Calvin Maples Cureton	1919–1921	Democratic
31		Walter Angus Keeling	1921–1925	Democratic
32		Dan Moody	1925–1927	Democratic
33		Claude Pollard^{2}	1927–1929	Democratic
34		Robert L. Bobbitt^{3}	1929–1931	Democratic
35		James V. Allred	1931–1935	Democratic
36		William McCraw	1935–1939	Democratic
37		Gerald Mann	1939–1943	Democratic
38		Grover Sellers	1943–1947	Democratic
39		Price Daniel	1947–1953	Democratic
40		John Ben Shepperd	1953–1957	Democratic
41		Will Wilson	1957–1963	Democratic
42		Waggoner Carr	1963–1967	Democratic
43		Crawford Martin	1967–1972	Democratic
44		John Hill	1973–1979	Democratic
45		Mark White	1979–1983	Democratic
46		Jim Mattox	1983–1991	Democratic
47		Dan Morales	1991–1999	Democratic
48		John Cornyn	1999–2002	Republican
49		Greg Abbott	2002–2015	Republican
50		Ken Paxton Incumbent	2015–present Suspended May 27, 2023 – September 16, 2023	Republican
–		Brent Webster Acting	May 27, 2023 – May 31, 2023; Served during the suspension of Ken Paxton	Republican
–		John Scott Interim	May 31, 2023 – July 14, 2023; Served during the suspension of Ken Paxton	Republican
–		Angela Colmenero Interim	July 14, 2023 – September 16, 2023; Served during the suspension of Ken Paxton	Republican
51		Nathan M. Johnson	Attorney General-elect takes office January 1, 2027	Democratic

== Political prominence ==
Many leading political figures in Texas history have served as attorney general, several of them using the office as a jumping-off place to other offices in the state and national government. Attorneys general James S. Hogg, Charles A. Culberson, Dan Moody, James V. Allred, Price Daniel, Mark White, and Greg Abbott were elected governor. Culberson, Daniel, and John Cornyn were later elected to the United States Senate.

== Notes ==
1. First elected attorney general (AG) of state of Texas; previously elected AG of the Republic of Texas
2. Resigned
3. Appointed
