= George M. Flournoy =

American lawyer and politician (1832–1889)

Texas Attorney General
- In office 1860–1862
- Preceded by: Malcolm D. Graham
- Succeeded by: Nathan George Shelley

Personal details
- Born: November 30, 1832 Louisville, Georgia, US
- Died: September 18, 1889 (aged 56) San Francisco, California, US
- Party: Democratic
- Occupation: Lawyer, politician

Military service
- Allegiance: Confederate States of America
- Branch/service: Confederate States Army
- Rank: Colonel
- Unit: 16th Texas Infantry Regiment
- Battles/wars: American Civil War; Battle of Milliken's Bend; Red River campaign; Camden Expedition; Battle of Jenkins' Ferry

George M. Flournoy (November 30, 1832 – September 18, 1889) was an American lawyer and politician. A Democrat, he was Texas Attorney General from 1860 to 1862.

== Early life and education ==
Flournoy was born on November 30, 1832, in Louisville, Georgia, the son of the son of Marcus A. Flournoy and Margaret (née Shelman) Flournoy. His parents died while he was young, and he worked odd jobs until age 21. He studied at the University of Georgia and in 1853, graduated from a law school in Tuskegee, Alabama.

== Career ==
In 1854, Flournoy moved to Austin, Texas, where he practiced law. A Democrat, he was the Texas Attorney General from 1860 to 1862, resigning to fight in the American Civil War. He called for secession in the case of Abraham Lincoln becoming President. In 1860, he helped organize a convention to discuss secession, serving as a delegate to the convention from January 28 to February 4, 1861. He cowrote Texas's declaration of secession.

In early 1862, Flournoy helped create the 16th Texas Infantry Regiment, serving as a colonel of the unit. He and his unit participated in the Battle of Milliken's Bend; the Red River campaign; the Camden Expedition; and the Battle of Jenkins' Ferry. The unit resigned on May 26, 1865, in Galveston.

After surrendering, Flournoy escaped to Mexico City for some time, where he served under Maximilian I of Mexico, later practicing law in Córdoba, Veracruz. He moved to Galveston in 1876, and to San Francisco in 1878, practicing law in both. In 1879, he formed a partnership with John B. Mhoon, son-in-law of Samuel B. McKee. He was a delegate to numerous Texas state conventions. Ideologically, he supported centralization.

== Personal life and death ==
In 1854, Flournoy married Eugenia Haralson. She later died, and on July 1, 1858, married Louisa Virginia Holman. He had three children: one from his first marriage and two from his second. Raised Protestant, he later converted to Catholicism. He died on September 18, 1889, aged 56, in San Francisco, from Bright's disease. He was originally buried at Calvary Cemetery in San Francisco, later being moved to Holy Cross Cemetery, in Colma.
