= Benjamin E. Tarver =

American lawyer and politician (1802–1879)

Texas Attorney General
- In office 1864–1865
- Preceded by: Nathan George Shelley
- Succeeded by: William Alexander

Member of the Texas House of Representatives
- In office November 5, 1849 – July 21, 1850
- Preceded by: District established
- Succeeded by: James E. Shepard
- Constituency: 35th district
- In office November 3, 1851 – November 7, 1853
- Preceded by: Darwin Massey Stapp
- Succeeded by: Darwin Massey Stapp
- Constituency: 39th district
- In office November 5, 1855 – February 4, 1856
- Preceded by: Richard Johnson Swearingen
- Succeeded by: Albert Gallatin Haynes and A. M. M. Upshaw
- Constituency: 49th district

Personal details
- Born: Benjamin Edward Tarver; May 1, 1802 Wake County, North Carolina, US
- Died: April 22, 1879 (aged 76) Brenham, Texas, US
- Party: Independent
- Occupation: Lawyer, politician

Benjamin Edward Tarver (May 1, 1802 – April 22, 1879) was an American lawyer and politician. He was a member of the Texas House of Representatives and was the Texas Attorney General

== Biography ==
Tarver was born on May 1, 1802, in Wake County, North Carolina, the son of Benjamin A. Tarver and Hannah (née Smith) Tarver. He later moved to Lebanon, Tennessee, and in 1852 moved to Texas. There, he practiced law in Brenham, Texas, where he owned a farm nearby. In 1846 and 1847, he was in partnership with Barry Gillespie.

Tarver was an independent politician. He was a member of the Texas House of Representatives from November 5, 1849, to July 21, 1850, again from November 3, 1851, to November 7, 1853, and finally from November 5, 1855, to February 4, 1856. In order of his three terms, he represented the 35th district, the 39th district, and the 49th district. He was the Texas Attorney General in 1864 and 1865.

While in the House, Tarver was chairman of the Committee on the Judiciary, and was a member of the Committees on Claims and Accounts; on Division of the Supreme Court; on Internal Improvements; on Judicial Districts; on Public Debt; on Rules; and on Slaves and Slavery.

Tarver married Louisa James Morriss, with whom he had at least three children. He died on April 22, 1879, aged 76, in Brenham, and was buried at the Brenham Masonic Cemetery beside his wife.
