= Stephen Crosby =

American politician (1808–1869)

- Born: 1808; South Carolina, U.S.
- Died: August 5, 1869 (aged 60–61); Austin, Texas, U.S.
- Resting place: Oakwood Cemetery
- Occupation: Politician
- Political party: Democratic Party; Know Nothing Party
- Spouse: Eliza Green
- Children: Charles Adolphus Crosby

Stephen Crosby (1808–1869) was an American politician. He served as the commissioner of the United States General Land Office for Texas in the 1850s and 1860s. He is the namesake of Crosby County, Texas.

== Early life ==
Stephen Crosby was born in 1808 in South Carolina.

== Career ==
Crosby worked on a steamboat on the Alabama River in the 1830s. He moved to Texas in 1840 and joined the Democratic Party.

In 1851, he was elected as a commissioner of the Texas General Land Office. He served in this capacity until 1858. He ran again as a member of the Know Nothing Party, but he lost the election. Nevertheless, he served again as Commissioner as a Democrat until he was dismissed in 1867.

== Personal life ==
Crosby married Eliza Green. They had a son, Charles Adolphus Crosby. They resided in Austin, Texas.

== Death ==
Crosby died of a laudanum overdose on August 5, 1869, in Austin, Texas. Crosby County, Texas, was named in his honor.
