= Ebenezer Allen (Texas politician) =

American politician (1804–1863)

Ebenezer C. Allen (April 8, 1804 – 1863) was a Texian and American businessman who served as a secretary of state and attorney general of the Republic of Texas. He was also the attorney general of the State of Texas. He was an early Texas railroad promoter.

== Early life ==
Allen was born in Newport, New Hampshire, in 1804 to David and Hannah (Wilcox) Allen.

== Legal career and move to Texas ==
He attended Dartmouth College, graduating in 1826. Allen moved to Orono, Maine, and married Sylvina Morse in 1833. He practiced law there for a time before he went to Galveston, Texas. He arrived during the Texas Revolution and practiced law in Galveston.

== Official of the Republic of Texas ==
On December 9, 1844, Allen was elected Attorney General of the Republic of Texas. He served under President Anson Jones, resigning in July 1845. He then served as acting Secretary of State, during the absence of Ashbel Smith, assisting with the annexation negotiations with the United States Government.

== Later career ==
Allen was the primary business leader of the Galveston and Red River Railroad Company when the State of Texas granted the company a charter in 1848. Later the company changed its name to the Houston and Texas Central Railway in the 1850s and Allen continued to lead the company.

In 1850, Allen was elected Attorney General as a Democrat, serving under Governor Peter Hansborough Bell from 1850 to 1853. He was the first state of Texas Attorney General to be elected, as this position had previously been filled by appointment.

In 1861, with Texas' secession from the United States, Allen entered the service of the Confederate States of America. He died in Richmond, Virginia, in 1863.

== Memorials ==
The city of Allen, Texas, which was founded when the Houston and Texas Central Railway built a depot there, was named for Ebenezer Allen.

Political offices
| Preceded by George W. Terrell | Attorney General of the Republic of Texas; 1844–1845 | Succeeded by William Beck Ochiltree |
| Preceded by Andrew Jackson Hamilton | Attorney General of Texas; 1850–1853 | Succeeded by Thomas J. Jennings |
