= William Alexander (Texas politician) =

American lawyer and politician (1819–1882)

Texas Attorney General
- In office December 11, 1865 – October 1866
- Preceded by: Benjamin E. Tarver
- Succeeded by: William M. Walton
- In office July 11, 1870 – 1874
- Preceded by: Ezekiel B. Turner
- Succeeded by: George W. Clark

Personal details
- Born: 1819 Woodford County, Kentucky, US
- Died: February 16, 1882 (aged 62) Austin, Texas, US
- Occupation: Lawyer, politician

William Alexander (1819 – February 16, 1882) was an American lawyer and politician. He was the Texas Attorney General for two nonconsecutive terms.

== Biography ==
Alexander was born in 1819, in Woodford County, Kentucky. His family was active in agriculture and livestock raising. He studied at Centre College and Yale University. Having read law in Frankfort, he moved to Galveston, Texas in 1846, where he began practicing. In 1847, he moved to Austin.

An opponent of secession, Alexander lived in Mexico through the American Civil War, practicing law there. From December 11, 1865, to October 1866, he served as the Texas Attorney General, having been appointed by Governor Andrew Jackson Hamilton. He was reappointed by Charles Griffin, but Alexander resigned due to believing the 1866 Constitution of Texas to be illegitimate.

Alexander was again appointed Attorney General by Governor Edmund J. Davis, serving from July 11, 1870, to 1874. In 1874, Alexander returned to practicing law in Austin. He believed the Reconstruction era to have been ineffective, as black citizens were not given enough power. At a political convention, he described Texas as a lawless land where people had to defend themselves.

Alexander died on February 16, 1882, aged 62, in Austin.
