= James H. McLeary =

American judge (1845–1914)

James H. McLeary (July 27, 1845 – January 5, 1914) was an American lawyer and politician who served as the attorney general of Texas from 1880 to 1882 and as a justice of the Territorial Montana Supreme Court from 1886 to 1888 (appointed by President Grover Cleveland). He also served as an associate justice of the Supreme Court of Puerto Rico.

== Early life, education, and military service ==
Born in Smith County, Tennessee, McLeary's family moved to Texas in 1850s.

He attended Soule University before serving with the Confederate States Army from 1861 to 1865. He received a B.A. degree from Washington and Lee University in 1868 and then a law degree from its law school in 1869. He was admitted to the Texas bar in 1869.

== Political and judicial career ==
He was elected to the Texas Legislature in 1873 and as Texas Attorney General in 1880. McLeary was appointed an Associate Justice of the Supreme Court of the Montana Territory by President Grover Cleveland in 1886. McLeary served in the Spanish–American War in 1898, reaching the rank of Major. In December 1901, President Theodore Roosevelt appointed him as Associate Justice of the Supreme Court of Puerto Rico.

== Personal life and death ==
McLeary married Emily Mitchell in December 1869 and they had one child who survived to adulthood. After his wife died in 1872, he married Mary King in August 1875. They had four children together.

In November 1913, McLeary returned to the mainland U.S. from Puerto Rico because of poor health. He died in Washington D.C. January 5, 1914 at age 68.

Political offices
Preceded by John Coburn	Justice of the Montana Supreme Court; 1886–1888	Succeeded by Court abolished
Preceded by George McCormick	Texas Attorney General; 1880–1882	Succeeded by John D. Templeton
