= Thomas Slater Smith =

American jurist and lawmaker from Texas

Thomas S. Smith
- Preceded by: John Hughes Cochran
- Succeeded by: L. Travis Dashiell

Personal details
- Born: Thomas Slater Smith; July 6, 1856 Mississippi, U.S.
- Died: March 15, 1901 (aged 44) Austin, Texas, U.S.

Thomas Slater Smith (1856–1901) was an American jurist from Texas. He was a member of the Texas Legislature where he served as the Speaker of the Texas House of Representatives. He was later elected as the Texas Attorney General.

== Early life and education ==
Slater was born on July 6, 1856 in Mississippi. He attended Emory & Henry College, graduating in 1877. He obtained his law degree from the University of Virginia in 1878.

== Career ==
Slater began practicing law in Mississippi and served two terms as mayor of Tupelo, Mississippi. He moved to Hillsboro, Texas in 1884 and became the attorney for Hill County, Texas, and was also named to the Democratic committee for the state of Texas for the 21st Senatorial District beginning in 1888. In 1893, Slater was elected to the Texas Legislature, serving as the Speaker of the Texas House of Representatives before resigning office to serve as elector for the 1896 United States presidential election.

Slater was elected Texas Attorney General and took office in 1898.While Attorney General, he won two cases before the United States Supreme Court.

== Personal life ==
Smith died while in office on March 15, 1901.
