= Hannibal Boone =

American Attorney General

Hannibal Honestus Boone

16th Attorney General of Texas
- In office April 25, 1876 – November 5, 1878
- Governor: Richard Coke; Richard B. Hubbard
- Preceded by: George W. Clark
- Succeeded by: George McCormick

Personal details
- Born: 24 February 1834 Tipton County, Tennessee, US
- Died: 23 May 1897 (aged 63) Navasota, Texas, US
- Party: Democratic
- Profession: Lawyer, Politician

Military service
- Allegiance: Confederate States
- Branch/service: Confederate Army
- Years of service: 1861–1865
- Rank: Major
- Unit: Waller's Regiment, Texas Cavalry
- Battles/wars: American Civil War

Hannibal Honestus Boone (February 24, 1834 – May 23, 1897) was the 16th attorney general of Texas.

== Biography ==
He was the son of Joseph and Harriet Boone, was born in Tipton County, Tennessee. The Boone family was in Austin (now Waller) County, Texas by 1852. Boone studied law at Austin College, but never graduated. In June 1953, a charter of the Phi Delta Theta fraternity was granted to Boone and 2 other students. He managed his father's plantation until 1859, when he began to practice law in Hempstead. In 1861, Boone married Rebecca Fullinwieder, with whom he had one daughter.

With the outbreak of the Civil War in 1861, Boone enlisted as a private in Colonel John S. Ford's regiment of the Confederate Army. The regiment chiefly protected trade between the Confederacy and Mexico by patrolling the Rio Grande. Boone later rose to the rank of Major and served as executive officer to Major Edwin Waller Jr, on the Texas-Louisiana border. Boone was wounded on September 29, 1863, at Fordoche, Louisiana, losing his right arm and the first two fingers and thumb of his left hand. He was transferred to the headquarters for the Texas District and served under General John B. Magruder for the rest of the war.

Toward the end of the war, in November 1863, Boone married Susan Gordon, with whom he had many children. After the war ended, the two moved to Anderson, Texas, where Boone practiced law. Boone was elected Attorney General of Texas in 1876 and served one term. Former attorney general William M. Walton had planned to run in the 1876 election but withdrew from the race when he learned Boone, a disabled Confederate veteran, was a candidate. Boone move to Navasota after his term in Austin where he lived until his death on May 23, 1897.

Legal offices
Preceded by George W. Clark	Attorney General of Tennessee; 1876–1878	Succeeded by George McCormick
