= John L. Gronski =

US Army major general

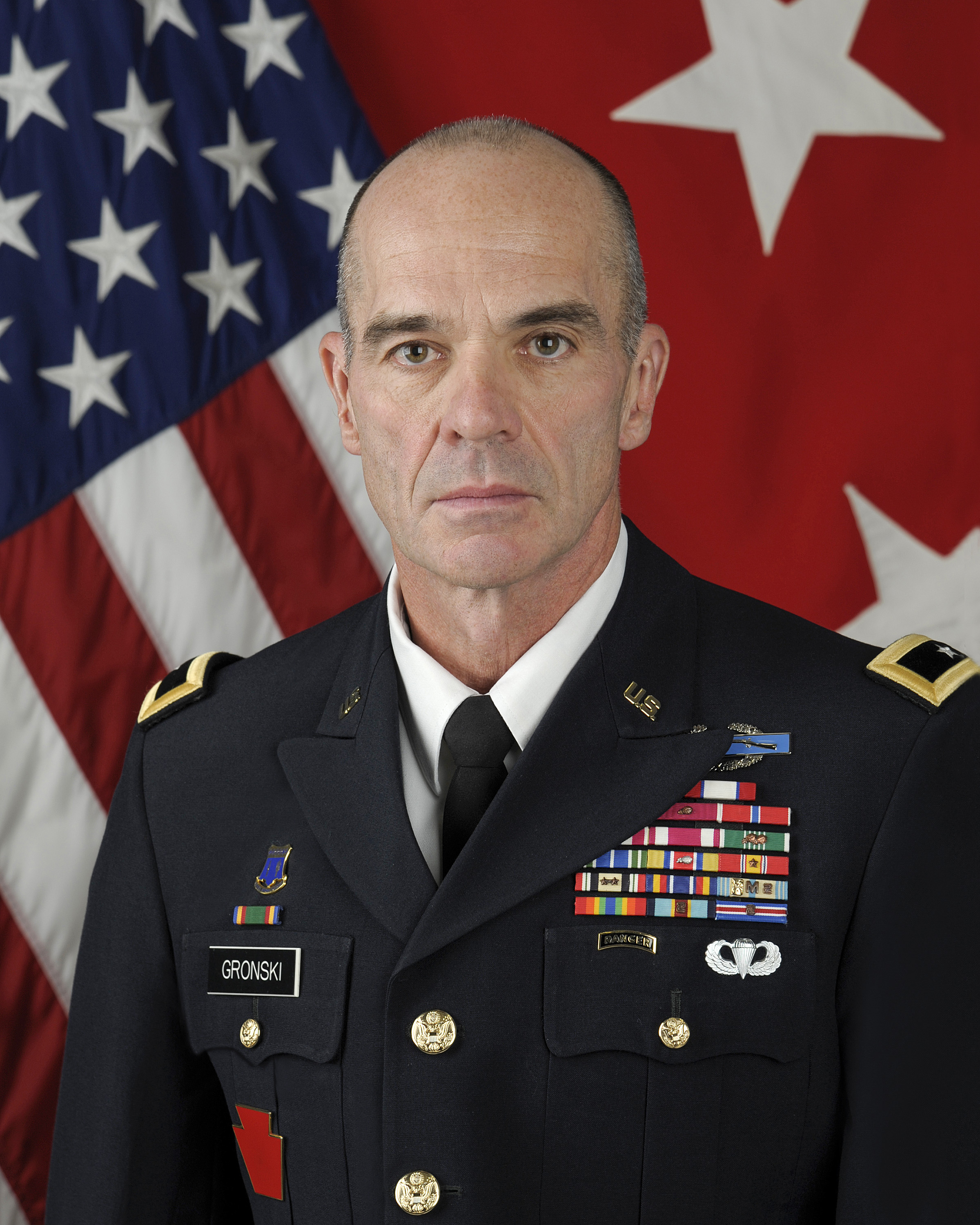
- Gronski as a brigadier general, circa 2012
- Born: 1956 (age 69–70); Scranton, Pennsylvania, US
- Alma mater: University of Scranton; Pennsylvania State University; United States Army Command and General Staff College; United States Army War College
- Spouse: Berti Kasbauer
- Children: 2
- Military career
- Service: United States Army; United States Army Reserve; Pennsylvania Army National Guard
- Service years: 1978–2019
- Rank: Major General
- Unit: US Army Infantry Branch
- Commands: 28th Infantry Division; 2nd Infantry Brigade Combat Team; 55th Infantry Brigade; 1st Battalion, 109th Infantry Regiment; Company A, 2nd Battalion, 109th Infantry Regiment
- Wars: Iraq War
- Awards: Army Distinguished Service Medal (2); Legion of Merit (2); Bronze Star Medal; Defense Meritorious Service Medal; Meritorious Service Medal; Army Commendation Medal (3); Army Achievement Medal
- Other work: Author; Corporate trainer

John L. Gronski (b. 1956) is a retired United States Army officer. A veteran of the Iraq War, he served from 1978 to 2019 and attained the rank of major general. His decorations included two awards of the Army Distinguished Service Medal, two awards of the Legion of Merit, and the Bronze Star Medal.

A native of Scranton, Pennsylvania, Gronski was raised and educated in nearby Moosic, and graduated from Riverside Junior/High School in Taylor in 1974. He then attended the University of Scranton, from which he graduated in 1978. While in college, he also completed the school's Army Reserve Officers' Training Corps program and received his commission as a second lieutenant. After initial service at Fort Benning, Georgia and Fort Lewis, Washington, he returned to Pennsylvania. Gronski worked as a manager and executive for his family's automobile sales and service business and worked as a corporate consultant.

Gronski continued his military service with the Pennsylvania Army National Guard and became qualified in the Infantry Branch; in addition to the Infantry Officer Advanced Course, he completed the Airborne course, Ranger School, the United States Army Command and General Staff College and United States Army War College. In addition, he completed a Master of Business Administration degree at Pennsylvania State University.

As he advanced through the ranks, Gronski's command assignments included: Company A, 2nd Battalion, 109th Infantry Regiment; 1st Battalion, 109th Infantry Regiment; 55th Infantry Brigade; 2nd Infantry Brigade Combat Team; and the 28th Infantry Division. He led 2nd Brigade in Ramadi during the Iraq War. After completing his command of the 28th Infantry Division in 2016, Gronski served as deputy commander of United States Army Europe until retiring in 2019.

After retiring from the military, Gronski authored three books. In addition, he operated a consulting business that provided leadership advice and training to clients from business and government.

== Early life ==
John L. Gronski was born in Scranton, Pennsylvania in 1956, a son of Paul X. Gronski and Laura Ruth (O'Hara) Gronski. He was raised and educated in Moosic, and is a 1974 graduate of Riverside Junior/High School in Taylor. Gronski attended the University of Scranton, from which he graduated in 1978 with a Bachelor of Science degree in human services. While in college, Gronski took part in the Army Reserve Officers' Training Corps, and was editor of the university's ROTC newspaper. After completing the ROTC program, Gronski received his commission as a second lieutenant in the Medical Service Corps (MSC).

== Start of career ==
After receiving his commission, Gronski completed his initial MSC officer training at Fort Sam Houston, Texas, and also completed the Airborne course at Fort Benning, Georgia. His initial assignments included United States Army Reserve postings as field medical assistant with the 34th Medical Battalion at Fort Benning and the 6250th Army Hospital at Fort Lewis, Washington. He was promoted to first lieutenant in 1980 and captain in 1982. While living in Georgia, Gronski was a program manager for Fort Benning's Army Community Service office. While living in Washington, he worked as a counselor at a Tacoma drug and alcohol abuse rehabilitation center and as a ranger at Mount Rainier National Park.

== Continued career ==
Gronski returned to Pennsylvania in 1983, where he was a manager and executive for the family business, Paul Gronski Enterprises, an auto sales and service enterprise for which he also worked while he was in college. In addition to continuing his career with Gronski Enterprises, he also began a career as a corporate consultant with Greencastle Associates of Malvern. In addition, he transferred his military membership to the National Guard and completed the Infantry Officer Advanced Course. His initial assignments in Pennsylvania included maintenance officer for 2nd Battalion, 109th Infantry Regiment in Scranton (August 1984 to March 1986) and commander of Company A, 2nd Battalion, 109th Infantry in West Pittston.

In February 1990, Gronski was assigned as intelligence staff officer (S2) on the staff of 2nd Battalion, 109th Infantry in Scranton. In July 1990, he was appointed executive officer of 3rd Battalion, 109th Infantry Regiment in Milton, and he was promoted to major in November 1990. In 1990, Gronski also graduated from Ranger School. From September 1993 to September 1994, he was plans, operations, and training officer (S-3) for 2nd Battalion, 109th Infantry. Gronski continued his military education with completion of the United States Army Command and General Staff College course, and in September 1994 he was assigned to command 1st Battalion, 109th Infantry in Scranton. In February 1995, Gronski received promotion to lieutenant colonel.

From February to April 1999, Gronski was assigned as assistant chief of staff at the 28th Infantry Division headquarters in Harrisburg. From April 1999 to January 2000, he was a deputy division chief on the staff of Pennsylvania's State Area Command headquarters at Fort Indiantown Gap, and he was promoted to colonel in October 1999. From January 2000 to June 2001, he served as an additional staff officer of the State Area Command, and performed duty in Lithuania, one of the Pennsylvania National Guard's Partnership for Peace partners. In addition, he also completed the United States Army War College and received his Master of Strategic Studies degree. In July 2001, he was appointed to command the 55th Infantry Brigade in Scranton. In 2003, he completed his Master of Business Administration degree at Pennsylvania State University.

== Later career ==
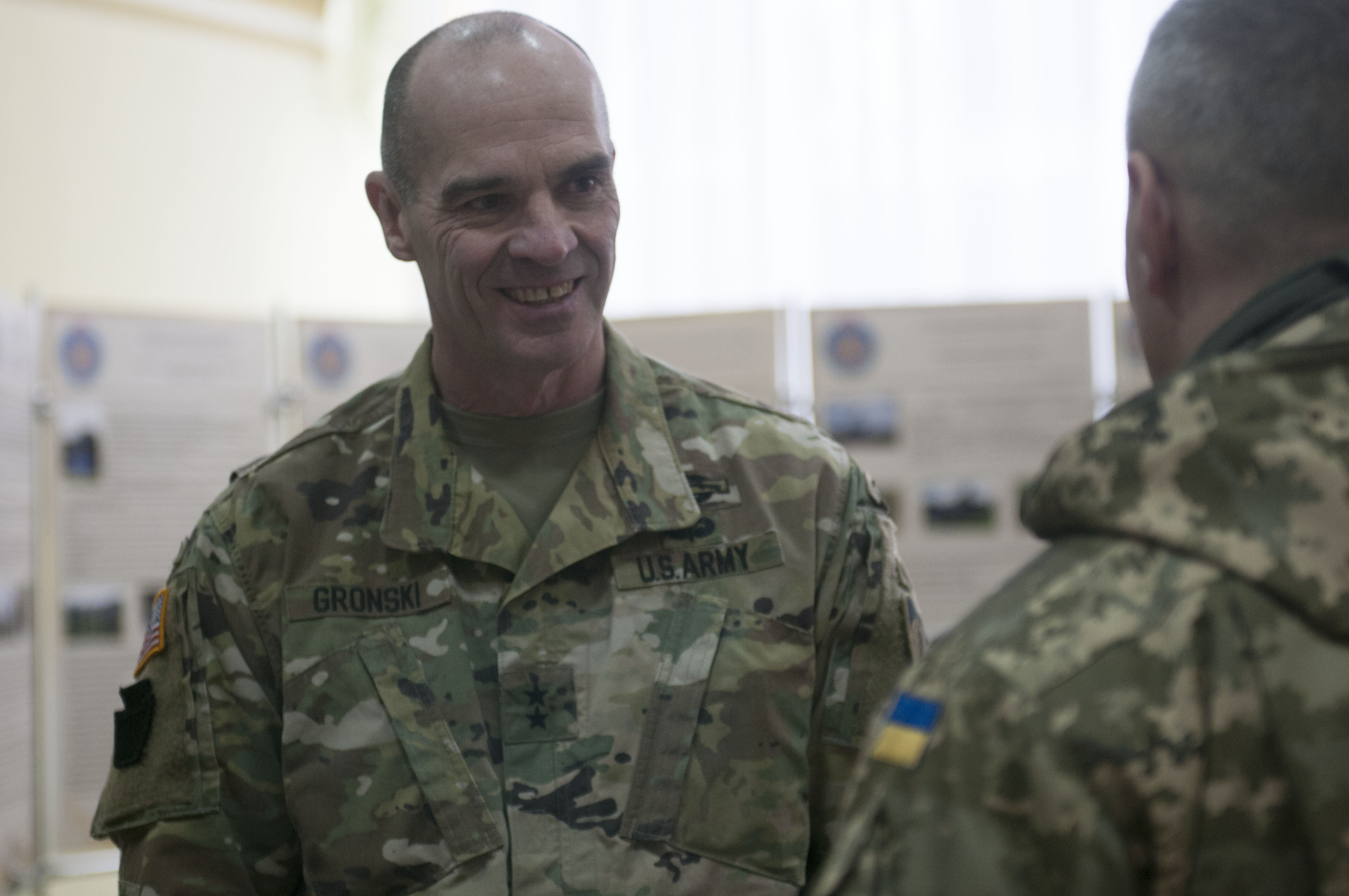
Gronski visiting Oklahoma National Guard soldiers in Ukraine, 2017

From September 2004 to January 2005, Gronski served as Pennsylvania's assistant adjutant general for army. In January 2005, he was assigned to command the 2nd Infantry Brigade Combat Team, which was posted to Ramadi during the Iraq War. Upon returning to Pennsylvania in August 2006, he was again assigned as the state's assistant adjutant general for army. Gronski was promoted to brigadier general in January 2007.

Professional education Gronski completed while in the senior ranks included the: Brigadier General Training Conference (BGTC); National Security Leadership Course (NSLC) at Syracuse University; Joint Task Force Commanders Course at United States Northern Command (NORTHCOM); Enabling Battle Command Workshop; Reserve Component - General Officer Legal Orientation Course (RC-GOLO); Dual Status Commanders Course at NORTHCOM; Assistant Division Commanders Course; Army Strategic Education Program - Advanced (ASEP-A); and Senior Executives in National and International Security (SENIS) at Harvard University.

From September 2012 to May 2016, Gronski was commander of the 28th Infantry Division, and he received promotion to major general in July 2014. From May 2016 until March 2019, he was deputy commander of United States Army Europe at Lucius D. Clay Kaserne, Germany. Gronski retired from the military in June 2019.

After retiring from the military, Gronski authored three books, Iron-Sharpened Leadership, The Ride of Our Lives, and Leadership Sharpeners. He also operated Leader Grove Consulting, LLC, which provides leadership advice, assessment, training, and coaching to corporate and government clients.

== Awards ==
Gronski's awards and decorations included:

=== Federal awards ===
- Army Distinguished Service Medal with 1 bronze oak leaf cluster
- Legion of Merit with 1 bronze oak leaf cluster
- Bronze Star Medal
- Defense Meritorious Service Medal
- Meritorious Service Medal
- Army Commendation Medal with 2 bronze oak leaf clusters
- Army Achievement Medal
- Navy Unit Commendation with 1 bronze star
- Army Reserve Components Achievement Medal with 1 silver oak leaf cluster
- National Defense Service Medal with 1 bronze service star
- Iraq Campaign Medal with 2 bronze service stars
- Global War on Terrorism Service Medal
- Armed Forces Reserve Medal with gold hourglass, 'M' device and numeral 2
- Army Service Ribbon
- Overseas Service Ribbon with numeral 2
- Army Reserve Components Overseas Training Ribbon with numeral 2
- Combat Infantryman Badge
- Parachutist Badge
- Ranger Tab

=== State awards ===
- Pennsylvania Meritorious Service Medal
- Pennsylvania Twenty Year Service Medal (with 2 Silver Stars)
- Major General Thomas R. White Jr. Medal
- Pennsylvania Recruiting and Retention Medal
- General Thomas J. Stewart Medal
- Governor's Unit Citation
- The Adjutant General Staff Identification Badge

=== Civilian awards ===
- University of Scranton Frank J. O'Hara Award for Government Service
- National Infantry Association Honorable Order of Saint Maurice (Primicerius)
- Boy Scouts of America Silver Beaver Award
- Pennsylvania Veterans of Foreign Wars Eagle Award
- Washington Crossing Foundation Award for service and dedication to the ideals of the Founding Fathers
- Knights of Columbus Patriotic Service Award
- National Society of the Sons of the American Revolution Outstanding Citizenship Award

=== Foreign decorations ===
- Medal of the Order for Merits to Lithuania (For meritorious service while serving in Lithuania from January 2000 to January 2001.)

== Effective dates of promotion ==
Gronski's effective dates of rank were:

- Major General, July 23, 2014
- Brigadier General, January 18, 2007
- Colonel, October 1, 1999
- Lieutenant Colonel, February 17, 1995
- Major, November 20, 1990
- Captain, August 1, 1982
- First Lieutenant, October 9, 1980
- Second Lieutenant, May 28, 1978
