= James Earl Rudder =

United States Army general

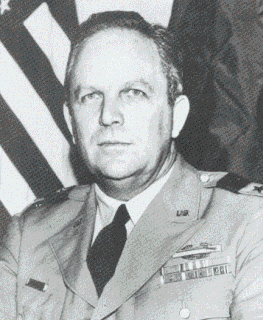
- Born: May 6, 1910; Eden, Texas, U.S.
- Died: March 23, 1970 (aged 59); Houston, Texas, U.S.
- Alma mater: A&M College of Texas
- Military career
- Allegiance: United States
- Branch: United States Army
- Service years: 1932–1967
- Rank: Major General
- Service number: 0-294916
- Unit: Infantry Branch
- Commands: 90th Infantry Division; 109th Infantry Regiment; Provisional Ranger Group; 2nd Ranger Battalion
- Conflicts: World War II: D-Day Ranger assault at Pointe du hoc; Battle of Hürtgenwald; Battle of the Bulge; Cold War
- Awards: Distinguished Service Cross; Distinguished Service Medal; Silver Star; Legion of Merit; Bronze Star Medal (2)

21st Texas Land Commissioner
- In office 1955–1958
- Preceded by: Bascom Giles
- Succeeded by: Bill Allcorn

16th President of Texas A&M University
- In office July 1, 1959 – March 23, 1970
- Preceded by: Marion Thomas Harrington
- Succeeded by: Alvin Roubal Luedecke (Acting)

James Earl Rudder (May 6, 1910 – March 23, 1970) was a United States Army major general. As a lieutenant colonel, he commanded the Pointe du Hoc battle during the Invasion of Normandy. He also commanded the 2nd Ranger Battalion at the Battle of the Hürtgen Forest, and led a series of delaying actions and ambushes during the Battle of the Bulge. General Rudder also at various times served as Texas Land Commissioner, the 16th president of Texas A&M University, third president of the Texas A&M University System, mayor of Brady, Texas, and a high school and college teacher and coach. Rudder went by his middle name.

== Early life ==
James Earl Rudder was born on May 6, 1910, in Eden, Texas, the fifth son to survive to adulthood of Dee Forest and Annie Rudder (nee Powell). Rudder attended Eden High School, where he was a member of the first football team at the school, graduating in 1927. After graduating from high school, Rudder clerked at the local drug store, where the football coach for John Tarleton Agricultural College found him. Rudder enrolled at Tarleton, with a declared major of civil engineering in the fall semester of 1927. After spending three years at Tarleton, Rudder transferred to the Agricultural and Mechanical College of Texas.

== Military career ==
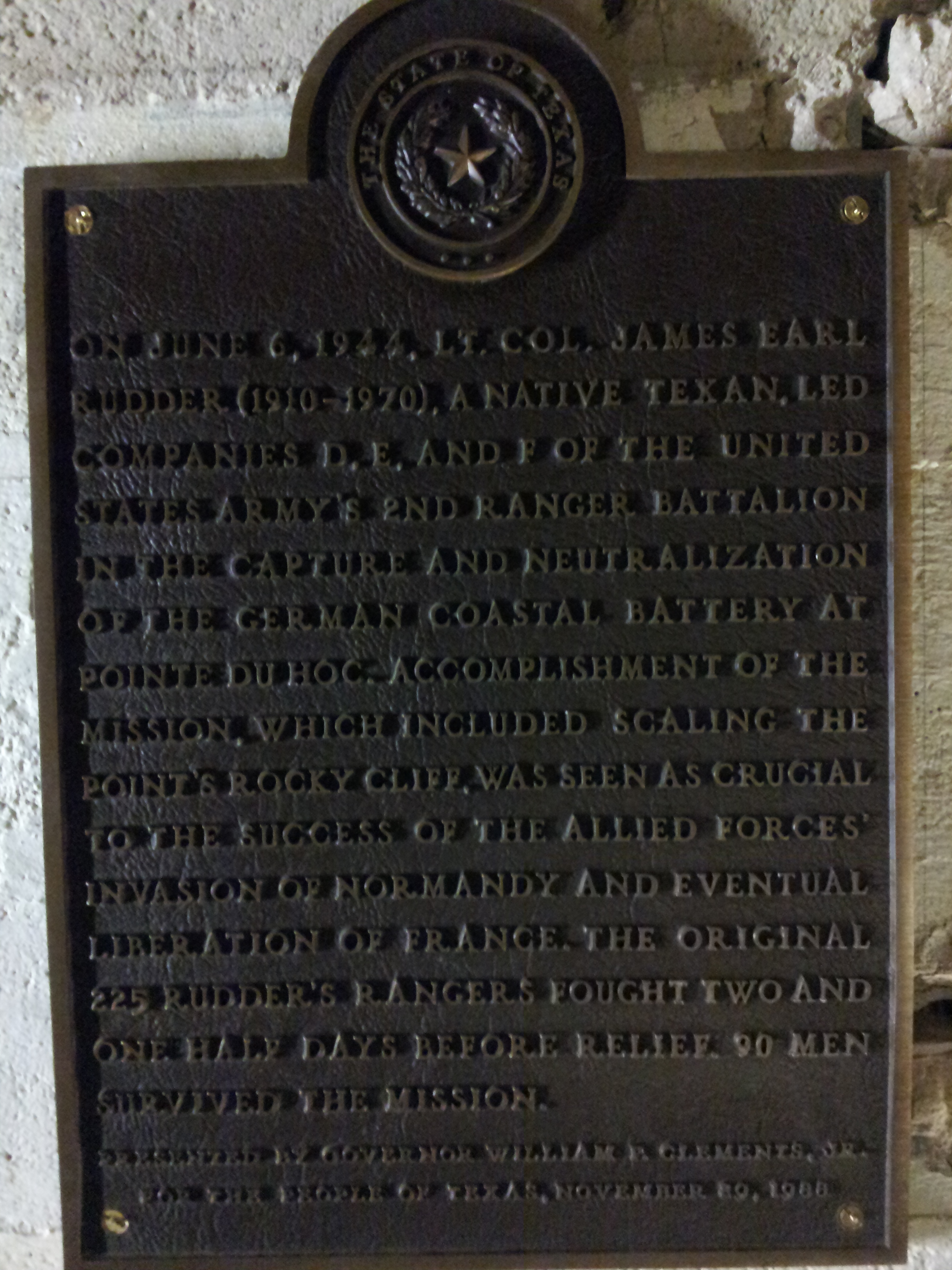
Texas historical marker in the German observation bunker at Pointe du Hoc

After attending John Tarleton Agricultural College and then graduating from Texas A&M in 1932 with a degree in industrial education, Rudder had been commissioned a second lieutenant of infantry in the United States Organized Reserve Corps. After being called into active duty in 1941, Rudder took part in the D-Day landings as commanding officer of the United States Army's 2nd Ranger Battalion.

His U.S. Army Rangers stormed the beach at Pointe du Hoc, scaling 100-ft (30-m) cliffs under enemy fire to reach and destroy a German gun battery. The battalion's casualty rate for this perilous mission was greater than 50%. Rudder himself was wounded twice during the course of the fighting. By the time of preparations for D-Day, the Wehrmacht-run battery at the top of the Pointe was marked on the Allied D-Day maps as a Rangers D-Day target - confirmed in records found in the early 21st century.[1] By the time of the invasion, Pointe du Hoc's artillery pieces had been moved to another nearby site, replaced by telephone poles. By 0900 hours on D-Day, a two-man patrol from the Rangers located the Pointe's missing guns. Sergeant Lomell and Staff Sgt. Jack E. Kuhn, using thermite grenades, disabled two of the five artillery pieces and destroyed the sighting mechanism of another. While retrieving more grenades to finish the job, a second patrol, led by Staff Sgt. Frank A. Rupinski, also located the artillery pieces, and disabled the remainder using thermite grenades. They started a fire in the powder charges and left the area, accomplishing the goal of destroying the artillery pieces that had been targeted at Utah Beach, but were also in range of Omaha Beach. Rudder ordered his men to dig in, and they fought off German counterattacks for two days until relieved. He and his men helped successfully establish a beachhead for the Allied forces. The siege was replicated in the 1962 epic film The Longest Day.

Seven months later, Rudder was reassigned to the 109th Infantry Regiment, which saw key service in the Battle of the Bulge. Rudder earned military honors, including the Distinguished Service Cross, Bronze Star with Oak Leaf Cluster, Purple Heart with Oak Leaf Cluster, French Legion of Honor with Croix de Guerre and Palm, and Order of Leopold (Belgium) with Croix de Guerre and Palm. He was a full colonel by the war's end, and was promoted to brigadier general of the United States Army Reserve in 1954 and major general in 1957.

== Political and academic career ==
Rudder's statue on the Texas A&M University campus in College Station, Texas

After returning home from the war, Rudder was asked to run for mayor of his hometown of Brady, Texas. He did not campaign, yet defeated the incumbent. He served as mayor of Brady for six years, from 1946 to 1952, then chose to move on. In 1953, he became vice president of Brady Aviation Company. On January 1, 1955, he assumed the office of Texas Land Commissioner after Bascom Giles was convicted and sent to prison for defrauding veterans. At that time, the Veterans Land Board was under scrutiny for mismanagement and corruption. Rudder undertook the task of reforming policies, expediting land applications, and closely supervising proper accounting procedures. He also oversaw the proper leasing of state lands by employing more field inspectors for oil and gas sites and adding a seismic exploration staff. In addition, he improved working conditions for his staff and instigated a program to preserve the many deteriorating General Land Office documents.

Rudder won the 1956 state land commissioner election as a Democrat. He became vice president of Texas A&M University in 1958 and was named its president in 1959. He was president of the entire A&M System from 1965 until his death in 1970. In 1967, President Lyndon B. Johnson presented him with the Army Distinguished Service Medal, the Army's highest peacetime service award. Rudder and his wife Margaret were Johnson's White House guests on multiple occasions.

Since his death in 1970, an annual service has been held in Normandy, France, in Rudder's honor.

While president of Texas A&M, Rudder is credited for transforming it from a small, all-male land-grant college to the university of today. Specifically, he made membership in the Corps of Cadets optional, allowed women to attend, and led efforts to integrate the campus. While the changes were hugely unpopular to the former students (it has been said only a president with Rudder's heroic military record could pull off such drastic changes), these changes freed Texas A&M to become the largest university in the United States by enrollment. Many reminders of Rudder are on campus, including Rudder Tower, next to the Memorial Student Center. A special training unit within the Corps of Cadets, known as "Rudder's Rangers", is named in his honor. Cadets within the Corps of Cadets at A&M are expected to be able to recite an excerpt from the inscription on Rudder Tower, a "Campusology" that reads:

In memory of James Earl Rudder, 1910–1970, Class of 1932, Heroic Soldier, Commissioner of the General Land Office of Texas, Sixteenth President of Texas A&M University ... Third President of the Texas A&M University System. Earl Rudder was architect of the dream that produced this center. In this, as in all he did, he demonstrated uncommon ability to inspire men and lead them to exceptional achievement.

== Personal life ==
Rudder married his wife, Margaret (Williamson), in 1937. They had five children. Margaret died in 2004.

He was a Freemason, and a member of Parsons Lodge No. 222 in downtown Austin, Texas.

== Death ==
Rudder died on March 23, 1970, after suffering a cerebral hemorrhage.

Rudder was posthumously selected as an inaugural member of the U.S. Army Ranger Hall of Fame in 1992.

== Tributes ==
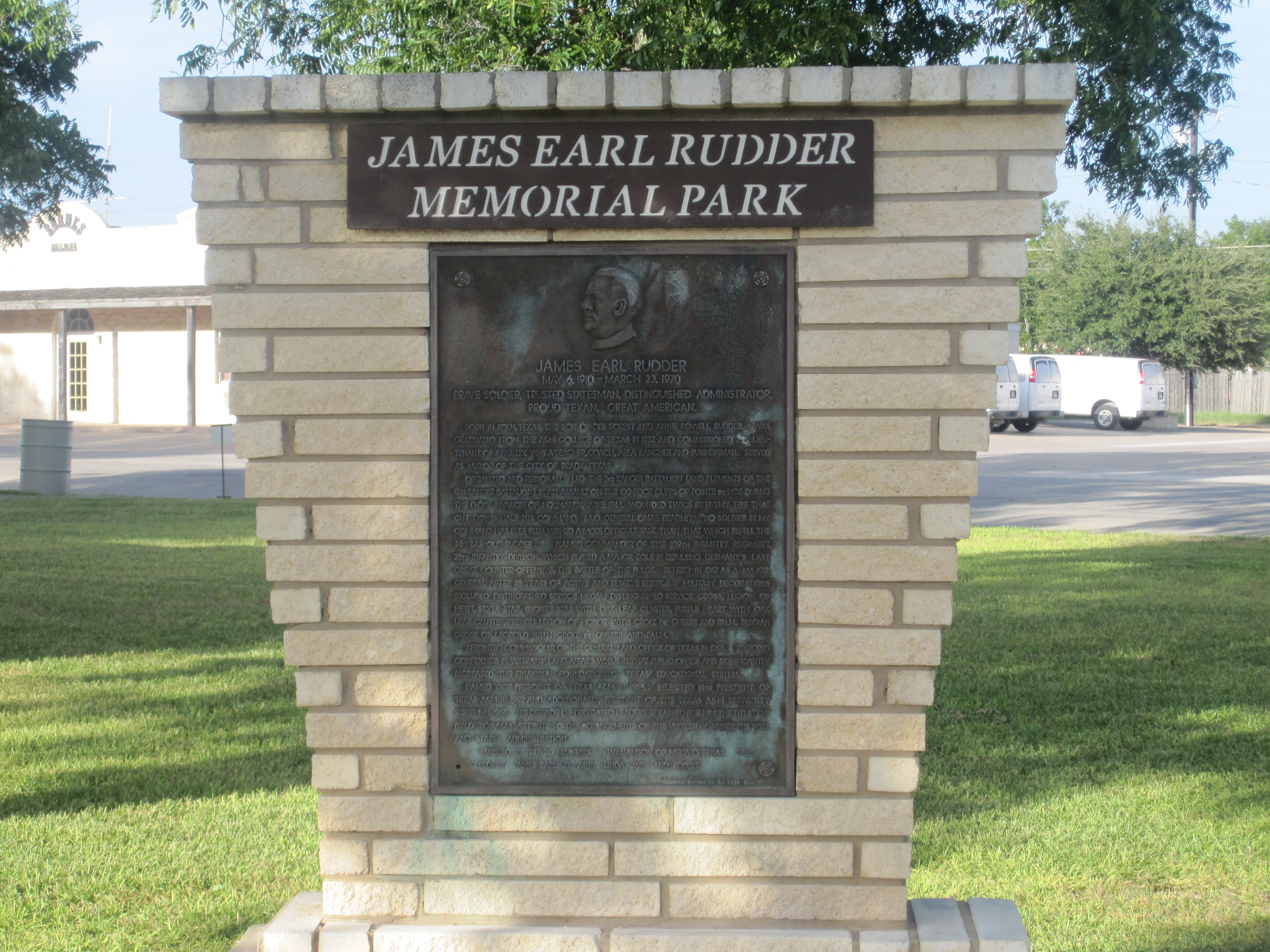
James Earl Rudder Memorial Park in Eden, Texas

- Earl Rudder Freeway — the portion of U.S. Highway 190/State Highway 6 that runs through Bryan and College Station, Texas
- Earl Rudder Middle School — in San Antonio, Texas
- James Earl Rudder High School — the second high school of the Bryan Independent School District opened in Bryan in August 2008; appropriately, the athletic teams are known as the Rangers
- James E. Rudder State Office Building — main public office of the Texas Secretary of State, 1019 Brazos St., Austin, Texas 78701
- J. Earl Rudder Tower and Theatre Complex — a 12-story building with a theatre and auditorium attached on the campus of Texas A&M University in College Station, Texas
- TS General Rudder — training ship for the Texas A&M "Texas Maritime Academy" at Galveston (2012)
- Camp James E. Rudder, subpost of Eglin Air Force Base, Florida, training site for the Florida phase of U.S. Army Ranger School
- Rudder Way, a walking path on the campus of Tarleton State University in Stephenville, Texas
- Major General James E. Rudder Medal, annual award by the Association of the United States Army (AUSA) to an Army Reserve Soldier - serving or retired - whose career in the Army Reserve exemplifies the Army Reserve Citizen-Soldier modeled by General Rudder

Party political offices
Preceded by Bascom Giles	Democratic nominee for Land Commissioner of Texas; 1956	Succeeded by Bill Allcorn
Political offices
Preceded by Bascom Giles	Texas Land Commissioner; 1955–1958	Succeeded by Bill Allcorn
