= General Land Office =

General Land Office may refer to:

== Government ==
- Texas General Land Office, state agency (1836–Present)
- United States General Land Office, federal agency (1812–1946)

== See also ==
- Category:Land offices, individual land office buildings
