= Laurence H. Watres =

American politician (1882–1964)

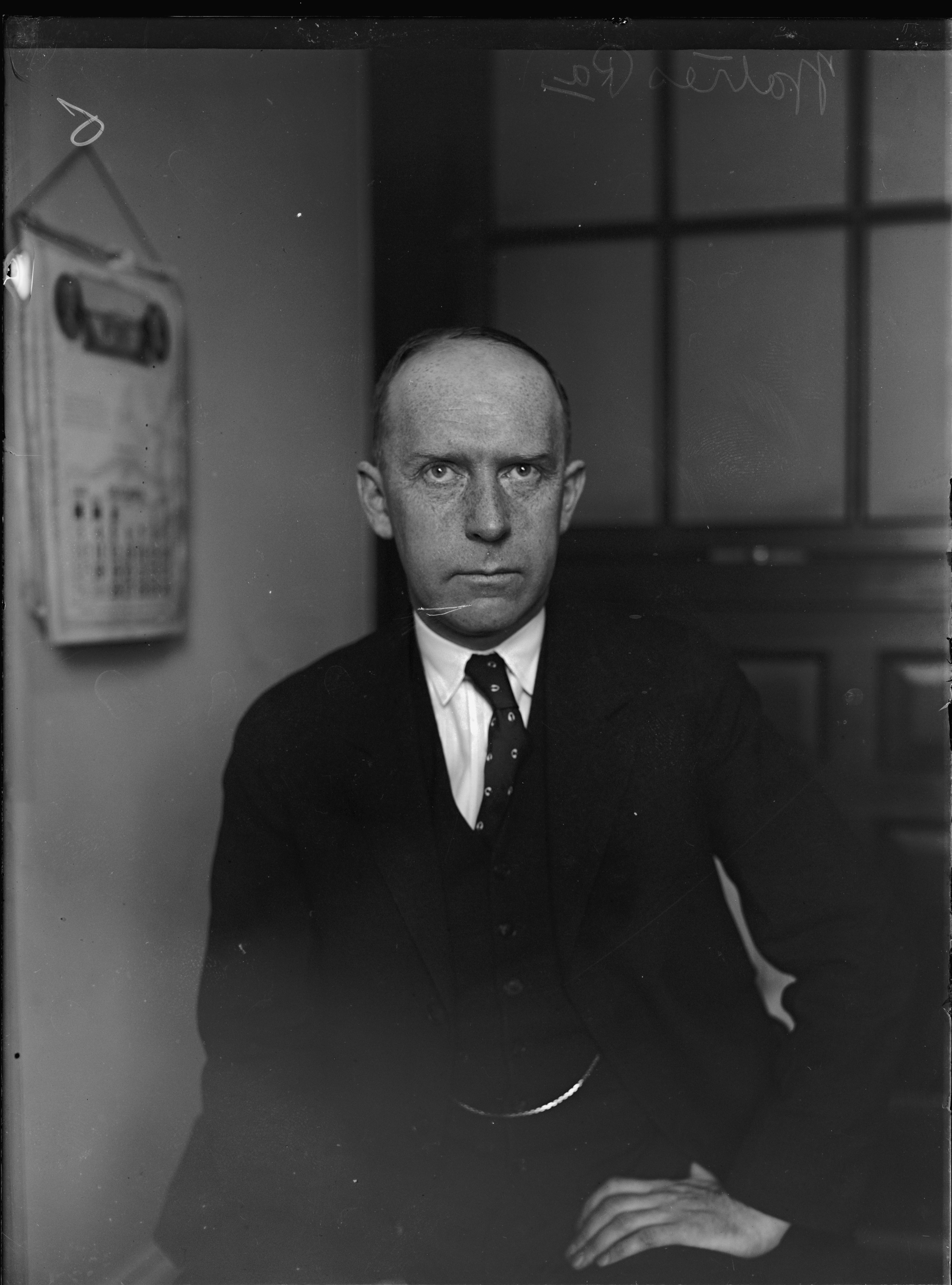
- National Photo Company Collection, Library of Congress

Member of the United States House of Representatives from Pennsylvania's 11th congressional district
- In office March 4, 1923 – March 3, 1931
- Preceded by: Clarence D. Coughlin
- Succeeded by: Patrick J. Boland

Personal details
- Born: July 18, 1882 Scranton, Pennsylvania, U.S.
- Died: February 6, 1964 (aged 81) San Germán, Puerto Rico
- Resting place: Glenwood Mausoleum, Clarks Summit, Pennsylvania, U.S.
- Party: Republican
- Relatives: Louis Arthur Watres (father)
- Education: Princeton University; Harvard Law School
- Profession: Attorney; Newspaper publisher
- Military career
- Allegiance: United States; Pennsylvania
- Branch: United States Army; Pennsylvania Army National Guard
- Service years: 1899; 1907–1928
- Rank: Lieutenant Colonel
- Service number: O-178825
- Unit: U.S. Army Infantry Branch
- Commands: Company C, 13th Pennsylvania Infantry Regiment; Company M, 109th Infantry Regiment, 28th Division; Company B, 108th Machine Gun Battalion, 28th Division; Company D, 109th Infantry Regiment, 28th Division; 101st Machine Gun Battalion, 26th Division; 109th Machine Gun Battalion, 28th Division
- Wars: Pancho Villa Expedition; World War I
- Awards: Distinguished Service Cross; Purple Heart

Laurence Hawley Watres (July 18, 1882 – February 6, 1964) was an attorney and politician from Scranton, Pennsylvania. A Republican, he was most notable for his service as a member of the U.S. House of Representatives from 1923 to 1931.

A native of Scranton, and the son of a prominent Pennsylvania political and business figure, Watres graduated from Princeton University and Harvard Law School before practicing law in Scranton. In addition, he was involved in several businesses, as well as charitable and civic endeavors. A longtime member of the National Guard, Watres was a veteran of the Pancho Villa Expedition and World War I, earning the Distinguished Service Cross for wartime heroism during combat in France.

In 1922, Watres was elected to the U.S. House. He was reelected three times, and served from 1923 to 1931. During his Congressional service, Watres largely concentrated on veterans' issues and the regulation of the growing air mail and commercial aviation fields. He was not a candidate for reelection in 1930, and resumed practicing law in Scranton. In addition, he became the publisher of the Scranton Republican newspaper.

In 1951, Watres moved to East Orange, New Jersey, where he lived in retirement. He died on February 6, 1964, while on vacation in San Germán, Puerto Rico. He was buried at Glenwood Mausoleum in Clarks Summit, Pennsylvania.

== Early life ==
Laurence H. Watres was born in Scranton, Pennsylvania on July 18, 1882, the son of Louis Arthur Watres and Effie J. (Hawley) Watres. He attended the public schools of Scranton and The Hill School, before enrolling at Princeton University, where he graduated with an AB degree in 1904.

After college, Watres attended Harvard Law School and received his LL.B. degree in 1907. He was admitted to the bar later that year and commenced practice in Scranton. Watres was a lifelong bachelor; he never married, and had no children.

== Military career ==
=== Early career ===
In March 1899, Watres joined the Pennsylvania National Guard's Company K, 11th Infantry Regiment as a private, and he served until his discharge in November 1899. In October 1907 he joined Company H, 13th Infantry Regiment as a private, and he advanced to corporal and sergeant before receiving his commission as a second lieutenant in July 1908. Watres was promoted to first lieutenant in September 1909, captain in March 1916, major in October 1918, and lieutenant colonel in April 1921.

As a captain, Watres commanded Company C, 13th Infantry Regiment during its service on the Mexico–United States border as part of the Pancho Villa Expedition.

=== World War I ===
At the start of World War I, Watres commanded Company M, 109th Infantry Regiment, a unit of the 28th Division. He was subsequently assigned to command the division's Company B, 108th Machine Gun Battalion.

Watres took part in numerous battles, and was wounded at the Battle of Fismes and Fismette in September 1918. During action near Baslieux-lès-Fismes, Watres took the initiative to assume command of Company D, 109th Infantry, which had lost all its officers and was falling into disorganization. He combined the company with soldiers from his own company and led an ad hoc attack that resulted in numerous enemy killed, wounded, and taken prisoner, as well as the capture of several machine gun nests.

Watres was hospitalized while he recovered from his wounds, after which he was assigned to command the 101st Machine Gun Battalion, a unit of the 26th Division. He later took command of the 109th Machine Gun Battalion, which he led until it was demobilized in May 1919, following the end of the war. For his wartime service, Watres was a recipient of the Distinguished Service Cross and Purple Heart.

=== Post-war ===
After returning to the United States world war I, Watres took part in reorganizing the 109th Infantry Regiment. He was appointed its second-in-command with the rank of lieutenant colonel, and continued to serve until retiring in 1928. In 1926, a delegation from the Polish Army Veterans Association presented Watres with Haller's Swords, a decoration named for General Józef Haller, recognising his contributions to the cause of Polish independence during World War I.

=== Distinguished Service Cross citation ===
The President of the United States of America, authorized by Act of Congress, July 9, 1918, takes pleasure in presenting the Distinguished Service Cross to Captain (Infantry) Laurence H. Watres, United States Army, for extraordinary heroism in action while serving with 108th Machine-Gun Battalion, 28th Division, A.E.F., near Baslieux, France, 5 September 1918. Under heavy enemy machine-gun fire, Captain Watres took command of Company D, 109th Infantry, which was without officers and was greatly disorganized in a position to his rear. He led the company, together with some of his own men to the attack, killing a number of the enemy, taking others prisoners, and capturing several machine gun nests.

GENERAL ORDERS: War Department, General Orders No. 130 (1919)

== Continued career ==
After his wartime service, Cronin returned to Scranton, where he assumed management of the Scranton Republican newspaper, which was owned by his family. He continued to operate the newspaper until selling it in 1934. In addition to his work in publishing, Watres was also involved in other businesses, including serving as a director of Scranton's First National Bank and the Scranton Trust Company. For many years he was corporate counsel and a member of the board of directors of the Scranton's Spring Brook Water Company, another Watres family venture. Watres was also a longtime director of the Wesel Manufacturing Company, producers of wood and metalworking machinery.

Watres was involved in numerous charitable and civic endeavors, including service as executive officer of the Order of DeMolay in Pennsylvania from 1939 to 1951. He also served as Grand Master of DeMolay's International Supreme Council from 1947 to 1948. In addition, he served as a trustee and president of the Community Welfare Association of Scranton and Dunmore, which later became the Lackawanna United Fund. He also served as president of Scranton's Community Chest. Watres was also a leader of the Scranton area Rotary Club, and served as its vice president.

Watres succeeded his father, Louis A. Watres, who was a longtime trustee of Keystone Military Academy, and was one of the leaders who transformed the school into Keystone Junior College (now Keystone College) in the 1930s. He remained on the board until 1962, when he was designated a trustee emeritus. He also served on the board of trustees of the Knox School, a private boarding and day school for girls that was then located in Cooperstown, New York, and later moved to Saint James, New York.

Active in youth and patriotic organizations, Watres was long involved with the Boy Scouts of America (BSA) and served as president of the Scranton-area council. In 1952, he was a recipient of the BSA's Silver Beaver Award. As a descendant of John Thacher, who served in the Massachusetts Militia during the American Revolutionary War, Watres became active in the Sons of the American Revolution.

== Congressional service ==
In 1922, Watres was elected to the 68th United States Congress as a Republican. He was reelected three times, and served from 1923 to 1931. His service in the U.S. House was largely concerned with veterans' issues and the development of air mail and commercial aviation. As chairman of the House sub-committee responsible for aviation policy, he was the sponsor of the Watres Act, the federal law that regulated aviation from the 1920s until the creation of the Civil Aeronautics Board in the late 1930s.

He was not a candidate for renomination in 1930, and resumed the practice of law in Scranton. He maintained an interest in Republican politics, including serving as executive committee chairman of the Lackawanna County Republican Committee. He also served as a member of Pennsylvania's state Republican Committee, and made an unsuccessful run for the U.S. House in 1934.

== Retirement and death ==
Watres retired in 1951 and moved to East Orange, New Jersey. He died while vacationing in San Germán, Puerto Rico on February 6, 1964. He was interred at Glenwood Mausoleum in Clarks Summit, Pennsylvania.

U.S. House of Representatives
Preceded by Clarence D. Coughlin	Member of the U.S. House of Representatives from Pennsylvania's 11th congressional district 1923–1931	Succeeded by Patrick J. Boland
