= Texas Veterans Land Board =

The Texas Veterans Land Board, also known as VLB, is part of the Texas General Land Office. Created by the Texas Legislature in 1946, the board was established to make land available to veterans returning from World War II.

Today, the organization finances land, home loans and home improvement loans for Texas veterans and active military members who are eligible under VLB requirements.

The board is composed of a Chair and two governor appointees. Under the Texas Constitution, the Commissioner of the Texas General Land Office is the ex officio chair. As of 2024, the Chairwoman is Land Commissioner Dawn Buckingham), plus two citizens — one specializing in veterans' affairs and one in finances. The citizen members are appointed by the Governor of Texas and confirmed by the Texas Senate. Retired U.S. Navy Rear Admiral Judson "Jud" Scott and James Rothfelder are the current serving board members.

VLB also owns and manages four Texas State Veterans Cemeteries with a fifth under construction in Lubbock and the nine, soon to be ten state veterans homes that provide long-term skilled nursing care for veterans, spouses and Gold Star parents Texas State Veterans Home Program.

== History ==
In 1954, a newspaper reporter discovered that many veterans, in exchange for money, were tricked into signing loans to purchase land in several South Texas counties. Subsequent investigation of the General Land Office resulted in a major scandal. Texas Land Commissioner Bascom Giles went to prison for conspiracy to commit theft, becoming the first Texas state official to go to prison for a crime committed in office.

== Land loan program ==
The basic requirements for an applicant to participate in the Veterans Land Program are as follows:

1. At least 18 years of age
2. A bona fide and legal resident of Texas on the date of application and meet one of the following service criteria:
- An active duty military member
- A member of the Texas National Guard
- A reserve component military member having completed 20 qualifying years for retirement
- Served at least 90 days of active duty days unless discharged sooner due to service-connected disability and not discharged dishonorably
- A surviving spouse of a Veteran listed as missing in action or whose death was service-connected

Eligible Veterans may finance up to $150,000 of land for tracts that are 1-acre (4,000 m^{2}) or greater. A minimum 5% down payment is required in addition to application and appraisal fees. The interest rate for land loans as of February 2017 is 7.25%.

Disabled veterans and surviving spouses may qualify for additional interest rate deductions for housing and home improvement loans.

== Other programs ==
In 1983, the Texas Veterans Housing Assistance Program was created to offer up to $417,000 in home loan financing to Texas veterans.

In 1986, the Texas Veterans Home Improvement Program was introduced to offer Texas veterans up to $50,000 in home improvement loans. Interest rates for VLB housing and home improvement loans are posted online weekly.

Disabled veterans and surviving spouses may qualify for additional interest rate deductions for veteran home loans and home improvement loans.

The Texas Voices of Veterans Oral History Program was begun in 2008 as a means of recording and saving veterans interviews for posterity.
