= William H. McDonald =

American politician

William Henry McDonald (1899-1967) served for one term as Texas Land Commissioner from 1937 to 1939. He was elected as a Democrat.

Party political offices
Preceded by J. H. Walker	Democratic nominee for Land Commissioner of Texas; 1936	Succeeded by Bascom Giles
Political offices
Preceded by J. H. Walker	Commissioner of the Texas General Land Office; 1937–1939	Succeeded by Bascom Giles
