= Bascom Giles =

American politician (1900–1993)

James Bascom Giles (September 21, 1900 – July 7, 1993) was an American politician who was the Texas Land Commissioner from 1939 to 1955. Implicated in the Veterans' Land Board scandal, he gave up his office and served three years in prison.

== Early life ==
Giles was born near Manor, Texas, in Travis County on September 21, 1900. He was the son of Banton W. and Leora Norwood Giles. He married Effie Dean Rogan in 1921. They had two sons: J. Bascom Giles, III, and Rogan B. Giles.

== Career and public service ==
Giles entered the General Land Office in September 1919, as a draftsman. He progressed within the office and in November 1936, he became associated with the State Tax Board as chief abstractor, which position he resigned on April 8, 1938, to run for commissioner of the General Land Office. Giles was reelected eight times as a Democrat.

Giles was a mason, rising to the position of grand master of the Grand Lodge of Texas in 1949.

=== Veterans Land Board scandal ===
After World War II, Giles conceived of a plan to reward Texas' veterans with the ability to buy land at low interest rates subsidized by the taxpayers. In 1946, the voters amended the state constitution to authorize $100 million in public funds to enable veterans to buy land, creating the Texas Veterans Land Board. Under the program, qualified veterans could purchase ranch or farm land for a 5% down payment, with 40 years to pay off the balance. The state furnished the unpaid balance and held title until the veteran had retired the loan.

In November 1954, a reporter for the Cuero Record, Roland Kenneth "Ken" Towery discovered that there was fraud going on in the Texas Veterans Land program. Many of the veterans who purchased land in block sales were not even aware that they had purchased land. In fact, many were led to believe that they were getting free land as part of a veteran entitlement program or else were receiving some type of veterans' compensation from the state. Towery arranged a meeting with Giles, and before Towery could ask a question, Giles denied involvement, attributing the irregularities to local land speculators. Struck by the fact that Giles had defended himself before even being accused of anything, Towery ran the story.

Giles was reelected as land commissioner in 1954, but faced criminal investigation by Texas attorney general, John Ben Shepperd. Giles failed to appear to take the oath of office in January, 1955 and was eventually convicted of fraud and bribery and served three years of a six-year prison term. Towery won the Pulitzer Prize for his investigative reporting.

== Final years ==
Giles moved to Venice, Florida, where he died in a car accident in 1993.

Party political offices
Preceded by William H. McDonald	Democratic nominee for Land Commissioner of Texas; 1938, 1940, 1942, 1944, 1946, 1948, 1950, 1952, 1954	Succeeded by James Earl Rudder
Preceded by Charles F. Adams	Republican nominee for Land Commissioner of Texas; 1952	Vacant Title next held by Axtell Byles
Political offices
Preceded by William H. McDonald	Texas Land Commissioner; 1939–1955	Succeeded by James Earl Rudder
