= 109th Infantry Regiment (United States) =

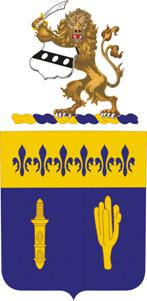
- Coat of arms
- Active: 1877–present
- Country: United States
- Allegiance: Pennsylvania
- Type: Infantry regiment
- Part of: Pennsylvania Army National Guard
- Nickname: Thirteenth Pennsylvania (special designation)
- Motto: "Cives Arma Ferant" (Let the Citizens Bear Arms)
- Engagements: World War I World War II; Iraq War
- Decorations: Presidential Unit Citation (Army); French Croix de Guerre with Palm, World War II; Luxembourg Croix de Guerre

Commanders
- Notable commanders: James Earl Rudder

Insignia
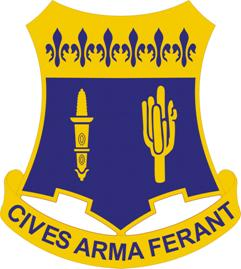
- Distinctive unit insignia

The 109th Infantry Regiment ("Thirteenth Pennsylvania") is a parent infantry regiment of the United States Army, represented in the Pennsylvania Army National Guard by the 1st Battalion, 109th Infantry, part of the 2nd Brigade Combat Team, 28th Infantry Division.

Headquartered at Scranton for the duration of its existence, the regiment was formed as the Scranton City Guards Battalion of the Pennsylvania National Guard in 1877, and expanded into the 13th Infantry Regiment, Pennsylvania National Guard a year later. It was called up for the Spanish–American War as the 13th Pennsylvania Volunteer Infantry Regiment, but did not serve overseas, and again to guard the Mexican border in 1916. The 13th combined with another Pennsylvania regiment to form the new 109th Infantry in 1917 for service in World War I with the 28th Division.

Demobilized after the end of World War I, the 13th Infantry was briefly reorganized in the Pennsylvania National Guard before regaining its World War I designation in 1921, part of the reorganized 28th Division. As a result of World War II, it was again mobilized with the division in early 1941. After the end of the war, the 109th was reorganized at Scranton in 1946, being called up as a result of the Korean War to replace Regular Army units sent to Korea.

== History ==
=== Origins ===
The 109th was organized on 14 August 1877 as the Scranton City Guards Battalion, a unit of the Pennsylvania National Guard based at Scranton. On 23 September 1878, it was expanded, reorganized, and redesignated to become the 13th Infantry Regiment. By 1898, it included eight companies: A, B, C, D, F, and H at Scranton, E at Honesdale, and G at Montrose. The regiment formed part of the Third Brigade of the Pennsylvania National Guard division.

In response to President William McKinley's proclamation calling for volunteers to serve in the Spanish–American War, the regiment encamped at Mount Gretna on 28 April, where it joined the rest of the Pennsylvania National Guard to be mustered into Federal service. At Mount Gretna, it accepted recruits to increase the strength of each company to three officers and 75 men. All companies except for Company A and the regimental headquarters were mustered into Federal service on 12 May, followed by the latter on the next day. In Federal service, the regiment was designated the 13th Pennsylvania Volunteer Infantry Regiment.

External image
- Spanish-American War flags of the regiment

The 13th Pennsylvania departed Mount Gretna for Camp Alger in northern Virginia on 19 May and arrived there the next day. There, it was assigned to the Third Brigade of the First Division of the Second Army Corps, along with the 8th and 12th Pennsylvania. Colonel Henry A. Coursen, the 13th Pennsylvania regimental commander, temporarily served as brigade commander until 25 June. Meanwhile, on 1 June, the regiment expanded the enlisted strength of each company to 106 men through recruiting.

The regiment moved its camp from Camp Alger to a location near Dunn Loring station on 19 July, then relocated to Camp George G. Meade in Pennsylvania on 31 August. While stationed at the latter, the regiment participated in the 27 October Philadelphia Peace Jubilee celebration to commemorate the cessation of hostilities. The 13th Pennsylvania again relocated to Camp MacKenzie near Augusta, Georgia, on 14 November, where it was mustered out of Federal service on 11 March 1899. After mustering out, the regiment returned to Scranton two days later via Washington, D.C., and Harrisburg.

The 13th was reorganized in northeastern Pennsylvania between 21 June and 20 August of that year. For service on the Mexican border, it was mustered into Federal service on 26 September 1916 at Mount Gretna. Returning from the border, the regiment was drafted into Federal service on 5 August 1917 after American entry into World War I. It was consolidated with the 1st Infantry Regiment of the Pennsylvania National Guard on 11 October 1917 to become the 109th Infantry of the 28th Division.

Capt. Mackey, Commander of 3rd Battalion, 109th Inf. at his telephone. Fismes, France, August 1918

=== World War I ===
In the First World War, the regiment arrived in France in May, 1918, and was engaged in combat during the Second Battle of the Marne (14–18 July 1918) in the vicinity of Bois le Rois commune, in the Seine et Marne department, as well as during the Meuse-Argonne offensive, the principal engagement of the American Expeditionary Forces during World War I, from September until the end of the war on 11 November 1918.

During combat near Baslieux-lès-Fismes in September 1918, Laurence Hawley Watres, then commander of a company in the 108th Machine Gun Battalion, and a former member of the 109th Infantry, took the initiative to assume command of Company D, 109th Infantry, which had lost all its officers and was falling into disorganization. He combined Company D with soldiers from his own company, then led an ad hoc attack that resulted in numerous enemy killed, wounded, and taken prisoner, as well as the capture of several machine gun nests. Watres subsequently received the Distinguished Service Cross to recognize his heroism.

The 109th Infantry returned to the Port of New York aboard the USS Maui on 3 May 1919. The regiment was demobilized at Camp Dix, New Jersey between 17 and 20 May.

=== Between the wars ===
The former 13th Infantry Regiment was reorganized between 1919 and 1920 as a Pennsylvania National Guard unit in northeastern Pennsylvania designated the 13th Infantry. It was redesignated as the 109th Infantry on 1 April 1921, joining the reorganized 28th Division as part of its 55th Infantry Brigade. Its headquarters was Federally recognized at Wilkes-Barre on 20 December of that year. The regimental headquarters relocated to Scranton in 1923. The regiment participated in summer training at Mount Gretna between 1921 and 1934. It participated in the Third Corps Area concentration of the First Army maneuver, held from 10 August to 3 September 1935 at Indiantown Gap and Mount Gretna, which involved 20,000 troops, mostly from the 28th and 29th Divisions. It was called up for relief duty in western Pennsylvania between 17 March and 9 April 1936 after the Schuylkill and Susquehanna Rivers flooded, along with the rest of the division. Summer training was moved to Indiantown Gap between 1936 and 1938. Between 5 and 19 August 1939, the regiment participated in the Third Corps Area concentration of the First Army maneuvers at Manassas, involving 24,700 troops, mostly from the 28th and 29th Divisions. With the division, the 109th participated in the First Army maneuvers in western New York between 4 and 25 August 1940, which involved 81,000 troops from the entire army.

=== World War II ===
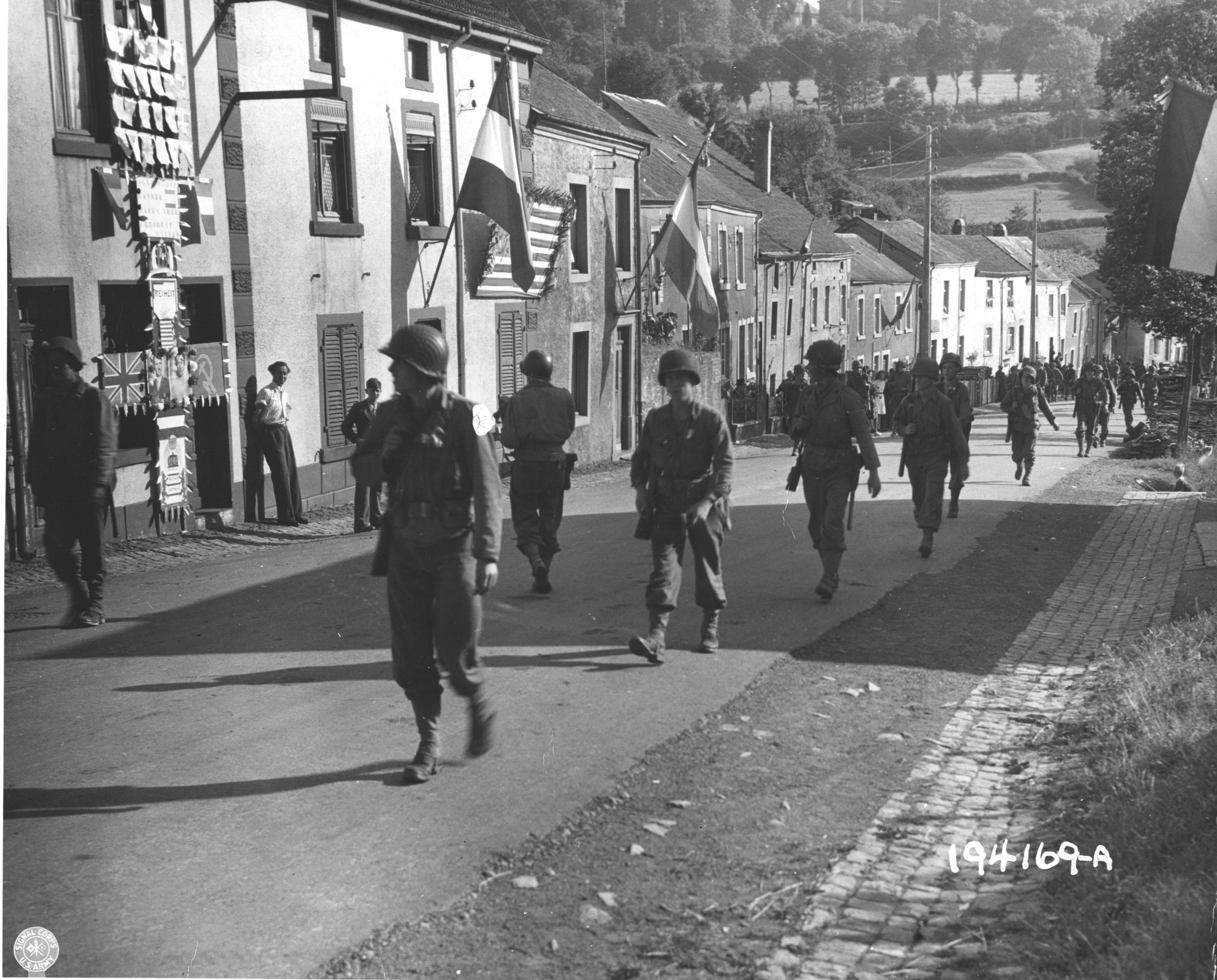
Infantrymen of 2nd Infantry Battalion, 109th Regiment, pass through Witte, Luxemburg. September 1944

As a result of World War II, the 109th was mobilized with the rest of the National Guard and inducted into Federal service at Scranton on 17 February 1941. It assembled with the division at Indiantown Gap, arriving there on 1 March. The regiment absorbed 194 draftees, mostly from New York and New Jersey with a small number of Southerners, in June. With the division, it participated in the Carolina Maneuvers between 6 October and 1 November. The 28th Division was redesignated as the 28th Infantry Division on 17 February 1942.

During its participation in the European Theater of Operations in the Second World War, the 109th Regiment served across France and through the Hurtgen Forest of Germany; elements of the Regiment led the Division into the Rhineland to become the first troops to invade German soil since Napoleon. The 109th Infantry won battle honors at Normandy, Northern France, Ardennes-Alsace, the Rhineland and Central Europe and they were honored with the Luxemburg Croix de Guerre and the French Croix de Guerre for action at the Colmar Pocket. Eddie Slovik, a member of this regiment was the only American soldier executed for desertion in the 20th century.

After the end of the war, it was inactivated at Camp Shelby, Mississippi on 22 October 1945.

=== Cold War ===
The 109th Infantry Regiment was reorganized and Federally recognized with headquarters at Scranton on 16 December 1946. It was ordered into active Federal service 5 September 1950 to replace Regular Army units fighting in the Korean War. While the 109th was on active duty, a replacement 109th Infantry was organized and Federally recognized on 6 July 1953 with headquarters at Scranton as a unit of the National Guard of the United States (NGUS). The 109th was released from active Federal service on 15 June 1954 and reverted to state control, with the NGUS 109th simultaneously dissolving.

The infantry regiment was deemed too unwieldy for the Cold War battlefield by the United States Army, and the regiment was reorganized as a parent regiment of the Combat Arms Regimental System on 1 June 1959, eliminating the regimental headquarters. Under the Pentomic reorganization of the army, the 1st Battle Group, 109th Infantry remained as part of the 28th Infantry Division. Before the reorganization, the regiment included about 1,800 personnel, reduced to 914 after conversion to the 1st Battle Group (BG). The Headquarters and Headquarters Companies (HHC) of the regiment and the 1st Battalion and the Medical and Service Companies at Scranton were combined to form the HHC of the 1st BG. The Heavy Mortar Company of the 109th at Scranton and West Pittston became the Combat Support Company of the 1st BG. Companies F and G of the 109th combined to form Company A of the 1st BG at East Stroudsburg. Companies B and E of the 109th at Scranton and Carbondale, respectively, retained their letters with the 1st BG, while Companies A and C of the 109th became Company C of the 1st BG at Scranton, and the 2nd Battalion HHC and Company H of the 109th became Company D of the 1st BG at Carbondale and Honesdale. The 3rd Battalion, 109th Infantry at Milton, Berwick, and Williamsport became the 154th Transportation Battalion. Company D of the 109th at Plymouth became Company D of the 165th Military Police Battalion, while the Tank Company of the 109th at Nanticoke became Battery B (155mm), 2nd Howitzer Battalion, 109th Field Artillery.

As a result of the Reorganization Objective Army Division plan, battle groups were replaced by battalions and on 1 April 1963 the 1st Battle Group became the 1st Battalion, 109th Infantry (1-109th Infantry) and the 2nd Battalion, 109th Infantry was activated; both battalions were part of the 28th. A 3rd Battalion was activated on 24 March 1964 as a non-divisional unit, but was eliminated on 17 February 1968. The 3rd Battalion was reactivated as a 28th Division unit on 1 April 1975. The 109th was reorganized under the United States Army Regimental System on 5 April 1988.

=== 1990s and 21st century ===
The 2nd Battalion was converted into the 2nd Battalion, 103rd Armor on 1 March 1992, and the 3rd Battalion similarly became the 3rd Battalion, 103rd Armor on 1 October 1995, leaving only the 1-109th Infantry. The 1-109th was ordered into active Federal service between 28 and 31 May 2002 for duty in Bosnia with the Stabilisation Force, along with the 28th Infantry Division headquarters, the 104th Infantry Detachment, and 1st Squadron, 104th Cavalry. After two months of training at Indiantown Gap, the units conducted additional training at Fort Dix and Hohenfels before arriving in Bosnia at the end of August to take over responsibility for Multi-National Division (North). The 1-109th returned to Pennsylvania in March 2003, and was released from active Federal service on 20 May, reverting to state control.

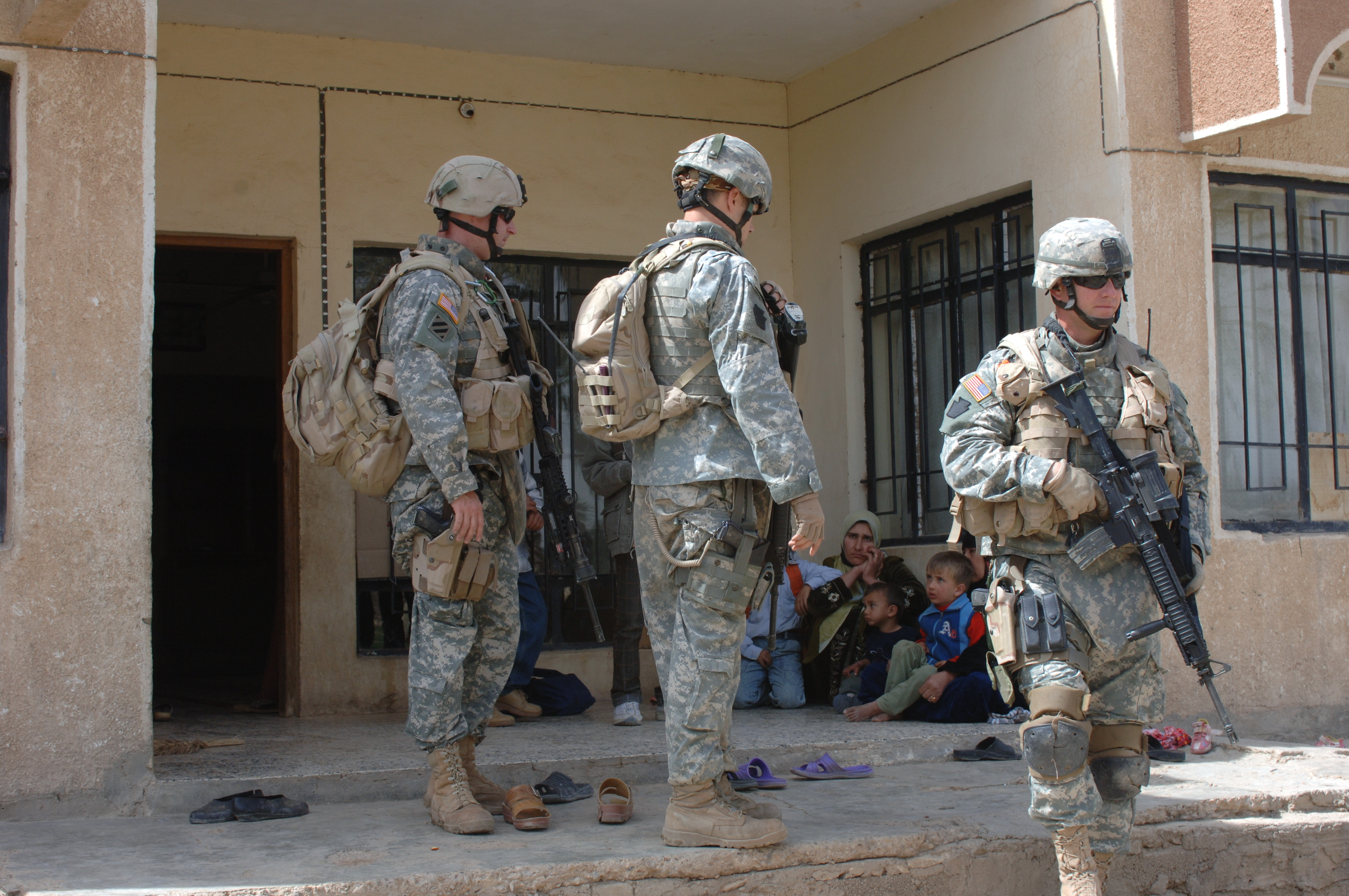
Soldiers of Company B of the 1-109th on foot patrol in a village near FOB Diamond near Ramadi, March 2006

The 1-109th was ordered into active Federal service on 22 January 2005 for a deployment to Iraq in support of Operation Iraqi Freedom with the 2nd Brigade Combat Team, 28th Infantry Division, then the largest Pennsylvania National Guard combat deployment since World War II. Five soldiers of Company B were killed in Ramadi on 28 September when their M2A2 Bradley detonated an IED while providing security for the building of a railway bridge and was set on fire by rocket-propelled grenades and small-arms fire. On 1 October, the army officially reintroduced the designation of regiment to parent regiments, with the 109th Infantry becoming the 109th Infantry Regiment. Returning to the United States after a year in Iraq with the brigade, the 1-109th was released from active Federal service on 20 July 2006, reverting to state control.

As a result of the creation of modular combat brigades by the reorganization plan of United States Army, the 1-109th was assigned to the 55th Brigade Combat Team, 28th Infantry Division on 1 September 2007. The battalion was ordered into active Federal service on 6 October 2012 for a deployment to Kuwait, in which it provided security at Camp Buehring. Returning to the United States after eight months there, the 1-109th was released from active Federal service on 25 November 2013, reverting to state control. On 1 September 2016, the battalion was transferred back to the 2nd Brigade Combat Team, 28th Infantry Division again after the 55th became the 55th Maneuver Enhancement Brigade.

== Distinctive unit insignia ==
- Description

A Gold color metal and enamel device 1 1/8 inches (2.9 cm) in height overall consisting of a shield blazoned: Azure in fess, a sheathed Roman sword, point to base, and a giant cactus Or; on a chief of the last six fleurs-de-lis of the field. Attached below the shield a Gold scroll inscribed "CIVES ARMA FERANT" in Blue letters.

- Symbolism

The shield is blue for Infantry. The sheathed Roman sword, taken from the Spanish War Service Medal, indicates the service during the Spanish–American War, the cactus denotes the service on the Mexican Border and the chief with the six fleurs-de-lis symbolizes the six battle honors during World War I.

- Background

The distinctive unit insignia was approved on 11 June 1929. It was amended to correct the description on 6 July 1929.

== Coat of arms ==
=== Blazon ===
- Shield

Azure, in fess a sheathed Roman sword, point to base, and a giant cactus Or; on a chief of the last six fleurs-de-lis of the field.

- Crest

That for the regiments and separate battalions of the Pennsylvania Army National Guard: On a wreath of the colors (Or and Azure) a lion rampant guardant Proper holding in dexter paw a naked scimitar Argent, hilted Or, and in sinister an escutcheon Argent on a fess Sable three plates.

- Motto

CIVES ARMA FERANT (Let the Citizens Bear Arms).

=== Symbolism ===
- Shield

The shield is blue for Infantry. The sheathed Roman sword, taken from the Spanish War Service Medal, indicates the service during the Spanish–American War, the cactus denotes the service on the Mexican Border and the chief with the six fleurs-de-lis symbolizes the six battle honors during World War I.

- Crest

The crest is that of the Pennsylvania Army National Guard.

=== Background ===
The coat of arms was approved on 2 July 1929.

== Medal of Honor ==
One soldier, Technical Sergeant Francis J. Clark of Company K, received the Medal of Honor for his actions from the 12th to the 18th of September 1944 while serving with the 109th Infantry during the Siegfried Line Campaign.
