= J. H. Walker =

American politician (1860–1947)

James Hemphill Walker (June 15, 1860 - June 14, 1947) was Texas Land Commissioner from 1929 - 1936. Due to his leadership, he kept thousands of Texas families from losing their homes during the Great Depression.

== Early life ==
Walker was born in Johnson County, Texas, to Phillip and Elizabeth (Cooper) Walker. He studied the classics and languages in college and worked for a time as a teacher before joining the Texas General Land Office as a Spanish-language translator in 1899.

== Career in public service ==
Walker served as Chief Clerk of the State Comptroller of Public Account's Office from 1901 - 1903 and then served as a financial agent for the Texas Prison System until 1907. Walker returned to the General Land Office and served as Legal Examiner from 1907 - 1909. In 1909, James T. Robison appointed Walker as his Chief Clerk. Walker served in that post until Robison's death in 1929, when Governor Dan Moody appointed him to succeed Robison as Commissioner. According to his official biography, "Walker and Robison had worked so closely for the preceding twenty years, Mr. Walker had little difficulty assuming the responsibilities or keeping course on directions set during the previous two decades."

Walker ran as a Democrat and was elected as Commissioner in 1930 and re-elected in 1932 and 1934. The main functions of the office during Walker's tenure as Commissioner reflected the increased interest in managing oil and gas-producing lands, as well as the public lands of the land-grant colleges: (University of Texas and Texas A&M University). During the Great Depression, he successfully persuaded the School Land Board not to evict lessees on their lands who were unemployed and could not make their payments. As a result of this, Walker is credited with keeping thousands of families from losing their homes.

In 1936, Walker announced that he would not seek reelection. From 1936 until his death in 1947, Walker served as Land Officer of the University of Texas.

Walker died on June 14, 1947, and was buried at the Texas State Cemetery in Austin, Texas.

Party political offices
Preceded by James T. Robison	Democratic nominee for Land Commissioner of Texas; 1930, 1932, 1934	Succeeded by William H. McDonald
Political offices
Preceded by James T. Robison	Commissioner of the Texas General Land Office; 1929–1937	Succeeded by William H. McDonald
