= John J. Terrell =

16th Texas Land Commissioner (1857–1920)

John James Terrell
- Born: January 28, 1857; Wise County, Texas
- Died: June 17, 1920 (aged 63); Sacramento, California
- Burial place: Oakwood Cemetery, Austin, Texas
- Title: 16th Texas Land Commissioner
- Term: January 10, 1903 – January 11, 1909
- Predecessor: Charles Rogan
- Successor: James T. Robison
- Political party: Democratic Party

John J. Terrell (1857–1920) served as the 16th Texas Land Commissioner, from 1903 until 1909. Elected in 1902, he was re-elected in 1904 and 1906.

After stepping down as Texas Lands Commissioner, President Woodrow Wilson appointed him Inspector of Indian Lands at Arizona's San Carlos Apache Reservation.

He died while on a business trip to Sacramento, California, on June 17, 1920, due to injuries he received in an automobile accident.

Political offices
Preceded by Charles Rogan	Commissioner of the Texas General Land Office; 1903–1909	Succeeded by James T. Robison
