= Charles Rogan =

15th Texas Land Commissioner (1858–1932)

- Born: February 3, 1858; Ripley, Mississippi
- Died: January 12, 1932 (aged 73); Austin, Texas
- Burial place: Oakwood Cemetery, Austin, Texas
- Title: 15th Texas Land Commissioner
- Term: May 15, 1899 – January 10, 1903
- Predecessor: George W. Finger
- Successor: John J. Terrell
- Political party: Democratic Party

Charles Rogan (1858–1932) served as the 15th Texas land commissioner, from 1899 until 1903. He was born near Ripley, Mississippi, on February 3, 1858; he moved with his parents to Texas in 1862. He was a member of the 1879 inaugural graduating class of Texas A&M College. He attended Harvard Law School from 1881 to 1883.

In 1890, Rogan was elected to Texas's 77th House of Representatives district, which at the time included Brown and Comanche counties, as part of the 22nd Texas Legislature, serving from 1891 to 1893.

In 1899, Texas governor Joseph Sayers appointed him as Texas land commissioner, to replace George W. Finger who had died in office. Rogan subsequently stood as land commissioner in the 1900 general election, and was elected.

After stepping down as Texas lands commissioner, he returned to private practice as a lawyer in Austin.

He died at his home, in Austin, on January 12, 1932. He is buried in Austin's Oakwood Cemetery.

Political offices
Preceded by George W. Finger	Commissioner of the Texas General Land Office; 1899–1903	Succeeded by John J. Terrell
