= James T. Robison =

American politician (1861–1929)

James Thomas Robison
- Born: September 30, 1861; Cass County, Texas
- Died: September 7, 1929 (aged 67); New London, Connecticut
- Burial place: Oakwood Cemetery, Austin, Texas
- Title: 17th Texas Land Commissioner
- Term: January 11, 1909 – September 7, 1929 (died in office)
- Predecessor: John J. Terrell
- Successor: J. H. Walker
- Political party: Democratic Party

James T. Robison (1861–1929) served as the 17th Texas Land Commissioner, from 1909 until he died in office in 1929.

From Jan 13, 1891 to Jan 10, 1893, he served as a legislator in the 22nd Texas Legislature, as a Democratic member of the House, representing the 17th District.

Party political offices
Preceded by John J. Terrell	Democratic nominee for Land Commissioner of Texas; 1908, 1910, 1912, 1914, 1916, 1918, 1920, 1922, 1924, 1926, 1928	Succeeded by J. H. Walker
Political offices
Preceded by John J. Terrell	Commissioner of the Texas General Land Office; 1909–1929	Succeeded by J. H. Walker
