= Veterans' Land Board scandal =

The Veterans Land Board Scandal was a political scandal in Texas in that became public in 1954.

The Texas Legislature enacted the Veterans Land Act in November 1946 which created the Texas Veterans Land Board as a division of the General Land Office (GLO). The measure called for issuing $25 million in bonds, the proceeds of which would be used by the state government to purchase land and resell it to veterans of World War II at 3% interest on 40 year loans. In early 1951 another $75 million was appropriated by the state for this purpose. The only stipulations on the purchase was that the loan could not be for more than $7,500 and the tracts of land could not be less than 20 acres (80,000 m²). A 5% downpayment was required, and the land could not be resold for three years. The law allowed for "block sales," whereby veterans could join together to buy the land. This was allowed because it would be difficult to buy 20 acres (80,000 m²) with only $7,500.

The scandal was unveiled in November 1954 when reporter Ken Towery, then managing editor of the Cuero Record, published the results of his investigation of a tip that prominent Cuero-area businessmen were entertaining local Hispanic and African-American laborers, an unheard of thing in South Texas at this time. The businessmen were paying the laborers, who were veterans and mostly illiterate, to sign applications for the land grants and the businessmen would pocket the money. Many of the veterans who purchased land in block sales were not even aware that they had purchased land. In fact, many were led to believe that they were getting free land as part of a veteran entitlement program or else were receiving some type of veterans' compensation from the state. When Towery asked Texas Veterans Land Board chairman (and Texas General Land Office commissioner) Bascom Giles about these irregularities, Giles denied involvement, attributing the irregularities to local land speculators. Struck by the fact that Giles had defended himself before even being accused of anything, Towrey ran with the story, accelerating an investigation begun the previous year by the state attorney general, John Ben Shepperd.

Fraud was soon discovered in nine south Texas counties, and numerous members of the General Land Office were charged with fraud and conspiracy to defraud veterans. Giles was imprisoned for his role in the scandal, and many others paid heavy fines for their crimes. Governor Allan Shivers and John Ben Sheppard, as ex officio members of the Veterans Land Board, were tainted by the scandal. Ralph Yarborough and his allies in the liberal wing of the Texas Democratic Party pointed to the scandal as an example of the kind of corruption that the conservative Shivercrats were willing to overlook. Towery, himself a veteran, would be awarded the 1955 Pulitzer Prize for his uncovering of the scandal.

== See also ==
- List of federal political scandals in the United States
