= 55th Maneuver Enhancement Brigade =

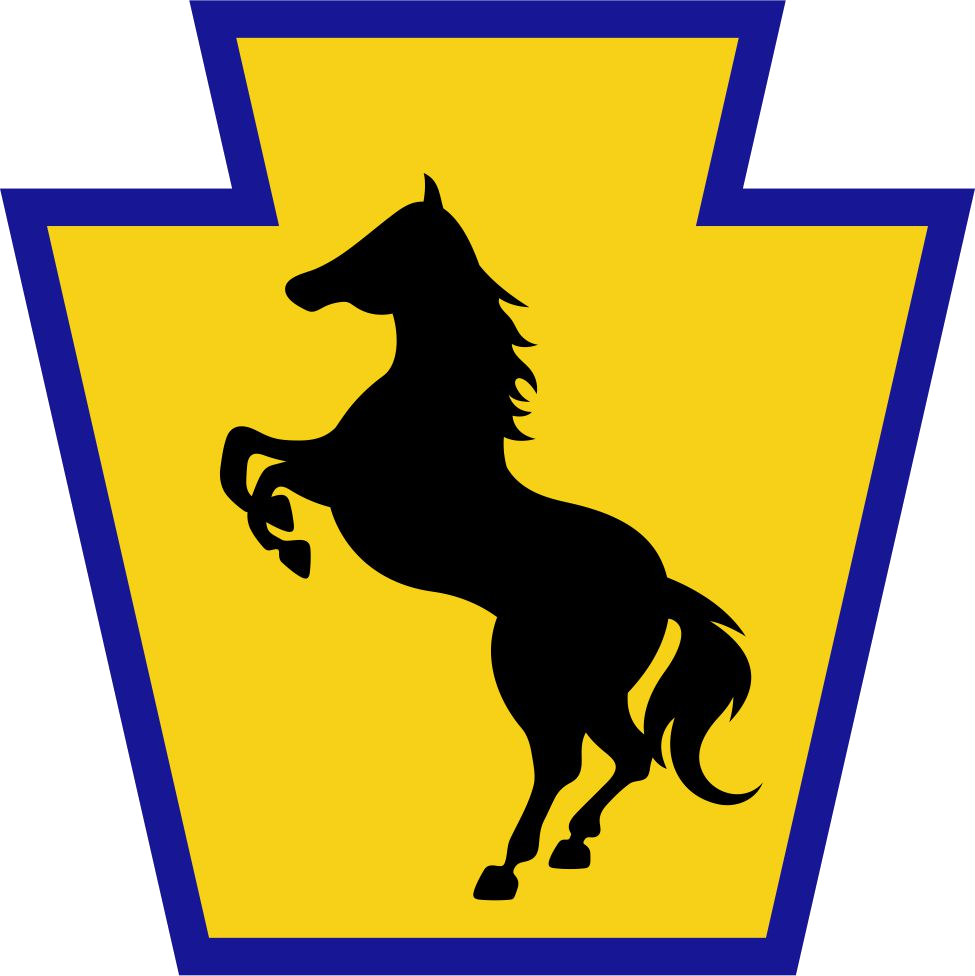
- Shoulder sleeve insignia (SSI)
- Active: 29 July 1898–22 October 1945; 17 December 1946–present
- Country: United States
- Allegiance: Pennsylvania Army National Guard
- Branch: United States Army National Guard
- Type: Maneuver enhancement
- Size: Brigade
- Part of: 28th Infantry Division (United States)
- Garrison/HQ: Scranton Armed Forces Reserve Center
- Engagements: World War I; Champagne-Marne; Aisne-Marne; Oise-Aisne; Meuse-Argonne; Champagne 1918; Lorraine 1918; World War II; Normandy; Northern France; Rhineland; Ardennes-Alsace; Operation Joint Forge

Insignia
- 28th Infantry Division SSI, previously worn by the 55th MEB

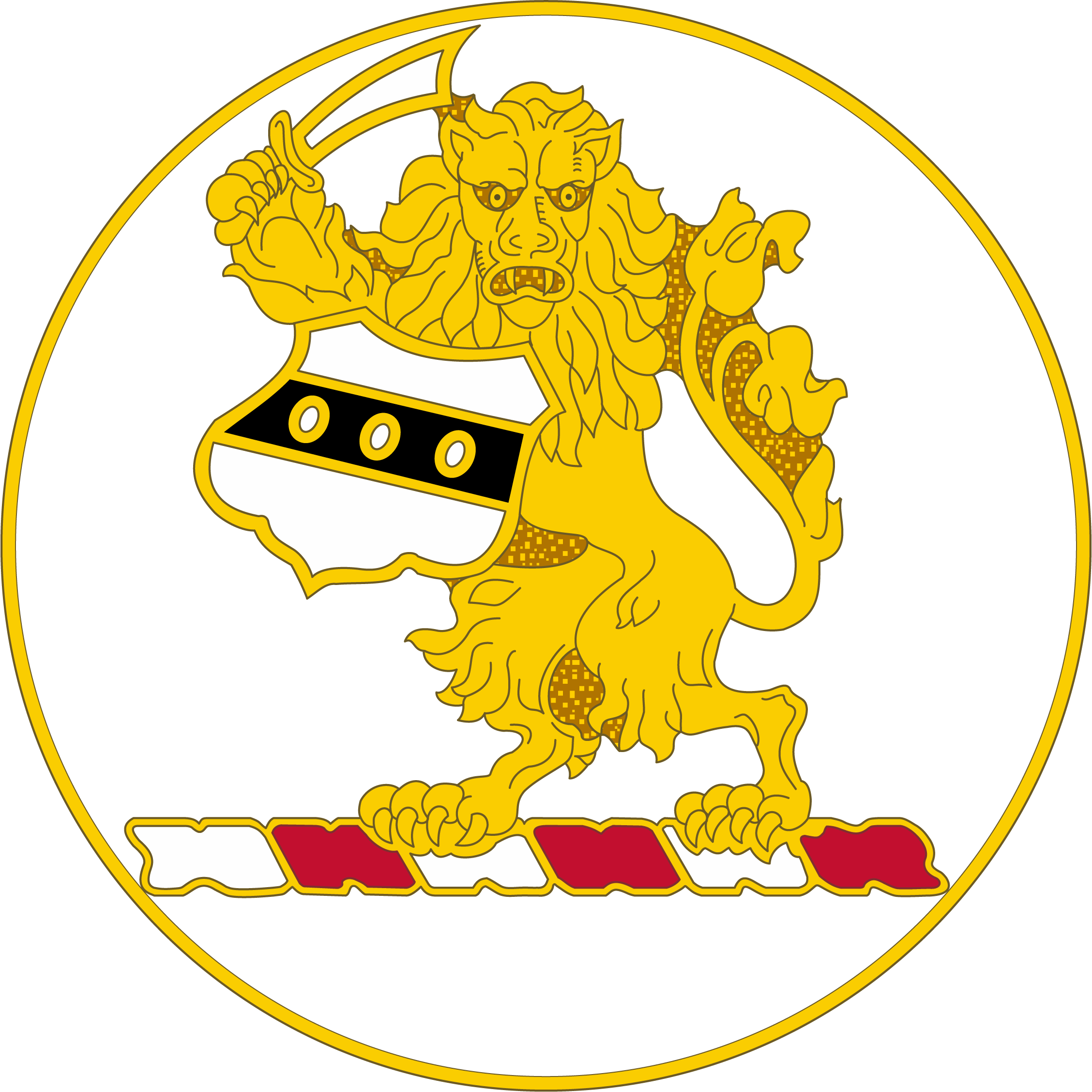
- 55th MEB Distinctive Unit Insignia

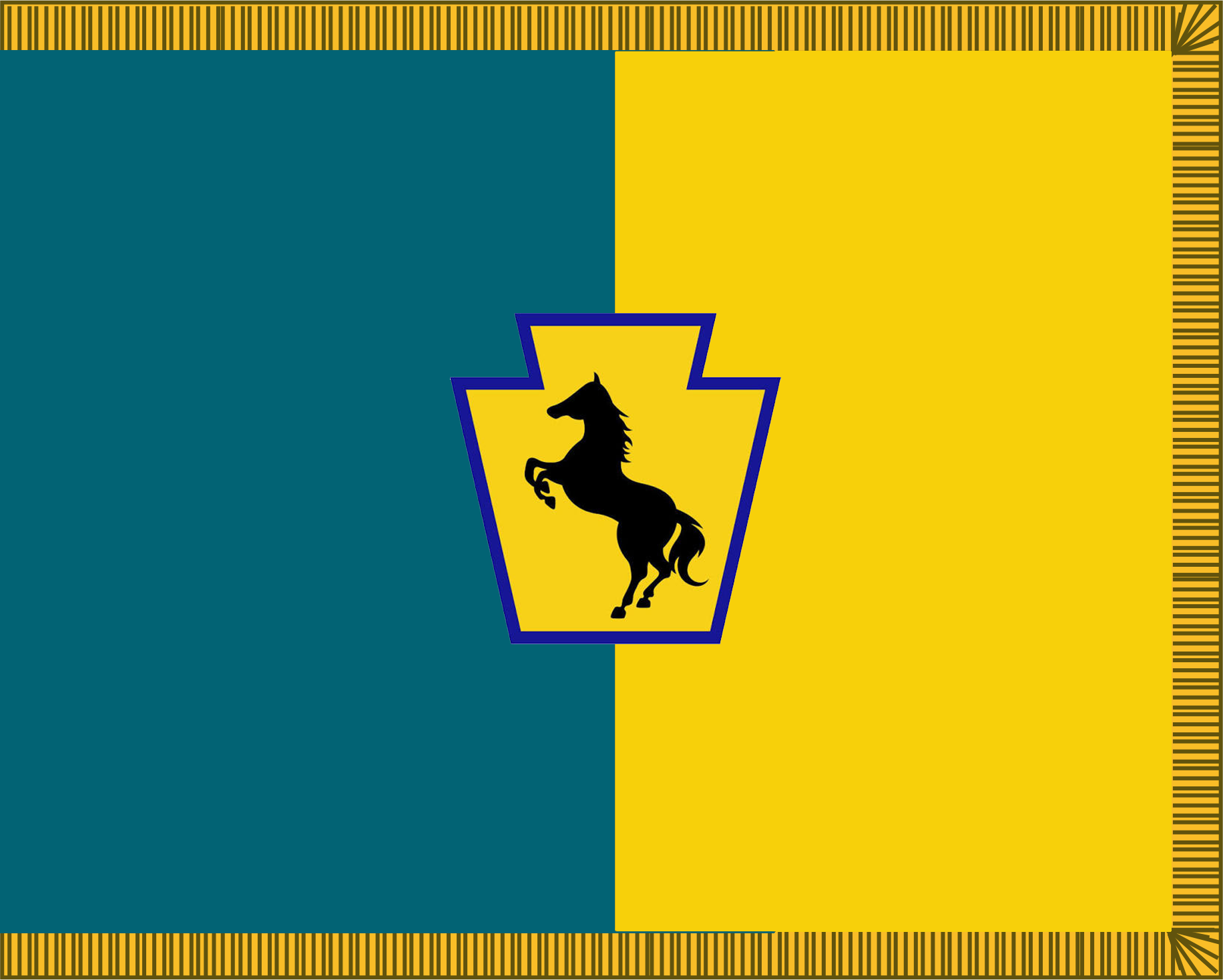
- 55th Maneuver Enhancement Brigade Flag

The 55th Maneuver Enhancement Brigade (55th MEB) is a maneuver enhancement unit aligned under the 28th Infantry Division (28th ID) of the Pennsylvania Army National Guard. The 55th MEB, like all MEBs, is a self-contained, modular, and multifunctional support brigade of the United States Army with an ability to plug into operational formations commanded by corps or division commanders, to support brigade combat teams once deployed, and to conduct tactical level tasks and support. MEBs are equipped to provide command and control for up to seven battalions that are capable of owning battlespace in combat. The 55th MEB was once the 55th Heavy Brigade Combat Team "strike brigade" subordinate to the 28th ID, as the 55th MEB is today. Its headquarters is in Scranton, PA.

Pennsylvania's 7th Division moved to Camp Hancock, Georgia, in April 1917, and was there when the entire division was federalized on 5 August 1917. From May to 11 October 1917, the division was reorganized into the two-brigade, four regiment scheme, and thus became the 28th Division. It thus comprised the 55th Infantry Brigade (109th and 110th Infantry Regiments) and the 56th Infantry Brigade (111th and 112th Infantry Regiments).

== History ==
The history of the brigade headquarters began in July 1898 with the organization of Company K, 11th Pennsylvania Infantry Regiment in Scranton. In August, 1899 the company was re-designated as Company K, 13th Pennsylvania Infantry.

In September, 1916 Company K was activated for service on the Mexico–United States border during the Pancho Villa Expedition. Company K was activated again for federal service in August, 1917. In October, 1917 Company K, 13th Pennsylvania was combined with Company K, 1st Pennsylvania Infantry, and the new unit was re-designated as Company K, 109th Infantry. The 109th Infantry Regiment fought in France during World War I as part of the 28th Infantry Division, and was demobilized in May, 1919.

In July, 1920 the unit was reorganized as Company K, 13th Pennsylvania Infantry Regiment, and a 1921 reorganization resulted in Company K being renamed Company B, 109th Infantry Regiment.

In February, 1941 the 109th Infantry was activated for service in World War II. The regiment fought in the European Theater as part of the 28th Infantry Division, and was demobilized in October, 1945.

The 109th Infantry was activated with the 28th Infantry Division during the Korean War, and served in West Germany from 1950 until returning home in 1954.

In June, 1959 Company B was reorganized and designated Company B, 1st Battle Group, 109th Infantry.

Company B was re-designated Headquarters, 3rd Brigade, 28th Infantry Division in April, 1963. In February 1968 3rd Brigade was renamed the 55th Brigade.

== Campaign participation credit ==
=== World War I ===
- Champagne-Marne
- Aisne-Marne
- Oise-Aisne
- Meuse-Argonne
- Champagne 1918
- Lorraine 1918

=== World War II ===
- Normandy
- Northern France
- Rhineland
- Ardennes-Alsace
- Central Europe

== Decorations ==
- French Croix de Guerre with Palm, Streamer embroidered COLMAR (109th Infantry cited, Department of the Army General Order 43, 1950)
- Luxembourg Croix de Guerre, Streamer embroidered LUXEMBOURG (109th Infantry cited, Department of the Army General Order 43, 1950)

== Recent events ==
Today the 55th Brigade is headquartered at the Scranton Armed Forces Reserve Center, 3401 Olyphant Adams Avenue, Scranton, Pennsylvania 18509, where the 1-109th Infantry (Scranton) and the 337th Engineer Battalion are also located. It moved from the historic Watres Armory on Adams Avenue in 2012 where it had been headquartered since 1900. During the move, the brigade commander COL Konzman discovered there was a time capsule in a cornerstone of the facility and had it removed. The documents contained in the capsule were protected and are now kept at the new facility. The 55th Brigade has a strength of about 3,600 soldiers. The brigade's units are concentrated in Northeastern Pennsylvania. Appropriately, the soldiers of the 109th Infantry Regiment, the element from which the 55th was born, earned the nickname "Men of Iron" for their three-day defense against overwhelming odds during the Champagne-Marne Offensive in World War I.

55th Brigade Soldiers and units took part in Operation Joint Forge in Bosnia-Herzegovina in 2002 and 2003.

Soldiers from the 55th Brigade have participated in operations since the September 11 attacks, both as individuals and as members of units. These activations include Operations Noble Eagle, Enduring Freedom, Iraqi Freedom and New Dawn.

In 2002-03, the 55th Brigade led "Taskforce Keystone," a major deployment of about 2,000 soldiers of the 28th Infantry Division to Europe to provide force protection and enhanced security in the wake of the September 11 attacks. While Task Force Keystone was on duty, another 1,100 soldiers from the 28th Division served as the core of the American peacekeeping presence in Bosnia.

3rd Battalion, 103rd Armor served in Afghanistan in 2008, and was awarded the Meritorious Unit Commendation. In 2012 and 2013, approximately two Battalions of the 55th Armored Brigade Combat Team deployed to Kuwait to conduct security operations at several logistical bases in support of Operation Enduring Freedom.

The 55th Infantry Brigade was redesignated as the 55th Maneuver Enhancement Brigade in 2016.

== Organization ==
- 55th Maneuver Enhancement Brigade, in Scranton
  - Headquarters Support Company, 55th Maneuver Enhancement Brigade, in Scranton
    - Detachment 1, Headquarters Support Company, 55th Maneuver Enhancement Brigade, in Lehighton
  - 213th Signal Company, in Tobyhanna
  - 165th Military Police Battalion, at Fort Indiantown Gap
    - Headquarters and Headquarters Detachment, 165th Military Police Battalion, at Fort Indiantown Gap
    - 28th Military Police Company (Combat Support), in Friedens
    - 1069th Military Police Company (Combat Support), in Sellersville
      - Detachment 1, 1069th Military Police Company (Combat Support), at Fort Indiantown Gap
  - 337th Engineer Battalion, in Danville
    - Headquarters and Headquarters Company, 337th Engineer Battalion, in Danville
    - Forward Support Company, 337th Engineer Battalion, in Scranton
    - 128th Chemical Company, in Philadelphia
    - 192nd Engineer Detachment (Fire Fighting Team — Fire Truck), at Fort Indiantown Gap
    - 228th Engineer Company (Vertical Construction Company), at Fort Indiantown Gap
