= Texas General Land Office =

Government agency in U.S. state of Texas

- Seal of the Texas General Land Office

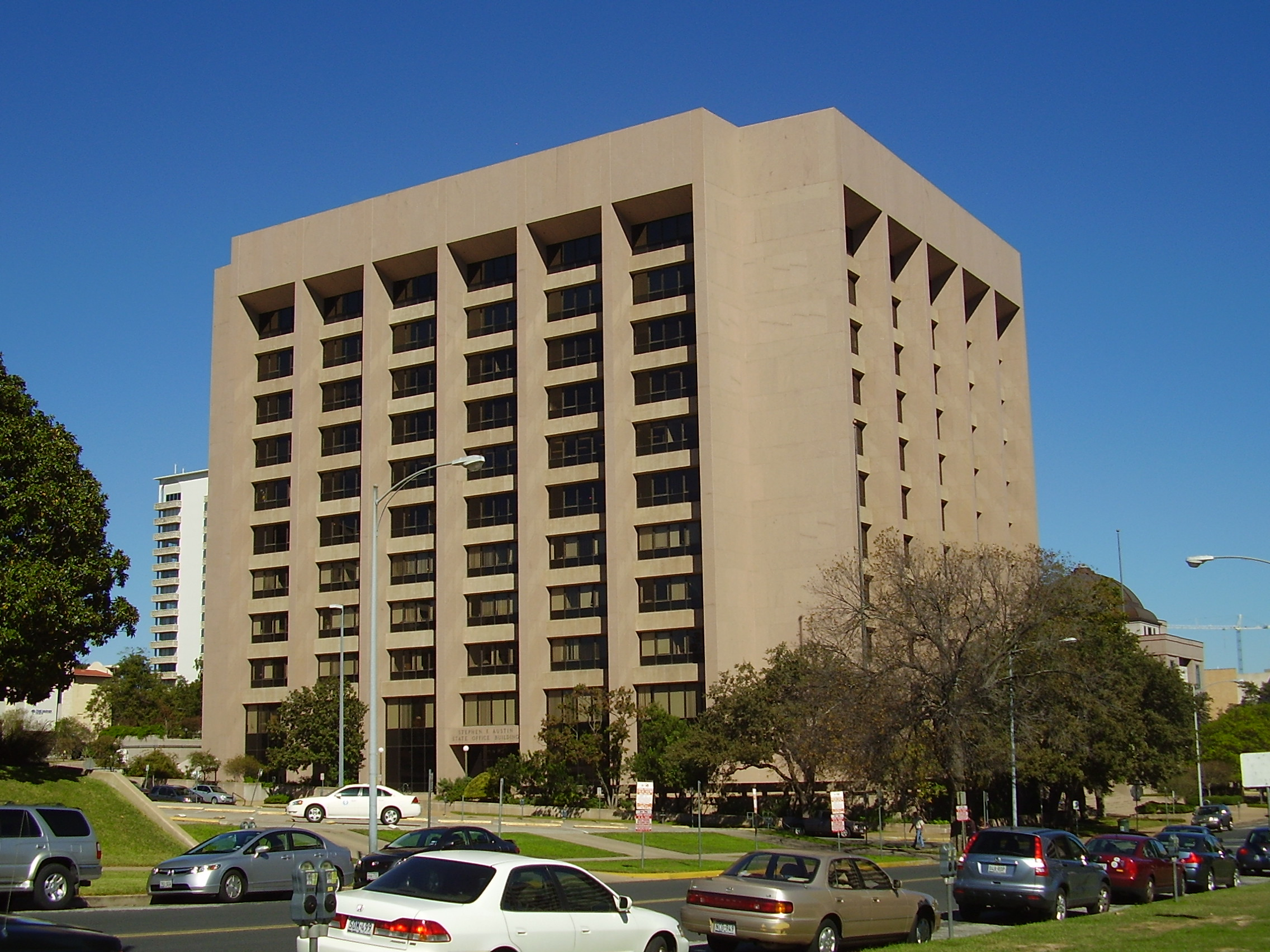
- Stephen F. Austin State Office Building

Agency overview
- Formed: 22 December 1836; 189 years ago
- Jurisdiction: Texas public lands
- Headquarters: Stephen F. Austin State Office Building 1700 N. Congress Ave Austin, Texas 78701; 30°16′46″N 97°44′22″W
- Agency executive: Dawn Buckingham, Land Commissioner
- Website: glo.texas.gov

The Texas General Land Office (GLO) is a state agency of the U.S. state of Texas, responsible for managing lands and mineral rights properties that are owned by the state. The GLO also manages and contributes to the state's Permanent School Fund. The agency is headquartered in the Stephen F. Austin State Office Building in Downtown Austin.

== Role and remit ==
The General Land Office's main role is to manage Texas's publicly owned lands, by negotiating and enforcing leases for the use of the land, and sometimes by making sales of public lands. Royalties and proceeds from land sales are added to the state's Permanent School Fund, which helps to fund public education within the state. The agency is also responsible for keeping records of land grants and titles and for issuing maps and surveys of public lands. The agency also manages federal disaster recovery grant funding.

Since 2011 the GLO has managed The Alamo in San Antonio. The management of The Alamo was transferred to the General Land Office after allegations of mismanagement were directed at the prior manager, the Daughters of the Republic of Texas.

== History ==
The Congress of the Republic of Texas established the General Land Office on 22 December 1836 (making the GLO the oldest existing Texas public agency). The agency's constitutional purpose was to "superintend, execute, and perform all acts touching or respecting the public lands of Texas." Since its establishment the agency has been located in Austin, although a relocation to Houston was briefly attempted during the Texas Archive War. One former home of the GLO, the Old Land Office Building, is a registered historic place and now serves as the Texas State Capitol Visitor Center.

When the State of Texas was annexed into the United States in 1845, it kept control of all of its public lands from its time as a sovereign state. As a result, Texas is the only public land state in the US to control all of its own public lands; all federal lands in Texas were acquired by purchase (e.g. military bases), donation (e.g. national parks) or eminent domain.

Texas's public lands were significantly enlarged by the US Submerged Lands Act of 1953 and the resolution of the ensuing Tidelands Controversy. Because Texas's historical territorial waters originated with the Republic, the US Supreme Court ruled in the 1960 case United States v. Louisiana that Texas was in the unique position of owning territory out to three leagues (9 geographical miles which is nearly exactly 9 nautical miles, 10.35 statute miles, 16.66 km) from its coastline (significantly more than the three geographical miles controlled by other coastal states). All of these lands (and the oil and gas deposits beneath them) are managed by the General Land Office.

== Texas Land Commissioner ==
Commissioner of the Texas General Land Office
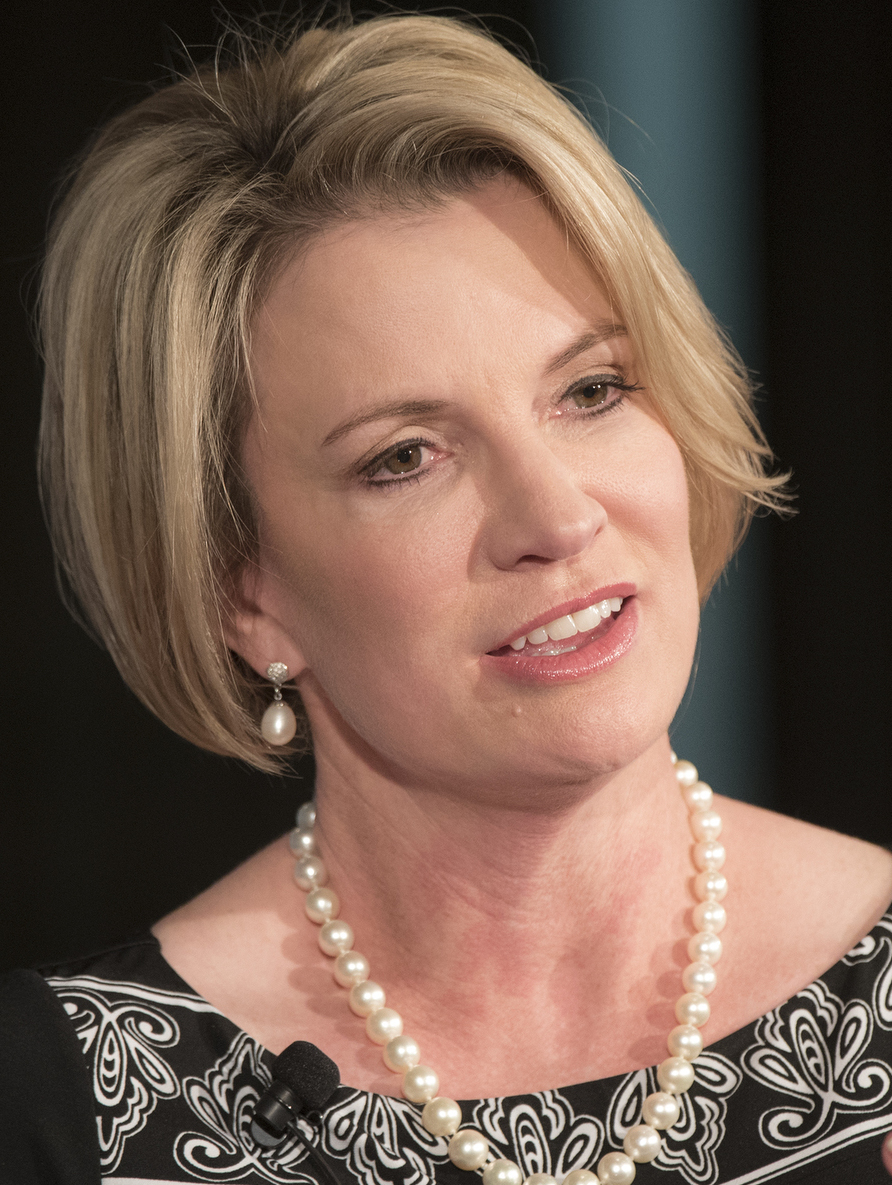
- Incumbent; Dawn Buckingham since January 10, 2023
- Style: The Honorable
- Term length: Four years, no term limits
- Formation: Texas Constitution
- Website: Official Website

The head of the General Land Office is the Texas Land Commissioner, a statewide public official. Since a 1972 constitutional amendment, Texas state-wide officers–including the Commissioner–have been elected every four years, prior to which they were elected every two years. The current land commissioner is Dawn Buckingham, who was elected on 8 November 2022.

Land Commissioners by party affiliation (since statehood)
Party	Land Commissioner
Democratic	20
Republican	6

Land Commissioners in chronological order, showing party affiliation
No.	Image	Name	Term of service	Political party
1		John P. Borden	August 23, 1837 – December 12, 1840	
2 (interim) (Note: Sources differ in whether they include Raglin in the count of Commissioners, and hence whether they consider Ward to be second or third commissioner; however, the General Land Office's official enumeration includes Raglin in its count)		H. W. Raglin	December 12, 1840 – January 4, 1841	
3		Thomas W. Ward	January 4, 1841 – March 20, 1848	
The Republic of Texas is admitted into the United States as the State of Texas (December 29, 1845)
4		George W. Smyth	March 20, 1848 – August 4, 1851; Defeated Ward in 1848 election	Democratic
5 (Note: Crosby served three non-consecutive terms as Land Commissioner, but is only counted in the enumeration once)		Stephen Crosby	August 4, 1851 – March 1, 1858	Democratic
6 (Note: White served two non-consecutive terms as Land Commissioner, but is only counted in the enumeration once)		Francis M. White	March 1, 1858 – March 1, 1862	Democratic
5		Stephen Crosby	March 1, 1862 – September 1, 1865	Democratic
6		Francis M. White	September 1, 1865 – August 7, 1866	Democratic
5		Stephen Crosby	August 7, 1866 – August 27, 1867; Removed from office by Reconstruction military government	Democratic
7		Joseph Spence	August 27, 1867 – January 19, 1870	Republican
8		Jacob Kuechler	January 19, 1870 – January 20, 1874	Republican
9		Johann J. Groos	January 20, 1874 – June 15, 1878; Died in office	Democratic
10		W. C. Walsh	June 15, 1878 – January 10, 1887; Appointed by Governor Richard B. Hubbard to remainder of Groos' term	Democratic
11		Richard M. Hall	January 10, 1887 – January 16, 1891	Democratic
12		W. L. McGaughey	January 16, 1891 – January 16, 1895	Democratic
13		Andrew J. Baker	January 15, 1895 – January 16, 1899	Democratic
14		George W. Finger	January 16, 1899 – May 4, 1899; Died in office	Democratic
15		Charles Rogan	May 15, 1899 – January 10, 1903; Appointed by Governor Joseph Sayers to replace Finger; subsequently elected	Democratic
16		John J. Terrell	January 10, 1903 – January 11, 1909	Democratic
17		James T. Robison	January 11, 1909 – September 8, 1929; Died in office	Democratic
18		J. H. Walker	September 12, 1929 – January 1, 1937; Appointed by Governor Dan Moody to replace Robison; elected in 1930; re-elected in 1932 and 1934; did not stand in 1936	Democratic
19		William H. McDonald	January 1, 1937 – January 1, 1939	Democratic
20		Bascom Giles	January 1, 1939 – January 5, 1955; Re-elected in 1954 but failed to take oath of office due to Veterans' Land Board scandal, for which he went on to serve 3 years in prison	Democratic
21		James Earl Rudder	January 5, 1955 – February 1, 1958; Appointed by Governor Alan Shivers to replace Giles; elected in 1956; resigned in 1958	Democratic
22		Bill Allcorn	February 1, 1958 – January 1, 1961; Appointed by Governor Price Daniel to replace Rudder; elected in 1958	Democratic
23		Jerry Sadler	January 1, 1961 – January 1, 1971	Democratic
24		Bob Armstrong	January 12, 1971 – January 4, 1983	Democratic
25		Garry Mauro	January 1, 1983 – January 5, 1999	Democratic
26		David Dewhurst	January 19, 1999 – January 21, 2003	Republican
27		Jerry E. Patterson	January 21, 2003 – January 2, 2015	Republican
28		George P. Bush	January 2, 2015 – January 10, 2023	Republican
29		Dawn Buckingham	January 10, 2023 – present	Republican

== See also ==
- Permanent School Fund
