= Public land state =

Categorisation of U.S. states

In the United States, a public land state is a U.S. state in which all lands were originally public lands owned by the United States federal government, which later transferred them to private ownership – or to the ownership of state or local governments – through land grants. By contrast, a private land state (also called a non-public land state or a state land state) is a U.S. state in which the federal government is not the original land-owner. In public land states, the federal government owns a significant proportion of the state's public lands; in private land states, federal land holdings are generally more limited, comprising lands acquired through purchase, donation or eminent domain for such purposes as military bases, federal office buildings, national parks, etc, and public lands are more frequently under the ownership of state or local governments.

Public land states are those created from the Northwest Territory ceded to the U.S. from Great Britain after the Revolutionary War; the Louisiana Purchase; western territories acquired from Mexico after the end of the Mexican War; and Alaska, acquired from Russia in the Alaska Purchase.

Private land states include the original 13 states that achieved independence after the American Revolution, as well as the states of Vermont and Texas (which were both sovereign republics at the time of their admission to the Union), Kentucky and Tennessee (both ceded from lands claimed by the original states of Virginia and North Carolina, respectively), Maine and West Virginia (carved directly from the original states of Massachusetts and Virginia), and Hawaii. The Federal Government did not issue land grants in those locations, and hence the National Archives (which holds the records of the United States General Land Office) does not hold any land grant records for them. Land grant records for private land states are generally found in state government archives. Although classified as a private land state by the federal government, some sources however refer to Texas as a "public land state", on the grounds that a significant proportion of state lands are owned by the state government; these lands were originally Mexican public lands, ownership of which was claimed by the Republic of Texas upon its independence from Mexico.

The Bureau of Land Management divides public land states into two groups, Eastern and Western, whose records are maintained separately. The Eastern public land states are defined as Alabama, Arkansas, Florida, Illinois, Indiana, Iowa, Louisiana, Michigan, Minnesota, Mississippi, Missouri, Ohio, and Wisconsin, while the Western public land states are Alaska, Arizona, California, Colorado, Idaho, Kansas, Montana, Nebraska, Nevada, New Mexico, North Dakota, Oklahoma, Oregon, South Dakota, Utah, Washington, and Wyoming.
