= Baslieux-lès-Fismes =

- Commune
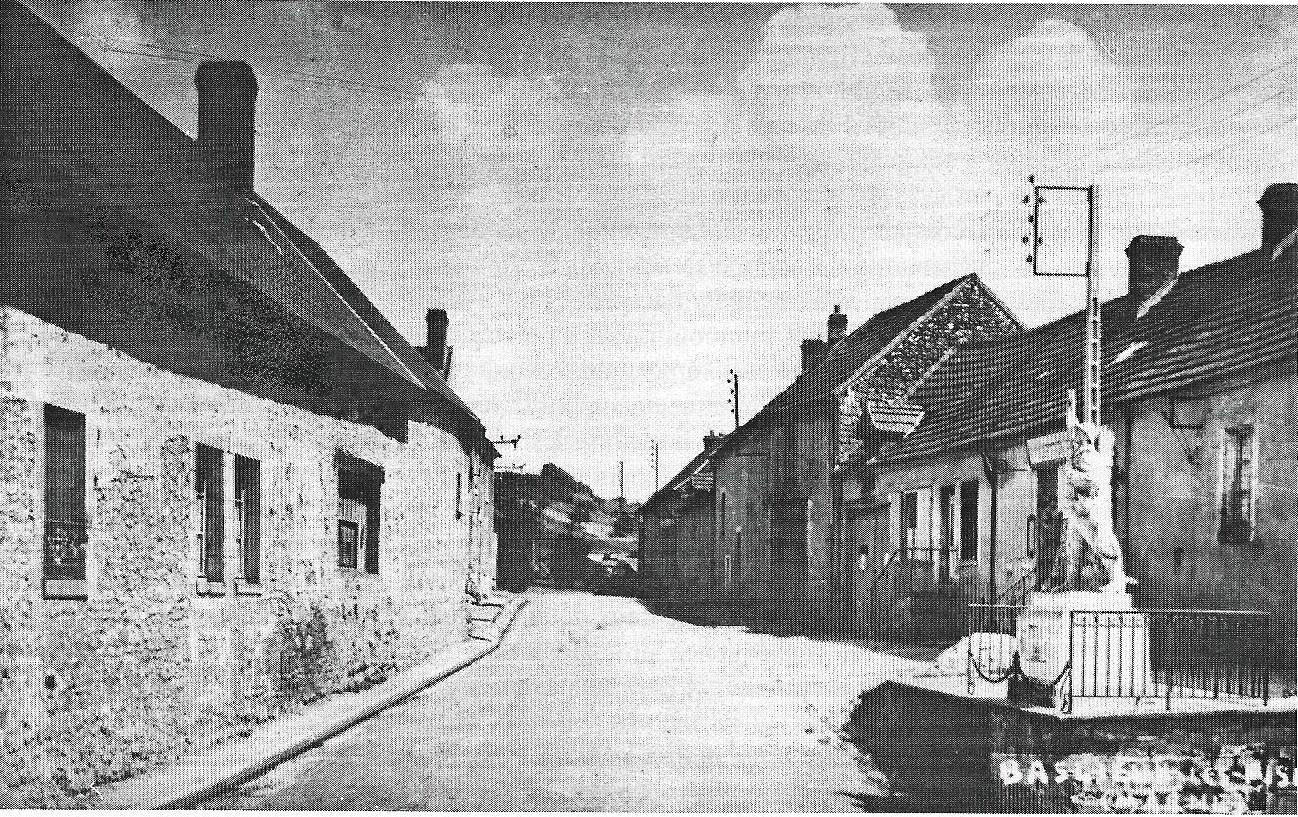
- The war memorial in Baslieux-lès-Fismes
- Location of Baslieux-lès-Fismes
- Location within France Location within Grand Est
- Coordinates: 49°19′32″N 3°42′52″E
- Country: France
- Region: Grand Est
- Department: Marne
- Arrondissement: Reims
- Canton: Fismes-Montagne de Reims
- Intercommunality: CU Grand Reims

Government
  - Mayor (2020–2026): Lucie Pollet
- Area^{1}: 5.62 km^{2} (2.17 sq mi)
- Elevation: 80 m (260 ft)
- Population (2023): 339
  - Density: 60.3/km^{2} (156/sq mi)
- Time zone: UTC+01:00 (CET)
  - Summer (DST): UTC+02:00 (CEST)
- INSEE/Postal code: 51037 /51170
- ^{1} French Land Register data, which excludes lakes, ponds, glaciers > 1 km^{2} (0.386 sq mi or 247 acres) and river estuaries.

Baslieux-lès-Fismes (French pronunciation: [baljø lɛ fim], lit. 'Baslieux near Fismes') is a commune in the Marne department in northeastern France.

== Population ==
Historical population
Year	Pop.	±% p.a.
1968	181	—
1975	144	−3.21%
1982	129	−1.56%
1990	162	+2.89%
1999	188	+1.67%
2007	281	+5.15%
2012	299	+1.25%
2017	327	+1.81%
2023	339	+0.60%
Source: INSEE

== See also ==
- Communes of the Marne department
