= 1894 Texas gubernatorial election =

- November 6, 1894
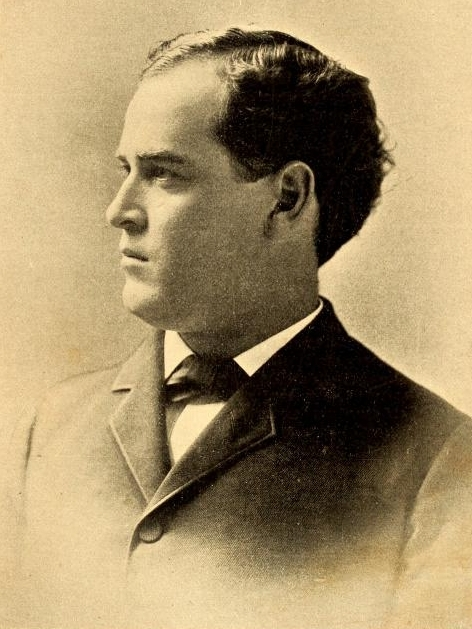

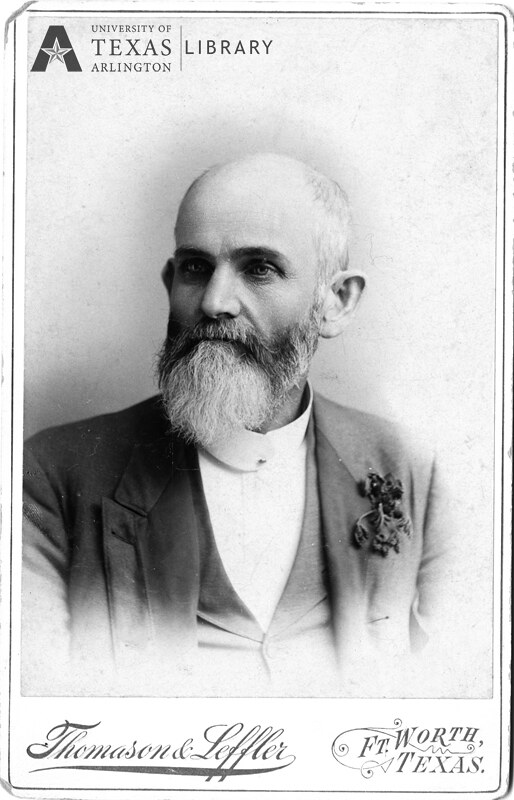

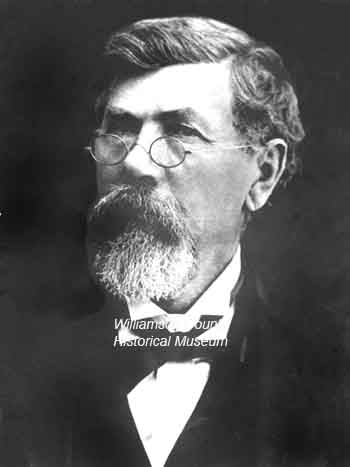
Candidate	Charles Culberson	Thomas L. Nugent	William K. Makemson
Party	Democratic	Populist	Republican
Popular vote	207,167	152,731	54,520
Percentage	49.01%	36.13%	12.90%
- County results Culberson: 30–40% 40–50% 50–60% 60–70% 70–80% 80–90% 90–100% Nugent: 30–40% 40–50% 50–60% 60–70% 70–80% Makemson: 20–30% 30–40% 40–50% 50–60% 60–70% Schmitz: 40–50% 50–60% Scattering / Write-in: 30–40% No Results
Governor before election
Jim Hogg
Democratic
Governor-elect
Charles Culberson
Democratic

The 1894 Texas gubernatorial election was held to elect the Governor of Texas. Attorney General Charles Culberson was elected Governor with a plurality of the vote over Populist candidate Thomas Nugent.

== General election ==
At the time, Texas was a part of the "Solid South" and the Democratic party was heavily favored in state and local elections. However the administration of Jim Hogg and the election of 1892, had left a serious split in the party over how progressive they should be. A "Harmony Meeting" was held in order to unify the organization and prevent an upset by any of the opposition parties. After a contested convention which featured four major candidates for governor, Texas Attorney General Charles Culberson was selected as the nominee.

The state Republican party, which had split in the previous election into two rival factions over race, remained divided. The "Reform" faction, commonly known as the "Lily White" faction over their opposition to African-American membership in the party and the leadership of chairman Norris Wright Cuney, held their own convention in which they nominated John B. Schmitz as their gubernatorial nominee. The "Regular" Republicans supported a slate of candidates headed by William K. Makemson.

Though the 1892 election had been dominated by a Democratic party split, the Populists managed to secure some wins in the state legislature. Bolstered by these successes the party decided to renominate the top of their slate from the 1892 ticket and Thomas Nugent was again the gubernatorial nominee.

=== Candidates ===
- Charles Culberson, Attorney General of Texas, former attorney of Marion County (Democratic)
- John Hughes Cochran, Speaker of the Texas House of Representatives, former postmaster of Dallas, former tax collector, former Texas Ranger, member of the 6th Texas Cavalry (Democrat) (withdrawn)
- J.M. Dunn (Prohibition)
- S. W. T. Lanham, lawyer, former congressman, private in the CSA's 3rd South Carolina Regiment (Democrat) (withdrawn)
- William K. Makemson, writer, historian, and candidate for Lieutenant Governor in 1892 (Republican)
- John H. McCall (Democrat) (withdrawn)
- Thomas Lewis Nugent, nominee for governor in 1892, former judge of the 29th District Court, nonpartisan candidate for the Texas Supreme Court in 1888, lawyer, former teacher (Populist)
- John H. Reagan, Railroad Commissioner, former U.S. Senator, former congressman, Secretary of the Treasury and Postmaster General of the Confederate States (Democrat) (withdrawn)
- John B. Schmitz, undertaker and Republican nominee for Treasurer in 1890 (Lily White Republican)

=== Results ===
1894 Texas gubernatorial election
Party	Candidate	Votes	%	±%
Democratic	Charles Culberson	207,167	49.01%	▲5.27
Populist	Thomas L. Nugent	152,731	36.13%	▲11.2
Republican	William K. Makemson	54,520	12.90%	▲12.6
Independent Republican	John B. Schmitz	5,026	1.19%	N/A
Prohibition	J. M. Dunn	2,196	0.52%	▲0.15
Write-in		1,076	0.25%	▲0.21
Total votes		422,716	100.00%	
