= Attorney General Hogg =

Attorney General Hogg may refer to:

- David P. Hogue (1815–1871), Attorney General of Florida
- Douglas Hogg, 1st Viscount Hailsham (1872–1950), Attorney General for England and Wales
- Jim Hogg (1851–1906), Attorney General of Texas

== See also ==
- General Hogg (disambiguation)
