= General Hogg =

General Hogg may refer to:

- David R. Hogg (born 1958), U.S. Army lieutenant general
- Dorothy A. Hogg (fl. 1990s–2020s), U.S. Air Force lieutenant general
- Joseph L. Hogg (1806–1862), Confederate States Army brigadier general
- Rudolph Trower Hogg (1877–1955), British Indian Army brigadier general

== See also ==
- William M. Hoge (1894–1979), U.S. Army general
- Attorney General Hogg (disambiguation)
