= Hogg Building =

Historic building in Houston, Texas, U.S.

- U.S. National Register of Historic Places
- Recorded Texas Historic Landmark
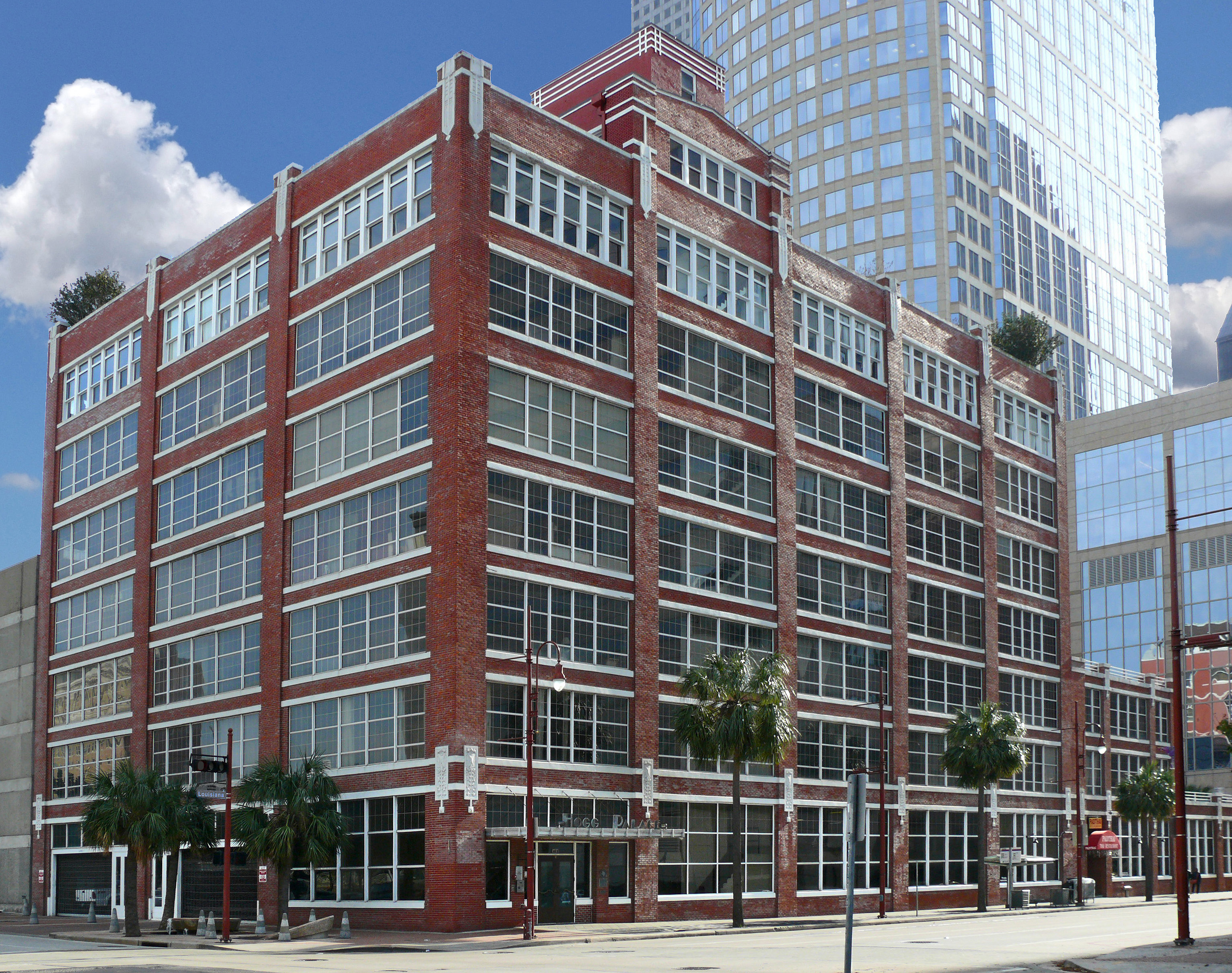
- The building's exterior in 2011

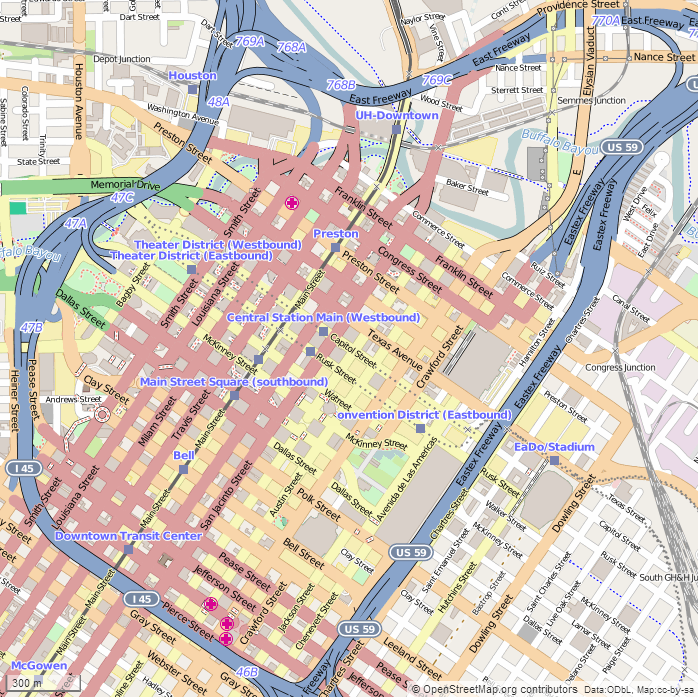
- Location within Houston Downtown Location within Texas Location within the United States
- Location: 401 Louisiana Street, Houston, Texas
- Coordinates: 29°45′45″N 95°21′50″W
- Area: less than one acre
- Built: 1921
- Architect: Barglebaugh & Whitson
- Architectural style: Late 19th and 20th Century Revivals, Mediterranean Revival
- NRHP reference No.: 78002943
- RTHL No.: 10684

Significant dates
- Added to NRHP: July 14, 1978
- Designated RTHL: 1981

The Hogg Building, also known as the Hogg Palace, is a building complex located on the 400 block of Louisiana in Downtown Houston, Texas, and is listed on the National Register of Historic Places. Originally the Armor Building, it was developed by Will Hogg and initially leased as a car show room with office spaces on the upper floors, with the exception of the penthouse, which was the home and office of Hogg. Opened in 1921, the complex was acquired in 1954 by the Pappas Company, which commissioned a cosmetic renovation in 1963. Randall Davis acquired and renovated the main building and opened it in 1995 as the Hogg Palace.

== History ==
The Hogg Building was known as the Armor Building during the design process and the Great Southern Building when it opened in March 1921. Charles Erwin Barglebaugh and Lloyd R. Whitson of El Paso designed the eight-story, Sullivan-inspired building. The ground floor was used as a showroom for automobiles, while the other stories were dedicated to office space. It was constructed of concrete with reinforced steel, thus eliminating the need for a large number of piers. The building is also characterized by a great number of windows, covering much of the outer facing. Ornamentation marks the tops of the seventh and first floors.

Will Hogg, the eldest son of former Texas Governor Jim Hogg, used the eighth-floor penthouse to manage Hogg Brothers Company and the family's philanthropic projects. In the 1920s, Hogg's workspace was, "surrounded by a roof garden lavishly abloom with shrubs and flowers, in a suite of elegantly furnished rooms that included an oval dining room, a kitchen, a living room, and a guest bedroom as well as offices." He decorated the penthouse with his collection of artwork by Frederic Remington. The Hogg family used the penthouse as a business office until 1941.

Pappas Company acquired the complex in 1954. Less than ten years later, a renovation by Paul & Paul included substraction of the old marquis and a slipcover made of enamel and cement. Harvin Moore-Barry Moore Architects removed the paneling and restored the facade in 1978. In the early 1990s, developer Randall Davis converted the retail and office building into seventy-nine loft apartments. Davis opened the refurbished building as the Hogg Palace Lofts in the fall of 1995, and it was already fully leased by the end of that year.

As of 1996, the Hogg Building, also known as the Pappas Building, was a three-building complex located on five lots of Block 42 from the original Borden Survey of Houston. All facing the Louisiana Street side of the block between Preston and Prairie avenues, from south to north, there are a single-story parking garage, a three-story building, and the eighth-story Hogg Palace, including a roof-top penthouse, originally occupied by Will Hogg.

== See also ==
- National Register of Historic Places listings in Harris County, Texas

== Bibliography ==
- Bernhard, Virginia (1996). Ima Hogg: The Governor's Daughter (Second ed.). New York: Brandywine Press. ISBN 1-881-089-91-6.
- Bradley, Barrie Scardino (2020). Improbable Metropolis: Houston's Architectural and Urban History. Austin: University of Texas Press. ISBN 978-1-4773-2019-8.
- Fox, Stephen (2012). AIA Houston Architectural Guide (Third ed.). Houston: American Institute of Architects, Houston Chapter. ISBN 978-0-615-66959-5.
- Henry, Jay C. (1993). Architecture in Texas, 1895−1945. Austin: University of Texas Press. ISBN 978-0292722804.
- Kirkland, Kate Sayen (2009). The Hogg Family and Houston: Philanthropy and the Civic Ideal. Austin: University of Texas Press. ISBN 9780292718661.
