= Varner–Hogg Plantation State Historic Site =

- Varner-Hogg Plantation
- U.S. National Register of Historic Places
- Texas State Historic Site
- Texas State Antiquities Landmark
- Recorded Texas Historic Landmark
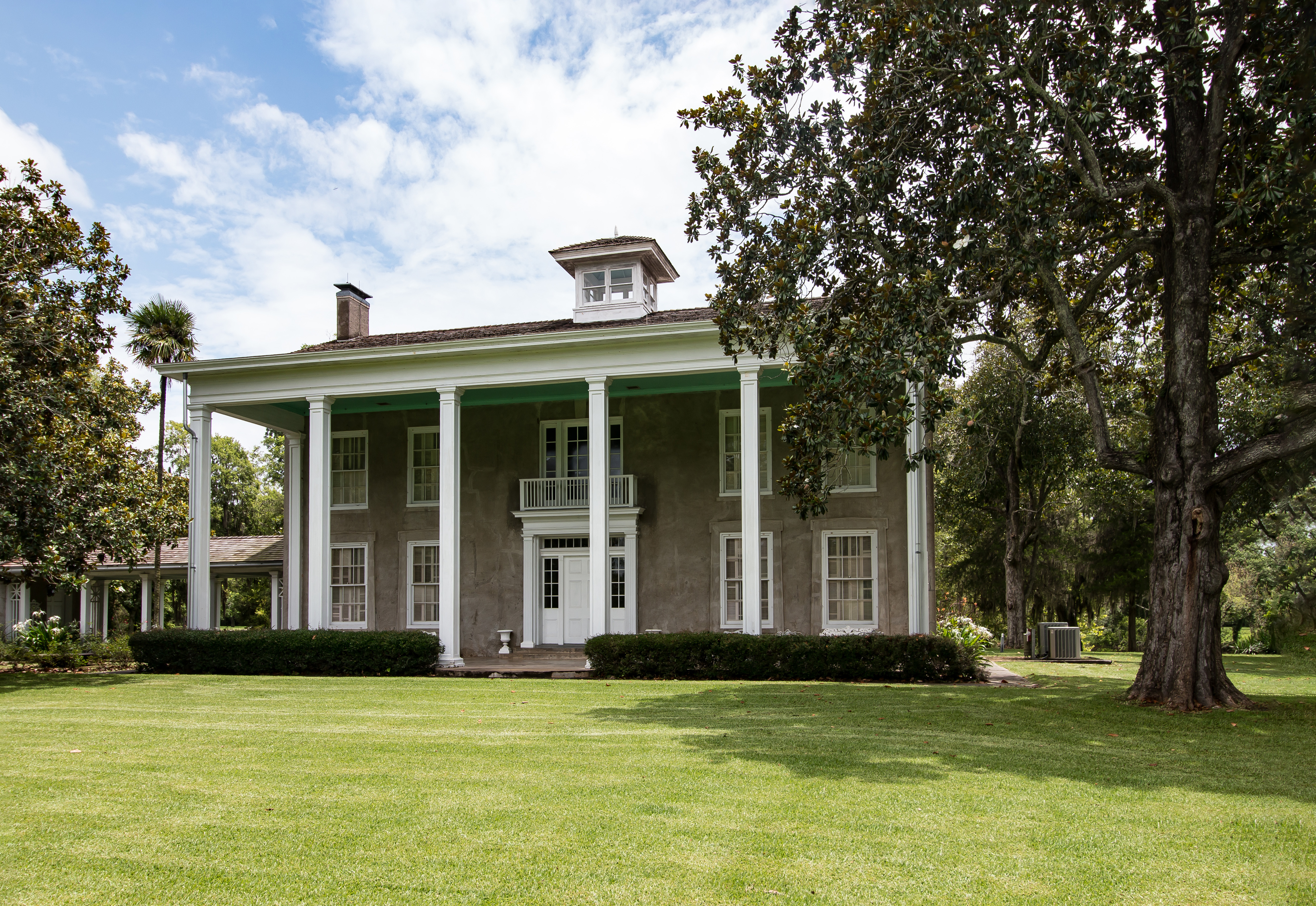
- Originally the rear of the house, Ima Hogg converted this to be the front entrance of Varner-Hogg in the 1920s

- Location within Texas Location within the United States
- Interactive map showing the location of Varner-Hogg Plantation
- Nearest city: West Columbia, Texas
- Coordinates: 29°9′47″N 95°38′25″W
- Area: 65.7 acres (26.6 ha)
- Built: 1824
- Architectural style: Greek Revival
- Website: Varner-Hogg Plantation State Historic Site
- NRHP reference No.: 80004082
- TSAL No.: 8200000121
- RTHL No.: 9603

Significant dates
- Added to NRHP: April 9, 1980
- Designated TSHS: 1958
- Designated TSAL: January 1, 1983
- Designated RTHL: 1964

The Varner–Hogg Plantation State Historic Site is a historical site operated by the Texas Historical Commission. The site was the home of former Governor of Texas James S. Hogg and his family. The site is located outside West Columbia, in Brazoria County.

== History ==
The property was originally the home of Martin Varner, one of the Old Three Hundred and a veteran of the Texas Revolution. His was the nineteenth land grant offered in Stephen F. Austin's colony and consisted of over 4,600 acres (1,900 ha). Varner built the property's first house, a log cabin, in 1824. Varner raised corn, cattle and sugar cane on the land, and enslaved at least two people there. Varner may have distilled rum from the sugar cane.

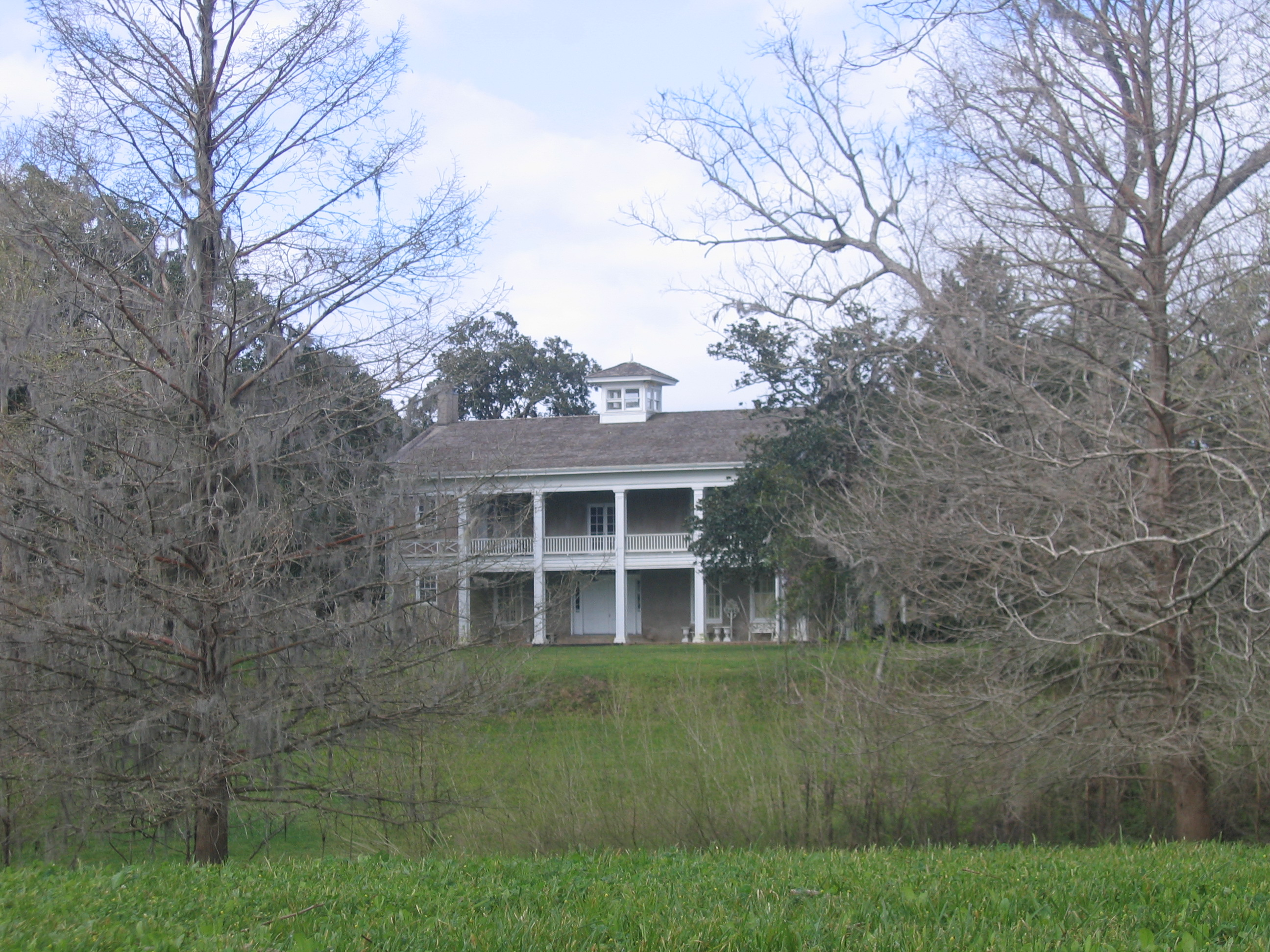
Columbus Patton built the plantation house to face Varner Creek. This is now the rear entrance to the house.

In 1834, Varner sold his holdings to Columbus R. Patton, representing his father, John D. Patton. The plantation was known as the Patton Plantation through the rest of the 19th century. The Pattons built what is now the main house on the same site as Varner's cabin. The Patton family developed the property into a sugar plantation. Columbus Patton brought enslaved people with him from Kentucky, and in 1833, sixty-six people were enslaved on the 13,500 acres of land.

Several members of the Patton family were active in the Texas Revolution, and one, William H. Patton, was aide-de-camp to Sam Houston. William was part of the group that guarded Antonio López de Santa Anna after his capture at the Battle of San Jacinto. Santa Anna was briefly held at the Patton Plantation.

Columbus Patton was declared insane in 1854, at which time his property was placed under the control of Brazoria County farmer and merchant John Adriance. Upon Patton's death in 1856, the estate was placed into probate, since Patton had died intestate. Soon after Patton's death, Adriance found Patton's 1853 will. Patton's will not only left a bulk of his estate to his nieces but also stipulated that four of the enslaved people not be hired out, be allowed to choose their residence among Patton's heirs, and receive $100 per year until their death. One of the people mentioned in his will was his enslaved mistress, Rachel. However, although his will was found, Patton's nieces and nephews disputed it in court. Eventually, when a partial agreement was reached in 1857, Rachel was given her financial support and freedom to move among Patton family-owned properties. Patton's family gave a portion of the land to Adriance but eventually regained control of the property. They sold it by 1869.

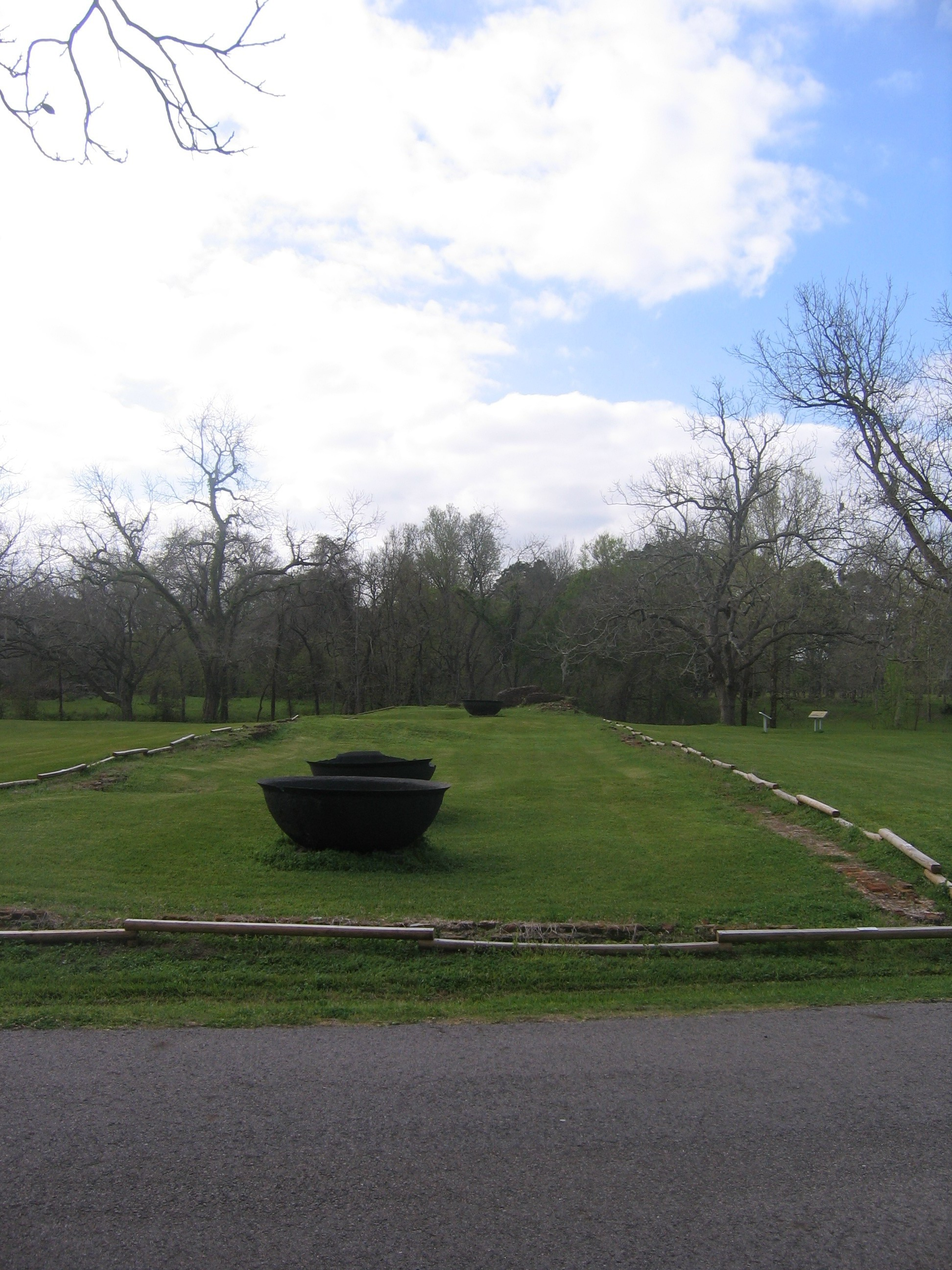
The Galveston Hurricane of 1900 left only a small piece of the plantation's sugar mill standing. One can still see the brick outline of the foundation of the building, as well as 3 of the cauldrons used in the sugar extraction process.

The property was run through a convict lease system through the Texas prison system until the Galveston Hurricane of 1900 knocked down most of the buildings but left the farmhouse intact.

Former Governor Jim Hogg bought the property in 1902. Although the family used it as a second home, Hogg intended to use it as an investment. He was convinced that there was a great deal of oil on the grounds and began drilling soon after the purchase, but he died in 1906, 14 years before oil was found. The 1920 oil strike proved to be the cornerstone of his children's wealth.

The family leased the property for livestock grazing and farming. The Governor's daughter, Ima Hogg, refurbished the house, and in 1958, she donated it to the state to commemorate her father and the heroes of Texas and America. During her renovations, Ima Hogg chose to assign each room of the house to a period of Texas history.

== Geography and description ==
The site is located on Farm to Market Road 2852 off State Highway 35, two miles north of West Columbia. The site is near 66 acres (27 ha) in size. Varner Creek runs through the property.

An 1835-era farmhouse, refurbished by Miss Ima, is located on the site. The house and other buildings represent antebellum Texas plantation life. The National Register of Historic Places listed the property on April 9, 1980.

== See also ==
- List of Texas State Historic Sites
- National Register of Historic Places listings in Brazoria County, Texas
- Recorded Texas Historic Landmarks in Brazoria County
- The Hogg Family and Houston
