= Joseph L. Hogg =

American politician (1806 - 1862)

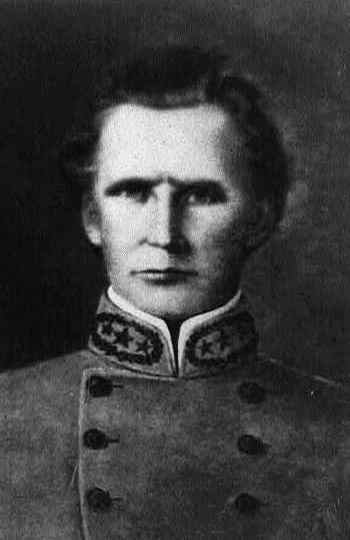
- Born: Joseph Lewis Hogg; September 13, 1806; Morgan County, Georgia
- Died: May 16, 1862 (aged 55); Corinth, Mississippi
- Burial place: Corinth, Mississippi
- Military career
- Allegiance: Confederate States of America
- Branch: United States Army; Confederate States Army
- Service years: 1846–1847 (USA); 1861–1862 (CSA)
- Rank: Private, USV; Brigadier General, CSA
- Units: 2nd Texas Mounted Volunteers; 3rd Texas Cavalry Regiment
- Commands: 1st Bde, 2nd Div, Army of the West
- Conflicts: Mexican–American War; American Civil War

Joseph Lewis Hogg (September 13, 1806 – May 16, 1862) was a politician and a Confederate States Army general from Texas during the American Civil War. He was the father of Texas Governor Jim Hogg.

Hogg was born in Morgan County, Georgia, and moved with his family to Alabama in 1818. He studied law, and became an officer in the militia before moving to Texas in 1839, where he established a law practice. He was elected to the Texas Congress and served from 1843 to 1844. He supported annexation by the United States, and was elected to the Texas Senate in 1846. At the outbreak of the Mexican–American War however, he resigned his seat and enlisted in the Texas Mounted Volunteers, fighting in the Battle of Monterrey. He was chosen as a delegate at the Texas State Convention in 1860, and cast his vote to secede from the Union.

After secession, he became a captain in the 3rd Texas Cavalry, a unit he helped organize, with his older son Thomas Elisha Hogg serving in the company as well. Shortly afterwards Captain Hogg was appointed colonel by Texas Governor Edward Clark. On February 12, 1862, he was appointed brigadier general, confirmed a day later, and served in the Army of the West. In April he was given command of a brigade to reinforce Confederate troops at the Siege of Corinth. His brigade consisted of the 10th, 11th and 14th Texas Cavalry regiments (dismounted) as well as Andrews' Texas Infantry, McRay's Arkansas Infantry and Goode's Texas Battery. During the siege, he contracted dysentery and died on May 16, 1862. He was buried in Corinth, Mississippi.

== See also ==
- List of American Civil War generals (Confederate)
