= Martin Varner =

American settler

Martin Varner (March 3, 1785 – February 14, 1844) was one of the original American settlers in Mexican Texas, known as the Old Three Hundred, and was a veteran of the Texas Revolution.

== Early life ==
Born in German Township, Fayette County, Pennsylvania, he moved with his family to Warren County, Ohio in 1791.

In 1815, Varner moved to Arkansas Territory and joined with a group of like-minded individuals who moved on to the land south of the Red River. They established the town of Jonesborough in what is now Red River County, Texas. Varner married Elizabeth Inglish (English) at Jonesborough on September 26, 1818.

== Texas ==
In 1821, many of the Spanish colonies in the Americas gained independence. Among the new countries created as a result of the revolutions was Mexico.

Varner heard of Stephen F. Austin's colony on the Brazos River, and he went to see him, signing with the Old Three Hundred. Varner settled in Independence temporarily.

In 1824, Varner was given Mexican land grants in Brazoria and Waller counties. His Brazoria County property was located outside of what is now West Columbia, at what is now known as the Varner–Hogg Plantation State Historical Site. Varner raised sugar cane on the property, and built a rum distillery there. In 1834, Varner sold the property to Columbus Patton.

Varner participated in the Battle of Velasco in 1832. He later served in the Army of the Republic of Texas from April through July, 1836. He was awarded 320 acres (1.3 km^{2}) of land in Wood County for his service, but he and his family were forced to abandon their land during the Runaway Scrape. For his service during the Battle of San Jacinto, he received a further 640 acres (2.6 km^{2}) in Wood County. He later joined his family in Lamar County, where he bought 1,700 acres (6.9 km^{2}) near Fort Lyday. He later moved back to Wood County, where he and his family became the first permanent settlers. He used the money from the sale of his plantation in Brazoria County to buy up the lands of other San Jacinto veterans.

== Death ==
During a land dispute with a neighbor, Varner was shot in the back and his son, Stephen F., was shot and killed by a Mexican named Gonzales. Martin Varner died three days later. A marker has been placed on the Wood County property by the Texas Historical Commission.
