= Charles A. Culberson =

Governor of Texas from 1895 to 1899

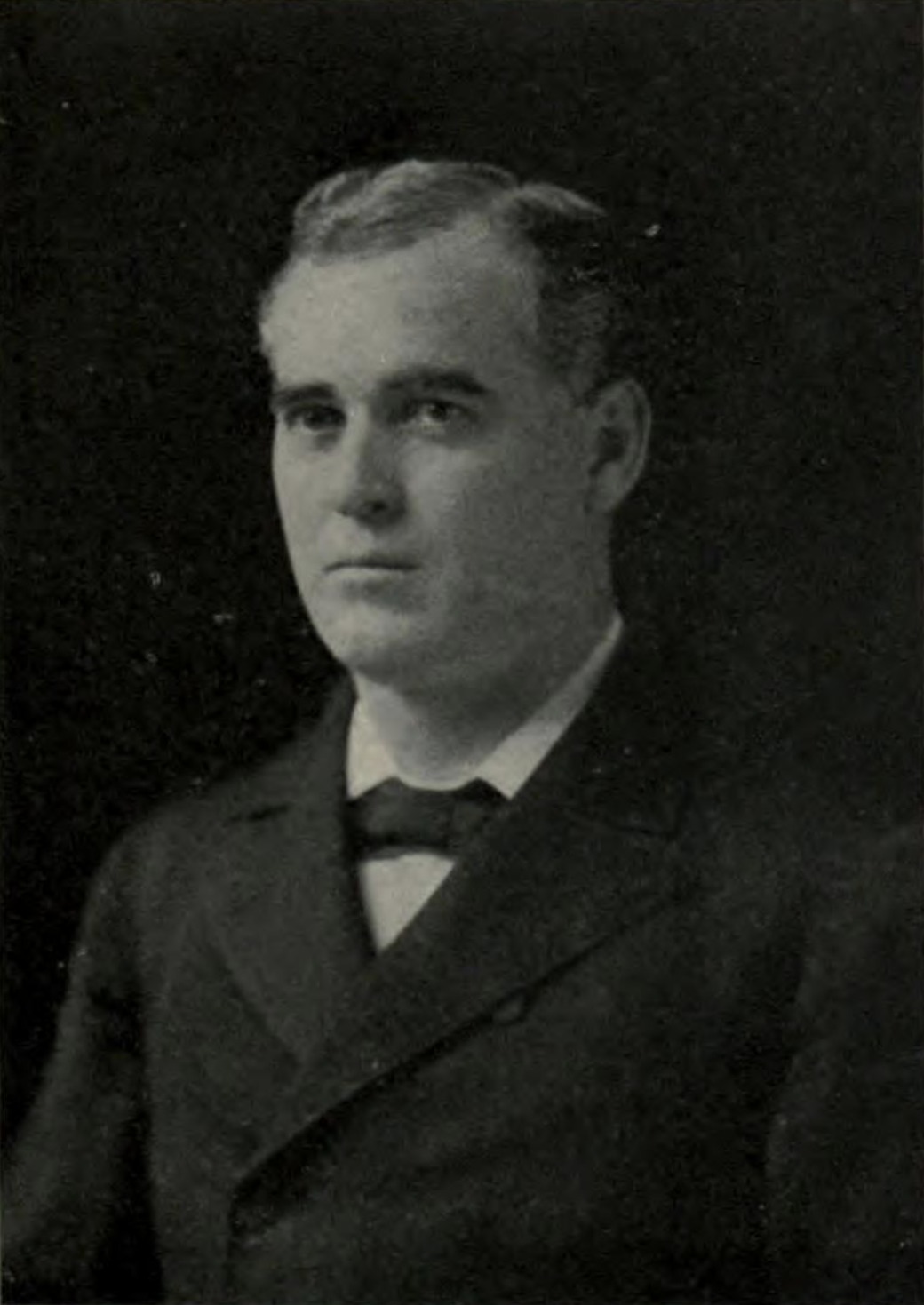
- Culberson in 1904 publication

Chairman of the Senate Democratic Caucus
- In office December 1907 – December 1909
- Preceded by: Joseph Clay Stiles Blackburn
- Succeeded by: Hernando Money

United States Senator from Texas
- In office March 4, 1899 – March 3, 1923
- Preceded by: Roger Q. Mills
- Succeeded by: Earle B. Mayfield

21st Governor of Texas
- In office January 15, 1895 – January 17, 1899
- Lieutenant: George Taylor Jester
- Preceded by: Jim Hogg
- Succeeded by: Joseph D. Sayers

Attorney General of Texas
- In office January 20, 1891 – January 15, 1895
- Governor: Jim Hogg
- Preceded by: Jim Hogg
- Succeeded by: Martin McNulty Crane

Personal details
- Born: Charles Allen Culberson; June 10, 1855 Dadeville, Alabama, U.S.
- Died: March 19, 1925 (aged 69) Washington, D.C., U.S.
- Resting place: East Oakwood Cemetery; Fort Worth, Texas, U.S.
- Party: Democratic
- Spouse: Sally Harrison (m. 1882)
- Children: 1
- Education: Virginia Military Institute (BS); University of Virginia, Charlottesville

Charles Allen Culberson (June 10, 1855 – March 19, 1925) was an American political figure and Democrat who served as the 21st governor of Texas from 1895 to 1899, and as a United States senator from Texas from 1899 to 1923.

According to one study, Culberson belonged (like Jim Hogg, his predecessor as governor) “to a stream of Texas liberal populism.”

== Early life and education ==
Charles Allen Culberson was born on June 10, 1855, in Dadeville, Alabama, to Eugenia (née Kimbal) and David Browning Culberson. His father was a Democratic politician. Culberson's family moved to Texas in 1856, settling first in Gilmer and later in Jefferson.

Culberson attended Virginia Military Institute, graduating in 1874, and subsequently studied law under his father and then at the University of Virginia at Charlottesville in 1876 and 1877. In 1877 he was admitted to the bar in Daingerfield, Texas, and commenced practice in Jefferson, later moving to Dallas in 1887. He was a member of the Jefferson Literacy Society and the Moot Court at the University of Virginia.

== Law career ==
Culberson started practicing law in Marion County in 1877. He was known for overturning a verdict for a man convicted of murder under the Ku Klux Law of Texas, and causing the law to be labeled as unconstitutional.

== Political career ==
=== Texas state politics ===
Culberson's political career began with his election as Attorney General of Texas in 1890, a position he held until 1895, after campaigning for and winning the governor's race in November 1894. During his tenure as governor, a wide range of reforms were carried out.

After serving two terms as governor, he was elected to the U.S. Senate as a Democrat on January 25, 1899.

=== Senate tenure ===
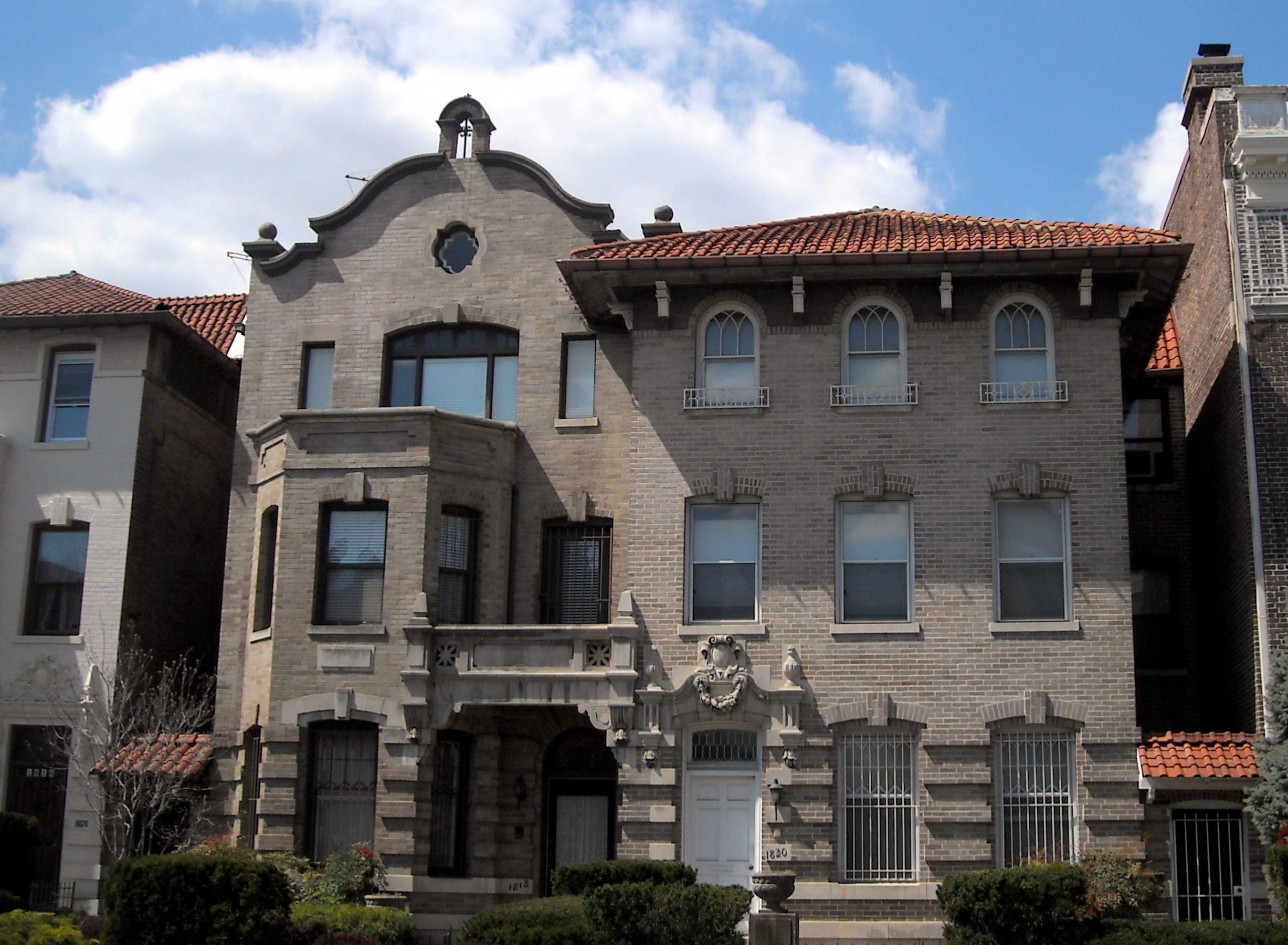
Culberson's former residence (right) in Washington, D.C.

Early during his tenure, he served on the Lodge Committee investigating war crimes in the Philippine–American War. Later, he chaired several senate committees, including the judiciary committee, which he chaired from 1913 to 1919. Culberson was opposed to demands for racial equality, stating that efforts to do so would lead to the "consequent debasement, degradation or destruction of the white race".

Culberson was reelected in 1905, 1911, and, again, by popular vote in 1916, when health problems and alcoholism prevented him from campaigning in Texas but did not prevent his reelection. However, his health and opposition to the Ku Klux Klan finally led to the loss of his seat in the Democratic primary in 1922.

He was succeeded by fellow Democrat Earle Bradford Mayfield, the outgoing member of the Texas Railroad Commission.

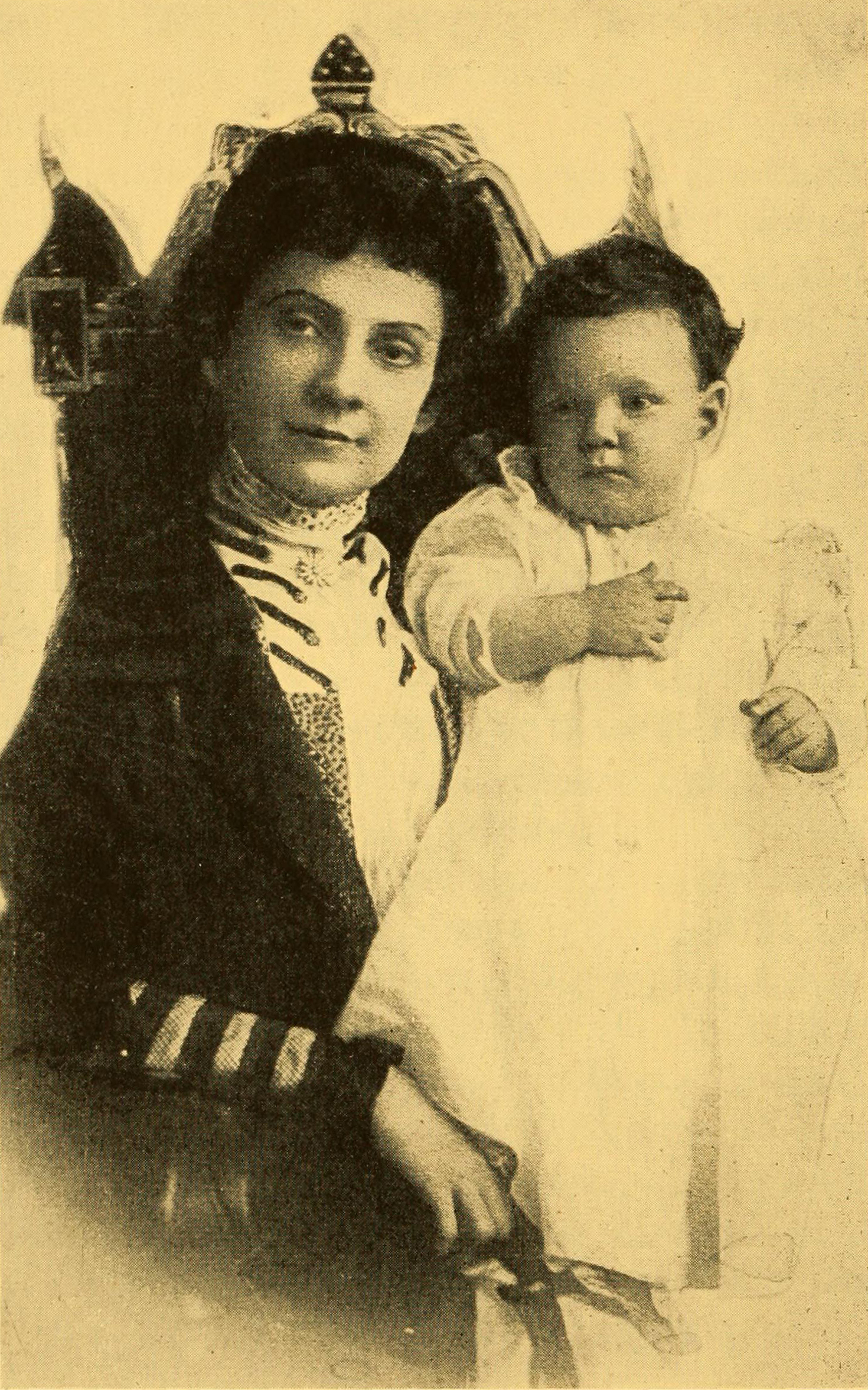
Sallie Harrison Culberson and daughter Mary

While serving in the senate, Culberson was described by labor leader Samuel Gompers as “a courageous, faithful and able advocate of the people’s demand for labor and for progressive legislation.”

== Personal life ==
Culberson married Sallie Harrison on December 7, 1882. They had one daughter, Mary Harrison.

Culberson lived in retirement until his death from pneumonia in Washington, D.C., on March 19, 1925. He is buried in East Oakwood Cemetery in Fort Worth, Texas.

Culberson was a distant cousin of John Culberson, who represented Texas' 7th congressional district between 2001 and 2019.

Legal offices
| Preceded by Jim Hogg | Attorney General of Texas; 1891–1895 | Succeeded by Martin McNulty Crane |
Party political offices
| Preceded by Jim Hogg | Democratic nominee for Governor of Texas; 1894, 1896 | Succeeded by Joseph D. Sayers |
| Preceded by Joseph Clay Stiles Blackburn | Chair of the Senate Democratic Caucus; 1907–1909 | Succeeded by Hernando Money |
| First | Democratic nominee for U.S. Senator from Texas (Class 1); 1916 | Succeeded by Earle Bradford Mayfield |
Political offices
| Preceded by Jim Hogg | Governor of Texas; 1895–1899 | Succeeded by Joseph D. Sayers |
U.S. Senate
| Preceded by Roger Q. Mills | U.S. Senator (Class 1) from Texas; 1899–1923; Served alongside: Horace Chilton, Joseph Bailey, Rienzi Johnston, Morris Sheppard | Succeeded by Earle B. Mayfield |
| Preceded by Hernando Money | Chair of the Senate Library Accommodations Committee; 1909–1911 | Succeeded by Joseph Weldon Bailey |
| Preceded by Thomas S. Martin | Chair of the Senate Public Health Committee; 1911–1913 | Succeeded by Joseph E. Ransdell |
| Preceded by Clarence D. Clark | Chair of the Senate Judiciary Committee; 1912–1919 | Succeeded by Knute Nelson |
| Preceded by Knute Nelson | Chair of the Senate Private Land Claims Committee; 1919–1921 | Position abolished |
