= 1896 Texas gubernatorial election =

- November 3, 1896
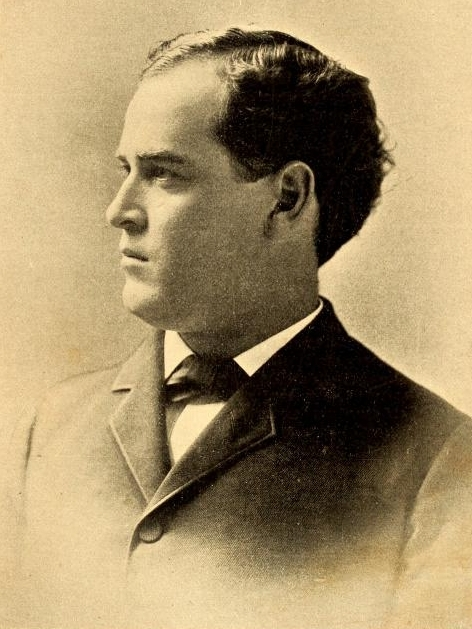

| Candidate | Charles Culberson | Jerome Kearby |
| Party | Democratic | Populist |
| Alliance | | Republican |
| Popular vote | 298,643 | 238,325 |
| Percentage | 55.36% | 44.18% |
- County results Culberson: 40–50% 50–60% 60–70% 70–80% 80–90% 90–100% Kearby: 40–50% 50–60% 60–70% 70–80% No Results
Governor before election
Charles Culberson
Democratic
Governor-elect
Charles Culberson
Democratic

The 1896 Texas gubernatorial election was held to elect the Governor of Texas. Governor Charles Culberson was re-elected to a second term over Jerome C. Kearby, a Populist running with Republican support.

The total vote recorded in the general election was nearly 540,000 and the most for any Texas election until the 1918 Democratic Party primary.

== General election ==
The election coincided with the 1896 presidential election and the issues which dominated the national race affected the statewide race. The monetary debate between bimetalism and the gold standard was the foremost political question facing the country. At the national Democratic party convention, William Jennings Bryan gave his famous "Cross of Gold" speech which led to him securing the nomination and solidifying the Democratic Party's position as being in favor of bimetalism. The policies that Bryan supported closely aligned with those of the national People's Party (Populists) and so at the Populist convention the national party decided on a strategy of electoral fusion with the Democrats and also nominated Bryan as their presidential candidate. In Texas, there was a large faction of "Gold Democrats" which threatened to split the party, but the state party ultimately consolidated endorsing the platform of bimetalism. Incumbent governor Charles Culberson had already been known as a free silver candidate and the party renominated him for a second term.

The fusion of parties brought about by the Bryan campaign was highly controversial in Texas. At the time the state was a member of the "Solid South" and the Democratic Party had dominated state politics. The Populists had become the main opposition party by critiquing the Democrats handling of public education and land administration while also accusing them of corruption. The Populists had found some success at winning seats to the state legislature and in the 1894 midterm elections had several candidates come within about 5% of winning their races in what were assumed to be safely democratic seats. At the People's Party convention, they selected the candidate who came the closest to winning a seat, former district attorney Jerome C. Kearby, as their gubernatorial nominee. Kearby opposed the national party's endorsement of the Bryan campaign. Other anti-fusionist candidates attempted to defy the national party organization and rally grassroots support for an independent national ticket, but procedural infighting ended the insurgency.

Nationally the Republican Party was buoyed by the landslide results in the 1894 midterm in which they gained control of Congress by fliping 130 seats, including a seat in Texas. This remains the single largest swing in the history of the House of Representatives. However in Texas, the state Republican Party was fractured and severely diminished. The "Regular" faction of the state party removed Norris W. Cuney from his role as chairman, which had held since 1886. He was eventually replaced by William Madison McDonald continuing the "Black and Tans" control of the party aparatus. The Republicans decided not to nominate their own candidates and instead threw their support behind the Populists, much to the dismay of the national Populist Party leadership. The rival "Reform" faction, also known as the "Lily Whites" for their opposition to African-American influence in the party, initially ran their own slate of candidates, but after negotiations with the mainline party withdrew their ticket.

=== Candidates ===
- Jerome Claiborne Kearby, lawyer from Dallas, former district attorney of Palestine, candidate for U.S. Representative in 1892 and 1894, major in the 29th Texas Cavalry (Populist)
- Randolph Clark, founder of Texas Christian University (Prohibition)
- Henry Cline, judge (Lily White Republican) (withdrawn)
- Charles Culberson, incumbent Governor (Democratic)

=== Results ===
1896 Texas gubernatorial election
| Party | Candidate | Votes | % | ±% |
|---|---|---|---|---|
| Democratic | Charles Culberson (incumbent) | 298,643 | 55.36% | ▲11.6 |
| Populist | Jerome C. Kearby | 238,325 | 44.18% | ▲8.05 |
| Prohibition | Randolph Clark | 2,196 | 0.34% | ▼0.03 |
| Write-in | | 682 | 0.13% | ▼0.12 |
| Total votes | | 539,496 | 100.00% | |
