= The Hogg Family and Houston =

2009 non-fiction book by Kate Sayen Kirkland

The Hogg Family and Houston: Philanthropy and the Civic Ideal
- Author: Kate Sayen Kirkland
- Language: English
- Subject: Houston, Texas
- Publisher: University of Texas Press
- Publication date: 2009
- Pages: 401
- ISBN: 978-0-292-79377-4

The Hogg Family and Houston: Philanthropy and the Civic Ideal is a 2009 non-fiction book by Kate Sayen Kirkland, published by the University of Texas Press. It discusses the Hogg family and its philanthropic efforts towards the city of Houston, Texas as well as its place in the progressivism movement.

== Background ==
Kirkland originates from Houston and is a historian.

== Reception ==
Mary Kelley Scheer of Lamar University wrote that the book is "Well written and extensively researched" and that "Kirkland has provided an engaging and insightful look into the often private world of philanthropy." Scheer criticized how the volume is sometimes too "laudatory" of the Hogg family, noting that privately financed philanthropy is "by its very nature" "elitist".

Kathleen D. McCarthy of the Graduate Center of the City University of New York wrote that the book "breaks new ground" by focusing on the relatively under-studied Hogg family and that "valuable, interesting, and readable tale of a single family's contributions to a major southern city." McCarthy stated that it would have been good if the author included comparisons to other female philanthropists.

== See also ==
- Hogg Building
- Ima Hogg
- James S. Hogg
- Varner–Hogg Plantation State Historic Site
