= 1892 Texas gubernatorial election =

- November 8, 1892
- Turnout: 73.48% (of eligible voters)
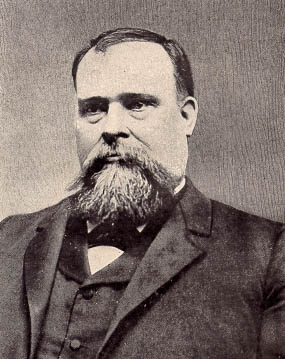

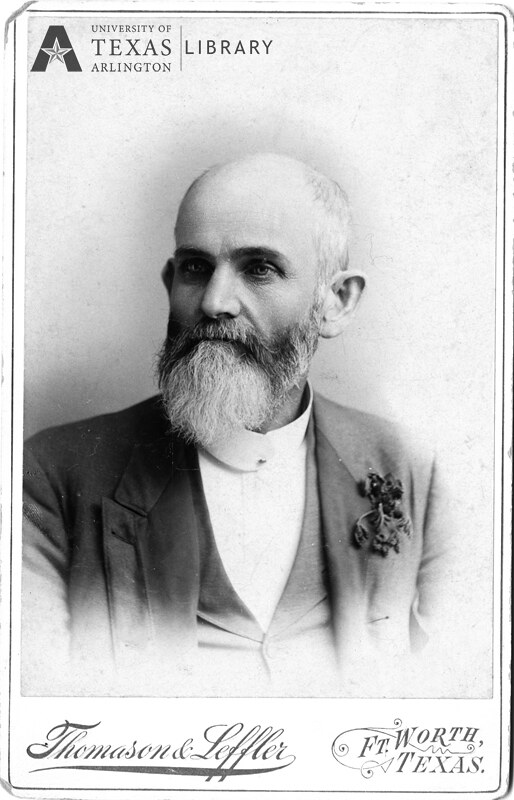
Candidate	Jim Hogg	George W. Clark	Thomas L. Nugent
Party	Democratic	Independent Democrat	Populist
Alliance		Republican
Popular vote	190,486	133,395	108,483
Percentage	43.74%	30.63%	24.91%
- County results Hogg: 30–40% 40–50% 50–60% 60–70% 70–80% 80–90% Clark: 30–40% 40–50% 50–60% 60–70% 70–80% 80–90% >90% Nugent: 30–40% 40–50% 50–60% 60–70% No data
Governor before election
Jim Hogg
Democratic
Governor-elect
Jim Hogg
Democratic

The 1892 Texas gubernatorial election took place on November 8, 1892, to elect the governor of Texas. Incumbent Democratic Governor Jim Hogg was re-elected to a second term with a plurality of the vote over George W. Clark, an independent Democrat with the backing of the Republican Party and state railroad interests, and Populist judge Thomas L. Nugent.

== Background ==
Hogg had been elected two years prior in 1890 primarily on a platform of establishing a state Railroad Commission, which could enforce laws protecting the public against powerful corporate railway interests more effectively than his Attorney General office and the state legislature. The creation of the Commission and other progressive "Hogg Laws" caused a rift within the state party between supporters of Hogg and conservative Bourbon Democrats who opposed his administration. Hogg additionally faced pressure from the state's Farmer's Alliance, one of the commission's original supporters, over his refusal to appoint one of their members to it, also criticizing his refusal to make the commission's membership elected, rather than appointed.

== Democratic convention ==
When the State convention met with Hogg's renomination almost assured, conservatives attempted to take control of the convention and block Hogg's election on the first ballot which would force the nomination of a compromise candidate. Both sides declared victory in appointing a chair of the convention and attempted to run the meeting simultaneously, but eventually the anti-Hogg faction bolted and formed their own convention in which they nominated George W. Clark, a prominent railroad attorney and former Attorney General on an independent Democratic ticket.

=== Republican alliance ===
The state Republican party, which had faced internal divisions over race since Norris Wright Cuney, an African-American, became party chairman in 1886, experienced a full split. A "Reform" faction, commonly known as the "Lily Whites" held a separate convention in which there were no African-American delegates and nominated their own ticket with Andrew Jackson Houston, son of the famous Sam Houston, at the top. The "Regular" Republican faction determined that instead of nominating a rival Republican ticket that was guaranteed to lose they would back the campaign of Clark against the incumbent administration.

== Populist convention ==
1892 was also the first statewide election contested by the People's party (or Populists), an agrarian movement which evolved out of the Farmers' Alliance in Texas. Its electorate was a coalition of small farmers, ranchers, and laborers. It advocated left-wing reforms such as state ownership of railways, a graduated income tax, and fiat currency. Despite strong support from many members, however, the party's platform did not endorse women's suffrage, prohibition, or Georgist taxation out of concern of being seen as too radical to win the general election.

At the start of the party's nominating convention in Dallas, Henry McCulloch, a former Confederate general, was the favorite to win the nomination due to his status and name recognition. Party leaders worried, however, that his age and health would hinder his campaign, so they sought to elevate former judge and prohibition advocate Thomas L. Nugent, instead. Stump Ashby, an early Populist leader, became the convention's president and successfully pushed to raise the vote threshold for nomination in the first round to seventy five percent. McCulloch defeated Nugent 547 to 412 in the first round, short of the raised threshold. Most of McCulloch's delegates were only pledged to him for the first round of voting, and with Nugent likely to convert many of their votes in the second round, McCulloch withdrew from the race, handing Nugent the party's nomination.

The Populists in Texas benefited from grass-roots communication structures developed by the Farmer's Alliance. In spite of this support, Nugent saw the race as hopeless, the Hogg-Clark fight having overshadowed any third parties. He instead viewed his campaign as an educational opportunity for the state on the merits of the Populist movement.

== General election ==
=== Candidates ===
- George W. Clark, railroad attorney and former Texas attorney general (Independent Democrat)
- James "Jim" Hogg, incumbent governor (Democratic)
- Andrew Jackson Houston, U.S. marshal for the Eastern District of Texas, son of former governor and U.S. Senator Sam Houston (Lily White Republican)
- Thomas Lewis Nugent, former judge of the 29th District Court, nonpartisan candidate for the Texas Supreme Court in 1888, lawyer, former teacher (Populist)
- Davis M. Prendergast, banker and prohibition organizer from Mexia (Prohibition)

=== Results ===
Despite concerns that Nugent and the Populists would siphon off enough votes to throw the election to Clark, Hogg won reelection by a substantial margin (57,091 votes). This was the first time a governor had won an election with less than a majority of the popular vote since 1861. Hogg had positioned himself between the two candidates, advocating for neither government owned nor unrestrained railroads but rather "their just control and regulation through the Commission." Farmers and ranchers were a decisive voter bloc in the election who broke strongly for Hogg. Clark on the other hand saw most his support come from urban centers and the more developed gulf coast. Nugent's showing was more spread out but he received the vote of roughly half the Texas Farmers Alliance membership. Nugent received almost none of the state's substantial African American vote despite the party's overtures to the demographic.

1892 Texas gubernatorial election
Party	Candidate	Votes	%	±%
Democratic	Jim Hogg (incumbent)	190,486	43.74%	▼32.7
Ind. Democrat	George W. Clark	133,395	30.63%	N/A
Populist	Thomas Lewis Nugent	108,483	24.91%	N/A
Prohibition	Davis M. Prendergast	1,605	0.37%	▼0.35
Republican	Andrew Jackson Houston	1,322	0.30%	▼22.3
Write-in		176	0.04%	N/A
Total votes		435,467	100.00%	

== Bibliography ==
- Cantrell, Gregg (2020). The People's Revolt: Texas Populists and the Roots of American Liberalism. New Haven, Connecticut: Yale University Press. ISBN 978-0-300-10097-6.
