= 1890 Texas gubernatorial election =

- November 4, 1890
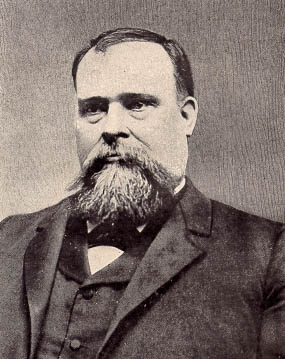

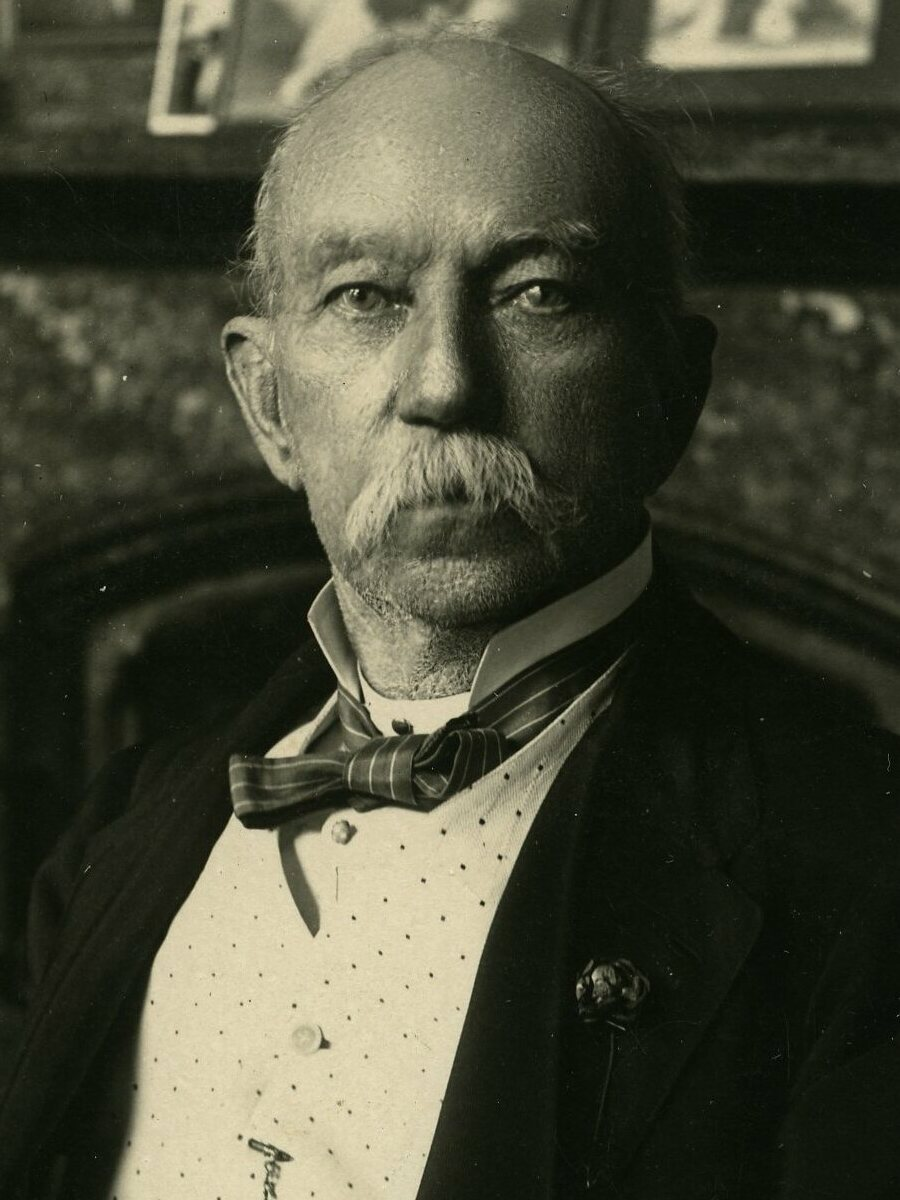
Candidate	Jim Hogg	Webster Flanagan
Party	Democratic	Republican
Popular vote	262,432	77,742
Percentage	76.45%	22.65%
- County results Hogg: 50–60% 60–70% 70–80% 80–90% 90–100% Flanagan: 50–60% 60–70% 70–80% 80–90% No Data/Vote
Governor before election
Lawrence Sullivan Ross
Democratic
Governor-elect
Jim Hogg
Democratic

The 1890 Texas gubernatorial election was held to elect the Governor of Texas. Attorney General Jim Hogg was elected over Republican Webster Flanagan. Hogg was the first governor of Texas to be born in the state.

== General election ==
During this period, Texas was a part of the "Solid South" and the Democratic party was highly favored in statewide elections.

The railroad industry had rapidly expanded since the end of the civil war, and they were now in possession of large amounts of property across the state. The farmers and ranchers in the state also relied on the railroads to transport their agricultural goods to market and unregulated railroads could extract more money from them by rate fixing and other monopolistic practices. In 1887, Congress passed the Interstate Commerce Act which created a national regulatory agency to combat these practices. Jim Hogg, who had spent a lot of effort in legal battles against railroads as the state's Attorney General, advocated the creation of a similar agency at the state level. The main issue of the campaign became whether this agency should exist and what its scope and powers should be. Hogg received considerable support from the Farmer's Alliance for his support of the railroad commission, although he did not support many of their more radical policies.

=== Candidates ===
- David Webster Flanagan, former state senator, delegate to the State Constitutional Convention of 1875, son of former U.S. Senator and Lt. Gov. James Flanagan (Republican)
- Richard Moore Hall, Commissioner of the General Land Office, rancher, land surveyor (Democratic) (withdrawn)
- Ephraim Charles Heath, former state representative, former Rockwall County judge (Prohibition)
- James "Jim" Hogg, Attorney General of Texas, former district attorney of the Seventh Judicial District, former Justice of the Peace of Quitman (Democratic)
- James W. Throckmorten, former congressman, former governor, unsuccessful candidate for the Democratic nomination in the 1878 gubernatorial race (Democratic) (withdrawn)

=== Results ===
1890 Texas gubernatorial election
Party	Candidate	Votes	%	±%
Democratic	Jim Hogg	262,432	76.45%	▲4.68
Republican	Webster Flanagan	77,742	22.65%	N/A
Prohibition	E.C. Heath	2,463	0.72%	▼27.51
Write-in		633	0.18%	N/A
Total votes		343,270	100.00%	

== Aftermath ==
In 1891, the state legislature created the Texas Railroad Commission, the state's first regulatory agency. The three member body was given jurisdiction over the operations of railroads, terminals, wharves, and express companies. It could set rates, issue rules on how to classify freight, require adequate railroad reports, and prohibit and punish discrimination and extortion by corporations. Though it faced many challenges in its early years, it was successful at lowering rates in the state. In 1891, a typical rate was 1.403 cents per ton mile. By 1907, the rate was 1.039 cents—a decline of 25%.

Hogg's first appointments to the Commission were United States Senator John H. Reagan, former Speaker of the Texas House Lafayette L. Foster, and former congressman William P. McLean. In 1894, the agency became an elected position with each member serving a staggered 6 year term.
