= Thomas Elisha Hogg =

American writer and scholar

Thomas Elisha Hogg (June 19, 1842 – September 1880) was an American teacher, lawyer, editor and writer, brother of James Stephen Hogg, Governor of Texas, and uncle of Ima Hogg. Ima was named from an epic Civil War poem, The Fate of Marvin, that Thomas Hogg had written. He used the pseudonym Tom R. Burnett.
