= Jim Hogg =

American lawyer and statesman (1851–1906)

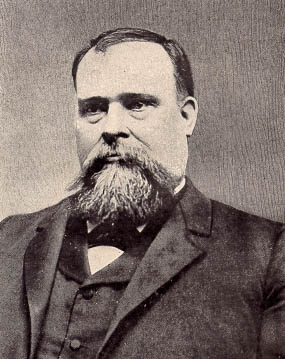

20th Governor of Texas
- In office January 20, 1891 – January 15, 1895
- Lieutenant: George C. Pendleton; Martin McNulty Crane
- Preceded by: Lawrence Sullivan Ross
- Succeeded by: Charles Allen Culberson

22nd Attorney General of Texas
- In office November 2, 1886 – November 4, 1890
- Governor: Lawrence Sullivan Ross
- Preceded by: John D. Templeton
- Succeeded by: Charles Allen Culberson

Personal details
- Born: James Stephen Hogg; March 24, 1851 Cherokee County, Texas, U.S.
- Died: March 3, 1906 (aged 54) Houston, Texas, U.S.
- Resting place: Oakwood Cemetery; Austin, Texas, U.S.
- Party: Democratic
- Spouse: Sarah Ann Stinson
- Children: 4, including Ima
- Parent(s): Joseph L. Hogg; Lucanda McMath
- Profession: Lawyer, newspaperman, public servant

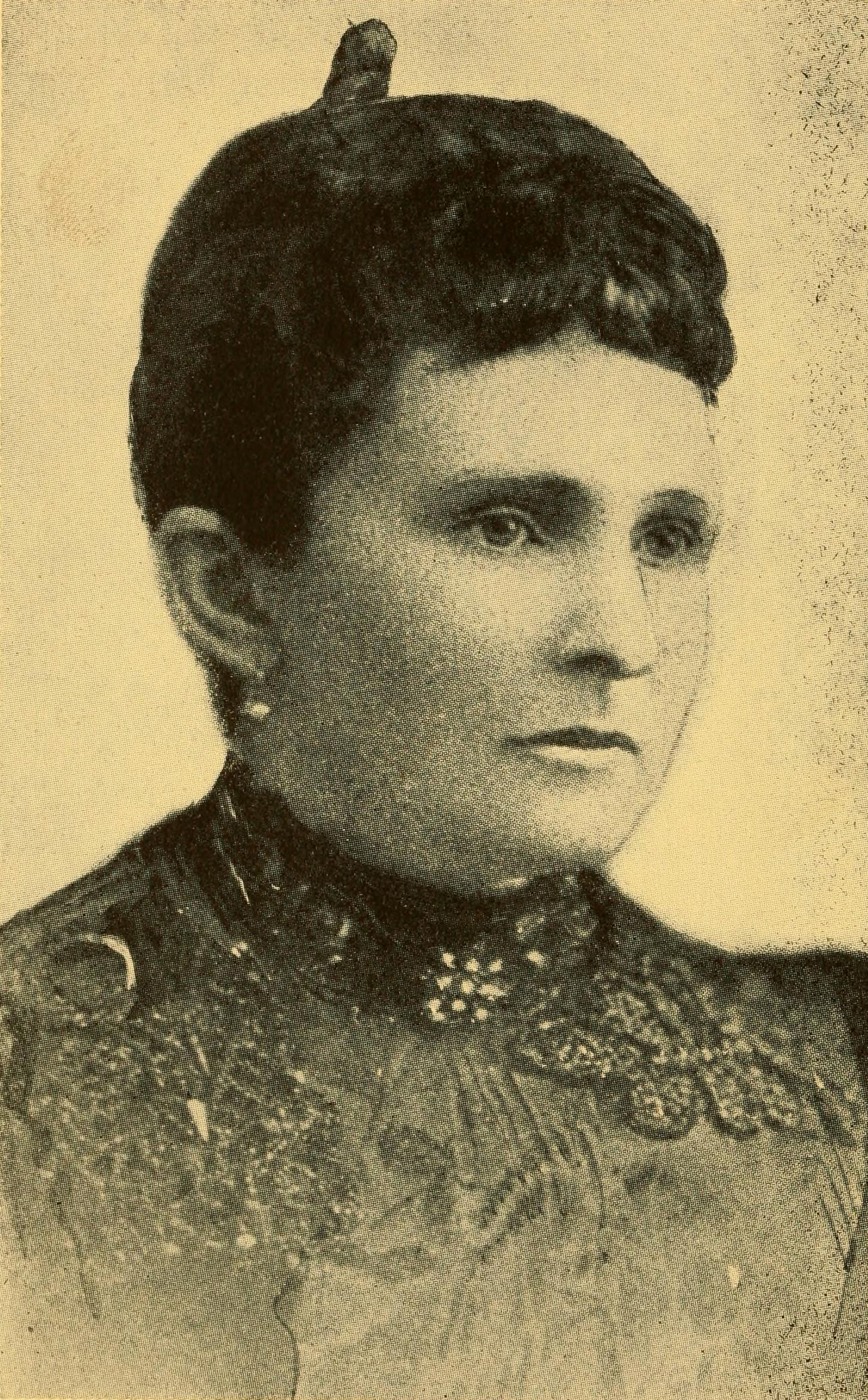
Hogg's wife, Sarah Ann Stinson

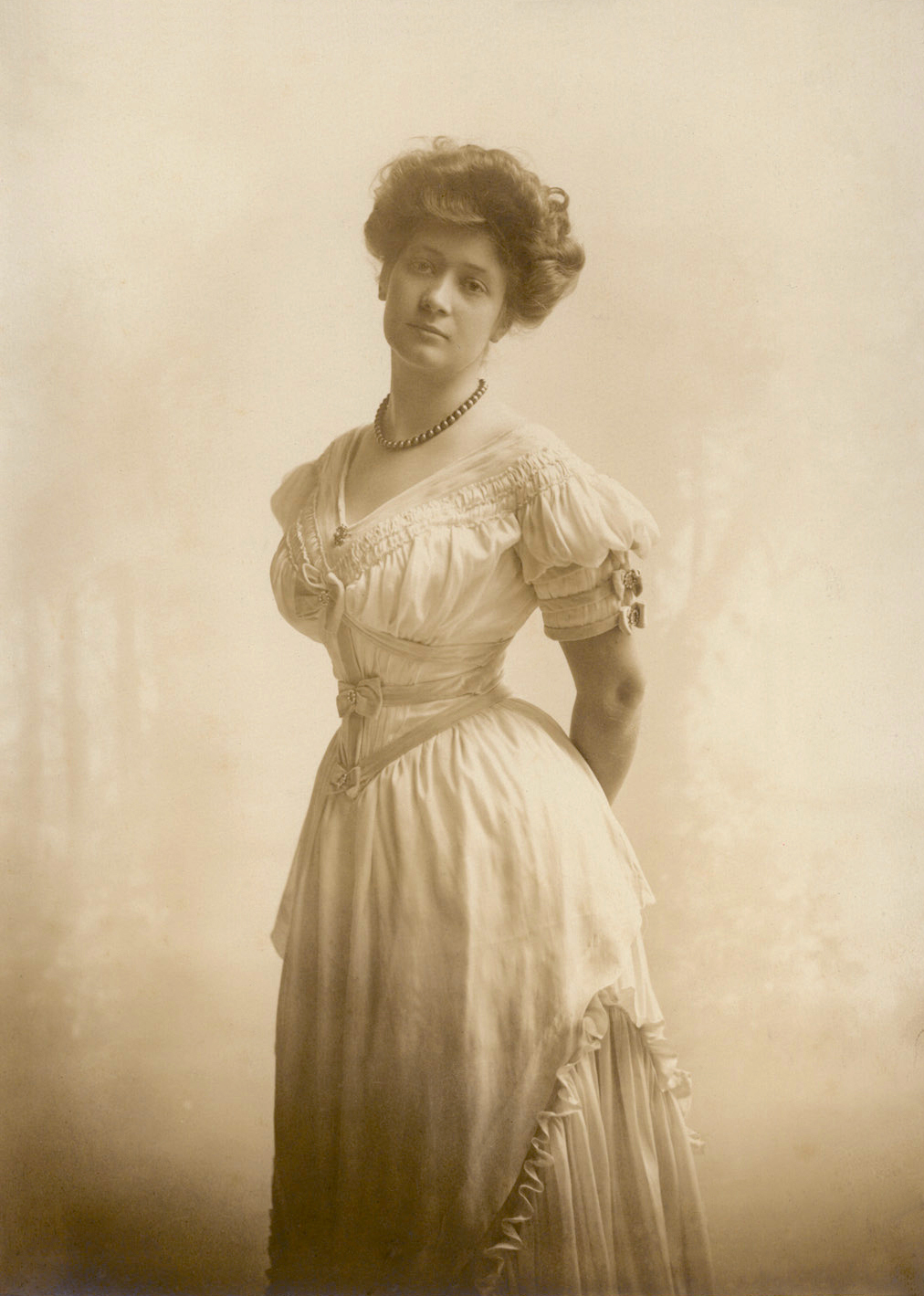
Ima Hogg, circa 1900

James Stephen Hogg (March 24, 1851 – March 3, 1906) was an American lawyer and statesman who served as the 20th governor of Texas from 1891 to 1895. He was born near Rusk, Texas. Hogg was a follower of the conservative New South Creed which became popular following the U.S. Civil War, and was also associated with populism. He was the first Texas Governor to have been born in the state.

Hogg is often remembered for naming his daughter Ima, an odd name which derived from a poem written by James's brother, Thomas Elisha Hogg. The story that she had a sister or sisters with odd names (proposed names including "Hoosa", "Ura" and "Wera") is an urban legend.

Hogg's time as governor was notable for the passage of a wide range of progressive reforms.

== Early years ==
Hogg was born in Cherokee County, Texas. His parents, Joseph L. Hogg and Lucanda McMath had moved to Texas in late 1836. During the Civil War, his father served as a brigadier general in the Confederate States Army. Joseph Hogg died in 1862, and Lucanda died the following year. Hogg and his two brothers were raised by their sister, Frances. The family had little money, and Hogg received only a basic education before being asked to go to work.

In 1866, Hogg went to Tuscaloosa, Alabama, to study. Upon returning to Texas, he became a printer's devil at the Rusk Chronicle. In 1867, Hogg walked from East Texas to Cleburne, where he found a job with the Cleburne Chronicle. Soon after his arrival the building which housed the Cleburne Chronicle burned down, and Hogg returned to East Texas. For the next several years he worked as a farmhand and studied law. He later ran the Longview News and founded the Quitman News. His practice as a newspaperman trained Hogg not just in the area of writing but also oration in addition to political insights. Particularly, he learned debating through discussions with veteran reporters in newspaper offices.

== Public service ==
In 1873, Hogg was named Justice of the Peace at Quitman. On April 22, 1874, he married Sarah Ann Stinson. The couple settled a frame houyse in Quitman, where their first child, William Clifford, was born in 1875. They had three other children, Ima (1882), Michael (1885), and Thomas Elijah (1887). Ima was named for the heroine of the poem The Fate of Marvin, written by Hogg's older brother Tom in 1873. Although legend states that the Hoggs also had a daughter named Ura, that allegation is false.

In 1876, he was defeated by John S. Griffith for a seat in the Texas legislature. He was also admitted to the bar in the same year. He returned to public service in 1878 when he was elected Wood County's attorney, and he went on to serve from 1880 to 1884 as Texas' seventh district's attorney.

Hogg was one of the men responsible for making Smith County a Democratic stronghold during the 1884 national elections, as he helped convince the black vote for the Democratic party. Although encouraged to run for a seat in the United States Congress, Hogg declined and practiced law in Tyler.

== Attorney general ==
Hogg was elected state Attorney General in 1886 with the platform of railroad regulation reform. At that time, the state had the power to regulate the transportation industry, but existing laws were either unenforced or inadequate. Through "various legal maneuvers", Hogg forced the out-of-state corporations operating the railroads to establish operating offices in the state. He also put an end to pooling by the railroads and suggested that the legislature propose a constitutional amendment to create the Railroad Commission of Texas. In 1888 Hogg sued the rail companies for attempting to create a monopoly, among other charges. Hogg won, defeating the powerful rail baron Jay Gould and creating for himself a name in Texas politics.

Hogg also endeavored to rein in abuses by other large corporations. He tackled the "wildcat" insurance companies, forcing several of them to leave the state and requiring others to operate within the parameters of the law. Under his guidance, Texas became the second state to pass a workable antitrust law.

== Governor ==
With the support of farmers, ranchers, and small merchants, Hogg won the election for Governor of Texas in 1890. At the same time, voters approved the constitutional amendment allowing for a Railroad Commission by a wide margin. On April 3, 1891, the legislature overwhelmingly passed a bill to create the Railroad Commission. Hogg appointed Lafayette L. Foster and William Pinckney McLean as commissioners, with John H. Reagan, creator of the Interstate Commerce Act, as chairman. Hogg also named an old friend, Captain Bill McDonald, to succeed Samuel A. McMurry as the captain of Texas Rangers Company B, Frontier Battalion, a position that he retained until 1907.

Hogg campaigned for a second term in 1892 on five principles: to uphold the state constitution, to support the Railroad Commission, to stop the railroads from issuing watered stocks, to regulate the issuance of county and municipal bonds, and to regulate alien land ownership. When his opponent for the Democratic nomination, George Clark, realized that Hogg would likely win the nomination, Clark's supporters left the Democratic convention and went to a new location. There they formed a new party, the Jeffersonian Democrats, and nominated Clark for governor. Hogg was easily nominated as the Democratic candidate by the remaining delegates.

The Republican Party endorsed Clark, and the Populist Party nominated lawyer Thomas Lewis Nugent. Hogg won a plurality of the votes to gain a second term as governor, but it was the first time in state history that the winning Democratic candidate did not receive a majority of the votes.

During his second term, Hogg endorsed three constitutional amendments. Voters defeated the proposals to charter state banks and to provide a pension for indigent Confederate veterans, but approved the amendment to allow for public election of the railroad commissioners. At his urging, the legislature passed a law allowing the Railroad Commission to fix rates based on fair valuation and to stop many of the practices the railroad companies had used to manipulate stocks. When the Supreme Court upheld the constitutionality of the commission in Reagan v. Farmers Loan and Trust in 1894, this law helped them to be fully equipped to fight the power of the railroads.

In April 1893, the legislature passed a law requiring that communities which issued bonds should also have a plan to collect sufficient taxes to pay the interest. Hogg's final campaign promise was fulfilled when the legislature passed the Perpetuities and Corporation Land Law, which required private corporations to sell all land they had held for speculative purposes within 15 years The law was full of loopholes and did not have the effect that Hogg wanted.

In 1894, Texas filed a lawsuit against John D. Rockefeller's Standard Oil Company and its Texas subsidiary, the Waters-Pierce Oil Company of Missouri. Hogg and his attorney general argued that the companies were engaged in rebates, price fixing, consolidation, and other tactics prohibited by the state's 1889 antitrust act. The investigation resulted in a number of indictments, including one for Rockefeller. Hogg requested that Rockefeller be extradited from New York, but the New York governor refused, as Rockefeller had not fled from Texas. Rockefeller was never tried, but other employees of the company were found guilty.

Hogg championed the causes of individuals and presided over a series of progressive reform measures during his tenure. Amongst others, these included a lien law, an act that restricted (as noted by one study) “the amount of indebtedness by bond issues that county and municipal groups could legally undertake,” a law forcing land corporations to sell of their holdings in 15 years, a railroad stock and bond law to cut down on watered stock, and a Railroad Commission. An alien land law was also introduced that guaranteed (as noted by one study) “Texas lands to be safe from ownsership without taxation by foreigners.” Public school systems were also upgraded while towns and cities were kept “from imposing extravagant public debts on the people.”

According to Democrat Edward M House, a Texas politician and top advisor to President Woodrow Wilson, Texas was “the pioneer of successful progressive legislation,” citing Hogg’s tenure as the catalyst:

The great measures which Governor Hogg advocated, like the Railroad Commission, the Stock and Bond law, were largely written into national law later. Texas was the pioneer of successful progressive legislation, and it was all started during Hogg's administrations....I see it stated from time to time that California, Wisconsin, and other States were the first to impress the progressive movement upon the nation. This is not true; Texas was the first in the field, and the others followed.

In a National Geographic article in 1961, Stanley Walker wrote that Hogg was "remembered as a man of uncommon ability" and was one of Texas' greatest governors.

== Later years ==
Hogg's term as governor ended in 1895, the same year his wife died. Although he was not wealthy when he left office, through his connections he became involved in land and oil deals and amassed a large fortune.

He spoke on behalf of William Jennings Bryan in Tammany Hall in 1896 and 1900. Hogg also became interested in the idea of what became the Panama Canal; having done well as an oil investor, Hogg had interest for a shipping route to open between Texas and South America, as well as between Texas and Asia. On April 19, 1900, he gave a speech in Waco, where he spoke the later legendary words: "Let us have Texas, the Empire State, (be) governed by the people, not Texas, the truckpatch, ruled by corporate lobbyists".

In 1901, Hogg founded the Texas Company, predecessor to Texaco, with Joseph S. Cullinan, John Warne Gates, and Arnold Schlaet.

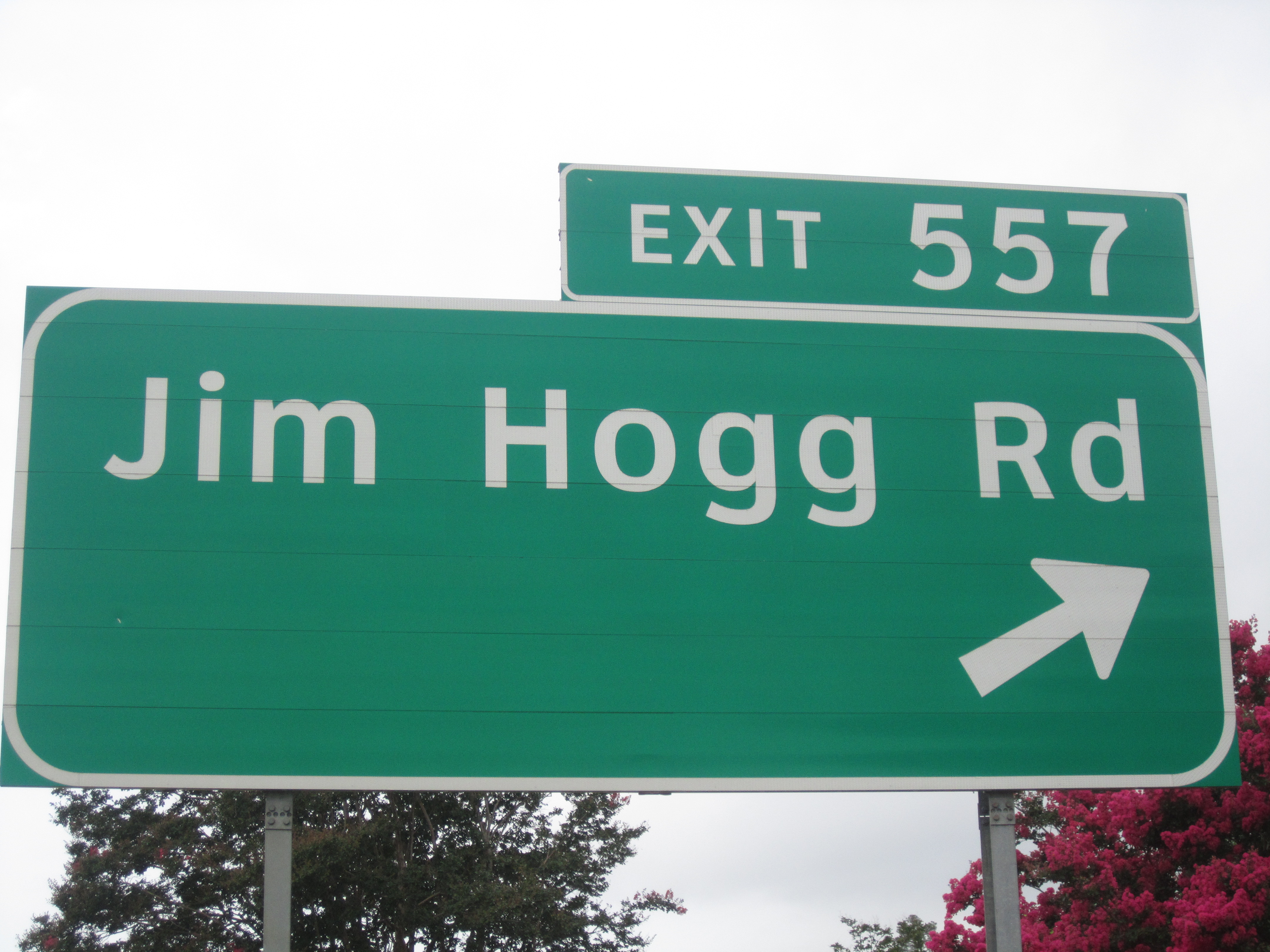
Jim Hogg Road exit in [Smith County, Texas] off Interstate 20 northwest of Tyler, Texas

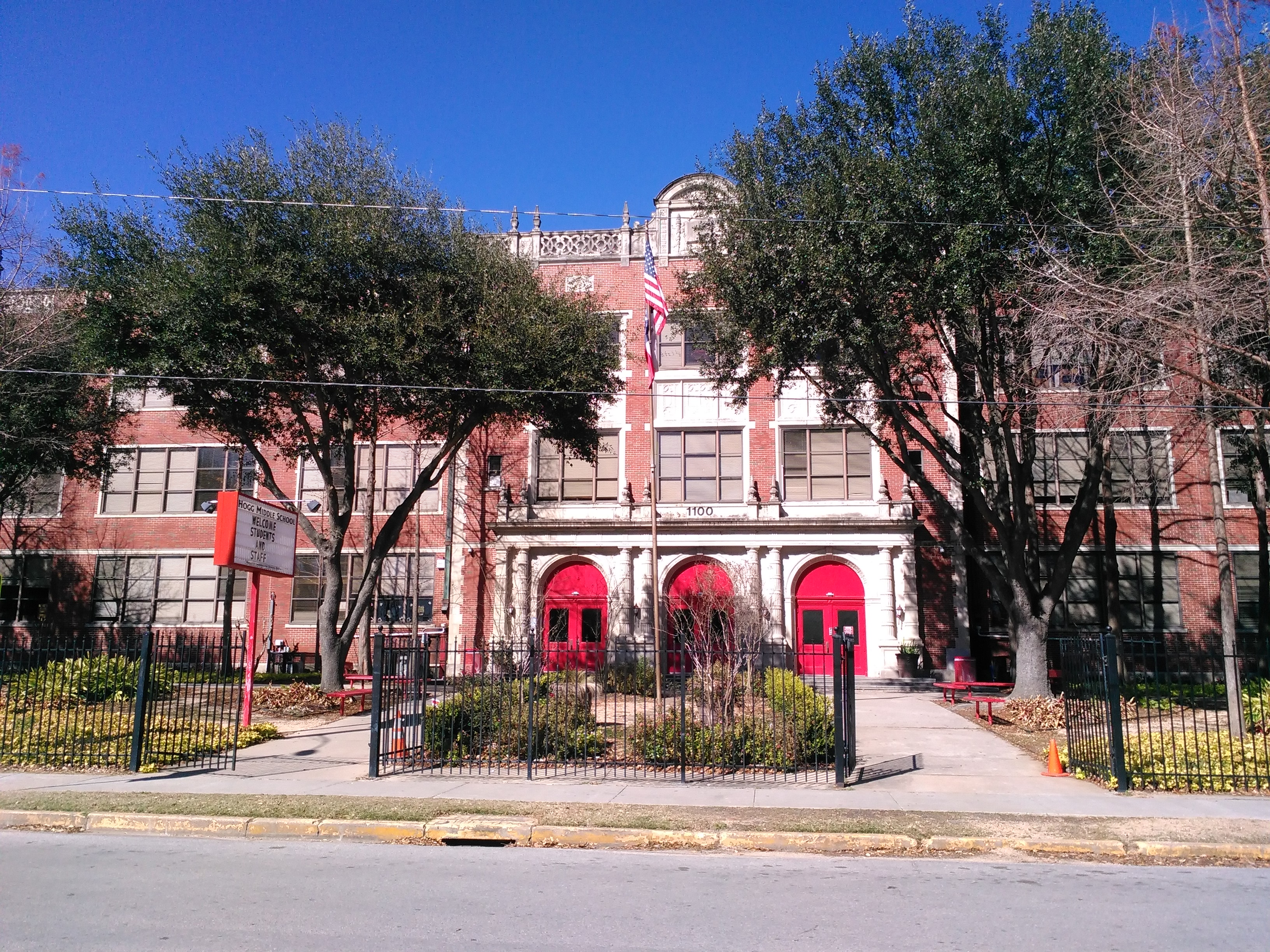
Hogg Middle School in Norhill, Houston

Jim Hogg's popularity extended beyond Texas, particularly in New York. The "Man in the Street" column in the edition of September 6, 1903, of The New York Times related the following anecdote regarding him:

Ex-Gov. Hogg of Texas, who has a reputation for liking to play a practical joke every time he gets a chance, says he has been cured of the habit. The last time he was in New York the joke he tried to perpetrate was turned back at him in great style. It happened that he wanted a shoe shine. The bootblack, a small-sized Italian, began to chatter at him after he had taken his seat in the high chair. Not being in a conversational frame of mind, the portly Governor thought it would be a good plan to feign that he was deaf and dumb. So he responded by signs to everything the bootblack said.

This proceeding naturally caused the desired silence on the part of the Italian, and the Governor was wrapped in his own thoughts, when suddenly a little newsboy ran up and asked him if he wanted a paper. Before he could reply the bootblack turned to the boy and said:

"You nota talka to him. He deaf."

The newsboy looked him over, says the Governor, and then remarked in a loud voice:

"Well, say, he's a fat old hog, ain't he?"

The Governor, who weighs 300 pounds or more, relishes telling the story, but he adds feelingly that he kept up his bluff after hearing the brutal comment of the newsboy.

— "Man in the Street", New York Times, 1903

In January 1905, Hogg was injured in a railroad accident while on a business trip. He never completely recovered and died in his sleep on March 3, 1906, at the age of 54. He is buried in Oakwood Cemetery in Austin, Texas.

Jim Hogg County southeast of Laredo is named after him.

In addition James S. Hogg Middle School in Norhill, Houston, of the Houston Independent School District, is named after him.

== Burial ==
Hogg asked that a pecan tree be planted at his grave instead of a traditional headstone, requesting that the seeds be distributed throughout the state to make Texas a "Land of Trees". His wish was carried out and this brought more attention to pecan trees. In 1919, the Legislature made the pecan tree the state tree of Texas.

The Texas town of San Saba claims to be "The Pecan Capital of the World". Several other American towns and regions host annual events celebrating the pecan harvest.

== Legacy ==
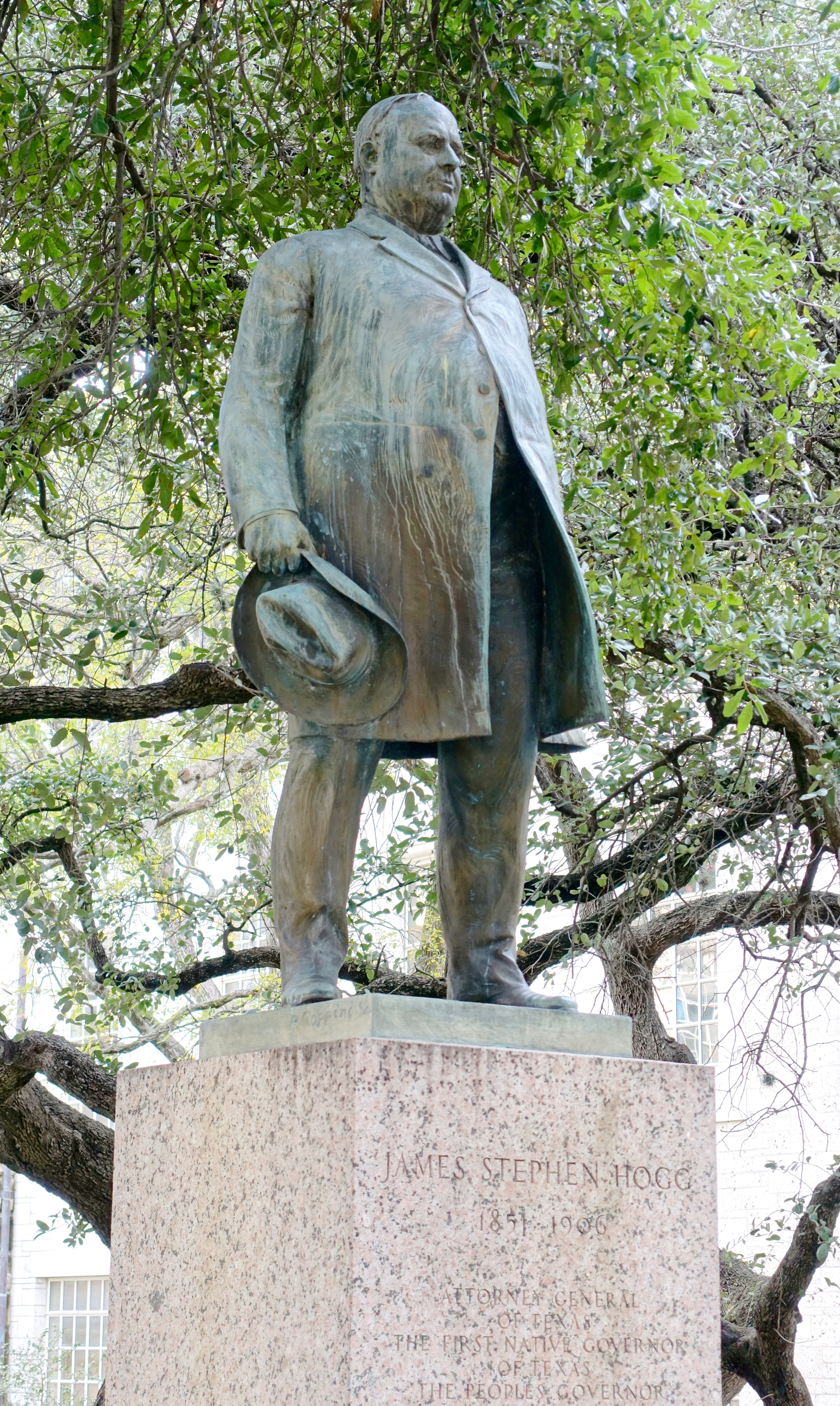
Statue of Hogg in Austin, Texas, United States, 2015

Jim Hogg County, Texas is named after him.

A statue of Hogg was sculpted by Italian American sculptor Pompeo Coppini. The sculpture was commissioned in 1919 by George W. Littlefield to be included in the Littlefield Fountain on the campus of the University of Texas at Austin.

A statue of Hogg was unveiled and erected in Rusk, Texas in October 2025.

== See also ==
- Sid McMath, a distant cousin of Hogg who served as Governor of Arkansas (1949–1953) and has been historically compared with him
- The Hogg Family and Houston, a book about the family
- James S. Hogg Middle School, middle school built in 1926 on land donated by the Hogg estate

== Notes ==
Party political offices
Preceded by Lawrence Sullivan Ross	Democratic nominee for Governor of Texas; 1890, 1892	Succeeded by Charles Allen Culberson
Legal offices
Preceded by John D. Templeton	Attorney General of Texas; 1890–1894	Succeeded by Charles Allen Culberson
Political offices
Preceded by Lawrence Sullivan Ross	Governor of Texas; 1891–1895	Succeeded by Charles Allen Culberson
