= 1986 Texas Senate election =

- November 4, 1986

16 of the 31 seats in the Texas Senate 16 seats needed for a majority
	Majority party	Minority party
Party	Democratic	Republican
Last election	25	6
Seats won	25	6
Seat change	Steady	Steady
- Senate results by district Democratic hold Republican hold No election
President Pro Tempore before election
Democratic
Elected President Pro Tempore
Democratic

The 1986 Texas Senate elections took place as part of the biennial United States elections. Texas voters elected state senators in 16 of the 31 State Senate. The winners of this election served in the 70th Texas Legislature.

== Background ==
Democrats had controlled the Texas Senate since the 1872 elections.

== Results ==
Democrats maintained their supermajority in the chamber, winning 25 seats to the Republicans' 6. The Senate had its most female members in its history up to that point with newly elected Senators Eddie Bernice Johnson and Judith Zaffirini joining Cyndi Taylor Krier in the chamber.

=== Results by district ===
District	Democratic		Republican		Others		Total		Result
District	Votes	%	Votes	%	Votes	%	Votes	%	Result
District 5	-	100.00%	-	-	-	-	-	100.00%	Democratic hold
District 6	52,051	99.94%	-	-	29	0.06%	52,080	100.00%	Democratic hold
District 7	-	-	-	100.00%	-	-	-	100.00%	Republican hold
District 10	-	-	97,690	93.28%	7,036	6.72%	104,726	100.00%	Republican hold
District 11	54,256	63.82%	30,762	36.18%	-	-	85,018	100.00%	Democratic hold
District 12	67,299	58.76%	47,233	41.24%	-	-	114,532	100.00%	Democratic hold
District 13	-	100.00%	-	-	-	-	-	100.00%	Democratic hold
District 15	-	100.00%	-	-	-	-	-	100.00%	Democratic hold
District 16	33,512	31.64%	72,397	68.36%	-	-	105,909	100.00%	Republican hold
District 18	76,723	61.63%	47,771	38.37%	-	-	124,494	100.00%	Democratic hold
District 19	44,642	61.74%	26,743	36.98%	925	1.28%	72,310	100.00%	Democratic hold
District 21	59,153	51.94%	54,736	48.06%	-	-	113,889	100.00%	Democratic hold
District 23	61,538	76.57%	18,832	23.43%	-	-	80,370	100.00%	Democratic hold
District 25	-	100.00%	-	-	-	-	-	100.00%	Democratic hold
District 27	-	100.00%	-	-	-	-	-	100.00%	Democratic hold
District 29	-	100.00%	-	-	-	-	-	100.00%	Democratic hold
Total	–	–	–	–	–	–	–	100.00%	Source:
