= 6th Texas Legislature =

The 6th Texas Legislature met from November 5, 1855 to September 1, 1856 in its regular session and one adjourned session. All 80 members of the Texas House of Representatives and about half of the members of the Texas Senate were elected in 1855.

== Sessions ==
- 6th Regular session: November 5, 1855 – February 4, 1856
- 6th Adjourned session: July 7–September 1, 1856

== Officers ==
=== Senate ===
Lieutenant Governor
Hardin Richard Runnels, Democrat
President pro tempore
Jesse Grimes, Regular session, Adjourned session

=== House of Representatives ===
Speaker of the House
Hamilton P. Bee

== Members ==
=== Senate ===
Members of the Texas Senate for the Sixth Texas Legislature:

District	Senator	Party	Took office
1	Solomon H. Pirkey	Democrat	1855
2	Johnson Wren	Democrat	1855
3	Robert H. Taylor	Democrat	1855
4	Malachi W. Allen	Democrat	1853
5	Jefferson Weatherford	Democrat	1853
6	Jonathan Russell	Democrat	1855
7	M. D. K. Taylor	Democrat	1851
8	William Thomas Scott	Democrat	1851 (First time: 1846–1847)
9	James Winwright Flanagan	Democrat	1855
10	Elisha Everett Lott	Democrat	1853
11	Robert Henry Guinn	Democrat	1853
12	William M. Taylor	Democrat	1855
13	Madison G. Whitaker	Democrat	1853
14	James A. Truitt	Democrat	1855 (First time: 1851–1853)
15	James M. Burroughs	Democrat	1855
16	Henry C. Pedigo	Democrat	1853
17	Mark M. Potter	Democrat	1851
18	Edward A. Palmer	Democrat	1855
19	Jesse Grimes	Democrat	1855 (First time: 1846–1853)
20	James W. McDade	Democrat	1853
21	Elliot McNeil Millican	Democrat	1853
22	William Harrison "Howdy" Martin	Democrat	1853
23	James H. Armstrong	Democrat	1851
24	Guy Morrison Bryan	Democrat	1853
25	John Caldwell	Democrat	1855
26	Samuel Addison White	Democrat	1855
27	Henry Eustace McCulloch	Democrat	1855
28	Edwin B. Scarborough	Democrat	1855
29	Edward R. Hord	Democrat	1855
30	Antoine Supervièle	Democrat	1853
31	Samuel A. Maverick	Democrat	1855
32	Isaac Lafayette Hill	Democrat	1853
33	Rufus Doane	Democrat	1851

=== House of Representatives ===
Members of the House of Representatives for the Sixth Texas Legislature:

- John David German Adrian
- Hamilton P. Bee
- N. B. Charlton
- John Winfield Scott Dancy
- Isaac N. Dennis
- Julien Sidney Devereux
- David Catchings Dickson
- Mathew Duncan Ector
- James Carlton Francis
- James Alfred Head
- John Rhodes King
- Pleasant Williams Kittrell
- Matthew Fielding Locke
- Jefferson Carruthers McAlpine
- John Hazelrigg McClanahan
- Robert Caldwell Neblett
- Anthony Banning Norton
- William Beck Ochiltree
- Dr. Lewis S. Owings
- Benjamin F. Parker
- John Sayles
- Ashbel Smith
- William Stedman
- Benjamin E. Tarver
- William S. Taylor
- Leslie A. Thompson
- William M. "Buckskin" Williams
- Israel Worsham
