= Texas's 6th Senate district =

American legislative district

Texas's 4th State Senate district
Senator
Carol Alvarado; D–Houston
- Demographics: 10.1% White; 12.7% Black; 75.3% Hispanic; 2.4% Asian
- Population: 863,488

District 6 of the Texas Senate is a senatorial district that serves a portion of Harris county in the U.S. state of Texas. The seat is currently held by Carol Alvarado, who won a 2018 special election after the resignation of Senator Sylvia Garcia.

== Election history ==
Election history of District 6 from 1992.

=== 2024 ===
Texas general election, 2024: Senate District 6
Party	Candidate	Votes	%
Democratic	Carol Alvarado	119,280	63.01
Republican	Martha Fierro	70,013	36.99
Majority		49,267	26.02
Turnout		189,293	
Democratic hold			

=== 2022 ===
Carol Alvarado (Democratic) was unopposed; as such, the election was cancelled and Alvarado was declared elected without a vote.

=== 2020 ===
Change with 2016.

Texas general election, 2020: Senate District 6
Party	Candidate	Votes	%	±%
Democratic	Carol Alvarado	137,895	84.05	−15.95
Libertarian	Timothy Duffield	26,166	15.95	+15.95
Majority		111,729	68.10	−31.90
Turnout		164,061		
Democratic hold				

=== 2018 (special) ===
2018 Texas Senate District 6 special election - 11 December 2018
Party	Candidate	Votes	%
Democratic	Carol Alvarado	7,629	50.37
Democratic	Ana Hernandez	3,690	24.36
Republican	Martha Elena Fierro	3,505	23.14
Democratic	Mia Mundy	322	2.13
Majority		4,124	27.23
Turnout		15,146	
Democratic hold			

=== 2016 ===
Change with 2012.

Texas general election, 2016: Senate District 6
Party	Candidate	Votes	%	±%
Democratic	Sylvia Garcia	119,891	100.00	+29.05
Majority		119,891	100.00	+58.10
Turnout		119,891		
Democratic hold				

=== 2013 (special) ===
2013 Texas Senate District 6 special runoff election - 3 February 2013
Party	Candidate	Votes	%	±%
Democratic	Sylvia Garcia	9,595	52.89	+7.54
Democratic	Carol Alvarado	8,546	47.11	+5.49
Majority		1,049	5.78	
Turnout		18,141		
Democratic hold				

2013 Texas Senate District 6 special election - 26 January 2013
Party	Candidate	Votes	%
Democratic	Sylvia Garcia	7,424	45.35
Democratic	Carol Alvarado	6,813	41.62
Republican	R. W. Bray	1,015	6.20
Republican	Dorothy Olmos	461	2.82
Democratic	Joaquin Martinez	405	2.47
Independent	Rodolfo "Rudy" Reyes	125	0.76
Green	Maria Selva	73	0.45
Democratic	Susan Delgado	53	0.32
Turnout		16,369	

=== 2012 ===
Texas general election, 2012: Senate District 6
Party	Candidate	Votes	%	±%
Democratic	Mario Gallegos Jr.	93,289	70.95	+0.94
Republican	R. W. Bray	38,201	29.05	+2.42
Majority		55,088	41.90	−1.48
Turnout		131,490		
Democratic hold				

=== 2008 ===
Texas general election, 2008: Senate District 6
Party	Candidate	Votes	%	±%
Democratic	Mario Gallegos Jr.	72,960	70.01	−21.73
Republican	Gilbert Pena	27,751	26.63	+26.63
Libertarian	Susan Delgado	3,496	3.35	−4.70
Majority		45,209	43.38	−40.31
Turnout		104,207		
Democratic hold				

=== 2004 ===
Texas general election, 2004: Senate District 6
Party	Candidate	Votes	%	±%
Democratic	Mario Gallegos Jr.	75,318	91.74	−8.24
Libertarian	Tony Deppenschmidt	6,614	8.05	+8.05
Write-In	Susan Delgado	160	0.19	+0.19
Majority		68,704	83.69	−16.31
Turnout		82,092		+51.65
Democratic hold				

Democratic primary, 2004: Senate District 6
Candidate		Votes	%	±
✓	Mario V. Gallegos, Jr.	6,484	53.92	
	Yolanda Navarro Flores	5,541	46.07	
Turnout		12,025		

=== 2002 ===
Texas general election, 2002: Senate District 6
Party	Candidate	Votes	%	±%
Democratic	Mario Gallegos, Jr.	54,130	100.00	0.00
Majority		54,130	100.00	+43.41
Turnout		54,130		+43.41
Democratic hold				

=== 1998 ===
Texas general election, 1998: Senate District 6
Party	Candidate	Votes	%	±%
Democratic	Mario Gallegos, Jr.	37,746	100.00	0.00
Majority		37,746	100.00	−2.59
Turnout		37,746		−2.59
Democratic hold				

=== 1994 ===
Texas general election, 1994: Senate District 6
Party	Candidate	Votes	%	±%
Democratic	Mario Gallegos, Jr.	38,749	100.00	+57.52
Majority		38,749	100.00	+69.20
Turnout		38,749		−74.55
Democratic gain from Republican				

Democratic primary runoff, 1994: Senate District 6
Candidate		Votes	%	±
✓	Mario V. Gallegos, Jr.	9,613	57.19	
	Roman O. Martinez	7,193	42.80	
Turnout		16,806		

Democratic primary, 1994: Senate District 6
Candidate		Votes	%	±
✓	Roman O. Martinez	9,026	37.91	
✓	Mario V. Gallegos, Jr.	5,990	25.15	
	Yolanda Navarro Flores	4,936	20.73	
	David Thomas McCullough	3,857	16.19	
Turnout		23,809		

=== 1992 ===
Texas general election, 1992: Senate District 6
Party	Candidate	Votes	%	±%
Republican	Dan Shelley	87,570	57.52	
Democratic	Don Coffey	64,669	42.48	
Majority		22,901	15.04	
Turnout		152,239		
Republican gain from Democratic				

== District officeholders ==
Legislature	Senator, District 6	Counties in District
1	Jesse J. Robinson	Jasper, Sabine.
2	John H. McRae	Jasper, Newton, Sabine.
3	James F. Taylor	Harrison, Smith, Upshur.
4	George Washington Hill	Henderson, Limestone, Navarro.
5	Simpson C. Newman	Upshur, Wood.
6	Jonathan Russell	Upshur, Wood.
7	Jonathan Russell	Upshur, Wood.
8	Emory Rains	Upshur, Wood.
9	Matthew Fielding Locke; Stephen W. Beasley	Harrison, Upshur.
10	Stephen W. Beasley	Harrison, Upshur.
11	C. C. Coppedge	Harrison, Upshur.
12	James Postell Douglas	Smith, Upshur.
13	John Lane Henry	Smith, Upshur.
14	John Lafayette Camp	Smith, Upshur.
15	William Amos Wortham	Franklin, Hopkins, Red River, Titus.
16	William Jesse Swain	Franklin, Hopkins, Red River, Titus.
17	William Jesse Swain	Franklin, Hopkins, Red River, Titus.
18	John C. Buchanan	Gregg, Rains, Smith, Upshur, Wood.
19	John Lafayette Camp, Jr.	Gregg, Rains, Smith, Upshur, Wood.
20	John Lafayette Camp, Jr.	Gregg, Rains, Smith, Upshur, Wood.
21	William C. "Cone" Johnson	Gregg, Rains, Smith, Upshur, Wood.
22	William C. "Cone" Johnson	Gregg, Rains, Smith, Upshur, Wood.
23	Oliver P. Bowser	Dallas, Rockwall.
24	Oliver P. Bowser	Dallas, Rockwall.
25	Oliver P. Bowser	Dallas, Rockwall.
26	Barry Miller	Dallas, Rockwall.
27	Barry Miller	Dallas, Rockwall.
28	William C. McKamy, Jr.	Dallas, Rockwall.
29	William C. McKamy, Jr.	Dallas, Rockwall.
30	Erasmus G. Senter	Dallas, Rockwall.
31	Erasmus G. Senter	Dallas, Rockwall.
32	James C. McNealus	Dallas, Rockwall.
33	James C. McNealus	Dallas, Rockwall.
34	James C. McNealus	Dallas, Rockwall.
35	James C. McNealus	Dallas, Rockwall.
36	James C. McNealus	Dallas, Rockwall.
37	James C. McNealus; Hart Willis	Dallas, Rockwall.
38	John Davis	Dallas, Rockwall.
39	J. Roy Hardin	Anderson, Freestone, Henderson, Kaufman, Navarro.
40	Julian P. Greer	Anderson, Freestone, Henderson, Kaufman, Navarro.
41	Julian P. Greer	Anderson, Freestone, Henderson, Kaufman, Navarro.
42	Julian P. Greer	Anderson, Freestone, Henderson, Kaufman, Navarro.
43	Julian P. Greer	Anderson, Freestone, Henderson, Kaufman, Navarro.
44	Clay Cotten	Anderson, Freestone, Henderson, Kaufman, Navarro.
45	Clay Cotten	Anderson, Freestone, Henderson, Kaufman, Navarro.
46	Clay Cotten	Anderson, Freestone, Henderson, Kaufman, Navarro.
47	Clay Cotten	Anderson, Freestone, Henderson, Kaufman, Navarro.
48	Clay Cotten; James E. Taylor	Anderson, Freestone, Henderson, Kaufman, Navarro.
49	James E. Taylor	Anderson, Freestone, Henderson, Kaufman, Navarro.
50	James E. Taylor	Anderson, Freestone, Henderson, Kaufman, Navarro.
51	James E. Taylor; George O. Nokes, Jr.	Anderson, Freestone, Henderson, Kaufman, Navarro.
52	George O. Nokes, Jr.	Anderson, Freestone, Henderson, Kaufman, Navarro.
53	J. Searcy Bracewell, Jr.	Harris.
54	J. Searcy Bracewell, Jr.	Harris.
55	J. Searcy Bracewell, Jr.	Harris.
56	Robert W. Baker	Harris.
57	Robert W. Baker	Harris.
58	Criss Cole	Harris.
59	Criss Cole	Harris.
60	Criss Cole	Portion of Harris.
61	Criss Cole	Portion of Harris.
62	James P. Wallace	Portion of Harris.
63	James P. Wallace	Portion of Harris.
64	Lindon Williams	Portion of Harris.
65	Lindon Williams	Portion of Harris.
66	Lindon Williams	Portion of Harris.
67	Lindon Williams	Portion of Harris.
68	Lindon Williams	Portion of Harris.
69	Lindon Williams	Portion of Harris.
70	Gene Green	Portion of Harris.
71	Gene Green	Portion of Harris.
72	Gene Green	Portion of Harris.
73	Dan Shelley	Portion of Harris.
74	Mario Gallegos, Jr.	Portion of Harris.
75	Mario Gallegos, Jr.	Portion of Harris.
76	Mario Gallegos, Jr.	Portion of Harris.
77	Mario Gallegos, Jr.	Portion of Harris.
78	Mario Gallegos, Jr.	Portion of Harris.
79	Mario Gallegos, Jr.	Portion of Harris.
80	Mario Gallegos, Jr.	Portion of Harris.
81	Mario Gallegos, Jr.	Portion of Harris.
82	Mario Gallegos, Jr.	Portion of Harris.
83	Mario Gallegos, Jr. Sylvia Garcia	Portion of Harris.
84	Sylvia Garcia	Portion of Harris.
85	Sylvia Garcia; Carol Alvarado	Portion of Harris.
86	Carol Alvarado	Portion of Harris.
87	Carol Alvarado	Portion of Harris.
88	Carol Alvarado	Portion of Harris.
89	Carol Alvarado	Portion of Harris.
