= Texas's 20th Senate district =

American legislative district

Texas's 20th State Senate district
Senator
Juan "Chuy" Hinojosa; D–McAllen
- Demographics: 16.3% White; 2.2% Black; 79.7% Hispanic; 1.9% Asian
- Population: 900,121

District 20 of the Texas Senate is a senatorial district that currently serves all of Brooks, Jim Wells counties and portions of Hidalgo and Nueces counties in the U.S. state of Texas.

The current senator from District 20 is Juan "Chuy" Hinojosa.

== Biggest cities in the district ==
District 20 has a population of 833,339 with 577,960 that is at voting age from the 2010 census.

	Name	County	Pop. (Note: Population is based on the number of people in the district in that city, not the overall population of that city)
1	Corpus Christi	Nueces	305,110
2	McAllen	Hidalgo	116,299
3	Edinburg	Hidalgo	77,100
4	Mission	Hidalgo	77,058
5	Alice	Jim Wells	19,104

== Election history ==
Election history of District 20 from 1992. (Note: Uncontested primary elections are not shown.)

=== 2024 ===
Texas general election, 2024: Senate District 20
Party	Candidate	Votes	%	±%
Democratic	Juan "Chuy" Hinojosa (Incumbent)	178,987	100.00	+40.82
Majority		178,987	100.00	+81.64
Turnout		178,987		
Democratic hold				

=== 2022 ===
Texas general election, 2022: Senate District 20
Party	Candidate	Votes	%	±%
Democratic	Juan "Chuy" Hinojosa (Incumbent)	102,280	59.18	+0.70
Republican	Wesley Wright	70,536	40.82	−0.70
Majority		31,744	18.36	+1.40
Turnout		172,816		
Democratic hold				

=== 2020 ===
Texas general election, 2020: Senate District 20
Party	Candidate	Votes	%	±%
Democratic	Juan "Chuy" Hinojosa (Incumbent)	154,311	58.48	−3.20
Republican	Judith Cutright	109,563	41.52	+3.20
Majority		44,748	16.96	−6.40
Turnout		263,874		
Democratic hold				

=== 2016 ===
Texas general election, 2016: Senate District 20
Party	Candidate	Votes	%	±%
Democratic	Juan "Chuy" Hinojosa (Incumbent)	132,128	61.68	+0.15
Republican	Velma A. Arellano	82,098	38.32	−0.15
Majority		50,030	23.36	+0.30
Turnout		214,226		
Democratic hold				

=== 2012 ===
Texas general election, 2012: Senate District 20
Party	Candidate	Votes	%	±%
Democratic	Juan "Chuy" Hinojosa (Incumbent)	112,629	61.53	−19.87
Republican	Raul Torres	70,409	38.47	+38.47
Majority		42,220	23.06	−39.74
Turnout		183,038		
Democratic hold				

=== 2008 ===
Texas general election, 2008: Senate District 20
Party	Candidate	Votes	%	±%
Democratic	Juan "Chuy" Hinojosa (Incumbent)	124,456	81.40	−18.60
Libertarian	Bill Parker	28,429	18.60	+18.60
Majority		96,027	62.80	−37.20
Turnout		152,885		
Democratic hold				

=== 2004 ===
Texas general election, 2004: Senate District 20
Party	Candidate	Votes	%	±%
Democratic	Juan "Chuy" Hinojosa (Incumbent)	116,723	100.00	0.00
Majority		116,723	100.00	0.00
Turnout		116,723		+48.34
Democratic hold				

=== 2002 ===
Texas general election, 2002: Senate District 20
Party	Candidate	Votes	%	±%
Democratic	Juan "Chuy" Hinojosa	78,685	100.00	+41.91
Majority		78,685	100.00	+83.82
Turnout		78,685		−20.23
Democratic hold				

Democratic primary runoff, 2002: Senate District 20
Candidate		Votes	%	±
	Barbara Canales-Black	27,068	44.53	+5.47
✓	Juan "Chuy" Hinojosa	33,716	55.47	+12.45
Majority		6,648	10.94	
Turnout		60,784		

Democratic primary, 2002: Senate District 20
Candidate		Votes	%	±
✓	Barbara Canales-Black	25,922	39.07	
	Ruben M. Garcia	4,266	6.43	
✓	Juan "Chuy" Hinojosa	28,543	43.02	
	Diana Martinez	7,624	11.49	
Turnout		66,355		

=== 1998 ===
Texas general election, 1998: Senate District 20
Party	Candidate	Votes	%	±%
Democratic	Carlos F. Truan (Incumbent)	57,298	58.09	−0.35
Republican	Joe Gardner (politician)	41,338	41.91	+0.35
Majority		15,960	16.18	−0.71
Turnout		98,636		−14.04
Democratic hold				

=== 1994 ===
Texas general election, 1994: Senate District 20
Party	Candidate	Votes	%	±%
Democratic	Carlos F. Truan (Incumbent)	67,066	58.44	−41.56
Republican	Rex Moses	47,656	41.56	+41.56
Majority		19,380	16.89	−83.11
Turnout		114,752		+12.06
Democratic hold				

=== 1992 ===
Texas general election, 1992: Senate District 20
Party	Candidate	Votes	%	±%
Democratic	Carlos F. Truan (Incumbent)	102,405	100.00	
Majority		102,405	100.00	
Turnout		102,405		
Democratic hold				

Democratic primary, 1992: Senate District 20
Candidate		Votes	%	±
	Mark Crawford	24,538	35.83	
✓	Carlos F. Truan (Incumbent)	43,952	64.17	
Majority		19,414	28.35	
Turnout		68,490		

== District officeholders ==
Legislature	Senator, District 20	Counties in District
3	David C. Van Derlip	Bexar, Comal, Gillespie, Guadalupe, Medina, Santa Fé.
4	John Winfield Scott Dancy	Bastrop, Caldwell, Fayette.
5	James W. McDade	Washington.
6	James W. McDade	Washington.
7	Chauncey Berkeley Shepard	Washington.
8	Chauncey Berkeley Shepard	Washington.
9	Alfred T. Obenchain; William Quayle	Erath, Johnson, Palo Pinto, Parker, Tarrant.
10	William Quayle	Erath, Johnson, Palo Pinto, Parker, Tarrant.
11	William R. Shannon	Erath, Johnson, Palo Pinto, Parker, Tarrant.
12	William H. Pyle	Ellis, Hill, Kaufman, Navarro.
13	William H. Pyle	Ellis, Hill, Kaufman, Navarro.
14	Amzi Bradshaw	Dallas, Ellis, Tarrant.
15	John W. Carroll	Austin, Burleson, Washington.
16	William Kercheval Homan	Austin, Burleson, Washington.
17	William Kercheval Homan	Austin, Burleson, Washington.
18	William R. Shannon	Jack, Parker, Tarrant, Wise.
19	William R. Shannon	Jack, Parker, Tarrant, Wise.
20	James Jones Jarvis	Jack, Parker, Tarrant, Wise.
21	James Jones Jarvis	Jack, Parker, Tarrant, Wise.
22	Augustus M. Carter	Jack, Parker, Tarrant, Wise.
23	Walter Tips	Burnet, Travis, Williamson.
24	Walter Tips	Burnet, Travis, Williamson.
25	William D. Yett	Burnet, Travis, Williamson.
26	William D. Yett	Burnet, Travis, Williamson.
27	William D. Yett	Burnet, Travis, Williamson.
28	James H. Faubion	Burnet, Lampasas, Travis, Williamson.
29	George Washington Glasscock, Jr.	Burnet, Lampasas, Travis, Williamson.
30	George Washington Glasscock, Jr.	Burnet, Lampasas, Travis, Williamson.
31	John L. Peeler	Burnet, Lampasas, Travis, Williamson.
32	John L. Peeler	Burnet, Lampasas, Travis, Williamson.
33	Temple H. McGregor	Burnet, Lampasas, Travis, Williamson.
34	Robert J. Eckhardt; Temple H. McGregor	Burnet, Lampasas, Travis, Williamson.
35	Walter D. Caldwell	Burnet, Lampasas, Travis, Williamson.
36	Walter D. Caldwell	Burnet, Lampasas, Travis, Williamson.
37	Ashley E. Wood	Burnet, Lampasas, Travis, Williamson.
38	Ashley E. Wood	Burnet, Lampasas, Travis, Williamson.
39	Ashley E. Wood	Burnet, Lampasas, Llano, San Saba, Travis, Williamson.
40	Ashley E. Wood	Burnet, Lampasas, Llano, San Saba, Travis, Williamson.
41	John W. Hornsby	Burnet, Lampasas, Llano, San Saba, Travis, Williamson.
42	John W. Hornsby	Burnet, Lampasas, Llano, San Saba, Travis, Williamson.
43	John W. Hornsby	Burnet, Lampasas, Llano, San Saba, Travis, Williamson.
44	John W. Hornsby	Burnet, Lampasas, Llano, San Saba, Travis, Williamson.
45	Houghton Brownlee	Burnet, Lampasas, Llano, San Saba, Travis, Williamson.
46	Houghton Brownlee	Burnet, Lampasas, Llano, San Saba, Travis, Williamson.
47	Houghton Brownlee	Burnet, Lampasas, Llano, San Saba, Travis, Williamson.
48	Houghton Brownlee	Burnet, Lampasas, Llano, San Saba, Travis, Williamson.
49	James A. Stanford	Burnet, Lampasas, Llano, San Saba, Travis, Williamson.
50	James A. Stanford	Burnet, Lampasas, Llano, San Saba, Travis, Williamson.
51	Carlos C. Ashley, Sr.	Burnet, Lampasas, Llano, San Saba, Travis, Williamson.
52	Carlos C. Ashley, Sr.	Burnet, Lampasas, Llano, San Saba, Travis, Williamson.
53	William H. Shireman	Kenedy, Kleberg, Nueces, Willacy.
54	William H. Shireman	Kenedy, Kleberg, Nueces, Willacy.
55	Bruce Reagan	Kenedy, Kleberg, Nueces, Willacy.
56	Bruce Reagan	Kenedy, Kleberg, Nueces, Willacy.
57	Bruce Reagan	Kenedy, Kleberg, Nueces, Willacy.
58	Bruce Reagan	Kenedy, Kleberg, Nueces, Willacy.
59	Bruce Reagan	Kenedy, Kleberg, Nueces, Willacy.
60	Bruce Reagan	All of Kenedy, Kleberg, Nueces, Willacy. Portion of Cameron.
61	Ronald W. Bridges	All of Kenedy, Kleberg, Nueces, Willacy. Portion of Cameron.
62	Ronald W. Bridges	All of Kenedy, Kleberg, Nueces, Willacy. Portion of Cameron.
63	Mike McKinnon	Bee, Kenedy, Kleberg, Nueces, Refugio, San Patricio, Willacy.
64	Mike McKinnon	Bee, Kenedy, Kleberg, Nueces, Refugio, San Patricio, Willacy.
65	Carlos F. Truan	Bee, Kenedy, Kleberg, Nueces, Refugio, San Patricio, Willacy.
66	Carlos F. Truan	Bee, Kenedy, Kleberg, Nueces, Refugio, San Patricio, Willacy.
67	Carlos F. Truan	Bee, Kenedy, Kleberg, Nueces, Refugio, San Patricio, Willacy.
68	Carlos F. Truan	All of Brooks, Jim Wells, Kenedy, Kleberg, Nueces, San Patricio, Willacy. Portion of Hidalgo.
69	Carlos F. Truan	All of Brooks, Jim Wells, Kenedy, Kleberg, Nueces, San Patricio, Willacy. Portion of Hidalgo.
70	Carlos F. Truan	All of Brooks, Jim Wells, Kenedy, Kleberg, Nueces, San Patricio, Willacy. Portion of Hidalgo.
71	Carlos F. Truan	All of Brooks, Jim Wells, Kenedy, Kleberg, Nueces, San Patricio, Willacy. Portion of Hidalgo.
72	Carlos F. Truan	All of Brooks, Jim Wells, Kenedy, Kleberg, Nueces, San Patricio, Willacy. Portion of Hidalgo.
73	Carlos F. Truan	All of Brooks, Jim Wells, Kenedy, Kleberg, Nueces, San Patricio, Willacy. Portion of Hidalgo.
74	Carlos F. Truan	All of Brooks, Jim Wells, Kenedy, Kleberg, Nueces, San Patricio, Willacy. Portion of Hidalgo.
75	Carlos F. Truan	All of Brooks, Jim Wells, Kenedy, Kleberg, Nueces, San Patricio, Willacy. Portion of Hidalgo.
76	Carlos F. Truan	All of Brooks, Jim Wells, Kenedy, Kleberg, Nueces, San Patricio, Willacy. Portion of Hidalgo.
77	Carlos F. Truan	All of Brooks, Jim Wells, Kenedy, Kleberg, Nueces, San Patricio, Willacy. Portion of Hidalgo.
78	Juan "Chuy" Hinojosa	All of Brooks, Jim Wells, Nueces. Portion of Hidalgo.
79	Juan "Chuy" Hinojosa	All of Brooks, Jim Wells, Nueces. Portion of Hidalgo.
80	Juan "Chuy" Hinojosa	All of Brooks, Jim Wells, Nueces. Portion of Hidalgo.
81	Juan "Chuy" Hinojosa	All of Brooks, Jim Wells, Nueces. Portion of Hidalgo.
82	Juan "Chuy" Hinojosa	All of Brooks, Jim Wells, Nueces. Portion of Hidalgo.
83	Juan "Chuy" Hinojosa	All of Brooks, Jim Wells. Portions of Hidalgo and Nueces.
84	Juan "Chuy" Hinojosa	All of Brooks, Jim Wells. Portions of Hidalgo and Nueces.
85	Juan "Chuy" Hinojosa	All of Brooks, Jim Wells. Portions of Hidalgo and Nueces.
86	Juan "Chuy" Hinojosa	All of Brooks, Jim Wells. Portions of Hidalgo and Nueces.
87	Juan "Chuy" Hinojosa	All of Brooks, Jim Wells. Portions of Hidalgo and Nueces.
88	Juan "Chuy" Hinojosa	All of Brooks, Jim Wells. Portions of Hidalgo and Nueces.
89	Juan "Chuy" Hinojosa	All of Brooks, Jim Wells. Portions of Hidalgo and Nueces.
