= 5th Texas Legislature =

The 5th Texas Legislature met from November 7, 1853, to February 13, 1854, in its regular session. All members of the House of Representatives and about half of the members of the Senate were elected in 1853.

== Sessions ==
- 5th Regular session: November 7, 1853 – February 13, 1854

== Officers ==
=== Senate ===
Lieutenant Governor
David Catchings Dickson, Democrat
President pro tempore
M. D. K. Taylor, Democrat, Regular session
Guy Morrison Bryan, Democrat, Regular session

=== House of Representatives ===
Speaker of the House
Hardin Richard Runnels, Democrat

== Members ==
=== Senate ===
Members of the Texas Senate for the Fifth Texas Legislature:

District	Senator	Party	Took office
1	Joseph H. Burks	Democrat	1851
2	Johnson Wren	Democrat	1853
3	Hart Hardin	Democrat	1853
4	Malachi W. Allen	Democrat	1853
5	Jefferson Weatherford	Democrat	1853
6	Simpson C. Newman	Democrat	1853
7	M. D. K. Taylor	Democrat	1851
8	William Thomas Scott	Democrat	1851 (First time:1846–1847)
9	David Gage	Democrat	1853
10	Elisha Everett Lott	Democrat	1853
11	Robert Henry Guinn	Democrat	1853
12	William G. W. Jowers	Democrat	1853
13	Madison G. Whitaker	Democrat	1853
14	James K. Holland	Democrat	1853
15	William C. Edwards	Democrat	1853
16	Henry C. Pedigo	Democrat	1853
17	Mark M. Potter	Democrat	1851
18	Cornelius McAnelly	Democrat	1853
19	Charles G. Keenan	Democrat	1853
20	James W. McDade	Democrat	1853
21	Elliot McNeil Millican	Democrat	1853
22	William Harrison "Howdy" Martin	Democrat	1853
23	James H. Armstrong	Democrat	1851
24	Guy Morrison Bryan	Democrat	1853
25	Henry Williams Sublett	Democrat	1853
26	James T. Lytle	Democrat	1853
27	Claiborne Kyle	Democrat	1853
28	Edwin B. Scarborough	Democrat	1853
29	James H. Durst	Democrat	1853
30	Antoine Supervièle	Democrat	1853
31	Isaiah Addison Paschal	Democrat	1853
32	Isaac Lafayette Hill	Democrat	1853
33	Rufus Doane	Democrat	1851

=== House of Representatives ===
Members of the House of Representatives for the Fifth Texas Legislature. There are 73 districts at this time, 16 of them just created this session:

- John David German Adrian
- Hamilton P. Bee
- William H. Bourland, Democrat
- George E. Burney
- Horace Cone
- David Catchings Dickson, Democrat
- Benjamin Cromwell Franklin
- Lindsay Hagler, San Patricio County
- Bird Holland
- John Byler Mallard
- Samuel A. Maverick, Democrat,
- William Menefee
- Emory Rains
- James Reily
- Hardin Richard Runnels, Democrat
- Moses Fisk Roberts
- Gustav Schleicher
- Charles William Tait
- Robert H. Taylor
- Amasa Turner
- George Washington Whitmore
- Wesley Clark Walker, Democrat

== Membership changes ==
=== Senate ===
District	Outgoing Senator	Reason for Vacancy	Successor	Date of Successor's Installation
District 26	James T. Lytle	Senator Lytle died February 5, 1854	None	
