= Texas's 12th Senate district =

American legislative district

Texas's 12th State Senate district
Senator
| Tan Parker; R–Flower Mound |
- Demographics: 59.8% White; 10.3% Black; 21.1% Hispanic; 8.5% Asian
- Population: 983,996

District 12 of the Texas Senate is a senatorial district that currently serves all of Wise County, and portions of Dallas, Denton and Tarrant counties in the U.S. state of Texas.

The current senator from District 12 is Tan Parker.

== Biggest cities in the district ==
District 12 has a population of 818,893 with 588,816 that is at voting age from the 2010 census.

| | Name | County | Pop. (Note: Population is based on the number of people in the district in that city, not the overall population of that city.) |
|---|---|---|---|
| 1 | Fort Worth | Tarrant | 137,584 |
| 2 | Lewisville | Denton | 94,449 |
| 3 | Carrollton | Denton | 69,743 |
| 4 | Flower Mound | Denton/Tarrant | 64,669 |
| 5 | Frisco | Denton | 44,500 |

== District officeholders ==
| Name | | Party | Years | Legislature | Counties served |
|---|---|---|---|---|---|
| 1 | John McNeel | | February 16, 1846 – December 13, 1847 | 1st | Brazoria, Matagorda |
| 2 | Stephen W. Perkins | | December 13, 1847 – November 5, 1849 | 2nd | Brazoria, Matagorda |
| 3 | Isaac W. Brashear | | November 5, 1849 – November 3, 1851 | 3rd | Harris |
| 4 | James A. Truitt | | November 3, 1851 – November 7, 1853 | 4th | Panola, Shelby |
| 5 | William G. W. Jowers | | November 7, 1853 – November 5, 1855 | 5th | Anderson, Houston |
| 6 | William M. Taylor | | November 5, 1855 – November 7, 1859 | 6th 7th | Anderson, Houston |
| 7 | Alexis T. Rainey | | November 7, 1859 – February 13, 1860 | 8th | Anderson, Houston |
| 8 | Steward Alexander Miller | | January 21, 1861 – November 4, 1861 | 8th | Anderson, Houston |
| 9 | Benjamin T. Selman | | November 4, 1861 – February 7, 1870 | 9th 10th 11th | Smith, Van Zandt, Wood |
| 10 | George Ruby | Republican | February 8, 1870 – January 13, 1874 | 12th 13th | Brazoria, Galveston, Matagorda |
| | Benjamin Cromwell Franklin | Democratic | Elected but never sworn | 14th | Brazoria, Galveston, Matagorda |
| 11 | Thomas Miller Joseph | Democratic | March 19, 1874 – April 18, 1876 | 14th | Brazoria, Galveston, Matagorda |
| 12 | Finis E. Piner | Democratic | April 18, 1876 – January 14, 1879 | 15th | Collin, Denton |
| 13 | William D. Lair | Democratic | January 14, 1879 – January 9, 1883 | 16th 17th | Collin, Denton |
| 14 | Alvah Chesley | Democratic | January 9, 1883 – January 13, 1885 | 18th | Austin, Burleson, Fort Bend, Waller, Washington |
| 15 | Hermann Knittel | Democratic | January 13, 1885 – January 8, 1889 | 19th 20th | Austin, Burleson, Fort Bend, Waller, Washington |
| 16 | Ernst Gustav Maetze | Democratic | January 8, 1889 – October 12, 1891 | 21st 22nd | Austin, Burleson, Fort Bend, Waller, Washington |
| 17 | William W. Searcy | Democratic | March 14, 1892 – January 10, 1893 | 22nd | Austin, Burleson, Fort Bend, Waller, Washington |
| 18 | Robert E. Steele | Democratic | January 10, 1893 – January 12, 1897 | 23rd 24th | Brazos, Freestone, Limestone, Robertson |
| 19 | John A. Wayland | Democratic | January 12, 1897 – January 13, 1903 | 25th 26th 27th | Brazos, Freestone, Limestone, Robertson |
| 20 | Alfred J. Harper | Democratic | January 13, 1903 – September 17, 1910 | 28th 29th 30th 31st | Brazos, Freestone, Limestone, Robertson |
| 21 | James R. Astin | Democratic | January 10, 1911 – January 9, 1917 | 32nd 33rd 30th 34th | Brazos, Freestone, Limestone, Robertson |
| 22 | Edmond A. Decherd, Jr. | Democratic | January 9, 1917 – April 16, 1918 | 35th | Brazos, Freestone, Limestone, Robertson |
| 23 | Robert L. Williford | Democratic | January 14, 1919 – January 11, 1921 | 36th | Brazos, Freestone, Limestone, Robertson |
| 24 | D. Leon Harp | Democratic | March 12, 1921 – January 9, 1923 | 37th | Brazos, Freestone, Limestone, Robertson |
| 25 | William E. Doyle | Democratic | July 18, 1921 – January 13, 1925 | 37th 38th | Brazos, Freestone, Limestone, Robertson |
| 26 | Pierce B. Ward | Democratic | January 13, 1925 – January 8, 1929 | 39th 40th | Ellis, Hill, Hood, Johnson, Somervell |
| 27 | Will M. Martin | Democratic | January 8, 1929 – January 12, 1937 | 41st 42nd 43rd 44th | Ellis, Hill, Hood, Johnson, Somervell |
| 28 | Vernon Lemens | Democratic | January 12, 1937 – January 9, 1945 | 45th 46th 47th 48th | Ellis, Hill, Hood, Johnson, Somervell |
| 29 | A. B. Crawford | Democratic | January 9, 1945 – January 11, 1949 | 49th 50th | Ellis, Hill, Hood, Johnson, Somervell |
| 30 | Crawford Martin | Democratic | January 11, 1949 – January 13, 1953 | 51st 52nd | Ellis, Hill, Hood, Johnson, Somervell |
| 30 | Crawford Martin | Democratic | January 13, 1953 – January 8, 1963 | 53rd 54th 55th 56th 57th | Bosque, Comanche, Coryell, Ellis, Erath, Hamilton, Hill, Hood, Johnson, Somervell |
| 31 | J. P. Word | Democratic | January 8, 1963 – January 10, 1967 | 58th 59th | Bosque, Comanche, Coryell, Ellis, Erath, Hamilton, Hill, Hood, Johnson, Somervell |
| 31 | J. P. Word | Democratic | January 10, 1967 – January 9, 1973 | 60th 61st 62nd | Bandera, Bosque, Brown, Burnet, Comal, Comanche, Concho, Coryell, Ellis, Erath, Gillespie, Hamilton, Hill, Hood, Johnson, Kendall, Kerr, Kimble, Lampasas, Llano, Mason, McCulloch, Menard, Mills, Real, San Saba, Somervell |
| 32 | Betty Andujar | Republican | January 9, 1973 – January 11, 1983 | 63rd 64th 65th 66th 67th | Tarrant |
| 33 | Hugh Q. Parmer | Democratic | January 11, 1983 – January 8, 1991 | 68th 69th 70th 71st | Tarrant |
| 34 | Mike Moncrief | Democratic | January 8, 1991 – January 12, 1993 | 72nd | Tarrant |
| 34 | Mike Moncrief | Democratic | January 12, 1993 – January 10, 1995 | 73rd | Dallas, Tarrant |
| 34 | Mike Moncrief | Democratic | January 10, 1995 – January 14, 2003 | 74th 75th 76th 77th | Tarrant |
| 35 | Jane Nelson | Republican | January 14, 2003 – January 3, 2023 | 78th 79th 80th 81st 82nd 83rd 84th 85th 86th 87th | Denton, Tarrant |
| 36 | Tan Parker | Republican | January 10, 2023 – present | 88th 89th | Dallas, Denton, Tarrant, Wise |

== Election history ==
=== 2024 ===
Texas general election, 2024: Senate District 12
| Party | Candidate | Votes | % | ±% |
|---|---|---|---|---|
| Republican | Tan Parker (Incumbent) | 277,734 | 61.36 | −0.08 |
| Democratic | Stephanie Draper | 174,875 | 38.64 | +0.08 |
| Majority | | 102,859 | 22.72 | −0.16 |
| Turnout | | 452,609 | | |
| Republican hold | | Swing | | |

=== 2022 ===
Texas general election, 2022: Senate District 12
| Party | Candidate | Votes | % | ±% |
|---|---|---|---|---|
| Republican | Tan Parker | 213,018 | 61.44 | −0.85 |
| Democratic | Francine Ly | 133,679 | 38.56 | +0.94 |
| Majority | | 79,399 | 22.88 | −1.70 |
| Turnout | | 346,697 | | −35.86 |
| Republican hold | | | | |

=== 2020 ===
Texas general election, 2020: Senate District 12
| Party | Candidate | Votes | % | ±% |
|---|---|---|---|---|
| Republican | Jane Nelson (Incumbent) | 293,399 | 62.29 | −20.69 |
| Democratic | Shadi Zitoon | 177,610 | 37.71 | +37.71 |
| Majority | | 115,789 | 24.58 | −41.38 |
| Turnout | | 471,009 | | +62.03 |
| Republican hold | | | | |

=== 2016 ===
Texas general election, 2016: Senate District 12
| Party | Candidate | Votes | % | ±% |
|---|---|---|---|---|
| Republican | Jane Nelson (Incumbent) | 241,232 | 82.98 | −0.43 |
| Libertarian | Rod Wingo | 49,465 | 17.02 | +0.43 |
| Majority | | 191,767 | 65.96 | −0.86 |
| Turnout | | 290,697 | | +18.86 |
| Republican hold | | | | |

=== 2012 ===
Texas general election, 2012: Senate District 12
| Party | Candidate | Votes | % | ±% |
|---|---|---|---|---|
| Republican | Jane Nelson (Incumbent) | 203,988 | 83.41 | −2.74 |
| Libertarian | John A. Betz, Jr. | 40,570 | 16.59 | +2.74 |
| Majority | | 163,418 | 66.82 | −5.48 |
| Turnout | | 244,558 | | +41.78 |
| Republican hold | | | | |

=== 2010 ===
Texas general election, 2010: Senate District 12
| Party | Candidate | Votes | % | ±% |
|---|---|---|---|---|
| Republican | Jane Nelson (Incumbent) | 148,592 | 86.15 | +22.17 |
| Libertarian | Mark F. Frohman | 23,894 | 13.85 | +10.19 |
| Majority | | 124,698 | 72.30 | +40.67 |
| Turnout | | 172,486 | | +0.77 |
| Republican hold | | | | |

=== 2006 ===
Texas general election, 2006: Senate District 12
| Party | Candidate | Votes | % | ±% |
|---|---|---|---|---|
| Republican | Jane Nelson (Incumbent) | 109,513 | 63.98 | −25.84 |
| Democratic | Dwight B. Fullingham | 55,380 | 32.35 | +32.35 |
| Libertarian | Morgan Ware | 6,273 | 3.66 | −6.51 |
| Majority | | 54,133 | 31.63 | −48.02 |
| Turnout | | 171,166 | | +26.03 |
| Republican hold | | | | |

=== 2002 ===
Texas general election, 2002: Senate District 12
| Party | Candidate | Votes | % | ±% |
|---|---|---|---|---|
| Republican | Jane Nelson (Incumbent) | 121,991 | 89.83 | +53.49 |
| Libertarian | Steve Rushton | 13,818 | 10.17 | +10.17 |
| Majority | | 108,173 | 79.65 | +52.33 |
| Turnout | | 135,809 | | −20.20 |
| Republican gain from Democratic | | | | |

=== 2000 ===
Texas general election, 2000: Senate District 12
| Party | Candidate | Votes | % | ±% |
|---|---|---|---|---|
| Republican | George Host | 61,846 | 36.34 | +36.34 |
| Democratic | Mike Moncrief (Incumbent) | 108,349 | 63.66 | −36.34 |
| Majority | | 46,503 | 27.32 | −72.68 |
| Turnout | | 170,195 | | +50.97 |
| Democratic hold | | | | |

=== 1996 ===
Texas general election, 1996: Senate District 12
| Party | Candidate | Votes | % | ±% |
|---|---|---|---|---|
| Democratic | Mike Moncrief (Incumbent) | 112,733 | 100.00 | 0.00 |
| Majority | | 112,733 | 100.00 | 0.00 |
| Turnout | | 112,733 | | +19.03 |
| Democratic hold | | | | |

Democratic primary, 1996: Senate District 12
| Candidate | | Votes | % | ± |
|---|---|---|---|---|
| ✓ | Mike Moncrief (Incumbent) | 16,932 | 83.40 | |
| | Nancy Ward | 3,369 | 16.60 | |
| Majority | | 13,563 | 66.81 | |
| Turnout | | 20,301 | | |

=== 1994 ===
Texas general election, 1994: Senate District 12
| Party | Candidate | Votes | % | ±% |
|---|---|---|---|---|
| Democratic | Mike Moncrief (Incumbent) | 94,707 | 100.00 | 0.00 |
| Majority | | 94,707 | 100.00 | 0.00 |
| Turnout | | 94,707 | | −6.99 |
| Democratic hold | | | | |

=== 1992 ===
Texas general election, 1992: Senate District 12
| Party | Candidate | Votes | % | ±% |
|---|---|---|---|---|
| Democratic | Mike Moncrief (Incumbent) | 101,823 | 100.00 | |
| Majority | | 101,823 | 100.00 | |
| Turnout | | 101,823 | | |
| Democratic hold | | | | |
