= Texas's 14th Senate district =

American legislative district

Texas's 14th State Senate district
Senator
Sarah Eckhardt; D–Austin
- Demographics: 50.7% White; 10.2% Black; 31.2% Hispanic; 8.2% Asian
- Population: 970,392

District 14 of the Texas Senate is a senatorial district that currently serves a portion of Travis county in the U.S. state of Texas.

The current senator from District 14 is Sarah Eckhardt.

== Biggest cities in the district ==
District 14 has a population of 834,750 with 640,349 that is at voting age from the 2010 census.

	Name	County	Pop. (Note: Population is based on the number of people in the district in that city, not the overall population of that city)
1	Austin	Travis	560,768
2	Pflugerville	Travis	46,636
3	Elgin	Bastrop/Travis	8,135
4	Bastrop	Bastrop	7,218
5	Lago Vista	Travis	6,041

== District officeholders ==
Name		Party	Years	Legislature	Counties served
1	John F. Miller		February 16, 1846 – December 13, 1847	1st	Colorado, Fayette
2	John Winfield Scott Dancy		December 13, 1847 – November 5, 1849	2nd	Colorado, Fayette
3	Jerome B. Robertson		November 5, 1849 – November 3, 1851	3rd	Burleson, Milam, Washington, Williamson
4	James H. Armstrong		November 3, 1851 – November 7, 1853	4th	Brazos, Burleson, Leon, Milam, Robertson, Williamson
5	James K. Holland		November 7, 1853 – November 5, 1855	5th	Panola, Shelby
6	James A. Truitt		November 5, 1855 – November 7, 1859	6th 7th	Panola, Shelby
7	John R. Dickinson		November 7, 1859 – February 13, 1860	8th	Panola, Shelby
8	Henry P. C. Dulany		January 28, 1861 – November 4, 1861	8th	Panola, Shelby
9	John F. Crawford		November 4, 1861 – September 21, 1863	9th	Fannin, Hunt
10	James B. Davis		October 24, 1863 – August 6, 1866	9th 10th	Fannin, Hunt
11	Robert H. Lane		August 6, 1866 – October 31, 1866	11th	Fannin, Hunt
12	William Henry Parsons	Republican	February 8, 1870 – December 4, 1871	12th	Harris, Montgomery
13	James G. Tracy	Republican	January 14, 1873 – January 13, 1874	13th	Harris, Montgomery
14	William R. Baker	Democratic	January 13, 1874 – April 18, 1876	14th	Harris, Montgomery
15	John R. Henry	Democratic	April 18, 1876 – January 14, 1879	15th	Freestone, Limestone, Navarro
16	Francis Marion Martin	Democratic	January 14, 1879 – January 8, 1883	16th 17th	Freestone, Limestone, Navarro
17	James S. Perry	Democratic	January 8, 1883 – January 11, 1887	18th 19th	Brazos, Milam, Robertson
18	Scott Field	Democratic	January 11, 1887 – January 13, 1891	20th 21st	Brazos, Milam, Robertson
19	James M. McKinney	Democratic	January 13, 1891 – January 10, 1893	22nd	Brazos, Milam, Robertson
20	Robert A. Greer	Democratic	January 10, 1893 – January 12, 1897	23rd 24th	Hardin, Jasper, Jefferson, Liberty, Nacogdoches, Newton, Orange, Sabine, San Augustine, Tyler
21	George C. Greer	Democratic	January 18, 1897 – January 8, 1901	25th 26th	Hardin, Jasper, Jefferson, Liberty, Nacogdoches, Newton, Orange, Sabine, San Augustine, Tyler
22	John T. Beaty	Democratic	January 8, 1901 – January 8, 1907	27th 28th 29th	Hardin, Jasper, Jefferson, Liberty, Nacogdoches, Newton, Orange, Sabine, San Augustine, Tyler
23	Edward I. Kellie	Democratic	January 9, 1907 – January 10, 1911	30th 31st	Hardin, Jasper, Jefferson, Liberty, Nacogdoches, Newton, Orange, Sabine, San Augustine, Tyler
24	Vinson A. Collins	Democratic	January 10, 1911 – January 12, 1915	32nd 33rd	Hardin, Jasper, Jefferson, Liberty, Nacogdoches, Newton, Orange, Sabine, San Augustine, Tyler
25	Steve M. King	Democratic	January 12, 1915 – May 17, 1917	34th 35th	Hardin, Jasper, Jefferson, Liberty, Nacogdoches, Newton, Orange, Sabine, San Augustine, Tyler
26	Vinson A. Collins	Democratic	September 4, 1917 – January 14, 1919	35th	Hardin, Jasper, Jefferson, Liberty, Nacogdoches, Newton, Orange, Sabine, San Augustine, Tyler
27	Wilfred Roy Cousins, Sr.	Democratic	January 14, 1919 – January 13, 1925	36th 37th 38th	Hardin, Jasper, Jefferson, Liberty, Nacogdoches, Newton, Orange, Sabine, San Augustine, Tyler
28	Richard S. Bowers	Democratic	January 13, 1925 – January 8, 1929	39th 40th	Bastrop, Brazos, Burleson, Lee, Robertson, Washington
29	Charles S. Gainer	Democratic	January 8, 1929 – January 3, 1933	41st 42nd	Bastrop, Brazos, Burleson, Lee, Robertson, Washington
30	Albert Stone	Democratic	January 10, 1933 – January 14, 1941	43rd 44th 45th 46th	Bastrop, Brazos, Burleson, Lee, Robertson, Washington
31	Joseph Alton York	Democratic	January 14, 1941 – January 11, 1949	47th 48th 49th 50th	Bastrop, Brazos, Burleson, Lee, Robertson, Washington
32	William T. "Bill" Moore	Democratic	January 11, 1949 – January 13, 1953	51st 52nd	Bastrop, Brazos, Burleson, Lee, Robertson, Washington
33	Johnnie B. Rogers	Democratic	January 13, 1953 – January 8, 1957	53rd 54th	Bastrop, Travis, Williamson
34	Charles F. Herring	Democratic	January 8, 1957 – January 10, 1967	55th 56th 57th 58th 59th	Bastrop, Travis, Williamson
34	Charles F. Herring	Democratic	January 10, 1967 – January 9, 1973	60th 61st 62nd	Bastrop, Blanco, Caldwell, Hays, Travis, Williamson
34	Charles F. Herring	Democratic	January 9, 1973 – June 1, 1973	63rd	Blanco, Burnet, Caldwell, Hays, Travis
35	Lloyd Doggett	Democratic	August 18, 1973 – January 11, 1983	63rd 64th 65th 66th 67th	Blanco, Burnet, Caldwell, Hays, Travis
35	Lloyd Doggett	Democratic	January 11, 1983 – January 8, 1985	68th	Hays, Travis
36	Gonzalo Barrientos	Democratic	January 8, 1985 – January 14, 2003	69th 70th 71st 72nd 73rd 74th 75th 76th 77th	Hays, Travis
36	Gonzalo Barrientos	Democratic	January 14, 2003 – January 9, 2007	78th 79th	Travis
37	Kirk Watson	Democratic	January 9, 2007 – April 30, 2020	80th 81st 82nd	Travis
37	Kirk Watson	Democratic	January 9, 2007 – April 30, 2020	83rd 84th 85th 86th	Bastrop, Travis
38	Sarah Eckhardt	Democratic	July 31, 2020 – Present	86th 87th	Bastrop, Travis
38	Sarah Eckhardt	Democratic	July 31, 2020 – Present	88th 89th	Travis

== Election history ==
Election history of District 14 from 1992. (Note: Uncontested primary elections are not shown.)

=== 2024 ===
Texas general election, 2024: Senate District 14
Party	Candidate	Votes	%	±%
Democratic	Sarah Eckhardt (Incumbent)	321,035	100.00	+17.77
Majority		321,035	100.00	+35.55
Turnout		321,035		
Democratic hold		Swing		

=== 2022 ===
Texas general election, 2022: Senate District 14
Party	Candidate	Votes	%	±%
Democratic	Sarah Eckhardt (Incumbent)	265,094	82.23	−8.05
Libertarian	Steven Haskett	57,305	17.77	+16.68
Majority		207,789	64.45	+17.75
Turnout		322,399		
Democratic hold				

=== 2020 ===
The seat for District 14 became vacant on April 30, 2020, after the resignation of Kirk Watson. A special election was called for July 14, 2020. No candidate had received over 50 percent of the vote, therefore the race was to proceed to a runoff later in 2020 between the top two candidates in the first round, resulting in two Democrats advancing to the runoff. On July 27, 2020, Eddie Rodriguez, dropped out of the race for a runoff election, resulting in Sarah Eckhardt being declared winner.

Texas special general election: Senate District 14
Party	Candidate	Votes	%
Democratic	Sarah Eckhardt	59,267	49.66
Democratic	Eddie Rodriguez	40,384	33.84
Republican	Donald Zimmerman	15,565	13.04
Republican	Waller Thomas Burns II	1,442	1.21
Independent	Jeff Ridgeway	1,386	1.16
Libertarian	Pat Dixon	1,306	1.09
Turnout		119,350	
Democratic hold			

=== 2018 ===
Texas general election, 2018: Senate District 14
Party	Candidate	Votes	%	±%
Democratic	Kirk Watson (Incumbent)	276,052	71.93	−8.05
Republican	George W. Hindman	96,834	25.23	+25.23
Libertarian	Micah M. Verlander	10,889	2.84	−17.18
Majority		179,218	46.70	−13.26
Turnout		383,775		+98.80
Democratic hold				

=== 2014 ===
Texas general election, 2014: Senate District 14
Party	Candidate	Votes	%	±%
Democratic	Kirk Watson (Incumbent)	154,391	79.98	+19.25
Libertarian	James Arthur Strohm	38,648	20.02	+16.41
Majority		115,743	59.96	+34.90
Turnout		193,039		+2.11
Democratic hold				

=== 2010 ===
Texas general election, 2010: Senate District 14
Party	Candidate	Votes	%	±%
Democratic	Kirk Watson (Incumbent)	115,949	60.73	−19.59
Republican	Mary Lou Serafine	68,100	35.67	+35.67
Libertarian	Kent Phillips	6,884	3.61	−16.07
Majority		47,849	25.06	−35.57
Turnout		190,933		+32.53
Democratic hold				

=== 2006 ===
Texas general election, 2006: Senate District 14
Party	Candidate	Votes	%	±%
Democratic	Kirk Watson	127,223	80.32	+27.61
Libertarian	Robert "Rock" Howard	31,180	19.68	+15.51
Majority		96,043	60.63	+51.05
Turnout		158,403		−12.29
Democratic hold				

=== 2002 ===
Texas general election, 2002: Senate District 14
Party	Candidate	Votes	%	±%
Democratic	Gonzalo Barrientos (Incumbent)	95,182	52.70	−29.25
Republican	Ben Bentzin	77,885	43.12	+43.12
Libertarian	Marianne Robbins	7,537	4.17	−13.87
Majority		17,297	9.58	−54.33
Turnout		180,604		−20.20
Democratic hold				

=== 2000 ===
Texas general election, 2000: Senate District 14
Party	Candidate	Votes	%	±%
Democratic	Gonzalo Barrientos (Incumbent)	185,48	81.95	−2.92
Libertarian	Tom Davis	40,847	18.05	+2.92
Majority		144,631	63.90	−5.85
Turnout		180,604		−20.20
Democratic hold				

=== 1996 ===
Texas general election, 1996: Senate District 14
Party	Candidate	Votes	%	±%
Democratic	Gonzalo Barrientos (Incumbent)	157,194	84.87	+1.86
Natural Law	Sandra L. BonSell	28,013	15.13	+15.13
Majority		129,181	69.75	+3.72
Turnout		185,207		+13.07
Democratic hold				

=== 1994 ===
Texas general election, 1994: Senate District 14
Party	Candidate	Votes	%	±%
Democratic	Gonzalo Barrientos (Incumbent)	135,979	83.02	+15.40
Libertarian	Gary Johnson	27,820	16.98	+13.52
Majority		108,159	66.03	+27.34
Turnout		163,799		−35.75
Democratic hold				

=== 1992 ===
Texas general election, 1992: Senate District 14
Party	Candidate	Votes	%	±%
Democratic	Gonzalo Barrientos (Incumbent)	172,384	67.61	
Republican	Bill Malone, Jr.	73,729	28.92	
Libertarian	Gary E. Johnson	8,837	3.47	
Majority		98,655	38.70	
Turnout		147,975		
Democratic hold				
