= Coppedge =

Coppedge is a surname. Notable people with the surname include:

- C. C. Coppedge (1830–1898), Texas Infantry officer and politician
- Fern Coppedge (1883–1951), American painter
- Susan P. Coppedge, American attorney and diplomat
