= 85th Texas Legislature =

←	84th	86th	→
- The Seal of Texas

Overview
- Legislative body: Texas State Legislature
- Jurisdiction: Texas
- Term: January 10, 2017 – May 29, 2017
- Election: 2016 general election

Senate
- Members: 31
- President of the Senate: Dan Patrick (R)
- President pro tempore: Kel Seliger (R–31) (regular session) * Robert Nichols (R–3) * (Ad Interim)
- Party control: Republican

House of Representatives
- Members: 150
- Speaker: Joe Straus (R–121)
- Speaker Pro Tempore: Dennis Bonnen (R–25)
- Party control: Republican

Sessions
- 1st: July 18, 2017 – August 15, 2017

The 85th Texas Legislature began on January 10, 2017. All members of the House and Senate were elected in the general election held on November 8, 2016.

== Party summary ==
=== Senate ===
Affiliation	Members	Note
Republican Party	20	
Democratic Party	11	
Total	31	

=== House of Representatives ===
Affiliation	Members	Note
Republican Party	95	
Democratic Party	55	
Total	150	

== Officers ==
=== Senate ===
- Lieutenant Governor: Dan Patrick (R)
- President Pro Tempore: Kel Seliger (R)

=== House of Representatives ===
- Speaker of the House: Joe Straus (R)
- Speaker Pro Tempore: Dennis Bonnen (R)

== Members ==
=== Senate ===
Senator	Party	District	Home Town	Took office
Bryan Hughes	Republican	1	Mineola	January 10, 2017
Bob Hall	Republican	2	Edgewood	January 13, 2015
Robert Nichols	Republican	3	Jacksonville	January 9, 2007
Brandon Creighton	Republican	4	Conroe	August 26, 2014
Charles Schwertner	Republican	5	Georgetown	January 8, 2013
Carol Alvarado	Democratic	6	East End	December 21, 2018
Paul Bettencourt	Republican	7	Houston	January 13, 2015
Van Taylor	Republican	8	Plano	January 13, 2015
Kelly Hancock	Republican	9	Fort Worth	January 8, 2013
Konni Burton	Republican	10	Colleyville	January 13, 2015
Larry Taylor	Republican	11	Friendswood	January 8, 2013
Jane Nelson	Republican	12	Lewisville	January 14, 2003
Borris Miles	Democratic	13	Houston	January 10, 2017
Kirk Watson	Democratic	14	Austin	January 9, 2007
John Whitmire	Democratic	15	Houston	January 11, 1983
Don Huffines	Republican	16	Dallas	January 13, 2015
Joan Huffman	Republican	17	Southside Place	December 29, 2008
Lois Kolkhorst	Republican	18	Brenham	December 22, 2014
Pete Flores	Republican	18	Pleasanton	October 12, 2018
Carlos I. Uresti	Democratic	19	San Antonio	November 7, 2006
Juan "Chuy" Hinojosa	Democratic	20	Mission	January 14, 2003
Judith Zaffirini	Democratic	21	Laredo	January 13, 1987
Brian Birdwell	Republican	22	Granbury	July 2, 2010
Royce West	Democratic	23	Dallas	January 12, 1993
Dawn Buckingham	Republican	24	Lakeway	January 10, 2017
Donna Campbell	Republican	25	New Braunfels	January 8, 2013
Jose Menendez	Democratic	26	San Antonio	March 4, 2015
Eddie Lucio Jr.	Democratic	27	Brownsville	January 8, 1991
Charles Perry	Republican	28	Lubbock	September 30, 2014
José R. Rodríguez	Democratic	29	El Paso	January 11, 2011
Craig Estes	Republican	30	Wichita Falls	December 10, 2001
Kel Seliger	Republican	31	Amarillo	March 2, 2004

On February 22, 2018 a jury found Carlos Uresti guilty on 11 federal felony charges relating to his alleged involvement in a Ponzi scheme that defrauded investors out of hundreds of thousands of dollars. He resigned four months after he was convicted due to pressure from his Democratic colleagues.

On October 12, 2018 Pete Flores was sworn in after winning the Texas Senate District 19 special election and special election run off to fill in the vacant seat for Carlos Uresti.

== House of Representatives ==
House Rep	Party	District	Home Town	Took office
Gary VanDeaver	Republican	1	New Boston	January 13, 2015
Dan Flynn	Republican	2	Van	January 14, 2003
Cecil Bell Jr.	Republican	3	Magnolia	January 8, 2013
Lance Gooden	Republican	4	Terrell	January 10, 2017
Cole Hefner	Republican	5	Mount Pleasant	January 10, 2017
Matt Schaefer	Republican	6	Tyler	January 8, 2013
Jay Dean	Republican	7	Longview	January 10, 2017
Byron Cook	Republican	8	Corsicana	January 14, 2003
Chris Paddie	Republican	9	Marshall	January 8, 2013
John Wray	Republican	10	Waxahachie	January 13, 2015
Travis Clardy	Republican	11	Nacgdoches	January 8, 2013
Kyle Kacal	Republican	12	College Station	January 8, 2013
Leighton Schubert	Republican	13	Caldwell	March 3, 2015
John N. Raney	Republican	14	College Station	December 23, 2011
Mark Keough	Republican	15	The Woodlands	January 13, 2015
Will Metcalf	Republican	16	Conroe	January 13, 2015
John Cyrier	Republican	17	Lockhart	March 3, 2015
Ernest Bailes	Republican	18	Shepherd	January 10, 2017
James White	Republican	19	Hillister	January 8, 2013
Terry Wilson	Republican	20	Marble Falls	January 10, 2017
Dade Phelan	Republican	21	Beaumont	January 13, 2015
Joe Deshotel	Democratic	22	Beaumont	January 12, 1999
Wayne Faircloth	Republican	23	Galveston	January 13, 2015
Greg Bonnen	Republican	24	Friendswood	January 8, 2013
Dennis Bonnen	Republican	25	Angleton	January 14, 1997
Rick Miller	Republican	26	Sugar Land	January 8, 2013
Ron Reynolds	Democratic	27	Missouri City	January 11, 2011
John Zerwas	Republican	28	Richmond	January 9, 2007
Ed Thompson	Republican	29	Pearland	January 8, 2013
Geanie Morrison	Republican	30	Victoria	January 12, 1999
Ryan Guillen	Democratic	31	Rio Grande City	January 14, 2003
Todd Ames Hunter	Republican	32	Corpus Christi	January 13, 2009
Justin Holland	Republican	33	Heath	January 10, 2017
Abel Herrero	Democratic	34	Robstown	January 8, 2013
Oscar Longoria	Democratic	35	Mission	January 8, 2013
Sergio Muñoz	Democratic	36	Mission	January 11, 2011
Rene Oliveira	Democratic	37	Brownsville	April 28, 1981
Eddie Lucio III	Democratic	38	Brownsville	January 9, 2007
Armando Martinez	Democratic	39	Weslaco	January 11, 2005
Terry Canales	Democratic	40	Edinburg	January 8, 2013
Robert Guerra	Democratic	41	Mission	September 25, 2012
Richard Raymond	Democratic	42	Laredo	January 24, 2001
José Manuel Lozano	Republican	43	Kingsville	January 11, 2011
John Kuempel	Republican	44	Seguin	December 30, 2010
Jason Isaac	Republican	45	Austin	January 11, 2011
Dawnna Dukes	Democratic	46	Austin	January 10, 1995
Paul D. Workman	Republican	47	Spicewood	January 11, 2011
Donna Howard	Democratic	48	Austin	March 2, 2006
Gina Hinojosa	Democratic	49	Austin	January 10, 2017
Celia Israel	Democratic	50	Texas	February 12, 2014
Eddie Rodriguez	Democratic	51	Texas	January 14, 2003
Larry Gonzales	Republican	52	Round Rock	January 11, 2011
Andrew Murr	Republican	53	Junction	January 13, 2015
Scott Cosper	Republican	54	Killeen	January 10, 2017
Hugh Shine	Republican	55	Temple	January 10, 2017
Charles Anderson	Republican	56	Lorena	January 11, 2005
Trent Ashby	Republican	57	Lufkin	January 8, 2013
DeWayne Burns	Republican	58	Celburne	January 13, 2015
Jesse David Sheffield II	Republican	59	Gatesville	January 8, 2013
Mike Lang	Republican	60	Granbury	January 10, 2017
Phil King	Republican	61	Weatherford	January 12, 1999
Larry Phillips	Republican	62	Sherman	January 14, 2003
Tan Parker	Republican	63	Flower Mound	January 9, 2007
Lynn Stucky	Republican	64	Sanger	January 10, 2017
Ron Simmons	Republican	65	Carrollton	January 8, 2013
Matt Shaheen	Republican	66	Plano	January 13, 2015
Jeff Leach	Republican	67	Allen	January 8, 2013
Drew Springer Jr.	Republican	68	Muenster	January 8, 2013
James Frank	Republican	69	Wichita Falls	January 8, 2013
Scott Sanford	Republican	70	McKinney	January 8, 2013
Stan Lambert	Republican	71	Abilene	January 10, 2017
Drew Darby	Republican	72	San Angelo	January 9, 2007
Kyle Biedermann	Republican	73	Fredericksburg	January 10, 2017
Poncho Nevárez	Democratic	74	Eagle Pass	January 8, 2013
Mary González	Democratic	75	Clint	January 8, 2013
Cesar Blanco	Democratic	76	El Paso	January 13, 2015
Evelina Ortega	Democratic	77	El Paso	January 10, 2017
Joe Moody	Democratic	78	El Paso	January 8, 2013
Joe Pickett	Democratic	79	El Paso	January 3, 1995
Tracy King	Democratic	80	Batesville	January 11, 2005
Brooks Landgraf	Republican	81	Odessa	January 13, 2015
Tom Craddick	Republican	82	Midland	January 12, 1993
Dustin Burrows	Republican	83	Lubbock	January 13, 2015
John Frullo	Republican	84	Lubbock	November 22, 2010
Phil Stephenson	Republican	85	Wharton	January 8, 2013
John T. Smithee	Republican	86	Amarillo	January 8, 1985
Four Price	Republican	87	Amarillo	January 11, 2011
Ken King	Republican	88	Canadian	January 8, 2013
Jodie Anne Laubenberg	Republican	89	Parker	January 14, 2003
Ramon Romero Jr.	Democratic	90	Fort Worth	January 13, 2015
Stephanie Klick	Republican	91	Fort Worth	January 8, 2013
Jonathan Stickland	Republican	92	Beford	January 8, 2013
Matt Krause	Republican	93	Haslet	January 8, 2013
Tony Tinderholt	Republican	94	Arlington	January 13, 2015
Nicole Collier	Democratic	95	Fort Worth	January 8, 2013
Bill Zedler	Republican	96	Arlington	January 11, 2011
Craig Goldman	Republican	97	Fort Worth	January 8, 2013
Giovanni Capriglione	Republican	98	Southlake	January 8, 2013
Charlie Geren	Republican	99	Fort Worth	January 14, 2003
Eric Johnson	Democratic	100	Dallas	April 20, 2010
Chris Turner	Democratic	101	Grand Prairie	January 8, 2013
Linda Koop	Republican	102	Dallas	January 13, 2015
Rafael Anchia	Democratic	103	Dallas	January 11, 2005
Roberto Alonzo	Democratic	104	Dallas	January 12, 1993
Rodney Anderson	Republican	105	Grand Prairie	January 11, 2011
Pat Fallon	Republican	106	Frisco	January 8, 2013
Victoria Neave	Democratic	107	Dallas	January 10, 2017
Morgan Meyer	Republican	108	University Park	January 13, 2015
Helen Giddings	Democratic	109	Dallas	January 12, 1993
Toni Rose	Democratic	110	Dallas	January 8, 2013
Yvonne Davis	Democratic	111	Dallas	January 12, 1993
Angie Chen Button	Republican	112	Garland	January 13, 2009
Cindy Burkett	Republican	113	Sunnyvale	January 8, 2013
Jason Villalba	Republican	114	Richardson	January 8, 2013
Matt Rinaldi	Republican	115	Irving	January 13, 2015
Diana Arevalo	Democratic	116	San Antonio	January 10, 2017
Philip Cortez	Democratic	117	San Antonio	January 10, 2017
Tomas Uresti	Democratic	118	San Antonio	January 10, 2017
Roland Gutierrez	Democratic	119	San Antonio	May 14, 2008
Barbara Gervin-Hawkins	Democratic	120	San Antonio	January 10, 2017
Joe Straus	Republican	121	San Antonio	February 10, 2005
Lyle Larson	Republican	122	San Antonio	January 11, 2011
Diego Bernal	Democratic	123	San Antonio	March 3, 2015
Ina Minjarez	Democratic	124	San Antonio	April 30, 2015
Justin Rodriguez	Democratic	125	San Antonio	January 8, 2013
Kevin Roberts	Republican	126	Houston	January 8, 2017
Dan Huberty	Republican	127	Humble	January 11, 2011
Briscoe Cain	Republican	128	Deer Park	January 10, 2017
Dennis Paul	Republican	129	Houston	January 13, 2015
Tom Oliverson	Republican	130	Cypress	January 10, 2017
Alma Allen	Democratic	131	Houston	January 11, 2005
Mike Schofield	Republican	132	Katy	January 13, 2015
Jim Murphy	Republican	133	Houston	January 11, 2011
Sarah Davis	Republican	134	Houston	January 11, 2011
Gary Elkins	Republican	135	Jersey Village	January 10, 1995
Tony Dale	Republican	136	Cedar Park	January 8, 2013
Gene Wu	Democratic	137	Houston	January 8, 2013
Dwayne Bohac	Republican	138	Houston	January 14, 2003
Jarvis Johnson	Democratic	139	Houston	May 19, 2016
Armando Walle	Democratic	140	Houston	January 13, 2009
Senfronia Thompson	Democratic	141	Houston	January 11, 1983
Harold Dutton Jr.	Democratic	142	Houston	January 8, 1985
Ana Hernandez	Democratic	143	Pasadena	December 20, 2005
Mary Ann Perez	Democratic	144	Houston	January 10, 2017
Carol Alvarado	Democratic	145	East End	January 13, 2009
Shawn Thierry	Democratic	146	Houston	January 10, 2017
Garnet Coleman	Democratic	147	Houston	October 15, 1991
Jessica Farrar	Democratic	148	Houston	January 10, 1995
Hubert Vo	Democratic	149	Houston	January 11, 2005
Valoree Swanson	Republican	150	Spring	January 10, 2017

== Notable legislation ==
Texas Governor Greg Abbott signed Texas Senate Bill 4, which bans sanctuary cities, into law on May 7, 2017.
