= Texas's 13th Senate district =

American legislative district

Texas's 13th State Senate district
Senator
Borris Miles; D–Houston
- Demographics: 10.5% White; 41% Black; 40.3% Hispanic; 8.9% Asian
- Population: 886,226

District 13 of the Texas Senate is a senatorial district that currently serves portions of Fort Bend and Harris counties in the U.S. state of Texas.

The current senator from District 13 is Borris Miles.

== Biggest cities in the district ==
District 13 has a population of 946,273 with 713,052 that is at voting age from the 2020 census.

	Name	County	Pop. (Note: Population is based on the number of people in the district in that city, not the overall population of that city)
1	Houston	Fort Bend/Harris	763,700
2	Missouri City	Fort Bend/Harris	74,151
3	Stafford	Fort Bend/Harris	17,121
4	Arcola	Fort Bend	1,747
5	Pearland	Fort Bend/Harris	6,005

== District officeholders ==
Name		Party	Years	Legislature	Counties served
1	Philip Minor Cuney		February 16, 1846 – November 5, 1849	1st 2nd	Austin, Fort Bend
2	Jesse Grimes		November 5, 1849 – November 3, 1851	3rd	Grimes, Montgomery, Walker
3	James Davis		November 3, 1851 – November 7, 1853	4th	Jefferson, Liberty, Polk, Tyler
4	Madison G. Whitaker		November 7, 1853 – November 2, 1857	5th 6th	Angelina, Nacogdoches
5	John N. Fall		November 2, 1857 – November 4, 1861	7th 8th	Angelina, Nacogdoches
6	Jefferson Weatherford		November 4, 1861 – October 17, 1864	9th 10th	Dallas, Henderson, Kaufman
7	J. K. P. Record		August 6, 1866 – February 7, 1870	11th	Dallas, Henderson, Kaufman
8	John G. Bell	Republican	February 18, 1870 – January 14, 1873	12th	Austin, Fort Bend, Wharton
9	Francis J. Franks	Republican	January 14, 1873 – January 13, 1874	13th	Austin, Fort Bend, Wharton
10	Walter Moses Burton	Republican	February 20, 1874 – April 18, 1876	14th	Austin, Fort Bend, Wharton
11	Robert S. Guy	Democratic	April 18, 1876 – January 11, 1881	15th 16th	Dallas, Ellis
12	Anson Rainey	Democratic	January 11, 1881 – January 9, 1883	17th	Dallas, Ellis
13	John P. Fowler	Democratic	January 9, 1883 – January 11, 1887	18th 19th	Bastrop, Fayette, Lee
14	Jonathan Lane	Democratic	January 11, 1887 – January 13, 1891	20th 21st	Bastrop, Fayette, Lee
15	Hiram Garwood	Democratic	January 13, 1891 – January 10, 1893	22nd	Bastrop, Fayette, Lee
16	Wiley M. Imboden	Democratic	January 10, 1893 – November 11, 1893	23rd	Anderson, Cherokee, Houston, Trinity
17	Benjamin F. Rogers	Democratic	January 8, 1895 – January 10, 1899	24th 25th	Anderson, Cherokee, Houston, Trinity
18	Levi Lloyd	Democratic	January 10, 1899 – January 13, 1903	26th 27th	Anderson, Cherokee, Houston, Trinity
19	James I. Perkins	Democratic	January 13, 1903 – January 10, 1905	28th	Anderson, Angelina, Cherokee, Houston, Trinity
20	Charles C. Stokes	Democratic	January 10, 1905 – August 11, 1910	29th 30th 31st	Anderson, Angelina, Cherokee, Houston, Trinity
21	William J. Townsend, Jr.	Democratic	January 10, 1911 – January 9, 1917	32nd 33rd 34th	Anderson, Angelina, Cherokee, Houston, Trinity
22	Jeff J. Strickland	Democratic	January 9, 1917 – October 2, 1920	35th 36th	Anderson, Angelina, Cherokee, Houston, Trinity
23	I. D. Fairchild	Democratic	January 11, 1921 – January 13, 1925	37th 38th	Anderson, Angelina, Cherokee, Houston, Trinity
24	Edgar E. Witt	Democratic	January 13, 1925 – March 20, 1930	39th 40th 41st	Falls, Limestone, McLennan, Milam
25	William Robert Poage	Democratic	January 13, 1931 – January 12, 1937	42nd 43rd 44th	Falls, Limestone, McLennan, Milam
26	William R. Newton, Sr.	Democratic	January 12, 1937 – May 21, 1938	45th	Falls, Limestone, McLennan, Milam
27	Doss Hardin	Democratic	July 23, 1938 – September 13, 1940	45th 46th	Falls, Limestone, McLennan, Milam
28	Kyle Vick	Democratic	January 14, 1941 – January 13, 1953	47th 48th 49th 50th 51st 52nd	Falls, Limestone, McLennan, Milam
29	Jarrard Secrest	Democratic	January 13, 1953 – January 8, 1963	53rd 54th 55th 56th 57th	Bell, McLennan, Milam
30	Murray Watson, Jr.	Democratic	January 8, 1963 – January 10, 1967	58th 59th	Bell, McLennan, Milam
30	Murray Watson, Jr.	Democratic	January 10, 1967 – January 9, 1973	60th 61st 62nd	Bell, Falls, Limestone, McLennan, Milam
31	Walter Mengden	Republican	January 9, 1973 – January 11, 1983	63rd 64th 65th 66th 67th	Harris
32	Craig A. Washington	Democratic	January 11, 1983 – January 23, 1990	68th 69th 70th 71st	Fort Bend, Harris
33	Rodney Ellis	Democratic	February 27, 1990 – January 10, 2017	71st 72nd 73rd 74th 75th 76th 77th 78th 79th 80th 81st 82nd 83rd 84th	Fort Bend, Harris
34	Borris Miles	Democratic	January 10, 2017 – Present	85th 86th 87th 88th 89th	Fort Bend, Harris

== Election history ==
Election history of District 21 from 1992. (Note: Uncontested primary elections are not shown.)

=== 2022 ===
Borris Miles (Democratic) was unopposed; as such, the election was cancelled and Miles was declared elected without a vote.

=== 2020 ===
Texas general election, 2020: Senate District 13
Party	Candidate	Votes	%	±%
Democratic	Borris Miles (Incumbent)	200,195	80.47	−12.03
Republican	Milinda Morris	48,581	19.53	+19.53
Turnout		247,968		+28.66
Democratic hold				

=== 2016 ===
Texas general election, 2016: Senate District 13
Party	Candidate	Votes	%	±%
Democratic	Borris Miles	178,277	92.50	−7.50
Libertarian	Joshua Rohn	14,447	7.50	+7.50
Turnout		192,724		+5.97
Democratic hold				

=== 2012 ===
Texas general election, 2012: Senate District 13
Party	Candidate	Votes	%	±%
Democratic	Rodney Ellis (Incumbent)	181,866	100.00	+21.83
Turnout		181,866		+25.64
Democratic hold				

=== 2010 ===
Texas general election, 2010: Senate District 13
Party	Candidate	Votes	%	±%
Republican	Michael Mauldin	31,596	21.83	+21.83
Democratic	Rodney Ellis (Incumbent)	113,155	78.17	−21.83
Turnout		144,751		+60.57
Democratic hold				

=== 2006 ===
Texas general election, 2006: Senate District 13
Party	Candidate	Votes	%	±%
Democratic	Rodney Ellis (Incumbent)	90,148	100.00	0.00
Majority		90,148	100.00	0.00
Turnout		90,148		−16.45
Democratic hold				

=== 2002 ===
Texas general election, 2002: Senate District 13
Party	Candidate	Votes	%	±%
Democratic	Rodney Ellis (Incumbent)	107,897	100.00	0.00
Majority		107,897	100.00	0.00
Turnout		107,897		+24.55
Democratic hold				

=== 1998 ===
Texas general election, 1998: Senate District 13
Party	Candidate	Votes	%	±%
Democratic	Rodney Ellis (Incumbent)	86,631	100.00	0.00
Majority		86,631	100.00	0.00
Turnout		86,631		−3.56
Democratic hold				

=== 1994 ===
Texas general election, 1994: Senate District 13
Party	Candidate	Votes	%	±%
Democratic	Rodney Ellis (Incumbent)	89,832	100.00	+8.59
Majority		89,832	100.00	+17.18
Turnout		89,832		−39.29
Democratic hold				

=== 1992 ===
Texas general election, 1992: Senate District 13
Party	Candidate	Votes	%	±%
Democratic	Rodney Ellis (Incumbent)	135,262	91.41	
Libertarian	John Persakis	12,713	8.59	
Majority		122,549	82.82	
Turnout		147,975		
Democratic hold				
