= 80th Texas Legislature =

The 80th Texas Legislature met in regular session beginning 9 January 2007. All members of the House of Representatives and 16 members of the Senate were up for election on 7 November 2006 in the general election.

The 80th Texas Legislature convened in Regular Session on 9 January 2007. The Legislature adjourned on 28 May 2007.

== Party summary ==
=== Senate ===
Affiliation	Members	Note
Republican Party	20	
Democratic Party	11	
Total	31	

=== House of Representatives ===
Affiliation	Members	Note
Republican Party	81	
Democratic Party	69	
Total	150	

At the beginning of the regular session, the Republican Party held an 80–69 advantage with one vacancy that was filled by the GOP, creating an 81–69 Republican majority (reflected above). After the Regular Session, one Representative left the GOP and joined the Democratic Party and another Republican resigned and was replaced by a Democrat in a special election, making the tally 79–71. In February, one Democrat resigned, whose vacancy was filled by another Democrat, restoring the 79–71 tally before a GOP member of the House died, bringing the final composition to 78–71 with one vacancy.

== Officers ==
=== Senate ===
- Lieutenant Governor: David Dewhurst, Republican
- President Pro Tempore:

Regular Session: Mario Gallegos, Democrat
Ad Interim: John Carona, Republican

=== House of Representatives ===
- Speaker of the House: Tom Craddick, Republican

== Members ==
=== Senate ===
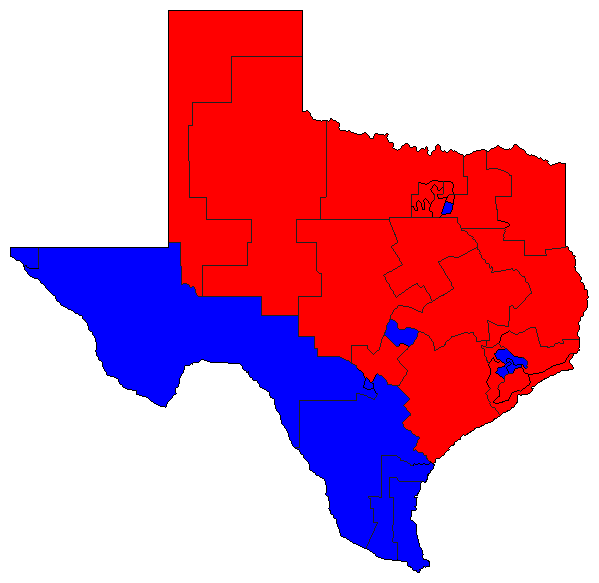
Senate composition during 80th Legislature

Senator	Party	District	Home Town	Took office
Kevin Eltife	Republican	1	Tyler	2004
Bob Deuell	Republican	2	Greenville	2003
Robert Nichols	Republican	3	Jacksonville	2007
Tommy Williams	Republican	4	The Woodlands	2003
Steve Ogden	Republican	5	Bryan	1997
Mario Gallegos, Jr.	Democratic	6	Houston	1995
Dan Patrick	Republican	7	Houston	2007
Florence Shapiro	Republican	8	Plano	1993
Chris Harris	Republican	9	Arlington	1991
Kim Brimer	Republican	10	Fort Worth	2003
Mike Jackson	Republican	11	La Porte	1999
Jane Nelson	Republican	12	Lewisville	1993
Rodney Ellis	Democratic	13	Houston	1990
Kirk Watson	Democratic	14	Austin	2007
John Whitmire	Democratic	15	Houston	1983
John Carona	Republican	16	Dallas	1996
Kyle Janek	Republican	17	Houston	2002
Glenn Hegar	Republican	18	Katy	2007
Carlos I. Uresti	Democratic	19	San Antonio	2006
Juan "Chuy" Hinojosa	Democratic	20	Mission	2002
Judith Zaffirini	Democratic	21	Laredo	1987
Kip Averitt	Republican	22	Waco	2002
Royce West	Democratic	23	Dallas	1993
Troy Fraser	Republican	24	Horseshoe Bay	1997
Jeff Wentworth	Republican	25	San Antonio	1993
Leticia R. Van de Putte	Democratic	26	San Antonio	1999
Eddie Lucio, Jr.	Democratic	27	Brownsville	1991
Robert L. Duncan	Republican	28	Lubbock	1997
Eliot Shapleigh	Democratic	29	El Paso	1997
Craig Estes	Republican	30	Wichita Falls	2001
Kel Seliger	Republican	31	Amarillo	2004

=== House of Representatives ===
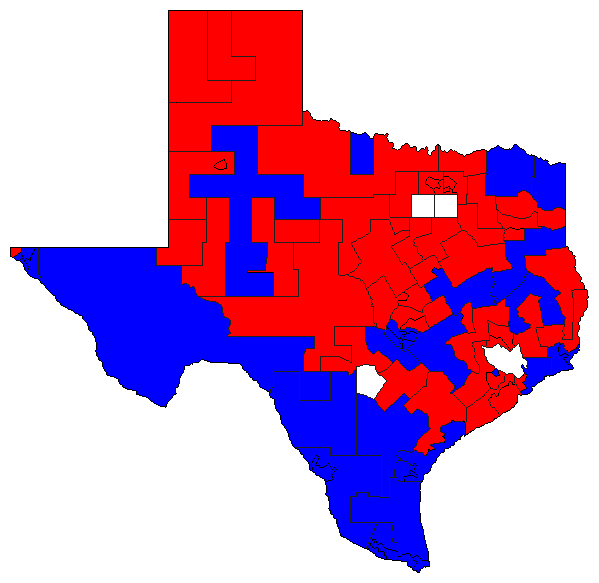
House composition during 80th Legislature

Representative	Party	Home Town/City	District ↑	County
Stephen Frost	D	New Boston	1	Bowie, Cass, Marion, Morris
Dan Flynn	R	Canton	2	Rains, Hunt, Van Zandt
Mark Homer	D	Paris	3	Lamar, Hopkins, Delta, Franklin, Titus, Red River
Betty Brown	R	Athens	4	Henderson, Kaufman
Bryan Hughes	R	Marshall	5	Camp, Upshur, Wood, Harrison
Leo Berman	R	Tyler	6	Smith
Tommy Merritt	R	Longview	7	Smith, Gregg
Byron Cook	R	Corsicana	8	Anderson, Freestone, Limestone, Navarro
Wayne Christian	R	Center	9	Shelby, Nacogdoches, San Augustine, Sabine, Jasper
Jim Pitts	R	Waxahachie	10	Ellis, Hill
Chuck Hopson	D	Jacksonville	11	Panola, Rusk, Cherokee, Houston
Jim McReynolds	D	Lufkin	12	Angelina, San Jacinto, Trinity, Tyler
Lois Kolkhorst	R	Brenham	13	Austin, Grimes, Walker, Washington
Fred Brown	R	Bryan	14	Brazos
Rob Eissler	R	The Woodlands	15	Montgomery
Brandon Creighton	R	Conroe	16	Montgomery
Robert "Robby" Cook	D	Eagle Lake	17	Bastrop, Brazos, Burleson, Colorado, Fayette, Lee
John Otto	R	Dayton	18	Montgomery, Liberty, Polk
Mike "Tuffy" Hamilton	R	Mauriceville	19	Hardin, Newton, Orange
Dan Gattis	R	Georgetown	20	Milam, Williamson
Allan Ritter	D	Nederland	21	Jefferson
Joe D. Deshotel	D	Port Arthur	22	Jefferson, Orange
Craig Eiland	D	Galveston	23	Chambers, Galveston
Larry Taylor	R	League City	24	Galveston
Dennis Bonnen	R	Angleton	25	Brazoria
Charlie F. Howard	R	Sugar Land	26	Fort Bend
Dora Olivo	D	Missouri City	27	Fort Bend
John Zerwas	R	Katy	28	Wharton, Fort Bend, Waller
Mike O'Day	R	Pearland	29	Brazoria, Matagorda
Geanie Morrison	R	Victoria	30	Refugio, Victoria, Jackson, DeWitt, Lavaca
Ryan Guillen	D	Rio Grande	31	Duval, Starr, Webb, Zapata
Juan M. Garcia	D	Portland	32	Calhoun, Aransas, San Patricio, Nueces
Solomon Ortiz Jr.	D	Corpus Christi	33	Nueces
Abel Herrero	D	Corpus Christi	34	Nueces
Yvonne Gonzalez Toureilles	D	Beeville	35	Atascosa, Karnes, McMullen, Live Oak, Bee, Jim Wells, Goliad
Ismael "Kino" Flores	D	Mission	36	Hidalgo
René O. Oliveira	D	Brownsville	37	Cameron
Eddie Lucio III	D	San Benito	38	Cameron
Armando Martinez	D	Weslaco	39	Hidalgo
Aaron Peña	D	Edinburg	40	Hidalgo
Veronica Gonzales	D	McAllen	41	Hidalgo
Richard Peña Raymond	D	Laredo	42	Webb
Juan Manuel Escobar	D	Kingsville	43	Jim Hogg, Brooks, Kleberg, Kenedy, Willacy, Cameron
Edmund Kuempel	R	Seguin	44	Wilson, Guadalupe, Gonzales
Patrick Rose	D	Austin	45	Blanco, Hays, Caldwell
Dawnna Dukes	D	Austin	46	Travis
Valinda Bolton	D	Austin	47	Travis
Donna Howard	D	Austin	48	Travis
Elliott Naishtat	D	Austin	49	Travis
Mark Strama	D	Austin	50	Travis
Eddie Rodriguez	D	Austin	51	Travis
Mike Krusee	R	Austin	52	Travis
Harvey Hilderbran	R	Kerrville	53	Crockett, Sutton, Schleicher, Real, Kerr, Kimble, Menard, Mason, Llano, San Saba, McCulloch, Concho, Coleman, Runnels, Callahan
Jimmie Don Aycock	R	Lampasas	54	Lampasas, Burnet, Bell
Dianne White Delisi	R	Temple	55	Bell
Charles "Doc" Anderson	R	Waco	56	McLennan
Jim Dunnam	D	Waco	57	McLennan, Falls, Leon, Madison, Robertson
Rob Orr	R	Burleson	58	Bosque, Johnson
Sid Miller	R	Stephenville	59	Erath, Comanche, Mills, Hamilton, Coryell, Somervell
Jim Keffer	R	Eastland	60	Brown, Eastland, Shackelford, Stephens, Palo Pinto, Hood
Phil King	R	Weatherford	61	Parker, Wise
Larry Phillips	R	Sherman	62	Fannin, Grayson
Tan Parker	R	Flower Mound	63	Denton
Myra Crownover	R	Lake Dallas	64	Denton
Burt Solomons	R	Carrollton	65	Denton
Brian McCall	R	Plano	66	Collin
Jerry Madden	R	Plano	67	Collin
Rick Hardcastle	R	Vernon	68	Motley, Dickens, Cottle, King, Hardeman, Foard, Knox, Haskell, Wilbarger, Baylor, Throckmorton, Young, Jack, Clay, Montague, Cooke
David Farabee	D	Wichita Falls	69	Wichita, Archer
Ken Paxton	R	McKinney	70	Collin
Susan King	R	Abilene	71	Nolan, Taylor
Drew Darby	R	San Angelo	72	Coke, Mitchell, Scurry, Tom Green
Nathan Macias	R	Spring Branch	73	Gillespie, Kendall, Comal, Bandera
Pete Gallego	D	Alpine	74	Uvalde, Edwards, Val Verde, Terrell, Pecos, Brewster, Presidio, Jeff Davis, Ward, Reeves, Loving, Culberson, Hudspeth
Chente Quintanilla	D	El Paso	75	El Paso
Norma Chávez	D	El Paso	76	El Paso
Paul Moreno	D	El Paso	77	El Paso
Pat Haggerty	R	El Paso	78	El Paso
Joe Pickett	D	El Paso	79	El Paso
Tracy O. King	D	Eagle Pass	80	Kinney, Maverick, Zavala, Dimmit, La Salle, Frio, Medina
Vacant			81	Andrews, Winkler, Ector
Tom Craddick	R	Midland	82	Crane, Upton, Midland, Martin, Dawson
Delwin Jones	R	Lubbock	83	Lubbock, Hockley, Cochran, Yoakum, Gaines
Carl H. Isett	R	Lubbock	84	Lubbock
Joseph P. Heflin	D	Crosbyton	85	Reagan, Irion, Sterling, Glasscock, Howard, Borden, Terry, Lynn, Garza, Crosby, Kent, Stonewall, Fisher, Jones, Hale, Floyd
John T. Smithee	R	Amarillo	86	Dallam, Hartley, Oldham, Deaf Smith, Randall
David Swinford	R	Amarillo	87	Sherman, Moore, Carson, Potter
Warren Chisum	R	Pampa	88	Parmer, Bailey, Lamb, Castro, Swisher, Armstrong, Briscoe, Hall, Donley, Collingsworth, Childress, Gray, Wheeler, Hutchison, Roberts, Hemphill, Lipscomb, Ochiltree, Hansford
Jodie Anne Laubenberg	R	Rockwall	89	Rockwall, Collin
Lon Burnam	D	Fort Worth	90	Tarrant
Kelly Hancock	R	Fort Worth	91	Tarrant
Todd Smith	R	Bedford	92	Tarrant
Paula Pierson	D	Arlington	93	Tarrant
Diane Patrick	R	Arlington	94	Tarrant
Marc Veasey	D	Fort Worth	95	Tarrant
Bill Zedler	R	Arlington	96	Tarrant
Dan Barrett	D	Fort Worth	97	Tarrant
Vicki Truitt	R	Southlake	98	Tarrant
Charlie Geren	R	River Oaks	99	Tarrant
Terri Hodge	D	Dallas	100	Dallas
Thomas Latham	R	Mesquite	101	Dallas
Tony Goolsby	R	Dallas	102	Dallas
Rafael Anchia	D	Dallas	103	Dallas
Roberto R. Alonzo	D	Dallas	104	Dallas
Linda Harper-Brown	R	Irving	105	Dallas
Kirk England	D	Grand Prairie	106	Dallas
Allen Vaught	D	Dallas	107	Dallas
Dan Branch	R	Dallas	108	Dallas
Helen Giddings	D	De Soto	109	Dallas
Barbara Mallory Caraway	D	Dallas	110	Dallas
Yvonne Davis	D	Dallas	111	Dallas
Fred Hill	R	Richardson	112	Dallas
Joe Driver	R	Garland	113	Dallas
Will Ford Hartnett	R	Dallas	114	Dallas
Jim Jackson	R	Carrollton	115	Dallas
Trey Martinez Fischer	D	San Antonio	116	Bexar
David McQuade Leibowitz	D	San Antonio	117	Bexar
Joe Farias	D	San Antonio	118	Bexar
Roland Gutierrez	D	San Antonio	119	Bexar
Ruth McClendon	D	San Antonio	120	Bexar
Joe Straus	R	San Antonio	121	Bexar
Frank Corte, Jr.	R	San Antonio	122	Bexar
Mike Villarreal	D	San Antonio	123	Bexar
Jose Menendez	D	San Antonio	124	Bexar
Joaquin Castro	D	San Antonio	125	Bexar
Patricia Harless	R	Spring	126	Harris
Joe Crabb	R	Kingwood	127	Harris
Wayne Smith	R	Baytown	128	Harris
John E. Davis	R	Houston	129	Harris
Corbin Van Arsdale	R	Houston	130	Harris
Alma Allen	D	Houston	131	Harris
William "Bill" Callegari	R	Houston	132	Harris
Jim Murphy	R	Houston	133	Harris
Ellen Cohen	D	Houston	134	Harris
Gary Elkins	R	Houston	135	Harris
Beverly Woolley	R	Houston	136	Harris
Scott Hochberg	D	Houston	137	Harris
Dwayne Bohac	R	Houston	138	Harris
Sylvester Turner	D	Houston	139	Harris
Kevin Bailey	D	Houston	140	Harris
Senfronia Thompson	D	Houston	141	Harris
Harold Dutton Jr.	D	Houston	142	Harris
Ana Hernandez	D	Houston	143	Harris
Robert Talton	R	Pasadena	144	Harris
Rick Noriega	D	Houston	145	Harris
Borris Miles	D	Houston	146	Harris
Garnet Coleman	D	Houston	147	Harris
Jessica Farrar	D	Houston	148	Harris
Hubert Vo	D	Houston	149	Harris
Debbie Riddle	R	Houston	150	Harris

: The incumbent, Republican Glenda Dawson, died before the election but after she could be replaced on the ballot. She won the November election, and was replaced by Mike O'Day (R-Pearland), elected on January 16, 2007, in a special election run-off. He was sworn into office on January 25, 2007.

: State Rep. Kirk England of Grand Prairie served as a Republican during the regular session, but joined the Democratic Party on September 19, 2007.

: State Rep. Anna Mowrey, a Republican, resigned and was replaced in a special election by Dan Barrett, a Democrat elected on December 18, 2007

: State Rep. Robert Puente (D-San Antonio) resigned on February 1, 2008.

== 2008 Elections ==
=== Incumbents retiring or seeking other offices ===
- Rep. Robert Cook (D-Eagle Lake)
- Rep. Mike O'Day (R-Pearland)
- Rep. Mike Krusee (R-Austin)
- Rep. Dianne White Delisi (R-Temple)
- Rep. Rick Noriega (D-Houston), ran for U.S. Senate

=== Incumbents defeated in primary ===
- Rep. Paul Moreno (D-El Paso)
- Rep. Juan Manuel Escobar (D-Kingsville)
- Rep. Corbin Van Arsdale (R-Houston)
- Rep. Kevin Bailey (D-Houston)
- Rep. Borris Miles (D-Houston)
