= Lindon Williams =

American politician and Justice of the Peace

Lindon Williams (December 27, 1932 – September 24, 1989) was a Texas Democratic Party politician and Justice of the Peace. He was a Texas State Senator for District 6 (Houston) from 1975 until 1985, and a member of the Texas House of Representatives from 1967 until 1974.

He died of an apparent heart attack in Baytown, Texas on September 24, 1989. He was married to Evelyn Burkett Williams of Shingler, Georgia. They had two sons, Gerald D. Williams and Lindon M. Williams II.
