= John Franklin Armstrong =

American politician

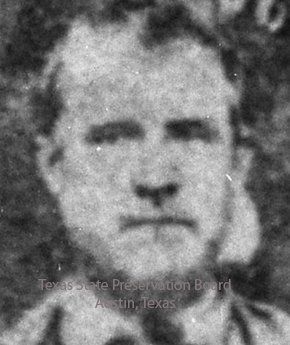
- Born: November 14, 1819; Lincoln County, Tennessee
- Died: April 28, 1887 (aged 67); Coryell County, Texas
- Occupations: School teacher and Texas state representative
- Children: Sarah Louise (Sallie) Armstrong (1851-1934), David Armstrong (1853-1871), John Franklin Armstrong Jr (1859-1937), Rhoda Margaret Armstrong (1860-1935)

John Franklin Armstrong (November 14, 1819 – April 28, 1887) was an American schoolteacher, public servant, and Texas state representative.

John Franklin Armstrong was born in Lincoln County, Tennessee, the son of William Armstrong and Mary W. I. Monroe. He married Margaret S. McCollum in Lincoln County, Tennessee, on December 29, 1850. They had two children: Sarah Louise (Sallie) Armstrong (1851-1934) and David Armstrong (1853-1871). In November 1855, at the age of 36, Armstrong moved with his family to Texas, settling in Coryell County near Gatesville, Texas. Here Armstrong established himself as a schoolteacher. In Texas, John and Margaret had two more children: John Franklin Armstrong Jr (1859-1937) and Rhoda Margaret Armstrong (1860-1935).

During the Civil War (1861-1865), Armstrong served as county tax assessor of Coryell County. In 1866, Armstrong won election as Texas state representative for Coryell County and served in the Eleventh Texas Legislature from 1866 to 1870. In August 1870, following the decision of the state legislature to establish free public schools, Armstrong was appointed school trustee for Precinct One, Second Sub-district representing Rainey's Creek. His final public appointment was to the position of county surveyor in 1871.

Armstrong was an active Mason and charter member of Gatesville Masonic Lodge No. 197, established in January 1857. Armstrong died in Coryell County on April 28, 1887, aged 67.
