= 10th Texas Legislature =

The 10th Texas Legislature met from November 2, 1863 to November 15, 1864 in its regular session and two called sessions. All members of the House of Representatives and about half of the members of the Senate were elected in 1863.

== Sessions ==
- 10th Regular session: November 2–December 16, 1863
- 10th First called session: May 9–28, 1864
- 10th Second called session: October 17–November 15, 1864

== Officers ==
=== Senate ===
Lieutenant Governor
Fletcher Summerfield Stockdale
President pro tempore
Robert Henry Guinn, Democrat

=== House of Representatives ===
Speaker of the House
M. D. K. Taylor, Democrat

== Members ==
Members of the Tenth Texas Legislature at the beginning of the regular session, November 2, 1863:

=== Senate ===
District	Senator	Party	Took office
1	Rufus K. Hartley	Democrat	1861
2	Napolean B. Charlton	Democrat	1863
3	Henry M. Kinsey	Democrat	1863
4	Spearman Holland	Democrat	1863
5	Jesse H. Parsons	Democrat	1859
6	Stephen W. Beasley	Democrat	1861
7	John W. Moore	Democrat	1861
8	Gilbert H. Wootten	Democrat	1863
9	Rice Maxey	Democrat	1862
10	Robert Henry Guinn	Democrat	1853
11	William G. W. Jowers	Democrat	1863 (First time: 1853–1855)
12	Benjamin T. Selman	Democrat	1861
13	Jefferson Weatherford	Democrat	1861 (First time: 1853–1857)
14	James B. Davis	Democrat	1863
15	James W. Throckmorton	Democrat	1863 (First time: 1857–1861)
16	A. N. Jordan	Democrat	1861
17	David Catchings Dickson	Democrat	1861
18	John W. Durant	Democrat	1861
19	Thomas C. Neal	Democrat	1863
20	William Quayle	Democrat	1863
21	Daniel Montague	Democrat	1863
22	John T. Harcourt	Democrat	1861
23	Chauncey Berkeley Shepard	Democrat	1857
24	Samuel Addison White	Democrat	1863 (First time: 1855–1857)
25	Spencer Ford	Democrat	1863
26	A. W. Moore	Democrat	1863
27	John A. Heiskell	Democrat	1863
28	George E. Burney	Democrat	1863
29	Pryor Lea	Democrat	1861
30	N. A. Mitchell	Democrat	1861
31	A. O. Cooley	Democrat	1863
32	Edward R. Hord	Democrat	1863 (First time: 1855–1857)
33	James Wiley Magoffin	Democrat	1863

=== House of Representatives ===
- Marmion Henry Bowers
- John Thomas Brady
- Constantine W. Buckley
- Stephen Heard Darden
- Alfred Wesley De Berry
- George Washington Glasscock
- John Summerfield Griffith
- James Washington Guinn
- Hays
- Edward R. Hord
- William Hamilton Ledbetter
- Marshall
- James G. McDonald
- McGuire
- William Mynatt Peck
- Davis M. Prendergast
- John H. Prince
- LaFayette Robinson, District 57, Cameron, Milam County
- Hermann Seele
- William R. Shannon, Democrat
- Slaughter
- Simpson
- M. D. K. Taylor, Democrat
- Orville Thomas Tyler
- Way

== Membership changes ==
=== Senate ===
District	Outgoing Senator	Reason for Vacancy	Successor	Date of Successor's Installation
District 3	Henry M. Kinsey	Kinsey's death was announced on February 10, 1865	None	
District 19	Thomas C. Neal	Neal died September 13, 1863	William C. Wilson	November 5, 1863
District 19	William C. Wilson	Wilson resigned April 23, 1864	William Mynatt Peck	May 17, 1864
District 25	Spencer Ford	Ford resigned June 2, 1865	None	
District 26	A. W. Moore	Moore resigned May 1, 1865	None	
District 30	N. A. Mitchell	Mitchell died after the end of the regular session	William B. Knox	May 9, 1864

- District 30: Knox was elected in special election held April 25, 1864.

=== House of Representatives ===
District	Outgoing Representative	Reason for Vacancy	Successor	Date of Successor's Installation
District 42	John H. Prince	Prince died April 18, 1864	William R. Shannon	after May 4, 1864

- District 42: Shannon was elected in special election held May 4, 1864.
