= Texas's 32nd Senate district =

American legislative district

District 32 of the Texas Senate is an obsolete Senate District. Prior to the 1876 Texas Constitution there had been as many as 33 Senate Districts. District 32 was only active from the Fifth Texas Legislature through the Eleventh Texas Legislature.

== District officeholders ==
Legislature	Senator, District 32	Counties in District
5	Isaac Lafayette Hill	Austin, Colorado, Fayette
6	Isaac Lafayette Hill	Austin, Colorado, Fayette
7	Claiborne C. Herbert	Austin, Colorado, Fayette
8	Claiborne C. Herbert	Austin, Colorado, Fayette
9	Edwin B. Scarborough	Cameron, Duval, Encinal, Hidalgo, Starr, Webb, Zapata
9	Edward R. Hord	Cameron, Duval, Encinal, Hidalgo, Starr, Webb, Zapata
10	Edward R. Hord	Cameron, Duval, Encinal, Hidalgo, Starr, Webb, Zapata
11	Francis J. Parker	Cameron, Duval, Encinal, Hidalgo, Starr, Webb, Zapata

Senator Scarborough was murdered on October 7, 1862. Senator Hord was sworn in on February 11, 1863
