= Texas's 33rd Senate district =

American legislative district

District 33 of the Texas Senate is an obsolete Senate District. Prior to the 1876 Texas Constitution there had been as many as 33 Senate Districts. District 33 was only active from the Fifth Texas Legislature through the Eleventh Texas Legislature.

== District officeholders ==
Legislature	Senator, District 33	Counties
5	Rufus Doane	El Paso, Presidio
6	Rufus Doane	El Paso, Presidio
7	Archibald C. Hyde	El Paso, Presidio
8	Archibald C. Hyde	El Paso, Presidio
9	Henry C. Cook	El Paso, Presidio
10	James Wiley Magoffin	El Paso, Presidio
11	Henry Warren	El Paso, Presidio
