= Benjamin Cromwell Franklin =

American politician

Benjamin Cromwell Franklin (April 25, 1805 – December 25, 1873) was the first judicial officeholder in the Republic of Texas.

Franklin was born in Georgia, and educated at Franklin College at the University of Georgia in Athens, before being admitted to the bar in 1827. In 1835, he travelled to Texas, and supported a declaration of war against Mexico. On April 7, 1836, he was appointed a captain in the Texas army.

In March 1836, the Republic of Texas captured a U.S.-owned brig, Pocket. Upon realising that this action could alienate the United States, the Texan government took steps to investigate the matter, and President David G. Burnet appointed Franklin district judge of Brazoria to investigate the matter. Franklin resigned his judgeship in 1839, moving to Galveston to practice law.

Franklin was elected to represent Galveston in the House of Representatives in the Third, Fifth, and Eighth Texas Legislatures. Franklin was also elected to serve in the Senate of the Fourteenth Texas Legislature, but died 25 December 1873, 2½ weeks before the start of the regular session

Although it is not officially recorded, Franklin County is generally believed to have been named in his honor.

Texas Senate
Preceded by George Thompson Ruby	Texas State Senator from District 12; 1873	Succeeded by Thomas Miller Joseph
