= Texas's 23rd Senate district =

American legislative district

Texas's 23rd State Senate district
Senator
Royce West; D–Dallas
- Demographics: 14.5% White; 38.8% Black; 45.3% Hispanic; 1.8% Asian
- Population: 887,311

District 23 of the Texas Senate is a senatorial district that currently serves portions of Dallas and Tarrant counties in the U.S. state of Texas. The current senator from District 23 is Royce West.

In 1914, it was made up eleven counties in South Texas, including Duval County. Archie Parr represented it from 1915–1934.

== Biggest cities in the district ==
District 23 has a population of 813,699 with 576,192 that is at voting age from the 2010 census.

	Name	County	Pop. (Note: Population is based on the number of people in the district in that city, not the overall population of that city)
1	Dallas	Dallas	607,734
2	DeSoto	Dallas	49,047
3	Cedar Hill	Dallas	44,477
4	Duncanville	Dallas	38,524
5	Lancaster	Dallas	36,361

== Election history ==
Election history of District 23 from 1992. (Note: Uncontested primary elections are not shown.)

=== 2024 ===
Texas general election, 2024: Senate District 23
Party	Candidate	Votes	%
Democratic	Royce West (Incumbent)	253,413	100.00
Majority		253,413	100.00
Turnout		253,413	
Democratic hold			

=== 2022 ===
Royce West (Democratic) was unopposed; as such, the election was cancelled and West was declared elected without a vote.

=== 2018 ===
Texas general election, 2018: Senate District 23
Party	Candidate	Votes	%	±%
Democratic	Royce West (Incumbent)	192,148	100.00	+20.61
Majority		192,148	100.00	+39.45
Turnout		192,148		
Democratic hold				

=== 2014 ===
Texas general election, 2014: Senate District 23
Party	Candidate	Votes	%	±%
Democratic	Royce West (Incumbent)	99,102	79.39	−2.51
Republican	John Lawson	23,520	18.84	+0.74
Libertarian	Jonathan F. Erhardt	2,204	1.77	+1.77
Majority		75,582	60.55	−3.25
Turnout		124,826		
Democratic hold				

=== 2012 ===
Texas general election, 2012: Senate District 23
Party	Candidate	Votes	%	±%
Democratic	Royce West (Incumbent)	187,407	81.90	−10.50
Republican	Bishop John Lawson	41,429	18.10	+18.10
Majority		145,978	63.80	−21.00
Turnout		228,836		
Democratic hold				

=== 2008 ===
Texas general election, 2008: Senate District 23
Party	Candidate	Votes	%	±%
Democratic	Royce West (Incumbent)	176,451	92.40	−7.60
Libertarian	Jim Renfro	14,503	7.60	+7.60
Majority		161,948	84.80	−15.20
Turnout		190,954		
Democratic hold				

=== 2004 ===
Texas general election, 2004: Senate District 23
Party	Candidate	Votes	%	±%
Democratic	Royce West (Incumbent)	150,244	100.00	0.00
Majority		150,244	100.00	0.00
Turnout		150,244		+47.60
Democratic hold				

=== 2002 ===
Texas general election, 2002: Senate District 23
Party	Candidate	Votes	%	±%
Democratic	Royce West (Incumbent)	101,793	100.00	0.00
Majority		101,793	100.00	0.00
Turnout		101,793		+65.02
Democratic hold				

=== 1998 ===
Texas general election, 1998: Senate District 23
Party	Candidate	Votes	%	±%
Democratic	Royce West (Incumbent)	61,685	100.00	0.00
Majority		61,685	100.00	0.00
Turnout		61,685		−22.07
Democratic hold				

=== 1994 ===
Texas general election, 1994: Senate District 23
Party	Candidate	Votes	%	±%
Democratic	Royce West (Incumbent)	79,157	100.00	+10.54
Majority		79,157	100.00	+21.09
Turnout		79,157		−36.12
Democratic hold				

=== 1992 ===
Texas general election, 1992: Senate District 23
Party	Candidate	Votes	%	±%
Democratic	Royce West	110,856	89.46	
Libertarian	Henry Burden	13,066	10.54	
Majority		97,790	78.91	
Turnout		123,922		
Democratic hold				

Democratic primary, 1992: Senate District 23
Candidate		Votes	%	±
	Jerald Larry	5,963	13.88	
	Jesse Oliver	12,240	28.49	
✓	Royce West	24,764	57.63	
Majority		12,524	29.15	
Turnout				

== District officeholders ==
Legislature	Senator, District 23	Counties in District
4	Thomas Hinds Duggan	DeWitt, Goliad, Gonzales, Guadalupe, Lavaca.
5	James H. Armstrong	Bell, Falls, McLennan, Milam, Williamson.
6	James H. Armstrong	Bell, Falls, McLennan, Milam, Williamson.
7	George Bernard Erath	Bell, Falls, McLennan, Milam, Williamson.
8	George Bernard Erath	Bell, Falls, McLennan, Milam, Williamson.
9	Chauncey Berkeley Shepard	Austin, Washington.
10	Chauncey Berkeley Shepard	Austin, Washington.
11	James W. McDade	Austin, Washington.
12	George R. Shannon	Bosque, Callahan, Eastland, Erath, Hood, Johnson, Jones, Palo Pinto, Parker, Stephens, Taylor.
13	Andrew J. Ball	Bosque, Callahan, Eastland, Erath, Hood, Johnson, Jones, Palo Pinto, Parker, Stephens, Taylor.
14	Andrew J. Ball	Callahan, Eastland, Erath, Haskell, Hill, Hood, Jack, Johnson, Jones, Palo Pinto, Parker, Shackelford, Stephens, Taylor, Throckmorton, Young.
15	Thomas Ball	Clay, Jack, Montague, Parker, Tarrant, Wise, Young.
16	William R. Shannon	Clay, Jack, Montague, Parker, Tarrant, Wise, Young.
17	William R. Shannon	Clay, Jack, Montague, Parker, Tarrant, Wise, Young.
18	Andrew Jackson Harris	Bell, Coryell, Hamilton, Lampasas.
19	Charles Keith Bell	Bell, Coryell, Hamilton, Lampasas.
20	Charles Keith Bell	Bell, Coryell, Hamilton, Lampasas.
21	George W. Tyler	Bell, Coryell, Hamilton, Lampasas.
22	George W. Tyler	Bell, Coryell, Hamilton, Lampasas.
23	Edwin Augustus Atlee	Aransas, Cameron, Duval, Encinal, Hidalgo, Nueces, San Patricio, Starr, Webb, Zapata.
24	Edwin Augustus Atlee	Aransas, Cameron, Duval, Encinal, Hidalgo, Nueces, San Patricio, Starr, Webb, Zapata.
25	Edwin Augustus Atlee	Aransas, Cameron, Duval, Encinal, Hidalgo, Nueces, San Patricio, Starr, Webb, Zapata.
26	Edwin Augustus Atlee	Aransas, Cameron, Duval, Encinal, Hidalgo, Nueces, San Patricio, Starr, Webb, Zapata.
27	D. McNeill Turner	Aransas, Cameron, Duval, Encinal, Hidalgo, Nueces, San Patricio, Starr, Webb, Zapata.
28	John G. Willacy	Cameron, Dimmit, Duval, Hidalgo, La Salle, McMullen, Nueces, San Patricio, Starr, Webb, Zapata.
29	John G. Willacy	Cameron, Dimmit, Duval, Hidalgo, La Salle, McMullen, Nueces, San Patricio, Starr, Webb, Zapata.
30	John G. Willacy	Cameron, Dimmit, Duval, Hidalgo, La Salle, McMullen, Nueces, San Patricio, Starr, Webb, Zapata.
31	John G. Willacy	Cameron, Dimmit, Duval, Hidalgo, La Salle, McMullen, Nueces, San Patricio, Starr, Webb, Zapata.
32	John G. Willacy	Cameron, Dimmit, Duval, Hidalgo, La Salle, McMullen, Nueces, San Patricio, Starr, Webb, Zapata.
33	John G. Willacy	Cameron, Dimmit, Duval, Hidalgo, La Salle, McMullen, Nueces, San Patricio, Starr, Webb, Zapata.
34	Archie Parr	Cameron, Dimmit, Duval, Hidalgo, La Salle, McMullen, Nueces, San Patricio, Starr, Webb, Zapata.
35	Archie Parr	Brooks, Cameron, Dimmit, Duval, Hidalgo, Jim Hogg, Jim Wells, Kleberg, La Salle, McMullen, Nueces, San Patricio, Starr, Webb, Willacy, Zapata.
36	Archie Parr	Brooks, Cameron, Dimmit, Duval, Hidalgo, Jim Hogg, Jim Wells, Kleberg, La Salle, McMullen, Nueces, San Patricio, Starr, Webb, Willacy, Zapata.
37	Archie Parr	Brooks, Cameron, Dimmit, Duval, Hidalgo, Jim Hogg, Jim Wells, Kleberg, La Salle, McMullen, Nueces, San Patricio, Starr, Webb, Willacy, Zapata.
38	Archie Parr	Brooks, Cameron, Dimmit, Duval, Hidalgo, Jim Hogg, Jim Wells, Kleberg, La Salle, McMullen, Nueces, San Patricio, Starr, Webb, Willacy, Zapata.
39	John D. Parnell	Archer, Baylor, Clay, Foard, Hardeman, Knox, Wichita, Wilbarger, Young.
40	William D. McFarlane	Archer, Baylor, Clay, Foard, Hardeman, Knox, Wichita, Wilbarger, Young.
41	William D. McFarlane	Archer, Baylor, Clay, Foard, Hardeman, Knox, Wichita, Wilbarger, Young.
42	Benjamin G. Oneal	Archer, Baylor, Clay, Foard, Hardeman, Knox, Wichita, Wilbarger, Young.
43	Benjamin G. Oneal	Archer, Baylor, Clay, Foard, Hardeman, Knox, Wichita, Wilbarger, Young.
44	Benjamin G. Oneal	Archer, Baylor, Clay, Foard, Hardeman, Knox, Wichita, Wilbarger, Young.
45	Benjamin G. Oneal	Archer, Baylor, Clay, Foard, Hardeman, Knox, Wichita, Wilbarger, Young.
46	George C. Moffett	Archer, Baylor, Clay, Foard, Hardeman, Knox, Wichita, Wilbarger, Young.
47	George C. Moffett	Archer, Baylor, Clay, Foard, Hardeman, Knox, Wichita, Wilbarger, Young.
48	George C. Moffett	Archer, Baylor, Clay, Foard, Hardeman, Knox, Wichita, Wilbarger, Young.
49	George C. Moffett	Archer, Baylor, Clay, Foard, Hardeman, Knox, Wichita, Wilbarger, Young.
50	George C. Moffett	Archer, Baylor, Clay, Foard, Hardeman, Knox, Wichita, Wilbarger, Young.
51	George C. Moffett	Archer, Baylor, Clay, Foard, Hardeman, Knox, Wichita, Wilbarger, Young.
52	George C. Moffett	Archer, Baylor, Clay, Foard, Hardeman, Knox, Wichita, Wilbarger, Young.
53	George C. Moffett	Archer, Baylor, Cottle, Foard, Hardeman, Haskell, King, Knox, Throckmorton, Wichita, Wilbarger, Young.
54	George C. Moffett	Archer, Baylor, Cottle, Foard, Hardeman, Haskell, King, Knox, Throckmorton, Wichita, Wilbarger, Young.
55	George C. Moffett	Archer, Baylor, Cottle, Foard, Hardeman, Haskell, King, Knox, Throckmorton, Wichita, Wilbarger, Young.
56	George C. Moffett	Archer, Baylor, Cottle, Foard, Hardeman, Haskell, King, Knox, Throckmorton, Wichita, Wilbarger, Young.
57	George C. Moffett	Archer, Baylor, Cottle, Foard, Hardeman, Haskell, King, Knox, Throckmorton, Wichita, Wilbarger, Young.
58	George C. Moffett	Archer, Baylor, Cottle, Dickens, Foard, Hardeman, King, Knox, Throckmorton, Wichita, Wilbarger, Young.
59	Jack Hightower	Archer, Baylor, Cottle, Dickens, Foard, Hardeman, King, Knox, Throckmorton, Wichita, Wilbarger, Young.
60	Oscar Mauzy	Portion of Dallas.
61	Oscar Mauzy	Portion of Dallas.
62	Oscar Mauzy	Portion of Dallas.
63	Oscar Mauzy	Portion of Dallas.
64	Oscar Mauzy	Portion of Dallas.
65	Oscar Mauzy	Portion of Dallas.
66	Oscar Mauzy	Portion of Dallas.
67	Oscar Mauzy	Portion of Dallas.
68	Oscar Mauzy	Portions of Dallas, Tarrant.
69	Oscar Mauzy	Portions of Dallas, Tarrant.
70	Eddie Bernice Johnson	Portions of Dallas, Tarrant.
71	Eddie Bernice Johnson	Portions of Dallas, Tarrant.
72	Eddie Bernice Johnson	Portions of Dallas, Tarrant.
73	Royce West	Portion of Dallas.
74	Royce West	Portions of Dallas, Tarrant.
75	Royce West	Portions of Dallas, Tarrant.
76	Royce West	Portions of Dallas, Tarrant.
77	Royce West	Portions of Dallas, Tarrant.
78	Royce West	Portion of Dallas.
79	Royce West	Portion of Dallas.
80	Royce West	Portion of Dallas.
81	Royce West	Portion of Dallas.
82	Royce West	Portion of Dallas.
83	Royce West	Portion of Dallas.
84	Royce West	Portion of Dallas.
85	Royce West	Portion of Dallas.
86	Royce West	Portion of Dallas.
87	Royce West	Portion of Dallas.
88	Royce West	Portions of Dallas, Tarrant.
89	Royce West	Portions of Dallas, Tarrant.
