= 11th Texas Legislature =

The 11th Texas Legislature met from August 6, 1866, to November 13, 1866, in its regular session. All members of the House of Representatives and about half of the members of the Senate were elected in 1865.

== Sessions ==
- 11th Regular session: August 6–November 13, 1866

== Officers ==
=== Senate ===
Lieutenant Governor
George Washington Jones
President pro tempore
Robert Henry Guinn, Democrat

Jones was removed from office in July 1867 by General Phillip H. Sheridan. The office of Lieutenant Governor remained vacant until 1870. Robert Henry Guinn served as acting Lieutenant Governor for the remainder of the term.

=== House of Representatives ===
Speaker of the House
Nathaniel Macon Burford, Unionist

== Members ==
Members of the Eleventh Texas Legislature at the beginning of the regular session, August 6, 1866:

=== Senate ===
District	Senator	Party	Took office
1	Frederick F. Foscue		1865
2	William M. Neyland		1865
3	James W. Guinn		1865
4	James A. Truitt	Democrat	1865 (Previous: 1851–1853, 1855–1859)
5	John G. Brown		1865
6	C. C. Coppedge		1865
7	William P. Saufley		1865
8	Samuel N. Braswell		1865
9	Hudson W. Nelson		1865
10	Robert Henry Guinn	Democrat	1853
11	William G. W. Jowers	Democrat	1863 (Previous: 1853–1855)
12	Benjamin T. Selman	Democrat	1861
13	J. K. P. Record		1865
14	Robert H. Lane		1865
15	John K. Bumpass		1865
16	Abram Morris Gentry	Democrat	1865 (Previous: 1859–1861)
17	Benton Randolph		1865
18	James B. Boyd		1865
19	John C. Yarbro		1865
20	William R. Shannon	Democrat	1865
21	J. M. Blount		1865
22	Richard V. Cook		1865
23	James W. McDade		1865
24	Jacob B. Reid		1865
25	James W. Stell		1865
26	Nathan George Shelley	Democrat	1865 (Previous: 1861–1863)
27	William Cornelius Dalrymple	Democrat	1865
28	George E. Burney	Democrat	1863
29	John T. Littleton		1865
30	William B. Knox	Democrat	1864
31	A. O. Cooley	Republican	1863
32	Francis J. Parker		1865
33	Henry Warren		1865

=== House of Representatives ===
Representatives of the Eleventh Texas Legislature serving from 1866 to 1870:

Representative	District	County
George F. Alford	11	Trinity
William R. Anderson	8	Angelina
John Franklin Armstrong	61	Coryell
Robert A. Atkinson	64	Gonzales
James M. Baker	62	DeWitt
D.C. Barmore	68	Burnet
Flavius Josepheus Barrett	46	Wise
Joshua Runey Beauchamp	57	Milam
R.H. Bellamy	14	Panola
Reading Wood Black	72	Uvalde
Thomas William Blount	5	San Augustine
Thomas Reuben Bonner	12	Cherokee
L.D. Bradley	40	Freestone
John Thomas Brady	36	Harris
Nathaniel Macon Burford	44	Dallas
Edward Chambers	32	Collin
Juan Chaves	71	Bexar
Archelaus Cochran	44	Dallas
Nehemiah Cochran	48	Austin
M.W. Damron	59	Bell
William C. Daniel	12	Cherokee
Wickliffe Dashiell	27	Kaufman
D.H. Davis	23	Lamar
Alonzo Alphmer DeAvelon	76	Nueces
George Washington Diamond	13	Rusk
Randolph Doom	4	Jasper
Middleton Dunn	65	Guadalupe
J.A. Durand	71	Bexar
Bruno Durst	39	Leon
W.E. Estes	20	Bowie
Samuel Evans	43	Tarrant
Samuel Thompson Foster	70	Live Oak
Gregorio N. García	77	El Paso
Robert Garrett	15	Harrison
Robert Gaston	17	Smith
Jabez Giddings	51	Washington
Jesse Martin Glasco	21	Upshur
George Washington Glasscock	56	Travis
Charles Grayson	7	Nacogdoches
Edward Jeremiah Gurley	60	McLennan
Francis DeLaVaux Hallonquist	21	Upshur
George Duncan Hancock	55	Travis
James Hanks	10	Anderson
Lewis Harman	25	Lamar
William E. Hart	19	Titus
Benjamin Hendley	42	Ellis
Willis Holford	31	Grayson
Warren H. Hooks	22	Red River
Francis Charles Hume	38	Walker
H.R. Jackson	18	Davis (Cass)
Charles Hill Jones	3	Tyler
Dudley William Jones	20	Titus
C.L. Jordan	42	Parker
William Kendall	45	Denton
Ambrose Dudley Kent	1	Jefferson
Lorenzo King	24	Hopkins
Claiborne Kyle	58	Hays
Jonathan Lewter	17	Smith
John Lund	75	Starr
James R. McKee	29	Fannin
Franklin Merriman	34	Galveston
John Moncure	54	Bastrop
Mordello Stephen Munson	35	Brazoria
Daniel Murchison	66	Comal
Truman Phelps	62	Victoria
J.T. Ratliff	41	Hill
George Robertson Reeves	33	Grayson
Samuel J. Richardson	16	Harrison
Josiah Shaw	49	Colorado
Daniel McDowell Short	6	Shelby
Horace Simonds	28	Hunt
Ashbel Smith	36	Harris
Mark Stroud	13	Rusk
William Tate	63	Lavaca
Frederick Tegener	67	Kerr
James Thomas	73	Cameron
Nathan Thomas	52	Fayette
Thomas Thompson	74	Hidalgo
Alfred Sturgis Thurmond	69	Refugio
A.B. Trowell	2	Liberty
Benjamin Tyus	40	Limestone
William Upton	50	Fayette
J.W. Weaver	37	Brazos
William Hillman Wheelock	53	Robertson
Dave White	26	Wood
William Whitsett	30	Fannin
James Whitten	47	Wharton
R.W. Wiley	27	Henderson
Israel Worsham	37	Montgomery

== Membership changes ==
=== Senate ===
District	Outgoing Senator	Reason for Vacancy	Successor	Date of Successor's Installation
District 3	James Washington Guinn	Guinn died August 18, 1866	Frederick Voight	October 8, 1866
District 14	Robert H. Lane	Lane resigned October 31, 1866	None	
