= 84th Texas Legislature =

Term of state legislature in Texas, U.S.

The 84th Texas Legislature began on January 13, 2015. All members of the House and Senate were elected in the general election held on November 4, 2014.

== Party summary ==
=== Senate ===
Affiliation	Members	Note
Republican Party	20	
Democratic Party	11	
Total	31	

=== House of Representatives ===
Affiliation	Members	Note
Republican Party	98	
Democratic Party	52	
Total	150	

== Officers ==
=== Senate ===
- Lieutenant Governor: Dan Patrick (R)
- President Pro Tempore: Juan Hinojosa (D)

=== House of Representatives ===
- Speaker of the House: Joe Straus (R)
- Speaker Pro Tempore: Dennis Bonnen (R)

== Members ==
=== Senate ===
Senator	Party	District	Home Town	Took office
Kevin Eltife	Republican	1	Tyler	March 5, 2004
Bob Hall	Republican	2	Greenville	January 13, 2015
Robert Nichols	Republican	3	Jacksonville	January 9, 2007
Brandon Creighton	Republican	4	The Woodlands	August 26, 2014
Charles Schwertner	Republican	5	Georgetown	January 8, 2013
Sylvia Garcia	Democratic	6	Houston	March 11, 2013
Paul Bettencourt	Republican	7	Houston	January 13, 2015
Van Taylor	Republican	8	McKinney	January 13, 2015
Kelly Hancock	Republican	9	Fort Worth	January 8, 2013
Konni Burton	Republican	10	Fort Worth	January 13, 2015
Larry Taylor	Republican	11	Friendswood	January 8, 2013
Jane Nelson	Republican	12	Lewisville	January 14, 2003
Rodney Ellis	Democratic	13	Houston	February 27, 1990
Kirk Watson	Democratic	14	Austin	January 9, 2007
John Whitmire	Democratic	15	Houston	January 11, 1983
Don Huffines	Republican	16	Dallas	January 13, 2015
Joan Huffman	Republican	17	Southside Place	December 29, 2008
Lois Kolkhorst	Republican	18	Katy	December 22, 2014
Carlos I. Uresti	Democratic	19	San Antonio	November 27, 2006
Juan "Chuy" Hinojosa	Democratic	20	Mission	January 14, 2003
Judith Zaffirini	Democratic	21	Laredo	January 13, 1987
Brian Birdwell	Republican	22	Granbury	July 2, 2010
Royce West	Democratic	23	Dallas	January 12, 1993
Troy Fraser	Republican	24	Horseshoe Bay	January 14, 1997
Donna Campbell	Republican	25	New Braunfels	January 8, 2013
Jose Menendez	Democratic	26	San Antonio	March 4, 2015
Eddie Lucio Jr.	Democratic	27	Brownsville	January 8, 1991
Charles Perry	Republican	28	Lubbock	September 30, 2014
José R. Rodríguez	Democratic	29	El Paso	January 11, 2011
Craig Estes	Republican	30	Wichita Falls	December 10, 2001
Kel Seliger	Republican	31	Amarillo	December 10, 2001

-Jose Menendez was sworn in on March 4, 2015 after a special election runoff on February 17, 2015 to serve the remaining term of Leticia Van de Putte. A special election was held March 31, 2015 after Jose Menendez was sworn in.

=== House of Representatives ===
House Rep	Party	District	Home Town	Took office
Gary VanDeaver	Republican	1	New Boston	January 13, 2015
Dan Flynn	Republican	2	Van	January 14, 2003
Cecil Bell Jr.	Republican	3	Magnolia	January 8, 2013
Stuart Spitzer	Republican	4	Kaufman	January 13, 2015
Bryan Hughes	Republican	5	Mineola	January 10, 2003
Matt Schaefer	Republican	6	Tyler	January 8, 2013
David Simposon	Republican	7	Longview	January 11, 2011
Byron Cook	Republican	8	Corsicana	January 14, 2003
Chris Paddie	Republican	9	Marshall	January 8, 2013
John Wray	Republican	10	Waxahachie	January 13, 2015
Travis Clardy	Republican	11	Nacgdoches	January 8, 2013
Kyle Kacal	Republican	12	College Station	January 8, 2013
Leighton Schubert	Republican	13	Caldwell	March 3, 2015
John N. Raney	Republican	14	College Station	December 23, 2011
Mark Keough	Republican	15	The Woodlands	January 13, 2015
Will Metcalf	Republican	16	Conroe	January 13, 2015
Tim Kleinschmidt	Republican	17	Lexington	January 13, 2009
John Cyrier	Republican	18	Lockhart	March 3, 2015
John Otto	Republican	19	Dayton	January 11, 2005
James White	Republican	20	Hillister	January 8, 2013
Marsha Farney	Republican	21	Georgetown	January 8, 2013
Dade Phelan	Republican	22	Beaumont	January 13, 2015
Joe Deshotel	Democratic	23	Beaumont	January 12, 1999
Wayne Faircloth	Republican	24	Galveston	January 13, 2015
Greg Bonnen	Republican	25	Friendswood	January 8, 2013
Dennis Bonnen	Republican	26	Angleton	January 14, 1997
Rick Miller	Republican	27	Sugar Land	January 8, 2013
Ron Reynolds	Democratic	28	Missouri City	January 11, 2011
John Zerwas	Republican	29	Richmond	January 9, 2007
Ed Thompson	Republican	30	Pearland	January 8, 2013
Geanie Morrison	Republican	31	Victoria	January 12, 1999
Ryan Guillen	Democratic	32	Rio Grande City	January 14, 2003
Todd Ames Hunter	Republican	33	Corpus Christi	January 13, 2009
Scott Turner	Republican	34	Frisco	January 8, 2013
Abel Herrero	Democratic	35	Robstown	January 8, 2013
Oscar Longoria	Democratic	36	Mission	January 8, 2013
Sergio Muñoz	Democratic	37	Mission	January 11, 2011
Rene Oliveira	Democratic	38	Brownsville	April 28, 1981
Eddie Lucio III	Democratic	39	Brownsville	January 9, 2007
Armando Martinez	Democratic	40	Weslaco	January 11, 2005
Terry Canales	Democratic	41	Edinburg	January 8, 2013
Robert Guerra	Democratic	42	Mission	September 25, 2012
Richard Raymond	Democratic	43	Laredo	January 24, 2001
José Manuel Lozano	Republican	44	Kingsville	January 11, 2011
John Kuempel	Republican	45	Seguin	December 30, 2010
Jason Isaac	Republican	46	Austin	January 11, 2011
Dawnna Dukes	Democratic	47	Austin	January 10, 1995
Paul D. Workman	Republican	48	Spicewood	January 11, 2011
Donna Howard	Democratic	49	Austin	March 2, 2006
Elliott Naishtat	Democratic	50	Austin	January 8, 1991
Celia Israel	Democratic	51	Texas	February 12, 2014
Eddie Rodriguez	Democratic	52	Texas	January 14, 2003
Larry Gonzales	Republican	53	Round Rock	January 11, 2011
Andrew Murr	Republican	54	Junction	January 13, 2015
Jimmie Don Aycock	Republican	55	Killeen	January 9, 2007
Molly White	Republican	56	Belton	January 13, 2015
Charles Anderson	Republican	57	Lorena	January 11, 2005
Trent Ashby	Republican	58	Lufkin	January 8, 2013
DeWayne Burns	Republican	59	Celburne	January 13, 2015
Jesse David Sheffield II	Republican	60	Gatesville	January 8, 2013
Jim Keffer	Republican	61	Eastland	January 14, 1997
Phil King	Republican	62	Weatherford	January 12, 1999
Larry Phillips	Republican	63	Sherman	January 14, 2003
Tan Parker	Republican	64	Flower Mound	January 9, 2007
Myra Crownover	Republican	65	Lake Dallas	May 10, 2000
Ron Simmons	Republican	66	Carrollton	January 8, 2013
Matt Shaheen	Republican	67	Plano	January 13, 2015
Jeff Leach	Republican	68	Allen	January 8, 2013
Drew Springer Jr.	Republican	69	Muenster	January 8, 2013
James Frank	Republican	70	Wichita Falls	January 8, 2013
Scott Sanford	Republican	71	McKinney	January 8, 2013
Susan King	Republican	72	Abilene	January 9, 2007
Drew Darby	Republican	73	San Angelo	January 9, 2007
Doug Miller	Republican	74	New Braunfels	January 13, 2009
Poncho Nevárez	Democratic	75	Eagle Pass	January 8, 2013
Mary González	Democratic	76	Clint	January 8, 2013
Cesar Blanco	Democratic	77	El Paso	January 13, 2015
Marisa Marquez	Democratic	78	El Paso	January 13, 2009
Joe Moody	Democratic	79	El Paso	January 8, 2013
Joe Pickett	Democratic	80	El Paso	January 3, 1995
Tracy King	Democratic	81	Batesville	January 11, 2005
Brooks Landgraf	Republican	82	Odessa	January 13, 2015
Tom Craddick	Republican	83	Midland	January 12, 1993
Dustin Burrows	Republican	84	Lubbock	January 13, 2015
John Frullo	Republican	85	Lubbock	November 22, 2010
Phil Stephenson	Republican	86	Wharton	January 8, 2013
John T. Smithee	Republican	87	Amarillo	January 8, 1985
Four Price	Republican	88	Amarillo	January 11, 2011
Ken King	Republican	89	Canadian	January 8, 2013
Jodie Anne Laubenberg	Republican	90	Parker	January 14, 2003
Ramon Romero Jr.	Democratic	91	Fort Worth	January 13, 2015
Stephanie Klick	Republican	92	Fort Worth	January 8, 2013
Jonathan Stickland	Republican	93	Beford	January 8, 2013
Matt Krause	Republican	94	Haslet	January 8, 2013
Tony Tinderholt	Republican	95	Arlington	January 13, 2015
Nicole Collier	Democratic	96	Fort Worth	January 8, 2013
Bill Zedler	Republican	97	Arlington	January 11, 2011
Craig Goldman	Republican	98	Fort Worth	January 8, 2013
Giovanni Capriglione	Republican	99	Southlake	January 8, 2013
Charlie Geren	Republican	100	Fort Worth	January 14, 2003
Eric Johnson	Democratic	101	Dallas	April 20, 2010
Chris Turner	Democratic	102	Grand Prairie	January 8, 2013
Linda Koop	Republican	103	Dallas	January 13, 2015
Rafael Anchia	Democratic	104	Dallas	January 11, 2005
Roberto Alonzo	Democratic	105	Dallas	January 12, 1993
Rodney Anderson	Republican	106	Grand Prairie	January 11, 2011
Pat Fallon	Republican	107	Frisco	January 8, 2013
Kenneth Sheets	Republican	108	Dallas	January 11, 2011
Morgan Meyer	Republican	109	University Park	January 13, 2015
Helen Giddings	Democratic	110	Dallas	January 12, 1993
Toni Rose	Democratic	111	Dallas	January 8, 2013
Yvonne Davis	Democratic	112	Dallas	January 12, 1993
Angie Chen Button	Republican	113	Garland	January 13, 2009
Cindy Burkett	Republican	114	Sunnyvale	January 8, 2013
Jason Villalba	Republican	115	Richardson	January 8, 2013
Matt Rinaldi	Republican	116	Irving	January 13, 2015
Trey Martinez Fischer	Democratic	117	San Antonio	January 9, 2001
Rick Galindo	Republican	118	San Antonio	January 13, 2015
Joe Farias	Democratic	119	San Antonio	January 9, 2007
John Lujuan	Republican	120	San Antonio	February 9, 2016
Roland Gutierrez	Democratic	121	San Antonio	May 14, 2008
Ruth McClendon	Democratic	122	San Antonio	November 12, 1996
Laura Thompson	Independent	123	San Antonio	August 16, 2016
Joe Straus	Republican	124	San Antonio	February 10, 2005
Lyle Larson	Republican	125	San Antonio	January 11, 2011
Diego Bernal	Democratic	126	San Antonio	March 3, 2015
Jose Menendez	Democratic	127	San Antonio	January 9, 2001
Ina Minjarez	Democratic	128	San Antonio	April 30, 2015
Justin Rodriguez	Democratic	129	San Antonio	January 8, 2013
Patricia Harless	Republican	130	Spring	January 9, 2007
Dan Huberty	Republican	131	Humble	January 11, 2011
Wayne Smith	Republican	132	Baytown	January 14, 2003
Dennis Paul	Republican	133	Houston	January 13, 2015
Allen Fletcher	Republican	134	Houston	January 13, 2009
Alma Allen	Democratic	135	Houston	January 11, 2005
Mike Schofield	Republican	136	Katy	January 13, 2015
Jim Murphy	Republican	137	Houston	January 11, 2011
Sarah Davis	Republican	138	Houston	January 11, 2011
Gary Elkins	Republican	139	Jersey Village	January 10, 1995
Tony Dale	Republican	140	Cedar Park	January 8, 2013
Gene Wu	Democratic	141	Houston	January 8, 2013
Dwayne Bohac	Republican	142	Houston	January 14, 2003
Sylvester Turner	Democratic	143	Houston	January 10, 1989
Jarvis Johnson	Democratic	144	Houston	May 19, 2016
Armando Walle	Democratic	145	Houston	January 13, 2009
Senfronia Thompson	Democratic	146	Houston	January 11, 1983
Harold Dutton Jr.	Democratic	147	Houston	January 8, 1985
Ana Hernandez	Democratic	148	Pasadena	December 20, 2005
Gilbert Peña	Republican	149	Pasadena	January 13, 2015
Carol Alvarado	Democratic	150	East End	January 13, 2009
Borris Miles	Democratic	146	Houston	January 9, 2007
Garnet Coleman	Democratic	147	Houston	October 15, 1991
Jessica Farrar	Democratic	148	Houston	January 10, 1995
Hubert Vo	Democratic	149	Houston	January 11, 2005
Debbie Riddle	Republican	150	Houston	April 10, 2002

- On February 16, 2015 John Lujan is sworn in for the 118th House district after winning the special election and the special election runoff for Joe Faris's seat.

- Leighton Schubert was sworn in on March 3, 2015 in the 13th House district after a special election was held on February 17, 2015 to finish Lois Kolkhorst's term when she was sworn in for Texas's 18th Senate district.

- John Cyrier was sworn in on March 3, 2015 in the 17th House district after a special runoff election was held on February 17, 2015 to fill the vacancy of Tim Kleinschmidt when he resigned a day after he was sworn in.

- On April 30, 2015 Ina Minjarez was sworn into the 124th House district to succeed Jose Menendez after he got elected to Texas's 26th Senate district

- On August 10, 2015 Joe Faris Resigned from the 118th House district.

-Sylvester Turner resigned from the 139th House district on January 1, 2016 to be sworn in as Mayor for Houston after winning the 2015 election.

- On January 31, 2016 Ruth McClendon resigned from the 120th House district.

- On May 19, 2016 Jarvis Johnson, is sworn in to the 139th House district.

- On August 16, 2016 Laura Thompson sworn in after Ruth Jones McLendon resigned from her seat by winning the special election runoff and the special election ordered by the governor.

== Notable legislation ==
On June 11, 2015, Texas Governor Greg Abbott signed the "Pastor Protection Act" which allows pastors to refuse to marry couples if they feel doing so violates their beliefs. On June 13, 2015, Abbott signed a campus carry bill (SB 11) and an open carry bill (HB 910) into law.
