= Elisha Everett Lott =

American politician (1820–1864)

Member of the Texas Senate from the 10th district
- In office 1853–1861
- Preceded by: Z. Williams Eddy
- Succeeded by: Robert Henry Guinn

Personal details
- Born: February 24, 1820 Mississippi, U.S.
- Died: January 17, 1864 (aged 43) Starrville, Texas, U.S.
- Party: Democratic
- Children: 5

Military service
- Branch/service: Confederate States Army
- Battles/wars: American Civil War

Elisha Everett Lott (February 24, 1820 – January 17, 1864) was an American politician who served as a member of the Texas Senate from 1853 to 1861. He is remembered primarily for his vigorous opposition to the Cherokee Land Bill of 1844.

== Early years ==
Lott was born in Mississippi on February 24, 1820, the son of John Lott.

== Career ==
In 1842, Lott was elected as a representative in the Eighth Texas Congress, replacing Isaac Van Zandt.

In addition to his opposition to the Cherokee Land Bill of 1844, Lott is known for serving on the official 1846 commission that laid out the boundaries of Smith County, Texas, and selected the city of Tyler as the county seat. For this reason, he is sometimes called the founder of Smith County. He represented Smith County in the Texas House of Representatives from 1847 until 1853 and in the Texas Senate from 1857 until 1861. His constituents asked that he run for governor of Texas in 1857, but he declined.

Lott was also Tyler's first postmaster, a position he held from 1847 until 1850. He served as a delegate to the national Democratic convention at Baltimore in 1852. Lott resigned from the Legislature in 1861 to serve as a lieutenant colonel in the Confederate States Army.

== Personal life ==
At the age of 20, he married Mary E. Lott and the couple moved to Harrison County, Texas. After the death of his first wife, he married Anna Cook in 1856.

His health failed due to overexertion on the battlefront, and he died on January 17, 1864, at his home in Starrville, north of Tyler, and was buried there. His wife Anna and their five children survived him. He was a Mason and a Methodist.

== Sources ==
- Elisha Everitt Lott from the Handbook of Texas Online
- East Texas Genealogical Society

Texas Senate
Preceded by Z. Williams Eddy	Texas State Senator from District 10; 1853–1861	Succeeded by Robert Henry Guinn
