= Robert Henry Guinn =

American politician

Robert Henry Guinn (January 19, 1822 – January 18, 1887) was a Texas politician.

Guinn was a Democrat and served District 11, representing Cherokee County, Texas, in the Texas State Senate during the Fifth Texas Legislature, Sixth Texas Legislature, Seventh Texas Legislature, and Eighth Texas Legislature sessions (1853–1861). The Eighth Texas Legislature (1859–61) was called into special session by Governor Sam Houston, and retroactively authorized the Secession Convention, whose ordinance of secession from the United States was approved by the voters on February 23, 1861 , against the Governor's wishes. In the Ninth Texas Legislature, Tenth Texas Legislature, and Eleventh Texas Legislature sessions, Guinn served as President pro tempore (1861–1866), following which no legislative sessions were held until 1870.

Notable descendants of Robert Henry Guinn include Leland A. Guinn, Architect, of Longview, Texas, whose contributions include portions of the Kilgore College campus; as well as Colin Guinn, contestant on The Amazing Race 5.
