= C. C. Coppedge =

American politician

Charles Clark Coppedge (February 2, 1830 – June 11, 1898) was a Texas ordnance infantry officer and a member of the Texas Legislature.

Coppedge was born in Dickson County, Tennessee. In the 1850s he moved to East Texas along with other members of the Coppedge family, including his brother, William Lindsey Coppedge. He started the first store in the community of Smyrna (Harrison County) in 1855.

In 1862, he enlisted in the 19th Texas Infantry and was elected junior second lieutenant of Company F, serving as such in charge of ordnance for the infantry. Following the war, he was elected to the Texas State Senate in 1865 and served in the Eleventh Texas Legislature.

He was married three times and was the father of 20 children. Many of his descendants still live in the area of East Texas where he lived and served. He died in Ore City, Texas.
