= William M. Taylor =

American judge (1876–1959)

William McLaughlin Taylor Sr. (April 2, 1876 – May 1, 1959) was a justice of the Supreme Court of Texas from September 21, 1945 to December 31, 1950.

His son, William McLaughlin Taylor Jr., was a United States federal judge.

Political offices
Preceded by Newly created seat	Justice of the Texas Supreme Court; 1945–1950	Succeeded by Will Wilson
