= William Thomas Scott =

William Thomas Scott (1839–1917) was a prominent business and political leader in Cairo, Illinois. Scott was briefly the first African American presidential nominee in the United States.

== Early life ==
William Thomas Scott, or Billy Scott, was born in Newark, Ohio, on April 28, 1839, to Lucy Scott and his father, whose name is unknown. He grew up in a family that included his grandfather, Samuel Scott, and his five siblings, Henry, Hiram, Wilson, Ann, and Jane. He received training to be a barber through a nearly ten year long apprenticeship to Henry Robinson. He also worked briefly on the riverboats on the Ohio River. In 1863, Scott enlisted in the Union Navy and served for an 18-month tour on the USS Clara Dolsen as a wardroom steward in Cairo, Illinois, which was the Union Army's headquarters during the Civil War.

== Personal life ==
Scott married Nellie in Cincinnati in 1861. Nellie gave birth to four children, three of whom survived until adulthood. Their children were named William, Wilmina, A.D., and Jessie. Wilmina died shortly before her first birthday in 1865. After Nellie died in 1871 due to complication with Jessie's childbirth, Scott married his second wife, Lizzineky Jenkins of Massac County on April 22, 1872, in the town of Metropolis. Jessie died in 1876, at the age of six.

== Business career ==
While he learned the barber trade in Ohio, he never practiced it until he got to Cairo. Within a year of being discharged from the Army, Scott opened a saloon in Cairo that served both black and white patrons. Soon after, Scott opened the Metropolitan Hotel, advertised as “the only first class place of entertainment in the West for the accommodation of colored guests,” fully equipped with a billiard parlor, ice cream parlor, and a dancehall. He also became a bondsman and dabbled in the liquor and gambling industry. Scott later in life also became the publisher and editor of what could have very well been the first African American daily Newspaper, the Cairo Gazette.

== Political career ==
When African American people were granted the right to vote in 1870, Scott was already a leading member of the Republican Party in Cairo. Scott ran for City Marshall of Cairo in 1871 and received around 30% of the Republican votes (which was almost the entire African American voter population at the time), but he did not win. He later became a Democrat and helped build the National Negro Liberal Party (NNLP). In 1890, he became the president of the National Negro Democratic League (NNDL) as well as the Negro Bureau within the National Democratic Party. He was also the founder and president of the National Negro Anti Imperialist, Anti Expansion, Anti Trust, and Anti Lynch League starting in 1899.

While many histories have erroneously proclaimed George Edwin Taylor the first African American presidential nominee put forward by the NNLP, it was in fact William Thomas Scott. He was forced to step aside and was removed from the party's ticket, however, when his scandalous past in the "vice trades" came to light. Despite multiple arrests for bootlegging and running houses of prostitution, he remained popular to the people of Cairo as an activist and a journalist. He held many high-status positions in the Bureau until 1915.

== Death ==
Scott died on January 23, 1917, in Springfield, Illinois.
