= 29th Texas Legislature =

1905 meeting of the Texas legislature

←	28th	30th	→
- The Seal of Texas

Overview
- Legislative body: Texas State Legislature
- Jurisdiction: Texas
- Term: January 10, 1905 – April 15, 1905
- Election: 1904 general election

Senate
- Members: 31
- President of the Senate: George D. Neal (D)
- President pro tempore: W. A. Hanger (D–30) (regular session) * John G. Willacy (D–23); Elected in the absence of Lieutenant Governor Neal and President Pro Tem Hanger; as "President Pro Tem. ad interim" and 1st Called Session * J. J. Faulk (D–9); 2nd Called Session
- Party control: Democrat

House of Representatives
- Members: 131
- Speaker: Francis William Seabury (D–85)
- Party control: Democrat

Sessions
- 1st: January 10, 1905 – April 15, 1905
- 2nd: April 15, 1905 – May 14, 1905
- 3rd: March 26, 1906 – April 3, 1906

The 29th Texas Legislature was a meeting of the legislative branch of the U.S. state of Texas, composed of the Texas Senate and the Texas House of Representatives. The Texas State Legislature met in Austin, Texas, from January 10, 1905, to April 15, 1905.

== Party summary ==
=== House of Representatives ===
Affiliation	Members	Note
Democratic Party	128	
Republican Party	2	
Other	1	
Total	131	

=== Senate ===
Affiliation	Members	Note
Democratic Party	31	
Republican Party	0	
Other	0	
Total	31	

== Major events ==
- January 10, 1905 – Legislature convenes at noon

== Major legislation ==
=== Enacted ===
- Banking Legislation - Created a system of corporate chartering, regulation, and supervision of state banks as authorized by constitutional amendment of 1904 to the office of the Commissioner of Agriculture, Insurance, Statistics, and History
