= 22nd Texas Legislature =

The 22nd Texas Legislature met from January 13 to April 13, 1891, in regular session, and from March 14 to April 12, 1892, in a called session. All members of the House of Representatives and a portion of the members of the Senate were elected in the 1890 general election.

During this legislative term, James Stephen Hogg was Governor, George Cassety Pendleton was Lieutenant Governor, and Robert Teague Milner served as Speaker of the House.

== Sessions ==
- 22nd Regular session: January 13, 1891 – April 13, 1891
- 22nd First called session: March 14, 1892 – April 12, 1892
