= 2023 Texas elections =

- November 7, 2023

Elections were held in Texas on November 7, 2023.

Texas voters statewide voted on 14 proposed amendments to the Texas Constitution. A special election took place to fill the vacancy from Texas's 2nd House of Representatives district, which was followed by a runoff on January 30, 2024. In addition, Texas counties, cities, and school and other special districts had local elections and other ballot issues, such as bond proposals.

== State ==
=== Ballot measures ===
14 proposed amendments to the Texas Constitution appeared on the November 7, 2023 general election ballot in Texas.

- Proposition 1 protected the "right to engage in farming, ranching, timber production, horticulture, and wildlife management". Yes Passed
- Proposition 2 provided an exemption from county and municipal property taxes for "all or part of the appraised value of real property used to operate a child-care facility". Yes Passed
- Proposition 3 prohibited any future imposition of a wealth tax. Yes Passed
- Proposition 4 made numerous changes to property tax calculation, notably an increase in the homestead exemption from school property taxes from $40,000 to $100,000, and would also add voter-elected members to larger county appraisal districts. Yes Passed
- Proposition 5 created the Texas University Fund, which would provide a dedicated funding mechanism for universities that aren't part of either the University of Texas System or the Texas A&M University System but which have achieved "national prominence as research universities". Yes Passed
- Proposition 6 created a new dedicated water fund to assist in various water projects. Yes Passed
- Proposition 7 created a new dedicated energy fund "to support the construction, maintenance, modernization, and operation of electric generating facilities". Yes Passed
- Proposition 8 created a new dedicated broadband fund "to expand high-speed broadband access and assist in the financing of connectivity projects". Yes Passed
- Proposition 9 authorized a cost-of-living adjustment to certain annuitants of the Teacher Retirement System of Texas. Yes Passed
- Proposition 10 provided an exemption from property taxes for "equipment or inventory held by a manufacturer of medical or biomedical products to protect the Texas healthcare network and strengthen our medical supply chain". Yes Passed
- Proposition 11 permitted conservation and reclamation districts in El Paso County to issue bonds supported by ad valorem taxes to fund the development and maintenance of parks and recreational facilities. Yes Passed
- Proposition 12 abolished the office of County Treasurer in Galveston County (the text of the amendment requires not only the approval of a majority of voters statewide, but also a majority of voters within Galveston County). Yes Passed
- Proposition 13 would have increased the mandatory retirement age for state justices and judges. No Defeated
- Proposition 14 created a new dedicated parks fund (the "centennial parks conservation fund") for the creation and improvement of state parks. Yes Passed

== Special elections ==
=== 2023 Texas's 2nd House of Representatives district special election ===
2023 Texas's 2nd House of Representatives district special election (runoff)
- January 30, 2024

Texas's 2nd House of Representatives district

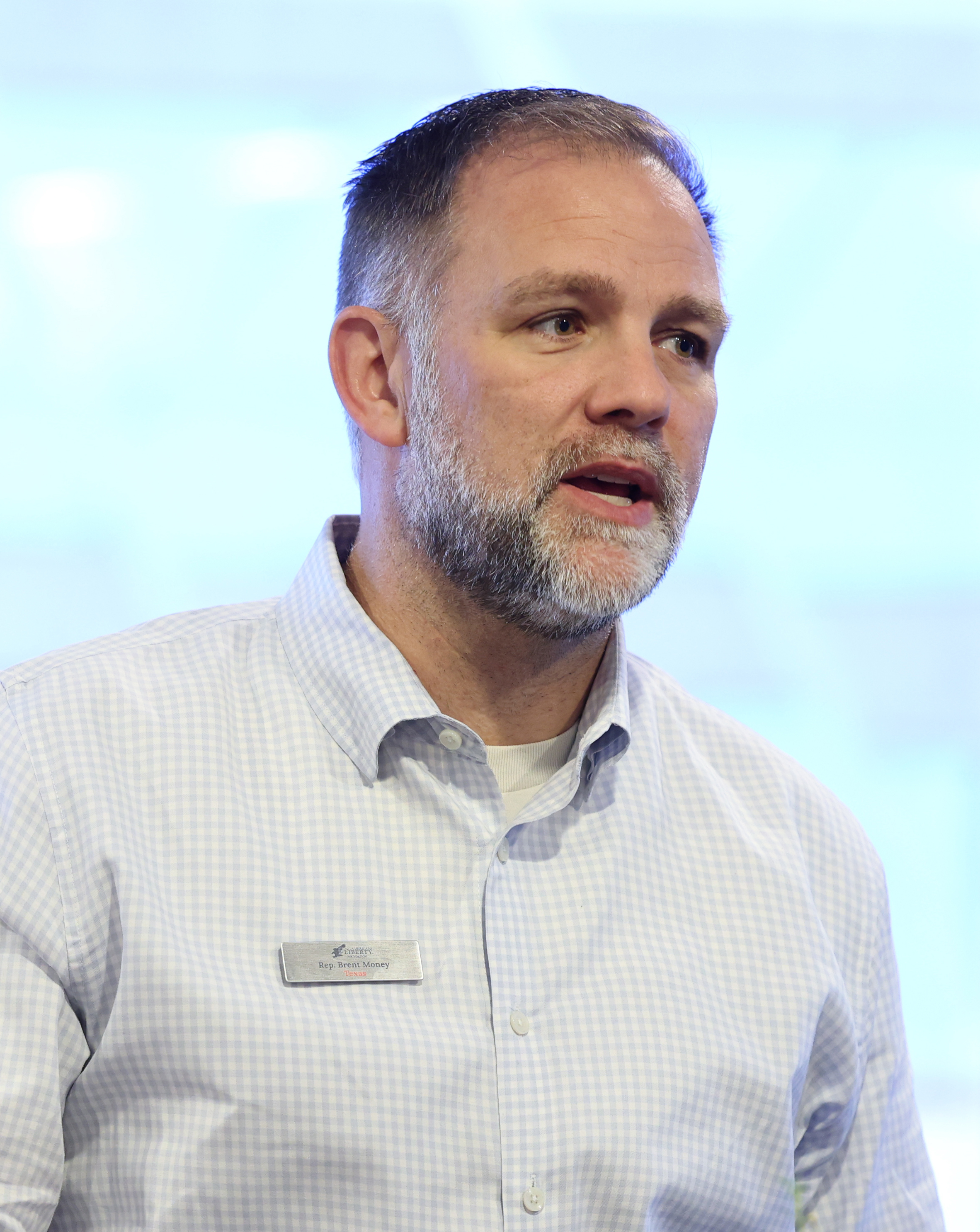
Candidate	Jill Dutton	Brent Money
Party	Republican	Republican
First round	7,132; 25.3%	8,965; 31.7%
Runoff	6,830; 50.4%	6,719; 49.6%
Representative before election
Bryan Slaton
Texas Republican Party
Elected Representative
Jill Dutton
Texas Republican Party

A special election took place in Texas's 2nd House of Representatives district to fill the vacancy created by the expulsion of Bryan Slaton. Slaton resigned from the seat on May 8, 2023, amid a sexual misconduct controversy and was subsequently expelled from the House. As no candidate reached the necessary 50% votes for victory in the November 7 election, Greg Abbott set January 30, 2024 as the date for the runoff election between Brent Money and Jill Dutton. Dutton defeated Money in the runoff by 111 votes.

==== November 7, 2023 ====
===== Candidates =====
====== Declared ======
- Kristen Washington (Democratic), former member of the Greenville City Council
- Jill Dutton (Republican), trustee for the Van Independent School District
- Heath Hyde (Republican), farmer
- Brent Money (Republican), member of the Greenville City Council.
- Doug Roszhart (Republican), member of the Greenville City Council
- Krista Schild (Republican), state convention delegate

====== Withdrew ======
- Neal Barker (Republican), former board member and treasurer of the Northeast Texas Rural Rail Transportation District

===== Endorsements =====
Jill Dutton

Executive branch officials

- Rick Perry, former United States Secretary of Energy (2017–2019) and former Governor of Texas (2000–2015)

State legislators

- Dade Phelan, Speaker of the Texas House of Representatives (2021–present) from the 21st district (2015–present)
Brent Money

Statewide officials

- Greg Abbott, Governor of Texas (2015–present)
- Ken Paxton, Attorney General of Texas (2015–present)

===== Results =====
Texas House of Representatives 2nd district special election, November 7, 2023
Party	Candidate	Votes	%
Republican	Brent Money	8,965	31.7%
Republican	Jill Dutton	7,132	25.3%
Republican	Heath Hyde	6,065	21.5%
Democratic	Kristen Washington	3,156	11.2%
Republican	Doug Roszhart	2,204	7.8%
Republican	Krista Schild	715	2.5%
Total votes		28,237	100.00%

==== January 30, 2024 (Runoff) ====
Texas House of Representatives 2nd district special election, January 30, 2024 (Runoff)
Party	Candidate	Votes	%
Republican	Jill Dutton	6,830	50.41%
Republican	Brent Money	6,719	49.59%
Total votes		13,549	100.00%

== Local ==
Ron Nirenberg, incumbent mayor of San Antonio, was re-elected. John Whitmire won the open mayoral seat in Houston.

== See also ==
- 2023 United States state legislative elections
