= 88th Texas Legislature =

2023 meeting of the Texas legislature

←	87th	89th	→
- The Seal of Texas

Overview
- Legislative body: Texas State Legislature
- Jurisdiction: Texas
- Term: January 10, 2023 – May 29, 2023
- Election: 2022 general election

Senate
- Members: 31
- President of the Senate: Dan Patrick (R)
- President pro tempore: Kelly Hancock (R–9) (Regular Session) * Charles Schwertner (R–5) (Ad Interim)
- Party control: Republican

House of Representatives
- Members: 150
- Speaker: Dade Phelan (R–21)
- Speaker Pro Tempore: Charlie Geren (R–99)
- Party control: Republican

Sessions
- 1st: May 29, 2023 – Jun 27, 2023
- 2nd: Jun 27, 2023 – Jul 13, 2023
- 3rd: October 9, 2023 – November 7, 2023
- 4th: November 7, 2023 – December 5, 2023

The 88th Texas Legislature was a meeting of the legislative branch of the U.S. state of Texas, composed of the Texas Senate and the Texas House of Representatives. The Texas State Legislature met in its regular session in Austin, Texas, from January 10, 2023 to May 29, 2023, followed by four called sessions.

All seats in the state house and 16 seats in the state senate were up for election in November 2022, with seats apportioned among the 2020 United States census. The Republican Party preserved their majority in both chambers.

== Major events ==
- January 10, 2023 – Legislature convenes at noon (CST).
- March 6, 2023 – State representative Bryan Slaton introduces the Texas Independence Referendum Act which, if passed, would call for a state referendum on the secession of Texas from the United States. The bill would later fail to get out of committee before the end of the regular session.
- April 20, 2023 – The Texas Senate passes a bill that would require that the Ten Commandments be displayed in every classroom of every public school in Texas. The bill would later fail to pass the Texas House of Representatives.
- May 9, 2023 – The Texas House of Representatives votes unanimously to expel Bryan Slaton from House District 2 following an investigation that determined he had engaged in inappropriate sexual conduct with an aide.
- May 27, 2023 – In a 121-23 vote, the Texas House of Representatives votes to impeach Attorney General Ken Paxton, the third impeachment in the state's history. (He would later be acquitted by the Texas Senate of all articles of impeachment following a trial in September 2023.)
- May 29, 2023
  - Legislature adjourns.
  - 88th Legislature 1st Called Session convenes.
- June 27, 2023
  - Legislature adjourns 1st special session.
  - 88th Legislature 2nd Called Session convenes.
- July 13, 2023 – Legislature adjourns 2nd special session.
- October 9, 2023 – 88th Legislature 3rd Called Session convenes.
- November 7, 2023
  - Legislature adjourns 3rd special session.
  - 88th Legislature 4th Called Session convenes.
- December 5, 2023 – Legislature adjourns 4th special session.

== Major legislation ==
=== Enacted ===
- House bills
  - HB 3: Requires all school campuses to have an armed security officer present, in addition to other security hardening measures.
- Senate bills
  - SB 14: Prohibits doctors from prescribing gender-affirming care to transgender minors.
  - SB 17: Bans diversity, equity and inclusion offices at universities.
  - SB 763: Allows school districts to hire or volunteer chaplains for mental health support for students.

=== Proposed (but not enacted) ===
- House bills
  - HB 3596: The Texas Independence Referendum Act which would call for a state referendum on the secession of Texas from the United States.
