= Texas's 3rd House of Representatives district =

American legislative district

Texas's 3rd State House of Representatives district
Representative
Cecil Bell Jr. R–Magnolia
- Demographics: 59.7% White; 4.7% Black; 29.7% Hispanic; 3.5% Asian; 2.4% Other
- Population (2020) • Voting age: 202,477; 147,859

District 3 is a district in the Texas House of Representatives. It was created in the 3rd legislature (1849–1851).

The district has been represented by Republican Cecil Bell Jr. since January 8, 2013, upon his initial election to the Texas House.

As a result of redistricting after the 2020 Federal census, from the 2022 elections the district encompasses southwestern, and portions of southeastern and south central, Montgomery County. Major cities in the district include all of Magnolia and Stagecoach, and a portion of Conroe.

== List of representatives ==
Leg.	Representative	Party	Term start	Term end	Represented counties
3rd	James S. Gillett	Unknown	November 5, 1849	November 3, 1851	Lamar
4th	William F. Evans	Unknown	November 3, 1851	November 7, 1853	Jefferson, Liberty, Polk, Tyler
5th	John H. Fowler	Unknown	November 7, 1853	November 5, 1855	Lamar
5th	Jacob Lyday	Unknown	November 7, 1853	November 5, 1855	Lamar
6th	W. J. Bonner	Unknown	November 5, 1855	November 2, 1857	Lamar
6th	William M. Williams	Unknown	November 5, 1855	November 2, 1857	Lamar
7th	John H. Crook	Unknown	November 2, 1857	November 7, 1859	Lamar
7th	Eli J. Shelton	Unknown	November 2, 1857	November 7, 1859	Lamar
8th	Eli J. Shelton	Unknown	November 7, 1859	November 4, 1861	Lamar
8th	Micajah L. Armstrong	Unknown	November 7, 1859	November 4, 1861	Lamar
9th	John T. Bean	Unknown	November 4, 1861	March 1, 1862	Hardin, Tyler
9th	Napoleon B. Charlton	Unknown	February 6, 1863	November 2, 1863	Hardin, Tyler
10th	James W. Barclay, Sr.	Unknown	November 2, 1863	August 6, 1866	Hardin, Tyler
11th	Charles H. Jones	Unknown	August 6, 1866	February 7, 1870	Hardin, Tyler
12th	A. D. Elam	Democratic	November 30, 1869	February 14, 1870	Cherokee, Houston
12th	A. D. Elam	Democratic	January 10, 1871	April 17, 1871	Cherokee, Houston
12th	A. D. Elam	Democratic	October 31, 1871	January 14, 1873	Cherokee, Houston
12th	Leroy W. Cooper	Republican	February 8, 1870	August 15, 1870	Cherokee, Houston
12th	James R. Burnett	Republican	February 15, 1870	January 11, 1871	Cherokee, Houston
12th	Matthew A. Gaston	Democratic	February 8, 1870	January 14, 1873	Cherokee, Houston
12th	John C. English	Democratic	January 11, 1871	April 17, 1871	Cherokee, Houston
12th	Frank Rainey	Democratic	October 31, 1871	January 14, 1873	Cherokee, Houston
13th	Frank Rainey	Democratic	January 14, 1873	January 13, 1874	Cherokee, Houston
13th	U. G. M. Walker	Democratic	January 14, 1873	January 13, 1874	Cherokee, Houston
13th	John T. Smith	Democratic	January 14, 1873	January 13, 1874	Cherokee, Houston
14th	John T. Smith	Democratic	January 13, 1874	February 16, 1874	Angelina, Cherokee, Houston, Trinity
14th	Washington L. Denman	Democratic	January 13, 1874	April 18, 1876	Angelina, Cherokee, Houston, Trinity
14th	William W. Davis	Democratic	January 12, 1875	April 18, 1876	Angelina, Cherokee, Houston, Trinity
14th	John H. Stuart	Democratic	January 12, 1875	April 18, 1876	Angelina, Cherokee, Houston, Trinity
15th	Thomas M. Stone	Democratic	April 18, 1876	January 14, 1879	Jasper, Newton, Orange
16th	Thomas W. Ford	Democratic	January 14, 1879	January 11, 1881	Jasper, Newton, Orange
17th	Stephen Chanault	Democratic	January 11, 1881	January 9, 1883	Jasper, Newton, Orange
18th	James Lee	Democratic	January 9, 1883	January 13, 1885	Jasper, Newton, Tyler
19th	Robert J. Brailsford	Democratic	January 13, 1885	January 11, 1887	Jasper, Newton, Tyler
20th	Delaney E. Tompkins	Democratic	January 11, 1887	January 8, 1889	Jasper, Newton, Tyler
21st	Henry R. Ralph	Democratic	January 8, 1889	January 13, 1891	Jasper, Newton, Tyler
22nd	Charles E. Cade	Democratic	January 13, 1891	January 10, 1893	Jasper, Newton, Tyler
23rd	Thomas D. Rowell Sr.	Democratic	January 10, 1893	January 8, 1895	Bowie, Cass, Marion
24th	William T. Armistead	Democratic	January 8, 1895	January 12, 1897	Bowie, Cass, Marion, Morris
25th	A. B. Flint	Democratic	January 12, 1897	January 10, 1899	Bowie, Cass, Marion
26th	Louis S. Schluter	Democratic	January 10, 1899	January 8, 1901	Bowie, Cass, Marion
27th	Louis S. Schluter	Democratic	January 8, 1901	January 13, 1903	Bowie, Cass, Marion
28th	John W. Bolin	Democratic	January 13, 1903	July 27, 1904	Morris, Red River, Titus
28th	Vacant	N/A	July 27, 1904	January 10, 1905	Morris, Red River, Titus
29th	M. G. Black	Democratic	January 10, 1905	January 8, 1907	Morris, Red River, Titus
30th	John M. Henderson	Democratic	January 8, 1907	January 12, 1909	Morris, Red River, Titus
31st	Phillip B. Branch	Democratic	January 12, 1909	January 10, 1911	Morris, Red River, Titus
32nd	T. R. Bolin	Democratic	January 10, 1911	January 14, 1913	Morris, Red River, Titus
33rd	Thomas D. Rowell Sr.	Democratic	January 14, 1913	January 12, 1915	Bowie, Cass, Marion
34th	Thomas D. Rowell Sr.	Democratic	January 12, 1915	October 19, 1916	Bowie, Cass, Marion
34th	Vacant	N/A	October 19, 1916	January 9, 1917	Bowie, Cass, Marion
35th	Joseph A. Dodd	Democratic	January 9, 1917	January 14, 1919	Bowie, Cass, Marion
36th	Joseph A. Dodd	Democratic	January 14, 1919	January 11, 1921	Bowie, Cass, Marion
37th	Peter G. Henderson	Democratic	January 11, 1921	January 9, 1923	Bowie, Cass, Marion
38th	Peter G. Henderson	Democratic	January 9, 1923	January 13, 1925	Bowie, Cass, Marion
39th	Thomas D. Rowell Jr.	Democratic	January 13, 1925	January 11, 1927	Bowie, Cass, Marion
40th	Thomas D. Rowell Jr.	Democratic	January 11, 1927	January 19, 1928	Bowie, Cass, Marion
40th	Vacant	N/A	January 19, 1928	January 8, 1929	Bowie, Cass, Marion
41st	Robert M. Hubbard	Democratic	January 8, 1929	January 13, 1931	Bowie, Cass, Marion
42nd	Robert M. Hubbard	Democratic	January 13, 1931	January 10, 1933	Bowie, Cass, Marion
43rd	E. H. Beck	Democratic	January 10, 1933	January 8, 1935	Bowie, Cass, Marion
44th	E. H. Beck	Democratic	January 8, 1935	March 25, 1936	Bowie, Cass, Marion
44th	Vacant	N/A	March 25, 1936	September 25, 1936	Bowie, Cass, Marion
44th	George H. Harper	Democratic	September 25, 1936	January 12, 1937	Bowie, Cass, Marion
45th	George H. Harper	Democratic	January 12, 1937	January 10, 1939	Bowie, Cass, Marion
46th	George H. Harper	Democratic	January 10, 1939	November 27, 1940	Bowie, Cass, Marion
46th	Vacant	N/A	November 27, 1940	January 14, 1941	Bowie, Cass, Marion
47th	Newton W. McCann	Democratic	January 14, 1941	January 12, 1943	Bowie, Cass, Marion
48th	Newton W. McCann	Democratic	January 12, 1943	January 9, 1945	Bowie, Cass, Marion
49th	John P. Fant	Democratic	January 9, 1945	January 14, 1947	Bowie, Cass, Marion
50th	John P. Fant	Democratic	January 14, 1947	May 27, 1947	Bowie, Cass, Marion
50th	Vacant	N/A	May 27, 1947	August 23, 1947	Bowie, Cass, Marion
50th	Newton W. McCann	Democratic	August 23, 1947	January 11, 1949	Bowie, Cass, Marion
51st	Newton W. McCann	Democratic	January 11, 1949	January 9, 1951	Bowie, Cass, Marion
52nd	Newton W. McCann	Democratic	January 9, 1951	January 13, 1953	Bowie, Cass, Marion
53rd	Benjamin P. Brooks	Democratic	January 13, 1953	August 2, 1953	Camp, Red River, Titus
53rd	Vacant	N/A	August 2, 1953	March 15, 1954	Camp, Red River, Titus
53rd	George D. Ford	Democratic	March 15, 1954	January 11, 1955	Camp, Red River, Titus
54th	George D. Ford	Democratic	January 11, 1955	January 8, 1957	Camp, Red River, Titus
55th	George D. Ford	Democratic	January 8, 1957	January 13, 1959	Camp, Red River, Titus
56th	James Verne Adams	Democratic	January 13, 1959	January 13, 1961	Camp, Red River, Titus
57th	James Verne Adams	Democratic	January 13, 1961	January 8, 1963	Camp, Red River, Titus
58th	Lonnie N. Cowles	Democratic	January 8, 1963	January 12, 1965	Harrison
59th	Lonnie N. Cowles	Democratic	January 12, 1965	January 10, 1967	Harrison
60th	Cread L. Ray, Jr.	Democratic	January 10, 1967	January 14, 1969	Harrison, Panola
61st	Cread L. Ray, Jr.	Democratic	January 14, 1969	January 12, 1971	Harrison, Panola
62nd	Benjamin Z. Grant	Democratic	January 12, 1971	January 9, 1973	Harrison, Panola
63rd	Benjamin Z. Grant	Democratic	January 9, 1973	January 14, 1975	Harrison, Rusk
64th	Benjamin Z. Grant	Democratic	January 14, 1975	January 11, 1977	Harrison, Rusk
65th	Benjamin Z. Grant	Democratic	January 11, 1977	January 9, 1979	Harrison, Rusk
66th	Benjamin Z. Grant	Democratic	January 9, 1979	January 13, 1981	Harrison, Rusk
67th	James P. McWilliams	Democratic	January 13, 1981	January 11, 1983	Harrison, Rusk
68th	Smith E. Gilley	Democratic	January 11, 1983	January 8, 1985	Hunt, Rains, Rockwall, Wood
69th	Smith E. Gilley	Democratic	January 8, 1985	January 13, 1987	Hunt, Rains, Rockwall, Wood
70th	Alexander M. Aikin III	Democratic	January 13, 1987	January 10, 1989	Hunt, Rains, Rockwall, Wood
71st	William N. Thomas	Republican	January 10, 1989	January 8, 1991	Hunt, Rains, Rockwall, Wood
72nd	William N. Thomas	Republican	January 8, 1991	January 12, 1993	Hunt, Rains, Rockwall, Wood
73rd	Lyndon P. Patterson	Democratic	January 12, 1993	January 10, 1995	Delta, Fannin, Hopkins, Lamar, Rains
74th	Lyndon P. Patterson	Democratic	January 10, 1995	January 14, 1997	Delta, Fannin, Hopkins, Lamar, Rains
75th	Lyndon P. Patterson	Democratic	January 14, 1997	January 12, 1999	Delta, Fannin, Hopkins, Lamar, Rains
76th	Mark S. Homer	Democratic	January 12, 1999	January 9, 2001	Delta, Fannin, Hopkins, Lamar, Rains
77th	Mark S. Homer	Democratic	January 9, 2001	January 14, 2003	Delta, Fannin, Hopkins, Lamar, Rains
78th	Mark S. Homer	Democratic	January 14, 2003	January 11, 2005	Delta, Fannin, Hopkins, Lamar, Red River, Titus
79th	Mark S. Homer	Democratic	January 11, 2005	January 9, 2007	Delta, Fannin, Hopkins, Lamar, Red River, Titus
80th	Mark S. Homer	Democratic	January 9, 2007	January 13, 2009	Delta, Fannin, Hopkins, Lamar, Red River, Titus
81st	Mark S. Homer	Democratic	January 13, 2009	January 11, 2011	Delta, Fannin, Hopkins, Lamar, Red River, Titus
82nd	Erwin Cain	Republican	January 11, 2011	January 8, 2013	Delta, Fannin, Hopkins, Lamar, Red River, Titus
83rd	Cecil Bell Jr.	Republican	January 8, 2013	January 13, 2015	Montgomery, Waller
84th	Cecil Bell Jr.	Republican	January 13, 2015	January 10, 2017	Montgomery, Waller
85th	Cecil Bell Jr.	Republican	January 10, 2017	January 8, 2019	Montgomery, Waller
86th	Cecil Bell Jr.	Republican	January 8, 2019	January 12, 2021	Montgomery, Waller
87th	Cecil Bell Jr.	Republican	January 12, 2021	January 10, 2023	Montgomery, Waller
88th	Cecil Bell Jr.	Republican	January 10, 2023	January 14, 2025	Montgomery
89th	Cecil Bell Jr.	Republican	January 14, 2025	Present	Montgomery
