= James Verne Adams =

American politician

Member of the Texas House of Representatives from the 3rd district
- In office January 13, 1959 – January 8, 1963
- Preceded by: George D. Ford
- Succeeded by: Nelson Cowles

Personal details
- Born: January 31, 1914
- Died: May 19, 2000 (aged 86)
- Party: Democratic

James Verne Adams (January 31, 1914 – May 19, 2000) was an American politician. He served as a Democratic member for the 3rd district of the Texas House of Representatives.
