= John P. Mabry =

American politician (born 1969)

John Porter Mabry, Jr. (born May 7, 1969, in Austin, Texas) is a Texas politician who served as a Democrat in the Texas House of Representatives during the Seventy-eighth Texas Legislature. Mabry was a member of the Killer Ds, the Democratic representatives who prevented the House from achieving a quorum in May 2003, thus blocking regular session consideration of congressional redistricting.

He holds a law degree from Baylor University.

Preceded by Holt Getterman	Member of the Texas House of Representatives from District 56 (Waco); 2003–2005	Succeeded by Charles "Doc" Anderson
