= Geanie Morrison =

Texas state legislator (born 1950)

Member of the Texas House of Representatives from the 30th district
- In office January 12, 1999 – January 14, 2025
- Preceded by: Steve Holzheauser
- Succeeded by: AJ Louderback

Personal details
- Born: October 6, 1950 (age 75)
- Party: Republican
- Spouse: Jack Morrison Jr.
- Children: 2

Geanie Williams Morrison (born October 6, 1950) is an American politician from Victoria, Texas. A Republican, she represented the 30th district in the Texas House of Representatives from 1999 to 2025.

== Personal life ==
Morrison attended Victoria College. She has two children and two grandchildren with her husband Jack.

== Career ==
Before serving in the House of Representatives, Morrison served as the executive director of the Governor's Commission for Women. She was appointed by then-Governor George W. Bush to the Texas Commission for Volunteerism and Community Service and the Texas Juvenile Probation Commission. Morrison is a sustaining member and former President of the Junior League of Victoria, TX.

== Legislative career ==
In 1999, Morrison introduced legislation creating the Safe-haven law. This law decriminalizes the leaving of unharmed infants with statutorily designated private persons so that the child becomes a ward of the state in order to eliminate child abandonment. Morrison's legislation became a blueprint and by 2008 similar laws were adopted across the country.

Morrison was the first chairperson of the Environmental Regulation Committee when it was created in 2015. As part of her work on the committee, she championed a bill that weakened environmental protections in an effort to encourage employers to move to Texas or to stay in the state.

In 2018, she was elected to the 86th legislature with 74.7% of the vote, beating Robin Hayter. Morrison served on the Culture, Recreation & Tourism Committee, the Environmental Regulation Committee, the Mass Violence Prevention & Community Safety Committee, and chaired the Local & Consent Calendars Committee. She represented parts of Aransas, Calhoun, De Witt, Goliad, Refugio, and Victoria counties.

Morrison had a primary challenger but was unopposed in the 2020 general election. She briefly was in the running to become Speaker of the House for the 87th legislature, but withdrew after only a week, throwing her support to Dade Phelan. Later, she put her name back into contention for the speakership. Her office was involved in removing a statue of a Confederate soldier in 2020.

On May 27, 2023, Morrison voted against impeaching Ken Paxton. She was succeeded by AJ Louderback in 2024.
