= Texas Independence Referendum Act =

Failed Texas legislation on Texas' secession from the United States

Texas Legislature
- Long title: An act relating to proposing a referendum to the people of the State of Texas on the question of whether this state should reassert its status as an independent nation.
- Citation: HB 3596
- Introduced by: Bryan Slaton (R–2)
- Status: Not passed

The Texas Independence Referendum Act (HB 3596), commonly shortened to TEXIT, was a failed Texas state legislation which, if passed, would have called for a state referendum on the secession of Texas from the United States. While prior versions of the legislation have been introduced under similar titles, this most recent version was introduced by state representative Bryan Slaton on March 6, 2023. The bill failed to get out of committee before the end of the regular session.

== Background ==
In December 2020, when the Supreme Court refused to hear Texas' lawsuit in Texas v. Pennsylvania, the chair of the Texas GOP, Allen West, suggested that Texas and other like-minded states could leave the Union. In 2022, the Republican Party of Texas added a statement in its party platform that called for a referendum over secession in 2023.

Texan secession from the United States is noted as a fringe but popular movement within the Lone Star state, especially with "Texit" becoming a popular rallying slogan. As early as 2016, it was noted that 212,000 accounts had "liked" a Facebook page focused on Texan secession.

=== 2021 bill ===
On January 26, 2021, the first version of the Texas Independence Referendum Act (HB 1359), a bill to provide for a nonbinding statewide referendum on secession, was filed by Texas House member Kyle Biedermann. The bill was referred to the State Affairs committee but it was never given a hearing or voted on by the committee before the end of the session.

== Provisions ==
If passed by the legislature and signed by the governor, the legislation calls for the 2023 general election in Texas to include a referendum on whether the state should secede from the Union. The proposed legislation outlines that the referendum will be listed under "Referendum Proposition". If the bill succeeds, the state will form a committee tasked with planning the next steps in the state seceding from the Union. The committee is designated specifically to make recommendations on amendments to the Constitution of Texas, creating new elected offices, renaming the state, and other procedures for the building of a nation. The legislation specifically recommends free trade agreements, a temporary currency union, and a common travel agreement. The committee would have been abolished once the calendar year of 2025 begins.

== Legislative history ==
The bill was introduced on March 6, 2023, the 187th anniversary of the Battle of the Alamo. Like the previous version of the bill, HB 3596 was referred to the State Affairs Committee but was never given a hearing or voted on by the committee before the end of the session.

== Support and opposition ==
The point has been raised that Texas v. White, the 1869 Supreme Court case which ruled that unilateral secession from the United States is illegal, would prevent the enactment of the Texas Independent Referendum Act.

Proponents supporting the act, including Biedermann and Slaton, all state that the people of Texas should be given the right to vote on whether they wish to stay in the Union. Upon introducing the 2023 bill, Slaton further stated that the state constitution is "clear that all political power resides in the people". Slaton further alleges "decades of continuous abuse of our rights and liberties by the federal government". Proponents have also stated that the Texan people have a right to self-determination and a “forced union is not what Texans want”.
