= Louderback =

Louderback is a surname. Notable people with the surname include:

- AJ Louderback, American politician
- David S. Louderback (1851–1911), American politician
- George Louderback (1874–1957), American geologist
- Harold Louderback (1881–1941), American judge
- Jim Louderback (born 1961), American businessman
- Tom Louderback (1933–2020), American football player
