= Thomas Donald Ramsay =

American politician

Member of the Texas House of Representatives from the 2nd district
- In office January 12, 1993 – January 14, 2003
- Preceded by: Lyndon Pete Patterson
- Succeeded by: Dan Flynn

Member of the Texas House of Representatives from the 8th district
- In office November 10, 1992 – January 12, 1993
- Preceded by: Sam W. Russell
- Succeeded by: Paul Sadler

Personal details
- Born: December 14, 1939 Mount Vernon, Texas, U.S.
- Died: July 9, 2022 (aged 82) Franklin County, Texas, U.S.
- Party: Democratic
- Spouse: Laurie Lynn Manning
- Children: 4
- Education: Southern Methodist University
- Occupation: Broker

Thomas Donald Ramsay, known as Tom Ramsay (December 14, 1939 – July 9, 2022), was a Texas state representative, who represented Districts 8 and 2 from 1992 to 2003 as a Democrat. He did not seek reelection in 2002 and was succeeded by the Republican Dan Flynn.

== Life ==
Ramsay was born in Mount Vernon, Texas, to T. Landon Ramsay and Mozelle Coe. In 1962, he earned a bachelor's degree in business administration from Southern Methodist University. He married Laurie Lynn Manning and had four children together.

Before being elected to the State House, he was a real estate developer and a member of the Mount Vernon school board. He served in the Texas Air National Guard for six years and was a founder of the Franklin National Bank.

Ramsay died on July 9, 2022. He was survived by his wife and four children.

Party political offices
Preceded by L.P. "Pete" Patterson	Democratic nominee for Agriculture Commissioner of Texas; 2002	Succeeded by Hank Gilbert
