= Charles Anderson (Texas politician) =

Texas veterinarian and state legislator

Charles "Doc" Anderson

Member of the Texas House of Representatives from the 56th district
- In office January 11, 2005 – August 15, 2024
- Preceded by: John P. Mabry
- Succeeded by: Pat Curry

Personal details
- Born: June 29, 1945 (age 81)
- Party: Republican
- Spouse: Lyn Sullivan
- Children: 1
- Education: Texas A&M University (BVSc, DVM)
- Occupation: Veterinarian

Charles N. "Doc" Anderson (born June 29, 1945) is a veterinarian from Waco, Texas, who was a Republican member of the Texas House of Representatives for District 56. The district encompasses Waco and most of McLennan County. He was first elected in 2004.

== Early life ==
A graduate of the Texas A&M University School of Veterinary Medicine in College Station, Anderson has been a small animal veterinarian in Waco since 1981.

Anderson began his involvement in the political process as an advocate for small business. He served on committees for the Texas Association of Business and the National Federation of Independent Businesses and was appointed to the Texas Small Business Advisory Council by former Governor Rick Perry. In 1998 and 2000, he represented Texas as a delegate to the Congressional Small Business Summit in Washington, D.C.

== Texas House of Representatives ==
Anderson served on the Pensions, Investments & Financial Services Committee and the Rules & Resolution Committee. He was vice-chairman of the Agriculture and Livestock committee. Additionally, he was appointed to the statewide Agricultural Policy Council, the multinational Energy Council, and the National Conference of State Legislatures Committee on Agriculture, Energy, and the Environment. Anderson served on the Community College Caucus, Rural Caucus, Veteran Caucus, Clean Air Caucus, Republican Caucus, and the Texas Conservative Coalition.

Anderson introduced major legislation concerning school bus safety belts, Jessica's Law, and a constitutional amendment to require a two-thirds vote of the legislature to raise the 1 percent business franchise tax. In his first term, he successfully obtained partial funding for the construction of the new Company F Headquarters for the Texas Rangers Division, which houses a public education center for the Rangers. During the 81st session, Anderson worked to secure funding for the Waco skate park and Texas State Technical College in Waco. Anderson has also been a leader in community organizations and in the veterinary medicine profession.

In 2008, Anderson won the Republican renomination for his third term in the House by defeating Jonathan Sibley, a son of former State Senator David McAdams Sibley, Sr., also of Waco.

In 2024, Anderson announced his intention not to seek re-election to his seat. On August 15, 2024, he announced his early resignation from the Texas House effective immediately and requested a special election be called to fill the remainder of his term.

== Personal life ==
He and his wife, Sandie, have one son and one grandson. He resides in Lorena, south of Waco.

Texas House of Representatives
Preceded by John P. Mabry 2003-2005	Texas State Representative for District 56 (McLennan County); 2005-2024	Succeeded by Pat Curry
