= Edward Patton =

American politician

Edward A. "Ed" Patton
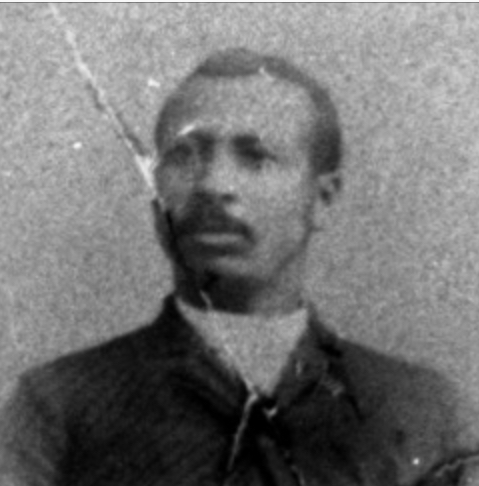

Member of the Texas House of Representatives from the 2nd district
- In office January 13, 1891 – January 10, 1893
- Preceded by: Travis S. Cochran
- Succeeded by: Daniel D. Dodd

Personal details
- Born: c. 1859
- Party: Republican
- Occupation: Teacher, farmer, politician

Edward A. "Ed" Patton (born c. 1859 – ?) was an American educator, farmer and politician. A Republican who resided in Evergreen, he represented San Jacinto and Polk counties in the Texas House of Representatives during the Twenty-second Texas Legislature. At the time of his election, he was the sole Black member of the legislature.

He served on the Education Committee in the House and worked for appropriations for the Prairie View State Normal School. Among other stances, he supported the establishment of the Railroad Commission of Texas, opposed the establishment of a poll tax, and worked to relieve property taxes on landowners in his district whose lands suffered from flooding. However, he also supported a ban on interracial marriages and supported the Texas Confederate Home for Confederate veterans.

After serving a term in the Texas House, Patton later moved to Washington, D.C. by 1920, where he worked for the federal government. His granddaughter Arlyne Patten was the mother of Barbara Jordan, who would become the first Black member of the Texas Senate since 1893 and then the first Black woman to represent a Southern state in the United States House of Representatives.

== See also ==
- African American officeholders from the end of the Civil War until before 1900
