= Four Price =

American politician and lawyer (born 1967)

Member of the Texas House of Representatives from the 87th district
- In office January 11, 2011 – January 14, 2025
- Preceded by: David Swinford
- Succeeded by: Caroline Fairly

Personal details
- Born: Walter Thomas Price IV; October 8, 1967 (age 58) Amarillo, Texas, US
- Party: Republican
- Spouse: Karen (m. 2003)
- Children: 4
- Education: Tascosa High School University of Texas at Austin St. Mary's University School of Law
- Occupation: Attorney
- Website: Campaign website

Walter Thomas Price IV, known as Four Price (born October 8, 1967), is an American politician and a former Republican member of the Texas House of Representatives for the 87th district.

== Election history ==
Price ran without opposition in the general election held on November 6, 2018. Shortly thereafter, he withdrew his candidacy for Texas House Speaker, having unsuccessfully, along with several others, sought to succeed the retiring Joe Straus of San Antonio. Instead, Price endorsed Republican Dennis Bonnen of Angleton in Brazoria County, who emerged as the consensus choice for the speakership.

On July 19, 2023, Price announced his decision not to seek an eighth term in the Texas House of Representatives.

Texas House of Representatives
Preceded by David Swinford	Texas State Representative for District 87 (Carson, Moore, Sherman, and Potter counties); 2011–2025	Succeeded by Caroline Fairly
