= Dan Flynn (politician) =

American politician (1943–2022)

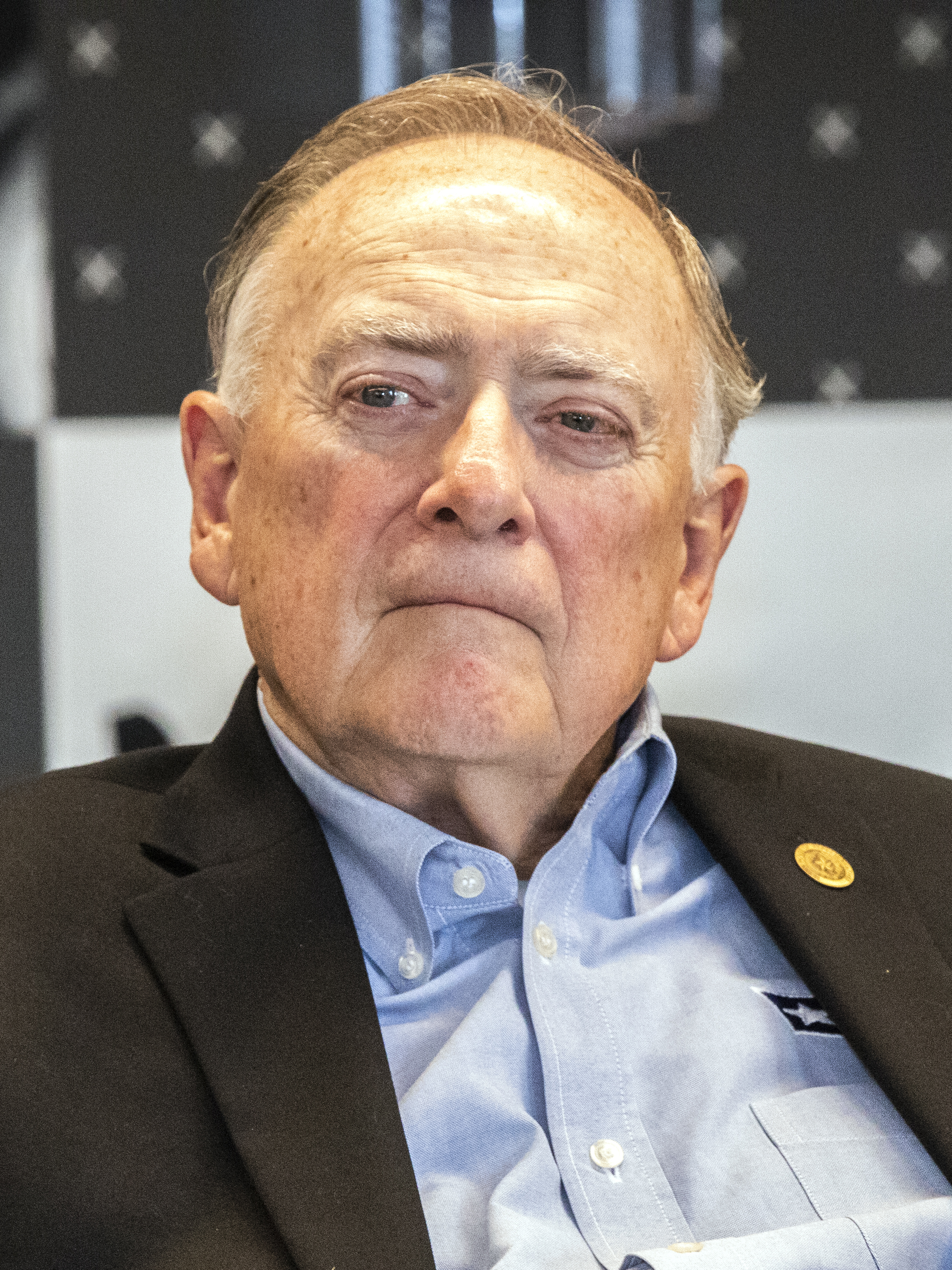

Member of the Texas House of Representatives from the 2nd district
- In office January 14, 2003 – January 12, 2021
- Preceded by: Thomas Donald Ramsay
- Succeeded by: Bryan Slaton

Personal details
- Born: February 21, 1943
- Died: October 28, 2022 (aged 79)
- Party: Republican
- Occupation: Businessman, rancher

Daniel Archie Flynn (February 21, 1943 – October 28, 2022) was an American businessman and rancher from Van, Texas, who was from 2003 to 2021 a Republican member of the Texas House of Representatives for District 2 (Hopkins, Hunt, and Van Zandt counties). On July 14, 2020, Flynn was defeated in his re-election attempt by Bryan Slaton by a 22-point margin in the Republican primary runoff.

== Life and career ==
Flynn was born on February 23, 1943. He was one of House Speaker Joe Straus's loyal supporters.

In December 2008, Flynn authored a bill requiring public documents to be in English only as a means of encouraging non-English speakers to learn English.

In his 2018 primary election, Flynn defeated Bryan Slaton, an intra-party rival from Hunt County, 11,803 (51.7 percent) to 11,013 (48.3 percent). After his reelection, Flynn called once again to permit public school teachers in the state the option of displaying the Ten Commandments in their classrooms. He has been unsuccessful in previous attempts to pass such legislation. Flynn said that he did not understand why his proposal is controversial — liberals viewed it as "unconstitutional" and certain to be challenged in federal court. Flynn said the proposal merely allowed teachers "to put something in their room that is about good values."

On July 14, 2020, Flynn was defeated in his re-election attempt by Bryan Slaton by a 22-point margin in the Republican primary runoff. Slaton ran to Flynn's right. He died on October 28, 2022, at the age of 79.

== Election results ==
=== 2002 ===
Republican primary results
Party	Candidate	Votes	%
Republican	Dan Flynn	3,046	56.5
Republican	Sue Ann Harting	1,900	35.2
Republican	Mickey Cooper	447	8.3
Total votes		5,393	100

General election results
Party	Candidate	Votes	%
Republican	Dan Flynn	18,872	58.5
Democratic	Danny Duncan	13,384	41.5
Total votes		32,256	100
Republican gain from Democratic			

=== 2004 ===
Republican primary results
Party	Candidate	Votes	%
Republican	Dan Flynn (incumbent)	4,040	100
Total votes		4,040	100

General election results
Party	Candidate	Votes	%
Republican	Dan Flynn (incumbent)	36,888	100
Total votes		36,888	100

=== 2006 ===
Republican primary results
Party	Candidate	Votes	%
Republican	Dan Flynn (incumbent)	5,221	73.3
Republican	Chuck Tull	1,899	26.7
Total votes		7,120	100

General election results
Party	Candidate	Votes	%
Republican	Dan Flynn (incumbent)	18,783	58.5
Democratic	Scott Cornuaud	11,926	37.1
Libertarian	Dawn M. Childs	1,404	4.4
Total votes		32,113	100

=== 2008 ===
Republican primary results
Party	Candidate	Votes	%
Republican	Dan Flynn (incumbent)	11,136	100
Total votes		11,136	100

General election results
Party	Candidate	Votes	%
Republican	Dan Flynn (incumbent)	39,258	85.0
Libertarian	Michael A. French	6,906	15.0
Total votes		46,164	100

=== 2010 ===
Republican primary results
Party	Candidate	Votes	%
Republican	Dan Flynn (incumbent)	10,841	65.3
Republican	Richard "Link" Linkenauger	5,754	34.7
Total votes		16,595	100

General election results
Party	Candidate	Votes	%
Republican	Dan Flynn (incumbent)	26,604	100
Total votes		26,604	100

=== 2012 ===
Republican primary results
Party	Candidate	Votes	%
Republican	Dan Flynn (incumbent)	11,070	59.5
Republican	George Alexander	7,532	40.5
Total votes		18,602	100

General election results
Party	Candidate	Votes	%
Republican	Dan Flynn (incumbent)	46,025	100
Total votes		46,025	100

=== 2014 ===
Republican primary results
Party	Candidate	Votes	%
Republican	Dan Flynn (incumbent)	13,903	100
Total votes		13,903	100

General election results
Party	Candidate	Votes	%
Republican	Dan Flynn (incumbent)	28,847	100
Total votes		28,847	100

=== 2016 ===
Republican primary results
Party	Candidate	Votes	%
Republican	Dan Flynn (incumbent)	14,918	51.0
Republican	Bryan Slaton	14,337	49.0
Total votes		29,255	100

General election results
Party	Candidate	Votes	%
Republican	Dan Flynn (incumbent)	54,605	100
Total votes		54,605	100

=== 2018 ===
Republican primary results
Party	Candidate	Votes	%
Republican	Dan Flynn (incumbent)	11,696	51.7
Republican	Bryan Slaton	10,921	48.3
Total votes		22,617	100

General election results
Party	Candidate	Votes	%
Republican	Dan Flynn (incumbent)	45,843	80.0
Democratic	Bill Brannon	11,432	20.0
Total votes		57,275	100

=== 2020 ===
Republican primary results
Party	Candidate	Votes	%
Republican	Dan Flynn (incumbent)	12,246	44.8
Republican	Bryan Slaton	9,889	36.1
Republican	Dwayne "Doc" Collins	5,223	19.1
Total votes		27,358	100

Republican primary runoff results
Party	Candidate	Votes	%
Republican	Bryan Slaton	9,757	61.07
Republican	Dan Flynn (incumbent)	6,221	38.93
Total votes		15,978	100

== Redistricting ==
Late in 2010, Representative Bryan Hughes of Mineola in Wood County, claimed that Larry Phillips, a lawmaker from Sherman, told Hughes that Dan Flynn and Erwin Cain, the newly elected conservative representative from Sulphur Springs, would be adversely redistricted for the 2012 elections because they had declined to commit to the second-term reelection of Speaker Joe Straus, a Moderate Republican from San Antonio. In a hearing before the House Ethics Committee, chaired by another East Texas representative, Chuck Hopson of Jacksonville, an ally of Speaker Straus, Phillips denied having made such a claim to Hughes. Neither Hughes nor Phillips taped the conversation. No judgment was made by the committee because of the lack of corroborating witnesses.

Flynn survived the redistricting. On March 1, 2016, Flynn narrowly won re-nomination in the Republican primary. He polled 14,917 votes (51 percent) to intraparty rival Bryan Slaton's 14,336 (49 percent).

== Legislative committees ==
During the 86th Texas Legislature, Flynn chaired the Defense and Veterans' Affairs Committee, and also served on the House Administration Committee and the Pensions, Investments and Financial Services Committee.

Texas House of Representatives
Preceded by Thomas Donald Ramsay	Texas State Representative for District 2 (Rains, Hunt, and Van Zandt counties); 2003–2021	Succeeded by Bryan Slaton
