= William F. Evans =

American politician

Member of the Texas House of Representatives from the 3rd district
- In office November 3, 1851 – November 7, 1853
- Preceded by: James Shackelford Gillett
- Succeeded by: John H. Fowler

Personal details
- Born: April 15, 1799 Davidson County, Tennessee, United States of America
- Died: November 7, 1865 (aged 66) Texas, United States of America
- Spouse: Nancy W. Davidson (m. 1822)
- Children: 14
- Parent(s): Joseph Evans; Margaret Evans

William F. Evans (April 15, 1799 - November 7, 1865) was a Texan politician who served in the Texas House of Representatives from 1851 to 1853.

== Biography ==
Evans was born on April 15, 1799, to Joseph and Margaret Evans in Davidson County, Tennessee. in September 1814, he enlisted in a brigade of the Tennessee Volunteer Mounted Gunmen in Fayetteville, he served for five months as a private in the War of 1812 and was discharged in 1822.

He married Nancy W. Davidson on October 8, 1822. Evans and Davidson had 14 children together, one of whom was Martha Melissa Evans, who later married Edward Clark, who became governor of Texas in 1861.

Evans moved with his family to Marshall in 1842, with Evans becoming the first medical doctor to settle there. He opened a drugstore and grocery business with Edward B. Griggs and Hobart Key, and owned twenty-six slaves by 1850. he was elected to the Texas House of Representatives for the 3rd district in 1850, and served for a single term until 1863. Evans died suddenly in his home on November 7, 1863, shortly after his appointment by Andrew Johnson to serve as the Texas tax commissioner, which was scheduled to begin on November 30.
