= Ed Thompson (Texas politician) =

Texas legislator

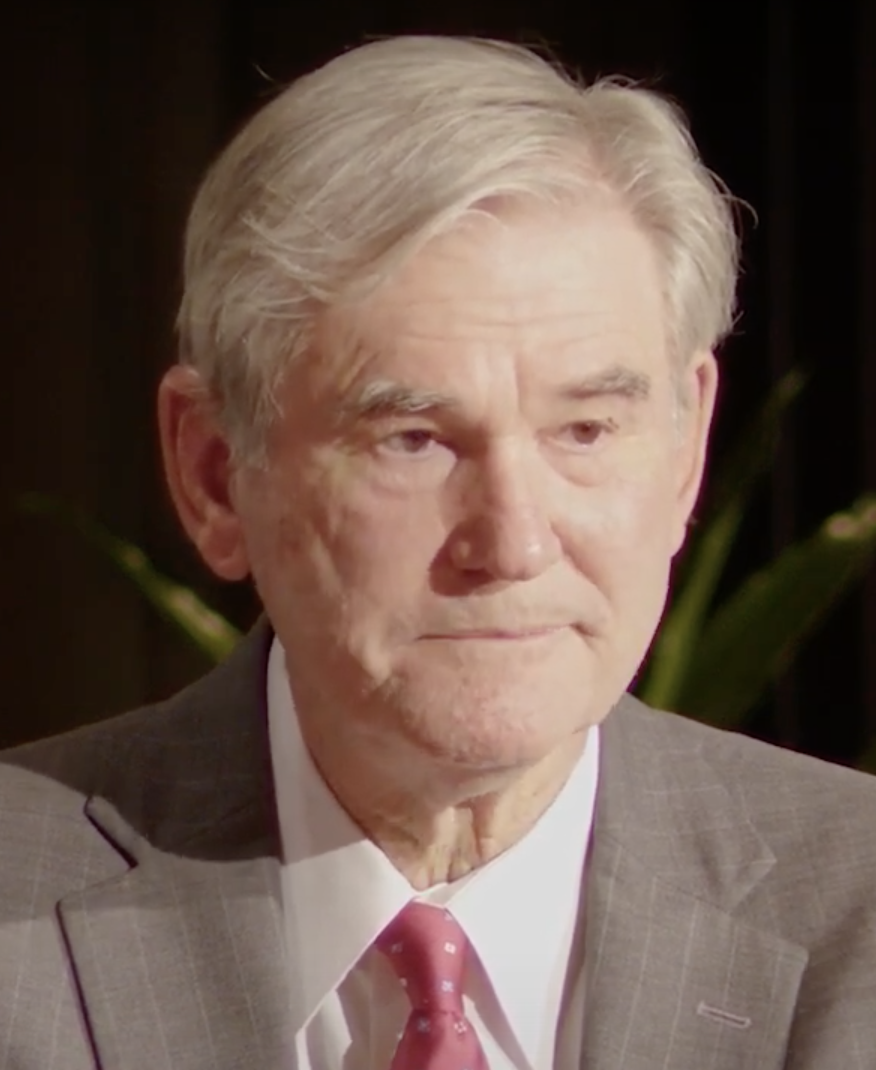

Member of the Texas House of Representatives from the 29th district
- In office January 8, 2013 – January 14, 2025
- Preceded by: Randy Weber
- Succeeded by: Jeffrey Barry

Personal details
- Born: Edward Lynn Thompson; November 24, 1950 (age 75)
- Party: Republican
- Spouse: Freddie
- Children: 2
- Education: University of Houston (BBA)
- Occupation: Insurance agent
- Website: edthompson29.com

Edward Lynn Thompson (born November 24, 1950) is an American insurance agent and politician. He represented the 29th District in the Texas House of Representatives from 2013 to 2025. A member of the Republican Party, Thompson has also served as an insurance agent with State Farm since 1982.

== Education and career ==
Thompson earned a Bachelor of Business Administration in Finance at the University of Houston, before moving to Pearland, Texas. Since then and before becoming a state legislature, he served on the Pearland City Council, the Pearland Economic Development Corporation, the Chairman of the Pearland Chamber, and Trustee of the Pearland Independent School District.

On May 27, 2023, Thompson voted no to impeach Ken Paxton. In the 2024 election, he was succeeded by Jeffrey Barry.

Texas House of Representatives
Preceded by Randy Weber	Member of the Texas House of Representatives from the 29th district 2013–present	Incumbent
