= Frederick Forney Foscue =

American politician

Member of the Texas House of Representatives from the 21st district
- In office November 7, 1859 – November 4, 1861
- Preceded by: Thomas Jefferson Johnson; James C. Francis
- Succeeded by: Alexander H. Abney; William P. Beall

Member of the Texas House of Representatives from the 1st district
- In office November 2, 1863 – August 6, 1866
- Preceded by: Isaiah Junker
- Succeeded by: Ambrose Kent

Member of the Texas Senate from the 1st district
- In office August 6, 1866 – February 7, 1870
- Preceded by: Rufus K. Hartley
- Succeeded by: Edward Bradford Pickett

Personal details
- Born: September 11, 1819
- Died: March 3, 1906 (aged 86)
- Spouse: Mary J. Foscue
- Children: 2
- Parent: Benjamin Foscue

Frederick Forney Foscue (September 11, 1819 – March 3, 1906) was an American politician who served in the Texas House of Representatives from 1859 to 1866 and the Texas Senate from 1866 to 1870.

== Life ==
Foscue was born on September 11, 1819, to Benjamin Foscue and an unknown mother. He was one of 9 children. Later, he married Mary J. Foscue and had 2 children. He died on March 3, 1906.

== Politics ==
Foscue was first elected as the representative of the 21st district of the Texas House of Representatives from November 1859 to November 1861. There was more than one representative during the legislature before and after Foscue's term. Foscue was then elected as the representative of the Texas House of Representatives for District 1 from November 1863 to August 1866. His final term was for the 1st district of the Texas Senate from August 1866 to February 1870.
