= Mark Stiles =

American politician

Member of the Texas House of Representatives from the 21st district
- In office January 11, 1983 – January 12, 1999
- Preceded by: Tom DeLay
- Succeeded by: Allan Ritter

Personal details
- Born: November 3, 1948 (age 77) Houston, Texas, U.S.
- Party: Democratic
- Education: Lamar University
- Profession: cattle rancher

Mark W. Stiles (born November 3, 1948) is an American politician. He served as a Democratic member for the 21st district in the Texas House of Representatives from 1983 to 1999. The Mark Stiles Unit is named after him.
