= Allan Ritter =

American politician

Member of the Texas House of Representatives from the 21st district
- In office January 12, 1999 – January 13, 2015
- Preceded by: Mark Stiles
- Succeeded by: Dade Phelan

Personal details
- Party: Republican (2010 - present)
- Other political affiliations: Democratic (before 2010)

Allan B. Ritter is an American politician and a former member of the Texas House of Representatives. He was first elected to the Texas House of Representatives in 1998 as a Democrat representing District 21. He switched political parties and became a Republican in 2010.

In October 2013, Ritter stated that he would retire from the state legislature at the conclusion of his eighth term. Ritter was credited with the proposal and subsequent passage of House Bill 4 in 2014, regarding the water supply in Texas, an issue first considered by the state legislature in 1999.
