= Texas's 30th House of Representatives district =

American legislative district

Texas's 30th State House of Representatives district
Representative
AJ Louderback; R–Victoria
since January 14, 2025

District 30 is a district in the Texas House of Representatives. It was created in the 3rd Legislature (1849–1851).

The district encompasses DeWitt, Goliad, Jackson, Lavaca, Matagorda, and Victoria Counties. It includes the cities of Victoria, Cuero, Edna, and Bay City. It has been represented by AJ Louderback since 2025.

== Members ==
- Steve Holzheauser
- Geanie Morrison
- AJ Louderback
