= Steve Holzheauser =

American politician

Member of the Texas House of Representatives from the 30th district
- In office January 12, 1993 – January 12, 1999
- Preceded by: Robert Saunders
- Succeeded by: Geanie Morrison

Member of the Texas House of Representatives from the 32nd district
- In office January 13, 1987 – January 12, 1993
- Preceded by: Ken Armbrister
- Succeeded by: Todd Ames Hunter

Personal details
- Party: Republican

Steve Holzheauser is an American politician who served in the Texas House of Representatives from 1987 to 1999.
