= Texas's 87th House of Representatives district =

Electoral district of Texas

Texas's 87th State House of Representatives district
Representative
Caroline Fairly; R–Amarillo

District 87 is a district in the Texas House of Representatives. It has been represented by Republican Caroline Fairly since 2025.

== Geography ==
The district contains the counties of Carson, Hansford, Hutchinson, Lipscomb, Moore, Ochilitree, Potter and Sherman.

== Members ==
- William Bierschwale (until 1918)
- Samuel Ealy Johnson Jr. (February 6, 1918 – January 9, 1923)
- Ben F. Foster (after 1923)
- David Swinford (1990 to 2011)
- Four Price (2011 to 2024)
- Caroline Fairly (since 2025)
