= Texas's 81st House of Representatives district =

American legislative district

Texas's 81st State House of Representatives district
Representative
Brooks Landgraf; R–Odessa

District 81 is a district in the Texas House of Representatives. It has been represented by Republican Brooks Landgraf since 2015.

== Geography ==
The district covers the West Texas counties of Ector, Loving, Ward, Winkler.

== Members ==
- Tryon Lewis (until 2015)
- Brooks Landgraf (since 2015)
