= Brent Money =

American politician (born 1978)

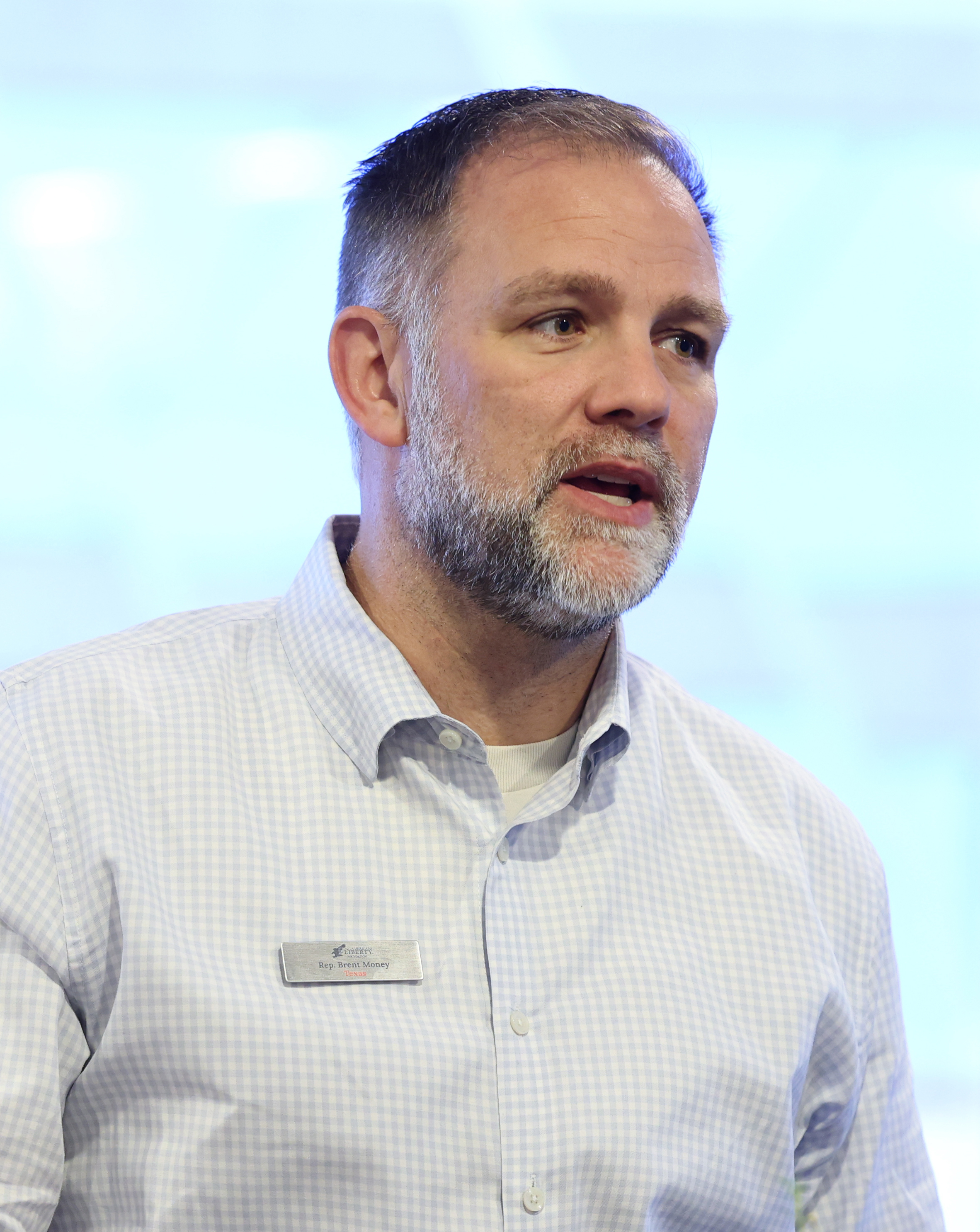
- Money at the 2024 Hazlitt Summit hosted by Young Americans for Liberty Foundation

Member of the Texas House of Representatives from the 2nd district
- Incumbent
- Assumed office January 14, 2025
- Preceded by: Jill Dutton

Personal details
- Born: August 23, 1978 (age 48) Greenville, Texas, U.S.
- Party: Republican
- Spouse: Heidi
- Education: Texas A&M University–Commerce (BS); Southern Methodist University (JD)
- Website: Campaign website

Brent Andrew Money (born August 23, 1978) is an American politician. He serves as a Republican member of the 2nd district of the Texas House of Representatives.

== Early life and education ==
Money was born in Greenville, Texas. He attended Texas A&M University–Commerce, earning his bachelor's degree in 2001. He also attended Southern Methodist University, earning his Juris Doctor degree in 2006.

== Texas House of Representatives ==
Following the expulsion of Republican Bryan Slaton on May 9, 2023, Money ran in the special election to finish out the remainder of the term for the 2nd district of the Texas House of Representatives. On November 7, 2023, Money finished first place with 32% of the vote, but no candidate received a majority so Money advanced to the runoff election along with candidate Jill Dutton. Both candidates in the runoff were backed by opposing factions of the Texas Republican Party and the election was closely watched. On January 30, 2024, Dutton won the runoff by a margin of 110 votes and she was sworn into office.

In March 2024, Dutton and Money faced each other yet again during the regularly scheduled Republican primary election. In this race Money defeated Dutton, winning 56.9% of the vote. In November 2024, he defeated Democrat Kristen Washington in the general election, winning 80.6% percent of the vote. Money assumed office on January 14, 2025.

In 2025, Money introduced a bill in the Texas House of Representatives that would extend the legal consequences for abortion to women who terminate their own pregnancies, such as by using medication. He also sponsored and wrote a bill to ban gender affirming care for transgender individuals of all ages.

Money founded the Sharia-Free Texas Caucus in the Texas Legislature. He has said that the United States should be governed by Christians and that there should be religious tests for political office. Money said in 2026, "We’ve proven over 250 years that we’re best ruled when we’re ruled by Christian men."

Texas House of Representatives
Preceded by Jill Dutton	Member of the Texas House of Representatives from the 2nd district 2025–present	Incumbent
