= Caroline Fairly =

American politician

Member of the Texas House of Representatives from the 87th district
- Incumbent
- Assumed office January 14, 2025
- Preceded by: Four Price

Personal details
- Born: January 10, 1999 (age 27) Amarillo, Texas, U.S.
- Party: Republican
- Education: Abilene Christian University (BA)
- Occupation: Medical negotiator
- Website: Campaign website

Caroline Fairly is an American politician who serves as a member of the Texas House of Representatives for the 87th district.

== Background and election ==
A member of the Republican Party, Fairly worked for U.S. representative Ronny Jackson before running for office.

Fairly's father Alex is a prominent businessman from the district that she represents, and is involved in local and state Republican politics. He donated $525,600 to her campaign, which accounted for 43% of her total fundraising.

Born in 1999, Fairly is the youngest female Republican member elected to the Texas House.

== Texas House of Representatives ==
On the first day of the 89th session of the Texas Legislature, Fairly announced she would support Dustin Burrows for Texas Speaker of the House.
