= Texas's 29th House of Representatives district =

American legislative district

Texas's 29th State House of Representatives district
Representative
Jeffrey Barry; R–Pearland
since January 10, 2013
- Demographics: 44% White; 13.7% Black; 32.1% Hispanic; 9% Asian
- Population (2020): 185,176

District 29 is a district in the Texas House of Representatives. It was created in the 3rd Legislature (1849–1851).

The district is fully within Brazoria County, including its northern and eastern portions. It accounts for half of the county's representation in the chamber. It includes Alvin, nearly 70% of Pearland, and just over half of Manvel.

== Members ==
- Glenda Dawson
- Ed Thompson
- Jeffrey Barry
