= Lyndon Pete Patterson =

American politician

Pete Patterson

Member of the Texas House of Representatives
- In office January 11, 1977 – January 12, 1999
- Preceded by: George L. Preston
- Succeeded by: Mark S. Homer
- Constituency: 9th district (1977–1983); 2nd district (1983–1995); 3rd district (1995–1999)

Personal details
- Born: December 20, 1934 Brookston, Texas, U.S.
- Died: December 9, 2017 (aged 82) Honey Grove, Texas, U.S.
- Spouse: Doris Adlene Bell
- Children: 4

Lyndon Pete Patterson (December 20, 1934 – December 9, 2017) was an American politician, rancher, and realtor who served in the Texas House of Representatives from 1977 to 1999.

== Life ==
Patterson was born on December 20, 1934, at Brookston, Lamar, Texas, US, to Opal Oakleaf Patterson and Sherman Alva. His father died in 1945. He married Doris Adlene Bell on November 16, 1952. They later had 4 children. His mother died in 1981. He died on December 9, 2017, at the age of 82 in a nursing center in Honey Grove, Fannin County, Texas, US.

== Politics ==
Patterson served in the Texas House of Representatives from 1977 to 1999 under 3 districts; District 9 from 1977 to 1983, District 2 from 1983 to 1995, and District 3 from 1995 to 1999.
