= Cecil Bell Jr. =

American politician

Cecil Ivan Bell Jr.
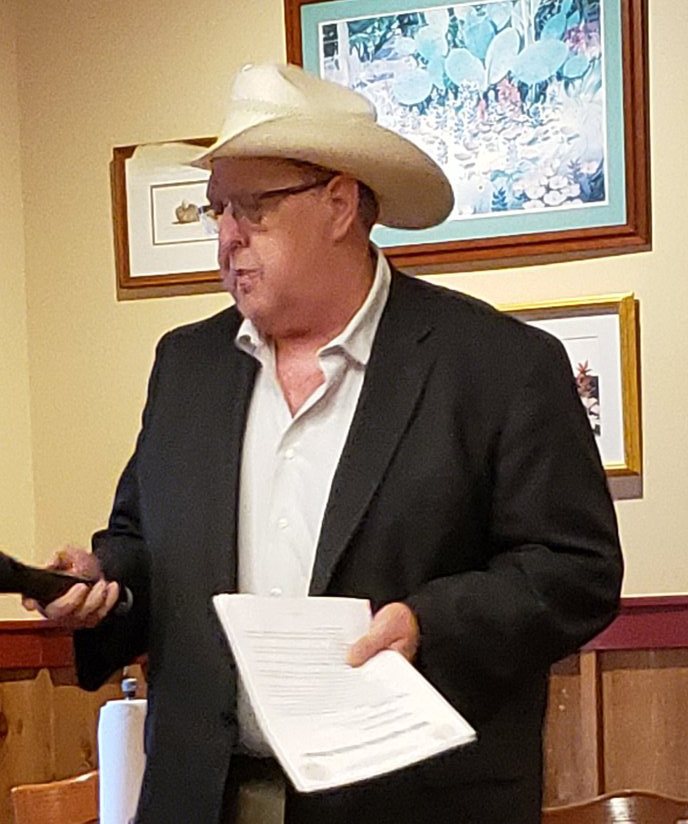

Member of the Texas House of Representatives from the 3rd district
- Incumbent
- Assumed office January 8, 2013
- Preceded by: Erwin Cain (redistricted)

Personal details
- Born: May 17, 1962 (age 64) Rosenberg, Texas, U.S.
- Party: Republican
- Spouse: Jo Ann Bell
- Occupation: General contractor

Military service
- Allegiance: Texas
- Branch/service: Texas Military Department
- Rank: Colonel (TX)
- Unit: Texas State Guard

Cecil Ivan Bell Jr. (born May 17, 1962) is a Republican member of the Texas House of Representatives for District 3, which initially encompassed Waller County and is now entirely a portion of populous Montgomery County in Southeast Texas. Bell was defeated in the March 3, 2026, Republican primary election by Kristen Plaisance by a 55.1% to 44.9% margin.

== Politics ==
Bell serves on the Appropriations and Land & Resource Management committees and the Appropriations subcommittee on Articles VI, VII & VIII.

In January 2015, Bell introduced legislation, HB 623, that prevents salary, pension, and other benefits from being paid to any Texas state employee who issues a same-sex marriage license. The bill included a provision to forestall legal action challenging the proposed law by mandating that state courts dismiss any such challenges and award court costs and attorney fees to the state. The bill died in committee.

Bell supports expanding career and technology training at public high schools so that students can enter the job market with a career certification but without following the college or university route.

In 2015, Bell sought unsuccessfully to prohibit the State of Texas from complying with Obergefell v. Hodges, the United States Supreme Court legal opinion sanctioning same-sex marriage. In 2017, Bell introduced a more comprehensive bill to allow his state to declare federal laws and court decisions unconstitutional and therefore unenforceable within the boundaries of Texas. Bell has proposed that federal treaties and presidential executive orders be subject to state scrutiny to block actions which the state considers unconstitutional. The legislation would establish a 12-member Joint Legislative Committee on Constitutional Enforcement, with six members each from the House and the Texas State Senate, to consider federal actions in light of constitutional interpretation in 1787. "I think it is important for patriotic Americans to recognize the strength and necessity of our Constitution. It is also important that we defend that Constitution,” Bell told the Texas House Select Committee on State and Federal Power and Responsibility.

Bell is a member of the Texas State Guard.

Bell won his fourth legislative term in the general election held on November 6, 2018. With 48,562 votes (76 percent), he handily defeated Democrat Lisa Seger, who polled 15,314 (24 percent).

On January 25, 2019, Bell, along with Steve Toth and Will Metcalf, filed House Bill 1042, which would require Texas schools and law enforcement agencies to establish active shooter response plans and law enforcement agencies to conduct annual drills while also requiring law enforcement to contain or eliminate a threat immediately.

== Annexation bill ==
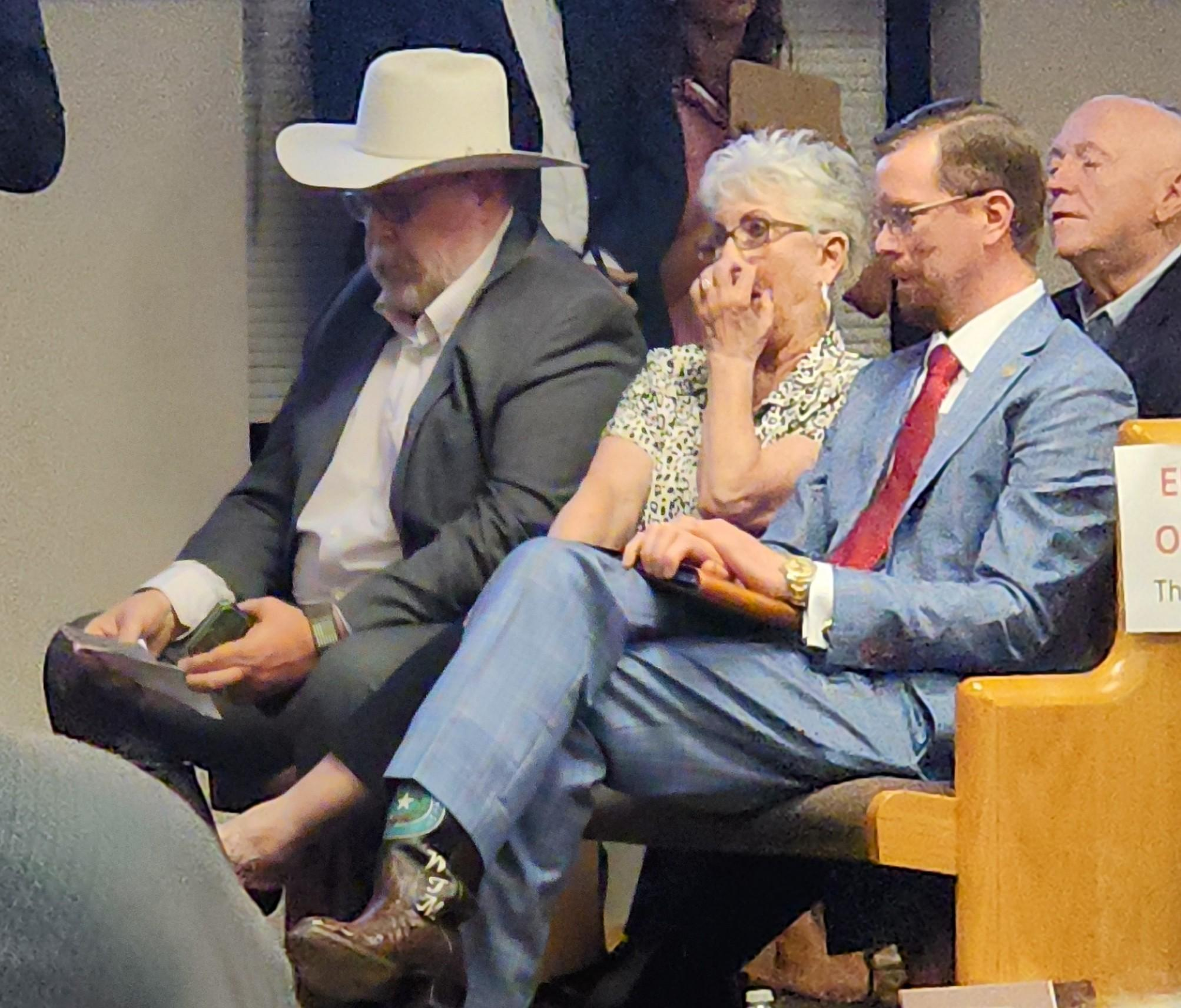
Cecil Bell and Will Metcalf being censured by the Montgomery County Republican Party in Conroe, Texas on March 4, 2025.

Bell authored a bill in the Texas House, HB 347 of the 86th Session, to ban the process of forced annexation by cities over suburban and rural areas. The bill will require a Texas city to get the approval of the people and businesses affected by the annexation. It passed both chambers of the Texas legislature and was signed by Governor Greg Abbott on May 24, 2019.

On May 27, 2023, Bell voted no to impeach Ken Paxton.

As of January 15, 2025, Bell's campaign had $78,199.98 cash on hand.

On March 4, 2025, the Montgomery County Republican Party censured Bell for supporting Dustin Burrows as Speaker of the Texas House of Representatives and voting for HR4, breaching the Texas GOP’s “No Democrat Chairs” priority.

=== 2026 Texas House campaign ===
Bell faced Kristen Plaisance in the March 2026 Republican primary. Plaisance defeated Bell 55.1% to 44.9% on March 4, 2026, with a lead so large that no runoff is necessary. One of the issues during the campaign, raised by Plaisance, was Bell's decision to vote with Democrats for House Speaker.

== Electoral history ==
2012

2012 Texas House of Representatives, District 3 Republican Primary
Party	Candidate	Votes	%
Republican	Cecil Bell Jr.	7,249	56.90
Republican	Bob Bagley	3,359	26.36
Republican	Troy Bonin	2,133	16.74

2014

2014 Texas House of Representatives, District 3 General Election
Party	Candidate	Votes	%
Republican	Cecil Bell Jr.	28,760	91.08
Libertarian	Larry Parr	2,818	8.92

2018

2018 Texas House of Representatives, District 3 General Election
Party	Candidate	Votes	%
Republican	Cecil Bell Jr.	48,619	76.00
Democratic	Lisa Seger	15,352	24.00

2022

2022 Texas House of Representatives, District 3 Republican Primary
Party	Candidate	Votes	%
Republican	Cecil Bell Jr.	14,080	67.19
Republican	Kelly McDonald	6,877	32.81

2026

2026 Texas House of Representatives, District 3 Republican Primary
Party	Candidate	Votes	%
Republican	Kristen Plaisance	13,976	55.10
Republican	Cecil Bell, Jr.	11,405	44.90

Texas House of Representatives
Preceded by Erwin Cain	Member of the Texas House of Representatives from the 3rd district 2013–present	Incumbent
