= Brooks Landgraf =

American attorney and politician

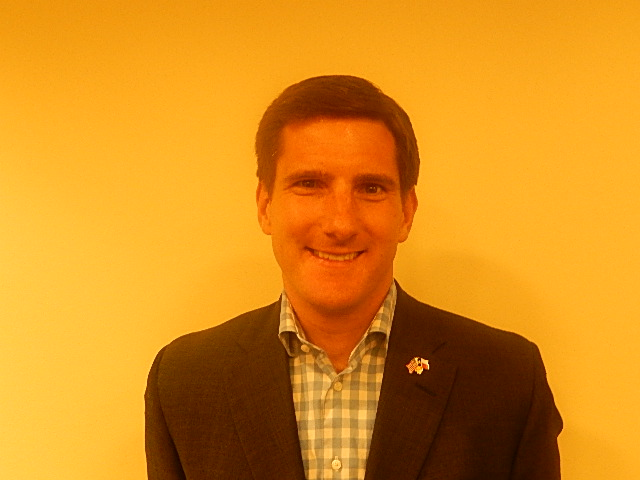
- Brooks Landgraf in 2014

Member of the Texas House of Representatives from the 81st district
- Incumbent
- Assumed office January 13, 2015
- Preceded by: Tryon Lewis

Personal details
- Born: Brooks Frederick Landgraf; March 5, 1981 (age 45) Odessa, Texas, U.S.
- Party: Republican
- Spouse: Shelby Levins (m. 2013)
- Children: 1
- Education: Texas A&M University (BS); St. Mary's University (JD)

Brooks Frederick Landgraf (born March 15, 1981) is an American attorney and politician serving as a member of the Texas House of Representatives from the 81st district. Elected in November 2014, he assumed office in 2015.

== Early life and education ==
Landgraf is a native of Odessa, Texas and graduated from Permian High School. He earned a Bachelor of Science degree from Texas A&M University and a Juris Doctor from the St. Mary's University School of Law. As an undergraduate, Landgraf was a member of the Texas A&M University Corps of Cadets.

== Career ==
After graduating from law school, Landgraf returned to Odessa and began working as an attorney. Landgraf was elected to the Texas House of Representatives in November 2014 and assumed office in 2015.

== Personal life ==
Landgraf married Shelby Levins in 2013. They have one daughter.

Texas House of Representatives
Preceded by Tryon Lewis	Member of the Texas House of Representatives from the 81st district 2015–present	Incumbent
