= Jeffrey Barry (politician) =

American politician

Member of the Texas House of Representatives from the 29th district
- Incumbent
- Assumed office January 14, 2025
- Succeeded by: Ed Thompson

Personal details
- Party: Republican
- Website: https://www.votejeffbarry.com/

Jeffrey Barry is an American politician who was elected member of the Texas House of Representatives for the 29th district in 2024. A member of the Republican Party, he succeeded Ed Thompson. Barry was a member of Pearland City Council.
