= Harbin Hansbrow Moore =

American politician (1869–1955)

Member of the Texas House of Representatives from the 126th district
- In office January 13, 1925 – February 8, 1927
- Preceded by: John McCullough Melson
- Succeeded by: Alexander Brice

Personal details
- Born: November 27, 1869 Dallas County, Texas, U.S.
- Died: October 17, 1955 (aged 85) Terrell, Texas, U.S.
- Party: Democratic

Harbin Hansbrow Moore (November 27, 1869 – October 17, 1955), also known as H. H. Moore, was an American politician. A member of the Democratic Party, he served in the Texas House of Representatives from 1925 to 1927.

== Life and career ==
Moore was born in Dallas County, Texas, the son of Harbin Sr. and Mary Moore. He was a businessman and a farmer.

Moore served in the Texas House of Representatives from January 13, 1925, until his expulsion on February 8, 1927, which he was expelled by a vote of 119–14, after a report found that Moore and Francis Aaron Dale accepted a $1000 bribe from optometrist W. W. Chamberlain to "influence pending legislation and declare their seats vacant".

== Death ==
Moore died on October 17, 1955, in Terrell, Texas, at the age of 85.
