= Pat Curry =

American politician

Member of the Texas House of Representatives from the 56th district
- Incumbent
- Assumed office November 18, 2024
- Preceded by: Charles Anderson

Personal details
- Party: Republican

Pat Curry is an American politician. He serves as a Republican member for the 56th district of the Texas House of Representatives.
