= Jill Dutton =

American politician

Member of the Texas House of Representatives from the 2nd district
- In office February 14, 2024 – January 14, 2025
- Preceded by: Bryan Slaton
- Succeeded by: Brent Money

Personal details
- Party: Republican

Jill Dutton is an American politician who was the representative for the 2nd district in the Texas House of Representatives. She is a member of the Republican Party.

== Political career ==
Dutton previously served as the president of the Republican Women of Van Zandt and as a trustee of the Van Independent School District.

Following the expulsion of Republican Bryan Slaton on May 9, 2023, (Note: Slaton had previously resigned his seat, but the Texas House of Representatives continued with the expulsion effort in order to prevent him from continuing to receive the benefits of his office until a successor was elected.) Dutton ran in the November 7, 2023, special election held to succeed him. No candidate received a majority of votes, with Dutton advancing to a runoff against fellow Republican Brent Money.

Dutton was supported by Congressman Lance Gooden, former Governor Rick Perry, local elected officials and grassroots supporters in her campaign, while Money received support from governor Greg Abbott, and attorney general Ken Paxton. Dutton narrowly defeated Money in the runoff, held on January 30, 2024. She was sworn into office on February 14, 2024.

Dutton ran for re-election but was defeated by Brent Money in the Republican primary on March 5, 2024.

== Notes ==
Texas House of Representatives
Preceded by Bryan Slaton	Member of the Texas House of Representatives from the 2nd district 2024–2025	Succeeded by Brent Money
