= AJ Louderback =

American politician

Member of the Texas House of Representatives from the 30th district
- Incumbent
- Assumed office January 14, 2025
- Preceded by: Geanie Morrison

Personal details
- Born: Andrew John Louderback; December 27, 1956 (age 69) Matagorda County, Texas
- Party: Republican
- Spouse: Marci Renee Grantland (m. 2022)
- Education: Pikes Peak Community College
- Website: Campaign website

Military service
- Branch/service: United States Air Force

Andrew John "AJ" Louderback (born December 27, 1956) is an American politician serving as a member of the Texas House of Representatives from the 30th district since 2025. A member of the Republican Party, he was elected in 2024 and succeeded Geanie Morrison.

== Background ==
Louderback was born and raised in Matagorda County, Texas, and graduated from Palacios High School. He attended Pikes Peak Community College. He married Marci Renee Grantland in June 2022. Louderback is a United States Air Force veteran and served as sheriff of Jackson County for five terms.

== Texas House of Representatives ==
In 2024, Louderback defeated Victoria mayor Jeff Bauknight in the Republican primary runoff election. Bauknight had been endorsed by Morrison and governor Greg Abbott, while Louderback had been endorsed by attorney general Ken Paxton and lieutenant governor Dan Patrick.

== Electoral history ==
=== 2024 ===
District 30 Republican primary
Party	Candidate	Votes	%
Republican	Jeff Bauknight	11,384	42.07%
Republican	AJ Louderback	10,946	40.45%
Republican	Vanessa Hicks-Callaway	2,733	10.10%
Republican	Bret Baldwin	1,998	7.38%
Total votes		27,061	100.00%

District 30 Republican primary runoff
Party	Candidate	Votes	%
Republican	AJ Louderback	9,105	55.04%
Republican	Jeff Bauknight	7,437	44.96%
Total votes		16,542	100.00%

District 30 general election
Party	Candidate	Votes	%
Republican	AJ Louderback	57,180	76.96%
Democratic	Stephanie Bassham	17,120	23.04%
Total votes		74,300	100%
Republican hold			
