= Nelson Cowles =

American politician (1930–2021)

Member of the Texas House of Representatives
- In office January 10, 1961 – January 10, 1967

Personal details
- Born: December 9, 1930 Hallsville, Texas, U.S.
- Died: August 30, 2021 (aged 90) Hallsville, Texas, U.S.
- Party: Democratic

Lonnie Nelson Cowles (December 9, 1930 – August 30, 2021) was an American politician. He served as a Democratic member in the Texas House of Representatives from 1961 to 1967.
