= David S. Louderback =

American politician

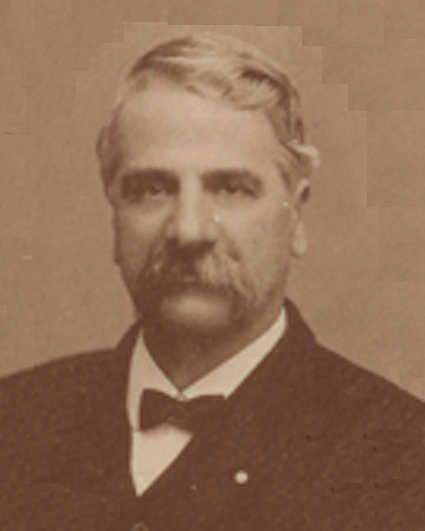

Member of the Virginia House of Delegates for Page and Rappahannock
- In office January 10, 1906 – January 12, 1910
- Preceded by: J. Hunton Wood
- Succeeded by: W. J. Browning

Personal details
- Born: David Solon Louderback; October 23, 1851
- Died: December 27, 1911 (aged 60)
- Party: Democratic
- Spouse: Mary Elizabeth Drummond

David Solon Louderback (October 23, 1851 – December 27, 1911) was an American politician who served in the Virginia House of Delegates.
