= Texas's 21st House of Representatives district =

American legislative district

Texas's 21st State House of Representatives district
Representative
Dade Phelan; R–Beaumont

District 21 is a district in the Texas House of Representatives. It has been represented by Republican Dade Phelan since 2015.

== Geography ==
The district covers the counties of Jasper, Jefferson, and Orange in East Texas.

== Members ==
- Thomas Jefferson Johnson (until 1859)
- James C. Francis (until 1859)
- Frederick Forney Foscue (November 7, 1859 – November 4, 1861)
- Alexander H. Abney (after 1861)
- William P. Beall (after 1861)
- Joe A. Hubenak (until 1979)
- Tom DeLay (1979–1983)
- Mark Stiles (1983–1999)
- Allan Ritter (1999–2015)
- Dade Phelan (since 2015)
