= Texas's 56th House of Representatives district =

American legislative district

Texas's 56th State House of Representatives district
Representative
Pat Curry; R–Waco
- Demographics: 59.7% White; 12.0% Black; 23.8% Hispanic; 2.9% Asian
- Population (2020) • Voting age: 199,548; 159,656

The 56th district of the Texas House of Representatives contains the western portion of McLennan County, and a portion of Waco. The current representative is Pat Curry, who was first elected in 2024.
