= Texas's 2nd House of Representatives district =

American legislative district

Texas's 2nd State House of Representatives district
Representative
Brent Money; R–Greenville
- Demographics: 71.1% White; 7.3% Black; 16.9% Hispanic; 1.2% Asian; 3.5% Other
- Population (2020) • Voting age: 196,284; 149,984

District 2 is a house in the Texas House of Representatives. It was created in the 3rd legislature (1849–1851).

As a result of redistricting after the 2020 United States census, beginning with the 2022 elections the district encompasses all of Hopkins, Hunt, and Van Zandt Counties. Major cities in the district include Canton, Commerce, Greenville, and Sulphur Springs. The district also contains Texas A&M University–Commerce and parts of Lake Tawakoni and Cooper State Park.

== 2023 expulsion and vacancy ==
The district was represented by Bryan Slaton from January 14, 2021, upon his initial election to the Texas House, until he resigned on May 8, 2023, after facing potential expulsion by the House for "an inappropriate relationship with an intern". Notwithstanding his resignation, Slaton was subsequently and unanimously expelled by the House on the following day, May 9, 2023. The incumbent of this district is Republican Brent Money.

=== 2023 special election ===
Governor Greg Abbott announced a special election to fill the remainder of Slaton's unexpired term would take place on November 7, 2023. (A special election to fill the vacancy of a state legislator is a direct election with no primary, per Texas Election Code, Title 12 Sec. 203.002.)

By the deadline on September 6, 2023, six candidates had filed for a place on the ballot to fill the vacant seat for House District 2. Five candidates filed as Republicans (Jill Dutton, Heath Hyde, Brent Money, Doug Roszhart, and Krista Schild); Kristen Washington filed as a Democrat.

The special election took place on the same November ballot as the 2023 constitutional amendment propositions. No candidate received more than 50% of the vote, and the top two vote-getters (Dutton with 25.26% of the vote, and Money with 31.75% of the vote) will proceed to a run-off election on January 30, 2024.

== List of representatives ==
(Source:)

Leg.	Representative	Party	Term start	Term end	Counties they represented
3rd	Hardin R. Runnels	Unknown	November 5, 1849	November 21, 1850	Bowie, Red River
4th	William Fields	Unknown	November 3, 1851	November 7, 1853	Liberty, Polk
5th	James W. Sims	Unknown	November 7, 1853	November 5, 1855	Red River
6th	Joseph J. Dickson	Unknown	November 17, 1855	November 2, 1857	Red River
7th	Joseph H. Burks, Sr.	Unknown	November 7, 1857	February 14, 1859	Red River
7th	Vacant	N/A	February 14, 1859	November 7, 1859	Red River
8th	Benjamin H. Epperson	Unknown	November 7, 1859	November 4, 1861	Red River
9th	Demetrius Willis	Unknown	November 4, 1861	November 2, 1863	Liberty, Polk
10th	Edwin B. Adams	Unknown	November 2, 1863	August 6, 1866	Liberty, Polk
11th	A. B. Trowell	Unknown	August 6, 1866	February 7, 1870	Liberty, Polk
12th	James A. Abney	Unknown	February 10, 1870	August 15, 1870	Angelina, Nacogdoches, Sabine, San Augustine, Shelby, Trinity
12th	Sterling L. Smith	Democratic	February 9, 1870	February 23, 1870	Angelina, Nacogdoches, Sabine, San Augustine, Shelby, Trinity
12th	Edward L. Robb	Democratic	February 9, 1870	January 14, 1873	Angelina, Nacogdoches, Sabine, San Augustine, Shelby, Trinity
12th	William H. Bonner	Republican	May 2, 1870	January 14, 1873	Angelina, Nacogdoches, Sabine, San Augustine, Shelby, Trinity
12th	John Polley	Democratic	October 31, 1871	January 14, 1873	Angelina, Nacogdoches, Sabine, San Augustine, Shelby, Trinity
13th	Samuel B. Bewley	Democratic	January 14, 1873	January 13, 1874	Angelina, Nacogdoches, Sabine, San Augustine, Shelby, Trinity
13th	Sam T. Robb	Democratic	January 14, 1873	January 13, 1874	Angelina, Nacogdoches, Sabine, San Augustine, Shelby, Trinity
13th	Daniel M. Short	Democratic	January 14, 1873	January 13, 1874	Angelina, Nacogdoches, Sabine, San Augustine, Shelby, Trinity
14th	Benjamin B. Anderson	Democratic	January 14, 1874	April 18, 1876	Nacogdoches, Panola, Sabine, San Augustine, Shelby
14th	William M. Gellatly	Democratic	January 13, 1874	April 18, 1876	Nacogdoches, Panola, Sabine, San Augustine, Shelby
14th	Franklin L. Johnston	Democratic	January 13, 1874	April 18, 1876	Nacogdoches, Panola, Sabine, San Augustine, Shelby
14th	Joseph V. Massy	Democratic	January 13, 1874	April 18, 1876	Nacogdoches, Panola, Sabine, San Augustine, Shelby
15th	John C. McKinnon	Democratic	April 18, 1876	January 14, 1879	Polk, San Jacinto, Tyler
16th	William T. Hill	Democratic	January 14, 1879	January 11, 1881	Polk, San Jacinto, Tyler
17th	James E. Hill	Democratic	January 11, 1881	January 9, 1883	Polk, San Jacinto, Tyler
18th	James E. Hill	Democratic	January 9, 1883	January 13, 1885	Polk, San Jacinto
19th	G. I. Turnley	Democratic	January 13, 1885	January 11, 1887	Polk, San Jacinto
20th	Talvus A. Wilson	Democratic	January 11, 1887	January 8, 1889	Polk, San Jacinto
21st	Travis S. Cochran	Democratic	January 8, 1889	January 13, 1891	Polk, San Jacinto
22nd	Edward A. Patton	Republican	January 13, 1891	January 10, 1893	Polk, San Jacinto
23rd	Daniel D. Dodd	Democratic	January 10, 1893	January 8, 1895	Cass
24th	Howard F. O'Neal	Democratic	January 8, 1895	October 21, 1896	Cass
24th	Vacant	N/A	October 21, 1896	January 12, 1897	Cass
25th	Absolom C. Oliver	Democratic	January 12, 1897	January 10, 1899	Cass
26th	Absolom C. Oliver	Democratic	January 10, 1899	January 8, 1901	Cass
27th	James W. Hurt	Democratic	January 8, 1901	January 13, 1903	Cass
28th	James W. Hurt	Democratic	January 13, 1903	January 10, 1905	Cass
28th	George A. Trice	Democratic	January 13, 1903	January 10, 1905	Red River
29th	Charles E. Terry	Democratic	January 10, 1905	January 8, 1907	Red River
30th	Charles E. Terry	Democratic	January 8, 1907	January 12, 1909	Red River
31st	W. W. Lawson	Democratic	January 12, 1909	January 10, 1911	Red River
32nd	W. W. Lawson	Democratic	January 10, 1911	January 14, 1913	Red River
33rd	J. M. Rickerson	Democratic	January 14, 1913	January 12, 1915	Cass
34th	W. D. Lanier	Democratic	January 12, 1915	January 9, 1917	Cass
35th	W. D. Lanier	Democratic	January 9, 1917	January 14, 1919	Cass
36th	J. D. Newton	Democratic	January 14, 1919	January 11, 1921	Cass
37th	John W. W. Patman	Democratic	January 11, 1921	January 9, 1923	Cass
38th	John W. W. Patman	Democratic	January 9, 1923	January 13, 1925	Cass
39th	George W. Coody	Democratic	January 13, 1925	January 11, 1927	Cass
40th	J. D. Boon	Democratic	January 11, 1927	January 8, 1929	Cass
41st	Charles C. Hines	Democratic	January 8, 1929	January 13, 1931	Cass
42nd	Charles C. Hines	Democratic	January 13, 1931	January 10, 1933	Cass
43rd	Andrew L. Crossley Sr.	Democratic	January 10, 1933	January 8, 1935	Cass
44th	Andrew L. Crossley Sr.	Democratic	January 8, 1935	January 12, 1937	Cass
45th	Abe M. Mays Sr.	Democratic	January 12, 1937	January 10, 1939	Cass
46th	Abe M. Mays Sr.	Democratic	January 10, 1939	January 14, 1941	Cass
47th	J. K. Hileman	Democratic	January 14, 1941	January 12, 1943	Cass
48th	J. K. Hileman	Democratic	January 12, 1943	January 9, 1945	Cass
49th	William A. Barber Sr.	Democratic	January 9, 1945	January 14, 1947	Cass
50th	William A. Barber Sr.	Democratic	January 14, 1947	January 11, 1949	Cass
51st	Cloyd D. Young	Democratic	January 11, 1949	January 9, 1951	Cass
52nd	Cloyd D. Young	Democratic	January 9, 1951	January 13, 1953	Cass
53rd	James H. Jackson	Democratic	January 13, 1953	January 11, 1955	Cass
54th	James H. Jackson	Democratic	January 11, 1955	January 8, 1957	Cass
55th	Abe Mulker Mays Jr.	Democratic	January 8, 1957	January 13, 1959	Cass
56th	Abe Mulker Mays Jr.	Democratic	January 13, 1959	January 10, 1961	Cass
57th	James L. Slider	Democratic	January 10, 1961	January 8, 1963	Cass, Marion, Morris
58th	James L. Slider	Democratic	January 8, 1963	January 12, 1965	Cass, Marion, Morris
59th	James L. Slider	Democratic	January 12, 1965	January 10, 1967	Cass, Marion, Morris
60th	James L. Slider	Democratic	January 10, 1967	January 14, 1969	Cass, Marion, Morris, Titus
61st	James L. Slider	Democratic	January 14, 1969	January 12, 1971	Cass, Marion, Morris, Titus
62nd	James L. Slider	Democratic	January 12, 1971	January 9, 1973	Cass, Marion, Morris, Titus
63rd	Doyce R. Lee	Democratic	January 9, 1973	October 20, 1974	Cass, Marion, Morris, Smith, Upshur
63rd	Vacant	Democratic	October 20, 1974	January 14, 1975	Cass, Marion, Morris, Smith, Upshur
64th	James B. Florence	Democratic	January 14, 1975	January 11, 1977	Cass, Marion, Morris, Smith, Upshur
65th	James B. Florence	Democratic	January 11, 1977	January 9, 1979	Cass, Marion, Morris, Smith, Upshur
66th	James B. Florence	Democratic	January 9, 1979	January 13, 1981	Cass, Marion, Morris, Smith, Upshur
67th	James B. Florence	Democratic	January 13, 1981	January 11, 1983	Cass, Marion, Morris, Smith, Upshur
68th	Lyndon P. Patterson	Democratic	January 11, 1983	January 8, 1985	Delta, Fannin, Hopkins, Lamar
69th	Lyndon P. Patterson	Democratic	January 8, 1985	January 13, 1987	Delta, Fannin, Hopkins, Lamar
70th	Lyndon P. Patterson	Democratic	January 13, 1987	January 10, 1989	Delta, Fannin, Hopkins, Lamar
71st	Lyndon P. Patterson	Democratic	January 10, 1989	January 8, 1991	Delta, Fannin, Hopkins, Lamar
72nd	Lyndon P. Patterson	Democratic	January 8, 1991	January 12, 1993	Delta, Fannin, Hopkins, Lamar
73rd	Thomas D. Ramsay	Democratic	January 12, 1993	January 10, 1995	Camp, Franklin, Marion, Morris, Red River, Titus, Wood
74th	Thomas D. Ramsay	Democratic	January 10, 1995	January 14, 1997	Camp, Franklin, Marion, Morris, Red River, Titus, Wood
75th	Thomas D. Ramsay	Democratic	January 14, 1997	January 12, 1999	Camp, Franklin, Marion, Morris, Red River, Titus, Wood
76th	Thomas D. Ramsay	Democratic	January 12, 1999	January 9, 2001	Camp, Franklin, Marion, Morris, Red River, Titus, Wood
77th	Thomas D. Ramsay	Democratic	January 9, 2001	January 14, 2003	Camp, Franklin, Marion, Morris, Red River, Titus, Wood
78th	Dan Flynn	Republican	January 14, 2003	January 11, 2005	Hunt, Rains, Van Zandt
79th	Dan Flynn	Republican	January 11, 2005	January 9, 2007	Hunt, Rains, Van Zandt
80th	Dan Flynn	Republican	January 9, 2007	January 13, 2009	Hunt, Rains, Van Zandt
81st	Dan Flynn	Republican	January 13, 2009	January 11, 2011	Hunt, Rains, Van Zandt
82nd	Dan Flynn	Republican	January 11, 2011	January 8, 2013	Hunt, Rains, Van Zandt
83rd	Dan Flynn	Republican	January 8, 2013	January 13, 2015	Hopkins, Hunt, Van Zandt
84th	Dan Flynn	Republican	January 13, 2015	January 10, 2017	Hopkins, Hunt, Van Zandt
85th	Dan Flynn	Republican	January 10, 2017	January 8, 2019	Hopkins, Hunt, Van Zandt
86th	Dan Flynn	Republican	January 8, 2019	January 12, 2021	Hopkins, Hunt, Van Zandt
87th	Bryan Slaton	Republican	January 12, 2021	January 10, 2023	Hopkins, Hunt, Van Zandt
88th	Bryan Slaton	Republican	January 10, 2023	May 8, 2023	Hopkins, Hunt, Van Zandt
88th	Vacant	N/A	May 8, 2023	February 14, 2024	Hopkins, Hunt, Van Zandt
88th	Jill Dutton	Republican	February 14, 2024	January 14, 2025	Hopkins, Hunt, Van Zandt
89th	Brent Money	Republican	January 14, 2025	Present	Hopkins, Hunt, Van Zandt

== Past living Representatives ==
Representative	Legislature(s)	Term(s)	Birth date and age
Bryan Slaton	87th – 88th	2021 – 2023	February 2, 1978 (age 48)
Jill Dutton	88th	2024–2025	
