= Dade Phelan =

American businessman and politician (born 1975)

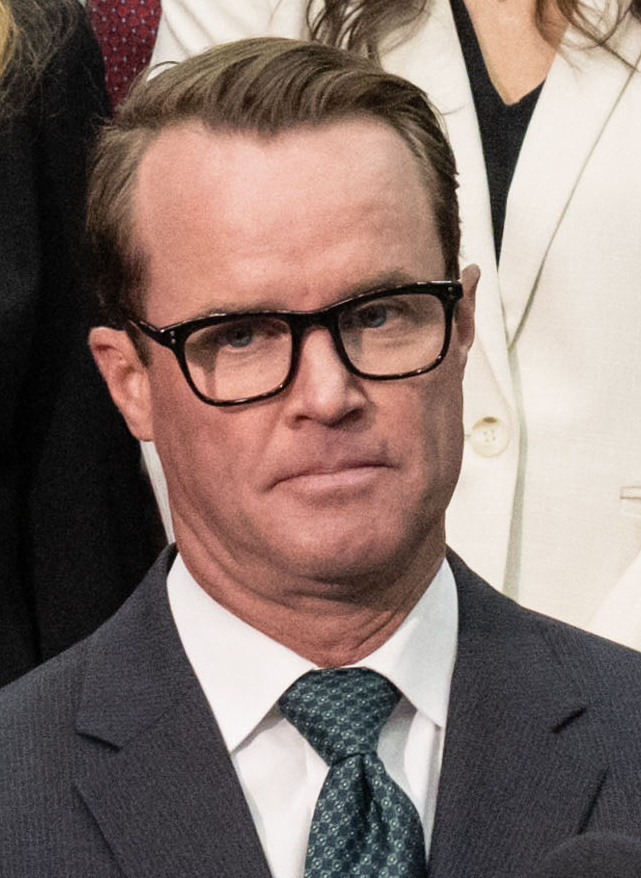
- Phelan in 2024

Speaker of the Texas House of Representatives
- In office January 12, 2021 – January 14, 2025
- Preceded by: Dennis Bonnen
- Succeeded by: Dustin Burrows

Member of the Texas House of Representatives from the 21st district
- Incumbent
- Assumed office January 13, 2015
- Preceded by: Allan Ritter
- Succeeded by: Ray Callas (elect)

Personal details
- Born: Matthew McDade Phelan; September 18, 1975 (age 51) Beaumont, Texas, U.S.
- Party: Republican
- Spouse: Kimberly Ware
- Children: 4
- Education: University of Texas at Austin (BA)

Matthew McDade Phelan (born September 18, 1975) is an American real estate developer and politician. A member of the Republican Party, he serves in Texas House of Representatives representing District 21, which includes most of Jefferson and all of Orange and Jasper counties in the southeast corner of the state. He served as the speaker of the Texas House of Representatives from 2021 to 2025.

== Background ==
Phelan is a 1994 graduate of Monsignor Kelly Catholic High School in Beaumont. He graduated from the University of Texas at Austin with a Bachelor of Arts in government in May 1998.

== Texas Legislature ==
From 2021 through 2024, Phelan was Speaker of the Texas House of Representatives. He was previously Chair of the House Committee on State Affairs, on the Natural Resources Committee as Vice-Chair, the Calendars Committee, the Appropriations Committee, Elections Committee as well as the Select Committee on Ports, Innovation and Infrastructure. He is also a founding member of the House Criminal Justice Reform Caucus.

Texas Monthly recognized Phelan as one of the best legislators of 2019.

On December 2, 2020, Phelan was traveling in a private plane to meet Representative Trent Ashby when it crashed on landing during a rainstorm at Angelina County Airport near Lufkin, Texas. There were no serious injuries.

=== Speaker of the Texas House of Representatives ===
On January 12, 2021, Phelan was elected the 76th Speaker of the Texas House of Representatives.

==== Voting rights ====
On August 12, 2021, Phelan signed arrest warrants for the 52 Democratic lawmakers who had left the state to deny a quorum. The lawmakers were attempting to block the passage of legislation considered by certain civil rights groups to restrict voting access to voters of color. During the House debate on the bill, Phelan banned Texas representatives from using the word "racism".

==== Call for resignation and Paxton impeachment ====
On May 19, 2023, a Republican-led House committee came public with an investigation into Ken Paxton that had been ongoing since March of that year. Paxton then called upon Phelan to resign due to "apparent debilitating intoxication" based on a video clip of Phelan struggling to speak during a House session. Phelan's office characterized Paxton's statement as "a last-ditch effort to save face" given the timing on the investigation into Paxton going public that same day. That investigation led to the House formally impeaching Paxton on May 27 by a vote of 121–23.

On September 16, 2023, Ken Paxton was acquitted of all sixteen corruption charges brought at the impeachment trial.

==== 2024 election ====
On February 10, 2024, Phelan was censured by the Texas Republican Party for the impeachment of Texas Attorney General Ken Paxton. During the 2024 Republican primary, Phelan was endorsed by former Texas governor Rick Perry. He faced a primary challenge by David Covey, the former Republican Chairman of Orange County. Covey was endorsed by attorney general Paxton, lieutenant governor Dan Patrick, and former U.S. President Donald Trump. As no candidate received a majority of the vote in the first round, a runoff election was held. Phelan won the primary by 50.7% to Covey's 49.3%.

Phelan ran unopposed in the 2024 general election. After the election, he announced he would not seek a third term as Speaker of the House and in August of 2025, announced that he would not seek a seventh term in the state House. Beaumont physician Ray Callas won the Republican primary to succeed Phelan unopposed.

==== Artificial intelligence ====
During the 2025 Texas state legislative session, Phelan emphasized the urgency of Texas Senate Bill 20 to deal with A.I. and child pornography, adding that they need to "put some guardrails on it to where the public is being taken care of." The law creates new criminal offenses for those who possess, promote, or view visual material deemed obscene, which is said to depict a child, whether it is an actual person, animated or cartoon depiction, or an image of someone created through computer software or artificial intelligence.

Phelan also authored House Bill 366 which would penalize campaigns if they failed to disclose whether certain political advertisements used images or audio generated or altered by A.I. Critics of the bill argued that the legislation would police political speech or punish the creators of political memes. The bill passed by the House of Representatives, but stalled in the Senate.

== Personal life ==
Phelan is Catholic; he and his wife, Kimberly (née Ware) Phelan, have four children. In 2024, the University of Texas at Austin recognized Phelan with the Presidential Citation Award.

== Electoral history ==
Texas House of Representatives District 21 Republican primary results, 2014
| Party | Candidate | Votes | % |
|---|---|---|---|
| Republican | Dade Phelan | 7,942 | 59.90% |
| Republican | Judy Nichols | 5,316 | 40.10% |
| Total votes | | 13,258 | 100.00% |

Texas House of Representatives District 21 General Election, 2014
| Party | Candidate | Votes | % |
|---|---|---|---|
| Republican | Dade Phelan | 28,283 | 74.39% |
| Democratic | Gavin Bruney | 9,739 | 25.61% |
| Total votes | | 38,022 | 100.00% |
| Republican hold | | | |

Texas House of Representatives District 21 General Election, 2016
| Party | Candidate | Votes | % |
|---|---|---|---|
| Republican | Dade Phelan (incumbent) | 54,753 | 100.00% |
| Total votes | | 54,753 | 100.00% |
| Republican hold | | | |

Texas House of Representatives District 21 General Election, 2018
| Party | Candidate | Votes | % |
|---|---|---|---|
| Republican | Dade Phelan (incumbent) | 46,435 | 100.00% |
| Total votes | | 46,435 | 100.00% |
| Republican hold | | | |

Texas House of Representatives District 21 General Election, 2020
| Party | Candidate | Votes | % |
|---|---|---|---|
| Republican | Dade Phelan (incumbent) | 65,689 | 100.00% |
| Total votes | | 65,689 | 100.00% |
| Republican hold | | | |

Texas House of Representatives District 21 General Election, 2022
| Party | Candidate | Votes | % |
|---|---|---|---|
| Republican | Dade Phelan (incumbent) | 0 | 100.00% |
| Total votes | | 0 | 100.00% |
| Republican hold | | | |

Texas House of Representatives District 21 Republican primary results, 2024
| Party | Candidate | Votes | % |
|---|---|---|---|
| Republican | David Covey | 15,589 | 46.28% |
| Republican | Dade Phelan (incumbent) | 14,574 | 43.27% |
| Republican | Alicia Davis | 3,523 | 10.45% |
| Total votes | | 33,686 | 100.00% |

Republican primary runoff results, 2024
| Party | Candidate | Votes | % |
|---|---|---|---|
| Republican | Dade Phelan (incumbent) | 12,813 | 50.72% |
| Republican | David Covey | 12,447 | 49.28% |
| Total votes | | 25,260 | 100.00% |

Texas House of Representatives District 21 General Election, 2024
| Party | Candidate | Votes | % |
|---|---|---|---|
| Republican | Dade Phelan (incumbent) | 66,398 | 100.00% |
| Total votes | | 66,398 | 100.00% |
| Republican hold | | | |

Texas House of Representatives
| Preceded by Allan Ritter | Member of the Texas House of Representatives from the 21st district 2015–present | Incumbent |
Political offices
| Preceded by Dennis Bonnen | Speaker of the Texas House of Representatives; 2021–2025 | Succeeded by Dustin Burrows |
