= Bryan Slaton =

American politician (born 1978)

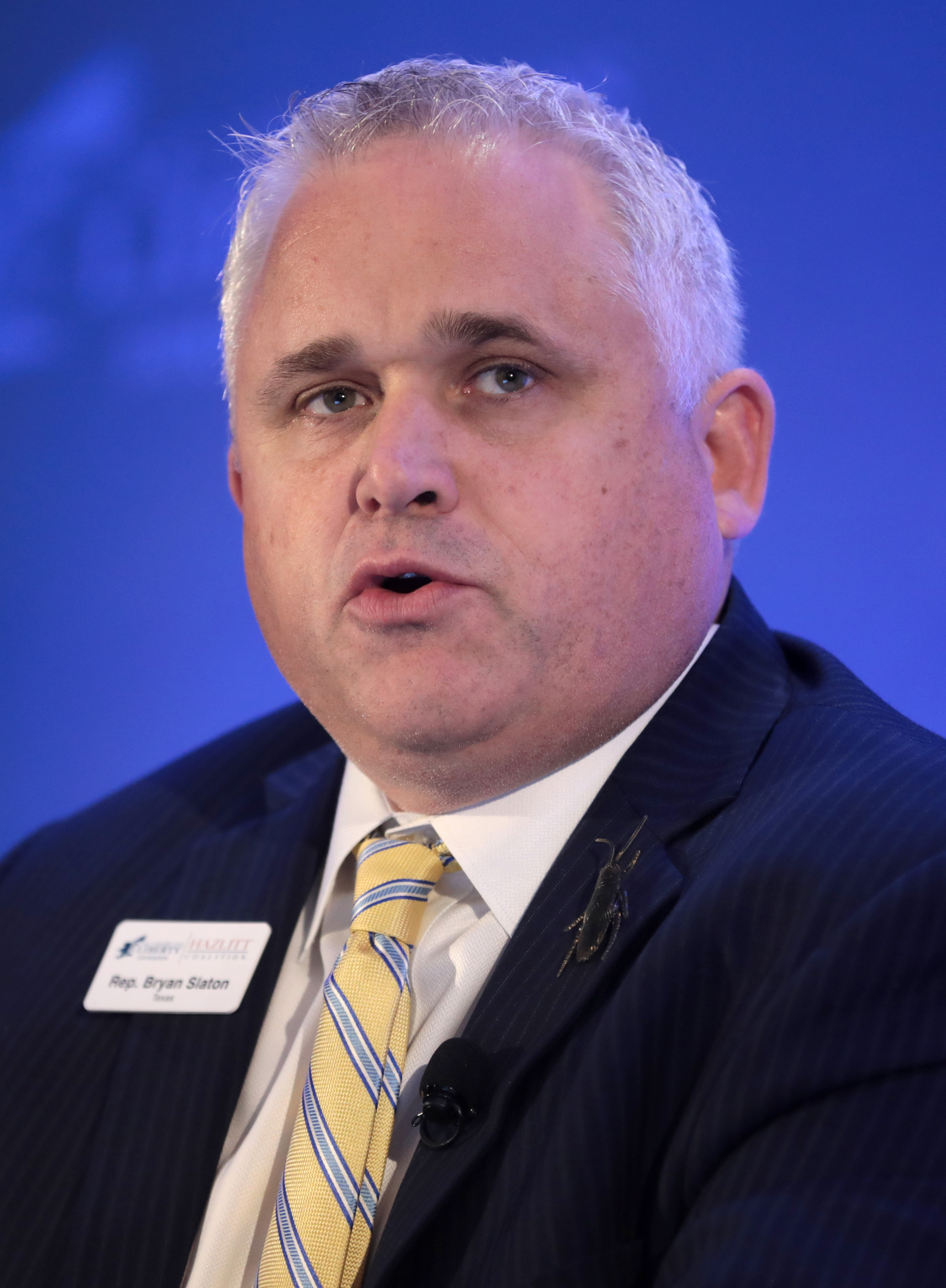
- Slaton at the 2022 Hazlitt Summit hosted by Young Americans for Liberty Foundation

Member of the Texas House of Representatives from the 2nd district
- In office January 12, 2021 – May 8, 2023
- Preceded by: Dan Flynn
- Succeeded by: Jill Dutton

Personal details
- Born: February 2, 1978 (age 48) Mineola, Texas, U.S.
- Party: Republican
- Spouse: Sharmen
- Children: 2
- Education: Ouachita Baptist University (BA); University of North Texas (BA); Southwestern Baptist Theological Seminary (M.Div.)
- Occupation: Pastor; Financial Services

Bryan Lee Slaton (born February 2, 1978) is a former pastor and American politician. A member of the Republican Party, Slaton represented the 2nd district in the Texas House of Representatives from 2021 to 2023. Slaton also works for his family business, Slaton Financial Services.

In May 2023, Slaton resigned and was later expelled from the Texas House in a unanimous vote of 147-0 after a committee report found that Slaton had provided alcohol to, and had sex with, a 19-year-old female legislative aide under his employ who was "unable to give effective consent." He was the first member of the Texas Legislature to be expelled since H. H. Moore and Francis Aaron Dale were expelled in 1927.

== Early life, education, and career ==
Slaton was born on February 2, 1978, in Mineola, Texas. He attended Ouachita Baptist University, where he received a BA in youth ministry and speech communication. He then attended University of North Texas and earned a degree in accounting. Slaton later earned a Master of Divinity from Southwestern Baptist Theological Seminary. He served in the ministry as a youth and family minister for 13 years, for three of those years at River Hills Baptist Church in Corpus Christi, Texas. Bryan works for his brother's small business, Slaton Financial Services.

== Early political career ==
In 2016, Slaton challenged incumbent state representative Dan Flynn, losing in the Republican primary 51 percent to 49 percent. Flynn defeated Slayton again in the 2018 primary, 52 percent to 48 percent.

During the 2020 primary, Slaton led Flynn by a 22-point margin, forcing a runoff election as neither had a majority. Slaton positioned himself as more conservative than Flynn and criticized Flynn over Flynn's spending. He sent out mail which pointed out Flynn's campaign-funded lifestyle expenses such as nearly $14,000 in spending on cookies and using his campaign fund to pay for a Netflix subscription. Slaton campaigned on abolishing property taxes, ending overly broad laws that give government excess power during emergencies, and pledging to oppose any tax increase.

== Texas House of Representatives ==
In March 2021, Slaton introduced a bill that would abolish abortion and make it a criminal act, whereby women and physicians who received and performed abortions, respectively, could receive the death penalty. The bill made no exceptions for rape or incest; it did provide exemptions for ectopic pregnancies that threaten the life of the woman "when a reasonable alternative to save the lives of both the mother and the unborn child is unavailable."

In June 2022, Slaton said in a social media post that he planned to introduce legislation in the 2023 legislative session that would ban minors from drag shows in Texas.

Slaton supports a ban on Democrats being given committee chairmanships as long as the Republicans hold the majority of seats in the Texas House. On December 6, 2022, Slaton proposed a rule change to the Texas House Administration Committee that would end Democrats receiving committee chairmanships. On February 27, 2023, Slaton introduced HB 2889, which would allow a tax credit for married residents of Texas that would increase as the number of children increases, either by procreation or adoption.

On March 6, 2023, Slaton introduced HB 3596, the "Texas Independence Referendum Act" (TEXIT), which would allow for a referendum to investigate the secession of Texas from the U.S. The U.S. Supreme Court case Texas v. White ruled in 1869 that the Constitution did not permit states to unilaterally secede from the United States.

=== Sexual misconduct controversy, expulsion and resignation ===
On April 10, 2023, a complaint surfaced alleging Slaton had been in an "inappropriate relationship" with an intern who worked for his office, over the previous month, culminating in a late-night incident involving alcohol. Representatives Briscoe Cain and Steve Toth, both Republicans, were the first to call for Slaton's resignation. According to The Texas Tribune, "[t]he resignation calls by Cain and Toth are noteworthy. The two are members of the staunchly conservative Texas House Freedom Caucus, which takes positions that usually align with Slaton's."

The incident was investigated by the House Committee on General Investigating, (Note: The Committee consists of five members, three Republicans (including the chair) and two Democrats (including the vice chair), all appointed by the Speaker.) which published a report in May 2023 unanimously recommending Slaton's expulsion from the House, and detailing that he had committed the crimes of providing alcohol to a minor, abuse of official capacity, and official oppression. The committee's report stated that Slaton had invited a 19-year-old aide to his home at around 10 p.m. on March 30, 2023, telling her that he "did not want to drink by himself." Friends of the aide accompanied her as a "protective measure," with their presence surprising Slaton. At his home, Slaton provided alcohol to all of them. The staff member testified that she drank a "lot of alcohol," felt "pretty rough" and "really dizzy." When the friends left Slaton's home and she attempted to get up to leave as well, Slaton told her in front of the others that she "did not have to leave if she did not want to," and she stayed. The aide later testified that this was "an inappropriate situation ... because I had too much to drink."

A co-worker of the aide testified that the aide later confided that she had unprotected sex with Slaton. The committee report further details that the aide bought the Plan B emergency contraceptive the next day.

The committee reported that Slaton did not deny the allegation of having sex with the aide, and that neither Slaton nor his attorney provided any evidence to contradict the allegations. Instead, Slaton's attorney advocated that the complaints against the representative should be rejected because the alleged incident with the intern occurred in Slaton's home, not in their workplace.

On May 8, 2023, Slaton resigned his seat. On May 10, 2023, Slaton was expelled from the Texas House by a unanimous vote of 147–0, (Note: The three members not voting were Slaton (who was absent), Sherman (who had previously been excused from attendance), and Davis (who was absent).) making him the first member to be expelled from the Texas Legislature since 1927. The expulsion prevented Slaton from receiving a salary and benefits until the election of his successor.

== Personal life ==
Slaton married his second wife in 2017; she filed for divorce in April 2022 then withdrew it in November 2022.

== Notes ==
Texas House of Representatives
Preceded by Dan Flynn	Member of the Texas House of Representatives from the 2nd district 2021–2023	Succeeded by Jill Dutton
