= Texas House of Representatives =

Lower house of the Texas Legislature

- 89th Texas Legislature

Type
- Type: Lower house of the Texas Legislature
- Term limits: None

History
- New session started: January 14, 2025

Leadership
- Speaker: Dustin Burrows (R) since January 14, 2025
- Speaker pro tempore: Joe Moody (D) since February 13, 2025
- Majority Leader: Tom Oliverson (R) since April 3, 2024
- Minority Leader: Gene Wu (D) since January 14, 2025

Structure
- Seats: 150
- Political groups: Majority: Republican (88); Minority: Democratic (62)
- Length of term: 2 years
- Authority: Article 3, Texas Constitution
- Salary: $7,200/year + per diem

Elections
- Voting system: First-past-the-post
- Last election: November 3, 2026
- Next election: November 7, 2028
- Redistricting: Legislative control

Meeting place
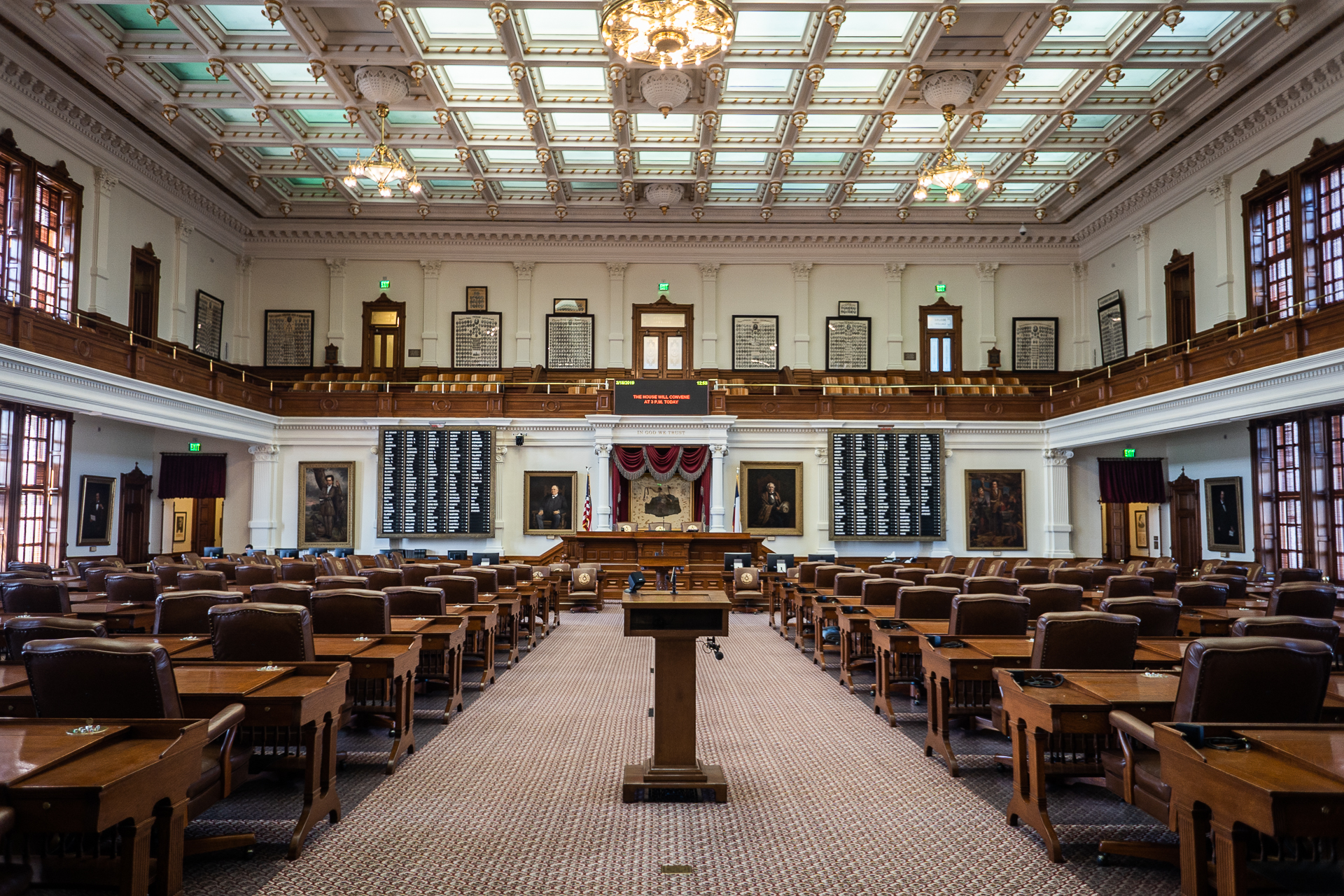
- House of Representatives Chamber; Texas State Capitol; Austin, Texas

Website
- Texas House of Representatives

The Texas House of Representatives is the lower house of the bicameral Texas Legislature. It consists of 150 members who are elected from single-member districts for two-year terms. There are no term limits. The House meets at the State Capitol in Austin.

== District apportionment ==
Under Article III, Section 26 of the Texas Constitution, House districts are subject to the "county line rule," which requires districts to follow county boundaries wherever possible. A county entitled by population to one or more whole districts must receive that number of districts entirely within its boundaries. Any surplus population may be combined with population from adjacent counties to form an additional district. Counties with insufficient population for a single district are combined with adjacent counties. Limited exceptions are permitted when necessary to comply with federal requirements for substantially equal district populations. The county line rule also limits opportunities for gerrymandering by restricting the division of counties among legislative districts.

== Leadership ==
The leadership for the 89th Legislature is as follows:

Position	Name	Party	Residence	District
Speaker of the House	Dustin Burrows	Republican	Lubbock	83
Speaker Pro Tempore	Joe Moody	Democratic	El Paso	78
Republican Caucus Chair	Tom Oliverson	Republican	Cypress	130
Democratic House Leader	Gene Wu	Democratic	Houston	137

The Speaker of the House is the presiding officer and highest-ranking member of the House. The Speaker's duties include maintaining order within the House, recognizing members during debate, ruling on procedural matters, appointing members to the various committees and sending bills for committee review.

The Speaker pro tempore is primarily a ceremonial position, but does, by long-standing tradition, preside over the House during its consideration of local and consent bills.

Unlike other state legislatures, the House rules do not formally recognize majority or minority leaders. The unofficial leaders are the Republican Caucus Chairman and the Democratic House Leader, both of whom are elected by their respective caucuses.

== Composition ==
Republicans currently hold a majority of seats in the House.

Affiliation	Party (Shading indicates majority caucus)			Total	Vacant
Affiliation	Republican	Democratic	Independent	Total	Vacant
End 2010	75	73	0	148	2
Begin 2011	101	49	0	150	0
End 2012	101	48	0	149	1
Begin 2013	95	55	0	150	0
End 2014	95	55	0	150	0
Begin 2015	98	52	0	150	0
End 2016	99	50	1	150	0
Begin 2017	95	55	0	150	0
End 2018	94	56	0	150	0
2019–2020	83	67	0	150	0
Begin 2021 (Note: Republican Drew Springer (District 68) resigned intersession on December 19, 2020, after being elected in a special election to the Texas Senate.)	82	67	0	149	1
End 2022	85	65	0	150	0
Begin 2023	86	64	0	150	0
May 9, 2023 (Note: Republican Bryan Slaton (District 2) was expelled from the House for inappropriate conduct with one of his interns.)	85	64	0	149	1
February 14, 2024 (Note: Republican Jill Dutton was sworn in to succeed Slaton.)	86	64	0	150	0
August 15, 2024 (Note: Republican Charles Anderson (District 56) resigned.)	85	64	0	149	1
August 30, 2024 (Note: Democrat Shawn Thierry (District 146) switched parties to Republican.)	86	63	0	149	1
Begin 2025	88	62	0	150	0
July 2, 2026 (Note: Republican Nate Schatzline (District 93) resigned.)	87	62	0	149	1
September 21, 2026 (Note: Republican Gary VanDeaver (District 1) resigned.)	86	62	0	148	2
Latest voting share	58.1%	41.9%			

Current House districts and party affiliation Republican Party Democratic Party

== List of current representatives ==
District	Name	Party	Start	Residence	Counties
1	Vacant				Bowie, Cass, Lamar, Morris, Red River
2	Brent Money	Republican	2025	Greenville	Hopkins, Hunt, Van Zandt
3	Cecil Bell Jr.	Republican	2013	Magnolia	Montgomery
4	Keith Bell	Republican	2019	Forney	Henderson, Kaufman
5	Cole Hefner	Republican	2017	Mount Pleasant	Camp, Rains, Smith, Titus, Upshur, Wood
6	Daniel Alders	Republican	2025	Tyler	Smith
7	Jay Dean	Republican	2017	Longview	Gregg, Harrison, Marion
8	Cody Harris	Republican	2019	Palestine	Anderson, Cherokee, Henderson, Navarro
9	Trent Ashby	Republican	2013	Lufkin	Angelina, Houston, Polk, San Augustine, Trinity, Tyler
10	Brian Harrison	Republican	2021	Midlothian	Ellis
11	Joanne Shofner	Republican	2025	Nacogdoches	Nacogdoches, Newton, Panola, Rusk, Sabine, Shelby
12	Trey Wharton	Republican	2025	Huntsville	Brazos, Grimes, Madison, Robertson, Walker, Washington
13	Angelia Orr	Republican	2023	Itasca	Bosque, Falls, Freestone, Hill, Leon, Limestone, McLennan
14	Paul Dyson	Republican	2025	Bryan	Brazos
15	Steve Toth	Republican	2019	Conroe	Montgomery
16	Will Metcalf	Republican	2015	Conroe	Montgomery
17	Stan Gerdes	Republican	2023	Smithville	Bastrop, Burleson, Caldwell, Lee, Milam
18	Janis Holt	Republican	2025	Silsbee	Hardin, Liberty, Montgomery, San Jacinto
19	Ellen Troxclair	Republican	2023	Lakeway	Blanco, Burnet, Gillespie, Kendall, Travis
20	Terry Wilson	Republican	2017	Georgetown	Williamson
21	Dade Phelan	Republican	2015	Beaumont	Jasper, Jefferson, Orange
22	Christian Manuel	Democratic	2023	Beaumont	Jefferson
23	Terri Leo-Wilson	Republican	2023	Galveston	Chambers, Galveston
24	Greg Bonnen	Republican	2013	Friendswood	Galveston
25	Cody Vasut	Republican	2021	Angleton	Brazoria
26	Matt Morgan	Republican	2025	Richmond	Fort Bend
27	Ron Reynolds	Democratic	2011	Missouri City	Fort Bend
28	Gary Gates	Republican	2020	Richmond	Fort Bend
29	Jeffrey Barry	Republican	2025	Pearland	Brazoria
30	A.J. Louderback	Republican	2025	Victoria	De Witt, Goliad, Jackson, Lavaca, Matagorda, Victoria
31	Ryan Guillen	Republican (Note: Elected as a Democrat but switched parties on November 15, 2021)	2003	Rio Grande City	Brooks, Duval, Jim Hogg, Karnes, Kenedy, La Salle, Live Oak, McMullen, Starr, Wilson, Zapata
32	Todd Ames Hunter	Republican	2009	Corpus Christi	Aransas, Nueces
33	Katrina Pierson	Republican	2025	Rockwall	Collin, Rockwall
34	Denise Villalobos	Republican	2025	Corpus Christi	Nueces
35	Oscar Longoria	Democratic	2013	Mission	Cameron, Hidalgo
36	Sergio Muñoz	Democratic	2011	Mission	Hidalgo
37	Janie Lopez	Republican	2023	San Benito	Cameron, Willacy
38	Erin Gamez	Democratic	2022	Brownsville	Cameron
39	Armando Martinez	Democratic	2005	Weslaco	Hidalgo
40	Terry Canales	Democratic	2013	Edinburg	Hidalgo
41	Robert Guerra	Democratic	2012	Mission	Hidalgo
42	Richard Raymond	Democratic	2001	Laredo	Webb
43	José Manuel Lozano	Republican	2011	Kingsville	Bee, Calhoun, Jim Wells, Kleberg, Refugio, San Patricio
44	Alan Schoolcraft	Republican	2025	McQueeney	Gonzalez, Guadalupe
45	Erin Zwiener	Democratic	2019	Driftwood	Hays
46	Sheryl Cole	Democratic	2019	Austin	Travis
47	Vikki Goodwin	Democratic	2019	Austin	Travis
48	Donna Howard	Democratic	2006	Austin	Travis
49	Gina Hinojosa	Democratic	2017	Austin	Travis
50	James Talarico	Democratic	2018	Austin	Travis
51	Lulu Flores	Democratic	2023	Austin	Travis
52	Caroline Harris Davila	Republican	2023	Round Rock	Williamson
53	Wes Virdell	Republican	2025	Brady	Bandera, Crane, Crockett, Edwards, Kerr, Kimble, Llano, Mason, McCulloch, Medina, Menard, Pecos, Real, Schleicher, Sutton, Upton
54	Brad Buckley	Republican	2019	Salado	Bell
55	Hillary Hickland	Republican	2025	Belton	Bell
56	Pat Curry	Republican	2024	Waco	McLennan
57	Richard Hayes	Republican	2023	Hickory Creek	Denton
58	Helen Kerwin	Republican	2025	Glen Rose	Johnson, Somervell
59	Shelby Slawson	Republican	2021	Stephenville	Coryell, Erath, Hamilton, Hood
60	Mike Olcott	Republican	2025	Fort Worth	Palo Pinto, Parker, Stephens
61	Keresa Richardson	Republican	2025	McKinney	Collin
62	Shelley Luther	Republican	2025	Tom Bean	Delta, Fannin, Franklin, Grayson
63	Ben Bumgarner	Republican	2023	Flower Mound	Denton
64	Andy Hopper	Republican	2025	Decatur	Denton, Wise
65	Mitch Little	Republican	2025	Lewisville	Denton
66	Matt Shaheen	Republican	2015	Plano	Collin
67	Jeff Leach	Republican	2013	Plano	Collin
68	David Spiller	Republican	2021	Jacksboro	Brown, Cooke, Eastland, Jack, Lampasas, Mills, Montague, San Saba, Shackelford, Throckmorton, Young
69	James Frank	Republican	2013	Wichita Falls	Archer, Baylor, Clay, Cottle, Fisher, Foard, Hardeman, Haskell, King, Knox, Motley, Stonewall, Wichita, Wilbarger
70	Mihaela Plesa	Democratic	2023	Dallas	Collin
71	Stan Lambert	Republican	2017	Abilene	Callahan, Jones, Nolan, Taylor
72	Drew Darby	Republican	2007	San Angelo	Coke, Coleman, Concho, Glasscock, Howard, Irion, Reagan, Runnels, Sterling, Tom Green
73	Carrie Isaac	Republican	2023	Dripping Springs	Comal, Hays
74	Eddie Morales	Democratic	2021	Eagle Pass	Brewster, Culberson, El Paso, Hudspeth, Jeff Davis, Kinney, Maverick, Presidio, Reeves, Terrell, Val Verde
75	Mary González	Democratic	2013	Clint	El Paso
76	Suleman Lalani	Democratic	2023	Sugar Land	Fort Bend
77	Vincent Perez	Democratic	2025	El Paso	El Paso
78	Joe Moody	Democratic	2013	El Paso	El Paso
79	Claudia Ordaz	Democratic	2021	El Paso	El Paso
80	Don McLaughlin	Republican	2025	Uvalde	Atacscosa, Dimmit, Frio, Uvalde, Webb, Zavala
81	Brooks Landgraf	Republican	2015	Odessa	Ector, Loving, Ward, Winkler
82	Tom Craddick	Republican	1969	Midland	Dawson, Martin, Midland
83	Dustin Burrows	Republican	2015	Lubbock	Borden, Crosby, Dickens, Floyd, Garza, Kent, Lubbock, Lynn, Mitchell, Scurry, Terry
84	Carl Tepper	Republican	2023	Lubbock	Lubbock
85	Stan Kitzman	Republican	2023	Pattison	Austin, Colorado, Fayette, Fort Bend, Waller, Wharton
86	John T. Smithee	Republican	1985	Amarillo	Armstrong, Dallam, Deaf Smith, Hartley, Oldham, Parmer, Randall
87	Caroline Fairly	Republican	2025	Amarillo	Carson, Hansford, Hutchinson, Lipscomb, Moore, Ochilitree, Potter, Sherman
88	Ken King	Republican	2013	Canadian	Andrews, Bailey, Briscoe, Castro, Childress, Cochran, Collingsworth, Donley, Gaines, Gray, Hale, Hall, Hansford, Hemphill, Hockley, Lamb, Roberts, Swisher, Wheeler, Yoakum
89	Candy Noble	Republican	2019	Lucas	Collin
90	Ramon Romero Jr.	Democratic	2015	Fort Worth	Tarrant
91	David Lowe	Republican	2025	North Richland Hills	Tarrant
92	Salman Bhojani	Democratic	2023	Euless	Tarrant
93	Vacant				Tarrant
94	Tony Tinderholt	Republican	2015	Arlington	Tarrant
95	Nicole Collier	Democratic	2013	Fort Worth	Tarrant
96	David Cook	Republican	2021	Mansfield	Tarrant
97	John McQueeney	Republican	2025	Fort Worth	Tarrant
98	Giovanni Capriglione	Republican	2013	Southlake	Tarrant
99	Charlie Geren	Republican	2001	Fort Worth	Tarrant
100	Venton Jones	Democratic	2023	Dallas	Dallas
101	Chris Turner	Democratic	2013	Grand Prairie	Tarrant
102	Ana-Maria Ramos	Democratic	2019	Richardson	Dallas
103	Rafael Anchía	Democratic	2005	Dallas	Dallas
104	Jessica González	Democratic	2019	Dallas	Dallas
105	Terry Meza	Democratic	2019	Irving	Dallas
106	Jared Patterson	Republican	2019	Frisco	Denton
107	Linda Garcia	Democratic	2025	Mesquite	Dallas
108	Morgan Meyer	Republican	2015	University Park	Dallas
109	Aicha Davis	Democratic	2025	Dallas	Dallas
110	Toni Rose	Democratic	2013	Dallas	Dallas
111	Yvonne Davis	Democratic	1993	Dallas	Dallas
112	Angie Chen Button	Republican	2009	Garland	Dallas
113	Rhetta Bowers	Democratic	2019	Rowlett	Dallas
114	John Bryant	Democratic	2023	Dallas	Dallas
115	Cassandra Hernandez	Democratic	2025	Farmers Branch	Dallas
116	Trey Martinez Fischer	Democratic	2019	San Antonio	Bexar
117	Philip Cortez	Democratic	2017	San Antonio	Bexar
118	John Lujan	Republican	2021	San Antonio	Bexar
119	Elizabeth Campos	Democratic	2021	San Antonio	Bexar
120	Barbara Gervin-Hawkins	Democratic	2017	San Antonio	Bexar
121	Marc LaHood	Republican	2025	San Antonio	Bexar
122	Mark Dorazio	Republican	2023	San Antonio	Bexar
123	Diego Bernal	Democratic	2015	San Antonio	Bexar
124	Josey Garcia	Democratic	2023	San Antonio	Bexar
125	Ray Lopez	Democratic	2019	San Antonio	Bexar
126	Sam Harless	Republican	2019	Spring	Harris
127	Charles Cunningham	Republican	2023	Humble	Harris
128	Briscoe Cain	Republican	2017	Deer Park	Harris
129	Dennis Paul	Republican	2015	Houston	Harris
130	Tom Oliverson	Republican	2017	Cypress	Harris
131	Alma Allen	Democratic	2005	Houston	Harris
132	Mike Schofield	Republican	2021	Katy	Harris
133	Mano DeAyala	Republican	2023	Houston	Harris
134	Ann Johnson	Democratic	2021	Houston	Harris
135	Jon Rosenthal	Democratic	2019	Houston	Harris
136	John Bucy III	Democratic	2019	Austin	Williamson
137	Gene Wu	Democratic	2013	Houston	Harris
138	Lacey Hull	Republican	2021	Houston	Harris
139	Charlene Ward Johnson	Democratic	2025	Houston	Harris
140	Armando Walle	Democratic	2009	Houston	Harris
141	Senfronia Thompson	Democratic	1973	Houston	Harris
142	Harold Dutton Jr.	Democratic	1985	Houston	Harris
143	Ana Hernandez	Democratic	2005	Houston	Harris
144	Mary Ann Perez	Democratic	2017	Houston	Harris
145	Christina Morales	Democratic	2019	Houston	Harris
146	Lauren Ashley Simmons	Democratic	2025	Houston	Harris
147	Jolanda Jones	Democratic	2022	Houston	Harris
148	Penny Morales Shaw	Democratic	2021	Houston	Harris
149	Hubert Vo	Democratic	2005	Houston	Harris
150	Valoree Swanson	Republican	2017	Spring	Harris

=== Notable past members ===
- Eligio (Kika) De La Garza, II, first Mexican-American to represent his region in the US House and the second Mexican-American from Texas to be elected to Congress (1965–1997).
- Ray Barnhart, Federal Highway Administrator (1981–1987)
- Anita Lee Blair, first blind woman elected to a state legislature
- Jack Brooks, U.S. Representative (1953–1995)
- Dolph Briscoe, Governor of Texas (1973–1979)
- Frank Kell Cahoon, Midland County oilman and representative from 1965 to 1969; only Republican member in 1965 legislative session
- Joaquin Castro, U.S. Representative (2013–present)
- Jasmine Crockett, U.S. Representative (2023–present)
- Henry Cuellar, U.S. Representative (2005–present)
- Tom DeLay, U.S. Representative (1985–2006) and House Majority Leader (2003–2005)
- Jake Ellzey, U.S. Representative (2022–present)
- Pat Fallon, U.S. Representative (2021–present)
- John Nance Garner, U.S. Representative (1903–1933), Speaker of the House (1931–1933), and Vice President of the United States (1933–1941)
- Craig Goldman, U.S. Representative (2025-present)
- Lance Gooden, U.S. Representative (2019–present)
- Sarah T. Hughes, United States district court judge
- Suzanna Hupp, House of Representatives (1997–2007), survived the Luby's shooting, went on to champion individual gun ownership and carry rights.
- Kay Bailey Hutchison, U.S. Senator (1993–2013)
- Ray Hutchinson, husband of Kay Bailey Hutchison
- Eddie Bernice Johnson, first Black woman ever elected to public office from Dallas, first woman in Texas history to lead a major Texas House committee (the Labor Committee), and the first registered nurse elected to Congress.
- Julie Johnson, U.S. Representative (2025-present)
- Samuel Ealy Johnson, Jr., father of President Lyndon B. Johnson (1963–1969)
- Mickey Leland, U.S. Representative (1979–1989), died in a plane crash.
- Charles Henry Nimitz (1826–1911) Born in Bremen. In 1852, built the Nimitz Hotel in Fredericksburg, which now houses the National Museum of the Pacific War. Grandfather of United States Fleet Admiral Chester Nimitz. Elected to the Texas Legislature 1890.
- Rick Perry, longest serving Governor of Texas, (2000–2015) and former U.S. Secretary of Energy (2017–2019).
- Colonel Alfred P.C. Petsch (1925–1941) Lawyer, legislator, civic leader, and philanthropist. Veteran of both World War I and World War II.
- Sam Rayburn, U.S. Representative (1913–1961) and longest served Speaker of the House (1940–1947, 1949–1953, 1955–1961)
- Coke R. Stevenson, Governor of Texas (1941–1947)
- Marc Veasey, U.S. Representative (2013–present)
- Randy Weber, U.S. Representative (2013–present)
- Sarah Weddington, attorney for "Jane Roe" for the 1973 Roe v. Wade case in the U.S. Supreme Court
- Ferdinand C. Weinert, coauthored bill to establish the Pasteur Institute of Texas, authored resolution for humane treatment of state convicts, coauthored the indeterminate sentence and parole law. Also served as Texas Secretary of State
- Charlie Wilson, U.S. Representative (1973–1996), subject of the book and film Charlie Wilson's War

== Officials ==
=== Speaker of the House ===
The Speaker of the House of Representatives has duties as a presiding officer as well as administrative duties. As a presiding officer, the Speaker must enforce, apply, and interpret the rules of the House, call House members to order, lay business in order before the House and receive propositions made by members, refer proposed legislation to a committee, preserve order and decorum, recognize people in the gallery, state and hold votes on questions, vote as a member of the House, decide on all questions to order, appoint the Speaker Pro Tempore and Temporary Chair, adjourn the House in the event of an emergency, postpone reconvening in the event of an emergency, and sign all bills, joint resolutions, and concurrent resolutions. The administrative duties of the Speaker include having control over the Hall of the House, appointing chair, vice-chair, and members to each standing committee, appointing all conference committees, and directing committees to make interim studies.

=== Chief Clerk ===
The Chief Clerk is the head of the Chief Clerk's Office which maintains a record of all authors who sign legislation, maintains and distributes membership information to current house members, and forwards copies of legislation to house committee chairs. The Chief Clerk is the primary custodian of all legal documents within House. Additional duties include keeping a record of all progress on a document, attesting all warrants, writs, and subpoenas, receiving and filing all documents received by the house, and maintaining the electronic information and calendar for documents. When there is a considerable update of the electronic source website, the Chief Clerk is also responsible for noticing House members via email.

== Committee structure ==
The committee structure below is valid for the 88th Legislature (numbers in parentheses are the number of committee members; under House rules 1/2 of each committee's membership is determined by seniority and the remaining 1/2 by the Speaker of the House, excluding Procedural Committees (Note: The following committees are considered Procedural: Calendars, Local & Consent Calendars, Resolutions Calendars, General Investigating, House Administration, and Redistricting.) the membership of which are wholly chosen by the Speaker).

- Agriculture and Livestock (9)
- Appropriations (Note: The biennial appropriations bill is divided into eight Articles: General Government (I), Health and Human Services (II), Agencies of Education (III), The Judiciary (IV), Public Safety and Criminal Justice (V), Natural Resources (VI), Business and Economic Development (VII), and Regulatory (VIII).) (27)
  - Subcommittee on Articles I, IV & V
  - Subcommittee on Article II
  - Subcommittee on Article III
  - Subcommittee on Articles VI, VII & VIII
  - Subcommittee on Strategic Fiscal Review
- Business & Industry (9)
- Calendars (11)
- Community Safety (select)
- Corrections (9)
- County Affairs (9)
- Criminal Jurisprudence (9)
- Culture, Recreation & Tourism (9)
- Defense & Veterans' Affairs (9)
- Elections (9)
- Energy Resources (11)
- Environmental Regulation (9)
- General Investigating (5)
- Health Care Reform (select)
- Higher Education (11)
- Homeland Security & Public Safety (9)
- House Administration (11)
- Human Services (9)
- Insurance (9)
- International Relations & Economic Development (9)
  - As of 2021 the committee examines the Texas Workforce Commission. That year, Christopher Hooks, R.G. Ratcliffe and Andrea Zelinski of Texas Monthly stated that the competencies are "vital" even though there is a lack of prestige in being assigned to this committee, stating that it is "not a sexy assignment" and comparing being placed on it to "getting cast as a tree in your high school play." Some lawmakers are placed on the committee as a means of disciplining them.
- Judiciary & Civil Jurisprudence (9)
- Juvenile Justice & Family Issues (9)
- Land & Resource Management (9)
- Licensing & Administrative Procedures (11)
- Local & Consent Calendars (11)
- Natural Resources (11)
- Pensions, Investments & Financial Services (9)
- Public Education (13)
- Public Health (11)
- Redistricting (15)
- Resolutions Calendars (11)
- State Affairs (13)
- Transportation (13)
- Urban Affairs (9)
- Ways & Means (11)
- Youth Health & Safety (select)

In addition to these committees, there are also six joint committees composed of members of both the State House and Senate:

- Criminal Justice Legislative Oversight
- Legislative Audit Committee (Note: This committees is composed of six members: the Speaker of the House and the Lieutenant Governor (who serve as joint chairs), the Chair of the Senate Finance Committee, the Chairs of the House Appropriations and Ways and Means Committees, and one Senator appointed by the Lieutenant Governor; the Committee in turn hires and oversees the State Auditor of Texas.)
- Legislative Budget Board (Note: This committee is composed of ten members: the Speaker of the House and the Lieutenant Governor (who serve as joint chairs), the Chair of the Senate Finance Committee, the Chairs of the House Appropriations and Ways and Means Committees, three Senators appointed by the Lieutenant Governor, and two Representatives appointed by the Speaker.)
- Legislative Reference Library Board (Note: This committee is composed of six members: the Speaker of the House and the Lieutenant Governor the Chair of the House Appropriations Committee, two Senators appointed by the Lieutenant Governor, and one Representative appointed by the Speaker.)
- Sunset Advisory Commission
- Texas Legislative Council (Note: This committee is composed of 14 members: the Speaker of the House and the Lieutenant Governor (who serve as joint chairs), the Chair of the House Administration Committee, six Senators appointed by the Lieutenant Governor, and five Representatives appointed by the Speaker.)

== See also ==
- Texas Senate
- List of Texas state legislatures
