= Frisco, Texas =

- City
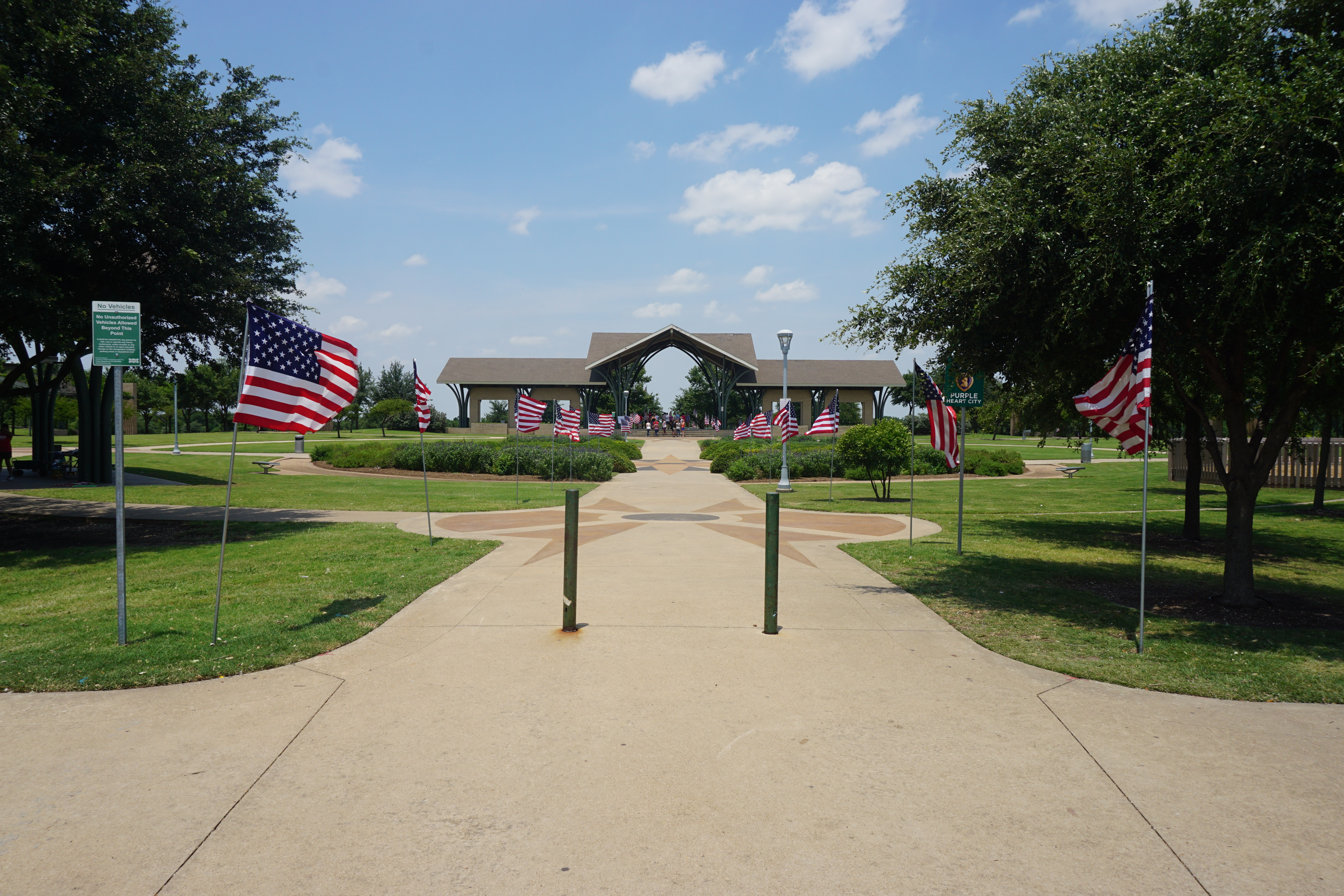
- Frisco Square George A. Purefoy Municipal Center Stonebriar Centre Water Tower Frisco commons Main Street Old Historic Ford Center at The Star National Soccer Hall of Fame

- Flag Logo
- Motto: Progress in Motion
- Interactive map of Frisco, Texas
- Location within Texas Location within the United States
- Coordinates: 33°08′30″N 96°49′18″W
- Country: United States
- State: Texas
- Counties: Collin, Denton
- Established: 1902; 124 years ago

Government
  - Type: Council–manager
  - Mayor: Mark Hill

Area
  - City: 69.19 sq mi (179.21 km^{2})
  - Land: 68.64 sq mi (177.77 km^{2})
  - Water: 0.56 sq mi (1.44 km^{2})
- Elevation: 689 ft (210 m)

Population (2020)
  - City: 200,509
  - Estimate (March 2026): 247,452 ▲
  - Rank: US: 97th TX: 14th
  - Density: 2,921.0/sq mi (1,127.79/km^{2})
  - Urban: 504,803 (US: 83rd)
  - Urban density: 3,329/sq mi (1,285.3/km^{2})
- Time zone: UTC−6 (CST)
  - Summer (DST): UTC−5 (CDT)
- ZIP Codes: 75033–75036
- Area codes: 214, 469, 945, 972
- FIPS code: 48-27684
- GNIS feature ID: 2410549
- Website: www.friscotexas.gov

Frisco is a city in Collin and Denton counties in the U.S. state of Texas. It is part of the Dallas–Fort Worth metroplex (DFW) and about 25 miles (40 km) from both Dallas Love Field and Dallas/Fort Worth International Airport. Its population was 200,509 in the 2020 U.S. census.

Frisco was the fastest-growing city in the United States in 2017, and from 2000 to 2009. In the late 1990s, the northern DFW suburban development tide hit the northern border of Plano and spilled into Frisco, sparking rapid growth into the 2000s. Like many of the cities in Dallas's northern exurbs, Frisco serves as a bedroom community for professionals who work in DFW. Since 2003, Frisco has received the designation Tree City USA from the National Arbor Day Foundation.

The United States Census Bureau defines an urban area of northern Dallas-area suburbs that are separated from the Dallas–Fort Worth urban area, with McKinney and Frisco as the principal cities: the McKinney–Frisco, Texas, urban area had a population of 504,803 as of the 2020 census, ranked 83rd in the United States.

== History ==
When the Dallas area was being settled by American pioneers, many of the settlers traveled by wagon trains along the Shawnee Trail. This trail became the Preston Trail, and later Preston Road. With all this activity, the community of Lebanon was founded along this trail and was granted a U.S. post office in 1860.

In 1902, a line of the St. Louis–San Francisco Railway ("the Frisco") was being built through the area, and periodic watering stops were needed along the route for the steam locomotives. The current settlement of Lebanon was on Preston Ridge and was too high in elevation, so the watering stop was placed about 4 miles (6 km) to the west, on lower ground. A community grew around this train stop, and some Lebanon residents moved their houses to the new community on logs. The new town was originally named Emerson, but the U.S. Postal Service rejected the name as too similar to another community, Emberson, in Lamar County.

In 1904, the town's residents chose "Frisco City" in honor of the St. Louis–San Francisco Railway. This name was later shortened to Frisco.

== Geography ==
Frisco is within the Dallas–Fort Worth metroplex, partially in Denton and Collin counties, in North Texas. According to the United States Census Bureau, the city has an area of 62.4 sq mi (161.6 km^{2}), of which 160.1 km^{2} (61.8 sq mi) is land and 0.58 sq mi (1.5 km^{2}), or 0.92%, is covered by water.

=== Climate ===
Frisco is part of the humid subtropical region. The city gets 39 inches (990 mm) of precipitation per year. On average, 230 days per year are sunny. The July high is 96 °F (36 °C); the January low is 33 °F (1 °C). The comfort index, which is based on humidity during the hot months, is 25 out of 100, where higher is more comfortable. The city is also in Tornado Alley, with the most recent confirmed tornado in 2024, as an EF-0 tornado, near the UNT Frisco Campus.

== Demographics ==
Historical population
Census	Pop.	Note	%±
1910	332		—
1920	733		120.8%
1930	618		−15.7%
1940	670		8.4%
1950	736		9.9%
1960	1,184		60.9%
1970	1,845		55.8%
1980	3,420		85.4%
1990	6,138		79.5%
2000	33,714		449.3%
2010	116,989		247.0%
2020	200,509		71.4%
2025 (est.)	236,955	▲	18.2%
U.S. Decennial Census; 1850–1900 1910; 1920 1930 1940 1950 1960 1970 1980 1990 2000; 2010 2020

As of the 2020 census, there were 200,509 people, 64,151 households, and 48,519 families residing in the city, up from 2010's tabulation of 116,989.

Frisco, Texas – Racial and ethnic composition Note: the U.S. census treats Hispanic/Latino as an ethnic category. This table excludes Latinos from the racial categories and assigns them to a separate category. Hispanics/Latinos may be of any race.
Race / Ethnicity (NH = Non-Hispanic)	Pop 2000	Pop 2010	Pop 2020	% 2000	% 2010	% 2020
White alone (NH)	27,433	78,566	96,248	81.37%	67.16%	48.00%
Black or African American alone (NH)	1,229	9,182	17,683	3.65%	7.85%	8.82%
Native American or Alaska Native alone (NH)	122	453	611	0.36%	0.39%	0.30%
Asian alone (NH)	782	11,568	52,672	2.32%	9.89%	26.27%
Native Hawaiian or Pacific Islander alone (NH)	6	47	110	0.02%	0.04%	0.05%
Other race alone (NH)	34	270	1,049	0.10%	0.23%	0.52%
Mixed race or Multiracial (NH)	392	2,749	9,120	1.16%	2.35%	4.55%
Hispanic or Latino (any race)	3,716	14,154	23,016	11.02%	12.10%	11.48%
Total	33,714	116,989	200,509	100.00%	100.00%	100.00%

=== 2020 census ===
The median age was 37.0 years. 29.6% of residents were under the age of 18 and 9.2% of residents were 65 years of age or older. For every 100 females there were 95.9 males, and for every 100 females age 18 and over there were 92.7 males age 18 and over.

99.9% of residents lived in urban areas, while 0.1% lived in rural areas.

There were 69,025 households in Frisco, of which 47.7% had children under the age of 18 living in them. Of all households, 63.8% were married-couple households, 12.9% were households with a male householder and no spouse or partner present, and 19.5% were households with a female householder and no spouse or partner present. About 19.7% of all households were made up of individuals and 4.9% had someone living alone who was 65 years of age or older.

There were 73,633 housing units, of which 6.3% were vacant. The homeowner vacancy rate was 2.3% and the rental vacancy rate was 9.9%.

Racial composition as of the 2020 census
Race	Number	Percent
White	101,167	50.5%
Black or African American	18,005	9.0%
American Indian and Alaska Native	986	0.5%
Asian	52,833	26.3%
Native Hawaiian and Other Pacific Islander	129	0.1%
Some other race	7,053	3.5%
Two or more races	20,336	10.1%
Hispanic or Latino (of any race)	23,016	11.5%

=== 2010 American Community Survey ===
According to a 2010 American Community Survey estimate, the median income for a household in the city was $100,868, the median income for a family was $109,086. The per capita income for the city was $38,048. About 2.2% of families and 5.8% of the population were below the poverty line, including 7.5% of those under age 18 and 2.4% of those age 65 or over. The median price for a new home was $252,000. By 2019, its median income grew to $116,884.

== Economy ==
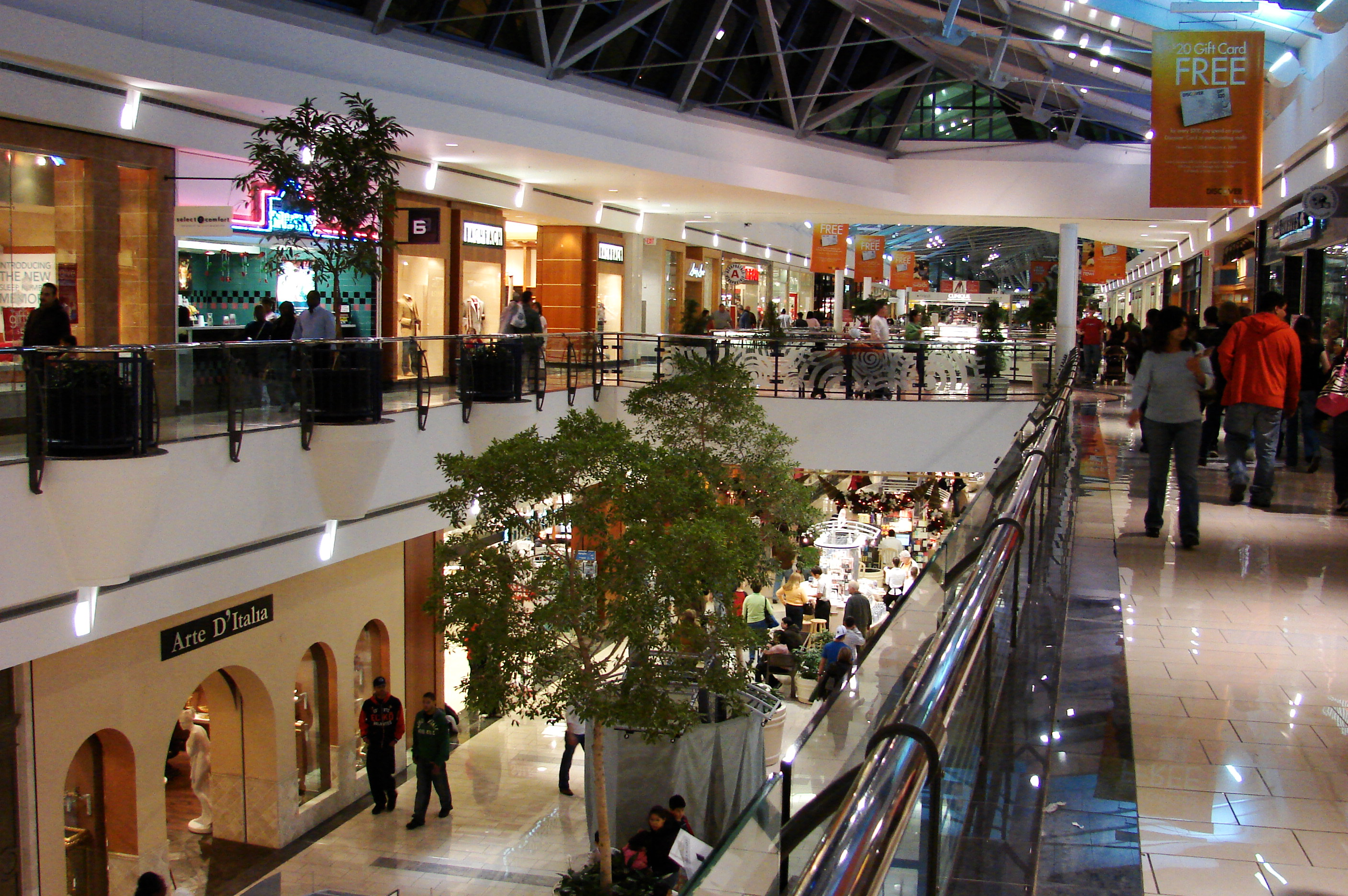
Interior of Stonebriar Centre

Frisco has many retail properties, including Stonebriar Centre, a 165-store regional mall; IKEA, a furniture store with an area of 310,000 sq ft (28,800 m^{2}); and The Star, the headquarters of the Dallas Cowboys. Retail establishments and restaurants line Preston Road, one of the city's major north–south traffic arteries.

Frisco took a different economic track than many surrounding cities, electing to use a fractional percent of local sales tax to fund the Frisco Economic Development Corporation (FEDC) rather than Dallas Area Rapid Transit (DART), the regional transportation body. The effectiveness of the FEDC, whose primary purpose is to reallocate such tax dollars to commercial ventures, is a matter of public debate.

Frisco Square, a mixed-use development, became the new downtown along with the city hall. Frisco Square has about 250 rental residential units, seven restaurants, about 40,000 square feet (3,700 m^{2}) of commercial office space, and a few personal-service locations. The major development in the project is the new city hall, main library, and public commons. A Cinemark theater opened in 2010. In 2012, a hospital, Medical City Plano-Frisco, was built north of the theater.

Gearbox Software is located here.

=== Major employers ===
Frisco's top employers as of 2023 were the following:

No.	Employer	No. of employees
1	Frisco Independent School District	8,799
2	City of Frisco	1,738
3	T-Mobile USA	1,332
4	Keurig Dr Pepper Inc	1,213
5	Teachers Insurance & Annuity Association of America	906
6	Conifer Health Solutions	903
7	Baylor Scott White / Centennial Hospital	663
8	Dallas Cowboy Football Club	471
9	Baylor Medical Center of Frisco	460
10	Lexipol	420

== Arts and culture ==
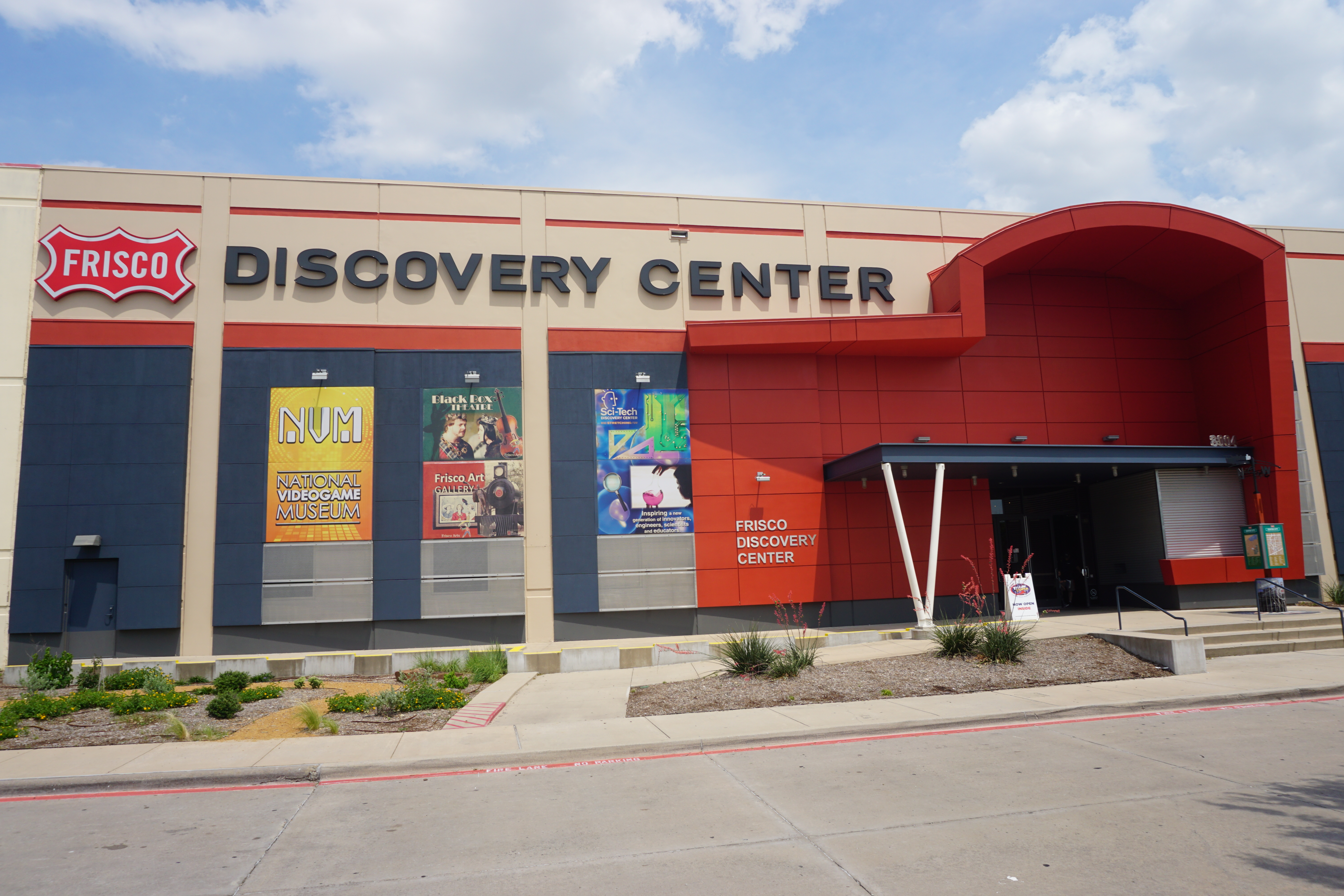
Frisco Discovery Center in June 2019

Frisco hosts the Museum of the American Railroad, which is based in the Frisco Heritage Museum while construction on a separate museum complex continues. The nearby Discovery Center features an art gallery, a black-box theater, and the National Videogame Museum.

Frisco Square hosts a variety of events throughout the year including Arts in the Square, Music in the Square, and the annual Christmas in the Square holiday light show (the largest choreographed lights and music show in North Texas). The city hall also hosts a Music in the Chamber concert series in the city council chamber.

=== Library ===
Frisco Public Library was housed in City Hall until March 2023, when the new library opened in a converted warehouse building. The new library is the sixth-largest in Texas and hosts a full-size Tyrannosaurus skeleton named Rexy.

== Sports ==
Frisco is home to several sporting venues, many major sports teams headquarters, and an NCAA Division I conference headquarters. In April 2011, Men's Journal named Frisco the Best Place to Raise an Athlete.

=== Venues ===
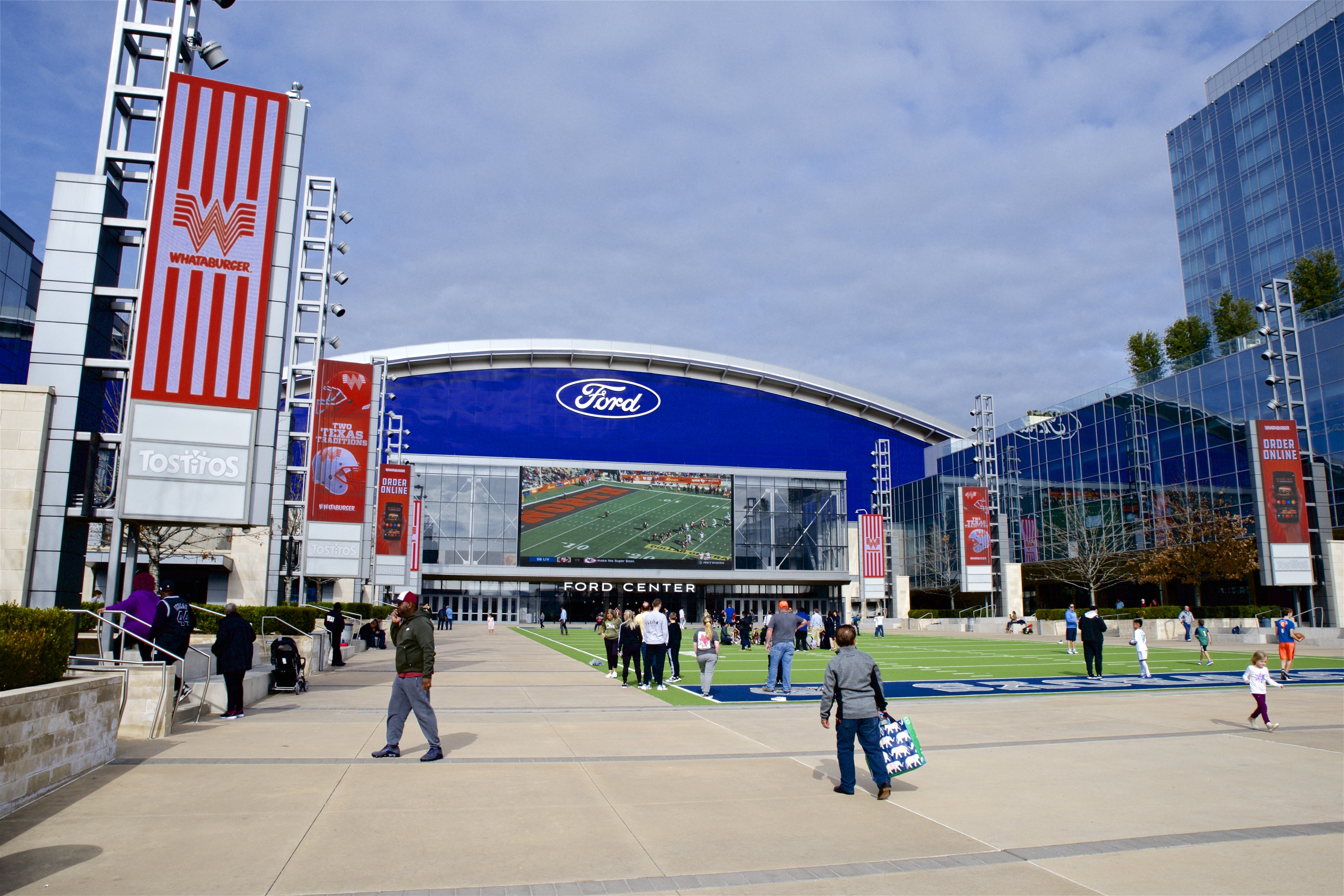
Ford Center at the Star, the Dallas Cowboys' practice facility which has also been home to Frisco ISD football games, the Texas Revolution, and the Dallas Rattlers

The Ford Center at the Star is a 12,000-seat indoor stadium. The 91-acre Dallas Cowboys project "The Star" includes the team's headquarters and training facilities, including the Ford Center, where the Cowboys practice and Frisco ISD high school teams practice and play on a rotating basis. It is on Gaylord Parkway, one block west of the Dallas North Tollway. Multiple professional teams have made their home at the Ford Center, including the Texas Revolution of Champions Indoor Football and the Dallas Rattlers of Major League Lacrosse. The PGA of America headquarters in Frisco, Texas, is part of a mixed-use development that includes championship golf courses and the Omni PGA Frisco Resort.

Riders Field, a 10,316-seat baseball stadium, hosted its first baseball game on April 3, 2003. BaseballParks.com named it the best new ballpark that year, and it received the 2003 Texas Construction award for Best Architectural Design.

Toyota Stadium, which opened in 2005 as "Pizza Hut Park", is a 20,500-seat stadium. It is primarily used as a soccer stadium by FC Dallas, but also hosts concerts and high school and college football games, including the NCAA Division I-AA (FCS) college football championship starting in 2010 and the NCAA Division I (FBS) Frisco Bowl starting in 2017. The stadium is also home to the Dallas Renegades of the UFL.

The Comerica Center (formerly Dr Pepper Arena), a combination hockey and basketball venue, is the home of the Texas Legends of the NBA G League and the Frisco Fighters of the Indoor Football League, and a practice facility for the Dallas Stars of the NHL.

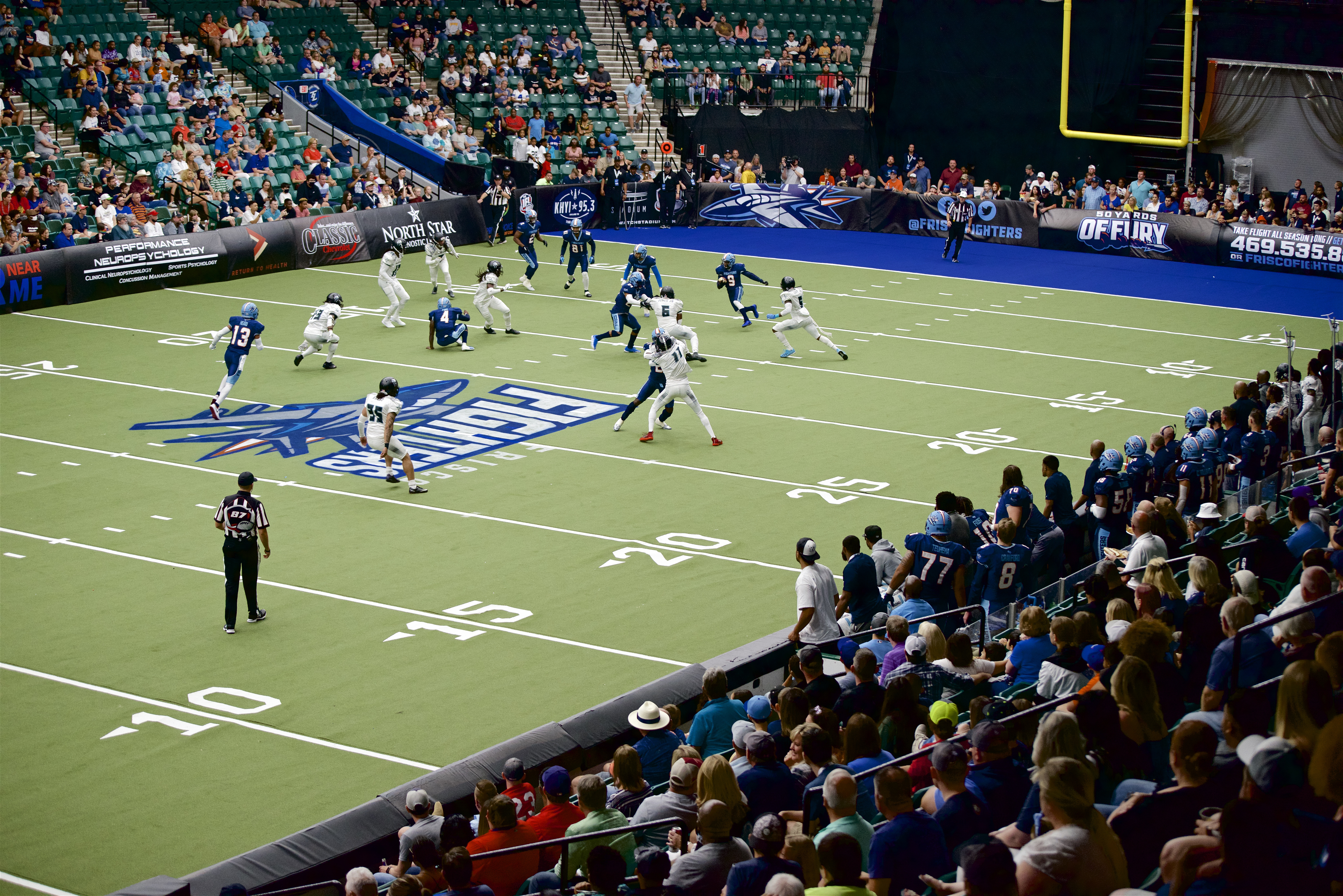
The inaugural home opener of the Frisco Fighters at the Comerica Center

The Dallas Cowboys of the National Football League (NFL) moved their corporate headquarters to "The Star" in Frisco in time for the 2016 NFL football season; the complex opened in June 2016. Built-in partnership with Frisco ISD, which contributed $30 million to build the Ford Center at the Star in lieu of a dedicated third football stadium, Frisco ISD has held high school football games at the Ford Center since it opened.

Multiple professional indoor football teams have previously been based in Frisco, including the Frisco Thunder of the Intense Football League and the Texas Revolution of Champions Indoor Football.

In 2020 a new Indoor Football League expansion franchise, the Frisco Fighters, debuted with home games to be played at Comerica Center. After the Fighters' 2020 season was canceled due to the COVID-19 pandemic, the team played its inaugural home opener on June 5, 2021. In their first year of operation, the Fighters clinched a playoff berth, advancing as far as the IFL semifinal game against the eventual 2021 United Bowl champion Massachusetts Pirates.

The Dallas Stars National Hockey League team is headquartered in Frisco, and practices at the Comerica Center. The Texas Tornado of the North American Hockey League had been based in Frisco since the fall of 2003, and shortly afterward the league moved its main offices to Frisco. In the 2013 off-season, the Texas Tornado relocated to North Richland Hills, Texas. The league relocated its offices in 2018.

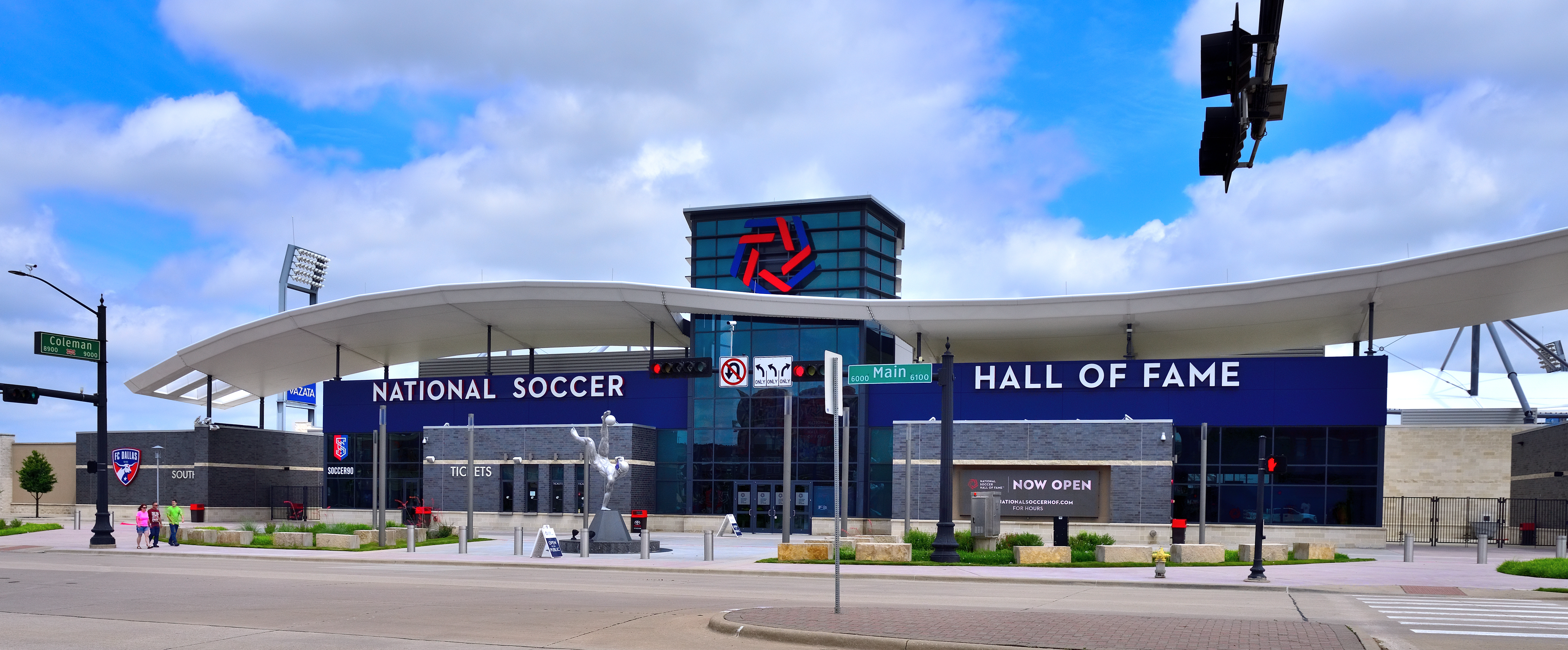
National Soccer Hall of Fame

FC Dallas (formerly the Dallas Burn), a Major League Soccer team, moved its home to Pizza Hut Park (now Toyota Stadium) near the corner of the Dallas North Tollway and Main Street in August 2005. A major international youth soccer tournament, the Dallas Cup, is hosted in Frisco each year and draws teams from around the world. The National Soccer Hall of Fame is co-located with Toyota Stadium.

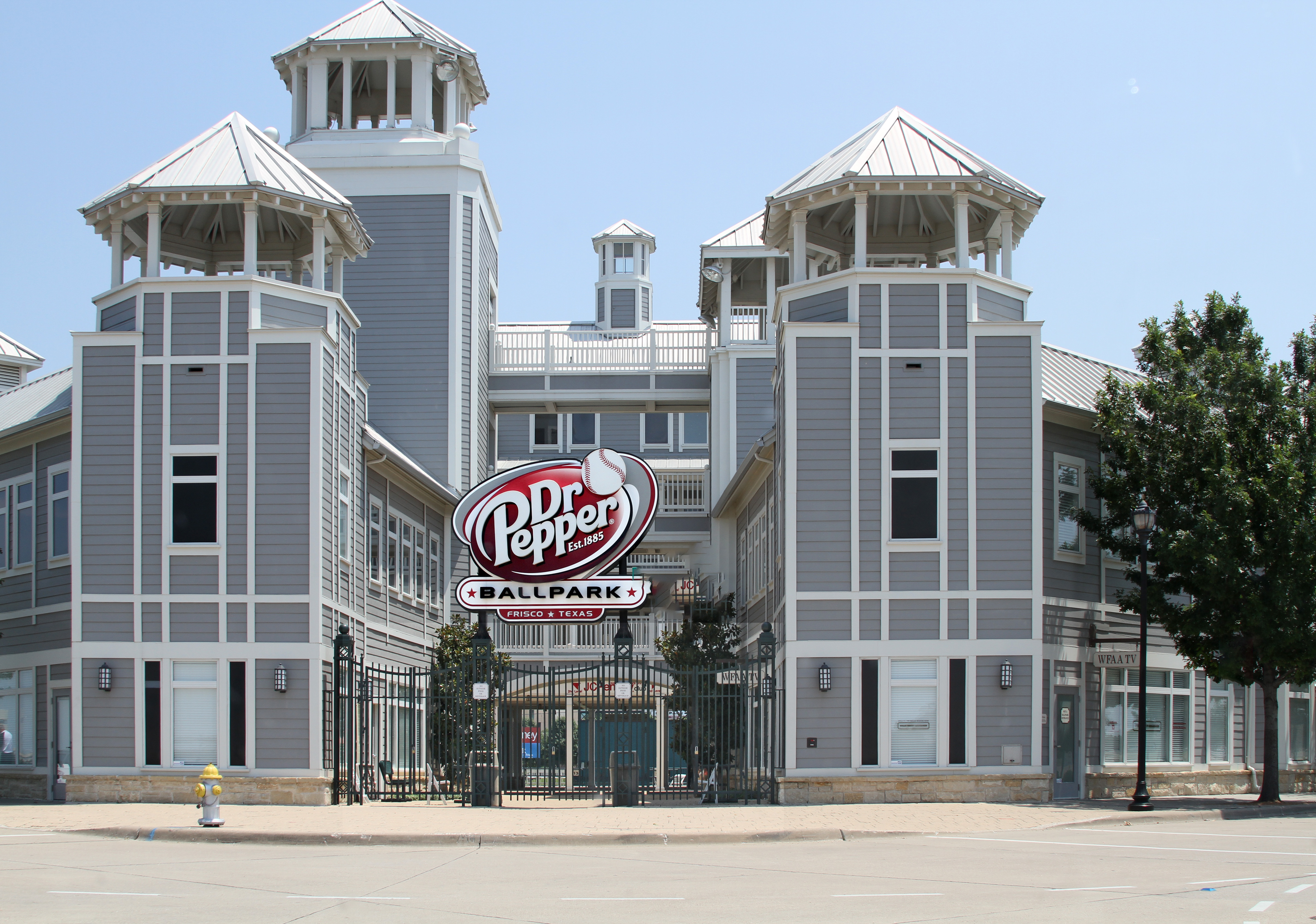
The main entrance of Riders Field

The Frisco RoughRiders, the Double-A Minor League Baseball affiliate of the Texas Rangers in the South Division of the Texas League, play in Frisco at Riders Field.

The Texas Legends, affiliated with the Dallas Mavericks, are members of the NBA G League and play at Comerica Center.

On November 16, 2017, Major League Lacrosse announced it would be moving the Rochester Rattlers franchise to The Ford Center at the Star in Frisco for the 2018 season as the Dallas Rattlers. The Rattlers folded after the 2019 season.

The Southland Conference, an NCAA Division I athletics organization, relocated its headquarters to Frisco in 2006. On February 26, 2010, Pizza Hut Park (now Toyota Stadium) was announced as the host of the Football Championship Subdivision (formerly NCAA Division I-AA) championship game, formerly held in Chattanooga, Tennessee, and Huntington, West Virginia. The first matchup, hosted by the Southland Conference, was played January 7, 2011.

=== Others ===
Frisco also has an Olympic-sized, state-of-the-art natatorium. The Frisco Baseball and Softball Association was established in 1984. The Frisco Football League is an organized recreational league that allows children to play football before entering football in the school district. The Flagfootball4fun Flag Football League (FF4FUN) is an organized recreational youth flag football league. The sports entertainment group Dude Perfect is based in Frisco.

== Parks and recreation ==
The Frisco Athletic Center features 18,000 square feet (1,700 m^{2}) of indoor aquatics elements and about 40,000 square feet (3,700 m^{2}) of outdoor aquatic features. It features exercise equipment, basketball courts, and group exercise classes.

On January 11, 2023, Universal Destinations & Experiences announced a "new concept"-styled theme park to be constructed in Frisco called Universal Kids Resort, which opened on July 1, 2026.

== Government ==
=== Local government ===
Frisco is a "home rule" city. Frisco voters adopted its initial "home rule" charter in 1987. Frisco residents have voted to amend the charter three times since 1987:

- May 2002, approved 19 propositions
- May 2010, approved 14 propositions
- May 2019, approved 24 propositions

In May 2014, the Charter Review Commission recommended an additional 14 propositions, but these were never placed on the ballots.

Frisco has a council-manager government, which consists of a mayor, six city council members elected at-large, and a city manager. Council members' duties include enacting local legislation (ordinances), adopting budgets, determining policies, and appointing the city manager. The mayor and city council members each serve three year terms, with term limits of three terms. There have been only two city managers in Frisco history: George Purefoy, who served for over 34 years until his retirement in 2022, and his successor, Wes Pierson.

According to the city's 2010 Comprehensive Annual Financial Report, the city's various funds had $227.2 million in revenue, $184.4 million in expenditures, $1.647 billion in total assets, $753.1 million in total liabilities, and $159.3 million in cash and investments.

The city of Frisco is a voluntary member of the North Central Texas Council of Governments, the purpose of which is to coordinate individual and collective local governments and facilitate regional solutions, eliminate unnecessary duplication, and enable joint decisions.

=== Mayors ===
Mayor	Start Year	End Year	Notes
Dr. I. S. Rogers	1908	1911	First elected mayor of city
E. D. Baccus	1911	1912	
F. P. Shrader	1912	1916	
E. D. Baccus	1916	1917	Previously served as mayor 1911–1912
F. P. Shrader	1917	1920	Previously served as mayor 1912–1916
Gus Stacy	1920	1921	Unclear why seat was vacated
R. W. Carpenter	1921	1922	
F. P. Shrader	1922	1926	Previously served as mayor 1912–1916 and 1917–1920
F. H. Anderson	1926	1927	
F. P. Shrader	1927	1930	Previously served as mayor 1912–1916, 1917–1920, and 1922–1926
W. H. Clark	1930	1934	
Dr. J. M. Ogle	1934	1938	
J. F. Biggerstaff	1938	1944	
William Watson	1944	1946	
Sam Lane	1946	1948	
R. K. Hollas	1948	1954	
B. A. Staley	1954	1960	
J. C. Grant	1960	1966	
H. P. Bacchus	1966	1978	
John Clanton	1978	1986	
Randy Elliot	1986	1990	Resigned
Bob Warren	1990	1996	
Kathy Seei	1996	2002	
Mike Simpson	2002	2008	
Maher Maso	2008	2017	
Jeff Cheney	2017	2026	
Mark Hill	2026	-	Incumbent Mayor

=== State government ===
After the 2021 state and federal redistricting, Frisco contains most or parts of Texas State House of Representatives districts 57, 61, 66 and 106. Frisco contains parts of Texas State Senate districts 8 and 30.

=== Federal government ===
After the 2021 state and federal redistricting, Frisco contains parts of United States Congressional districts 3, 4, and 26.

After the 2025 mid-decade redistricting in Texas, Frisco contains parts of United States Congressional District 4.

=== Politics ===
Frisco city vote by party in gubernatorial elections
Year	Democratic	Republican	Third Parties
2022	45.86% 30,424	53.07% 35,206	1.07% 712

== Education ==
=== Primary and secondary ===
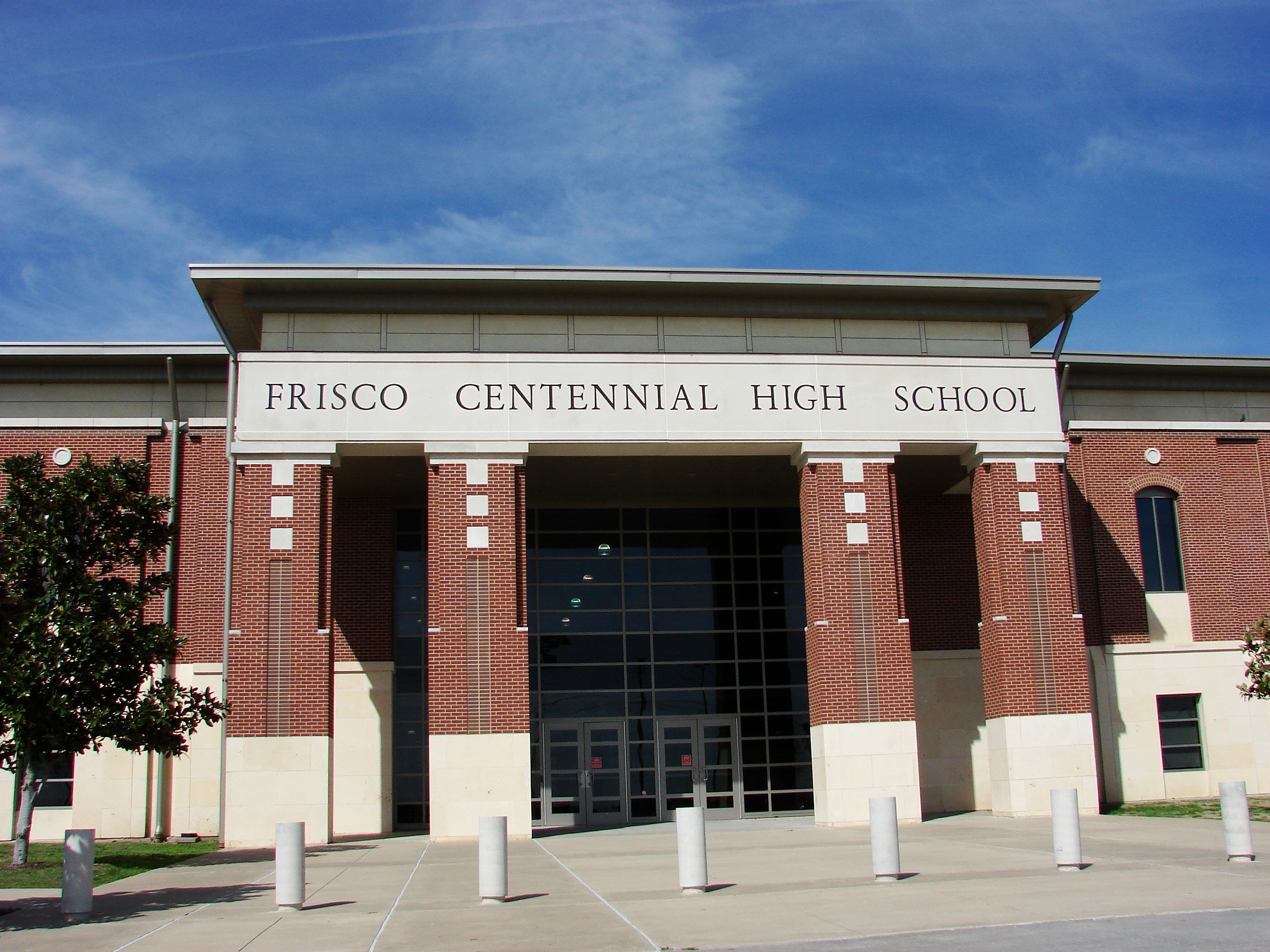
Centennial High School

Most of Frisco is in the Frisco Independent School District (Frisco ISD), with some parts of the city extending into the Lewisville Independent School District, Little Elm Independent School District, and Prosper Independent School District. Lewisville ISD operates one elementary campus in the city while Prosper ISD operates an elementary school, a middle school, and Rock Hill High School, a high school within the Frisco city limits.

Frisco ISD has 12 high schools 18 middle schools and 43 elementary schools, and 3 special programs centers. Most Frisco ISD schools are within the Frisco city limits, but some are in adjacent suburbs, such as Plano. All Frisco high schools compete in UIL Class 5A, with the exception of Panther Creek High School, which competes in Class 4A.

The Frisco ISD Early Childhood School is available for children ages three and four who meet eligibility requirements for Headstart, Prekindergarten, or Preschool Program for Children with Disabilities.

At the Frisco ISD Career and Technical Education Center, high school students can experience and try different careers, from veterinary work to advertising and graphic design.

=== Higher education ===
The Texas Legislature designated Collin College as the community college for the municipality of Frisco as well as all of Collin County. The Preston Ridge campus of the community college district opened on Wade Boulevard in Frisco in 1995. Amberton University has a local campus on Parkwood Boulevard north of Warren Parkway. In 2008, Frisco ISD opened the Career and Technology Education Center.

The University of Dallas moved its Carrollton campus to Frisco. UT Arlington has a professional MBA campus in Frisco. The University of North Texas core MBA courses can be taken at the Frisco campus.

== Infrastructure ==
=== Major highways ===
- Dallas North Tollway (Service Road is Dallas Parkway)
- Sam Rayburn Tollway (Service Road is SH 121)
- SH 289 (Preston Road)
- US 380 (University Drive)
- FM 423 (U.S. Army Sergeant Enrique Mondragon Memorial Highway)

=== Public Transportation ===
Frisco is served by the Denton County Transportation Authority (DCTA) through its GoZone service. GoZone is a Microtransit service that offers on-demand rides throughout Frisco and to the Northwest Plano Park & Ride.

== Notable people ==
- Jay Ajayi, former National Football League running back for the Miami Dolphins and Philadelphia Eagles
- Jack Anderson, professional American football player for the Philadelphia Eagles
- Marion Barber III, former National Football League running back for the Dallas Cowboys and Chicago Bears
- Ben Bishop, professional ice hockey goaltender for the Dallas Stars
- Nick Bolton, professional football player for the Kansas City Chiefs
- Anika Chebrolu, child prodigy in the field of medical science
- Bobby Crues, American baseball player
- Dawson Deaton, professional American football player for the Cleveland Browns
- King Diamond, Danish heavy metal musician and vocalist of Mercyful Fate
- Dude Perfect, popular influencers on YouTube
- Pat Fallon, member of the United States House of Representatives for Congressional District 4 (2021–present)
- Elliott Fry, professional football player, currently a free agent
- Courtney Gibbs, Miss Texas USA 1988 and Miss USA 1988
- Maelyn Jarmon, winner of the 16th season of The Voice
- Lamar Jordan, former professional football player for the Atlanta Falcons
- Cheyenne Kimball, a former Gloriana band member
- Matt Lepsis, former National Football League player for the Denver Broncos and Super Bowl XXXIII winner
- Kene Nwangwu, professional football player for the New York Jets
- Ryan O’Hearn, professional baseball player for The Baltimore Orioles
- Jared Patterson, member of the Texas State House of Representatives for District 106 (2018–present)
- Red Patterson, former professional baseball player for the Los Angeles Dodgers
- Jaedyn Shaw, soccer player
- Taryn Torres, soccer player

== In popular culture ==
In 1978, the first season of Dallas was filmed at Frisco's Cloyce Box Ranch (now the Brinkmann Ranch), where the house on site was used as the Ewing family home. This house burned down during renovations in 1987, and the steel skeleton of the house still stands on today's Brinkmann Ranch, now the largest family-owned estate in Frisco.

A spinoff of the show Tulsa King, titled Frisco King, was confirmed in February 2026. It was originally titled NOLA King and set in New Orleans. The show, set in Frisco, stars Samuel L. Jackson and Sylvester Stallone. It began filming at nearby locations in April 2026.
