= Craig Estes =

American politician

Member of the Texas Senate from the 30th district
- In office 2001 – January 2019
- Preceded by: Tom Haywood
- Succeeded by: Pat Fallon

Personal details
- Born: August 20, 1953 (age 73) Wichita Falls, Texas, U.S.
- Party: Republican
- Spouse: Jennifer Estes
- Education: Oral Roberts University
- Occupation: Businessman

Craig Linton Estes (born August 20, 1953) is an American businessman and former Republican member of the Texas Senate for the 30th District. He served on the Health and Human Services, Nominations, and State Affairs Committees, and was the chairman of the Natural Resources & Economic Development Committee. He also served as the President Pro Tempore of the Texas Senate for the 83rd interim session.

Estes was defeated by challenger Pat Fallon in the Republican primary election held on March 6, 2018.

== Electoral history ==
Senate election history of Estes.

=== 2012 ===
Texas general election, 2012: Senate District 30.
Party	Candidate	Votes	%	±%
Republican	Craig L. Estes (Incumbent)	217,877	86.12	−13.88
Libertarian	Richard Wells Forsythe Jr.	35,127	13.88	+13.88
Majority		182,750	72.24	+27.76
Turnout		253,004		+14.24
Republican hold				

Republican primary, 2012: Senate District 30
Candidate		Votes	%	±
✓	Craig L. Estes (Incumbent)	44,464	65.27	
	Jim Herblin	22,599	34.73	
Majority		21,865	30.54	
Turnout		65,063		

=== 2008 ===
Texas general election, 2008: Senate District 30.
Party	Candidate	Votes	%	±%
Republican	Craig L. Estes (Incumbent)	221,470	100.00	+30.95
Majority		221,470	100.00	+61.91
Turnout		221,470		−16.01
Republican hold				

Republican primary, 2008: Senate District 30
Candidate		Votes	%	±
✓	Craig L. Estes (Incumbent)	44,106	70.07	
	Charles R. Stafford	18,838	29.93	
Majority		25,268	40.14	
Turnout		62,944		

=== 2004 ===
Texas general election, 2004: Senate District 30. He was the chairman of the Senate Agriculture Committee.
Party	Candidate	Votes	%	±%
Republican	Craig L. Estes (Incumbent)	182,057	69.05	+1.49
Democratic	Paul S. Gibbs	81,614	30.95	+1.18
Majority		100,443	38.09	+0.31
Turnout		263,671		+63.16
Republican hold				

=== 2002 ===
Texas general election, 2002: Senate District 30.
Party	Candidate	Votes	%	±%
Republican	Craig L. Estes (Incumbent)	109,164	67.55	+4.91
Democratic	Donald L. Acheson	48,110	29.77	−7.58
Libertarian	Diane Wilson	4,321	2.67	+2.67
Majority		61,057	37.78	+12.49
Turnout				
Republican hold				

Republican primary, 2002: Senate District 30
Candidate		Votes	%	±
	Dave Deison	11,508	42.30	
✓	Craig L. Estes (Incumbent)	15,698	57.70	
Majority		4,190	15.40	
Turnout				

=== 2001 ===
Special Election Runoff: Senate District 30, Unexpired Term 4 December 2001
Party	Candidate	Votes	%	±%
Republican	Craig Estes	15,332	62.70	'"`UNIQ−−ref−0000004C−QINU`"'+15.49
Democratic	Greg L. Underwood	9,120	37.30	+14.38
Majority		6,212	25.40	
Turnout		24,452		
Republican hold				

Special Election: Senate District 30, Unexpired Term 6 November 2001
Party	Candidate	Votes	%	±%
Independent	Rick Bunch	520	1.46	
Republican	Craig Estes	16,870	47.21	
Republican	Doug Jeffrey	1,139	3.19	
Republican	Harry Reynolds	2,908	8.14	
Democratic	Greg L. Underwood	8,189	22.92	
Republican	Kirk Wilson	6,105	17.09	
Turnout		35,731		

Assembly seats
Preceded by Tom Haywood	Texas State Senator for the 30th district (Wichita Falls); 2001-2019	Succeeded by Pat Fallon
