= Drew Springer =

American politician (born 1966)

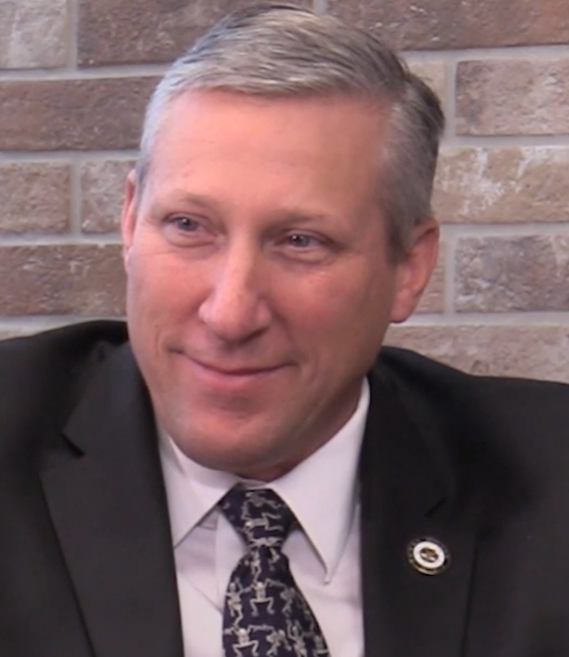

Member of the Texas Senate from the 30th district
- In office January 6, 2021 – January 14, 2025
- Preceded by: Pat Fallon
- Succeeded by: Brent Hagenbuch

Member of the Texas House of Representatives from the 68th district
- In office January 8, 2013 – January 6, 2021
- Preceded by: Rick Hardcastle
- Succeeded by: David Spiller

Personal details
- Born: Drew Alan Springer Jr. October 27, 1966 (age 60)
- Party: Republican
- Education: University of North Texas (BS)
- Occupation: Financial Services

Drew Alan Springer Jr. (born October 27, 1966) is an American businessman and politician who represented District 30 in the Texas Senate as a Republican from 2021 until 2025.

Springer announced on November 7, 2023 that he would not seek re-election in 2024 and would spend more time focused on managing the family money management firm.

== Education ==
Springer graduated from Weatherford High School in 1985. He then earned a bachelor of science degree in accounting from the University of North Texas.

== Career ==
A businessman, Springer is a former controller of a railcar company. He then was a manager of three companies with a total of more than 1,000 employees. In 2005, he joined his father in business in the financial services industry.

Springer was first elected in 2012, when the incumbent Republican, Rick Hardcastle of Vernon, stepped down after 14 years in office because of multiple sclerosis. Springer was appointed to the Agriculture and Livestock and the Land and Resource Management committees.

Initially, Springer appeared to have lost the 2012 Republican primary election in a heavily rural district, when his chief opponent, Trent McKnight, finished with 49% of the vote, but in the runoff election on July 31, with backing from two eliminated candidates in the primary, Springer topped McKnight, 8,434 (56.4%) to 6,521 (43.6%). Springer was unopposed in the 2012 general election in his heavily Republican district.

Springer noted that McKnight is a former Democrat who had never voted in a Republican primary election until his own race in 2012. The winner in 18 of the 22 counties, McKnight blamed his loss on a high turnout in Cooke County, which also had a competitive election for sheriff, and low participation in the counties in which McKnight led in the primary, despite the high-profile U.S. Senate primary between David Dewhurst and Ted Cruz. In addition to Cooke, Springer won in neighboring Montague, as well as Garza and Floyd Counties.

Springer represented the 68th district of the Texas House of Representatives from 2013 to 2021. The district, the second-largest in the state in area, includes 22 counties.

In 2013, Springer joined the large Republican majority in the Texas House in enacting H.B. 2 to restrict abortion. Springer co-sponsored the legislation. The legislation was subsequently struck down by the U.S. Supreme Court in Whole Woman's Health v. Hellerstedt.

== Personal life ==
His wife Lydia and he, who married in 1991, have three children. They reside in Muenster, Texas.

Texas Senate
Preceded by Pat Fallon	Member of the Texas Senate from the 30th district 2021–2025	Succeeded by Brent Hagenbuch
Texas House of Representatives
Preceded by Rick Hardcastle	Member of the Texas House of Representatives from the 68th district 2013–2021	Succeeded by David Spiller
