= Preston Trail =

Preston Trail, later known as the Old Preston Road, was a road created by the Republic of Texas in 1841 from Preston, Texas on the Red River south to Austin, Texas. This road closely followed an existing trail that led across the area that had been used for centuries. This road was a main transportation artery from Central Texas to North Texas in the latter half of the 19th century. Today, Texas State Highway 289 follows near this former road.

== History ==
=== Ancient trail ===
The Preston Trail followed an ancient Indian trail extending from Mexico through central Texas to what is now St. Louis, Missouri and even on to Ohio where the Shawnee Indians lived. Parts of this old trail became known as the Chihuahua Trail. Extending northwards from Cedar Springs to the Red River, the Old Preston Road crossed very few streams. It followed a geographic spine of topography that still exists today where rainwater draining to the west flows into the Elm Fork of the Trinity River and rainwater draining to the east flows into the East Fork of the Trinity River until the rivers merge downstream of Dallas.

=== Texas Road ===
The route of the Preston Trail followed the earlier cattle trail that came to be known as the Texas Road (also known as the Shawnee Trail). The Texas Road was in use in the early 1840s.

=== Military road ===
Preston Trail became part of the first official Texas military road in 1839. In the autumn that year, Albert Sidney Johnston (who was at that time the Secretary of War for the Republic of Texas) sent soldiers under the command of Colonel William Gordon Cooke to build a road from the Brazos River to the Red River and establish frontier forts to protect settlers from Indian attacks.

In 1840, 23-year-old William Gilwater Preston was the commanding officer of a unit of Republic of Texas soldiers stationed at the newly founded Fort Preston near Preston, Texas, on the Red River. These soldiers were responsible for building a road from Preston to Austin, Texas. The road was surveyed in 1840.

The Preston Trail extended from its southern terminus in Austin northwards to Cedar Springs (now part of downtown Dallas). From that point, it was known as Preston Road. Preston Road extended about 100 miles (160 km) further northwards from the Trinity River at Dallas through Dallas, Collin and Grayson Counties to the town of Preston, where it joined Texas Road. Texas Road then crossed the Red River as it headed north toward Missouri.

According to Gary and Margaret Kraisinger, " Completed in 1843, the Preston road ended just below the confluence of the Washita River and the Red River at Washita Bend."

== Texas State Highway 289 ==
Today, Texas State Highway 289, also known as the modern Preston Road, closely follows the path of the original Preston Trail.

== Modern influence ==
Preston Road is a major commercial roadway that stretches from Dallas north through the suburbs of Plano, Frisco, Prosper, and Celina. The road is named after and follows the general route of the original trail. Statues installed along the road in Frisco depict the Native Americans, cattle drivers, and settlers who used the trail.

The Preston Ridge Campus of Collin College in Frisco is named after the ridge and has been built near the original trail/ridge.

The Centre at Preston Ridge is a major shopping center in Frisco adjacent to Preston Road and the ridge. It contains statues representing a cattle drive on the trail and includes obelisks with historical information about the trail.

Preston Trail Community Church on Independence Parkway in Frisco is also named after the trail (its first location on Main Street was close to the trail).
