= Hatsboro, Oklahoma =

Ghost town in Oklahoma, US

Hatsboro
- Ghost town
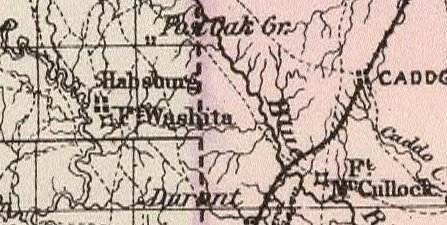
- Fort Washita and Hatsburg (Hatsboro) in Indian Territory
- Interactive map of Hatsboro
- Coordinates: 34.1033°N 96.5516°W
- Country: United States
- State: Oklahoma
- County: Bryan
- Time zone: UTC-6 (Central (CST))
  - Summer (DST): UTC-5 (CDT)

Hatsboro is a ghost town in Bryan County, Oklahoma located near Fort Washita. The town was also known as Rugglesville. The town was located across a creek west of the fort near the Chickasaw Indian Agency; the town's inhabitants were the families of soldiers and fort employees. The town, which was located in Chickasaw Nation, was sizable enough to be given a post office in the 1850s. After the U.S. Army abandoned the fort, the town also was abandoned. By 1929, the town site was being used as farmland, and by 1943, the United States Department of the Interior reported that "a few ruins" were all that was left of the town.
