= Percy Fairall =

Australia international rugby league player

- Percy Fairall

Personal information
- Full name: Percy Christian Charles Fairall
- Born: 5 October 1909; Brisbane, Queensland, Australia
- Died: 11 August 1980 (aged 70); Surry Hills, New South Wales, Australia

Playing information
- Position: Hooker, Second-row, Lock
Club
Years	Team	Pld	T	G	FG	P
1928–37	St. George	90	21	9	0	81
1938–40	South Sydney	35	5	6	0	27
	Total	125	26	15	0	108
Representative
Years	Team	Pld	T	G	FG	P
1935–36	New South Wales	7	2	0	0	6
1935–38	Australia	5	2	0	0	6
1934–37	NSW City	5	1	0	0	3
- Relatives: Tom Hayward (brother-in-law)

Percy Christian Charles Fairall (1909-1980) was an Australian rugby league footballer who played in the 1920s and 1930s. He was a state and national forward who captained his Sydney club side, St George.

== Career ==
Fairall front 2nd from right in Saints' 1930 side

Percy Fairall played nine seasons for the St George Dragons between 1928 and 1937, being club captain between 1935 and 1937. A talented lock-forward and hooker, Percy Fairall was a local St. George junior from the Ramsgate Club, who went on to represent his state and country. He is also remembered as the first St. George player to play 150 grade games for the club.

Fairall represented New South Wales on six occasions between 1935 and 1937. He made his international debut for Australia against New Zealand in 1935, played against the touring English team in 1936 and toured with the Australian team on the 1937–38 Kangaroo Tour. He is listed on the Australian Players Register as Kangaroo No. 192. In 1938 he moved to Surry Hills, New South Wales and represented the South Sydney Rabbitohs for three seasons between 1938 and 1940.

Fairall played in three Grand finals or premiership deciders during his long career, all in losing teams: firstly with St. George in 1930 and 1933 and then with South Sydney in 1939.

Fairall died on 11 August 1980, aged 70.
