= David Spiller (politician) =

Texas legislator

Member of the Texas House of Representatives from the 68th district
- Incumbent
- Assumed office March 9, 2021
- Preceded by: Drew Springer

Personal details
- Born: David Lee Spiller; February 4, 1961 (age 65) Jacksboro, Texas, U.S.
- Party: Republican
- Spouse: Ginger
- Children: 2
- Education: University of Texas at Austin (BBA); St. Mary's University(JD)
- Website: Campaign website

David Lee Spiller (born February 4, 1961) is an American attorney and politician serving as a member of the Texas House of Representatives from the 68th district. He was elected in a 2021 special election.

== Early life and education ==
Spiller was born and raised in Jacksboro, Texas, where he graduated from Jacksboro High School. He earned a Bachelor of Business Administration from the University of Texas at Austin and a Juris Doctor from St. Mary's University School of Law.

== Career ==
Since graduating from law school, Spiller has owned and operated Spiller & Spiller with his brother and two sons. Spiller has also served as Jacksboro City Attorney and general counsel for the Jack County, Texas Hospital District. Spiller also owns the Spiller Oil & Gas Company and Spiller Bonding Company. He was elected to the Texas House of Representatives in a 2021 special election to replace Drew Springer.

Texas House of Representatives
Preceded by Drew Springer	Member of the Texas House of Representatives from the 68th district 2021–present	Incumbent
