= Preston, Texas =

- Census-designated place
- Nickname: Preston Bend
- Location within Texas Location within the United States
- Coordinates: 33°52′50″N 96°38′43″W
- Country: United States
- State: Texas
- County: Grayson
- Settled: 1836

Area
  - Total: 8.1 sq mi (21.1 km^{2})
  - Land: 5.1 sq mi (13.1 km^{2})
  - Water: 3.1 sq mi (8.0 km^{2})
- Elevation: 676 ft (206 m)

Population (2010)
  - Total: 2,096
  - Density: 416/sq mi (160.6/km^{2})
- Time zone: UTC-6 (CST)
- FIPS code: 48-59420
- GNIS feature ID: 2586975

Preston, also known as Preston Bend, is an unincorporated community and census-designated place located on the Red River in Grayson County, Texas, United States. It grew in the 19th century at the intersection of several military and trade roads and was an important crossing on the Shawnee cattle trail. Preston lost prominence after the MK&T railroad bypassed the town to the east, leading to a decline in traveler and cattle drive traffic. Much of its former town site is submerged beneath the waters of Lake Texoma. As of the 2020 census, Preston had a population of 2,101.

== History ==
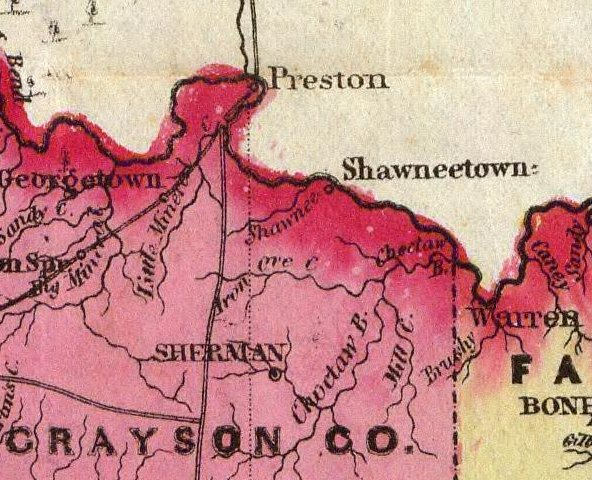
Preston in 1856

=== Early settlement ===
Before European settlement, the general area of Preston had been occupied by the Caddo people, with the Comanche and Kiowa farther to the west. One of the first American settlers in the area was John Hart, who cultivated land at the bend in the Red River possibly before 1826. He left the area just after 1830 after being attacked by Indians during a trapping expedition on the Washita River.

During the 1830s, the United States relocated the Five Civilized Tribes from the Southeastern United States to the Indian Territory, on the north side of the Red River. As the first official United States expedition to the area, the Dodge-Leavenworth Expedition explored the region in 1834. Above Preston on the Red River Leavenworth Camp, situated just west of the mouth of the Washita River, the area was a base for this expedition. George Catlin made some of his famous Indian paintings from this camp.

In the fall of 1838, John Hart returned to the Washita Bend area with two partners. They cleared and fenced 17 acres (69,000 m^{2}) and built three cabins. In 1838, the partnership dissolved and Hart took sole possession of the land. He leased the land to a tenant.

=== Holland Coffee and the trading post ===
Holland Coffee and Silas Cheek Colville created Coffee, Colville, and Company to establish a trading post on the Red River. After establishing three trading posts upstream, they established one in the Washita Bend. They occupied the area of Washita Bend after John Hart's tenant was killed by Indians. Hart later sued Coffee for the land, but lost. In 1837, Holland Coffee had been elected to the Texas Legislature and negotiated a peace treaty between the Republic of Texas and the Waco, Tawakoni, Kichai, and Towash (Pawnee) peoples on September 2, 1838, at a Shawnee village near the mouth of the Washita River.

The town of Preston grew up around the trading post established by Coffee and Colville.

The Trading Post of Holland Coffee site received a historic marker in 1936.

=== Roads and trails ===
Preston developed at the junction between the Indian Territory's Texas Road, leading north to Missouri, and what became the Preston Road, leading south farther into Texas. Roughly following a much older trail used by Native Americans for centuries, in 1840–1841, Colonel William Gordon Cooke created the military road from Coffee's trading house on the Red River to Austin. The Preston Road was originally 100 miles (160 km) long, from Preston to the Trinity River at Dallas.

=== Fort Preston ===
The Republic of Texas commissioned Colonel Cooke to make a supply post in the area, known as Fort Preston after Captain William Gilwater Preston, a member of the military road expedition of 1840–1841. Some doubt remains that the town was named after him, and the origin of the name of the town is obscure. In 1840, Cooke was in charge of a company of men there. Coffee and other settlers were thinking about leaving the area before Cooke arrived. The village around Fort Preston grew up to be known as Preston, Texas. Fort Preston was established 80 yards west of the eastern bend in the river, on a bluff about 40 to 50 feet (12 to 15 m) above the river. Some of the buildings at Fort Preston were made of bricks made in the area.

Later, the United States Army operated a depot to supply the Fifth Infantry from here. The Army depot operated from 1851 to 1853. The Preston Supply Depot was under the command of Lt. Thomas C. English and later by Bvt. Maj. W. F. Wood. Albert Sidney Johnston and the Second Cavalry came through Preston in 1855.

=== Glen Eden ===
When Holland Coffee married Sophia Suttonfield Aughinbaugh in 1839, they resided at his trading post in a 100-foot (30 m) square log stockade on the Red River. The stockade enclosed several huts and cabins. In 1843, Coffee began building Glen Eden as a proper house for his wife, 2 miles (3 km) west of his trading post. It was completed in 1845. Holland Coffee was killed on October 1, 1846. Sophia later married several more times, and Glen Eden became the most famous residence in the area.

=== The town ===
Preston developed in the area around Coffee's trading house and was a considerable town in 1845 when William H. Hunt completed its town plat survey. The municipal government was established in 1851 with Tom Jackson as the first mayor. Preston's Masonic lodge was established in 1852. A United States post office was established in 1856, and later a post office operated from 1880 to 1914. Preston had general stores and at least one blacksmith shop.

=== Cattle crossing ===
As the cattle business developed in Texas and cattle trails to processing facilities in Kansas became necessary, the Shawnee Trail developed through the Preston area.

The crossing had been an important wagon crossing before 1850, with over 1,000 wagons crossing there in a year.

=== Ferries ===
Log raft ferry service was available at the trading post in 1839.

Holland Coffee, George Butts, and Slone Love operated ferries in the area.

Rock Bluff Ferry operated near the mouth of the Washita River close to Preston. In the late 1830s, James Tyson operated the ferry at the rock bluff. His ferry was little more than a log raft. Later, two partners owned this ferry, Jim Shannon and Bud Randolph.

Around 1853, Ben Colbert opened up his ferry downstream to cash in on the California gold rush. Preston was located on one branch of the California Trail, where it crossed into Texas from the Indian Territory.

About 6 miles (10 km) west of Colberts was Thompson's Ferry, run by James George Thompson, first chief justice in Grayson County. Thompson's home became the first post office and courthouse in the county.

=== Hopes for expansion ===
Supplying the military posts in the frontier area was difficult. One idea was to expand and supply the army depot at Preston by steamboat. This plan was abandoned in 1853 due to the difficulty of navigating the upper Red River because of the Great Raft logjam. Later, after the destruction of the Great Raft, steamboats on the Red River were finally able to navigate up the river to Preston. Preston had a steamboat landing.

In 1847, the Texas Legislature ordered a road to be built from Preston to Sherman.

In 1853, Congress funded an exploration of the best route west of the Mississippi for a transcontinental railroad. In February 1854, an expedition of 75 men led by Capt. John Pope surveyed a route along the 32nd parallel north from New Mexico to Preston. Secretary of War Jefferson Davis favored this path, though it was tabled until after the Civil War. This route was afterwards abandoned. After the Civil War, the First transcontinental railroad was surveyed and constructed farther to the north.

== Decline ==
Although Preston developed as the largest community in the area for many years, several factors led to its decline. When new counties were created by the Texas Legislature, their county seats were located near the center of the counties. After the Texas Legislature created Grayson County from Fannin County, the county seat was designated near the center of the new county, at Sherman. As the county government developed, the focus of growth left Preston. The site of Sherman was situated east of the Preston Trail and caused travelers passing through the area from the north to the south to gravitate east of Preston.

=== Butterfield trail ===
The Butterfield Overland Mail stage route, between St. Louis and San Francisco, began operation in 1857. The line ran across the Indian Territory from Fort Smith, Arkansas, to the Red River at Colbert's Ferry, a few miles east of Preston. The stage line had decided to bypass Preston as the traditional crossing on the Red River. Colbert's Ferry became a more popular crossing over the Red River as Sherman and McKinney developed. In 1857, Sherman was very small, made up of only two or three small stores. Much of the brick and material came from older buildings at Preston. By 1871, 14 stage lines were operating through Sherman.

=== MK&T Railroad ===
After the Civil War, the peace treaty between the United States and the Five Civilized Tribes allowed for a railroad to be built north and south across the Indian Territory. This railroad, the Missouri, Kansas and Texas, crossed the Red River near Colbert's Ferry to the east of Preston in 1871. By this time Preston had begun to decline and was largely abandoned. As other cities along the railroad's route prospered, Preston became a rural community.

=== 20th century ===
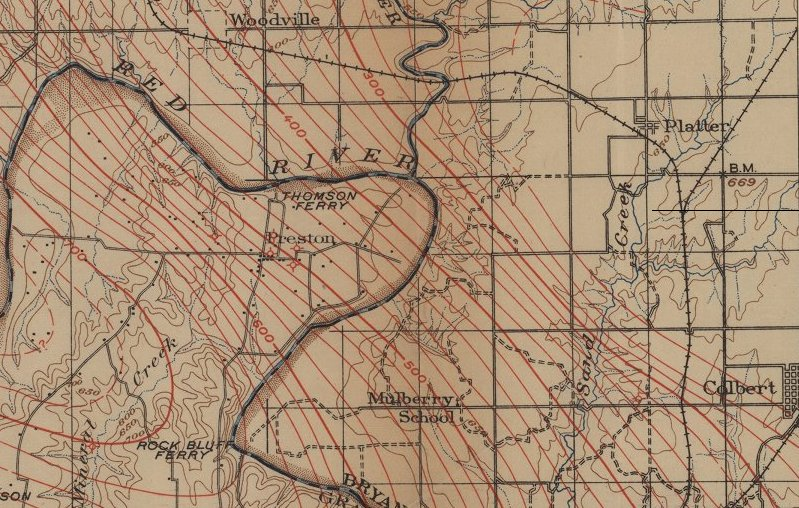
Area around Preston in 1922

In the 20th century, Preston had a public school system, two churches, a cotton gin, and a cemetery. In the 1930s, the town had about 20 residents.

New Preston developed more centrally within the bend.

=== Lake Texoma ===
The United States Congress authorized Lake Texoma's construction by the Flood Control Act of 1938 approved June 28, 1938, (Public Law 75-791) for flood control and generation of hydroelectric power. The lake's area submerged the Preston townsite. The United States Army Corps of Engineers bought all the land in the area in the late 1930s for Lake Texoma.

After the filling of Lake Texoma, only the cemetery was left from Preston; which was on high ground overlooking the town. The cemetery was expanded with a new section when Lake Texoma was created. Some of the existing graves that were to be under the lake were moved to the new section of the cemetery.

Preston Point is the peninsula in Lake Texoma that was the high ground overlooking the town of Preston. An unincorporated community named Preston exists on this peninsula, consisting largely of campgrounds and recreational cabins.

== Demographics ==
Historical population
Census	Pop.	Note	%±
2010	2,096		—
2020	2,101		0.2%
U.S. Decennial Census; 1850–1900 1910; 1920 1930 1940; 1950 1960 1970; 1980 1990 2000; 2010 2020

Preston first appeared as a census designated place in the 2010 U.S. census.

Preston CDP, Texas – Racial and ethnic composition Note: the US Census treats Hispanic/Latino as an ethnic category. This table excludes Latinos from the racial categories and assigns them to a separate category. Hispanics/Latinos may be of any race.
Race / Ethnicity (NH = Non-Hispanic)	Pop 2010	Pop 2020	% 2010	% 2020
White alone (NH)	1,968	1,845	93.89%	87.82%
Black or African American alone (NH)	1	6	0.05%	0.29%
Native American or Alaska Native alone (NH)	24	35	1.15%	1.67%
Asian alone (NH)	12	6	0.57%	0.29%
Native Hawaiian or Pacific Islander alone (NH)	0	1	0.00%	0.05%
Other race alone (NH)	0	6	0.00%	0.29%
Mixed race or Multiracial (NH)	47	113	2.24%	5.38%
Hispanic or Latino (any race)	44	89	2.10%	4.24%
Total	2,096	2,101	100.00%	100.00%

As of the 2020 United States census, there were 2,101 people, 834 households, and 355 families residing in the CDP.

=== 2000 census ===
The population of Preston was 325 in 2000.

== Geography ==
Preston was located in Texas on its border with the Indian Territory (later the state of Oklahoma) in the Red River Valley on a river bend just downstream from the river's confluence with the Washita River. The area was also known as Washita Bend or Coffee Bend. This area is located a few miles east of the Cross Timbers on the upper Red River above the former Great Raft logjam. A rock bluff overlooked the Red River from the Texas side of the river, 100 to 110 feet (30 to 34 m) above the river's low-water mark. This bluff at Preston marked the ford of an old Indian trail on the Red River. This ford was later used as the Red River crossing point of the Shawnee Cattle Trail. Later, the bluff also marked the return route of Captain Randolph B. Marcy's expedition from Santa Fe to Fort Smith in 1849. The Oklahoma side of the river was a relatively flat, sand-covered plain and terraces sloping gently to the river.

The current Preston CDP occupies the entire Preston Peninsula, bordered to the west by the main body of Lake Texoma and to the east by the Little Mineral Arm of the lake. The peninsula ends to the north at Preston Point, and the CDP extends south to the base of the peninsula, at Meadow Lake Drive to the east and at Highport Road to the west. Texas State Highway 289 has its northern terminus in Preston and leads south 7 miles (11 km) to Pottsboro. Denison is 14 miles (23 km) to the southeast, and Sherman, the Grayson County seat, is 20 miles (32 km) to the south-southeast.

According to the U.S. Census Bureau, the Preston CDP has a total area of 8.1 square miles (21.1 km^{2}), of which 5.1 square miles (13.1 km^{2}) are land and 3.1 square miles (8.0 km^{2}), or 38.02%, are covered by water, consisting of the adjoining waters of Lake Texoma.
