= Offa S. Lattimore =

American politician

Offa Shivers Lattimore

Member of the Texas Senate from the 30th district
- In office January 10, 1911 – January 14, 1919
- Preceded by: David M. Alexander
- Succeeded by: Robert Carlock

Personal details
- Born: January 10, 1865 Marion, Alabama, US
- Died: October 27, 1937 (aged 72) Austin, Texas, US
- Party: Democratic
- Education: Baylor University (BA)

Offa Shivers Lattimore (January 10, 1865 – October 27, 1937) was an American politician and judge. He represented District 30 of the Texas Senate for eight years, from 1911 to 1919. He was subsequently elected as a judge for the Texas Court of Criminal Appeals, where he served until his death in 1937.

== Early life ==
Lattimore was born in Marion, Alabama, on January 10, 1865, to Sarah Catherine (née Shivers) and John Lee Lattimore. When he was twelve, the family moved to Falls County, Texas. Lattimore graduated from Baylor University in 1887. He studied law in Marlin, Texas, where he was admitted to the bar in 1889.

== Political career ==
Lattimore was elected to represent District 30 of the Texas Senate in 1910. After assuming his seat in 1911, he served in the Texas Senate until 1919. He served as president pro tempore of the Texas Senate during the Thirty-third Texas Legislature.

Lattimore then served as a judge on the Texas Court of Criminal Appeals after his election in 1918.

== Death ==
Lattimore died on October 27, 1937, in a hospital in Austin, Texas, after suffering a stroke.
