= Rick Hardcastle =

American politician

Richard Lynn "Rick" Hardcastle

Texas State Representative from District 68 (then Baylor, Clay, Cooke, Cottle, Dickens, Foard, Hardeman, Haskell, Jack, King, Knox, Montague, Motley, Throckmorton, Wilbarger, and Young counties)
- In office January 8, 1999 – January 12, 2013
- Preceded by: Charles Adkins Finnell
- Succeeded by: Drew Springer Jr.

Personal details
- Born: April 6, 1956 (age 70) Sherman; Grayson County; Texas, USA
- Party: Republican
- Spouse: Nancy Zeissel Hardcastle
- Children: Two children
- Education: Tarleton State University
- Occupation: Businessman; Rancher

Richard Lynn Hardcastle, known as Rick Hardcastle (born April 6, 1956), is an American businessman and rancher who is a Republican former member of the Texas House of Representatives from District 68 in the eastern South Plains.

In Hardcastle's last term, the district included sixteen counties: Baylor Clay, Cooke, Cottle, Dickens, Foard, Hardeman, Haskell, Jack, King, Knox, Montague, Motley, Thorckmorton, Wilbarger, and Young counties. However, in 2013, because of redistricting District 68 was expanded to twenty-two counties with several changes from the above listing. It is now represented by Republican Drew Springer Jr. of Muenster, Texas.

== Background ==
A native of Sherman in Grayson County in North Texas, Hardcastle attended Tarleton State University in Stephenville, Texas. Since 1998, he has been employed by the Rolling H. Cattle Company in Vernon in Wilbarger County, Texas. From 1975 to 1997, he operated his own company, Hardcastle AgAir. He and his wife, the former Nancy Zeissel (born 1954), have two children. He is Roman Catholic.

== Political life ==
In the spring of 1998, Hardcastle won the Republican nomination for House District 68, 65-35 percent over Waco Tabor. He then narrowly won the 1998 general election when he unseated by 257 votes the incumbent Democrat Charles Adkins Finnell of Holliday in Archer County, which was then within District 68. Hardcastle polled 14,854 votes (50.4 percent) to Finnell's 14,597 (49.6 percent).

Representative Hardcastle was the chairman of the Agriculture and Livestock Committee in the 2003, 2005, and 2011 legislative sessions. He was a member of the Border and Intergovernmental Affairs Committee in 2007 and in his last regular session in 2011.

In 2001, Phyllis Schlafly's Eagle Forum rated Hardcastle 73 percent conservative, compared to 100 percent for subsequent Speaker of the Texas House of Representatives Tom Craddick of Midland, among the higher evaluations of Texas lawmakers.

Representative Hardcastle voted in 2007 to allow an individual to use deadly force in self-defense. He opposed a pay increase for public school employees. Hardcastle voted to require photo identification for voting or the presentation of two non-photo ID cards to verify a person's identity. He voted with the House majority to reduce the fee for a marriage license from $60 to $30. He voted for casino gambling on Indian reservations; the measure died in the House on a 66–66 vote.

In another vote in 2007, Hardcastle supported legislation to permit religious expression in public schools. Signed into law by Governor Perry, the measure allows students to express their religious beliefs in classroom assignments, to organize prayer groups and other religious clubs, and permits speakers at school events such as graduation ceremonies to mention religious matters.

In 2009, Hardcastle voted against House-approved legislation to require retail fish dealers to post warning signs regarding high levels of mercury in fresh and frozen fish. Hardcastle voted in 2009 to establish a state-funded law school in Dallas.

In 2011, Hardcastle voted to tax sales via the Internet if the company has a physical presence in Texas. Though the measure passed the House, 125–20, it was vetoed by Governor Perry. He voted to reduce funding for state agencies. He voted for a bill to ban texting while driving, another measure which Perry vetoed. He voted against a law signed by Perry which permits corporal punishment in public schools but only with parental consent. Hardcastle voted against the House majority to ban smoking in most public places. He voted for a House-approved amendment offered in 2011 by conservative Representative Wayne Christian to require public colleges and universities to fund student centers that promote family and traditional values.

Hardcastle voted to restrict state funding to facilities which perform abortions. He first sponsored legislation in 2011 to require women in Texas who procure abortions to undergo an ultrasound to be informed of the progress in the development of the child. Then on May 5, 2011, Hardcastle reversed himself and voted against the compulsory ultrasound, which the House still approved, 94–41. He voted for legislation, passed 102–40 in the House and signed by Governor Perry, which authorizes a county, when determining eligibility for a "sponsored alien" under the Indigent Health Care and Treatment Act, to include in the resources of the applicant any additional incomes of their spouse and sponsor.

Physically unable to seek reelection in 2012, Hardcastle has multiple sclerosis and has undergone adult stem cell surgery for his condition.

On April 18, 2012, Hardcastle was honored at a retirement party attended by many of his legislative colleagues held at the Red River Valley Museum in Vernon.

Preceded by Charles Adkins Finnell	Texas State Representative from District 68 (then Baylor, Clay, Cooke, Cottle, Dickens, Foard, Hardeman, Haskell, Jack, King, Knox, Montague, Motley, Throckmorton, Wilbarger, Young counties); 1999–2013	Succeeded by Drew Springer Jr.
