= Texas's 30th Senate district =

American legislative district

Texas's 30th State Senate district
Senator
Brent Hagenbuch; R–Denton
- Demographics: 72.8% White; 6.7% Black; 17.2% Hispanic; 2.4% Asian
- Population: 914,739

District 30 of the Texas Senate is a senatorial district that currently serves all of Archer, Clay, Cooke, Grayson, Jack, Montague, and Young counties, and portions of Collin, Denton, Parker, and Wichita counties in the U.S. state of Texas.

The district is currently represented by Brent Hagenbuch who took office in January 2025, replacing Drew Springer.

== Biggest cities in the district ==
District 30 has a population of 829,574 with 623,474 that are at voting age from the 2010 census.

	Name	County	Pop. (Note: Population is based on the number of people in the district in that city, not the overall population of that city)
1	Wichita Falls	Wichita	104,553
2	Denton	Denton	73,602
3	Sherman	Grayson	38,521
4	Wylie	Collin	28,082
5	Weatherford	Parker	25,250

== Election history ==
Election history of District 30 from 1992. (Note: Uncontested primary elections are not shown.)

=== 2024 ===
Texas general election, 2024: Senate District 30
Party	Candidate	Votes	%
Republican	Brent Hagenbuch	289,981	65.03
Democratic	Dale Frey	155,949	34.97
Majority		134,032	30.06
Turnout		445,930	
Republican hold			

=== 2022 ===
Drew Springer Jr. (Republican) was unopposed; as such, the election was cancelled and Springer was declared elected without a vote.

=== 2020 (special) ===
Texas Senate District 30 special runoff election - 19 December 2020
Party	Candidate	Votes	%	±%
Republican	Drew Springer Jr.	32,761	56.49	
Republican	Shelley Luther	25,235	43.51	
Majority		7,526	12.98	
Total votes		57,996	100.0	
Republican hold				

Texas's 30th State Senate District Special Election, 2020
Party	Candidate	Votes	%
Republican	Shelley Luther	22,135	32.2
Republican	Drew Springer Jr.	21,971	31.9
Democratic	Jacob Minter	14,572	21.2
Republican	Christopher Watts	4,284	6.2
Republican	Craig Carter	3,413	5.0
Republican	Andy Hopper	2,432	3.5
Total votes		68,807	100.0

=== 2018 ===
Pat Fallon defeated incumbent Craig Estes in the 2018 Republican primary.

Texas general election, 2018: Senate District 30
Party	Candidate	Votes	%	±%
Republican	Pat Fallon	234,374	73.92	−12.73
Democratic	Kevin Lopez	82,669	26.08	+26.08
Majority		151,705	47.84	−25.46
Turnout		317,043		
Republican hold				

=== 2014 ===
Texas general election, 2014: Senate District 30
Party	Candidate	Votes	%	±%
Republican	Craig L. Estes (Incumbent)	140,240	86.65	+0.53
Libertarian	Cory Lane	21,599	13.35	−0.53
Majority		118,641	73.30	+1.06
Turnout		161,839		
Republican hold				

=== 2012 ===
Texas general election, 2012: Senate District 30
Party	Candidate	Votes	%	±%
Republican	Craig L. Estes (Incumbent)	217,877	86.12	+13.88
Libertarian	Richard Wells Forsythe, Jr.	35,127	13.88	+13.88
Majority		182,750	72.24	−27.76
Turnout		253,004		
Republican hold				

=== 2008 ===
Texas general election, 2008: Senate District 30
Party	Candidate	Votes	%	±%
Republican	Craig L. Estes (Incumbent)	221,470	100.00	+30.95
Majority		221,470	100.00	+61.91
Turnout		221,470		
Republican hold				

=== 2004 ===
Texas general election, 2004: Senate District 30
Party	Candidate	Votes	%	±%
Republican	Craig L. Estes (Incumbent)	182,057	69.05	+1.49
Democratic	Paul S. Gibbs	81,614	30.95	+1.18
Majority		100,443	38.09	+0.31
Turnout		263,671		+63.16
Republican hold				

=== 2002 ===
Texas general election, 2002: Senate District 30
Party	Candidate	Votes	%	±%
Republican	Craig L. Estes (Incumbent)	109,167	67.55	+4.91
Democratic	Donald L. Acheson	48,110	29.77	−7.58
Libertarian	Diane Wilson	4,321	2.67	+2.67
Majority		61,057	37.78	+12.49
Turnout				
Republican hold				

Republican primary, 2002: Senate District 30
Candidate		Votes	%	±
	Dave Deison	11,508	42.30	
✓	Craig L. Estes (Incumbent)	15,698	57.70	
Majority		4,190	15.40	
Turnout				

Democratic primary, 2002: Senate District 30
Candidate		Votes	%	±
✓	Donald R. Acheson	12,723	57.01	
	Robert H. Fenoglio, Sr.	9,595	42.99	
Majority		3,128	14.02	
Turnout		22,318		

=== 2001 (special) ===
Texas Senate District 30 special runoff election - 4 December 2001
Party	Candidate	Votes	%	±%
Republican	Craig Estes	109,167	62.70	+15.49
Democratic	Greg L. Underwood	9,120	37.30	+14.38
Majority		6,212	25.40	
Turnout		24,452		
Republican hold				

Texas Senate District 30 special election - 6 November 2001
Party	Candidate	Votes	%
Republican	Craig Estes	16,870	47.21
Democratic	Greg L. Underwood	8,189	22.92
Republican	Kirk Wilson	6,105	17.09
Republican	Harry Reynolds	2,908	8.14
Republican	Doug Jeffrey	1,139	3.19
Independent	Rick Bunch	520	1.46
Turnout		35,731	

=== 1998 ===
Texas general election, 1998: Senate District 30
Party	Candidate	Votes	%	±%
Republican	Tom Haywood (Incumbent)	82,996	62.65	+11.44
Democratic	Greg Underwood	49,483	37.35	−11.44
Majority		33,513	25.30	+22.88
Turnout		132,479		
Republican hold				

=== 1994 ===
Texas general election, 1994: Senate District 30
Party	Candidate	Votes	%	±%
Democratic	Steven A. Carriker (Incumbent)	73,964	48.79	−1.94
Republican	Tom Haywood	77,626	51.21	+1.94
Majority		3,662	2.42	+0.95
Turnout				
Republican gain from Democratic				

Republican primary, 1994: Senate District 30
Candidate		Votes	%	±
✓	Tom Haywood	9,284	65.60	
	Doyle High	4,868	34.40	
Majority		4,416	31.20	
Turnout		14,152		

=== 1992 ===
Texas general election, 1992: Senate District 30
Party	Candidate	Votes	%	±%
Democratic	Steven A. Carriker (Incumbent)	100,079	50.73	
Republican	Tom Haywood	97,180	49.27	
Majority		2,899	1.47	
Turnout		197,259		
Democratic hold				

== District officeholders ==
Legislature	Senator, District 30	Counties in District
5	Antoine Supervièle	Bexar.
6	Antoine Supervièle	Bexar.
7	Isaiah Addison Paschal	Bexar.
8	Isaiah Addison Paschal	Bexar.
9	N. A. Mitchell	Bexar.
10	N. A. Mitchell; William B. Knox	Bexar.
11	William B. Knox	Bexar.
12	Albert Jennings Fountain	Atascosa, Cameron, Dimmit, Duval, El Paso, Encinal, Frio, Hidalgo, Karnes, Kinney, La Salle, Live Oak, Maverick, McMullen, Medina, Nueces, Presidio, Starr, Uvalde, Webb, Zapata, Zavala.
13	Albert Jennings Fountain	Atascosa, Cameron, Dimmit, Duval, El Paso, Encinal, Frio, Hidalgo, Karnes, Kinney, La Salle, Live Oak, Maverick, McMullen, Medina, Nueces, Presidio, Starr, Uvalde, Webb, Zapata, Zavala.
14	William J. Russell, Jr.	All of Cameron, Dimmit, Duval, El Paso, Encinal, Frio, Hidalgo, Kinney, La Salle, Maverick, McMullen, Medina, Nueces, Pecos, Presidio, Starr, Uvalde, Webb, Zapata, Zavala. Portion of Bexar.
15	James Harvey McLeary	Bandera, Bexar, Comal, Concho, Crockett, Edwards, El Paso, Gillespie, Kendall, Kerr, Kimble, Mason, Menard, Pecos, Presidio, Tom Green.
16	Augustus W. Houston	Bandera, Bexar, Comal, Concho, Crockett, Edwards, El Paso, Gillespie, Kendall, Kerr, Kimble, Mason, Menard, Pecos, Presidio, Tom Green.
17	Augustus W. Houston	Bandera, Bexar, Comal, Concho, Crockett, Edwards, El Paso, Gillespie, Kendall, Kerr, Kimble, Mason, Menard, Pecos, Presidio, Tom Green.
18	John Henry Traylor	Bosque, Erath, Hood, Palo Pinto, Somervell.
19	John Henry Traylor	Bosque, Erath, Hood, Palo Pinto, Somervell.
20	Louis N. Frank	Bosque, Erath, Hood, Palo Pinto, Somervell.
21	Louis N. Frank	Bosque, Erath, Hood, Palo Pinto, Somervell.
22	Louis N. Frank	Bosque, Erath, Hood, Palo Pinto, Somervell.
23	James W. Swayne	Hood, Parker, Somervell, Tarrant.
24	William J. Bailey	Hood, Parker, Somervell, Tarrant.
25	William J. Bailey	Hood, Parker, Somervell, Tarrant.
26	William A. Hanger	Hood, Parker, Somervell, Tarrant.
27	William A. Hanger	Hood, Parker, Somervell, Tarrant.
28	William A. Hanger	Hood, Parker, Somervell, Tarrant.
29	William A. Hanger	Hood, Parker, Somervell, Tarrant.
30	David M. Alexander	Hood, Parker, Somervell, Tarrant.
31	David M. Alexander	Hood, Parker, Somervell, Tarrant.
32	Offa S. Lattimore	Hood, Parker, Somervell, Tarrant.
33	Offa S. Lattimore	Hood, Parker, Somervell, Tarrant.
34	Offa S. Lattimore	Hood, Parker, Somervell, Tarrant.
35	Offa S. Lattimore	Hood, Parker, Somervell, Tarrant.
36	Robert Carlock	Hood, Parker, Somervell, Tarrant.
37	Robert Carlock	Hood, Parker, Somervell, Tarrant.
38	Robert A. Stuart	Hood, Parker, Somervell, Tarrant.
39	William H. Bledsoe	Andrews, Bailey, Borden, Cochran, Cottle, Crosby, Dawson, Dickens, Floyd, Gaines, Garza, Hale, Hockley, Howard, Kent, King, Lamb, Lubbock, Lynn, Martin, Motley, Stonewall, Terry, Yoakum.
40	William H. Bledsoe	Andrews, Bailey, Borden, Cochran, Cottle, Crosby, Dawson, Dickens, Floyd, Gaines, Garza, Hale, Hockley, Howard, Kent, King, Lamb, Lubbock, Lynn, Martin, Motley, Stonewall, Terry, Yoakum.
41	Pink L. Parrish	Andrews, Bailey, Borden, Cochran, Cottle, Crosby, Dawson, Dickens, Floyd, Gaines, Garza, Hale, Hockley, Howard, Kent, King, Lamb, Lubbock, Lynn, Martin, Motley, Stonewall, Terry, Yoakum.
42	Pink L. Parrish	Andrews, Bailey, Borden, Cochran, Cottle, Crosby, Dawson, Dickens, Floyd, Gaines, Garza, Hale, Hockley, Howard, Kent, King, Lamb, Lubbock, Lynn, Martin, Motley, Stonewall, Terry, Yoakum.
43	Arthur Pope Duggan	Andrews, Bailey, Borden, Cochran, Cottle, Crosby, Dawson, Dickens, Floyd, Gaines, Garza, Hale, Hockley, Howard, Kent, King, Lamb, Lubbock, Lynn, Martin, Motley, Stonewall, Terry, Yoakum.
44	Arthur Pope Duggan; G. Hobert Nelson	Andrews, Bailey, Borden, Cochran, Cottle, Crosby, Dawson, Dickens, Floyd, Gaines, Garza, Hale, Hockley, Howard, Kent, King, Lamb, Lubbock, Lynn, Martin, Motley, Stonewall, Terry, Yoakum.
45	G. Hobert Nelson	Andrews, Bailey, Borden, Cochran, Cottle, Crosby, Dawson, Dickens, Floyd, Gaines, Garza, Hale, Hockley, Howard, Kent, King, Lamb, Lubbock, Lynn, Martin, Motley, Stonewall, Terry, Yoakum.
46	G. Hobert Nelson	Andrews, Bailey, Borden, Cochran, Cottle, Crosby, Dawson, Dickens, Floyd, Gaines, Garza, Hale, Hockley, Howard, Kent, King, Lamb, Lubbock, Lynn, Martin, Motley, Stonewall, Terry, Yoakum.
47	Marshall Formby	Andrews, Bailey, Borden, Cochran, Cottle, Crosby, Dawson, Dickens, Floyd, Gaines, Garza, Hale, Hockley, Howard, Kent, King, Lamb, Lubbock, Lynn, Martin, Motley, Stonewall, Terry, Yoakum.
48	Marshall Formby	Andrews, Bailey, Borden, Cochran, Cottle, Crosby, Dawson, Dickens, Floyd, Gaines, Garza, Hale, Hockley, Howard, Kent, King, Lamb, Lubbock, Lynn, Martin, Motley, Stonewall, Terry, Yoakum.
49	Sterling J. Parrish	Andrews, Bailey, Borden, Cochran, Cottle, Crosby, Dawson, Dickens, Floyd, Gaines, Garza, Hale, Hockley, Howard, Kent, King, Lamb, Lubbock, Lynn, Martin, Motley, Stonewall, Terry, Yoakum.
50	Sterling J. Parrish	Andrews, Bailey, Borden, Cochran, Cottle, Crosby, Dawson, Dickens, Floyd, Gaines, Garza, Hale, Hockley, Howard, Kent, King, Lamb, Lubbock, Lynn, Martin, Motley, Stonewall, Terry, Yoakum.
51	Kilmer Blane Corbin, Sr.	Andrews, Bailey, Borden, Cochran, Cottle, Crosby, Dawson, Dickens, Floyd, Gaines, Garza, Hale, Hockley, Howard, Kent, King, Lamb, Lubbock, Lynn, Martin, Motley, Stonewall, Terry, Yoakum.
52	Kilmer Blane Corbin, Sr.	Andrews, Bailey, Borden, Cochran, Cottle, Crosby, Dawson, Dickens, Floyd, Gaines, Garza, Hale, Hockley, Howard, Kent, King, Lamb, Lubbock, Lynn, Martin, Motley, Stonewall, Terry, Yoakum.
53	Andrew J. "Andy" Rogers	Armstrong, Bailey, Briscoe, Castro, Childress, Collingsworth, Deaf Smith, Donley, Floyd, Hale, Hall, Lamb, Motley, Parmer, Swisher.
54	Andrew J. "Andy" Rogers	Armstrong, Bailey, Briscoe, Castro, Childress, Collingsworth, Deaf Smith, Donley, Floyd, Hale, Hall, Lamb, Motley, Parmer, Swisher.
55	Andrew J. "Andy" Rogers	Armstrong, Bailey, Briscoe, Castro, Childress, Collingsworth, Deaf Smith, Donley, Floyd, Hale, Hall, Lamb, Motley, Parmer, Swisher.
56	Andrew J. "Andy" Rogers	Armstrong, Bailey, Briscoe, Castro, Childress, Collingsworth, Deaf Smith, Donley, Floyd, Hale, Hall, Lamb, Motley, Parmer, Swisher.
57	Andrew J. "Andy" Rogers	Armstrong, Bailey, Briscoe, Castro, Childress, Collingsworth, Deaf Smith, Donley, Floyd, Hale, Hall, Lamb, Motley, Parmer, Swisher.
58	Andrew J. "Andy" Rogers	Armstrong, Bailey, Briscoe, Castro, Childress, Collingsworth, Deaf Smith, Donley, Floyd, Hale, Hall, Lamb, Motley, Parmer, Swisher.
59	Andrew J. "Andy" Rogers	Armstrong, Bailey, Briscoe, Castro, Childress, Collingsworth, Deaf Smith, Donley, Floyd, Hale, Hall, Lamb, Motley, Parmer, Swisher.
60	Jack Hightower	Archer, Bailey, Baylor, Briscoe, Castro, Childress, Cottle, Dickens, Floyd, Foard, Hale, Hall, Hardeman, King, Knox, Lamb, Motley, Parmer, Swisher, Wichita, Wilbarger.
61	Jack Hightower	Archer, Bailey, Baylor, Briscoe, Castro, Childress, Cottle, Dickens, Floyd, Foard, Hale, Hall, Hardeman, King, Knox, Lamb, Motley, Parmer, Swisher, Wichita, Wilbarger.
62	Jack Hightower	Archer, Bailey, Baylor, Briscoe, Castro, Childress, Cottle, Dickens, Floyd, Foard, Hale, Hall, Hardeman, King, Knox, Lamb, Motley, Parmer, Swisher, Wichita, Wilbarger.
63	Jack Hightower	Archer, Baylor, Briscoe, Callahan, Childress, Clay, Cottle, Dickens, Fisher, Floyd, Foard, Hale, Hall, Hardeman, Haskell, Howard, Jones, Kent, King, Knox, Mitchell, Motley, Nolan, Scurry, Shackelford, Stonewall, Throckmorton, Wichita, Wilbarger.
64	Ray Farabee	Archer, Baylor, Briscoe, Callahan, Childress, Clay, Cottle, Dickens, Fisher, Floyd, Foard, Hale, Hall, Hardeman, Haskell, Howard, Jones, Kent, King, Knox, Mitchell, Motley, Nolan, Scurry, Shackelford, Stonewall, Throckmorton, Wichita, Wilbarger.
65	Ray Farabee	Archer, Baylor, Briscoe, Callahan, Childress, Clay, Cottle, Dickens, Fisher, Floyd, Foard, Hale, Hall, Hardeman, Haskell, Howard, Jones, Kent, King, Knox, Mitchell, Motley, Nolan, Scurry, Shackelford, Stonewall, Throckmorton, Wichita, Wilbarger.
66	Ray Farabee	Archer, Baylor, Briscoe, Callahan, Childress, Clay, Cottle, Dickens, Fisher, Floyd, Foard, Hale, Hall, Hardeman, Haskell, Howard, Jones, Kent, King, Knox, Mitchell, Motley, Nolan, Scurry, Shackelford, Stonewall, Throckmorton, Wichita, Wilbarger.
67	Ray Farabee	Archer, Baylor, Briscoe, Callahan, Childress, Clay, Cottle, Dickens, Fisher, Floyd, Foard, Hale, Hall, Hardeman, Haskell, Howard, Jones, Kent, King, Knox, Mitchell, Motley, Nolan, Scurry, Shackelford, Stonewall, Throckmorton, Wichita, Wilbarger.
68	Ray Farabee	All of Archer, Baylor, Callahan, Childress, Clay, Cooke, Cottle, Dickens, Fisher, Floyd, Foard, Grayson, Hardeman, Haskell, Jack, Jones, Kent, King, Knox, Mitchell, Montague, Motley, Scurry, Shackelford, Stonewall, Throckmorton, Wichita, Wilbarger, Young. Portion of Denton.
69	Ray Farabee	All of Archer, Baylor, Callahan, Childress, Clay, Cooke, Cottle, Dickens, Fisher, Floyd, Foard, Grayson, Hardeman, Haskell, Jack, Jones, Kent, King, Knox, Mitchell, Montague, Motley, Scurry, Shackelford, Stonewall, Throckmorton, Wichita, Wilbarger, Young. Portion of Denton.
70	Ray Farabee	All of Archer, Baylor, Callahan, Childress, Clay, Cooke, Cottle, Dickens, Fisher, Floyd, Foard, Grayson, Hardeman, Haskell, Jack, Jones, Kent, King, Knox, Mitchell, Montague, Motley, Scurry, Shackelford, Stonewall, Throckmorton, Wichita, Wilbarger, Young. Portion of Denton.
71	Steve Carriker	All of Archer, Baylor, Callahan, Childress, Clay, Cooke, Cottle, Dickens, Fisher, Floyd, Foard, Grayson, Hardeman, Haskell, Jack, Jones, Kent, King, Knox, Mitchell, Montague, Motley, Scurry, Shackelford, Stonewall, Throckmorton, Wichita, Wilbarger, Young. Portion of Denton.
72	Steve Carriker	All of Archer, Baylor, Callahan, Childress, Clay, Cooke, Cottle, Dickens, Fisher, Floyd, Foard, Grayson, Hardeman, Haskell, Jack, Jones, Kent, King, Knox, Mitchell, Montague, Motley, Scurry, Shackelford, Stonewall, Throckmorton, Wichita, Wilbarger, Young. Portion of Denton.
73	Steve Carriker	All of Archer, Baylor, Briscoe, Childress, Clay, Collingsworth, Cooke, Cottle, Dickens, Donley, Fisher, Floyd, Foard, Grayson, Hall, Hardeman, Haskell, Jack, Jones, Kent, King, Knox, Montague, Motley, Scurry, Stephens, Stonewall, Throckmorton, Wheeler, Wichita, Wilbarger, Young. Portion of Denton.
74	Tom Haywood	All of Archer, Armstrong, Baylor, Briscoe, Carson, Castro, Childress, Clay, Collingsworth, Cooke, Cottle, Dickens, Donley, Fisher, Floyd, Foard, Grayson, Hall, Hardeman, Haskell, Jones, Kent, King, Knox, Montague, Motley, Scurry, Stonewall, Swisher, Throckmorton, Wheeler, Wichita, Wilbarger. Portions of Collin, Denton, Taylor.
75	Tom Haywood	All of Archer, Armstrong, Baylor, Briscoe, Carson, Castro, Childress, Clay, Collingsworth, Cooke, Cottle, Dickens, Donley, Fisher, Floyd, Foard, Grayson, Hall, Hardeman, Haskell, Jones, Kent, King, Knox, Montague, Motley, Scurry, Stonewall, Swisher, Throckmorton, Wheeler, Wichita, Wilbarger. Portions of Collin, Denton, Taylor.
76	Tom Haywood	All of Archer, Armstrong, Baylor, Briscoe, Carson, Castro, Childress, Clay, Collingsworth, Cooke, Cottle, Dickens, Donley, Fisher, Floyd, Foard, Grayson, Hall, Hardeman, Haskell, Jones, Kent, King, Knox, Montague, Motley, Scurry, Stonewall, Swisher, Throckmorton, Wheeler, Wichita, Wilbarger. Portions of Collin, Denton, Taylor.
77	Tom Haywood; Craig Estes	All of Archer, Armstrong, Baylor, Briscoe, Carson, Castro, Childress, Clay, Collingsworth, Cooke, Cottle, Dickens, Donley, Fisher, Floyd, Foard, Grayson, Hall, Hardeman, Haskell, Jones, Kent, King, Knox, Montague, Motley, Scurry, Stonewall, Swisher, Throckmorton, Wheeler, Wichita, Wilbarger. Portions of Collin, Denton, Taylor.
78	Craig Estes	All of Archer, Baylor, Clay, Cooke, Grayson, Jack, Montague, Palo Pinto, Parker, Shackelford, Stephens, Throckmorton, Wichita, Wilbarger, Wise, Young. Portions of Collin, Denton.
79	Craig Estes	All of Archer, Baylor, Clay, Cooke, Grayson, Jack, Montague, Palo Pinto, Parker, Shackelford, Stephens, Throckmorton, Wichita, Wilbarger, Wise, Young. Portions of Collin, Denton.
80	Craig Estes	All of Archer, Baylor, Clay, Cooke, Grayson, Jack, Montague, Palo Pinto, Parker, Shackelford, Stephens, Throckmorton, Wichita, Wilbarger, Wise, Young. Portions of Collin, Denton.
81	Craig Estes	All of Archer, Baylor, Clay, Cooke, Grayson, Jack, Montague, Palo Pinto, Parker, Shackelford, Stephens, Throckmorton, Wichita, Wilbarger, Wise, Young. Portions of Collin, Denton.
82	Craig Estes	All of Archer, Baylor, Clay, Cooke, Grayson, Jack, Montague, Palo Pinto, Parker, Shackelford, Stephens, Throckmorton, Wichita, Wilbarger, Wise, Young. Portions of Collin, Denton.
83	Craig Estes	All of Archer, Clay, Cooke, Erath, Grayson, Jack, Montague, Palo Pinto, Parker, Wichita, Wise, Young. Portions of Collin, Denton.
84	Craig Estes	All of Archer, Clay, Cooke, Erath, Grayson, Jack, Montague, Palo Pinto, Parker, Wichita, Wise, Young. Portions of Collin, Denton.
85	Craig Estes	All of Archer, Clay, Cooke, Erath, Grayson, Jack, Montague, Palo Pinto, Parker, Wichita, Wise, Young. Portions of Collin, Denton.
86	Pat Fallon	All of Archer, Clay, Cooke, Erath, Grayson, Jack, Montague, Palo Pinto, Parker, Wichita, Wise, Young. Portions of Collin, Denton.
87	Drew Springer	All of Archer, Clay, Cooke, Erath, Grayson, Jack, Montague, Palo Pinto, Parker, Wichita, Wise, Young. Portions of Collin, Denton.
88	Drew Springer	All of Archer, Clay, Cooke, Grayson, Jack, Montague, Young. Portions of Collin, Denton, Parker, Wichita.
89	Brent Hagenbuch	All of Archer, Clay, Cooke, Grayson, Jack, Montague, Young. Portions of Collin, Denton, Parker, Wichita.
