= Pat Fallon =

American businessman and politician (born 1967)

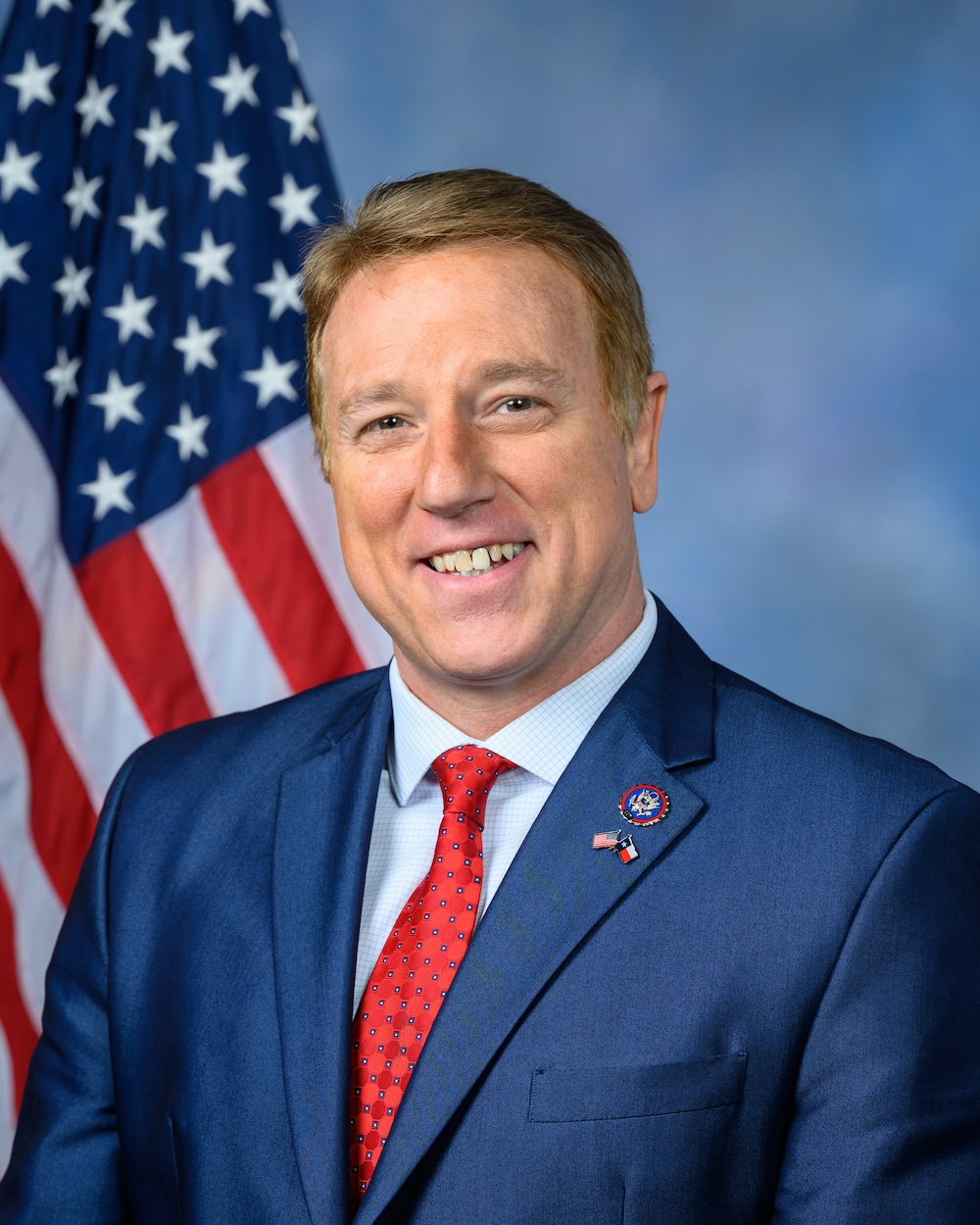
- Official portrait, 2022

Member of the U.S. House of Representatives from Texas's 4th district
- Incumbent
- Assumed office January 3, 2021
- Preceded by: John Ratcliffe

Member of the Texas Senate from the 30th district
- In office January 8, 2019 – January 3, 2021
- Preceded by: Craig Estes
- Succeeded by: Drew Springer

Member of the Texas House of Representatives from the 106th district
- In office January 8, 2013 – January 8, 2019
- Preceded by: Rodney Anderson
- Succeeded by: Jared Patterson

Personal details
- Born: Patrick Edward Fallon; December 19, 1967 (age 58) Pittsfield, Massachusetts, U.S.
- Party: Republican
- Spouse: Susan Garner
- Children: 2
- Education: University of Notre Dame (BA)
- Website: House website Campaign website

Military service
- Allegiance: United States
- Branch/service: United States Air Force
- Years of service: 1990–1994
- Rank: Second Lieuteant
- Awards: Air Force Achievement Medal
- Fallon's voice Fallon questioning hearing witnesses regarding the Department of Defense. Recorded May 6, 2025

Patrick Edward Fallon (born December 19, 1967) is an American businessman and politician. A member of the Republican Party, he has been the U.S. representative for Texas's 4th congressional district since 2021. Fallon was also a member of the Texas House of Representatives for the 106th district from 2013 to 2019 and represented the 30th district of the Texas Senate from 2019 to 2021.

Fallon is a member of the new House Department of Government Efficiency Committee.

== Early life and education ==
Fallon was born in Pittsfield, Massachusetts. Both his parents were public school teachers, and he was raised in suburban areas, growing up in the largest city in Berkshire County.

Fallon earned his Bachelor of Arts degree in government and international relations from the University of Notre Dame, where he played varsity football under coach Lou Holtz and was part of the 1988 national championship team. He ran a t-shirt business as a student and participated in campus political activities. He was a cadet in the Air Force Reserve Officers Training Corps and was commissioned as a second lieutenant in the United States Air Force upon graduation. He then served in the Air Force for four years, during which he received the Air Force Achievement Medal.

== Career ==
After college, Fallon relocated to Denton County, Texas, in the early 1990s. He is the president and chief executive officer of Virtus Apparel, a company that specializes in clothing of military and patriotic design. Based in Prosper, Texas, it has a dozen national locations and about 100 total employees.

=== Politics ===
In 2009, Fallon launched a campaign that netted him 57% of the vote to defeat three opponents for an at-large seat on the Frisco City Council. In the Denton County portion of Frisco, which consists of about one-third of the voters in House District 106, Fallon polled 65% of the vote. In his first year on the city council, Fallon voted against a tax rate increase. In 2010, he voted against a city budget that would have increased the municipal debt. In May 2011, his council colleagues selected him to serve as mayor pro tem.

In 2012 Fallon won the Republican nomination in the reconfigured District 106, in which incumbent Republican Rodney Anderson of Grand Prairie did not run. Instead, Anderson unseated incumbent Republican Linda Harper-Brown in the 2014 primary election in neighboring District 105. Fallon won the general election on November 6, 2012, with 41,785 votes (83.2%) to Libertarian Party nominee Rodney Caston's 8,455 (16.8%). Fallon faced no Democratic Party opponent in the election.

Fallon co-authored a 2013 Texas law that allows students and employees of independent school districts to say "Merry Christmas" rather than the secular "Happy Holidays".

Fallon ran unopposed for the Republican nomination in 2014 and defeated Democrat Lisa Osterholt and Libertarian Rodney Caston in the general election with 24,419 votes, almost 70% of the total. In the 2016 Republican primary, Fallon defeated challenger Trent Trubenbach with 16,106 votes (82.9%) to Tubenbach's 3,327 (17.1%). He won the general election with 80.8% of the vote.

In July 2017, Fallon announced that he would challenge incumbent state Senator Craig Estes for the Republican nomination in Senate District 30. Fallon defeated Estes and Nocona businessman Craig Carter in the primary on March 6, 2018, with 53,881 votes (62%). In the November 6 general election, Fallon defeated Democratic nominee Kevin Lopez with 233,949 votes (73.9%) to Lopez's 82,449 (26.1%). Fallon served on the House committees on Human Services and Technology.

=== Legislative positions ===
Fallon defended his "Merry Christmas" law in an appearance on David Barton's WallBuilders Live radio program, telling co-host Rick Green, a former member of the Texas House from Hays County in suburban Austin, that those offended by public schools hosting Christmas parties should examine their own hearts to evaluate their attitudes. Both Fallon and Green said that no citizen has a constitutional right "not to be offended". Fallon vowed to make T-shirts with a Christmas theme for pupils to wear on the day before the holiday break.

In 2013 Fallon supported Texas House Bill 2, a bill that would ban abortion after 20 weeks of gestation and require abortion providers to have admitting privileges at a nearby hospital. The measure passed the House, 96–49. These issues brought forth an unsuccessful filibuster in the Texas State Senate by Senator Wendy R. Davis. Parts of the bill were later deemed unconstitutional and struck down by the Supreme Court of the United States in Whole Woman's Health v. Hellerstedt. The Texas Right to Life Committee rated Fallon 100% favorable.

Fallon opposed the bill to establish a taxpayer-funded breakfast program for public schools; the measure passed the House, 73–58. He co-sponsored legislation to provide marshals for school security as a separate law-enforcement entity. He co-sponsored the successful bill to extend the franchise tax exemption to certain small businesses. He voted to require testing for narcotics of those individuals receiving unemployment compensation.

Fallon co-sponsored the measure to forbid the state from engaging in the enforcement of federal regulations of firearms. He co-sponsored legislation to allow college and university officials to carry concealed weapons on campus and in vehicles in the name of security. He voted to reduce the time required to obtain a concealed-carry permit. Fallon voted for term limits for certain state officials. To protect election integrity, Fallon supported legislation to forbid an individual from turning in multiple ballots.

==== Veterans ====
In the 117th Congress, Fallon opposed the House version of the PACT ACT but voted in favor of the Senate version that was signed into law and expanded VA benefits to veterans exposed to toxic chemicals during their military service.

=== Comments about LGBTQ community ===
In 2018, Fallon was criticized for his remarks about state representative Mary González, an openly pansexual woman, while delivering a speech to the local Wichita County Republican Women's group. The El Paso Times quoted Fallon:

You can't be gay anymore. It's like the whole alphabet soup now — lesbian, transgender, bisexual, questioning. There's something called pansexual."

Fallon later clarified, saying, "It was an innocent little comment about mocking the labeling, not a person."

=== Interest group ratings ===
In 2015 Fallon was named one of "The 3 Worst North Texas Legislators" by D Magazine, which wrote, "Fallon has a lawyerlike relationship with the truth" and was "vindictive, and he’ll say anything to get what he wants".

By contrast, Phyllis Schlafly's Eagle Forum, managed in Texas by Cathie Adams, a former state chairman of the Texas Republican Party and a Fallon supporter, rated Fallon 95%. The Young Conservatives of Texas scored him 92%. The Texas League of Conservation Voters rated him 25%; Environment Texas, 28%. Texans for Fiscal Responsibility rated Fallon 98%; the Texas Association of Business, 80%. The NRA Political Victory Fund rated him "A+".

== U.S. House of Representatives ==
=== Elections ===
==== 2020 ====
In May 2020, Fallon launched a campaign for Texas's 4th congressional district to replace former U.S. representative John Ratcliffe, who resigned to become Director of National Intelligence. His state senate district included much of the congressional district's eastern portion. On August 8, 2020, Fallon was selected to replace Ratcliffe on the November ballot by the 18 county Republican Party chairs and precinct chairs in the district, winning the nomination with 82 votes to his nearest opponent's 34. Fallon faced Democrat Russell Foster in the November general election. According to The Texas Tribune, the district is so heavily Republican that the county Republican chairs effectively chose Ratcliffe's successor when they chose Fallon to replace him as the Republican nominee.

As expected, Fallon won the general election in a landslide, with 75% of the vote to Foster's 22%. When he took office, he was only the sixth person to represent this district since its creation in 1903.

=== Tenure ===
On January 6, 2021, Fallon, along with 147 of his fellow congressional Republicans, voted to block certification of the results for President-elect Joe Biden's 2020 United States presidential election.

Fallon voted to include provisions for drafting women in the National Defense Authorization Act of 2022.

In March 2023, Fallon was one of 26 Republicans sitting on the House Oversight and Accountability Committee who refused to join their Democratic counterparts in signing a letter denouncing white supremacy and racist conspiracy theories.

Fallon was among the 71 Republicans who voted against final passage of the Fiscal Responsibility Act of 2023 in the House.

Fallon voted to provide Israel with support following 2023 Hamas attack on Israel.

On November 13, 2023, it was reported that Fallon had filed to run for the state senate seat he once held, opening up his congressional seat in the 2024 election. Fallon reversed course the next day, even after his potential return to the Texas Senate received an endorsement from Lieutenant Governor Dan Patrick, and announced that he would instead seek reelection to his current House seat after all.

On July 29, 2024, Fallon was announced as one of seven Republican members of a bipartisan task force investigating the attempted assassination of Donald Trump.

Fallon clashes with Rowe while testifying before Congress

On December 5, 2024, acting Secret Service director Ronald L. Rowe Jr. testified before Congress, taking responsibility for the agency’s failures and outlining corrective measures. He announced initiatives including enhanced technical assets, expanded staffing, improved retention efforts, and a new "chief wellness officer" to support mental health. These reforms aimed to address gaps in intelligence, communication, and protective protocols. Fallon criticized Rowe for not deploying additional protective units and for his absence from the rally site after the attack. Rowe refused to answer questions, emphasizing ongoing improvements and rejecting claims of politicizing his role. This eventually led to a shouting match between the two, before Pennsylvania Representative Mike Kelly ordered the two to get back in order.

=== Committee assignments ===
- Committee on Armed Services
  - Subcommittee on Military Personnel
  - Subcommittee on Cyber, Innovative Technologies and Information Systems
- United States House Committee on Oversight and Reform
  - Subcommittee on Environment

=== Caucus memberships ===
- Republican Study Committee
- Congressional Western Caucus
- Values Action Team
- Working Forests Caucus
- Congressional Taiwan Caucus
- Second Amendment Caucus
- Special Operations Forces (SOF) Caucus
- Depot Caucus
- F-35 Caucus
- Conservative Climate Caucus

=== Investigation ===
In February 2022, the Office of Congressional Ethics (OCE) board filed a report stating that there was "substantial reason to believe" that Fallon had violated a federal stock law. The House Committee on Ethics released that report on May 31, 2022, indicating that it was investigating Fallon over repeated reporting violations of the STOCK Act, enacted in 2012 to prevent insider trading using non-public information by members of Congress and other government employees. Members of Congress are required to report any stock transaction over $1,000 within 45 days. Violations are subject to a $200 fine.

The OCE report stated that during the first half of 2021, Fallon filed late reports representing as much as $17.53 million in trades. An OCE review of his record began in the fall of 2021. Reports for trades made in December 2021 again missed the required filing date. The OCE report states, "Rep. Fallon produced a limited set of documents to the OCE and declined to interview with the OCE. This non-cooperation undermined the OCE's ability to verify Rep. Fallon's overall STOCK Act compliance and to fully assess the reasons for his late filings."

Fallon initially claimed he thought that reporting was required annually, as in the Texas legislature. On March 18, 2022, one of his lawyers, Kate Belinski, sent the OCE a letter insisting that Fallon's beliefs were "a common misconception, which, coupled with the overwhelming amount of information new members and their staff receive at the beginning of their terms, often results in inadvertent late disclosures." She insisted that Fallon had cooperated by providing the documents OCE requested. But the OCE report noted Fallon's "late disclosure of reportable transactions, which continued even after he was on notice of his STOCK Act filing obligations."

=== 2024 Republican primary ===
Fallon was named as part of the Trump campaign's Texas leadership team in March.

== Personal life ==
Fallon is married to Susan Kimberly Garner; they have two sons.

During his tenure in the state senate, Fallon lived in the Denton County portion of Prosper, which was just outside the 4th's boundaries. While candidates for the House are only constitutionally required to live in the state they wish to represent, longstanding convention holds that they live either in or reasonably close to the district they wish to represent. Soon after being sworn into the House, he moved to Sherman, which is firmly in the 4th. He has since moved to Frisco, almost all of which is in the 4th as of the 2022 redistricting.

Fallon is a member of Holy Cross Catholic Church in The Colony. He is a donor to Dallas Baptist University, Frisco Family Services, and the Boys & Girls Clubs of America.

U.S. House of Representatives
| Preceded by John Ratcliffe | Member of the U.S. House of Representatives from Texas's 4th congressional district 2021–present | Incumbent |
U.S. order of precedence (ceremonial)
| Preceded by Byron Donalds | United States representatives by seniority 247th | Succeeded by Randy Feenstra |
