= Jared Patterson =

American politician (born 1983)

Member of the Texas House of Representatives from the 106th district
- Incumbent
- Assumed office January 8, 2019
- Preceded by: Pat Fallon

Personal details
- Born: Jared Lynn Patterson; April 1, 1983 (age 43)
- Party: Republican
- Education: Texas A&M University (BS)

Jared Lynn Patterson (born April 1, 1983) is an American politician from Texas. A member of the Republican Party, he was elected to the Texas House of Representatives from the 106th district in November 2018, he assumed office on January 8, 2019. An analysis of votes in the 2023 regular session found that Patterson was the most right-wing of 85 Republican members of the Texas House.

== Early life and education ==
Patterson was born on April 1, 1983. He holds a B.S. degree from Texas A&M University.

== Political career ==
=== Elections and committee assignments ===
In 2017, he filed to run for House District 106 after incumbent Pat Fallon announced his run for the Texas Senate. Patterson won 54% of the vote in the March 2018 Republican primary election, defeating Clint Bedsole, who received 46% of the vote. In the November 2018 general election, Patterson won 58.3% of the vote, defeating Democratic nominee Ramona Thompson.

In the March 2020 Republican primary, Patterson won re-nomination with 76.09% of the vote, defeating James Trombley. In the 2020 general election, he received 73,692 votes (58.51%), defeating Democratic nominee Jennifer Skidonenko. In 2022, he won reelection in an uncontested race.

In the 86th Texas Legislature (2019), Patterson was a member of the Aggregate Production Operations, Interim Study; Business & Industry; Resolutions Calendars; and Urban Affairs committees. In the 87th Texas Legislature (2021), Patterson was a member of the Business & Industry, Calendars, and Homeland Security & Public Safety committees. In the 88th Texas Legislature (2023), Patterson was a member of the Calendars, Licensing & Administrative Procedures committees. Patterson was also a deputy floor leader and the chairman of the Policy Committee for the Texas House Republican Caucus.

=== Tenure ===
During his time in office, Rep. Patterson has been an author on legislation to increase border security funding, lower property taxes, ban books and media from school libraries, support first responders, and safeguard our pets. In 2021, Patterson played a supported the passage of measures empowering Constitutional Carry of firearms and banning abortion with a heartbeat bill. In 2023, he passed HB 900, known as The READER Act, which bans Texas school libraries from stocking material deemed to be sexually explicit. When the blackletter law of the bill resulted in one school district silently removing the Bible from library shelves, he insisted that religious material, regardless of sexual content, is not only acceptable, but mandatory for schools to supply to children. Bibles were subsequently replaced in the school libraries.

== Personal life ==
Patterson lives in Frisco, Texas.
