= Texas's 68th House of Representatives district =

American legislative district

Texas's 68th State House of Representatives district
Representative
David Spiller; R–Jacksboro
- Demographics: 72.9% White; 3.3% Black; 19.7% Hispanic; 1.0% Asian
- Population (2020) • Voting age: 193,744; 150,323

The 68th district of the Texas House of Representatives contains the entirety of Shackelford, Throckmorton, and Young Counties. The current representative is David Spiller, who was first elected in 2020.
