= Texas Road =

Pioneer cattle trail from Texas to Missouri

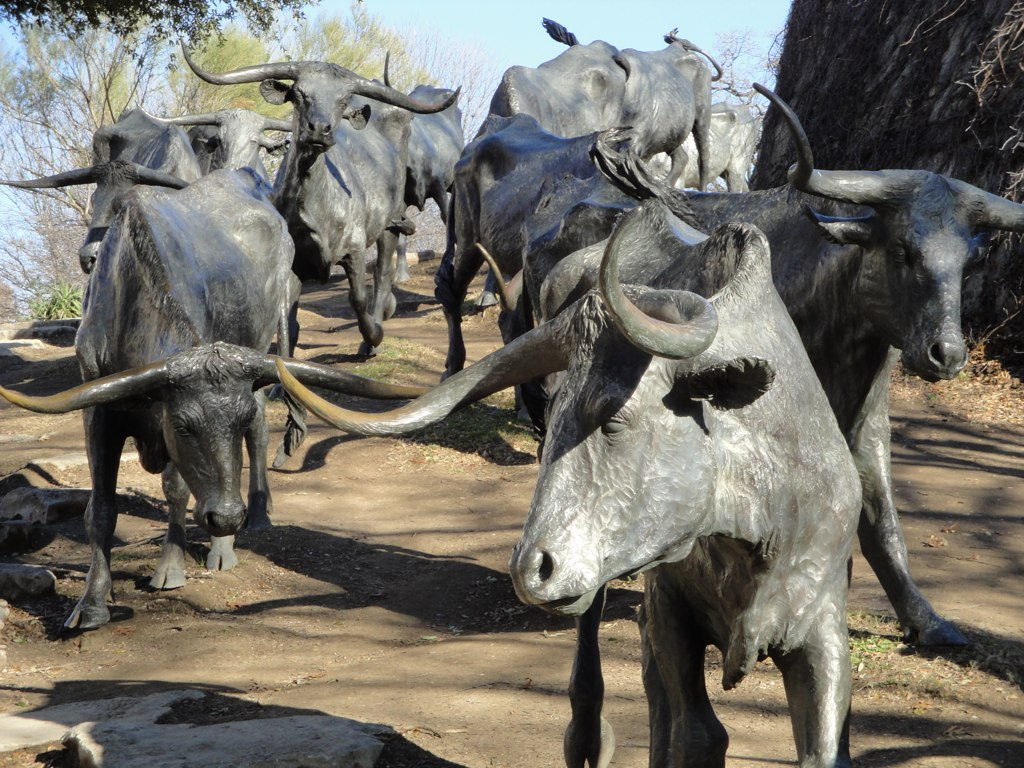
Pioneer Plaza Dallas, Downtown

The Texas Road, also known as the Shawnee Trail, or Shawnee-Arbuckle Trail, was a major trade and emigrant route to Texas across Indian Territory (later Oklahoma, Kansas, and Missouri). Established during the Mexican War by emigrants rushing to Texas, it remained an important route across Indian Territory until Oklahoma statehood. The Shawnee Trail was the earliest and easternmost route by which Texas Longhorn cattle were taken to the north. It played a significant role in the history of Texas, Oklahoma, Missouri, and Kansas in the early and mid-1800s.

According to Gary and Margaret Kraisinger, "The Texas Road, an immigration route, followed an earlier Indian trail and had existed since the early Republic-of-Texas days when northern pioneers migrated to the Republic to take advantage of the generous Spanish land-grants....trail drivers followed the Texas Road north across the Indian Nations, paused at Baxter's Place located in southeast Kansas Territory on the military road between Fort Scott, Kansas Territory, and Fort Gibson, Indian Territory, and continued across Missouri to the river towns of St. Louis and Hannibal, Missouri. By the 1850s, this route became known as the 'Shawnee Trail' and it carried thousands of longhorns northward."

== The Shawnee Trail route ==
"Of the principal routes by which Texas Longhorn cattle were taken afoot to railheads to the north, the earliest and easternmost was the Shawnee Trail. Used before and just after the Civil War, the Shawnee Trail gathered cattle from east and west of its main stem, which passed through Austin, Waco, and Dallas. It crossed the Red River at Rock Bluff, near Preston, and led north along the eastern edge of what became Oklahoma, a route later followed closely by the Missouri-Kansas-Texas Railroad. The drovers took over a trail long used by Indians in hunting and raiding and by southbound settlers from the Midwest; the latter called it the Texas Road. North of Fort Gibson, the cattle route split into terminal branches that ended in such Missouri points as St. Louis, Sedalia, Independence, Westport, and Kansas City, and in Baxter Springs and other towns in eastern Kansas. Early drovers referred to their route as the cattle trail, the Sedalia Trail, the Kansas Trail, or simply the trail. Why some began calling it the Shawnee Trail is uncertain, but the name may have been suggested by a Shawnee village on the Texas side of the Red River just below the trail crossing or by the Shawnee Hills, which the route skirted on the eastern side before crossing the Canadian River."

== History of the Trail ==
From the mid-1840s, various feeder routes along the Texas coastal plains, Rio Grande and western ranges connected into a trunk line leading into Austin onwards to Waco, Dallas, and the Preston Trail. The Texas Road crossed the Five Civilized Tribes of eastern Oklahoma, avoiding the Plains Indians to the west. As homesteaders moved west, the fear of Longhorns carrying Texas fever resulted in the Missouri legislature banning Texas cattle in 1855, forcing drovers north along the Kansas-Missouri border to Fort Scott. The 1866 drive was symptomatic of the continued obstacles drovers faced, including bandits and outlaws. The result was only 45,000 Longhorns journeyed north in 1867, versus 260,000 in 1866.

However, by 1867, the Union Pacific Eastern Division Railroad had extended its line into Junction City, Kansas. Also in 1867, Kansas legislation revised its 1861 quarantine law excluding the area of the state west of the 6th Principal Meridian. This legislation allowed Texas cattle to be driven north into Kansas, and then shipped east by railroad.

The Kansas Live Stock Company proposed a route west of the Sixth Principal Meridian from the Red River to Fort Arbuckle, then northwards into Kanas, passing between Abilene and Junction City. Yet, it was the efforts of Joseph G. McCoy that led to the development of the subsequent Chisholm Trail and Abilene Trail.

== See also ==
- Shawnee Trail (West Virginia), a portion of the Great Indian Warpath (Seneca Trail)
- http://www.redriverhistorian.com/shawneetrail.html, an online article about this trail
