= William Gordon Cooke =

Colonel William Gordon Cooke
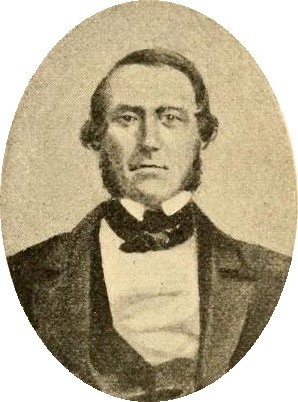
- Born: March 26, 1803; Fredericksburg, Virginia
- Died: December 24, 1847 (aged 44); Seguin, Texas
- Burial place: Texas State Cemetery, Austin, Texas
- Spouse: Ángela María de Jesús Blasa Navarro 1844
- Relatives: José Antonio Navarro
- Military career
- Allegiance: Texas Revolution; Republic of Texas; State of Texas
- Army: Texian Army; Army of the Republic of Texas; Texas Military Forces
- Service years: 1835–1836; 1836–1837, 1838–1844; 1846–1847
- Rank: Captain 1835; Major 1836; Colonel 1840
- Unit: New Orleans Grays 1835–1836
- Commands: Inspector General 1837; Quartermaster General 1838–1840; First Regiment of Infantry 1840–1841; Quartermaster General 1842–1843; Adjutant General 1843–1844; State Adjutant General 1846–1847
- Actions and expeditions: Siege of Béxar 1835; Matamoros Expedition 1836; Battle of San Jacinto 1836; Council House Fight 1840; Santa Fe Expedition 1841; Arroyo Hondo 1842 WIA; Yucatan Expedition 1843; Naval Battle of Campeche 1843

William Gordon Cooke (March 26, 1803 – December 24, 1847) was a New Orleans druggist from Virginia, who volunteered for service in the Texas Revolution; fighting at Béxar and San Jacinto, he rose to the rank of major in the Texian Army. In the Republic he held a number of military and civilian appointments; as commissioner to the Comanches he participated in the Council House Fight, and as colonel of the First Texas Infantry he became the last commanding officer of the Regular Texas Army. After its disbandment, Cooke participated in the Santa Fe Expedition and sat imprisoned in Mexico City. Back in Texas, he fought the Mexicans at Arroyo Hondo, and in the naval battles of Campeche. The last Secretary of war of the Republic, he was also the State of Texas' first Adjutant general.

== Texas Revolution ==
Cooke, a Virginian of Anglo-Irish descent, came to Texas with the New Orleans Grays in 1835. Having moved from Fredericksburg to New Orleans to take up the family business of pharmacy, he had attended a public meeting in mid-October, and volunteered for service in the Texas revolution. The company was filled within four days, and sailed from the Crescent City with four months provisions provided by its citizens. Arriving at San Antonio, where Texas forces were besieging the Mexicans in the town, Lieutenant Cooke was elected captain of the Grays. The undisciplined Texian Army was very disaffected by the many orders and counterorders received, and when General Burleson aborted an attack set to take place on December 3, dissatisfaction spread among the besiegers; the General formally resigned his command, preparations were made for retreating to Goliad, and men began to desert in droves. According to his own account, Captain Cooke persuaded about 300 men to abandon the retreat and attack the enemy. The Texas forces led by Colonel Milam and Colonel Johnson then pressed the attack which eventually took the city. Cooke led the desperate assault that took the Priest's House.

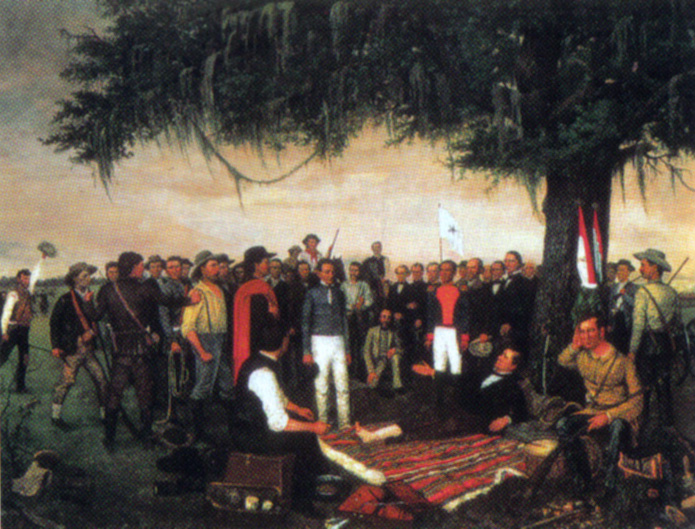
Major Cooke prevented the lynching of Santa Anna.

After the siege of Bexar, Cooke volunteered for the Matamoros Expedition as captain of the San Antonio Grays formed by those of the New Orleans Grays that did not remain in San Antonio. Arriving at Refugio they were ordered to San Patricio as reinforcements. When Colonel Grant announced his intentions to join the Mexican Federalists, Captain Cooke was ordered back to Goliad, from where he was sent with two prisoners-of-war to Washington on the Brazos. During the battle of San Jacinto, Cooke served as assistant inspector general with the rank of major on Houston's staff. After the battle, Major Cooke prevented the lynching of Santa Anna, thereby making it possible for Houston to negotiate peace and independence.

== Republic of Texas ==
Under Sam Houston's first presidency, Major Cooke briefly served as chief clerk of the Texas Department of War, and was subsequently appointed stock commissioner 1836, acting secretary of war 1836, inspector-general 1837, and quartermaster-general 1838. President Lamar appointed him commissary of subsistence 1839, one of the commissioners to sign treaties with the Comanches 1840, and as such participating in the Council House Fight in San Antonio. Later the same year, Cooke became colonel of the First Regiment of Infantry, being the last commanding officer of the regular Texas army. As such, Colonel Cooke was in charge of building the military road from Preston on the Red River to Austin, and constructing Fort Johnson near the present town of Denison.

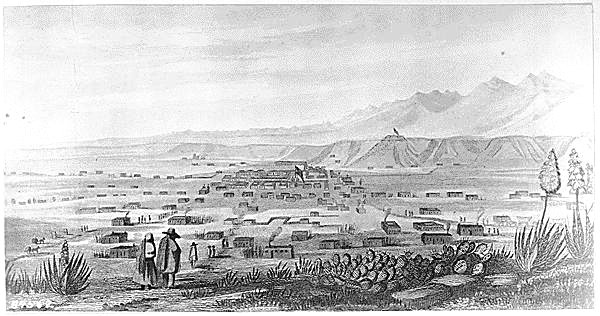
Santa Fe in the 1840s.

After the disbandment of the regular Texas army in 1841, Colonel Cooke was offered to run for vice president of the Republic, but he declined and was appointed senior civilian member of the Texan Santa Fe Expedition the same year. The aim of the expedition was to persuade those of the people of New Mexico who lived within the Texas' claims, to accept allegiance to the Republic. Almost lost and starving, the expedition made contact with the Mexican authorities when a vanguard was surrounded and taken prisoners on September 15, 1841. Two days later the main expedition was surrounded by superior forces, and Colonel Cooke surrendered. The members of the expedition were made Mexican prisoners, marched to Mexico City, and kept incarcerated. The captivity lasted until the summer of 1842, when everyone except José Antonio Navarro was set free. Colonel Cooke stayed in Mexico City recovering in the residence of the American minister Waddy Thompson Jr., before he and the American born members of the expedition were sent home courtesy of the United States Government.

Back in Texas, Colonel Cooke participated in the defeat of Mexican General Adrián Woll at Arroyo Hondo in 1842, where he was lightly wounded by a grape shot. President Houston appointed him quartermaster-general, which did not stop him from joining Edwin Ward Moore's expedition to Yucatán aboard the sloop-of-war Austin, and took part in the sea battle of Campeche 1843. After returning home the same year, Colonel Cooke was appointed adjutant-general of Texas militia. The following year, he married a niece of José Antonio Navarro, and was elected to the Texas House of Representatives. Within short, however, President Jones appointed him secretary of war (the last to hold the post).

== State of Texas ==
When the United States annexed Texas, Colonel Cooke unsuccessfully ran for the United States Congress, and was then appointed first Adjutant General of the State of Texas by Governor Henderson. However, he died already next year of tuberculosis, leaving behind a widow and a young son.
