= Bobby Crues =

American professional baseball player

Bobby Crues (December 31, 1918 – December 26, 1986) was an American professional baseball player who holds the record for most RBIs in a single season. In 1948, he drove in 254 runs for Amarillo of the West Texas-New Mexico League. The single-season major league record is 191 RBIs which Hack Wilson delivered in 1930 for the Chicago Cubs. Crues was also a pitcher who in 1940 had a record of 20-5 when he pitched 216 innings.
