= Tom Hayward (rugby league) =

Australian rugby league footballer

- Tom Heywood. 1933

Personal information
- Full name: Thomas William Hayward
- Born: 14 July 1913
- Died: 20 August 1989 (aged 76)

Playing information
- Position: Prop
Club
| Years | Team | Pld | T | G | FG | P |
|---|---|---|---|---|---|---|
| 1933–40 | St. George | 55 | 5 | 0 | 0 | 15 |
- Relatives: Percy Fairall (brother-in-law)

Thomas William Hayward (14 July 1913 – 20 August 1989) was an Australian professional rugby league footballer who played for the St. George Dragons in the 1930s and 1940s. He played as a prop.

Hayward was the brother-in-law of teammate Percy Fairall.
