= 83rd Texas Legislature =

The 83rd Texas Legislature began on January 8, 2013. All members of the House and Senate were elected in the general election held on November 6, 2012, with seats apportioned among the 2010 United States census.

== Party summary ==
=== Senate ===
Affiliation	Members	Note
Republican Party	19	
Democratic Party	12	
Total	31	

=== House of Representatives ===
Affiliation	Members	Note
Republican Party	95	
Democratic Party	55	
Total	150	

== Officers ==
=== Senate ===
- Lieutenant Governor: David Dewhurst (R)
- President Pro Tempore: Leticia Van de Putte (D)

=== House of Representatives ===
- Speaker of the House: Joe Straus (R)
- Speaker Pro Tempore: Dennis Bonnen (R)

== Members ==
=== Senate ===
Senator	Party	District	Home Town	Took office
Kevin Eltife	Republican	1	Tyler	2004
Bob Deuell	Republican	2	Greenville	2003
Robert Nichols	Republican	3	Jacksonville	2007
Tommy Williams	Republican	4	The Woodlands	2003
Charles Schwertner	Republican	5	Georgetown	2013
Sylvia Garcia	Democratic	6	Houston	2013
Dan Patrick	Republican	7	Houston	2007
Ken Paxton	Republican	8	McKinney	2013
Kelly Hancock	Republican	9	Fort Worth	2013
Wendy Davis	Democratic	10	Fort Worth	2009
Larry Taylor (politician)	Republican	11	Friendswood	2013
Jane Nelson	Republican	12	Lewisville	1993
Rodney Ellis	Democratic	13	Houston	1990
Kirk Watson	Democratic	14	Austin	2007
John Whitmire	Democratic	15	Houston	1983
John Carona	Republican	16	Dallas	1996
Joan Huffman	Republican	17	Southside Place	2008
Glenn Hegar	Republican	18	Katy	2007
Carlos I. Uresti	Democratic	19	San Antonio	2006
Juan "Chuy" Hinojosa	Democratic	20	Mission	2002
Judith Zaffirini	Democratic	21	Laredo	1987
Brian Birdwell	Republican	22	Granbury	2010
Royce West	Democratic	23	Dallas	1993
Troy Fraser	Republican	24	Horseshoe Bay	1997
Donna Campbell	Republican	25	New Braunfels	2013
Leticia Van de Putte	Democratic	26	San Antonio	1999
Eddie Lucio Jr.	Democratic	27	Brownsville	1991
Robert L. Duncan	Republican	28	Lubbock	1997
José R. Rodríguez	Democratic	29	El Paso	2011
Craig Estes	Republican	30	Wichita Falls	2001
Kel Seliger	Republican	31	Amarillo	2004

=== House of Representatives ===
Representative	Party	Home Town/City	District ↑	County
George Lavender	Republican	New Boston	1	Bowie, Franklin, Lamar, Red River
Dan Flynn	Republican	Canton	2	Hopkins, Hunt, Van Zandt
Cecil Bell Jr.	Republican	Magnolia	3	Montgomery, Waller
Lance Gooden	Republican	Athens	4	Henderson, Kaufman
Bryan Hughes	Republican	Marshall	5	Camp, Rains, Smith, Titus, Upshur, Wood
Matt Schaefer	Republican	Tyler	6	Smith
David Simpson	Republican	Longview	7	Gregg, Upshur
Byron Cook	Republican	Corsicana	8	Anderson, Freestone, Hill, Navarro
Christopher Paddie	Republican	Marshall	9	Cass, Harrison, Marion, Panola, Sabine, Shelby
Jim Pitts	Republican	Waxahachie	10	Ellis, Henderson
Travis Clardy	Republican	Nacogdoches	11	Cherokee, Nacogdoches, Rusk
Kyle Kacal	Republican	College Station	12	Brazos, Falls, Limestone, McLennan, Robertson
Lois Kolkhorst	Republican	Brenham	13	Austin, Burleson, Colorado, Fayette, Grimes, Lavaca, Washington
John N. Raney	Republican	College Station	14	Brazos
Steve Toth	Republican	The Woodlands	15	Montgomery
Brandon Creighton	Republican	Conroe	16	Montgomery
Tim Kleinschmidt	Republican	Lexington	17	Bastrop, Caldwell, Gonzales, Karnes, Lee
John Otto	Republican	Dayton	18	Liberty, San Jacinto, Walker
James E. White	Republican	Woodville	19	Hardin, Jasper, Newton, Polk, Tyler
Marsha Farney	Republican	Georgetown	20	Burnet, Milam, Williamson
Allan Ritter	Republican	Nederland	21	Jefferson, Orange
Joe Deshotel	Democratic	Port Arthur	22	Jefferson
Craig Eiland	Democratic	Galveston	23	Chambers, Galveston
Greg Bonnen	Republican	Friendswood	24	Galveston
Dennis Bonnen	Republican	Angleton	25	Brazoria, Matagorda
Rick Miller	Republican	Sugar Land	26	Fort Bend
Ron Reynolds	Democratic	Missouri City	27	Fort Bend
John Zerwas	Republican	Katy	28	Fort Bend
Ed Thompson	Republican	Pearland	29	Brazoria
Geanie Morrison	Republican	Victoria	30	Aransas, Calhoun, DeWitt, Goliad, Refugio, Victoria
Ryan Guillen	Democratic	Rio Grande	31	Atascosa, Brooks, Duval, Jim Hogg, Kenedy, La Salle, Live Oak, McMullen, Starr, Willacy
Todd Ames Hunter	Republican	Portland	32	Nueces
Scott Turner	Republican	Frisco	33	Collin
Abel Herrero	Democratic	Robstown	34	Nueces
Oscar Longoria	Democratic	Mission	35	Cameron, Hidalgo
Sergio Muñoz Jr.	Democratic	Palmview	36	Hidalgo
Rene O. Oliveira	Democratic	Brownsville	37	Cameron
Eddie Lucio, III	Democratic	San Benito	38	Cameron
Armando Martinez	Democratic	Weslaco	39	Hidalgo
Terry Canales	Democratic	Edinburg	40	Hidalgo
Robert Guerra	Democratic	Mission	41	Hidalgo
Richard Raymond	Democratic	Laredo	42	Webb
José Manuel Lozano	Republican	Kingsville	43	Bee, Jim Wells, Kleberg, San Patricio
John Kuempel	Republican	Seguin	44	Guadalupe, Wilson
Jason Isaac	Republican	Dripping Springs	45	Blanco, Hays
Dawnna Dukes	Democratic	Austin	46	Travis
Paul D. Workman	Republican	Austin	47	Travis
Donna Howard	Democratic	Austin	48	Travis
Elliott Naishtat	Democratic	Austin	49	Travis
Mark Strama	Democratic	Austin	50	Travis
Eddie Rodriguez	Democratic	Austin	51	Travis
Larry Gonzales	Republican	Round Rock	52	Williamson
Harvey Hilderbran	Republican	Kerrville	53	Bandera, Crockett, Edwards, Kerr, Kimble, Llano, Mason, Medina, Menard, Real, Schleicher, Sutton
Jimmie Don Aycock	Republican	Lampasas	54	Bell, Lampasas
Ralph Sheffield	Republican	Temple	55	Bell
Charles "Doc" Anderson	Republican	Waco	56	McLennan
Trent Ashby	Republican	Lufkin	57	Angelina, Houston, Leon, Madison, San Augustine, Trinity
Rob Orr	Republican	Burleson	58	Bosque, Johnson
J. D. Sheffield	Republican	Stephenville	59	Comanche, Coryell, Erath, Hamilton, McCulloch, Mills, San Saba, Somervell
Jim Keffer	Republican	Eastland	60	Brown, Callahan, Coleman, Eastland, Hood, Palo Pinto, Shackelford, Stephens
Phil King	Republican	Weatherford	61	Parker, Wise
Larry Phillips	Republican	Sherman	62	Delta, Fannin, Grayson
Tan Parker	Republican	Flower Mound	63	Denton
Myra Crownover	Republican	Lake Dallas	64	Denton
Ron Simmons	Republican	Carrollton	65	Denton
Van Taylor	Republican	Plano	66	Collin
Jeff Leach	Republican	Plano	67	Collin
Drew Springer Jr.	Republican	Muenster	68	Childress, Collingsworth, Cooke, Cottle, Crosby, Dickens, Fisher, Floyd, Garza, Hall, Hardeman, Haskell, Jack, Kent, King, Montague, Motley, Stonewall, Throckmorton, Wheeler, Wilbarger, Young
James Frank	Republican	Wichita Falls	69	Archer, Baylor, Clay, Foard, Knox, Wichita
Scott Sanford	Republican	McKinney	70	Collin
Susan King	Republican	Abilene	71	Jones, Nolan, Taylor
Drew Darby	Republican	San Angelo	72	Coke, Concho, Glasscock, Howard, Irion, Reagan, Runnels, Scurry, Tom Green
Doug Miller	Republican	New Braunfels	73	Comal, Gillespie, Kendall
Alfonso "Poncho" Nevarez	Democratic	Eagle Pass	74	Brewster, Culberson, Hudspeth, Jeff Davis, Kinney, Maverick, Loving, Pecos, Presidio, Reeves, Terrell, Val Verde
Mary Gonzalez	Democratic	El Paso	75	El Paso
Naomi Gonzalez	Democratic	El Paso	76	El Paso
Marisa Marquez	Democratic	El Paso	77	El Paso
Joe Moody	Democratic	El Paso	78	El Paso
Joe Pickett	Democratic	El Paso	79	El Paso
Tracy King	Democratic	Batesville	80	Dimmit, Frio, Uvalde, Webb, Zapata, Zavala
Tryon D. Lewis	Republican	Odessa	81	Andrews, Ector, Ward, Winkler
Tom Craddick	Republican	Midland	82	Crane, Dawson, Martin, Midland, Upton
Charles Perry	Republican	Lubbock	83	Borden, Gaines, Lubbock, Lynn, Mitchell, Scurry, Terry
John Frullo	Republican	Lubbock	84	Lubbock
Phil Stephenson	Republican	Wharton	85	Fort Bend, Jackson, Wharton
John T. Smithee	Republican	Amarillo	86	Dallam, Deaf Smith, Hartley, Oldham, Parmer, Randall
Four Price	Republican	Amarillo	87	Carson, Hutchinson, Moore, Potter, Sherman
Ken King	Republican	Canadian	88	Armstrong, Bailey, Briscoe, Castro, Cochran, Donley, Gray, Hale, Hansford, Hemphill, Hockley, Lamb, Lipscomb, Ochiltree, Roberts, Swisher, Yoakum
Jodie Anne Laubenberg	Republican	Parker	89	Collin
Lon Burnam	Democratic	Fort Worth	90	Tarrant
Stephanie Klick	Republican	Fort Worth	91	Tarrant
Jonathan Stickland	Republican	Bedford	92	Tarrant
Matt Krause	Republican	Fort Worth	93	Tarrant
Diane Patrick	Republican	Arlington	94	Tarrant
Nicole Collier	Democratic	Fort Worth	95	Tarrant
Bill Zedler	Republican	Arlington	96	Tarrant
Craig Goldman	Republican	Fort Worth	97	Tarrant
Giovanni Capriglione	Republican	Southlake	98	Tarrant
Charlie Geren	Republican	River Oaks	99	Tarrant
Eric Johnson	Democratic	Dallas	100	Dallas
Chris Turner	Democratic	Arlington	101	Tarrant
Stefani Carter	Republican	Dallas	102	Dallas
Rafael Anchia	Democratic	Dallas	103	Dallas
Roberto R. Alonzo	Democratic	Dallas	104	Dallas
Linda Harper-Brown	Republican	Irving	105	Dallas
Pat Fallon	Republican	Frisco	106	Denton
Kenneth Sheets	Republican	Dallas	107	Dallas
Dan Branch	Republican	Dallas	108	Dallas
Helen Giddings	Democratic	De Soto	109	Dallas
Toni Rose	Democratic	Dallas	110	Dallas
Yvonne Davis	Democratic	Dallas	111	Dallas
Angie Chen Button	Republican	Richardson	112	Dallas
Cindy Burkett	Republican	Sunnyvale	113	Dallas
Jason Villalba	Republican	Dallas	114	Dallas
Jim Jackson	Republican	Carrollton	115	Dallas
Trey Martinez Fischer	Democratic	San Antonio	116	Bexar
Philip Cortez	Democratic	San Antonio	117	Bexar
Joe Farias	Democratic	San Antonio	118	Bexar
Roland Gutierrez	Democratic	San Antonio	119	Bexar
Ruth Jones McClendon	Democratic	San Antonio	120	Bexar
Joe Straus	Republican	San Antonio	121	Bexar
Lyle Larson	Republican	San Antonio	122	Bexar
Mike Villarreal	Democratic	San Antonio	123	Bexar
José Menéndez	Democratic	San Antonio	124	Bexar
Justin Rodriguez	Democratic	San Antonio	125	Bexar
Patricia Harless	Republican	Spring	126	Harris
Dan Huberty	Republican	Kingwood	127	Harris
Wayne Smith	Republican	Baytown	128	Harris
John E. Davis	Republican	Houston	129	Harris
Allen Fletcher	Republican	Houston	130	Harris
Alma Allen	Democratic	Houston	131	Harris
William "Bill" Callegari	Republican	Houston	132	Harris
Jim Murphy	Republican	Houston	133	Harris
Sarah Davis	Republican	Houston	134	Harris
Gary Elkins	Republican	Houston	135	Harris
Tony Dale	Republican	Houston	136	Harris
Gene Wu	Democratic	Houston	137	Harris
Dwayne Bohac	Republican	Houston	138	Harris
Sylvester Turner	Democratic	Houston	139	Harris
Armando Walle	Democratic	Houston	140	Harris
Senfronia Thompson	Democratic	Houston	141	Harris
Harold V. Dutton Jr.	Democratic	Houston	142	Harris
Ana Hernandez Luna	Democratic	Houston	143	Harris
Mary Ann Perez	Democratic	Pasadena	144	Harris
Carol Alvarado	Democratic	Houston	145	Harris
Borris Miles	Democratic	Houston	146	Harris
Garnet Coleman	Democratic	Houston	147	Harris
Jessica Cristina Farrar	Democratic	Houston	148	Harris
Hubert Vo	Democratic	Houston	149	Harris
Debbie Riddle	Republican	Houston	150	Harris

== Notable legislation ==
Texas Senate Bill 5 was among the legislation passed by the eighty-third Texas Legislature and signed into law, signed by Governor Rick Perry on July 18, 2013.
