= 2008 Texas Senate election =

- November 4, 2008

16 of the 31 seats in the Texas Senate 16 seats needed for a majority
	Majority party	Minority party	Third party
Party	Republican	Democratic	Libertarian
Seats before	20	11	0
Seats won	19	12	0
Seat change	▼1	▲1	Steady
Popular vote	1,608,910	1,203,432	185,537
Percentage	53.67%	40.14%	6.19%
Swing	▼8.31%	▲10.62%	▼2.31%
- Senate results by district Republican hold Democratic hold Democratic gain No election

The 2008 Texas Senate elections took place as part of the biennial United States elections. Texas voters elected state senators in 16 State Senate districts. The winners of this election served in the 81st Texas Legislature. The elected senators served four-year terms in the Texas Senate.

== Background ==
Following the 2006 elections, the Republicans maintained effective control of the Senate with nineteen members to the Democrats' twelve, a gain of one from the previous elections. To claim control of the chamber from Republicans, the Democrats needed to gain four seats.

== Predictions ==
Source	Ranking	As of
Stateline	Safe R	October 15, 2008

== Results ==
Democrats gained one seat with the election of Wendy Davis in District 10.

=== Statewide ===
Summary of the November 4, 2008 Texas Senate election results
Party	Candidates	Votes		Seats				
Party	Candidates	No.	%	Before	Up	Won	After	+/–
Republican	11	1,608,910	53.67%	20	9	8	19	▼1
Democratic	10	1,203,432	40.14%	11	6	7	12	▲1
Libertarian	12	185,537	6.19%	0	0	0	0	Steady
Total		2,997,879	100.00%	31			31	Steady

Popular vote
Republican	53.67%
Democratic	40.14%
Libertarian	6.19%

Senate seats won
Republican	53.33%
Democratic	46.67%

=== Close races ===
District	Winner	Margin
District 10	Democratic (flip)	2.40%

== Results by district ==
Race results:

District	Democratic		Republican		Libertarian		Total		Result
District	Votes	%	Votes	%	Votes	%	Votes	%	Result
District 4	-	-	203,367	100.00%	-	-	203,367	100.00%	Republican hold
District 6	72,960	70.01%	27,751	26.63%	3,496	3.35%	104,207	100.00%	Democratic hold
District 9	100,509	43.33%	125,443	54.08%	5,991	2.58%	231,943	100.00%	Republican hold
District 10	147,832	49.92%	140,737	47.52%	7,591	2.56%	296,160	100.00%	Democratic gain
District 11	113,567	41.18%	155,772	56.49%	6,419	2.33%	275,758	100.00%	Republican hold
District 16	89,346	41.06%	122,439	56.27%	5,825	2.86%	217,610	100.00%	Republican hold
District 20	124,456	81.40%	-	-	28,429	18.60%	152,885	100.00%	Democratic hold
District 21	129,802	68.22%	55,480	29.16%	4,980	2.62%	190,262	100.00%	Democratic hold
District 23	176,451	92.40%	-	-	14,503	7.60%	190,954	100.00%	Democratic hold
District 24	-	-	197,125	85.47%	33,518	14.53%	230,643	100.00%	Republican hold
District 26	136,913	81.44%	-	-	31,194	18.56%	168,107	100.00%	Democratic hold
District 27	111,596	100.00%	-	-	-	-	111,596	100.00%	Democratic hold
District 28	-	-	179,059	88.17%	24,022	11.83%	203,081	100.00%	Republican hold
District 30	-	-	221,470	100.00%	-	-	221,470	100.00%	Republican hold
District 31	-	-	180,267	90.21%	19,569	9.79%	199,836	100.00%	Republican hold
Total	1,203,432	40.14%	1,608,910	53.67%	185,537	6.19%	2,997,879	100.00%	

There were two new members of the Senate.

District	Outgoing senator	Party	Reason
10	Kim Brimer	Republican	Defeated in general election
17	Kyle Janek	Republican	Resigned June 2, 2008

=== Notable races ===
District 10: The Democratic Party ran City Councilwoman Wendy Davis against Republican and Sunset Advisory Commission chairperson Kim Brimer. The district had been Republican-leaning, having been won by George W. Bush in 2004 and by Governor Rick Perry in 2002 and 2006. Davis won that race with 49.91% of the vote. In 2014, she was the Democratic nominee for governor to succeed Perry.

District 11: The Democrats ran former Galveston city council member Joseph Jaworski against Republican candidate Mike Jackson. The district encompasses the southeast Houston suburbs and part of Galveston County that has consistently voted for Republicans including George W. Bush in 2004, Governor Perry in 2002 and 2006, and U.S. Senator John Cornyn in 2002. Mike Jackson won that race with 56.48% of the vote.

District 17: The Incumbent Republican Kyle Janek announced he would be resigning from the State Senate effective June 2, 2008 to spend more time with his family, who had moved to Austin. A special election was called and was held concurrently with the general election. 4 Republicans and 2 Democrats ran for the unexpired term, most notably, the Republican Party's Joan Huffman, and Democratic former U.S. Representative Christopher Bell, the party's 2006 nominee for governor. Huffman and Bell advanced to a runoff, held December 16, 2008. Huffman won that race with 56% of the vote.

Texas's 17th state senate district special election
Party	Candidate	Votes	%
Democratic	Christopher Bell	85,725	38.39%
Republican	Joan Huffman	58,359	26.14%
Democratic	Stephanie E. Simmons	30,839	13.81%
Republican	Austen Furse	22,588	10.12%
Republican	Ken Sherman	16,728	7.49%
Republican	Grant Harpold	9,056	4.06%
Total votes		223,295	100.00%

Texas's 17th state senate district special election runoff
Party	Candidate	Votes	%
Republican	Joan Huffman	24,497	56.09%
Democratic	Christopher Bell	19,176	43.91%
Total votes		43,673	100.00%
Republican hold			

District 21: Democratic candidate Judith Zaffirini prevailed in her historically Democratic state Senate seat, which includes Laredo. The seat was held from 1967 to 1973 by her mentor, Wayne Connally, a younger brother of John Connally. Republicans fielded former Webb County administrative judge Louis Henry Bruni (born 1949), who switched parties in December 2007 to run against Zaffirini. The district voted for George W. Bush in 2004 and Kay Bailey Hutchison in 2006 but for Democratic gubernatorial candidate Chris Bell in 2006.
