= Royce West =

American politician

- West in 2025

President pro tempore of the Texas Senate
- In office April 17, 2006 – January 9, 2007
- Preceded by: Frank L. Madla
- Succeeded by: Mario Gallegos Jr.

Member of the Texas Senate from the 23rd district
- Incumbent
- Assumed office January 12, 1993
- Preceded by: Eddie Bernice Johnson

Personal details
- Born: Royce Barry West; September 26, 1952 (age 73) Annapolis, Maryland, U.S.
- Party: Democratic
- Spouse: Carol
- Education: University of Texas at Arlington (BA, MA); University of Houston (JD)
- Website: Office website Campaign website

Royce Barry West (born September 26, 1952) is an American politician who serves as a member of the Texas Senate, representing the Dallas-based 23rd District.

== Early life and education ==
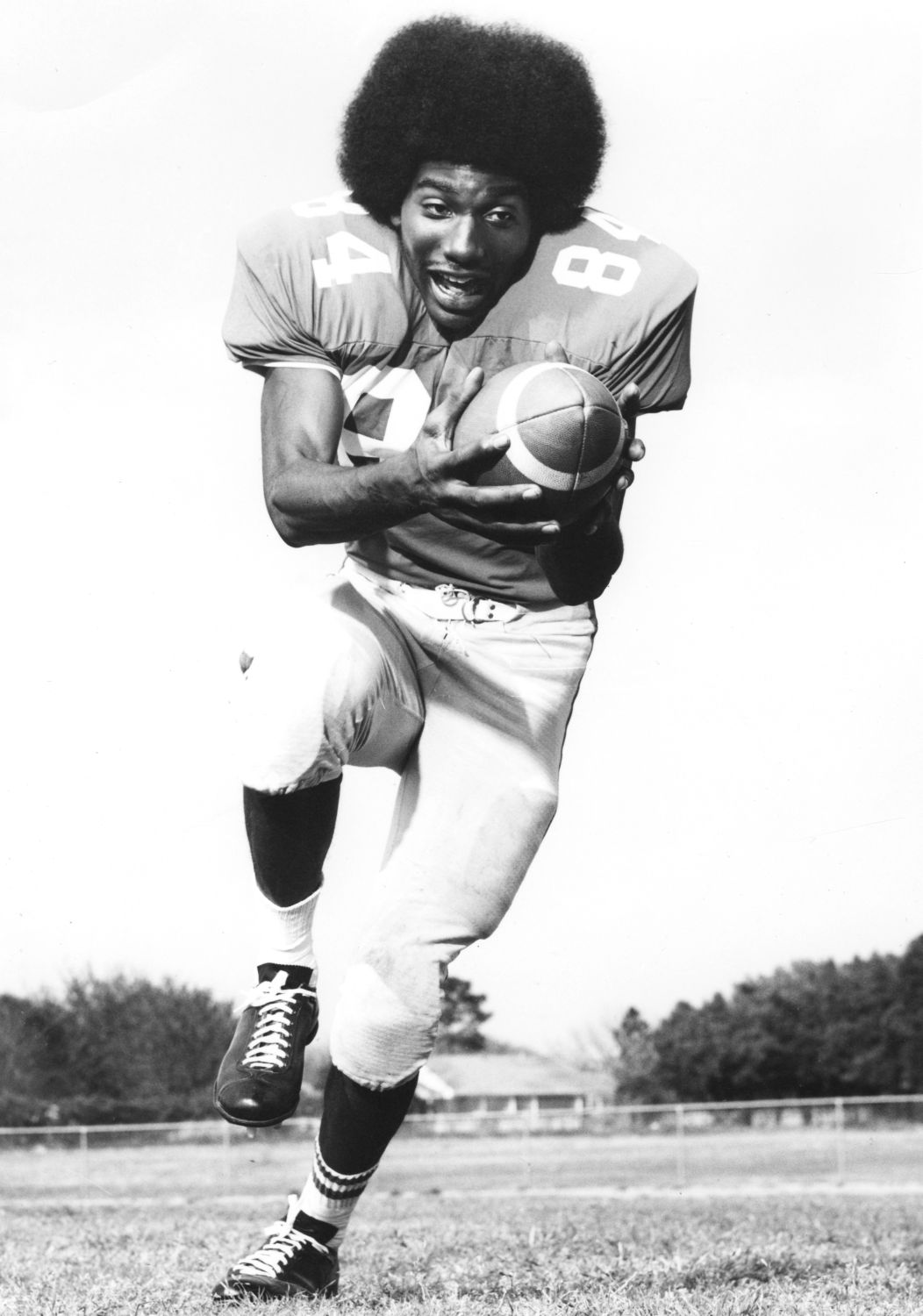
Royce West on the Texas–Arlington Mavericks football team, circa 1971–72

West was born in Annapolis, Maryland. He earned a Bachelor of Arts and Master of Arts in sociology from the University of Texas at Arlington. As an undergraduate, he was initiated into the Omega Psi Phi fraternity. West then earned a Juris Doctor from the University of Houston Law Center.

== Career ==
=== Politics ===
In 1986, West ran his first campaign for public office, losing his bid for Dallas County district attorney. His first successful political campaign was in 1992, when he ran for the Texas Senate, District 23 seat after the incumbent, Eddie Bernice Johnson, was elected to the U.S. House of Representatives. From April 2006 to January 2007, West served as president pro tempore of the Texas Senate. On November 18, 2006, West was Governor for a Day, a ceremonial title that honors the service of the president pro tempore.

On July 22, 2019, West announced his candidacy for the United States Senate in the 2020 election for the seat held by John Cornyn. He finished second in the March 3 primary, but lost the July 14 runoff to M. J. Hegar.

West (left) speaks with Massachusetts Gov. Maura Healey at the Massachusetts State House during the 2025 Texas walkout

=== Legal career ===
In addition to serving in the Texas Senate, West is a managing partner at the law firm West & Associates L.L.P. Part of his practice involves providing bond counsel and other legal services for public entities such as Dallas Independent School District, the city of Dallas, and Dallas Area Rapid Transit. West's legal services have led to concerns over possible ethics violations in his Senate work due to a conflict of interest.

== Electoral history ==
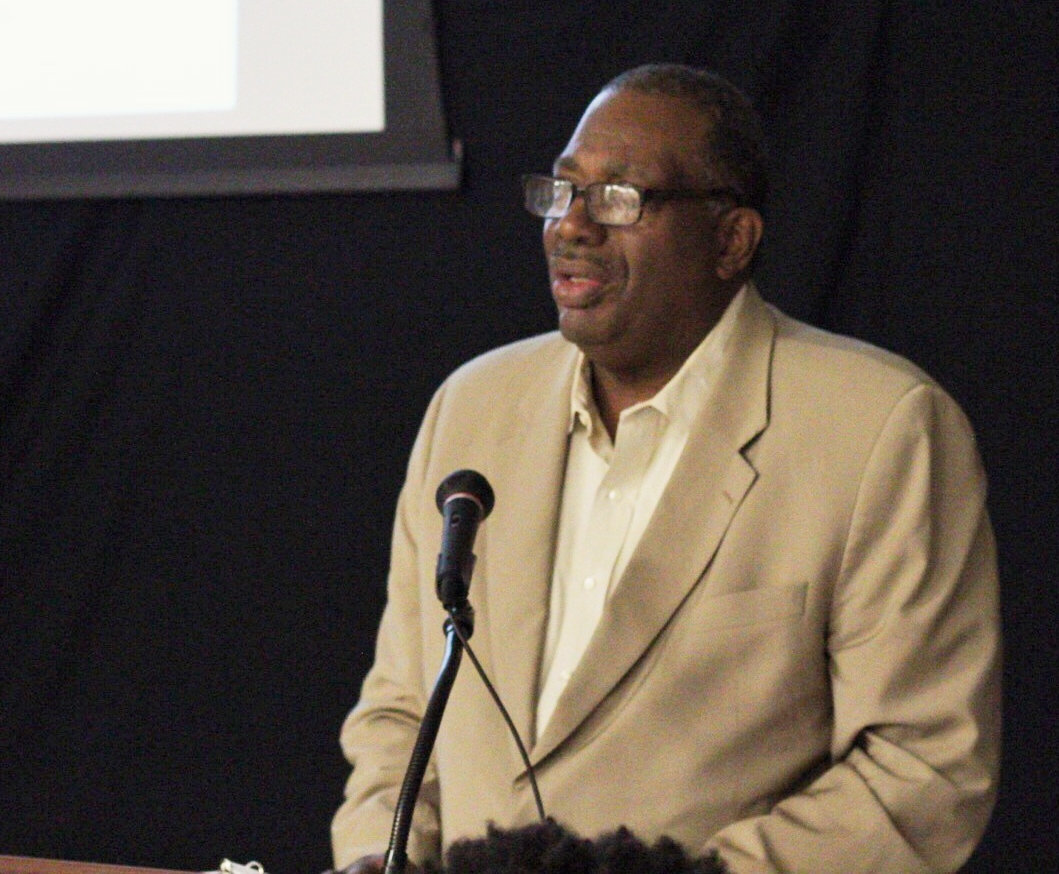
West giving a speech in 2018

=== 2018 ===
Texas general election, 2018: Senate District 23
| Party | Candidate | Votes | % | ±% |
|---|---|---|---|---|
| Democratic | Royce West (Incumbent) | 192,148 | 100.00 | |
| Majority | | 192,148 | 100.00 | |
| Turnout | | 192,148 | | |
| Democratic hold | | | | |

=== 2014 ===
Texas general election, 2014: Senate District 23
| Party | Candidate | Votes | % | ±% |
|---|---|---|---|---|
| Democratic | Royce West (Incumbent) | 99,102 | 79.39 | |
| Republican | John Lawson | 23,520 | 18.84 | |
| Libertarian | Jonathan Erhardt | 2,204 | 1.77 | |
| Majority | | 25,724 | 20.61 | |
| Turnout | | 124,826 | | |
| Democratic hold | | | | |

=== 2012 ===
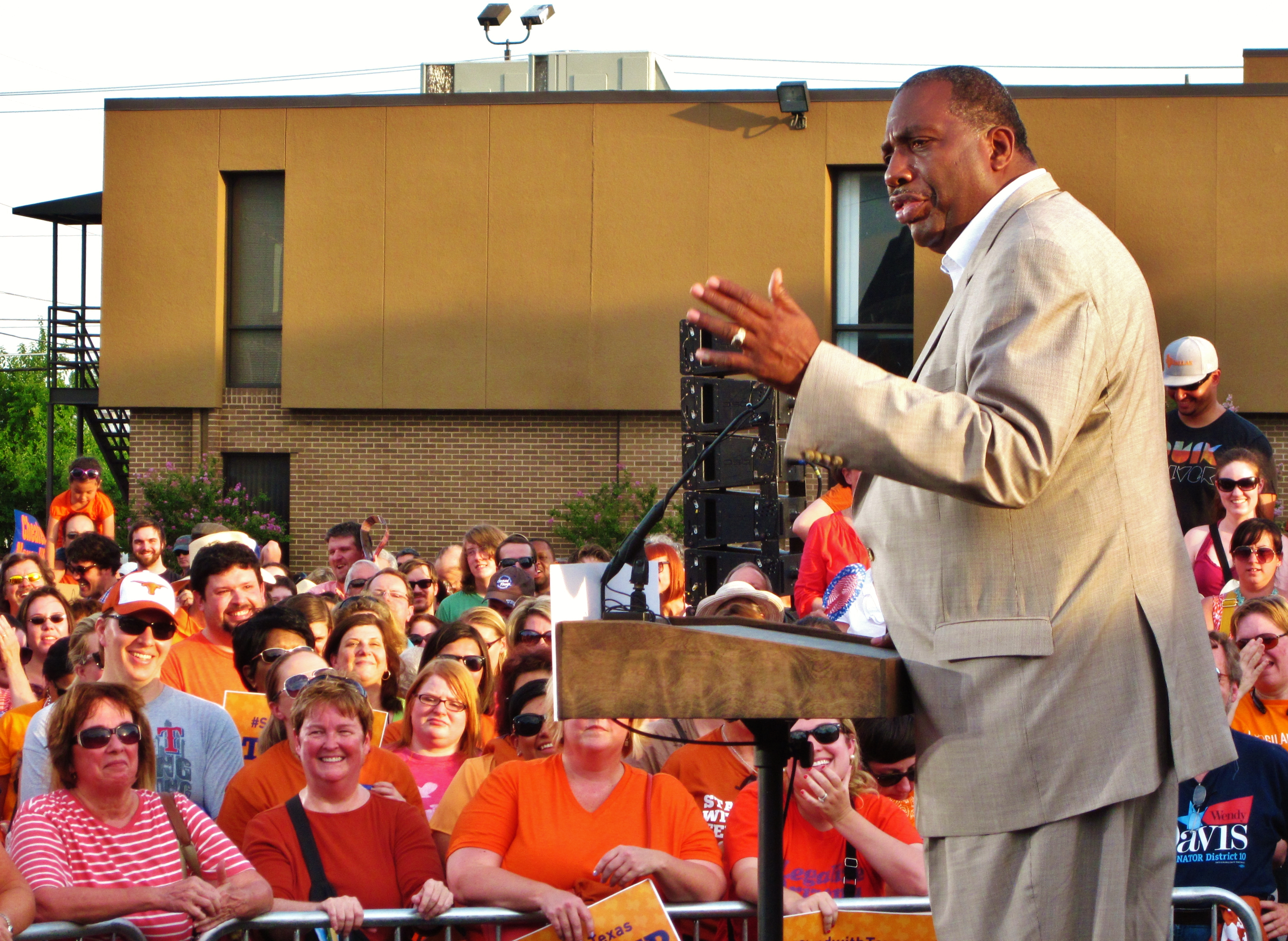
West speaking at a pro-choice rally in 2013

Texas general election, 2012: Senate District 23
| Party | Candidate | Votes | % | ±% |
|---|---|---|---|---|
| Democratic | Royce West (Incumbent) | 187,407 | 81.90 | |
| Republican | John Lawson | 41,429 | 18.10 | |
| Majority | | 145,978 | 63.80 | |
| Turnout | | 228,836 | | |
| Democratic hold | | | | |

=== 2008 ===
Texas general election, 2008: Senate District 23
| Party | Candidate | Votes | % | ±% |
|---|---|---|---|---|
| Democratic | Royce West (Incumbent) | 176,451 | 92.40 | |
| Libertarian | Jim Renfro | 14,503 | 7.60 | |
| Majority | | 161,948 | 84.81 | |
| Turnout | | 190,954 | | |
| Democratic hold | | | | |

=== 2004 ===
Texas general election, 2004: Senate District 23
| Party | Candidate | Votes | % | ±% |
|---|---|---|---|---|
| Democratic | Royce West (Incumbent) | 150,244 | 100.00 | 0.00 |
| Majority | | 150,244 | 100.00 | 0.00 |
| Turnout | | 150,244 | | +47.60 |
| Democratic hold | | | | |

=== 2002 ===
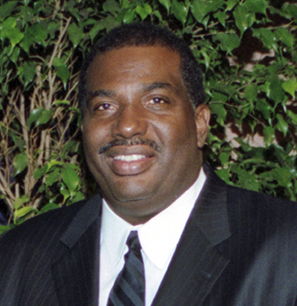
West at the University of Texas at Arlington in 2001

Texas general election, 2002: Senate District 23
| Party | Candidate | Votes | % | ±% |
|---|---|---|---|---|
| Democratic | Royce West (Incumbent) | 101,793 | 100.00 | 0.00 |
| Majority | | 101,793 | 100.00 | 0.00 |
| Turnout | | 101,793 | | +65.02 |
| Democratic hold | | | | |

=== 1998 ===
Texas general election, 1998: Senate District 23
| Party | Candidate | Votes | % | ±% |
|---|---|---|---|---|
| Democratic | Royce West (Incumbent) | 61,685 | 100.00 | 0.00 |
| Majority | | 61,685 | 100.00 | 0.00 |
| Turnout | | 61,685 | | −22.07 |
| Democratic hold | | | | |

=== 1994 ===
Texas general election, 1994: Senate District 23
| Party | Candidate | Votes | % | ±% |
|---|---|---|---|---|
| Democratic | Royce West (Incumbent) | 79,157 | 100.00 | +10.54 |
| Majority | | 79,157 | 100.00 | +21.09 |
| Turnout | | 79,157 | | −36.12 |
| Democratic hold | | | | |

=== 1992 ===
Texas general election, 1992: Senate District 23
| Party | Candidate | Votes | % | ±% |
|---|---|---|---|---|
| Democratic | Royce West | 110,856 | 89.46 | |
| Libertarian | Henry Burden | 13,066 | 10.54 | |
| Majority | | 97,790 | 78.91 | |
| Turnout | | 123,922 | | |
| Democratic hold | | | | |

Democratic primary, 1992: Senate District 23
| Candidate | | Votes | % | ± |
|---|---|---|---|---|
| | Jerald Larry | 5,963 | 13.88 | |
| | Jesse Oliver | 12,240 | 28.49 | |
| ✓ | Royce West | 24,764 | 57.63 | |
| Majority | | 12,524 | 29.15 | |
| Turnout | | 42,967 | | |

Texas Senate
| Preceded by Eddie Bernice Johnson | Member of the Texas Senate from the 23rd district 1993–present | Incumbent |
| Preceded by Frank L. Madla | President pro tempore of the Texas Senate; 2006–2007 | Succeeded by Mario Gallegos Jr. |
