= Bill Meier =

American retired politician and jurist

- Meier in 1974 political advertisement

Texas Second District Court of Appeals Place 2
- In office January 1, 2009 – December 31, 2018
- Preceded by: Dixon W. Holman
- Succeeded by: Dana Womack

Member of the Texas Senate from the 10th district
- In office January 9, 1973 – January 11, 1983
- Preceded by: Don Kennard
- Succeeded by: Bob McFarland

Personal details
- Born: August 1, 1940 (age 86) Waco, Texas, US
- Party: Democratic (1973–1981); Republican (1981–present)

William Carl Meier (born August 1, 1940) is an American retired politician and jurist who served in the Texas Senate from 1973 to 1983 and as a justice of the Second Court of Appeals of Texas from 2009 to 2018. He unsuccessfully ran for Texas attorney general in 1982. Meier's 43-hour filibuster in 1977 is the longest on record by a legislator in U.S. history.

== Early life and education ==
Meier was born in Waco, Texas. He graduated from Tarleton State Junior College in 1961, and earned his undergraduate and law degrees from the University of Texas at Austin.

== Texas Senate ==
Meier represented District 10 (part of Tarrant County) in the Texas Senate from 1973 to 1983. Originally elected as a Democrat, Meier switched to the Republican Party on June 11, 1981.

On May 2, 1977, Meier began a filibuster that remains the longest ever recorded by a member of a U.S. state legislature or the United States Congress. The bill, by Senator Ray Farabee, would have prevented public disclosure of claims filed with the Industrial Accident Board. The filibuster began at 3:20 p.m. on May 2 and concluded 43 hours later, at 10:20 a.m. on May 4. Meier remained standing for the duration of his filibuster (as required by Senate rules) and wore a waste bag under his clothes to avoid frequently needing to leave the Senate floor. To consume time, he read from over 200 legal cases about the right to privacy. After his filibuster, the bill passed the Senate 23–7 and became law. However, Meier credits his filibuster with inviting greater scrutiny of workers' compensation in Texas and helping bring about the eventual replacement of the Industrial Accident Board with the Texas Workforce Commission. The New York Times compared Meier's filibuster with Senator Wendy Davis's filibuster of abortion legislation decades later; both senators represented portions of Tarrant County and occupied the same desk on the Senate floor.

Meier was appointed chair of the Sunset Advisory Commission for its first two-year review cycle after it was established in 1977.

After his freshman regular session in 1973, Meier was named to Texas Monthly's list of the session's ten best legislators, with the magazine calling him one of the Senate's "best-informed and best-intentioned members". After the 1979 regular session, the magazine chose him as one of the session's ten worst legislators, criticizing his legislative agenda as "so anti-consumer it did everything but make caveat emptor the eleventh commandment".

Meier was the Republican nominee in the 1982 Texas attorney general election, losing to Democratic nominee Jim Mattox.

== Second Court of Appeals ==
In 2008, Meier was elected to an open seat on Texas's Second Court of Appeals. He took office in 2009 and served until his retirement in 2018.

Texas Senate
Preceded by Don Kennard	Texas State Senator from District 10 (Fort Worth); 1973–1983	Succeeded by Bob McFarland
