= Michelle Williams (politician) =

American politician

Member-elect of the Texas House of Representatives from the 127th district
- Assuming office January 2027
- Succeeding: Charles Cunningham

Personal details
- Party: Democratic
- Occupation: Teacher

Michelle Williams is an American politician. A member of the Democratic Party, she is the member-elect for the 127th district of the Texas House of Representatives.

Williams was the president of the Houston Education Association teachers' union.

After the Texas Education Agency (TEA) took over the Houston Independent School District, the TEA fired Williams over the recommendation of an independent examiner. TEA claimed that Williams refused to teach their revised syllabus; Williams — in a lawsuit asking to be reinstated — has claimed that she was fired as retaliation for her criticism of TEA and Mike Miles.

== Electoral history ==
2026 Texas House of Representatives election: District 127
Party	Candidate	Votes	%	±%
Democratic	Michelle Williams	40,743	51.18%	
Republican	Charles Cunningham (incumbent)	38,871	48.82%	
