= Ebony Turner =

American politician

Member-elect of the Texas House of Representatives from the 96th district
- Assuming office January 2027
- Succeeding: David Cook

Personal details
- Party: Democratic

Ebony Turner is an American politician. A member of the Democratic Party, she is the member-elect for the 96th district of the Texas House of Representatives.
