= Frederick Frazier =

American politician

Member of the Texas House of Representatives from the 61st district
- In office January 10, 2023 – January 14, 2025
- Preceded by: Phil King
- Succeeded by: Keresa Richardson

Personal details
- Party: Republican

Frederick Frazier is an American politician and former police officer. He was the former Republican member of the Texas House of Representatives from District 61, serving from 2023 to 2025.

== Election history ==
In 2022, Frazier ran for the Texas House of Representatives. He defeated Paul Chabot in the Republican primary with 63.9% of the vote. On November 8, 2022, he defeated Democrat Sheena King with 58.3% of the vote. He assumed office on January 10, 2023.

In 2024, Frazier ran for re-election to the Texas House of Representatives. He was defeated by Keresa Richardson in the Republican primary, winning only 32.4% of the vote. He left office on January 14, 2025, and was succeeded by Keresa Richardson.

== Controversy ==
During his 2022 campaign trail, Frazier was endorsed by former president Donald Trump and was charged with impersonating a public servant. Frazier was an active member of the Dallas Police Department until submitting his resignation in December 2023, the timing of which seems likely prompted by the criminal proceedings around an incident in 2022 involving tampering with the campaign signage of Frazier's primary opponent, Paul Chabot, and for which Frazier received the aforementioned charges of impersonating a public servant.
