= Texas's 127th House of Representatives district =

American legislative district

Texas's 127th State House of Representatives district
Representative
Charles Cunningham; R–Houston
- Demographics: 47.2% White; 19.3% Black; 27.7% Hispanic; 4.4% Asian
- Population (2020) • Voting age: 202,964; 147,142

The 127th district of the Texas House of Representatives contains parts of Harris County. The current representative is Charles Cunningham, who was first elected in 2022.

In the 2026 Texas House of Representatives election, the 127th district elected Michelle Williams (politician), a Democrat.

== List of representatives ==
- Dan Huberty from 2010 to 2022
