= Mike Jackson (Texas politician) =

American politician (born 1953)

James Michael "Mike" Jackson

Member of the Texas Senate from the 11th district
- In office 1999–2013
- Preceded by: Jerry E. Patterson
- Succeeded by: Larry Taylor

Member of the Texas House of Representatives from the 129th district
- In office 1989–1999
- Preceded by: Ed R. Watson
- Succeeded by: John E. Davis

Personal details
- Born: August 20, 1953 (age 73) Baton Rouge, Louisiana
- Party: Republican
- Spouse: Vickie
- Children: 2
- Education: Louisiana Tech University; Louisiana State University
- Occupation: President, Industrial Construction Company
- Profession: Contractor

James Michael Jackson, known as Mike Jackson (born 20 August 1953) is a Republican former member of the Texas Senate representing the 11th District. He was also the President pro tempore of the Texas Senate, before running the United States House of Representatives in 2012. In this capacity, he was an acting governor of Texas while Governor Rick Perry campaigned for U.S. President and Lieutenant Governor David Dewhurst was on holiday or campaigned for Perry.

== Education ==
Jackson attended Louisiana State University in Baton Rouge and Louisiana Tech University in Ruston.

== Political experience ==
Jackson has had the following political experience:

- Candidate, United States House of Representatives of Texas' 36th congressional district, 2012
- Texas State Senator, 1999–2013
- Texas State Representative, 1989–1999

== Most recent legislative committees ==
Jackson has been a member of the following committees:

- Agriculture and Rural Affairs
- Business and Commerce
- Committee of the Whole Senate
- Economic Development (chair)
- Natural Resources
- State Affairs

== Caucuses/Non-Legislative committees ==
Mike Jackson was a member of the following committees:

- Member, Deer Park Community Advisory Council
- Texas Delegate, Energy Council
- Member, Environment Committee
- Member, La Porte Mayor's Advisory Committee
- Member, Lottery Commission
- Member, Redistricting and Elections Committee
- Member, Sunset Advisory Commission
- Co-chair, Texas Conservative Coalition's Task Force on Transportation
- Member, Texas Windstorm Insurance Legislative Oversight Board
- Workers Compensation Commission

== Professional experience ==
Mike Jackson has had the following professional experience:

- President, Force Corporation
- Industrial Construction and Maintenance

== Election history ==
Senate election history of Jackson.

=== Most recent election ===
==== 2004 ====
Texas general election, 2004: Senate District 11
Party	Candidate	Votes	%	±%
Republican	Mike Jackson (Incumbent)	177,554	100.00	+13.70
Majority		177,554	100.00	+27.40
Turnout		177,554		+48.47
Republican hold				

=== Previous elections ===
==== 2002 ====
Texas general election, 2002: Senate District 11
Party	Candidate	Votes	%	±%
Republican	Mike Jackson (Incumbent)	103,204	86.30	+29.20
Libertarian	Michael Rubin	16,384	13.70	+13.70
Majority		86,820	72.60	+58.39
Turnout		119,588		+7.55
Republican hold				

==== 1998 ====
Texas general election, 1998: Senate District 11
Party	Candidate	Votes	%	±%
Republican	Mike Jackson	63,492	57.10	+1.50
Democratic	Edward Wesley	47,696	42.90	−1.50
Majority		15,796	14.21	+3.00
Turnout		111,188		−16.40
Republican hold				

Texas House of Representatives
Preceded by Ed R. Watson	Member of the Texas House of Representatives from District 129 (La Porte); 1989–1999	Succeeded by John E. Davis
Texas Senate
Preceded by Jerry E. Patterson	Texas State Senator from District 11 (La Porte)^{(1)} 1999-2013	Succeeded by Larry Taylor
Notes and references
1. For the 76th and 77th Legislatures, Jackson’s home city was Shoreacres.
