= Dennis Paul =

American engineer and politician

Member-elect of the Texas Senate from the 11th district
- Assuming office January 2027
- Succeeding: Mayes Middleton

Member of the Texas House of Representatives from the 129th district
- Incumbent
- Assumed office January 13, 2015
- Preceded by: John E. Davis
- Succeeded by: Scott Bowen (elect)

Personal details
- Born: Houston, Texas, U.S.
- Party: Republican
- Spouse: Eliza Paul
- Children: 1
- Education: San Jacinto College; University of Houston
- Occupation: Engineer
- Website: dennispaul.com

Dennis Paul is an American engineer and politician. He serves as a Republican member for the 129th district of the Texas House of Representatives.

Paul was born in Houston, Texas. He attended San Jacinto College and the University of Houston, earning his bachelor's degree and his master of science in engineering. He established his first business in 2002. He and his family takes part at the St. Bernadette Catholic Church.
