= Keresa Richardson =

American politician

Member of the Texas House of Representatives from the 61st district
- Incumbent
- Assumed office January 14, 2025
- Preceded by: Frederick Frazier

Personal details
- Born: Denison, Texas, U.S.
- Party: Republican
- Website: Campaign website

Keresa Richardson is an American politician who is a member of the Texas House of Representatives for the 61st district. A member of the Republican Party, she defeated in the Republican primary former representative for the 61st district Frederick Frazier. Richardson is a businesswoman from McKinney, Texas.
