= David Cook (Texas politician) =

Texas legislator (born 1971)

Member-elect of the Texas Senate from the 22nd district
- Assuming office January 2027
- Succeeding: Brian Birdwell

Member of the Texas House of Representatives from the 96th district
- Incumbent
- Assumed office January 12, 2021
- Preceded by: Bill Zedler
- Succeeded by: Ebony Turner (elect)

Mayor of Mansfield
- In office May 2008 – January 2021
- Preceded by: Barton Scott
- Succeeded by: Michael Evans

Personal details
- Born: July 5, 1971 (age 55)
- Party: Republican
- Spouse: Tonya
- Children: 4
- Education: Stephen F. Austin State University (BA); Texas Wesleyan University (JD)

David Cook (born July 5, 1971) is an American politician serving as a member of the Texas House of Representatives from the 96th district. Cook was first elected in November 2020 and assumed office in January 2021. He is a member of the Republican Party and was the mayor of Mansfield, Texas, from May 2008 to January 2021.

== Early life and education ==
Cook is a graduate of Mansfield High School, Stephen F. Austin State University, and Texas Wesleyan University School of Law. In 1993, while attending Austin University, he became a legislative aide to Democratic State Rep. Jerry Johnson of the 9th district. Later in the mid-1990s, he became an aid to state senator Chris Harris and worked in Harris's law firm.

== Career ==
Cook then became a partner with Harris in January 2004, and later a managing partner of the firm. Cook was elected mayor of Mansfield in May 2008, a position he held for 12 years.

He announced his resignation as mayor of Mansfield in December 2019 to run against Republican Bill Zedler for the 96th district seat in the Texas House of Representatives. Zedler later bowed out of the race, citing health concerns, and Cook went on to win the seat in 2020.

During his first session in the Texas House, Cook filed 10 bills, including passing his first law which made it easier to modify child support. During his second term, in 2023, he was named vice chair of the Criminal Jurisprudence Committee and became a member of the Calendars Committee. He also filed 69 bills, 14 of which passed. He also voted for the impeachment of Ken Paxton and against a measure that would remove school vouchers.

Cook received the Texas House Republican Caucus endorsement for Speaker of the House in 2024, to replace Speaker Dade Phelan who had announced he would not seek re-election. He was defeated by Dustin Burrows in the second round of voting.

Texas House of Representatives
Preceded by Bill Zedler	Member of the Texas House of Representatives from the 96th district 2021–present	Incumbent
