= 1982 Texas attorney general election =

1982 Texas Attorney General election
- November 2, 1982
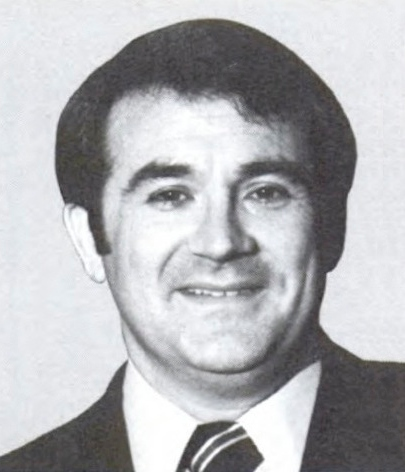

Nominee	Jim Mattox	Bill Meier
Party	Democratic	Republican
Popular vote	1,803,626	1,219,516
Percentage	58.31%	39.42%
- County results Mattox: 50–60% 60–70% 70–80% 80–90% >90% Meier: 50–60% 60–70%
Attorney General before election
Mark White
Democratic
Elected Attorney General
Jim Mattox
Democratic

An election took place on November 2, 1982, to elect the Texas attorney general. Democratic nominee Jim Mattox defeated Republican nominee Bill Meier.

== Democratic primary ==
The incumbent Attorney General Mark White chose to run for governor instead of reelection.

=== Candidates ===
==== Nominee ====
- Jim Mattox, U.S. Representative from Dallas

==== Elimenated in primary ====
- John H. Hannah Jr., United States Attorney for the Eastern District of Texas, former state representative
- Max Sherman, former state senator
- Jack Ogg, state senator

=== Results ===
Democratic primary, May 1, 1982
Party	Candidate	Votes	%
Democratic	Jim Mattox	438,687	36.6%
Democratic	John Hannah	357,695	29.8%
Democratic	Max Sherman	252,841	21.1%
Democratic	Jack Ogg	150,818	12.6%
Total votes		1,200,041	100.0%

Democratic primary runoff, June 5, 1982
Party	Candidate	Votes	%
Democratic	Jim Mattox	295,370	51.5%
Democratic	John Hannah	278,664	48.5%
Total votes		574,034	100.0%

== Republican primary ==
=== Candidates ===
==== Nominee ====
- William "Bill" Meier, state senator (Note: Meier had been elected to the state senate as a Democrat, but had swapped to the Republican Party in June 1981.)

=== Results ===
Republican primary, May 1, 1982
Party	Candidate	Votes	%
Republican	Bill Meier	198,848	100.0%
Total votes		198,848	100.0%

== General election ==
=== Results ===
November 2, 1982 Texas Attorney General election
Party	Candidate	Votes	%
Democratic	Jim Mattox	1,803,626	58.31%
Republican	Bill Meier	1,219,516	39.42%
Libertarian	Kathie Glass	70,234	2.30%
Write-in		56	0.00%
Total votes		3,093,432	100.00%
Democratic hold			
