= Scott Bowen (politician) =

American politician

Member-elect of the Texas House of Representatives from the 129th district
- Assuming office January 2027
- Succeeding: Dennis Paul

Personal details
- Party: Republican
- Website: Campaign website

Scott Bowen is an American politician. A member of the Republican Party, he is the member-elect for the 129th district of the Texas House of Representatives. He succeeded Dennis Paul at the 2026 election.
