= Sunset Advisory Commission =

Agency of the Texas Legislature

- Formation: 1977
- Type: Legislative commission
- Headquarters: 1501 N. Congress Ave, 6th Floor; Austin, Texas 78701
- Region served: State of Texas
- Main organ: Commission of 10 state legislators & two members of the public
- Website: www.sunset.texas.gov

The Sunset Advisory Commission is an agency of the Texas Legislature that evaluates state agencies and makes recommendations to the legislature on the need for, performance of, and improvements to agencies under review. The commission is headquartered in the Robert E. Johnson State Office Building in Austin.

As of the 88th Legislative session in 2023, the commission has successfully recommended abolishing 95 state agencies, of which 42 agencies were completely abolished, while another 53 were abolished with certain functions consolidated or transferred to existing or newly created agencies.

== History ==
Between 1976 and 1982, all fifty state legislatures, as well as the United States Congress, considered legislation to establish a sunset review process. Colorado was the first state to require periodic review of state agencies, which is now conducted by the Office of Policy, Research and Regulatory Reform within the Colorado Department of Regulatory Agencies.

The Texas Sunset Advisory Commission was created in 1977 by enactment of the Texas Sunset Act (now codified as Chapter 325 of the Texas Government Code), whose author was State Senator Lloyd Doggett. The originally proposed bill would have subjected 66 agencies to periodic review, but by the time the bill was enacted it included 177 agencies.

For its first review cycle, in anticipation of the 1979 regular session of the 66th Texas Legislature, the commission consisted of four members of the Texas Senate and four members of the Texas House of Representatives, with Senator Bill Meier as chairman. The commission reviewed 26 state agencies and recommended that seven be abolished.

== Composition ==
The commission has 12 members: 10 legislators and two public members. The leader of each chamber (the Speaker of the Texas House of Representatives and the Lieutenant Governor of Texas, who presides over the Texas Senate) appoints five legislators from their respective chamber and one public (non-legislator) member. The legislators serve staggered four-year terms and the public members serve two-year terms, expiring September 1 of odd-numbered years. The chair and vice-chair rotate biennially between the two chambers. The commission appoints an executive director who hires staff to carry out the agency's duties.

As of October 3, 2026, the members of the commission are:

Position	Name	Party	Took office	Term expires
Chair	Lois Kolkhorst	Republican	September 1, 2025	September 1, 2029
Vice chair	Lacey Hull	Republican	September 1, 2025	September 1, 2029
Senate member	Cesar Blanco	Democratic	September 1, 2023	September 1, 2027
Senate member	Donna Campbell	Republican	September 1, 2025	September 1, 2029
Senate member	Bryan Hughes	Republican	September 1, 2025	September 1, 2029
Senate member	Kevin Sparks	Republican	September 1, 2023	September 1, 2027
Senate member	Stacey Combest	Public member	September 1, 2025	September 1, 2027
House member	Charles Cunningham	Republican	September 1, 2025	September 1, 2027
House member	Donna Howard	Democratic	September 1, 2025	September 1, 2029
House member	Angelia Orr	Republican	September 1, 2025	September 1, 2029
House member	Matt Shaheen	Republican	September 1, 2023	September 1, 2027
House member	Mont McClendon	Public member	September 1, 2025	September 1, 2027

== Duties ==
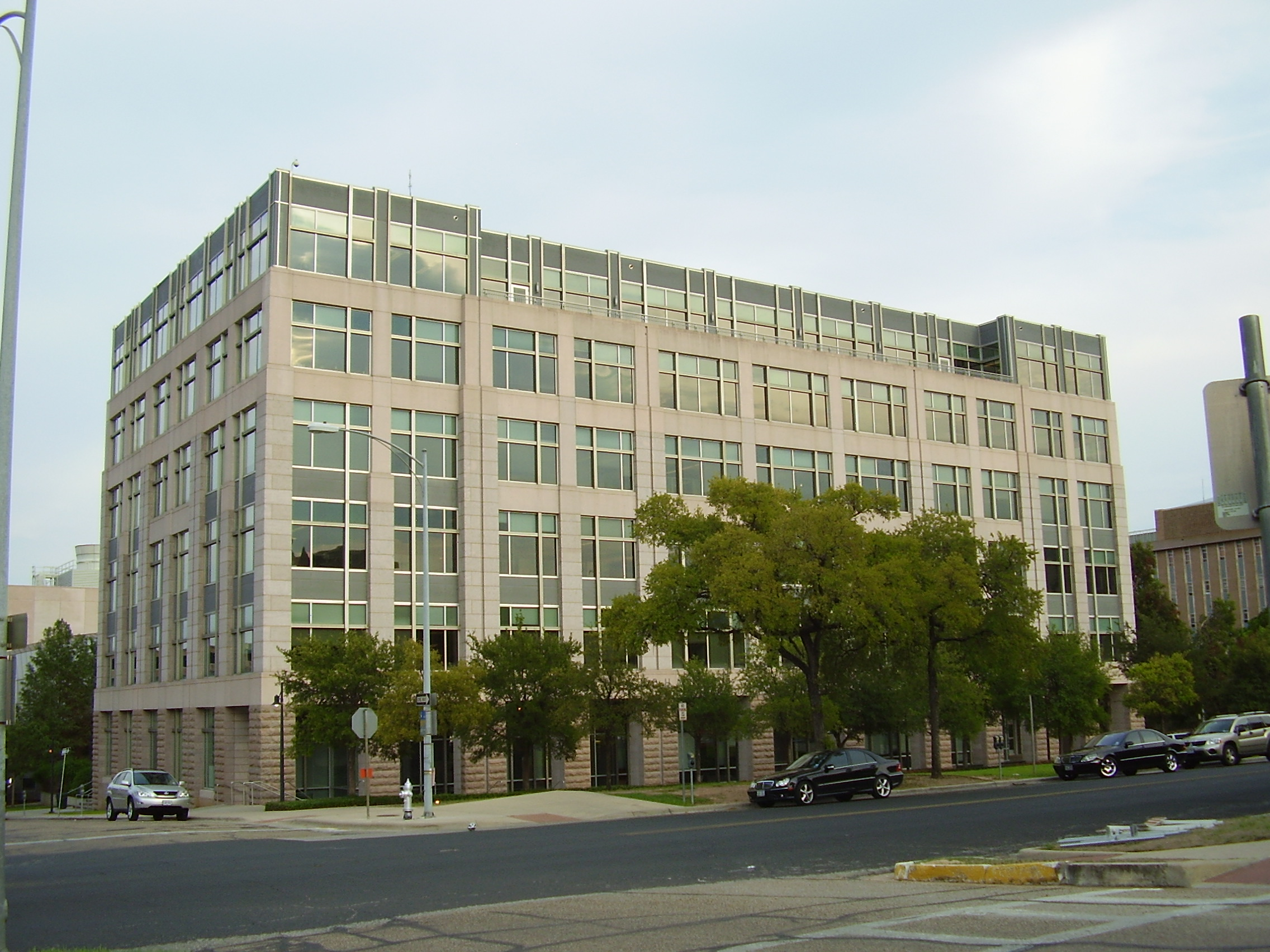
The Robert E. Johnson State Office Building houses the Sunset Advisory Commission

Under the Sunset Act, every state agency (excluding universities, courts, agencies mandated under the Texas Constitution, or those specifically exempted by other legislative action) has a specific date on which it will automatically be abolished unless the legislature passes a bill to continue the agency. Agencies typically are reviewed every 12 years. During the 2009 legislative session, the session adjourned without the legislature continuing several agencies (among them the Texas Department of Transportation, the state's largest), thus requiring the governor to call a special session.

Sunset staff conducts an agency's review in the interim before the session when the agency's enabling act comes under legislative scrutiny. The agency prepares a self-evaluation report for the commission. Sunset staff meets with the agency's leadership and staff as well as interest groups, regulated entities, and members of the public who are affected by the agency. Staff also coordinates with other state oversight agencies, such as the State Auditor's Office and the Legislative Budget Board. After the staff publishes its report with recommendations to the commission, the commission holds a public hearing and takes public comments, then holds a second public meeting to make decisions about which recommendations to adopt, including any new proposals from other sources. The commission can recommend any of the following:

- Continue the agency as is.
- Continue the agency with modifications (including moving functions from the agency to other agencies, moving functions from other agencies into it, and most commonly, making improvements to the effectiveness and efficiency of an agency's functions).
- Merge the agency with another agency.
- Disband the agency and either transfer its functions to other agencies, or abolish them altogether.

If the commission recommends continuing the agency, it must provide draft legislation to extend the agency's Sunset date and to make any other recommendations the commission adopted. The legislature must pass a bill in order to continue an agency's existence and has complete freedom to amend or reject the commission's recommendations. Generally, the bill will continue the agency for 12 years (six biennial sessions), but this may be shortened to equalize the number and size of agencies under review each biennium or to allow the commission and the legislature to review the status of significant actions taken regarding the agency. If an agency is abolished, the Sunset Act provides a one-year wind-down period for the agency to conclude its operations.

The commission also performs limited reviews on agencies not subject to the commission at the discretion of the legislature and can recommend that the agency be abolished. In those cases the legislature must pass a bill to abolish the agency without the incentive of an expiring Sunset date in the agency's enabling act.
