= Texas House Bill 2 =

Texas House Bill 2 (HB2) is a bill within the Eighty-third Texas Legislature, first introduced into the Texas Senate as Texas Senate Bill 5 (SB5) on June 11, 2013, related to abortion rights within the state. Among provisions include banning abortions 20 weeks post-fertilization, and mandating that doctors practicing abortions must have admitting privileges at a nearby hospital.

SB5 was heavily criticized by state Democrats, and passage during a special session in the Texas Senate was blocked by a filibuster by Senator Wendy Davis by the end of the legislative term at the end of June. Governor Rick Perry created a second special session, in which the failed SB5 was reintroduced within the Texas House of Representatives as HB2, and eventually passed both Houses and signed into law by Gov. Perry on July 18, 2013. The law faced immediate legal scrutiny, and in July 2016, the United States Supreme Court held some parts of the law to be unconstitutional in its decision on Whole Woman's Health v. Hellerstedt.

== Bill content ==
Texas Senate Bill 5 is a list of measures that would amend and add to abortion regulations in Texas, drawn from previous bills that had failed earlier in the legislative term. Four key measures introduced by the bill included:

1. A ban on abortion at 20 weeks post-fertilization and recognize that the state has a compelling interest to protect fetuses from pain (aka a "fetal pain" bill).
2. Requiring doctors who perform abortions to have admitting privileges at a nearby hospital within 30 miles (48 km).
3. Requiring abortion clinics to meet the same standards as other surgical health-care facilities in the state.
4. Requiring medical oversight for women taking abortion-inducing drugs such as RU-486.

The bill would not apply to abortions necessary to save the mother's life or to prevent permanent bodily damage from a pregnancy.

== History ==
=== First Special Session ===
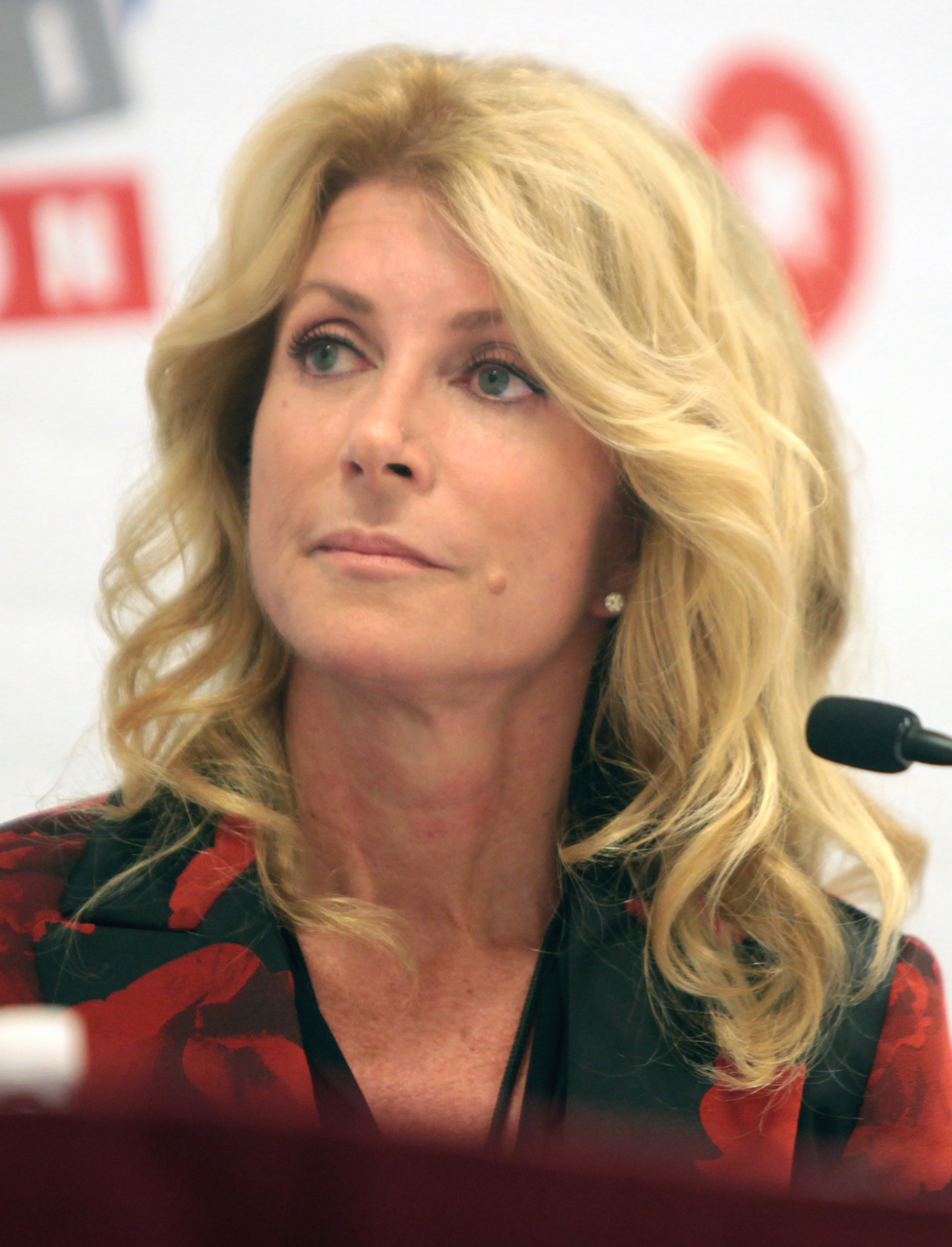
Texas Senator Wendy Davis, who filibustered to prevent passage of SB5 during the first special session

During the 2012–2013 Eighty-third Texas Legislature, several bills were introduced related to abortion restrictions but which failed to pass. With several legislative matters left unresolved as the Texas Legislature ended its normal term in May 2013, including voting in new redistricting maps, Governor Rick Perry issued a 30-day special session started May 27, 2013, which under Texas law allows him to ask the legislature to produce legislation for other matters that he requests.

Among issues that Perry sought was abortion. SB5 was introduced mid-June 2013, which combined elements of several of the failed bills from the term. It passed through the committee stage and proceeded to be passed by the Senate. In the House, an amended version of SB5 was passed on June 23, 2013; because of this amendment, the Senate could not act on the bill for 48 hours, on June 25, 2013, the last day of the special session. If the bill failed before the normal end of the session, the bill would be dead.

Democratic lawmakers in the Senate sought ways to block the passage of the bill. Senator Wendy Davis along with other senators made plans for her to launch into a filibuster on June 25 as to prevent a call for a vote before the end of the session, which would kill the bill. After ten hours, Lieutenant Governor David Dewhurst ruled that Davis had gone off topic after Davis began talking about a sonogram bill, forcing a vote on whether the filibuster could continue. Despite efforts to pass the bill, parliamentary inquiries from Leticia R. Van de Putte and other senators, as well as disruption from the gallery caused the session to go on through midnight, the official closure of the special session. Following the deadline, Republicans indicated that a vote had taken place and passed 19–11, while Democrats declared that the vote had taken place after midnight, making the vote void. Dewhurst later conceded that the bill was passed after the deadline and was considered dead.

=== Timestamp issue ===
After the bill was thought to have been passed, a record was added to the official web page on the history of the bill. According to the page, the timestamp of the bill's passage was listed as the 26th. Later, the page was taken down and altered to say that the bill was passed on the 25th. According to Texas Penal Code, Section 37.10, it is a crime to make an alteration that is false in a government document or record. According to the Legislative Reference Library of Texas the Texas Legislature Online system "... is not the official record of those actions, and [the Legislative Reference Library staff] enters actions on TLO as a public service independently of the officers of the house or senate." The Public Integrity Unit began an investigation into the events after receiving complaints.

=== Second Special Session ===
The day after Davis' filibuster, Governor Perry ordered a second special session to start July 1, 2013, with demands for the legislation to look at three specific topics including abortion. Perry stated that it was due to the "[...] breakdown of decorum and decency to prevent us from doing what the people of this state hired us to do." During the second session, a large number of supporters and opponents of the bill showed up at the Texas Legislative building while wearing blue or orange shirts in support of their respective sides.

SB5 was revived as the new House Bill 2 (HB2), and which passed by July 10, 2013, by a 96–49 margin and sent the measure to the Texas Senate. The Senate passed the bill on July 13, 2013, with a bipartisan vote with a 19–11 margin. The bill was signed into law by Perry on July 18, 2013. One commentator for the National Review stated that "Wendy Davis won the battle, but Rick Perry won the war."

== Public response ==
Organizations and people on both sides used websites like Twitter and the Texas Tribune to share their side and learn more, with several hashtags becoming popular on Twitter. Coverage and a livestream of the Texas Legislature by the Texas Tribune has been said to have been the reason that the bill became national, and later international, news.

Psychedelic rock band The Bright Light Social Hour were in the gallery during Senator Davis's filibuster of the first special session. The following morning the band released the song "Wendy Davis," based on the chants of the protesting crowd. The song was accompanied by a video made with protest footage taken from the band's phones, which was featured in MSNBC's coverage of the event.

Images of the placard carried by pro-choice activists Billy Joe Cain, his daughter Tuesday, with the message "JESUS isn't a DICK; so keep him OUT of MY VAGINA!" went viral, the resultant controversy was reported nationally and internationally.

=== Debate ===
Many people who are against the bill have opposed the requirement that would force clinics to follow the same standards as surgical centers, since it could lead to the closure of the clinics and result in large areas of the state to not have access to a clinic. Many major medical groups such as the American Medical Association, the American Academy of Family Physicians, and the American College of Obstetricians and Gynecologists argue that this bill is damaging to women's health by closing clinics and adding undue obstacles and medical expenses that can push abortions into the second trimester. Supporters of the legislation have stated that the purpose of the new law is to protect women's health and unborn children, citing precedents like the recent Kermit Gosnell case.

Abortion access in the state of Texas has seen a serious decline since the passage of Senate Bill 5. There were 44 facilities that performed abortions in Texas in 2011, When the law is fully implemented in September, that number is expected to drop to six. Amy Hagstrom Miller, the chief executive of Whole Woman's Health, which has challenged provisions of the law in court. "I tried everything I can. I just can't keep the doors open."

== Impact ==
During the period where no injunction had been placed on enforcement of the law, the number of operating abortion clinics dropped in the state from 42 to 19.

A 2017 National Bureau of Economic Research paper used the legislation to identify the effects of abortion access. The study found that "as the distance to the nearest abortion provider increases from less than 25 miles to 25-50 miles, there is little change in rates of legally induced abortions. But an increase to 50-100 miles reduces legal abortion rates by 16 percent, an increase to 100-200 miles reduces abortion rates by 32 percent, and an increase to 200 or more miles reduces abortion rates by 47 percent. We also introduce a proxy for congestion that predicts additional reductions in abortion rates as fewer clinics serve more women."

Another 2017 National Bureau of Economic Research paper found that "In-state abortions fell 20% and births rose 3% in counties that no longer had an abortion provider within 50 miles. Births increased 1% and contraceptive purchases rose 8% in counties without a publicly-funded family planning clinic within 25 miles."

A 2016 study interviewed 23 women in Texas who had sought abortions at clinics that were no longer providing such services. It found that because of the clinic closures caused by the law, women became confused about where to obtain abortion services. The same study found that most of the women interviewed had to spend more money and time to obtain abortion services, and that their privacy was compromised by having to travel further than they previously had to. Another 2016 study by the same research team found that Texas women whose nearest clinic closed had to travel on average 85 miles to have abortions, while women whose nearest clinic did not close had to travel an average of 22 miles.

== Court challenge ==
HB2 faced two legal challenges after its passage. The first, Planned Parenthood v. Abbott, started in 2013, challenging the admitting privileges and medical oversight of abortion-inducing drugs provisions of HB2. While the District Court had granted an injunction on enforcement of HB2, based on the "undue burden" standard established in Planned Parenthood v. Casey (1992), the Fifth Circuit Appeals Court stayed the injunction, and the United States Supreme Court upheld it by November 2013, allowing the law to be enforced.

A second set of abortion providers filed suit in the United States District Court for the Western District of Texas seeking an injunction preventing enforcement of the admitting-privileges provision as applied to physicians at two abortion facilities, one operated by Whole Woman's Health in McAllen and the other operated by Nova Health Systems in El Paso. They also sought an injunction prohibiting enforcement of both the admitting privilege and surgical-center requirements. In August 2014, the District Court ruled in favor of the plaintiffs and issued the sought injunction. In October, the Fifth Circuit stayed the injunction. Two weeks later, the Supreme Court vacated the stay, allowing the injunction to take effect during Texas's appeal of the district court's ruling. On June 9, 2015, the Court of Appeals unanimously overturned the lower court's ruling, finding that neither abortion restriction placed an undue burden on women as mandated in Planned Parenthood v. Casey. Later that month, the Supreme Court stayed the Fifth Circuit's ruling by a 5–4 vote, preventing the restrictions from being enforced once again. On June 27, 2016, the Supreme Court ruled 5–3 that the Texas abortion restrictions are unconstitutional, striking down the two provisions of the law.
