= 2004 Texas Senate election =

- November 2, 2004

15 of the 31 seats in the Texas Senate 16 seats needed for a majority
| | Majority party | Minority party |
|---|---|---|
| Party | Republican | Democratic |
| Seats before | 19 | 12 |
| Seats won | 19 | 12 |
| Seat change | Steady | Steady |
| Popular vote | 1,589,684 | 901,490 |
| Percentage | 63.50% | 36.01% |
| Swing | ▲5.73% | ▼2.36% |
- Senate results by district Republican hold Democratic hold No election
President Pro Tempore before election
Republican
Elected President Pro Tempore
Republican

The 2004 Texas Senate elections took place as part of the biennial United States elections. Texas voters elected state senators in 15 State Senate districts. All of the seats up for this election were for two-year terms, with senators up for re-election in the 2008 elections. The winners of this election served in the 79th Texas Legislature.

Following the 2002 elections, the Republicans maintained effective control of the Senate, with nineteen members to the Democrats' twelve.

To claim control of the chamber from Republicans, the Democrats needed to gain four seats. In the end, no seats changed hands.

== Background ==
The Republican Party had held the state senate since the 1996 elections. In 2002, Republicans gained control of the Texas House of Representatives, giving them unified control of the state's government. This led to the 2003 Texas redistricting, where Republicans redrew the state's congressional districts which had been implemented by federal courts for the 2002 elections. During that session, eleven members of the Texas Senate left the state to break quorum in an attempt to prevent the plan from passing. This strategy eventually failed due to the defection of Senator John Whitmire of Houston.

== Predictions ==
| Source | Ranking | As of |
|---|---|---|
| Rothenberg | Safe R | October 1, 2004 |

== Overview ==
Summary of the November 2, 2004 Texas Senate election results
| Party | Candidates | Votes | | Seats | | | | |
| Party | Candidates | No. | % | Before | Up | Won | After | +/– |
|---|---|---|---|---|---|---|---|---|
| Republican | 10 | 1,589,684 | 63.50 | 19 | 9 | 9 | 19 | Steady |
| Democratic | 9 | 901,490 | 36.01 | 12 | 6 | 6 | 12 | Steady |
| Libertarian | 2 | 11,903 | 0.48 | 0 | 0 | 0 | 0 | Steady |
| Write-in | 1 | 160 | 0.01 | 0 | 0 | 0 | 0 | Steady |
| Total | | 2,503,243 | 100.00 | 31 | 15 | 15 | 31 | Steady |

Popular vote
| Republican | 63.50% |
| Democratic | 36.01% |
| Libertarian | 0.48% |
| Write-in | 0.01% |

Senate seats won
| Republican | 60.00% |
| Democratic | 40.00% |

== Summary of results by state senate district ==
| District | Democratic | | Republican | | Others | | Total | | Result |
| District | Votes | % | Votes | % | Votes | % | Votes | % | Result |
|---|---|---|---|---|---|---|---|---|---|
| District 4 | - | - | 176,464 | 100.00% | - | - | 176,464 | 100.00% | Republican hold |
| District 6 | 75,318 | 91.75% | - | - | 6,774 | 8.25% | 82,092 | 100.00% | Democratic hold |
| District 9 | - | - | 143,501 | 100.00% | - | - | 143,501 | 100.00% | Republican hold |
| District 10 | 107,853 | 40.75% | 156,831 | 59.25% | - | - | 264,684 | 100.00% | Republican hold |
| District 11 | - | - | 177,554 | 100.00% | - | - | 177,554 | 100.00% | Republican hold |
| District 16 | - | - | 142,542 | 100.00% | - | - | 142,542 | 100.00% | Republican hold |
| District 20 | 116,723 | 100.00% | - | - | - | - | 116,723 | 100.00% | Democratic hold |
| District 21 | 127,573 | 100.00% | - | - | - | - | 127,573 | 100.00% | Democratic hold |
| District 23 | 150,244 | 100.00% | - | - | - | - | 150,244 | 100.00% | Democratic hold |
| District 24 | - | - | 189,778 | 100.00% | - | - | 189,778 | 100.00% | Republican hold |
| District 26 | 105,625 | 57.10% | 74,070 | 40.04% | 5,295 | 2.86% | 184,990 | 100.00% | Democratic hold |
| District 27 | 89,984 | 100.00% | - | - | - | - | 89,984 | 100.00% | Democratic hold |
| District 28 | 176,588 | 100.00% | - | - | - | - | 176,588 | 100.00% | Republican hold |
| District 30 | 81,614 | 30.95% | 182,057 | 69.05% | - | - | 263,671 | 100.00% | Republican hold |
| District 31 | 46,556 | 21.47% | 170,299 | 78.53% | - | - | 216,855 | 100.00% | Republican hold |
| Total | 901,490 | 36.01% | 1,589,684 | 63.50% | 12,069 | 0.48% | 2,503,243 | 100.00% | Source: |
