= Bill Zedler =

Texas state legislator

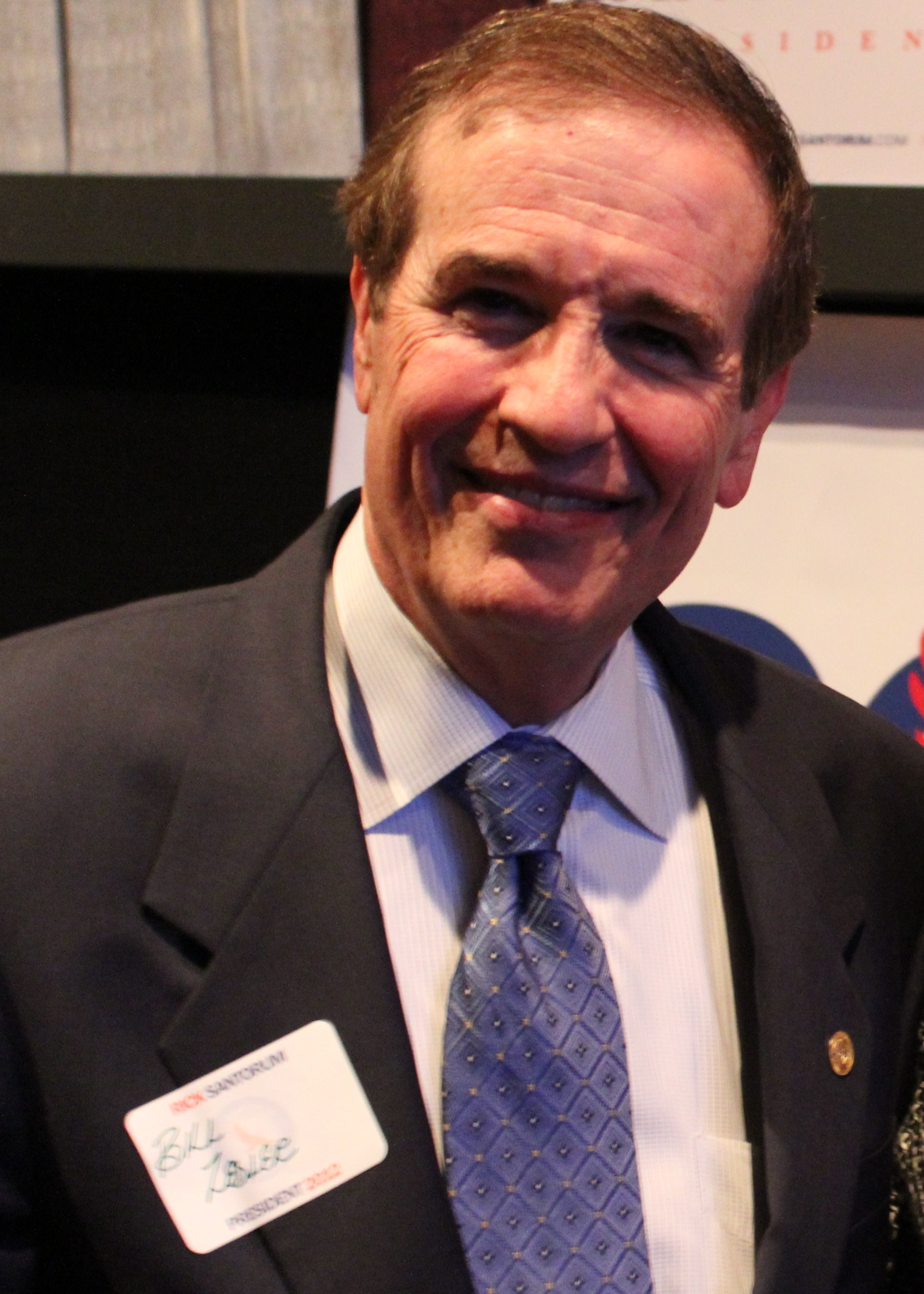
- Zedler in 2012

Member of the Texas House of Representatives from the 96th district
- In office January 11, 2011 – 2021
- Preceded by: Chris Turner (now in District 101)
- Succeeded by: David Cook
- In office January 14, 2003 – January 13, 2009
- Preceded by: Kim Brimer
- Succeeded by: Chris Turner

Personal details
- Born: August 19, 1943 (age 83)
- Party: Republican
- Spouse: Ellen Tuffly Zedler
- Children: 3
- Education: Sam Houston State University
- Occupation: Retired medical consultant

William Wade Zedler, known as Bill Zedler (born August 19, 1943), is a retired medical consultant from Arlington, Texas and a former a Republican member of the Texas House of Representatives for District 96. He served continuously from 2003 to 2021 except for the term from 2009 to 2011, when he was temporarily unseated by Democrat Chris Turner.

A board member of the bipartisan Texas Conservative Coalition, Zedler was considered one of the most conservative of contemporary Texas legislators.

Zedler won his seventh nonconsecutive term in the state House in the general election held on November 6, 2018. With 32,656 votes (50.9 percent), he defeated Democrat Ryan E. Ray, who polled 30,295 (47.2 percent). The Libertarian Stephen Parmer held another 746 votes (1.9 percent).

In February 2019, Zedler, whom The Texas Observer labeled an "outspoken anti-vaxxer", drew national attention when he introduced a Texas bill that would allow parents to opt-out of school vaccination requirements. The move was criticized as support for the anti-vax movement, so he later tried to set the record straight by explaining he wasn't "completely against vaccines". He was also criticized for his false claim that measles, which is caused by a virus, could be treated with antibiotics. He was quoted as saying "They want to say people are dying of measles. Yeah, in third-world countries they're dying of measles. Today, with antibiotics and that kind of stuff, they’re not dying in America." In the U.S. 1-2 people die for every 1000 people infected with measles.

Texas House of Representatives
Preceded by Kim Brimer	Texas State Representative for District 96 (part of Tarrant County); 2003–2009	Succeeded by Chris Turner
Preceded by Chris Turner (now in District 101)	Texas State Representative for District 96 (part of Tarrant County); 2011–2021	Succeeded by David Cook
