= Texas's 10th Senate district =

American legislative district

Texas's 10th State Senate district
Senator
Phil King; R–Weatherford
- Demographics: 43.9% White; 20.5% Black; 30.7% Hispanic; 4.8% Asian
- Population: 912,860

District 10 of the Texas Senate is a senatorial district that currently serves all of Brown, Callahan, Johnson, Palo Pinto, Shackelford, and Stephens counties, and portions of Parker and Tarrant counties. The current senator from District 10 is Republican Phil King.

== Election history ==
Election history of District 10 from 1992.

=== 2024 ===
Texas general election, 2024: Senate District 10
Party	Candidate	Votes	%
Republican	Phil King	227,475	61.71
Democratic	Andy Morris	141,163	38.29
Majority		86,312	23.42
Turnout		368,638	
Republican hold			

=== 2022 ===
Phil King (Republican) was unopposed; as such, the election was cancelled and King was declared elected without a vote, with the Republican Party gaining the seat from the Democratic Party.

=== 2018 ===
Texas general election, 2018: Senate District 10
Party	Candidate	Votes	%	±%
Democratic	Beverly Powell	148,959	51.73	+7.01
Republican	Konni Burton	138,968	48.27	−4.56
Majority		9,991	3.47	−4.64
Turnout		287,927		
Democratic gain from Republican				

=== 2014 ===
Texas general election, 2014: Senate District 10
Party	Candidate	Votes	%	±%
Republican	Konni Burton	95,532	52.83	+3.95
Democratic	Libby Willis	80,872	44.72	−6.39
Libertarian	Gene Lord	3,340	1.85	1.85
Green	John Tunmire	1,094	0.60	+0.60
Majority		14,660	8.11	+5.88
Turnout		180,838		
Republican gain from Democratic				

=== 2012 ===
Texas general election, 2012: Senate District 10
Party	Candidate	Votes	%	±%
Democratic	Wendy Davis (Incumbent)	147,005	51.11	+1.20
Republican	Mark Shelton	140,603	48.88	+1.36
Majority		6,402	2.23	−0.16
Turnout		287,759		
Democratic hold				

=== 2008 ===
Texas general election, 2008: Senate District 10
Party	Candidate	Votes	%	±%
Democratic	Wendy Davis	147,832	49.91	+9.16
Republican	Kim Brimer (Incumbent)	140,737	47.52	−11.73
Libertarian	Richard A. Cross	7,591	2.56	+2.56
Majority		7,095	2.39	−16.11
Turnout		296,160	30.68	+1.87
Democratic gain from Republican				

=== 2004 ===
Texas general election, 2004: Senate District 10
Party	Candidate	Votes	%	±%
Republican	Kim Brimer (Incumbent)	156,831	59.25	+0.55
Democratic	Andrew B. Hill	107,853	40.75	+0.82
Majority		48,978	18.50	−0.28
Turnout				
Republican hold				

=== 2002 ===
Texas general election, 2002: Senate District 10
Party	Candidate	Votes	%	±%
Republican	Kim Brimer	101,511	58.71	−41.29
Democratic	Hal Ray	69,038	39.93	+39.93
Libertarian	John Paul Robinson	2,367	1.37	+1.37
Majority		32,473	18.78	−81.22
Turnout		172,916		−7.68
Republican hold				

Republican primary, 2002: Senate District 10
Candidate		Votes	%	±
✓	Kim Brimer	11,823	62.88	
	Karen "Kerry" Lundelius	6,979	37.12	
Majority		4,844	25.76	
Turnout		18,802		

=== 2000 ===
Texas general election, 2000: Senate District 10
Party	Candidate	Votes	%	±%
Republican	Chris Harris (Incumbent)	187,302	100.00	0.00
Majority	187,302	100.00	0.00	
Turnout	187,302		+25.85	
Republican hold				

=== 1996 ===
Texas general election, 1996: Senate District 10
Party	Candidate	Votes	%	±%
Republican	Chris Harris (Incumbent)	154,989	100.00	0.00
Majority		154,989	100.00	0.00
Turnout		154,989		+19.83
Republican hold				

Republican primary, 1996: Senate District 10
Candidate		Votes	%	±
✓	Chris Harris (Incumbent)	30,330	77.80	
	Jim Lollar	8,656	22.20	
Majority		21,674	55.59	
Turnout		38,986		

=== 1994 ===
Texas general election, 1994: Senate District 10
Party	Candidate	Votes	%	±%
Republican	Chris Harris (Incumbent)	129,343	100.00	+38.64
Majority		129,343	100.00	+77.27
Turnout		129,343		−40.30
Republican hold				

=== 1992 ===
Texas general election, 1992: Senate District 10
Party	Candidate	Votes	%	±%
Democratic	Bob Bass	83,711	38.64	
Republican	Chris Harris (Incumbent)	132,947	61.36	
Majority		49,236	22.73	
Turnout		216,658		
Republican hold				

== District officeholders ==
Legislature	Senator, District 10	Counties in District
1	Isaac W. Brashear	Harris.
2	Isaac W. Brashear	Harris.
3	Isaac Parker	Anderson, Cherokee, Houston.
4	Z. Williams Eddy	Jasper, Newton, Sabine, San Augustine.
5	Elisha Everett Lott	Smith, Van Zandt.
6	Elisha Everett Lott	Smith, Van Zandt.
7	Elisha Everett Lott	Smith, Van Zandt.
8	Elisha Everett Lott	Smith, Van Zandt.
9	Robert Henry Guinn	Cherokee.
10	Robert Henry Guinn	Cherokee.
11	Robert Henry Guinn	Cherokee.
12	David W. Cole	Hopkins, Hunt, Wood.
13	David W. Cole	Hopkins, Hunt, Wood.
14	Joseph Morris	Delta, Hopkins, Hunt, Rains, Wood.
15	B. D. Martin	Hunt, Kaufman, Rains, Rockwall, Van Zandt, Wood.
16	John C. Buchanan	Hunt, Kaufman, Rains, Rockwall, Van Zandt, Wood.
17	John C. Buchanan	Hunt, Kaufman, Rains, Rockwall, Van Zandt, Wood.
18	Asa E. Stratton, Jr.	Brazoria, Galveston, Matagorda.
19	W. M. Jerdone	Brazoria, Galveston, Matagorda.
20	John M. Claiborne	Brazoria, Galveston, Matagorda.
21	John M. Claiborne	Brazoria, Galveston, Matagorda.
22	Marcus M. Mott	Brazoria, Galveston, Matagorda.
23	Astyanax M. Douglass	Ellis, Hill, Johnson.
24	James Andrew Beall	Ellis, Hill, Johnson.
25	James Andrew Beall	Ellis, Hill, Johnson.
26	Daniel W. Odell	Ellis, Hill, Johnson.
27	Daniel W. Odell	Ellis, Hill, Johnson.
28	Astyanax M. Douglass	Ellis, Hill, Johnson.
29	Sidney P. Skinner	Ellis, Hill, Johnson.
30	Sidney P. Skinner	Ellis, Hill, Johnson.
31	Pierce B. Ward	Ellis, Hill, Johnson.
32	Pierce B. Ward	Ellis, Hill, Johnson.
33	Wright C. Morrow	Ellis, Hill, Johnson.
34	Wright C. Morrow	Ellis, Hill, Johnson.
35	James M. Alderdice	Ellis, Hill, Johnson.
36	James M. Alderdice	Ellis, Hill, Johnson.
37	William E. Watts	Ellis, Hill, Johnson.
38	William E. Watts	Ellis, Hill, Johnson.
39	Joseph M. Moore	Collin, Hunt, Rains, Rockwall.
40	Joseph M. Moore	Collin, Hunt, Rains, Rockwall.
41	Joseph M. Moore	Collin, Hunt, Rains, Rockwall.
42	Joseph M. Moore	Collin, Hunt, Rains, Rockwall.
43	Joseph M. Moore	Collin, Hunt, Rains, Rockwall.
44	Wallace Hughston; Claude Isbell	Collin, Hunt, Rains, Rockwall.
45	Claude Isbell	Collin, Hunt, Rains, Rockwall.
46	Claude Isbell	Collin, Hunt, Rains, Rockwall.
47	Claude Isbell; George C. Morris	Collin, Hunt, Rains, Rockwall.
48	George C. Morris	Collin, Hunt, Rains, Rockwall.
49	George C. Morris	Collin, Hunt, Rains, Rockwall.
50	George C. Morris	Collin, Hunt, Rains, Rockwall.
51	George C. Morris	Collin, Hunt, Rains, Rockwall.
52	Joe Russell	Collin, Hunt, Rains, Rockwall.
53	Doyle Willis	Tarrant.
54	Doyle Willis	Tarrant.
55	Doyle Willis	Tarrant.
56	Doyle Willis	Tarrant.
57	Doyle Willis	Tarrant.
58	Don Kennard	Tarrant.
59	Don Kennard	Tarrant.
60	Don Kennard	Portion of Tarrant.
61	Don Kennard	Portion of Tarrant.
62	Don Kennard	Portion of Tarrant.
63	Bill Meier	Portion of Tarrant.
64	Bill Meier	Portion of Tarrant.
65	Bill Meier	Portion of Tarrant.
66	Bill Meier	Portion of Tarrant.
67	Bill Meier	Portion of Tarrant.
68	Bob McFarland	Portions of Dallas, Denton, Tarrant.
69	Bob McFarland	Portions of Dallas, Denton, Tarrant.
70	Bob McFarland	Portions of Dallas, Denton, Tarrant.
71	Bob McFarland	Portions of Dallas, Denton, Tarrant.
72	Chris Harris	Portions of Dallas, Denton, Tarrant.
73	Chris Harris	Portions of Johnson, Parker, Tarrant.
74	Chris Harris	Portions of Johnson, Parker, Tarrant.
75	Chris Harris	Portions of Johnson, Parker, Tarrant.
76	Chris Harris	Portions of Johnson, Parker, Tarrant.
77	Chris Harris	Portions of Johnson, Parker, Tarrant.
78	Kim Brimer	Portion of Tarrant.
79	Kim Brimer	Portion of Tarrant.
80	Kim Brimer	Portion of Tarrant.
81	Wendy Davis	Portion of Tarrant.
82	Wendy Davis	Portion of Tarrant.
83	Wendy Davis	Portion of Tarrant.
84	Konni Burton	Portion of Tarrant.
85	Konni Burton	Portion of Tarrant.
86	Beverly Powell	Portion of Tarrant.
87	Beverly Powell	Portion of Tarrant.
88	Phil King	All of Brown, Callahan, Johnson, Palo Pinto, Shackelford, Stephens. Portions of Parker, Tarrant.
89	Phil King	All of Brown, Callahan, Johnson, Palo Pinto, Shackelford, Stephens. Portions of Parker, Tarrant.
