= Texas's 61st House of Representatives district =

American legislative district

Texas's 61st State House of Representatives district
Representative
| Keresa Richardson; R–McKinney |
- Demographics: 51.4% White; 12.3% Black; 12.0% Hispanic; 22.5% Asian
- Population (2020) • Voting age: 202,295; 139,746

The 61st district of the Texas House of Representatives contains a portion of Collin County, Texas. The current representative is Keresa Richardson, who was elected in 2024.

== List of representatives ==
- Phil King from 1998 to 2022
- Frederick Frazier (2023-2024)
- Keresa Richardson (since 2024)
