= Texas's 101st House of Representatives district =

American legislative district

Texas's 101st State House of Representatives district
Representative
Chris Turner; D–Arlington
- Demographics: 22.7% White; 34.2% Black; 29.9% Hispanic; 13.2% Asian
- Population (2020) • Voting age: 189,881; 136,571

The 101st district of the Texas House of Representatives consists of southern Arlington, a portion of southern Grand Prairie, and a very small part of eastern Mansfield. The current representative is Chris Turner, who has represented the district since 2013.

Part of Joe Pool Lake is within the district.
