= Kim Brimer =

American politician

Member of the Texas Senate from the 10th district
- In office 2003–2009
- Preceded by: Chris Harris
- Succeeded by: Wendy Davis

Member of the Texas House of Representatives from the 96th district
- In office 1989–2003
- Preceded by: Michael D. Millsap
- Succeeded by: Bill Zedler

Personal details
- Born: March 5, 1945 (age 81) Houston, Texas, U.S.
- Party: Republican
- Education: B.S., Stephen F. Austin State University

Kenneth Kimberlin Brimer Jr., known as Kim Brimer (born 5 March 1945), is a Republican former member of the Texas State Senate from Fort Worth, Texas. He represented District 10. He was the only GOP member of the 31-member chamber to have been defeated in the general election held on November 4, 2008, when he lost to Democrat Wendy R. Davis of Fort Worth, her party's 2014 nominee for governor against Republican Greg Abbott.

Brimer also served for seven terms in the Texas House of Representatives from 1989 to 2003. In the 2000 primary, he defeated a challenge from Bill Zedler, a medical consultant from Fort Worth. Brimer polled 5,472 votes (55 percent) to Bill Zedler's 4,461 (45 percent). In 2002, Zedler won the House seat that Brimer vacated to move on to the state Senate.

Brimer was born in Houston to Kenneth Brimer Sr., and the former Louie Francis Hughes and earned a B.S. degree in Business Administration from Stephen F. Austin State University in Nacogdoches, Texas.

In July 2005, Texas Monthly magazine, in its article "The Best and Worst Legislators of 2005," awarded Brimer an "Honorable Mention" for his resolution of the Senate deadlock over taxes.

Brimer is a cousin of actor Trey Wilson.

== Most recent election ==
=== 2008 ===
Texas general election, 2008: Senate District 10
Party	Candidate	Votes	%	±%
Republican	Kim Brimer (Incumbent)	140,737	47.52	−11.73
Democratic	Wendy Davis	147,832	49.94	+9.17
Libertarian	Richard A. Cross	7,591	2.56	+2.56
Majority		7,095	2.42	
Turnout		296,160		+11.89
Democratic gain from Republican		Swing	+9.19	

== Previous elections ==
=== 2004 ===
Texas general election, 2004: Senate District 10
Party	Candidate	Votes	%	±%
Republican	Kim Brimer (Incumbent)	156,831	59.25	+0.55
Democratic	Andrew B. Hill	107,853	40.75	+0.82
Majority		48,978	18.50	−0.28
Turnout				
Republican hold				

=== 2002 ===
Republican primary, 2002: Senate District 10
Party	Candidate	Votes	%
Republican	Kim Brimer	11,823	62.88
Republican	Karen "Kerry" Lundelius	6,979	37.12

Texas general election, 2002: Senate District 10
Party	Candidate	Votes	%	±%
Republican	Kim Brimer	101,511	58.71	−41.29
Democratic	Hal Ray	69,038	39.93	+39.93
Libertarian	John Paul Robinson	2,367	1.37	+1.37
Majority		32,473	18.78	−81.22
Turnout		172,916		−7.68
Republican hold				

Texas House of Representatives
Preceded by Michael D. Millsap	Member of the Texas House of Representatives from District 96 (Fort Worth)^{(1)} 1989–2003	Succeeded by Bill Zedler
Texas Senate
Preceded by Chris Harris	Texas State Senator from District 10 (Fort Worth); 2003-2009	Succeeded by Wendy Davis
Notes and references
1. In the 72nd through 76th Legislatures (1991–2001), Brimer’s home was in Arlington
