= John E. Davis (Texas politician) =

American politician

John Edward Davis

Member of the Texas House of Representatives from the 129th district
- In office January 12, 1999 – January 13, 2015
- Preceded by: Mike Jackson
- Succeeded by: Dennis Paul

Personal details
- Born: July 7, 1960 (age 66)
- Party: Republican

John Edward Davis (born July 7, 1960) was a Republican member of the Texas House of Representatives from 1999 to 2015, representing House District 129 in Harris County.

Political offices
Texas House of Representatives
Preceded by Mike Jackson (elected to Texas Senate, District 11)	Texas State Representative for District 129 (Houston); 1999–2015	Succeeded by Dennis Paul
