= Texas's 129th House of Representatives district =

American legislative district

Texas's 129th State House of Representatives district
Representative
Dennis Paul; R–Houston
- Demographics: 48.6% White; 9.7% Black; 29.1% Hispanic; 11.3% Asian
- Population (2020) • Voting age: 203,209; 155,904

The 129th district of the Texas House of Representatives contains parts of Harris County. The current representative is Dennis Paul, who was first elected in 2014.

== Members ==
- Ed R. Watson (until 1989)
- Mike Jackson (1989–1999)
- John E. Davis (1999–2015)
- Dennis Paul (2015–2027)
- Scott Bowen (2027–)
