= Charles Cunningham (politician) =

American politician

Member of the Texas House of Representatives
- Incumbent
- Assumed office January 2023
- Preceded by: Dan Huberty
- Constituency: 127th district (2023–present)

Charles Cunningham is an American politician who serves in the Texas House of Representatives where he represents Texas's 127th House of Representatives district, which contains parts of Harris County. He is a member of the Republican party.

Cunningham, who is African American, served in the United States Army and graduated from Our Lady of the Lake University. Prior to his 2022 election to the Texas legislature, Cunningham was a member of the Humble Independent School District board for twelve years, was a member of the Humble, Texas city council for four years, and worked for CenterPoint Energy.

Cunningham supported Texas Senate Bill 8, the state's anti-abortion legislation. In the acrimonious Republican caucus internal election in December 2024, Cunningham supported Representative David Cook for speaker of the House; Cook ultimately lost to Dustin Burrows.
