= Phil King (Texas politician) =

American politician (born 1956)

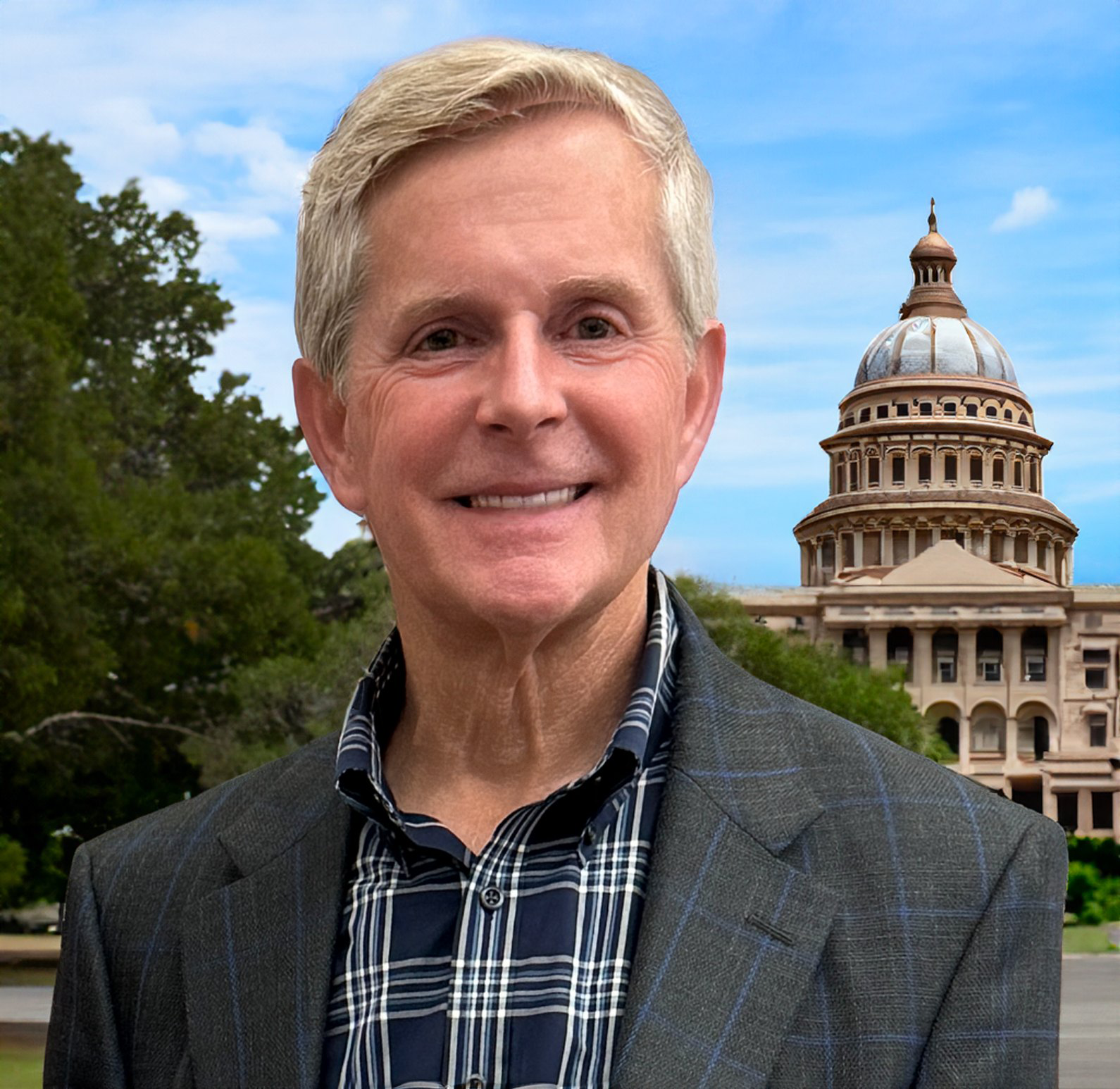
- King in 2024

Member of the Texas Senate from the 10th district
- Incumbent
- Assumed office January 10, 2023
- Preceded by: Beverly Powell

Member of the Texas House of Representatives from the 61st district
- In office January 12, 1999 – January 10, 2023
- Preceded by: Ric Williamson
- Succeeded by: Frederick Frazier

Personal details
- Born: Phillip Stephen King; February 29, 1956 (age 70)
- Party: Republican
- Spouse: Terry King
- Children: 6
- Education: Dallas Baptist University (BA, MBA); Texas Wesleyan University (JD)
- Occupation: Attorney
- Website: Office website Campaign website

Phillip Stephen King (born February 29, 1956) is an American attorney from Weatherford, Texas serving as a member of the Texas Senate since 2023. A member of the Republican Party, he served in the Texas House of Representatives from 1999 to 2023.

== Election history ==
King was nominated without opposition in the 1998 Republican primary when the incumbent, Ric Williamson, did not seek re-election. In the general election, King defeated the Democratic candidate, Brenda Brown Rotramble, 21,200 (65%) to 11,626 (35%). (At the time, the district included a portion of neighboring Cooke County.)

- 2000 - King ran unopposed.
- 2002 - King defeated the Democratic candidate Mack Dobbs, 25,525 (69%) to 11,475 (31%).
- 2004 - King ran unopposed.
- 2006 - King defeated the Libertarian candidate Richard Forsythe Jr., 27,470 (80% to 6,696 (20%), in the general election the Democratic Party did not field a candidate.
- 2008 - King faced two opponents in the general election, Democratic candidate Charles William Randolph and (once again facing) Libertarian candidate Forsythe, defeating them 48,879 (73%) to Randolph's 16,308 (24%) and Forsythe's 2,205 (4%).
- 2010 - King defeated the Libertarian candidate, Richard Forysthe Jr. 34,513 (86%) to 5,508 (14%), in the general election.
- 2012 - King defeated Green Party candidate Matthew Britt, 55,737 (89%) to 6,954 (11%).
- 2014 - King again defeated candidate Matthew Britt (who ran under the Democratic banner), 36,466 (83%) to 7,451 (17%).
- 2016 - King was unopposed.
- 2018 - He again ran unopposed.
- 2022 - King won the Republican nomination for the District 10 state Senate seat with 75.5 percent of the Republican primary vote.

== Legislative history ==
King has supported legislation that would institute parental notification and parental consent.

In the regular and then the three special legislative sessions of 2003, King authored the congressional redistricting legislation favored by the Republican Party, which won more than 55 percent of the total votes cast in thirty-two separate congressional races in the 2002 midterm elections even though the Republican Party obtained just fifteen of the U.S. House seats. The result gave the Texas delegation to the U.S. House a temporary 21–11 Republican majority. After the 2006 elections, that margin was reduced to 19–13 Republican and after 2008, 20-12 Republican.

In 2005, King was the House sponsor of Senate Bill 5, which deregulated Texas telecommunications laws and banned Texas cities from participating in projects that offer free wi-fi in airports and public spaces.

King was involved in other legislative matters, including the testing of high school athletes for steroid use, and methods for preventing the circumvention of the parental notification law by abortion clinics. In 2011, he sponsored Senate Bill 14 which required proof of U.S. citizenship by voters at the time of registration.

King authored a bill in the Texas House, HB 347 of the 86th Session, to ban the process of forced annexation by cities over suburban and rural areas. The bill will require a Texas city to get the approval of the people and businesses that are affected by the annexation. It passed both chambers of the Texas legislature and was signed by Governor Greg Abbott on May 24, 2019.

In 2023, King introduced SB 1515 of the 88th Session of the Texas Senate, which would require that the Ten Commandments be displayed in every classroom of every public school in Texas. The bill failed to pass.

It was later passed in 2025 as Texas Senate Bill 10.

== Personal life ==
Prior to his legislative service, King was a captain in the Fort Worth Police Department. He was also an instructor at Dallas Baptist University which is his alma mater, and he served as a justice of the peace in Parker County, Texas. He currently serves as an officer in the Texas State Guard, but never served in the U.S. Armed Forces.

King obtained his Bachelor of Arts and M.B.A. degrees (1980 and 1986) from Dallas Baptist University in Dallas. He also attended Texas Wesleyan University where he obtained his Juris Doctor degree. King and his wife, Terry, are active members of Trinity Bible Church in Weatherford. The couple have six children and sixteen grandchildren.

Texas House of Representatives
Preceded by Ric Williamson	Member of the Texas House of Representatives from the 61st district 1999–2023	Succeeded by Frederick Frazier
Texas Senate
Preceded by Beverly Powell	Member of the Texas Senate from the 10th district 2023–present	Incumbent
