= Claude M. Isbell =

Member of the Texas Legislature (d. 1962)

Claude M. Isbell (1884–1962) was a member of the Texas Legislature.

Isbell, a Democrat, was first elected to the Texas Senate in a special election in 1935. He served in the Texas Senate until 1942. He later also served as Secretary of State of Texas.
