= Chris Harris (Texas politician) =

American politician and attorney

Member of the Texas Senate from the 9th district
- In office 2003–2013
- Preceded by: Jane Nelson
- Succeeded by: Kelly Hancock

Member of the Texas Senate from the 10th district
- In office 1991–2003
- Preceded by: Bob McFarland
- Succeeded by: Kim Brimer

Member of the Texas House of Representatives from the 93rd district
- In office 1985–1991
- Preceded by: Roy E. English
- Succeeded by: Toby R. Goodman

Personal details
- Born: February 19, 1948 Pasadena, California, U.S.
- Died: December 19, 2015 (aged 67) Fort Worth, Texas, U.S.
- Party: Republican
- Occupation: Attorney

Chris Harris (February 19, 1948 – December 19, 2015) was an American politician and attorney who served in the Texas Senate and Texas House of Representatives.

== Biography ==
Chris Harris was born on February 22, 1948, in Pasadena, California. He graduated from Arlington High School, in Arlington, Texas. Harris attended Texas Christian University, and received his Doctor of Jurisprudence from Baylor Law School. Harris practiced family and business law. He and his wife, Tammy, lived in Arlington, Texas. He died at a hospital in Fort Worth on December 19, 2015, at the age of 67.

== Political career ==
Harris served in the Texas House of Representatives from 1985 to 1991 and then served in the Texas State Senate from 1991 to 2013. Harris was a Republican.

== Election history ==
Election history of Harris from 1992.

=== Most recent election ===
==== 2004 ====
Texas general election, 2004: Senate District 9
Party	Candidate	Votes	%	±%
Republican	Chris Harris (Incumbent)	143,501	100.00	+13.44
Majority		143,501	100.00	+26.87
Turnout		143,501		+51.50
Republican hold				

=== Previous elections ===
==== 2002 ====
Texas general election, 2002: Senate District 9
Party	Candidate	Votes	%	±%
Republican	Chris Harris (Incumbent)	81,994	86.56	−13.44
Libertarian	David C. Pepperdine	12,727	13.44	+13.44
Majority		69,267	73.13	−26.87
Turnout		94,721		−54.26
Republican hold				

==== 2000 ====
Texas general election, 2000: Senate District 10
Party	Candidate	Votes	%	±%
Republican	Chris Harris (Incumbent)	187,302	100.00	0.00
Majority	187,302	100.00	0.00	
Turnout	187,302		+25.85	
Republican hold				

==== 1996 ====
Texas general election, 1996: Senate District 10
Party	Candidate	Votes	%	±%
Republican	Chris Harris (Incumbent)	154,989	100.00	0.00
Majority		154,989	100.00	0.00
Turnout		154,989		+19.83
Republican hold				

Republican primary, 1996: Senate District 10
Candidate		Votes	%	±
✓	Chris Harris (Incumbent)	30,330	77.80	
	Jim Lollar	8,656	22.20	
Majority		21,674	55.59	
Turnout		38,986		

==== 1994 ====
Texas general election, 1994: Senate District 10
Party	Candidate	Votes	%	±%
Republican	Chris Harris (Incumbent)	129,343	100.00	+38.64
Majority		129,343	100.00	+77.27
Turnout		129,343		−40.30
Republican hold				

==== 1992 ====
Texas general election, 1992: Senate District 10
Party	Candidate	Votes	%	±%
Democratic	Bob Bass	83,711	38.64	
Republican	Chris Harris (Incumbent)	132,947	61.36	
Majority		49,236	22.73	
Turnout		216,658		
Republican hold				

Texas House of Representatives
Preceded by Roy E. English	Member of the Texas House of Representatives from District 93 (Arlington)^{(1)} 1985–1991	Succeeded by Toby R. Goodman
Texas Senate
Preceded by Bob McFarland	Texas State Senator from District 10 (Arlington); 1991–2005	Succeeded by Kim Brimer
Preceded by Jane Nelson	Texas State Senator from District 9 (Arlington); 2005-2013	Succeeded by Kelly Hancock
Notes and references
1. For the 69th and 70th Legislatures, Harris’ home city was Mansfield
