= Chris Turner (Texas politician) =

American politician

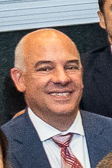

Minority Leader of the Texas House of Representatives
- In office January 13, 2015 – January 10, 2023
- Preceded by: Craig Eiland
- Succeeded by: Trey Martinez Fischer

Member of the Texas House of Representatives from the 101st district
- Incumbent
- Assumed office January 8, 2013
- Preceded by: Cindy Burkett

Member of the Texas House of Representatives from the 96th district
- In office January 13, 2009 – January 11, 2011
- Preceded by: Bill Zedler
- Succeeded by: Bill Zedler

Personal details
- Born: October 10, 1972 (age 53) Dallas, Texas, U.S.
- Party: Democratic
- Spouse: Lisa
- Education: University of Texas, Austin (BA)
- Profession: Public Relations Consultant
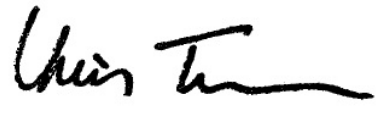
- Signature
- Website: Campaign website

Christopher G. Turner (born October 10, 1972) is an American politician who has served in the Texas House of Representatives as a Democrat since 2013, representing the 101st district. Turner previously represented the 96th district from 2009 to 2011.

== Political career ==
Turner previously worked for former Congressman Chet Edwards, and had a career as a public relations consultant.

=== Texas House of Representatives ===
Turner was elected chair of the House Democratic Caucus in 2013, a position he held until 2023. Texas Democrats considered Turner a potential future statewide candidate.

Representative Turner currently serves on the Redistricting (serving as vice chair), State Affairs, Sustainable Property Tax Relief - Select Study, and Ways and Means Committees.

He would narrowly lose re-nomination in the March 2026 Democratic primary to Grand Prairie Mayor Pro Tem Junior Ezeonu.

Texas House of Representatives
Preceded by Yvonne Davis	Minority Leader of the Texas House of Representatives; 2017–2023	Succeeded by Trey Martinez Fischer
