= Dan Huberty =

American businessman and politician

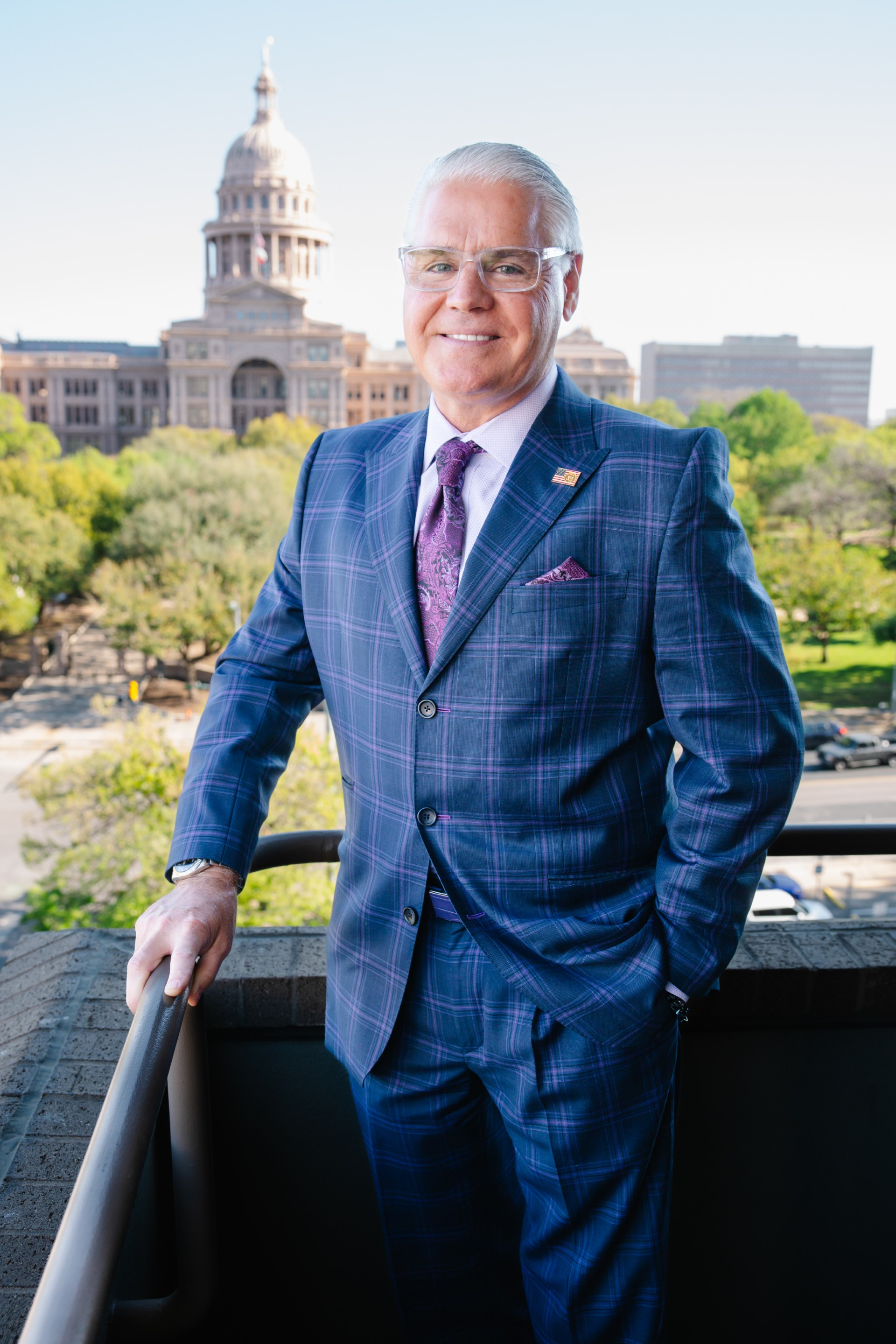

Member of the Texas House of Representatives from the 127th district
- In office January 11, 2011 – January 10, 2023
- Preceded by: Joe Crabb
- Succeeded by: Charles Cunningham

Personal details
- Born: June 21, 1968 (age 58) Parma, Ohio, U.S.
- Party: Republican
- Spouse: Janet Marie Etterman
- Children: 3
- Education: Cleveland State University (BBA); University of Phoenix (MBA)
- Occupation: Businessman

Daniel G. Huberty (June 21, 1968) is an American businessman and politician who was a Republican member of the Texas House of Representatives for District 127 in Harris County from 2011 to 2023.

Huberty ran unopposed for his third term in the state House in the general election on November 4, 2014. He won the Republican primary held on March 1, 2016.

== Early life and education ==
Huberty is a native of Parma, Ohio, a suburb south of Cleveland. In 1991, he received a Bachelor of Business Administration degree from Cleveland State University in downtown Cleveland. In 1998, he received a Master of Business Administration degree from the University of Phoenix.

Huberty was formerly president of The Parking REIT, a real estate investment trust, which is owned by Michael Shustek, a Las Vegas-based real estate investor; the trust formed in 2017 from the merger of MVP REIT I and MVP REIT II.

== Political career ==
Huberty, of Humble, Texas, was first elected to the Texas House of Representatives in 2011. Before being elected to the state House, he had been a member of the Humble Independent School District school board for five years, including serving board president in his last year.

During the 86th legislative session, Huberty served his second term as chairman of the House Committee on Public Education. He also served on the House Committee on County Affairs. He authored twelve bills which were signed by the Governor including House Bill 3 (2019), an education bill.

In 2016, Huberty was challenged in the Republican primary by Mitchell Bosworth. Huberty won, 78% to 22%. Huberty defeated challengers from the Libertarian Party and Green Party in the 2016 general election, taking 82% of the vote.

In 2018, Reginald Grant initially ran against Huberty in the Republican primary; a state judge ruled that Grant was ineligible because he did not meet the residency requirements for the district, although his named remained on the ballot. In the general election, Huberty won a fifth term with 44,595 (80.2%), defeating Libertarian candidate Ryan Woods, who polled 10,981 (19.8%).

=== DUI arrest ===
On April 23, 2021, Huberty was arrested for driving under the influence in Montgomery County after crashing his vehicle into another car and failing a sobriety test. At the time, Huberty was driving home from the State Capitol. He bonded out after the arrest, and the following day he issued an apology on Facebook and said he would seek treatment for alcoholism. In a subsequent speech on the House floor, Huberty said he had struggled with alcohol addiction all his adult life and was in a twelve-step program.

== Career after state House ==
After leaving the state House in 2022, Huberty became chief executive officer of MoakCasey, an education consulting firm in Austin, Texas. In 2023, Huberty opened Capitol Cafe, and is the owner of its two locations in Austin, TX.

Additionally, Huberty became an Associate Professor of Instruction at the Lyndon B Johnson School of Public Affairs at the University of Texas at Austin in 2025.

== Personal life ==
Huberty and his wife, the former Janet Marie Etterman, have three children. They are members of Saint Martha's Roman Catholic Church parish in Kingwood/Porter, Texas.

Texas House of Representatives
Preceded by Joe Crabb	Texas State Representative for District 127 (Harris County); 2011–	Succeeded by Incumbent
