= Texas's 96th House of Representatives district =

Electoral district of Texas

Texas's 96th State House of Representatives district
Representative
David Cook; R–Mansfield

District 96 is a district in the Texas House of Representatives. It has been represented by Republican David Cook since 2021.

== Geography ==
The district contains parts of the Tarrant County.

== Members ==
- Michael D. Millsap (until 1989)
- Kim Brimer (1989–2003)
- Bill Zedler (2003–2009)
- Chris Turner (2009–2011)
- Bill Zedler (2011–2021)
- David Cook (since 2021)
