= Wendy Davis (politician) =

American politician (born 1963)

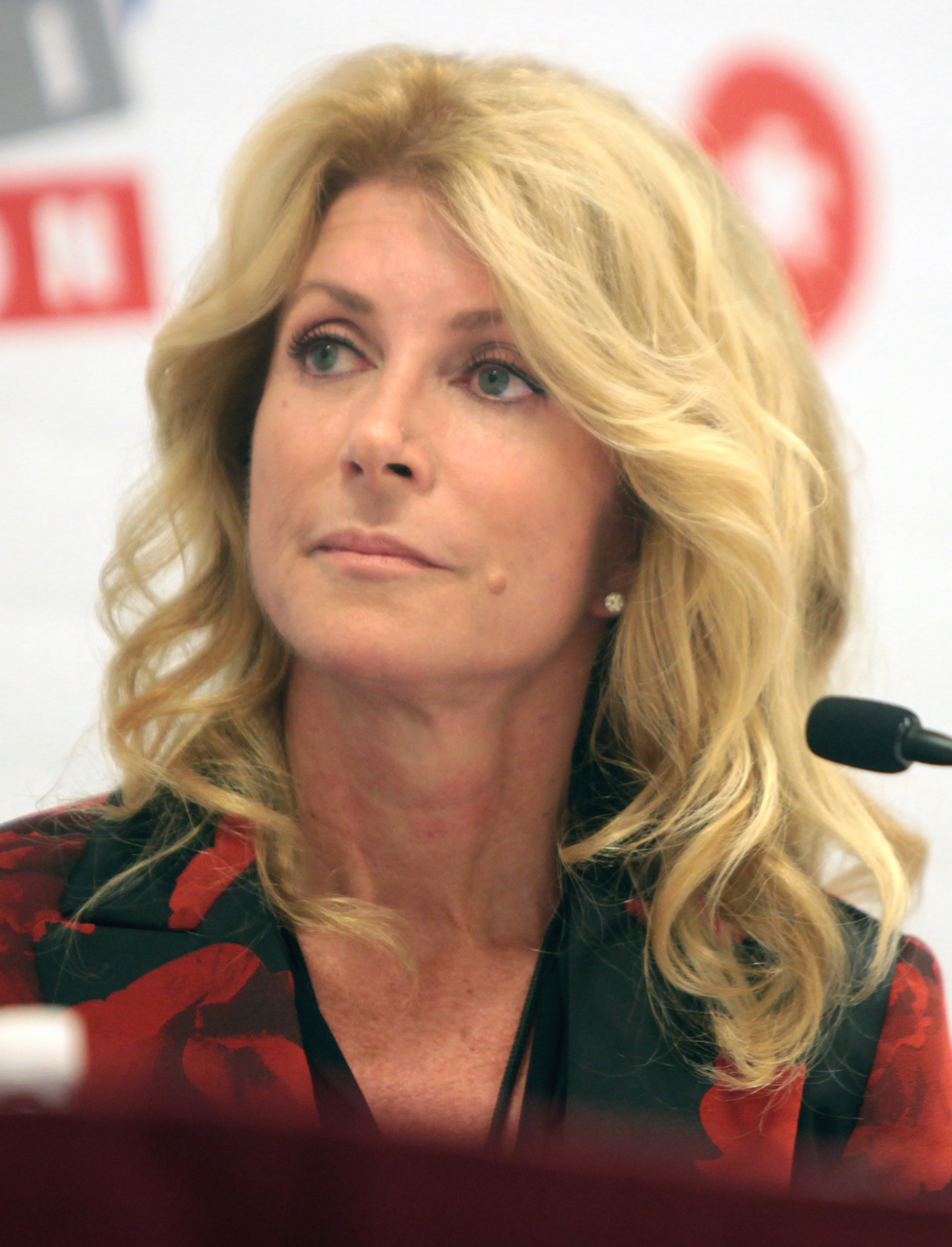

Member of the Texas Senate from the 10th district
- In office January 9, 2009 – January 13, 2015
- Preceded by: Kim Brimer
- Succeeded by: Konni Burton

Member of the Fort Worth City Council from the 9th district
- In office May 1, 1999 – January 8, 2008
- Preceded by: Cathy Hirt
- Succeeded by: Joel Burns

Personal details
- Born: Wendy Jean Russell; May 16, 1963 (age 63) West Warwick, Rhode Island, U.S.
- Party: Republican (before 2006); Democratic (2006–present)
- Spouses: Frank Underwood (m. 1982; div. 1984); Jeff Davis (m. 1987; div. 2005); Alan Schoenbaum (m. 2019)
- Children: 2
- Education: University of Texas, Arlington (attended); Tarrant County College (attended); Texas Christian University (BA); Harvard University (JD)

Wendy Russell Davis (born Wendy Jean Russell; May 16, 1963) is an American lawyer and politician from Fort Worth, Texas. A member of the Democratic Party, Davis represented the 10th district in the Texas Senate from 2009 to 2015. She previously served on the Fort Worth City Council.

On June 25, 2013, Davis held a thirteen-hour-long filibuster to block Senate Bill 5, a measure which included more restrictive abortion regulations for Texas. The filibuster played a major role in Senate Democrats' success in delaying passage of the bill beyond the midnight deadline for the end of the legislative session, though it ultimately passed in a second session. The filibuster brought Davis national attention, leading to speculation about a run for governor of Texas. She subsequently ran for governor of Texas in 2014, but was defeated by Republican Party nominee Greg Abbott by 59% to 38%.

On July 22, 2019, Davis announced she would run for Texas's 21st congressional district in 2020. She lost the election to Republican Chip Roy.

== Early life, education, and family ==
Wendy Davis was born Wendy Jean Russell in West Warwick, Rhode Island, the daughter of Virginia "Ginger" (née Stovall) and Jerry Russell. Her family moved to Fort Worth, Texas in 1973, when she was 10 years old. When Russell was 13, her parents divorced. Her father quit his job to pursue work in community theater, leading his child support payments to evaporate. Her mother, who had a ninth grade education, supported her four children by working menial jobs.

When Davis was 17 and still in high school, she moved in with her boyfriend, construction worker Frank Underwood. In 1981, she graduated from Richland High School as a member of the National Honor Society. She married Underwood on January 24, 1982, and gave birth to her first daughter, Amber, later that year. When she was 19, she and Underwood separated. She filed for divorce from Underwood in December 1983, and the divorce became official on May 22, 1984, when she was 21. She was given custody of Amber, with Underwood paying child support.

Davis attended University of Texas at Arlington for one semester, but left the school for financial reasons. While waiting tables in 1983, she was introduced by her father to lawyer and former city councilman Jeffry R. Davis, who would become her second husband. The couple eventually married on May 30, 1987 and settled in a historic home in the Mistletoe Heights neighborhood of Fort Worth.

Davis attended a two-year paralegal program at Tarrant County College from 1984 to 1986. She enrolled at Texas Christian University (TCU) in 1986 on an academic scholarship and a Pell Grant. Following her second marriage, her husband began to make significant financial contributions to her education. He would ultimately adopt her daughter, Amber. A second daughter, Dru, was born in September 1988. Davis underwent abortions for two later pregnancies that would not survive and/or would kill her: one (whom she named "Lucas") due to an ectopic tubal pregnancy and another (whom she named "Tate Elise") due to the fetus suffering from Dandy–Walker syndrome.

In May 1990, Davis graduated from TCU with a Bachelor of Arts degree in English. That autumn, she relocated to Lexington, Massachusetts, with her daughters to attend Harvard Law School. This living situation proved untenable; after four months, her daughters returned to Texas to live with her husband. Davis's mother helped to care for her daughters, and Davis flew back to Texas regularly to visit her family for the remainder of her time at Harvard. While at Harvard, she volunteered at a legal clinic for the poor, where she helped AIDS patients write living wills and surviving partners with their legal rights. In May 1993, she earned her J.D. degree cum laude, and she was admitted to the State Bar of Texas in November 1993.

In November 2003, Jeff and Wendy Davis separated. When the divorce settlement was finalized in 2005, the former couple shared "joint conservatorship" over Dru, who primarily lived with her father in the family home; Wendy Davis agreed to pay $1,200 a month in child support.

== Law career ==
After graduating from law school, Davis was law clerk to U.S. District Judge Jerry Buchmeyer of the Northern District of Texas in Dallas from 1993 to 1994. She worked as an attorney at Haynes & Boone (practicing litigation). In 1999, Davis's then-husband, Jeff Davis, started Safeco Title Co. of Fort Worth, Texas, and she became part owner. The title company was sold to First American Title as part of their divorce decree, and Davis continued to work at the Fort Worth branch of First American Title until 2009. Davis was of counsel at Cantey Hanger from March 2010 to December 31, 2013. She partnered with Brian Newby to open Newby Davis, PLLC in March 2010.

During her time working for the Safeco title company, Davis was paid an annual salary of $40,000 by her husband Jeff Davis. Jeff Davis told Robert Draper of the New York Times Magazine that he paid her the salary for her work for the city of Fort Worth as a council member, a job that paid little.

== Political career ==
=== City Council ===
Davis first ran for the Fort Worth City Council in 1996, but was defeated by ninety votes. After her defeat, Davis sued the Fort Worth Star-Telegram, American Broadcasting Company, and the Disney Company, which at the time owned the Star-Telegram and ABC. The Texas Tribune stated that she alleged "that biased coverage led to her defeat and caused injury to her physical and mental health". Her claims were rejected by the Texas courts, based upon the Star-Telegram's First Amendment free speech grounds.

Subsequently, in 1999, Davis was elected to the Fort Worth City Council. During her nine-year tenure there, Davis focused on transportation, economic development, and neighborhood issues. She also worked on economic development projects, such as the Montgomery Plaza renovation, the Tower, Pier One and Radio Shack campuses.

==== Republican politics ====
While serving on the Fort Worth City Council, Davis voted in Republican primaries. (Municipal elections in Texas are nonpartisan, so her affiliation was not indicated on the ballot when she ran for City Council.) Davis has said that she was then a Republican because she liked Republican Congresswoman Kay Granger of Fort Worth, and she wanted to vote on judicial nominees in Republican primaries. She voted in the Republican primaries in 1996, 1998 and 2006 and she has given $1,500 to Granger. Also, in April 1999, she gave $250 to George W. Bush's first presidential campaign.

=== State Senate ===
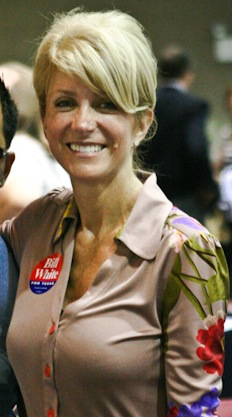
As a Texas State Senator

In 2008, running as a Democrat, Davis narrowly defeated incumbent Republican Senator Kim Brimer for Texas's 10th Senate district, which includes portions of Tarrant County, Texas, despite a legal challenge against her candidacy by the state Republican Party. Davis was re-elected in 2012, defeating a challenge from Mark M. Shelton, a Fort Worth pediatrician and Republican member of the Texas House of Representatives, who would seek the 10th district seat again in 2014. Davis was the vice-chair on the Senate Select Committee on Open Government. She was also a Member of the Senate Committee on Economic Development, the Senate Committee on Transportation, and the Veteran Affairs and Military Installations Committee. She had previously served on the Senate Committee for Education and as vice-chair on the Senate Committee on International Relations and Trade.

On May 29, 2011, Davis launched a filibuster of a budget bill that cut $4 billion from public education in the state, resulting in a special session called by Texas Gov. Rick Perry.

In 2009, Texas Monthly named her "Rookie of the Year". She was also chosen by the readers of Fort Worth Weekly as the "Best Servant of the People". In January 2012, Davis was listed among "12 State Legislators to Watch in 2012" by Governing magazine and was mentioned as a possible candidate for statewide races.

Early in the 83rd Session, senators drew for terms in a post-redistricting, once-a-decade process. Davis drew a two-year term and was up for re-election in November 2014. In March 2013, she announced her intention to run for re-election to the Senate. On October 3, 2013, she changed her mind and announced a candidacy for governor of Texas instead of re-election to the State Senate.

==== 2013 filibuster ====
On June 25, 2013, Davis performed a filibuster to block Senate Bill 5, a proposal to ban abortions after 20 weeks of pregnancy, require abortion clinics to meet the same standards that hospital-style surgical centers do, and mandate that a doctor who performs abortions have admitting privileges at a nearby hospital. She attempted to hold the floor until midnight, when the Senate's special session ended, after which it would no longer be able to vote on the measure. Following an 11-hour filibuster—ending three hours short of midnight—Lieutenant Governor David Dewhurst ruled that Davis had gone off topic, forcing a vote on whether the filibuster could continue. Despite Republican efforts, parliamentary inquiries from Leticia R. Van de Putte and others as well as raucous cheering and yelling from the political activists gathered in the Capitol carried on through midnight and the close of the special session. Following the deadline, Republicans indicated that a vote had taken place and passed, while Democrats declared that the vote had taken place after midnight, making it void. Dewhurst later conceded that the bill was dead.

The next day, Governor Rick Perry called for a second special session to allow for another attempt to pass the abortion restrictions, as well as to address other issues. The bill was eventually passed by both the House and the Senate in the July 2013 second special session, prompting one commentator to state that "Wendy Davis won the battle, but Rick Perry won the war." The bill was signed by Gov. Rick Perry on July 18, 2013.

The filibuster attracted national attention, including from The New York Times and The Washington Post. National fundraising by and speculation about a gubernatorial run for Davis also followed. She was encouraged to run by groups like Battleground Texas and EMILY's List.

During the filibuster, Davis wore hot pink sneakers known as Mizuno Wave Rider 16. Following the filibuster, the sneakers became "the bestselling shoe on Amazon.com and an unlikely feminist symbol". Davis's sneakers gained national attention.

=== Campaign for Governor of Texas ===
On October 3, 2013, Davis announced her intention to run for Governor of Texas in the 2014 gubernatorial election. On March 4, 2014, she won the Democratic nomination with 432,065 votes (79.1 percent), defeating her only challenger, Reynaldo "Ray" Madrigal, who received 114,458 votes (20.9 percent). Davis was the first female nominee for Texas governor since the defeat of Gov. Ann Richards in 1994 by George W. Bush. In the election on November 4, 2014, she lost to Republican nominee Greg Abbott, the then-outgoing Texas Attorney General.

In January 2014, Wayne Slater of The Dallas Morning News reported that the personal history Davis had been sharing on the campaign trail "blurred" some facts. In particular, Slater said Davis did not divorce until she was 21 (not 19 as she had claimed), that she only lived in her family's mobile home for a few months after the divorce, and that she had been financially supported by her second husband while at TCU and Harvard. Davis acknowledged the errors and said, "My language should be tighter". Amid the controversy, Davis' daughters each released letters in defense of their mother.

In August 2014, Davis released her first campaign ad, entitled "A Texas Story." The ad attacked her rival, Abbott, for a Texas Supreme Court decision from which he had dissented. Diane Reese of The Washington Post called the advertisement "character assassination and fear-mongering".

In October 2014, a Davis campaign ad was described by Aaron Blake of The Washington Post as "one of the nastiest campaign ads you will ever see." The ad attacked Abbott as being hypocritical for receiving monies from an accident which incapacitated him, and then, as attorney general, supporting litigation limits on such payments. Mother Jones called the ad "offensive and nasty". MSNBC stated that the advertisement is probably "a hail mary effort" because Davis was trailing Abbott by double digits in the polls.

In November 2014, Salon journalist Jenny Kutner reported that American Thinker writer Deborah C. Tyler came up with a last-minute nickname for then-gubernatorial candidate Davis, a "gynecist", a term Kutner felt was meant to be derogatory by Tyler, but according to Kutner, "actually sounds kind of awesome once she starts describing what it means: Gynecism promotes the political position that the primary and most essential power a female can hold is the control of her own sexual and genital functions."

On November 4, 2014, Davis lost the gubernatorial race to Abbott, 59%-38%. According to exit polls, she received the support of only 47% of female voters in Texas.

=== Campaign for Congress ===
On July 22, 2019, Davis announced her candidacy for the United States House of Representatives to represent Texas's 21st congressional district against incumbent Chip Roy. On November 3, 2020, Davis was defeated, winning two of the ten counties in the district.

== Political positions ==
Upon examining Davis' voting record over her three terms in the Texas Senate, Mark P. Jones, the Chairman of the Department of Political Science at Rice University in Houston, concluded that Davis was the fourth most liberal senator out of the 31 state senators who served during at least two of the three terms during which Davis had served. Jones found that she was "significantly more liberal" than John Whitmire, Juan Hinojosa, Carlos Uresti, and Eddie Lucio Jr., who represent the centrist wing of the Texas Senate Democrats, "significantly more conservative" than José R. Rodríguez, the most liberal Texas Senate Democrat, and "statistically indistinguishable" from the other six Texas Senate Democrats.

=== Abortion ===
In 2009 and 2011, Davis voted against a bill that requires physicians to perform a sonogram on and provide other information to abortion patients prior to an abortion. In 2011, she would also vote against a bill that requires an ultrasound prior to an abortion.

On June 25, 2013, Davis held an eleven hour long filibuster to block Senate Bill 5, a measure which included more restrictive abortion regulations for Texas. The filibuster played a major role in Senate Democrats' efforts to delay passage of the bill beyond the midnight deadline for the end of the legislative session, though the bill ultimately passed in a second session.

In October 2013, Davis campaign spokesman Bo Delp said, "Like most Texans, Sen. Davis opposes late-term abortions except when the life or health of the mother is endangered, in cases of rape or incest or in the case of severe and irreversible fetal abnormalities". Also in October 2013, EMILY's List endorsed Wendy Davis for governor in 2014.

On February 11, 2014, Davis said that she would have supported a ban on abortions after 20 weeks of pregnancy, if the law adequately deferred to a woman and her doctor. She said she found the ban on abortions after 20 weeks to be the "least objectionable" provision in the abortion bill she had filibustered during the previous year.

=== Firearms ===
While on the Fort Worth City Council, Davis supported gun restrictions, including restrictions for gun shows at city facilities.

On February 6, 2014, Davis expressed support for a proposed open carry gun law in Texas, which was banned under Texas state law. She also said that background checks and training requirements would "help ensure that only mentally stable, law-abiding citizens" could carry weapons. She later said that she believed municipalities should be able to decide whether the proposed open carry and existing concealed carry laws would apply within their boundaries. After losing the 2014 gubernatorial election, Davis stated that she opposed open carry laws.

=== LGBT rights ===
In 2000, Davis voted for Fort Worth's nondiscrimination ordinance based on sexual orientation.

In January 2014, Human Rights Campaign endorsed Wendy Davis for governor. On February 13, 2014, she expressed support for same-sex marriage and said that Attorney General Greg Abbott, her presumed general-election opponent in the race for governor, should stop defending the state's ban on same-sex marriage.

=== Cannabis ===
On February 11, 2014, Davis expressed support for decriminalizing cannabis. She said she would back legislation to decrease criminal provisions for possession of small amounts of cannabis and believes medical cannabis should be left to the voters.

== Electoral history ==
=== City council elections ===
==== 1999 ====
Fort Worth City Council general election, 1999: District 9
Party	Candidate	Votes	%
nonpartisan	Wendy Davis	1,820	50.75
nonpartisan	David Minor	1,471	41.02
nonpartisan	Dan Roberts	295	8.23

==== 2003 ====
Fort Worth City Council general election, 2003: District 9
Party	Candidate	Votes	%
nonpartisan	Wendy Davis	2,581	68.21
nonpartisan	Bill Ray	1,203	31.79

==== 2007 ====
Fort Worth City Council general election, 2007: District 9
Party	Candidate	Votes	%
nonpartisan	Wendy Davis	1,330	76.61
nonpartisan	Bernie Scheffler	406	23.39

=== State Senate elections ===
==== 2008 ====
Texas general election, 2008: Senate District 10
Party	Candidate	Votes	%
Democratic	Wendy Davis	147,832	49.91
Republican	Kim Brimer (incumbent)	140,737	47.52
Libertarian	Richard A. Cross	7,591	2.56
Democratic gain from Republican			

==== 2012 ====
Texas general election, 2012: Senate District 10
Party	Candidate	Votes	%
Democratic	Wendy Davis (incumbent)	147,103	51.12
Republican	Mark Shelton	140,656	48.87
Democratic hold			

=== 2014 gubernatorial election ===
Texas gubernatorial election, 2014: Governor
Party	Candidate	Votes	%
Republican	Greg Abbott	2,790,227	59.25
Democratic	Wendy Davis	1,832,254	38.91
Libertarian	Kathie Glass	66,413	1.14
Green	Brandon Parmer	18,494	0.39
Independent	Sarah M. Pavitt	1,168	0.02
Republican hold			

=== U.S. House of Representatives ===
Texas's 21st congressional district, 2020
Party	Candidate	Votes	%
Republican	Chip Roy	235,740	52.0
Democratic	Wendy Davis	205,780	45.4
Libertarian	Arthur DiBianca	8,666	1.9
Green	Thomas Wakely	3,564	0.8
Total votes		453,750	100.0
Republican hold			

== Published works ==
- Davis, Wendy (2014). Forgetting to Be Afraid: A Memoir. Blue Rider Press. ISBN 978-0399170577.

== In popular culture ==
- Novelist Casey McQuiston has said that the fictional president in Red, White & Royal Blue (2019) is based on Davis.

Party political offices
Preceded by Bill White	Democratic nominee for Governor of Texas; 2014	Succeeded by Lupe Valdez
