= 2006 Texas House of Representatives election =

- November 7, 2006

All 150 seats in the Texas House of Representatives 76 seats needed for a majority
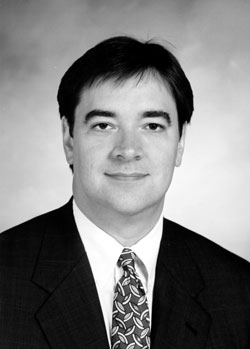
	Majority party	Minority party	Third party
	Rep		Lib
Leader	Tom Craddick	Jim Dunnam
Party	Republican	Democratic	Libertarian
Leader since	January 9, 1973	January 14, 2003
Leader's seat	82nd	57th
Last election	87 seats, 61.74%	63 seats, 37.35%	0 seats, 0.68%
Seats before	86	64	0
Seats won	81	69	0
Seat change	▼5	▲5	Steady
Popular vote	2,094,435	1,585,173	231,098
Percentage	53.52%	40.51%	5.90%
Swing	▼8.22%	▲3.16%	▲5.22%
- Republican hold Democratic hold Democratic gain Republican: 40–50% 50–60% 60–70% 70–80% 80–90% ≥90% Democratic: 40–50% 50–60% 60–70% 70–80% 80–90% ≥90%
Speaker before election
Tom Craddick
Republican
Elected Speaker
Tom Craddick
Republican

The 2006 Texas House of Representatives elections took place as part of the biennial United States elections. Texas voters elected state representatives in all 150 State House of Representatives districts. The winners of this election served in the 80th Texas Legislature. State representatives serve for two-year terms. Republicans maintained control of the House, losing five seats to the Democrats.

== Background ==
Following the 2002 elections, the Republicans gained control of the House, giving them a governmental trifecta for the first time since Reconstruction. Democrats gained a net of one seat back from the Republicans in the 2004 elections, holding onto many rural districts that Republicans had targeted.

== Special Elections ==
District 48: A special election was held on January 7, 2006, to fill the unexpired term of Rep. Todd Baxter, who resigned on November 1, 2005. Democrat Donna Howard received 49.46% in the special election, narrowly missing the 50% mark needed to win outright, so she faced Republican Ben Bentzin in the runoff on February 14, 2006. Howard won the runoff with 57.62%, flipping the district.

Texas's 48th state house district special election
Party	Candidate	Votes	%
Democratic	Donna Howard	6,705	49.46%
Republican	Ben Bentzin	5,125	37.81%
Democratic	Kathy Rider	1,416	10.45%
Libertarian	Ben Easton	310	2.29%
Total votes		13,556	100.00%

Texas's 48th state house district special election runoff
Party	Candidate	Votes	%
Democratic	Donna Howard	12,620	57.62%
Republican	Ben Bentzin	9,284	42.38%
Total votes		21,904	100.00%
Democratic gain from Republican			

== Predictions ==
Analysts did not consider the Texas House to be a competitive legislative chamber.

Source	Ranking	As of
The Rothenberg Political Report	Safe R	July 7, 2006

== Results ==
Democrats gained a net of five seats from the Republicans.

=== Statewide ===
Party	Candi-dates	Votes	%	Seats	+/–
Republican Party	107	2,094,435	53.52%	81	▼5
Democratic Party	113	1,585,173	40.51%	69	▲5
Libertarian Party	88	231,098	5.90%	0	–
Write-in	1	2,690	0.07%	0	–
Total		3,913,396	100.00%	150	–

Popular vote
Republican	53.52%
Democratic	40.51%
Libertarian	5.90%
Write-in	0.07%

House seats won
Republican	54.00%
Democratic	46.00%

=== Results by district ===
District	Democratic		Republican		Others		Total		Result
District	Votes	%	Votes	%	Votes	%	Votes	%	Result
District 1	21,841	86.79%	-	-	3,324	13.21%	25,165	100.00%	Democratic hold
District 2	11,926	37.14%	18,783	58.49%	1,404	4.37%	32,113	100.00%	Republican hold
District 3	19,632	58.32%	14,032	41.68%	-	-	33,664	100.00%	Democratic hold
District 4	13,128	36.22%	21,547	59.45%	1,567	4.32%	36,242	100.00%	Republican hold
District 5	-	-	26,286	81.94%	5,795	18.06%	32,081	100.00%	Republican hold
District 6	-	-	25,496	100.00%	-	-	25,496	100.00%	Republican hold
District 7	8,701	28.61%	20,810	68.44%	897	2.95%	30,408	100.00%	Republican hold
District 8	12,938	42.14%	17,767	57.86%	-	-	30,705	100.00%	Republican hold
District 9	-	-	20,838	100.00%	-	-	20,838	100.00%	Republican hold
District 10	12,516	33.19%	25,196	66.81%	-	-	37,712	100.00%	Republican hold
District 11	17,603	51.00%	15,918	46.11%	998	2.89%	34,519	100.00%	Democratic hold
District 12	20,747	55.58%	15,707	42.08%	873	2.34%	37,327	100.00%	Democratic hold
District 13	-	-	24,170	82.84%	5,006	17.16%	29,176	100.00%	Republican hold
District 14	-	-	22,056	100.00%	-	-	22,056	100.00%	Republican hold
District 15	9,597	22.79%	30,880	73.33%	1,633	3.88%	42,110	100.00%	Republican hold
District 16	7,963	24.96%	23,945	75.04%	-	-	31,908	100.00%	Republican hold
District 17	19,640	48.92%	19,225	47.89%	1,283	3.20%	40,148	100.00%	Democratic hold
District 18	-	-	19,153	76.00%	6,048	24.00%	25,201	100.00%	Republican hold
District 19	11,957	42.64%	16,082	57.36%	-	-	28,039	100.00%	Republican hold
District 20	18,006	36.62%	31,158	63.38%	-	-	49,164	100.00%	Republican hold
District 21	20,811	100.00%	-	-	-	-	20,811	100.00%	Democratic hold
District 22	14,516	90.75%	-	-	1,479	9.25%	15,995	100.00%	Democratic hold
District 23	22,618	83.80%	-	-	4,374	16.20%	26,992	100.00%	Democratic hold
District 24	-	-	24,992	77.69%	7,176	22.31%	32,168	100.00%	Republican hold
District 25	-	-	21,867	100.00%	-	-	21,867	100.00%	Republican hold
District 26	-	-	26,374	100.00%	-	-	26,374	100.00%	Republican hold
District 27	20,898	60.80%	13,475	39.20%	-	-	34,373	100.00%	Democratic hold
District 28	14,760	37.04%	25,094	62.96%	-	-	39,854	100.00%	Republican hold
District 29	13,908	39.59%	21,221	60.41%	-	-	35,129	100.00%	Republican hold
District 30	-	-	24,725	100.00%	-	-	24,725	100.00%	Republican hold
District 31	12,711	100.00%	-	-	-	-	12,711	100.00%	Democratic hold
District 32	17,607	48.26%	16,840	46.16%	2,038	5.59%	36,485	100.00%	Democratic gain
District 33	14,154	52.08%	13,023	47.92%	-	-	27,177	100.00%	Democratic hold
District 34	17,561	78.41%	-	-	4,835	21.59%	22,396	100.00%	Democratic hold
District 35	16,042	52.69%	12,780	41.98%	1,623	5.33%	30,445	100.00%	Democratic hold
District 36	8,776	100.00%	-	-	-	-	8,776	100.00%	Democratic hold
District 37	10,113	100.00%	-	-	-	-	10,113	100.00%	Democratic hold
District 38	11,335	63.94%	5,054	28.51%	1,339	7.55%	17,728	100.00%	Democratic hold
District 39	8,122	100.00%	-	-	-	-	8,122	100.00%	Democratic hold
District 40	7,073	100.00%	-	-	-	-	7,073	100.00%	Democratic hold
District 41	9,794	100.00%	-	-	-	-	9,794	100.00%	Democratic hold
District 42	12,787	100.00%	-	-	-	-	12,787	100.00%	Democratic hold
District 43	12,164	100.00%	-	-	-	-	12,164	100.00%	Democratic hold
District 44	-	-	28,931	100.00%	-	-	28,931	100.00%	Republican hold
District 45	25,080	60.12%	14,949	35.84%	1,686	4.04%	41,715	100.00%	Democratic hold
District 46	17,343	85.34%	-	-	2,980	14.66%	20,323	100.00%	Democratic hold
District 47	26,975	50.24%	24,447	45.54%	2,265	4.22%	53,687	100.00%	Democratic gain
District 48	31,255	77.76%	-	-	8,939	22.24%	40,194	100.00%	Democratic hold
District 49	32,381	84.12%	-	-	6,111	15.88%	38,492	100.00%	Democratic hold
District 50	25,098	61.71%	13,681	33.64%	1,892	4.65%	40,671	100.00%	Democratic hold
District 51	13,521	85.72%	-	-	2,252	14.28%	15,773	100.00%	Democratic hold
District 52	16,520	44.21%	18,853	50.45%	1,998	5.35%	37,371	100.00%	Republican hold
District 53	-	-	30,966	85.32%	5,328	14.68%	36,294	100.00%	Republican hold
District 54	9,802	36.32%	16,314	60.45%	873	3.23%	26,989	100.00%	Republican hold
District 55	8,837	33.65%	17,428	66.35%	-	-	26,265	100.00%	Republican hold
District 56	-	-	27,961	78.73%	7,556	21.27%	35,517	100.00%	Republican hold
District 57	19,274	86.16%	-	-	3,097	13.84%	22,371	100.00%	Democratic hold
District 58	11,419	32.92%	21,766	62.76%	1,497	4.32%	34,682	100.00%	Republican hold
District 59	12,198	44.46%	15,235	55.54%	-	-	27,433	100.00%	Republican hold
District 60	10,645	29.53%	24,223	67.19%	1,185	3.29%	36,053	100.00%	Republican hold
District 61	-	-	27,470	80.40%	6,696	19.60%	34,166	100.00%	Republican hold
District 62	12,725	38.85%	20,031	61.15%	-	-	32,756	100.00%	Republican hold
District 63	-	-	31,958	100.00%	-	-	31,958	100.00%	Republican hold
District 64	12,888	40.08%	19,266	59.92%	-	-	32,154	100.00%	Republican hold
District 65	-	-	20,687	78.39%	5,704	21.61%	26,391	100.00%	Republican hold
District 66	-	-	24,399	80.34%	5,972	19.66%	30,371	100.00%	Republican hold
District 67	-	-	18,211	100.00%	-	-	18,211	100.00%	Republican hold
District 68	-	-	26,949	100.00%	-	-	26,949	100.00%	Republican hold
District 69	17,571	58.19%	11,966	39.63%	659	2.18%	30,196	100.00%	Democratic hold
District 70	12,265	28.16%	30,062	69.03%	1,222	2.81%	43,549	100.00%	Republican hold
District 71	12,547	40.14%	18,026	57.66%	687	2.20%	31,260	100.00%	Republican hold
District 72	-	-	19,334	81.46%	4,401	18.54%	23,735	100.00%	Republican hold
District 73	-	-	35,785	75.15%	11,832	24.85%	47,617	100.00%	Republican hold
District 74	19,324	100.00%	-	-	-	-	19,324	100.00%	Democratic hold
District 75	10,413	65.71%	5,435	34.29%	-	-	15,848	100.00%	Democratic hold
District 76	12,886	100.00%	-	-	-	-	12,886	100.00%	Democratic hold
District 77	11,375	100.00%	-	-	-	-	11,375	100.00%	Democratic hold
District 78	-	-	18,837	100.00%	-	-	18,837	100.00%	Republican hold
District 79	12,623	100.00%	-	-	-	-	12,623	100.00%	Democratic hold
District 80	15,466	100.00%	-	-	-	-	15,466	100.00%	Democratic hold
District 81	-	-	16,187	84.78%	2,907	15.22%	19,094	100.00%	Republican hold
District 82	-	-	24,187	100.00%	-	-	24,187	100.00%	Republican hold
District 83	10,161	26.71%	27,887	73.29%	-	-	38,048	100.00%	Republican hold
District 84	8,068	33.87%	15,751	66.13%	-	-	23,819	100.00%	Republican hold
District 85	14,323	49.01%	14,106	48.27%	793	2.71%	29,222	100.00%	Democratic hold
District 86	-	-	28,951	86.46%	4,532	13.54%	33,483	100.00%	Republican hold
District 87	-	-	16,993	100.00%	-	-	16,993	100.00%	Republican hold
District 88	-	-	24,044	85.00%	4,244	15.00%	28,288	100.00%	Republican hold
District 89	11,522	26.11%	30,841	69.88%	1,773	4.02%	44,136	100.00%	Republican hold
District 90	9,650	86.43%	-	-	1,515	13.57%	11,165	100.00%	Democratic hold
District 91	11,361	37.77%	17,770	59.07%	950	3.16%	30,081	100.00%	Republican hold
District 92	-	-	22,491	100.00%	-	-	22,491	100.00%	Republican hold
District 93	10,936	49.61%	10,349	46.95%	759	3.44%	22,044	100.00%	Democratic gain
District 94	11,147	32.49%	21,800	63.54%	1,363	3.97%	34,310	100.00%	Republican hold
District 95	18,259	90.53%	-	-	1,909	9.47%	20,168	100.00%	Democratic hold
District 96	16,483	44.30%	19,520	52.46%	1,206	3.24%	37,209	100.00%	Republican hold
District 97	16,908	40.82%	23,164	55.93%	1,344	3.25%	41,416	100.00%	Republican hold
District 98	-	-	36,509	83.59%	7,165	16.41%	43,674	100.00%	Republican hold
District 99	12,285	33.83%	22,906	63.07%	1,125	3.10%	36,316	100.00%	Republican hold
District 100	12,523	88.81%	-	-	1,578	11.19%	14,101	100.00%	Democratic hold
District 101	-	-	13,248	76.23%	4,132	23.77%	17,380	100.00%	Republican hold
District 102	11,613	45.81%	13,166	51.94%	571	2.25%	25,350	100.00%	Republican hold
District 103	7,702	83.40%	-	-	1,533	16.60%	9,235	100.00%	Democratic hold
District 104	7,906	85.47%	-	-	1,344	14.53%	9,250	100.00%	Democratic hold
District 105	8,865	41.10%	11,881	55.09%	822	3.81%	21,568	100.00%	Republican hold
District 106	10,224	48.06%	10,459	49.16%	591	2.78%	21,274	100.00%	Republican hold
District 107	16,254	50.11%	15,145	46.69%	1,038	3.20%	32,437	100.00%	Democratic gain
District 108	12,447	40.42%	17,244	55.99%	1,106	3.59%	30,797	100.00%	Republican hold
District 109	26,511	90.41%	-	-	2,811	9.59%	29,322	100.00%	Democratic hold
District 110	14,896	100.00%	-	-	-	-	14,896	100.00%	Democratic hold
District 111	21,462	73.74%	7,641	26.26%	-	-	29,103	100.00%	Democratic hold
District 112	-	-	21,068	77.95%	5,961	22.05%	27,029	100.00%	Republican hold
District 113	9,793	37.91%	15,242	59.00%	799	3.09%	25,834	100.00%	Republican hold
District 114	12,791	42.30%	16,808	55.59%	639	2.11%	30,238	100.00%	Republican hold
District 115	-	-	22,050	100.00%	-	-	22,050	100.00%	Republican hold
District 116	14,276	85.30%	-	-	2,461	14.70%	16,737	100.00%	Democratic hold
District 117	13,024	59.62%	8,820	40.38%	-	-	21,844	100.00%	Democratic hold
District 118	10,982	48.24%	10,082	44.29%	1,701	7.47%	22,765	100.00%	Democratic hold
District 119	14,818	100.00%	-	-	-	-	14,818	100.00%	Democratic hold
District 120	14,563	85.83%	-	-	2,404	14.17%	16,967	100.00%	Democratic hold
District 121	-	-	26,836	77.44%	7,816	22.56%	34,652	100.00%	Republican hold
District 122	16,651	29.42%	37,625	66.47%	2,325	4.11%	56,601	100.00%	Republican hold
District 123	14,659	84.60%	-	-	2,668	15.40%	17,327	100.00%	Democratic hold
District 124	13,687	64.46%	7,546	35.54%	-	-	21,233	100.00%	Democratic hold
District 125	14,466	57.72%	9,516	37.97%	1,082	4.32%	25,064	100.00%	Democratic hold
District 126	9,114	32.59%	18,112	64.77%	736	2.63%	27,962	100.00%	Republican hold
District 127	14,305	39.86%	20,773	57.88%	814	2.27%	35,892	100.00%	Republican hold
District 128	-	-	15,327	100.00%	-	-	15,327	100.00%	Republican hold
District 129	14,397	42.33%	19,616	57.67%	-	-	34,013	100.00%	Republican hold
District 130	-	-	29,860	83.41%	5,941	16.59%	35,801	100.00%	Republican hold
District 131	14,379	94.59%	-	-	823	5.41%	15,202	100.00%	Democratic hold
District 132	-	-	21,221	82.42%	4,527	17.58%	25,748	100.00%	Republican hold
District 133	8,750	41.74%	11,693	55.77%	522	2.49%	20,965	100.00%	Republican hold
District 134	25,219	54.54%	20,005	43.26%	1,018	2.20%	46,242	100.00%	Democratic gain
District 135	-	-	16,083	100.00%	-	-	16,083	100.00%	Republican hold
District 136	9,976	29.10%	23,392	68.24%	910	2.65%	34,278	100.00%	Republican hold
District 137	5,201	57.83%	3,792	42.17%	-	-	8,993	100.00%	Democratic hold
District 138	8,286	38.72%	12,504	58.43%	610	2.85%	21,400	100.00%	Republican hold
District 139	13,969	100.00%	-	-	-	-	13,969	100.00%	Democratic hold
District 140	6,168	100.00%	-	-	-	-	6,168	100.00%	Democratic hold
District 141	12,926	100.00%	-	-	-	-	12,926	100.00%	Democratic hold
District 142	15,025	93.56%	-	-	1,035	6.44%	16,060	100.00%	Democratic hold
District 143	6,026	70.64%	2,218	26.00%	286	3.35%	8,530	100.00%	Democratic hold
District 144	8,017	40.57%	11,125	56.29%	620	3.14%	19,762	100.00%	Republican hold
District 145	7,773	100.00%	-	-	-	-	7,773	100.00%	Democratic hold
District 146	19,812	90.55%	-	-	2,068	9.45%	21,880	100.00%	Democratic hold
District 147	17,273	100.00%	-	-	-	-	17,273	100.00%	Democratic hold
District 148	12,790	84.27%	-	-	2,387	15.73%	15,177	100.00%	Democratic hold
District 149	12,621	54.28%	10,632	45.72%	-	-	23,253	100.00%	Democratic hold
District 150	9,554	29.73%	22,585	70.27%	-	-	32,139	100.00%	Republican hold
Total	1,585,173	40.51%	2,094,435	53.52%	233,788	5.97%	3,913,396	100.00%	

== House race summary, Districts 1–25 ==
District	Party	Incumbent	Status	Party	Candidate	Votes	%	Change from 2004
1	Democratic	Stephen J. Frost	Reelected	Democratic	Stephen J. Frost	21,841	86.79	+33.99
1	Democratic	Stephen J. Frost	Reelected	Libertarian	Tim Eason	3,324	13.20	+13.20
2	Republican	Dan Flynn	Reelected	Republican	Dan Flynn	18,783	58.49	−41.51
2	Republican	Dan Flynn	Reelected	Democratic	Scott Cornuaud	11,926	37.13	+37.13
2	Republican	Dan Flynn	Reelected	Libertarian	Dawn M. Childs	1,404	4.37	+4.37
3	Democratic	Mark S. Homer	Reelected	Republican	Kirby Hollingsworth	14,032	41.68	−8.09
3	Democratic	Mark S. Homer	Reelected	Democratic	Mark S. Homer	19,632	58.31	+8.09
4	Republican	Betty Brown	Reelected	Republican	Betty Brown	21,547	59.45	−40.55
4	Republican	Betty Brown	Reelected	Democratic	K.J. “Bear” Gleason	13,128	36.22	+36.22
4	Republican	Betty Brown	Reelected	Libertarian	Rick E. Carter	1,567	4.32	+4.32
5	Republican	Bryan Hughes	Reelected	Republican	Bryan Hughes	26,286	81.93	+19.96
5	Republican	Bryan Hughes	Reelected	Libertarian	Tim Carmichael	5,795	18.06	+18.06
6	Republican	Leo Berman	Reelected	Republican	Leo Berman	25,496	100.00	
7	Republican	Tommy Merritt	Reelected	Republican	Tommy Merritt	20,810	68.43	−31.57
7	Republican	Tommy Merritt	Reelected	Democratic	Patrick Franklin	8,701	28.61	+28.61
7	Republican	Tommy Merritt	Reelected	Libertarian	Jonathan A. Rasco	897	2.94	+2.94
8	Republican	Byron Cook	Reelected	Republican	Byron Cook	17,767	57.86	−42.14
8	Republican	Byron Cook	Reelected	Democratic	Sharon Cade Davis	12,938	42.13	+42.13
9	Republican	Roy Blake Jr.	Lost in Republican Primary	Republican	Wayne Christian	20,838	100.00	+43.11
10	Republican	Jim Pitts	Reelected	Republican	Jim Pitts	25,196	66.81	−5.98
10	Republican	Jim Pitts	Reelected	Democratic	Kerry L. Horn	12,516	33.18	+5.98
11	Democratic	Chuck Hopson	Reelected	Republican	Larry K. Durrett	15,918	46.11	−1.18
11	Democratic	Chuck Hopson	Reelected	Democratic	Chuck Hopson	17,603	50.99	−1.71
11	Democratic	Chuck Hopson	Reelected	Libertarian	Paul “Blue” Story	998	2.89	+2.89
12	Democratic	Jim McReynolds	Reelected	Republican	Jody Anderson	15,707	42.07	−6.88
12	Democratic	Jim McReynolds	Reelected	Democratic	Jim McReynolds	20,747	55.58	+4.54
12	Democratic	Jim McReynolds	Reelected	Libertarian	Donald B. Keith	873	2.33	+2.33
13	Republican	Lois W. Kolkhorst	Reelected	Republican	Lois W. Kolkhorst	24,170	82.84	−17.16
13	Republican	Lois W. Kolkhorst	Reelected	Libertarian	Charles Stigall	5,006	17.15	+17.15
14	Republican	Fred Brown	Reelected	Republican	Fred Brown	22,056	100.00	
15	Republican	Rob Eissler	Reelected	Republican	Rob Eissler	30,880	73.33	−17.42
15	Republican	Rob Eissler	Reelected	Democratic	Sammie Miller	9,597	22.79	+22.79
15	Republican	Rob Eissler	Reelected	Libertarian	Brian J. Drake	1,633	3.87	−5.37
16	Republican	Ruben Hope Jr.	Did not run	Republican	Brandon Creighton	23,945	75.04	−24.96
16	Republican	Ruben Hope Jr.	Did not run	Democratic	Pat Poland	7,963	24.95	+24.95
17	Democratic	Robby Cook	Reelected	Republican	Tim Kleinschmidt	19,225	47.88	+3.70
17	Democratic	Robby Cook	Reelected	Democratic	Robby Cook	19,640	48.91	−4.75
17	Democratic	Robby Cook	Reelected	Libertarian	Roderick “Rod” Gibbs	1,283	3.19	+1.04
18	Republican	John Otto	Reelected	Republican	John Otto	19,153	76.00	+21.43
18	Republican	John Otto	Reelected	Libertarian	Kris Overstreet	6,048	23.99	+23.99
19	Republican	Mike Hamilton	Reelected	Republican	Mike Hamilton	16,082	57.35	+1.92
19	Republican	Mike Hamilton	Reelected	Democratic	Paul Clayton	11,957	42.64	−1.92
20	Republican	Dan M. Gattis	Reelected	Republican	Dan M. Gattis	31,158	63.37	−5.41
20	Republican	Dan M. Gattis	Reelected	Democratic	Jim Stauber	18,006	36.62	+5.41
21	Democratic	Allan Ritter	Reelected	Democratic	Allan Ritter	20,811	100.00	
22	Democratic	Joe Deshotel	Reelected	Democratic	Joe Deshotel	14,516	90.75	−2.98
22	Democratic	Joe Deshotel	Reelected	Libertarian	Judith Cobbett	1,479	9.24	+2.98
23	Democratic	Craig Eiland	Reelected	Democratic	Craig Eiland	22,618	83.79	−16.21
23	Democratic	Craig Eiland	Reelected	Libertarian	Raymond Lloyd	4,374	16.20	+16.20
24	Republican	Larry Taylor	Reelected	Republican	Larry Taylor	24,992	77.69	−22.31
24	Republican	Larry Taylor	Reelected	Libertarian	Brady Lee Hutchison	7,176	22.30	+22.30
25	Republican	Dennis Bonnen	Reelected	Republican	Dennis Bonnen	21,867	100.00	+33.99

== House race summary, Districts 26–50 ==
'District 33'

Incumbent Vilma Luna was unopposed in Democratic primary and was to be unopposed in the fall, but she withdrew from the race, allowing the Democratic Party a new nomination process and giving the Republican Party the chance to make its own nomination.

'District 48'

Ben Bentzin, unopposed in the Republican primary, withdrew from the race for House District 48 on August 21, 2006. Under the Texas Election Code, when a party nominee withdraws from a contested race, the party does not have the option to replace the candidate unless the candidate has been declared ineligible.

District	Party	Incumbent	Status	Party	Candidate	Votes	%	Change from 2004
26	Republican	Charles F. “Charlie” Howard	Reelected	Republican	Charles F. “Charlie” Howard	26,374	100.00	
27	Democratic	Dora Olivo	Reelected	Republican	Ken Bryant	13,475	39.20	+39.20
27	Democratic	Dora Olivo	Reelected	Democratic	Dora Olivo	20,898	60.79	−39.21
28	Republican	Glenn Hegar	Elected to Texas Senate, District 18	Republican	John Zerwas	25,094	62.96	−1.17
28	Republican	Glenn Hegar	Elected to Texas Senate, District 18	Democratic	Dorothy Bottos	14,760	37.03	+1.17
29	Republican	Glenda Dawson	Reelected. Dawson died September 12, 2006, but remained on the ballot due to election law.	Republican	Glenda Dawson	21,221	60.40	−39.60
29	Republican	Glenda Dawson	Reelected. Dawson died September 12, 2006, but remained on the ballot due to election law.	Democratic	Anthony A. Dinovo	13,908	39.59	+39.59
30	Republican	Geanie Morrison	Reelected	Republican	Geanie Morrison	24,725	100.00	+12.60
31	Democratic	Ryan Guillen	Reelected	Democratic	Ryan Guillen	12,711	100.00	
32	Republican	Gene Seaman	Defeated	Republican	Gene Seaman	16,840	46.15	−53.85
32	Republican	Gene Seaman	Defeated	Democratic	Juan M. Garcia	17,607	48.25	+48.25
32	Republican	Gene Seaman	Defeated	Libertarian	Lenard L. Nelson	2,038	5.58	+5.58
33	Democratic	Vilma Luna	Withdrew from race after primary	Republican	Joe McComb	13,023	47.91	+47.91
33	Democratic	Vilma Luna	Withdrew from race after primary	Democratic	Solomon Ortiz Jr.	14,154	52.08	−47.92
34	Democratic	Abel Herrero	Reelected	Democratic	Abel Herrero	17,561	78.41	+23.37
34	Democratic	Abel Herrero	Reelected	Libertarian	Bradley Moore	4,835	21.58	+21.58
35	Democratic	Yvonne Gonzalez Toureilles	Reelected	Republican	Michael Esparza	12,780	41.97	−7.09
35	Democratic	Yvonne Gonzalez Toureilles	Reelected	Democratic	Yvonne Gonzalez Toureilles	16,042	52.69	+1.76
35	Democratic	Yvonne Gonzalez Toureilles	Reelected	Libertarian	Edward Elmer	1,623	5.33	+5.33
36	Democratic	Ismael “Kino” Flores	Reelected	Democratic	Ismael “Kino” Flores	8,776	100.00	
37	Democratic	Rene O. Oliveira	Reelected	Democratic	Rene O. Oliveira	10,113	100.00	
38	Democratic	Jim Solis	Did not run	Republican	Luis Cavazos	5,054	28.50	+28.50
38	Democratic	Jim Solis	Did not run	Democratic	Eddie Lucio III	11,335	63.93	−36.07
38	Democratic	Jim Solis	Did not run	Libertarian	Linda E. McNally	1,339	7.55	+7.55
39	Democratic	Armando “Mando” Martinez	Reelected	Democratic	Armando “Mando” Martinez	8,122	100.00	
40	Democratic	Aaron Pena	Reelected	Democratic	Aaron Pena	7,073	100.00	
41	Democratic	Veronica Gonzales	Reelected	Democratic	Veronica Gonzales	9,794	100.00	
42	Democratic	Richard Raymond	Reelected	Democratic	Richard Raymond	12,787	100.00	
43	Democratic	Juan Manuel Escobar	Reelected	Democratic	Juan Manuel Escobar	12,164	100.00	+40.70
44	Republican	Edmund Kuempel	Reelected	Republican	Edmund Kuempel	28,931	100.00	
45	Democratic	Patrick M. Rose	Reelected	Republican	Jim Neuhaus	14,949	35.83	−9.60
45	Democratic	Patrick M. Rose	Reelected	Democratic	Patrick Rose	25,080	60.12	+5.56
45	Democratic	Patrick M. Rose	Reelected	Libertarian	Tom Gleinser	1,686	4.04	+4.04
46	Democratic	Dawnna Dukes	Reelected	Democratic	Dawnna Dukes	17,343	85.33	−14.67
46	Democratic	Dawnna Dukes	Reelected	Libertarian	Richard Wedeikes	2,980	14.66	+14.66
47	Republican	Terry Keel	Unsuccessful bid for Texas Court of Criminal Appeals, Place 8	Republican	Bill Welch	24,447	45.53	−54.47
47	Republican	Terry Keel	Unsuccessful bid for Texas Court of Criminal Appeals, Place 8	Democratic	Valinda Bolton	26,975	50.24	+50.24
47	Republican	Terry Keel	Unsuccessful bid for Texas Court of Criminal Appeals, Place 8	Libertarian	Yvonne Schick	2,265	4.21	+4.21
48	Democratic	Donna Howard	Reelected	Democratic	Donna Howard	31,255	77.76	+27.87
48	Democratic	Donna Howard	Reelected	Libertarian	Ben Easton	8,939	22.23	+22.23
49	Democratic	Elliott Naishtat	Reelected	Democratic	Elliott Naishtat	32,381	84.12	−1.73
49	Democratic	Elliott Naishtat	Reelected	Libertarian	Lisa McKay	6,111	15.87	+1.73
50	Democratic	Mark Strama	Reelected	Republican	Jeff Fleece	13,681	33.63	−14.08
50	Democratic	Mark Strama	Reelected	Democratic	Mark Strama	25,098	61.70	+13.11
50	Democratic	Mark Strama	Reelected	Libertarian	Jerry Chandler	1,892	4.65	+0.96

== House race summary, Districts 51–75 ==
District	Party	Incumbent	Status	Party	Candidate	Votes	%	Change from 2004
51	Democratic	Eddie Rodriguez	Reelected	Democratic	Eddie Rodriguez	13,521	85.72	−14.28
51	Democratic	Eddie Rodriguez	Reelected	Libertarian	Arthur DiBianca	2,252	14.27	+14.27
52	Republican	Mike Krusee	Reelected	Republican	Mike Krusee	18,853	50.44	−43.18
52	Republican	Mike Krusee	Reelected	Democratic	Karen Felthauser	16,520	44.20	+44.20
52	Republican	Mike Krusee	Reelected	Libertarian	Lillian Simmons	1,998	5.34	+5.34
53	Republican	Harvey Hilderbran	Reelected	Republican	Harvey Hilderbran	30,966	85.31	−14.69
53	Republican	Harvey Hilderbran	Reelected	Libertarian	B. W. Holk	5,328	14.68	+14.68
54	Republican	Suzanna Gratia Hupp	Did not run	Republican	Jimmie Don Aycock	16,314	60.44	−0.41
54	Republican	Suzanna Gratia Hupp	Did not run	Democratic	Edward Lindsay	9,802	36.31	−2.83
54	Republican	Suzanna Gratia Hupp	Did not run	Libertarian	Nicolaas Kramer	873	3.23	+3.23
55	Republican	Dianne White Delisi	Reelected	Republican	Dianne White Delisi	17,428	66.35	−33.65
55	Republican	Dianne White Delisi	Reelected	Democratic	Bill Smith	8,837	33.64	+33.64
56	Republican	Charles “Doc” Anderson	Reelected	Republican	Charles “Doc” Anderson	27,961	78.72	+25.51
56	Republican	Charles “Doc” Anderson	Reelected	Libertarian	Tom Kilbride	7,556	21.27	+21.27
57	Democratic	Jim Dunnam	Reelected	Democratic	Jim Dunnam	19,274	86.15	+27.82
57	Democratic	Jim Dunnam	Reelected	Libertarian	Neill Snider	3,097	13.84	+13.84
58	Republican	Rob Orr	Reelected	Republican	Rob Orr	21,766	62.75	−7.03
58	Republican	Rob Orr	Reelected	Democratic	Greg A. Kauffman	11,419	32.92	+2.71
58	Republican	Rob Orr	Reelected	Libertarian	Tom Stewart	1,497	4.31	+4.31
59	Republican	Sid Miller	Reelected	Republican	Sid Miller	15,235	55.53	−8.37
59	Republican	Sid Miller	Reelected	Democratic	Ernie Casbeer	12,198	44.46	+8.37
60	Republican	James L. “Jim” Keffer	Reelected	Republican	James L. “Jim” Keffer	24,223	67.18	−2.70
60	Republican	James L. “Jim” Keffer	Reelected	Democratic	Robert McKelvain	10,645	29.52	−0.59
60	Republican	James L. “Jim” Keffer	Reelected	Libertarian	Al Barrera	1,185	3.28	+3.28
61	Republican	Phil King	Reelected	Republican	Phil King	27,470	80.40	−19.60
61	Republican	Phil King	Reelected	Libertarian	Richard Forsythe Jr.	6,696	19.59	+19.59
62	Republican	Larry Phillips	Reelected	Republican	Larry Phillips	20,031	61.15	−38.85
62	Republican	Larry Phillips	Reelected	Democratic	Peter “Pete” Veeck	12,725	38.84	+38.84
63	Republican	Mary Denney	Did not run	Republican	Tan Parker	31,958	100.00	
64	Republican	Myra Crownover	Reelected	Republican	Myra Crownover	19,266	59.91	−40.09
64	Republican	Myra Crownover	Reelected	Democratic	John McLeod	12,888	40.08	+40.08
65	Republican	Burt Solomons	Reelected	Republican	Burt Solomons	20,687	78.38	−8.05
65	Republican	Burt Solomons	Reelected	Libertarian	John E. Shuey	5,704	21.61	+8.05
66	Republican	Brian McCall	Reelected	Republican	Brian McCall	24,399	80.33	−19.67
66	Republican	Brian McCall	Reelected	Libertarian	Benjamin Westfried	5,972	19.66	+19.66
67	Republican	Jerry Madden	Reelected	Republican	Jerry Madden	18,211	100.00	
68	Republican	Richard L. “Rick” Hardcastle	Reelected	Republican	Rick Hardcastle	26,949	100.00	
69	Democratic	David Farabee	Reelected	Republican	Shirley Craft	11,966	39.62	−7.28
69	Democratic	David Farabee	Reelected	Democratic	David Farabee	17,571	58.18	+5.09
69	Democratic	David Farabee	Reelected	Libertarian	Richard Brown	659	2.18	+2.18
70	Republican	Ken Paxton	Reelected	Republican	Ken Paxton	30,062	69.03	−6.99
70	Republican	Ken Paxton	Reelected	Democratic	Rick Koster	12,265	28.16	+4.19
70	Republican	Ken Paxton	Reelected	Libertarian	Robert R. Virasin	1,222	2.80	+2.80
71	Republican	Bob Hunter	Did not run	Republican	Susan King	18,026	57.66	−32.10
71	Republican	Bob Hunter	Did not run	Democratic	Mel Hailey	12,547	40.13	+40.13
71	Republican	Bob Hunter	Did not run	Libertarian	Vanessa Harris	687	2.19	−8.04
72	Republican	Scott Campbell	Defeated in Republican Primary	Republican	Drew Darby	19,334	81.45	+24.24
72	Republican	Scott Campbell	Defeated in Republican Primary	Libertarian	Dennis Higgins	4,401	18.54	+18.54
73	Republican	Carter Casteel	Defeated in Republican Primary	Republican	Nathan Macias	35,785	75.15	−24.85
73	Republican	Carter Casteel	Defeated in Republican Primary	Libertarian	Charles B. Ellis	9,142	19.19	+19.19
73	Republican	Carter Casteel	Defeated in Republican Primary	Write-In	Daniel C. Boone	2,690	5.64	+5.64
74	Democratic	Pete P. Gallego	Reelected	Democratic	Pete P. Gallego	19,324	100.00	
75	Democratic	Chente Quintanilla	Reelected	Republican	Paul B. Johnson Jr.	5,435	34.29	+34.29
75	Democratic	Chente Quintanilla	Reelected	Democratic	Chente Quintanilla	10,413	65.70	−34.30

== House race summary, Districts 76–100 ==
District	Party	Incumbent	Status	Party	Candidate	Votes	%	Change from 2004
76	Democratic	Norma Chavez	Reelected	Democratic	Norma Chavez	12,886	100.00	
77	Democratic	Paul C. Moreno	Reelected	Democratic	Paul C. Moreno	11,375	100.00	
78	Republican	Patrick B. Haggerty	Reelected	Republican	Patrick B. Haggerty	18,837	100.00	
79	Democratic	Joe C. Pickett	Reelected	Democratic	Joe C. Pickett	12,623	100.00	+33.41
80	Democratic	Tracy O. King	Reelected	Democratic	Tracy O. King	15,466	100.00	
81	Republican	George E. "Buddy" West	Reelected	Republican	George E. "Buddy" West	16,187	84.77	+9.68
81	Republican	George E. "Buddy" West	Reelected	Libertarian	Billy Grimes	2,907	15.22	+15.22
82	Republican	Tom Craddick	Reelected	Republican	Tom Craddick	24,187	100.00	
83	Republican	Delwin Jones	Reelected	Republican	Delwin Jones	27,887	73.29	−5.37
83	Republican	Delwin Jones	Reelected	Democratic	John E. Miller	10,161	26.70	+5.37
84	Republican	Carl H. Isett	Reelected	Republican	Carl H. Isett	15,751	66.12	−1.98
84	Republican	Carl H. Isett	Reelected	Democratic	Pearlie Mayfield	8,068	33.87	+1.98
85	Democratic	Pete Laney	Did not run	Republican	Jim Landtroop	14,106	48.27	+7.04
85	Democratic	Pete Laney	Did not run	Democratic	Joseph P. Heflin	14,323	49.01	−9.75
85	Democratic	Pete Laney	Did not run	Libertarian	David K. Schumacher	793	2.71	+2.71
86	Republican	John T. Smithee	Reelected	Republican	John T. Smithee	28,951	86.46	−13.54
86	Republican	John T. Smithee	Reelected	Libertarian	Bill Glover	4,532	13.53	+13.53
87	Republican	David Swinford	Reelected	Republican	David Swinford	16,993	100.00	
88	Republican	Warren Chisum	Reelected	Republican	Warren Chisum	24,044	84.99	−15.01
88	Republican	Warren Chisum	Reelected	Libertarian	Timothy Justice	4,244	15.00	+15.00
89	Republican	Jodie Anne Laubenberg	Reelected	Republican	Jodie Anne Laubenberg	30,841	69.87	−6.58
89	Republican	Jodie Anne Laubenberg	Reelected	Democratic	Lehman Harris	11,522	26.10	+2.56
89	Republican	Jodie Anne Laubenberg	Reelected	Libertarian	Helen Rhine	1,773	4.01	+4.01
90	Democratic	Lon Burnam	Reelected	Democratic	Lon Burnam	9,650	86.43	+21.21
90	Democratic	Lon Burnam	Reelected	Libertarian	Rod Wingo	1,515	13.56	+13.56
91	Republican	Bob E. Griggs	Did not run	Republican	Kelly Hancock	17,770	59.07	−40.93
91	Republican	Bob E. Griggs	Did not run	Democratic	Byron Sibbet	11,361	37.76	+37.76
91	Republican	Bob E. Griggs	Did not run	Libertarian	Garland Franklin	950	3.15	+3.15
92	Republican	Todd Smith	Reelected	Republican	Todd Smith	22,491	100.00	
93	Republican	Toby Goodman	Defeated	Republican	Toby Goodman	10,349	46.94	−9.11
93	Republican	Toby Goodman	Defeated	Democratic	Paula Hightower Pierson	10,936	49.60	+5.66
93	Republican	Toby Goodman	Defeated	Libertarian	Max W. Koch III	759	3.44	+3.44
94	Republican	Kent Grusendorf	Defeated in Republican Primary	Republican	Diane Patrick	21,800	63.53	+0.42
94	Republican	Kent Grusendorf	Defeated in Republican Primary	Democratic	David Pillow	11,147	32.48	−4.40
94	Republican	Kent Grusendorf	Defeated in Republican Primary	Libertarian	Leslie Herman	1,363	3.97	+3.97
95	Democratic	Marc Veasey	Reelected	Democratic	Marc Veasey	18,259	90.53	−9.47
95	Democratic	Marc Veasey	Reelected	Libertarian	John Paul Robinson	1,909	9.46	+9.46
96	Republican	Bill Zedler	Reelected	Republican	Bill Zedler	19,520	52.46	−7.87
96	Republican	Bill Zedler	Reelected	Democratic	Christopher Youngblood	16,483	44.29	+4.63
96	Republican	Bill Zedler	Reelected	Libertarian	Samuel S. Thomas	1,206	3.24	+3.24
97	Republican	Anna Mowery	Reelected	Republican	Anna Mowery	23,164	55.93	−7.31
97	Republican	Anna Mowery	Reelected	Democratic	Dan Barrett	16,908	40.82	+4.07
97	Republican	Anna Mowery	Reelected	Libertarian	Carlos M. Garcia	1,344	3.24	+3.24
98	Republican	Vicki Truitt	Reelected	Republican	Vicki Truitt	36,509	83.59	−16.41
98	Republican	Vicki Truitt	Reelected	Libertarian	Jacob Gregory Glatz	7,165	16.40	+16.40
99	Republican	Charlie Geren	Reelected	Republican	Charlie Geren	22,906	63.07	−6.60
99	Republican	Charlie Geren	Reelected	Democratic	Sheila Ford	12,285	33.82	+3.50
99	Republican	Charlie Geren	Reelected	Libertarian	John C. Waldowski	1,125	3.09	+3.09
100	Democratic	Terri Hodge	Reelected	Democratic	Terri Hodge	12,523	88.80	−11.20
100	Democratic	Terri Hodge	Reelected	Libertarian	Robert M. Pritchett	1,578	11.19	+11.19

== House race summary, Districts 101–125 ==
District	Party	Incumbent	Status	Party	Candidate	Votes	%	Change from 2004
101	Republican	Elvira Reyna	Lost in Republican Primary	Republican	Thomas Latham	13,248	76.22	−23.78
101	Republican	Elvira Reyna	Lost in Republican Primary	Libertarian	Jeffrey S. Joyner	4,132	23.77	+23.77
102	Republican	Tony Goolsby	Reelected	Republican	Tony Goolsby	13,166	51.93	−1.26
102	Republican	Tony Goolsby	Reelected	Democratic	Harriet Miller	11,613	45.81	−0.99
102	Republican	Tony Goolsby	Reelected	Libertarian	Thomas Hall	571	2.25	+2.25
103	Democratic	Rafael Anchia	Reelected	Democratic	Rafael Anchia	7,702	83.40	−16.60
103	Democratic	Rafael Anchia	Reelected	Libertarian	David R. Mason	1,533	16.59	+16.59
104	Democratic	Roberto R. Alonzo	Reelected	Democratic	Roberto R. Alonzo	7,906	85.47	−14.53
104	Democratic	Roberto R. Alonzo	Reelected	Libertarian	Cameron McSpadden	1,344	14.52	+14.52
105	Republican	Linda Harper-Brown	Reelected	Republican	Linda Harper-Brown	11,881	55.08	−4.12
105	Republican	Linda Harper-Brown	Reelected	Democratic	Bob Romano	8,865	41.10	+0.31
105	Republican	Linda Harper-Brown	Reelected	Libertarian	John Turner	822	3.81	+3.81
106	Republican	Kirk England	Reelected	Republican	Kirk England	10,459	49.16	−3.41
106	Republican	Kirk England	Reelected	Democratic	Katy Hubener	10,224	48.05	+0.63
106	Republican	Kirk England	Reelected	Libertarian	Gene Freeman	591	2.77	+2.77
107	Republican	Bill Keffer	Defeated	Republican	Bill Keffer	15,145	46.69	−53.31
107	Republican	Bill Keffer	Defeated	Democratic	Allen Vaught	16,254	50.10	+50.10
107	Republican	Bill Keffer	Defeated	Libertarian	Chris Jones	1,038	3.20	+3.20
108	Republican	Dan Branch	Reelected	Republican	Dan Branch	17,244	55.99	−6.51
108	Republican	Dan Branch	Reelected	Democratic	Jack F. Borden	12,447	40.41	+2.92
108	Republican	Dan Branch	Reelected	Libertarian	T. Evan Fisher	1,106	3.59	+3.59
109	Democratic	Helen Giddings	Reelected	Democratic	Helen Giddings	26,511	90.41	−9.59
109	Democratic	Helen Giddings	Reelected	Libertarian	Maurice Dubois	2,811	9.58	+9.58
110	Democratic	Jesse W. Jones	Lost in Democratic Primary	Democratic	Barbara Mallory Caraway	14,896	100.00	
111	Democratic	Yvonne Davis	Reelected	Republican	Cindy Werner	7,641	26.25	+26.25
111	Democratic	Yvonne Davis	Reelected	Democratic	Yvonne Davis	21,462	73.74	−26.26
112	Republican	Fred Hill	Reelected	Republican	Fred Hill	21,068	77.94	+12.18
112	Republican	Fred Hill	Reelected	Libertarian	Matthew G. Moseley	5,961	22.05	+22.05
113	Republican	Joe Driver	Reelected	Republican	Joe Driver	15,242	58.99	−6.12
113	Republican	Joe Driver	Reelected	Democratic	Eric Brandler	9,793	37.90	+3.02
113	Republican	Joe Driver	Reelected	Libertarian	Justin Winn	799	3.09	+3.09
114	Republican	Will Hartnett	Reelected	Republican	Will Ford Hartnett	16,808	55.58	−44.42
114	Republican	Will Hartnett	Reelected	Democratic	Phillip Shinoda	12,791	42.30	+42.30
114	Republican	Will Hartnett	Reelected	Libertarian	Edward C. Cormack	639	2.11	+2.11
115	Republican	Jim Jackson	Reelected	Republican	Jim Jackson	22,050	100.00	
116	Democratic	Trey Martinez Fischer	Reelected	Democratic	Trey Martinez Fischer	14,276	85.29	+21.08
116	Democratic	Trey Martinez Fischer	Reelected	Libertarian	John T. Tennison	2,461	14.70	+14.70
117	Democratic	David McQuade Leibowitz	Reelected	Republican	Ted Kenyon	8,820	40.37	−8.99
117	Democratic	David McQuade Leibowitz	Reelected	Democratic	David McQuade Leibowitz	13,024	59.62	+8.99
118	Democratic	Carlos “Charlie” Uresti	Elected to Texas Senate, District 19	Republican	George Antuna	10,082	44.28	+1.07
118	Democratic	Carlos “Charlie” Uresti	Elected to Texas Senate, District 19	Democratic	Joe Farias	10,982	48.24	−8.54
118	Democratic	Carlos “Charlie” Uresti	Elected to Texas Senate, District 19	Libertarian	James L. Thompson	1,701	7.47	+7.47
119	Democratic	Robert R. Puente	Reelected	Democratic	Robert R. Puente	14,818	100.00	+37.63
120	Democratic	Ruth Jones McClendon	Reelected	Democratic	Ruth Jones McClendon	14,563	85.83	−14.17
120	Democratic	Ruth Jones McClendon	Reelected	Libertarian	Jo Ann Thabet	2,404	14.16	+14.16
121	Republican	Joe Straus	Reelected	Republican	Joe Straus	26,836	77.44	−22.56
121	Republican	Joe Straus	Reelected	Libertarian	Barry L. Allison	7,816	22.55	+22.55
122	Republican	Frank Corte Jr.	Reelected	Republican	Frank Corte Jr.	37,625	66.47	−33.53
122	Republican	Frank Corte Jr.	Reelected	Democratic	Larry Dean Stallings	16,651	29.41	+29.41
122	Republican	Frank Corte Jr.	Reelected	Libertarian	Sally Baynton	2,325	4.10	+4.10
123	Democratic	Mike Villarreal	Reelected	Democratic	Mike Villarreal	14,659	84.60	+23.00
123	Democratic	Mike Villarreal	Reelected	Libertarian	Daniel P. Ragsdale	2,668	15.39	+15.39
124	Democratic	Jose Menendez	Reelected	Republican	Richard W. King	7,546	35.53	+35.53
124	Democratic	Jose Menendez	Reelected	Democratic	Jose Menendez	13,687	64.46	−35.54
125	Democratic	Joaquin Castro	Reelected	Republican	Nelson Balido	9,516	37.96	+37.96
125	Democratic	Joaquin Castro	Reelected	Democratic	Joaquin Castro	14,466	57.71	−42.29
125	Democratic	Joaquin Castro	Reelected	Libertarian	Jeffrey C. Blunt	1,082	4.31	+4.31

== House race summary, Districts 126–150 ==
District	Party	Incumbent	Status	Party	Candidate	Votes	%	Change from 2004
126	Republican	Peggy Hamric	Unsuccessful bid for Texas Senate, District 7	Republican	Patricia Harless	18,112	64.77	−4.50
126	Republican	Peggy Hamric	Unsuccessful bid for Texas Senate, District 7	Democratic	Chad Khan	9,114	32.59	+1.87
126	Republican	Peggy Hamric	Unsuccessful bid for Texas Senate, District 7	Libertarian	Oscar J. Palma Jr.	736	2.63	+2.63
127	Republican	Joe Crabb	Reelected	Republican	Joe Crabb	20,773	57.87	−12.57
127	Republican	Joe Crabb	Reelected	Democratic	Diane Trautman	14,305	39.85	+10.30
127	Republican	Joe Crabb	Reelected	Libertarian	Veal Johnson	814	2.26	+2.26
128	Republican	Wayne Smith	Reelected	Republican	Wayne Smith	15,327	100.00	+34.68
129	Republican	John E. Davis	Reelected	Republican	John E. Davis	19,616	57.67	−42.33
129	Republican	John E. Davis	Reelected	Democratic	Sherrie L. Matula	14,397	42.32	+42.32
130	Republican	Corbin Van Arsdale	Reelected	Republican	Corbin Van Arsdale	29,860	83.40	−9.01
130	Republican	Corbin Van Arsdale	Reelected	Libertarian	William B. Gray Jr.	5,941	16.59	+9.01
131	Democratic	Alma A. Allen	Reelected	Democratic	Alma A. Allen	14,379	94.58	−5.42
131	Democratic	Alma A. Allen	Reelected	Libertarian	C. S. Fuller	823	5.41	+5.41
132	Republican	Bill Callegari	Reelected	Republican	Bill Callegari	21,221	82.41	−17.59
132	Republican	Bill Callegari	Reelected	Libertarian	Cesar A. De La Canal	4,527	17.58	+17.58
133	Republican	Joe Nixon	Unsuccessful bid for Texas Senate, District 7	Republican	Jim Murphy	11,693	55.77	−22.49
133	Republican	Joe Nixon	Unsuccessful bid for Texas Senate, District 7	Democratic	Kristi Thibaut	8,750	41.73	+41.73
133	Republican	Joe Nixon	Unsuccessful bid for Texas Senate, District 7	Libertarian	Chris Camero	522	2.48	+2.48
134	Republican	Martha Wong	Defeated	Republican	Martha Wong	20,005	43.26	−10.31
134	Republican	Martha Wong	Defeated	Democratic	Ellen Cohen	25,219	54.53	+10.20
134	Republican	Martha Wong	Defeated	Libertarian	Mhair S. Dekmezian	1,018	2.20	+0.11
135	Republican	Gary Elkins	Reelected	Republican	Gary Elkins	16,083	100.00	
136	Republican	Beverly Woolley	Reelected	Republican	Beverly Woolley	23,392	68.24	−22.08
136	Republican	Beverly Woolley	Reelected	Democratic	Scott R. Brann	9,976	29.10	+29.10
136	Republican	Beverly Woolley	Reelected	Libertarian	J. W. Stables	910	2.65	−7.02
137	Democratic	Scott Hochberg	Reelected	Republican	Sylvia Spivey	3,792	42.16	−1.22
137	Democratic	Scott Hochberg	Reelected	Democratic	Scott Hochberg	5,201	57.83	+1.22
138	Republican	Dwayne Bohac	Reelected	Republican	Dwayne Bohac	12,504	58.42	−5.33
138	Republican	Dwayne Bohac	Reelected	Democratic	Mark McDavid	8,286	38.71	+2.47
138	Republican	Dwayne Bohac	Reelected	Libertarian	Mike Craig	610	2.85	+2.85
139	Democratic	Sylvester Turner	Reelected	Democratic	Sylvester Turner	13,969	100.00	
140	Democratic	Kevin Bailey	Reelected	Democratic	Kevin Bailey	6,168	100.00	+32.56
141	Democratic	Senfronia Thompson	Reelected	Democratic	Senfronia Thompson	12,926	100.00	
142	Democratic	Harold V. Dutton Jr.	Reelected	Democratic	Harold V. Dutton Jr.	15,025	93.55	+13.41
142	Democratic	Harold V. Dutton Jr.	Reelected	Libertarian	Mary Czapla-Fullard	1,035	6.44	+6.44
143	Democratic	Ana E. Hernandez	Reelected	Republican	Dorothy Olmos	2,218	26.00	+26.00
143	Democratic	Ana E. Hernandez	Reelected	Democratic	Ana E. Hernandez	6,026	70.64	−22.19
143	Democratic	Ana E. Hernandez	Reelected	Libertarian	Joe O. Marcom	286	3.35	−3.81
144	Republican	Robert Talton	Reelected	Republican	Robert Talton	11,125	56.29	−43.71
144	Republican	Robert Talton	Reelected	Democratic	Janette Padilla Sexton	8,017	40.56	+40.56
144	Republican	Robert Talton	Reelected	Libertarian	Matthew Kolar	620	3.13	+3.13
145	Democratic	Richard J. “Rick” Noriega	Reelected	Democratic	Richard J. “Rick” Noriega	7,773	100.00	
146	Democratic	Al Edwards	Lost in Democratic Primary	Democratic	Borris L. Miles	19,812	90.54	−9.46
146	Democratic	Al Edwards	Lost in Democratic Primary	Libertarian	Gerald W. “Jerry” LaFleur	2,068	9.45	+9.45
147	Democratic	Garnet F. Coleman	Reelected	Democratic	Garnet F. Coleman	17,273	100.00	
148	Democratic	Jessica Cristina Farrar	Reelected	Democratic	Jessica Cristina Farrar	12,790	84.27	−15.73
148	Democratic	Jessica Cristina Farrar	Reelected	Libertarian	Ray E. Dittmar	2,387	15.72	+15.72
149	Democratic	Hubert Vo	Reelected	Republican	Talmadge L. Heflin	10,632	45.72	−4.24
149	Democratic	Hubert Vo	Reelected	Democratic	Hubert Vo	12,621	54.27	+4.24
150	Republican	Debbie Riddle	Reelected	Republican	Debbie Riddle	22,585	70.27	−29.73
150	Republican	Debbie Riddle	Reelected	Democratic	Dot Nelson-Turnier	9,554	29.72	+29.72
