= 78th Texas Legislature =

The 78th Texas Legislature met from January 14 to June 2, 2003 in regular session, and in three called sessions in 2003, and a fourth called session in 2004. All members of the House of Representatives and all members of the Senate (15 to two-year terms, 16 to four-year terms) were elected in the 2002 general election, with seats apportioned among the 2000 United States census.

This was the first legislature in over 100 years that Republicans had control of both Houses of the Legislature. Tom Craddick was elected as the first Republican Speaker of the House since 1873.

== Notable Events ==
=== Mid-Decade Redistricting and Quorum Break ===
During the 2003 Texas redistricting, the majority Republicans in the Texas House of Representatives sought to carry out a controversial mid-decade congressional redistricting bill which would have favored Republicans by displacing five Democratic U.S. Representatives from Texas, nicknamed the "Texas Five", from their districts. The House Democrats, certain of defeat if a quorum were present, took a plane to the neighboring state of Oklahoma to prevent a quorum from being present (and thus the passage of the bill). The group gained the nickname the "Killer Ds".

Similarly, the minority Democrats in the Texas Legislature's upper chamber, the Texas Senate, fled to New Mexico to prevent a quorum of the Senate to prevent a redistricting bill from being considered during a special session. The group, nicknamed the "Texas Eleven", stayed in New Mexico for 46 days before John Whitmire returned to Texas, creating a quorum. Because there was now no point in staying in New Mexico, the remaining ten members of the Texas Eleven returned to Texas to vote in opposition to the bill.

== Sessions ==
- 78th Regular session: January 14, 2003 – June 2, 2003
- 78th First called session: June 30, 2003 – July 28, 2003

To consider legislation relating to congressional redistricting.

- 78th Second called session: July 28, 2003 – August 26, 2003

To consider legislation relating to congressional redistricting.

- 78th Third called session: September 15, 2003 – October 12, 2003

To consider legislation relating to congressional redistricting.

To consider legislation relating to state fiscal management, including adjustments to certain school district fiscal matters made necessary by recent changes in state fiscal management; making related appropriations.

To consider legislation relating to the dates of certain elections, the procedures for canvassing the ballots for an election, and the counting of certain ballots voted by mail.

To consider legislation modifying the filing period and related election dates for the primary elections in Texas.

To consider legislation relating to the financing, construction, improvement, maintenance, and operation of toll facilities by the Texas Department of Transportation and the disposition of money generated by the driver responsibility program, fines imposed for certain traffic offenses, and certain fees collected by the Department of Public Safety of the State of Texas; making an appropriation.

To consider legislation relating to the reorganization of, efficiency in, and other reform measures applying to state government.

To consider legislation appropriating fees established by legislation from the 78th Regular Session of the Texas Legislature that remain unappropriated. This matter shall be strictly construed to only include fees that were established during that session of the legislature.

Legislation relating to making an appropriation for the purpose of returning to a fund outside of the state treasury cash that was transferred from the fund to the general revenue fund.

- 78th Fourth called session: April 20, 2004 – May 17, 2004

To consider legislation that provides for performance based incentives to schools that attain higher levels of achievement.

To consider legislation that provides a cap on the growth in the appraisal values of homesteads for property tax purposes.

To consider legislation that provides a cap that is indexed to population and inflation on all property tax revenues received by local governments.

To consider legislation that provides reform of the property tax appraisal process, including having elected officials approve certification rolls, and requiring mandatory sales price disclosure of real property.

To consider legislation that provides for modifications to the recapture provisions of the school finance system, including but not limited to a constitutional amendment that links residential and non-residential tax rates at a lower level than provided by current law, providing for local enrichment.

To consider legislation that creates an Educational Excellence Fund to provide incentive funding, funding to maintain and enhance equity, and greater funding to address the needs of students with limited English proficiency.

To consider legislation on education reforms and property tax reduction proposals that benefit the school children and property tax payers of Texas.

To consider legislation that provides for an increase in cigarette and tobacco product taxes and fees and dedicating the revenue derived from the increase to the Educational Excellence Fund and for school property tax relief for taxpayers.

To consider legislation and amendments to the constitution that authorize and allow the placement and licensing of video lottery terminals at licensed racetracks and certain Indian reservations, providing that the revenue derived from such activity is dedicated to the Educational Excellence Fund, providing that the racetracks and tribes sign a contract with the state.

To consider legislation that privatizes the collection of delinquent taxes.

To consider legislation that provides for a reasonable tax and fees on certain adult entertainment venues.

To consider legislation that provides for an acceleration in the collection of tax revenues.

To consider legislation that reduces fraud in the sale of automobiles.

To consider legislation that closes loopholes in the franchise tax and dedicates the revenue from closing the loopholes to the Educational Excellence Fund and for school property tax relief for taxpayers.

== Party summary ==
=== Senate ===
Affiliation	Members	Note
Republican Party	19	
Democratic Party	12	
Total	31	

=== House of Representatives ===
Affiliation	Members	Note
Republican Party	88	
Democratic Party	62	
Total	150	

== Officers ==
=== Senate ===
- Lieutenant Governor: David Dewhurst, Republican
- President Pro Tempore (regular session): Eddie Lucio, Jr., Democrat
- President Pro Tempore (1st–3rd called sessions): Jane Nelson, Republican
- President Pro Tempore (4th called session): Jeff Wentworth, Republican

=== House of Representatives ===
- Speaker of the House: Tom Craddick, Republican

== Members ==
Members of the Seventy-eighth Texas Legislature at the beginning of the regular session, January 14, 2003:

=== Senate ===
District	Senator	Party	Took office
1	Bill Ratliff	Republican	1989
2	Bob Deuell	Republican	2003
3	Todd Staples	Republican	2000
4	Tommy Williams	Republican	2003
5	Steve Ogden	Republican	1997
6	Mario Gallegos, Jr.	Democrat	1995
7	Jon Lindsay	Republican	1997
8	Florence Shapiro	Republican	1993
9	Chris Harris	Republican	1991
10	Kim Brimer	Republican	2003
11	Mike Jackson	Republican	1999
12	Jane Nelson	Republican	1993
13	Rodney Ellis	Democrat	1990
14	Gonzalo Barrientos	Democrat	1985
15	John Whitmire	Democrat	1983
16	John J. Carona	Republican	June 1996
17	Kyle Janek	Republican	November 2002
18	Kenneth L. Armbrister	Democrat	1987
19	Frank L. Madla	Democrat	1993
20	Chuy Hinojosa	Democrat	2003
21	Judith Zaffirini	Democrat	1987
22	Kip Averitt	Republican	April 2002
23	Royce West	Democrat	1993
24	Troy Fraser	Republican	1997
25	Jeff Wentworth	Republican	1993
26	Leticia R. Van de Putte	Democrat	1999
27	Eddie Lucio, Jr.	Democrat	1991
28	Robert L. Duncan	Republican	December 1996
29	Eliot Shapleigh	Democrat	1997
30	Craig Estes	Republican	December 2001
31	Teel Bivins	Republican	1989

=== House of Representatives ===
District	Representative	Party	Took office
1	Barry B. Telford	Democrat	1986
2	Dan Flynn	Republican	2003
3	Mark S. Homer	Democrat	1999
4	Betty Brown	Republican	1999
5	Bryan Hughes	Republican	2003
6	Leo Berman	Republican	1999
7	Tommy Merritt	Republican	1997
8	Byron Cook	Republican	2003
9	Wayne Christian	Republican	1996
10	Jim Pitts	Republican	1993
11	Chuck Hopson	Democrat	2001
12	Jim McReynolds	Democrat	1997
13	Lois Kolkhorst	Republican	2001
14	Fred Brown	Republican	1999
15	Rob Eissler	Republican	2003
16	Ruben Hope, Jr.	Republican	1999
17	Robby Cook	Democrat	1997
18	Dan Ellis	Democrat	1998
19	Tuffy Hamilton	Republican	2003
20	Dan Gattis	Republican	2003
21	Allan Ritter	Democrat	1999
22	Joe Deshotel	Democrat	1999
23	Craig Eiland	Democrat	1995
24	Larry Taylor	Republican	2003
25	Dennis Bonnen	Republican	1997
26	Charles F. "Charlie" Howard	Republican	1995
27	Dora Olivo	Democrat	1997
28	Glenn Hegar	Republican	2003
29	Glenda Dawson	Republican	2003
30	Geanie Morrison	Republican	1999
31	Ryan Guillen	Democrat	2003
32	Gene Seaman	Republican	1997
33	Vilma Luna	Democrat	1993
34	Jaime Capelo	Democrat	1998
35	Gabi Canales	Democrat	2003
36	Kino Flores	Democrat	1997
37	Rene O. Oliveira	Democrat	1991 (first time: 1981–1987)
38	Jim Solis	Democrat	1993
39	Miguel Wise	Democrat	1996
40	Aaron Pena	Democrat	2003
41	Roberto Gutierrez	Democrat	1992
42	Richard Raymond	Democrat	2001 (first time: 1993–1999)
43	Irma Rangel	Democrat	1976
44	Edmund Kuempel	Republican	1983
45	Patrick Rose	Democrat	2003
46	Dawnna Dukes	Democrat	1995
47	Terry Keel	Republican	1997
48	Todd Baxter	Republican	2003
49	Elliott Naishtat	Democrat	1991
50	Jack Stick	Republican	2003
51	Eddie Rodriguez	Democrat	2003
52	Mike Krusee	Republican	1993
53	Harvey Hilderbran	Republican	1989
54	Suzanna Gratia Hupp	Republican	1996
55	Dianne Delisi	Republican	1991
56	John Mabry	Democrat	2003
57	Jim Dunnam	Democrat	1997
58	Arlene Wohlgemuth	Republican	1994
59	Sid Miller	Republican	2001
60	Jim Keffer	Republican	1997
61	Phil King	Republican	1999
62	Larry Phillips	Republican	2003
63	Mary Denny	Republican	1993
64	Myra Crownover	Republican	2000
65	Burt Solomons	Republican	1995
66	Brian McCall	Republican	1991
67	Jerry Madden	Republican	1993
68	Rick Hardcastle	Republican	1999
69	David Farabee	Democrat	1999
70	Ken Paxton	Republican	2003
71	Robert Dean Hunter	Republican	1986
72	Scott Campbell	Republican	2003
73	Carter Casteel	Republican	2003
74	Pete P. Gallego	Democrat	1991
75	Chente Quintanilla	Democrat	2003
76	Norma Chavez	Democrat	1997
77	Paul C. Moreno	Democrat	1975 (first time: 1967–1973)
78	Pat Haggerty	Republican	1989
79	Joe C. Pickett	Democrat	1995
80	Timo Garza	Democrat	2003
81	Buddy West	Republican	1993
82	Tom Craddick	Republican	1969
83	Delwin Jones	Republican	1989 (first time: 1965–1981)
84	Carl H. Isett	Republican	1997
85	Pete Laney	Democrat	1973
86	John Smithee	Republican	1985
87	David Swinford	Republican	1991
88	Warren Chisum	Republican	1989
89	Jodie Anne Laubenberg	Republican	2003
90	Lon Burnam	Democrat	1997
91	Bob E. Griggs	Republican	2003
92	Todd Smith	Republican	1997
93	Toby Goodman	Republican	1991
94	Kent Grusendorf	Republican	1987
95	Glenn Lewis	Democrat	1994
96	Bill Zedler	Republican	2003
97	Anna Mowery	Republican	1988
98	Vicki Truitt	Republican	1999
99	Charlie Geren	Republican	2001
100	Terri Hodge	Democrat	1997
101	Elvira Reyna	Republican	1993
102	Tony Goolsby	Republican	1989
103	Steven D. Wolens	Democrat	1996
104	Roberto R. Alonzo	Democrat	2003 (first time: 1993–1997)
105	Linda Harper-Brown	Republican	2003
106	Ray Allen	Republican	1993
107	Bill Keffer	Republican	2002
108	Dan Branch	Republican	2003
109	Helen Giddings	Democrat	1993
110	Jesse W. Jones	Democrat	1993
111	Yvonne Davis	Democrat	1993
112	Fred Hill	Republican	1989
113	Joe Driver	Republican	1993
114	Will Ford Hartnett	Republican	1991
115	Kenny Marchant	Republican	1986
116	Trey Martinez Fischer	Democrat	2001
117	Ken Mercer	Republican	2003
118	Carlos Uresti	Democrat	1997
119	Robert R. Puente	Democrat	1991
120	Ruth McClendon	Democrat	1996
121	Elizabeth Ames Jones	Republican	2000
122	Frank Corte, Jr.	Republican	1993
123	Mike Villarreal	Democrat	2000
124	Jose Menendez	Democrat	2001
125	Joaquin Castro	Democrat	2003
126	Peggy Hamric	Republican	1991
127	Joe Crabb	Republican	1993
128	Wayne Smith	Republican	2003
129	John E. Davis	Republican	1999
130	Corbin Van Arsdale	Republican	2003
131	Ron Wilson	Democrat	1976
132	Bill Callegari	Republican	2001
133	Joe Nixon	Republican	1995
134	Martha Wong	Republican	2003
135	Gary Elkins	Republican	1995
136	Beverly Woolley	Republican	1995
137	Scott Hochberg	Democrat	1993
138	Dwayne Bohac	Republican	2003
139	Sylvester Turner	Democrat	1989
140	Kevin Bailey	Democrat	1991
141	Senfronia Thompson	Democrat	1973
142	Harold V. Dutton, Jr.	Democrat	1985
143	Joe E. Moreno	Democrat	1998
144	Robert Talton	Republican	1993
145	Rick Noriega	Democrat	1999
146	Al Edwards	Democrat	1979
147	Garnet Coleman	Democrat	1991
148	Jessica Farrar	Democrat	1995
149	Talmadge L. Heflin	Republican	1992
150	Debbie Riddle	Republican	2002

: In the 2002 General Election, Ron Clark won the District 62 seat but declined it, having received an appointment as a United States federal judge. Phillips was elected prior to the start of the regular session.

== Membership Changes ==
=== Senate ===
District	Outgoing Senator	Reason for Vacancy	Successor	Date of Successor's Installation
District 1	Bill Ratliff	Retirement. Senator Ratliff resigned effective January 10, 2004 for personal reasons.	Kevin Eltife	March 5, 2004
District 31	Teel Bivins	Resignation. Senator Bivins resigned effective January 12, 2004 after being appointed U.S. Ambassador to Sweden by President George W. Bush.	Kel Seliger	March 2, 2003

- District 1: A special election was held on January 20, 2004. No candidate received a majority of the votes on that date, so the top two candidates faced each other in a runoff on February 17, 2004. Kevin Eltife received a majority of the vote and was sworn in on March 5, 2004.
- District 31: A special election was held on January 20, 2004. No candidate received a majority of the votes on that date, so the top two candidates faced each other in a runoff on February 17, 2004. Kel Seliger received a majority of the vote and was sworn in on March 2, 2004.

=== House of Representatives ===
District	Outgoing Representative	Reason for Vacancy	Successor	Date of Successor's Installation
District 43	Irma Rangel	Representative Rangel died on March 18, 2003.	Juan Manuel Escobar	May 9, 2003
District 62	Ron Clark	Representative Clark declined his seat after accepting appointment as United States federal judge.	Larry Phillips	January 14, 2003

- District 43: A special election was held on April 15, 2003. No candidate received a majority of the votes on that date, so the top two candidates faced each other in a runoff on May 6, 2003. Juan Manuel Escobar won the runoff and was sworn in 3 days later, on May 9, 2003.
- District 62: Representative Clark was elected in the 2002 General Election, but resigned before re-taking the oath of office for the Seventy-eighth Legislature. A special election was held on December 14, 2002. No candidate received a majority of the votes on that date, so the top two candidates faced each other in a runoff on January 7, 2002. Larry Phillips won the runoff and was sworn in at the opening of the regular session.
