= 79th Texas Legislature =

The 79th Texas Legislature met from 11 January to 30 May 2005 in regular session, and in consecutive called sessions from 21 June to 20 July (First called session) and 21 July to 19 August 2005 (Second called session). It met again in 2006 from 17 April to 16 May. Most of the members of the House of Representatives and 15 members of the Senate were elected in the 2004 general election; the other House members were elected in special elections held in 2006.

== Sessions ==
- 79th Regular session: 11 January 2005 – 30 May 2005
- 79th First called session: 21 June 2005 – 20 July 2005

To consider legislation that addresses educator compensation, benefits and certification.

To consider legislation that provides for public school financial accountability and that increases transparency in school district financial reporting.

To consider legislation that provides for performance-based incentives to educators and schools that attain higher levels of student achievement.

To consider legislation that funds textbooks and that creates the instructional materials allotment for public schools.

To consider legislation that provides for charter school funding and reform.

To consider legislation that provides for modifications to the recapture provisions of the public school finance system.

To consider legislation that provides for November elections for public school boards of trustees.

To consider legislation providing funding for the public school finance system and the continuation of the Texas Education Agency.

To consider legislation providing for end-of-course examinations to be used in public schools.

To consider legislation that provides for increased accountability and intervention for schools failing to meet state standards.

To consider legislation that provides for local property tax rate compression and voter approval of local property tax rates.

To consider legislation that establishes indicators of college readiness and higher levels of student achievement in the public school accountability system.

Legislation relating to limiting the use of eminent domain to take private property for private parties or economic development purposes.

- 79th Second called session: 21 July 2005 – 19 August 2005

To consider legislation to limit the ad valorem tax appraisals and rates of certain taxing units.

To consider legislation that provides ad valorem tax relief and protects taxpayers.

To consider legislation to increase the homestead ad valorem tax exemption.

Legislation that addresses educator compensation, benefits, and certification.

Legislation that provides for public school financial accountability and that increases transparency in school district financial reporting.

Legislation that provides for performance-based incentives to educators and schools that attain higher levels of student achievement.

Legislation that funds textbooks and that creates the instructional materials allotment for public schools.

Legislation that provides for charter school funding and reform.

Legislation that provides for modifications to the recapture provisions of the public school finance system.

Legislation that provides for November elections for public school boards of trustees.

Legislation providing funding for the public school finance system and the continuation of the Texas Education Agency.

Legislation providing for end-of-course examinations to be used in public schools.

Legislation that provides for increased accountability and intervention for schools failing to meet state standards.

Legislation that provides for local property tax rate compression and voter approval of local property tax rates.

Legislation that establishes indicators of college readiness and higher levels of student achievement in the public school accountability system.

Legislation relating to the authorization, issuance, and funding of tuition revenue bonds.

Legislation relating to an increase in the compensation of judges, including salary and retirement benefits.

Legislation related to further competition in the telecommunications market.

Legislation related to the provision of broadband over powerlines.

Legislation related to the issuance of state-issued certificate of franchise authority for cable and video services.

- 79th Third called session: 17 April 2006

== Party summary ==
=== Senate ===
Affiliation	Members	Note
Republican Party	19	
Democratic Party	12	
'Total'	31	

=== House of Representatives ===
Affiliation	Members	Note
Republican Party	86	
Democratic Party	64	
'Total'	150	

== Officers ==
=== Senate ===
- Lieutenant Governor: David Dewhurst, Republican
- President Pro Tempore:

'Regular Session': Florence Shapiro, Republican
'Ad Interim' (30 May 2005-16 April 2006): Frank Madla, Democrat
'Ad Interim' (17 April 2006-8 January 2007): Royce West, Democrat

=== House of Representatives ===
- Speaker of the House: Tom Craddick, Republican

== Members ==
Members of the Seventy-ninth Texas Legislature at the beginning of the regular session, 11 January 2005:

=== Senate ===
Senator	Party	District	Home Town	Took office
Kevin Eltife	Republican	1	Tyler	2004
Bob Deuell	Republican	2	Greenville	2003
Todd Staples	Republican	3	Palestine	2000
Tommy Williams	Republican	4	The Woodlands	2003
Steve Ogden	Republican	5	Bryan	1997
Mario Gallegos, Jr.	Democratic	6	Houston	1995
Jon Lindsay	Republican	7	Houston	1997
Florence Shapiro	Republican	8	Plano	1993
Chris Harris	Republican	9	Arlington	1991
Kim Brimer	Republican	10	Fort Worth	2003
Mike Jackson	Republican	11	La Porte	1999
Jane Nelson	Republican	12	Lewisville	1993
Rodney Ellis	Democratic	13	Houston	1990
Gonzalo Barrientos	Democratic	14	Austin	1985
John Whitmire	Democratic	15	Houston	1983
John Carona	Republican	16	Dallas	1996
Kyle Janek	Republican	17	Houston	2002
Kenneth L. Armbrister	Democratic	18	Katy	1987
Frank L. Madla	Democratic	19	San Antonio	1993
Juan "Chuy" Hinojosa	Democratic	20	Mission	2002
Judith Zaffirini	Democratic	21	Laredo	1987
Kip Averitt	Republican	22	Waco	2002
Royce West	Democratic	23	Dallas	1993
Troy Fraser	Republican	24	Horseshoe Bay	1997
Jeff Wentworth	Republican	25	San Antonio	1993
Leticia R. Van de Putte	Democratic	26	San Antonio	1999
Eddie Lucio, Jr.	Democratic	27	Brownsville	1991
Robert L. Duncan	Republican	28	Lubbock	1997
Eliot Shapleigh	Democratic	29	El Paso	1997
Craig Estes	Republican	30	Wichita Falls	2001
Kel Seliger	Republican	31	Amarillo	2004

=== House of Representatives ===
District	Representative	Party	Took office
1	Stephen James Frost	Democrat	January 11, 2005
2	Dan Flynn	Republican	2003
3	Mark_S._Homer	Democrat	1999
4	Betty Brown	Republican	1999
5	Bryan Hughes	Republican	2003
6	Leo Berman	Republican	1999
7	Tommy Merritt	Republican	1997
8	Byron Cook	Republican	2003
9	Roy Blake, Jr.	Republican	2005
10	Jim Pitts	Republican	1993
11	Chuck Hopson	Democrat	2001
12	Jim McReynolds	Democrat	1997
13	Lois Kolkhorst	Republican	2001
14	Fred Brown	Republican	1999
15	Rob Eissler	Republican	2003
16	Ruben Hope, Jr.	Republican	1999
17	Robby Cook	Democrat	1997
18	John Otto	Democrat	2005
19	Tuffy Hamilton	Republican	2003
20	Dan Gattis	Republican	2003
21	Allan Ritter	Democrat	1999
22	Joe Deshotel	Democrat	1999
23	Craig Eiland	Democrat	1995
24	Larry Taylor	Republican	2003
25	Dennis Bonnen	Republican	1997
26	Charles F. "Charlie" Howard	Republican	1995
27	Dora Olivo	Democrat	1997
28	Glenn Hegar	Republican	2003
29	Glenda Dawson	Republican	2003
30	Geanie W. Morrison	Republican	1999
31	Ryan Guillen	Democrat	2003
32	Gene Seaman	Republican	1997
33	Vilma Luna	Democrat	1993
34	Abel Herrero	Democrat	2005
35	Yvonne Gonzalez Toureilles	Democrat	2005
36	Kino Flores	Democrat	1997
37	Rene O. Oliveira	Democrat	1991 (first time: 1981–1987)
38	Jim Solis	Democrat	1993
39	Mando Martinez	Democrat	2005
40	Aaron Pena	Democrat	2003
41	Veronica Gonzales	Democrat	2005
42	Richard Raymond	Democrat	2001 (first time: 1993–1999)
43	Juan Manuel Escobar	Democrat	2003
44	Edmund Kuempel	Republican	1983
45	Patrick Rose	Democrat	2003
46	Dawnna Dukes	Democrat	1995
47	Terry Keel	Republican	1997
48	Todd Baxter	Republican	2003
49	Elliott Naishtat	Democrat	1991
50	Mark Strama	Democrat	2005
51	Eddie Rodriguez	Democrat	2003
52	Mike Krusee	Republican	1993
53	Harvey Hilderbran	Republican	1989
54	Suzanna Gratia Hupp	Republican	1996
55	Dianne White Delisi	Republican	1991
56	Doc Anderson	Republican	2005
57	Jim Dunnam	Democrat	1997
58	Rob Orr	Republican	2005
59	Sid Miller	Republican	2001
60	Jim Keffer	Republican	1997
61	Phil King	Republican	1999
62	Larry Phillips	Republican	2003
63	Mary Denny	Republican	1993
64	Myra Crownover	Republican	2000
65	Burt Solomons	Republican	1995
66	Brian McCall	Republican	1991
67	Jerry Madden	Republican	1993
68	Rick Hardcastle	Republican	1999
69	David Farabee	Democrat	1999
70	Ken Paxton	Republican	2003
71	Bob Hunter	Republican	1986
72	Scott Campbell	Republican	2004
73	Carter Casteel	Republican	2003
74	Pete P. Gallego	Democrat	1991
75	Chente Quintanilla	Democrat	2003
76	Norma Chavez	Democrat	1997
77	Paul C. Moreno	Democrat	1975 (first time: 1967–1973)
78	Pat Haggerty	Republican	1989
79	Joe C. Pickett	Democrat	1995
80	Tracy O. King	Democrat	2005
81	Buddy West	Republican	1993
82	Tom Craddick	Republican	1969
83	Delwin Jones	Republican	1989 (first time: 1965–1981)
84	Carl H. Isett	Republican	1997
85	Pete Laney	Democrat	1973
86	John T. Smithee	Republican	1985
87	David Swinford	Republican	1991
88	Warren Chisum	Republican	1989
89	Jodie Laubenberg	Republican	2003
90	Lon Burnam	Democrat	1997
91	Bob E. Griggs	Republican	2003
92	Todd Smith	Republican	1997
93	Toby Goodman	Republican	1991
94	Kent Grusendorf	Republican	1987
95	Marc Veasey	Democrat	2005
96	Bill Zedler	Republican	2003
97	Anna Mowery	Republican	1988
98	Vicki Truitt	Republican	1999
99	Charlie Geren	Republican	2001
100	Terri Hodge	Democrat	1997
101	Elvira Reyna	Republican	1993
102	Tony Goolsby	Republican	1989
103	Rafael Anchia	Democrat	2005
104	Roberto R. Alonzo	Democrat	2003 (first time: 1993–1997)
105	Linda Harper-Brown	Republican	2003
106	Ray Allen	Republican	1993
107	Bill Keffer	Republican	2002
108	Dan Branch	Republican	2003
109	Helen Giddings	Democrat	1993
110	Jesse W. Jones	Democrat	1993
111	Yvonne Davis	Democrat	1993
112	Fred Hill	Republican	1989
113	Joe Driver	Republican	1993
114	Will Ford Hartnett	Republican	1991
115	Jim Jackson	Republican	2005
116	Trey Martinez Fischer	Democrat	2001
117	David McQuade Leibowitz	Democrat	2005
118	Charlie Uresti	Democrat	1997
119	Robert R. Puente	Democrat	1991
120	Ruth Jones McClendon	Democrat	1996
121	Vacant		
122	Frank J. Corte, Jr.	Republican	1993
123	Mike Villarreal	Democrat	2000
124	Jose Menendez	Democrat	2001
125	Joaquin Castro	Democrat	2003
126	Peggy Hamric	Republican	1991
127	Joe Crabb	Republican	1993
128	Wayne Smith	Republican	2003
129	John E. Davis	Republican	1999
130	Corbin Van Arsdale	Republican	2003
131	Alma A. Allen	Democrat	2005
132	Bill Callegari	Republican	2001
133	Joe Nixon	Republican	1995
134	Martha Wong	Republican	2003
135	Gary Elkins	Republican	1995
136	Beverly Woolley	Republican	1995
137	Scott Hochberg	Democrat	1993
138	Dwayne Bohac	Republican	2003
139	Sylvester Turner	Democrat	1989
140	Kevin Bailey	Democrat	1991
141	Senfronia Thompson	Democrat	1973
142	Harold V. Dutton, Jr.	Democrat	1985
143	Joe E. Moreno	Democrat	1998
144	Robert E. Talton	Republican	1993
145	Rick Noriega	Democrat	1999
146	Al Edwards	Democrat	1979
147	Garnet Coleman	Democrat	1991
148	Jessica Farrar	Democrat	1995
149	Hubert Vo	Democrat	2005
150	Debbie Riddle	Republican	2002

: In the 2004 General Election, Elizabeth Ames Jones won the District 121 seat but declined it, having received an appointment as a member of the Texas Railroad Commission.

== Membership changes ==
=== Senate ===
None

=== House of Representatives ===
District	Outgoing Representative	Reason for Vacancy	Successor	Date of Successor's Installation
District 48	Todd Baxter	Representative Baxter resigned on 1 November 2005 for personal reasons.	Donna Howard	To be determined
District 106	Ray Allen	Representative Allen resigned on 20 January 2006 for personal reasons.	Kirk England	To be determined
District 121	Vacant	Representative Elizabeth Ames Jones was re-elected but declined her seat after being appointed to the Railroad Commission of Texas.	Joe Straus	10 February 2005
District 143	Joe Moreno	Representative Moreno was killed in a one-car rollover accident 6 May 2005.	Ana E. Hernandez	20 December 2005

- District 48: A special election was held on 17 January 2006. No candidate received a majority of the votes on that date, so the top two candidates will face each other in a runoff. Lieutenant Governor David Dewhurst, as acting governor, set the date of the runoff for 14 February 2006. . Donna Howard won the runoff and was later sworn in.
- District 106: A special election was held on 28 February 2006 . Kirk England won, but, as of 6 March 2006, has not yet been sworn in.
- District 121: A special election was held on 5 February 2005. Joe Straus received a majority of the votes. He was sworn in five days later, on 10 February 2005.
- District 143: A special election was held on 8 November 2005. No candidate received a majority of the votes on that date, so the top two candidates faced each other in a runoff on 10 December 2005. Ana E. Hernandez won the runoff and was sworn in 10 days later, on 20 December 2005.

== Notable events ==
- Sushree Prabhakari Devi, Vice-President of Barsana Dham Hindu Temple, delivered the first ever Hindu prayer in the Texas Senate.
