= 2008 Texas elections =

- November 4, 2008

Elections were held in Texas on November 4, 2008. Primary elections took place on March 4, with runoffs on April 8.

== Federal offices ==
=== President of the United States ===
Texas had 34 electoral votes in the Electoral College, which went to Republican presidential candidate John McCain.

=== United States Class II Senate Seat ===
Incumbent Republican Senator John Cornyn won reelection to a second term against Democratic candidate Rick Noriega.

=== United States House of Representatives ===
There were 32 U.S. Representative seats up for election in Texas. Republicans won 20 seats, while Democrats won 12.

== Executive ==
=== Railroad Commissioner ===
Incumbent Republican commissioner Michael L. Williams won reelection, defeating Democrat Mark Thompson.

== State legislature ==
Elected senators and representatives served in the 81st Texas Legislature.

=== Texas Senate ===
16 of 31 seats in the Texas Senate were up for election.

=== Texas House of Representatives ===
All 150 seats in the Texas House of Representatives were up for election.

== See also ==
- 2008 United States elections
