= 2004 Texas House of Representatives election =

- November 2, 2004

All 150 seats in the Texas House of Representatives 76 seats needed for a majority
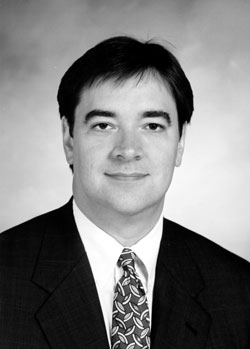
	Majority party	Minority party
	Rep
Leader	Tom Craddick	Jim Dunnam
Party	Republican	Democratic
Leader's seat	82nd	57th
Last election	88	62
Seats won	87	63
Seat change	▼1	▲1
Popular vote	3,777,393	2,284,914
Percentage	61.74%	37.35%
Swing	▲2.78%	▼1.84%
- Republican hold Republican gain Democratic hold Democratic gain Republican: 50–60% 60–70% 70–80% 80–90% ≥90% Democratic: 40–50% 50–60% 60–70% 70–80% 80–90% ≥90%
Speaker before election
Tom Craddick
Republican
Elected Speaker
Tom Craddick
Republican

The 2004 Texas House of Representatives elections took place as part of the biennial United States elections. Texas voters elected state representatives in all 150 State House of Representatives districts. The winners of this election served in the 79th Texas Legislature. State representatives serve for two-year terms. Republicans maintained control of the House, losing one seat to the Democrats.

== Background ==
Following the 2002 elections, the Republicans gained control of the House with 88 seats to the Democrats' 62, giving them a governmental trifecta for the first time since Reconstruction. This led to the 2003 Texas redistricting, where Republicans redrew the state's congressional districts which had been implemented by federal courts for the 2002 elections. In response, 58 Democratic members of the House of Representatives boycotted the session and left the capitol to deprive the chamber of a quorum, preventing the Republican-led chamber from functioning. House Speaker Tom Craddick ordered the arrest of the missing lawmakers. 53 of those members, later known as the "Killer D's," fled to a Holiday Inn in Ardmore, Oklahoma to continue depriving the House of a quorum, attracting the attention of national media, as well as Democrats in the U.S. House of Representatives, who praised their actions. After the regular session ended, Republican governor Rick Perry called a special session to address redistricting.

House Democrats were unable to stage another walkout during the first special session, but Senate Democrats were able to filibuster the bill until the end of the session. Eleven Democratic members of the Texas Senate left the second special session to prevent a quorum. They were unable to block the redistricting package during a third special session, but they staged a symbolic walkout as the package neared passage to delay it over the weekend. After this brief delay, the Senate passed the redistricting bill, ending the six month long legislative saga. Republicans heavily criticized the Democratic Representatives who participated in the walkout, running ads in the districts of White Democrats in competitive districts during the walkout and attempting to defeat them in the 2004 elections. The Democrats similarly targeted their own representatives in the primaries, such as Ron Wilson, Roberto Gutierrez, and Glenn Lewis, for working against the party during the walkout.

== Predictions ==
Source	Ranking	As of
Rothenberg	Safe R	October 1, 2004

== Results ==
In the primary elections on March 9, the Democrats successfully defeated all of the members they targeted for their actions during the 2003 walkout. Additionally, Republicans only managed to defeat two of the Democrats who participated in the walkouts, Dan Ellis and John Mabry. Democrats narrowly flipped seats in San Antonio, Houston, and Austin, including defeating house appropriations chairman Talmadge Heflin. They also narrowly held onto several rural districts that Republicans had targeted. This resulted in a net gain of one seat for the Democrats.

=== Statewide ===
Summary of the November 2, 2004 Texas House of Representatives election results
Party	Candidates	Votes	%	Seats	+/–
Republican Party	111	3,777,393	61.74%	87	▼1
Democratic Party	99	2,284,914	37.35%	63	▲1
Libertarian Party	11	41,720	0.68%	0	–
Independent	2	11,041	0.18%	0	–
Write-in	1	2,801	0.04%	0	–
Total		6,117,869	100.00%	150	–

Popular vote
Republican	61.74%
Democratic	37.35%
Libertarian	0.68%
Independent	0.18%
Write-in	0.04%

House seats won
Republican	58.00%
Democratic	42.00%

=== Close races ===
1. District 149, 0.08% (gain)
2. District 48, 0.21%
3. District 3, 0.46%
4. District 50, 0.88% (gain)
5. District 117, 1.28% (gain)
6. District 35, 1.86%
7. District 12, 2.08%
8. District 106, 5.14%
9. District 11, 5.42%
10. District 1, 5.62%
11. District 69, 6.20%
12. District 102, 6.38%
13. District 56, 6.44% (gain)
14. District 45, 9.12%
15. District 18, 9.14% (gain)
16. District 134, 9.24%
17. District 17, 9.48%

=== Results by district ===
District	Democratic		Republican		Others		Total		Result
District	Votes	%	Votes	%	Votes	%	Votes	%	Result
District 1	28,495	52.81%	25,463	47.19%	-	-	53,958	100.00%	Democratic hold
District 2	-	-	36,888	100.00%	-	-	36,888	100.00%	Republican hold
District 3	24,331	50.23%	24,113	49.77%	-	-	48,444	100.00%	Democratic hold
District 4	-	-	41,964	100.00%	-	-	41,964	100.00%	Republican hold
District 5	23,029	38.03%	37,529	61.97%	-	-	60,558	100.00%	Republican hold
District 6	-	-	43,089	100.00%	-	-	43,089	100.00%	Republican hold
District 7	-	-	40,787	100.00%	-	-	40,787	100.00%	Republican hold
District 8	-	-	33,181	100.00%	-	-	33,181	100.00%	Republican hold
District 9	21,679	43.11%	28,613	56.89%	-	-	50,292	100.00%	Republican hold
District 10	15,732	27.21%	42,089	72.79%	-	-	57,821	100.00%	Republican hold
District 11	26,885	52.71%	24,123	47.29%	-	-	51,008	100.00%	Democratic hold
District 12	24,974	51.04%	23,954	48.96%	-	-	48,928	100.00%	Democratic hold
District 13	-	-	36,388	100.00%	-	-	36,388	100.00%	Republican hold
District 14	-	-	38,328	100.00%	-	-	38,328	100.00%	Republican hold
District 15	-	-	56,445	90.75%	5,753	9.25%	62,198	100.00%	Republican hold
District 16	-	-	41,495	100.00%	-	-	41,495	100.00%	Republican hold
District 17	29,706	53.66%	24,459	44.18%	1,192	2.15%	55,357	100.00%	Democratic hold
District 18	21,925	45.43%	26,337	54.57%	-	-	48,262	100.00%	Republican gain
District 19	23,648	44.57%	29,411	55.43%	-	-	53,059	100.00%	Republican hold
District 20	22,202	31.22%	48,920	68.78%	-	-	71,122	100.00%	Republican hold
District 21	33,094	100.00%	-	-	-	-	33,094	100.00%	Democratic hold
District 22	31,612	93.73%	-	-	2,113	6.27%	33,725	100.00%	Democratic hold
District 23	34,728	100.00%	-	-	-	-	34,728	100.00%	Democratic hold
District 24	-	-	43,846	100.00%	-	-	43,846	100.00%	Republican hold
District 25	15,514	33.98%	30,139	66.02%	-	-	45,653	100.00%	Republican hold
District 26	-	-	43,538	100.00%	-	-	43,538	100.00%	Republican hold
District 27	40,673	100.00%	-	-	-	-	40,673	100.00%	Democratic hold
District 28	22,561	35.87%	40,338	64.13%	-	-	62,899	100.00%	Republican hold
District 29	-	-	40,380	100.00%	-	-	40,380	100.00%	Republican hold
District 30	-	-	35,793	87.40%	5,158	12.60%	40,951	100.00%	Republican hold
District 31	20,052	100.00%	-	-	-	-	20,052	100.00%	Democratic hold
District 32	-	-	37,240	100.00%	-	-	37,240	100.00%	Republican hold
District 33	30,481	100.00%	-	-	-	-	30,481	100.00%	Democratic hold
District 34	23,175	55.05%	18,924	44.95%	-	-	42,099	100.00%	Democratic hold
District 35	23,165	50.93%	22,316	49.07%	-	-	45,481	100.00%	Democratic hold
District 36	18,503	100.00%	-	-	-	-	18,503	100.00%	Democratic hold
District 37	16,929	100.00%	-	-	-	-	16,929	100.00%	Democratic hold
District 38	20,164	100.00%	-	-	-	-	20,164	100.00%	Democratic hold
District 39	16,335	100.00%	-	-	-	-	16,335	100.00%	Democratic hold
District 40	16,211	100.00%	-	-	-	-	16,211	100.00%	Democratic hold
District 41	17,606	100.00%	-	-	-	-	17,606	100.00%	Democratic hold
District 42	27,123	100.00%	-	-	-	-	27,123	100.00%	Democratic hold
District 43	20,047	59.31%	13,756	40.69%	-	-	33,803	100.00%	Democratic hold
District 44	-	-	44,492	100.00%	-	-	44,492	100.00%	Republican hold
District 45	34,264	54.56%	28,536	45.44%	-	-	62,800	100.00%	Democratic hold
District 46	29,875	100.00%	-	-	-	-	29,875	100.00%	Democratic hold
District 47	-	-	49,075	100.00%	-	-	49,075	100.00%	Republican hold
District 48	34,258	49.89%	34,405	50.11%	-	-	68,663	100.00%	Republican hold
District 49	46,818	85.85%	-	-	7,714	14.15%	54,532	100.00%	Democratic hold
District 50	31,401	48.59%	30,832	47.71%	2,390	3.70%	64,623	100.00%	Democratic gain
District 51	26,856	100.00%	-	-	-	-	26,856	100.00%	Democratic hold
District 52	-	-	41,102	93.62%	2,801	6.38%	43,903	100.00%	Republican hold
District 53	-	-	46,020	100.00%	-	-	46,020	100.00%	Republican hold
District 54	18,594	39.14%	28,907	60.86%	-	-	47,501	100.00%	Republican hold
District 55	-	-	37,312	100.00%	-	-	37,312	100.00%	Republican hold
District 56	27,288	46.78%	31,042	53.22%	-	-	58,330	100.00%	Republican gain
District 57	23,765	58.33%	16,974	41.67%	-	-	40,739	100.00%	Democratic hold
District 58	16,020	30.21%	37,001	69.79%	-	-	53,021	100.00%	Republican hold
District 59	15,603	36.10%	27,621	63.90%	-	-	43,224	100.00%	Republican hold
District 60	16,536	30.12%	38,368	69.88%	-	-	54,904	100.00%	Republican hold
District 61	-	-	47,315	100.00%	-	-	47,315	100.00%	Republican hold
District 62	-	-	39,128	100.00%	-	-	39,128	100.00%	Republican hold
District 63	-	-	58,785	100.00%	-	-	58,785	100.00%	Republican hold
District 64	-	-	44,577	100.00%	-	-	44,577	100.00%	Republican hold
District 65	-	-	41,407	86.44%	6,497	13.56%	47,904	100.00%	Republican hold
District 66	-	-	47,071	100.00%	-	-	47,071	100.00%	Republican hold
District 67	-	-	33,134	100.00%	-	-	33,134	100.00%	Republican hold
District 68	-	-	39,454	100.00%	-	-	39,454	100.00%	Republican hold
District 69	25,928	53.10%	22,904	46.90%	-	-	48,832	100.00%	Democratic hold
District 70	18,451	23.97%	58,520	76.03%	-	-	76,971	100.00%	Republican hold
District 71	-	-	41,479	89.77%	4,727	10.23%	46,206	100.00%	Republican hold
District 72	19,387	42.78%	25,926	57.22%	-	-	45,313	100.00%	Republican hold
District 73	-	-	60,504	100.00%	-	-	60,504	100.00%	Republican hold
District 74	28,497	100.00%	-	-	-	-	28,497	100.00%	Democratic hold
District 75	22,040	100.00%	-	-	-	-	22,040	100.00%	Democratic hold
District 76	25,010	100.00%	-	-	-	-	25,010	100.00%	Democratic hold
District 77	20,647	100.00%	-	-	-	-	20,647	100.00%	Democratic hold
District 78	-	-	30,114	100.00%	-	-	30,114	100.00%	Republican hold
District 79	21,053	66.59%	10,561	33.41%	-	-	31,614	100.00%	Democratic hold
District 80	28,230	100.00%	-	-	-	-	28,230	100.00%	Democratic hold
District 81	10,379	24.91%	31,288	75.09%	-	-	41,667	100.00%	Republican hold
District 82	-	-	42,237	100.00%	-	-	42,237	100.00%	Republican hold
District 83	12,561	21.33%	46,321	78.67%	-	-	58,882	100.00%	Republican hold
District 84	14,562	31.89%	31,098	68.11%	-	-	45,660	100.00%	Republican hold
District 85	25,602	58.76%	17,967	41.24%	-	-	43,569	100.00%	Democratic hold
District 86	-	-	49,536	100.00%	-	-	49,536	100.00%	Republican hold
District 87	-	-	29,812	100.00%	-	-	29,812	100.00%	Republican hold
District 88	-	-	39,293	100.00%	-	-	39,293	100.00%	Republican hold
District 89	16,591	23.54%	53,875	76.46%	-	-	70,466	100.00%	Republican hold
District 90	14,841	65.22%	7,913	34.78%	-	-	22,754	100.00%	Democratic hold
District 91	-	-	38,560	100.00%	-	-	38,560	100.00%	Republican hold
District 92	-	-	40,707	100.00%	-	-	40,707	100.00%	Republican hold
District 93	17,924	43.94%	22,866	56.06%	-	-	40,790	100.00%	Republican hold
District 94	21,262	36.89%	36,377	63.11%	-	-	57,639	100.00%	Republican hold
District 95	33,769	100.00%	-	-	-	-	33,769	100.00%	Democratic hold
District 96	26,447	39.67%	40,224	60.33%	-	-	66,671	100.00%	Republican hold
District 97	23,425	36.76%	40,306	63.24%	-	-	63,731	100.00%	Republican hold
District 98	-	-	64,337	100.00%	-	-	64,337	100.00%	Republican hold
District 99	17,602	30.33%	40,441	69.67%	-	-	58,043	100.00%	Republican hold
District 100	24,558	100.00%	-	-	-	-	24,558	100.00%	Democratic hold
District 101	-	-	28,527	100.00%	-	-	28,527	100.00%	Republican hold
District 102	18,881	46.81%	21,457	53.19%	-	-	40,338	100.00%	Republican hold
District 103	13,169	100.00%	-	-	-	-	13,169	100.00%	Democratic hold
District 104	15,328	100.00%	-	-	-	-	15,328	100.00%	Democratic hold
District 105	14,884	40.80%	21,599	59.20%	-	-	36,483	100.00%	Republican hold
District 106	16,987	47.43%	18,828	52.57%	-	-	35,815	100.00%	Republican hold
District 107	-	-	31,609	100.00%	-	-	31,609	100.00%	Republican hold
District 108	19,010	37.50%	31,684	62.50%	-	-	50,694	100.00%	Republican hold
District 109	43,932	100.00%	-	-	-	-	43,932	100.00%	Democratic hold
District 110	27,720	100.00%	-	-	-	-	27,720	100.00%	Democratic hold
District 111	37,129	100.00%	-	-	-	-	37,129	100.00%	Democratic hold
District 112	17,947	34.24%	34,473	65.76%	-	-	52,420	100.00%	Republican hold
District 113	16,272	34.88%	30,376	65.12%	-	-	46,648	100.00%	Republican hold
District 114	-	-	31,810	100.00%	-	-	31,810	100.00%	Republican hold
District 115	-	-	37,739	100.00%	-	-	37,739	100.00%	Republican hold
District 116	23,436	64.21%	13,061	35.79%	-	-	36,497	100.00%	Democratic hold
District 117	19,707	50.64%	19,209	49.36%	-	-	38,916	100.00%	Democratic gain
District 118	21,265	56.79%	16,183	43.21%	-	-	37,448	100.00%	Democratic hold
District 119	22,939	62.37%	13,839	37.63%	-	-	36,778	100.00%	Democratic hold
District 120	27,268	100.00%	-	-	-	-	27,268	100.00%	Democratic hold
District 121	-	-	46,997	100.00%	-	-	46,997	100.00%	Republican hold
District 122	-	-	66,896	100.00%	-	-	66,896	100.00%	Republican hold
District 123	21,769	61.60%	13,570	38.40%	-	-	35,339	100.00%	Democratic hold
District 124	28,652	100.00%	-	-	-	-	28,652	100.00%	Democratic hold
District 125	30,234	100.00%	-	-	-	-	30,234	100.00%	Democratic hold
District 126	15,460	30.72%	34,865	69.28%	-	-	50,325	100.00%	Republican hold
District 127	18,261	29.56%	43,525	70.44%	-	-	61,786	100.00%	Republican hold
District 128	13,807	34.67%	26,014	65.33%	-	-	39,821	100.00%	Republican hold
District 129	-	-	40,002	100.00%	-	-	40,002	100.00%	Republican hold
District 130	-	-	54,026	92.42%	4,432	7.58%	58,458	100.00%	Republican hold
District 131	28,474	100.00%	-	-	-	-	28,474	100.00%	Democratic hold
District 132	-	-	40,328	100.00%	-	-	40,328	100.00%	Republican hold
District 133	-	-	21,184	78.27%	5,883	21.73%	27,067	100.00%	Republican hold
District 134	29,806	44.33%	36,021	53.57%	1,408	2.09%	67,235	100.00%	Republican hold
District 135	-	-	31,014	100.00%	-	-	31,014	100.00%	Republican hold
District 136	-	-	41,719	90.32%	4,469	9.68%	46,188	100.00%	Republican hold
District 137	10,565	56.62%	8,095	43.38%	-	-	18,660	100.00%	Democratic hold
District 138	13,201	36.25%	23,217	63.75%	-	-	36,418	100.00%	Republican hold
District 139	30,151	100.00%	-	-	-	-	30,151	100.00%	Democratic hold
District 140	12,061	67.45%	5,821	32.55%	-	-	17,882	100.00%	Democratic hold
District 141	27,490	100.00%	-	-	-	-	27,490	100.00%	Democratic hold
District 142	28,969	80.15%	7,175	19.85%	-	-	36,144	100.00%	Democratic hold
District 143	13,282	92.84%	-	-	1,025	7.16%	14,307	100.00%	Democratic hold
District 144	-	-	25,873	100.00%	-	-	25,873	100.00%	Republican hold
District 145	15,160	100.00%	-	-	-	-	15,160	100.00%	Democratic hold
District 146	36,773	100.00%	-	-	-	-	36,773	100.00%	Democratic hold
District 147	32,566	100.00%	-	-	-	-	32,566	100.00%	Democratic hold
District 148	21,041	100.00%	-	-	-	-	21,041	100.00%	Democratic hold
District 149	20,695	50.04%	20,662	49.96%	-	-	41,357	100.00%	Democratic gain
District 150	-	-	44,425	100.00%	-	-	44,425	100.00%	Republican hold
Total	2,284,914	37.35%	3,777,393	61.74%	166,882	0.91%	4,320,800	100.00%	
