= Rob Eissler =

American politician from Texas

Member of the Texas House of Representatives from the 15th district
- In office 2003–2013
- Preceded by: Tommy Williams
- Succeeded by: Steve Toth

Personal details
- Party: Republican

Rob Eissler is an American politician who was elected member of the Texas House of Representatives.

In the 2012 Texas House of Representatives election, was unseated in the primary by Steve Toth.

== See also ==
- 78th Texas Legislature
- 79th Texas Legislature
- 80th Texas Legislature
- 81st Texas Legislature
- 82nd Texas Legislature
