= Ken Bryant =

Australian rules footballer

Personal information
- Full name: Kenneth William Bryant
- Born: 12 November 1922; Melbourne
- Died: 17 May 1990 (aged 67); Richmond, Victoria
- Height: 183 cm (6 ft 0 in)
- Weight: 80 kg (176 lb)

Playing career^{1}
Years	Club	Games (Goals)
1943	St Kilda	3 (0)
- ^{1} Playing statistics correct to the end of 1943.

Kenneth William Bryant (12 November 1922 – 17 May 1990) was an Australian rules footballer who played with St Kilda in the Victorian Football League (VFL).

Bryant played three games for St Kilda while serving in the Royal Australian Air Force during World War II.
