= Fred Brown (Texas politician) =

American politician

Member of the Texas House of Representatives from the 14th district
- In office 1999–2011
- Succeeded by: John N. Raney

Personal details
- Party: Republican

Fred Brown is an American politician. A member of the Republican Party, he was a member of the Texas House of Representatives for the 14th district.

Brown served as mayor of College Station. In 2023, he ran for precinct 3 commissioner for the Brazos County Commissioners Court.

== See also ==
- 79th Texas Legislature
- 78th Texas Legislature
- 80th Texas Legislature
- 81st Texas Legislature
- 82nd Texas Legislature
