= Glenda Dawson =

American politician from Texas

Member of the Texas House of Representatives for District 29
- In office 2002–2006

Personal details
- Died: September 12, 2006 (aged 65)
- Party: Republican

Glenda Dawson (died September 12, 2006) was an American politician. She served in the Texas House of Representatives from District 29 from 2002 to 2006.

In the 2006 Texas House of Representatives election, she was re-elected posthumously. The Glenda Dawson High School in Pearland, Texas was named in her memory.
