= Texas's 131st House of Representatives district =

American legislative district

Texas's 131st State House of Representatives district
Representative
Alma Allen; D–Houston
- Demographics: 5.3% White; 34.9% Black; 53.5% Hispanic; 7.0% Asian
- Population (2020) • Voting age: 202,667; 146,134

The 131st district of the Texas House of Representatives contains a portion of Harris county. The current representative is Alma Allen, who was first elected in 2004.
