= Mary Denny =

American politician

Mary Diane Denny is an American retired politician.

Denny was elected to the Texas House of Representatives from District 63 between 1993 and 2007 as a Republican. During her tenure as a state legislator, Denny lived in Aubrey, Texas.
