= Vilma Luna =

American politician

Member of the Texas House of Representatives from the 33rd district
- In office May 4, 1993 – July 31, 2006
- Preceded by: Robert Earley
- Succeeded by: Solomon Ortiz Jr.

Personal details
- Party: Democratic

Vilma Luna is an American politician who served in the Texas House of Representatives from the 33rd district from 1993 to 2006.
