= Texas's 75th House of Representatives district =

American legislative district

Texas's 75th State House of Representatives district
Representative
Mary González; D–El Paso
- Demographics: 5.6% White; 3.1% Black; 90.5% Hispanic; 1.2% Asian
- Population (2020) • Voting age: 200,505; 137,361

The 75th district of the Texas House of Representatives consists of a portion of El Paso County. The current representative is Mary González, who has represented the district since 2013.

== Members ==
- Chente Quintanilla (2003–2013)
- Mary González (since 2013)
