= Peggy Hamric =

American politician

Member of the Texas House of Representatives from the 126th district
- In office March 14, 1991 – January 9, 2007
- Preceded by: Barry Connelly
- Succeeded by: Patricia Harless

Personal details
- Born: July 25, 1940 (age 86)
- Party: Republican

Peggy Hamric (born July 25, 1940) is an American politician who served in the Texas House of Representatives from the 126th district from 1991 to 2007.
