= Elvira Reyna =

American politician

Member of the Texas House of Representatives from the 101st district
- In office December 13, 1993 – January 9, 2007
- Preceded by: Bill Blackwood
- Succeeded by: Thomas Latham

Personal details
- Party: Republican

Elvira Reyna is an American politician who served in the Texas House of Representatives from the 101st district from 1993 to 2007.
