= Paul Moreno =

American politician

Member of the Texas House of Representatives from the 77th district 72nd (1975–1993)
- In office 1975–2009

Member of the Texas House of Representatives from the 67th district
- In office 1967–1973

Personal details
- Born: Pablo Cruz Moreno; April 28, 1931 Alamogordo, New Mexico
- Died: September 1, 2017 (aged 86)
- Party: Democratic
- Education: University of Texas at El Paso (BBA)

Military service
- Allegiance: United States
- Branch/service: Marine Corps
- Battles/wars: Korean War

Pablo (Paul) Cruz Moreno (April 28, 1931 – September 1, 2017) was State Representative for the 77th District of El Paso, Texas, USA.

== Early life and education ==
He was born in Alamogordo, New Mexico but raised in El Paso's El Segundo Barrio, and after high school he enlisted in the U.S. Marine Corps serving in the Korean War. He received his BBA from the University of Texas at El Paso, and attended but did not complete his JD from the University of Texas at Austin.

== Career ==
Moreno was first elected to the Texas House in 1967 and served for 40 years, becoming the "conscience" of the body. He was the longest-serving Hispanic elected official in the United States, and presided as the Dean of the Texas House. Moreno co-founded the Mexican American Legislative Caucus of the Texas House of Representatives, a co-founder of El Paso Legal Assistance, and a founding member of the Tejano Democrats.

He was defeated by Marisa Marquez in the 2008 Democratic primary for the 77th district.

In 2011, the Mexican American Legal Defense and Educational Fund (MALDEF) honored Moreno with the organization's Lifetime Achievement Award.

Paul C Moreno Elementary School was named in his honor.
