= Toby Goodman =

American politician (1948–2021)

Member of the Texas House of Representatives from the 93rd district
- In office January 8, 1991 – January 9, 2007
- Preceded by: Chris Harris
- Succeeded by: Paula Hightower Pierson

Personal details
- Born: November 2, 1948 Wichita Falls, Texas
- Died: July 18, 2021 (aged 72) Mansfield, Texas
- Party: Republican

Toby Goodman (November 2, 1948 – July 18, 2021) was an American politician who served in the Texas House of Representatives from the 93rd district from 1991 to 2007.

He died of a heart attack on July 18, 2021, in Mansfield, Texas, at age 72.
