= Kevin Bailey (politician) =

American politician (born 1951)

Kevin E. Bailey (born January 8, 1951) was a Democratic member of the Texas House of Representatives who represented the 140th district in Houston from 1991 through 2009. He received $27,000 from TED PAC.

Bailey was born in Farmington, Maine, and attended the University of Texas at El Paso, Sam Houston State University, and the University of Houston.University of Oklahoma
