= Terri Hodge =

American politician

Member of the Texas House of Representatives from the 100th district
- In office January 14, 1997 – March 8, 2010
- Preceded by: Samuel Hudson III
- Succeeded by: Eric Johnson

Personal details
- Born: Gladys E. Hodge
- Party: Democratic
- Children: 1

Gladys E. 'Terri' Hodge was an American politician who served in the Texas House of Representatives for the 100th district from 1997 to 2010. Hodge resigned from office after pleading guilty to fraud and filing false statements on tax returns, and served a year in prison.
