= Chente Quintanilla =

American politician

Member of Texas House of Representatives for District 75
- In office 2003–2013
- Succeeded by: Mary González

Personal details
- Party: Democratic

Inocente "Chente" Quintanilla is an American politician. He was a member of the Texas House of Representatives from 2003 to 2013.

He was a candidate for his old seat in 2016. He endorsed the Julian Castro 2020 presidential campaign.
