= Lon Burnam =

American politician (born 1953)

Member of the Texas House of Representatives from the 90th district
- In office 1996–2014
- Succeeded by: Ramon Romero Jr.

Personal details
- Born: Lon Maxwell Burnam; July 11, 1953 (age 73)
- Party: Democratic
- Spouse: Carol
- Education: University of Texas at Austin; University of Texas at Arlington
- Profession: Politician

Lon Maxwell Burnam (born July 11, 1953) is a former member of the Texas House of Representatives for District 90, which encompasses downtown Fort Worth, Texas, and surrounding areas. A Democrat, Burnam is the former executive director of the Dallas Peace Center. He was initially elected to the state House in 1996.

On March 2, 2016, Burnam ran last with 269,853 votes (24.8 percent) in a three-candidate field in the Democratic primary election for the seat on the Texas Railroad Commission being vacated by the Republican David J. Porter. The two remaining Democratic candidates, Cody Garrett, who polled 382,647 votes (35.2 percent), and Grady Yarbrough, with 434,137 votes (40 percent), met in the May 24 runoff election to choose the party nominee for the position.

Burnam holds a bachelor's degree in government from the University of Texas at Austin. He holds two master's degree, one from UT-Austin and the second in municipal and regional planning from the University of Texas at Arlington. He is a member of the Society of Friends or the Quaker Church.

In 2007 when Representative Debbie Riddle authored HB1034 to amend the Texas pledge of allegiance to the state flag by adding the words "one state under God" in order to acknowledge our "Judeo-Christian heritage", Burnam challenged her, noting the many denominations present in Texas that do not align with that heritage. Representative Riddle replied, "The purpose of this bill is to have our state pledge mirror our national pledge. Our national pledge says, 'one nation under God.' [added 1954] I think it is altogether right and appropriate..." HB1034 passed May 4, 2007.

He was dragged out from a public meeting in August 2026.
