= Linda Harper-Brown =

American politician (born 1948)

Member of the Texas House of Representatives from the 105th district
- In office 2003 – 2015
- Preceded by: Dale Tillery
- Succeeded by: Rodney Anderson

Personal details
- Born: March 20, 1948 (age 78)
- Party: Republican Party of Texas
- Spouse: William E. Brown
- Occupation: Politician

Linda Harper-Brown (born March 20, 1948) is an American politician who served as a member of the Texas House of Representatives from 2003 to 2015. She was a member of the House's Transportation Committee. Harper-Brown was previously elected to the Irving, Texas, city council in 1997. She was also a former school board member and Board President of the Irving Schools Foundation.

== Electoral history ==
2012 Texas House of Representatives election for the 105th district
Party	Candidate	Votes	%
Republican	Linda Harper-Brown	21,705	50.07
Democratic	Rosemary Robbins	20,923	48.26
Green	Saul Arechar	725	1.67
Total votes		43,353	100

2010 Texas House of Representatives election for the 105th district
Party	Candidate	Votes	%
Republican	Linda Harper-Brown	11,286	51.71
Democratic	Loretta Haldenwang	9,799	44.90
Libertarian	Cecil Anthony Ince	740	3.39
Total votes		21,825	100

2008 Texas House of Representatives election for the 105th district
Party	Candidate	Votes	%
Republican	Linda Harper-Brown	19,857	48.72
Democratic	Bob Romano	19,838	48.68
Libertarian	James G. Baird	1,061	2.60
Total votes		40,756	100

2006 Texas House of Representatives election for the 105th district
Party	Candidate	Votes	%
Republican	Linda Harper-Brown	11,881	55.09
Democratic	Bob Romano	8,865	41.10
Libertarian	John Turner	822	3.81
Total votes		21,568	100

2004 Texas House of Representatives election for the 105th district
Party	Candidate	Votes	%
Republican	Linda Harper-Brown	21,599	59.20
Democratic	Mike Moore	14,884	40.80
Total votes		36,483	100

2002 Texas House of Representatives election for the 105th district
Party	Candidate	Votes	%
Republican	Linda Harper-Brown	13,461	75.85
Libertarian	Robert Mohler	1,249	7.04
Green	Sheril Blackmon	653	3.68
Independent	Bob Romano	2,385	13.44
Total votes		17,748	100
