= Larry Phillips (Texas politician) =

American judge and politician

Judge of the Texas 59th Judicial District Court
- Incumbent
- Assumed office May 1, 2018
- Preceded by: Rayburn Nall

Member of the Texas House of Representatives from the 62nd district
- In office January 14, 2003 – April 30, 2018
- Preceded by: Ron Clark
- Succeeded by: Reggie Smith

Personal details
- Born: Lawrence Augustine Phillips
- Party: Republican
- Education: Baylor University; University of Houston

Lawrence Augustine Phillips is an American judge and politician. He served as a Republican member for the 62nd district of the Texas House of Representatives.

Phillips attended Baylor University, earning his bachelor's degree. He also attended the University of Houston, earning his Juris Doctor degree. In 2002, he was elected to the 62nd district of the Texas House of Representatives, and assumed office in 2003, succeeding Ron Clark. In 2018, he was succeeded by Reggie Smith.

Phillips has served as a judge of the Texas District Courts for Grayson County, Texas since May 1, 2018.
