= Bill Callegari =

American politician

Texas State Representative from District 130 (northwestern Harris County)
- In office January 9, 2001 – January 14, 2003
- Preceded by: John Culberson
- Succeeded by: Corbin Van Arsdale

Texas State Representative from District 132 (northwestern Harris County)
- In office January 14, 2003 – January 13, 2015
- Preceded by: Scott Hochberg (switched to District 137)
- Succeeded by: Mike Schofield

Personal details
- Born: September 23, 1941 (age 84) Cottonport, Avoyelles Parish; Louisiana, USA
- Party: Republican
- Spouse: Ann Callegari
- Children: Four children
- Education: Louisiana State University; University of Houston
- Occupation: Businessman; Civil engineer

William Anthony Callegari Sr. (born September 23, 1941), is a businessman and civil engineer from Katy, a suburb of Houston, Texas, who was a Republican member of the Texas House of Representatives. From 2001 to 2003, he represented District 130; in 2003, he was switched to neighboring District 132 in northwestern Harris County.

Political offices
Texas House of Representatives
Preceded by John Culberson	Texas State Representative from District 130 (northwestern Harris County); 2001–2003	Succeeded by Corbin Van Arsdale
Preceded by Scott Hochberg (switched to District 137)	Texas State Representative from District 132 (northwestern Harris County); 2003–2015	Succeeded by Mike Schofield
