= Delwin Jones =

American politician

Delwin L. Jones
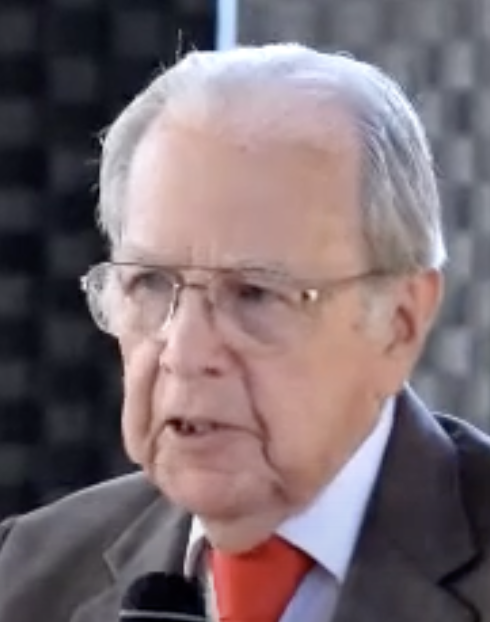

Texas State Representative for Lubbock (assorted districts)
- In office November 23, 1964 – January 9, 1973
- Preceded by: J. Collier Adams
- Succeeded by: Pete Laney

Member of the Texas House of Representatives from the 83rd district
- In office January 10, 1989 – January 11, 2011
- Preceded by: Ron Givens
- Succeeded by: Charles Lee Perry

Personal details
- Born: April 2, 1924 Lubbock, Texas
- Died: July 25, 2018 (aged 94)
- Party: Republican
- Spouse: Reta A. Jones (died 2014)
- Education: Texas Tech University
- Occupation: Businessman; Farmer

Military service
- Branch/service: United States Army Air Corps
- Battles/wars: World War II

Delwin L. Jones (April 2, 1924 – July 25, 2018) was an American politician, who, prior to 2011, was the oldest member of the Texas House of Representatives.

In the Republican primary held on May 29, 2012, Jones, at the age of eighty-eight, failed in a bid to unseat Perry. Jones survived his illness.

In 2015, Jones received the George Mahon Award, named for former U.S. Representative George Mahon, from the Lubbock Professional Chapter of the Association for Women in Communications.

== Death ==
Jones died at the age of 94. He was interred at the Texas State Cemetery in Austin. Former state Senator Robert Duncan described Jones as "always involved in different types of activities, as a volunteer at the Lions Club, and ... active in the Republican Party, helping the new candidates learn the ropes and understand how to get elected.”

Preceded by J. Collier Adams	Texas State Representative for Lubbock County (assorted districts); 1964–1973	Succeeded by Pete Laney
Preceded by Ron Givens	Texas State Representative for District 83 (Cochran, Gaines, Hockley, Lubbock, and Yoakum counties); 1989–2011	Succeeded by Charles Lee Perry
