= Texas's 99th House of Representatives district =

Electoral district of Texas

Texas's 99th State House of Representatives district
Representative
Charlie Geren; R–Fort Worth

District 99 is a district in the Texas House of Representatives. It has been represented by Republican Charlie Geren since 2001.

== Geography ==
The district contains parts of the Tarrant County.

== Members ==
- Kenny Marchant (1987–2001)
- Charlie Geren (since 2001)
