= Betty Brown =

American politician (born 1939)

Betty J. Brown

Member of the Texas House of Representatives from the 4th district
- In office January 6, 1999 – January 2011
- Preceded by: Keith Oakley
- Succeeded by: Lance Gooden

Personal details
- Born: August 20, 1939 (age 87)
- Party: Republican
- Education: Southern Methodist University
- Occupation: Rancher

Betty J. Brown (born August 20, 1939) is an American politician and rancher who was a member of the Texas House of Representatives from 1999 to 2011.

== Career ==
From 1999 to 2011, Brown represented House District 4 for Henderson and Kaufman counties. When she was initially elected to the position in 1998, the district included Kaufman and Hunt counties. After two terms, the district was changed to Kaufman and Henderson counties as far east as Athens, Texas.

In the March 2010 Republican primary, Brown was defeated by Lance Gooden, her former legislative aide.

=== Controversy ===
In 2009, Brown was criticized for her comments made during Texas House Elections Committee testimony on the voting difficulties encountered by Asian Americans who use two different names. During the testimony, Brown suggested that Asian-Americans adopt names that are "easier for Americans to deal with". Though at first defending her statement, accusing Democrats of making the issue "about race", she eventually apologized for the incident, acknowledging the "diversity of Texas" and the "enrichment" that Asian-Americans bring to the state.

Texas House of Representatives
| Preceded by Keith Oakley | Texas State Representative for District 4 (Henderson and Kaufman counties); 1999-2011 | Succeeded by Lance Gooden |
