= Joe Deshotel =

American politician (born 1951)

Member of the Texas House of Representatives from the 22nd district
- In office January 12, 1999 – January 10, 2023
- Preceded by: Al Price
- Succeeded by: Christian Manuel

Personal details
- Born: December 3, 1951 (age 74) Beaumont, Texas, U.S.
- Party: Democratic
- Children: 1
- Education: Lamar University (BS); Texas Southern University (JD)
- Occupation: Attorney

Military service
- Allegiance: United States
- Branch/service: United States Air Force
- Rank: Technical Sergeant
- Unit: Reserves

Joseph Dwain Deshotel (born December 3, 1951) is an American attorney, politician, and businessman who served as a member of the Texas House of Representatives from the 22nd district between 1999 and 2023.

== Background ==
Deshotel was born and raised in Beaumont, Texas and attended Monsignor Kelly Catholic High School. Deshotel received his bachelor's degree in political science from Lamar University in 1974 and a Juris Doctor from Thurgood Marshall School of Law at Texas Southern University in 1978.

== Career ==
Deshotel has been an attorney, businessman, and Technical Sergeant in the United States Air Force Reserves.

Deshotel was elected to the Texas House of Representatives after he ran unopposed in 1998. He has run unopposed in each election since, except in 2004, 2006, and 2008, when he faced Libertarian opponents. However, he faced no significant threat, as he received the vast majority of the votes each year.

He was one of only three members in his 25-member freshman class to receive the Rising Star Award.

In 2015, he served as the chair of the Land and Resource Management committee. He has also served on the Special Committee on Redistricting. As of 2017, he is Chair of the Select Committee on Texas Ports, Innovation & Infrastructure and a member of the Public Education Committee and the Economic & Small Business Development Committee.

He has previously served on several committees, including the House Appropriations, House Economic Development, Transportation, and Redistricting committees. He was also the chairman of Budget Oversight for the House Elections Committee and the vice chair of the Local & Consent Calendars.

In November 2021, Deshotel announced he would retire at the end of his term in 2022, citing a desire to focus on family after nearly three decades in public service. He said he was looking forward to “spending some ‘Joe time’” following his long career in the Texas Legislature

== Personal life ==
Deshotel has one son. In 2021, he announced his engagement to Jennifer Roy.

Texas House of Representatives
Preceded by Al Price	Member of the Texas House of Representatives from the 22nd district 1999–2023	Succeeded by Christian Manuel
