= Dora Olivo =

American politician

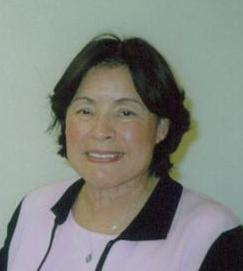

Member of the Texas House of Representatives from the 27th district
- In office 1997–2011
- Preceded by: Huey McCoulskey
- Succeeded by: Ron Reynolds

Personal details
- Born: March 6, 1943 (age 83)
- Party: Democratic
- Spouse: Victor Olivo Jr.
- Children: Victor Olivo, III; Geraldo Olivo
- Education: University of Houston; University of Houston Law Center
- Profession: Attorney

Dora F. Olivo was a Democratic former member of the Texas House of Representatives, representing the 27th District from 1997 to 2011, she succeeded Huey McCoulskey. She was defeated in the 2010 Democratic primary by Ron Reynolds, her fellow attorney.

Olivo was also defeated in a comeback attempt in the 2012 general election in District 85 by the Republican Phil Stephenson, a certified public accountant from Wharton. Stephenson received 28,626 votes (58.3%) to Olivo's 20,435 (41.7%).

== Family ==
Dora is married to her husband Victor Jr., and together they have two children: Victor, III, and Geraldo.

== Education ==
Olivo obtained her Bachelor of Science in education from Texas A&M University, Kingsville. She later received her Master of Science in early childhood education from the University of Houston. In 1981, she received her juris doctor from the University of Houston.

== Professional experience ==
- From 1977 to 1992, Olivo was the founder and host of Lo Nuestro Radio Show, KFRD.
- Olivo is an attorney
- Olivo was a teacher for the Corpus Christi Independent School District and Lamar Consolidated Independent School District.
