= Warren Chisum =

American politician (born 1938)

Warren D. Chisum (born July 4, 1938) is an American politician who served in the Texas House of Representatives from 1989 to 2013.

== Legislative career ==
Chisum started his political career as a Democrat, but he party switched to the Republican Party on June 26, 1995 during the 74th Texas legislature.

== Personal life ==
Chisum was born in Miami, Texas and was raised in Pampa. He graduated from Lefors High School in 1957. He has two children with his wife Omega and is a Baptist.
