= David Swinford =

American politician (1941–2022)

David Anthony Swinford (June 28, 1941 – December 31, 2022) was an American politician.

== Biography ==
Swinford was born in Wichita Falls, Texas, and went to Frenship High School in Wolfforth. He received his bachelor's degree from Texas Tech University in agricultural education. Swinford also went to South Plains College in Levelland, Texas. He lived in Dumas, Texas, with his wife and family and was involved in the grain business. Swinford served in the Texas House of Representatives from 1990 to 2010 representing District 87 as a Republican.
