= Mark S. Homer =

American politician (born 1962)

Member of the Texas House of Representatives from the 3rd district
- In office January 12, 1999 – January 11, 2011
- Preceded by: Lyndon Pete Patterson
- Succeeded by: Erwin Cain

Personal details
- Born: August 28, 1962 (age 63)
- Party: Democratic
- Education: Texas A&M University; Angelo State University

Mark Homer (born August 28, 1962) is a former Democratic politician who represented District 3 in the Texas House of Representatives from 1999 to 2010. He was a member of the Committee on Culture, Recreation and Tourism and Vice-Chair of the Committee on Judiciary in 2008.

In the 1998 Democratic primary, Homer defeated B. D. Blount with 67% of the vote. Homer then defeated Sue Fancher in his first legislative race in November 1998, winning 57% of the vote. In the 2000 Democratic primary, Homer won 82% of the vote against Patricia Blount. He then ran unopposed in the 2000 and in the 2002 general Elections.

In the 2004 Democratic primary, he won 79% of the vote, defeating Richard Bradley Weemes. In that year's general election, he was re-elected by a margin of about 300 votes, defeating Republican Kirby Hollingsworth, carrying only two counties in District 3. In 2005, he expressed dissatisfaction with the House leadership during a special session for school funding. In 2006, Homer served on the Committee on Environmental Regulation, the Committee on Local and Consent Calendars, and the Committee on Licensing and Administrative Procedures. He chaired the Occupational Licensing Subcommittee. Republican State Senator Bill Ratliff, a former lieutenant governor, supported Homer's 2006 bid for re-election. On November 8, 2006, he won by a substantial margin against Hollingsworth, carrying five of the six counties in the district.

In 2008, he was again opposed by Hollingsworth in his bid for re-election. About a week before the election, Homer's campaign reported about $192,000 in contributions. He received support from such groups as teachers, realtors, small business owners, municipal employees, architects, and farmers.

Homer is married with three children. He received a degree in animal science from Texas A&M University in 1984 and an MBA from Angelo State University in 1988. He co-owns Sonic Drive-In franchises and has worked as a meat buyer for Safeway Supermarkets. He serves as a member of the Texas Legislative Tourism Caucus, as a member of the board of the Texas Conservative Coalition Research Institute, as vice chair of the Texas Conservative Coalition, and as director of the Texas Legislative Sportsman Caucus. In 2008, he received the Champion of Rural Health Care Award.
