= Brian McCall (politician) =

Chancellor of the Texas State University System

Brian McCall, Ph.D.
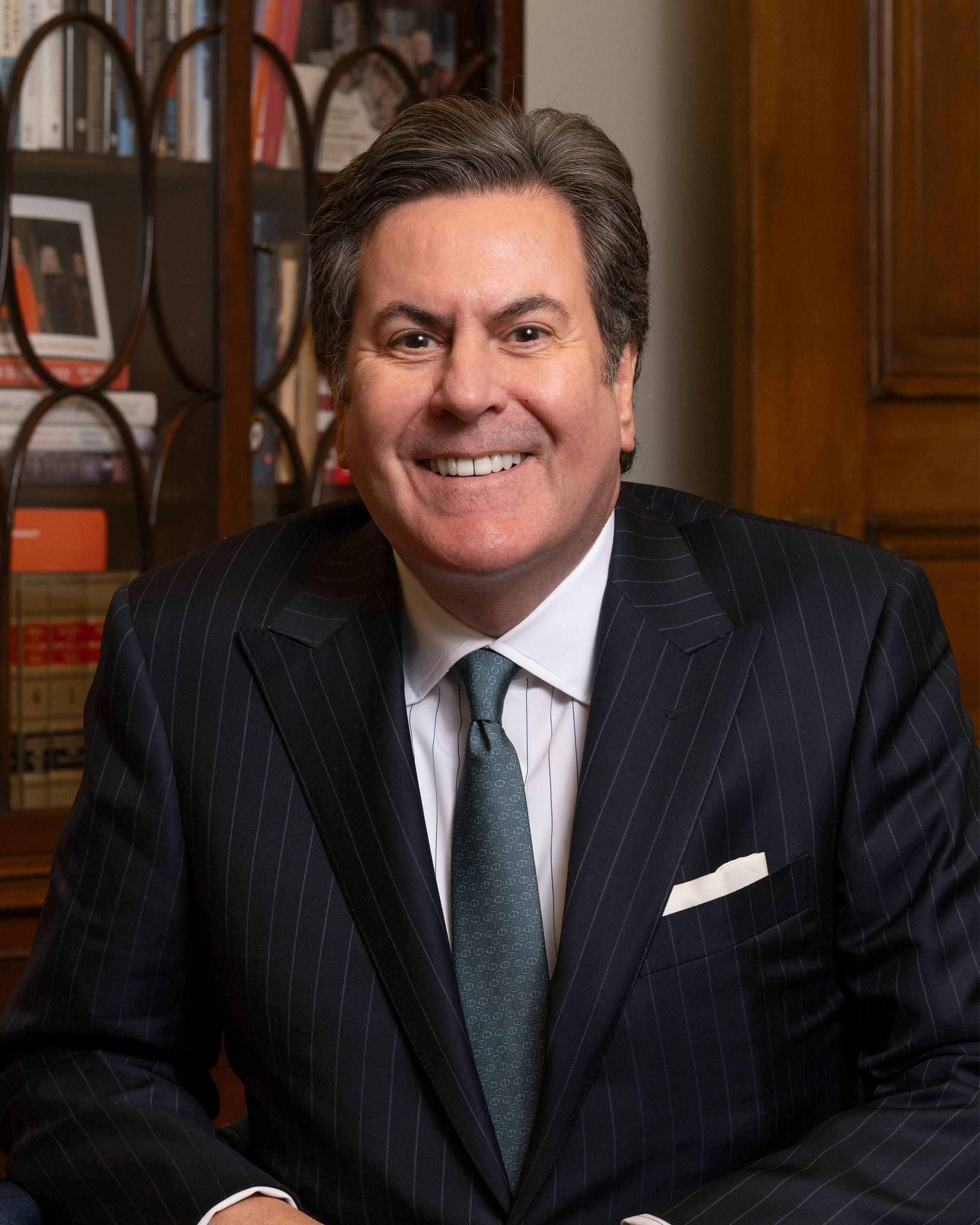
- McCall in 2023

Chancellor of the Texas State University System
- Incumbent
- Assumed office April 20, 2010
- Preceded by: Charles R. Matthews

Member of the Texas House of Representatives from the 66th district
- In office July 19, 1991 – April 2, 2010
- Preceded by: Robert Junell
- Succeeded by: Van Taylor

Personal details
- Born: James B. McCall; October 27, 1958 (age 67) Dallas, Texas, U.S.
- Education: Baylor University (BA); Southern Methodist University (Master of Arts), University of Texas at Dallas (Doctor of Philosophy)
- Website: Office of the Chancellor

Brian McCall, Ph.D. (born October 27, 1958) is the chancellor of the Texas State University System. He previously served as a member of the Texas House of Representatives from 1991 to 2010.

== Early life and education ==
McCall was raised in Plano, Texas. He earned a bachelor's degree from Baylor University, a master's degree from Southern Methodist University, and doctor of philosophy degree from University of Texas at Dallas. He also spent a year as a visiting post-graduate student at Oxford University. He is the author of The Power of the Texas Governor: Connally to Bush, published by University of Texas Press, which examines how various governors have overcome the institutional limitations of the office to achieve significant political power.

== Career ==
McCall was elected in 1991 to the first of 10 terms in the Texas House of Representatives and served as chairman of the House Calendars and Ways and Means committees, and as vice chairman of the Higher Education Committee. He was named chancellor of the Texas State University System in 2010.

McCall currently serves as chairman of the National Association of Higher Education Systems and has served as chairman of the Council of Public University Presidents and Chancellors.

McCall is the recipient of the 2012 Distinguished Alumni Award from the University of Texas at Dallas. He is a member of the Council on Foreign Relations and the Philosophical Society of Texas and is past president of the Board of Trustees of Zach Theatre in Austin.
