= Dwayne Bohac =

Lawmaker from Texas, United States

Member of the Texas House of Representatives from the 138th district
- In office January 14, 2003 – January 12, 2021
- Preceded by: Ken Yarbrough
- Succeeded by: Lacey Hull

Personal details
- Born: September 4, 1966 (age 60) Houston, Texas, U.S.
- Party: Republican
- Education: Texas A&M University (BS, BBA)

Dwayne Alan Bohac (born September 4, 1966) is an American businessman and politician who was a Republican member of the Texas House of Representatives from 2003 to 2021. He represented District 138, which encompasses west and northwest Houston. He was first elected in 2002, unseating Democratic Representative Ken Yarbrough in the general election, after having lost two previous elections to Yarbrough.

== Early life ==
Bohac was born in northwest Houston and attended Scarborough High School. After graduation, he went on to Houston Community College and Texas A&M University at College Station, at which he earned at Bachelor of Science degree in political science in 1989 and a Bachelor of Business Administration in marketing in 1990, graduating Cum Laude in both.

== Legislative career ==
Many of Bohac's legislative initiatives were oriented around law-enforcement and small business incentives. In April 2012, he was named "Best of the House" by the Combined Law Enforcement Association of Texas (CLEAT) and the "Taxpayers Best Friend" by the Texas House and was instrumental in the dedication of the Ronald Reagan Memorial Highway.

At the close of the 2012 season, Bohac introduced his "Merry Christmas Bill" in response to his son's school removing the word "Christmas" from all of its holiday activities.

Despite the Democratic sweep of Harris County in the general election held on November 6, 2018, Bohac secured his ninth term by 72 votes. With 24,194 votes (50.3 percent) he defeated Democrat Adam Milasincic, who polled 24,122 (49.9 percent). A write-in candidate held another 20 votes (0.04 percent).

On September 25, 2019, Bohac announced that he would not be running for reelection.

Texas House of Representatives
Preceded by Ken Yarbrough	Texas State Representative for District 138 (Harris County); 2003–2021	Succeeded by Lacey Hull
