= Joe Driver =

American politician (born 1946)

Texas State Representative for District 113
- In office 1993–2013
- Succeeded by: Cindy Burkett

Personal details
- Born: September 29, 1946 (age 80) Rockwall, Texas, USA
- Party: Republican
- Education: Garland High School; University of North Texas

Joe Driver (born September 29, 1946 in Rockwall, Texas) is a Republican politician from the U.S. state of Texas. From 1993 to 2013, he represented the 113th district in the Texas House of Representatives, a seat that he initially won in the 1992 elections.

He served on the House committees on (1) Appropriations and (2) Public Safety. He was a leading conservative in the legislature who sponsored bills to allow concealed carry on college campuses and generally favored lowering taxes over government expenditures.

On August 16, 2010, Driver admitted to billing the Texas House for certain expenses for which he had already been reimbursed by his own campaign fund. On December 19, 2011 Driver pleaded guilty to a third-degree felony of abuse in his official capacity as a state lawmaker as a consequence of the double-billing. He was fined $5,000 and given five years' probation. The maximum penalty for the crime is ten years in prison plus a $10,000 fine. Driver's plea bargain allowed him to keep his voting rights in the legislature, avoid being a convicted felon, and to collect his state retirement of $57,000 a year when he retired as a legislator in 2013.

He did not seek re-nomination in 2012, and the seat was handily won by the outgoing District 101 representative, Republican Cindy Burkett of Mesquite.
