= Redistricting in Texas =

Texas House of Representatives districts, Texas Senate districts, Texas Board of Education districts, and Texas's congressional districts are redistricted once every decade, usually in the year after the decennial United States census. According to the Texas Constitution, redistricting in Texas follows the regular legislative process; it must be passed by both houses of the Texas Legislature and signed by the governor of Texas—unless the legislature has sufficient votes to override a gubernatorial veto. Like many other states in the American South after the passage of the Voting Rights Act of 1965, federal judges and the United States Supreme Court have struck down Texas's congressional and legislative districts on multiple occasions, including in the 1960s, 1970s, 1980s, 1990s, and 2000s.

The most recent regularly-scheduled redistricting occurred in October 2021, when Republican governor Greg Abbott signed maps passed by the Republican-controlled legislature for the 2022–2031 decade. Many have criticized the maps that passed as racial and partisan gerrymanders designed to keep Republicans in power and reduce the voting power of minority communities. The state undertook mid-decade congressional redistricting in August 2025 at the direction of Republican President Donald Trump with the intention of further increasing Republicans' share of Texas's seats in the U.S. House.

== Background ==
Reapportionment of representatives between the states every ten years based on new census figures is required by Article I, Section 2 of the U.S. Constitution and Section 2 of the Fourteenth Amendment. The Constitution, Supreme Court jurisprudence, and federal law allow significant latitude to the individual states to draw their congressional and legislative districts as they see fit, as long as each district contains roughly equivalent numbers of people and provides for minority representation pursuant to the Voting Rights Act.

Article III of the Constitution of Texas mandates that redistricting must occur in the first legislative session following the publication of a new enumeration by the United States census. The House of Representatives must have 150 members and the Senate must have 31 members. Additionally, districts for the state House of Representatives must follow the "county line rule". Counties are allocated districts based on their population. Counties with sufficient population for exactly one district must be fully contained within that district. Counties with sufficient population for two or more districts must be divided into that number of districts. Should a county have sufficient population for one or more district plus a fraction of another, one district from another county may extend into it to represent the remaining population.

== Process ==
The redistricting process begins with each decennial census, when the U.S. government provides detailed census tract data to the states, usually by March 1 of the first year of the decade. The Texas Legislative Council provides this census data to legislators, who then draw district boundaries in a computer program using this information. Legislators then pass these boundaries into law as they would any other bill. Redistricting bills for each state legislative chamber typically originate in their respective chambers. If state legislative boundaries are not enacted by the legislature during the regular session, the Legislative Redistricting Board, consisting of the lieutenant governor, speaker of the House, attorney general, comptroller, and land commissioner, will pass its own plan, not subject to the governor's veto.

The legislature may alter the maps it passes later in the decade through mid-decade redistricting. This most often occurred in response to judicial action against the legislature's previously passed maps. More recently, the state's congressional maps have been altered mid-decade voluntarily to gain political advantage through gerrymandering. This took place in 2003 after Republicans took full control of the Texas Legislature, as well as in 2025 at the behest of Republican President Donald Trump.

=== Partisan control ===
All levers of Texas's redistricting process are fully controlled by the Republican Party, who hold a government trifecta as well as every office on the state's backup legislative redistricting board.

Standard redistricting controllers
Controlling body	Partisan control
Governor	Greg Abbott (R)
Senate	Republican
House of Representatives	Republican

Legislative Redistricting Board (Note: The LRB only has authority over state legislative maps; they take over the drawing process if the legislature and governor deadlock.)
State office	Board member
Lieutenant governor	Dan Patrick (R)
Speaker of the House	Dustin Burrows (R)
Attorney general	Ken Paxton (R)
Comptroller	Kelly Hancock (R)
Land commissioner	Dawn Buckingham (R)

== Timeline ==
=== Congressional districts ===
Year	Districts	Reason	Drawing body
1846	2	Statehood	Legislature
1850	2	Voluntary	Legislature
1861	6	Secession	Legislature
1866	4	Readmission	Legislature
1869	4	Reconstruction	Convention
1874	6	Census (Note: State used at-large districts during the delay between reapportionment and redistricting.)	Legislature
1879	6	Voluntary	Legislature
1882	11	Census	Legislature
1892	13	Census	Legislature
1901	16	Census	Legislature
1909	16	Voluntary	Legislature
1917	18	Census	Legislature
1933	21	Census	Legislature
1957	22	Census	Legislature
1965	23	Bush v. Martin	Legislature
1967	23	Voluntary	Legislature
1971	24	Census	Legislature
1973	24	White v. Weiser	Federal court
1975	24	Voluntary	Legislature
1981	27	Census	Federal court
1983	27	Voluntary	Legislature
1991	30	Census	Legislature
1996	30	Bush v. Vera	Federal court
2001	32	Census	Federal court
2003	32	Voluntary	Legislature
2006	32	LULAC v. Perry	Federal court
2012	36	Census	Legislature
2021	38	Census	Legislature
2025	38	Voluntary	Legislature

== History ==
=== Statehood ===
Texas's original state legislative districts were enacted by its 1845 Constitution. Immediately after convening for the first time, the Texas Legislature enacted its first set of congressional districts. The state was apportioned two districts until its secession in 1861. During this time period, the legislature also regularly revised its House and Senate districts. After its secession, the state sent six representatives to the Confederate States Congress. During Reconstruction, the 1869 Texas Constitution apportioned the state four seats in the United States House of Representatives. The state only had one set of legislative districts, with each district electing one senator and two to four representatives. Texas's current redistricting system was established by its 1876 Constitution.

=== 1876 Constitution ===
U.S. Congressional districts containing Colorado County (outlined in green) before and after the 1901 redistricting. The election results come from the 1896 presidential election.

The 1876 Constitution established the Texas Senate with 31 members. The Texas House of Representatives was given 93 members, but this number increased over the years until it reached its constitutional maximum of 150 in the 1920s. House districts at the time included single-member, multi-member, and floterial districts. The creation of new state House seats allowed for legislators to account for population growth in certain parts of the state while not endangering incumbents by altering districts elsewhere. Senate districts were single-member and independent of House districts, unlike under the 1869 Constitution. The Texas Constitution additionally limited counties to a maximum of one senator, which legislators used to maintain the status quo and protect incumbents for as long as they could. This strategy allowed for the passage of redistricting legislation at the beginning of every decade until the 1910s.

Following the end of Reconstruction, Texas's government was controlled entirely by the Democratic Party, giving them full control over the state's redistricting process. The legislature frequently failed to pass congressional redistricting legislation during the first session after a census, allowing the new seats to be elected at-large. This ensured that the new congressmen would always be chosen by the state's overwhelmingly White electorate, and it allowed the legislature to draw districts around the new incumbents for the next election cycle.

Following the 1880 census, the legislature adopted a redistricting plan giving the state 11 congressional districts. The state gained two seats following the 1890 census, but the legislature initially failed to draw new districts in 1891, raising the possibility of the new seats being elected at-large. The legislature later passed a map with 13 districts in 1892. Texas gained an additional three seats after the 1900 census. Controversy arose during the 1901 redistricting over the placement of then heavily African American Colorado County. Democratic legislators feared that, if left in the 10th district, the county's vote could overwhelm the rest of its district and elect a Republican to Congress. The bill that eventually passed moved Colorado County to the 9th district, and neither district elected a Republican to Congress in the following decade. The legislature later revised its 1901 redistricting plan in 1909.

=== Prohibition (1910s) ===
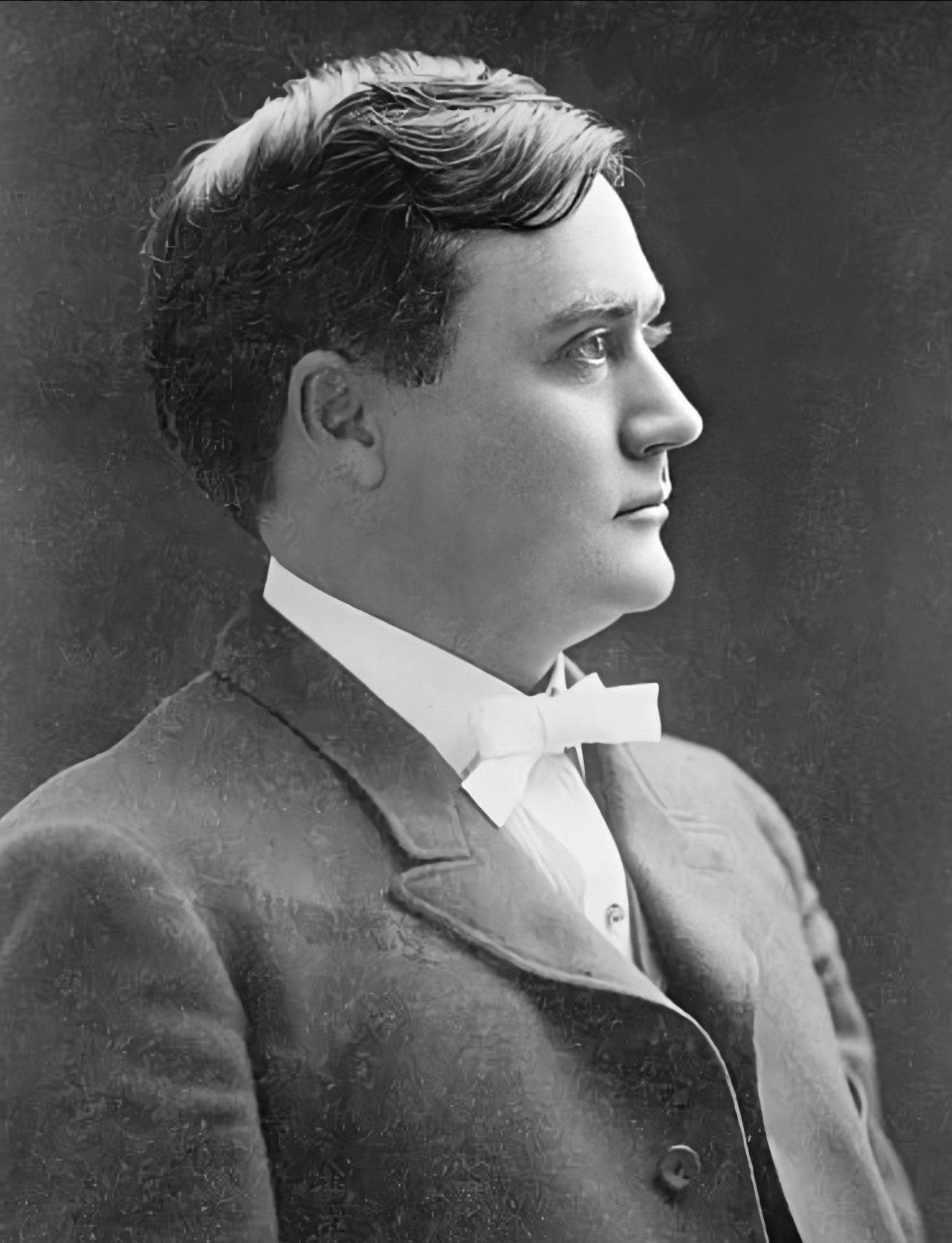
Oscar Branch Colquitt

Texas gained an additional two seats in Congress after the 1910 census. Legislators from West Texas sought redistricting to give greater representation to the growing region. Prohibitionist legislators similarly sought redistricting to increase their power in the state legislature. They held the majority of both chambers' redistricting committees, but governor Oscar Branch Colquitt threatened to veto any map that he saw as gerrymandered for either cause. During the regular session, representative Oscar Callaway spoke his opposition to the Senate's proposed congressional district map, as it drew him, as well as several other representatives, into districts with other incumbents. Despite the prohibitionists' apparent advantage, divisions within their caucus allowed the anti-prohibitionists to delay redistricting until a summer special session.

Governor Colquitt made redistricting one of his top priorities for the August special session. Prohibitionist senators filibustered the passage of the congressional redistricting bill, and after exhausting the filibuster, they left the chamber to deprive it of a quorum. The building was then locked down until enough Senators were forcibly returned to the chamber to allow the bill to advance. Because bills required readings on multiple separate legislative days, the prohibitionist Senators again fled the chamber to prevent final passage, although they temporarily returned for an unrelated vote. With the congressional redistricting bill appearing to head towards defeat, the anti-prohibitionist senators and three prohibitionist senators pushed governor Colquitt to call another special session.

Despite failing to redistrict the state's congressional districts, the legislature successfully passed bills to redistrict the state House and Senate. At the very end of the session, the Senate had overcome the prohibitionist filibuster to pass a congressional redistricting bill, but the effort stalled in the conference committee. Governor Colquitt signed the new state House map, but he vetoed the state Senate map, calling it "monstrously unjust". Colquitt refused to call another special session after the congressional redistricting bill died. Because of this, the state did not receive new districts, instead electing its two new congressman through at-large districts. The legislature failed to draw new congressional district boundaries until 1917. These new districts in the 1918 elections led to the defeat of then at-large congressman A. Jeff McLemore, who had drawn the ire of his own party for his opposition to World War I.

=== Failures to redistrict (1930s–50s) ===
Congress failed to pass reapportionment legislation after the 1920 census, leaving states with the same number of congressional districts as they had been apportioned under the 1910 census. It was only after the passage of the Reapportionment Act of 1929 that states were reapportioned congressional districts after the 1930 census. Texas gained three seats in the House of Representatives as a result, but it failed to pass redistricting legislation in 1931, despite the calling of several special sessions. As such, the new congressmen were elected at-large in the 1932 elections. Two of the three elected congressmen lived in Dallas, giving the city three congressmen in total, (Note: The third was Hatton W. Sumners of the 5th district, which was based in Dallas County.) vastly disproportionate to the rest of the state. The legislature attempted to redistrict the state during its 1933 session, but it faced considerable difficulties. The strongest disagreements came over attempts to dismantle the 7th district, which was represented by Clay Stone Briggs. These disagreements vanished, however, when Briggs died suddenly in April 1933. With the district now vacant, the legislature overwhelmingly approved the redistricting plan, including the dismantling of Briggs' old district. The new map did not place any non-at-large congressman in the same district as another, and it left an open seat in East Texas for at-large congressman George B. Terrell to run in. (Note: Terrell would not run in this district in 1934, however, as he had suffered a stroke earlier that year.) The map also gave Harris, Dallas, and Bexar counties individual congressmen, the first time any congressional district in Texas had been made up of only one county.

==== Division of Harris County ====
After 1933, Texas did not redraw its congressional districts until 1957. The state had gained one seat in the U.S. House after the 1950 census, but the legislature failed to pass a redistricting plan after a seventeen-hour filibuster by senator Searcy Bracewell. Bracewell had advocated for the new 22nd district to be added to Harris County due to its large population, but the plan the state Senate had agreed upon gave the district to South Texas instead. Due to the bill's defeat, the seat was added as an at-large district instead. The lack of redistricting drew the ire of many, especially Republicans. No county in the state had ever been a part of more than one congressional district, leading to large disparities between the populations of rural and urban districts. These disparities, and others like them across the country, were criticized by then-president Harry S. Truman as unrepresentative in 1951, and he called on Congress to pass a law tightening the standards for population equity in congressional districts.

By 1957, the 8th district, encompassing all of Harris County, was the largest congressional district in the country by population, with an estimated 1.2 million people living in it. The legislature finally created the 22nd district, made up of the southern half of Harris County, abolishing the state's at-large district. Efforts to similarly split Dallas County into multiple districts failed. Up to this point, it had been common practice for the legislature to not split counties when drawing congressional districts. The new 22nd district was more conservative than the old 8th district, giving Republicans a chance to pick up the seat in the 1958 elections. Republicans also saw the consolidation of the 12th district into Tarrant County as a chance for them to win that district as well. (Note: Representative Jim Wright, who lived in Parker County, moved to Tarrant County to continue running in the 12th district.) The legislature later failed to redistrict in 1961, reviving the state's at-large congressional district.

==== Legislative malapportionment ====
The legislature did not enact reapportionment bills for the state House or state Senate after the 1930 or 1940 census. In 1948, voters passed a constitutional amendment to create the Legislative Redistricting Board in the event that legislative redistricting failed following a census. Following this, the legislature successfully enacted redistricting plans after the 1950 and 1960 census. While debating state Senate redistricting bills in both 1951 and 1961, Senator Jep Fuller of Jefferson County filibustered the maps, objecting to the disproportionate distribution of voters among the districts. His own district in 1961 had double the population of the least populous district, and Senator Robert Baker, who supported him, represented Harris County with nine times the population of the least populous district. Both times, Fuller's filibuster failed. Attempts to get the Texas Supreme Court to overturn the maps also failed, as the Texas Constitution explicitly limited the number of state senators and representatives that urban counties could have.

=== Civil rights era (1960s) ===
Texas's 1958–1964 congressional districts by 1960 population. 939,845 618,352–682,481 511,982–567,801 418,132–494,413 319,728–360,562 213,374–292,663

On March 26, 1962, the Supreme Court of the United States held in Baker v. Carr that redistricting qualifies as a justiciable question under the equal protection clause of the Fourteenth Amendment, thus enabling federal courts to hear Fourteenth Amendment-based redistricting cases. In 1963, George H. W. Bush, as the head of the Harris County Republican Party, sued the state in Bush v. Martin. He argued that Texas's congressional districts violated the "one man, one vote" principle, which states that legislative districts should be apportioned equal population, and the courts ordered them to be redrawn. For example, by 1962, the 5th congressional district, encompassing all of Dallas County, had become the most populous congressional district in the country. It had over five times the population of the country's least populated congressional district at the time. Democratic governor John Connally refused to comply with the Houston court's order, and the state appealed to the Supreme Court. Texas lost its appeal, and the Court ordered the legislature to redraw its congressional districts. A lower trial court had previously ordered all of Texas's congressional seats to be filled at-large for the 1964 elections, but the Supreme Court allowed the state to ask for relief from this order. The lower court granted this request given Texas's upcoming primary elections, allowing the elections to be held under the old lines.

The Houston court gave the legislature the same threat of at-large elections in 1966 should it fail to pass constitutional maps beforehand. The legislature instructed the Texas Legislative Council to study redistricting to comply with court orders. The council created two possible maps, each providing the urban counties more equitable apportionment. The legislature modified these plans, especially the Harris County districts, enacting a map supported by State Representative Bob Eckhardt and George Bush which created districts for both men to run in. Additionally, the new maps split Midland and Ector Counties into separate districts as an apparent response to Republican Ed Foreman's victory in the 16th district in the 1962 elections. His victory had relied on the heavy Republican lean of both counties. The Texas Legislature enacted new congressional districts in May 1965. These districts were ruled constitutional, but the legislature revised a few districts in 1967 because the court had forced the plan to only be in effect for the 1966 elections.

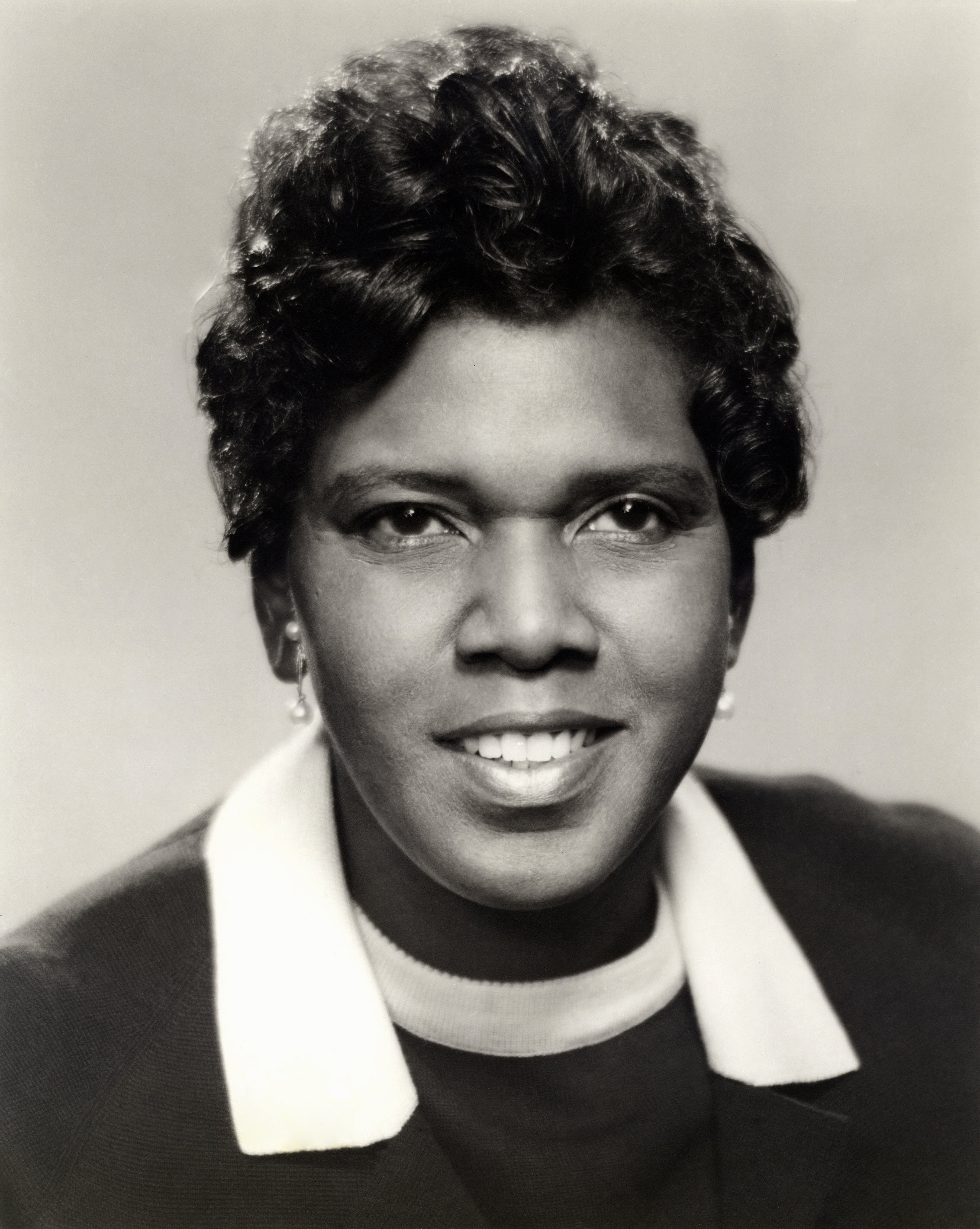
Barbara Jordan

==== Equal apportionment in the legislature ====
In 1964, the Supreme Court case Reynolds v. Sims applied the "one man, one vote" principle to state legislative districts. Governor Connally and the legislature opposed this, however, and supported the idea of passing a constitutional amendment to overturn Reynolds. Later, in 1965, a U.S. District Court ruled in Kilgarlin v. Martin that floterial districts, districts that overlap other districts, were unconstitutional and that the county-based apportionment of Senate districts created unconstitutional population disparities. For example, Harris County contained one state Senate district when its population should have given it four. The at-large nature of the district and Texas's runoff system meant that, despite Houston's large minority population, minorities would not be elected to the legislature from the district as Whites still made up a majority of its population. After the legislature enacted new districts in 1965 to comply with the ruling, Harris County gained three state senators and eleven state representatives. The new 11th Senate district, with an African American population of 48%, elected Barbara Jordan to the Texas Senate. She was the first African American senator since Reconstruction, and the first African American woman ever elected to the state Senate. The Supreme Court had allowed the state House's map, including its floterial districts, to be used for the 1966 elections, but it fully struck them down in 1967 due to its egregious population inequalities, forcing the legislature to redraw its map again without floterial districts.

=== Federal court intervention (1970s) ===
Barbara Jordan used her power in the Texas Senate to influence redistricting after the 1970 census. Houston had gained a fourth congressional district, the 18th, which Jordan ran in during the 1972 elections. At the same time, however, the legislature dismantled Jordan's Senate district, splitting its African American population between several other districts to make it easier for Democrats to win them. Federal courts once again challenged the proportionality of the districts in White v. Weiser, but the Supreme Court stayed the challenge until after the elections. A District Court had ruled the legislature's districts unconstitutional due to their average population deviation of 0.745%, which violated the "one man, one vote" principle established by Wesberry v. Sanders. The legislature argued that the deviations were necessary to protect incumbents, but the District Court did not approve of this explanation. This disapproval was not held upon appeal to the Supreme Court. The Supreme Court placed the lower court in charge of redrawing the map, which it did in time for the 1974 elections. After the 1974 elections, the legislature passed the court's districts into law, but they modified the boundaries of District 2 and District 6 to move the town of Streetman, which is on the border of Navarro County and Freestone County, fully within the boundaries of District 6.

==== Abolition of multi-member districts ====
The Texas Legislature passed maps for the state House of Representatives in 1971, but it did not pass state Senate maps, forcing the Legislative Redistricting Board to convene for the first time to draw the chamber's maps. The map for the state Senate passed the scrutiny of the courts, but the map for the state House did not. Republicans had sued the state over the state House's map, alleging that it violated the "county line rule". The Supreme Court of Texas in Smith v. Craddick agreed with the Republicans and struck down the map. Additionally, the Supreme Court in Mauzy v. Legislative Redistricting Board ordered the Legislative Redistricting Board to reapportion the state House because the legislature's map was struck down, constituting the "[failure] to make such apportionment" that calls the Board into action.

The legislature had voluntarily split Harris County into single-member state House districts in 1971, but eleven other counties still had multi-member districts. A Federal Court in Graves v. Barnes and White v. Regester then struck down the multi-member districts in Dallas County and Bexar County, calling them tools to diminish the voting power of minorities in those counties. Although the state opposed the notion that the multi-member districts discriminated against minorities, claiming that the districts were a means to make the redistricting process easier, the same district court in 1974 invalidated all of the state's multi-member districts in Graves v. Barnes. The legislature later drew a map composed solely of single-member state House districts to be used from the 1976 to the 1980 elections. In 1975, however, the Voting Rights Act of 1965 was amended to include Texas under its Section 5 preclearance requirement. The U.S. Department of Justice objected to the state's districts in Tarrant, Nueces, and Jefferson Counties, with the courts adopting their own interim plan for those counties for the rest of the decade. Disagreements over the districts in Tarrant County led to the adoption of an interim plan for the 1976 election before a final plan was agreed upon for use starting in the 1978 election.

=== Rising Republican power (1980s) ===
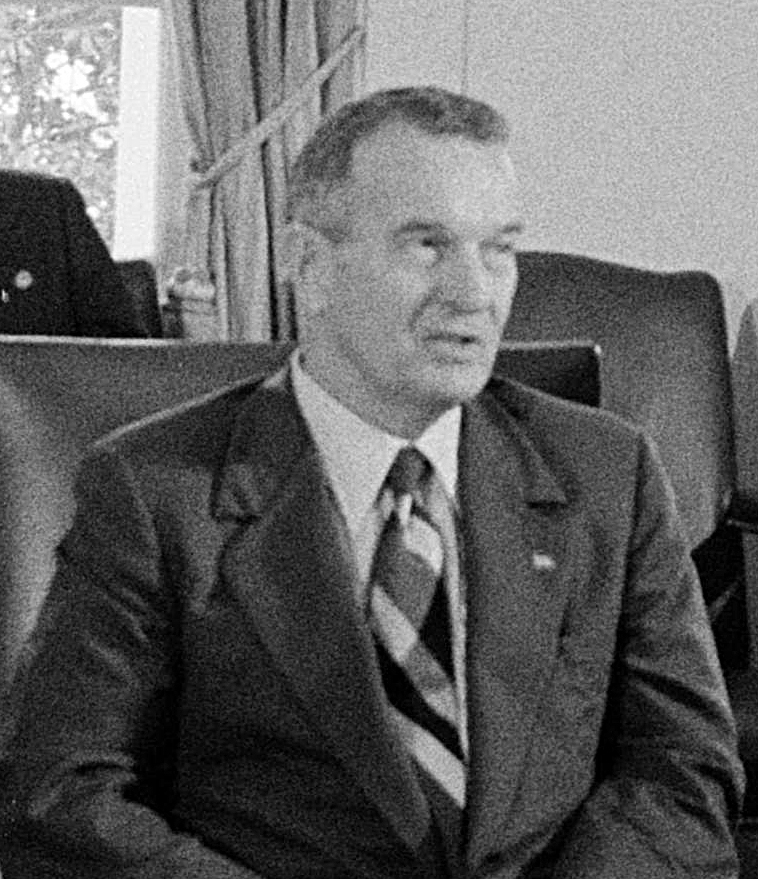
Bill Clements

In 1978, Republican Bill Clements was elected governor of Texas, ending Democrats' century-long hold of the office and their governmental trifecta. Republicans saw Clements' win as a vital tool to fight back against what they saw as Democratic gerrymandering in the state. This divided government caused many to foresee difficulty in the state's 1980 redistricting cycle, and the process attracted the attention of many prominent members of the U.S. House. The legislature failed to adopt new congressional districts during the regular legislative session in 1981 due to conflict between liberal and conservative Democrats. During a special session in 1981, conservative Democrats voted with Republicans on a plan supported by governor Clements. Most contentious during this session was the transfer of African-American voting precincts from District 5 to District 24 in the Dallas area. Though Republicans supported the establishment of the minority opportunity district, it was seen by many Democrats as a tactical political move to increase the Republican lean of the 5th District. The map that passed was intended to give Republicans three to four more seats in Texas's congressional delegation, as well as to give African Americans one more seat.

The adopted congressional districts were challenged under preclearance by the Justice Department in Upham v. Seamon, asserting that the boundaries of District 15 and District 27 were racially gerrymandered. The court ruled in favor of the Department of Justice, and it drew its own map, which established two districts in Dallas County where African-Americans made up a substantial proportion, but not a majority, of the voting-age population. The case was appealed to the Supreme Court, and it remanded the case back to the District Court, but the ruling was made so close to the May primary election that the District Court's maps were allowed to stand for the 1982 elections. Clements and other Republicans criticized the court's decision as judicial activism. The legislature modified other districts for the 1984 elections, keeping the court-modified districts in place.

The Texas Legislature passed legislative redistricting bills in 1981, but governor Clements vetoed the state Senate map, and the State Supreme Court struck down the state House map for violating the "county line rule". The Legislative Redistricting Board drew maps for both chambers, which were challenged by lawsuits in Terrazas v. Clements. Additionally, the Justice Department blocked both maps for violating the Voting Rights Act. Given the imminence of the March primary, the courts allowed the state Senate maps to be used for the 1982 elections, but it forced modifications to state House districts in Bexar County and El Paso County. In 1983, the legislature adopted the court's modified state House map into law. It also altered eight state Senate districts but avoided a full reapportionment, which would have necessitated re-electing all senators in 1984. The courts approved both plans.

=== Return to Democratic control (1990s) ===
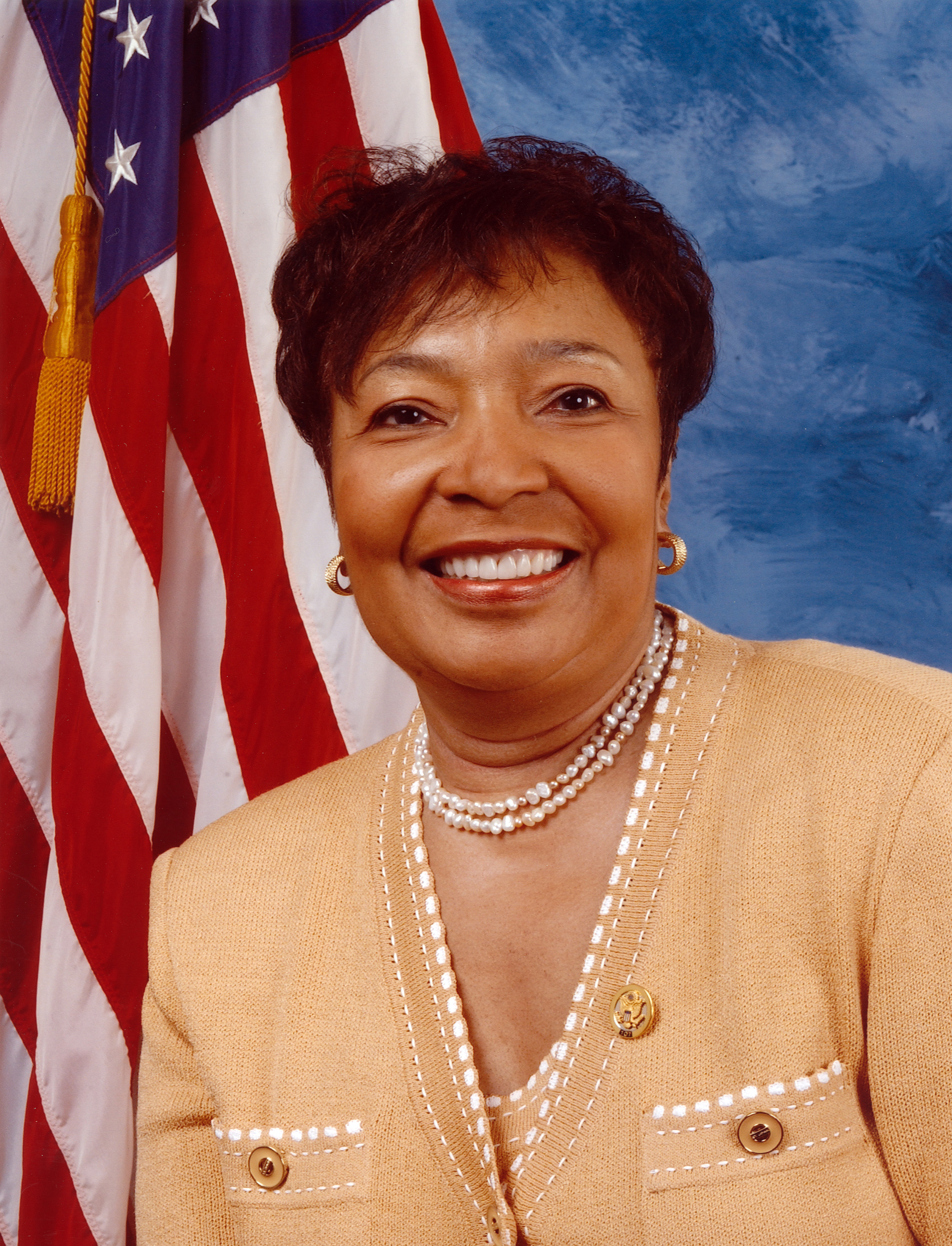
Eddie Bernice Johnson

In 1990, Democrat Ann Richards was elected governor of Texas, succeeding Bill Clements, who had won a second, non-consecutive term in 1986. Democratic State Senator Eddie Bernice Johnson chaired the redistricting subcommittee and drew maps with the intention of creating a minority-majority district in Dallas. This drew the ire of U.S. representatives Martin Frost and John Wiley Bryant, whose districts became considerably more White and Republican-leaning as a result. A majority-Hispanic district was also created in Houston alongside District 18, a majority-Black district. The Texas Legislature sided with Johnson's plan and adopted new congressional districts in 1991. Republicans criticized the maps for protecting Democratic incumbents, and others sued over the map's use of census data that may have undercounted minority populations. Despite this, the Justice Department granted the maps preclearance, and the maps were used in the 1992 elections.

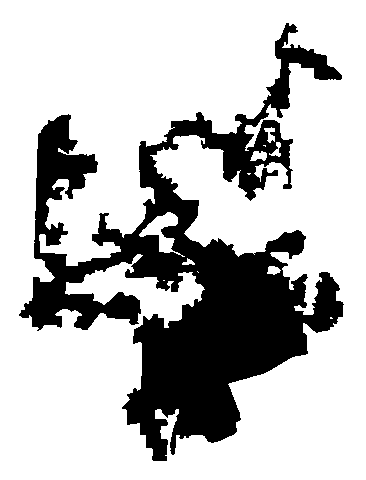
The boundaries of Texas's 30th congressional district during the 1992 and 1994 elections.

In early 1994, several Republicans sued the state alleging that District 18 and District 29 were racially gerrymandered. District 30 was later added to the case, and in August, a federal judicial panel ordered the state to redraw its congressional districts. A separate panel later allowed the struck districts to be used for the 1994 elections, but it ordered the state to redraw its districts before the 1996 elections. The state later appealed this decision, and it became the Supreme Court case Bush v. Vera. During the 1994 elections, Republicans won a majority of the statewide popular vote, but Democrats won the majority of Texas's congressional districts. Bush v. Vera ruled that districts such as District 18 and District 30 were racially gerrymandered. A prior district court decision had voided the results of the 1996 primary elections in 13 districts, which the Supreme Court upheld. These districts instead conducted special elections concurrent with the 1996 elections in the other districts. Despite never winning the statewide popular vote again, Democrats continued to hold their majority in Texas's congressional delegation throughout the decade.

==== Court-ordered legislative maps ====
Republicans similarly accused Democrats of gerrymandering the state's legislative maps. Unlike with the state's congressional maps, however, Republicans were successful, as courts completely overhauled the state Senate map and partially overhauled the state House map. Democrats attempted to pass a new map for the state Senate in January 1992 for the courts to approve, but they rejected this offer and imposed their own maps. For the state House, they simply codified the court's map into law. Republicans saw the new maps as their best opportunity to win control of the state Senate for the first time since Reconstruction. While Republicans did not win control in the 1992 elections, they won 13 of the 16 seats they would have needed to do so, a gain of four from the 1990 elections.

In 1994, the legislature ran for election under the seats passed during the January 1992 session. As the state Senate map was completely different from the 1992 map, all senators were required to run for re-election, instead of only half of them. The 1995 lawsuit Thomas v. Bush further altered the maps, as the courts reached a settlement with the legislature to alter some districts for the 1996 elections. These changes, plus a few minor ones, were passed into law and precleared for the 1998 and 2000 elections. Republicans won 15 state Senate seats during the 1996 general election, and their victory in a December runoff gave them control of the chamber for the first time in 124 years, splitting the Texas Legislature between the Republican-controlled Senate and the Democratic-controlled House.

=== Divided government (2001) ===
Democrats narrowly maintained control of the Texas House of Representatives after the 2000 elections, preventing complete Republican control over the redistricting process. During the 2001 regular session, the divided legislature failed to pass any redistricting plans. Congressional redistricting fell to the courts after no special session was called to address redistricting. While the court's initial map appeared to benefit Republicans, the final maps ordered for the 2002 elections allowed Democrats to maintain their majority in the state's congressional delegation.

Legislative redistricting fell to the Legislative Redistricting Board after Republican governor Rick Perry did not call a special session. Republicans controlled four of the five seats on the board, so Democrats tried to convince the Republican members of the Board to adopt a plan that would keep the partisan balance of the legislature intact. While Republican lieutenant governor Bill Ratliff was open to such a plan, the majority of the Board pushed for a plan that heavily favored Republicans. Challenges by the Mexican American Legal Defense and Educational Fund and the Department of Justice altered the board's state House districts, while keeping the state Senate map intact. The Board had attempted to draw Democratic Speaker Pete Laney out of his west Texas district, but this had the ripple effect of reducing the Hispanic population in District 74 along the Texas–Mexico border. The Board agreed to revert this change, allowing the map to pass preclearance.

State office	2001 board member
Lieutenant governor	Bill Ratliff (R) (Note: Ratliff opposed the maps supported by the other Republicans on the board.)
Speaker of the House	Pete Laney (D)
Attorney general	John Cornyn (R)
Comptroller	Carole Strayhorne (R)
Land commissioner	David Dewhurst (R)

While Democrats had maintained their advantage with the state's congressional districts, Republicans won control of the Texas House of Representatives and made major gains in the Texas Senate in 2002, giving them a governmental trifecta for the first time since Reconstruction.

=== Republicans gain control (2003) ===
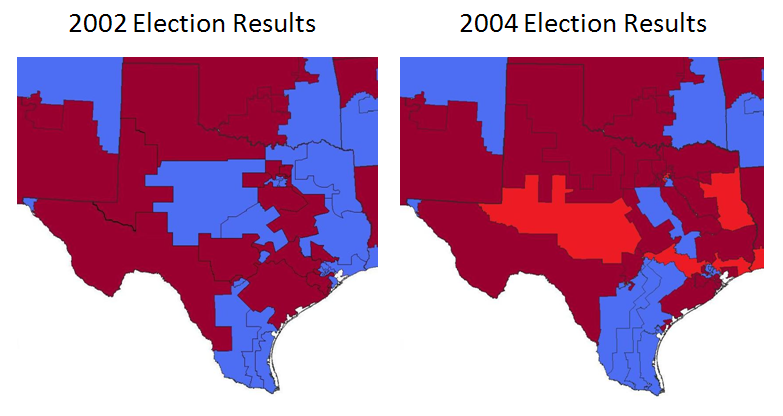
Comparison of U.S. House election results for Texas in 2002 and 2004 after the creation of new boundaries for congressional districts following mid-term redistricting in 2003. Blue denotes a Democratic hold, dark red denotes a Republican hold, and light red denotes a Republican gain.

After Republicans took full control of the Texas Legislature, they attempted to pass a mid-decade redistricting bill near the end of the 2003 regular session. In response, 58 Democratic members of the state House boycotted part of the session and left the capitol to deprive the body of a quorum, preventing the Republican-led chamber from functioning. House Speaker Tom Craddick ordered the arrest of the missing lawmakers. 53 of those members, later known as the "Killer D's," fled to a Holiday Inn in Ardmore, Oklahoma to continue depriving the House of a quorum, attracting the attention of national media, as well as Democrats in the U.S. House of Representatives, who praised their actions. The efforts later received support from the state's Hispanic chambers of commerce. After the regular session ended, Republican governor Rick Perry called a special session to address redistricting.

Changes in boundaries for Texas's congressional districts following the 2003 Texas redistricting Territory which was moved to a new district Districts which were entirely unchanged Districts which contained none of their prior territory

House Democrats were unable to stage another walkout during the first special session, but Senate Democrats were able to filibuster the bill until the end of the session, even garnering the support of Republican Senator Bill Ratliff. Knowing that Perry would immediately call a second special session after the end of the first, scheduling the session such that they could not filibuster the redistricting package, eleven Democratic members of the Texas Senate (the entire Democratic minority except for Ken Armbrister) chartered a plane and flew to Albuquerque, New Mexico prior to the beginning of the session to prevent a quorum. The "Texas Eleven," as they were called, received support from Democrats across the country, as some members moved to other states to continue their quorum-bust. Senate Republicans changed the chamber's rules to remove the quorum requirements, attempting to lure Democrats back to the state to fight the changes in court.

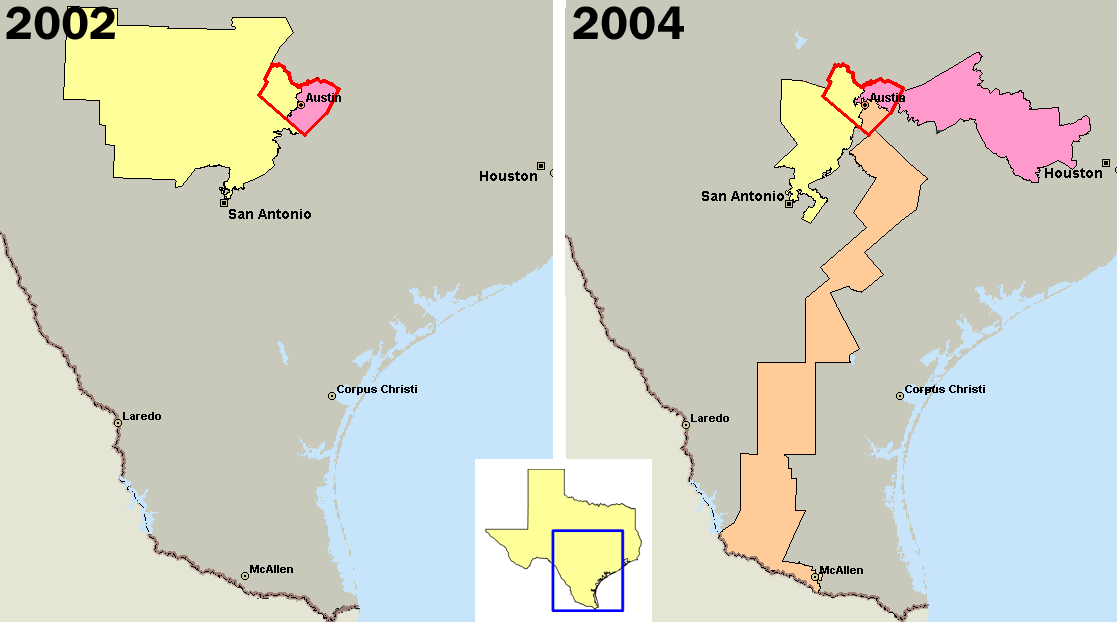
U.S. congressional districts covering Travis County, Texas (outlined in red) in 2002, left, and 2004, right.

Democrats were unable to block the redistricting package during a third special session, but they staged a symbolic walkout as the package neared passage to delay it over the weekend. After this brief delay, the state Senate passed the redistricting bill, ending the six-month-long redistricting process. The Justice Department granted the maps preclearance, but only after its professional staff's objections had been overruled by the department's political appointees. Federal courts allowed the maps to be used for the 2004 elections, but Democrats intended to appeal it to the Supreme Court. The map was ultimately successful for Republicans, as they won five Democratic-held seats, while a sixth Democrat, Ralph Hall, switched parties, giving Republicans a majority in Texas's congressional delegation for the first time since Reconstruction, and helping the party maintain their majority in the U.S. House of Representatives.

==== Supreme Court review (2006) ====
Democrats' challenge to the Republican's map made it all the way to the U.S. Supreme Court as League of United Latin American Citizens v. Perry. They argued that Republicans had used both racial and partisan gerrymandering when drawing the 23rd, 24th, and 25th districts. While the Court rejected the partisan gerrymandering claims, as well as racial gerrymandering claims in the 24th and 25th districts, they agreed that the 23rd district was gerrymandered against Hispanic voters. The courts redrew the district, as well as four other nearby districts; however, as the maps were not completed until after the primaries, the courts voided the results of the primaries, forcing all five districts to conduct special elections concurrent with the 2006 general election instead. The redrawn boundaries, as well as a low-turnout December runoff, allowed Democrat Ciro Rodriguez to unseat Republican Henry Bonilla in the 23rd district.

=== Republican dominance (2010s) ===
Although Democrats nearly won control of the Texas House in the 2008 elections, Republicans erased all of their gains in 2010, giving Republicans a very strong legislative advantage heading into the 2012 redistricting cycle. Texas gained four seats in the U.S. House of Representatives after the 2010 census, and Texans believed that Republicans would draw most of the state's new districts to favor themselves. The legislature did not complete its maps during the regular session, so governor Rick Perry called a special session. The legislature passed its map during the special session, which drew criticism from minority groups for ignoring their population growth over the past decade. The Department of Justice sued the state for racial discrimination, and a federal court re-drew the state's map, but the U.S. Supreme Court overturned this decision, holding that the court had not paid enough attention to the maps drawn by the legislature. The Supreme Court upheld the state's redistricting plan in 2018.

The Texas Legislature passed boundaries for itself in 2011, but the Justice Department denied them preclearance. A federal court in San Antonio implemented interim maps for the 2012 elections, which somewhat closely followed the legislature's initial maps. In 2013, the U.S. Supreme Court in Shelby County v. Holder ruled the preclearance requirement of the Voting Rights Act unconstitutional. This rendered the Justice Department's preclearance lawsuits moot, but the legislature had already adopted the San Antonio judge's redistricting maps into law in a 2013 special session, with minor changes to the state House's districts. The Supreme Court later upheld the entirety of Texas's maps in Abbott v. Perez with the exception of House District 90 in Tarrant County, which it ruled to be an unconstitutional racial gerrymander.

=== Present day (2020s) ===
In the 2018 elections, Democrats made major gains in the Texas House and Texas Senate, and they saw the 2020 elections as a chance to win control of the Texas House to give them power over the redistricting process in 2021. While Democrats came close to flipping several seats, they made no net gains in the 2020 elections, leaving Republicans with full control of the Texas Legislature for the 2020 redistricting cycle. Texas gained two seats in the U.S. House of Representatives as a result of the 2020 census. The maps Republicans proposed allowed Democrats to keep the two House seats they gained during the 2018 elections, the 7th and 32nd congressional districts, but they made every district that Republicans nearly lost in 2018 and 2020 significantly more Republican-leaning. Legislators drew the maps for the state during a special session in Fall 2021.

Many have criticized the maps that passed as racial and partisan gerrymanders designed to keep Republicans in power and reduce the voting power of minorities. News sources specifically noted that both of Texas's new congressional districts were majority White, despite voters of color making up 95% of the state's growth in the previous decade. Multiple groups, including the Justice Department, have sued the state over these maps. Additionally, the Mexican American Legislative Caucus argued in 2021 in MALC v. Abbott that part of the state House map violates the "county line rule".

==== 2025 redistricting ====
Texas congressional districts as redrawn by the Texas Legislature in a 2025 special session. Changes from the previous map highlighted. Territory which has moved to a new district Districts which were entirely unchanged

In June 2025, operatives of Republican President Donald Trump floated the idea of redistricting the state again prior to the 2026 midterm elections to blunt possible Democratic gains in other states and protect the party's narrow U.S. House majority. Some Republicans have said that as many as five Democratic incumbents could be targeted, but others were more apprehensive, worrying about overstretching Republican leaning areas, which could lead to Democrats making gains instead. In July, governor Greg Abbott officially added redistricting to the agenda of an upcoming special session that began in July 2025. In response to this, Texas Democrats in the Texas House of Representatives staged a walk out on August 3, 2025. However, the new maps were eventually passed by the state legislature and were signed into law by governor Abbott on August 29, 2025.

== Possibilities for reform ==
Many have called for the establishment of an independent redistricting commission for the state of Texas. Adopting stricter redistricting criteria, such as expanding the "county line rule" to apply to state Senate and congressional districts, could also make it more difficult to gerrymander the state. In the past, most of the state's redistricting reforms have come from the federal level, such as through court mandates of equal population among districts or through the Voting Rights Act. More recently, however, federal legislation to ban partisan gerrymandering has failed to pass, and the Supreme Court has refused to overturn the state's maps. At the state level, the legislature is seen as unlikely to give up its own redistricting power, and Texas has no citizen-led ballot initiative process to bypass it.

== See also ==
- Elections in Texas
- Political party strength in Texas
- 2020 United States Census
- 2020 United States redistricting cycle
- 2025 Texas Redisricting
- 2025 Texas House Democratic quorum break

== Bibliography ==
- Galderisi, Peter F. Redistricting in the New Millennium (2005): 275–311.
- Bickerstaff, Steve. Lines in the Sand: Congressional Redistricting in Texas and the Downfall of Tom Delay (2007).
- Keith, Gary A. Rotten Boroughs, Political Thickets, and Legislative Donnybrooks: Redistricting in Texas (2013).
- Bickerstaff, Steve. Heath, C. Robert (ed.). Gerrymandering Texas (2020).
