= 1998 Texas House of Representatives election =

- November 3, 1998

All 150 seats in the Texas House of Representatives 76 seats needed for a majority
	Majority party	Minority party
Leader	Pete Laney	Tom Craddick
Party	Democratic	Republican
Leader since	January 12, 1993	January 9, 1973
Leader's seat	85th	82nd
Last election	82	68
Seats won	78	72
Seat change	▼4	▲4
Popular vote	1,289,275	1,827,843
Percentage	41.29%	58.54%
Swing	▼2.89%	▲3.70%
- Democratic hold Republican hold Republican gain Democratic: 50–60% 60–70% 70–80% ≥90% Republican: 50–60% 60–70% 70–80% 80–90% ≥90%
Speaker before election
Pete Laney
Democratic
Elected Speaker
Pete Laney
Democratic

The 1998 Texas House of Representatives elections took place as part of the biennial United States elections. Texas voters elected state representatives in all 150 State House of Representatives districts. The winners of this election served in the 76th Texas Legislature. State representatives serve for two-year terms. Republicans gained four seats from the Democrats, reducing the Democratic majority to 78 out of 150 seats.

== Background ==
Democrats had held control of the Texas House of Representatives since Reconstruction despite Republicans winning the governorship in 1994 and the Texas Senate in 1996. Democrats faced difficulties from the top of the ticket due to the popular Republican governor George W. Bush running for reelection. Republicans sought to use Bush's coattails to gain several seats in the Texas House, increasing their chances of winning control of the chamber in 2000 ahead of the redistricting that would occur the following year.

== Redistricting ==
Democrats had fully controlled the redistricting process in 1991, and Republicans sued over the Texas House's map. The courts partially overhauled the map as a result of these lawsuits. Democrats codified the court's map into law in a January 1992 special session. The 1995 lawsuit Thomas v. Bush further altered the maps, as the courts reached a settlement with the legislature to alter some districts for the 1996 elections. These changes, plus minor alterations to districts in Williamson County and Jefferson County, were passed into law for the 1998 election.

== Results ==
Republicans flipped four seats from the Democrats, failing to take control of the chamber but further narrowing the Democratic majority.

=== Statewide ===
Summary of the November 3, 1998 Texas House of Representatives election results
Party	Candidates	Votes	%	Seats	+/–
Democratic Party	97	1,289,275	41.29%	78	▼4
Republican Party	105	1,827,843	58.54%	72	▲4
Libertarian Party	3	4,473	0.14%	0	–
Write-in	1	575	0.02%	0	–
Total		3,122,166	100.00%	150	–

Popular vote
Republican	58.54%
Democratic	41.29%
Libertarian	0.14%
Write-in	0.02%

House seats won
Democratic	52.00%
Republican	48.00%

=== Close races ===
1. District 46, 0.12% (gain)
2. District 68, 0.88% (gain)
3. District 138, 0.92%
4. District 13, 2.00% (gain)
5. District 18, 2.66%
6. District 73, 3.56% (tipping-point district)
7. District 30, 5.48%
8. District 44, 5.58%
9. District 21, 6.28%
10. District 4, 6.62% (gain)
11. District 70, 7.50%
12. District 59, 8.92%
13. District 54, 9.56%
14. District 2, 9.88%

=== Results by district ===
District	Democratic		Republican		Others		Total		Result
District	Votes	%	Votes	%	Votes	%	Votes	%	Result
District 1	18,237	100.00%	-	-	-	-	18,237	100.00%	Democratic hold
District 2	17,096	54.94%	14,023	45.06%	-	-	31,119	100.00%	Democratic hold
District 3	15,813	56.98%	11,937	43.02%	-	-	27,750	100.00%	Democratic hold
District 4	13,010	46.69%	14,853	53.31%	-	-	27,863	100.00%	Republican gain
District 5	15,015	56.17%	11,716	43.83%	-	-	26,731	100.00%	Democratic hold
District 6	-	-	23,744	100.00%	-	-	23,744	100.00%	Republican hold
District 7	-	-	18,395	100.00%	-	-	18,395	100.00%	Republican hold
District 8	17,496	61.56%	10,926	38.44%	-	-	28,422	100.00%	Democratic hold
District 9	12,135	42.16%	16,646	57.84%	-	-	28,781	100.00%	Republican hold
District 10	-	-	20,162	100.00%	-	-	20,162	100.00%	Republican hold
District 11	-	-	18,863	100.00%	-	-	18,863	100.00%	Republican hold
District 12	18,497	62.75%	10,979	37.25%	-	-	29,476	100.00%	Democratic hold
District 13	15,406	49.00%	16,034	51.00%	-	-	31,440	100.00%	Republican gain
District 14	-	-	16,721	100.00%	-	-	16,721	100.00%	Republican hold
District 15	11,163	30.40%	25,558	69.60%	-	-	36,721	100.00%	Republican hold
District 16	-	-	21,513	97.40%	575	2.60%	22,088	100.00%	Republican hold
District 17	18,771	63.61%	10,737	36.39%	-	-	29,508	100.00%	Democratic hold
District 18	15,304	51.33%	14,511	48.67%	-	-	29,815	100.00%	Democratic hold
District 19	21,860	100.00%	-	-	-	-	21,860	100.00%	Democratic hold
District 20	16,579	56.05%	13,000	43.95%	-	-	29,579	100.00%	Democratic hold
District 21	18,252	53.14%	16,096	46.86%	-	-	34,348	100.00%	Democratic hold
District 22	20,229	100.00%	-	-	-	-	20,229	100.00%	Democratic hold
District 23	14,452	55.98%	11,364	44.02%	-	-	25,816	100.00%	Democratic hold
District 24	16,558	58.34%	11,823	41.66%	-	-	28,381	100.00%	Democratic hold
District 25	-	-	23,882	100.00%	-	-	23,882	100.00%	Republican hold
District 26	-	-	29,495	100.00%	-	-	29,495	100.00%	Republican hold
District 27	15,001	100.00%	-	-	-	-	15,001	100.00%	Democratic hold
District 28	20,890	64.62%	11,439	35.38%	-	-	32,329	100.00%	Democratic hold
District 29	14,886	65.30%	7,910	34.70%	-	-	22,796	100.00%	Democratic hold
District 30	14,494	47.26%	16,176	52.74%	-	-	30,670	100.00%	Republican hold
District 31	19,989	100.00%	-	-	-	-	19,989	100.00%	Democratic hold
District 32	-	-	23,318	100.00%	-	-	23,318	100.00%	Republican hold
District 33	15,044	70.27%	6,364	29.73%	-	-	21,408	100.00%	Democratic hold
District 34	14,014	67.37%	6,787	32.63%	-	-	20,801	100.00%	Democratic hold
District 35	15,971	100.00%	-	-	-	-	15,971	100.00%	Democratic hold
District 36	8,781	100.00%	-	-	-	-	8,781	100.00%	Democratic hold
District 37	8,390	100.00%	-	-	-	-	8,390	100.00%	Democratic hold
District 38	9,872	100.00%	-	-	-	-	9,872	100.00%	Democratic hold
District 39	6,719	100.00%	-	-	-	-	6,719	100.00%	Democratic hold
District 40	7,659	100.00%	-	-	-	-	7,659	100.00%	Democratic hold
District 41	8,951	100.00%	-	-	-	-	8,951	100.00%	Democratic hold
District 42	12,402	100.00%	-	-	-	-	12,402	100.00%	Democratic hold
District 43	17,622	100.00%	-	-	-	-	17,622	100.00%	Democratic hold
District 44	13,596	52.79%	12,157	47.21%	-	-	25,753	100.00%	Democratic hold
District 45	-	-	27,994	100.00%	-	-	27,994	100.00%	Republican hold
District 46	15,039	49.94%	15,075	50.06%	-	-	30,114	100.00%	Republican gain
District 47	-	-	46,745	100.00%	-	-	46,745	100.00%	Republican hold
District 48	24,257	100.00%	-	-	-	-	24,257	100.00%	Democratic hold
District 49	19,074	63.25%	11,082	36.75%	-	-	30,156	100.00%	Democratic hold
District 50	18,726	100.00%	-	-	-	-	18,726	100.00%	Democratic hold
District 51	13,584	73.42%	4,919	26.58%	-	-	18,503	100.00%	Democratic hold
District 52	-	-	33,465	100.00%	-	-	33,465	100.00%	Republican hold
District 53	-	-	37,257	100.00%	-	-	37,257	100.00%	Republican hold
District 54	9,866	45.22%	11,954	54.78%	-	-	21,820	100.00%	Republican hold
District 55	-	-	14,916	100.00%	-	-	14,916	100.00%	Republican hold
District 56	8,618	30.78%	19,384	69.22%	-	-	28,002	100.00%	Republican hold
District 57	15,073	100.00%	-	-	-	-	15,073	100.00%	Democratic hold
District 58	11,585	40.60%	16,948	59.40%	-	-	28,533	100.00%	Republican hold
District 59	11,651	54.46%	9,741	45.54%	-	-	21,392	100.00%	Democratic hold
District 60	-	-	23,348	100.00%	-	-	23,348	100.00%	Republican hold
District 61	11,626	35.42%	21,200	64.58%	-	-	32,826	100.00%	Republican hold
District 62	9,454	33.86%	18,469	66.14%	-	-	27,923	100.00%	Republican hold
District 63	8,716	25.64%	25,276	74.36%	-	-	33,992	100.00%	Republican hold
District 64	-	-	23,726	100.00%	-	-	23,726	100.00%	Republican hold
District 65	-	-	17,625	100.00%	-	-	17,625	100.00%	Republican hold
District 66	-	-	31,432	100.00%	-	-	31,432	100.00%	Republican hold
District 67	-	-	26,521	100.00%	-	-	26,521	100.00%	Republican hold
District 68	14,597	49.56%	14,854	50.44%	-	-	29,451	100.00%	Republican gain
District 69	14,207	56.07%	11,130	43.93%	-	-	25,337	100.00%	Democratic hold
District 70	14,188	53.75%	12,208	46.25%	-	-	26,396	100.00%	Democratic hold
District 71	-	-	22,138	100.00%	-	-	22,138	100.00%	Republican hold
District 72	19,975	73.60%	7,165	26.40%	-	-	27,140	100.00%	Democratic hold
District 73	18,438	51.78%	17,170	48.22%	-	-	35,608	100.00%	Democratic hold
District 74	16,293	100.00%	-	-	-	-	16,293	100.00%	Democratic hold
District 75	11,822	73.24%	4,320	26.76%	-	-	16,142	100.00%	Democratic hold
District 76	15,586	100.00%	-	-	-	-	15,586	100.00%	Democratic hold
District 77	11,573	100.00%	-	-	-	-	11,573	100.00%	Democratic hold
District 78	9,480	35.22%	17,436	64.78%	-	-	26,916	100.00%	Republican hold
District 79	13,263	100.00%	-	-	-	-	13,263	100.00%	Democratic hold
District 80	-	-	16,249	100.00%	-	-	16,249	100.00%	Republican hold
District 81	-	-	15,420	100.00%	-	-	15,420	100.00%	Republican hold
District 82	-	-	22,086	100.00%	-	-	22,086	100.00%	Republican hold
District 83	-	-	13,053	100.00%	-	-	13,053	100.00%	Republican hold
District 84	-	-	26,189	100.00%	-	-	26,189	100.00%	Republican hold
District 85	17,751	73.47%	6,410	26.53%	-	-	24,161	100.00%	Democratic hold
District 86	-	-	25,887	100.00%	-	-	25,887	100.00%	Republican hold
District 87	-	-	15,848	100.00%	-	-	15,848	100.00%	Republican hold
District 88	-	-	22,852	100.00%	-	-	22,852	100.00%	Republican hold
District 89	8,066	37.61%	13,378	62.39%	-	-	21,444	100.00%	Republican hold
District 90	8,990	100.00%	-	-	-	-	8,990	100.00%	Democratic hold
District 91	-	-	19,142	100.00%	-	-	19,142	100.00%	Republican hold
District 92	-	-	19,515	100.00%	-	-	19,515	100.00%	Republican hold
District 93	-	-	13,054	100.00%	-	-	13,054	100.00%	Republican hold
District 94	-	-	22,580	100.00%	-	-	22,580	100.00%	Republican hold
District 95	18,742	100.00%	-	-	-	-	18,742	100.00%	Democratic hold
District 96	-	-	21,515	100.00%	-	-	21,515	100.00%	Republican hold
District 97	-	-	27,590	100.00%	-	-	27,590	100.00%	Republican hold
District 98	7,362	23.54%	23,910	76.46%	-	-	31,272	100.00%	Republican hold
District 99	-	-	20,644	100.00%	-	-	20,644	100.00%	Republican hold
District 100	11,592	100.00%	-	-	-	-	11,592	100.00%	Democratic hold
District 101	-	-	15,007	100.00%	-	-	15,007	100.00%	Republican hold
District 102	-	-	19,117	100.00%	-	-	19,117	100.00%	Republican hold
District 103	7,898	100.00%	-	-	-	-	7,898	100.00%	Democratic hold
District 104	5,682	70.62%	2,364	29.38%	-	-	8,046	100.00%	Democratic hold
District 105	8,794	100.00%	-	-	-	-	8,794	100.00%	Democratic hold
District 106	6,804	36.04%	12,076	63.96%	-	-	18,880	100.00%	Republican hold
District 107	10,152	59.26%	6,980	40.74%	-	-	17,132	100.00%	Democratic hold
District 108	-	-	27,220	100.00%	-	-	27,220	100.00%	Republican hold
District 109	14,667	100.00%	-	-	-	-	14,667	100.00%	Democratic hold
District 110	17,790	100.00%	-	-	-	-	17,790	100.00%	Democratic hold
District 111	16,215	100.00%	-	-	-	-	16,215	100.00%	Democratic hold
District 112	-	-	18,748	100.00%	-	-	18,748	100.00%	Republican hold
District 113	-	-	16,911	100.00%	-	-	16,911	100.00%	Republican hold
District 114	-	-	20,782	100.00%	-	-	20,782	100.00%	Republican hold
District 115	10,943	100.00%	-	-	-	-	10,943	100.00%	Democratic hold
District 116	11,378	100.00%	-	-	-	-	11,378	100.00%	Democratic hold
District 117	8,219	100.00%	-	-	-	-	8,219	100.00%	Democratic hold
District 118	9,878	100.00%	-	-	-	-	9,878	100.00%	Democratic hold
District 119	12,104	100.00%	-	-	-	-	12,104	100.00%	Democratic hold
District 120	11,945	100.00%	-	-	-	-	11,945	100.00%	Democratic hold
District 121	-	-	22,974	100.00%	-	-	22,974	100.00%	Republican hold
District 122	-	-	28,763	100.00%	-	-	28,763	100.00%	Republican hold
District 123	-	-	26,380	100.00%	-	-	26,380	100.00%	Republican hold
District 124	12,472	100.00%	-	-	-	-	12,472	100.00%	Democratic hold
District 125	11,440	100.00%	-	-	-	-	11,440	100.00%	Democratic hold
District 126	-	-	25,914	100.00%	-	-	25,914	100.00%	Republican hold
District 127	-	-	21,427	100.00%	-	-	21,427	100.00%	Republican hold
District 128	9,135	62.61%	5,455	37.39%	-	-	14,590	100.00%	Democratic hold
District 129	7,863	27.64%	20,086	70.62%	494	1.74%	28,443	100.00%	Republican hold
District 130	-	-	26,059	100.00%	-	-	26,059	100.00%	Republican hold
District 131	16,183	100.00%	-	-	-	-	16,183	100.00%	Democratic hold
District 132	18,559	100.00%	-	-	-	-	18,559	100.00%	Democratic hold
District 133	-	-	23,734	100.00%	-	-	23,734	100.00%	Republican hold
District 134	8,906	39.70%	13,527	60.30%	-	-	22,433	100.00%	Republican hold
District 135	-	-	21,151	100.00%	-	-	21,151	100.00%	Republican hold
District 136	-	-	26,678	92.06%	2,301	7.94%	28,979	100.00%	Republican hold
District 137	11,359	63.07%	6,650	36.93%	-	-	18,009	100.00%	Democratic hold
District 138	10,274	50.46%	10,088	49.54%	-	-	20,362	100.00%	Democratic hold
District 139	12,068	100.00%	-	-	-	-	12,068	100.00%	Democratic hold
District 140	6,547	100.00%	-	-	-	-	6,547	100.00%	Democratic hold
District 141	15,462	100.00%	-	-	-	-	15,462	100.00%	Democratic hold
District 142	14,183	100.00%	-	-	-	-	14,183	100.00%	Democratic hold
District 143	7,506	72.24%	2,884	27.76%	-	-	10,390	100.00%	Democratic hold
District 144	-	-	12,265	87.97%	1,678	12.03%	13,943	100.00%	Republican hold
District 145	6,405	67.12%	3,137	32.88%	-	-	9,542	100.00%	Democratic hold
District 146	17,374	75.95%	5,501	24.05%	-	-	22,875	100.00%	Democratic hold
District 147	13,081	100.00%	-	-	-	-	13,081	100.00%	Democratic hold
District 148	8,641	100.00%	-	-	-	-	8,641	100.00%	Democratic hold
District 149	-	-	10,384	100.00%	-	-	10,384	100.00%	Republican hold
District 150	-	-	19,632	100.00%	-	-	19,632	100.00%	Republican hold
Total	1,289,275	41.29%	1,827,843	58.54%	4,473	0.16%	3,122,166	100.00%	
