= 2008 Texas House of Representatives election =

- November 4, 2008

All 150 seats in the Texas House of Representatives 76 seats needed for a majority
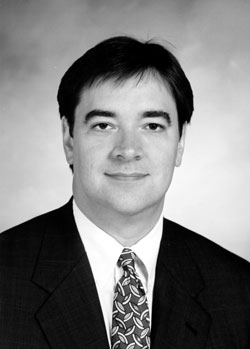
| | Majority party | Minority party |
|---|---|---|
| | Rep |
| Leader | Tom Craddick (removed as leader) | Jim Dunnam |
| Party | Republican | Democratic |
| Leader since | January 9, 1973 | January 14, 2003 |
| Leader's seat | 82nd | 57th |
| Last election | 81 | 69 |
| Seats before | 79 | 71 |
| Seats won | 76 | 74 |
| Seat change | ▼3 | ▲3 |
| Popular vote | 3,828,577 | 2,965,717 |
| Percentage | 53.99% | 41.82% |
| Swing | ▲0.47% | ▲1.31% |
- Republican hold Democratic hold Republican gain Democratic gain Republican: 40–50% 50–60% 60–70% 70–80% 80–90% ≥90% Democratic: 40–50% 50–60% 60–70% 70–80% 80–90% ≥90%
Speaker before election
Tom Craddick
Republican
Elected Speaker
Joe Straus
Republican

The 2008 Texas House of Representatives elections took place as part of the biennial United States elections. Texas voters elected state representatives in all 150 State House of Representatives districts. The winners of this election served in the 81st Texas Legislature. State representatives serve for two-year terms. Republicans maintained control of the House, losing three seats to the Democrats.

== Background ==
Following the 2002 elections, the Republicans gained control of the House, giving them a governmental trifecta for the first time since Reconstruction. Democrats made significant gains in the 2006 elections, and they gained two more seats following them, one due to a special election, and another due to the defection of Republican Kirk England to the Democratic Party. Democrats needed to gain five seats from the Republicans to win control of the chamber.

== Predictions ==
| Source | Ranking | As of |
|---|---|---|
| Stateline | Lean R | Oct. 15, 2008 |

== Results ==
Democrats gained a net of three seats from the Republicans, failing to take control of the chamber, but leaving Republicans with a very narrow majority. Control of the chamber remained unclear for multiple days after the election due to a recount in District 105. Incumbent Republican Linda Harper-Brown led her Democratic challenger Bob Romano by 20 votes after election day counting concluded. The recount only reduced Harper-Brown's lead by one vote, confirming her victory in the seat and Republicans' control of the chamber. Had Romano won, the chamber would have been tied.

=== Statewide ===
Summary of the November 4, 2008 Texas House of Representatives election results
| Party | Candi- dates | Votes | % | Seats | +/– |
|---|---|---|---|---|---|
| Republican Party | 97 | 3,828,577 | 53.99% | 76 | ▼3 |
| Democratic Party | 111 | 2,965,717 | 41.82% | 74 | ▲3 |
| Libertarian Party | 84 | 319,020 | 4.50% | 0 | – |
| Total | | 7,090,830 | 100.00% | 150 | – |

Popular vote
| Republican | 53.99% |
| Democratic | 41.82% |
| Libertarian | 4.50% |

House seats won
| Republican | 50.67% |
| Democratic | 49.33% |

=== Close races ===
1. District 105, 0.04%
2. District 11, 0.20%
3. District 101, 1.12% (gain)
4. District 52, 1.19% (gain)
5. District 133, 1.24% (gain)
6. District 144, 2.30% (tipping-point district)
7. District 47, 2.40%
8. District 32, 3.33% (gain)
9. District 107, 3.50%
10. District 3, 3.68%
11. District 96, 4.73% (gain)
12. District 102, 6.02% (gain)
13. District 34, 6.28%
14. District 78, 6.42% (gain)
15. District 85, 6.76%
16. District 1, 8.59%

=== Notable races ===
2008 Texas' 85th state house district results by county: Map Legend: Heflin—70–80%; Heflin—60–70%; Heflin—50–60%; Castro—50–60%

District 85: District 85, located in West Texas near Lubbock, had been held by Democrat Pete Laney for decades, but his retirement in 2006 left the seat highly vulnerable for a Republican pickup as the area had swung rapidly towards the Republicans since the 1990s. In fact, no Democrat had won any of the counties contained within the district in a presidential election since 1996. Despite this swing, Democrat Joe Heflin managed to win the open seat with 49.01% of the vote in 2006. The seat was again vulnerable in 2008, but Heflin managed to win re-election with 53.38%, strongly outperforming Democratic presidential candidate Barack Obama, who only won 27.33% of the district's vote in the concurrent presidential election. Heflin performed best in Crosby County, his home county.

Texas's 85th state house district election
| Party | Candidate | Votes | % |
|---|---|---|---|
| Democratic | Joe Heflin | 22,865 | 53.38% |
| Republican | Issac M. Castro | 19,970 | 46.62% |
| Total votes | | 42,835 | 100.00% |
| Democratic hold | | | |

District 97: A special election was held on November 6, 2007, to fill the unexpired term of Rep. Anna Mowery. Dan Barret, who had lost the seat to Mowery in 2006, ran against 6 Republicans in the jungle primary, securing a plurality of 31.53% of the vote. A runoff was held on December 18, 2007, between Barret and second-place finisher, Mark M. Shelton in which Barret won an upset victory with 52.19% of the vote. As the legislative session had already ended, Barret did not spend any time legislating during his term. He was later defeated by Shelton in the 2008 general election, only securing 42.75% of the vote.

Texas's 97th state house district special election
| Party | Candidate | Votes | % |
|---|---|---|---|
| Democratic | Dan Barrett | 5,575 | 31.53% |
| Republican | Mark M. Shelton | 4,049 | 22.90% |
| Republican | Bob Leonard | 3,294 | 18.63% |
| Republican | Craig Goldman | 2,947 | 16.67% |
| Republican | Jeff Humber | 925 | 5.23% |
| Republican | Chris Hatch | 515 | 2.91% |
| Republican | James Dean Schull | 375 | 2.12% |
| Total votes | | 17,680 | 100.00% |

Texas's 97th state house district special election runoff
| Party | Candidate | Votes | % |
|---|---|---|---|
| Democratic | Dan Barrett | 5,365 | 52.19% |
| Republican | Mark M. Shelton | 4,915 | 47.81% |
| Total votes | | 10,280 | 100.00% |
| Democratic gain from Republican | | Swing | 19.49% |

District 106: Representative Kirk England was re-elected in 2006 as a Republican with 49.16% of the vote. On September 20, 2007, he announced that he would switch parties and seek re-election as a Democrat. He would later go on to win re-election in 2008 with 55.49% of the vote before losing re-election by 204 votes in 2010 to Republican Rodney Anderson.

Texas's 106th state house district election
| Party | Candidate | Votes | % |
|---|---|---|---|
| Democratic | Kirk England | 21,484 | 55.49% |
| Republican | Karen Wiegman | 16,362 | 42.26% |
| Libertarian | Gene Freeman | 869 | 2.24% |
| Total votes | | 38,715 | 100.00% |
| Democratic hold | | | |

=== Results by district ===
| District | Democratic | | Republican | | Libertarian | | Total | | Result |
| District | Votes | % | Votes | % | Votes | % | Votes | % | Result |
|---|---|---|---|---|---|---|---|---|---|
| District 1 | 29,598 | 53.59% | 24,853 | 45.00% | 781 | 1.41% | 55,232 | 100.00% | Democratic hold |
| District 2 | - | - | 39,258 | 85.04% | 6,906 | 14.96% | 46,164 | 100.00% | Republican hold |
| District 3 | 26,763 | 51.84% | 24,864 | 48.16% | - | - | 51,627 | 100.00% | Democratic hold |
| District 4 | 22,049 | 35.18% | 39,250 | 62.62% | 1,383 | 2.21% | 62,682 | 100.00% | Republican hold |
| District 5 | - | - | 47,309 | 100.00% | - | - | 47,309 | 100.00% | Republican hold |
| District 6 | - | - | 44,476 | 87.77% | 6,196 | 12.23% | 50,672 | 100.00% | Republican hold |
| District 7 | - | - | 40,671 | 88.34% | 5,368 | 11.66% | 46,039 | 100.00% | Republican hold |
| District 8 | - | - | 34,524 | 100.00% | - | - | 34,524 | 100.00% | Republican hold |
| District 9 | 18,448 | 35.40% | 32,704 | 62.76% | 961 | 1.84% | 52,113 | 100.00% | Republican hold |
| District 10 | - | - | 49,401 | 85.52% | 8,366 | 14.48% | 57,767 | 100.00% | Republican hold |
| District 11 | 26,054 | 49.29% | 25,934 | 49.06% | 875 | 1.66% | 52,863 | 100.00% | Democratic hold |
| District 12 | 28,760 | 57.06% | 21,647 | 42.94% | - | - | 50,407 | 100.00% | Democratic hold |
| District 13 | - | - | 41,376 | 100.00% | - | - | 41,376 | 100.00% | Republican hold |
| District 14 | - | - | 37,236 | 82.20% | 8,063 | 17.80% | 45,299 | 100.00% | Republican hold |
| District 15 | - | - | 69,661 | 100.00% | - | - | 69,661 | 100.00% | Republican hold |
| District 16 | - | - | 49,263 | 100.00% | - | - | 49,263 | 100.00% | Republican hold |
| District 17 | 25,583 | 42.85% | 32,238 | 53.99% | 1,889 | 3.16% | 59,710 | 100.00% | Republican gain |
| District 18 | 14,901 | 31.46% | 32,465 | 68.54% | - | - | 47,366 | 100.00% | Republican hold |
| District 19 | 17,306 | 33.99% | 32,545 | 63.92% | 1,064 | 2.09% | 50,915 | 100.00% | Republican hold |
| District 20 | 26,907 | 30.53% | 57,029 | 64.71% | 4,199 | 4.76% | 88,135 | 100.00% | Republican hold |
| District 21 | 32,208 | 100.00% | - | - | - | - | 32,208 | 100.00% | Democratic hold |
| District 22 | 31,169 | 94.46% | - | - | 1,827 | 5.54% | 32,996 | 100.00% | Democratic hold |
| District 23 | 31,195 | 86.80% | - | - | 4,743 | 13.20% | 35,938 | 100.00% | Democratic hold |
| District 24 | - | - | 47,378 | 86.31% | 7,515 | 13.69% | 54,893 | 100.00% | Republican hold |
| District 25 | - | - | 33,404 | 85.96% | 5,454 | 14.04% | 38,858 | 100.00% | Republican hold |
| District 26 | - | - | 45,679 | 100.00% | - | - | 45,679 | 100.00% | Republican hold |
| District 27 | 48,415 | 65.56% | 25,434 | 34.44% | - | - | 73,849 | 100.00% | Democratic hold |
| District 28 | 32,089 | 38.02% | 50,824 | 60.22% | 1,484 | 1.76% | 84,397 | 100.00% | Republican hold |
| District 29 | 26,433 | 39.53% | 40,439 | 60.47% | - | - | 66,872 | 100.00% | Republican hold |
| District 30 | - | - | 38,869 | 100.00% | - | - | 38,869 | 100.00% | Republican hold |
| District 31 | 24,170 | 100.00% | - | - | - | - | 24,170 | 100.00% | Democratic hold |
| District 32 | 25,994 | 46.80% | 27,844 | 50.13% | 1,705 | 3.07% | 55,543 | 100.00% | Republican gain |
| District 33 | 24,582 | 59.04% | 14,792 | 35.53% | 2,261 | 5.43% | 41,635 | 100.00% | Democratic hold |
| District 34 | 21,188 | 53.14% | 18,684 | 46.86% | - | - | 39,872 | 100.00% | Democratic hold |
| District 35 | 29,458 | 100.00% | - | - | - | - | 29,458 | 100.00% | Democratic hold |
| District 36 | 24,598 | 100.00% | - | - | - | - | 24,598 | 100.00% | Democratic hold |
| District 37 | 19,695 | 100.00% | - | - | - | - | 19,695 | 100.00% | Democratic hold |
| District 38 | 25,476 | 100.00% | - | - | - | - | 25,476 | 100.00% | Democratic hold |
| District 39 | 23,879 | 100.00% | - | - | - | - | 23,879 | 100.00% | Democratic hold |
| District 40 | 24,103 | 100.00% | - | - | - | - | 24,103 | 100.00% | Democratic hold |
| District 41 | 23,438 | 64.86% | 12,025 | 33.28% | 671 | 1.86% | 36,134 | 100.00% | Democratic hold |
| District 42 | 31,129 | 100.00% | - | - | - | - | 31,129 | 100.00% | Democratic hold |
| District 43 | 25,771 | 87.20% | - | - | 3,782 | 12.80% | 29,553 | 100.00% | Democratic hold |
| District 44 | - | - | 46,686 | 82.42% | 9,959 | 17.58% | 56,645 | 100.00% | Republican hold |
| District 45 | 43,926 | 59.31% | 27,729 | 37.44% | 2,411 | 3.26% | 74,066 | 100.00% | Democratic hold |
| District 46 | 34,353 | 86.52% | - | - | 5,351 | 13.48% | 39,704 | 100.00% | Democratic hold |
| District 47 | 45,314 | 51.20% | 43,190 | 48.80% | - | - | 88,504 | 100.00% | Democratic hold |
| District 48 | 39,748 | 53.75% | 31,028 | 41.96% | 3,174 | 4.29% | 73,950 | 100.00% | Democratic hold |
| District 49 | 54,284 | 100.00% | - | - | - | - | 54,284 | 100.00% | Democratic hold |
| District 50 | 45,456 | 62.97% | 23,681 | 32.80% | 3,055 | 4.23% | 72,192 | 100.00% | Democratic hold |
| District 51 | 29,384 | 89.52% | - | - | 3,440 | 10.48% | 32,824 | 100.00% | Democratic hold |
| District 52 | 34,898 | 48.61% | 34,047 | 47.42% | 2,854 | 3.97% | 71,799 | 100.00% | Democratic gain |
| District 53 | - | - | 47,847 | 88.89% | 5,983 | 11.11% | 53,830 | 100.00% | Republican hold |
| District 54 | - | - | 33,690 | 78.04% | 9,478 | 21.96% | 43,168 | 100.00% | Republican hold |
| District 55 | 24,290 | 43.38% | 30,189 | 53.92% | 1,509 | 2.70% | 55,988 | 100.00% | Republican hold |
| District 56 | - | - | 44,067 | 86.38% | 6,946 | 13.62% | 51,013 | 100.00% | Republican hold |
| District 57 | 28,291 | 87.83% | - | - | 3,920 | 12.17% | 32,211 | 100.00% | Democratic hold |
| District 58 | 14,749 | 26.21% | 39,697 | 70.55% | 1,825 | 3.24% | 56,271 | 100.00% | Republican hold |
| District 59 | 16,546 | 35.81% | 28,482 | 61.64% | 1,178 | 2.55% | 46,206 | 100.00% | Republican hold |
| District 60 | 13,195 | 23.24% | 43,588 | 76.76% | - | - | 56,783 | 100.00% | Republican hold |
| District 61 | 16,308 | 24.20% | 48,879 | 72.53% | 2,205 | 3.27% | 67,392 | 100.00% | Republican hold |
| District 62 | 17,365 | 31.60% | 37,588 | 68.40% | - | - | 54,953 | 100.00% | Republican hold |
| District 63 | 19,883 | 22.66% | 64,048 | 72.98% | 3,831 | 4.37% | 87,762 | 100.00% | Republican hold |
| District 64 | 28,195 | 39.40% | 40,758 | 56.95% | 2,613 | 3.65% | 71,566 | 100.00% | Republican hold |
| District 65 | - | - | 47,471 | 79.67% | 12,114 | 20.33% | 59,585 | 100.00% | Republican hold |
| District 66 | - | - | 45,421 | 85.00% | 8,015 | 15.00% | 53,436 | 100.00% | Republican hold |
| District 67 | - | - | 30,558 | 78.46% | 8,390 | 21.54% | 38,948 | 100.00% | Republican hold |
| District 68 | - | - | 41,543 | 100.00% | - | - | 41,543 | 100.00% | Republican hold |
| District 69 | 31,925 | 86.19% | - | - | 5,114 | 13.81% | 37,039 | 100.00% | Democratic hold |
| District 70 | - | - | 73,450 | 86.21% | 11,751 | 13.79% | 85,201 | 100.00% | Republican hold |
| District 71 | - | - | 40,381 | 88.31% | 5,346 | 11.69% | 45,727 | 100.00% | Republican hold |
| District 72 | - | - | 37,010 | 86.94% | 5,560 | 13.60% | 42,570 | 100.00% | Republican hold |
| District 73 | 21,732 | 25.97% | 58,118 | 69.44% | 3,846 | 4.60% | 83,696 | 100.00% | Republican hold |
| District 74 | 26,235 | 64.19% | 14,633 | 35.81% | - | - | 40,868 | 100.00% | Democratic hold |
| District 75 | 26,806 | 71.36% | 10,758 | 28.64% | - | - | 37,564 | 100.00% | Democratic hold |
| District 76 | 26,632 | 100.00% | - | - | - | - | 26,632 | 100.00% | Democratic hold |
| District 77 | 21,444 | 100.00% | - | - | - | - | 21,444 | 100.00% | Democratic hold |
| District 78 | 26,176 | 51.53% | 22,918 | 45.11% | 1,706 | 3.36% | 50,800 | 100.00% | Democratic gain |
| District 79 | 27,604 | 100.00% | - | - | - | - | 27,604 | 100.00% | Democratic hold |
| District 80 | 30,676 | 100.00% | - | - | - | - | 30,676 | 100.00% | Democratic hold |
| District 81 | - | - | 32,973 | 90.15% | 3,603 | 9.85% | 36,576 | 100.00% | Republican hold |
| District 82 | 18,870 | 35.31% | 33,202 | 62.12% | 1,372 | 2.57% | 53,444 | 100.00% | Republican hold |
| District 83 | - | - | 53,411 | 100.00% | - | - | 53,411 | 100.00% | Republican hold |
| District 84 | - | - | 32,949 | 100.00% | - | - | 32,949 | 100.00% | Republican hold |
| District 85 | 22,865 | 53.38% | 19,970 | 46.62% | - | - | 42,835 | 100.00% | Democratic hold |
| District 86 | 10,917 | 18.27% | 47,031 | 78.69% | 1,820 | 3.05% | 59,768 | 100.00% | Republican hold |
| District 87 | - | - | 28,546 | 84.80% | 5,115 | 15.20% | 33,661 | 100.00% | Republican hold |
| District 88 | - | - | 41,053 | 100.00% | - | - | 41,053 | 100.00% | Republican hold |
| District 89 | - | - | 69,628 | 100.00% | - | - | 69,628 | 100.00% | Republican hold |
| District 90 | 16,984 | 70.29% | 7,180 | 29.71% | - | - | 24,164 | 100.00% | Democratic hold |
| District 91 | 19,567 | 35.91% | 33,383 | 61.27% | 1,535 | 2.82% | 54,485 | 100.00% | Republican hold |
| District 92 | 21,038 | 36.28% | 36,955 | 63.72% | - | - | 57,993 | 100.00% | Republican hold |
| District 93 | 27,538 | 57.21% | 19,582 | 40.68% | 1,011 | 2.10% | 48,131 | 100.00% | Democratic hold |
| District 94 | - | - | 39,915 | 84.81% | 7,147 | 15.19% | 47,602 | 100.00% | Republican hold |
| District 95 | 39,150 | 95.52% | - | - | 1,838 | 4.48% | 40,988 | 100.00% | Democratic hold |
| District 96 | 41,977 | 51.30% | 38,108 | 46.57% | 1,737 | 2.12% | 81,822 | 100.00% | Democratic gain |
| District 97 | 29,206 | 42.75% | 37,800 | 55.33% | 1,306 | 1.91% | 68,312 | 100.00% | Republican gain |
| District 98 | 25,855 | 26.64% | 68,345 | 70.43% | 2,845 | 2.93% | 97,045 | 100.00% | Republican hold |
| District 99 | 23,135 | 32.41% | 46,254 | 64.80% | 1,993 | 2.79% | 71,382 | 100.00% | Republican hold |
| District 100 | 27,903 | 93.44% | - | - | 1,958 | 6.56% | 29,861 | 100.00% | Democratic hold |
| District 101 | 23,713 | 50.56% | 23,192 | 49.44% | - | - | 46,905 | 100.00% | Democratic gain |
| District 102 | 21,675 | 53.01% | 19,210 | 46.99% | - | - | 40,885 | 100.00% | Democratic gain |
| District 103 | 14,825 | 88.31% | - | - | 1,963 | 11.69% | 16,788 | 100.00% | Democratic hold |
| District 104 | 16,655 | 100.00% | - | - | - | - | 16,655 | 100.00% | Democratic hold |
| District 105 | 19,838 | 48.68% | 19,857 | 48.72% | 1,061 | 2.60% | 40,756 | 100.00% | Republican hold |
| District 106 | 21,484 | 55.49% | 16,362 | 42.26% | 869 | 2.24% | 38,715 | 100.00% | Democratic hold |
| District 107 | 25,374 | 50.45% | 23,616 | 46.95% | 1,309 | 2.60% | 50,299 | 100.00% | Democratic hold |
| District 108 | 21,737 | 39.39% | 33,442 | 60.61% | - | - | 55,179 | 100.00% | Republican hold |
| District 109 | 59,472 | 94.15% | - | - | 3,692 | 5.85% | 63,164 | 100.00% | Democratic hold |
| District 110 | 30,869 | 100.00% | - | - | - | - | 30,869 | 100.00% | Democratic hold |
| District 111 | 43,685 | 79.05% | 10,685 | 19.32% | 901 | 1.63% | 55,260 | 100.00% | Democratic hold |
| District 112 | 21,919 | 39.64% | 30,998 | 56.07% | 2,372 | 4.29% | 55,289 | 100.00% | Republican hold |
| District 113 | 21,232 | 41.49% | 29,938 | 58.51% | - | - | 51,170 | 100.00% | Republican hold |
| District 114 | - | - | 31,393 | 100.00% | - | - | 31,393 | 100.00% | Republican hold |
| District 115 | - | - | 35,635 | 81.18% | 8,262 | 18.82% | 43,897 | 100.00% | Republican hold |
| District 116 | 27,540 | 85.53% | - | - | 4,661 | 14.47% | 32,201 | 100.00% | Democratic hold |
| District 117 | 28,675 | 57.03% | 21,607 | 42.97% | - | - | 50,282 | 100.00% | Democratic hold |
| District 118 | 24,169 | 59.93% | 14,747 | 36.57% | 1,414 | 3.51% | 40,330 | 100.00% | Democratic hold |
| District 119 | 29,867 | 100.00% | - | - | - | - | 29,867 | 100.00% | Democratic hold |
| District 120 | 32,601 | 100.00% | - | - | - | - | 32,601 | 100.00% | Democratic hold |
| District 121 | - | - | 44,471 | 79.62% | 11,380 | 20.38% | 55,852 | 100.00% | Republican hold |
| District 122 | 30,953 | 29.90% | 68,371 | 66.04% | 4,212 | 4.07% | 103,536 | 100.00% | Republican hold |
| District 123 | 27,040 | 100.00% | - | - | - | - | 27,040 | 100.00% | Democratic hold |
| District 124 | 36,557 | 100.00% | - | - | - | - | 36,557 | 100.00% | Democratic hold |
| District 125 | 36,003 | 100.00% | - | - | - | - | 36,003 | 100.00% | Democratic hold |
| District 126 | 21,179 | 38.42% | 32,748 | 59.40% | 1,204 | 2.18% | 55,131 | 100.00% | Republican hold |
| District 127 | 21,987 | 32.29% | 44,698 | 65.65% | 1,402 | 2.06% | 68,087 | 100.00% | Republican hold |
| District 128 | - | - | 28,439 | 100.00% | - | - | 28,439 | 100.00% | Republican hold |
| District 129 | 23,722 | 41.48% | 33,462 | 58.52% | - | - | 57,184 | 100.00% | Republican hold |
| District 130 | - | - | 63,945 | 87.62% | 9,301 | 12.38% | 72,976 | 100.00% | Republican hold |
| District 131 | 35,026 | 100.00% | - | - | - | - | 35,026 | 100.00% | Democratic hold |
| District 132 | - | - | 43,817 | 82.44% | 9,334 | 17.56% | 53,151 | 100.00% | Republican hold |
| District 133 | 20,219 | 50.62% | 19,722 | 49.38% | - | - | 39,941 | 100.00% | Democratic gain |
| District 134 | 37,892 | 55.46% | 28,843 | 42.22% | 1,585 | 2.32% | 68,320 | 100.00% | Democratic hold |
| District 135 | 18,733 | 39.95% | 27,382 | 58.39% | 778 | 1.66% | 46,893 | 100.00% | Republican hold |
| District 136 | - | - | 41,117 | 87.10% | 6,087 | 12.90% | 47,204 | 100.00% | Republican hold |
| District 137 | 12,233 | 89.25% | - | - | 1,473 | 10.75% | 13,706 | 100.00% | Democratic hold |
| District 138 | 15,052 | 40.99% | 21,666 | 59.01% | - | - | 36,718 | 100.00% | Republican hold |
| District 139 | 35,220 | 100.00% | - | - | - | - | 35,220 | 100.00% | Democratic hold |
| District 140 | 13,348 | 100.00% | - | - | - | - | 13,348 | 100.00% | Democratic hold |
| District 141 | 32,747 | 87.72% | 8,197 | 19.70% | 656 | 1.58% | 41,600 | 100.00% | Democratic hold |
| District 142 | 35,159 | 100.00% | - | - | - | - | 35,159 | 100.00% | Democratic hold |
| District 143 | 11,881 | 70.69% | 4,647 | 27.65% | 278 | 1.65% | 16,806 | 100.00% | Democratic hold |
| District 144 | 19,078 | 48.85% | 19,980 | 51.15% | - | - | 39,058 | 100.00% | Republican hold |
| District 145 | 16,946 | 70.35% | 5,877 | 29.65% | - | - | 19.823 | 100.00% | Democratic hold |
| District 146 | 41,669 | 100.00% | - | - | - | - | 41,669 | 100.00% | Democratic hold |
| District 147 | 35,951 | 92.23% | - | - | 3,030 | 7.77% | 38,981 | 100.00% | Democratic hold |
| District 148 | 21,535 | 66.24% | 10,975 | 33.76% | - | - | 32,510 | 100.00% | Democratic hold |
| District 149 | 25,562 | 56.34% | 19,806 | 43.66% | - | - | 45,371 | 100.00% | Democratic hold |
| District 150 | 22,916 | 33.53% | 43,916 | 64.35% | 1,449 | 2.12% | 68,337 | 100.00% | Republican hold |
| Total | 2,965,717 | 41.82% | 3,828,577 | 53.99% | 319,020 | 4.50% | 7,090,830 | 100.00% | |
