= 2000 Texas House of Representatives election =

- November 7, 2000

All 150 seats in the Texas House of Representatives 76 seats needed for a majority
	Majority party	Minority party
Leader	Pete Laney	Tom Craddick
Party	Democratic	Republican
Leader since	January 12, 1993	January 9, 1973
Leader's seat	85th	82nd
Last election	78	72
Seats won	78	72
Seat change	Steady	Steady
Popular vote	2,129,633	2,943,035
Percentage	41.03%	56.70%
Swing	▼0.26%	▼1.84%
- Democratic hold Democratic gain Republican hold Republican gain Democratic: 50–60% 60–70% 70–80% 80–90% ≥90% Republican: 50–60% 60–70% 70–80% 80–90% ≥90%
Speaker before election
Pete Laney
Democratic
Elected Speaker
Pete Laney
Democratic

The 2000 Texas House of Representatives elections took place as part of the biennial United States elections. Texas voters elected state representatives in all 150 State House of Representatives districts. The winners of this election served in the 77th Texas Legislature. State representatives serve for two-year terms. There was no net change in seat control, leaving Democrats with their majority of 78 out of 150 seats. This was the last time Democrats won control of the chamber until 2026.

== Background ==
Democrats had held control of the Texas House of Representatives since Reconstruction despite Republicans winning the governorship in 1994 and the Texas Senate in 1996.

== Results ==
Democrats flipped one Republican-held seat, and Republicans flipped one Democratic-held seat, resulting in no net change. There were very few close races across the state. Democrats' victory allowed them to maintain their last foothold of power across the state, preventing the establishment of a Republican trifecta. This also prevented complete Republican control over the upcoming redistricting which was to take place after the 2000 census.

=== Statewide ===
Summary of the November 7, 2000 Texas House of Representatives election results
Party	Candidates	Votes	%	Seats	+/–
Democratic Party	97	2,129,633	41.03%	78	–
Republican Party	95	2,943,035	56.70%	72	–
Libertarian Party	24	117,055	2.26%	0	–
Write-in	1	461	0.01%	0	–
Total		5,190,184	100.00%	150	–

Popular vote
Republican	56.70%
Democratic	41.03%
Libertarian	2.28%
Write-in	0.01%

House seats won
Democratic	52.00%
Republican	48.00%

=== Close races ===
1. District 18, 2.50%
2. District 5, 5.06%
3. District 11, 6.10% (gain) (tipping-point district)
4. District 73, 8.80%
5. District 59, 8.80% (gain)
6. District 20, 9.61%

=== Results by district ===
District	Democratic		Republican		Others		Total		Result
District	Votes	%	Votes	%	Votes	%	Votes	%	Result
District 1	29,989	100.00%	-	-	-	-	29,989	100.00%	Democratic hold
District 2	29,702	100.00%	-	-	-	-	29,702	100.00%	Democratic hold
District 3	29,320	100.00%	-	-	-	-	29,320	100.00%	Democratic hold
District 4	16,492	36.15%	29,124	63.85%	-	-	45,616	100.00%	Republican hold
District 5	21,556	52.53%	19,478	47.47%	-	-	41,034	100.00%	Democratic hold
District 6	12,579	26.22%	35,404	73.78%	-	-	47,983	100.00%	Republican hold
District 7	-	-	29,574	100.00%	-	-	29,574	100.00%	Republican hold
District 8	32,833	100.00%	-	-	-	-	32,833	100.00%	Democratic hold
District 9	19,817	44.59%	24,625	55.41%	-	-	44,442	100.00%	Republican hold
District 10	-	-	35,932	100.00%	-	-	35,932	100.00%	Republican hold
District 11	21,991	53.05%	19,459	46.95%	-	-	41,450	100.00%	Democratic gain
District 12	32,095	100.00%	-	-	-	-	32,095	100.00%	Democratic hold
District 13	-	-	32,840	100.00%	-	-	32,840	100.00%	Republican hold
District 14	-	-	28,981	86.90%	4,369	13.10%	33,350	100.00%	Republican hold
District 15	-	-	53,164	88.38%	6,988	11.62%	60,152	100.00%	Republican hold
District 16	-	-	43,078	100.00%	-	-	43,078	100.00%	Republican hold
District 17	32,522	100.00%	-	-	-	-	32,522	100.00%	Democratic hold
District 18	24,013	51.25%	22,839	48.75%	-	-	46,852	100.00%	Democratic hold
District 19	29,869	100.00%	-	-	-	-	29,869	100.00%	Democratic hold
District 20	25,352	54.31%	20,868	44.70%	461	0.99%	46,681	100.00%	Democratic hold
District 21	27,033	56.26%	20,484	42.63%	531	1.11%	48,048	100.00%	Democratic hold
District 22	26,788	100.00%	-	-	-	-	26,788	100.00%	Democratic hold
District 23	25,232	56.84%	18,394	41.43%	767	1.73%	44,393	100.00%	Democratic hold
District 24	27,052	59.42%	18,473	40.58%	-	-	45,525	100.00%	Democratic hold
District 25	-	-	42,719	100.00%	-	-	42,719	100.00%	Republican hold
District 26	22,451	30.46%	51,245	69.54%	-	-	73,696	100.00%	Republican hold
District 27	28,209	64.02%	15,852	35.98%	-	-	44,061	100.00%	Democratic hold
District 28	29,937	63.35%	17,321	36.65%	-	-	47,258	100.00%	Democratic hold
District 29	24,376	100.00%	-	-	-	-	24,376	100.00%	Democratic hold
District 30	-	-	30,418	100.00%	-	-	30,418	100.00%	Republican hold
District 31	28,905	100.00%	-	-	-	-	28,905	100.00%	Democratic hold
District 32	-	-	37,056	100.00%	-	-	37,056	100.00%	Republican hold
District 33	25,326	100.00%	-	-	-	-	25,326	100.00%	Democratic hold
District 34	22,504	100.00%	-	-	-	-	22,504	100.00%	Democratic hold
District 35	23,440	100.00%	-	-	-	-	23,440	100.00%	Democratic hold
District 36	18,451	100.00%	-	-	-	-	18,451	100.00%	Democratic hold
District 37	15,796	100.00%	-	-	-	-	15,796	100.00%	Democratic hold
District 38	18,200	64.29%	10,111	35.71%	-	-	28,311	100.00%	Democratic hold
District 39	15,837	100.00%	-	-	-	-	15,837	100.00%	Democratic hold
District 40	19,023	100.00%	-	-	-	-	19,023	100.00%	Democratic hold
District 41	18,808	100.00%	-	-	-	-	18,808	100.00%	Democratic hold
District 42	23,089	100.00%	-	-	-	-	23,089	100.00%	Democratic hold
District 43	29,749	100.00%	-	-	-	-	29,749	100.00%	Democratic hold
District 44	22,435	55.15%	18,247	44.85%	-	-	40,682	100.00%	Democratic hold
District 45	-	-	49,380	100.00%	-	-	49,380	100.00%	Republican hold
District 46	18,648	38.66%	27,551	57.12%	2,031	4.21%	48,230	100.00%	Republican hold
District 47	-	-	74,958	83.12%	15,221	16.88%	90,179	100.00%	Republican hold
District 48	33,687	58.90%	21,300	37.24%	2,208	3.86%	57,195	100.00%	Democratic hold
District 49	29,833	58.66%	17,672	34.75%	3,355	6.60%	50,860	100.00%	Democratic hold
District 50	31,639	86.64%	-	-	4,877	13.36%	36,516	100.00%	Democratic hold
District 51	27,263	100.00%	-	-	-	-	27,263	100.00%	Democratic hold
District 52	-	-	54,196	83.94%	10,368	16.06%	64,564	100.00%	Republican hold
District 53	-	-	60,638	100.00%	-	-	60,638	100.00%	Republican hold
District 54	14,074	37.82%	23,139	62.18%	-	-	37,213	100.00%	Republican hold
District 55	-	-	26,089	100.00%	-	-	26,089	100.00%	Republican hold
District 56	-	-	35,156	100.00%	-	-	35,156	100.00%	Republican hold
District 57	25,415	100.00%	-	-	-	-	25,415	100.00%	Democratic hold
District 58	-	-	35,399	100.00%	-	-	35,399	100.00%	Republican hold
District 59	15,561	45.60%	18,566	54.40%	-	-	34,127	100.00%	Republican gain
District 60	-	-	35,395	100.00%	-	-	35,395	100.00%	Republican hold
District 61	-	-	42,150	100.00%	-	-	42,150	100.00%	Republican hold
District 62	-	-	35,073	100.00%	-	-	35,073	100.00%	Republican hold
District 63	-	-	51,103	88.08%	6,914	11.92%	58,017	100.00%	Republican hold
District 64	-	-	51,681	100.00%	-	-	51,681	100.00%	Republican hold
District 65	-	-	34,901	100.00%	-	-	34,901	100.00%	Republican hold
District 66	-	-	59,905	100.00%	-	-	59,905	100.00%	Republican hold
District 67	-	-	52,550	88.42%	6,882	11.58%	59,432	100.00%	Republican hold
District 68	17,405	42.06%	23,978	57.94%	-	-	41,383	100.00%	Republican hold
District 69	26,079	100.00%	-	-	-	-	26,079	100.00%	Democratic hold
District 70	26,189	100.00%	-	-	-	-	26,189	100.00%	Democratic hold
District 71	-	-	32,285	100.00%	-	-	32,285	100.00%	Republican hold
District 72	28,608	73.64%	10,243	26.36%	-	-	38,851	100.00%	Democratic hold
District 73	26,843	54.40%	22,503	45.60%	-	-	49,346	100.00%	Democratic hold
District 74	26,019	100.00%	-	-	-	-	26,019	100.00%	Democratic hold
District 75	21,528	100.00%	-	-	-	-	21,528	100.00%	Democratic hold
District 76	22,335	100.00%	-	-	-	-	22,335	100.00%	Democratic hold
District 77	16,213	100.00%	-	-	-	-	16,213	100.00%	Democratic hold
District 78	-	-	28,409	100.00%	-	-	28,409	100.00%	Republican hold
District 79	22,322	100.00%	-	-	-	-	22,322	100.00%	Democratic hold
District 80	-	-	23,728	100.00%	-	-	23,728	100.00%	Republican hold
District 81	-	-	25,933	100.00%	-	-	25,933	100.00%	Republican hold
District 82	8,798	21.72%	31,717	78.28%	-	-	40,515	100.00%	Republican hold
District 83	-	-	19,532	86.62%	3,017	13.38%	22,549	100.00%	Republican hold
District 84	-	-	37,135	87.60%	5,258	12.40%	42,393	100.00%	Republican hold
District 85	22,939	100.00%	-	-	-	-	22,939	100.00%	Democratic hold
District 86	-	-	40,989	100.00%	-	-	40,989	100.00%	Republican hold
District 87	-	-	23,856	100.00%	-	-	23,856	100.00%	Republican hold
District 88	-	-	33,339	100.00%	-	-	33,339	100.00%	Republican hold
District 89	14,077	37.41%	23,548	62.59%	-	-	37,625	100.00%	Republican hold
District 90	15,531	100.00%	-	-	-	-	15,531	100.00%	Democratic hold
District 91	-	-	36,186	100.00%	-	-	36,186	100.00%	Republican hold
District 92	-	-	35,192	100.00%	-	-	35,192	100.00%	Republican hold
District 93	-	-	24,833	100.00%	-	-	24,833	100.00%	Republican hold
District 94	-	-	35,792	100.00%	-	-	35,792	100.00%	Republican hold
District 95	28,851	100.00%	-	-	-	-	28,851	100.00%	Democratic hold
District 96	-	-	39,604	86.57%	6,146	13.43%	45,750	100.00%	Republican hold
District 97	-	-	41,799	87.98%	5,708	12.02%	47,507	100.00%	Republican hold
District 98	15,702	24.36%	47,045	72.99%	1,711	2.65%	64,458	100.00%	Republican hold
District 99	-	-	37,713	100.00%	-	-	37,713	100.00%	Republican hold
District 100	19,907	100.00%	-	-	-	-	19,907	100.00%	Democratic hold
District 101	16,675	41.60%	23,410	58.40%	-	-	40,085	100.00%	Republican hold
District 102	14,360	35.22%	26,418	64.78%	-	-	40,778	100.00%	Republican hold
District 103	14,156	100.00%	-	-	-	-	14,156	100.00%	Democratic hold
District 104	10,864	72.78%	4,064	27.22%	-	-	14,928	100.00%	Democratic hold
District 105	16,576	63.64%	9,470	36.36%	-	-	26,046	100.00%	Democratic hold
District 106	14,631	41.82%	20,356	58.18%	-	-	34,987	100.00%	Republican hold
District 107	18,511	59.41%	12,645	40.59%	-	-	31,156	100.00%	Democratic hold
District 108	-	-	40,295	100.00%	-	-	40,295	100.00%	Republican hold
District 109	27,569	100.00%	-	-	-	-	27,569	100.00%	Democratic hold
District 110	30,283	100.00%	-	-	-	-	30,283	100.00%	Democratic hold
District 111	28,982	100.00%	-	-	-	-	28,982	100.00%	Democratic hold
District 112	-	-	28,535	100.00%	-	-	28,535	100.00%	Republican hold
District 113	-	-	32,474	100.00%	-	-	32,474	100.00%	Republican hold
District 114	13,702	31.97%	29,153	68.03%	-	-	42,855	100.00%	Republican hold
District 115	18,773	100.00%	-	-	-	-	18,773	100.00%	Democratic hold
District 116	20,350	100.00%	-	-	-	-	20,350	100.00%	Democratic hold
District 117	16,490	100.00%	-	-	-	-	16,490	100.00%	Democratic hold
District 118	19,748	100.00%	-	-	-	-	19,748	100.00%	Democratic hold
District 119	22,773	100.00%	-	-	-	-	22,773	100.00%	Democratic hold
District 120	20,178	100.00%	-	-	-	-	20,178	100.00%	Democratic hold
District 121	12,927	28.68%	30,756	68.24%	1,387	3.08%	45,070	100.00%	Republican hold
District 122	-	-	50,427	85.78%	8,362	14.22%	58,789	100.00%	Republican hold
District 123	-	-	43,487	84.59%	7,925	15.41%	51,412	100.00%	Republican hold
District 124	26,413	100.00%	-	-	-	-	26,413	100.00%	Democratic hold
District 125	18,947	59.48%	12,906	40.52%	-	-	31,853	100.00%	Democratic hold
District 126	-	-	43,867	100.00%	-	-	43,867	100.00%	Republican hold
District 127	-	-	40,478	100.00%	-	-	40,478	100.00%	Republican hold
District 128	20,369	100.00%	-	-	-	-	20,369	100.00%	Democratic hold
District 129	-	-	38,503	87.93%	5,283	12.07%	43,786	100.00%	Republican hold
District 130	15,230	23.42%	48,223	74.16%	1,576	2.42%	65,029	100.00%	Republican hold
District 131	27,360	100.00%	-	-	-	-	27,360	100.00%	Democratic hold
District 132	30,755	100.00%	-	-	-	-	30,755	100.00%	Democratic hold
District 133	-	-	35,043	88.50%	4,555	11.50%	39,598	100.00%	Republican hold
District 134	14,494	41.11%	20,764	58.89%	-	-	35,258	100.00%	Republican hold
District 135	-	-	40,946	100.00%	-	-	40,946	100.00%	Republican hold
District 136	-	-	38,233	100.00%	-	-	38,233	100.00%	Republican hold
District 137	19,822	62.14%	12,075	37.86%	-	-	31,897	100.00%	Democratic hold
District 138	18,844	62.39%	11,360	37.61%	-	-	30,204	100.00%	Democratic hold
District 139	22,642	100.00%	-	-	-	-	22,642	100.00%	Democratic hold
District 140	13,261	100.00%	-	-	-	-	13,261	100.00%	Democratic hold
District 141	27,737	100.00%	-	-	-	-	27,737	100.00%	Democratic hold
District 142	25,464	100.00%	-	-	-	-	25,464	100.00%	Democratic hold
District 143	12,883	69.06%	5,773	30.94%	-	-	18,656	100.00%	Democratic hold
District 144	11,734	37.83%	19,281	62.17%	-	-	31,015	100.00%	Republican hold
District 145	12,158	71.43%	4,863	28.57%	-	-	17,021	100.00%	Democratic hold
District 146	30,459	100.00%	-	-	-	-	30,459	100.00%	Democratic hold
District 147	21,882	93.12%	-	-	1,616	6.88%	23,498	100.00%	Democratic hold
District 148	15,394	100.00%	-	-	-	-	15,394	100.00%	Democratic hold
District 149	-	-	22,707	100.00%	-	-	22,707	100.00%	Republican hold
District 150	-	-	38,676	100.00%	-	-	38,676	100.00%	Republican hold
Total	2,129,633	41.03%	2,943,035	56.70%	117,516	2.27%	5,190,184	100.00%	
