= 1980 Texas Senate election =

- November 4, 1980

16 of the 31 seats in the Texas Senate 16 seats needed for a majority
	Majority party	Minority party
Party	Democratic	Republican
Last election	27	4
Seats won	24	7
Seat change	▼3	▲3
- Senate results by district Democratic hold Democratic gain Republican hold Republican gain No election
President Pro Tempore before election
Democratic
Elected President Pro Tempore
Democratic

The 1980 Texas Senate elections took place as part of the biennial United States elections. Texas voters elected state senators 16 of the 31 State Senate districts. The winners of this election served in the 67th Texas Legislature for two-year terms, with all senators up for election in 1982.

== Background ==
Democrats had controlled the Texas Senate since the 1872 elections. Texas had historically been a solidly-Democratic state, owing to its history as a part of the Solid South, but this changed dramatically in the 1970s. Republican Richard Nixon won the state in a landslide in the 1972 presidential election and Bill Clements became the first Republican to win the governorship in over 100 years in a narrow 1978 victory. These victories rarely extended far down the ballot, however, with Democrats still holding large supermajorities in both houses of the legislature.

=== "Killer Bees" quorum bust ===
The most controversial bill to come up during the regular session of the 66th legislature was a bill to split the state's primary election, creating a separate March primary for the state's presidential nominating delegates while retaining a May primary date for all other offices. Supporters argued it would give the state more influence in presidential politics, while critics accused them of using the measure to support former governor John Connally, who had recently switched to the Republican Party, in his 1980 presidential campaign. A split primary would have allowed conservative Democrats to vote in the Republican presidential primary while voting in the Democratic primary for other offices. Twelve liberal Democratic Senators left the capitol in May 1979 to break quorum, preventing the chamber from conducting any business. They continued to do so for over four days until Republicans and conservative Democrats agreed to drop the bill.

== Results ==
Republicans made a net gain of three seats from the Democrats, bringing their caucus to seven out of thirty-one seats. This large shift came on the coattails of Ronald Reagan's landslide victory in the state in the 1980 presidential election. Republicans won their largest share of legislative seats since the end of Reconstruction over 100 years prior.

Among the defeated Democrats was longtime Galveston Senator Babe Schwartz, a fixture of the Senate's liberal "yellow-dog" faction who was a leader of the "Killer Bees" who broke quorum during the 1979 legislative session. Two other members of the "Killer Bees," Gene Jones of Garland and Ron Clower of Houston, also lost re-election.

=== Results by district ===
District	Democratic		Republican		Libertarian		Total		Result
District	Votes	%	Votes	%	Votes	%	Votes	%	Result
District 4	-	100.00%	-	-	-	-	-	100.00%	Democratic hold
District 5	104,362	65.84%	54,157	34.16%	-	-	158,519	100.00%	Democratic hold
District 7	67,691	46.99%	74,368	51.63%	1,987	1.38%	144,046	100.00%	Republican gain
District 8	36,090	27.42%	91,457	69.48%	4,093	3.11%	131,640	100.00%	Republican hold
District 9	71,342	46.15%	83,249	53.85%	-	-	154,591	100.00%	Republican gain
District 13	-	-	-	100.00%	-	-	-	100.00%	Republican hold
District 15	56,480	55.20%	43,670	42.68%	2,168	2.12%	102,318	100.00%	Democratic hold
District 16	54,979	46.54%	60,191	50.95%	2,974	2.52%	118,144	100.00%	Republican gain
District 17	70,997	49.73%	71,775	50.27%	-	-	142,772	100.00%	Republican gain
District 18	81,538	65.46%	43,031	34.54%	-	-	124,569	100.00%	Democratic hold
District 19	70,132	71.77%	27,588	28.23%	-	-	97,720	100.00%	Democratic hold
District 20	72,611	58.00%	52,587	42.00%	-	-	125,198	100.00%	Democratic hold
District 22	95,552	57.57%	70,431	42.43%	-	-	165,983	100.00%	Democratic hold
District 24	-	100.00%	-	-	-	-	-	100.00%	Democratic hold
District 29	-	100.00%	-	-	-	-	-	100.00%	Democratic hold
District 31	91,043	65.35%	48,268	34.65%	-	-	139,311	100.00%	Democratic gain
Total	–	–	–	–	11,222	–	–	100.00%	Source:
