= 1984 Texas Senate election =

- November 6, 1984

15 of the 31 seats in the Texas Senate 16 seats needed for a majority
| | Majority party | Minority party |
|---|---|---|
| Party | Democratic | Republican |
| Last election | 26 | 5 |
| Seats won | 25 | 6 |
| Seat change | ▼1 | ▲1 |
- Senate results by district Democratic hold Republican hold Republican gain No election
President Pro Tempore before election
Democratic
Elected President Pro Tempore
Democratic

The 1984 Texas Senate elections took place as part of the biennial United States elections. Texas voters elected state senators in 15 of the 31 State Senate. The winners of this election served in the 69th Texas Legislature.

== Background ==
Democrats had controlled the Texas Senate since the 1872 elections. The Legislature passed redistricting bills in 1981, but Republican governor Bill Clements vetoed the state Senate map. The Legislative Redistricting Board, made up entirely of Democrats, was then tasked with drawing the map for the chamber. Despite this partisan unanimity, stark divisions came about on the Board due to each member's own goals, ranging from incumbency protection to the expansion of minority representation. Each member's potential gubernatorial ambitions also underscored the debate. The Board eventually passed a map in a 4–1 vote, with Comptroller Bob Bullock dissenting.

The Senate maps passed by the Board were challenged by a lawsuit in Terrazas v. Clements. Additionally, the Justice Department blocked both maps for violating the Voting Rights Act. Given the imminence of the March primary, the courts allowed the maps to be used for the 1982 elections. In 1983, the legislature adopted a modified version of the court's map. They addressed objections from the Justice Department and the Mexican American Legal Defense and Educational Fund, changing eight Senate districts but avoiding a full redrawing, which would have necessitated re-electing all senators. The courts approved the plan.

== Results ==
Republicans gained one seat from the Democrats, flipping the 26th district in San Antonio. Cyndi Taylor Krier flipped the seat, becoming the first Republican and first woman from Bexar County ever elected the Senate. At the time, she was considered a progressive Republican due to her support of the Equal Rights Amendment and abortion rights.

=== Results by district ===
| District | Democratic | | Republican | | Total | | Result |
| District | Votes | % | Votes | % | Votes | % | Result |
|---|---|---|---|---|---|---|---|
| District 1 | - | 100.00% | - | - | - | 100.00% | Democratic hold |
| District 2 | 87,233 | 50.60% | 85,171 | 49.40% | 172,404 | 100.00% | Democratic hold |
| District 3 | - | 100.00% | - | - | - | 100.00% | Democratic hold |
| District 4 | - | 100.00% | - | - | - | 100.00% | Democratic hold |
| District 8 | - | - | - | 100.00% | - | 100.00% | Republican hold |
| District 9 | - | 100.00% | - | - | - | 100.00% | Democratic hold |
| District 14 | 136,373 | 59.42% | 93,132 | 40.58% | 229,505 | 100.00% | Democratic hold |
| District 17 | - | - | - | 100.00% | - | 100.00% | Republican hold |
| District 20 | - | 100.00% | - | - | - | 100.00% | Democratic hold |
| District 22 | - | 100.00% | - | - | - | 100.00% | Democratic hold |
| District 24 | - | 100.00% | - | - | - | 100.00% | Democratic hold |
| District 26 | 60,077 | 38.75% | 94,945 | 61.25% | 155,022 | 100.00% | Republican gain |
| District 28 | 99,672 | 64.10% | 55,816 | 35.90% | 155,488 | 100.00% | Democratic hold |
| District 30 | - | 100.00% | - | - | - | 100.00% | Democratic hold |
| District 31 | - | 100.00% | - | - | - | 100.00% | Democratic hold |
| Total | – | – | – | – | – | 100.00% | Source: |
