= Frank Kell Cahoon =

American politician (1934–2013)

Member of the Texas House of Representatives from the 70th district
- In office January 10, 1967 – January 14, 1969
- Preceded by: Amando F. Canales
- Succeeded by: Tom Craddick

Member of the Texas House of Representatives from the 77th district
- In office January 12, 1965 – January 10, 1967
- Preceded by: William S. Davis
- Succeeded by: Delwin Jones

Personal details
- Born: June 20, 1934 Austin, Texas, U.S.
- Died: January 30, 2013 (aged 78) Midland, Texas, U.S.
- Party: Republican
- Education: Colorado School of Mines; University of Texas at Austin

Military service
- Branch/service: United States Army

Frank Kell Cahoon (June 20, 1934 – January 30, 2013) was an American politician who served in the Texas House of Representatives from 1965 to 1969.

Cahoon was born in Austin, Texas, and grew up in Wichita Falls, Texas. He attended the Colorado School of Mines and University of Texas at Austin. Cahoon served in the United States Army and was involved in the oil business in Midland, Texas. He served on the Midland City Council. In 1964, he ran for the Texas House of Representatives and was elected, becoming the state's only Republican state legislator in 1965.

He was named after his maternal grandfather, Frank Kell.

Cahoon died on January 30, 2013, at the age of 78, at his home in Midland, Texas.

Texas House of Representatives
Preceded by William S. Davis	Member of the Texas House of Representatives from the 77th district January 12, 1965 – January 10, 1967	Succeeded by Delwin Jones
Preceded by Amando F. Canales	Member of the Texas House of Representatives from the 70th district January 10, 1967 – January 14, 1969	Succeeded by Tom Craddick
