= Rodney Anderson (Texas politician) =

American politician and businessman

Member of the Texas House of Representatives
- In office January 13, 2015 – January 8, 2019
- Preceded by: Linda Harper-Brown
- Succeeded by: Terry Meza
- Constituency: 105th district
- In office January 11, 2011 – January 8, 2013
- Preceded by: Kirk England
- Succeeded by: Pat Fallon
- Constituency: 106th district

Personal details
- Born: Grand Prairie, Texas, U.S.
- Party: Republican
- Education: University of Texas at Arlington (BBA)

Rodney Anderson is an American politician and businessman who served as a member of the Texas House of Representatives from 2015 to 2019, representing the 105th district. He previously represented the 106th district from 2011 to 2013.

== Early life and education ==
Anderson was born and raised in Grand Prairie, Texas. In 1990, he earned a Bachelor of Business Administration in Real Estate from the University of Texas at Arlington.

== Career ==
Anderson was elected to the Texas House of Representatives in 2010 and took office in 2011. After annual redistricting where he was paired with another incumbent Republican, he chose not to run for re-election in 2012. He ran in 2014 where he defeated Linda Harper-Brown in the 105th district. He was defeated for re-election by Democrat Terry Meza and left office in January 2019. In March 2019, Anderson was selected to serve as the Chairman of the Dallas County Republican Party.
