= Terry Meza =

American politician

Member of the Texas House of Representatives from the 105th district
- Incumbent
- Assumed office January 8, 2019
- Preceded by: Rodney Anderson

Personal details
- Born: Thresa Meza; August 1, 1949 (age 76) Dallas, Texas, U.S.
- Party: Democratic
- Education: University of Texas at Arlington (BA); Texas Wesleyan University (JD)
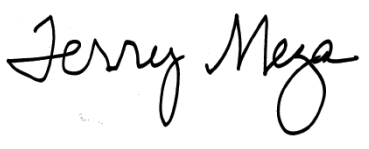
- Signature
- Website: Campaign website

Thresa "Terry" Meza (born August 1, 1949) is an American politician and attorney serving as a member of the Texas House of Representatives from the 105th district.

== Early life and education ==
Born in Oak Cliff, Dallas, she was raised in Irving, Texas and attended Irving High School. She earned a Bachelor of Arts degree from the University of Texas at Arlington and a Juris Doctor from the Texas Wesleyan University School of Law (now Texas A&M University School of Law).

== Career ==
Prior to serving in the Texas House of Representatives, Meza worked as a teacher at South Grand Prairie High School and operated an independent legal practice. Meza was elected to the House in 2018, defeating incumbent Republican Rodney Anderson. She is a member of the Democratic Party. In 2020, Meza introduced HB196, a bill to modify Texas' "Castle Doctrine" to require homeowners to retreat into their own homes if it can safely be done rather than using deadly force against those who are stealing property from outside their home.
