= 1982 Texas Senate election =

- November 2, 1982

All 31 seats in the Texas Senate 16 seats needed for a majority
	Majority party	Minority party
Party	Democratic	Republican
Last election	24	7
Seats won	26	5
Seat change	▲2	▼2
- Democratic hold Democratic gain Republican hold Republican gain Democratic: 50–60% 60–70% 70–80% 80–90% ≥90% Republican: 50–60% 80–90% ≥90%
President Pro Tempore before election
Democratic
Elected President Pro Tempore
Democratic

The 1982 Texas Senate elections took place as part of the biennial United States elections. Texas voters elected state senators in all 31 State Senate districts. The winners of this election served in the 68th Texas Legislature, serving staggered terms, with half of them up for election in 1984 and the other half up in 1986.

== Background ==
Democrats had controlled the Texas Senate since the 1872 elections. The Legislature passed redistricting bills in 1981, but Republican governor Bill Clements vetoed the state Senate map. The Legislative Redistricting Board, made up entirely of Democrats, was then tasked with drawing the map for the chamber. Despite this partisan unanimity, stark divisions came about on the Board due to each member's own goals, ranging from incumbency protection to the expansion of minority representation. Several members' potential gubernatorial ambitions also underscored the debate. The Board eventually passed a map in a 4–1 vote, with Comptroller Bob Bullock dissenting.

State office	1981 board member
Lieutenant governor	William P. Hobby Jr. (D)
Speaker of the House	Bill W. Clayton (D)
Attorney general	Mark White (D)
Comptroller	Bob Bullock (D) (Note: Bullock voted against the map passed by the Board.)
Land commissioner	Bob Armstrong (D)

The Senate map passed by the Board was challenged by a lawsuit in Terrazas v. Clements. Additionally, the Justice Department blocked both maps for violating the Voting Rights Act. These challenges were primarily focused on the map's alleged dilution of Hispanic representation. The map maintained the presence of two districts, one in Houston and the other in Dallas, with substantial African American populations, as required by previous court rulings. Given the imminence of the March primary, and a failed appeal to the U.S. Supreme Court, the courts allowed the map to be used for the 1982 elections.

== Results ==
Democrats expanded their supermajority, winning twenty six seats, a gain of two from the 1980 elections. The Republican Party had been on a resurgence in the past decade, winning the governorship for the first time since Reconstruction in 1978 and reaching a high mark in the 1980 elections amid the Reagan Revolution. A lagging economy and high urban turnout lead to an underwhelming result in 1982, however, with Republicans losing the governorship and ground in the legislature. Of the two predominantly African American districts, District 13 in Houston elected Black Democrat Craig Washington, while District 23 in Dallas re-elected White Democrat Oscar Mauzy.

=== Results by district ===
District	Democratic		Republican		Others		Total		Result
District	Votes	%	Votes	%	Votes	%	Votes	%	Result
District 1	81,096	96.57%	-	-	2,877	3.43%	83,973	100.00%	Democratic hold
District 2	63,561	59.22%	43,168	40.22%	610	0.57%	107,339	100.00%	Democratic hold
District 3	83,626	95.12%	-	-	4,291	4.88%	87,917	100.00%	Democratic hold
District 4	80,242	92.16%	-	-	6,829	7.84%	87,071	100.00%	Democratic hold
District 5	81,207	94.65%	-	-	4,591	5.35%	85,798	100.00%	Democratic hold
District 6	44,054	89.04%	-	-	5,422	10.96%	49,476	100.00%	Democratic hold
District 7	-	-	83,920	94.01%	5,346	5.99%	89,266	100.00%	Republican hold
District 8	-	-	90,911	86.92%	13,686	13.08%	104,597	100.00%	Republican hold
District 9	85,613	95.72%	-	-	3,825	4.28%	89,438	100.00%	Democratic gain
District 10	-	-	64,318	89.96%	7,180	10.04%	71,498	100.00%	Republican gain
District 11	56,348	68.20%	26,278	31.80%	-	-	82,626	100.00%	Democratic hold
District 12	82,626	54.62%	47,259	44.00%	1,480	1.38%	107,406	100.00%	Democratic gain
District 13	69,567	90.62%	-	-	7,202	9.38%	76,769	100.00%	Democratic gain
District 14	96,147	71.87%	37,627	28.13%	-	-	133,774	100.00%	Democratic hold
District 15	51,409	62.26%	29,198	35.36%	1,965	2.38%	82,572	100.00%	Democratic hold
District 16	38,669	38.29%	60,046	59.46%	2,265	2.24%	100,980	100.00%	Republican hold
District 17	-	-	64,331	86.88%	9,713	13.12%	74,044	100.00%	Republican hold
District 18	67,563	66.75%	32,298	31.91%	1,350	1.33%	101,211	100.00%	Democratic hold
District 19	49,812	65.28%	26,498	34.72%	-	-	76,310	100.00%	Democratic hold
District 20	69,218	85.88%	-	-	11,385	14.12%	80,603	100.00%	Democratic hold
District 21	-	100.00%	-	-	-	-	-	100.00%	Democratic hold
District 22	77,184	68.39%	34,569	30.63%	1,101	0.98%	112,854	100.00%	Democratic hold
District 23	63,757	79.21%	15,579	19.35%	1,155	1.43%	80,491	100.00%	Democratic hold
District 24	-	100.00%	-	-	-	-	-	100.00%	Democratic hold
District 25	57,522	51.82%	52,868	47.63%	610	0.55%	111,000	100.00%	Democratic hold
District 26	57,368	88.76%	-	-	7,265	11.24%	64,633	100.00%	Democratic hold
District 27	-	100.00%	-	-	-	-	-	100.00%	Democratic hold
District 28	62,642	62.44%	36,511	36.39%	1,168	1.16%	100,321	100.00%	Democratic hold
District 29	100,321	80.39%	-	-	12,182	19.61%	62,119	100.00%	Democratic hold
District 30	89,308	95.36%	-	-	4,344	4.64%	93,652	100.00%	Democratic hold
District 31	81,030	73.28%	28,259	25.56%	1,290	1.17%	110,579	100.00%	Democratic hold
Total	–	–	773,638	–	119,132	–	–	100.00%	Source:
