= Texas's 82nd House of Representatives district =

American legislative district

Texas's 82nd State House of Representatives district
Representative
Tom Craddick; R–Midland

District 82 is a district in the Texas House of Representatives. It has been represented by Republican Tom Craddick since 1993 (though he has served consecutive terms in the house since 1969).

== Geography ==
The district covers the West Texas counties of Dawson, Martin and Midland.

== Members ==
- Jack Ritter (until 1963)
- Bob Armstrong (1963–1971)
- William S. Heatly (1971–1973)
- John Whitmire (1973–1983)
- Nolan Robnett (after 1983)
- Tom Craddick (since 1993)
