= Texas's 105th House of Representatives district =

American legislative district

Texas's 105th State House of Representatives district
Representative
Terry Meza; D–Dallas
- Demographics: 21.0% White; 14.6% Black; 50.2% Hispanic; 13.6% Asian
- Population (2020) • Voting age: 191,644; 143,476

The 105th district of the Texas House of Representatives consists of the majority of the city of Irving, in Dallas County The current representative is Terry Meza, who has represented the district since 2019.

The district contains the eastern half of DFW International Airport.
