= Tom Craddick =

American politician (born 1943)

Speaker of the Texas House of Representatives
- In office January 14, 2003 – January 13, 2009
- Preceded by: Pete Laney
- Succeeded by: Joe Straus

Member of the Texas House of Representatives
- Incumbent
- Assumed office January 14, 1969
- Preceded by: Frank Kell Cahoon
- Constituency: 70th district (1969–1973); 68th district (1973–1983); 76th district (1983–1993); 82nd district (1993–present)

Personal details
- Born: Thomas Russell Craddick; September 19, 1943 (age 83) Beloit, Wisconsin, U.S.
- Party: Republican
- Spouse: Nadine Nayfa (m. 1969)
- Children: 2, including Christi Craddick
- Education: Texas Tech University (BBA, MBA)
- Occupation: Businessman
- Website: Office website Campaign website

Thomas Russell Craddick Sr. (born September 19, 1943) is an American politician serving as a member of the Texas House of Representatives since 1969. A member of the Republican Party, he served as the speaker of the Texas House of Representatives from 2003 to 2009.

Craddick was first elected in 1968 at the age of twenty-five and, as of 2025, is the longest serving legislator in the history of the Texas House of Representatives and the longest serving incumbent state legislator in the United States.

On July 1, 2025, Craddick announced he would be running in 2026 for his 30th term.

== Early life and career ==
Craddick was born in Beloit, Wisconsin to Russell F. Craddick (1913-1986) and Beatrice (née Kowalick) Craddick (1914-2001). He lived in Beloit until he was nine years old. He became an Eagle Scout. He had 3 sisters, Betty, Judy, and Bonnie. Craddick holds BBA and MBA degrees from the Rawls College of Business at Texas Tech.

== Texas House of Representatives ==
While he was a doctoral student at Texas Tech University in Lubbock, Craddick decided to run for the legislature to succeed the incumbent Republican Frank Kell Cahoon of Midland, who was not seeking a third two-year term. According to Craddick's official biography, even his father, businessman R.F. Craddick (1913–1986), warned him: "Texas is run by Democrats. You can't win." Although this part of Texas had been trending Republican at the national level for some time (for instance, Midland itself has not voted for a Democratic presidential candidate since 1948), Democrats continued to hold most local offices well into the 1980s.

He was one of nine Republicans in the chamber at the time of his election, which coincided with Richard Nixon's first presidential win. He lived in a house with seven Democrats when he was elected. As he was trying to park at the Texas State Capitol, Craddick and his parents had to convince a police officer that Craddick was actually going to be a member of the Texas House and therefore could park in the House member's parking lot.

In 1975, Craddick was named chairman of the House Natural Resources Committee, the first Republican to have chaired a Texas legislative committee in more than a century. At that time in Texas, a legislator did not need to be in the majority party in order to chair a committee.

In 1989, Craddick authored a measure to urge the US Congress to open oil exploration in the Arctic National Wildlife Refuge.

In 2009, he was assigned to the Energy Resources and State Affairs committees.

Since 2011, as the longest serving member, Craddick has held the title of "Dean of the House". In January 2019, he achieved 50 years in the Texas House. Since 2021, he has shared the title with Senfronia Thompson, the longest serving female representative.

In March 2011, Craddick collapsed at the State Capitol while speaking about a bill in front of the Transportation Committee. His office later said that he was not seriously injured and it was related to a leg problem that Craddick was healing from.

Beginning in 2011, Craddick tried to get a bill passed banning texting while driving. In 2011, Governor Rick Perry vetoed Craddick's bill, after it made its way through the House and Senate. In 2013, his bill, House Bill 63, passed in the House but died in the Senate. Craddick attributed the bill not passing to Senator Robert Nichols refusing to put the bill up for a vote in the Senate Transportation committee, which he chaired. In March 2015, the Texas House Transportation Committee unanimously passed House Bill 80, authored by Craddick, banning texting while driving. This bill never made it to the full House. On May 17, 2019, the Senate amended Craddick's bill, House Bill 62, with a vote of 23-8, in favor. The House passed Craddick's bill with the Senate amendments, with a vote of 123-17, in favor. On June 6, 2017, House Bill 62 was signed into law by Governor Greg Abbott, effective September 1, 2017.

In 2023, Craddick authored a bill to replace "mental retardation" in Texas Government Codes to "intellectual disability". This was signed into law by Governor Abbott in May 2023.

On July 1, 2025, Craddick announced he would be running in 2026 for his 30th term. He ran unopposed in the Republican primary and is running against Democrat Cathy Broadrick in the general election.

== Speaker of the House ==
On January 11, 2003, after thirty-four years in the House, Craddick became the first Republican Speaker in more than 130 years, since the era of Reconstruction Era. He held the presiding officer's position for six years. During his speakership, the state went from $10 billion dollar budget deficit to $10 billion dollar surplus.

In December 2006, Craddick faced credible challenges to his re-election as Speaker for the Eightieth Texas Legislature: Brian McCall (R-Plano), Jim Pitts (R-Waxahachie), and Senfronia Thompson (D-Houston), all of whom announced candidacies for the speakership. In early January, McCall withdrew and endorsed Pitts. Supporters of Pitts pressed for a secret ballot in order to avoid retribution should their efforts fail, while Craddick had maintained all along that he had more than the minimum number of votes needed for re-election. When the secret ballot measure failed, Pitts withdrew, and Craddick was re-elected to a third term as Speaker on January 9, 2007, by a vote of 121-27.

=== Removal Attempt ===
Craddick became increasingly unpopular with not only Democrats but those of his own party, and many called for a new Speaker to be elected. In the most extreme case, Craddick's political views and leadership compelled Kirk England (R-Grand Prairie) to change parties and run for re-election as a Democrat in 2008. Chaos erupted in the Texas House of Representatives on May 25, 2007, when Fred Hill, a Republican from Richardson, attempted to raise a question of privilege to remove Craddick from office, but Craddick refused to Recognize him to make the motion. The attempts to oust Craddick continued through the weekend as other Republicans made additional motions, which were also disallowed for a time. Craddick's close allies, such as Representative Phil King of Weatherford, said that the actions against the Speaker were an effort by Democrats to gain control of the legislature before the legislative and congressional redistricting process of 2011. However, then Representative Byron Cook (R-Corsicana) said that the fight was about Craddick having consolidated power with lobbyists and having used campaign contributions to maintain control in the House: "This is about the convergence of money and power and influence," Cook said.

Craddick recessed the legislature for two and a half hours after Representatives attempted to gain recognition to put the question of Craddick's removal to a vote. When Hill asked to vote to remove Mr. Craddick, the Speaker replied: "The Speaker's power of recognition on any matter cannot be appealed." His parliamentarian, Denise Davis disagreed, stating that a question of privilege relating to the removal of a Speaker from office is such a highly privileged one that the Speaker may not refuse recognition. When Craddick shunned her advice, Davis and her assistant, Chris Griesel, resigned. Craddick immediately hired former Representative Terry Keel of Austin to the post as well as former Representative Ron Wilson as Keel's assistant. The new parliamentarians upheld Craddick's decision and the session resumed until 1 a.m. and despite further protests from members of the legislature, Craddick remained in his position as Speaker, and the session was recessed.

In January 2009, Craddick was not reelected as Speaker after nearly the entire Democratic Caucus and a number of Republicans broke ranks to vote for Joe Straus, a two-term moderate Republican from San Antonio. Straus remained speaker for five terms until his retirement from the House in January 2019. The last Texas House Speaker to be removed had also been a Republican, Ira Hobart Evans, who was rejected in 1871 for cooperating with Democrats on an elections bill. Craddick won reelection to his House seat in the general election on November 2, 2010.

== Personal life ==
Craddick married the former Nadine Nayfa on September 9, 1969 in her hometown of Sweetwater in west Texas. She is of Lebanese descent. They have two children, a daughter Christi Craddick, and a son, Thomas Jr., as well as a grandson, Thomas Russell Craddick III. In 1976, Craddick created the Craddick Children's Trust for his two children. In 2013, it was transferred to Quarry, an oil company owned by them. In 2012, when Craddick won his 23rd term in the Texas House, Christi was easily elected as a Republican to the Texas Railroad Commission, the state's oil and gas regulatory body.

=== Business Interests ===
Nadine is also on the Board of Directors at the Meadows Mental Health Policy Institute. Tom Craddick is president of Craddick, Inc., a sales representative for Horizon Mud Company and owns Craddick Properties. Craddick Inc. and Craddick Partners Ltd. are ran from his home in Midland. His wife is a Vice President of Craddick, Inc.

Tom and Christi Craddick both have ownership interests in 360 oil and gas leases in the 22 counties across Texas, with a value of over $20 million. Craddick receives royalties of more than $2 million per year for brokering extraction lease sales, which are potential conflicts of interest as he sits on the committee that oversees the state's oil industry. Craddick was elected to the board of directors of Mexco Energy Corporation in March 1998, which brings the number of leases they are involved with to over 600. Craddick introduced a bill that would preserve the interests of holders of overriding royalties such as his own; he has reintroduced it after it was vetoed by Governor Abbott.

=== Honors ===
On December 10, 2009, a section of Texas State Highway 349, a "reliever route" was opened, which was named the Nadine and Tom Craddick Highway after Craddick and his wife, who helped to create the highway.

Craddick and his wife have founded several scholarship funds including: The Tom and Nadine Craddick Presidential Scholarship Endowment for the Texas Tech University System, the Nadine and Tom Craddick Distinguished Chair in Medical Science Endowment for The University of Texas Southwestern Medical Center, and the Nadine Craddick Endowment Fund for the Midland Memorial Foundation at Midland Memorial Hospital.

On April 18, 2013, Craddick was inducted into the Permian Basin Petroleum Museum’s “Petroleum Hall of Fame.” for being one of “...those who cherished the freedom to dare, and whose work and service helped build the Permian Basin,” and "...have been refined by the industry over the years in their efforts to grow a business or pass legislation that affects it." His picture is featured in there. On October 15, 2024, Texas Tech University of Health Sciences Center named their Physician Assistant's Program for Nadine and Thomas Craddick.

On January 28, 2025, The Midland International Air and Space Port unveiled a sculpture of Tom and Nadine to honor them.

== Electoral history ==
=== Summary ===
Craddick has won 29 elections since 1968, being uncontested in all his primary runs after 1968, and uncontested in the general elections in 1974, 1978–1982, 1986, 1992–1998, 2002–2006, 2010–2016, 2020 and 2022 general elections, or 17 out 30 elections. He routinely garnered at least 70% of the vote in his contested elections, with only two elections where he received less, being in 1970 when he received 52.2% and in 2008 when he received 62.12%.

=== Texas House, 70th district (1968, 1970) ===
Year	Election	Date	Elected				Defeated				Total	Plurality
1968	Primary	May 4	Tom Craddick	Republican	1,698	73.06%	Joe S. Davis	Rep.	626	26.94%	2,324	1,072
1968	General	Nov. 5	Tom Craddick	Republican	14,493	70.85%	Ray O. Howard	Dem.	5,963	29.15%	20,456	8,530
1970	General	Nov. 3	Tom Craddick (inc)	Republican	8,468	52.20%	Bob Northington	Dem.	7,752	47.80%	16,220	716

=== Texas House, 68th district (1972–1980) ===
Year	Election	Date	Elected				Defeated				Total	Plurality
1972	General	Nov. 7	Tom Craddick	Republican	18,175	70.52%	Willie B. DuBose	Dem.	7,601	29.48%	25,776	10,574
1974	General	Nov. 5	Tom Craddick (inc)	Republican	N/A	100.0%	--Unopposed--				37,062	N/A
1976	General	Nov. 2	Tom Craddick (inc)	Republican	20,238	71.29%	R. L. "Bob" Corley	Dem.	8,147	28.71%	28,385	12,091
1978	General	Nov. 7	Tom Craddick (inc)	Republican	13,564	100.0%	--Unopposed--				13,564	N/A
1980	General	Nov. 4	Tom Craddick (inc)	Republican	22,946	100.0%	--Unopposed--				22,946	N/A

=== Texas House, 76th district (1982–1990) ===
Year	Election	Date	Elected				Defeated				Total	Plurality
1982	General	Nov. 2	Tom Craddick	Republican	18,873	100.0%	--Unopposed--				18,873	N/A
1984	General	Nov. 6	Tom Craddick (inc)	Republican	38,716	79.23%	G. David Smith	Dem.	10,151	20.77%	48,867	28,565
1986	General	Nov. 4	Tom Craddick (inc)	Republican	21,770	100.0%	--Unopposed--				21,770	N/A
1988	General	Nov. 8	Tom Craddick (inc)	Republican	38,422	94.40%	Leonard Oth Carl	Lib.	2,288	5.60%	13,564	36,134
1990	General	Nov. 6	Tom Craddick (inc)	Republican	29,448	89.03%	Len Caryl	Lib.	3,630	10.97%	22,946	25,818

=== Texas House, 82nd district (1993–present) ===
==== 1992 ====
Craddick ran unopposed in the Republican primary, gaining 15,219 votes. This was the first election Craddick ran for the 82nd district. He then ran unopposed in the general election, winning 32,539 votes and re-election to a thirteenth term.

==== 1994 ====
Craddick ran unopposed in the Republican primary, gaining 8,024 votes. He then ran unopposed in the general election, winning 26,034 votes and re-election to a fourteenth term.

==== 1996 ====
Craddick ran unopposed in the Republican primary, gaining 13,289 votes. He then ran unopposed in the general election, winning 30,771 votes and re-election to a fifteenth term.

==== 1998 ====
Craddick ran unopposed in the Republican primary, gaining 8,329 votes. He then ran unopposed in the general election, winning 22,086 votes and re-election to a sixteenth term.

==== 2000 ====
Craddick ran unopposed in the Republican primary, gaining 16,007 votes. He then ran against Democrat Gilberto M. Garcia in the general election and won re-election to a seventeenth term.

2000 District 82 General Election
Party	Candidate	Votes	%
Republican	Tom Craddick	31,717	78.28%
Democratic	Gilberto M. Garcia	8,798	21.72%
Total votes		40,515	100.00%
Republican hold			

==== 2002 ====
Craddick ran unopposed in the Republican primary, gaining 5,651 votes. He then ran unopposed in the general election, winning 28,968 votes and re-election to an eighteenth term.

==== 2004 ====
Craddick ran unopposed in the Republican primary, gaining 10,076 votes. He then ran unopposed in the general election, winning 42,237 votes and re-election to a nineteenth term.

==== 2006 ====
Craddick ran unopposed in the Republican primary, gaining 5,439 votes. He then ran unopposed in the general election, winning 24,187 votes and re-election to a 20th term.

==== 2008 ====
Craddick ran unopposed in the Republican primary, gaining 11,962 votes. He then ran against Democrat Bill Dingus and Libertarian Sherry Phillips in the general election and won re-election to a 21st term.

2008 District 82 General Election
Party	Candidate	Votes	%
Republican	Tom Craddick	33,202	62.12%
Democratic	Bill Dingus	18,870	35.31%
Libertarian	Sherry Phillips	1,372	2.57%
Total votes		53,444	100.00%
Republican hold			

==== 2010 ====
Craddick ran unopposed in the Republican primary, gaining 11,555 votes. He then ran unopposed in the general election, winning 28,006 votes and re-election to a 22nd term.

==== 2012 ====
Craddick ran unopposed in the Republican primary, gaining 10,945 votes. He then ran unopposed in the general election, winning 42,572 votes and re-election to a 23rd term.

==== 2014 ====
Craddick ran unopposed in the Republican primary, gaining 13,129 votes. He then ran unopposed in the general election, winning 24,262 votes and re-election to a 24th term.

==== 2016 ====
Craddick ran unopposed in the Republican primary, gaining 20,819 votes. He then ran unopposed in the general election, winning 47,432 votes and re-election to a 25th term.

==== 2018 ====
Craddick ran unopposed in the Republican primary, winning 13,973 votes. He then ran against Democrat Spencer Bounds in the general election and won re-election to a 26th term.

2018 District 82 general election
Party	Candidate	Votes	%
Republican	Tom Craddick (incumbent)	39,030	80.13
Democratic	Spencer Bounds	9,677	19.87
Total votes		48,707	100.0
Republican hold			

==== 2020 ====
Craddick ran unopposed in the Republican primary, gaining 22,604 votes. He then ran unopposed in the general election, winning 61,068 votes and won re-election to a 27th term.

==== 2022 ====
Craddick ran unopposed in the Republican primary, gaining 13,643 votes. He then ran unopposed in the general election and won re-election to a 28th term.

==== 2024 ====
Craddick ran unopposed in the Republican primary, winning 15,128 votes. He then ran against Democrat Steven Schafersman and won re-election to a 29th term.

2024 District 82 general election
Party	Candidate	Votes	%
Republican	Tom Craddick (incumbent)	50,546	82.73%
Democratic	Steven Schafersman	10,555	17.27%
Total votes		61,101	100%
Republican hold			

==== 2026 ====
Craddick is running for re-election for a 30th term. He ran unopposed in the Republican primary election and won 13,631 votes.

2026 District 82 general election
Party	Candidate	Votes	%
Republican	Tom Craddick (incumbent)		
Democratic	Cathy Broadrick		
Total votes			100%

== See also ==
- 2003 Texas redistricting
- List of speakers of the Texas House of Representatives

Texas House of Representatives
Preceded by Frank Kell Cahoon	Member of the Texas House of Representatives from the 70th district January 14, 1969–January 9, 1973	Succeeded by Hilary B. Doran Jr.
Preceded by Ace Pickens	Member of the Texas House of Representatives from the 68th district January 9, 1973–January 11, 1983	Succeeded by Dudley Harrison
Preceded by Pete Laney	Member of the Texas House of Representatives from the 76th district January 11, 1983–January 12, 1993	Succeeded by Nancy McDonald
Preceded by Nolan Robnett	Member of the Texas House of Representatives from the 82nd district January 12, 1993–present	Incumbent
Political offices
Preceded by Pete Laney	Speaker of the Texas House of Representatives; January 14, 2003–January 13, 2009	Succeeded by Joe Straus
