= Pete Laney =

American politician

Speaker of the Texas House of Representatives
- In office January 12, 1993 – January 14, 2003
- Preceded by: Gib Lewis
- Succeeded by: Tom Craddick

Member of the Texas House of Representatives
- In office January 9, 1973 – January 9, 2007
- Preceded by: Delwin Jones
- Succeeded by: Joe Heflin
- Constituency: 76th district (1973–1983); 85th district (1983–2007)

Personal details
- Born: James Earl Laney; March 20, 1943 (age 83) Plainview, Texas, U.S.
- Party: Democratic
- Spouse: Nelda McQuien (died 2016)
- Children: 3
- Education: Texas Tech University
- Occupation: Farmer, businessman

James Earl "Pete" Laney (born March 20, 1943) is a former American politician. A member of the Democratic Party, he served in the Texas House of Representatives from 1973 to 2007. A resident of Hale Center, Texas, Laney served as the speaker of the Texas House of Representatives from 1993 to 2003; as of 2026, Laney is the most recent Democrat to serve in this role.

== Political life ==
During his tenure, Laney was cited by Republican Governor George W. Bush, during the 2000 presidential campaign, as a model of legislative bipartisan co-operation. Lewis triggered a speaker's race in 1991 when he announced, amid allegations of accepting an illegal gift from a law firm, that he would not seek re-election as speaker in 1993. Laney announced in November 1992 that he had secured the pledges of more than eighty of his colleagues to elect him speaker. In his first term as speaker, Laney was named by Texas Monthly magazine as one of the "Top Ten" legislators of the Seventy-third Texas Legislature.

Laney's tenure as speaker ended after the 2002 elections, when the GOP gained a majority in the Texas House for the first time since Reconstruction, and Tom Craddick of Midland was elected the first Republican speaker since 1871. Craddick served in the presiding post from 2003 to 2009. When Craddick undertook a mid-decade congressional redistricting, Laney joined fellow Democrats who traveled to Ardmore, Oklahoma, to block consideration of the Republicans' bill by denying the House a quorum.

No longer speaker, Laney was still re-elected in 2004 by defeating his Republican opponent with almost 59 percent of the vote in a district otherwise carried by the second President Bush with 76 percent of the vote. In December 2005, Laney announced he would not seek re-election to the House in 2006, after having served continuously since 1973. Democrats kept Laney's seat in 2006 with former Crosby County Judge Joseph P. Heflin, who defeated Jim Landtroop of Plainview.

== Personal life ==
Laney was born in Plainview to Wilber G. Laney (1918–2005) and the former Frances L. Wilson (1921–2000). He married the former Nelda Kay McQuien (1943–2016). They have three children and six grandchildren.

Texas House of Representatives
| Preceded by 76-1: Delwin Jones; 76-2: Elmer Tarbox; 76-3: R. B. McAlister | Member of the Texas House of Representatives from District 76 (Hale Center); 1973–1983 | Succeeded by Tom Craddick |
| Preceded by Al Edwards | Member of the Texas House of Representatives from District 85 (Hale Center); 1983–2007 | Succeeded by Joseph P. Heflin |
Political offices
| Preceded by Gib Lewis | Speaker of the Texas House of Representatives; 1993–2003 | Succeeded by Tom Craddick |
