= Buck Lansford =

American football player (born 1933)

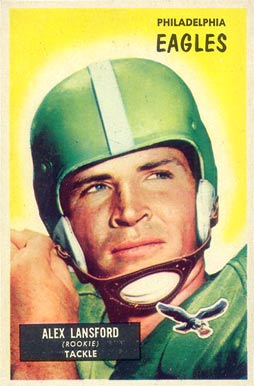
- Lansford on a 1955 Bowman football card

No. 79, 63
- Positions: Guard, tackle

Personal information
- Born: November 4, 1933 (age 93); Catarina, Texas, U.S.
- Listed height: 6 ft 2 in (1.88 m)
- Listed weight: 232 lb (105 kg)

Career information
- High school: Carrizo Springs (Carrizo Springs, Texas)
- College: Texas
- NFL draft: 1955: 2nd round, 22nd overall pick

Career history
- Philadelphia Eagles (1955–1957); Los Angeles Rams (1958–1960)

Awards and highlights
- Pro Bowl (1956); First-team All-SWC (1954)

Career NFL statistics
- Games played: 61
- Games started: 58
- Fumble recoveries: 1
- Stats at Pro Football Reference

Alex John "Buck" Lansford (born November 4, 1933) is an American former professional football player who was an offensive lineman in the National Football League (NFL) for the Philadelphia Eagles and the Los Angeles Rams. He was named to the Pro Bowl once. Lansford played college football for the Texas Longhorns and was selected in the second round of the 1955 NFL draft.

== High school and college career ==
Lansford played high school football at Carrizo Springs High School. After graduating, he attended the University of Texas at Austin and played as a tackle for them starting in 1951. His older brother, James "Longhorn Jim" Lansford, also played for the University of Texas. In 1952, Lansford played in the left tackle position. In 1953 he was nominated for the College Football All-America Team but was not ultimately selected. Lansford was made one of three team captains for the Texas Longhorns in 1954. That year, he was described as the "leed Steer" of Texas' offense and was again unsuccessfully nominated for the All-America team.

== Professional career ==
Lansford was selected 22nd overall by the Philadelphia Eagles in the second round of the 1955 NFL draft. He re-signed with the Eagles in 1956. That same year, he was selected to the 1956 Pro Bowl. In 1957 he was named an All-Pro player. The Eagles would not have another All-Pro offensive lineman until Jermane Mayberry in 2002. In 1958 Lansford and Jimmy Harris were traded to the Los Angeles Rams in exchange for quarterback Norm Van Brocklin. Lansford was made a captain on the Rams and played for the team through the 1960 season but quit the team partway through training camp in 1961 after a dispute over being made backup. As he was still under contract with the Rams, they attempted to arrange for him to be traded to the Dallas Cowboys but no deal was ultimately made. After three years absence from professional football, Lansford was signed to the Houston Oilers in August 1965. At the end of the month, Lansford announced his intention to formally retire and returned home to Lampasas, Texas.
