= National Register of Historic Places listings in Dimmit County, Texas =

Location of Dimmit County in Texas

This is a list of the National Register of Historic Places listings in Dimmit County, Texas.

This is intended to be a complete list of properties and districts listed on the National Register of Historic Places in Dimmit County, Texas. There are one district and two individual properties listed on the National Register in the county. All sites are Recorded Texas Historic Landmarks, and one site is also a State Antiquities Landmark.

== Current listings ==
This National Park Service list is complete through NPS recent listings posted March 21, 2025. The locations of National Register properties and districts may be seen in a mapping service provided.

	Name on the Register	Image	Date listed	Location	City or town	Description
1	Dimmit County Courthouse	Dimmit County Courthouse	August 14, 1984 (#84001652)	Public Square; 28°31′19″N 99°51′35″W	Carrizo Springs	State Antiquities Landmark, Recorded Texas Historic Landmark
2	Asher and Mary Isabelle Richardson House	Asher and Mary Isabelle Richardson House	November 22, 1988 (#88002539)	US 83; 28°26′31″N 99°45′44″W	Asherton	Recorded Texas Historic Landmark
3	Valenzuela Ranch Headquarters		July 18, 1985 (#85001562)	Valenzuela Creek; 28°13′52″N 99°40′39″W	Catarina	Recorded Texas Historic Landmark

== See also ==
- National Register of Historic Places listings in Texas
- Recorded Texas Historic Landmarks in Dimmit County
