= Brundage, Texas =

- Census-designated place
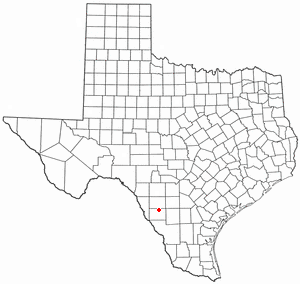
- Location of Brundage, Texas

- Coordinates: 28°35′43″N 99°39′45″W
- Country: United States
- State: Texas
- County: Dimmit

Area
  - Total: 0.62 sq mi (1.6 km^{2})
  - Land: 0.62 sq mi (1.6 km^{2})
  - Water: 0 sq mi (0.0 km^{2})
- Elevation: 535 ft (163 m)

Population (2020)
  - Total: 12
  - Density: 19/sq mi (7.5/km^{2})
- Time zone: UTC-6 (Central (CST))
  - Summer (DST): UTC-5 (CDT)
- ZIP code: 78834
- Area code: 830
- FIPS code: 48-10852
- GNIS feature ID: 1353013

Brundage is an unincorporated community and census-designated place (CDP) in Dimmit County, Texas, United States. The population was 12 at the 2020 census.

== Geography ==
Brundage is located in northeastern Dimmit County at 28°35′43″N 99°39′45″W (28.595243, -99.662611). Texas State Highway 85 passes through the community, leading west 12 miles (19 km) to Carrizo Springs, the county seat, and east 6 miles (10 km) to Big Wells.

According to the United States Census Bureau, the CDP has a total area of 0.62 square miles (1.6 km^{2}), all land.

== Demographics ==
Historical population
Census	Pop.	Note	%±
2000	31		—
2010	27		−12.9%
2020	12		−55.6%
U.S. Decennial Census; 1850–1900 1910; 1920 1930 1940; 1950 1960 1970; 1980 1990 2000; 2010 2020

=== 2020 census ===
Brundage CDP, Texas – Racial and ethnic composition Note: the US Census treats Hispanic/Latino as an ethnic category. This table excludes Latinos from the racial categories and assigns them to a separate category. Hispanics/Latinos may be of any race.
Race / Ethnicity (NH = Non-Hispanic)	Pop 2000	Pop 2010	Pop 2020	% 2000	% 2010	% 2020
White alone (NH)	6	20	0	19.35%	74.07%	0.00%
Black or African American alone (NH)	0	0	0	0.00%	0.00%	0.00%
Native American or Alaska Native alone (NH)	0	0	0	0.00%	0.00%	0.00%
Asian alone (NH)	0	0	0	0.00%	0.00%	0.00%
Native Hawaiian or Pacific Islander alone (NH)	0	0	0	0.00%	0.00%	0.00%
Other race alone (NH)	0	0	0	0.00%	0.00%	0.00%
Mixed race or Multiracial (NH)	0	0	0	0.00%	0.00%	0.00%
Hispanic or Latino (any race)	25	7	12	80.65%	25.93%	100.00%
Total	31	27	12	100.00%	100.00%	100.00%

=== 2000 census ===
As of the census of 2000, there were 31 people, 7 households, and 5 families residing in the CDP. The population density was 1.3 people per square mile (0.5/km^{2}). There were 14 housing units at an average density of 0.6/sq mi (0.2/km^{2}). The racial makeup of the CDP was 67.74% White, 29.03% from other races, and 3.23% from two or more races. Hispanic or Latino of any race were 80.65% of the population.

There were 7 households, out of which 14.3% had children under the age of 18 living with them, 42.9% were married couples living together, 28.6% had a female householder with no husband present, and 14.3% were non-families. 14.3% of all households were made up of individuals, and none had someone living alone who was 65 years of age or older. The average household size was 4.43 and the average family size was 5.00.

In the CDP, the population was spread out, with 38.7% under the age of 18, 12.9% from 18 to 24, 22.6% from 25 to 44, 22.6% from 45 to 64, and 3.2% who were 65 years of age or older. The median age was 22 years. For every 100 females, there were 93.8 males. For every 100 females age 18 and over, there were 137.5 males.

The median income for a household in the CDP was $13,750, and the median income for a family was $13,750. Males had a median income of $0 versus $0 for females. The per capita income for the CDP was $2,371. There were 100.0% of families and 100.0% of the population living below the poverty line, including 100.0% of under 18 and none of those over 65.

== Education ==
The CDP is served by the Carrizo Springs Consolidated Independent School District.
