= Cecilia Castellano =

American politician

Member-elect of the Texas House of Representatives from the 80th district
- Assuming office January 2027
- Succeeding: Don McLaughlin

Personal details
- Party: Democratic
- Spouse: Antonio Castellano
- Children: 2

Cecilia Castellano (born 1977/1978) is an American politician. She is the Democratic member-elect of the Texas House of Representatives from the 80th district. Prior to her victory, she was founder and CEO of construction company AZTECA Designs.

== Biography ==
=== Personal life and business career ===
Castellano was born in 1977 or 1978. She attended Texas A&M University–San Antonio. She has two children with her husband Antonio Castellano, as well as three grandchildren.

In March 2006, Castellano founded construction company AZTECA Designs, remaining president and CEO of the company as of 2026.

=== 2024 Texas House of Representatives election ===
Castellano ran in the 2024 Texas House of Representatives election in the 80th district. The retiring incumbent, Democrat Tracy King, ran unopposed in 2022 and represented the only district Greg Abbott won in his 2022 re-election that simultaneously elected a Democrat to the House. As such, the districts was seen as Republican's best opportunity to win a seat from the Democrats. After leading the Democratic primary with 27.1% of the vote, Castellano defeated Rosie Cuellar, the sister of U.S. Representative Henry Cuellar, in a runoff election, 57.9% to 42.1%.

In August, Castellano's house was searched as part of an investigation into alleged ballot harvesting led by attorney general Ken Paxton. Castellano denied the allegations and accused the investigations of being politically motivated. McLaughlin, who gained high name recognition due to his public response to the 2022 Robb Elementary School shooting, was seen as having a high chance to flip the district.

Castellano lost the general election in November 2026 to McLaughlin 40.5% to 59.5%.

=== 2026 Texas House of Representatives election ===
In December 2025, Castellano announced that she would make another run in District 80 for the 2026 Texas House of Representatives election. She named border security, economy, education, and infrastructure as legislative priorities. She won the Democratic primary in March 2026, defeating challenger Julie Hilberg 76.7% to 23.3%.

Castellano won the general election in November 2026, defeating McLaughlin 52.8% to 47.2%.
