= Texas State Highway 85 =

State highway in Texas

State Highway 85
- SH 85 highlighted in red

Route information
- Maintained by TxDOT
- Length: 76.926 mi (123.800 km)
- Existed: 1923–present

Major junctions
- West end: US 83 at Carrizo Springs
- I-35 at Dilley
- East end: SH 97 west of Charlotte

Location
- Country: United States
- State: Texas

Highway system
- Highways in Texas; Interstate; US; State; Former; Toll; Loops; Spurs; FM/RM; Park; Rec
← US 85	→ SH 86

State Highway 85 (SH 85) is a state highway in the U.S. state of Texas that runs almost 77 miles (124 km) from Carrizo Springs to Charlotte.

== History ==
SH 85 was originally designated on August 21, 1923 along a route from Eagle Pass to Dilley via Carrizo Springs. On February 17, 1925, it was extended to Del Rio. On September 28, 1950, the section from Del Rio to Carrizo Springs was transferred to newly extended U.S. Highway 277. SH 85 was extended along its current route to Charlotte on December 17, 1961.

== Route description ==
SH 85 begins at an intersection with US 83 in Carrizo Springs. The highway heads east from this junction and has an intersection with FM 1917 before leaving Carrizo Springs. East of the city, the highway heads to the northeast as it intersects FM 1556 and FM 1407 and passes near the Dimmit County Airport. The highway turns back towards the east before a crossing of the Nueces River. SH 85 turns back towards the northeast after the river crossing before turning back towards the east near Brundage, where it has an intersection with FM 65. The highway continues to the east as it heads towards Big Wells, where it intersects FM 1867. East of Big Wells, the highway once again turns towards the northeast near an intersection with FM 468. SH 85 curves towards the north-northeast before entering Frio County. Once in Frio County, the highway curves back to the east. It curves back towards the northeast as it approaches the city of Dilley. In Dilley, SH 85 has an interchange with I-35. Heading east from Dilley, the highway turns back towards the northeast before crossing the Frio River. SH 85 continues northeast to an intersection with FM 1582 before crossing into Atascosa County. The highway curves back to the east as it enters Atascosa County. The highway ends at SH 97 west of the city limits of Charlotte.

== Junction list ==
County	Location	mi	km	Destinations	Notes
Dimmit	Carrizo Springs	0.00	0.00	US 83 (1st Street)	
Dimmit	Carrizo Springs	0.48	0.77	FM 1917	
Dimmit		1.01	1.63	FM 1556	
Dimmit		1.64	2.64	FM 1407	
Dimmit		11.69	18.81	FM 190	
Dimmit		12.37	19.91	FM 65	
Dimmit	Big Wells	18.42	29.64	FM 1867 (Commerce Street)	
Dimmit		21.43	34.49	FM 468	
Frio	Dilley	43.71	70.34	I-35 – Laredo, San Antonio	I-35 exit 84.
Frio	Dilley	44.55	71.70	I-35 BL	
Frio		53.34	85.84	FM 1583	
Frio		58.66	94.40	FM 1582	
Atascosa		72.19	116.18	FM 140 west	West end of FM 140 overlap
Atascosa		76.25	122.71	FM 140 east	East end of FM 140 overlap
Atascosa		76.77	123.55	SH 97	
1.000 mi = 1.609 km; 1.000 km = 0.621 mi: Concurrency terminus
