= Timoteo Garza =

American politician

Member of the Texas House of Representatives from the 80th district
- In office January 14, 2003 – January 11, 2005
- Preceded by: Gary L. Walker
- Succeeded by: Tracy O. King

Personal details
- Party: Democratic

Timoteo Garza is an American politician. He was a former Democratic member of the Texas House of Representatives for the 80th district from 2003 to 2005.

== Election history ==
In 2002, incumbent Gary L. Walker did not file for re-election. Garza ran in the Democratic primary held on March 12, 2002 and advanced to a primary runoff against Tracy O. King. He won the runoff on April 9, 2002 with 51.92% of the vote, and defeated Republican Ben Martinez in the November 5, 2002 general election, winning 55.80% of the vote. He assumed office on January 14, 2003.

In 2004, Garza was defeated in the Democratic primary by Tracy O. King, who won 60.99% of the vote in the runoff, and later won the general election unopposed. Garza left office on January 11, 2005.

Texas House of Representatives
Preceded by Gary L. Walker	Member of the Texas House of Representatives from District 80 (Eagle Pass); 2003 – 2005	Succeeded by Tracy O. King
