= Pedro G. Nieto =

American attorney and politician

Member of the Texas House of Representatives from the 43rd district
- In office January 12, 1993 – January 10, 1995
- Preceded by: Henry Cuellar
- Succeeded by: Tracy King

Personal details
- Born: 1941 (age 84–85)
- Party: Republican (1993–present)
- Other political affiliations: Democratic (until 1993)
- Spouse: Annabelle Perez
- Children: 1
- Education: El Paso Community College; University of Texas at El Paso

Pedro Galindo Nieto, known as Pete Nieto (born c. 1941), is an attorney in Uvalde, Texas, who served a single term in the Texas House of Representatives in the former District 43 from 1993 until 1995. Nieto switched parties from Democrat to Republican in June 1993 after the close of that year's regular legislative session.

In addition to his own Uvalde, District 43 included Dimmit, Frio, La Salle, Medina, Webb, and Zavala counties.

Nieto was defeated for a second term in 1994 by the Democrat Tracy King of Batesville. King received 15,072 votes (61.8 percent) to Nieto's 9,321 (38.2 percent).

King still holds the House seat, now numbered District 80 in an altered configuration.
