= KAJP =

Carrizo Springs, Texas; United States
- Frequency: 93.5 MHz

Programming
- Format: Defunct

Ownership
- Owner: Roberto Gonzalez; (MBM Radio Laredo LLC)

History
- First air date: 2009

Technical information
- Licensing authority: FCC
- Facility ID: 164179
- Class: A
- ERP: 6,000 watts
- HAAT: 77.0 meters (252.6 ft)
- Transmitter coordinates: 28°30′32″N 99°52′37″W

Links
- Public license information: Public file; LMS

KAJP (93.5 FM) was a radio station licensed to Carrizo Springs, Texas, United States. The station was owned by Roberto Gonzalez, through licensee MBM Radio Laredo LLC.

KAJP suspended operations on December 7, 2015 for financial reasons. On December 5, 2016, MBM Radio Laredo surrendered the station's license to the Federal Communications Commission (FCC). The FCC cancelled KAJP's license on December 19, 2016.
