= Asherton Independent School District =

School district in Texas

Location
- Asherton, Dimmit County, Texas; United States

District information
- Closed: 1999 (became part of Carrizo Springs Consolidated Independent School District)

Students and staff
- Students: 364 (1999)

Asherton Independent School District was a public school district based in the community of Asherton, Texas (USA).

The community is located along the Mexico–United States border, southwest of San Antonio.

The district existed until 1999, when it was ordered to consolidate with Carrizo Springs schools by the Texas Education Agency (TEA) to form the Carrizo Springs Consolidated Independent School District. The TEA determined that the Asherton ISD had not followed proper procedures in assessing school property taxes, which was the basis for its closure. TEA officials stated that "financial instability/insolvency" was the reason behind the district's dissolution.

The Carrizo Springs district moved all students in grades 7-12 into its existing junior high and high schools, but left the Asherton school open to serve grades PreK-6.

== District enrollment (1988-1999) ==
- 1988-89 - 419 students
- 1989-90 - 414 students
- 1990-91 - 474 students
- 1991-92 - 444 students
- 1992-93 - 436 students
- 1993-94 - 430 students
- 1994-95 - 401 students
- 1995-96 - 388 students
- 1996-97 - 392 students
- 1997-98 - 365 students
- 1998-99 - 364 students

The ethnic composition of Asherton ISD in its final year of operation (1998–99) was 98% Hispanic, 1% White, and 1% African American. Of the 364 students, 330 (90.7%) were considered economically disadvantaged.

== Student performance ==
Asherton ISD's performance on the Texas Assessment of Academic Skills (TAAS), a state standardized test used from 1991 to 2003, generally met state standards. The elementary and high school campuses consistently received ratings of "Acceptable" based on the number of students passing each section of the TAAS test. The district received a separate rating of "Academically Unacceptable: Special Accreditation Investigation (SAI)" in its final four years of operation. Unlike an "Academically Unacceptable" rating, that was designated for districts with low student test performance, "Academically Unacceptable: SAI" ratings were based on problems in governance, finances, testing practice, compliance with federal regulation, and/or administrative management.
