= John Ayers =

American football player (1953–1995)

No. 68, 67
- Position: Offensive guard

Personal information
- Born: April 14, 1953; Carrizo Springs, Texas, U.S.
- Died: October 2, 1995 (aged 42); Canyon, Texas, U.S.
- Listed height: 6 ft 5 in (1.96 m)
- Listed weight: 258 lb (117 kg)

Career information
- High school: Carrizo Springs
- College: West Texas A&M
- NFL draft: 1976: 8th round, 233rd overall pick

Career history
- San Francisco 49ers (1977–1986); Denver Broncos (1987)

Awards and highlights
- 2× Super Bowl champion (XVI, XIX); First-team All-Pro (1984); Second-team All-Pro (1985)

Career NFL statistics
- Games played: 157
- Games started: 137
- Fumble recoveries: 3
- Stats at Pro Football Reference

John Milton Ayers (April 14, 1953 – October 2, 1995) was an American professional football guard in the National Football League (NFL) from 1977 through 1987. During that span, he appeared in two Super Bowls: Super Bowl XVI and Super Bowl XIX for the San Francisco 49ers. Ayers was a key contributor on the final 89-yard drive that led to the play that has been immortalized as "The Catch" in the 1982 NFC Playoffs versus the Dallas Cowboys.

John Ayers played college football for the West Texas A&M Buffaloes. He was also a member of the 1987 Denver Broncos team that lost Super Bowl XXII, but did not appear in that game.

== Death ==
Ayers was diagnosed with liver cancer and died on October 2, 1995.

== Personal life ==
Ayers also served for a brief period as the figurehead President of Bill Watts' Universal Wrestling Federation.

His daughter, Jolee, was a scholarship basketball player at Texas Tech University. His grandson, John Curry, is a college football linebacker at Texas Tech.
