= Asher and Mary Isabelle Richardson House =

Historic house in Texas, United States

- U.S. National Register of Historic Places
- Recorded Texas Historic Landmark
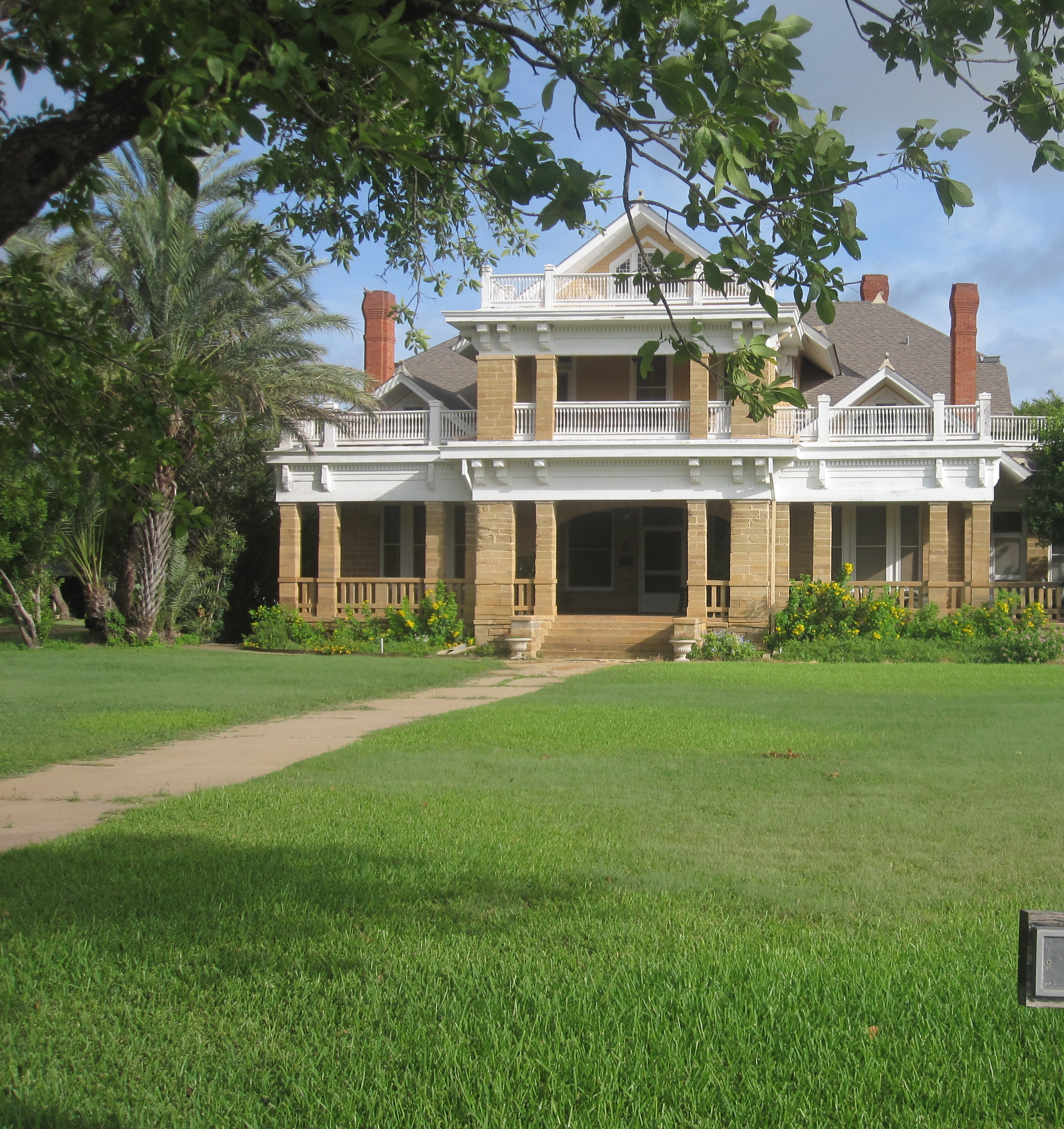
- Asher and Mary Isabelle Richardson House

- Location within Texas Location within the United States
- Location: US 83; Asherton, Texas
- Coordinates: 28°26′31″N 99°45′44″W
- Area: 8.7 acres (3.5 ha)
- Built: 1909
- Architect: Alfred Giles
- Architectural style: Prairie School; Beaux-Arts
- NRHP reference No.: 88002539
- RTHL No.: 355

Significant dates
- Added to NRHP: November 22, 1988
- Designated RTHL: 1990

The 1911 Asher and Mary Isabelle Richardson House is located on U.S. Highway 83 in the Dimmit County community of Asherton in the U.S. state of Texas. The southeast-facing home is also known as Bel-Asher, deriving the "Bel" from "Isabelle". It was added to the National Register of Historic Places listings in Dimmit County, Texas in 1988. It was designated a Recorded Texas Historic Landmark in 1980.

Asher Richardson (1855–1914) was a Dimmit County rancher and horticulturist who founded Asherton, Texas. A native of Snow Hill, Maryland, Richardson settled in Dimmit County after his 1877 discharge from the United States Army. In 1881, Richardson and Mary Isabelle Votaw (1865–1941) were married in Bexar County.

Richardson contracted with San Antonio architect Alfred Giles to design the two-story family home as the centerpiece of Asherton. The Beaux-Arts and Prairie School style house was constructed of hand-cut local sandstone and features large projecting eaves. The interior of the house features brick fireplaces. Richardson's focus on fire safety possibly influenced the design of two doors on each room. A barn and cottage are situated behind the main house. The home has remained in the family and is not open to the public.

== See also ==
- National Register of Historic Places listings in Dimmit County, Texas
