= Big Wells, Texas =

- City
- Interactive map of Big Wells, Texas
- Coordinates: 28°34′15″N 99°34′13″W
- Country: United States
- State: Texas
- County: Dimmit

Government
  - Mayor: Jesus G. Ponce
  - City Administrator: Edward Flores

Area
  - Total: 0.56 sq mi (1.44 km^{2})
  - Land: 0.56 sq mi (1.44 km^{2})
  - Water: 0 sq mi (0.00 km^{2})
- Elevation: 522 ft (159 m)

Population (2020)
  - Total: 483
  - Density: 869/sq mi (335/km^{2})
- Time zone: UTC-6 (Central (CST))
  - Summer (DST): UTC-5 (CDT)
- ZIP code: 78830
- Area code: 830
- FIPS code: 48-08260
- GNIS feature ID: 2409847

Big Wells is a city in Dimmit County, Texas, United States. The population was 483 at the 2020 census, down from 697 at the 2010 census.

== Geography ==
Big Wells is located in northeastern Dimmit County at 28°34′15″N 99°34′13″W (28.570970, –99.570399). Texas State Highway 85 passes through the community, leading east 26 miles (42 km) to Dilley and Interstate 35, and west 18 miles (29 km) to Carrizo Springs, the Dimmit County seat.

According to the United States Census Bureau, the city of Big Wells has a total area of 0.54 square miles (1.4 km^{2}), all land.

== Demographics ==
Historical population
Census	Pop.	Note	%±
1940	866		—
1950	1,077		24.4%
1960	801		−25.6%
1970	711		−11.2%
1980	939		32.1%
1990	756		−19.5%
2000	704		−6.9%
2010	697		−1.0%
2020	483		−30.7%
U.S. Decennial Census

=== 2020 census ===
As of the 2020 census, Big Wells had a population of 483 people, 157 households, and 154 families residing in the city.

The median age was 37.6 years, 29.6% of residents were under the age of 18, and 20.1% of residents were 65 years of age or older. For every 100 females there were 93.2 males, and for every 100 females age 18 and over there were 96.5 males.

Of the 157 households, 33.1% had children under the age of 18 living in them, 35.7% were married couples living together, 19.7% were households with a male householder and no spouse or partner present, and 36.3% were households with a female householder and no spouse or partner present. About 27.3% of all households were made up of individuals and 14.1% had someone living alone who was 65 years of age or older.

There were 261 housing units, of which 39.8% were vacant. Among occupied housing units, 87.3% were owner-occupied and 12.7% were renter-occupied. The homeowner vacancy rate was 2.1% and the rental vacancy rate was 48.9%.

0% of residents lived in urban areas, while 100.0% lived in rural areas.

Racial composition as of the 2020 census
Race	Percent
White	45.5%
Black or African American	1.0%
American Indian and Alaska Native	1.0%
Asian	0%
Native Hawaiian and Other Pacific Islander	0%
Some other race	15.7%
Two or more races	36.6%
Hispanic or Latino (of any race)	93.4%

=== 2000 census ===
As of the census of 2000, there were 704 people, 244 households, and 182 families residing in the city. The population density was 1,268.1 inhabitants per square mile (489.6/km^{2}). There were 302 housing units at an average density of 544.0 per square mile (210.0/km^{2}). The racial makeup of the city was 79.26% White, 0.28% African American, 1.85% Native American, 0.43% Asian, 15.48% from other races, and 2.70% from two or more races. Hispanic or Latino of any race were 89.63% of the population.

There were 244 households, out of which 31.1% had children under the age of 18 living with them, 51.2% were married couples living together, 18.0% had a female householder with no husband present, and 25.4% were non-families. 23.0% of all households were made up of individuals, and 12.7% had someone living alone who was 65 years of age or older. The average household size was 2.87 and the average family size was 3.32.

In the city, the population was spread out, with 30.7% under the age of 18, 5.8% from 18 to 24, 20.9% from 25 to 44, 26.1% from 45 to 64, and 16.5% who were 65 years of age or older. The median age was 40 years. For every 100 females, there were 89.8 males. For every 100 females age 18 and over, there were 86.3 males.

The median income for a household in the city was $15,208, and the median income for a family was $17,381. Males had a median income of $13,750 versus $12,344 for females. The per capita income for the city was $6,594. About 38.3% of families and 43.6% of the population were below the poverty line, including 55.7% of those under age 18 and 33.0% of those age 65 or over.

== Education ==
The city is served by the Carrizo Springs Consolidated Independent School District.

Big Wells is served by:

- Big Wells Elementary School (PreK–2)
- Carrizo Springs Elementary (3–6)
- Carrizo Springs Junior High School (7–8)
- Carrizo Springs High School (9–12)
