= Jim Lansford =

American football player (1930–1989)

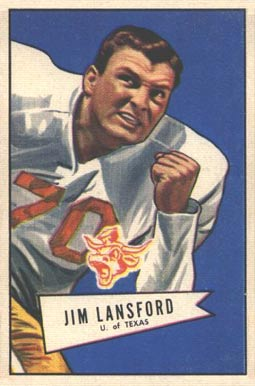
- Lansford on a 1952 Bowman football card

No. 71
- Position: Offensive tackle

Personal information
- Born: August 19, 1930; Jackson County, Texas
- Died: January 17, 1989 (aged 58); Galveston, Texas, U.S.
- Listed height: 6 ft 3 in (1.91 m)
- Listed weight: 235 lb (107 kg)

Career information
- High school: Carrizo Springs (Carrizo Springs, Texas)
- College: Texas
- NFL draft: 1952: 9th round, 98th overall pick

Career history
- Dallas Texans (1952)

Career NFL statistics
- Games played: 12
- Games started: 12
- Fumble recoveries: 1
- Stats at Pro Football Reference

James Albert "Longhorn Jim" Lansford (August 19, 1930 – January 17, 1989) was a professional American football offensive lineman in the National Football League who played one season for the Dallas Texans (1952). Prior to that he played three years of college football at Texas. While at Texas, he played in the 1951 Cotton Bowl.

He was an accomplished athlete who played football, baseball, basketball and track at Carrizo Springs High School.

While at Texas he earned a B.S. and a Master's degree in physical education.
