= Carrizo Hill, Texas =

- CDP
- Coordinates: 28°30′12″N 99°49′40″W
- Country: United States
- State: Texas
- County: Dimmit

Area
  - Total: 0.50 sq mi (1.3 km^{2})
  - Land: 0.50 sq mi (1.3 km^{2})
  - Water: 0 sq mi (0.0 km^{2})
- Elevation: 630 ft (190 m)

Population (2020)
  - Total: 550
  - Density: 1,100/sq mi (420/km^{2})
- Time zone: UTC-6 (Central (CST))
  - Summer (DST): UTC-5 (CDT)
- FIPS code: 48-12982
- GNIS feature ID: 1852691

Carrizo Hill is a census-designated place (CDP) in Dimmit County, in the U.S. state of Texas, United States. The population was 550 at the 2020 census.

== History ==
The town was established in 2000.

== Geography ==
Carrizo Hill is located at 28°30′12″N 99°49′40″W (28.503386, -99.827670).

According to the United States Census Bureau, the CDP has a total area of 0.5 square miles (1.3 km^{2}), all land.

The community is located on US Route 83 and is adjacent to the Dimmit County Airport.

== Demographics ==
Historical population
Census	Pop.	Note	%±
2000	548		—
2010	582		6.2%
2020	550		−5.5%
U.S. Decennial Census; 1850–1900 1910; 1920 1930 1940; 1950 1960 1970; 1980 1990 2000; 2010 2020

Carrizo Hill first appeared as a census designated place in the 2000 U.S. census.

=== 2020 census ===
Carrizo Hill CDP, Texas – Racial and ethnic composition Note: the US Census treats Hispanic/Latino as an ethnic category. This table excludes Latinos from the racial categories and assigns them to a separate category. Hispanics/Latinos may be of any race.
Race / Ethnicity (NH = Non-Hispanic)	Pop 2000	Pop 2010	Pop 2020	% 2000	% 2010	% 2020
White alone (NH)	28	25	22	5.11%	4.30%	4.00%
Black or African American alone (NH)	3	1	0	0.55%	0.17%	0.00%
Native American or Alaska Native alone (NH)	4	0	0	0.73%	0.00%	0.00%
Asian alone (NH)	2	0	0	0.36%	0.00%	0.00%
Native Hawaiian or Pacific Islander alone (NH)	0	0	0	0.00%	0.00%	0.00%
Other race alone (NH)	0	0	0	0.00%	0.00%	0.00%
Mixed race or Multiracial (NH)	0	0	0	0.00%	0.00%	0.00%
Hispanic or Latino (any race)	511	556	528	93.25%	95.53%	96.00%
Total	548	582	550	100.00%	100.00%	100.00%

=== 2000 census ===
As of the census of 2000, there were 548 people, 154 households, and 135 families residing in the CDP. The population density was 1,131.1 inhabitants per square mile (436.7/km^{2}). There were 185 housing units at an average density of 381.9 per square mile (147.5/km^{2}). The racial makeup of the CDP was 82.30% White, 0.55% African American, 0.73% Native American, 0.36% Asian, 14.23% from other races, and 1.82% from two or more races. Hispanic or Latino of any race were 93.25% of the population.

There were 154 households, out of which 57.1% had children under the age of 18 living with them, 71.4% were married couples living together, 11.0% had a female householder with no husband present, and 11.7% were non-families. 9.7% of all households were made up of individuals, and 5.2% had someone living alone who was 65 years of age or older. The average household size was 3.56 and the average family size was 3.82.

In the CDP, the population was spread out, with 39.4% under the age of 18, 10.2% from 18 to 24, 25.0% from 25 to 44, 20.3% from 45 to 64, and 5.1% who were 65 years of age or older. The median age was 26 years. For every 100 females, there were 106.0 males. For every 100 females age 18 and over, there were 93.0 males.

The median income for a household in the CDP was $14,167, and the median income for a family was $17,273. Males had a median income of $23,750 versus $14,861 for females. The per capita income for the CDP was $22,860. About 50.8% of families and 42.6% of the population were below the poverty line, including 29.1% of those under age 18 and 66.7% of those age 65 or over.

== Education ==
Carrizo Hill is served by the Carrizo Springs Independent School District.
