= Las Vegas, Texas =

Las Vegas
- Ghost town
- Interactive map of Las Vegas
- Location within Texas Las Vegas (the United States)
- Coordinates: 28°32′53″N 99°29′23″W
- Country: United States
- State: Texas
- County: Dimmit County

Las Vegas is a ghost town located on the old San Antonio, Uvalde and Gulf Railroad in northeastern Dimmit County, Texas, United States.

== History ==
The community was settled as a small rural community and received its first post office in 1913. It then experienced brief extensive urban development between during the 1910s. In 1915, when the community's population was 50, Las Vegas became the first site in Dimmit County to be prospected for oil. The community's post office was abandoned in 1917, and only a residence remains during around 1945.
