= Asherton, Texas =

- City
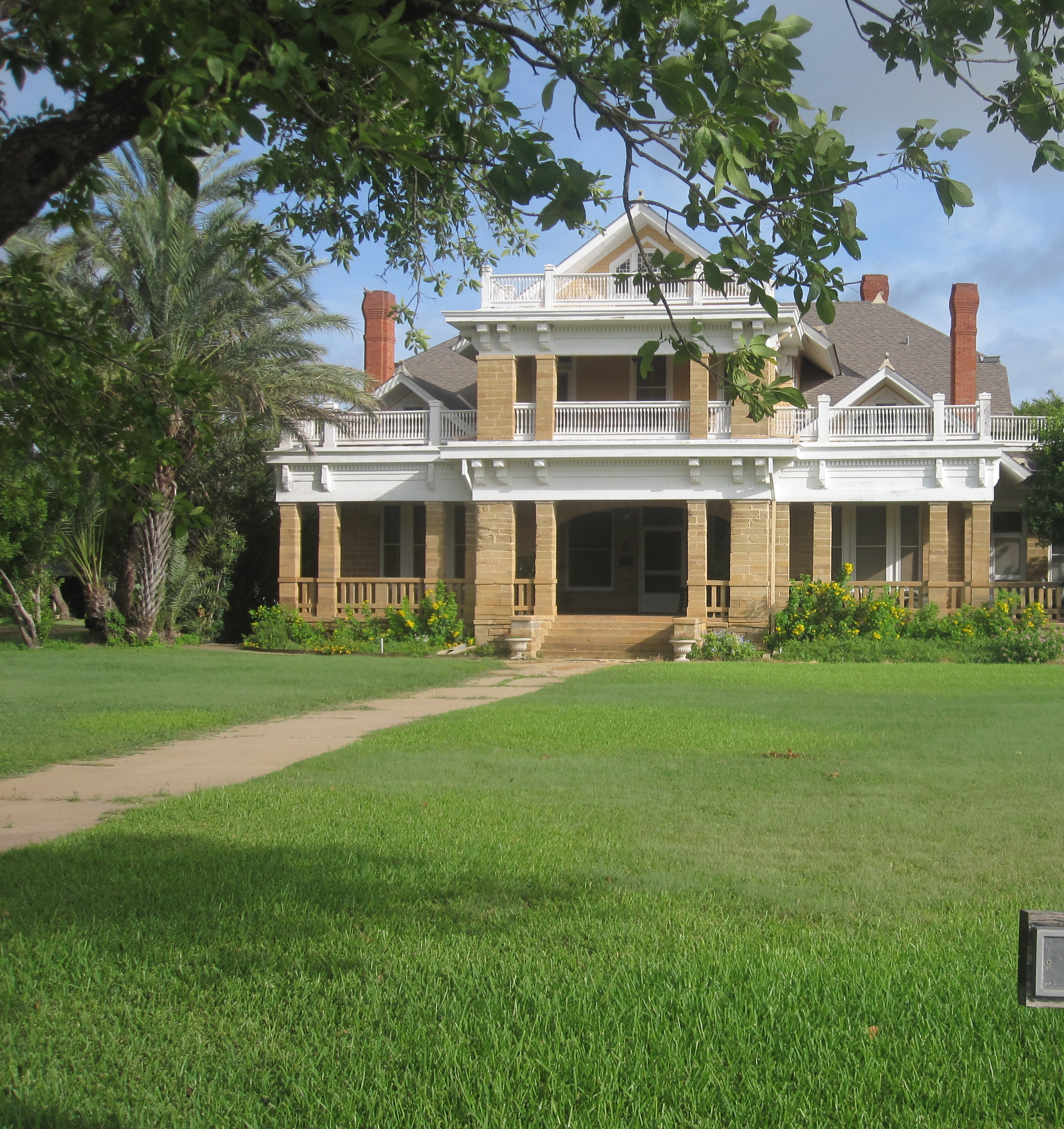
- Bel-Asher House in Asherton
- Interactive map of Asherton, Texas
- Coordinates: 28°26′50″N 99°45′41″W
- Country: United States
- State: Texas
- County: Dimmit

Area
  - Total: 0.81 sq mi (2.11 km^{2})
  - Land: 0.81 sq mi (2.11 km^{2})
  - Water: 0 sq mi (0.00 km^{2})
- Elevation: 532 ft (162 m)

Population (2020)
  - Total: 722
  - Density: 886/sq mi (342/km^{2})
- Time zone: UTC-6 (Central (CST))
  - Summer (DST): UTC-5 (CDT)
- ZIP code: 78827
- Area code: 830
- FIPS code: 48-04300
- GNIS feature ID: 2409739

Asherton, known colloquially as Cheto, is a city in Dimmit County, Texas, United States. The population was 722 at the 2020 census, down from 1,084 at the 2010 census. U.S. Highway 83 passes through Asherton.

== Geography ==
Asherton is located at the center of Dimmit County at 28°26′50″N 99°45′41″W (28.447159, –99.761504). It is on the east side of El Moro Creek, a northeastward-flowing tributary of the Nueces River. U.S. Highway 83 leads northwest 8 miles (13 km) to Carrizo Springs, the county seat, and south 72 miles (116 km) to Laredo.

According to the United States Census Bureau, Asherton has a total area of 0.81 square miles (2.1 km^{2}), all land.

== Demographics ==
Historical population
Census	Pop.	Note	%±
1930	1,858		—
1940	1,538		−17.2%
1950	2,425		57.7%
1960	1,890		−22.1%
1970	1,645		−13.0%
1980	1,574		−4.3%
1990	1,608		2.2%
2000	1,342		−16.5%
2010	1,084		−19.2%
2020	722		−33.4%
U.S. Decennial Census

=== 2020 census ===
As of the 2020 census, Asherton had a population of 722, 299 households, and 199 families. The median age was 47.9 years; 19.9% of residents were under the age of 18 and 24.8% of residents were 65 years of age or older. For every 100 females there were 91.5 males, and for every 100 females age 18 and over there were 93.3 males age 18 and over.

0% of residents lived in urban areas, while 100.0% lived in rural areas.

Of all households, 28.4% had children under the age of 18 living in them. Of all households, 39.1% were married-couple households, 20.1% were households with a male householder and no spouse or partner present, and 36.5% were households with a female householder and no spouse or partner present. About 30.8% of all households were made up of individuals and 18.1% had someone living alone who was 65 years of age or older.

There were 390 housing units, of which 23.3% were vacant. Among occupied housing units, 77.6% were owner-occupied and 22.4% were renter-occupied. The homeowner vacancy rate was <0.1% and the rental vacancy rate was 33.7%.

Racial composition as of the 2020 census
Race	Percent
White	30.6%
Black or African American	0.1%
American Indian and Alaska Native	0.1%
Asian	0%
Native Hawaiian and Other Pacific Islander	0.3%
Some other race	15.5%
Two or more races	53.3%
Hispanic or Latino (of any race)	96.3%

=== 2000 census ===
As of the census of 2000, there were 1,342 people, 428 households, and 341 families residing in the city. The population density was 1,609.6 inhabitants per square mile (621.5/km^{2}). There were 535 housing units at an average density of 641.7 per square mile (247.8/km^{2}). The racial makeup of the city was 75.56% White, 0.15% African American, 0.15% Native American, 0.07% Asian, 21.39% from other races, and 2.68% from two or more races. Hispanic or Latino of any race were 94.78% of the population.

There were 428 households, out of which 42.8% had children under the age of 18 living with them, 56.8% were married couples living together, 18.5% had a female householder with no husband present, and 20.3% were non-families. 18.9% of all households were made up of individuals, and 11.2% had someone living alone who was 65 years of age or older. The average household size was 3.13 and the average family size was 3.62.

In the city, the population was spread out, with 35.2% under the age of 18, 7.6% from 18 to 24, 23.6% from 25 to 44, 20.8% from 45 to 64, and 12.8% who were 65 years of age or older. The median age was 31 years. For every 100 females, there were 87.7 males. For every 100 females age 18 and over, there were 83.2 males.

The median income for a household in the city was $20,417, and the median income for a family was $24,107. Males had a median income of $23,281 versus $17,500 for females. The per capita income for the city was $7,746. About 29.9% of families and 35.8% of the population were below the poverty line, including 40.8% of those under age 18 and 41.8% of those age 65 or over.

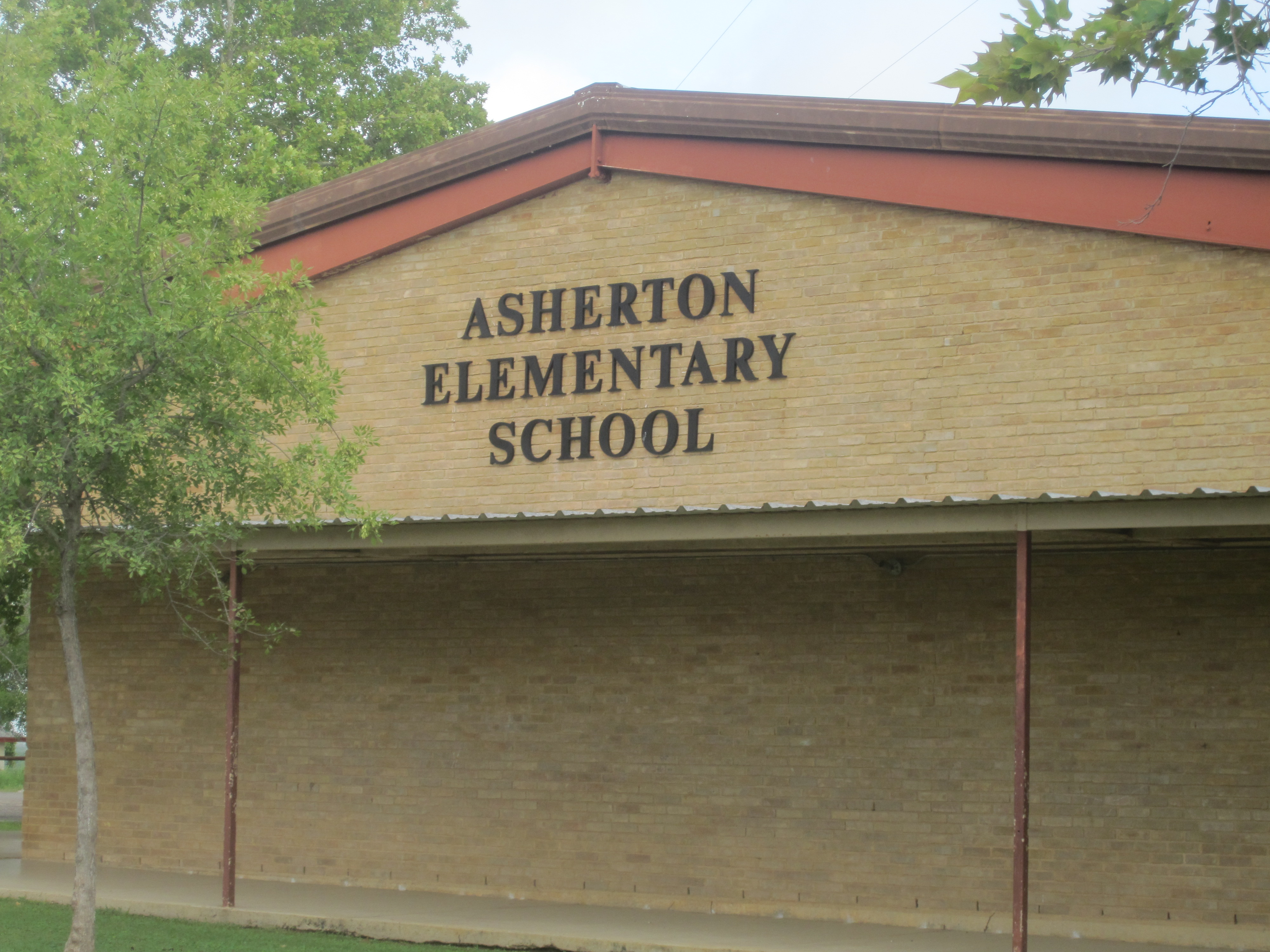
Asherton Elementary School; older students attend high school in Carrizo Springs.

== Education ==
Public education in Asherton is provided by the Carrizo Springs Consolidated Independent School District.

Schools that serve Asherton include:

- Asherton Elementary School (PreK–6)
- Carrizo Springs Junior High School (7–8)
- Carrizo Springs High School (9–12)

Prior to July 1, 1999, the Asherton Independent School District served Asherton. AISD was forced to close because of concerns about taxation.
