= Don McLaughlin =

American politician

Member of the Texas House of Representatives from the 80th district
- Incumbent
- Assumed office January 14, 2025
- Preceded by: Tracy King

Mayor of Uvalde
- In office June 3, 2014 – July 14, 2023
- Preceded by: J. Allen Carnes
- Succeeded by: Cody Smith

Personal details
- Born: Donald Edward McLaughlin Jr. September 20, 1961 (age 65) Austin, Texas, U.S.
- Party: Republican
- Spouse: Karen
- Children: 2
- Education: Angelo State University; Texas State University
- Occupation: Businessman; politician

Donald Edward McLaughlin Jr. (born September 20, 1961) is an American businessman and politician who is a member of the Texas House of Representatives from the 80th district. A Republican, he previously served as mayor of Uvalde from 2014 to 2024, and was in office during the Uvalde school shooting in 2022.

== Early life ==
McLaughlin was born on September 20, 1961 in Austin, Texas to Don McLaughlin Sr., a football star at the University of Texas, and Barbara Ann Neal, who was a winner of Miss Travis County. His parents had married a mere six days after their first date. When McLaughlin was a toddler, the family moved to Uvalde, Texas where his father was a football coach and worked in the pipe business. McLaughlin attended Texas State University and then Angelo State University before returning to Uvalde prior to graduation to work with his father. In 2000, McLaughlin and his father opened DKM Enterprises, which is a pipe business with 92 employees.

== Mayor of Uvalde ==
In 2014, McLaughlin was recruited for a Uvalde mayor run by the Uvalde Chamber of Commerce in an effort to make the city more "business friendly". Following a successful election, McLaughlin was sworn in on June 3, 2014 to a two-year term as mayor of Uvalde, Texas, the county seat of Uvalde County which is located about 80 miles west of San Antonio and 54 miles from the Mexico–United States border, succeeding J. Allen Carnes. He was re-elected unopposed in 2016 and 2018 to two year terms, and was elected to a four-year term in 2020, defeating former Uvalde mayor George Garza by 915 votes.

During his mayorship, McLaughlin, a Republican, made several media appearances on Fox News. In September 2021, he appeared on Tucker Carlson Tonight and described the Biden administration's border policies a "clown show", and he has also expressed on the network that the Hispanic community, which composes 72% of Uvalde's population, was "fed up" with Title 42. McLaughlin has been critical of Texas Governor Greg Abbott, calling him a "fraud" on the website The Texan, and endorsed Abbott's 2022 Republican primary opponent Don Huffines. He also has been critical of Senator Ted Cruz and Senator John Cornyn because he has had trouble contacting them as an elected official.

=== Uvalde school shooting ===
McLaughlin was serving as mayor of Uvalde when a shooting occurred at an Uvalde elementary school, on May 24, 2022. During the attack, 18-year-old Salvador Ramos fatally shot 19 students and 2 teachers in what would become the deadliest school shooting in Texas history.

In an interview with The Washington Post, McLaughlin said he frantically rushed to Hillcrest Funeral Home, located across the street from Robb Elementary School, where the shooting occurred, about 15 minutes after the first 9-1-1 call was made. Upon arrival, he describes having encountered a negotiator who was trying to call the shooter on the phone to no avail. McLaughlin reports not having known about the 9-1-1 calls being made by children in the school nor did he hear gunshots from his location across the street.

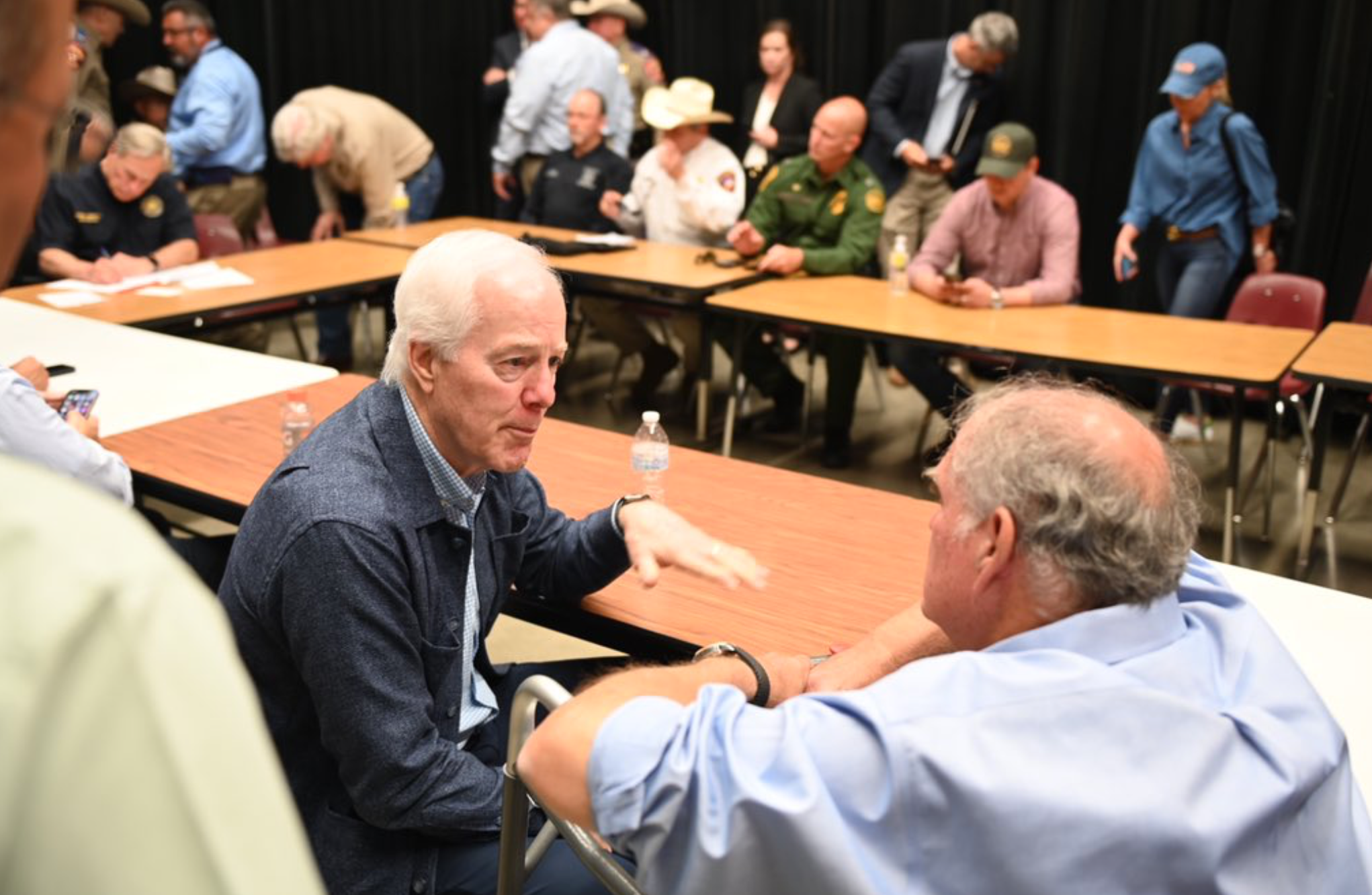
McLaughlin (right) with Senator John Cornyn (left) in May 2022 following the shooting

Following the shooting, McLaughlin appeared on Good Morning America and said that the issue was with mental health and not gun control; he said, "the city donated land. We’ve been trying to get this mental health hospital built here," but added, "when we have kids that are suicidal or kids that have thoughts like this or even adults, we have no place to take them."

The day after the shooting a press conference, which included McLaughlin, Governor Greg Abbott, Senator Ted Cruz, Senator John Cornyn, Lieutenant Governor Dan Patrick, and other officials, was held at Uvalde High School about the violent attack. Beto O'Rourke, a Democratic gubernatorial candidate who was challenging Abbott in the upcoming election, approached the stage and confronted Governor Abbott and other officials while Abbott was wrapping up his opening remarks about the shooting. O'Rourke accused Abbott of inaction on gun violence, saying "the time to stop the next shooting is right now and you are doing nothing" along with other remarks. Those on stage shouted him down, and O'Rourke received a mix of boos and cheers from the crowd. McLaughlin shouted at O'Rourke, “I can’t believe you’re a sick son of a bitch that would come to a deal like this to make a political issue". O'Rourke yelled toward the stage, "It's on you", and McLaughlin retorted, "It’s on assholes like you. Why don’t you get out of here". O'Rourke was then escorted out by security.

In July 2023, McLaughlin criticized local media releasing surveillance footage of the shooting before parents could see it. He described the situation as "one of the most chicken things I’ve ever seen".

McLaughlin has been critical of the state's response to the shooting and has accused the Texas Department of Public Safety, including its director Stephen McCraw, of providing a one-sided and incomplete account, in order to scapegoat local law enforcement as part of a coverup of the state's response. In 2022, a report was released by the Advanced Law Enforcement Rapid Response Training Center (ALERRT) at Texas State University saying that a Uvalde city police officer had the shooter in his crosshair, but waited to gain permission from a supervisor, who either did not hear the request or responded to late. McLaughlin subsequently released a statement saying that "no Uvalde police officers had any opportunity to take a shot at the gunman"; furthermore, he added, a "Uvalde Police Department officer saw someone outside but was unsure of who he saw and observed children in the area as well" and that it "ultimately, it was a coach with children on the playground, not the shooter". McLaughlin has said that DPS officers were already on scene when the gunman entered the classroom where the victims were killed and stated, "the May 24 Department of Public Safety (DPS)/Texas Rangers investigation is a disservice to families who lost children or parents because the true facts need to come out once all investigations/reviews, which the City expects will be thorough and fair, are complete". A later legislative report found no evidence for the claim made about the Uvalde Police Department.

In 2023, McLaughlin called District Attorney Christina Mitchell to resign and filed a lawsuit accusing her of blocking the city's investigation into the shooting.

== Texas House of Representatives ==
On July 14, 2023, McLaughlin announced he was resigning from his office as mayor to run for district 80 of the Texas House of Representatives soon after incumbent Tracy King, a moderate Democrat, announced his retirement. McLaughlin described his decision to run as a "no brainer" and added, "out of touch members of the establishment class have been ignoring the concerns of everyday Texans". Issues he cited as important to him were property tax relief, school choice, border security, and land ownership by noncitizens. His campaign was backed by Donald Trump and Abbott. McLaughlin attended the 2024 Republican National Convention in Milwaukee, Wisconsin as a delegate, voting for Trump and approving the party platform.

McLaughlin would go on to defeat Democratic challenger Cecilia Castellano by a wide margin. Since he has aligned himself with the most rightward wing of the Texas GOP, McLaughlin's victory was seen as another vote for Abbott's private school voucher plan and another vote against then-Speaker Dade Phelan.

McLaughlin's state legislative career was formed in the foreshadow of Uvalde shooting; as such, among his first legislative proposal's was a bill he dubbed the "Uvalde Strong Act" which is aimed toward addressing law enforcement shortcomings on that day. In contrast to his predecessor Tracy King, McLaughlin opposes raising the age to purchase semi-automatic rifles from 18 to 21. The Uvalde Strong Act passed and went into law in September 2025. The bill established new training and protocols for law enforcement response to active school shootings.

In 2026, McLaughlin lost a rematch with Castellano.

== Personal life ==
McLauglin and his wife of over 30 years, Karen, have two adult sons, and are active church-goers. He lives in Uvalde.
