= Carrizo Springs Consolidated Independent School District =

School district in Texas, United States

Location
- Carrizo Springs, Texas; United States

Other information
- Website: www.cscisd.net

Carrizo Springs Consolidated Independent School District is a school district headquartered in Carrizo Springs, Texas (US).

CSCISD serves all of Dimmit County, including the cities of Asherton, Big Wells, and Carrizo Springs. The district also serves several unincorporated areas, including Brundage, Carrizo Hill, and Catarina.

In 2009, the school district was rated "academically acceptable" by the Texas Education Agency.

== History ==
In June 1999, Asherton Independent School District was consolidated into Carrizo Springs Independent School District because the Texas Education Agency found that AISD was not taxing properly. The Asherton Elementary School remained open.

== School uniforms ==
CSCISD requires school uniforms .

Shirts must be purple, gold, or white polo shirts.

Trousers, capris, and skirts may be khaki, navy blue, or black. Denim is only allowed from Pre-Kindergarten through 2nd grade..

== Schools ==
=== Secondary schools ===
- Carrizo Springs High School (9–12)
- Carrizo Springs Junior High School (6–8)

=== Primary schools ===
- Asherton Elementary School (PreK–6)
- Big Wells Elementary School (PreK–6)
- Carrizo Springs Intermediate School (4–5)
- Carrizo Springs Elementary School (PreK–3)
