= Carrizo Springs High School =

Coordinates: 28.5188°N 99.8398°W

Location
- 335 FM RD 1917; Carrizo Springs, Texas 78834-9719; United States

Information
- School type: Public High School
- School district: Carrizo Springs Consolidated Independent School District
- Principal: Joey Cantu
- Teaching staff: 46.31 (FTE)
- Grades: 9-12
- Enrollment: 510 (2026)
- Colors: Purple & Gold
- Athletics conference: UIL Class AAA
- Mascot: Wildcat
- Website: https://cshs.cscisd.net/

Carrizo Springs High School is a public high school located in Carrizo Springs, Texas (USA) and competes in District 14-3A for football and District 28-3A for volleyball and basketball under the University Interscholastic League (UIL) 2026–2028 alignment. It is part of the Carrizo Springs Independent School District that serves all students in Dimmit County . In 2026, the school earned a B rating according to the Texas Education Agency Texas School Report Card.

== Academics ==
Carrizo Springs High School received a B rating from the Texas Education Agency (TEA) for the 2025–26 school year. The campus received an overall accountability score of 85, with a B in School Progress (84) and Closing the Gaps (86). The school’s College, Career, and Military Readiness (CCMR) score was 89, and its graduation rate was 95.2%. The campus received a C in Student Achievement (79) and a D in Academic Growth (69), identifying student achievement and academic growth as areas for continued improvement.

== Career and Technical Education ==
Carrizo Springs High School’s Career and Technical Education (CTE) program is committed to “Preparing to Succeed” by providing students with the academic and technical skills needed to succeed in the global workforce and pursue post-secondary education. In 2026, the Carrizo Springs High School College, Career, and Military Readiness (CCMR) program earned a B rating from the Texas Education Agency (TEA), reflecting continued progress in preparing students for success beyond high school.

Currently, CSHS offers 10 Programs of Study, 42 courses, and 17 industry-based certifications, serving 487 students enrolled across 725 course sections.

Students can explore a variety of career pathways, including Animal Science, Agricultural Technology and Mechanical Systems, Business Management, Carpentry, Culinary Arts, JROTC, Law Enforcement, Welding, Nursing Science, and Teaching and Training.

Their CTE programs emphasize hands-on learning, industry certifications, career exploration, and partnerships with local businesses, organizations, and colleges. This year’s highlights include a new MOU with Sul Ross State University, expanded facilities such as the Dog Grooming Clinic and Law Enforcement Utility Room, student job-shadowing opportunities with the Carrizo Springs CISD Police Department, and partnerships with local healthcare organizations.

Looking ahead to 2026–2027, CSHS will continue expanding opportunities for students through a new Information Technology – Cybersecurity and Computer Science Program of Study, college and career exploration opportunities for younger students, additional high school CTE credits for 8th graders, expanded technical dual-credit opportunities with Southwest Texas Junior College, and a Teacher & Nursing Academy partnership with Sul Ross State University.

== Athletics ==
The Carrizo Springs Wildcats compete in cross country volleyball, football, basketball, powerlifting, golf, tennis, track, softball, and baseball. The school’s athletic programs are under the direction of Giovani Gonzalez, the Athletic Director for the Carrizo Springs CISD Athletics Department.

- Carrizo Springs CISD Athletic Department

=== State titles ===
- One Act Play
  - 1957(B)

== Alumni ==
- John Ayers, (April 14, 1953 – October 2, 1995), National Football League offensive lineman for the San Francisco 49ers from 1977 through 1987.
- Tracy King, member of the Texas House of Representatives from Batesville, Texas, formerly from Carrizo Springs
- Buck Lansford, offensive lineman for the Philadelphia Eagles and the Los Angeles Rams from 1955 to 1960 as well as Jim Lansford "Longhorn Gym, his brother
