= Texas's 80th House of Representatives district =

American legislative district

Texas's 80th State House of Representatives district
Representative
Don McLaughlin; R–Uvalde
- Demographics: 15.4% White; 1.3% Black; 82.2% Hispanic; 0.6% Asian
- Population (2020) • Voting age: 192,601; 135,888

The 80th district of the Texas House of Representatives consists of a portion of Webb County and the entirety of Atascosa County, Dimmit County, Frio County, Uvalde County and Zavala County. The current representative is Don McLaughlin, who has represented the district since 2025.
