= Catarina, Texas =

- CDP
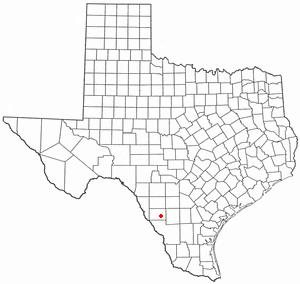
- Location of Catarina, Texas

- Coordinates: 28°20′51″N 99°36′53″W
- Country: United States
- State: Texas
- County: Dimmit

Area
  - Total: 3.8 sq mi (9.8 km^{2})
  - Land: 3.8 sq mi (9.8 km^{2})
  - Water: 0 sq mi (0.0 km^{2})
- Elevation: 551 ft (168 m)

Population (2020)
  - Total: 70
  - Density: 18/sq mi (7.1/km^{2})
- Time zone: UTC-6 (Central (CST))
  - Summer (DST): UTC-5 (CDT)
- ZIP code: 78836
- Area code: 830
- FIPS code: 48-13324
- GNIS feature ID: 1332326

Catarina is a census-designated place (CDP) in Dimmit County, Texas, United States. The population was 70 at the 2020 census. The community has no U.S. Post Office.

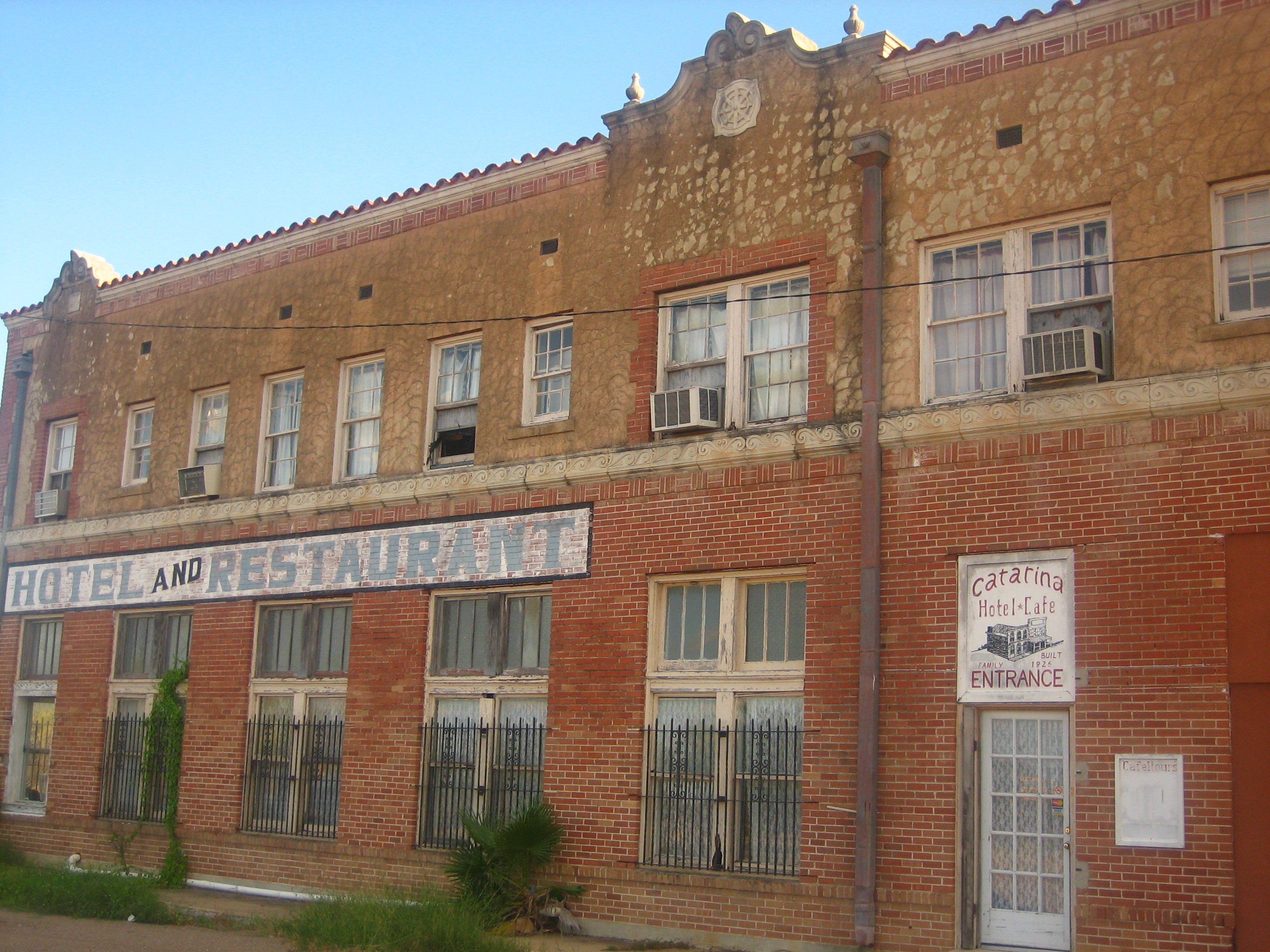
The abandoned Catarina Hotel and Restaurant

== Geography ==
Catarina is located at 28°20′51″N 99°36′53″W (28.347567, -99.614690).

According to the United States Census Bureau, the CDP has a total area of 3.8 square miles (9.8 km^{2}), all land.

== Demographics ==
Historical population
Census	Pop.	Note	%±
2000	135		—
2010	118		−12.6%
2020	70		−40.7%
U.S. Decennial Census; 1850–1900 1910; 1920 1930 1940; 1950 1960 1970; 1980 1990 2000; 2010 2020

Catarina first appeared as a census designated place in the 2000 U.S. census.

=== 2020 census ===
Catarina CDP, Texas – Racial and ethnic composition Note: the US Census treats Hispanic/Latino as an ethnic category. This table excludes Latinos from the racial categories and assigns them to a separate category. Hispanics/Latinos may be of any race.
Race / Ethnicity (NH = Non-Hispanic)	Pop 2000	Pop 2010	Pop 2020	% 2000	% 2010	% 2020
White alone (NH)	28	23	9	20.74%	19.49%	12.86%
Black or African American alone (NH)	0	0	0	0.00%	0.00%	0.00%
Native American or Alaska Native alone (NH)	0	0	0	0.00%	0.00%	0.00%
Asian alone (NH)	0	1	0	0.00%	0.85%	0.00%
Native Hawaiian or Pacific Islander alone (NH)	0	0	0	0.00%	0.00%	0.00%
Other race alone (NH)	0	0	0	0.00%	0.00%	0.00%
Mixed race or Multiracial (NH)	0	0	0	0.00%	0.00%	0.00%
Hispanic or Latino (any race)	107	94	61	79.26%	79.66%	87.14%
Total	135	118	70	100.00%	100.00%	100.00%

=== 2000 census ===
As of the census of 2000, there were 135 people, 46 households, and 40 families residing in the CDP. The population density was 35.7 inhabitants per square mile (13.8/km^{2}). There were 77 housing units at an average density of 20.4/sq mi (7.9/km^{2}). The racial makeup of the CDP was 80.74% White, 19.26% from other races. Hispanic or Latino of any race were 79.26% of the population.

There were 46 households, out of which 30.4% had children under the age of 18 living with them, 71.7% were married couples living together, 17.4% had a female householder with no husband present, and 10.9% were non-families. 8.7% of all households were made up of individuals, and 2.2% had someone living alone who was 65 years of age or older. The average household size was 2.93 and the average family size was 3.15.

In the CDP, the population was spread out, with 20.7% under the age of 18, 8.9% from 18 to 24, 19.3% from 25 to 44, 27.4% from 45 to 64, and 23.7% who were 65 years of age or older. The median age was 46 years. For every 100 females, there were 87.5 males. For every 100 females age 18 and over, there were 91.1 males.

The median income for a household in the CDP was $41,000, and the median income for a family was $41,000. Males had a median income of $58,750 versus $24,750 for females. The per capita income for the CDP was $16,270. There were 5.0% of families and 5.9% of the population living below the poverty line, including no under eighteens and 8.7% of those over 64.

== Education ==
The CDP is served by the Carrizo Springs Consolidated Independent School District.

== In popular culture ==
Catarina is the subject of the Texas Country song "Cowboy From Catarina" by Max Stalling.
