= Dimmit County, Texas =

County in Texas, United States

- County
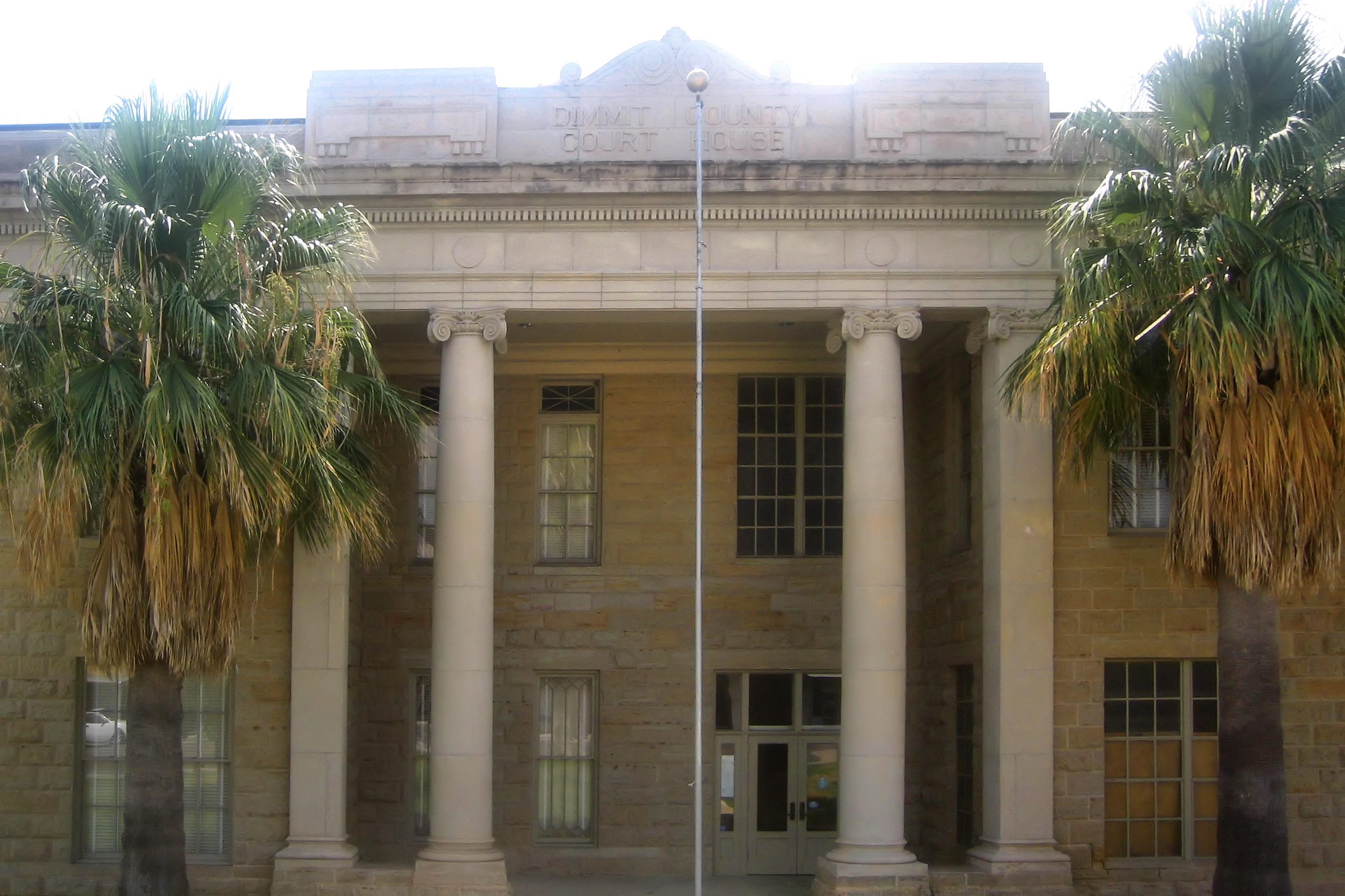
- Dimmit County Courthouse in Carrizo Springs located off U.S. Highway 277

- Location within the U.S. state of Texas
- Coordinates: 28°25′N 99°45′W
- Country: United States
- State: Texas
- Founded: 1858
- Named for: Philip Dimmitt
- Seat: Carrizo Springs
- Largest city: Carrizo Springs

Area
  - Total: 1,335 sq mi (3,460 km^{2})
  - Land: 1,329 sq mi (3,440 km^{2})
  - Water: 5.6 sq mi (15 km^{2}) 0.4%

Population (2020)
  - Total: 8,615
  - Estimate (2025): 8,024 ▼
  - Density: 6.5/sq mi (2.5/km^{2})
- Time zone: UTC−6 (Central)
  - Summer (DST): UTC−5 (CDT)
- Congressional district: 23rd
- Website: www.dimmitcounty.org

Dimmit County (/ˈdɪmɪt/ DIM-it) is a county located in the U.S. state of Texas. As of the 2020 census, its population was 8,615. Its county seat is Carrizo Springs. The county was founded in 1858 and later organized in 1880. It is named after Philip Dimmitt, a major figure in the Texas Revolution. The spelling of the county name and the individual's name differ because of a spelling error in the bill creating the county name.

== History ==
=== Native Americans ===
Paleo-Indians artifacts indicate these people lived in Dimmit County as far back as 9200 BC. The archaic period (6000 BC to AD 1000) up to the arrival of the Spanish brought increased hunter-gatherers to the area. These Indians subsisted mostly on game, wild fruits, seeds, and roots. They carved tools from wood and stone, wove baskets, and sewed rabbitskin robes. They also made pottery and hunted with bows and arrows. Their most effective weapon was the atlatl, a throwing stick that greatly increased the deadliness of their spears. Coahuiltecan Indians native to now-Dimmit County were later squeezed out by Apache and Comanche. In 1870, Comanches and Kiowas raided the county, killing 3 men and stealing a Mexican boy. Texas Rangers and local volunteers, as well as disease, ran the Indians out of the county by 1877.

=== The Wild Horse Desert ===
The area between the Rio Grande and the Nueces River, which included the county, became disputed territory known as the Wild Horse Desert, where neither the Republic of Texas nor the Mexican government had clear control. Ownership was in dispute until the Mexican–American War. The area became filled with lawless characters, who deterred settlers in the area. An agreement signed between Mexico and the United States in the 1930s put the liability of payments to the descendants of the original land grants on Mexico.

=== County established and settlements ===
Dimmit County was officially established in 1858 from parts of Bexar, Webb, Maverick, and Uvalde Counties. The county was organized in 1880. Carrizo Springs became the county seat.

Early settlers found Dimmit County to be an abundant grassland with mesquite, oak, and ash trees and wildlife that included buffalo, deer, turkeys, feral horses (mustangs), panthers, and javelinas. Artesian springs, bubbling up from a vast reservoir of underground water, fed into running streams that harbored giant catfish, crawfish, and mussels. Explorers found the area a good place to hunt mustangs, and to feed and water cattle.

Pioneering cattleman Levi English settled Carrizo Springs in 1865 with a group of 15 families from Atascosa County. Within two years, they were joined by a second group of settlers from Goliad County. Early dwellings were crude adobe structures or dugouts. In 1880, Levi English donated land for a county courthouse, schools, and churches in the town.

Lawlessness, banditry, and in particular, cattle rustling from both sides of the Mexican border, pervaded until the 1880s. Marshal J. King Fisher, managed to bring about a reduction in the lawlessness. King also staunchly enforced the "dry county" law once the residents voted to outlaw the sale of alcohol.

Dimmit County's first producing oil well was drilled in 1943. In 1980, Dimmit County farmers earned about $20 million for their crops, while about $60 million in oil and gas were produced.

Formation of the 1914 White Man's Primary Association was designed to exclude Latino Americans from any meaningful participation in county politics. In the 1944 Smith v. Allwright case, the United States Supreme Court found the White Primary to be unconstitutional.

=== Water ===
D.C. Frazier drilled the first artesian well, which produced gallons of water a minute, near Carrizo Springs in 1884. By 1900, about 25 artesian wells were flowing in the Carrizo Springs area, but most of the water was wasted, and very little was used for irrigation. Colonel J.S. Taylor introduced large-scale Bermuda onion and strawberry farming to the area, and was the first to use irrigation on a large scale in Dimmit County. In 1899, Taylor built a 30 ft dam across the Nueces River to irrigate 2,000 acres (8.1 km^{2}) of farmland. He also drilled a deep artesian well. By 1910, Taylor's methods were being imitated by a number of other developers and vegetable farmers. Irrigation helped make Dimmit County part of the Texas Winter Garden region. By the 1920s, however, artesian water began to dry up. The necessity of installing expensive pumps drove many farmers out of business. By 1934, the United States Department of the Interior concluded that the existing water supply would not support substantial additional development. By 1965, only about 15,000 acres (61 km^{2}) were being irrigated. Much of the land reverted to rangeland.

=== Oil ===
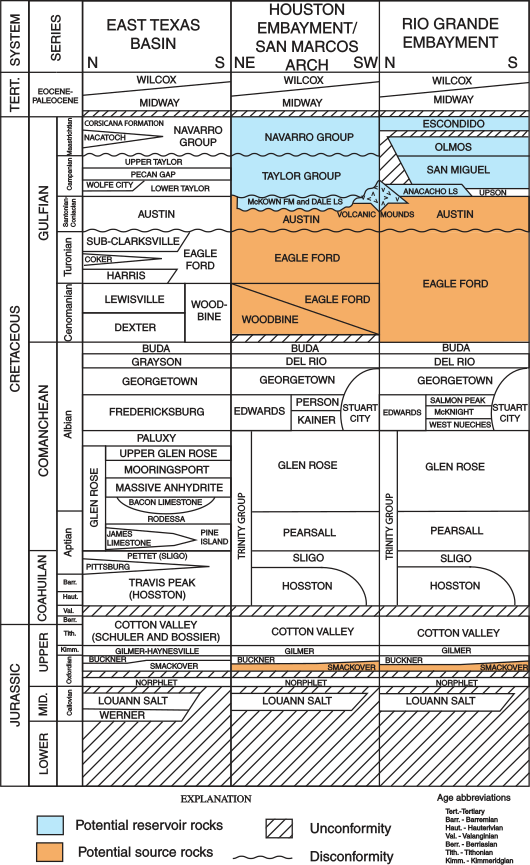
San Miguel and Olmos Formations stratigraphic column

The Big Wells oil field, east of Big Wells, was discovered in 1969. The field produces from the Cretaceous San Miguel Formation sandstone underlying the Olmos Formation sandstone. The field extends north into Zavala.

The Eagle Ford oil field was reported to be under development in 2011, with 3,000 wells projected to extract oil by hydraulic fracturing from tight shale formations. The oil play has improved business activity in the county, but raised fears regarding the adequacy of water supplies, as fracking requires injection of large quantities of water under pressure into wells to break surrounding rock.

== Geography ==
According to the U.S. Census Bureau, the county has a total area of 1,335 sq mi (3,460 km^{2}), of which 5.6 square miles (15 km^{2}) (0.4%) are covered by water.

=== Major highways ===
- U.S. Highway 83
- U.S. Highway 277
- State Highway 85
- Loop 225
- Loop 517

=== Adjacent counties ===
- Zavala County (north)
- Frio County (northeast)
- La Salle County (east)
- Webb County (south)
- Maverick County (west)

== Demographics ==
Historical population
Census	Pop.	Note	%±
1870	109		—
1880	665		510.1%
1890	1,049		57.7%
1900	1,106		5.4%
1910	3,460		212.8%
1920	5,296		53.1%
1930	8,828		66.7%
1940	8,542		−3.2%
1950	10,654		24.7%
1960	10,095		−5.2%
1970	9,039		−10.5%
1980	11,367		25.8%
1990	10,433		−8.2%
2000	10,248		−1.8%
2010	9,996		−2.5%
2020	8,615		−13.8%
2025 (est.)	8,024	▼	−6.9%
U.S. Decennial Census; 1850–2010 2010–2020

=== Racial and ethnic composition ===
Dimmit County, Texas – Racial and ethnic composition Note: the US Census treats Hispanic/Latino as an ethnic category. This table excludes Latinos from the racial categories and assigns them to a separate category. Hispanics/Latinos may be of any race.
Race / Ethnicity (NH = Non-Hispanic)	Pop 1980	Pop 1990	Pop 2000	Pop 2010	Pop 2020	% 1980	% 1990	% 2000	% 2010	% 2020
White alone (NH)	2,416	1,655	1,350	1,217	898	21.25%	15.86%	13.17%	12.17%	10.42%
Black or African American alone (NH)	62	50	67	81	72	0.55%	0.48%	0.65%	0.81%	0.84%
Native American or Alaska Native alone (NH)	20	14	23	7	8	0.18%	0.13%	0.22%	0.07%	0.09%
Asian alone (NH)	14	4	68	51	68	0.12%	0.04%	0.66%	0.51%	0.79%
Native Hawaiian or Pacific Islander alone (NH)	x	x	0	0	10	x	x	0.00%	0.00%	0.12%
Other race alone (NH)	10	22	0	10	12	0.09%	0.21%	0.00%	0.10%	0.14%
Mixed race or Multiracial (NH)	x	x	32	14	60	x	x	0.31%	0.14%	0.70%
Hispanic or Latino (any race)	8,845	8,688	8,708	8,616	7,487	77.81%	83.27%	84.97%	86.19%	86.91%
Total	11,367	10,433	10,248	9,996	8,615	100.00%	100.00%	100.00%	100.00%	100.00%

=== 2020 census ===
As of the 2020 census, the county had a population of 8,615. The median age was 38.2 years. 26.8% of residents were under the age of 18 and 18.3% of residents were 65 years of age or older. For every 100 females there were 94.4 males, and for every 100 females age 18 and over there were 92.1 males age 18 and over.

The racial makeup of the county was 44.7% White, 1.0% Black or African American, 0.6% American Indian and Alaska Native, 0.8% Asian, 0.2% Native Hawaiian and Pacific Islander, 17.8% from some other race, and 34.9% from two or more races. Hispanic or Latino residents of any race comprised 86.9% of the population.

65.2% of residents lived in urban areas, while 34.8% lived in rural areas.

There were 3,020 households in the county, of which 36.9% had children under the age of 18 living in them. Of all households, 43.5% were married-couple households, 18.3% were households with a male householder and no spouse or partner present, and 31.6% were households with a female householder and no spouse or partner present. About 24.8% of all households were made up of individuals and 12.7% had someone living alone who was 65 years of age or older.

There were 3,980 housing units, of which 24.1% were vacant. Among occupied housing units, 71.0% were owner-occupied and 29.0% were renter-occupied. The homeowner vacancy rate was 2.7% and the rental vacancy rate was 25.6%.

=== 2000 census ===
As of the census of 2000, 10,248 people, 3,308 households, and 2,646 families were residing in the county. The population density was 8 people per square mile (3.1 people/km^{2}). The 4,112 housing units averaged 3 units per square mile (1.2/km^{2}). The racial makeup of the county was 76.95% White, 0.88% African American, 0.70% Native American, 0.66% Asian, 18.3% from other races, and 2.51% from two or more races. About 84.97% of the population were Hispanic or Latino of any race.

Of the 3,308 households, 42.0% had children under 18 living with them, 57.4% were married couples living together, 17.2% had a female householder with no husband present, and 20.0% were not families. About 18.0% of all households were made up of individuals, and 9.30% had someone living alone who was 65 age or older. The average household size was 3.06, and the average family size was 3.48.

In the county, the age distribution was 33.2% under 18, 8.8% from 18 to 24, 24.70% from 25 to 44, 20.7% from 45 to 64, and 12.6% who were 65 or older. The median age was 32 years. For every 100 females, there were 94.30 males. For every 100 females age 18 and over, there were 91.10 males.

The median income for a household in the county was $21,917, and for a family was $24,579. Males had a median income of $25,000 versus $15,370 for females. The per capita income for the county was $9,765. About 33.20% of the population and 29.70% of families were below the poverty line. Of the total population, 40.30% of those under the age of 18 and 31.50% of those 65 and older were living below the poverty line. The county's per capita income makes it one of the poorest counties in the United States.

== Politics ==
Like most of heavily Hispanic South Texas, Dimmit votes predominantly Democratic. While the state of Texas went strongly for Republican George W. Bush in the 2004 presidential election, Dimmit County was a traditional stronghold of the Democratic Party, supporting U.S. Senator John F. Kerry of Massachusetts, with 2,365 votes for Kerry to 1,188 for Bush. The last Republican to win a majority in Dimmit County was Richard Nixon in 1972. In 1892, Dimmit County gave all its few votes to Populist James B. Weaver, thus making it his leading county.

United States presidential election results for Dimmit County, Texas
Year	Republican		Democratic		Third party(ies)	
Year	No.	%	No.	%	No.	%
1912	131	27.58%	292	61.47%	52	10.95%
1916	74	27.61%	193	72.01%	1	0.37%
1920	108	31.49%	231	67.35%	4	1.17%
1924	180	36.51%	289	58.62%	24	4.87%
1928	626	70.81%	258	29.19%	0	0.00%
1932	241	22.11%	843	77.34%	6	0.55%
1936	296	28.99%	704	68.95%	21	2.06%
1940	340	31.51%	736	68.21%	3	0.28%
1944	328	33.57%	554	56.70%	95	9.72%
1948	384	29.14%	863	65.48%	71	5.39%
1952	954	65.34%	503	34.45%	3	0.21%
1956	705	61.90%	427	37.49%	7	0.61%
1960	648	42.16%	886	57.64%	3	0.20%
1964	501	29.68%	1,184	70.14%	3	0.18%
1968	584	35.18%	896	53.98%	180	10.84%
1972	1,172	51.81%	1,078	47.66%	12	0.53%
1976	890	33.92%	1,721	65.59%	13	0.50%
1980	1,173	35.30%	2,102	63.26%	48	1.44%
1984	1,338	34.38%	2,546	65.42%	8	0.21%
1988	900	24.65%	2,735	74.91%	16	0.44%
1992	844	19.27%	3,172	72.42%	364	8.31%
1996	604	20.19%	2,242	74.96%	145	4.85%
2000	1,032	27.50%	2,678	71.36%	43	1.15%
2004	1,188	33.31%	2,365	66.32%	13	0.36%
2008	874	24.37%	2,692	75.05%	21	0.59%
2012	762	26.12%	2,141	73.40%	14	0.48%
2016	974	30.20%	2,173	67.38%	78	2.42%
2020	1,384	37.75%	2,264	61.76%	18	0.49%
2024	1,653	48.23%	1,765	51.50%	9	0.26%

United States Senate election results for Dimmit County, Texas1
Year	Republican		Democratic		Third party(ies)	
Year	No.	%	No.	%	No.	%
2024	1,305	40.24%	1,849	57.02%	89	2.74%

United States Senate election results for Dimmit County, Texas2
Year	Republican		Democratic		Third party(ies)	
Year	No.	%	No.	%	No.	%
2020	1,274	36.74%	2,122	61.19%	72	2.08%

Texas Gubernatorial election results for Dimmit County
Year	Republican		Democratic		Third party(ies)	
Year	No.	%	No.	%	No.	%
2022	1,080	37.55%	1,757	61.09%	39	1.36%

== Education ==
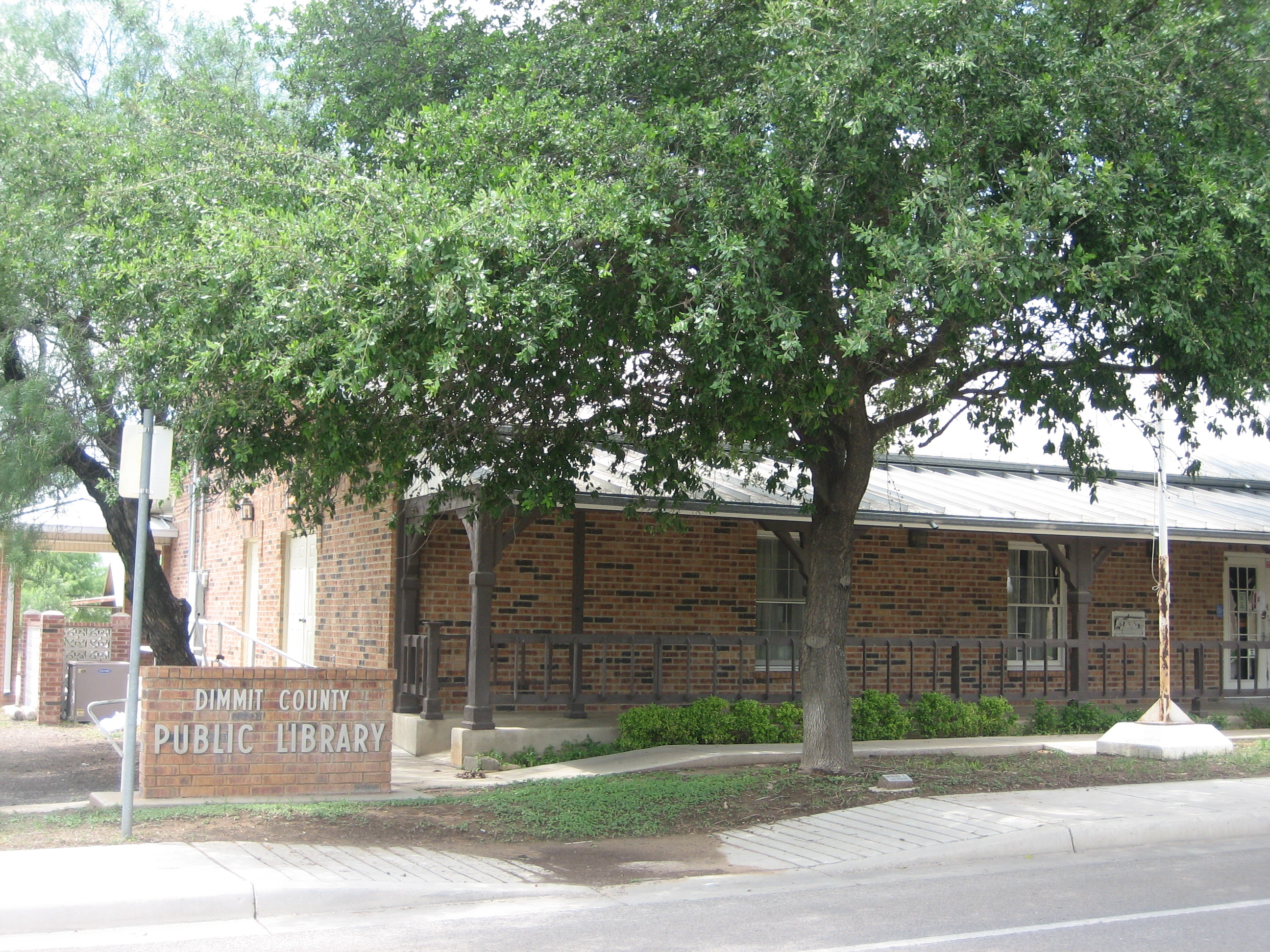
The Dimmit County Library in Carrizo Springs

All of Dimmit County is served by the Carrizo Springs Independent School District.

Asherton Independent School District closed in 1999 and joined Carrizo Springs ISD.

The designated community college is Southwest Texas Junior College.

== Communities ==
Map of Dimmit County, with Carrizo Springs highlighted

=== Cities ===
- Asherton
- Big Wells
- Carrizo Springs (county seat)

=== Census-designated places ===
- Brundage
- Carrizo Hill
- Catarina

=== Hamlets ===
- Las Vegas

== See also ==
- Asher and Mary Isabelle Richardson House
- National Register of Historic Places listings in Dimmit County, Texas
- Recorded Texas Historic Landmarks in Dimmit County
- Winter Garden Region
