= Carrizo Springs, Texas =

- City
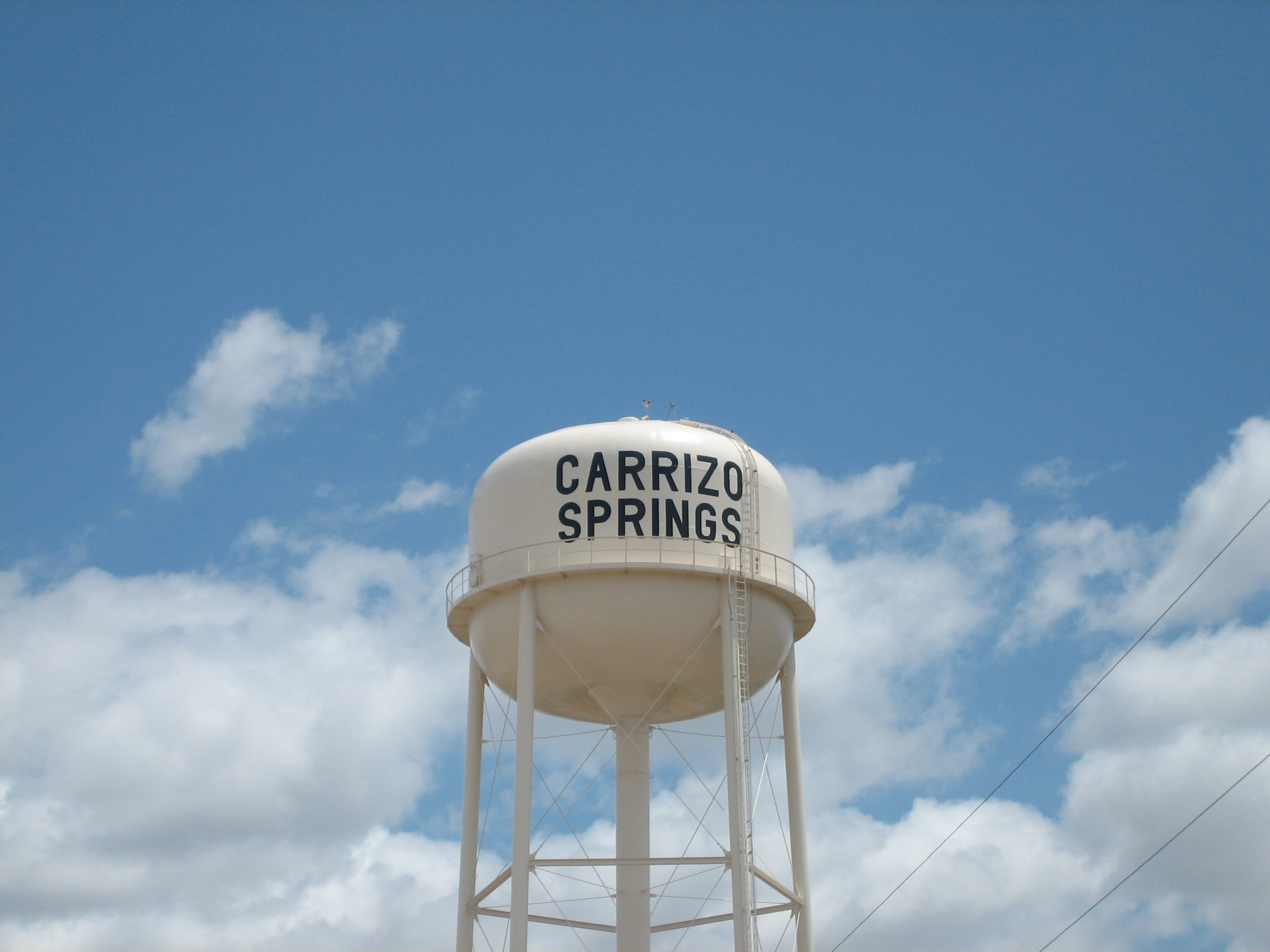
- Carrizo Springs water tower

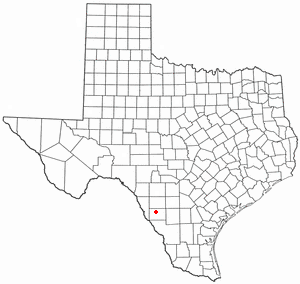
- Location in the state of Texas

- Coordinates: 28°31′16″N 99°51′26″W
- Country: United States
- State: Texas
- County: Dimmit

Government
  - Mayor: Dina Ojeda-Balderas

Area
  - Total: 3.10 sq mi (8.03 km^{2})
  - Land: 3.09 sq mi (8.00 km^{2})
  - Water: 0.012 sq mi (0.03 km^{2})
- Elevation: 604 ft (184 m)

Population (2020)
  - Total: 4,892
  - Density: 1,580/sq mi (612/km^{2})
- Time zone: UTC-6 (CST)
  - Summer (DST): UTC-5 (CDT)
- ZIP code: 78834
- Area code: 830
- FIPS code: 48-12988
- GNIS feature ID: 1372953
- Website: cityofcarrizo.org

Carrizo Springs is the largest city in and the county seat of Dimmit County, Texas, United States. The population was 4,892 at the 2020 census, down from 5,368 at the 2010 census.

The name of the town is derived from the local springs, which were named by the Spanish for the cane grass that once grew around them. It is the oldest town in Dimmit County. Artesian wells in the area are known for their pure, clean water. This water is often exported from Carrizo Springs for use as holy water.

== History ==
Carrizo Springs lies along U.S. Route 83, approximately 82 miles northwest of Laredo, Texas and 45 miles north of the Mexican border. Route 83 intersects U.S. Route 277 there. The name "Carrizo Springs" derives from similarly named springs in the area; the name is Spanish for a type of grass once common in the area. Founded in 1865 by settlers from Atascosa County, Carrizo Springs is the oldest community in the county.

Carrizo Springs, along with San Antonio, Uvalde, Crystal City, and Corpus Christi, was a major stop on the defunct San Antonio, Uvalde and Gulf Railroad, a Class I rail carrier line, which operated from 1909 until it was merged into the Missouri Pacific Railroad in 1956.

More recently, Carrizo Springs has become the home of the only olive orchard and oil press in Texas.

== Geography ==
Carrizo Springs is located at 28°31′16″N 99°51′26″W.

According to the United States Census Bureau, the city has a total area of 3.1 square miles (8.0 km^{2}), of which 3.1 sq mi (8.0 km^{2}) are land and less than 0.01 mi^{2} is covered by water.

=== Climate ===
Carrizo Springs experiences a hot semi-arid climate with mild winters and hot summers. During the spring season, as well occasionally during the fall season, severe thunderstorms often build on the Serranias Del Burro to the distant west of Carrizo Springs. This is believed to occur due to the uplift of moisture from the Gulf of Mexico which is channeled along the Rio Grande River.

Climate data for Carrizo Springs, Texas (1991–2020 normals, (Note: Mean monthly maxima and minima (i.e. the highest and lowest temperature readings during an entire month or year) calculated based on data at said location from 1991 to 2020.) extremes 1912–present)
Month	Jan	Feb	Mar	Apr	May	Jun	Jul	Aug	Sep	Oct	Nov	Dec	Year
Record high °F (°C)	96 (36)	101 (38)	107 (42)	111 (44)	109 (43)	114 (46)	112 (44)	109 (43)	111 (44)	104 (40)	100 (38)	98 (37)	114 (46)
Mean maximum °F (°C)	84 (29)	89 (32)	93 (34)	99 (37)	102 (39)	104 (40)	104 (40)	105 (41)	101 (38)	97 (36)	89 (32)	82 (28)	107 (42)
Mean daily maximum °F (°C)	66.2 (19.0)	71.0 (21.7)	78.4 (25.8)	85.8 (29.9)	91.5 (33.1)	97.0 (36.1)	99.2 (37.3)	99.4 (37.4)	92.8 (33.8)	85.2 (29.6)	74.5 (23.6)	67.2 (19.6)	83.8 (28.8)
Mean daily minimum °F (°C)	39.0 (3.9)	44.0 (6.7)	52.3 (11.3)	58.6 (14.8)	67.2 (19.6)	72.9 (22.7)	74.3 (23.5)	74.3 (23.5)	69.2 (20.7)	59.9 (15.5)	49.1 (9.5)	40.0 (4.4)	58.3 (14.6)
Mean minimum °F (°C)	26 (−3)	29 (−2)	34 (1)	42 (6)	53 (12)	66 (19)	70 (21)	69 (21)	57 (14)	41 (5)	32 (0)	26 (−3)	23 (−5)
Record low °F (°C)	12 (−11)	12 (−11)	21 (−6)	31 (−1)	41 (5)	56 (13)	55 (13)	61 (16)	43 (6)	31 (−1)	22 (−6)	10 (−12)	10 (−12)
Average precipitation inches (mm)	1.01 (26)	0.77 (20)	1.42 (36)	1.26 (32)	2.95 (75)	1.90 (48)	1.67 (42)	1.45 (37)	3.37 (86)	2.00 (51)	1.19 (30)	0.94 (24)	19.93 (507)
Average snowfall inches (cm)	trace	trace	trace	0 (0)	0 (0)	0 (0)	0 (0)	0 (0)	0 (0)	0 (0)	trace	0.1 (0.25)	0.1 (0.25)
Average precipitation days (≥ 0.01 in)	5	4	5	3	5	4	4	3	6	4	4	4	55
Average snowy days (≥ 0.1 in)	0	0	0	0	0	0	0	0	0	0	0	0	0
Source: NOAA

== Demographics ==
Historical population
Census	Pop.	Note	%±
1890	289		—
1920	954		—
1930	2,171		127.6%
1940	2,494		14.9%
1950	4,316		73.1%
1960	5,699		32.0%
1970	5,374		−5.7%
1980	6,886		28.1%
1990	5,745		−16.6%
2000	5,655		−1.6%
2010	5,368		−5.1%
2020	4,892		−8.9%
U.S. Decennial Census

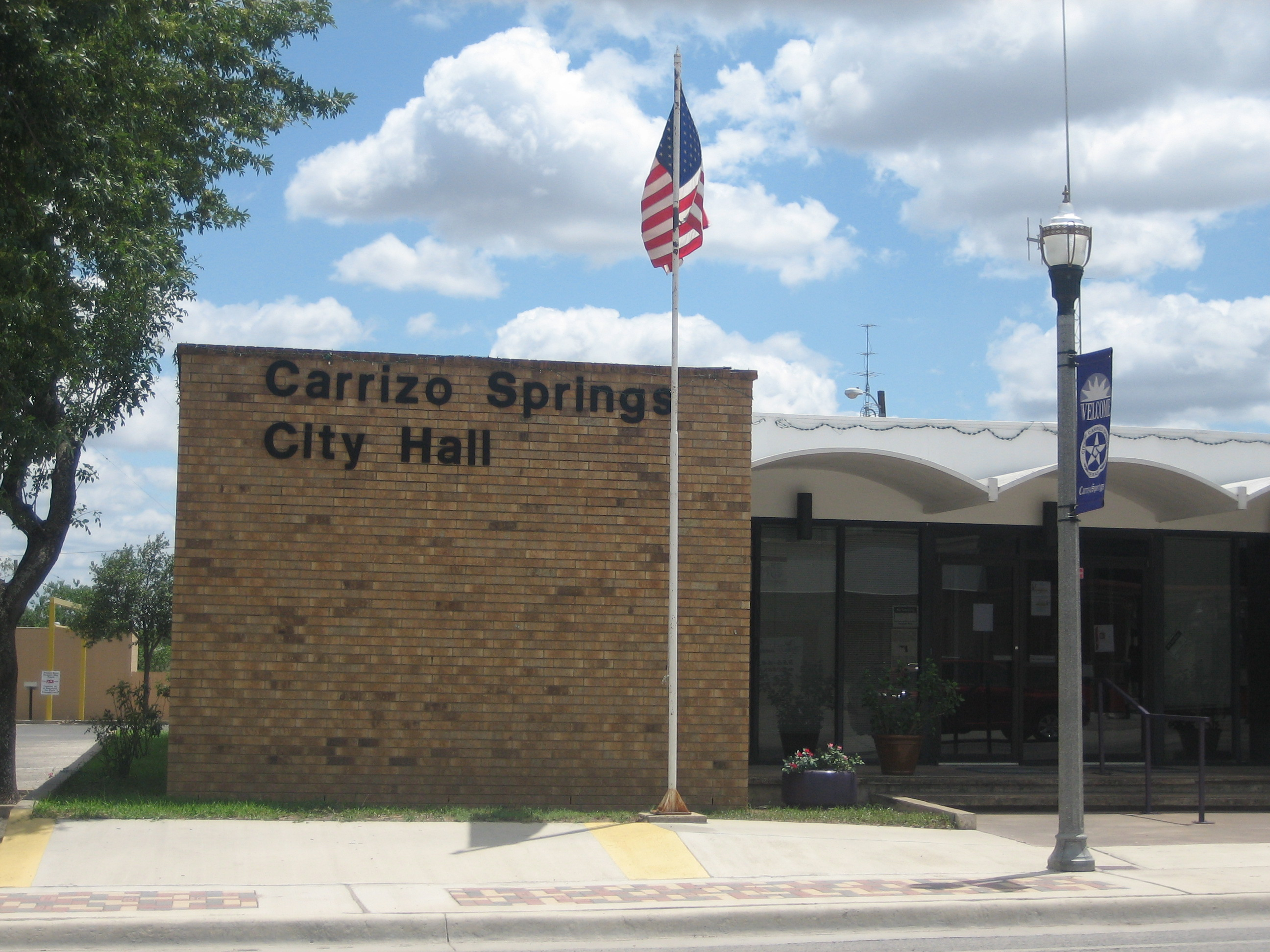
City Hall in Carrizo Springs on U.S. Highway 277

=== 2020 census ===
As of the 2020 census, there were 4,892 people in the city. The median age was 36.8 years, 28.0% of residents were under the age of 18, 17.9% of residents were 65 years of age or older, and for every 100 females there were 88.8 males, with 86.3 males for every 100 females age 18 and over.

There were 1,741 households in Carrizo Springs, of which 38.3% had children under the age of 18, 40.6% were married-couple households, 17.8% were households with a male householder and no spouse or partner present, and 34.8% were households with a female householder and no spouse or partner present; 1,243 of these households were families. About 25.5% of all households were made up of individuals and 13.3% had someone living alone who was 65 years of age or older.

There were 2,064 housing units, of which 15.6% were vacant. Among occupied housing units, 65.7% were owner-occupied and 34.3% were renter-occupied, with a homeowner vacancy rate of 2.5% and a rental vacancy rate of 12.2%.

99.9% of residents lived in urban areas, while 0.1% lived in rural areas.

Racial composition as of the 2020 census
Race	Percent
White	44.5%
Black or African American	1.6%
American Indian and Alaska Native	0.6%
Asian	1.0%
Native Hawaiian and Other Pacific Islander	0.2%
Some other race	18.3%
Two or more races	33.8%
Hispanic or Latino (of any race)	89.5%

=== 2000 census ===
As of the census of 2000, 5,655 people, 1,816 households, and 1,450 families were residing in the city. The population density was 1,812.9 people per mi^{2} (699.8/km^{2}). The 2,109 housing units averaged 676.1 per mi^{2} (261.0/km^{2}). The racial makeup of the city was 75.3% White, 1.3% African American, 0.7% Native American, 1.1% Asian, 19.0% from other races, and 2.6% from two or more races. Hispanics or Latinos of any race were 87.2% of the population.

Of the 1,816 households, 43.2% had children under the age of 18 living with them, 54.0% were married couples living together, 20.0% had a female householder with no husband present, and 20.1% were not families. About 17.7% of all households were made up of individuals, and 9.5% had someone living alone who was 65 or older. The average household size was 3.06, and the average family size was 3.47.

In the city, the age distribution was 33.3% under 18, 9.7% from 18 to 24, 25.0% from 25 to 44, 18.8% from 45 to 64, and 13.2% who were 65 or older. The median age was 31 years. For every 100 females, there were 91.8 males. For every 100 females age 18 and over, there were 88.3 males.

The median income for a household in the city was $21,306, and for a family was $22,375. Males had a median income of $24,536 versus $15,000 for females. The per capita income for the city was $8,642. About 30.8% of families and 33.8% of the population were below the poverty line, including 42.9% of those under age 18 and 29.9% of those age 65 or over.

== Education ==
Carrizo Springs is served by the Carrizo Springs Consolidated Independent School District and home to the Carrizo Springs High School Wildcats.

These schools serve students in the city:

- Carrizo Springs High School
- Carrizo Springs Junior High School
- Carrizo Springs Intermediate School
- Carrizo Springs Elementary School

== Migrant child detention center ==
Facilities that previously housed Stratton Oilfield Systems were chosen for a new unaccompanied minor detention site, with an estimated capacity of 1,000 to 1,600 children. Operations are contracted with BCFS Health and Human Services. When the site was previously considered under Stratton Security management, owner and president Dan Stratton assured the area's residents that potential residents would not be refugees of the Syrian Civil War or speak Arabic. He emphasized that refugees would be securely kept within the facility and would not interact with or murder area residents. The site opened for one month in 2019 and later reopened in February 2021.

== Gallery ==
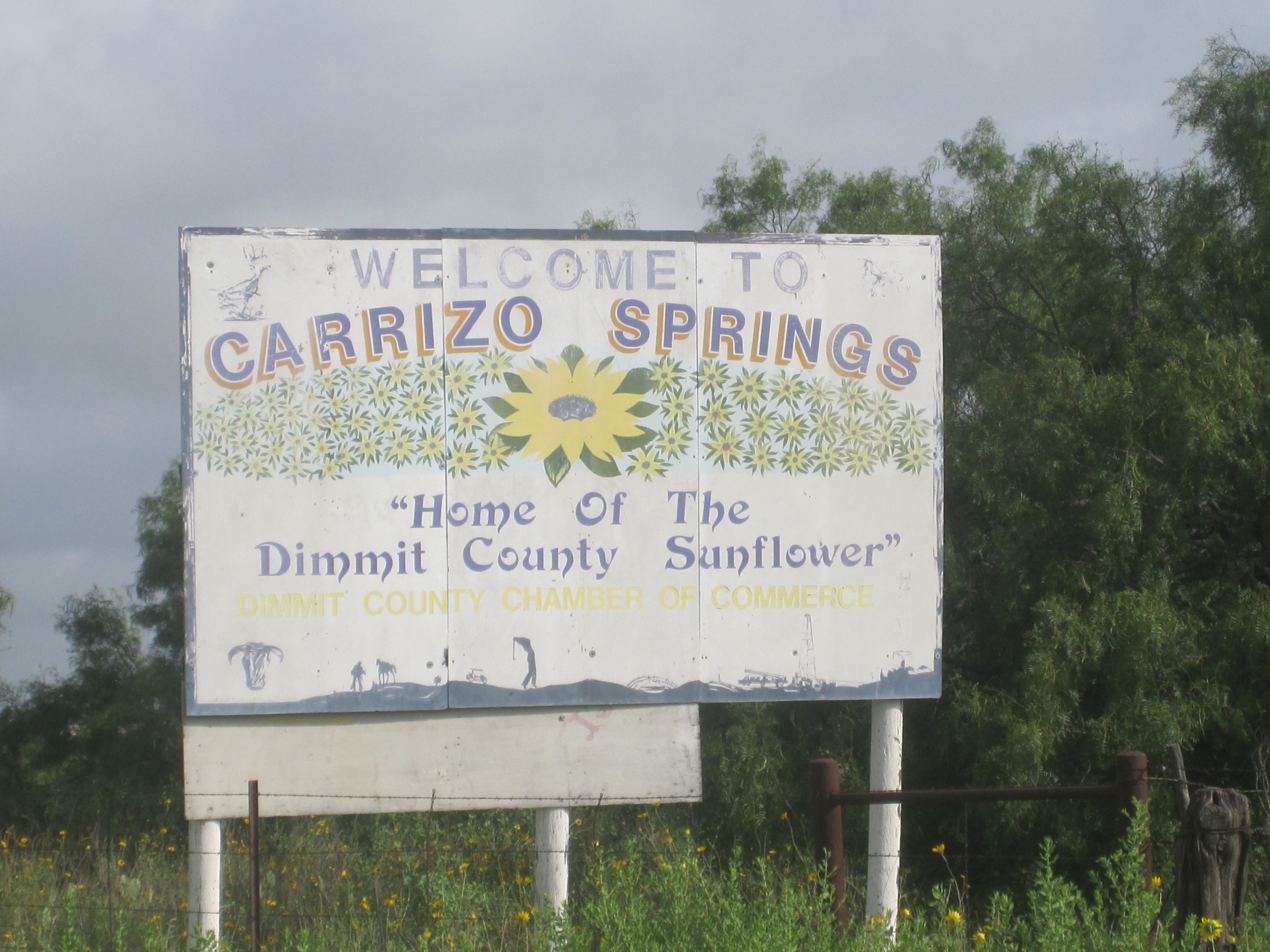
Like the state of Kansas, Carrizo Springs identifies itself with the sunflower, Dimmit County-style

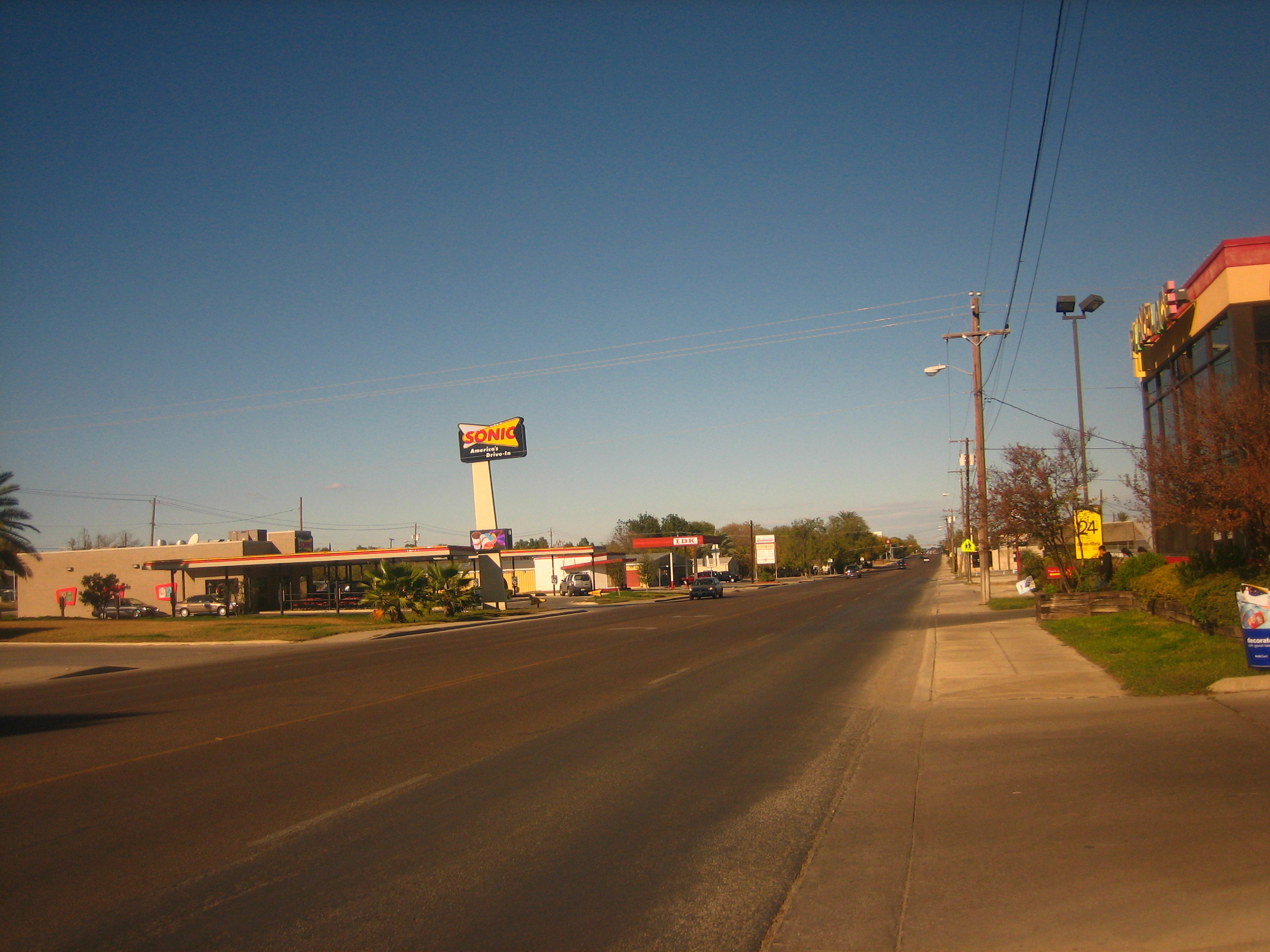
Along U.S. Route 83 in Carrizo Springs

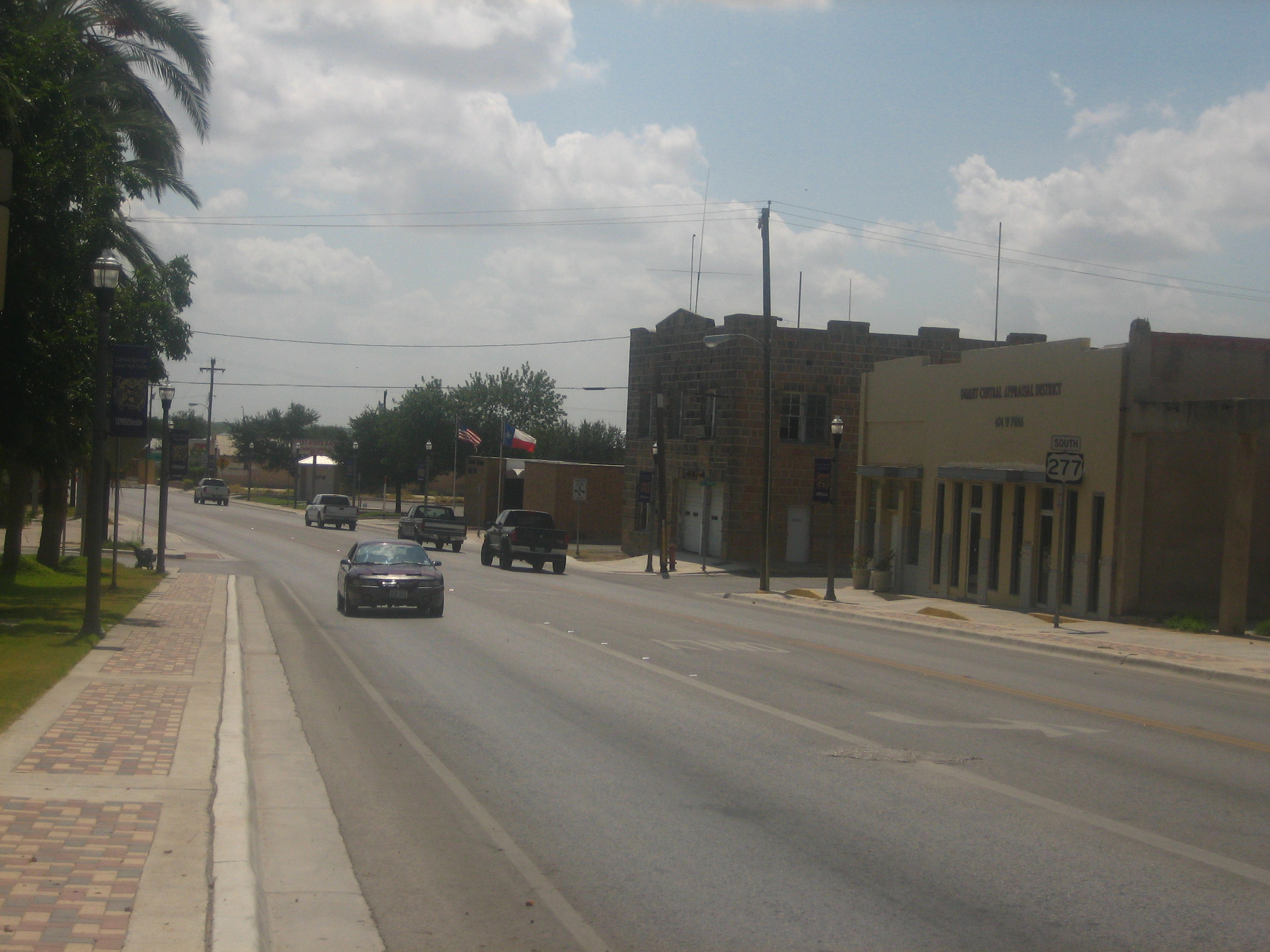
Along U.S. Route 277 in Carrizo Springs

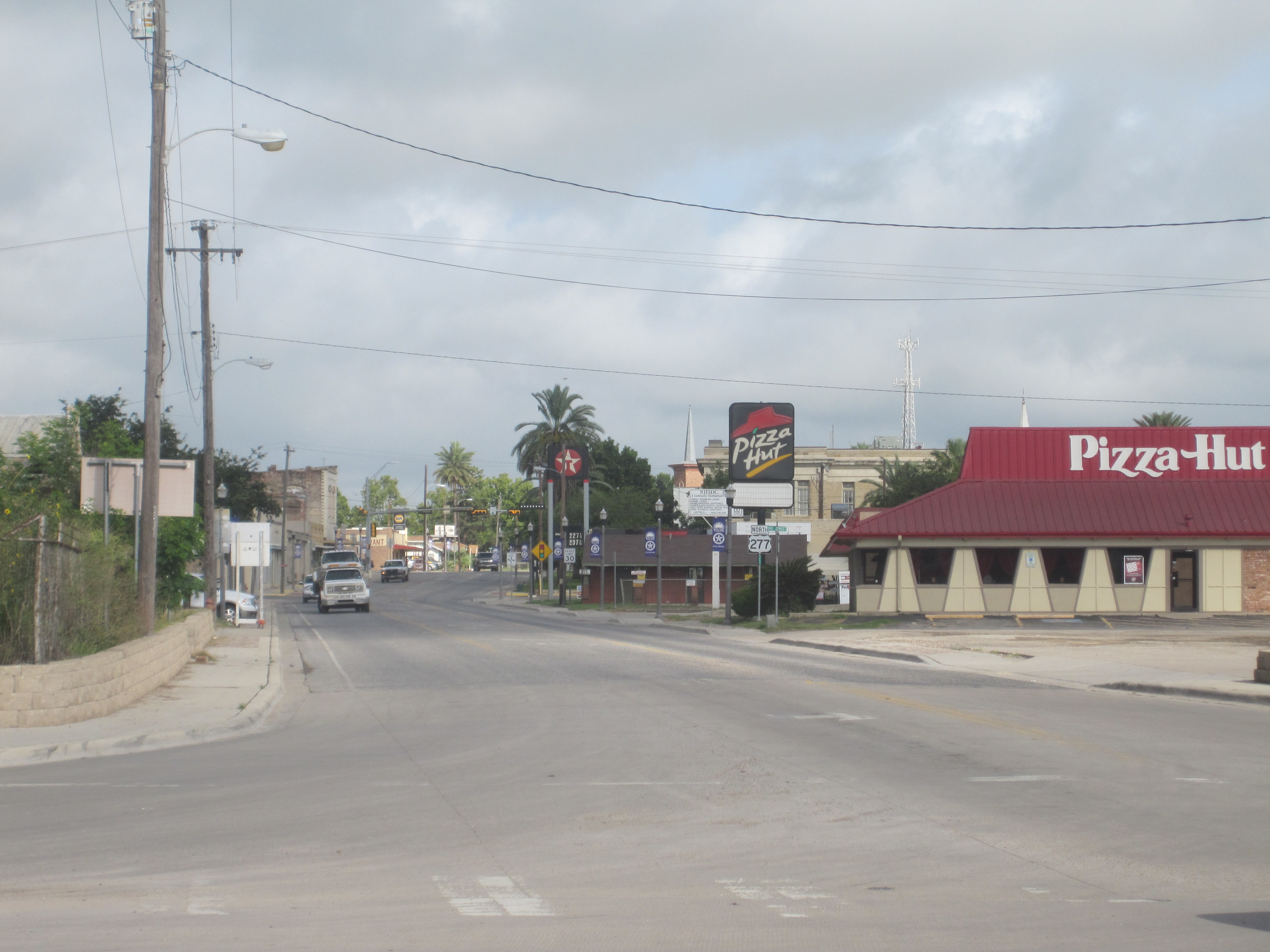
Intersection of Highways 277 (west) and 83 (north) in Carrizo Springs

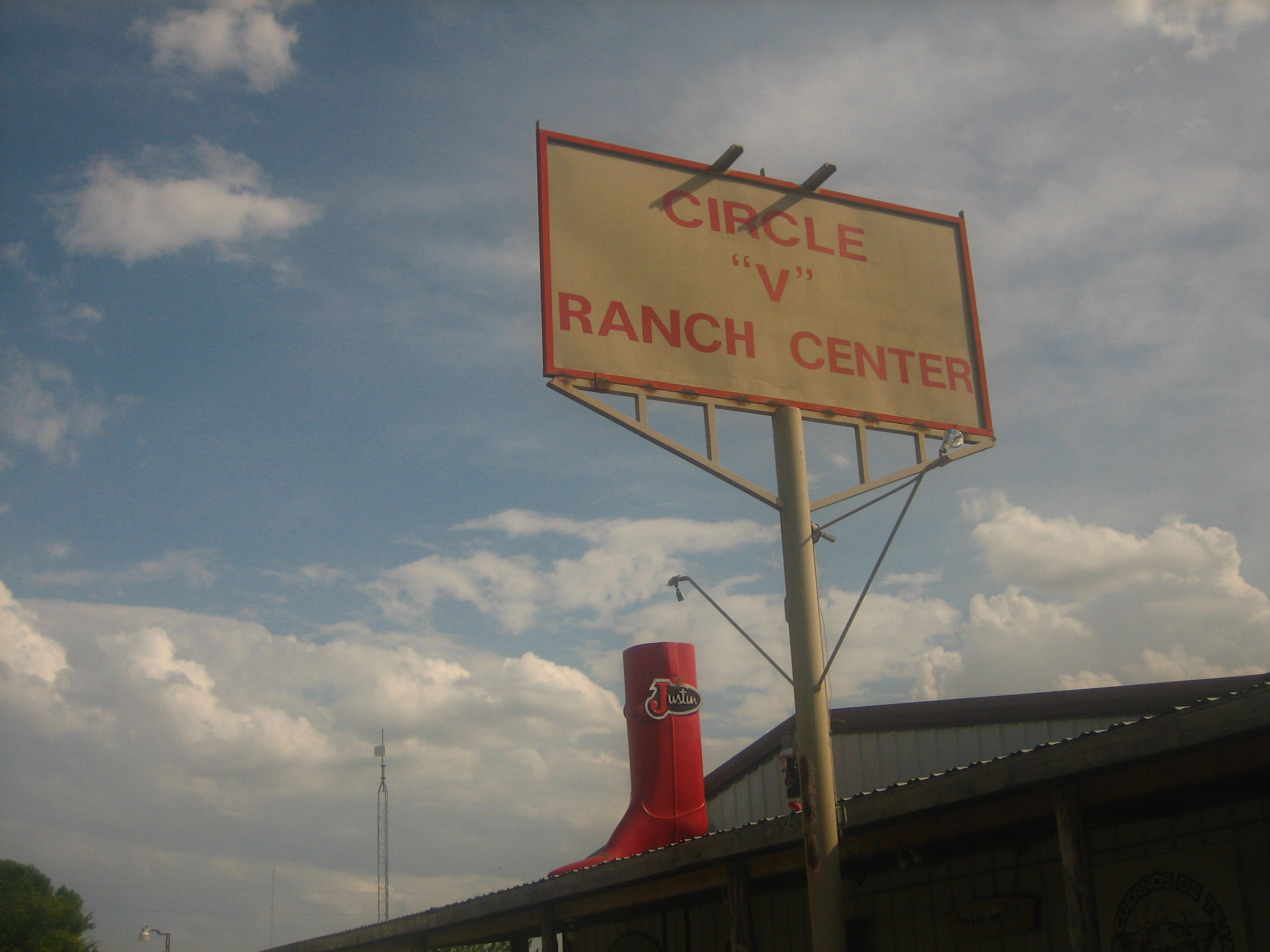
With its display of a large red Justin boot, the Circle V Ranch Center in Carrizo Springs reflects the western culture of the community
