= Yvonne Gonzalez Toureilles =

American politician

Member of the Texas House of Representatives from the 35th district
- In office January 11, 2005 – January 11, 2011
- Preceded by: Gabi Canales
- Succeeded by: Jose Aliseda

Personal details
- Party: Democratic
- Spouse: Marc Jean Toureilles
- Education: University of Texas School of Law (JD)
- Occupation: Attorney

Yvonne Gonzalez Toureilles is an American attorney in private practice and a former politician. She was member of the Texas House of Representatives and represented the 35th district from 2005 to 2011. She was the chair of the House Committee on Agriculture and Livestock in 2009 and was affiliated with the democratic party.

== Election history ==
In 2004, Gonzalez Toureilles defeated incumbent Gabi Canales in the Democratic party primary runoff election. On November 4, 2004, she defeated the republican candidate, Eric Opiela, and won 50.93% of the vote. She assumed office on January 11, 2005.

On November 2, 2010, Gonzalez Toureilles was defeated in the general election by the a republican candidate, Jose Aliseda, who won 52.81% of the vote. She left office on January 11, 2011.

She most recently ran for office in the 2012 Texas House of Representatives election for the 43rd district against the incumbent, José Manuel Lozano, a former democratic party politician that had switched to the republican party in March 2012, shortly after redistricting had occurred which caused Lozano's district to lose territory in Kenedy, Willacy and Cameron counties. During her campaign, she criticized Lozano for his mistake in failing to report $55,000 in donations from republican party donors, referring to it as "a flagrant disregard for transparency."

== Electoral history ==
2004 Texas House of Representatives general election, November 2, 2004, District 35
Party	Candidate	Votes	%	±%
Democratic	Yvonne Gonzalez Toureilles	23,165	50.93%	n/a
Republican	Eric Opiela	22,316	49.07%	n/a
Total votes		45,481	100.00%	

2006 Texas House of Representatives general election, November 4, 2006, District 35
Party	Candidate	Votes	%	±%
Democratic	Yvonne Gonzalez Toureilles	16,042	52.68%	+1.75%
Republican	Michael Esparza	12,780	41.97%	n/a
Libertarian	Edward Elmer	1,623	5.33%	n/a
Total votes		30,445	100.00%	

2008 Texas House of Representatives general election, November 4, 2008, District 35
Party	Candidate	Votes	%	±%
Democratic	Yvonne Gonzalez Toureilles	29,458	100.00%	n/a
Total votes		29,458	100.00%	

2010 Texas House of Representatives general election, November 2, 2010, District 35
Party	Candidate	Votes	%	±%
Republican	Jose Aliseda	15,324	52.81%	n/a
Democratic	Yvonne Gonzalez Toureilles	13,692	47.18%	n/a
Total votes		29,016	100.00%	

2012 Texas House of Representatives democratic party primary election, May 29, 2012, District 43 Source:
Party	Candidate	Votes	%
Democratic	Yvonne Gonzalez Toureilles	7,585	70.59
Democratic	Gabriel Zamora	3,160	29.41
Total votes		10,745	100

2012 Texas House of Representatives general election, November 6, 2012, District 43 Source:
Party	Candidate	Votes	%
Republican	José Manuel Lozano	24,059	51.5
Democratic	Yvonne Gonzalez Toureilles	22,625	48.5
Total votes		46,684	100

Texas House of Representatives
Preceded by Gabi Canales	Member of the Texas House of Representatives from District 35 (Alice); 2005 - 2011	Succeeded by Jose Aliseda
