= Scott Hochberg =

American politician (born 1953)

Scott Hochberg (born October 2, 1953) is a former Democratic member of the Texas House of Representatives who represented two different districts in southwest Houston. From 1993 to 2003, he represented District 132, which included the Texas Medical Center, Rice University, the Astrodome, and neighborhoods including Meyerland, Hiram Clark, Southampton and Fondren Southwest. After the 2001 legislative redistricting, Hochberg then represented District 137, which included neighborhoods including Gulfton, Sharpstown, Briarmeadow, Shenandoah and Piney Point. Hochberg represented District 137 from 2003 to 2012.

== Early life ==
Hochberg was born in Houston on October 2, 1953, raised in the Chicago area, and returned to Houston to attend Rice University. After earning his master's degree in electrical engineering, he co-founded an electronic manufacturing firm that he headed for 12 years before selling his interest.

== Political activities ==
Hochberg served on the House Committee on Public Education during his entire time in the legislature, where he developed a reputation as one of the state's leading experts on the financing of public schools. He also served on various other committees, including the House Committee on State Affairs, the House Committee on Appropriations, and the House Committee on Corrections. He chaired the Education Subcommittee of the House Committee on Appropriations for six years, and served on the Select Committee on Public School Finance.

== Other activities ==
After announcing his retirement from office, Hochberg was appointed by Houston Mayor Annise Parker to lead the conversion of the City of Houston crime lab from a division of the Houston Police Department an independent local government corporation. Hochberg chaired the board of that corporation, the Houston Forensic Science Center, for three years, overseeing the successful transition.

Hochberg currently operates Postage Saver Software, a software development company. He also lectures on education policy at his alma mater, Rice University, and advises various organizations on public policy issues. Hochberg serves on the regional board of the Anti-Defamation League, and on the board of Project Grad Houston.

Scott Hochberg is the older brother of PBS NewsHour correspondent Lee Hochberg, NPR Morning Edition correspondent Adam Hochberg, and Jeff Hochberg.

Preceded by Paul Colbert	Member of the Texas House of Representatives from District 132 (Houston); 1993–2003	Succeeded by Bill Callegari
Preceded by Debra Danburg	Member of the Texas House of Representatives from District 137 (Houston); 2003-2013	Succeeded by Gene Wu
