= 2012 Texas House of Representatives election =

- November 6, 2012

All 150 seats in the Texas House of Representatives 76 seats needed for a majority
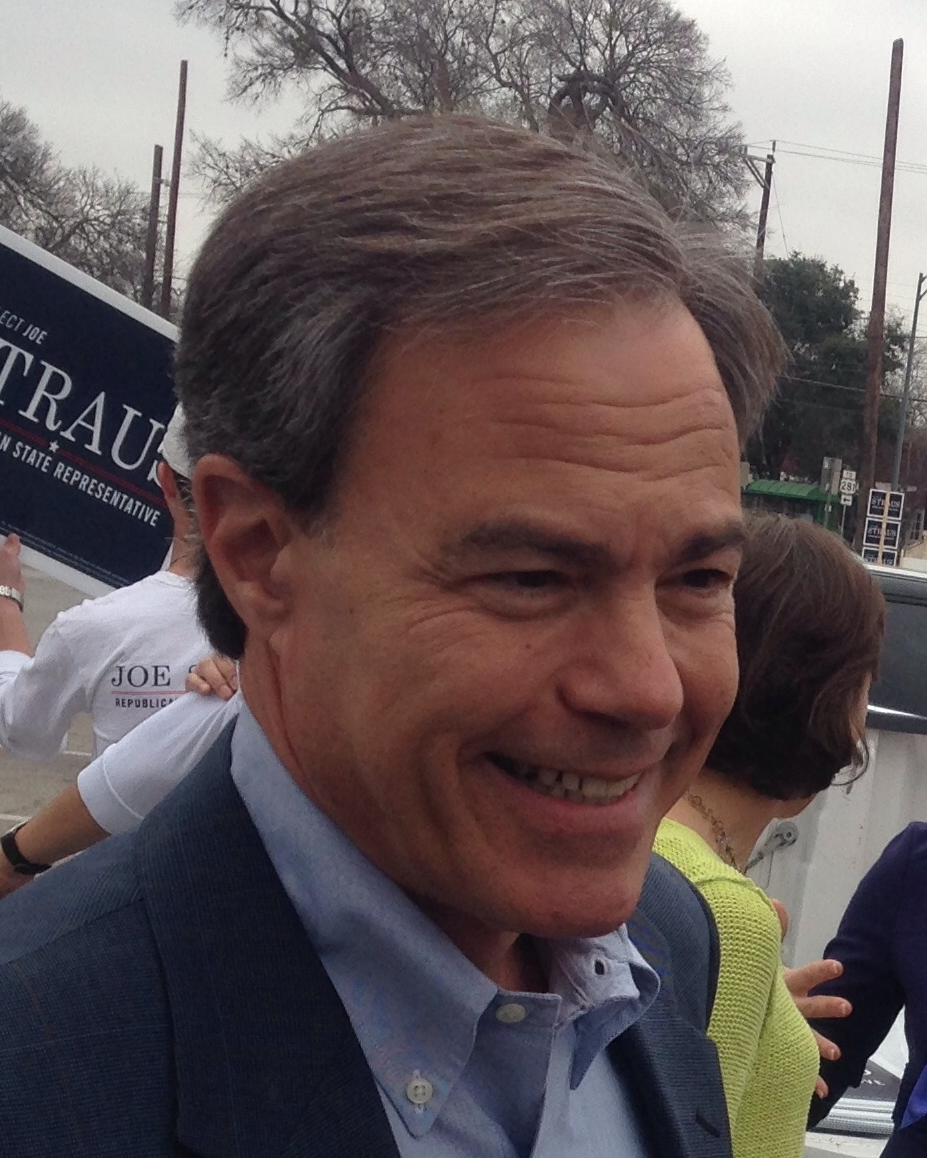

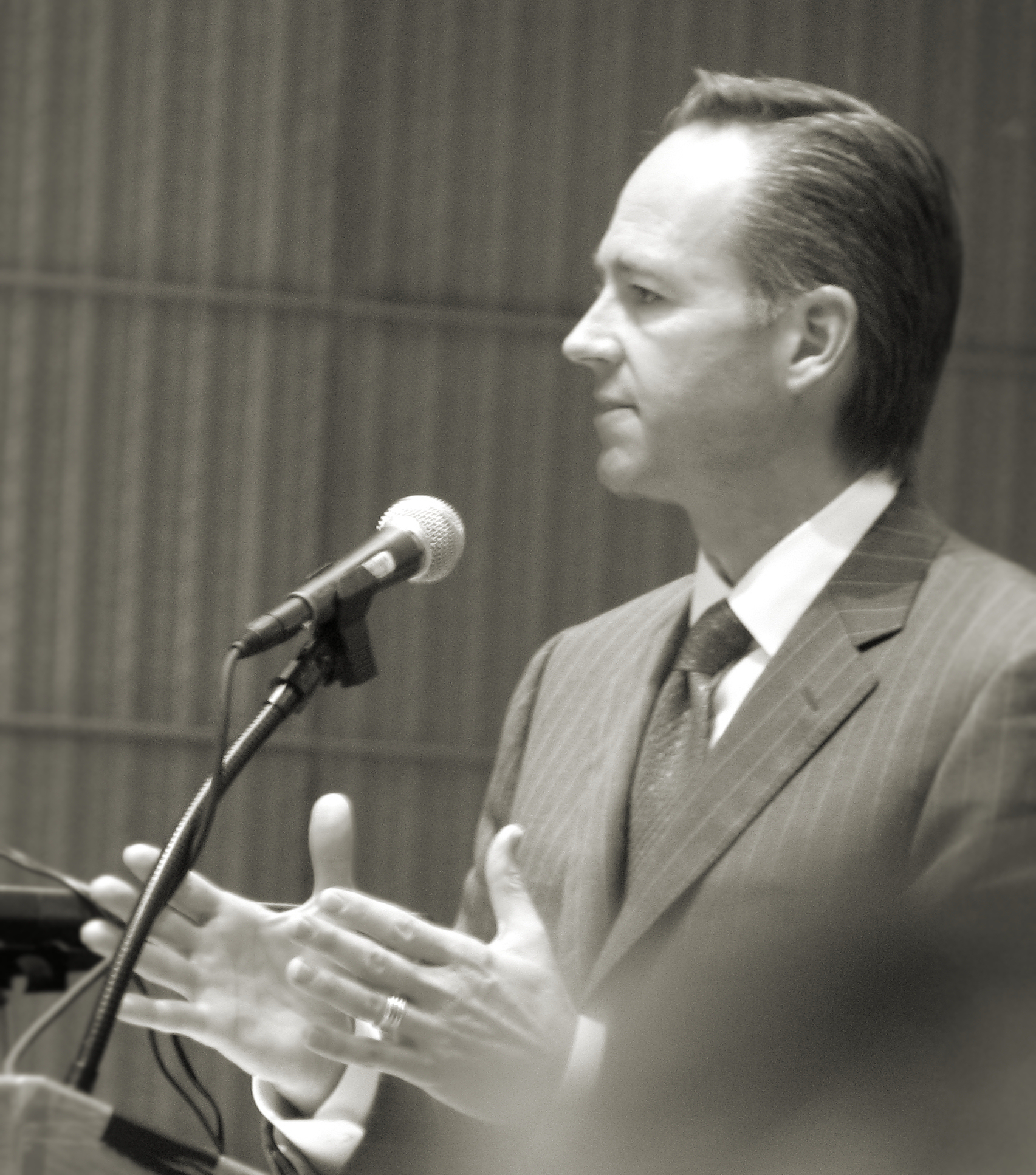
	Majority party	Minority party
Leader	Joe Straus	Craig Eiland
Party	Republican	Democratic
Leader since	January 13, 2009	January 9, 2007
Leader's seat	121st	23rd
Last election	99	51
Seats before	102	48
Seats won	95	55
Seat change	▼7	▲7
Popular vote	4,237,987	2,272,530
Percentage	62.37%	33.45%
Swing	▼2.19%	▲1.93%
- Republican hold Democratic hold Democratic gain Republican: 50–60% 60–70% 70–80% 80–90% ≥90% Democratic: 50–60% 60–70% 70–80% 80–90% ≥90%

The 2012 Texas House of Representatives elections took place as part of the biennial United States elections. Texas voters elected state senators in all 150 State House of Representatives districts. The winners of this election served in the 83rd Texas Legislature, with seats apportioned according to the 2010 United States census. State representatives serve for two-year terms.

At the beginning of the Eighty-second Texas Legislature following the 2010 Texas State House of Representatives elections, the Democrats held 49 seats to the Republicans' 101.

As of 2022, this is the last time Democrats won a state house seat in Chambers or Galveston county. This is also the first time a Republican has ever won a state house seat in Jefferson County (although the incumbent was a former Democrat who switched parties after winning re-election in 2010).

== Redistricting ==
Following the 2010 United States census, the Texas Legislature underwent its decennial redistricting. Due to Texas's shifting population from rural and urban areas to suburban areas, many rural representatives became vulnerable to having their districts moved across the state. Although Republicans had ousted almost every Democrat representing rural Texas in the 2010 elections, those gains were temporary, as many of the regions they won had lost population over the last decade. As such, it was seen as unlikely that Republicans would be able to draw maps that would allow them to maintain their supermajority in the chamber after the 2012 elections, despite their full control over the redistricting process.

Texas House of Representatives districts follow the "county line rule," effectively granting individual counties delegations of state house seats based on their population. The census found that Texas had a population of 25,145,561 in 2010, giving each district an "ideal population" of 167,637 people. In 2000, the "ideal population for a district" was 139,006 people. Counties with at least this number of people must fully contain at least one state house district. Counties with sufficient population for two or more districts must be divided into that number of districts. Should a county have sufficient population for one or more district plus a fraction of another, one district from another county may extend into it to represent the remaining population. District delegations for counties with at least one district changed as follows following the 2010 Census:

County	2000 pop.	Seats	Partial	2010 pop.	Seats	Partial	+/– W	+/– P
Bell County	238,000	1	Yes	310,235	1	Yes	Steady	Steady
Bexar County	1,393,035	10	No	1,714,773	10	No	Steady	Steady
Brazoria County	241,805	1	Yes	313,166	1	Yes	Steady	Steady
Brazos County	152,436	1	Yes	194,851	1	Yes	Steady	Steady
Cameron County	334,884	2	Yes	406,220	2	Yes	Steady	Steady
Collin County	491,272	3	Yes	782,341	4	Yes	▲1	Steady
Dallas County	2,216,808	16	No	2,368,139	14	No	▼2	Steady
Denton County	433,065	3	No	662,614	4	No	▲1	Steady
El Paso County	679,568	5	No	800,647	5	No	Steady	Steady
Fort Bend County	354,286	2	Yes	585,375	3	Yes	▲1	Steady
Galveston County	250,178	1	Yes	291,309	1	Yes	Steady	Steady
Harris County	3,401,139	25	No	4,092,459	24	No	▼1	Steady
Hidalgo County	569,099	4	No	774,769	4	Yes	Steady	▲
Jefferson County	251,968	1	Yes	252,273	1	Yes	Steady	Steady
Lubbock County	242,644	1	Yes	278,831	1	Yes	Steady	Steady
McLennan County	213,525	1	Yes	234,906	1	Yes	Steady	Steady
Montgomery County	293,779	2	Yes	455,746	2	Yes	Steady	Steady
Nueces County	313,512	2	Yes	340,223	2	No	Steady	▼
Smith County	174,861	1	Yes	209,714	1	Yes	Steady	Steady
Tarrant County	1,449,290	10	No	1,809,034	11	No	▲1	Steady
Travis County	811,776	6	No	1,024,266	6	No	Steady	Steady
Webb County	193,124	1	Yes	250,304	1	Yes	Steady	Steady
Williamson County	250,466	1	Yes	422,679	2	Yes	▲1	Steady

As a result of these changes, the following districts drastically moved:

1. District 33 moved from Nueces County to Collin County.
2. District 35 moved from South Texas to Hidalgo County.
3. District 85 moved from West Texas to Fort Bend County.
4. District 101 moved from Dallas County to Tarrant County.
5. District 106 moved from Dallas County to Denton County.
6. District 136 moved from Harris County to Williamson County.

== Predictions ==
Despite the rising Latino vote's potential to help the Democratic party and the falling approval ratings of Republican governor Rick Perry, analysts did not expect these to be enough to make the chamber remotely competitive.

Source	Ranking	As of
Governing	Safe R	Oct. 24, 2012

== Results ==
=== Statewide ===
Summary of the November 6, 2012 Texas House of Representatives election results
Party	Candi- dates	Votes	%	Seats	+/–
Republican Party	117	4,237,987	62.37%	95	▼7
Democratic Party	86	2,272,530	33.45%	55	▲7
Libertarian Party	38	230,008	3.9%	0	–
Green Party	13	53,189	0.78%	0	–
Write-in	1	715	0.01%	0	–
Total		6,794,519	100.00%	150	–

Popular vote
Republican	62.37%
Democratic	33.45%
Libertarian	3.39%
Green	0.78%
Write-in	0.01%

House seats won
Republican	63.33%
Democratic	36.67%

=== Close races ===
Seats where the margin of victory was under 10%:

1. District 107, 1.68%
2. District 105, 1.81%
3. District 43, 3.10%
4. District 144, 6.53% (gain)
5. District 117, 7.64% (gain)
6. District 78, 7.66% (gain)
7. District 23, 7.86%
8. District 114, 8.30%
9. District 134, 9.28%

=== Notable races ===
District 43: Representative J.M. Lozano (D-Kingsville) was re-elected as a Democrat in 2010 with 77.90% of the vote. On March 5, 2012, he announced that he would switch parties and seek re-election as a Republican. He would later go on to narrowly win re-election in 2012 with 51.55% of the vote.

Texas's 43rd state house district election
Party	Candidate	Votes	%
Republican	J.M. Lozano	24,074	51.55%
Democratic	Yvonne Gonzalez Toureilles	22.629	48.45%
Total votes		46,703	100.00%
Republican hold			

=== Results by district ===
District	Democratic		Republican		Others		Total		Result
District	Votes	%	Votes	%	Votes	%	Votes	%	Result
District 1	-	-	42,080	82.64%	8,839	17.36%	50,919	100.00%	Republican hold
District 2	-	-	46,025	100.00%	-	-	46,025	100.00%	Republican hold
District 3	-	-	46,383	100.00%	-	-	46,383	100.00%	Republican hold
District 4	-	-	44,181	100.00%	-	-	44,181	100.00%	Republican hold
District 5	-	-	46,204	100.00%	-	-	46,204	100.00%	Republican hold
District 6	-	-	42,499	88.76%	5,380	11.24%	47,879	100.00%	Republican hold
District 7	-	-	41,727	100.00%	-	-	41,727	100.00%	Republican hold
District 8	13,339	27.04%	35,996	72.96%	-	-	49,335	100.00%	Republican hold
District 9	-	-	49,027	98.56%	715	1.44%	49,742	100.00%	Republican hold
District 10	-	-	46,051	100.00%	-	-	46,051	100.00%	Republican hold
District 11	-	-	40,962	100.00%	-	-	40,962	100.00%	Republican hold
District 12	21,793	43.11%	28,762	56.89%	-	-	50,555	100.00%	Republican hold
District 13	-	-	53,503	100.00%	-	-	53,503	100.00%	Republican hold
District 14	14,614	36.22%	24,269	60.15%	1,463	3.63%	40,346	100.00%	Republican hold
District 15	-	-	57,520	86.64%	8,872	13.36%	66,392	100.00%	Republican hold
District 16	-	-	46,983	100.00%	-	-	46,983	100.00%	Republican hold
District 17	18,837	37.76%	31,055	62.24%	-	-	49,982	100.00%	Republican hold
District 18	-	-	38,703	100.00%	-	-	38,703	100.00%	Republican hold
District 19	-	-	51,674	100.00%	-	-	51,674	100.00%	Republican hold
District 20	-	-	51,554	100.00%	-	-	51,554	100.00%	Republican hold
District 21	-	-	51,104	100.00%	-	-	51,104	100.00%	Republican hold
District 22	40,467	100.00%	-	-	-	-	40,467	100.00%	Democratic hold
District 23	30,423	53.93%	25,987	46.07%	-	-	56,410	100.00%	Democratic hold
District 24	17,565	26.72%	48,177	73.28%	-	-	65,742	100.00%	Republican hold
District 25	-	-	41,421	100.00%	-	-	41,421	100.00%	Republican hold
District 26	22,662	37.03%	38,541	62.97%	-	-	61,203	100.00%	Republican hold
District 27	42,304	68.96%	18,119	29.54%	920	1.50%	61,343	100.00%	Democratic hold
District 28	-	-	44,932	100.00%	-	-	44,932	100.00%	Republican hold
District 29	21,388	34.48%	40,642	65.52%	-	-	62,030	100.00%	Republican hold
District 30	17,750	31.67%	38,304	68.33%	-	-	56,054	100.00%	Republican hold
District 31	27,856	66.29%	14,163	33.71%	-	-	42,019	100.00%	Democratic hold
District 32	-	-	35,094	100.00%	-	-	35,094	100.00%	Republican hold
District 33	-	-	50,631	85.34%	8,701	14.66%	59,332	100.00%	Republican hold
District 34	25,482	57.17%	19,088	42.83%	-	-	44,570	100.00%	Democratic gain
District 35	22,329	100.00%	-	-	-	-	22,329	100.00%	Democratic gain
District 36	23,385	100.00%	-	-	-	-	23,385	100.00%	Democratic hold
District 37	22,076	100.00%	-	-	-	-	22,076	100.00%	Democratic hold
District 38	22,408	70.76%	7,984	25.21%	1,274	4.02%	31,666	100.00%	Democratic hold
District 39	23,909	77.64%	6,886	22.36%	-	-	30,795	100.00%	Democratic hold
District 40	20,513	100.00%	-	-	-	-	20,513	100.00%	Democratic gain
District 41	20,963	61.73%	12,998	38.27%	-	-	33,961	100.00%	Democratic hold
District 42	30,018	100.00%	-	-	-	-	30,018	100.00%	Democratic hold
District 43	22,629	48.45%	24,074	51.55%	-	-	46,703	100.00%	Republican hold
District 44	-	-	49,930	100.00%	-	-	49,930	100.00%	Republican hold
District 45	26,557	42.39%	33,604	53.63%	2,495	3.98%	62,656	100.00%	Republican hold
District 46	35,560	86.45%	-	-	5,572	13.55%	41,132	100.00%	Democratic hold
District 47	31,294	36.93%	49,220	58.09%	4,216	4.98%	84,730	100.00%	Republican hold
District 48	46,512	59.20%	27,922	35.54%	4,134	5.26%	78,568	100.00%	Democratic hold
District 49	50,973	82.73%	-	-	10,640	17.27%	61,613	100.00%	Democratic hold
District 50	41,035	100.00%	-	-	-	-	41,035	100.00%	Democratic hold
District 51	32,878	88.17%	-	-	4,411	11.83%	37,289	100.00%	Democratic hold
District 52	-	-	31,991	70.28%	13,526	29.72%	45,517	100.00%	Republican hold
District 53		-	53,539	100.00%	-	-	53,539	100.00%	Republican hold
District 54	19,879	42.49%	26,910	57.51%	-	-	46,789	100.00%	Republican hold
District 55	-	-	32,153	100.00%	-	-	32,153	100.00%	Republican hold
District 56	-	-	38,528	79.47%	9,954	20.53%	48,482	100.00%	Republican hold
District 57	-	-	43,042	100.00%	-	-	43,042	100.00%	Republican hold
District 58	-	-	45,861	100.00%	-	-	45,861	100.00%	Republican hold
District 59	10,212	21.77%	36,706	78.23%	-	-	46,918	100.00%	Republican hold
District 60	-	-	55,404	100.00%	-	-	55,404	100.00%	Republican hold
District 61	-	-	55,737	88.91%	6,954	11.09%	62,691	100.00%	Republican hold
District 62	12,928	24.32%	40,219	75.68%	-		53,147	100.00%	Republican hold
District 63	-	-	51,500	85.31%	8,865	14.69%	60,365	100.00%	Republican hold
District 64	19,275	34.39%	34,245	61.10%	2,526	4.51%	56,046	100.00%	Republican hold
District 65	20,481	38.58%	31,386	59.12%	1,224	2.31%	53,091	100.00%	Republican hold
District 66	-	-	42,012	100.00%		-	42,012	100.00%	Republican hold
District 67	-	-	42,594	100.00%	-	-	42,594	100.00%	Republican hold
District 68	-	-	39,191	100.00%	-	-	39,191	100.00%	Republican hold
District 69	-	-	38,980	87.06%	5,795	12.94%	44,775	100.00%	Republican hold
District 70	-	-	46,997	100.00%	-	-	46,997	100.00%	Republican hold
District 71	-	-	44,271	100.00%	-	-	44,271	100.00%	Republican hold
District 72	-	-	43,886	100.00%	-	-	43,886	100.00%	Republican hold
District 73	-	-	64,029	88.20%	8,565	11.80%	72,594	100.00%	Republican hold
District 74	22,666	60.38%	14,870	39.62%	-		37,536	100.00%	Democratic hold
District 75	19,789	100.00%	-	-	-	-	19,789	100.00%	Democratic hold
District 76	27,050	100.00%	-	-	-	-	27,050	100.00%	Democratic hold
District 77	24,180	100.00%	-	-	-	-	24,180	100.00%	Democratic hold
District 78	22,650	53.83%	19,430	46.17%	-	-	42,080	100.00%	Democratic gain
District 79	27,832	100.00%	-	-	-	-	27,832	100.00%	Democratic hold
District 80	29,963	100.00%	-	-	-	-	29,963	100.00%	Democratic hold
District 81	-	-	34,154	100.00%	-	-	34,154	100.00%	Republican hold
District 82	-	-	42,572	100.00%	-	-	42,572	100.00%	Republican hold
District 83	-	-	49,332	100.00%	-	-	49,332	100.00%	Republican hold
District 84	-	-	33,179	82.58%	6,999	17.42%	40,178	100.00%	Republican hold
District 85	20,435	41.65%	28,626	58.35%	-	-	49,061	100.00%	Republican hold
District 86	-	-	53,287	100.00%	-	-	53,287	100.00%	Republican hold
District 87	9,567	22.71%	32,564	77.29%	-	-	42,131	100.00%	Republican hold
District 88	-	-	39,941	100.00%	-	-	39,941	100.00%	Republican hold
District 89	-	-	46,621	100.00%	-	-	46,621	100.00%	Republican hold
District 90	17,597	100.00%	-	-	-	-	17,597	100.00%	Democratic hold
District 91	-	-	40,058	100.00%	-	-	40,058	100.00%	Republican hold
District 92	-	-	37,084	80.67%	8,884	19.33%	45,968	100.00%	Republican hold
District 93	18,797	37.52%	29,527	58.95%	1,768	3.53%	50,092	100.00%	Republican hold
District 94	-	-	42,208	82.21%	9,133	17.79%	51,341	100.00%	Republican hold
District 95	37,594	77.36%	11,004	22.64%	-	-	48,598	100.00%	Democratic hold
District 96	-	-	36,940	80.53%	8,931	19.47%	45,871	100.00%	Republican hold
District 97	24,159	37.65%	38,139	59.43%	1,873	2.92%	64,171	100.00%	Republican hold
District 98	-	-	57,539	85.58%	9,694	14.42%	67,233	100.00%	Republican hold
District 99	16,763	30.21%	36,715	66.17%	2,009	3.62%	55,487	100.00%	Republican hold
District 100	34,965	100.00%	-	-	-	-	34,965	100.00%	Democratic hold
District 101	28,943	87.90%	-	-	3,984	12.10%	32,927	100.00%	Democratic gain
District 102	22,736	42.87%	30,303	57.13%	-	-	53,039	100.00%	Republican hold
District 103	22,287	100.00%	-	-	-	-	22,287	100.00%	Democratic hold
District 104	22,544	100.00%	-	-	-	-	22,544	100.00%	Democratic hold
District 105	20,923	48.26%	21,705	50.07%	725	1.67%	43,353	100.00%	Republican hold
District 106	-	-	41,785	83.17%	8,455	16.83%	50,240	100.00%	Republican hold
District 107	25,018	49.16%	25,868	50.84%	-	-	50,886	100.00%	Republican hold
District 108	-	-	43,675	79.69%	11,133	20.31%	54,808	100.00%	Republican hold
District 109	53,982	93.59%	-	-	3,700	6.41%	57,682	100.00%	Democratic hold
District 110	33,972	100.00%	-	-	-	-	33,972	100.00%	Democratic hold
District 111	47,498	100.00%	-	-	-	-	47,498	100.00%	Democratic hold
District 112	-	-	32,515	100.00%	-	-	32,515	100.00%	Republican hold
District 113	-	-	28,727	80.94%	6,763	19.06%	35,490	100.00%	Republican hold
District 114	28,762	45.85%	33,970	54.15%	-	-	62,732	100.00%	Republican hold
District 115	21,784	41.43%	29,082	55.31%	1,711	3.25%	52,577	100.00%	Republican hold
District 116	31,006	100.00%	-	-	-	-	31,006	100.00%	Democratic hold
District 117	22,397	53.82%	19,214	46.18%	-	-	41,611	100.00%	Democratic gain
District 118	23,992	59.85%	16,095	40.15%	-	-	40,087	100.00%	Democratic hold
District 119	25,130	61.89%	15,473	38.11%	-	-	40,603	100.00%	Democratic hold
District 120	33,756	87.89%	-	-	4,651	12.11%	38,407	100.00%	Democratic hold
District 121	-	-	50,530	80.24%	12,444	19.76%	62,974	100.00%	Republican hold
District 122	-	-	66,679	100.00%	-	-	66,679	100.00%	Republican hold
District 123	32,958	87.52%	-	-	4,700	12.48%	37,658	100.00%	Democratic hold
District 124	31,915	84.93%	-	-	5,661	15.07%	37,576	100.00%	Democratic hold
District 125	28,857	61.19%	17,501	37.11%	799	1.69%	47,157	100.00%	Democratic hold
District 126	-	-	40,311	100.00%	-	-	40,311	100.00%	Republican hold
District 127	19,435	29.79%	45,813	70.21%	-	-	65,248	100.00%	Republican hold
District 128	-	-	42,682	100.00%	-	-	42,682	100.00%	Republican hold
District 129	-	-	46,438	100.00%	-	-	46,438	100.00%	Republican hold
District 130	-	-	54,596	90.15%	5,967	9.85%	60,563	100.00%	Republican hold
District 131	36,765	94.50%	-	-	2,139	5.50%	38,904	100.00%	Democratic hold
District 132	-	-	33,592	80.69%	8,037	19.31%	41,629	100.00%	Republican hold
District 133	-	-	52,050	84.97%	9,210	15.03%	61,260	100.00%	Republican hold
District 134	36,480	45.36%	43,944	54.64%	-	-	80,424	100.00%	Republican hold
District 135	21,030	39.64%	32,023	60.36%	-	-	53,053	100.00%	Republican hold
District 136	24,851	40.72%	32,383	53.06%	3,802	6.23%	61,036	100.00%	Republican hold
District 137	15,832	65.76%	8,245	34.24%	-	-	24,077	100.00%	Democratic hold
District 138	-	-	29,645	80.45%	7,202	19.55%	36,847	100.00%	Republican hold
District 139	39,022	77.08%	11,604	22.92%	-	-	50,626	100.00%	Democratic hold
District 140	18,320	100.00%	-	-	-	-	18,320	100.00%	Democratic hold
District 141	33,180	87.85%	4,587	12.15%	-	-	37,767	100.00%	Democratic hold
District 142	34,010	100.00%	-	-	-	-	34,010	100.00%	Democratic hold
District 143	21,869	72.94%	8,112	27.06%	-	-	29,981	100.00%	Democratic hold
District 144	12,446	52.07%	10,885	45.54%	573	2.40%	23,904	100.00%	Democratic gain
District 145	20,892	100.00%	-	-	-	-	20,892	100.00%	Democratic hold
District 146	40,724	100.00%	-	-	-	-	40,724	100.00%	Democratic hold
District 147	43,589	92.21%	-	-	3,683	7.79%	47,272	100.00%	Democratic hold
District 148	25,964	85.96%	-	-	4,241	14.04%	30,205	100.00%	Democratic hold
District 149	26,017	61.12%	16,551	38.88%	-	-	42,568	100.00%	Democratic hold
District 150	19,343	30.32%	44,454	69.68%	-	-	63,797	100.00%	Republican hold
Total	2,272,530	33.45%	4,237,987	62.37%	283,912	4.18%	6,794,253	100.00%	Source:
