= Gabi Canales =

American politician

Member of the Texas House of Representatives from the 35th district
- In office January 14, 2003 – January 11, 2005
- Preceded by: Irma Lerma Rangel
- Succeeded by: Yvonne Gonzalez Toureilles

Personal details
- Party: Democratic
- Parent: Terry A. Canales (father)
- Relatives: Terry Canales (brother)
- Occupation: Attorney

Gabi Canales is an American politician and attorney. She is a former Democratic member of the Texas House of Representatives from the 35th district from 2003 to 2005.

== Election history ==
In 2002, incumbent Irma Rangel did not file for re-election. Canales ran in the Democratic primary held on March 12, 2002 and advanced to a primary runoff against Pearson Knolle. She won the runoff on April 9, 2002 with 57.9% of the vote, and defeated Republican Clark Welder in the November 5, 2002 general election, winning 52.34% of the vote. She assumed office on January 14, 2003.

In 2004, Canales was defeated in the Democratic primary runoff by Yvonne Gonzalez Toureilles, who won 72.9% of the vote in the runoff, and later won the general election with 50.93% of the vote. Canales left office on January 11, 2005.

Texas House of Representatives
Preceded by Irma Lerma Rangel	Member of the Texas House of Representatives from the District 35 (Alice); 2003 - 2005	Succeeded by Yvonne Gonzalez Toureilles
