= Danburg =

Danburg may refer to:

- Danburg, Georgia, an unincorporated community in Wilkes County, Georgia, United States
- Debra Danburg, American politician
