= Irma Lerma Rangel =

American politician

Member of the Texas House of Representatives from the 43rd district
- In office January 14, 2003 – March 18, 2003
- Preceded by: Tracy Ogden King
- Succeeded by: Juan Manuel Escobar

Member of the Texas House of Representatives from the 35th district
- In office January 12, 1993 – January 14, 2003
- Preceded by: Eddie Cavazos
- Succeeded by: Gabi Canales (Redistricting)

Member of the Texas House of Representatives from the 37th district
- In office January 11, 1983 – January 12, 1993
- Preceded by: Wilhelmina Ruth Delco
- Succeeded by: René Orlando Oliveira (Redistricting)

Member of the Texas House of Representatives from the 49th district
- In office January 11, 1977 – January 11, 1983
- Preceded by: Greg Montoya
- Succeeded by: Gerald Hill (Redistricting)

Personal details
- Born: May 15, 1931 Starr County, Texas, U.S.
- Died: March 18, 2003 (aged 71) Austin, Texas, U.S.
- Resting place: Texas State Cemetery
- Party: Democratic
- Education: Texas A&M University–Kingsville; St. Mary's University Law School
- Occupation: Activist, educator, lawyer

Irma Lerma Rangel (May 15, 1931 – March 18, 2003) was an attorney and Democratic state legislator based in Kingsville, Texas. She was the first Mexican-American woman elected to serve in the Texas House of Representatives and the first Mexican-American female attorney in Kingsville.

== Life ==
She was the youngest of three daughters. Her father, Presciliano Martinez Rangel, from Duval County, had been orphaned at an early age and was able to attend school for only one year. Her mother, Herminia Lerma, moved with her parents from Starr County to Kingsville. Presciliano worked in farming, ranching, construction, and business. He became a merchant and owned an appliance store, a furniture store, a plumbing service, two barber shops, and a bar. He helped his wife build a successful dress shop located just off the main street of Kingsville, not restricted to the "Mexican side" of town. In 1947, when Rangel was a teenager, her parents were able to buy some land near Texas College of Arts and Industries and hoped to build a home. But the land was in the "Anglo-white" district and the neighbors organized against allowing a "Mexican" family to build in their neighborhood. Ultimately, the family was allowed to design and build the Spanish Colonial style house across from the college campus that Rangel called home until her dying day. Rangel and her sisters grew up in Kingsville, attending the Mexican Ward School for the elementary grades, and the town's only integrated high school.

Rangel and her youngest sister decided to attend the Texas College of Arts and Industries, now Texas A&M University–Kingsville. After graduating with degrees in education, Rangel began teaching in the neighboring community of Robstown. Then she and her oldest sister, Olga, decided to become teachers in an overseas program in Venezuela. This determination to be of service to society and fight for good causes impelled Rangel to return to Texas and attend St. Mary's University Law School. She went on to become one of the first Hispanic female law clerks. After her clerkship with U.S. District Judge Adrian Spears, she became one of the first Hispanic women assistant district attorneys in Texas by working in the District Attorney's office in Nueces County. She returned to Kingsville, where she opened her own law practice and was the only Hispanic woman attorney in the city.

== Career in politics ==
In 1974, Rangel began her life in politics by running for, and winning, the chairmanship of the Kleberg County Democratic Party. She had more ambitious goals and decided to run for a seat in the Texas House of Representatives. She ran for and won the seat that would make her the only Hispanic woman in the legislature. On January 11, 1977, Rangel was sworn in as a member of the Texas House of Representatives from the 49th district. In 1993, she closed her successful law practice in order to serve her district as a legislator full-time. Upon her death on March 17, 2003, the Mexican American Legislative Caucus of the Texas House issued a news release, which summarized her legislative career. In 1993, she secured $460 million for the South Texas Border Initiative. In the last legislative session, Representative Rangel passed a bill creating the first professional school in South Texas — Texas A&M Health Science Center - Irma Lerma Rangel College of Pharmacy. In 1995, Speaker Pete Laney appointed Rangel Chair of the Texas House Committee on Higher Education.

As the first Mexican-American to head the committee, Rangel led the charge to ensure educational opportunities for all children. Rangel joint-authored and sponsored legislation creating the TEXAS Grant I and Grant II Programs, which have allocated millions of dollars in financial support to low-income students. In response to the Hopwood v. Texas decision, which ended affirmative action at all state colleges and universities, Rangel pioneered landmark legislation in 1997 (House Bill 588) which requires state colleges and universities to admit automatically all students who graduate in the top 10 percent of their high school class.

In 1994, Rangel was inducted into the Texas Women's Hall of Fame. GEMS television named her Woman of the Year in 1997. In 1998, Rangel became the first Mexican American to receive the Mirabeau B. Lamar Medal from the Association of Texas Colleges and Universities.

== Death and legacy ==
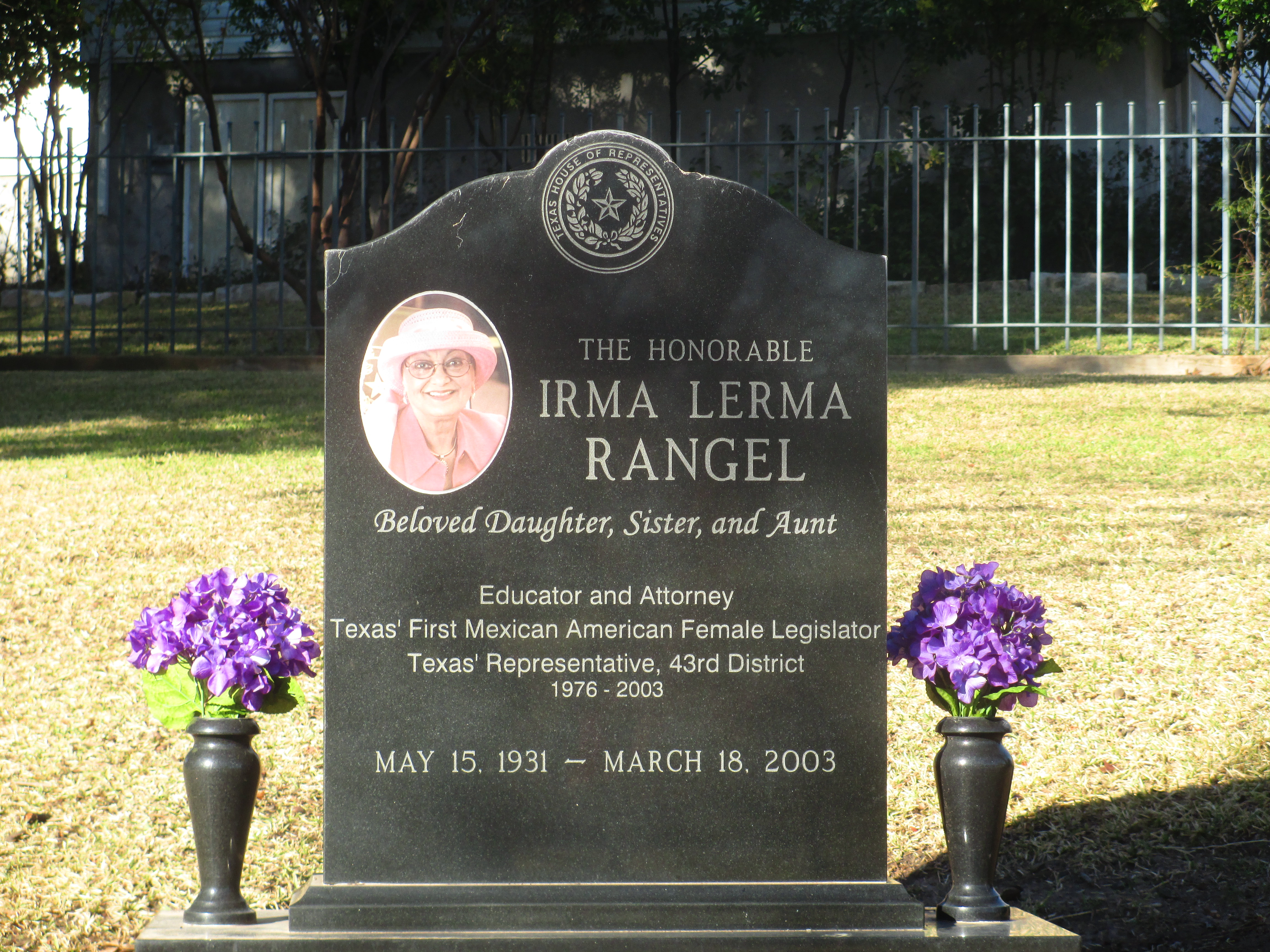
Rangel grave marker at the Texas State Cemetery in Austin

Rangel died of breast cancer (as well as ovarian and brain cancers) on March 18, 2003. Her legislative collection is stored at the South Texas Archives and Special Collections at Texas A&M University-Kingsville. Cecilia Aros Hunter, professor and university archivist, was a personal family friend for more than thirty years. The collection consists mainly of legislative papers created while Rangel served in the Texas State Legislature for almost twenty-six years and papers left in her law office in Kingsville.

Irma Lerma Rangel Young Women's Leadership School became the first all-girls public school in the State of Texas. Established in collaboration with the Young Women's Preparatory Network and the Dallas Independent School District it serves grades 6th through 12th.

The Texas A&M University Irma Lerma Rangel School of Pharmacy is named in her honor due to Texas Education Code § 89.051, which requires "Irma Rangel" to be part of its official name.

Texas House of Representatives
Preceded by Gregory Montoya	Member of the Texas House of Representatives from District 49 (Kingsville); 1977–1983	Succeeded by Gerald Wayne Hill

Preceded by Wilhelmina Ruth Delco	Member of the Texas House of Representatives from District 37 (Kingsville); 1983–1993	Succeeded by René Orlando Oliveira

Preceded by Eddie Cavazos	Member of the Texas House of Representatives from District 35 (Kingsville); 1993–2003	Succeeded by Gabi Canales

Preceded by Tracy Ogden King	Member of the Texas House of Representatives from District 43 (Kingsville); 2003	Succeeded by Juan Manuel Escobar
