= Alamia =

Alamia is a surname. Notable people with the surname include:

- Juan Alamia (c. 1876–1913), American soldier who fought in the Spanish–American War
- Gennady Alamia (born 1949), Abkhazian poet, politician, and playwright
- Laisa Alamia (born 1971/72), Filipino politician and lawyer
