= Terry Canales =

American politician

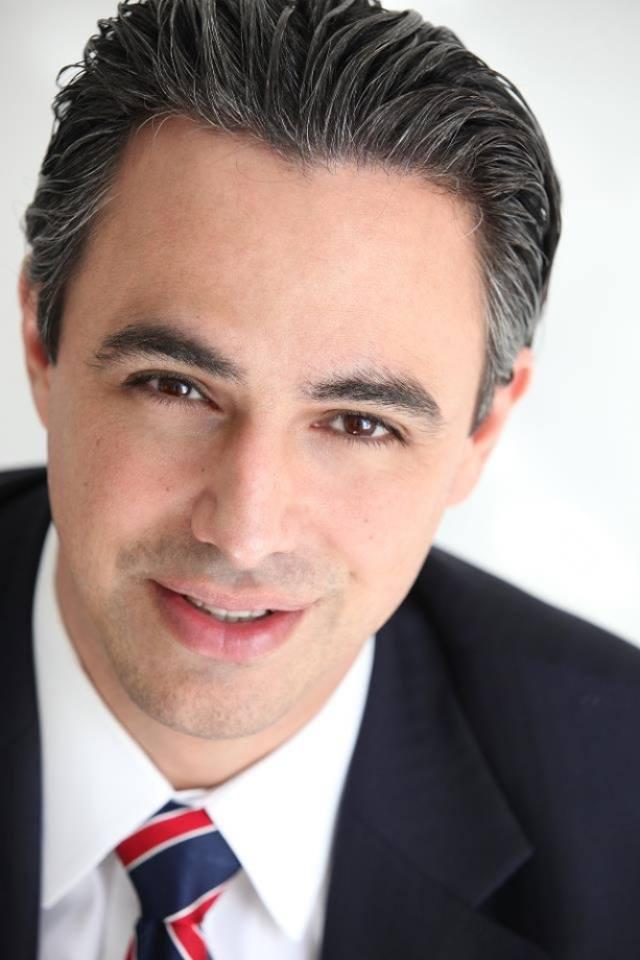

Member of the Texas House of Representatives from the 40th district
- Incumbent
- Assumed office January 8, 2013
- Preceded by: Aaron Peña

Personal details
- Born: January 1, 1979 (age 47) Edinburg, Texas, U.S.
- Party: Democratic
- Spouse: Erica Canales
- Children: 5
- Education: University of the Incarnate Word(BA); St. Mary's University School of Law(JD)
- Occupation: Attorney
- Website: Campaign website

Terry Canales is a Democratic member of the Texas House of Representatives, serving since 2013. He was elected to the House of Representatives in 2012 to represent District 40, which encompasses the heart of Hidalgo County. The cities within District 40 include the cities of Edinburg (Hidalgo County seat), Elsa, César Chávez, Murillo, La Coma Heights, San Carlos, La Blanca, Linn, Lopezville, and portions of McAllen, Pharr, and San Juan.

== Biography ==
Terry Canales was born in Hidalgo County and is a native of South Texas. He earned his Bachelor’s Degree in Political Science and Government from the University of the Incarnate Word. Following in the footsteps of his father Terry A. Canales, a former State District Judge, and his uncle Arnulfo Gonzalez Jr., he graduated from St. Mary's University School of Law, earning his Juris Doctor by the age of 24. Upon passing the Texas State Bar Exam, Canales opened his own law practice in Edinburg, Texas. He specializes in Oil and Gas litigation, Criminal Defense, Personal Injury, Family Law, Real Estate, and Municipal Law.

His father, Terry A. Canales, was the first Hispanic state representative to represent Jim Wells County, serving from 1973 to 1977. His sister Gabriella "Gabi" Canales served in the Texas House from 2003 to 2005. He is also the sixth member of his extended family to serve in the Texas House of Representatives. Canales's great uncle, José Tomás Canales, was a Brownsville Democrat who served a total of five terms between 1905 and 1921. He was a founding member of the League of United Latin American Citizens (LULAC), and is most famous for defending the Hispanic community against the injustices perpetrated by the Texas Rangers.

== Texas House of Representatives ==
In 2019, Canales was appointed by Texas Speaker of the House Dennis Bonnen to serve as Chairman of the Texas House Committee on Transportation, the first Latino to hold that position. In 2021 and again in 2023, he was appointed by Texas Speaker of the House Dade Phelan to serve as Chairman of the Texas House Committee on Transportation.

In 2025, Canales was appointed by Texas Speaker of the House Dustin Burrows to serve as Chairman of the House Subcommittee on Transportation Funding. Canales oversees funding sources, including the State Highway Fund, transportation debt financing, including the Texas Mobility Fund, and alternative transportation funding options.

From 2021-2025, Canales served as a member of the Texas Sunset Advisory Commission. He was the lead author on the Sunset bill for the Texas Department of Criminal Justice (TDCJ), House Bill 1515, in the 89th Legislative Session.

In 2023, Canales was one of the twelve House impeachment managers in the impeachment trial of Texas Attorney General Ken Paxton in the Texas State Senate.

== Legislative Committees ==
Canales is currently serving as a member of the following committees:

- Subcommittee on Transportation Funding, Chair
- Transportation, Member
- Homeland Security, Public Safety & Veterans' Affairs, Member
- Calendars, Member

== Election History ==
=== 2012 ===
Texas General Election 2012: House District 40
Party	Candidate	Votes	%	±%
Democratic	Terry Canales	20,513	100.00	0.00

=== 2014 ===
Texas General Election 2014: House District 40
Party	Candidate	Votes	%	±%
Democratic	Terry Canales	11,998	100.00	0.00

=== 2016 ===
Texas General Election 2016: House District 40
Party	Candidate	Votes	%	±%
Democratic	Terry Canales	23,227	73.8	−26.2
Republican	Mari De Leon	8,225	26.2	0.0

=== 2018 ===
Texas General Election 2018: House District 40
Party	Candidate	Votes	%	±%
Democratic	Terry Canales	24,252	100.00	+26.2

=== 2020 ===
Texas General Election 2020: House District 40
Party	Candidate	Votes	%	±%
Democratic	Terry Canales	34,576	100.00	0.0

=== 2022 ===
Texas Primary Election 2022: House District 40
Party	Candidate	Votes	%	±%
Democratic	Terry Canales	8,662	100.00	0.0

=== 2024 ===
Texas General Election 2024: House District 40
Party	Candidate	Votes	%	±%
Democratic	Terry Canales	34,671	100.00	0.0

== Personal life ==
Canales is married to Erica Canales, a realtor and member of the Hidalgo County Tax Appraisal District Board. They have three sons and two daughters.
