= Jose Aliseda =

American politician

Member of the Texas House of Representatives from the 35th district
- In office January 11, 2011 – January 8, 2013
- Preceded by: Yvonne Gonzalez Toureilles
- Succeeded by: Oscar Longoria

Personal details
- Party: Republican
- Education: University of Texas School of Law (JD)
- Occupation: Attorney

Jose Aliseda is an American politician and attorney. He was a former Republican member of the Texas House of Representatives from the 35th district from 2011 to 2013.

== Election history ==
In 2010, Aliseda ran unopposed in the Republican party primary. On November 2, 2010, he defeated the incumbent, Yvonne Gonzalez Toureilles, a Democrat, in the general election. Aliseda won 52.81% of the vote. He assumed office on January 11, 2011. Aliseda did not file for re-election in 2012. He was succeeded by Oscar Longoria on January 8, 2013.

Texas House of Representatives
Preceded by Yvonne Gonzalez Toureilles	Member of the Texas House of Representatives from District 35 (Beeville); 2011 - 2013	Succeeded by Oscar Longoria
