= Juan Escobar =

Juan Escobar may refer to:

- Juan Marcelo Escobar (born 1995)
- Juan Carlos Escobar (born 1982), Colombian footballer
- Juan Francisco Escobar (born 1949), Paraguayan football referee
- Juan Manuel Escobar, Texas politician and judge
