= Gene Wu =

American lawyer and politician (born 1978)

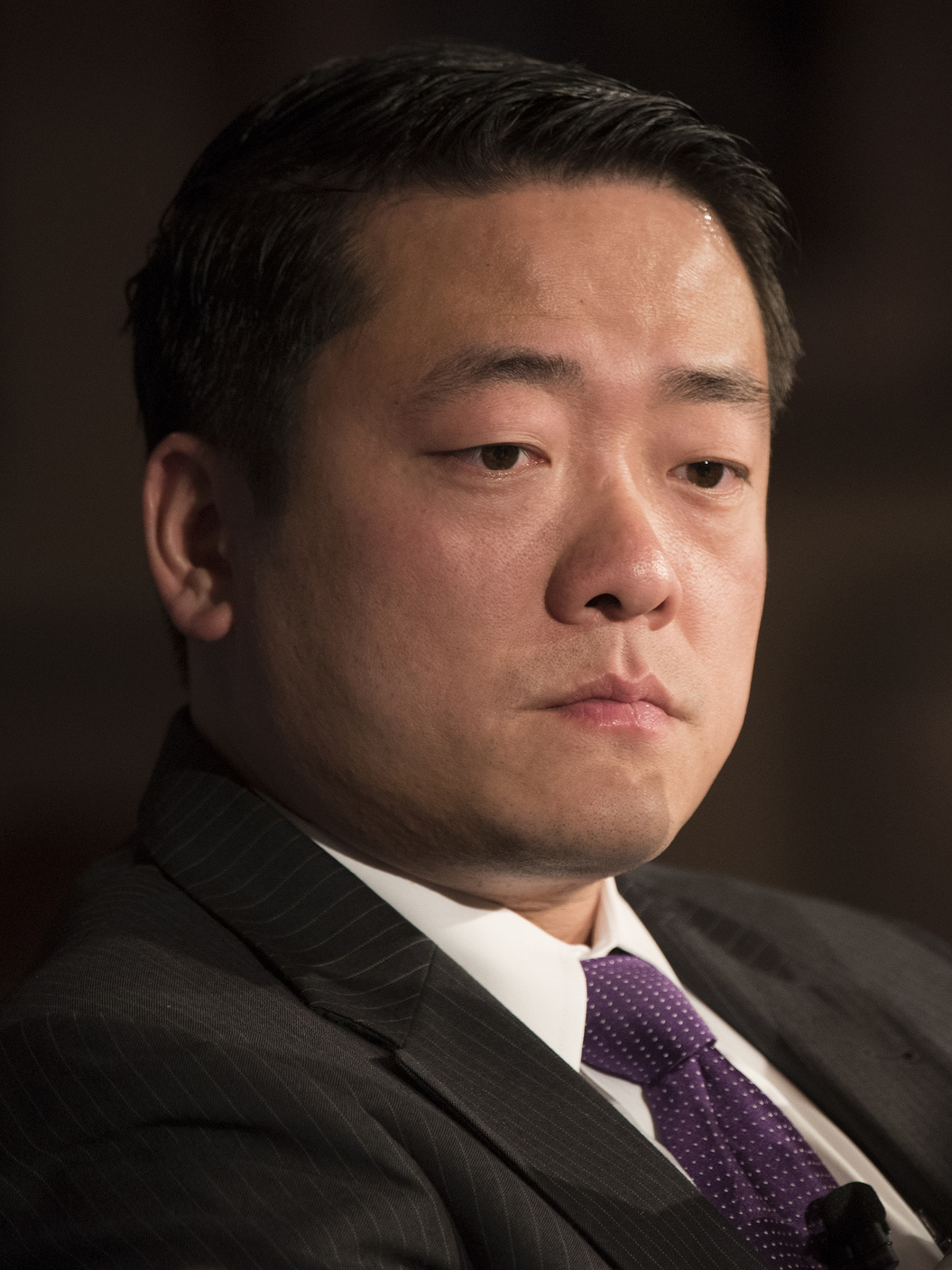
- Wu in 2017

Minority Leader of the Texas House of Representatives
- Incumbent
- Assumed office January 14, 2025
- Preceded by: Trey Martinez Fischer

Member of the Texas House of Representatives from the 137th district
- Incumbent
- Assumed office January 8, 2013
- Preceded by: Scott Hochberg

Personal details
- Born: Eugene Yuanzhi Wu; March 23, 1978 (age 48) Guangzhou, Guangdong, China
- Party: Democratic
- Spouse: Miya Shay (m. 2012)
- Children: 2
- Education: Texas A&M University (BS); University of Texas at Austin (MPA); South Texas College of Law (JD)
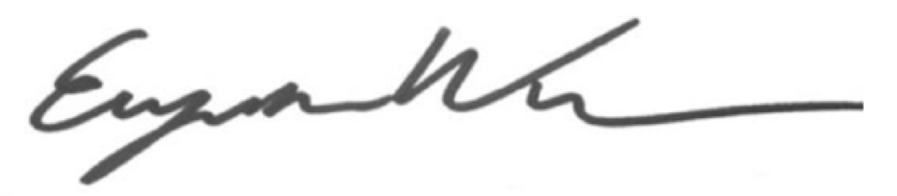
- Signature
- Website: Office website Campaign website

Chinese name
- Traditional Chinese: 吳元之
- Simplified Chinese: 吴元之
Transcriptions
Standard Mandarin
- Hanyu Pinyin: Wú Yuánzhī
Yue: Cantonese
- Jyutping: Ng4 Jyun4 Zi1

Eugene Yuanzhi Wu (Chinese: 吳元之; born March 23, 1978) is an American lawyer and politician who has represented Texas's 137th House of Representatives district in the Texas House of Representatives since 2013. A member of the Democratic Party, he was elected minority leader of the Texas House for the 89th Legislature in 2024, succeeding Trey Martinez Fischer. Before his election to the legislature, Wu worked as a prosecutor in the Harris County district attorney's office and later as a private-practice attorney in Houston.

== Early life and education ==
Wu was born in the city of Guangzhou in Guangdong province, China, and immigrated to the United States with his family as a young child. His family first lived in Odessa, Texas, before settling in southwest Houston, including the Sharpstown community area.

Wu attended Ed White Elementary School, Fondren Middle School, and St. Thomas' Episcopal School, all in Houston. He received a Bachelor of Science from Texas A&M University, a Master of Public Affairs from the University of Texas at Austin, and a Juris Doctor from South Texas College of Law Houston.

== Texas House of Representatives ==
Wu was elected to the Texas House of Representatives in 2012 to represent District 137, a diverse, heavily urban district in southwest Houston that includes parts of Sharpstown and Alief. He took office on January 8, 2013, succeeding longtime Democratic representative Scott Hochberg, and has been re‑elected in each subsequent cycle.

Wu’s legislative work has focused on public education, juvenile justice and criminal justice reform, child welfare, and issues affecting immigrant communities, particularly in Houston’s southwest corridor. Commentators have noted his frequent role in debates over immigration enforcement, voting and redistricting legislation, and proposals affecting Asian American and other minority communities in Texas.

In the 89th Legislature, Wu serves as vice chair of the House Committee on Criminal Jurisprudence and sits on the Appropriations Committee, the Appropriations Subcommittee on Articles I, IV, and V, and select and standing committees related to redistricting and congressional maps. In prior sessions he has served on committees including Human Services, Energy Resources, Elections, County Affairs, Juvenile Justice and Family Issues, and Pensions, Investments and Financial Services.

In December 2024, House Democrats chose Wu to lead their caucus for the 89th Legislature, replacing Trey Martinez Fischer as chair. As caucus chair, he led a 2025 walkout by House Democrats during a special session on mid‑decade congressional redistricting, denying the chamber a quorum and briefly delaying passage of Republican‑backed maps.

Governor Greg Abbott subsequently filed an emergency petition with the Supreme Court of Texas seeking Wu’s removal from office, arguing that his absence and the quorum break amounted to abandoning his duties; Attorney General Ken Paxton and other Republican officials pursued related legal actions against Democratic members. Wu and the other absent Democrats returned to Austin later that month for a subsequent special session, after which new congressional maps were approved and signed into law, prompting further redistricting battles and litigation in Texas and other states ahead of the 2026 midterm elections. In May 2026, the Texas Supreme Court ruled that it did not have jurisdiction in the case to remove Wu and the other absent members from office.

=== Committee positions ===
==== Current ====
- Appropriations
  - Subcommittee on Articles I, IV, and V
- Congressional Redistricting, Select
- Criminal Jurisprudence (Vice Chair)
  - Subcommittee on Juvenile Justice
- Redistricting

==== Previous ====
- Appropriations
  - Subcommittee on Article II
  - Subcommittee on Article III
  - Subcommittee on State Infrastructure, Resiliency, and Investment (Vice Chair)
- County Affairs
- Elections
- Energy Resources
- Federal Environmental Regulation, Select
- Human Services
- Juvenile Justice and Family Issues
- Pensions, Investments, and Financial Services
- Recruitment of Firearms and Ammunition Manufacturers

== Electoral history ==
2024 Texas House of Representatives 137th district general election
Party	Candidate	Votes	%
Democratic	Gene Wu (Incumbent)	19,286	76.31
Libertarian	Lee Sharp	5,988	23.69
Total votes		25,274	100.0
Democratic hold			

2022 Texas House of Representatives 137th district general election
Party	Candidate	Votes	%
Democratic	Gene Wu (Incumbent)	14,451	76.02
Libertarian	Lee Sharp	4,559	23.98
Total votes		19,010	100.0
Democratic hold			

2020 Texas House of Representatives 137th district general election
Party	Candidate	Votes	%
Democratic	Gene Wu (Incumbent)	23,502	81.48
Libertarian	Lee Sharp	5,342	18.52
Total votes		28,844	100.0
Democratic hold			

2018 Texas House of Representatives 137th district general election
Party	Candidate	Votes	%
Democratic	Gene Wu (Incumbent)	17,616	88.28
Libertarian	Lee Sharp	2,338	11.72
Total votes		19,954	100.0
Democratic hold			

2016 Texas House of Representatives 137th district general election
Party	Candidate	Votes	%
Democratic	Gene Wu (Incumbent)	18,088	66.99
Republican	Kendall L. Baker	8,178	30.29
Libertarian	Dan Biggs	735	2.72
Total votes		27,001	100.0
Democratic hold			

2016 Texas House of Representatives 137th district primary election
Party	Candidate	Votes	%
Democratic	Gene Wu (Incumbent)	2,957	64.73
Democratic	Edward Pollard	1,611	35.27
Total votes		4,568	100.0

2014 Texas House of Representatives 137th district general election
Party	Candidate	Votes	%
Democratic	Gene Wu (Incumbent)	7,155	57.86
Republican	Morad H. Fiki	5,211	42.14
Total votes		12,373	100.0
Democratic hold			

2012 Texas House of Representatives 137th district general election
Party	Candidate	Votes	%
Democratic	Gene Wu	15,832	65.76
Republican	M.J. Khan	8,245	34.24
Total votes		24,077	100.0
Democratic hold			

2012 Texas House of Representatives 137th district primary runoff election
Party	Candidate	Votes	%
Democratic	Gene Wu	696	61.54
Democratic	Jamaal Smith	435	38.46
Total votes		1,131	100.0

2012 Texas House of Representatives 137th district primary election
Party	Candidate	Votes	%
Democratic	Gene Wu	773	43.14
Democratic	Jamaal Smith	431	24.05
Democratic	Joseph Carlos Madden	391	21.82
Democratic	Sarah Winkler	197	10.99
Total votes		1,792	100.0

== Personal life ==
Wu is married to Miya Shay, a television journalist for ABC 13 in Houston, Texas. The couple married in 2012 and have two sons.

== See also ==
- History of Chinese Americans in Houston

Texas House of Representatives
Preceded by Trey Martinez Fischer	Minority Leader of the Texas House of Representatives; 2025–present	Incumbent
