= Oscar Longoria =

American politician

Member of the Texas House of Representatives from the 35th district
- Incumbent
- Assumed office January 8, 2013
- Preceded by: Jose Aliseda

Personal details
- Born: Oscar Lee Longoria Jr. October 2, 1981 (age 44) Mission, Texas, U.S.
- Party: Democratic
- Spouse: Jennifer Ruiz
- Education: South Texas College; University of Texas at Austin (BS) (JD)
- Occupation: Attorney, politician
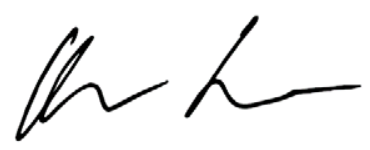
- Signature
- Website: http://oscarlongoria.com

Oscar Lee Longoria Jr. (born October 2, 1981) is an American attorney and Democratic member of the Texas House of Representatives, serving since 2013. He was elected to the Texas House of Representatives in 2012 to represent District 35, which encompasses both Hidalgo County and Cameron County. The district includes the cities of La Joya, Sullivan City, Peñitas, Palmview, Palmhurst, Alton, Mission, McAllen, Edinburg, Linn, Hargill, Monte Alto, Edcouch, La Villa, Weslaco, Donna, Mercedes, Santa Rosa, La Feria, Santa Maria, Primera, Los Indios, Olmito, Rangerville, Bluetown, San Benito, and Brownsville.

== Biography ==
Longoria was born in Mission and raised in South Texas. He attended the La Joya Independent School District. Longoria attended South Texas College for two years before transferring to the University of Texas at Austin, where he graduated in 2003 with a Bachelor of Science in Communication Studies. In 2007, Longoria graduated with his Doctorate of Jurisprudence from the University of Texas School of Law. Longoria has previously served on the Agua Special Utility District as a board member and is also a former member of the board of trustees for South Texas College.

== Legal career ==
Longoria owns and operates the Law Office of Oscar Longoria. He is licensed to practice law in Texas, including in the United States District Court for the Southern District of Texas. He specializes in criminal defense, personal injury, and storm damage claims. Longoria is a member of the Hidalgo County Bar Association, and the Hidalgo County Young Lawyers Association.

== Texas House of Representatives ==
In 2017 and again in 2019, Texas Speaker of the House Joe Straus appointed Longoria as Vice Chairman of the House Appropriations Committee. In 2023, he was appointed by Texas Speaker of the House Dade Phelan as Chairman of the House Business & Industry Committee. In 2025, Texas Speaker of the House Dustin Burrows appointed him as Chairman of the Subcommittee on Workforce.

In 2023, Longoria was one of twelve House impeachment managers in the trial of Texas Attorney General Ken Paxton in the Texas State Senate. At the time, he was a member of the House General Investigating Committee, which brought the charges of misconduct against Paxton leading to his impeachment in the Texas House.

== Legislative Committees ==
Longoria is currently serving as a member of the following committees:

- Subcommittee on Workforce, Chair
- Subcommittee on International Relations, Vice Chair
- Trade, Workforce & Economic Development, Member
- Licensing & Administrative Procedures, Member

== Election History ==
=== 2012 ===
Texas Primary Election 2012: House District 35
Party	Candidate	Votes	%	±%
Democratic	Oscar Longoria	5,632	55.2	0.00
Democratic	Gus Ruiz	4,580	44.8	0.0

=== 2014 ===
Texas General Election 2014: House District 35
Party	Candidate	Votes	%	±%
Democratic	Oscar Longoria	7,348	100	0.00

=== 2016 ===
Texas General Election 2016: House District 35
Party	Candidate	Votes	%	±%
Democratic	Oscar Longoria	25,812	100	0.00

=== 2018 ===
Texas General Election 2018: House District 35
Party	Candidate	Votes	%	±%
Democratic	Oscar Longoria	23,351	100	0.00

=== 2020 ===
Texas General Election 2020: House District 35
Party	Candidate	Votes	%	±%
Democratic	Oscar Longoria	31,195	100	0.00

=== 2022 ===
Texas General Election 2022: House District 35
Party	Candidate	Votes	%	±%
Democratic	Oscar Longoria	15,569	64.2	−35.8
Republican	Oscar Rosa	8,690	35.8	0.0

=== 2024 ===
Texas General Election 2024: House District 35
Party	Candidate	Votes	%	±%
Democratic	Oscar Longoria	25,896	100	+35.8

== Personal life ==
Longoria is married to Jennifer Ruiz-Longoria of Mission. In 2018, Longoria was awarded the University of Texas at Austin’s Outstanding Texas Ex Award due to Longoria's work representing Hidalgo and Cameron County.
