= Veronica Gonzales =

American politician

Member of the Texas House of Representatives from the 41st district
- In office January 11, 2005 – June 30, 2012
- Preceded by: Roberto Gutierrez
- Succeeded by: Robert Guerra

Personal details
- Born: 1963 or 1964 (age 62–63)
- Party: Democratic
- Education: J.D., University of Texas at Austin

Veronica Gonzales (born 1963 or 1964) is an American politician. She served in the Texas House of Representatives from 2005 to 2012, representing the 41st district.

== Career ==
Prior to entering politics, Gonzales worked as a lawyer.

Gonzales was first elected in 2004, winning the Democratic primary election in a run-off against incumbent Roberto Gutierrez. She won unopposed in the general election. She won unopposed in 2006, and won re-election in 2008 and 2010.

On June 30, 2012, Gonzales resigned from her position as state legislator in order to accept the position of vice president for university advancement at the University of Texas–Pan American. A special election was called to replace her, but cancelled after only one candidate filed to run. Robert Guerra, the only candidate, was sworn in on September 25, 2012, to represent the 41st district for the remainder of Gonzales' term.

== Personal life ==
Gonzales was raised in San Marcos, Texas. She is the niece of former San Marcos mayor Luciano Flores.

She attended college at Texas State University, and received her Juris Doctor from the University of Texas at Austin.
