= Aaron Peña =

American politician

Lionel Aron Peña, Jr.
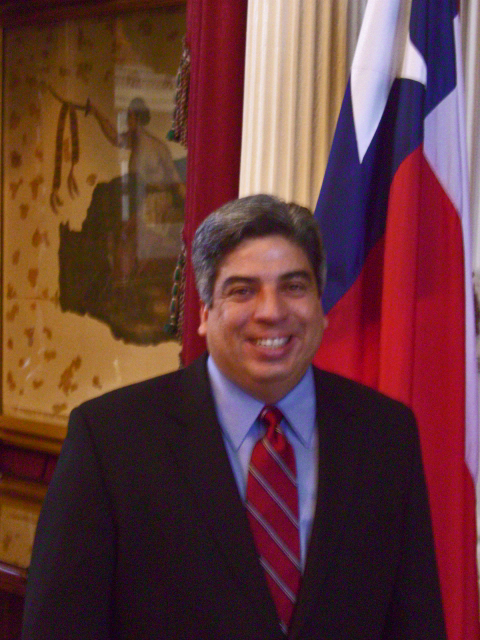
- Peña in 2006

Texas Thirteenth District Court of Appeals Place 3
- Incumbent
- Assumed office January 1, 2023
- Preceded by: Leticia Hinojosa

Member of the Texas House of Representatives from the 40th district
- In office January 14, 2003 – January 8, 2013
- Preceded by: Chuy Hinojosa
- Succeeded by: Terry Canales

Personal details
- Born: Lionel Aron Peña, Jr. June 8, 1959 (age 67) Austin, Texas, U.S.
- Party: Republican (2010–present)
- Other political affiliations: Democrat (before 2010)
- Spouse: Monica Solis Peña (m. 1991; div. 2015)
- Children: 5
- Education: University of Texas at Austin (B.A.); Thurgood Marshall School of Law (J.D)
- Profession: Attorney
- Website: Office website

Lionel Aron Peña, Jr., known as Aaron (born June 8, 1959) is an American attorney and politician serving as a justice of the Texas Court of Appeals since 2023. A member of the Republican Party, he previously represented the 40th district in the Texas House of Representatives from 2003 to 2013.

== Early life and education ==
Lionel Aron Peña, Jr., was born in Austin, Texas, to Lionel Aron Peña, Sr. and Sylvia Alamia Peña. The Peña and Alamia families originated in the Rio Grande Valley in Deep South Texas. His parents had moved to Austin so that his father could attend the University of Texas Law School. To support the family, Peña's parents worked at the Texas Capitol Complex—his mother for State Comptroller Zollie Steakley and father as a Texas House Committee Clerk. Peña spent the first few years of his life in a home on the banks of Waller Creek, two blocks from the State Capitol, now the location of the Dell Medical School.

After two years in Austin, the family returned to South Texas and settled in the city of Edinburg. "Little A" is the nickname given to Aaron as a young child.

Peña graduated from Edinburg High School in 1977. Thereafter, Peña attended Pan American University, now the University of Texas Rio Grande Valley. He thereafter moved to Austin where he received a Bachelor of Arts in political science from the University of Texas in May 1984. During his undergraduate studies, Peña worked as a legislative assistant at the State Capitol. Like his father before him, Peña studied to be a lawyer, receiving his Juris Doctor in May 1987 from Texas Southern University School of Law in Houston. Peña immediately returned to Edinburg to raise his family and to practice law.

== Early legal career ==
In May 1988, Peña was licensed to practice law by the State Bar of Texas. In his first years of practice, Peña took on an employment case as his first jury trial which was perceived to be unwinnable. The case resulted in a sizable verdict and marked the beginning of a successful career in the field of labor and employment law. In December 1995, Peña became board certified by the State Bar of Texas in the area of Labor and Employment Law. Peña served on the State Bar of Texas' governing board for Labor and Employment attorneys. After seventeen years of working almost exclusively as a plaintiff's lawyer, Peña began working exclusively as a civil defense lawyer. He twice earned the distinction and title "Super Lawyer" by Texas Monthly.

== State legislature ==
Representative Peña was first elected in 2002 and served five terms in the Texas Legislature representing District 40.

Early in his legislative career, Peña was selected to serve on the Appropriations Committee. Later, in his third term, Peña served as the Chairman of House Committee of Criminal Jurisprudence. In his fourth term, the Representative served as the Vice-Chairman of the Elections Committee and as Chairman of the House Select Committee on Emergency Preparedness. His fifth and final term saw him chair the House Committee on Technology.

At his arrival to the Texas Legislature, Peña was one of the early national pioneers in the use of social media. His digital communications to his constituents, novel at the time, were featured in national magazines and newspapers. In 2006, Capitol Inside named the Representative's website one of the Top 5 in the state. The National Conference of State Legislatures and the Council of State Governments invited Peña to present seminars at annual meetings to highlight his innovative approach to communicating with constituents.

In his first session, the Representative was a member of the so-called "Killer D's", a group of Texas House Democrats who left the state of Texas for Ardmore, Oklahoma during the week of May 12, 2003 and prevented a quorum in the House. The Killer D's left to prevent House consideration of redistricting legislation.

On December 14, 2010, Peña stated that Texas Democrats have strayed too far from his conservative views thus causing him to run in the next election as a Republican in Hidalgo County which has never before elected a Republican to office. Peña and State Representative Allan Ritter of Nederland in Texas's 21st district have switched political parties giving the Republican Party a 101–49 supermajority in the Texas House of Representatives.

On January 24, 2011, the Hispanic Republican Conference of Texas was formed. Representative Peña was elected the founding chairman of the organization; and on February 2, 2011 was formally sworn in by Texas Attorney General Greg Abbott. The Hispanic Republican Conference of Texas was formed to represent the interests of districts with a significant percentage of Hispanic populations represented by Republican legislators.

On November 25, 2011, Rep. Aaron Peña announced that he would not seek re-election to a sixth term in office. He issued a letter that was published in the McAllen Monitor that explained that his decision was made after a court-drawn redistricting map moved him into a neighboring Democratic district. His 10-year tenure with the Texas House of Representatives ends on January 8, 2013.

On January 27, 2012, a poll conducted by a local radio station asked the question, "Would you like to see Edinburg Representative Aaron Peña unretire and run for reelection?" The poll resulted in 65% of the respondents wanting Peña to seek reelection.

== Legislative achievements ==
A state operated drug treatment center in South Texas was one of the primary objectives Peña sought to achieve when he initially ran for public office. In 2007, the representative secured funding to bring such a facility to Edinburg. The center opened as the John Austin Peña Memorial Center in 2011.

Peña has served as a strong advocate for education. He filed numerous bills that aimed to raise teacher pay. The University of Texas-Pan American has seen continued growth in part because of the successful legislative projects championed by Representative Peña. These include a $40 Million dollar Fine Arts Center, a $25 Million dollar Student Wellness Center, $5 Million additional dollars for the Regional Academic Health Center at UT - Pan American, as well as continued growth in the university's operating budget.

During the 81st Legislative session, Peña sponsored legislation that gave birth to a much-needed medical school in the Rio Grande Valley.

An increase in state funding for local parks in South Texas has always been a priority. In 2007, the Representative secured significant increases in parks funding for his community. Of particular interest was the funding he secured for the development of a park at the new Edinburg Boys and Girls Club facility.

As a result of legislation (HB 109) championed by Representative Peña, the Children's Health Insurance Program increased access to healthcare for tens of thousands of children in Texas.

After repeated attempts, Peña passed legislation granting the Texas Legislative Medal of Honor to Edinburg hero Freddy Gonzalez in 2007. Similarly, during the 81st Legislative session, Peña passed HCR 5, which awarded the Texas Legislative Medal of Honor to another Edinburg war hero, Pedro Cano.

During the 82nd Legislative session, Peña negotiated the placement of a call center providing 400 jobs in his home town.

== Private sector and notable public service ==
On May 31, 2009, as Representative Peña was about to turn 50 years of age, he was commissioned a Major in the Texas State Guard. The Texas State Guard is one of three branches of the Texas military forces. Major General Chris Powers administered the oath for the commission directed by Governor Rick Perry and the Adjutant General. The Representative serves as a Staff Judge Advocate serving in the Command Headquarters in Austin. The swearing-in ceremony took place at the Capitol on the floor of the Texas House of Representatives. Speaker Joe Straus and Brigadier General, Raymond Peters joined family members on the rostrum during the ceremony.

Immediately after serving in the legislature, Peña assumed the role of Senior Vice President at Crosswind Media and Public Relations. Peña went on to serve as an Assistant General Counsel in the Texas Department of Agriculture under the leadership of Commissioner Todd Staples. Following the election of George P. Bush to Commissioner of the Texas General Land Office, Commissioner Bush asked him to act as the agency's Director of Litigation. He further serves as a government relations liaison for the agency with a particular focus on the Alamo and Veterans' issues. At present date he continues to work with the agency.

Peña was appointed to serve on the 29-member Alamo Citizens Advisory Committee organized to study and present advisory recommendations for the redevelopment of Alamo Plaza in San Antonio, Texas.

== Noteworthy speeches and appearances ==
- March 1, 2019: "The Alamo Master Plan" at the Texas State Historical Association Annual Meeting in Corpus Christi, TX.
- March 18, 2014 Peña was invited by President Barack Obama and the Department of Defense to attend the Medal of Honor Ceremony at the White House for Army Pvt. Pedro Cano. Accepting the medal on behalf of her late father was Dominga Perez. Attending the service were other members of the Cano family. Peña is credited for calling additional attention to the life and service of Army Pvt. Pedro Cano during his tenure as State Representative.
- In 2012 Peña attended the Republican National Convention as an alternate delegate. Peña was elected and served as a national delegate to the Democratic National Convention in 2004 (Boston) and 2008 (Denver). Peña also served on the national Democratic Party's platform committee that drafted the national platform adopted at the 2000 (Los Angeles) Democratic National Convention.
- April 30, 2012: Peña gave a speech honoring his community for receiving a record third Inspiration Award from the College Board
- August 19, 2006: Peña gave the Commencement Speech at the University of Texas–Pan American.
- Peña's final argument speeches from his work as a trial attorney are published in Million Dollar Arguments for sale to attorneys around the country.
- May 28, 2004: Peña appeared on NOW with Bill Moyers to discuss migrant farmworkers from South Texas.

== Committee assignments ==
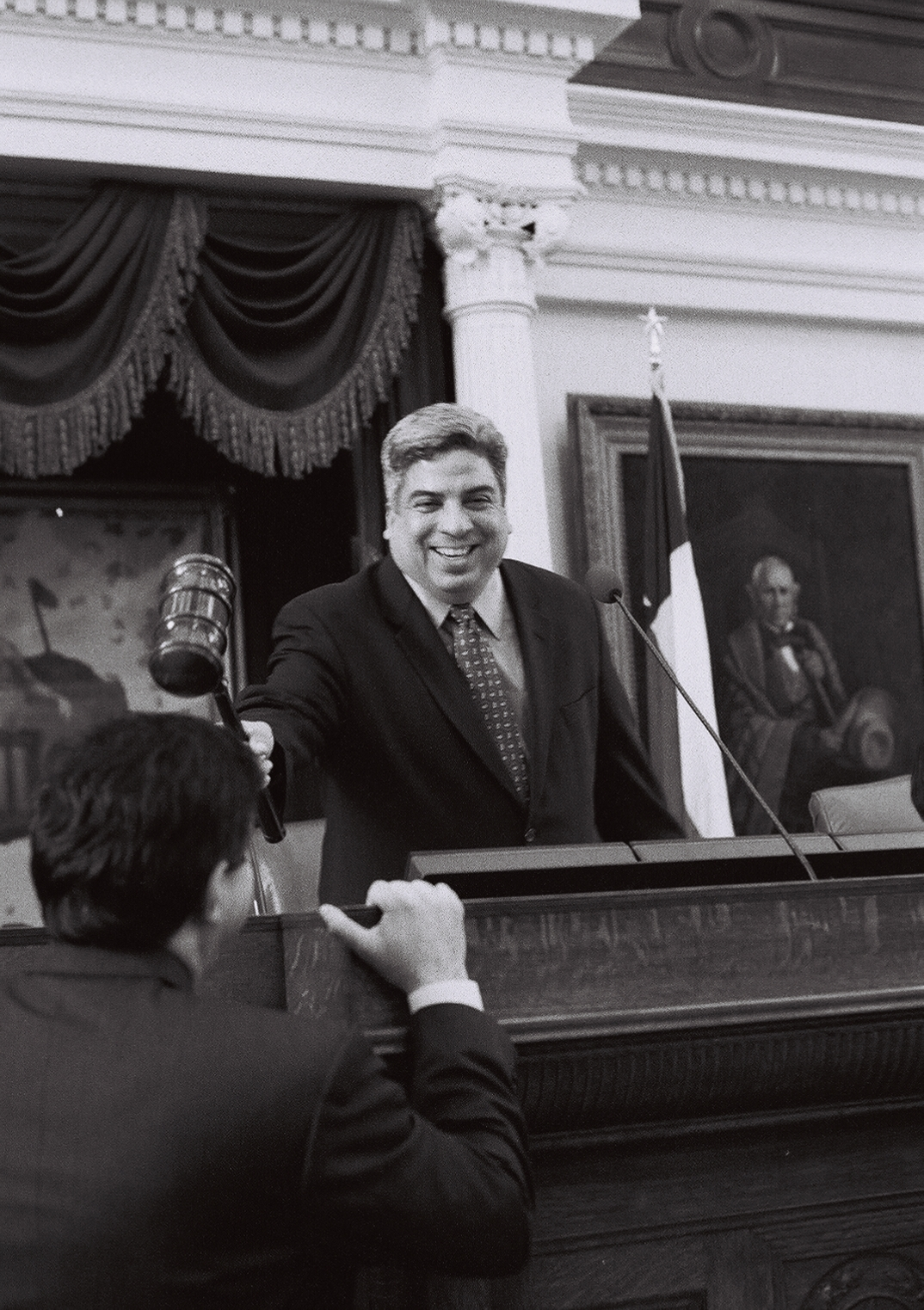

Representative Peña was selected as committee chairman during three sessions of the legislature: the House Committee for Criminal Jurisprudence, House Select Committee on Emergency Preparedness, and House Committee on Technology.

Below is a list of Peña's committee assignments in the 78th, 79th, 80th, 81st, and 82nd Texas Legislative Sessions.

78th Session

- Criminal Jurisprudence
- Pensions & Investments
- Sex Offenders Statutes (select committee)

79th Session

- Criminal Jurisprudence – Chairman of Budget & Oversight
- Appropriations
  - Subcommittee on Criminal Justice
  - Subcommittee on Government Efficiency & Operations
- Binational Alcohol and Substance Abuse Committee
- House Administration
- Interim Committee on Power of Eminent Domain

80th Session

- Chairman of Criminal Jurisprudence
- Ways & Means
- Joint Select Committee on the Texas Youth Commission

81st Session

- Vice Chairman of Elections
- Ways & Means
- Redistricting
- Chairman of Select House Committee on Emergency Preparedness

82nd Session

- Chairman of Technology
- Redistricting
- Voter Identification and Voter Fraud
- Homeland Security and Public Safety

== Awards and honors ==
- American Association of Political Consultants Pollie Award
- McAllen Chamber of Commerce Teddy Roosevelt Award
- Texas Federation of Republican Women Champion of Freedom Award
- TLR Civil Justice Leadership Award (2010, 2011)
- Texas Retailers Association Champion for Retailers Award
- South Texas Health Systems Community Leader Appreciation Award
- Boys and Girls Clubs, Edinburg 2009 Legislative Partner Award
- Texas State Firemen's and Fire Marshalls' Association Fire Service of Texas Appreciation Award
- Malayalee Association of the Rio Grande Valley Community Service Excellence Award for his outstanding contributions in social, economic and cultural development of the Rio Grande Valley.
- Texas District and County Attorneys Association (TDCAA) Law & Order Award in recognition of service to the Texas criminal justice system during the Regular 80th Session. As Chairman of the House Committee on Criminal Jurisprudence, he exhibited a respect for the victims of crime while maintaining a balanced approach for a fair and effective criminal justice system.
- Texas Association of Realtors Honor Roll for his work protecting private property rights in the 80th Legislative Session. Peña championed legislation reducing property taxes and worked to protect South Texas ranch lands and private property owners from the excesses of eminent domain.
- Capitol Inside Top Negotiator The non-partisan news site, Capitol Inside, identified Representative Peña as a top House negotiator of the 80th Legislative Session. Peña was named to more conference committees than any other member of the Texas House of Representatives. As a result, the Valley representative mediated many of the important pieces of legislation of that session, according to the news site.
- The Texas Humane Legislation Network The Texas Animal Humanitarian Award The non-profit organization that speaks on behalf of animal welfare agencies in Texas awarded Rep. Peña their highest award for his efforts to address the growing problems of animal cruelty, dog fighting, and the criminal activity surrounding these events.
- The Century Council's State Legislative Award The Century Council is an advocacy group promoting responsible alcohol use. Rep. Peña received the award for his "outstanding commitment to fight drunk-driving and underage drinking". Each December, the Representative makes considerable effort to participate in "National Drunk and Drugged Driving Prevention Month".

== Family history ==
- Representative Peña's great uncle, Juan Alamia, served as a Rough Rider with President Theodore Roosevelt in the Spanish–American War.
- Early Rio Grande Valley pioneers Jose Roman Alamia and Olivia Vela Alamia are the representative's great grandparents. Alamia served as Hidalgo County's first tax assessor and collector and participated in the development of Hidalgo County. On October 14, 1908, Alamia along with other elected officials on horseback forcibly moved the county seat from the City of Hidalgo, Texas by placing the county records on four wagons pulled by mule teams to an undeveloped parcel of land now known as Edinburg. Edinburg has since been the capitol of county government for Hidalgo County.
- Jose Roman Alamia, Jr. was elected Hidalgo County District Attorney in 1950 and later served as the District Judge of the 92nd District Court of Hidalgo County. In 1972, he served as the Administrative Judge of the 5th Judicial District, which covers most of South Texas.
- Lionel Aron Peña, Sr., the representative's father, served as an Edinburg City Commissioner and City Attorney in the early seventies.
- Adrienne Peña Garza, Peña's daughter, is the Chairwoman of the Hidalgo County Republican Party. She was sworn in June 2018, becoming the first woman to assume that role in the county's history.

== Election history ==
=== 2010 ===
Primary Election 2010: HD 40
Candidate	Votes	%	±
Aaron Peña			
no opponent			

=== 2008 ===
Primary Election 2008: HD 40
Candidate	Votes	%	±
Aaron Peña	9,839	52.90	19.23
Eddie Saenz	8,761	47.10	87.56

=== 2006 ===
General Election 2006: HD 40
Candidate	Votes	%	±
Aaron Peña	8,252	100	.89
no opponent	0	0	

=== 2004 ===
Primary 2004: HD 40
Candidate	Votes	%	±
Aaron Peña	8,179	63.64	14.32
Eddie Saenz	4,671	36.35	

=== 2002 ===
Primary 2002: HD 40
Candidate	Votes	%	±
Aaron Peña	7,154	56.11	
Eddy Gonzalez	5,595	43.88	

== Notes ==
Texas House of Representatives
Preceded by Juan "Chuy" Hinojosa	Member of the Texas House of Representatives from District 40 (Edinburg); 2003-2013	Succeeded by Terry Canales
