= Paul Colbert =

American politician

Member of the Texas House of Representatives from the 132nd district
- In office January 11, 1983 – January 12, 1993
- Preceded by: District created
- Succeeded by: Scott Hochberg

Member of the Texas House of Representatives from the 80th district
- In office January 13, 1981 – January 11, 1983
- Preceded by: Dan Downey
- Succeeded by: Charles Finnell

Personal details
- Party: Democratic

Paul Colbert is an American politician who served in the Texas House of Representatives from 1981 to 1993.
