= Wilhelmina Delco =

American politician (born 1929)

Wilhelmina Ruth Delco
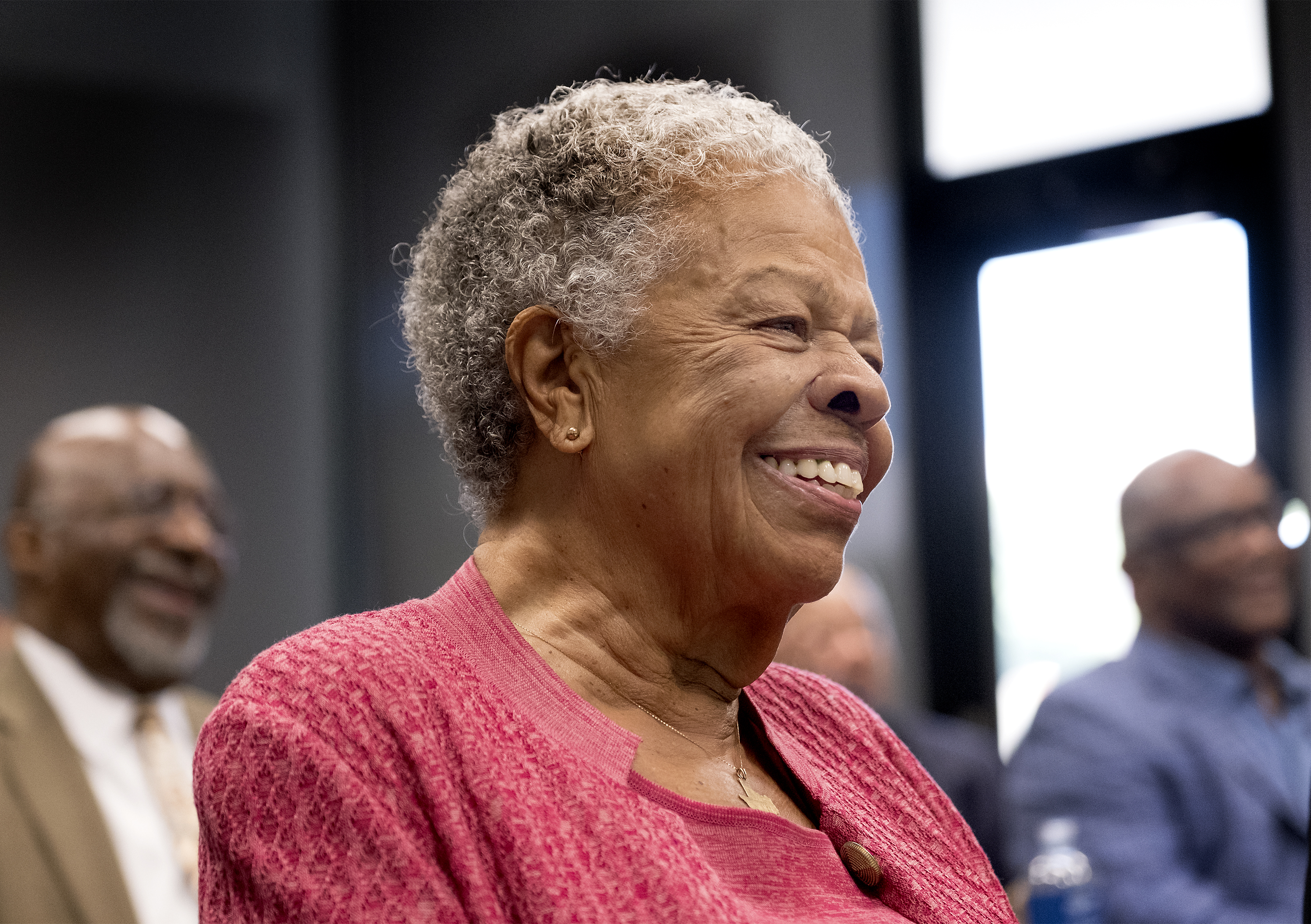

Speaker pro tempore of the Texas House of Representatives
- In office January 17, 1991 – 1993
- Preceded by: Michael D. McKinney
- Succeeded by: Donald R. "Tom" Uher

Member of the Texas House of Representatives from the 50th district
- In office January 11, 1983 – January 10, 1995
- Preceded by: René Oliveira
- Succeeded by: Dawnna Dukes

Member of the Texas House of Representatives from the 37-1, 37-D district
- In office January 14, 1975 – January 11, 1983
- Preceded by: Larry Bales
- Succeeded by: Irma Lerma Rangel (Redistricting)

Personal details
- Born: Wilhelmina Ruth Fitzgerald; July 16, 1929 (age 97) Chicago, Illinois, U.S.
- Party: Democratic
- Spouse: Exalton Alfonso Delco Jr. (m. 1952)
- Children: 4
- Education: Fisk University (BA)

Wilhelmina Ruth Delco (née Fitzgerald; born July 16, 1929) is an American politician who served in the Texas House of Representatives. She was inducted into the Texas Women's Hall of Fame in 1986. She was the first African American official elected at-large in Travis County and the first woman to hold the second-highest position in the Texas House of Representatives.

== Early life and education ==
On July 16, 1929, Delco was born as Wilhelmina Ruth Fitzgerald in Chicago, Illinois. Delco's parents were Juanita Fitzgerald Watson and William P. Fitzgerald. Her mother was one of the first probation officers in the United States, and her father was a court deputy and political organizer. Delco attended Wendell Phillips Academy High School, was student body president her senior year, and graduated as salutatorian.

In 1950, Delco earned a Bachelor of Arts degree in sociology from Fisk University in Nashville, Tennessee.

== Career ==
Delco was the head of the parent–teacher association at the school her child attended in Austin, Texas. After discovering that the school board had decided that the PTA would be charged every time they held a fundraiser, Delco decided to run for a position on the school board. In 1968, Delco was elected to the board of trustees for the Austin Independent School District two days after the assassination of Martin Luther King Jr., becoming the first African American elected to public office in Austin. In 1971, she led the effort to nominate Gus Garcia to fill a vacancy on the board. She was the secretary of the board from 1972 to 1974. She was one of the founding board of trustees of Austin Community College and served as secretary of the board from 1973 to 1974. She was also a member of the Austin League of Women Voters.

Prior to 1974, Travis County elected its state representatives county wide from a multi-member district. Federal courts ordered Travis County's four state representatives to be elected from single member districts starting in 1974. Delco was elected to the Texas House of Representatives from a new northeast Travis County single member district in 1974 and would go on to serve ten terms in the legislature. From 1979 to 1991, she was chair of the Higher Education Committee for the House. She became the first black legislator from Texas's 50th House of Representatives district. From 1991 to 1993, she was speaker pro tempore of the House of Representatives. She retired from the legislature in 1995.

She was chair of the board of trustees for Huston-Tillotson College and an adjunct professor at the University of Texas at Austin with the Community College Leadership Program. Delco was the chair of the National Advisory Committee on Institutional Quality and Integrity of the United States Department of Education. She was also involved in efforts to encourage divestiture from apartheid-era South Africa. Delco was a commissioner of the Texas Ethics Commission.

In 1993, she was awarded the James Bryant Conant Award by the Education Commission of the States for her contributions to American education.

The Wilhelmina F. Delco Building on the campus of Prairie View A&M University is named after her.

The Delco Activity Center in Austin, which opened in 2002, is named after her and her husband. It provides facilities for a variety of athletic competitions.

Wilhelmina Delco Elementary School in Austin and in Pflugerville ISD is named after her.

The City of Austin's Permitting and Development Center, which opened in July 2021, is located on Wilhelmina Delco Drive.

== Personal life ==
Delco's husband is Exalton Alfonso Delco Jr., whom she met in the cafeteria while attending Fisk University. Exalton Alfonso Delco Jr. became the first African American to receive a Doctor of Philosophy degree in zoology from the University of Texas at Austin in 1962. He had a long career as a professor at Huston–Tillotson University, Austin Community College, and Texas Southern University, and educated several noteworthy students including Barbara Jordan. He worked at Huston–Tillotson University for 25 years and eventually became dean. Delco and her husband are Catholic. She has four children, nine grandchildren, and two great-grandchildren.

Texas House of Representatives
Preceded by René Orlando Oliveira	Member of the Texas House of Representatives from District 50 (Austin); 1983–1995	Succeeded by Dawnna Dukes

Preceded by District established	Member of the Texas House of Representatives from District 37-D (Austin); 1977–1983	Succeeded by: District abolished; Irma Lerma Rangel (District 37)

Preceded by Larry Bales	Member of the Texas House of Representatives from District 37-1 (Austin); 1975–1977	Succeeded by District abolished
