= Juan Hinojosa =

American politician (born 1946)

Chuy Hinojosa
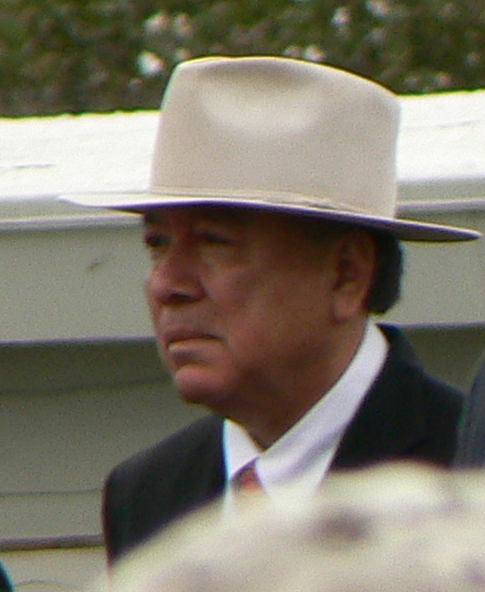
- Hinojosa in 2008

President pro tempore of the Texas Senate
- In office January 13, 2015 – June 1, 2015
- Preceded by: Craig Estes
- Succeeded by: Kevin Eltife

Member of the Texas Senate from the 20th district
- Incumbent
- Assumed office January 14, 2003
- Preceded by: Carlos Truan

Member of the Texas House of Representatives
- In office January 14, 1997 – January 14, 2003
- Preceded by: Eddie De La Garza
- Succeeded by: Aaron Peña
- Constituency: 40th district
- In office January 13, 1981 – January 8, 1991
- Preceded by: Cullen Looney
- Succeeded by: Roberto Gutierrez
- Constituency: 59-A district (1981–1983); 41st district (1983–1991)

Personal details
- Born: Juan Jesus Hinojosa; March 7, 1946 (age 80) McAllen, Texas, U.S.
- Party: Democratic
- Education: University of Texas, Pan American (BA); Georgetown University (JD)
- Website: Office website

Military service
- Allegiance: United States
- Branch: United States Marine Corps
- Service years: 1966–1968
- Conflict: Vietnam War

Juan Jesus "Chuy" Hinojosa (born March 7, 1946) is an American politician and attorney who is a member of the Texas Senate, representing the 20th district, which stretches from Corpus Christi to McAllen. A Democrat, he was first elected to the Senate in 2002 and has represented parts of South Texas in the Texas Legislature for a combined total of over 35 years.

== Biography ==
=== Education and legal career ===
Born in McAllen, Texas, Hinojosa was a farm worker who worked his way through school to earn a Juris Doctor degree. He served his country in the United States Marine Corps from 1966 to 1968, and was a squad leader in Vietnam War. Returning to South Texas, he earned a bachelor's degree in political science from Pan American University in Edinburg, graduating with honors.

After graduating from Georgetown University Law Center in Washington, D.C., Hinojosa worked for the Legal Aid Society of Nueces County in Corpus Christi, and as an Assistant Attorney General in McAllen and San Antonio.

=== Legislative career ===
First elected to the Texas House of Representatives in 1981, Hinojosa served a nonconsecutive total of eight terms before being elected to the Texas Senate in 2002. Hinojosa has earned a reputation for his criminal justice expertise. He authored the Texas Fair Defense Act and other reforms to establish court-appointed counsel for indigent defendants, prohibit capital punishment for defendants with mental illness, and streamline the court system to provide swifter justice. He also sponsored SB 3, which established procedures for DNA testing, use and preservation. In 2005, Senator Hinojosa authored SB 1125 to eliminate the state's few remaining rogue drug task force operations and put them under the jurisdiction of the Department of Public Safety. In the wake of the Tulia drug arrests scandal, Hinojosa worked to improve transparency and oversight by requiring that drug task force operations submit to state oversight, with failure to do so to result in an inability to receive state-administered federal grant money.

During the 2007 legislative session, Hinojosa authored and passed SB 103; to completely reform the state's troubled Texas Youth Commission after sexual and physical abuse of youth were documented by the Texas Rangers. SB 103 made a number of fundamental changes, including ending the practice of housing children with older teenagers, and creating a Parent's Bill of Rights to guarantee swift and accurate access to information about caseworkers' duties and the agency's grievance policies. Senator Hinojosa was appointed to the TYC Legislative Oversight Committee to continue working on the reform of the troubled agency.

Hinojosa has twice been named one of Texas' "top 10 legislators" by Texas Monthly magazine, and in 2007 he again received accolades from the magazine for his work reforming the Texas Youth Commission. The National Organization for Women (NOW) named Hinojosa "Legislator of the Year," and he received the prestigious John Henry Faulk Award, presented by the American Civil Liberties Union. In 2006, he was the recipient of the Public Servant of the Year Award from the Coalition of Texans with Disabilities, and in 2007, he received the Patient Advocacy Award from the Texas Academy of Family Physicians. He also received the Humane Legislator award from the Humane Society of the United States, a special recognition award from the NAACP for his work on TYC and criminal justice reform and the "Texas Medicines Best Legislator" award from the Texas Medical Association for his work to restore Children's Health Insurance Program funding and improve childhood immunization rates.

Hinojosa is Vice Chairman of the Senate Finance Committee. He is not related to Texas U.S. Representative Rubén Hinojosa, who represented the same general area in Congress as Senator Hinojosa does in the state senate.

== Controversies ==
=== Airport security incident ===
In 2005, Hinojosa carried a gun past an airport security checkpoint at McAllen Miller International Airport. He was detained as police verified his concealed handgun permit and identity and traced the weapon before releasing him. Before Hinojosa was even arraigned, the criminal charges were dropped by local judge Kathleen Henley, prompting allegations of special treatment and corruption, including from Texas gun-owners, and from the McAllen police chief Victor Rodriguez who said: "I think dismayed is probably...too kind...for [how we feel about Judge Henley dismissing the charges] but it's in that area. Because we operated under the idea yesterday that an arraignment would take place" [but then] "we learned that Judge Henley basically dismissed him. ... I've never seen a case basically tossed out at the arraignment point," and "The laws are very specific and very clear. It's a chargeable offense even if it's done recklessly [i.e. accidentally, as was the excuse Senator Hinojosa gave]". Judge Henley has refused to comment on why she dismissed the charges against Hinojosa.

Hinojosa claims that he "was handled just like any other citizen"; however, in comparison, many people have been penalized for "accidentally" carrying a gun through security check-points in American airports.

Hinojosa also made a public statement soon after the incident, admitting he had made a mistake by "rushing to the airport and not checking my briefcase prior to entering the McAllen Miller International Airport." He said airport security did its job. Soon after the incident, Hinojosa sent a letter of apology to the chief of the McAllen Police Department. He also commended the department for performing its duty with utmost professionalism.

=== Traffic stop by South Texas Drug Task Force ===
In 2005, Hinojosa was pulled over by an agent from a South Texas Drug Task Force on Hwy 281 while traveling south. The agent stated that the reason for the stop was that Hinojosa swerved his vehicle from lane to lane, and that the tint on Hinojosa's car was too dark. Hinojosa accused officers of racial profiling; the entire incident was videotaped and Hinojosa never proved the racial profiling accusation to the internal affairs division that supervises the officers who stopped him. Hinojosa told the agent during the stop that he had no reason to pull him over and that the tint on his windows was factory-issued. Hinojosa was allowed to continue his travel after being cited for the window tinting. Hinojosa later told Guillermo X. Garcia, a reporter for the San Antonio Express-News, that the task force agent followed him for 3 miles before pulling him over.

In 2005 legislative discussions, Hinojosa was quoted as saying, "These drug task forces are out there just interdicting and stopping people illegally without probable cause asking to search their vehicles and pretty much harassing citizens of the State of Texas. And all they are trying to do is see if they can find money that they can seize to fund their operations. To me what they do is illegal, improper, and not good public policy." Hinojosa also said of Texas' Drug Task Forces, "They don't need probable cause to stop you. They just stop you. They will profile you, which is illegal, ask to search your vehicle without probable cause, which is also illegal, and I refuse. But a lot of citizens don't know that and what they do is go through your car, snoop around, see what they can find and let you go if they don't find any money. Those drug task forces have no business operating in our state."

== Electoral history ==
=== 2004 ===
Texas general election, 2004: Senate District 20
Party	Candidate	Votes	%	±%
Democratic	Juan "Chuy" Hinojosa (Incumbent)	116,723	100.00	0.00
Majority		116,723	100.00	0.00
Turnout		116,723		+48.34
Democratic hold				

=== 2002 ===
2002 Texas general election: Senate District 20
Party	Candidate	Votes	%	±%
Democratic	Juan "Chuy" Hinojosa	78,685	100.00	+41.91
Majority		78,685	100.00	+83.82
Turnout		78,685		−20.23
Democratic hold				

Democratic primary runoff, 2002: Senate District 20
Candidate		Votes	%	±
	Barbara Canales-Black	27,068	44.53	+5.47
✓	Juan "Chuy" Hinojosa	33,716	55.47	+12.45
Majority		6,648	10.94	
Turnout		60,784		

Democratic primary, 2002: Senate District 20
Candidate		Votes	%	±
✓	Barbara Canales-Black	25,922	39.07	
	Ruben M. Garcia	4,266	6.43	
✓	Juan "Chuy" Hinojosa	28,543	43.02	
	Diana Martinez	7,624	11.49	
Turnout		66,355		

=== 1992 ===
Democratic primary, 1992: Senate District 27
Candidate		Votes	%	±
	Juan "Chuy" Hinojosa	25,132	42.67	
✓	Eddie Lucio, Jr. (Incumbent)	33,765	57.33	
Majority		8,633	14.66	
Turnout		58,897		

Texas Senate
Preceded by Craig Estes	President pro tempore of the Texas Senate; 2015	Succeeded by Kevin Eltife
