= Texas's 40th House of Representatives district =

American legislative district

Texas's 40th State House of Representatives district
Representative
| Terry Canales; D–Edinburg |

District 40 is a district in the Texas House of Representatives. It has been represented by Democrat Terry Canales since 2013.

== Geography ==
The district is located in Hidalgo County, Texas.

== Members ==
- Juan Hinojosa (1997–2003)
- Aaron Peña (2003–2013)
- Terry Canales (since 2013)
