= Texas's 137th House of Representatives district =

American legislative district

Texas's 137th State House of Representatives district
Representative
Gene Wu; D–Houston
- Demographics: 14.6% White; 20.5% Black; 53.0% Hispanic; 12.4% Asian
- Population (2020) • Voting age: 196,097; 147,453

District 137 of the Texas House of Representatives, is located in southwestern Houston, Texas. The district has been represented by Gene Wu since 2013.

Per 2020 census data, the 137th district is one of the most diverse State House Districts in the legislature.

== List of representatives ==
Leg.	Representative	Party	Term start	Term end	Counties they represented
68th	Debra Danburg	Democratic	January 11, 1983	January 8, 1985	Harris
69th	Debra Danburg	Democratic	January 8, 1985	January 13, 1987	Harris
70th	Debra Danburg	Democratic	January 13, 1987	January 10, 1989	Harris
71st	Debra Danburg	Democratic	January 10, 1989	January 8, 1991	Harris
72nd	Debra Danburg	Democratic	January 8, 1991	January 12, 1993	Harris
73rd	Debra Danburg	Democratic	January 12, 1993	January 10, 1995	Harris
74th	Debra Danburg	Democratic	January 10, 1995	January 14, 1997	Harris
75th	Debra Danburg	Democratic	January 14, 1997	January 12, 1999	Harris
76th	Debra Danburg	Democratic	January 12, 1999	January 9, 2001	Harris
77th	Debra Danburg	Democratic	January 9, 2001	January 14, 2003	Harris
78th	Scott Hochberg	Democratic	January 14, 2003	January 11, 2005	Harris
79th	Scott Hochberg	Democratic	January 11, 2005	January 11, 2007	Harris
80th	Scott Hochberg	Democratic	January 11, 2007	January 13, 2009	Harris
81st	Scott Hochberg	Democratic	January 13, 2009	January 11, 2011	Harris
82nd	Scott Hochberg	Democratic	January 11, 2011	January 8, 2013	Harris
83rd	Gene Wu	Democratic	January 8, 2013	January 13, 2015	Harris
84th	Gene Wu	Democratic	January 13, 2015	January 10, 2017	Harris
85th	Gene Wu	Democratic	January 10, 2017	January 8, 2019	Harris
86th	Gene Wu	Democratic	January 8, 2019	January 12, 2021	Harris
87th	Gene Wu	Democratic	January 12, 2021	Present	Harris
88th	TBD	TBD	2023	2025	Harris
