= Robert Guerra (politician) =

Texas politician (born 1953)

Robert "Bobby" Guerra

Member of the Texas House of Representatives from the 41st district
- Incumbent
- Assumed office September 25, 2012
- Preceded by: Veronica Gonzales
- Succeeded by: Julio Salinas (elect)

Personal details
- Born: Roberto Deodoro Guerra; August 12, 1953 (age 73) Edinburg, Texas, U.S.
- Party: Democratic
- Spouse: Leslie-Yoder Guerra
- Children: 3
- Education: University of Texas–Pan American(BA); Thurgood Marshall School of Law(JD)
- Occupation: Television reporter; attorney
- Website: Campaign website

Roberto Deodoro Guerra (born August 12, 1953) is an American attorney and a Democratic member of the Texas House of Representatives. He has represented District 41 since September 25, 2012.

== Texas House of Representatives ==
Guerra sits on the House Committees on Energy Resources; Environmental Regulation; and Resolutions Calendars.

== Education ==
He graduated from Pan American University in 1977 with a bachelor's degree and a double major in biology and chemistry. In 1985, he graduated with cum laude honors from the Thurgood Marshall School of Law.
