= South Texas Archives and Special Collections =

South Texas Archives
- Established: 1981
- Location: Kingsville, Texas, USA
- Website: archives.tamuk.edu

The South Texas Archives and Special Collections, a division of the James C. Jernigan Library of Texas A&M University–Kingsville, was established to preserve and to make available to the public documentary materials about the history and natural history of South Texas. It also includes rare books and the university archives. The Archives are located on the third floor of James C. Jernigan Library, 1050 University Blvd, Kingsville, TX 78363.

== History ==
Although the South Texas Archives was not officially created until 1981, the systematic accumulation of historical documents was started by Professor John E. Conner when he joined the Department of History shortly after the creation of the South Texas State Teachers College. In 1925, the year that STSTC opened its doors to students, John E. Conner, chairman of the Department of History and Dean of the School, began receiving "family treasures" from area residents who were interested in preserving their past and treasures for future historians. As a historian with a keen interest in the history of Texas, he gladly received these items and stored them where he could, starting a museum.

By the late 1940s, the collection had grown to such an extent that Dr. Conner was given additional space. An area known as "The Forum"—an open-air, 2,000 square feet (190 m^{2}) gathering arena where students had heard many speeches and held their graduations—was walled in and the space became the first John E. Conner Museum. There was no heating, no air conditioning, no plumbing, and a leaking roof. But there was space for the growing collection and there was an interest in preserving the past.

In 1964, when Conner retired from Texas College of Arts & Industries (as it was renamed in 1929), the Department of History assumed responsibility for the growing collection of historical artifacts and documents. Various historians managed the museum until Ms. Jimmie Picquet was named director and administrator in 1972. Under her direction, the museum was relocated into a remodeled building on the main street of the campus. In 1981 she asked the university to officially create the South Texas Archives, a division of the John Conner Museum. The mission of the new Archives is to preserve the documentary history, of rural, agricultural south Texas and northern Mexico and make it available for research.

It was designated a Regional Historical Records Depository by the State Library and Archives and the official Archives for the Texas A&I University. It became the archival home of the South Texas Historical Association which publishes the Journal of South Texas. In 1995 the South Texas Archives was made a division of the James C. Jernigan Library at Texas A&M University-Kingsville (renamed in 1993), given academic status and expanded its mission so that it became the South Texas Archives a Special Collections and included the rare book collection of the library. In 2009, the South Texas Archives relocated from Lila Baugh Hall (since demolished) to the James C. Jernigan Library.

== Current Holdings ==
Today the South Texas Archives and Special Collections is actively involved in the collection and preservation of documents that provide information about the history, folklore, politics, culture, and natural history of South Texas. It includes 1. Personal and family papers, in English and Spanish, consisting of correspondence, diaries, legal and financial documents; 2. Organizational records consisting of correspondence, reports, minutes, financial and legal papers, photographs, printed materials and other documentation produced by a group or corporate activity; 3. Visual images which may take the form of photographs, negatives, postcards, prints, drawings, sketches, videotapes and others; 4. Sound recordings and oral histories, in English and Spanish; 5. Printed materials in the forms of newspapers, periodicals, pamphlets, brochures, and others and materials that relate to South Texas. 6. The official records of this university, including correspondence, written records and photographs that tell the history of the school known as South Texas State Normal School, South Texas State Teachers College, Texas College of Arts and Industries, Texas A&I University and Texas A&M University-Kingsville; 8. A book collection that includes specialized books primarily in the area of the history and natural history of South Texas and Texas during the Civil War. There are large collections of books about railroad history and of ranching history in South Texas. 9. As a depository for the local government records collected by the Texas State Library and Archives System the Archives house some official records of cities, counties, school districts, and other local agencies, and district and appeals courts records from the eleven surrounding counties. In addition probate, marriage, deed records, surveyors’ records, and tax rolls are included in the microfilm holdings that are available through an inter depository or interlibrary loan. Records are from Aransas, Bee, Brooks, Duval, Jim Wells, Kenedy, Kleberg, Live Oak, Nueces, Refugio, and San Patricio County.

The South Texas Archives also houses the extensive collections of State Senator Carlos. F. Truan; State Representative Irma Rangel, and early South Texas political boss and County Judge, J.T. Canales.
