= Juan Manuel Escobar =

American politician (1950–2026)

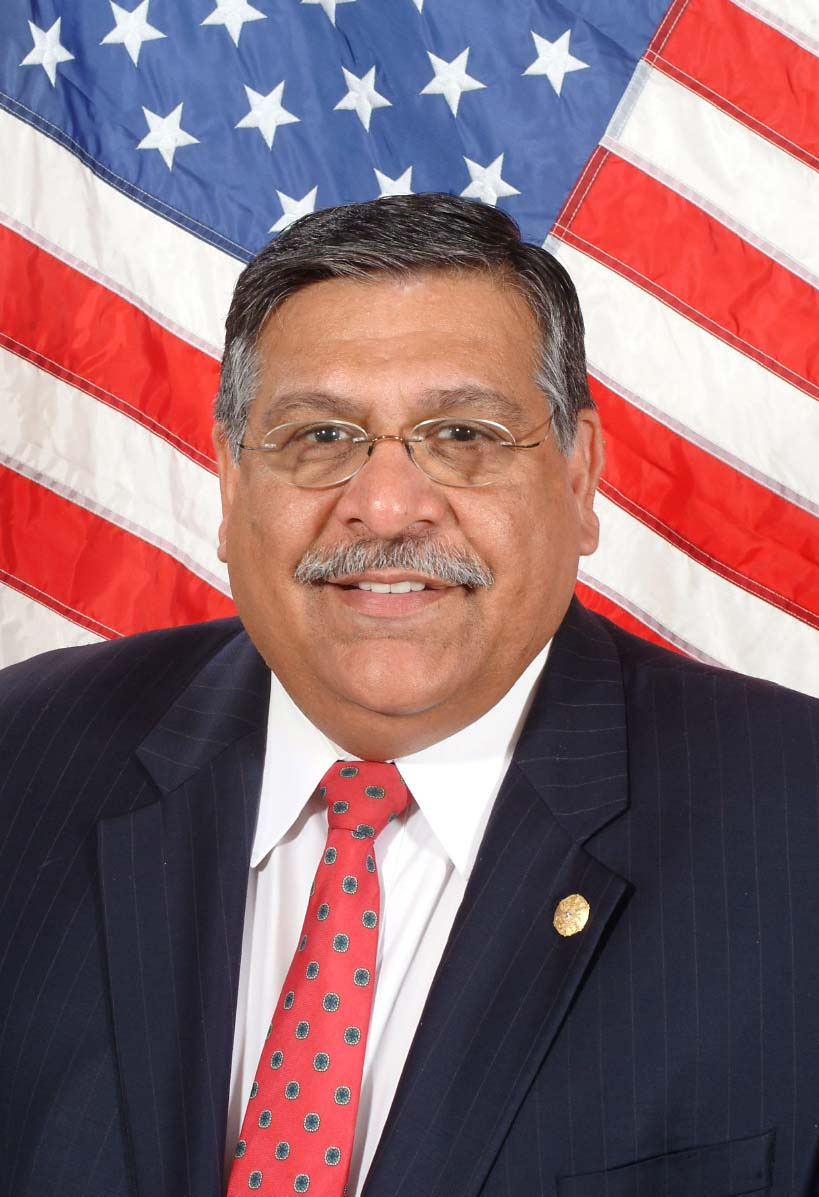

Member of the Texas House of Representatives from the 43rd district
- In office May 9, 2003 – January 13, 2009
- Preceded by: Irma Lerma Rangel
- Succeeded by: Tara Rios Ybarra

Personal details
- Born: March 11, 1950 Escobares, Texas, U.S.
- Died: August 12, 2026 (aged 76) Kingsville, Texas, U.S.
- Party: Democratic
- Education: University of Texas–Pan American (BS)

Military service
- Allegiance: United States
- Branch/service: United States Marine Corps: United States Marine Corps Reserve
- Rank: Staff Sergeant
- Unit: 1st Marine Division
- Battles/wars: Vietnam War

Juan Manuel Escobar (March 11, 1950 – August 12, 2026) was an American politician and judge. He was a member of the Texas House of Representatives from the 43rd district from 2003 to 2009, and was a Kleberg County judge from 2011 to 2014.

== Early life and education ==
Juan Manuel Escobar was born in Escobares, Texas, on March 11, 1950. Early in his life, Escobar was a migrant worker. Escobar attended Roma High School, where he was a Texas All-State Class AA first team selection in basketball, competed in the 440 at the Texas Class AA State final, and served as Student Council President during his senior year. Escobar earned a Bachelor of Science in biology from the University of Texas–Pan American in 1978.

== Military service ==
Escobar served in the United States Marine Corps with the 1st Marine Division in Vietnam where he was wounded in action in 1970. He rose to the rank of Sergeant and was assigned to United States Marine Barracks 8th & I in Washington, D.C., where he was a pallbearer for presidents Lyndon B. Johnson and Harry S. Truman. He ended his duties as an active duty Marine and was promoted to the rank of Staff Sergeant in the United States Marine Corps Reserve where he served as a Platoon Sergeant with a Reco Unit.

He began his career with United States Border Patrol in 1978 and was the "Patrol Agent in Charge" at the Sarita checkpoint for several years. He was promoted to Senior Special Agent with the Organized Crime Drug Enforcement Task Force. He retired from the United States Department of Homeland Security in 2003.

== Political career ==
Escobar was elected to the Texas House of Representatives in a special election to replace the late Irma Lerma Rangel in May 2003. He served in that capacity until January 2009. He served as Vice Chair of the Defense Affairs—State Federal Relations, Criminal Jurisprudence, House Administration, Border and Intergovernmental Affairs and Land and Resource Management.

In 2008 he was defeated by fellow Democrat Tara Rios Ybarra 53.74% to his 46.25% in a higher than average turnout election.

In 2010 he was elected as Kleberg County Judge, and served until December 2014.

== Personal life and death ==
Escobar lived in Kingsville, Texas, with his wife, Maria del Rosario (Rosie). He was a lay minister and an administrator for St. Joseph's Catholic Church in Kingsville. Escobar served as a Major in the Civil Air Patrol.

His children were Yvonne Yvette and Eduardo Eden. He also had two grandsons.

Escobar died in Kingsville on August 12, 2026, at the age of 76.

Preceded by Irma Lerma Rangel	Member of the Texas House of Representatives from District 43 (Kingsville); 2003–2009	Succeeded by Tara Rios Ybarra
