= Juan Alamia =

- Born: c. 1876; Port Isabel, Texas
- Died: May 11, 1913 (aged 36/37); Rio Bravo, Mexico
- Cause of death: Execution by hanging
- Other name: John B. Alamia
- Occupation: Rough Riders soldier

Juan Alamia (c. 1876 – May 11, 1913) was an American soldier who served as a Rough Rider in the Spanish–American War.

== Early life ==
Alamia was born (abt. 1876) to Benito Alamia and Francisca Ybarra in Point Isabel, Texas (now known as Port Isabel). His siblings were Jose Roman Alamia (1877–1924), Maria de la Paz Alamia (1853–1929), Gregoria Alamia, Vivian Alamia, Lorenzo Alamia, Antonio Alamia, Bernardo Alamia, Julio Alamia, and Josefina Alamia.

== Rough Rider ==
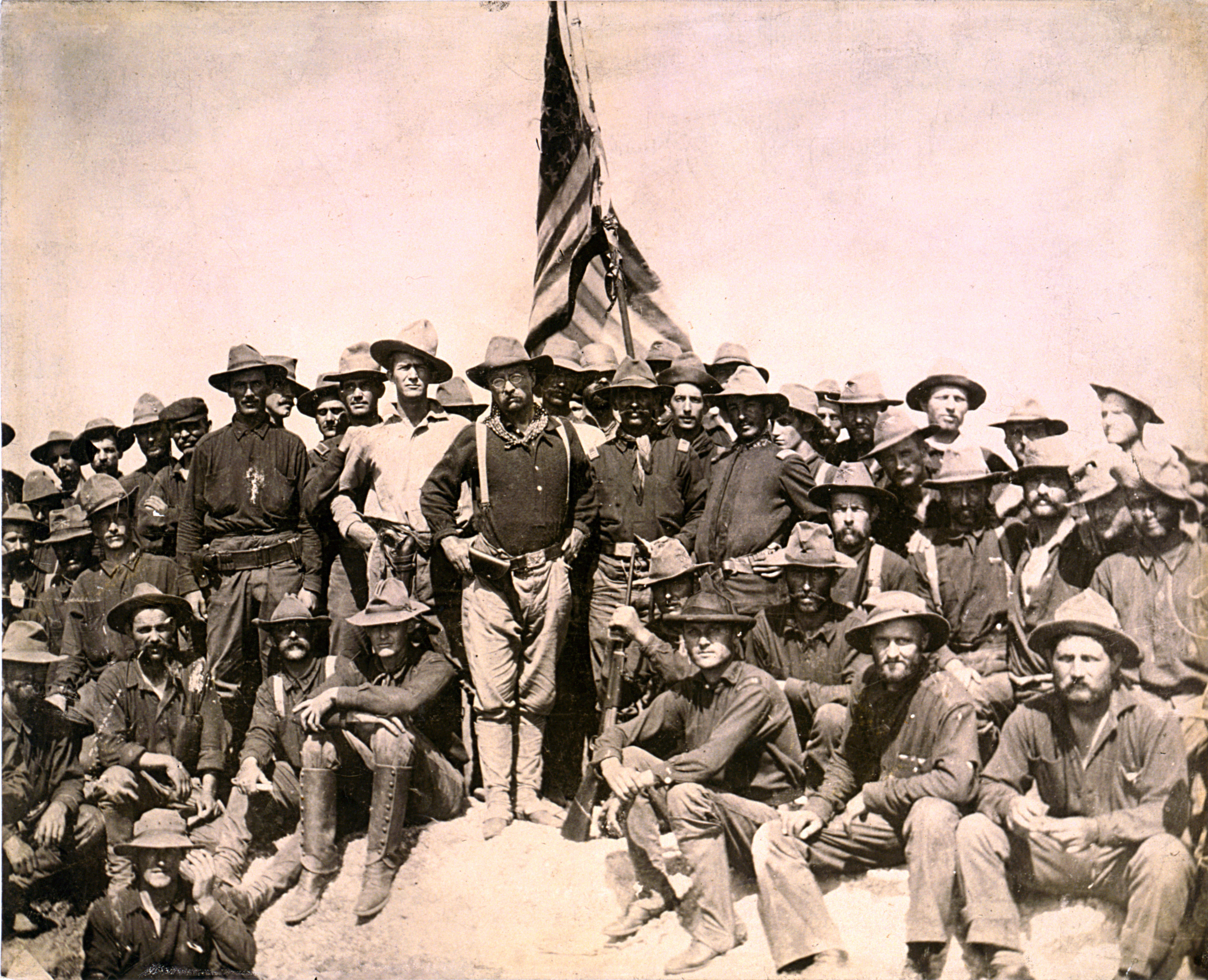
Roosevelt and the Rough Riders atop San Juan Heights, 1898

On May 27, 1898, Juan Alamia mustered in under the name John B. Alamia in San Antonio, Texas to serve in First United States Volunteer Cavalry, also known as the Rough Riders. Alamia was a member of B Troop commanded by Captain James H. McClintock.

The conflict between Spain and the United States centered on the question of Cuba, where for several years insurgents had been fighting a guerrilla war against their colonial rulers; on April 20, 1898, the U.S. Congress recognized Cuban independence and simultaneously authorized the use of American military force to ensure it; four days later, Spain declared war on the United States.

Alamia's regiment trained at Camp Wood in San Antonio for a month before embarking for Cuba; the unit's first commander, Leonard Wood, was soon replaced by his second-in-command, Theodore Roosevelt; known affectionately as the Rough Riders, these troops won fame for their successful assaults on Kettle and San Juan hills, near the city of Santiago, on July 1, 1898.

== Battles of Reynosa and Matamoros, Tamaulipas ==
While living in Brownsville, Texas Juan Alamia worked as a telegrapher for Western Union along with his younger brother, Jose Roman. His work took him across the river to Matamoros, Mexico. Supporters of Lucio Blanco, one of Carranza's generals, ordered Alamia to send a wire message to Mexico City telling opposing forces that all was serene in Matamoros and to come on into the city. In fact, Blanco and his supporters were laying a trap. Alamia failed to follow the directions he was given and sent a communication to Mexico City of the true circumstances on the border.

== Personal life ==
Alamia married Maria Kohlman (1874–1945), a New Mexico territory native, in 1901. They had three children: Mary F. Alamia (1901–1912), Peter Ciro Alamia (1902–1948), and Joseph Albert Alamia (1908–1957). Juan Alamia had another child named Antonia Alamia (1899-1980).

== Death ==
On May 9, 1913, Lucio Blanco captured the town of Reynosa, Mexico. Blanco's attack killed twenty-one of the defenders and drove many across the river into Texas. Between Reynosa and Matamoros is a place called Río Bravo.

On May 10, 1913, Lucio Blanco appeared at Río Bravo, Mexico. This is located 40 miles west from the cities of Brownsville and Matamoros.

Alamia and eleven others were confronted by Lucio Blanco and his men. The twelve were asked and declined to join the army being led by Blanco. The twelve were taken prisoner and executed.

To display his disdain for Americans, he strung Alamia and two others from a mesquite tree.

His death occurred on May 11, 1913, in Rio Bravo, Mexico.

Captain Everette Anglin gave testimony before a committee of the Foreign Relations Committee of the United States Senate (66th Congress) investigating the outrages of citizens of the United States in Mexico. From his first hand testimony we learn of some of the circumstances surrounding Alamia's death.

Anglin, unaware of Blanco's capabilities, arrived at Blanco's camp at Rio Bravo attempting to reclaim horses belonging to Texans from the Rancho Salteña. Blanco refused to return them because he needed them. After Anglin protested that they belonged to Americans Blanco showed his disdain for Americans pointing to Alamia whose body and the other two men were still hanging from a tree near the river bank. Anglin was horrified at the site of Alamia in that the two were friends. Anglin returned to the United States where he reported the incident to Juan Alamia's brother Jose Roman Alamia who was then serving as Hidalgo County's tax collector.

The ranch where he was executed is known as Las Alacranes, which translates to "the scorpions". The ranch has been held by the Garza family for many generations as it is today. A lady in the Garza family cut Juan Alamia down from the tree where he was hanging. Others feared cutting him down for fear of retribution from General Blanco. She hitched her wagon and went to the place where Alamia and another man were hanging. She put his body in the wagon and took it to a place across the river from Bill Brewster's Ranch were a person in a skiff took the body across the river.

He was then buried in the family plot in the old Brownsville cemetery.

His life went unrecognized for years except for a corrido still sung in Rio Bravo and amongst the Garza family at "Las Alacranes" ranch in Rio Bravo, Mexico. Upon the marriage of a descendant of Juan Alamia and the brave lady who retrieved his body from the mesquite tree, the story in the corrido was shared. Adrienne Peña-Garza told her father, a member of the state legislature, of the story shared with her by her husband Aquiles Jaime Garza. Her father found the crumbling tomb of Juan Alamia in the old Brownsville cemetery and searched through old family records to piece together his story so that it could be told. On August 5, 2003, the Texas Legislature honored the life and service of this brave and nearly forgotten American with a resolution telling his story.
