= Project GRAD Houston =

Non-profit organisation in the USA

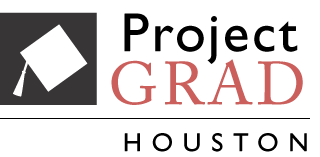

Project GRAD Houston (Graduation Really Achieves Dreams), is a non-profit based in Houston, United States, providing free college access, college success, and career advising services. Project GRAD's mission is to improve lives in low-income communities by helping individuals develop and achieve their educational aspirations.

Founded in 1994 by James and Kathryn Ketelsen, Project GRAD originally worked in five Houston ISD high schools: Northside High School (Houston), Wheatley High School (Houston), Sam Houston Math, Science, and Technology Center, Heights High School, and Yates High School offering scholarships through their GRAD Scholar Program to students who met certain requirements as a way to increase graduation rates. From there, GRAD began working in the high school feeder patterns offering educators, math and reading curriculum, and strict disciplinary practices to 70 HISD schools.

Nearly 20 years after its founding and after becoming a "nationally renowned college-prep program", Project GRAD shifted away from the scholarship provider model to a community based model outside of the school district. In 2015, in partnership with the City of Houston and Houston Public Library, Project GRAD brought cafécollege, originally a San Antonio "'one-stop-shop' for free college access advice, guidance, and workshops" to Houston in the form of cafécollege Houston. Staffed by Project GRAD advisors, cafécollege Houston provides free college and career information in English and Spanish to anyone in the greater Houston area.

Project GRAD has had more than 6,800 of its GRAD Scholars enroll in a community college or university and over 2,100 Scholars who have earned a certificate, associate degree or bachelor's degree. cafécollege Houston has welcomed over 10,000 visitors and GRAD has provided its services to more than 4,000 Houstonians.

== New Model ==
On December 27, 2013, The Houston Chronicle reported that Project GRAD Houston phased out its local scholarship grants and pulled out staff from the Houston Independent School District. This is where the college preparatory program was founded more than two decades ago to assist financially needy students at problematic institutions. However, this model continued to be practiced in some areas which include Alaska, Atlanta, and Los Angeles. The non-profit organization maintained a hundred employees during its peak. The ISD also gave Project GRAD a subsidy of $5 million until the platform was scrutinized. The last fund grant worth $1.3 million for the Project came in during the 2011 – 20112 school year. After this, the non-profit deemed it necessary to create a different model. Project GRAD uses its yearly budget ($4 million) for 18 employees and 23 AmeriCorps members in area non-profit offices as well as universities.
