= Texas's 41st House of Representatives district =

American legislative district

Texas's 41st State House of Representatives district
Representative
| Robert Guerra; D–Mission |

District 41 is a district in the Texas House of Representatives. It has been represented by Democrat Robert Guerra since September 5, 2012.

== Geography ==
The district is located in Hidalgo County, Texas.

== Members ==
- John Matthew Moore (January 12, 1897 – January 10, 1899)
- Juan Hinojosa (1983–1991)
- Veronica Gonzales (until 2012)
- Robert Guerra (since 2012)
