= Terry A. Canales =

American politician

Terry Andreas Canales is an American politician.

Canales is from Jim Wells County, Texas. He served in the Texas House of Representatives from 1973 to 1975 and was a Democrat.
