= Texas's 43rd House of Representatives district =

American legislative district

Texas's 43rd State House of Representatives district
Representative
José Manuel Lozano; R–Kingsville

District 43 is a district in the Texas House of Representatives. It has been represented by José Manuel Lozano since he took office in 2011, after he was first elected as a Democrat in the 2010 Texas House of Representatives election.

== Geography ==
The district comprises the counties of Bee, Calhoun, Jim Wells, Kleberg, San Patricio, and Refugio en toto.

== Members ==
- Roger Q. Mills (November 7, 1859 – November 4, 1861)

- William Nesbit "Billy" Hall (before 1987)
- Henry Cuellar (1987–1993)
- Pedro G. Nieto (1993–1995)
- Tracy Ogden King (1995–2003)
- Irma Lerma Rangel (2003)
- Juan Manuel Escobar (2003–2009)
- Tara Rios Ybarra (2009–2011)
- José Manuel Lozano (2011–present)
