= Debra Danburg =

American politician

Debra Danburg was a representative of the Democratic party. She served as a representative in the Houston/Harris district in the state of Texas from 1981 to 2003. Danburg's notable accomplishments include legislation that updated rape laws and amended them to be more gender equal, and legislation to reform punishment for sexual offenders that emphasized reform.

Danburg contributed to the passage of HB 1730, which made important changes in the old rape laws. Under this bill, the term "sexual assault" would replace "rape," updating the terminology to include all genders and all acts of rape and attempted rape. The bill also removed any kind of "pleasure" references.

Danburg was also successful in passing HB 263, which ended spousal exemption from sexual assault. Spouses could now report marital rape, which eventually could lead to prosecution.

Danburg can also be credited with the passage of the "3-G" legislation, which ensured that criminals convicted of capital murder, aggravated kidnapping, aggravated robbery or aggravated sexual assault serve their full sentence without parole, while also supporting alternative punishments that included rehabilitation counseling, restitution centers, and boot camps.

Post-politics, Danburg survived a bout with cancer. She also remarried after moving to Austin.
