= Texas's 35th House of Representatives district =

American legislative district

Texas's 35th State House of Representatives district
Representative
Oscar Longoria; D–Mission
since 2013
- Demographics: 4.3% White; 94.9% Hispanic
- Population (2020) • Voting age: 193,328; 128,027

District 35 is a district in the Texas House of Representatives. It was created in the 3rd Legislature (1849–1851).

The district comprises portions of Cameron and Hidalgo counties. It also includes the cities and Census-designated places of La Feria, San Benito, Duffing, La Homa, La Joya, Penitas, and a small percentage of Brownsville. It has been represented by Oscar Longoria since 2013.
