= Manny Najera =

American politician

Member of the Texas House of Representatives from the 75th district
- In office January 12, 1999 – January 14, 2003
- Preceded by: Gilbert Serna
- Succeeded by: Chente Quintanilla

Personal details
- Party: Democratic

Manny Najera is an American politician who served in the Texas House of Representatives from the 75th district from 1999 to 2003.
