= 2026 Texas House of Representatives election =

- November 3, 2026

All 150 seats in the Texas House of Representatives 76 seats needed for a majority
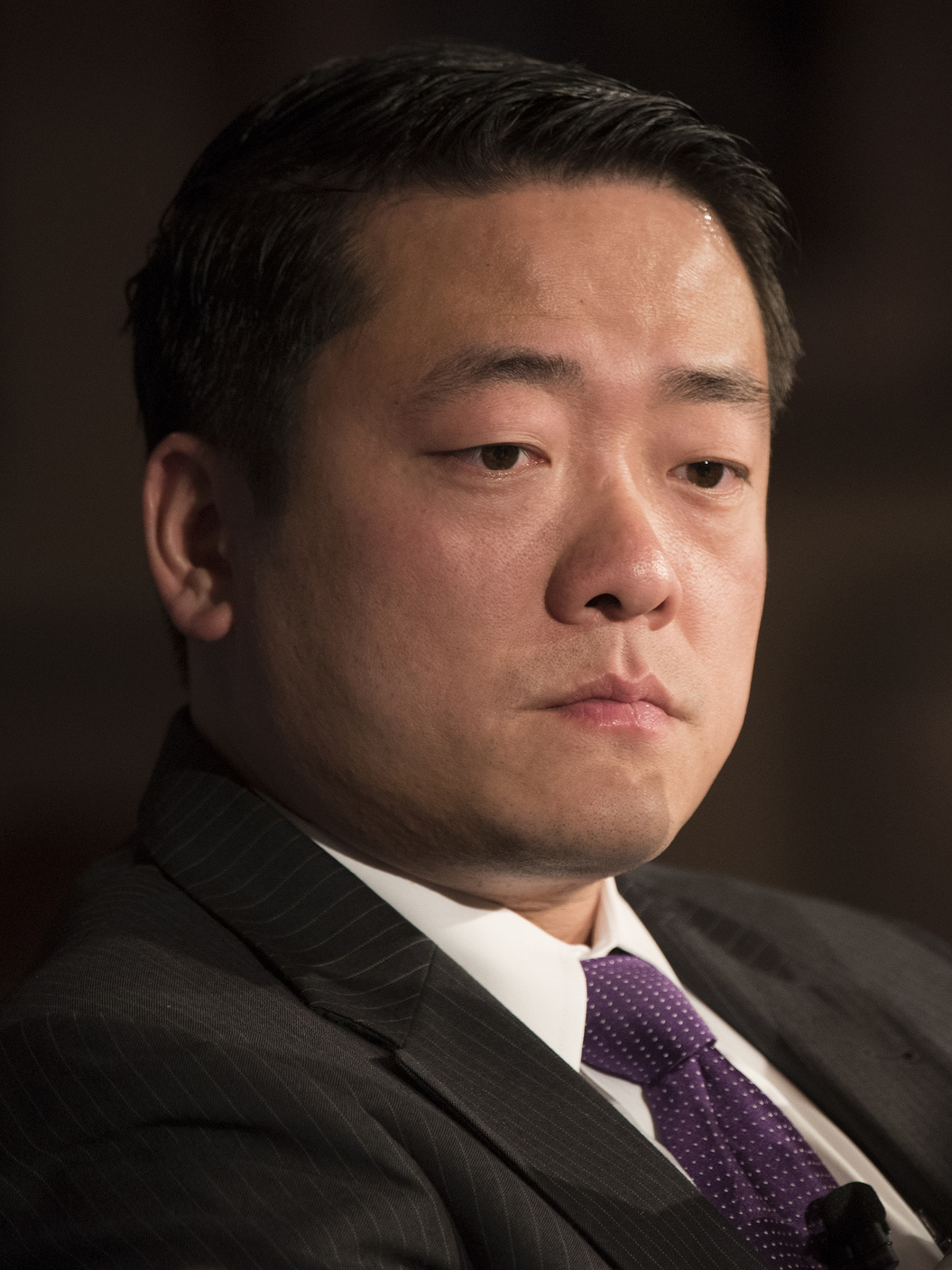

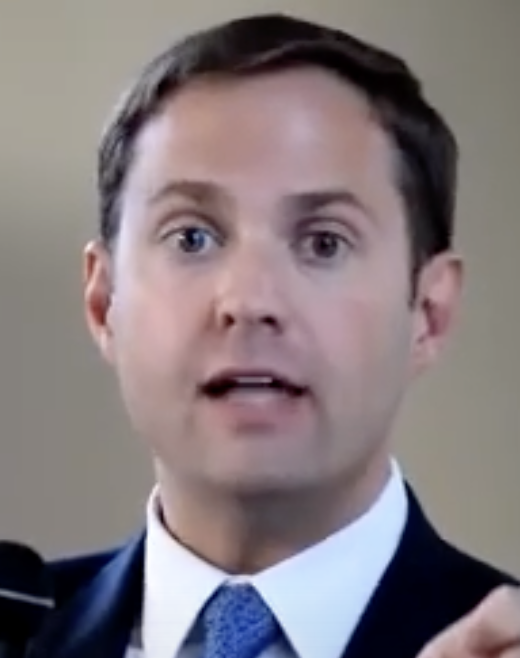
	Majority party	Minority party
Leader	Gene Wu	Dustin Burrows
Party	Democratic	Republican
Leader since	January 14, 2025	January 14, 2025
Leader's seat	137th–Houston	83rd–Lubbock
Last election	62 seats, 43.07%	88 seats, 56.93%
Seats before	62	88
Seats won	83	66
Seat change	▲21	▼21
- Republican hold Democratic hold Democratic gain Results TBD
Speaker before election
Dustin Burrows
Republican
Elected Speaker
TBC
Democratic

The 2026 Texas House of Representatives election was held on November 3, 2026, alongside elections for the state senate. The winners of this election will serve in the 90th legislative session. All 150 seats in the Texas House of Representatives are up for election.

Primary elections were held on March 3, 2026, with runoff primaries occurring on May 26, 2026 in districts where no primary candidate secured a majority of the vote.

For the first time since 2000, Democrats won control of the chamber.

== Background ==
Republicans have controlled the House of Representatives since the 2002 election. The 2024 election marked a considerable shift towards the right among the membership of the House of Representatives. Fifteen Republicans lost their primary elections, with the majority of their challengers backed by governor Greg Abbott over the issue of school vouchers. Republicans flipped two seats in the heavily Hispanic Rio Grande Valley in the general election, increasing their majority to 88 out of 150 seats, with the Democrats holding the other 62.

=== 2025 regular session ===
During the regular session, the legislature passed a number of bills to advance a conservative agenda. The session began, however, with the election of Dustin Burrows as Speaker of the House with the support of most Democrats and some Republicans over more insurgent Republican David Cook.

Long a priority of the most conservative Republicans in the legislature, especially in the Senate, that had historically faced major hurdles in the more moderate House, the passage of school voucher legislation marked the most significant sign of the conservative shift of the chamber in recent years. In 2021, only 29 Republicans had voted in favor of vouchers. Greg Abbott began pushing the issue more strongly in 2022, gaining support from many incumbent Republicans and funding the primary challengers of those who still opposed it. By the time the measure came up for a vote in the 2025 regular session, only two Republicans, Gary VanDeaver and former Speaker Dade Phelan, voted against it, alongside all present Democrats. The bill allocates $1 billion of public funds for children to attend private schools or for their parents to homeschool them, prioritized based on income and disability. President Donald Trump lent his support to the effort and endorsed all Republican legislators who voted in favor of the bill should they seek reelection.

Other conservative hallmarks related to education included requiring public schools to display the Ten Commandments in classrooms, banning diversity, equity, and inclusion policies from public schools, and restricting free speech on college campuses in the wake of Gaza war protests at universities. Other new laws included the tightening of bail, restricting the rights of transgender people, easing access to vaccine exemption, and cutting property taxes. On a more bipartisan basis, the legislature passed bills to alleviate water supply issues, clarify medical exceptions in the state's abortion ban, and ease the construction of housing in amidst the state's growing housing crisis.

Tort reform legislation backed by the influential Texans for Lawsuit Reform (TLR) failed due to opposition from the hardline wing of the Republican caucus.

=== Special sessions and redistricting ===
Greg Abbott had already planned to call a special session to address legislation that did not pass in time during the regular session or that Abbott vetoed, such as a ban on THC products, as well as to address new issues such as deadly flooding in central Texas. At the request of President Donald Trump, Abbott added congressional redistricting to the agenda with the goal of flipping five Democratic-held U.S. House seats to the Republicans in the 2026 elections. In response, most House Democrats left the state on August 3 in order to prevent the establishment of a quorum in the chamber, blocking all legislative activity. The walkout lasted for the entire remaining duration of the first special session, after which Abbott immediately called a second one. Democrats returned to the chamber for the second session. The legislature passed new congressional maps shortly afterwards, and they later passed additional legislation to punish lawmakers who break quorum in the future.

=== District partisanship ===
2024 Presidential data by House district: Trump: 40–50%; 50–60%; 60–70%; 70–80%; 80–90%; Harris: 40–50%; 50–60%; 60–70%; 70–80%

In the 2024 presidential election, Republican Donald Trump won 96 districts while Democrat Kamala Harris won 54 districts. Democrats now hold 8 districts in which Trump won, while Republicans hold no districts won by Harris. Republicans made massive gains across the historically Democratic Rio Grande Valley region in 2024. Most of the Democratic-held districts won by Trump come from this region. Republicans have fielded candidates in 6 of these districts.

District	Trump margin of victory in 2024	Incumbent	Party	First elected	Incumbent margin of victory in 2024
35th district	R+6.9	Oscar Longoria	Democratic	2012	D+100 (Note: Incumbent was unopposed.)
36th district	R+5.7	Sergio Muñoz	Democratic	2010	D+100
39th district	R+2.4	Armando Martinez	Democratic	2004	D+21.8
40th district	R+0.03	Terry Canales	Democratic	2012	D+100
41st district	R+1.6	Robert Guerra (retiring)	Democratic	2010	D+6.9
42nd district	R+0.5	Richard Raymond	Democratic	1992; 1998 (defeated); 2000	D+100
74th district	R+14.67	Eddie Morales	Democratic	2020	D+3.3
144th district	R+2.9	Mary Ann Perez	Democratic	2016	D+100

=== Targeted seats ===
In January 2026, The Democratic Legislative Campaign Committee released the party's target seat list which included five Republican held seats:

- District 34, which Denise Villalobos, R-Corpus Christi, flipped by 11 points
- District 37, which Janie Lopez, R-San Benito, won by 10 points
- District 112, which Angie Chen Button, R-Garland, won by 8 points
- District 118, an open seat that John Lujan, R-San Antonio, won by 3 points
- District 121, which Marc LaHood, R-San Antonio, won by 5 points

In June 2026, the list was expanded to 15 seats, including three Democratic held seats:

- District 41, an open seat that Robert Guerra, D-Mission, won by 7 points
- District 52, which Caroline Harris Davilla, R-Round Rock, won by 12 points
- District 61, which Keresa Richardson, R-McKinney, won by 19 points
- District 67, which Jeff Leach, R-Allen, won by 21 points
- District 70, which Mihaela Plesa, D-Dallas, won by 4 points
- District 74, which Eddie Morales, D-Eagle Pass, won by 3 points
- District 94, an open seat which Tony Tinderholt, R-Arlington, won by 11 points
- District 108, which Morgan Meyer, R-Dallas, won by 15 points
- District 133, which Mano DeAyala, R-Houston, was uncontested
- District 138, which Lacy Hull, R-Houston, won by 14 points

== Retirements and resignations ==
=== Summary ===
Twelve Republicans and seven Democrats are retiring at the end of their terms. Of these, 7 Republicans and 4 Democrats are running for another office. Two Republicans resigned prior to the end of their terms.

=== Republicans ===
1. District 9: Trent Ashby is retiring to run for Texas Senate.
2. District 15: Steve Toth is retiring to run for U.S. Congress 2nd District.
3. District 21: Dade Phelan is retiring.
4. District 71: Stan Lambert is retiring.
5. District 86: John Smithee is retiring.
6. District 94: Tony Tinderholt is retiring to run for Tarrant County Commissioners Court Precinct 2.
7. District 96: David Cook is retiring to run for Texas Senate.
8. District 118: John Lujan retired to run for U.S. Congress 35th District.
9. District 126: Sam Harless is retiring.
10. District 128: Briscoe Cain retired to run for U.S. Congress 9th District.
11. District 129: Dennis Paul is retiring to run for Texas Senate.

=== Democrats ===
1. District 41: Robert Guerra is retiring.
2. District 47: Vikki Goodwin is retiring to run for Lieutenant Governor.
3. District 49: Gina Hinojosa is retiring to run for Governor.
4. District 50: James Talarico is retiring to run for US Senate.
5. District 125: Ray Lopez is retiring.
6. District 131: Alma Allen is retiring.
7. District 135: Jon Rosenthal is retiring to run for Texas Railroad Commissioner.

=== Resignations ===
1. District 1: Gary VanDeaver
2. District 93: Nate Schatzline
3. District 98: Giovanni Capriglione

== Incumbents defeated ==
=== In primary elections ===
Two incumbent Republicans and two incumbent Democrats lost re-nomination to a challenger in their respective primary elections.

==== Republicans ====
1. District 3: Cecil Bell Jr. lost renomination to Kristen Plaisance.
2. District 85: Stan Kitzman lost renomination to Dennis Geesaman.

==== Democrats ====
1. District 101: Chris Turner lost renomination to Junior Ezeonu.
2. District 149: Hubert Vo lost renomination to Darlene Breaux in a runoff election.

=== In general elections ===
==== Republicans ====
1. District 14: Paul Dyson (first elected in 2024) lost to Janet Dudding.
2. District 28: Gary Gates (first elected in 2019 special election) lost to Sandy Ibanez.
3. District 34: Denise Villalobos (first elected in 2024) lost to Stephanie Guerrero Saenz.
4. District 37: Janie Lopez (first elected in 2022) lost to Oziel Ochoa
5. District 52: Caroline Harris Davila (first elected in 2022) lost to Chris Jimenez.
6. District 55: Hilary Hickland (first elected in 2024) lost to Amelia Rabroker.
7. District 63: Ben Bumgarner (first elected in 2022) lost to Denise Wooten.
8. District 80: Don McLaughlin Jr. (first elected in 2024) lost to Cecilia Castellano.
9. District 89: Candy Noble (first elected in 2018) lost to Angie Carraway.
10. District 97: John McQueeney (first elected in 2024) lost to Beth Llewellyn McLaughlin.
11. District 112: Angie Chen Button (first elected in 2008) lost to Zach Herbert.
12. District 121: Marc LaHood (first elected in 2024) lost to Zack Dunn.
13. District 127: Charles Cunningham (first elected in 2022) lost to Michelle Williams.
14. District 132: Mike Schofield (first elected in 2020) lost to Sara McGee.
15. District 138: Lacey Hull (first elected in 2020) lost to Tyler Smith.
16. District 150: Valoree Swanson (first elected in 2016) lost to A'Yonna Kellum.

== Open seats ==
=== Republican seats won by Democrats ===
1. District 93: Won by Ericka Lomick.
2. District 94: Won by Katie O'Brien Duzan.
3. District 96: Won by Ebony Turner.
4. District 118: Won by Kristian Carranza.
5. District 126: Won by Stefanie Bord.

=== Democratic seats held by Democrats ===
1. District 41: Won by Julio Salinas.
2. District 47: Won by Pooja Sethi.
3. District 49: Won by Montserrat Garibay.
4. District 50: Won by Samantha Lopez-Resendez.
5. District 101: Won by Junior Ezeonu.
6. District 125: Won by Adrian Reyna.
7. District 132: Won by Staci Childs.
8. District 135: Won by Odus Evbagharu.
9. District 149: Won by Darlene Breaux.

=== Republican seats held by Republicans ===
1. District 1: Won by Chris Spencer.
2. District 3: Won by Kristen Plaisance.
3. District 9: Won by Rocky Thigpen.
4. District 15: Won by Brad Bailey.
5. District 21: Won by Ray Callas.
6. District 71: Won by Jay Hardaway.
7. District 85: Won by Dennis "Goose" Gessaman.
8. District 86: Won by Holly Jeffreys.
9. District 98: Won by Armin Mizani.
10. District 128: Won by Tom Butler.

== Campaign ==
Ahead of the March primary election, Democrats announced that they had recruited candidates to run in every state and federal race on the ballot, including all 150 House of Representatives districts, a first for either political party in the state's modern history. Governor Greg Abbott pushed to recruit candidates to run in every district in Harris County as well, as part of an attempt to flip the county in his concurrent gubernatorial campaign. With bolstered recruiting in several Trump-won districts in the heavily-Hispanic Rio Grande Valley as well, Republicans are contesting 133 of the state's 150 districts, the most in their party's modern history as well.

=== Statewide primary election ===
In contrast to the 2024 primary, which saw millions of dollars poured into dozens of Republican primary races to oust opponents of school vouchers, the 2026 primary has seen a much smaller field dominated by different political forces. Unlike the right-wing donors who fueled the school voucher push, such as Tim Dunn and Farris Wilks, more primary challengers this cycle have the backing of Texans for Lawsuit Reform, a group which was instrumental in the Republican takeover of the state government in the 1990s and 2000s. Seen as a more establishment conservative organization, TLR's influence in the legislature has waned in recent years as the party has become more dominated by hardline conservatives. They are targeting lawmakers who led the defeat of prominent tort reform bills in the previous legislative session.

Very few incumbent legislators lost renomination compared to 2024, despite the substantial financial backing many challengers received. Two Republican challengers backed by billionaire Tim Dunn won, but no challengers backed by TLR or pro-casino groups defeated any incumbents. Former Democratic leader Chris Turner lost renomination in a major upset, while two other Democratic incumbents were forced into runoffs. In the runoff election, Democrat Hubert Vo lost renomination, but no other incumbents were defeated.

=== General election ===
For the first time in several election cycles, the Democratic Legislative Campaign Committee is putting significant funding into Texas House races in anticipation of a possible nationwide wave election. They initially targeted five Republican-held seats, focused in the Rio Grande Valley and the state's suburban areas, which Democrats have either lost or narrowed Republican margins in recent years. After Republicans nominated embattled attorney general Ken Paxton for U.S. Senate in the May runoff, the DLCC greatly expanded its target list to twelve Republican-held seats, the same number they flipped in the 2018 election, in anticipation of a more favorable electoral environment. The new targets are primarily suburban seats, especially in North Texas, that Donald Trump won by between six and fifteen percentage points in the 2024 presidential election. As the election campaign progressed, many Republicans expressed concern about the party's ability to maintain their large majority in the chamber, in contrast to previous years, where these projections came mostly from Democrats. Despite these concerns, most observers still consider Republicans to be overwhelmingly favored to maintain control.

In September, representative Mitch Little of the hardline conservative wing of the Republican caucus announced that the party would not moderate its agenda in the event that Democrats make significant gains in the legislature, drawing a sharp contrast to the character of the legislatures after previous Democratic wave elections in 2008 and 2018. House Speaker Dustin Burrows has spent considerable time and resources campaigning for and coordinating with Republican candidates to maintain the party's majority, even aiding in districts won by Trump by upwards of 35 points in 2024. Political observers have compared the level of activity across the state to 2020, the last time control of the chamber was considered seriously in play, likening the political environment to 2018, when the state held a similarly competitive U.S. Senate race to the one at the top of the ticket in 2026.

== Predictions ==
=== Statewide ===
Election forecasters did not anticipate control of the chamber to shift, but they considered Democrats likely to pick up seats, especially given the competitive U.S. Senate race held concurrently to these elections.

Source	Ranking	As of
Sabato's Crystal Ball	Likely R	October 16, 2026
State Navigate	Likely R	October 29, 2026

=== Competitive districts ===
District	Incumbent	Previous result	State Navigate (Note: Ratings simplified from percentages: <60% = "Tilt"; 60–75% = "Lean"; 75–95% = "Likely"; >95% = "Safe") Oct. 29, 2026	Capitol Inside Oct. 29, 2026	Results
14th	Paul Dyson	60.46% R	Likely R	Likely R	D (flip)
20th	Terry Wilson	59.76% R	Likely R	Lean R	R
26th	Matt Morgan	59.17% R	Likely R	Likely R	R
28th	Gary Gates	60.55% R	Likely R	Likely R	D (flip)
29th	Jeff Barry	61.52% R	Safe R	Likely R	R
32nd	Todd Hunter	61.52% R	Safe R	Likely R	R
34th	Denise Villalobos	55.37% R	Likely D (flip)	Likely D (flip)	D (flip)
35th	Oscar Longoria	100.00% D	Safe D	Likely D	D
37th	Janie Lopez	55.01% R	Lean D (flip)	Lean D (flip)	D (flip)
40th	Terry Canales	100.00% D	Safe D	Likely D	D
41st	Bobby Guerra (retiring)	53.47% D	Safe D	Likely D	D
42nd	Richard Raymond	100.00% D	Safe D	Likely D	D
52nd	Caroline Harris	56.24% R	Tilt D (flip)	Lean D (flip)	D (flip)
54th	Brad Buckley	61.09% R	Likely R	Likely R	R
55th	Hillary Hickland	57.41% R	Likely R	Likely R	D (flip)
57th	Richard Hayes	58.27% R	Likely R	Likely R	R
61st	Keresa Richardson	59.62% R	Likely R	Lean R	
63rd	Ben Bumgarner	55.66% R	Tilt D (flip)	Lean D (flip)	D (flip)
65th	Mitch Little	60.30% R	Likely R	Likely R	R
66th	Matt Shaheen	61.11% R	Likely R	Lean R	R
67th	Jeff Leach	60.23% R	Likely R	Lean R	R
70th	Mihaela Plesa	52.22% D	Safe D	Likely D	D
74th	Eddie Morales	51.67% D	Likely D	Likely D	D
80th	Don McLaughlin	59.49% R	Likely R	Toss-Up	D (flip)
89th	Candy Noble	60.63% R	Likely R	Lean R	D (flip)
93rd	Nate Schatzline (resigned early)	60.55% R	Safe R	Likely R	D (flip)
94th	Tony Tinderholt (retiring)	55.62% R	Tilt D (flip)	Toss-Up	D (flip)
96th	David Cook (retiring)	57.37% R	Likely R	Toss-Up	D (flip)
97th	John McQueeney	58.07% R	Lean R	Toss-Up (flip)	D
99th	Charlie Geren	62.82% R	Safe R	Likely R	R
106th	Jared Patterson	60.58% R	Likely R	Likely R	R
108th	Morgan Meyer	57.61% R	Tilt R	Toss-Up	R
112th	Angie Chen Button	53.87% R	Likely D (flip)	Lean D (flip)	D (flip)
118th	John Lujan (retiring)	51.73% R	Likely D (flip)	Likely D (flip)	D (flip)
121st	Marc LaHood	52.53% R	Likely D (flip)	Lean D (flip)	D (flip)
122nd	Mark Dorazio	58.09% R	Lean R	Toss-Up	R
127th	Charles Cunningham	60.51% R	Likely R	Likely R	D (flip)
129th	Dennis Paul (retiring)	60.83% R	Likely R	Lean R	R
132nd	Mike Schofield	58.76% R	Likely R	Lean R	D (flip)
133rd	Mano DeAyala	100.0% R	Likely R	Toss-Up	R
138th	Lacey Hull	57.02% R	Tilt R	Lean D (flip)	D (flip)
144th	Mary Ann Perez	100.00% D	Safe D	Likely D	D
150th	Valoree Swanson	59.86% R	Likely R	Safe R	D (flip)
Overall			Rep – 80; Dem – 70	Rep – 73; Dem – 70; 7 tossups	Dem – 82; Rep – 66; 1 uncalled

== Polling ==
Poll source	Date(s) administered	Sample size (Note: Key: A – all adults RV – registered voters LV – likely voters V – unclear)	Margin of error	Republican Party	Democratic Party	Other	Undecided
Texas Public Opinion Research	October 15–18, 2026	969 (LV)	± 3.9%	51%	49%	–	–
University of Texas/Texas Politics Project	September 25 – October 5, 2026	861 (LV)	± 3.3%	49%	48%	2%	1%
Stratus Intelligence (R) (Note: Poll sponsored by Texans for a Conservative Majority)	September 22–24, 2026	856 (LV)	± 3.5%	50%	46%	—	4%
University of Texas/Texas Politics Project	August 5–13, 2026	1,200 (RV)	± 2.83%	49%	43%	2%	6%
University of Texas/Texas Politics Project	June 5–12, 2026	1,200 (RV)	± 2.8% (Note: ±3.4% adjusted for weighting)	50%	44%	2%	4%
University of Texas/Texas Politics Project	April 10–20, 2026	1,200 (RV)	± 2.83% (Note: ±3.35% adjusted for weighting)	44%	40%	2%	14%
University of Texas/ Texas Politics Project	February 2–16, 2026	1,300 (RV)	± 5.1%	43%	42%	3%	14%

== Summary of results ==
Amid a nationwide Democratic wave election, Democrats flipped the House, winning it for the first time since the 2000 election. They won Republican-held seats across the state, including in the Rio Grande Valley and the suburbs of San Antonio, Austin, Houston, Dallas, and Fort Worth, as well as leading races in smaller cities such as Killeen and College Station. Alongside their victory in the gubernatorial election, Democrats broke up the Republican trifecta that had governed the state since 2003, but they did not win a trifecta of their own, failing to pick up any new seats in the Texas Senate. Democrats' net gain of seats was their largest since 1872 at the end of Reconstruction, the last time they flipped control of the chamber from the Republicans.

=== Statewide ===
Summary of the November 3, 2026 Texas House of Representatives election results
Party	Candidates	Votes	%	Seats	+/–	%
Republican	133		%			%
Democratic	150		%			%
Libertarian	3		%			%
Green	2		%			%
Write-in	1		%			%
**Total**	**289**		**100.00%**	**150**	–	

=== By district ===
† - Incumbent not seeking re-election ‡ - Incumbent defeated in primary. Bold indicates a seat that changed parties.

District	2024 Pres.	Incumbent	Party	Elected Representative	Party
1st	R+55.7	Gary VanDeaver†	Rep	Chris Spencer	Rep
2nd	R+63.0	Brent Money	Rep	Brent Money	Rep
3rd	R+52.3	Cecil Bell Jr.‡	Rep	Kristen Plaisance	Rep
4th	R+35.0	Keith Bell	Rep	Keith Bell	Rep
5th	R+64.6	Cole Hefner	Rep	Cole Hefner	Rep
6th	R+41.6	Daniel Alders	Rep	Daniel Alders	Rep
7th	R+45.9	Jay Dean	Rep	Jay Dean	Rep
8th	R+61.1	Cody Harris	Rep	Cody Harris	Rep
9th	R+58.0	Trent Ashby†	Rep	Rocky Thigpen	Rep
10th	R+31.0	Brian Harrison	Rep	Brian Harrison	Rep
11th	R+56.3	Joanne Shofner	Rep	Joanne Shofner	Rep
12th	R+49.4	Trey Wharton	Rep	Trey Wharton	Rep
13th	R+51.1	Angelia Orr	Rep	Angelia Orr	Rep
14th	R+20.8	Paul Dyson	Rep	Janet Dudding	**Dem**
15th	R+27.0	Steve Toth†	Rep	Brad Bailey	Rep
16th	R+56.4	Will Metcalf	Rep	Will Metcalf	Rep
17th	R+31.8	Stan Gerdes	Rep	Stan Gerdes	Rep
18th	R+65.3	Janis Holt	Rep	Janis Holt	Rep
19th	R+42.2	Ellen Troxclair	Rep	Ellen Troxclair	Rep
20th	R+14.6	Terry Wilson	Rep	Terry Wilson	Rep
21st	R+58.2	Dade Phelan†	Rep	Ray Callas	Rep
22nd	D+11.9	Christian Manuel	Dem	Christian Manuel	Dem
23rd	R+29.4	Terri Leo Wilson	Rep	Terri Leo Wilson	Rep
24th	R+35.2	Greg Bonnen	Rep	Greg Bonnen	Rep
25th	R+19.4	Cody Vasut	Rep	Cody Vasut	Rep
26th	R+15.4	Matt Morgan	Rep	Matt Morgan	Rep
27th	D+35.1	Ron Reynolds	Dem	Ron Reynolds	Dem
28th	R+16.8	Gary Gates	Rep	Sandy Ibanez	**Dem**
29th	R+19.9	Jeff Barry	Rep	Jeff Barry	Rep
30th	R+54.2	AJ Louderback	Rep	AJ Louderback	Rep
31st	R+36.9	Ryan Guillen	Rep	Ryan Guillen	Rep
32nd	R+25.2	Todd Hunter	Rep	Todd Hunter	Rep
33rd	R+25.9	Katrina Pierson	Rep	Katrina Pierson	Rep
34th	R+1.4	Denise Villalobos	Rep	Stephanie Guerrero Saenz	**Dem**
35th	R+6.9	Oscar Longoria	Dem	Oscar Longoria	Dem
36th	R+5.7	Sergio Munoz	Dem	Sergio Munoz	Dem
37th	R+10.9	Janie Lopez	Rep	Oziel Ochoa	**Dem**
38th	R+0.7	Erin Gamez	Dem	Erin Gamez	Dem
39th	R+2.4	Armando Martinez	Dem	Armando Martinez	Dem
40th	R+0.1	Terry Canales	Dem	Terry Canales	Dem
41st	R+1.6	Robert Guerra†	Dem	Julio Salinas	Dem
42nd	R+0.5	Richard Raymond	Dem	Richard Raymond	Dem
43rd	R+31.3	José Manuel Lozano	Rep	José Manuel Lozano	Rep
44th	R+31.5	Alan Schoolcraft	Rep	Alan Schoolcraft	Rep
45th	D+12.8	Erin Zwiener	Dem	Erin Zwiener	Dem
46th	D+44.0	Sheryl Cole	Dem	Sheryl Cole	Dem
47th	D+22.3	Vikki Goodwin†	Dem	Pooja Sethi	Dem
48th	D+40.4	Donna Howard	Dem	Donna Howard	Dem
49th	D+60.3	Gina Hinojosa†	Dem	Montserrat Garibay	Dem
50th	D+47.6	James Talarico†	Dem	Samantha Lopez-Resendez	Dem
51st	D+53.0	Lulu Flores	Dem	Lulu Flores	Dem
52nd	R+8.2	Caroline Harris Davila	Rep	Chris Jimenez	**Dem**
53rd	R+55.8	Wes Virdell	Rep	Wes Virdell	Rep
54th	R+16.8	Brad Buckley	Rep	Brad Buckley	Rep
55th	R+15.6	Hillary Hickland	Rep	Amelia Rabroker	**Dem**
56th	R+36.0	Pat Curry	Rep	Pat Curry	Rep
57th	R+17.3	Richard Hayes	Rep	Richard Hayes	Rep
58th	R+52.5	Helen Kerwin	Rep	Helen Kerwin	Rep
59th	R+59.4	Shelby Slawson	Rep	Shelby Slawson	Rep
60th	R+66.9	Mike Olcott	Rep	Mike Olcott	Rep
61st	R+14.7	Keresa Richardson	Rep		
62nd	R+57.9	Shelley Luther	Rep	Shelley Luther	Rep
63rd	R+10.5	Ben Bumgarner	Rep	Denise Wooten	**Dem**
64th	R+25.9	Andy Hopper	Rep	Andy Hopper	Rep
65th	R+16.6	Mitch Little	Rep	Mitch Little	Rep
66th	R+14.6	Matt Shaheen	Rep	Matt Shaheen	Rep
67th	R+14.5	Jeff Leach	Rep	Jeff Leach	Rep
68th	R+72.5	David Spiller	Rep	David Spiller	Rep
69th	R+54.8	James Frank	Rep	James Frank	Rep
70th	D+5.6	Mihaela Plesa	Dem	Mihaela Plesa	Dem
71st	R+55.2	Stan Lambert†	Rep	Jay Hardaway	Rep
72nd	R+56.2	Drew Darby	Rep	Drew Darby	Rep
73rd	R+39.7	Carrie Isaac	Rep	Carrie Isaac	Rep
74th	R+14.7	Eddie Morales	Dem	Eddie Morales	Dem
75th	D+4.7	Mary González	Dem	Mary González	Dem
76th	D+8.3	Suleman Lalani	Dem	Suleman Lalani	Dem
77th	D+31.2	Vince Perez	Dem	Vince Perez	Dem
78th	D+9.1	Joe Moody	Dem	Joe Moody	Dem
79th	D+19.1	Claudia Ordaz Perez	Dem	Claudia Ordaz Perez	Dem
80th	R+23.3	Don McLaughlin	Rep	Cecilia Castellano	**Dem**
81st	R+54.6	Brooks Landgraf	Rep	Brooks Landgraf	Rep
82nd	R+60.9	Tom Craddick	Rep	Tom Craddick	Rep
83rd	R+56.4	Dustin Burrows	Rep	Dustin Burrows	Rep
84th	R+27.2	Carl Tepper	Rep	Carl Tepper	Rep
85th	R+41.7	Stan Kitzman‡	Rep	Goose Gessaman	Rep
86th	R+61.8	John T. Smithee†	Rep	Holly Jeffreys	Rep
87th	R+58.3	Caroline Fairly	Rep	Caroline Fairly	Rep
88th	R+70.5	Ken King	Rep	Ken King	Rep
89th	R+17.2	Candy Noble	Rep	Angie Carraway	**Dem**
90th	D+26.9	Ramon Romero Jr.	Dem	Ramon Romero Jr.	Dem
91st	R+21.8	David Lowe	Rep	David Lowe	Rep
92nd	D+15.2	Salman Bhojani	Dem	Salman Bhojani	Dem
93rd	R+19.2	Nate Schatzline†	Rep	Ericka Lomick	**Dem**
94th	R+9.6	Tony Tinderholt†	Rep	Katie O'Brien Duzan	**Dem**
95th	D+41.3	Nicole Collier	Dem	Nicole Collier	Dem
96th	R+10.6	David Cook†	Rep	Ebony Turner	**Dem**
97th	R+10.5	John McQueeney	Rep	Beth Llewellyn McLaughlin	**Dem**
98th	R+26.2	Giovanni Capriglione†	Rep	Armin Mizani	Rep
99th	R+20.6	Charlie Geren	Rep	Charlie Geren	Rep
100th	D+54.5	Venton Jones	Dem	Venton Jones	Dem
101st	D+26.6	Chris Turner‡	Dem	Junior Ezeonu	Dem
102nd	D+19.6	Ana-Maria Rodriguez Ramos	Dem	Ana-Maria Rodriguez Ramos	Dem
103rd	D+34.3	Rafael Anchía	Dem	Rafael Anchía	Dem
104th	D+25.1	Jessica González	Dem	Jessica González	Dem
105th	D+6.5	Terry Meza	Dem	Terry Meza	Dem
106th	R+16.9	Jared Patterson	Rep	Jared Patterson	Rep
107th	D+18.4	Linda Garcia	Dem	Linda Garcia	Dem
108th	R+5.6	Morgan Meyer	Rep	Morgan Meyer	Rep
109th	D+51.8	Aicha Davis	Dem	Aicha Davis	Dem
110th	D+55.8	Toni Rose	Dem	Toni Rose	Dem
111th	D+50.7	Yvonne Davis	Dem	Yvonne Davis	Dem
112th	R+3.4	Angie Chen Button	Rep	Zach Herbert	**Dem**
113th	D+12.2	Rhetta Bowers	Dem	Rhetta Bowers	Dem
114th	D+27.8	John Bryant	Dem	John Bryant	Dem
115th	D+11.8	Cassandra Hernandez	Dem	Cassandra Hernandez	Dem
116th	D+27.5	Trey Martinez Fischer	Dem	Trey Martinez Fischer	Dem
117th	D+11.9	Philip Cortez	Dem	Philip Cortez	Dem
118th	R+4.5	John Lujan†	Rep	Kristian Carranza	**Dem**
119th	D+19.6	Elizabeth Campos	Dem	Elizabeth Campos	Dem
120th	D+25.7	Barbara Gervin-Hawkins	Dem	Barbara Gervin-Hawkins	Dem
121st	R+4.8	Marc LaHood	Rep	Zack Dunn	**Dem**
122nd	R+11.3	Mark Dorazio	Rep	Mark Dorazio	Rep
123rd	D+26.6	Diego Bernal	Dem	Diego Bernal	Dem
124th	D+22.1	Josey Garcia	Dem	Josey Garcia	Dem
125th	D+14.9	Ray Lopez†	Dem	Adrian Reyna	Dem
126th	R+18.1	Sam Harless†	Rep	Stefanie Bord	**Dem**
127th	R+15.0	Charles Cunningham	Rep	Michelle Williams	**Dem**
128th	R+38.2	Briscoe Cain†	Rep	Tom Butler	Rep
129th	R+17.7	Dennis Paul†	Rep	Scott Bowen	Rep
130th	R+33.9	Tom Oliverson	Rep	Tom Oliverson	Rep
131st	D+48.0	Alma Allen†	Dem	Staci Childs	Dem
132nd	R+13.9	Mike Schofield	Rep	Sara McGee	**Dem**
133rd	R+7.0	Mano DeAyala	Rep	Mano DeAyala	Rep
134th	D+25.3	Ann Johnson	Dem	Ann Johnson	Dem
135th	D+7.8	Jon Rosenthal†	Dem	Odus Evbagharu	Dem
136th	D+23.8	John Bucy III	Dem	John Bucy III	Dem
137th	D+17.9	Gene Wu	Dem	Gene Wu	Dem
138th	R+8.5	Lacey Hull	Rep	Tyler Smith	**Dem**
139th	D+38.1	Charlene Ward Johnson	Dem	Charlene Ward Johnson	Dem
140th	D+17.0	Armando Walle	Dem	Armando Walle	Dem
141st	D+50.5	Senfronia Thompson	Dem	Senfronia Thompson	Dem
142nd	D+37.7	Harold Dutton Jr.	Dem	Harold Dutton Jr.	Dem
143rd	D+13.7	Ana Hernandez	Dem	Ana Hernandez	Dem
144th	R+2.9	Mary Ann Perez	Dem	Mary Ann Perez	Dem
145th	D+32.7	Christina Morales	Dem	Christina Morales	Dem
146th	D+53.7	Lauren Ashley Simmons	Dem	Lauren Ashley Simmons	Dem
147th	D+51.3	Jolanda Jones	Dem	Jolanda Jones	Dem
148th	D+8.7	Penny Morales Shaw	Dem	Penny Morales Shaw	Dem
149th	D+10.7	Hubert Vo‡	Dem	Darlene Breaux	Dem
150th	R+16.3	Valoree Swanson	Rep	A'Yonna Kellum	**Dem**

== Detailed results ==
Results according to the Texas Secretary of State. Precinct results compiled by the Texas Legislative Council.

=== District 1 ===
Incumbent Republican Gary VanDeaver retired. In 2024, VanDeaver faced and narrowly defeated an Abbott-backed primary challenger due to his opposition to the proposed school voucher legislation. Going into the 2025 legislative session, he voted against the proposed $1 billion school voucher program. As a result, on October 11, 2025, the Texas GOP issued a censure against VanDeaver, but stopped short of implementing newly adopted rules that would have barred VanDeaver from running in the Republican primary. Chris Spencer, who ran against VanDeaver in 2024, announced a campaign to succeed him. He faced businessman Josh Bray. During the campaign, Bray faced criticism for having voted in the 2008 Democratic presidential primary, as well as for his donations to Democratic officials, including former state representative Mark Homer. Spencer, who was endorsed by governor Abbott, defeated Bray in the Republican primary by a 503-vote margin. VanDeaver resigned from his seat early on September 21. Spencer defeated Democrat Sean Huffman in the general election.

District 1 Republican primary
Party	Candidate	Votes	%
Republican	Chris Spencer	14,924	50.86%
Republican	Josh Bray	14,421	49.14%
Total votes		29,345	100.0%

District 1 general election
Party	Candidate	Votes	%
Republican	Chris Spencer		
Democratic	Sean Huffman		
Total votes			

=== District 2 ===
Incumbent Republican Brent Money was re-elected, defeating Democrat Fatima La-Juan Muse.

District 2 general election
Party	Candidate	Votes	%
Republican	Brent Money (incumbent)		
Democratic	Fatima La'Juan Muse		
Total votes			

=== District 3 ===
Incumbent Republican Cecil Bell Jr ran for re-election. Bell was reprimanded by the Montgomery County Republican Party over his support of Dustin Burrows over David Cook for Speaker of the House during the previous legislative session. Bell lost in the Republican primary to Kristen Plaisance, who was backed by billionaire Tim Dunn. Plaisance faced Democratic nominee Nicole King in the general election. Plaisance won by a large margin.

District 3 Republican primary
Party	Candidate	Votes	%
Republican	Kristen Plaisance	14,004	55.05%
Republican	Cecil Bell Jr. (incumbent)	11,436	44.95%
Total votes		25,440	100.0%

District 3 Democratic primary
Party	Candidate	Votes	%
Democratic	Nicole King	5,669	68.59%
Democratic	James Alvarado	2,596	31.41%
Total votes		8,265	100.0%

District 3 general election
Party	Candidate	Votes	%
Republican	Kristen Plaisance		
Democratic	Nicole King		
Total votes			

=== District 4 ===
Incumbent Republican Keith Bell ran for re-election facing Democrat Mark Mosely in the general election. Bell won the election by a large margin.

District 4 general election
Party	Candidate	Votes	%
Republican	Keith Bell (incumbent)		
Democratic	Mark A. Moseley		
Total votes			

=== District 5 ===
Incumbent Republican Cole Hefner was re-elected defeating Democrat Hector Garza by a large margin.

District 5 Republican primary
Party	Candidate	Votes	%
Republican	Cole Hefner (incumbent)	22,446	76.47%
Republican	Dewey Collier	6,908	23.53%
Total votes		29,354	100.0%

District 5 general election
Party	Candidate	Votes	%
Republican	Cole Hefner (incumbent)		
Democratic	Hector Garza		
Total votes			

=== District 6 ===
Incumbent Republican Daniel Alders ran for re-election. He defeated Democrat Lorenzo Johnson in the general election.

District 6 general election
Party	Candidate	Votes	%
Republican	Daniel Alders		
Democratic	Lorenzo Johnson		
Total votes			

=== District 7 ===
Incumbent Republican Jay Dean ran for re-election. Dean accused his primary opponent, Melissa Beckett, of wanting to eliminate the state's pension program for teachers, which Beckett denied, filing a defamation lawsuit against Dean for the accusation. Dean won the primary and faced Democrat Fantasha Allen in the generale election. Dean was re-elected by a large margin.

District 7 Republican primary
Party	Candidate	Votes	%
Republican	Jay Dean (incumbent)	11,905	54.91%
Republican	Melissa Beckett	9,777	45.09%
Total votes		21,682	100.0%

District 7 Democratic primary
Party	Candidate	Votes	%
Democratic	Fantasha Allen	6,420	71.40%
Democratic	Corby Heath	2,572	28.60%
Total votes		8,992	100.0%

District 7 general election
Party	Candidate	Votes	%
Republican	Jay Dean (incumbent)		
Democratic	Fantasha Allen		
Total votes			

=== District 8 ===
Incumbent Republican Cody Harris ran for re-election. He defeated Daniel Hunt in the Republican primary, with the two candidates sparring over water conservation and welling policy. Harris had sought to block the construction of new wells in East Texas during the previous legislative session. Harris faced Democrat Jeff Chavez in the general election, which Harris won by a large margin.

District 8 Republican primary
Party	Candidate	Votes	%
Republican	Cody Harris (incumbent)	19,251	74.71%
Republican	Daniel Hunt	6,518	25.29%
Total votes		25,769	100.0%

District 8 general election
Party	Candidate	Votes	%
Republican	Cody Harris (incumbent)		
Democratic	Jeff Chavez		
Total votes			

=== District 9 ===
Incumbent Republican Trent Ashby retired to run for Texas Senate, to replace retiring Senator Robert Nichols. Three candidates ran in the Republican primary to replace him, all running on platforms emphasizing the protection of water rights in East Texas. Ashby did not endorse any potential successor. Retired DPS Trooper Rocky Thigpen won the primary and faced Democrat Shelly Tatum in the general election. Thigpen won the race by a large margin.

District 9 Republican primary
Party	Candidate	Votes	%
Republican	Rocky Thigpen	22,301	76.95%
Republican	Paulette Carson	5,667	19.55%
Republican	Stephanie Sjöberg	1,012	3.49%
Total votes		28,980	100.0%

District 9 general election
Party	Candidate	Votes	%
Republican	Rocky Thigpen		
Democratic	Shelly Tatum		
Total votes			

=== District 10 ===
Incumbent Republican Brian Harrison ran for re-election. Harrison defeated opponents Matt Authier and Jon Gattett in the primary. He defeated Democrat Michael Myers in the general election.

District 10 Republican primary
Party	Candidate	Votes	%
Republican	Brian Harrison (incumbent)	12,503	53.39%
Republican	Matt Authier	5,707	24.37%
Republican	Jon Garrett	5,208	22.24%
Total votes		23,418	100.0%

District 10 general election
Party	Candidate	Votes	%
Republican	Brian Harrison (incumbent)		
Democratic	Michael Myers		
Total votes			

=== District 11 ===
Incumbent Republican Joanne Shofner was re-elected.

District 11 general election
Party	Candidate	Votes	%
Republican	Joanne Shofner (incumbent)		
Democratic	Roxanne Lathan		
Total votes			

=== District 12 ===
Incumbent Republican Trey Wharton was re-elected.

District 12 general election
Party	Candidate	Votes	%
Republican	Trey Wharton (incumbent)		
Democratic	Andie Ho		
Total votes			

=== District 13 ===
Incumbent Republican Angelia Orr ran for re-election. On October 11, 2025, the Texas GOP issued a censure against Orr, but stopped short of implementing newly adopted rules that would have barred Orr from running in the Republican primary. Despite this, Orr received endorsements from several state and national Republicans, including Greg Abbott, Donald Trump, and Ted Cruz. Challenger Kat Wall, campaigning on more locally focused issues, was endorsed by five of the seven Republican county chairs in the district and received financial backing from billionaire Tim Dunn, but lost to Orr in the primary. Orr defeated Democrat Albert Hunter in the general election.

District 13 Republican primary
Party	Candidate	Votes	%
Republican	Angelia Orr (incumbent)	13,230	55.75%
Republican	Kathaleen "Kat" Wall	10,502	44.25%
Total votes		23,732	100.0%

District 13 general election
Party	Candidate	Votes	%
Republican	Angelia Orr (incumbent)		
Democratic	Albert Hunter		
Total votes			

=== District 14 ===
Incumbent Republican Paul Dyson ran for re-election. He faced Democrat Janet Dudding, who had been the Democratic nominee for Comptroller in 2022, in the general election. Dyson had a significant advantage in fundraising with the campaign raising over $425,000 compared to Dudding's less than $10,000. Dyson narrowly lost the election to Dudding by a margin of 309 votes.

District 14 Democratic primary
Party	Candidate	Votes	%
Democratic	Janet Tycelia Dudding	7,066	67.35%
Democratic	David Kessler	3,426	32.65%
Total votes		10,492	100.0%

District 14 general election
Party	Candidate	Votes	%
Republican	Paul Dyson (incumbent)		
Democratic	Janet Tycelia Dudding		
Libertarian	Jeff Miller		
Total votes			

=== District 15 ===
Incumbent Republican Steve Toth retired to run for the U.S. House of Representatives. Brad Bailey, township chair of The Woodlands, received the Republican nomination to replace him. Other candidates in the race included Democratic candidate Moniqua S. Scott and Jessi Cowart, the Vice Chair of the Libertarian Party of Texas Bailey won the general election.

District 15 general election
Party	Candidate	Votes	%
Republican	Brad Bailey	45,484	56.87%
Democratic	Moniqua S. Scott	31,979	39.98%
Libertarian	Jessi Cowart	2,516	3.15%
Total votes		79,979	100%

=== District 16 ===
Incumbent Republican Will Metcalf ran for re-election. Metcalf was reprimanded by the Montgomery County Republican Party over his support of Dustin Burrows over David Cook for Speaker of the House during the previous legislative session. Metcalf won the Republican primary despite the reprimand and faced Democrat Bobbie Clayton in the general election. Metcalf won re-election by a wide margin.

District 16 Republican primary
Party	Candidate	Votes	%
Republican	Will Metcalf (incumbent)	17,969	65.81%
Republican	Jon Bouche	9,334	34.19%
Total votes		27,303	100.0%

District 16 general election
Party	Candidate	Votes	%
Republican	Will Metcalf (incumbent)		
Democratic	Bobbie Clayton		
Total votes			

=== District 17 ===
Incumbent Republican Stan Gerdes ran for re-election. In the Republican primary he defeated Tom Glass, who challenged him in the 2024 primary. Gerdes defeated Democrat Mary Elizabeth Klenz in the general election.

District 17 Republican primary
Party	Candidate	Votes	%
Republican	Stan Gerdes (incumbent)	13,206	60.71%
Republican	Tom Glass	8,548	39.29%
Total votes		21,754	100.0%

District 17 Democratic primary
Party	Candidate	Votes	%
Democratic	Mary Elizabeth Klenz	7,735	60.17%
Democratic	Frank Gomez, III	3,401	26.46%
Democratic	Robert Salter	1,719	13.37%
Total votes		12,855	100.0%

District 17 general election
Party	Candidate	Votes	%
Republican	Stan Gerdes (incumbent)		
Democratic	Mary Elizabeth Klenz		
Total votes			

=== District 18 ===
Incumbent Republican Janis Holt was re-elected.

District 18 general election
Party	Candidate	Votes	%
Republican	Janis Holt (incumbent)		
Democratic	Valorie Barton		
Total votes			

=== District 19 ===
Incumbent Republican Ellen Troxclair ran for re-election. Democrat candidate Kelly Hall dropped out of the race in January to run for mayor of Round Rock, after the deadline to have his name removed from the ballot. Despite raising no money, spending no time campaigning and openly endorsing his opponent, Hall won the primary by a wide margin. Hall attempted to withdraw from the race and allow the party to replace him with his opponent, Javi Andrade. He was later declared ineligible to run for mayor of Round Rock, though he remained on the ballot and received only 17% of the vote. Hall was eventually replaced on the general election ballot by Tom Luck. Troxclair defeated Luck by a large margin.

District 19 Republican primary
Party	Candidate	Votes	%
Republican	Ellen Troxclair (incumbent)	29,000	78.66%
Republican	George Cambanis	7,866	21.34%
Total votes		36,866	100.0%

District 19 Democratic primary
Party	Candidate	Votes	%
Democratic	Kelly Hall (withdrawn)	7,915	60.14%
Democratic	Javi Andrade	5,246	39.86%
Total votes		13,161	100.0%

District 19 general election
Party	Candidate	Votes	%
Republican	Ellen Troxclair (incumbent)		
Democratic	Tom Luck		
Total votes			

=== District 20 ===
Incumbent Republican Terry Wilson ran for re-election. He was challenged by Democrat Matthias-Jonah Early, a recent graduate from the University of Texas at Arlington, in the suburban Williamson County district. Wilson received the endorsement of the Austin American-Statesman. Wilson narrowly defeated by Early in the general election.

District 20 general election
Party	Candidate	Votes	%
Republican	Terry Wilson (incumbent)		
Democratic	Matthias-Jonah Early		
Total votes			

=== District 21 ===
Incumbent Republican former Speaker of the House Dade Phelan retired. On October 11, 2025, after Phelan had announced his retirement, the Republican Party of Texas issued a censure against Phelan, but stopped short of implementing newly adopted rules that would have barred him from running in the Republican primary. Anesthesiologist Ray Callas ran in the Republican primary to replace him, winning it unopposed. He faced Democrat Jacky Hernandez in the general election, defeating Hernandez by a wide margin.

District 21 general election
Party	Candidate	Votes	%
Republican	Ray Callas		
Democratic	Jacqueline "Jacky" Hernandez		
Total votes			

=== District 22 ===
Incumbent Democrat Christian Manuel was re-elected unopposed.

District 22 general election
Party	Candidate	Votes	%
Democratic	Christian Manuel (incumbent)		
Total votes			

=== District 23 ===
Incumbent Republican Terri Leo-Wilson ran for re-election. Her challenger in the Republican primary, Nathan Watkins, raised more than double Leo-Wilson's campaign funding, primarily from high-dollar donations from industries such as construction. Leo-Wilson accused Watkins of having a conflict of interest regarding his company's relationship with Barbers Hill ISD and plans to construct a luxury apartment complex. Watkins filed a defamation lawsuit against Leo-Wilson for her comments, which she filed a SLAPP motion to dismiss. Watkins also had the backing of billionaire Miriam Adelson, owner of the Las Vegas Sands casino corporation, who targeted Leo-Wilson for her opposition to legalizing casino gambling. Leo-Wilson won the primary and faced Democrat Cheryl Lynn Clark in the general election. Leo-Wilson won re-election with 56% of the vote.

District 23 Republican primary
Party	Candidate	Votes	%
Republican	Terri Leo-Wilson (incumbent)	11,561	62.72%
Republican	Nathan Watkins	6,872	37.28%
Total votes		18,433	100.0%

District 23 Democratic primary
Party	Candidate	Votes	%
Democratic	Cheryl Lynn Clark	7,595	68.09%
Democratic	Sean Foley	3,559	31.91%
Total votes		11,154	100.0%

District 23 general election
Party	Candidate	Votes	%
Republican	Terri Leo-Wilson (incumbent)		
Democratic	Cheryl Lynn Clark		
Total votes			

=== District 24 ===
Incumbent Republican Greg Bonnen was re-elected.

District 24 general election
Party	Candidate	Votes	%
Republican	Greg Bonnen (incumbent)		
Democratic	Frank N. Carr		
Total votes			

=== District 25 ===
Incumbent Republican Cody Vasut ran for re-election. Vasut narrowly defeated Democratic candidate Mike Meadors with a margin of less than 1,200 votes.

District 25 Democratic primary
Party	Candidate	Votes	%
Democratic	Mike Meadors	7,290	56.02%
Democratic	J. Daggett	5,723	43.98%
Total votes		13,013	100.0%

District 25 general election
Party	Candidate	Votes	%
Republican	Cody Vasut (incumbent)		
Democratic	Mike Meadors		
Total votes			

=== District 26 ===
Incumbent Republican Matt Morgan ran for re-election. Democrat Eliz Markowitz, a professor at the University of Houston, challenged Morgan in the suburban Fort Bend County district. Morgan won the race by a narrow margin of less than 200 votes.

District 26 Democratic primary
Party	Candidate	Votes	%
Democratic	Elizabeth "Eliz" Markowitz	6,777	56.93%
Democratic	Daniel Lee	5,128	43.07%
Total votes		11,905	100.0%

District 26 general election
Party	Candidate	Votes	%
Republican	Matt Morgan (incumbent)		
Democratic	Elizabeth "Eliz" Markowitz		
Total votes			

=== District 27 ===
Incumbent Democrat Ron Reynolds was re-elected.

District 27 Democratic primary
Party	Candidate	Votes	%
Democratic	Ron Reynolds (incumbent)	24,244	87.52%
Democratic	Paul Prevot	3,458	12.48%
Total votes		27,702	100.0%

District 27 general election
Party	Candidate	Votes	%
Democratic	Ron Reynolds (incumbent)		
Republican	Max Alalibo		
Total votes			

=== District 28 ===
Incumbent Republican Gary Gates ran for re-election. In the general election he narrowly lost to the Democratic candidate Sandy Ibáñez, a public school teacher.

District 28 Democratic primary
Party	Candidate	Votes	%
Democratic	Sandy Ibáñez	7,500	53.49%
Democratic	Kristyna Payton Loundy	6,522	46.51%
Total votes		14,022	100.0%

District 28 general election
Party	Candidate	Votes	%
Republican	Gary Gates (incumbent)		
Democratic	Sandy Ibáñez		
Total votes			

=== District 29 ===
Incumbent Republican Jeff Barry was re-elected. In the general election, he narrowly defeated Democratic candidate Karen Reeder with a margin of less than 1300 votes.

District 29 general election
Party	Candidate	Votes	%
Republican	Jeff Barry (incumbent)		
Democratic	Karen Reeder		
Total votes			

=== District 30 ===
Incumbent Republican AJ Louderback ran for re-election. In the general election he won against Democrat Crystal Sedillo by a wide margin.

District 30 Democratic primary
Party	Candidate	Votes	%
Democratic	Crystal Sedillo	4,433	69.73%
Democratic	David Steves	1,924	30.27%
Total votes		6,357	100.0%

District 30 general election
Party	Candidate	Votes	%
Republican	AJ Louderback (incumbent)		
Democratic	Crystal Sedillo		
Total votes			

=== District 31 ===
Incumbent Republican Ryan Guillen ran for re-election. Guillen, a former Democrat and one of the most moderate members of the House, was expected to easily win re-election in the heavily Republican district encompassing much of the rural parts of the Rio Grande Valley. He used his resources to aid other Republican incumbents in the region. In the November election, he defeated Democrat Jennifer Dominguez.

District 31 general election
Party	Candidate	Votes	%
Republican	Ryan Guillen (incumbent)		
Democratic	Jennifer "JJ" Dominguez		
Total votes			

=== District 32 ===
Incumbent Republican Todd Hunter won re-election.

District 32 general election
Party	Candidate	Votes	%
Republican	Todd Hunter (incumbent)		
Democratic	Gabriel Lazano Marroquin		
Total votes			

=== District 33 ===
Incumbent Republican Katrina Pierson ran for re-election. She faced a challenger in the Rockwall County district from Democrat Orlando Lopez, who has campaigned against Pierson's support of Texas's school voucher program. Peirson won with just over 55% of the vote.

District 33 general election
Party	Candidate	Votes	%
Republican	Katrina Pierson (incumbent)		
Democratic	Orlando Lopez		
Total votes			

=== District 34 ===
Incumbent Republican Denise Villalobos ran for re-election. She faced Democrat Stephanie Guerrero Sáenz Villalobos flipped District 34, which is based in Corpus Christi, in 2024. It was one of five Republican-held seats Democrats most heavily targeting in the general election. Throughout 2026, Corpus Christi struggled with its drinking water supply due to overuse, particularly from industrial refineries, becoming a defining feature of the campaign. Villalobos highlighted her work in the legislature to secure funding for water-related projects, while both candidates laid out plans to address the looming crisis. On election day, Sáenz won with over 55% of the vote, flipping the seat back to Democratic control.

District 34 general election
Party	Candidate	Votes	%
Republican	Denise Villalobos (incumbent)		
Democratic	Stephanie Guerrero Sáenz		
Total votes			

=== District 35 ===
Incumbent Democrat Oscar Longoria ran for re-election. Donald Trump won Longoria's district by seven percentage points in the 2024 presidential election. Longoria defeated his opponent Republican Oscar Rosa by a wide margin.

District 35 general election
Party	Candidate	Votes	%
Democratic	Oscar Longoria (incumbent)		
Republican	Oscar Rosa		
Total votes			

=== District 36 ===
Incumbent Democrat Sergio Muñoz was re-elected unopposed, despite Donald Trump having won his district by six percentage points in the 2024 presidential election.

District 36 general election
Party	Candidate	Votes	%
Democratic	Sergio Muñoz (incumbent)		
Total votes			

=== District 37 ===
Incumbent Republican Janie Lopez ran for re-election. Lopez flipped District 37, which is located in the Rio Grande Valley, in 2022, and was one of five Republican-held seats Democrats most heavily targeted in the general election. Lopez faced Democratic candidate Oziel Ochoa, a Director of Special Education, in the general election. Ochoa won the contested Democratic primary in a runoff while campaigning strongly against the state's school voucher program. On election day Ochoa beat Lopez, winning approximately 58% of the vote.

District 37 Republican primary
Party	Candidate	Votes	%
Republican	Janie Lopez (incumbent)	6,057	68.95%
Republican	Kristin Luckey	2,727	31.05%
Total votes		8,784	100.0%

District 37 Democratic primary
Party	Candidate	Votes	%
Democratic	Oziel Ochoa	6,526	46.22%
Democratic	Esmeralda "Esmi" Cantu-Castle	4,532	32.10%
Democratic	Stephany Bauer	3,062	21.69%
Total votes		14,120	100.0%

District 37 Democratic primary runoff
Party	Candidate	Votes	%
Democratic	Oziel Ochoa	4,031	61.59%
Democratic	Esmeralda "Esmi" Cantu-Castle	2,514	38.41%
Total votes		6,545	100.0%

District 37 general election
Party	Candidate	Votes	%
Republican	Janie Lopez (incumbent)		
Democratic	Oziel Ochoa		
Total votes			

=== District 38 ===
Incumbent Democrat Erin Gamez ran for re-election. Gamez did not participate in the quorum bust undertaken by most other House Democrats to stall the passage of new a congressional map for the 2026 midterm elections, although she still opposed the redistricting effort. Donald Trump narrowly won Gamez's district in the 2024 presidential election. On election day she defeated her Republican opponent Laura Cisneros winning over 75% of the vote.

District 38 general election
Party	Candidate	Votes	%
Democratic	Erin Gamez (incumbent)		
Republican	Laura E. Cisneros		
Total votes			

=== District 39 ===
Incumbent Democrat Armando Martinez was re-elected unopposed, despite Donald Trump having won his district by two percentage points in the 2024 presidential election.

District 39 general election
Party	Candidate	Votes	%
Democratic	Armando Martinez (incumbent)		
Total votes			

=== District 40 ===
Incumbent Democrat Terry Canales ran for re-election. Canales did not participate in the quorum bust undertaken by most other House Democrats to stall the passage of new a congressional map for the 2026 midterm elections, although he still opposed the redistricting effort. He faced Republican nominee Celeste Cabrera-Huff in the general election. Donald Trump narrowly won Canales' district in the 2024 presidential election. On election day Canales was re-elected winning nearly 75% of the popular vote.

District 40 Republican primary
Party	Candidate	Votes	%
Republican	Celeste Cabrera-Huff	1,212	38.14%
Republican	Nehemias "Memo" Gomez	1,184	37.26%
Republican	Vangela Churchill	782	24.61%
Total votes		3,178	100.0%

District 40 Republican primary runoff
Party	Candidate	Votes	%
Republican	Celeste Cabrera-Huff	822	68.79%
Republican	Nehemias 'Memo' Gomez	373	31.21%
Total votes		1,195	100.0%

District 40 general election
Party	Candidate	Votes	%
Democratic	Terry Canales (incumbent)		
Republican	Celeste Cabrera-Huff		
Total votes			

=== District 41 ===
Incumbent Democrat Robert Guerra chose to retire. Donald Trump won the McAllen-based district in the 2024 presidential election, making the seat a top target for Republicans in the general election. Due to this vulnerability, the seat received extra attention and funding from the Democratic Legislative Campaign Committee to prevent it from flipping. Both primaries were hotly-contested and proceeded to runoff elections as candidates accused each other of having affiliated with the opposing party based on past primary voting records, with conflict on the Republican side focusing on the state's abortion laws and gun rights.

The Democratic runoff became a flashpoint in the broader national battle between moderates and progressives. Former legislative staffer Julio Salinas received the backing of progressive U.S. Senator Bernie Sanders and state representative Christina Morales, whom he previously worked for. He campaigned heavily on rolling back the state's school voucher program. Seby Haddad, on the other hand, had the backing of most of the region's incumbent Democratic legislators. During the first round of the primary, both Salinas and Eric Holguín accused Haddad of being too moderate, as he had voted in Republican primaries for a decade and had voted for several downballot Republicans over the years. Despite these attacks, however, Holguín endorsed Haddad in the runoff against Salinas. Both painted him as too inexperienced and ideological for the district, and some Democrats worried he would have trouble winning the general election in the moderate district. Salinas won the runoff to advance to the general election. Gary Groves won the Republican runoff.

Salinas and Groves participated in a debate on October 14, presenting drastically different agendas while agreeing on the need to improve affordability. Groves proposed reducing and eventually eliminating residential property taxes, particularly school district property taxes, while Salinas pushed for Medicaid expansion and the capping of prescription drug prices. The two also sharply disagreed on issues such as school vouchers, AI data centers, and public transportation. On election day, Salinas won with 68% of the vote and will be the youngest member of the Texas House of Representatives.

District 41 Democratic primary
Party	Candidate	Votes	%
Democratic	Julio Salinas	6,023	38.61%
Democratic	Victor "Seby" Haddad	5,816	37.28%
Democratic	Eric Holguín	3,761	24.11%
Total votes		15,600	100.0%

District 41 Democratic primary runoff
Party	Candidate	Votes	%
Democratic	Julio Salinas	3,365	55.53%
Democratic	Victor "Seby" Haddad	2,695	44.47%
Total votes		6,060	100.0%

District 41 Republican primary
Party	Candidate	Votes	%
Republican	Sergio Sanchez	2,843	45.68%
Republican	Gary Groves	2,394	38.46%
Republican	Sarah Sagredo-Hammond	987	15.86%
Total votes		6,224	100.0%

District 41 Republican primary runoff
Party	Candidate	Votes	%
Republican	Gary Groves	2,392	62.65%
Republican	Sergio Sanchez	1,426	37.35%
Total votes		3,818	100.0%

District 41 general election
Party	Candidate	Votes	%
Democratic	Julio Salinas		
Republican	Gary Groves		
Total votes			

=== District 42 ===
Incumbent Democrat Richard Raymond ran for re-election. Donald Trump narrowly won Raymond's district in the 2024 presidential election. He defeated Republican Teresa Johnson-Hernandez by a wide margin.

District 42 general election
Party	Candidate	Votes	%
Democratic	Richard Raymond (incumbent)		
Republican	Teresa Johnson-Hernandez		
Total votes			

=== District 43 ===
Incumbent Republican José Manuel Lozano was re-elected.

District 43 general election
Party	Candidate	Votes	%
Republican	José Manuel Lozano (incumbent)		
Democratic	Jeffrey T. Jackson		
Total votes			

=== District 44 ===
Incumbent Republican Alan Schoolcraft was re-elected, defeating Democrat Eric Norman.

District 44 Republican primary
Party	Candidate	Votes	%
Republican	Alan Schoolcraft (incumbent)	15,500	80.27%
Republican	Gabriel Ortiz	3,810	19.73%
Total votes		19,310	100.0%

District 44 Democratic primary
Party	Candidate	Votes	%
Democratic	Eric Norman	7,888	62.51%
Democratic	Steve Schwab	4,730	37.49%
Total votes		12,618	100.0%

District 43 general election
Party	Candidate	Votes	%
Republican	Alan Schoolcraft (incumbent)		
Democratic	Eric Norman		
Total votes			

=== District 45 ===
Incumbent Democrat Erin Zwiener ran for re-election. The election was a rematch against Republican Tennyson Moreno, whom she defeated in 2024. Strategies to manage the rapid population growth of Hays County, where the district is based, emerged as a key campaign issue alongside the usual policy disagreements between the two parties. Zwiener received the endorsement of the Austin American-Statesman. On election day, Zweiner beat Moreno again winning approximately 68% of the vote.

District 45 general election
Party	Candidate	Votes	%
Democratic	Erin Zwiener (incumbent)		
Republican	Tennyson G. Moreno		
Total votes			

=== District 46 ===
Incumbent Democrat Sheryl Cole was re-elected unopposed.

District 46 general election
Party	Candidate	Votes	%
Democratic	Sheryl Cole (incumbent)		
Total votes			

=== District 47 ===
Incumbent Democrat Vikki Goodwin retired to run for Lieutenant Governor. Pooja Sethi, Goodwin's former chief of staff, defeated Joseph Kopser, who had previously ran for Texas's 21st congressional district in 2018, in the Democratic primary. She faced Republican Jennifer Mushtaler in the general election. Both candidates criticized the state's "Robin Hood" recapture program while seeking to improve affordability, with Sethi focusing on medical costs and repealing the state's school voucher program while Mushtaler proposed property tax relief for homeowners. Sethi received the endorsement of the Austin American-Statesman. Sethi won the election by a wide margin.

District 47 Democratic primary
Party	Candidate	Votes	%
Democratic	Pooja Sethi	21,157	76.08%
Democratic	Joseph Kopser	6,653	23.92%
Total votes		27,810	100.0%

District 47 general election
Party	Candidate	Votes	%
Democratic	Pooja Sethi		
Republican	Jennifer Mushtaler		
Total votes			

=== District 48 ===
Incumbent Democrat Donna Howard won re-election with over 75% of the popular vote.

District 48 general election
Party	Candidate	Votes	%
Democratic	Donna Howard (incumbent)		
Republican	Anthony Gupta		
Total votes			

=== District 49 ===
Incumbent Democrat Gina Hinojosa retired to run for Governor. A very crowded Democratic primary emerged to replace her in the liberal, Austin-based district. Among the candidates is Kathie Tovo, a former member of the Austin City Council. Montserrat Garibay, a former U.S. Department of Education official, received the endorsement of several prominent Democratic politicians, including U.S. Representative Greg Casar, state representative John Bucy, and former state senator Wendy Davis. All of the Democratic candidates expressed similar policy positions, differentiating themselves on experience and focus. With none of the candidates receiving a majority of the vote, Garibay and Tovo proceeded to a runoff election, which Garibay won.

Arshia Papari, an undergraduate student at the University of Texas at Austin, ran with the Green Party. Papari had formerly affiliated with the Democratic party, until he became disillusioned with the party over its response to the Gaza War. Papari focused his campaign on protecting student speech, campaign finance reform, and universal childcare. Garibay overwhelmingly out-raised Papari. The 49th district is the most Democratic-leaning district in the state, having voted for Kamala Harris by 60 percentage points in the 2024 presidential election. On election day, Garibay won receiving nearly 90% of the vote.

District 49 Democratic primary
Party	Candidate	Votes	%
Democratic	Montserrat Garibay	13,349	32.92%
Democratic	Kathie Tovo	11,448	28.23%
Democratic	Josh Reyna	3,586	8.84%
Democratic	Robin Jennifer Lerner	3,079	7.59%
Democratic	Gigs Hodges	2,855	7.04%
Democratic	Shenghao "Daniel" Wang	2,760	6.81%
Democratic	Kimmie Ellison	2,419	5.97%
Democratic	Sam Slade	1,057	2.61%
Total votes		40,553	100.0%

District 49 Democratic primary runoff
Party	Candidate	Votes	%
Democratic	Montserrat Garibay	9,897	62.24%
Democratic	Kathie Tovo	6,005	37.76%
Total votes		15,902	100.0%

District 49 general election
Party	Candidate	Votes	%
Democratic	Montserrat Garibay		
Green	Arshia Papari		
Total votes			

=== District 50 ===
Incumbent Democrat James Talarico retired to run for US Senate. A crowded primary emerged to replace him including Jeremy Hendricks, a labor organizer, who received the endorsement of several Austin-area Democrats, including U.S. Representative Lloyd Doggett, state senator Sarah Eckhardt, and mayor Kirk Watson. Other candidates include Samantha Lopez-Resendez, a staffer for state representative Donna Howard and former public school librarian who is running with an emphasis on public education, and Kate Lincoln-Goldfinch, an immigration attorney. Resendez ultimately won the primary and faced Republican Howard Olsen in the general election. Resendez won the general election with over 80% of the popular vote.

District 50 Democratic primary
Party	Candidate	Votes	%
Democratic	Samantha Lopez Resendez	11,351	51.57%
Democratic	Jeremy Hendricks	4,516	20.52%
Democratic	Kate Lincoln-Goldfinch	3,896	17.70%
Democratic	John Hash	902	4.10%
Democratic	Nathan Boynton	889	4.04%
Democratic	William Rannefeld	456	2.07%
Total votes		22,010	100.0%

District 50 general election
Party	Candidate	Votes	%
Democratic	Samantha Lopez Resendez		
Republican	Howard Olsen		
Total votes			

=== District 51 ===
Incumbent Democrat Lulu Flores won re-election with over 85% of the vote.

District 51 general election
Party	Candidate	Votes	%
Democratic	Lulu Flores (incumbent)		
Republican	Jessica Martinez		
Total votes			

=== District 52 ===
Incumbent Republican Caroline Harris Davila ran for re-election. Her challenger in the Republican primary, Blayre Peña, focused her campaign on property tax legislation Harris Davila voted on during the previous legislation, criticizing it as shifting the tax burden from large businesses to small businesses and homeowners, receiving the endorsement of the Austin American-Statesman as a result. Harris Davilla won the primary and faced Democrat Chris Jimenez in the general election. Harris Davila's seat was one of seven added to national Democrats' list as a possible target for flipping in June as their confidence grew in potentially flipping the House. Previously held by Democrat James Talarico following the 2018 election, Republicans gerrymandered the Williamson County district to be more favorable for Republicans, although the race was still considered competitive. Jimenez focused his campaign on Harris Davila's support for school vouchers and a vetoed THC ban. He also received the endorsement of the Austin American-Statesman. Harris Davila focused on her record of voting to lower taxes, as well as voting for changes to the state's education system, both in academics and athletics. Jimenez beat Harris Davila flipping the seat back to Democratic control.

District 52 Republican primary
Party	Candidate	Votes	%
Republican	Caroline Harris Davila (incumbent)	15,483	86.84%
Republican	Blayre Peña	2,347	13.16%
Total votes		17,830	100.0%

District 52 general election
Party	Candidate	Votes	%
Republican	Caroline Harris Davila (incumbent)		
Democratic	Chris Jimenez		
Total votes			

=== District 53 ===
Incumbent Republican Wes Virdell ran for re-election. District 53 covers much of Texas Hill Country, which was hit by deadly flooding in 2025. Virdell opposed legislation passed by the legislature during a subsequent special legislative session that increased regulations on summer camps in the region, arguing the burden imposed would force many of those camps to close. Virdell was re-elected winning over 70% of the popular vote.

District 53 general election
Party	Candidate	Votes	%
Republican	Wes Virdell (incumbent)		
Democratic	Kathryn Hartmann		
Total votes			

=== District 54 ===
Incumbent Republican Brad Buckley ran for re-election. Democratic challenger Dawn Richardson campaigned against AI data centers and for increasing public school funding. Buckley touted his record on public safety and disabled veteran's property tax exemptions, a key issue in the Bell County district, which contains Fort Hood. On election day, Buckley was re-elected.

District 54 general election
Party	Candidate	Votes	%
Republican	Brad Buckley (incumbent)		
Democratic	Dawn Richardson		
Total votes			

=== District 55 ===
Incumbent Republican Hillary Hickland ran for re-election. In the general election she faced Democrat Amelia Rabroker, an art studio owner from Harker Heights. Rabroker narrowly flipped the seat, defeating Hickland by less than 500 votes.

District 55 general election
Party	Candidate	Votes	%
Republican	Hillary Hickland (incumbent)		
Democratic	Amelia Rabroker		
Total votes			

=== District 56 ===
Incumbent Republican Pat Curry won re-election.

District 56 Republican primary
Party	Candidate	Votes	%
Republican	Pat Curry (incumbent)	14,001	69.03%
Republican	Ralph Patterson	6,281	30.97%
Total votes		20,282	100.0%

District 56 Democratic primary
Party	Candidate	Votes	%
Democratic	Ashley Bean Thornton	5,966	55.92%
Democratic	Janessa Givens	4,703	44.08%
Total votes		10,669	100.0%

District 56 general election
Party	Candidate	Votes	%
Republican	Pat Curry (incumbent)		
Democratic	Ashley Bean Thornton		
Total votes			

=== District 57 ===
Incumbent Republican Richard Hayes won re-election.

District 57 general election
Party	Candidate	Votes	%
Republican	Richard Hayes (incumbent)		
Democratic	Ray Stith		
Libertarian	Darren Hamilton		
Total votes			

=== District 58 ===
Incumbent Republican Helen Kerwin was re-elected, winning with nearly 68% of the vote.

District 58 Republican primary
Party	Candidate	Votes	%
Republican	Helen Kerwin (incumbent)	13,847	66.07%
Republican	Mary Louise Wells	7,112	33.93%
Total votes		20,959	100.0%

District 58 general election
Party	Candidate	Votes	%
Republican	Helen Kerwin (incumbent)		
Democratic	Chris Oldham		
Total votes			

=== District 59 ===
Incumbent Republican Shelby Slawson was re-elected, winning nearly 75% of the popular vote.

District 59 Democratic primary
Party	Candidate	Votes	%
Democratic	Andrew Turner	3,528	62.87%
Democratic	Ethan Newcomer	2,084	37.13%
Total votes		5,612	100.0%

District 59 general election
Party	Candidate	Votes	%
Republican	Shelby Slawson (incumbent)		
Democratic	Andrew Turner		
Total votes			

=== District 60 ===
Incumbent Republican Mike Olcott won re-election with over 78% of the vote.

District 60 Republican primary
Party	Candidate	Votes	%
Republican	Mike Olcott (incumbent)	27,080	83.87%
Republican	Amy Fennell	5,208	16.13%
Total votes		32,288	100.0%

District 60 general election
Party	Candidate	Votes	%
Republican	Mike Olcott (incumbent)		
Democratic	Krissy Guess		
Total votes			

=== District 61 ===
Incumbent Republican Keresa Richardson ran for re-election. Frederick Frazier, a former incumbent whom Richardson had beaten in the 2024 Republican primary, challenged her for his old seat. The focus of the 2024 primary had been Frazier's 2023 vote to impeach attorney general Ken Paxton. Richardson won the primary. In the Democratic primary, candidate Brittany Black had previously filed to run for Texas's 3rd congressional district as a Republican before switching to this race as a Democrat, calling the former filing a "mistake." Black defeated Jackie Bescherer in the Democratic primary, who was seen as the more moderate of the two.

Richardson had won nearly 60% of the vote in 2024, but Democrats saw the district as possibly competitive due to backlash against the closures of several local schools, which they blamed on the Republican administration, and the continued population growth of northern Collin County. The seat was one of seven added in June to national Democrats' list as a possible target for flipping, and the county received increased attention due to the high-profile race for U.S. Senate in the state, as Republican nominee Ken Paxton is from there. Texas Scorecard reported over the summer on Black's criminal history, which included a high speed police chase and cocaine possession while living in Illinois. Richardson headlined the Texas Faith Fest, which included the drafting of potential anti-Muslim legislation designed to promote Christianity in its place. Anissa Chilmeran also ran for the seat with the Green Party. On election day the race proved to be very competitive with the race staying too close to call for several days. Initial results showed Richardson winning the race by 7 votes. Black filed for a recount.

District 61 Republican primary
Party	Candidate	Votes	%
Republican	Keresa Richardson (incumbent)	12,518	67.02%
Republican	Frederick Frazier	6,161	32.98%
Total votes		18,679	100.0%

District 61 Democratic primary
Party	Candidate	Votes	%
Democratic	Brittany Black	8,785	56.10%
Democratic	Jackie Bescherer	6,875	43.90%
Total votes		15,660	100.0%

District 61 general election
Party	Candidate	Votes	%
Republican	Keresa Richardson (incumbent)		
Democratic	Brittany Black		
Green	Anissa Chilmeran		
Total votes			

=== District 62 ===
Incumbent Republican Shelley Luther won re-election.

District 62 general election
Party	Candidate	Votes	%
Republican	Shelley Luther (incumbent)		
Democratic	Catherine Thorne		
Total votes			

=== District 63 ===
Incumbent Republican Ben Bumgarner ran for re-election. Denise Wooten, a psychologist and perennial Democrat candidate, also ran. Wooten narrowly defeated Bumgarner, slipping the seat to Democratic control.

District 63 general election
Party	Candidate	Votes	%
Republican	Ben Bumgarner (incumbent)		
Democratic	Denise Wooten		
Total votes			

=== District 64 ===
Incumbent Republican Andy Hopper ran for re-election. Texans for Lawsuit Reform backed a primary challenger, Lisa McEntire, over Hopper's role in watering down and eventually killing a major tort reform bill. McEntire also had the backing of billionaire Miriam Adelson, owner of the Las Vegas Sands casino corporation, due to Hopper's opposition to legalizing casino gambling. Hopper won the primary and faced Democrat Julie Evans in the general election. Hopper beat Evans receiving approximately 55% of the vote.

District 64 Republican primary
Party	Candidate	Votes	%
Republican	Andy Hopper (incumbent)	15,819	70.32%
Republican	Lisa McEntire	6,678	29.68%
Total votes		22,497	100.0%

District 64 Democratic primary
Party	Candidate	Votes	%
Democratic	Julie Evans	7,822	54.33%
Democratic	Christie Wood	6,574	45.67%
Total votes		14,396	100.0%

District 64 general election
Party	Candidate	Votes	%
Republican	Andy Hopper (incumbent)		
Democratic	Julie Evans		
Total votes			

=== District 65 ===
Incumbent Republican Mitch Little ran for re-election. Little faced a rematch against Democrat Detrick DeBurr, whom he defeated in the 2024 election with 60% of the vote. Little again won against DeBurr, but by a narrower margin than the previous race.

District 65 general election
Party	Candidate	Votes	%
Republican	Mitch Little (incumbent)		
Democratic	Detrick DeBurr		
Total votes			

=== District 66 ===
Incumbent Republican Matt Shaheen ran for re-election. During the 2025 legislative session, Shaheen pushed for a bill which would have redirected 25% of Dallas Area Rapid Transit's funding towards more localized transit projects, which critics argued would have gutted the agency. After these efforts failed, he supported Plano, part of which is in his district, in their call for an election to withdraw from the agency. Plano ultimately canceled their withdrawal election, but three other member cities held one, with Highland Park voting to leave. Shaheen received the endorsement of The Dallas Morning News over his challenger, Democrat Sandeep Srivastava. Shaheen was re-elected.

District 66 general election
Party	Candidate	Votes	%
Republican	Matt Shaheen (incumbent)		
Democratic	Sandeep Srivastava		
Total votes			

=== District 67 ===
Incumbent Republican Jeff Leach ran for re-election. This seat was one of seven added in June to national Democrats' list as a possible target for flipping. While considered strongly conservative, Leach had occasionally broken from his party, having led in the impeachment of attorney general Ken Paxton in 2023 and denouncing railroad commission candidate Bo French for a series of racist social media posts direct at Indian American students at the University of Texas, although Leach did endorse Paxton after he became the Republican nominee for U.S. Senate. Leach received the endorsement of The Dallas Morning News against his Democratic opponent, Jordan Wheatley. The race proved highly competitive as the results remained too close to call for serveral days after the election. The final count showed Leach holding onto his seat by just 128 votes as Wheatley decided against a recount.

District 67 Republican primary
Party	Candidate	Votes	%
Republican	Jeff Leach (incumbent)	12,008	64.31%
Republican	Matt Thorsen	6,664	35.39%
Total votes		18,672	100.0%

District 67 Democratic primary
Party	Candidate	Votes	%
Democratic	Jordan Wheatley	8,819	57.43%
Democratic	Emeka Eluka	6,538	42.57%
Total votes		15,357	100.0%

District 67 general election
Party	Candidate	Votes	%
Democratic	Jordan Wheatley		
Republican	Jeff Leach (incumbent)		
Total votes			

=== District 68 ===
Incumbent Republican David Spiller ran for re-election. The 68th district is the most Republican-leaning district in the state, having voted for Donald Trump by over 72 percentage points in the 2024 presidential election. Spiller was re-elected with over 80% of the popular vote.

District 68 general election
Party	Candidate	Votes	%
Republican	David Spiller (incumbent)		
Democratic	Jasmine Henderson		
Total votes			

=== District 69 ===
Incumbent Republican James Frank ran for re-election. Leilani Barnett, an educator from Wichita Falls, challenged Frank on a platform of Medicaid expansion, AI data center regulation, and public education funding. Frank ran on his legislative record, lowering property taxes, and securing the state's water supply. On election day, Frank defeated Barnett by a wide margin.

District 69 general election
Party	Candidate	Votes	%
Republican	James Frank (incumbent)		
Democratic	Leilani Barnett		
Total votes			

=== District 70 ===
Incumbent Democrat Mihaela Plesa ran for re-election. A somewhat Democratic-leaning district in Collin County, Plesa received extra support from the Democratic Legislative Campaign Committee to prevent her seat from flipping. Plesa's faced Republican and former judge George Flint in the general election. She has made education policy a focus of her campaign, opposing both school vouchers and the state's "Robin Hood" recapture program, which redistributes property tax revenue away from wealthier school districts, such as those in district 70. Flint campaigned on issues such as supporting law enforcement and eliminating residential property taxes. Plesa received the endorsement of The Dallas Morning News. Pleasa beat Flint receiving 58% of the popular vote.

District 70 Republican primary
Party	Candidate	Votes	%
Republican	George Flint	6,430	56.80%
Republican	Michael Hewitt	2,534	22.39%
Republican	Jack Ryan Gallagher	2,356	20.81%
Total votes		11,320	100.0%

District 70 general election
Party	Candidate	Votes	%
Democratic	Mihaela Plesa (incumbent)		
Republican	George Flint		
Total votes			

=== District 71 ===
Incumbent Republican Stan Lambert retired. On October 11, 2025, the Texas GOP issued a censure against Lambert, but stopped short of implementing newly adopted rules that would have barred Lambert from running in the Republican primary. Jay Hardaway won the Republican primary to replace him and ran heavily on a platform of regulating AI data centers, lowering property taxes, and supporting public education, while also supporting the state's recently-passed school voucher program. He faced Democrat Diana Luna in the general election in the Abilene-anchored district. Hardaway won with over 70% of the vote.

District 71 Republican primary
Party	Candidate	Votes	%
Republican	Jay Hardaway	12,685	56.52%
Republican	Chance Ferguson	4,857	21.64%
Republican	Liz Case	4,187	18.66%
Republican	Joshua Ohlemacher	714	3.18%
Total votes		22,443	100.0%

District 71 general election
Party	Candidate	Votes	%
Republican	Jay Hardaway		
Democratic	Diana Luna		
Total votes			

=== District 72 ===
Incumbent Republican Drew Darby ran for re-election in the San Angelo-anchored 72nd district. Darby, who chairs the House Energy Resources Committee, publicly berated Wayne Christian, a member of the Texas Railroad Commission over his absence at a committee meeting following Christian's vote to eliminate public comment periods at commission meetings, even suggesting that the legislature could abolish the commission entirely. Darby campaigned on increasing funding for public education, lowering property taxes, expanding grants for rural hospitals, and regulating AI data centers. Darby faced Democrat Shiloh Salazar in the general election, who also campaigned on public education, and healthcare, but additionally on Medicaid expansion and limiting aquifer use by high-consumption industries. Darby won re-election with over 70% of the vote.

District 72 general election
Party	Candidate	Votes	%
Republican	Drew Darby (incumbent)		
Democratic	Shiloh Salazar		
Total votes			

=== District 73 ===
Incumbent Republican Carrie Isaac ran for re-election. Isaac is considered solidly conservative and faced Democrat Merrie Fox in the general election. Neither candidate received the endorsement of the Austin-American Statesman. Issac has emphasized culture war issues during her campaign, refusing to debate Fox. Isaac defeated Fox by a wide margin.

District 73 general election
Party	Candidate	Votes	%
Republican	Carrie Isaac (incumbent)		
Democratic	Merrie Fox		
Total votes			

=== District 74 ===
Incumbent Democrat Eddie Morales ran for re-election. The Republican primary was a repeat of the 2024 primary with the candidates, Robert Garza, former Mayor of Del Rio, and John McLeon, a member of the Texas Army National Guard. Garza won the Republican nomination for a second time and faced Morales in the general election. The seat voted heavily for Donald Trump in the 2024 election, making it a top target for Republicans. The Democratic Legislative Campaign Committee provided extra support to prevent this district from flipping.

District 74 is the largest district in the state, stretching from El Paso County to Maverick County, encompassing much of the Texas-Mexico border along the Rio Grande. As such, border security and Donald Trump's immigration policies emerged as major issues in the campaign, with Morales criticizing Trump's policies and Operation Lone Star, a state effort to bolster immigration enforcement, calling them "not sustainable" and "political theater". Morales did not participate in the quorum bust undertaken by most other House Democrats to stall the passage of new a congressional map for the 2026 midterm elections, although he still opposed the redistricting effort. Morales was re-elected by a wide margin.

District 74 Republican primary
Party	Candidate	Votes	%
Republican	Robert Garza	3,522	51.07%
Republican	John McLeon	3,375	48.93%
Total votes		6,897	100.0%

District 74 general election
Party	Candidate	Votes	%
Democratic	Eddie Morales (incumbent)		
Republican	Robert Garza		
Total votes			

=== District 75 ===
Incumbent Democrat Mary González won re-election unopposed.

District 75 general election
Party	Candidate	Votes	%
Democratic	Mary González (incumbent)		
Total votes			

=== District 76 ===
Incumbent Democrat Suleman Lalani ran for re-election. Lalani, a physician, was one of the first two Muslim Americans elected to the Texas Legislature in 2022 amidst a state Republican Party that has increasingly tapped into anti-Muslim sentiment in its campaigns and legislation. He defeated Republican Linda Howell in the general election.

District 76 Democratic primary
Party	Candidate	Votes	%
Democratic	Suleman Lalani (incumbent)	8,517	54.09%
Democratic	Marie Asher Baptiste	7,228	45.91%
Total votes		15,745	100.0%

District 76 Republican primary
Party	Candidate	Votes	%
Republican	Linda Howell	5,192	66.70%
Republican	Christian Amuta	1,424	18.29%
Republican	Lea C.S. Simmons	1,168	15.00%
Total votes		7,784	100.0%

=== District 77 ===
Incumbent Democrat Vincent Perez ran for re-election. He faced plumber Humberto Perez, a former Democrat who previously campaigned for Adriano Espaillat in 2012 but later became a Republican. Perez campaigned strongly against school vouchers, AI data centers, and state tax exemptions that push costs onto local governments, while Perez offered more muted opposition on those issues. Perez won the election with nearly 80% of the vote.

District 77 general election
Party	Candidate	Votes	%
Democratic	Vincent Perez (incumbent)		
Republican	Humberto Perez		
Total votes			

=== District 78 ===
Incumbent Democrat Joe Moody won re-election unopposed.

District 78 general election
Party	Candidate	Votes	%
Democratic	Joe Moody (incumbent)		
Total votes			100.0

=== District 79 ===
Incumbent Democrat Claudia Ordaz ran for re-election. She campaigned strongly against school vouchers while pushing for legislation to improve fertility care, childcare, and animal rights. She faced Republican Jesus Romero in the general election, who campaigned on improving El Paso's tourism industry and criticized non-academic public school expenditures. Ordaz was re-elected with over 705 of the popular vote.

District 79 general election
Party	Candidate	Votes	%
Democratic	Claudia Ordaz (incumbent)		
Republican	Jesus Romero		
Total votes			

=== District 80 ===
Incumbent Republican Don McLaughlin ran for re-election. He faced Democrat Cecilia Castellano in a rematch of the 2024 election, where he flipped the district with nearly 60 percent of the vote. Castellano won the election, flipping the seat back to Democratic control.

District 80 Democratic primary
Party	Candidate	Votes	%
Democratic	Cecilia Castellano	10,383	76.72%
Democratic	Julie Hilberg	3,151	23.28%
Total votes		13,534	100.0%

District 80 general election
Party	Candidate	Votes	%
Republican	Don McLaughlin (incumbent)		
Democratic	Cecilia Castellano		
Total votes			

=== District 81 ===
Incumbent Republican Brooks Landgraf ran for re-election in the Odessa-based district, located in the Permian Basin. Landgraf expressed support for conversations regarding Texas annexing counties in southeastern New Mexico to unify the region under one state government and harmonize regulations surrounding produced water and fracking involved with oil extraction. langraf was reelected by a wide margin.

District 81 general election
Party	Candidate	Votes	%
Republican	Brooks Landgraf (incumbent)		
Democratic	Ceasar Sanchez		
Total votes			

=== District 82 ===
Incumbent Republican Tom Craddick ran for re-election for a 30th term. He is the longest-serving incumbent legislator in the United States, having first been elected to represent Midland in 1968, and served as Speaker of the House from 2003 until 2009, having been instrumental in the Republican takeover of the chamber in 2002. He campaigned on his long legislative record, including funding he appropriated for rural hospitals in the region, while Cathy Broadrick, his Democratic opponent, campaigned in opposition to school vouchers and on improving the region's transportation infrastructure. Craddick was re-elected by a wide margin.

District 82 general election
Party	Candidate	Votes	%
Republican	Tom Craddick (incumbent)		
Democratic	Cathy Broadrick		
Total votes			

=== District 83 ===
Incumbent Republican Speaker of the House Dustin Burrows ran for re-election for District 83, based in Lubbock and the rural areas to the south and east of it. He spent much of the campaign across the state supporting other Republican candidates in competitive districts in an effort to maintain his speakership and the Republican majority in the chamber. He defeated Democrat Malik Williams in the general election.

District 83 general election
Party	Candidate	Votes	%
Republican	Dustin Burrows (incumbent)		
Democratic	Malik Williams		
Total votes			

=== District 84 ===
Incumbent Republican Carl Tepper is ran for re-election for District 84, encompassing western Lubbock County. Tepper openly suggested that Texas should purchase multiple counties in southeastern New Mexico from the state, particularly conservative, oil-producing ones. Democrat Maggie Durham challenged him in the general election, running on a platform primarily focused on public education. Tepper won re-election.

District 84 general election
Party	Candidate	Votes	%
Republican	Carl Tepper (incumbent)		
Democratic	Maggie Durham		
Total votes			

=== District 85 ===
Incumbent Republican Stan Kitzman ran for re-election, but he was defeated in the Republican primary by Dennis Geesaman, the former mayor of Flatonia, who was backed by billionaire Tim Dunn. Geesaman faced Democrat Lawrence Brandyburg in the general election. Geesaman won the election by a wide margin.

District 85 Republican primary
Party	Candidate	Votes	%
Republican	Dennis "Goose" Geesaman	15,165	57.41%
Republican	Stan Kitzman (incumbent)	11,252	42.59%
Total votes		26,417	100.0%

District 85 Democratic primary
Party	Candidate	Votes	%
Democratic	Lawrence Brandyburg	5,169	57.43%
Democratic	Aaron Westerfield	3,832	42.57%
Total votes		9,001	100.0%

District 85 general election
Party	Candidate	Votes	%
Republican	Dennis "Goose" Geesaman		
Democratic	Lawrence Brandyburg		
Total votes			

=== District 86 ===
Incumbent Republican John T. Smithee chose to retire. Holly Jeffreys and Jamies Haynes competed in the Republican primary to succeed him, with Jeffreys receiving the endorsement of both Smithee and The Amarillo Pioneer. Haynes had previously run against Smithee in 2024. Jeffreys won the primary and faced Democrat Cullin Knutson in the general election. Jeffreys won the election with over 75% of the vote.

District 86 Republican primary
Party	Candidate	Votes	%
Republican	Holly Jeffreys	15,579	65.83%
Republican	Jamie Haynes	8,087	34.17%
Total votes		23,666	100.0%

District 86 general election
Party	Candidate	Votes	%
Republican	Holly Jeffreys		
Democratic	Cullin Knutson		
Total votes			

=== District 87 ===
Incumbent Republican Caroline Fairly won re-election with 70% of the vote.

District 87 general election
Party	Candidate	Votes	%
Republican	Caroline Fairly (incumbent)		
Democratic	Diana Loya		
Total votes			

=== District 88 ===
Incumbent Republican Ken King ran for re-election. King defeated challenger John Browning in the Republican primary, who had been backed by billionaire Tim Dunn as the more hardline conservative candidate. He faced teacher Heather Wallace in the general election, who is running on school safety and AI data center regulation. The 88th district is the second most Republican-leaning district in the state, having voted for Donald Trump by over 70 percentage points in the 2024 presidential election. King was re-elected with 78% of the popular vote.

District 88 Republican primary
Party	Candidate	Votes	%
Republican	Ken King (incumbent)	12,168	53.42%
Republican	John Browning	10,609	46.58%
Total votes		22,777	100.0%

District 88 general election
Party	Candidate	Votes	%
Republican	Ken King (incumbent)		
Democratic	Heather J. Wallace		
Total votes			

=== District 89 ===
Incumbent Republican Candy Noble ran for re-election. She faced Jeff Forrester in the Republican primary, who challenged her for not being conservative enough and for supporting the impeachment of attorney general Ken Paxton. Noble defeated Forrester in the primary and faced Democrat Angie Carraway in the general election, who ran on a platform of raising the minimum wage and repealing school vouchers. Carraway narrowly upset Noble flipping the seat to Democratic control.

District 89 Republican primary
Party	Candidate	Votes	%
Republican	Candy Noble (incumbent)	10,544	52.76%
Republican	Jeff Forrester	8,074	40.40%
Republican	Freddie America	1,365	6.83%
Total votes		19,983	100.0%

District 89 general election
Party	Candidate	Votes	%
Republican	Candy Noble (incumbent)		
Democratic	Angie Carraway		
Total votes			

=== District 90 ===
Incumbent Democrat Ramon Romero Jr. was re-elected unopposed.

District 90 general election
Party	Candidate	Votes	%
Democratic	Ramon Romero Jr. (incumbent)		
Total votes			

=== District 91 ===
Incumbent Republican David Lowe ran for re-election. Lowe, an opponent of legalizing casino gambling, defeated Kyle Morris in the Republican primary, who had been backed by billionaire Miriam Adelson, owner of the Las Vegas Sands casino corporation. He faced Yisak Worku, a political newcomer, in the general election. Lowe was re-elected.

District 91 Republican primary
Party	Candidate	Votes	%
Republican	David Lowe (incumbent)	9,693	63.92%
Republican	Kyle Morris	5,471	36.08%
Total votes		15,164	100.0%

District 91 general election
Party	Candidate	Votes	%
Republican	David Lowe (incumbent)		
Democratic	Yisak Worku		
Total votes			

=== District 92 ===
Incumbent Democrat Salman Bhojani ran for re-election. One of only two Muslims in the Texas Legislature, Bohani has called out a perceived rise in Islamaphobia among Texas Republicans, particularly regarding the exclusion of Muslim private schools from the state's school voucher program, pushes from the state government to cancel locally-sponsored Islamic holiday celebrations, and new curriculum guidelines from the Texas Board of Education seen as denigrating to the religion. He faced Republican J.P. Woodruff, the founder of a Christian group called "Remnant Revival", in the general election. Bhojani won re-election by a wide margin.

District 92 Republican primary
Party	Candidate	Votes	%
Republican	J.P. Woodruff	3,808	67.08%
Republican	Joseph A. Robinson	1,869	32.92%
Total votes		5,677	100.0%

District 92 general election
Party	Candidate	Votes	%
Democratic	Salman Bhojani (incumbent)		
Republican	J.P. Woodruff		
Total votes			

=== District 93 ===
Incumbent Republican Nate Schatzline did not run for re-election. A hardline conservative and ardent election denier, Schatzline resigned his seat in July after being appointed as a senior advisor on election policy for governor Greg Abbott. Alan Blaylock, a member of the Fort Worth City Council, won the Republican primary to succeed him. Due to Schatzline's early resignation, a special election was also held concurrently with the general election to fill the remainder of his term. Ericka Lomick, Blaylock's Democratic opponent, suspended her campaign for both elections in September due to concerns about her eligibility to serve after court records revealed past criminal convictions in North Carolina. Despite this, Lomick won both the special and general election, anyway, forcing a full determination on her eligibility. If she is determined to be ineligible, the seat will be considered vacant, and a special election will be held to fill it. Blaylock challenged Lomick's eligibility in court and the certification of the results has been delayed pending the decision.

District 93 Republican primary
Party	Candidate	Votes	%
Republican	Alan Blaylock	12,085	87.43%
Republican	Steve Sprowls	1,738	12.57%
Total votes		13,823	100.0

District 93 special election
Party	Candidate	Votes	%
Republican	Alan Blaylock		
Democratic	Ericka Lomick (withdrawn)		
Total votes			

District 93 general election
Party	Candidate	Votes	%
Republican	Alan Blaylock		
Democratic	Ericka Lomick (withdrawn)		
Total votes			

=== District 94 ===
Incumbent Republican Tony Tinderholt retired to run for Tarrant County Commissioners Court Precinct 2. This seat was one of seven added in June to national Democrats' list as a possible target for flipping. It was also considered the most competitive district in Tarrant County, with half of its territory overlapping the 9th Senate district, where Democrat Taylor Rehmet won an upset victory in the strongly Republican area in a January special election. Both candidates emphasized the need for increased school funding, but they characterized each other as extremists. Bean called O'Brien Duzan a socialist, while Bean has been criticized for a now-deleted social media post which many considered racially offensive. O'Brien Duzan campaigned heavily on Medicaid expansion and repealing school vouchers. O'Brien Duzan narrowly won the race against Bean, flipping the seat to Democratic control.

District 94 Republican primary
Party	Candidate	Votes	%
Republican	Cheryl Bean	8,788	53.76%
Republican	Jackie Schlegel	4,090	25.02%
Republican	Susan Valliant	1,583	9.68%
Republican	Michael Ingraham	1,121	6.86%
Republican	Michael Daughenbaugh	766	4.69%
Total votes		16,348	100.0%

District 94 general election
Party	Candidate	Votes	%
Republican	Cheryl Bean		
Democratic	Katie O'Brien Duzan		
Total votes			

=== District 95 ===
Incumbent Democrat Nicole Collier won re-election unopposed.

District 95 general election
Party	Candidate	Votes	%
Democratic	Nicole Collier (incumbent)		
Total votes			

=== District 96 ===
Incumbent Republican David Cook retired to run for Texas Senate, to replace retiring Senator Brian Birdwell. Democrat Ebony Turner and Republican Ellen Fleischmann were both unopposed in their respective primaries for this seat. Turner ran for this seat in 2024 against Cook, receiving 42% of the vote. Turner campaigned on repealing school vouchers and supported Medicaid expansion and universal health care, while Fleischmann is ran on public safety and deregulation of small businesses, not giving a position on vouchers. Fleischmann outraised Turner throughout the election. The race was considered highly competitive and among several Tarrant County races considered critical for control of the legislature, with Cook's retirement dulling the incumbency advantage that Republicans typically enjoy. Turner narrowly won the election, flipping the seat to Democratic control.

District 96 general election
Party	Candidate	Votes	%
Republican	Ellen Fleischmann		
Democratic	Ebony M. Turner		
Total votes			

=== District 97 ===
Incumbent Republican John McQueeney ran for re-election. He faced Beth Llewellyn McLaughlin, who previously ran for this seat in 2018, in the general election. McQueeney vastly outraised McLaughlin, who campaigned as a progressive on repealing school vouchers and returning local control to school districts. McQueeney ran on border security and reducing property taxes, while also touting the benefits of AI data center construction "if done right". McLaughlin narrowly defeated McQueeny with a margin of less than 1,500 votes.

District 97 Democratic primary
Party	Candidate	Votes	%
Democratic	Diane Symons	7,337	41.51%
Democratic	Beth Llewellyn McLaughlin	5,367	30.36%
Democratic	Ryan Ray	4,971	28.12%
Total votes		17,675	100.0%

District 97 Democratic primary runoff
Party	Candidate	Votes	%
Democratic	Beth Llwellyn McLaughlin	2,323	56.36%
Democratic	Diane Symons	1,799	43.64%
Total votes		4,122	100.0%

District 97 general election
Party	Candidate	Votes	%
Republican	John McQueeney (incumbent)		
Democratic	Beth Llwellyn McLaughlin		
Total votes			

=== District 98 ===
Incumbent Republican Giovanni Capriglione, who had led a Texas House committee based on the Department of Government Efficiency, initially planned to run for re-election but announced his retirement on July 23, 2025. Armin Mizani, the mayor of Keller who had run for this seat in 2018, switched to this race from a special election for Senate District 9, which he had previously been running for. Zee Wilcox, another Republican candidate, had been removed from the ballot over issues with her filing paperwork, but she successfully sued to remain on the ballot. Tort reform became a major issue in the race, with Texans for Lawsuit Reform backing Fred Tate and more conservative legal groups backing Mizani. Mizani won the primary and faced Democrat Cate Brennan in the general election. Mizani won the election with nearly 60% of the popular vote. Following the election, Capriglione announced that he would resign his seat effective November 19, 2026.

District 98 Republican primary
Party	Candidate	Votes	%
Republican	Armin Mizani	13,917	53.12%
Republican	Fred Tate	11,363	43.37%
Republican	Zee Wilcox	918	3.50%
Total votes		26,198	100.0%

District 98 Democratic primary
Party	Candidate	Votes	%
Democratic	Cate Brennan	9,954	78.16%
Democratic	Aaron Hendley	2,782	21.84%
Total votes		12,736	100.0%

District 98 general election
Party	Candidate	Votes	%
Republican	Armin Mizani		
Democratic	Cate Brennan		
Total votes			

=== District 99 ===
Incumbent Republican Charlie Geren ran for re-election. A longtime opponent of school vouchers, Geren voted for them in the 2025 legislative session, saying "the package was going to pass no matter what," in exchange for "safeguards." Michelle Winder, his Democratic opponent, campaigned strongly against his vote on vouchers while also criticizing Republican tax policy as stripping funding from essential services. Geren defeated Winder on election day.

District 99 general election
Party	Candidate	Votes	%
Republican	Charlie Geren (incumbent)		
Democratic	Michelle Winder		
Total votes			

=== District 100 ===
Incumbent Democrat Venton Jones ran for re-election. In a competitive primary, Amanda Richardson narrowly kept him under a majority of the vote, but Jones decisively defeated her in the runoff. Jones, who is openly gay, championed legislation to repeal the state's now-defunct anti-sodomy law, passing it through the House before it died in the Senate. Jones announced his marriage to his partner, Gregory Scott, in September. Jones faced controversy later that month for recognizing singer and songwriter Chris Brown at a concert alongside congresswoman Jasmine Crockett, which he later withdrew following backlash regarding Brown's history of domestic abuse. Jones defeated Republican Jordan Scott Hoffnagle in the general election, receiving over 85% of the popular vote.

District 100 Democratic primary
Party	Candidate	Votes	%
Democratic	Venton Jones (incumbent)	8,071	48.71%
Democratic	Amanda Richardson	5,800	35.00%
Democratic	Justice McFarlane	2,699	16.29%
Total votes		16,570	100.0%

District 100 Democratic primary runoff
Party	Candidate	Votes	%
Democratic	Venton Jones (incumbent)	4,734	83.39%
Democratic	Amanda Richardson	943	16.61%
Total votes		5,677	100.0%

District 100 general election
Party	Candidate	Votes	%
Democratic	Venton Jones (incumbent)		
Republican	Jordan Scott Hoffnagle		
Total votes			

=== District 101 ===
Incumbent Democrat Chris Turner, the former leader of the House Democratic caucus, ran for re-election, but he unexpectedly lost the Democratic primary to Grand Prairie mayor pro tem Junior Enzeonu. Younger and more progressive than Turner, Enzeonu won despite a significant financial disadvantage in what observers called a "generational shift" in the Tarrant County district. While Democratic U.S. Senate candidate Jasmine Crockett did not endorse either candidate in the race, Enzeonu closely tied his campaign to hers. Crockett won three quarters of the vote in District 101 in her highly contested primary against state representative James Talarico, with this surge of turnout contributing to Ezeonu's victory. No Republican or third-party candidate filed to run, so Ezeonu won the general election unopposed.

District 101 Democratic primary
Party	Candidate	Votes	%
Democratic	Junior Ezeonu	11,531	52.64%
Democratic	Chris Turner (incumbent)	10,376	47.36%
Total votes		21,907	100.0%

District 101 general election
Party	Candidate	Votes	%
Democratic	Junior Ezeonu		
Total votes			

=== District 102 ===
Incumbent Democrat Ana-Maria Ramos won re-election by a large margin.

District 102 general election
Party	Candidate	Votes	%
Democratic	Ana-Maria Ramos (incumbent)		
Republican	Bonnie Abadie		
Total votes			

=== District 103 ===
Incumbent Democrat Rafael Anchía won re-election by a wide margin.

District 103 general election
Party	Candidate	Votes	%
Democratic	Rafael Anchía (incumbent)		
Republican	Melanie Medley-Thomas		
Total votes			

=== District 104 ===
Incumbent Democrat Jessica González won re-election unopposed.

District 104 general election
Party	Candidate	Votes	%
Democratic	Jessica González (incumbent)		
Total votes			

=== District 105 ===
Incumbent Democrat Terry Meza was re-elected unopposed.

District 105 general election
Party	Candidate	Votes	%
Democratic	Terry Meza (incumbent)		
Total votes			

=== District 106 ===
Incumbent Republican Jared Patterson ran for re-election. On October 11, 2025, the Texas GOP issued a censure against Patterson, but stopped short of implementing newly adopted rules that would have barred him from running in the Republican primary. Despite the censure, Patterson won the primary and faced Democrat Joe Mayes in the general election. Patterson proposed legislation to delay the start of the school year to September due to summer heat, as well as to raise the penalty for political assassination in response to the killing of conservative activist Charlie Kirk. On election day, Patterson narrowly defeated Mayes.

District 106 Republican primary
Party	Candidate	Votes	%
Republican	Jared Patterson (incumbent)	10,515	53.61%
Republican	Larry Brock	6,685	34.08%
Republican	Rick Abraham	2,415	12.31%
Total votes		19,615	100.0%

District 106 general election
Party	Candidate	Votes	%
Republican	Jared Patterson (incumbent)		
Democratic	Joe Mayes		
Total votes			

=== District 107 ===
Incumbent Democrat Linda Garcia was re-elected unopposed.

District 107 general election
Party	Candidate	Votes	%
Democratic	Linda Garcia (incumbent)		
Total votes			

=== District 108 ===
Incumbent Republican Morgan Meyer ran for re-election. Meyer faced a primary challenge on the right from conservative activist Sanjay Narayan. This seat was one of seven added in June to national Democrats' list as a possible target for flipping. District 108 is based in the Park Cities in Dallas County, one of only two remaining Republican-held seats there. Meyer's Democratic opponent, Allison Mitchell, focused her campaign on public education, particularly opposing Texas's recently-passed school voucher program. Meyer's campaign focused more on public safety and business-friendly legislation. Meyer received the endorsement of The Dallas Morning News. On election day, Meyer defeated Mitchell receiving over 56% of the vote.

District 108 Republican primary
Party	Candidate	Votes	%
Republican	Morgan Meyer (incumbent)	14,446	66.78%
Republican	Sanjay Narayan	7,186	33.22%
Total votes		21,632	100.0%

District 108 general election
Party	Candidate	Votes	%
Republican	Morgan Meyer (incumbent)		
Democratic	Allison Mitchell		
Total votes			

=== District 109 ===
Incumbent Democrat Aicha Davis ran for re-election. Davis pushed back strongly against the proposed establishment of an Immigration and Customs Enforcement detention center in Hutchins both on principle and due to logistical concerns. The proposed center would have had the potential to house nearly as many immigrants as there are residents in Hutchins. Davis defeated Republican Will Campbell with over 80% of the popular vote.

District 109 general election
Party	Candidate	Votes	%
Democratic	Aicha Davis (incumbent)		
Republican	Will Campbell		
Total votes			

=== District 110 ===
Incumbent Democrat Toni Rose won re-election unopposed.

District 110 general election
Party	Candidate	Votes	%
Democratic	Toni Rose (incumbent)		
Total votes			

=== District 111 ===
Incumbent Democrat Yvonne Davis won re-election unopposed.

District 111 general election
Party	Candidate	Votes	%
Democratic	Yvonne Davis (incumbent)		
Total votes			

=== District 112 ===
Incumbent Republican Angie Chen Button ran for re-election. District 112, based in the Far North Dallas suburbs of Richardson and Garland, had become increasingly competitive in recent cycles, although Button had continued to win re-election despite this. It was one of five Republican-held seats Democrats most heavily targeted in the general election. Button won her primary against multiple challengers and faced Democrat Zach Herbert in the general election. Herbert focused his campaign primarily on attacking Button's support of school vouchers, while the two clashed on other economic issues such as taxes and insurance rates. Both supported increasing local control over data center development, though Herbert pushed for more stringent regulations than Button. Button received the endorsement of The Dallas Morning News. On election day, Herbert defeated Button flipping the seat to Democratic control.

District 112 Republican primary
Party	Candidate	Votes	%
Republican	Angie Chen Button (incumbent)	11,750	71.67%
Republican	Chad Carnahan	2,267	13.83%
Republican	Perry E. Baker Sr.	1,550	9.45%
Republican	Tina Price	828	5.05%
Total votes		16,395	100.0%

District 112 general election
Party	Candidate	Votes	%
Republican	Angie Chen Button (incumbent)		
Democratic	Zach Herbert		
Total votes			

=== District 113 ===
Incumbent Democrat Rhetta Bowers was re-elected by a wide margin.

District 113 general election
Party	Candidate	Votes	%
Democratic	Rhetta Bowers (incumbent)		
Republican	Stephen W. Stanley		
Total votes			

=== District 114 ===
Incumbent Democrat John Bryant won re-election by a wide margin.

District 114 general election
Party	Candidate	Votes	%
Democratic	John Bryant (incumbent)		
Republican	Tim McDonough		
Total votes			

=== District 115 ===
Incumbent Democrat Cassandra Hernandez ran for re-election. Hernandez received the endorsement of The Dallas Morning News against Republican challenger Danny Rosellini. Hernandez defeated Republican Danny Rosellini by a wide margin.

District 115 general election
Party	Candidate	Votes	%
Democratic	Cassandra Hernandez (incumbent)		
Republican	Danny Rosellini		
Total votes			

=== District 116 ===
Incumbent Democrat Trey Martinez Fischer ran for re-election despite initially looking into running for Bexar County district attorney. He received the endorsement of the San Antonio Express-News. On election day, he defeated Republican Rhett Rosenquest Smith receiving over 75% of the vote.

District 116 general election
Party	Candidate	Votes	%
Democratic	Trey Martinez Fischer (incumbent)		
Republican	Rhett Rosenquest Smith		
Total votes			

=== District 117 ===
Incumbent Democrat Philip Cortez ran for re-election. Cortez, a moderate Democrat who did not participate in either of the two recent quorum breaks over the 2025 redistricting nor the 2021 voting legislation, drew a progressive primary challenger, Robert Miahara. Cortez won the primary and faced Republican Ben Mostyn in the general election. He also received the endorsement of the San Antonio Express-News. Cortez won re-election by a wide margin.

District 117 Democratic primary
Party	Candidate	Votes	%
Democratic	Philip Cortez (incumbent)	11,491	72.76%
Democratic	Robert Miahara	4,302	27.24%
Total votes		15,793	100.0%

District 117 general election
Party	Candidate	Votes	%
Democratic	Philip Cortez (incumbent)		
Republican	Ben Mostyn		
Total votes			

=== District 118 ===
Incumbent Republican John Lujan retired to run for Texas's 35th congressional district. Lujan had initially won the district in a 2021 special election following the resignation of Democrat Leo Pacheco. Pacheco switched parties in 2025 to run for this seat as a Republican, but he later dropped out. Another Democratic candidate from that race, Desi Martinez, who had also switched parties, remained in the race. Martinez was backed by local Republicans, including Lujan, but she lost the nomination to Jorge Borrego, who played a role in developing the school voucher legislation that passed through the legislature.

District 118, based in southern Bexar County, a perennial swing district, was one of five Republican-held seats Democrats most heavily targeted in the general election due to its narrow Republican lean. Borrego faced Democrat Kristain Carranza, who lost to Lujan in the 2024 election with 48% of the vote, in the general election. Carranza campaigned heavily against school vouchers, while also criticizing social media posts Borrego made as a teenager. Borrego campaigned on issues such as lowering property taxes, lowering crime, and barring transgender girls from women's sports. Carranza out-raised Borrego by a nearly 17–1 margin, and raised more money for her campaign than any other Democratic House candidate in the state. She also received the endorsement of the San Antonio Express-News. Carranza defeated Borrego with over 60% of the vote.

District 118 Republican primary
Party	Candidate	Votes	%
Republican	Jorge Borrego	5,003	52.51%
Republican	Desi Martinez	2,568	26.95%
Republican	Joe Shellhart	1,957	20.54%
Total votes		9,528	100.0%

District 118 general election
Party	Candidate	Votes	%
Republican	Jorge Borrego		
Democratic	Kristian Carranza		
Total votes			

=== District 119 ===
Incumbent Democrat Elizabeth Campos ran for re-election. She faced Republican Melva Perez in the general election, who heavily criticized her participation in a 2025 quorum bust against mid-decade congressional redistricting. Campos received the endorsement of the San Antonio Express-News. Campos won re-election with over 70% of the vote.

District 119 Democratic primary
Party	Candidate	Votes	%
Democratic	Elizabeth Campos (incumbent)	13,130	77.66%
Democratic	Ryan Ayala	3,778	22.34%
Total votes		16,908	100.0%

District 119 general election
Party	Candidate	Votes	%
Democratic	Elizabeth Campos (incumbent)		
Republican	Melva Perez		
Total votes			

=== District 120 ===
Incumbent Democrat Barbara Gervin-Hawkins was re-elected. She defeated two challengers in the Democratic primary and ran unopposed in the general election.

District 120 Democratic primary
Party	Candidate	Votes	%
Democratic	Barbara Gervin-Hawkins (incumbent)	9,360	61.20%
Democratic	Jordan Brown	4,403	28.79%
Democratic	Bently Paiz	1,532	10.02%
Total votes		15,295	100.0%

District 120 general election
Party	Candidate	Votes	%
Democratic	Barbara Gervin-Hawkins (incumbent)		
Total votes			

=== District 121 ===
Incumbent Republican Marc LaHood is running for re-election. LaHood, who won his seat by ousting moderate Republican Steve Allison in 2024 over Allison's opposition to school vouchers, drew his own primary challenger backed by the influential group Texans for Lawsuit Reform. Challenger David McArthur, who worked in the George W. Bush administration, was considered the more moderate, business-centric Republican of the two. LaHood won the race by a wide margin.

District 121, based in the northern suburbs of San Antonio, and its predecessors had not elected a Democrat to the House since 1978. It was one of five Republican-held seats Democrats are most heavily targeting in the general election due to its narrow Republican lean. LaHood faced Democrat Zack Dunn in the general election. Dunn attacked LaHood over his support of vouchers, and a debate held between the candidates focused almost entirely on the issue. LaHood defended his position on education by saying he was one of the only Republicans in the House to support increasing the basic allotment for public school funding. Dunn received the endorsement of the San Antonio Express-News. Dunn won the election, flipping the district to Democratic control for the first time in decades.

District 121 Republican primary
Party	Candidate	Votes	%
Republican	Marc LaHood (incumbent)	13,106	73.61%
Republican	David McArthur	4,698	26.39%
Total votes		17,804	100.0%

District 121 general election
Party	Candidate	Votes	%
Republican	Marc LaHood (incumbent)		
Democratic	Zack Dunn		
Total votes			

=== District 122 ===
Incumbent Republican Mark Dorazio ran for re-election. Willie Ng, backed by Texans for Lawsuit Reform and billionaire Miriam Adelson, owner of the Las Vegas Sands casino corporation, challenged him in the Republican primary. Adelson targeted Dorazio for his opposition to legalizing casino gambling. Dorazio ultimately won the primary by a wide margin and went against Democrat Shelly Nickels in the general election. He received the endorsement of the San Antonio Express-News. On election day Dorazio was narrowly re-elected, becoming the sole Republican representative in the San Antonio area to survive the Democratic wave.

District 122 Republican primary
Party	Candidate	Votes	%
Republican	Mark Dorazio (incumbent)	14,864	74.63%
Republican	Willie Ng	5,054	25.37%
Total votes		19,918	100.0%

District 122 general election
Party	Candidate	Votes	%
Republican	Mark Dorazio (incumbent)		
Democratic	Shelly Nickels		
Total votes			

=== District 123 ===
Incumbent Democrat Diego Bernal won re-election unopposed.

District 123 general election
Party	Candidate	Votes	%
Democratic	Diego Bernal (incumbent)		
Total votes			

=== District 124 ===
Incumbent Democrat Josey Garcia wan re-election. She received the endorsement of the San Antonio Express-News in a rematch of the 2024 election against Republican Sylvia Soto. Garcia won the race by a wide margin.

District 124 general election
Party	Candidate	Votes	%
Democratic	Josey Garcia (incumbent)		
Republican	Sylvia Soto		
Write-in	L.D. Howard		
Total votes			

=== District 125 ===
Incumbent Democrat Ray Lopez retired. Lopez had endorsed his chief of staff, Donovon Rodriguez to replace him in the crowded Democratic primary. None of the candidates received a majority and the race proceeded to a runoff between former Bexar County constable Michelle Barrientes Vela and Adrian Reyna, a San Antonio teachers' union vice president. Carlos Antonio Raymond, who has switched parties multiple times, also ran. Reyna won the runoff and faced Republican Ricardo Martinez in the general election. He also received the endorsement of the San Antonio Express-News. Reyna won the general election by a wide margin.

District 125 Democratic primary
Party	Candidate	Votes	%
Democratic	Adrian Reyna	7,271	39.10%
Democratic	Michelle Barrientes Vela	6,395	34.39%
Democratic	Donovon Rodriguez	2,856	15.36%
Democratic	Carlos Antonio Raymond	2,074	11.15%
Total votes		18,596	100.0%

District 125 Democratic primary runoff
Party	Candidate	Votes	%
Democratic	Adrian Reyna	5,878	80.10%
Democratic	Michelle Barrientes Vela	1,460	19.90%
Total votes		7,338	100.0%

District 125 Republican primary
Party	Candidate	Votes	%
Republican	Ricardo Martinez	4,141	58.60%
Republican	Chuck Mercer IV	2,925	41.40%
Total votes		7,066	100.0%

District 125 general election
Party	Candidate	Votes	%
Democratic	Adrian Reyna		
Republican	Ricardo Martinez		
Total votes			

=== District 126 ===
Incumbent Republican Sam Harless chose to retire. Harless endorsed Kelly Peterson, a former staffer of his to succeed him in the Republican primary, while governor Greg Abbott, lieutenant governor Dan Patrick, and a number of local Republican state representatives endorsed Stan Stanart. Stanart came first in the primary, but at 49% came just shy of the required majority necesitating arunoff with Peterson. Stanart won the runoff and faced Democratic nominee Stephanie Bord in the general election. The Houston Chronicle endorsed Bord, concerned by Stanart's embrace of Artificial Intelligence chatbots and right-wing conspiracy theories. Bord narrowly defeated Stanart with a margin of less than 300 votes.

District 126 Republican primary
Party	Candidate	Votes	%
Republican	Stan Stanart	6,826	49.29%
Republican	Kelly Peterson	4,070	29.39%
Republican	Polly Looper	2,953	21.32%
Total votes		13,849	100.0%

District 126 Republican primary runoff
Party	Candidate	Votes	%
Republican	Stan Stanart	7,342	67.43%
Republican	Kelly Peterson	3,546	32.57%
Total votes		10,888	100.0%

District 126 Democratic primary
Party	Candidate	Votes	%
Democratic	Stephanie Bord	8,129	66.99%
Democratic	Elizabeth Lotterhos	4,005	33.01%
Total votes		12,134	100.0%

District 126 general election
Party	Candidate	Votes	%
Republican	Stan Stanart		
Democratic	Stephanie Bord		
Total votes			

=== District 127 ===
Incumbent Republican Charles Cunningham ran for re-election. Michelle Williams, a teacher's union president, challenged Cunningham as a Democrat. A critic of the state-appointed superintendent and board of managers of Houston Independent School District, the board had voted to remove Williams from her position multiple times, which independent examiners contested as wrongful termination. Williams later won her lawsuit against the school district. The Houston Chronicle endorsed Cunningham for his work in improving flood infrastructure in the region, particularly after Hurricane Harvey, while acknowledging their preference for Williams' education policies and experience. On election day Williams narrowly defeated Cunningham with a margin of less than 2,000 votes.

District 127 general election
Party	Candidate	Votes	%
Republican	Charles Cunningham (incumbent)		
Democratic	Michelle Williams		
Total votes			

=== District 128 ===
Incumbent Republican Briscoe Cain decided to run for Texas's 9th congressional district instead of seeking re-election. Republican nominee Tom Butler campaigned heavily on expanding school vouchers and promising to "DOGE the government", while Democratic nominee Desiree Klaus was inspired to run by the 2025 Texas redistricting. The Houston Chronicle endorsed Klaus. Butler won the general election with 57% of the popular vote.

District 128 general election
Party	Candidate	Votes	%
Republican	Tom Butler		
Democratic	Desiree Klaus		
Total votes			

=== District 129 ===
Incumbent Republican Dennis Paul chose to run for Texas Senate to replace Senator Mayes Middleton, who in turn was running for Attorney General of Texas. The Houston Chronicle endorsed Republican nominee Scott Bowen for his housing policies. On election day, Bowden narrowly defeated Democrat Albert Wittliff by a margin of less than 1,000 votes.

District 129 Republican primary
Party	Candidate	Votes	%
Republican	Scott Bowen	10,964	71.57%
Republican	Bob Mitchell	4,355	28.43%
Total votes		15,319	100.0%

District 129 general election
Party	Candidate	Votes	%
Republican	Scott Bowen		
Democratic	Albert Wittliff		
Total votes			

=== District 130 ===
Incumbent Republican Tom Oliverson ran for re-election. Oliverson is a partner at U.S. Anesthesia Partners, which was accused over the summer of driving up health insurance premiums for teachers despite Oliverson's legislative priority of lowering healthcare costs. The Houston Chronicle endorsed Oliverson for, despite his staunchly conservative voting record, working to pass a number of bipartisan measures through the legislature. He faced Democrat Brett Robinson in a rematch of the 2024 election for this seat. Oliverson defeated Robinson, but by a narrower margin than the previous race.

District 130 Democratic primary
Party	Candidate	Votes	%
Democratic	Brett Robinson	7,705	69.50%
Democratic	Joel Camann	3,382	30.50%
Total votes		11,087	100.0%

District 130 general election
Party	Candidate	Votes	%
Republican	Tom Oliverson (incumbent)		
Democratic	Brett Robinson		
Total votes			

=== District 131 ===
Incumbent Democrat Alma Allen retired and endorsed her son, Lawrence Allen Jr., in the crowded primary to succeed her. None of the candidates received a majority, with Allen Jr. coming in second place behind State Board of Education member Staci Childs. Childs won the runoff and faced Republican Scott Whitmarsh in the general election. Childs received the endorsement of the Houston Chronicle for her strong policy focus on public education. Childs defeated Whirmarsh reveiving over 85% of the vote.

District 131 Democratic primary
Party	Candidate	Votes	%
Democratic	Staci Childs	7,246	45.48%
Democratic	Lawrence Allen Jr.	4,388	27.54%
Democratic	Erik Wilson	2,178	13.67%
Democratic	Crystal Dillard	1,388	8.71%
Democratic	TJ Baker	733	4.60%
Total votes		15,933	100.0%

District 131 Democratic primary
Party	Candidate	Votes	%
Democratic	Staci Childs	5,164	62.05%
Democratic	Lawrence Allen Jr.	3,158	37.95%
Total votes		8,322	100.0%

District 131 general election
Party	Candidate	Votes	%
Democratic	Staci Childs		
Republican	Scott Whitmarsh		
Total votes			

=== District 132 ===
Incumbent Republican Mike Schofield ran for re-election. Schofield played a role in drafting the state's constitutional amendment banning income taxes and sought to impose stricter requirements on local governments raising their own taxes. Democratic challenger Sara McGee campaigned in opposition to the state's school voucher program and on other healthcare issues. The Houston Chronicle endorsed McGee over disagreements with other finance-related policies championed by Schofield, which they partially blame for the budgetary difficulties Harris County found itself in. On election day, McGee defeated Schofield.

District 132 general election
Party	Candidate	Votes	%
Republican	Mike Schofield (incumbent)	39,065	46.2
Democratic	Sara McGee	45,498	53.8
Total votes			

=== District 133 ===
Incumbent Republican Mano DeAyala ran for re-election. This seat was one of seven added in June to national Democrats' list as a possible target for flipping. Democratic challenger Josh Wallenstein ran primarily on an anti-corruption platform. The Houston Chronicle endorsed DeAyala. DeAyala defeated Wallenstein receiving 53% of the vote.

District 133 general election
Party	Candidate	Votes	%
Republican	Mano DeAyala (incumbent)		
Democratic	Josh Wallenstein		
Total votes			

=== District 134 ===
Incumbent Democrat Ann Johnson ran for re-election. She faced Republican Mike Michna, who won the Republican primary, in the general election. Johnson received the endorsement of the Houston Chronicle. Johnson was re-elected defeating Michna by a wide margin.

District 134 Republican primary
Party	Candidate	Votes	%
Republican	Mike Michna	6,111	59.63%
Republican	Carolyn B. Bryant	4,138	40.37%
Total votes		10,249	100.0%

District 134 general election
Party	Candidate	Votes	%
Republican	Mike Michna		
Democratic	Ann Johnson (incumbent)		
Total votes			

=== District 135 ===
Incumbent Democrat Jon Rosenthal retired to run for Texas Railroad Commissioner. Odus Evbagharu, Rosenthal's former chief of staff, won the Democratic nomination unopposed to succeed him and faced Republican Liz Ramos in the general election. Evbagharu received the endorsement of the Houston Chronicle, describing him as "technology- and business-friendly". He defeated Ramos on election day by a wide margin.

District 135 general election
Party	Candidate	Votes	%
Democratic	Odus Evbagharu		
Republican	Liz Ramos		
Total votes			

=== District 136 ===
Incumbent Democrat John Bucy III ran for re-election. Bucy introduced legislation to eliminate cross-party control over the administration of primary elections after Republicans in Williamson and Dallas Counties switched their election day voting system to a precinct-based system as opposed to countywide voting, which forced the Democratic primary to use the same system. The change caused widespread voter confusion in the March primary, with voters being turned away from polling places for going to the wrong one. Both counties reverted to countywide voting for the May runoff election. He received the endorsement of the Austin American-Statesman. He defeated his Republican opponent Theodore Schramm receiving over 70% of the vote.

District 136 general election
Party	Candidate	Votes	%
Democratic	John Bucy III (incumbent)		
Republican	Theodore Schramm		
Total votes			

=== District 137 ===
Incumbent Democrat Gene Wu ran for re-election. Wu, as the leader of the House Democratic caucus, led the 2025 quorum bust in protest of the Republican-led mid-decade redistricting. Greg Abbott and Ken Paxton sought to remove Wu from his seat, claiming he had vacated his office, but the Texas Supreme Court denied this push, leaving that power solely within the House itself. Wu later formed a coalition of Democratic legislative leaders from several southern states to coordinate efforts to regain Democratic control in those states, calling it the "New Southern Strategy." Wu's high profile in the wake of the quorum bust led him to be subjected to significant anti-Asian racism from many Republicans who would later run for statewide office in 2026, such as Mayes Middleton and Bo French. Wu received the endorsement of the Houston Chronicle against his Republican opponent, Helen Zhou. He defeated Zhou in the general election by a wide margin.

District 137 Republican primary
Party	Candidate	Votes	%
Republican	Helen Zhou	1,926	68.69%
Republican	Robert McKenzie	878	31.31%
Total votes		2,804	100.0%

District 137 general election
Party	Candidate	Votes	%
Republican	Helen Zhou		
Democratic	Gene Wu (incumbent)		
Total votes			

=== District 138 ===
Incumbent Republican Lacey Hull ran for re-election. This seat was one of seven added in June to national Democrats' list as a possible target for flipping. Hull's Democratic challenger was gun control advocate Tyler Smith, who also campaigned on a platform of Medicaid expansion, ending school vouchers, and ending the state takeover of Houston Independent School District. Smith received the endorsement of the Houston Chronicle. On election day Smith narrowly defeated Hull, flipping contol of the seat.

District 138 Republican primary
Party	Candidate	Votes	%
Republican	Lacey Hull (incumbent)	9,289	71.05%
Republican	Josh Flynn	2,432	18.60%
Republican	Natalie Blasingame	1,353	10.35%
Total votes		13,074	100.0%

District 138 general election
Party	Candidate	Votes	%
Republican	Lacey Hull (incumbent)		
Democratic	Tyler Smith		
Total votes			

=== District 139 ===
Incumbent Democrat Charlene Ward Johnson won re-election, despite facing primary challengers. In the general election, she defeated republican Kyle Harding receiving over 78% of the vote. She was endorsement by the Houston Chronicle.

District 139 Democratic primary
Party	Candidate	Votes	%
Democratic	Charlene Ward Johnson (incumbent)	12,322	64.23%
Democratic	Dominique Payton	4,541	23.67%
Democratic	Jerry Ford	2,320	12.09%
Total votes		19,183	100.0%

District 139 general election
Party	Candidate	Votes	%
Democratic	Charlene Ward Johnson (incumbent)		
Republican	Kyle Harding		
Total votes			

=== District 140 ===
Incumbent Democrat Armando Walle ran for re-election. Laura Garcia DeLeon was his first Republican challenger since Walle took office following the 2008 elections. Walle received the endorsement of the Houston Chronicle. Walle was re-elected receiving over 80% of the vote.

District 140 general election
Party	Candidate	Votes	%
Democratic	Armando Walle (incumbent)		
Republican	Laura Garcia DeLeon		
Total votes			

=== District 141 ===
Incumbent Democrat Senfronia Thompson won re-election. First elected in 1972, Thompson is the longest-serving woman and longest-serving African American member of the legislature, taking part in the passage of a number of highly influential state laws. She received the endorsement of the Houston Chronicle. After it became clear that Democrats would win control of the chamber for the first time since 2000, Thompson declared her intention to run for Speaker of the House and quickly consolidated enough support from other lawmakers to win, putting her on track to become the state's first African American and female Speaker.

District 141 general election
Party	Candidate	Votes	%
Democratic	Senfronia Thompson (incumbent)		
Republican	Julie Hunt		
Total votes			

=== District 142 ===
Incumbent Democrat Harold Dutton Jr. ran for re-election. One of the longest-serving and most conservative Democrats in the House, having been first elected in 1984, Dutton drew multiple primary challengers. He drew additional controversy during the campaign, telling a local union "to hell with you all" after they endorsed one of his opponents, Danny Norris. Pre-election polling indicated Dutton likely would not receive a majority of the vote, facing a runoff with Norris. Despite this, Dutton won nearly 51% of the vote, narrowly avoiding a runoff to win the nomination outright. He defeated Republican Heidi Hall in the general election, winning over 80% of the vote.

District 142 Democratic primary
Party	Candidate	Votes	%
Democratic	Harold Dutton Jr. (incumbent)	8,756	50.78%
Democratic	Danyahel "Danny" Norris	5,553	32.20%
Democratic	James Joseph	2,934	17.02%
Total votes		17,243	100.0%

District 142 general election
Party	Candidate	Votes	%
Democratic	Harold Dutton Jr. (incumbent)		
Republican	Heidi Hall		
Total votes			

=== District 143 ===
Incumbent Democrat Ana Hernandez won re-election, receiving over 77% of the vote against her Republican opponent frank Salazar.

District 143 general election
Party	Candidate	Votes	%
Democratic	Ana Hernandez (incumbent)		
Republican	Frank Salazar		
Total votes			

=== District 144 ===
Incumbent Democrat Mary Ann Perezran for re-election. District 144 voted for Donald Trump in the 2024 presidential election, and it was a top target for Republicans trying to make gains in Harris County. In February 2026, Republican challenger David Flores was arrested for driving while intoxicated. A video of the arrest was released in the fall, showing Flores muttering expletives and using a racial slur, causing governor Greg Abbott to rescind his endorsement of Flores. Perez received the endorsement of the Houston Chronicle, who described Flores as "an unserious candidate" in light of his scandal. She was re-elected by a wide margin.

District 144 Democratic primary
Party	Candidate	Votes	%
Democratic	Mary Ann Perez (incumbent)	5,577	64.52%
Democratic	Emmanuel Guerrero	2,166	25.06%
Democratic	Michael Montemayor	901	10.42%
Total votes		8,644	100.0%

District 144 general election
Party	Candidate	Votes	%
Democratic	Mary Ann Perez (incumbent)		
Republican	David Flores		
Total votes			

=== District 145 ===
Incumbent Democrat Christina Morales won re-election.

District 145 general election
Party	Candidate	Votes	%
Democratic	Christina Morales (incumbent)		
Republican	Inocensia Moreno		
Total votes			

=== District 146 ===
Incumbent Democrat Lauren Ashley Simmons ran for re-election. Simmons co-chaired the commission overseeing the state takeover of Houston Independent School District, which recommended raising the threshold for future takeovers and imposing guardrails on the administrators appointed to run the district. She received the endorsement of the Houston Chronicle. Simmons won with over 80% of the vote on election day.

District 146 general election
Party	Candidate	Votes	%
Democratic	Lauren Ashley Simmons (incumbent)		
Republican	Alexandria Nicole Butler		
Total votes			

=== District 147 ===
Incumbent Democrat Jolanda Jones ran for re-election. Jones has campaigned strongly against the proliferation of artificial intelligence, particularly in education. She has also used her position to push for stronger campaigning towards African American voters, particularly targeted at U.S. Senate candidate James Talarico. She received the endorsement of the Houston Chronicle. She won re-election with over 80% of the vote.

District 147 general election
Party	Candidate	Votes	%
Democratic	Jolanda Jones (incumbent)		
Republican	Theodis Daniel		
Total votes			

=== District 148 ===
Incumbent Democrat Penny Morales Shaw ran for re-election. Republican challenger Amanda LaBrie focused her campaign on public safety and poverty. Although it was one of the more marginally Democratic-leaning districts in Harris County in 2024, Shaw was widely expected to win. She received the endorsement of the Houston Chronicle. She defeated LaBrie by a wide margin.

District 148 general election
Party	Candidate	Votes	%
Democratic	Penny Morales Shaw (incumbent)		
Republican	Amanda LaBrie		
Total votes			

=== District 149 ===
Incumbent Democrat Hubert Vo ran for re-election, losing renomination in a runoff election. Vo was first elected in 2004, defeating Republican Talmadge L. Heflin in a campaign that courted immigrant voters and criticized Heflin's vote against anti-hate crime bills and making Martin Luther King Jr. Day a state holiday, while arguing he had become out of touch with his diversifying district. In the House of Representatives, Vo gained a reputation of supporting Texas public schools despite maintaining a low profile in the chamber with very few accomplishments on his record. Going into the 2026 cycle, Vo faced multiple challengers who criticized him for being out of touch with the district and unable to meet its needs. Vo had also faced skepticism of his campaign due to a perceived absence on the campaign trail. He faced Alief ISD Board President Darlene Breaux, homeowners association president Dave Romero, and Houston Community College lecturer Mink Jawandor. The three candidates all ran on similar platforms of funding Texas public schools, expanding access to healthcare, and building new infrastructure. Breaux, who had been endorsed by the Texas AFL-CIO, the Houston Chronicle editorial board, as well as several members of the Houston City Council, ran three votes behind Vo, forcing a runoff as neither got a majority.

Going into the runoff, the two candidates had different coalitions powering their campaigns. Vo had the backing of the district's Vietnamese-American community and media institutions. However, due to his absence from the community, many Asian-American leaders had soured on his candidacy, with many planning on voting for the Republican candidate or not at all. Breaux ran with the support of various newspaper editorial boards, Houston public officials, and also the support of the Texas Legislative Black Caucus. Breaux defeated Vo by a 21-point margin. She faced Republican Dave Bennett in the general election, defeating him by a wide margin.

District 149 Democratic primary
Party	Candidate	Votes	%
Democratic	Hubert Vo (incumbent)	3,750	37.53%
Democratic	Darlene Breaux	3,747	37.50%
Democratic	Dave Romero	1,398	13.99%
Democratic	Mink Jawandor	1,097	10.98%
Total votes		9,992	100.0%

District 149 Democratic primary runoff
Party	Candidate	Votes	%
Democratic	Darlene Breaux	1,623	60.65%
Democratic	Hubert Vo (incumbent)	1,053	39.35%
Total votes		2,676	100.0%

District 149 general election
Party	Candidate	Votes	%
Democratic	Darlene Breaux		
Republican	Dave Bennett		
Total votes			

=== District 150 ===
Incumbent Republican Valoree Swanson ran for re-election. She faced Democrat A'Yonna Kellum. Despite Swanson's long tenure, the Houston Chronicle endorsed Kellum, considering Swanson too divisive and partisan. Kellum narrowly defeated Swanson with a margin of less than 1,000 votes.

District 150 Democratic primary
Party	Candidate	Votes	%
Democratic	A'yonna Kellum	6,929	56.42%
Democratic	R. L. Beatty	5,352	43.58%
Total votes		12,281	100.0%

District 150 general election
Party	Candidate	Votes	%
Republican	Valoree Swanson (incumbent)		
Democratic	A'Yonna Kellum		
Total votes			
