= Denise Wooten =

American politician

Member-elect of the Texas House of Representatives from the 63rd district
- Assuming office January 2027
- Succeeding: Ben Bumgarner

Personal details
- Party: Democratic
- Children: 2

H. Denise Wooten (born 1959/1960) is an American politician. A career psychologist, she is the Democratic member-elect of the Texas House of Representatives from the 63rd district.

== Biography ==
Wooten was born in 1959 or 1960 in Independence, Missouri. She attended William Jewell College, where she obtained her BA in psychology in 1982, and Baylor University, where she obtained her doctor of psychology degree in 1989.

Wooten worked as a clinical psychologist, having been in the field since as early as the 1990s. with her specialty being neurodevelopmental disorders. She also taught at North Central Texas College as an adjunct professor in psychology.

Wooten ran in Texas's 63rd House of Representatives district in the 2022 election. She stated that her motivation for running was to improve education, job training, and other human services. Despite winning the Democratic primary unopposed, she lost the general election to Republican candidate Ben Bumgarner 44.1% to 55.9%. She ran a second time in the 63rd district in the 2024 election, but lost in the Democratic primary to former state house representative Michelle Beckley, 33.6% to 66.4%.

Wooten ran a third time in the 63rd district in 2026; she cited affordability, educations, healthcare, and tax fairness as legislative priorities. After winning the March Democratic primary unopposed, she won the November general election 51.1% to 48.9%, unseating Bumgarner and flipping the seat.

Wooten lives in the Denton County portion of Flower Mound, Texas. She is married to a certified public accountant based in Flower Mound, and has two children as well as several grandchildren.
