= Samantha Lopez-Resendez =

American politician

Member-elect of the Texas House of Representatives from the 50th district
- Assuming office January 2027
- Succeeding: James Talarico

Personal details
- Born: 1994 or 1995 (age 31–32) San Juan, Texas, U.S.
- Party: Democratic
- Spouse: Michael Cupero (m. 2023)
- Education: Texas A&M University (BA)
- Website: Campaign website

Samantha Lopez-Resendez (born 1994 or 1995) is an American politician. A member of the Democratic party, she was elected to the Texas House of Representatives for the 50th district in the 2026 election to replace James Talarico.

== Early life ==
Lopez-Resendez was born in San Juan, Texas, in the Rio Grande Valley in 1994 or 1995 and is the daughter of parents who had immigrated to the United States. She attended Pharr-San Juan-Alamo High School in San Juan. She graduated from Texas A&M University with a Bachelor of Arts in political science in 2017.

== Career ==
Lopez-Resendez worked as an elementary school librarian for nearly two years at Vanguard Academy Mozart Elementary, a charter school in the Rio Grande Valley, before she joined the legislative staff of Donna Howard in 2019. She worked for Howard for seven years, most recently as chief of staff.

Lopez-Resendez entered the race for Texas's 50th House of Representatives district to succeed James Talarico. She received the most votes in the Democratic party primary election out of the six candidates.

She defeated Michael Olsen, a Republican, in the general election.
