= Junior Ezeonu =

American politician

- Ezeonu in 2026

Member-elect of the Texas House of Representatives from the 101st district
- Assuming office TBD
- Succeeding: Chris Turner

Personal details
- Born: Steven C. Ezeonu; March 14, 1999 (age 27) Onitsha, Nigeria
- Party: Democratic
- Education: University of Texas at Arlington (BA)

Steven C. "Junior" Ezeonu (born March 14, 1999) is an American politician who is the Democratic member-elect for the 101st district of the Texas House of Representatives in the 2026 election. He defeated incumbent state representative and former minority leader Chris Turner in the Democratic primary and "is effectively the district’s representative-elect" as no challengers filed for the general election.

Ezeonu has served as an at-large member of the Grand Prairie city council since 2021.

== Early life and career ==
Ezeonu was born in Onitsha, Nigeria, and his family moved to Texas when he was 2-years old and he grew up in Arlington, Texas. He attended Bryant Elementary School, Barnett Junior High School and Bowie High School. He then graduated summa cum laude from the University of Texas at Arlington with a Bachelor of Arts degree in political science in July 2021.

He works as a political consultant at nonprofit Climate Cabinet Action, having previously served as the field director for state representative Mihaela Plesa's 2022 campaign and worked on Kim Olson’s unsuccessful bid for Texas Democratic Party chair.

== Political career ==
=== Grand Prairie city council ===
In June 2021, Ezeonu was elected to an at-large seat of the Grand Prairie city council. At 22 years old, he was the council's youngest elected member ever. In June 2025, at 26 years old, he became the youngest mayor pro tem in the city's history.

=== Texas House of Representatives ===
In March 2026, Ezeonu defeated Chris Turner in the Democratic primary for Texas House of Representatives. Despite being outspent between the start of the year and election day— Turner had spent $830,000 compared to Ezeonu’s $71,000— Ezeonu defeated Turner with nearly 53% of the vote.
