= Kristen Plaisance =

American politician

Member of the Texas House of Representatives from the 3rd district
- Incumbent
- Assumed office TBD
- Preceded by: Cecil Bell Jr.

Personal details
- Born: Kristen Kwiecinski
- Party: Republican
- Spouse: Robbie Plaisance (m. 2000)
- Children: 5 (Note: Includes two stepchildren.)

Kristen Plaisance (née Kwiecinski) is an American photographer and politician who is the Republican member-elect for the 3rd district of the Texas House of Representatives in the 2026 election. She defeated incumbent Cecil Bell Jr. in the Republican primary election with support from megadonor Tim Dunn.

== Texas House of Representatives ==
Plaisance defeated incumbent state representative Cecil Bell Jr. in the Republican primary election with support from megadonor Tim Dunn. She defeated Democratic nominee Nicole King with 67% of the vote in the general election.

In the runoff election for the Republican primary in the 2026 U.S. Senate election, Plaisance endorsed attorney general Ken Paxton over incumbent John Cornyn.

== Personal life ==
Plaisance met her husband, Robbie, at a bar on Bourbon Street in New Orleans and the two got married in 2000. They each had two children from their previous marriages then had a son. A photographer, she ran Plaisance Photography in Kingwood, Houston.
