= Angie Carraway =

American politician

Member-elect of the Texas House of Representatives from the 89th district
- Assuming office January 2027
- Succeeding: Candy Noble

Personal details
- Party: Democratic
- Spouse: Robert Carraway

Angie Carraway is an American educator and politician. A middle school teacher, she is the Democratic member-elect of the Texas House of Representatives for District 89 since January 2027.

== Biography ==
Carraway was born in Dallas County, Texas, and as a military brat moved frequently. After graduating from Morgantown High School, Carraway studied at the University of North Texas, where she obtained a BA in sociology in 2011, and Western Governors University, where she obtained a MS in curriculum and instruction in 2024.

Carraway's career started in the restaurant industry. In 2012, Carraway started working as a middle school teacher in both Lovejoy and Princeton ISDs, with subjects taught including history and social studies.

Carraway ran in the 2026 Texas House of Representatives election in District 89, which covers the southeastern portion of Collin County. The district had been represented by Candy Noble. Her campaign emphasized government transparency, housing affordability, and public education as main priorities. After winning the March Democratic primary, she won the November general election, defeating Republican incumbent Candy Noble 50.8% to 49.2% amidst the midterm "blue wave".

Carraway is Latina. A resident of Collin County since the 1990s, she is married to Robert Carraway.
