= Julio Salinas (politician) =

American politician

Member-elect of the Texas House of Representatives from the 41st district
- Assuming office January 2027
- Succeeding: Robert Guerra

Personal details
- Party: Democratic
- Education: University of Texas at Austin

Julio Salinas is an American politician. A member of the Democratic Party, he is the member-elect for the 41st district of the Texas House of Representatives. Prior to being elected, he worked as a legislative director.

Salinas graduated from Sharyland Pioneer High School in Hidalgo County, Texas. He then attended the University of Texas Rio Grande Valley before receiving a bachelor's degree from the University of Texas at Austin.
