= Stephanie Saenz =

American politician

Member-elect of the Texas House of Representatives from the 34th district
- Assuming office January 2027
- Succeeding: Denise Villalobos

Personal details
- Party: Democratic

Stephanie Saenz is an American politician. A member of the Democratic Party, she is the member-elect for the 34th district of the Texas House of Representatives.
