= Ray Callas =

American politician

Member-elect of the Texas House of Representatives from the 21st district
- Assuming office January 2027
- Succeeding: Dade Phelan

Personal details
- Party: Republican

Ray Callas is an American politician. A member of the Republican Party, he is the member-elect for the 21st district of the Texas House of Representatives.
