= Texas's 50th House of Representatives district =

American legislative district

Texas's 50th State House of Representatives district
Representative
James Talarico; D–Austin
- Demographics: 30.7% White; 14.9% Black; 43.1% Hispanic; 11.2% Asian
- Population (2020) • Voting age: 202,082; 158,533

The Texas House of Representatives 50th district represents a northeast portion of Austin and a small part of southern Pflugerville, both in Travis County. The current representative is Senator-elect James Talarico, who won in 2022 after previously being Representative for Texas State House district 52.

== List of representatives ==
- Celia Israel, 2014–2022
- James Talarico, 2023–present
- Samantha Lopez-Resendez, 2027–
