= Jay Hardaway =

American politician

Jay Hardaway is an American politician. A member of the Republican Party, he is the member-elect for the 71st district of the Texas House of Representatives.
