= Oziel Ochoa =

American politician

Member-elect of the Texas House of Representatives from the 37th district
- Assuming office January 2027
- Succeeding: Janie Lopez

Personal details
- Born: Oziel Ochoa Jr.
- Party: Democratic

Oziel Ochoa Jr. is an American politician. A member of the Democratic Party, he is the member-elect for the 37th district of the Texas House of Representatives.
