= Sara McGee =

American politician

Sara McGee is the Representative-elect for Texas House of Representatives’ 132nd district. She graduated from Katy High School and received her bachelor's degree from Midwestern State University in 2020. She currently works as a healthcare administrator.
