= Chris Spencer (politician) =

American politician

Member-elect of the Texas House of Representatives from the 1st district
- Assuming office January 2027
- Succeeding: Gary VanDeaver

Personal details
- Party: Republican

Chris Spencer is an American politician. A member of the Republican Party, he is the member-elect for the 1st district of the Texas House of Representatives.
