= Odus Evbagharu =

American politician

- Evbagharu in 2022

Member-elect of the Texas House of Representatives from the 135th district
- Assuming office January 2027
- Succeeding: Jon Rosenthal

Chair of the Harris County Democratic Party
- In office June 27, 2021 – 2023
- Preceded by: Lillie Schechter

Personal details
- Born: London, United Kingdom
- Party: Democratic
- Education: University of Houston

Odus Evbagharu is an British-American politician and political organizer. He is the Democratic member-elect of the Texas House of Representatives from the 135th district. Prior to his victory, he was chair of the Harris County Democratic Party from 2021 to 2023, as well as campaign organizer and chief of staff to Texas State Representative Jon Rosenthal.

== Biography ==
Evbagharu was born in London in 1991 or 1992; his parents were immigrants from Nigeria. The family later emigrated to the United States, before moving from Indiana to Cypress when he was ten years old. He attended school in the Cypress-Fairbanks Independent School District. including Langham Creek High School. He obtained his BA in political science from the University of Houston in 2018.

During the 2018 Texas House of Representatives election, Evbagharu served as campaign manager for Jon Rosenthal's successful campaign in the 135th district, which is based in western areas of Harris County such as northwestern Houston. Evbagharu told Politico that the campaign had targeted BIPOC communities for door-knocking amidst "a perception of the suburbs that, ‘Oh, it’s all these white, affluent people" which would discourage prospects of district flipability.

Evbagharu is owner-operator of Onward Strategy Group, a consultancy firm involved in politics and community affairs. His political organizer work includes a Democratic majority in the Harris County Commissioners Court, three successful Cy-Fair ISD trustee campaigns in 2025, and Christian Menefee's campaign in the 2025–26 Texas's 18th congressional district special election.

In 2021, Evbagharu ran for chair of the Harris County Democratic Party with the endorsements of the party chairs of more than 100 precincts. He was elected to the position on June 27, 2021, becoming both the youngest and the first Black chair. Evbagharu replaced Lillie Schechter, who had served as chair since 2017. He served in the position until 2023. He has also held a treasurer position in the Texas Democratic Party. He later became chief of staff at Rosenthal's state house office.

On September 29, 2025, Rosenthal announced that he would step down from the state house to run in the 2026 Texas Railroad Commissioner election. Evbagharu subsequently was the first to start a Democratic campaign for Rosenthal's seat, with Rosenthal's endorsement. His campaign priorities included the economy, healthcare, and infrastructure. He won the general election in November 2026, defeating Republican candidate Liz Ramos 67% to 33%.

Evbagharu told the Houston Press about Rosenthal, his mentor, that "our families spend Christmases together". Evbagharu is an American and British dual citizen.
