= Katie O'Brien Duzan =

American politician

Katie O'Brien Duzan is an American politician. A member of the Democratic Party, she is the member-elect for the 94th district of the Texas House of Representatives. Her campaign has received endorsements from public education advocates, labor organizations, and local Democratic officials.

== Electoral history ==
See also: Texas's 94th House of Representatives district

Incumbent Republican Tony Tinderholt is retiring to run for Tarrant County Commissioners Court Precinct 2. This seat is one of fourteen added in June to national Democrats' list as a possible target for flipping the Texas Legislature.
