= Rocky Thigpen =

American politician

Member-elect of the Texas House of Representatives from the 9th district
- Assuming office January 2027
- Succeeding: Trent Ashby

Personal details
- Party: Republican
- Spouse: Terry
- Children: 4
- Education: Stephen F. Austin State University
- Occupation: Politician; DPS sergeant

Rocky Thigpen is an American politician and retired law enforcement officer. A member of the Republican Party, he is the member-elect for the 9th district of the Texas House of Representatives.

== Background ==
A graduate of Stephen F. Austin State University, Thigpen was a sergeant for the Texas Department of Public Safety (DPS) before retiring in 2018. He previosly has served a member of the Lufkin City Council and as precinct 1 commissioner for the Angelina County Commissioners Court.

He is a member of Harmony Hill Baptist Church, and he and his wife, Terry, have four sons.
