= 2018 Texas House of Representatives election =

- November 6, 2018

All 150 seats in the Texas House of Representatives 76 seats needed for a majority
- Turnout: 52.72% ▼6.67%
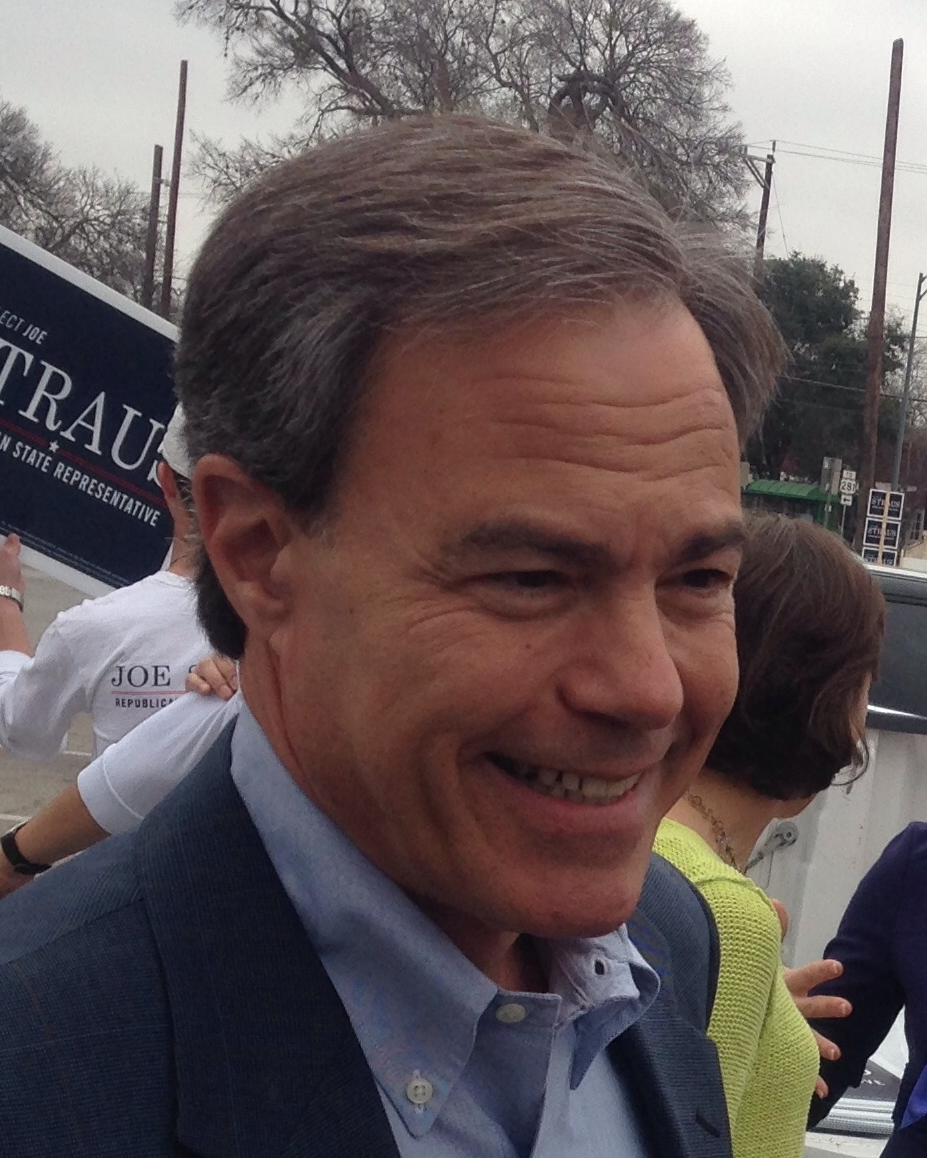

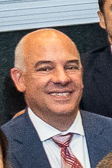
	Majority party	Minority party
Leader	Joe Straus (retired)	Chris Turner
Party	Republican	Democratic
Leader since	January 13, 2009	January 30, 2017
Leader's seat	121st	101st
Last election	95	55
Seats won	83	67
Seat change	▼12	▲12
Popular vote	4,059,519	3,606,965
Percentage	52.43%	46.58%
Swing	▼9.67%	▲11.02%
- Republican hold Democratic hold Democratic gain Republican: 40–50% 50–60% 60–70% 70–80% 80–90% ≥90% Democratic: 40–50% 50–60% 60–70% 70–80% 80–90% ≥90%
Speaker before election
Joe Straus
Republican
Elected Speaker
Dennis Bonnen
Republican

The 2018 Texas House of Representatives elections took place as part of the biennial United States elections. Texas voters elected state representatives in all 150 of the state house's districts. The winners of this election served in the 86th Texas Legislature. State representatives serve two-year terms in the Texas House. An archived statewide map of Texas' state House districts from the Texas Legislative Council can be found here, and individual district maps can be obtained from the U.S. Census here.

A primary election on March 6, 2018, determined which candidates appeared on the November 6 general election ballot. Primary election results can be obtained from the Texas Secretary of State's website.

Following the 2016 state house elections, Republicans maintained effective control of the House with 95 members. Democrats held 55 seats following the 2016 elections.

In the 2018 election, Democrats flipped 12 seats in the Texas House, leaving Republicans with an 83–67 advantage in the House.

This election marks the first time since 2008 that Democrats had won a state house race in Williamson, Hays, or Blanco counties, as well as the first time since 1982 that Democrats had won a state house race in Denton County.

== Predictions ==
Despite a competitive race for U.S. Senate in the state, analysts did not consider control of the Texas House to be in play. Despite this, they acknowledged that Democrats were likely to make gains in the chamber, predicting that they would gain a single-digit number of seats.

Source	Ranking	As of
Governing	Likely R	Oct. 8, 2018

== Results ==
Summary of the November 6, 2018 Texas House of Representatives election results
Party	Candi- dates	Votes	%	Seats	+/–	%
Republican Party	113	4,059,519	52.43%	83	▼12	55.33%
Democratic Party	132	3,606,965	46.58%	67	▲12	44.67%
Libertarian Party	27	64,219	0.83%	0	–	0%
Independent	1	11,995	0.15%	0	–	0%
Write-in	2	544	0.00%	0	–	
Total		7,743,242	100.00%	150	–	

Popular vote
Republican	52.24%
Democratic	46.92%
Libertarian	0.83%
Independent	0.15%
Write-in	0.00%

House seats won
Republican	55.33%
Democratic	44.67%

=== Close races ===
Seats where the margin of victory was under 10%:

1. District 138, 0.10%
2. District 132, 0.15% (gain)
3. District 108, 0.28%
4. District 66, 0.58%
5. District 112, 2.08%
6. District 67, 2.30%
7. District 65, 2.32% (gain)
8. District 92, 2.39%
9. District 135, 3.16% (gain)
10. District 45, 3.20% (gain)
11. District 52, 3.46% (gain)
12. District 96, 3.63%
13. District 47, 4.80% (gain)
14. District 26, 4.82%
15. District 102, 5.76% (gain)
16. District 134, 6.34% (tipping-point district)
17. District 113, 6.96% (gain)
18. District 54, 7.60%
19. District 93, 7.74%
20. District 28, 8.32%
21. District 64, 8.32%
22. District 97, 8.33%
23. District 121, 8.44%
24. District 94, 9.03%
25. District 105, 9.48% (gain)
26. District 136, 9.64% (gain)
27. District 126, 9.68%

=== Results by district ===
Election results:

District	Democratic		Republican		Others		Total		Result
District	Votes	%	Votes	%	Votes	%	Votes	%	Result
District 1	-	-	43,340	100.00%	-	-	43,340	100.00%	Republican hold
District 2	11,432	19.96%	45,843	80.04%	-	-	57,275	100.00%	Republican hold
District 3	15,352	24.00%	48,619	76.00%	-	-	63,971	100.00%	Republican hold
District 4	14,581	24.19%	44,669	74.10%	1,029	1.71%	60,279	100.00%	Republican hold
District 5	11,610	20.65%	44,604	79.35%	-	-	56,214	100.00%	Republican hold
District 6	11,995	24.40%	37,172	80.04%	-	-	49,167	100.00%	Republican hold
District 7	-	-	39,588	100.00%	-	-	39,588	100.00%	Republican hold
District 8	10,171	21.78%	36,535	78.22%	-	-	46,706	100.00%	Republican hold
District 9	-	-	45,918	100.00%	-	-	45,918	100.00%	Republican hold
District 10	17,445	27.45%	44,652	70.26%	1,453	2.29%	63,550	100.00%	Republican hold
District 11	13,350	25.64%	38,716	74.36%	-	-	52,066	100.00%	Republican hold
District 12	15,855	32.41%	33,063	67.59%	-	-	48,918	100.00%	Republican hold
District 13	13,494	20.88%	51,126	79.12%	-	-	64,620	100.00%	Republican hold
District 14	20,817	43.62%	26,906	56.38%	-	-	47,723	100.00%	Republican hold
District 15	25,915	32.85%	52,975	67.15%	-	-	78,890	100.00%	Republican hold
District 16	12,059	19.67%	49,233	80.33%	-	-	61,292	100.00%	Republican hold
District 17	20,069	37.45%	33,522	62.55%	-	-	53,591	100.00%	Republican hold
District 18	11,559	24.51%	35,597	75.49%	-	-	47,156	100.00%	Republican hold
District 19	10,112	16.81%	50,046	83.19%	-	-	60,158	100.00%	Republican hold
District 20	23,069	28.50%	57,885	71.50%	-	-	80,954	100.00%	Republican hold
District 21	-	-	46,435	100.00%	-	-	46,435	100.00%	Republican hold
District 22	31,441	100.00%	-	-	-	-	31,441	100.00%	Democratic hold
District 23	24,181	41.43%	32,951	56.46%	1,234	2.11%	58,366	100.00%	Republican hold
District 24	19,586	28.37%	48,045	69.59%	1,405	2.04%	69,036	100.00%	Republican hold
District 25	-	-	40,902	100.00%	-	-	40,902	100.00%	Republican hold
District 26	31,330	47.59%	34,504	52.41%	-	-	65,834	100.00%	Republican hold
District 27	47,450	100.00%	-	-	-	-	47,450	100.00%	Democratic hold
District 28	37,584	45.84%	44,414	54.16%	-	-	81,998	100.00%	Republican hold
District 29	-	-	46,810	100.00%	-	-	46,810	100.00%	Republican hold
District 30	13,430	25.30%	39,653	74.70%	-	-	53,083	100.00%	Republican hold
District 31	27,492	100.00%	-	-	-	-	27,492	100.00%	Democratic hold
District 32	-	-	38,359	100.00%	-	-	38,359	100.00%	Republican hold
District 33	29,013	35.00%	53,870	65.00%	-	-	82,883	100.00%	Republican hold
District 34	25,246	61.11%	16,065	38.89%	-	-	41,311	100.00%	Democratic hold
District 35	23,351	100.00%	-	-	-	-	23,351	100.00%	Democratic hold
District 36	25,971	100.00%	-	-	-	-	25,971	100.00%	Democratic hold
District 37	20,314	100.00%	-	-	-	-	20,314	100.00%	Democratic hold
District 38	25,019	100.00%	-	-	-	-	25,019	100.00%	Democratic hold
District 39	25,822	100.00%	-	-	-	-	25,822	100.00%	Democratic hold
District 40	24,252	100.00%	-	-	-	-	24,252	100.00%	Democratic hold
District 41	24,804	61.49%	15,535	38.51%	-	-	40,339	100.00%	Democratic hold
District 42	25,392	74.31%	8,778	25.69%	-	-	34,170	100.00%	Democratic hold
District 43	16,854	38.88%	26,490	61.12%	-	-	43,344	100.00%	Republican hold
District 44	22,253	31.36%	48,704	68.64%	-	-	70,957	100.00%	Republican hold
District 45	43,207	51.60%	40,531	48.40%	-	-	73,738	100.00%	Democratic gain
District 46	46,893	82.23%	8,525	14.95%	1,608	2.82%	57,026	100.00%	Democratic hold
District 47	55,307	52.40%	50,244	47.60%	-	-	105,551	100.00%	Democratic gain
District 48	67,952	100.00%	-	-	-	-	67,952	100.00%	Democratic hold
District 49	76,851	83.00%	15,736	17.00%	-	-	92,587	100.00%	Democratic hold
District 50	52,652	100.00%	-	-	-	-	52,652	100.00%	Democratic hold
District 51	50,282	100.00%	-	-	-	-	50,282	100.00%	Democratic hold
District 52	36,798	51.73%	34,340	48.27%	-	-	71,138	100.00%	Democratic gain
District 53	14,449	21.45%	52,899	78.55%	-	-	67,348	100.00%	Republican hold
District 54	22,357	46.20%	26,037	53.80%	-	-	48,394	100.00%	Republican hold
District 55	-	-	34,297	100.00%	-	-	34,297	100.00%	Republican hold
District 56	19,713	34.22%	37,893	65.78%	-	-	57,606	100.00%	Republican hold
District 57	10,912	20.96%	41,158	79.04%	-	-	52,070	100.00%	Republican hold
District 58	-	-	49,255	100.00%	-	-	49,255	100.00%	Republican hold
District 59	-	-	39,453	100.00%	-	-	39,453	100.00%	Republican hold
District 60	-	-	56,741	100.00%	-	-	56,741	100.00%	Republican hold
District 61	-	-	66,735	100.00%	-	-	66,735	100.00%	Republican hold
District 62	12,076	21.90%	41,994	76.16%	1,072	1.94%	55,142	100.00%	Republican hold
District 63	25,994	32.88%	52,971	67.12%	-	-	78,915	100.00%	Republican hold
District 64	30,535	44.49%	36,239	52.81%	1,852	2.70%	68,626	100.00%	Republican hold
District 65	29,972	51.16%	28,614	48.84%	-	-	58,586	100.00%	Democratic gain
District 66	33,991	49.71%	34,382	50.29%	-	-	68,373	100.00%	Republican hold
District 67	35,596	48.85%	37,268	51.15%	-	-	72,864	100.00%	Republican hold
District 68	-	-	45,916	100.00%	-	-	45,916	100.00%	Republican hold
District 69	-	-	36,068	100.00%	-	-	36,068	100.00%	Republican hold
District 70	32,543	38.25%	52,526	61.75%	-	-	85,069	100.00%	Republican hold
District 71	10,828	21.95%	38,511	78.05%	-	-	49,339	100.00%	Republican hold
District 72	-	-	41,840	100.00%	-	-	41,840	100.00%	Republican hold
District 73	23,333	25.22%	69,203	74.78%	-	-	92,536	100.00%	Republican hold
District 74	25,439	100.00%	-	-	-	-	25,439	100.00%	Democratic hold
District 75	30,201	100.00%	-	-	-	-	30,201	100.00%	Democratic hold
District 76	29,445	100.00%	-	-	-	-	29,445	100.00%	Democratic hold
District 77	27,685	100.00%	-	-	-	-	27,685	100.00%	Democratic hold
District 78	31,882	65.24%	16,987	34.76%	-	-	48,869	100.00%	Democratic hold
District 79	33,015	100.00%	-	-	-	-	33,015	100.00%	Democratic hold
District 80	27,781	100.00%	-	-	-	-	27,781	100.00%	Democratic hold
District 81	9,692	25.01%	29,063	74.99%	-	-	38,755	100.00%	Republican hold
District 82	9,677	19.87%	39,030	80.13%	-	-	48,707	100.00%	Republican hold
District 83	13,309	22.68%	45,379	77.32%	-	-	58,688	100.00%	Republican hold
District 84	18,237	39.85%	27,528	60.15%	-	-	45,765	100.00%	Republican hold
District 85	24,668	43.52%	32,019	56.48%	-	-	56,687	100.00%	Republican hold
District 86	10,221	17.87%	46,991	82.13%	-	-	57,212	100.00%	Republican hold
District 87	-	-	32,314	100.00%	-	-	32,314	100.00%	Republican hold
District 88	6,486	16.25%	33,425	83.75%	-	-	39,911	100.00%	Republican hold
District 89	30,203	40.46%	44,445	59.54%	-	-	74,648	100.00%	Republican hold
District 90	20,728	100.00%	-	-	-	-	20,728	100.00%	Democratic hold
District 91	19,905	36.52%	34,606	63.48%	-	-	54,511	100.00%	Republican hold
District 92	28,327	47.43%	29,755	49.82%	1,644	2.75%	59,726	100.00%	Republican hold
District 93	26,445	46.13%	30,878	53.87%	-	-	57,323	100.00%	Republican hold
District 94	27,145	43.91%	32,448	52.94%	2,230	3.61%	61,823	100.00%	Republican hold
District 95	33,022	76.51%	9,399	21.78%	737	1.71%	43,158	100.00%	Democratic hold
District 96	30,360	47.21%	32,698	50.84%	1,256	1.95%	64,314	100.00%	Republican hold
District 97	29,665	44.86%	35,171	53.19%	1,289	1.95%	66,125	100.00%	Republican hold
District 98	24,417	29.34%	56,793	68.25%	2,007	2.41%	83,217	100.00%	Republican hold
District 99	21,111	35.69%	38,048	64.31%	-	-	59,159	100.00%	Republican hold
District 100	33,933	100.00%	-	-	-	-	33,933	100.00%	Democratic hold
District 101	31,127	87.39%	-	-	4,490	12.61%	35,617	100.00%	Democratic hold
District 102	30,025	52.88%	26,758	47.12%	-	-	56,783	100.00%	Democratic gain
District 103	29,936	78.25%	8,322	21.75%	-	-	38,258	100.00%	Democratic hold
District 104	26,078	100.00%	-	-	-	-	26,078	100.00%	Democratic hold
District 105	24,579	54.74%	20,324	45.26%	-	-	44,903	100.00%	Democratic gain
District 106	34,651	41.69%	48,460	58.31%	-	-	83,111	100.00%	Republican hold
District 107	29,058	57.10%	21,829	42.90%	-	-	50,887	100.00%	Democratic hold
District 108	39,207	49.86%	39,427	50.14%	-	-	78,634	100.00%	Republican hold
District 109	51,975	99.00%	-	-	524	1.00%	52,499	100.00%	Democratic hold
District 110	27,300	100.00%	-	-	-	-	27,300	100.00%	Democratic hold
District 111	44,377	100.00%	-	-	-	-	44,377	100.00%	Democratic hold
District 112	26,016	48.96%	27,126	51.04%	-	-	53,142	100.00%	Republican hold
District 113	28,170	53.48%	24,500	46.52%	-	-	52,670	100.00%	Democratic gain
District 114	37,020	55.65%	29,508	44.35%	-	-	66,528	100.00%	Democratic gain
District 115	32,214	56.79%	24,512	43.21%	-	-	56,726	100.00%	Democratic gain
District 116	32,538	70.40%	13,680	29.60%	-	-	46,218	100.00%	Democratic hold
District 117	32,976	57.39%	24,480	42.61%	-	-	57,456	100.00%	Democratic hold
District 118	24,032	58.05%	17,376	41.95%	-	-	41,399	100.00%	Democratic hold
District 119	30,331	100.00%	-	-	-	-	30,331	100.00%	Democratic hold
District 120	28,864	68.37%	13,354	31.63%	-	-	42,218	100.00%	Democratic hold
District 121	32,679	44.73%	38,843	53.17%	1,529	2.09%	73,051	100.00%	Republican hold
District 122	35,851	38.07%	58,311	61.93%	-	-	94,162	100.00%	Republican hold
District 123	36,851	100.00%	-	-	-	-	36,851	100.00%	Democratic hold
District 124	31,835	67.64%	15,229	32.36%	-	-	47,064	100.00%	Democratic hold
District 125	32,953	81.38%	-	-	7,541	18.62%	40,494	100.00%	Democratic hold
District 126	25,035	45.16%	30,399	54.84%	-	-	55,434	100.00%	Republican hold
District 127	-	-	44,595	80.24%	10,981	19.76%	55,576	100.00%	Republican hold
District 128	-	-	38,197	100.00%	-	-	38,197	100.00%	Republican hold
District 129	27,054	41.82%	36,554	56.51%	1,076	1.66%	64,684	100.00%	Republican hold
District 130	22,598	29.68%	52,106	68.44%	1,428	1.88%	76,132	100.00%	Republican hold
District 131	35,930	85.81%	5,940	14.19%	-	-	41,870	100.00%	Democratic hold
District 132	32,841	49.26%	32,728	49.09%	1,106	1.66%	66,675	100.00%	Democratic gain
District 133	29,844	41.89%	41,400	58.11%	-	-	71,244	100.00%	Republican hold
District 134	41,637	46.83%	47,277	53.17%	-	-	88,914	100.00%	Republican hold
District 135	28,473	50.81%	26,701	47.65%	867	1.55%	56,041	100.00%	Democratic gain
District 136	41,592	53.37%	34,084	43.73%	2,258	2.90%	77,934	100.00%	Democratic gain
District 137	17,616	88.28%	-	-	2,338	11.72%	19,954	100.00%	Democratic hold
District 138	24,175	49.93%	24,222	50.03%	20	0.04%	48,417	100.00%	Republican hold
District 139	37,159	92.79%	-	-	2,887	7.21%	40,046	100.00%	Democratic hold
District 140	19,188	100.00%	-	-	-	-	19,188	100.00%	Democratic hold
District 141	27,946	100.00%	-	-	-	-	27,946	100.00%	Democratic hold
District 142	32,087	100.00%	-	-	-	-	32,087	100.00%	Democratic hold
District 143	22,504	100.00%	-	-	-	-	22,504	100.00%	Democratic hold
District 144	14,349	61.18%	9,106	38.82%	-	-	23,455	100.00%	Democratic hold
District 145	24,269	90.36%	-	-	2,590	9.64%	26,859	100.00%	Democratic hold
District 146	35,656	92.89%	-	-	2,731	7.11%	38,387	100.00%	Democratic hold
District 147	44,314	80.80%	10,528	19.20%	-	-	54,842	100.00%	Democratic hold
District 148	32,231	67.91%	15,228	32.09%	-	-	47,459	100.00%	Democratic hold
District 149	27,071	88.32%	-	-	3,581	11.68%	30,652	100.00%	Democratic hold
District 150	29,888	42.22%	40,907	57.78%	-	-	70,795	100.00%	Republican hold
Total	3,636,690	46.92%	4,049,073	52.24%	64,763	0.84%	7,750,526	100.00%	

State House district	Incumbent	Party	Elected representative	Party
1st	Gary VanDeaver	Republican	Gary VanDeaver	Republican
2nd	Dan Flynn	Republican	Dan Flynn	Republican
3rd	Cecil Bell Jr.	Republican	Cecil Bell Jr.	Republican
4th	Lance Gooden	Republican	Keith Bell	Republican
5th	Cole Hefner	Republican	Cole Hefner	Republican
6th	Matt Schaefer	Republican	Matt Schaefer	Republican
7th	Jay Dean	Republican	Jay Dean	Republican
8th	Byron Cook	Republican	Cody Harris	Republican
9th	Chris Paddie	Republican	Chris Paddie	Republican
10th	John Wray	Republican	John Wray	Republican
11th	Travis Clardy	Republican	Travis Clardy	Republican
12th	Kyle Kacal	Republican	Kyle Kacal	Republican
13th	Ben Leman	Republican	Ben Leman	Republican
14th	John N. Raney	Republican	John N. Raney	Republican
15th	Mark Keough	Republican	Steve Toth	Republican
16th	Will Metcalf	Republican	Will Metcalf	Republican
17th	John Cyrier	Republican	John Cyrier	Republican
18th	Ernest Bailes	Republican	Ernest Bailes	Republican
19th	James White	Republican	James White	Republican
20th	Terry Wilson	Republican	Terry Wilson	Republican
21st	Dade Phelan	Republican	Dade Phelan	Republican
22nd	Joe Deshotel	Democrat	Joe Deshotel	Democrat
23rd	Wayne Faircloth	Republican	Mayes Middleton	Republican
24th	Greg Bonnen	Republican	Greg Bonnen	Republican
25th	Dennis Bonnen	Republican	Dennis Bonnen	Republican
26th	Rick Miller	Republican	Rick Miller	Republican
27th	Ron Reynolds	Democrat	Ron Reynolds	Democrat
28th	John M. Zerwas	Republican	John M. Zerwas	Republican
29th	Ed Thompson	Republican	Ed Thompson	Republican
30th	Geanie Morrison	Republican	Geanie Morrison	Republican
31st	Ryan Guillen	Democrat	Ryan Guillen	Democrat
32nd	Todd Ames Hunter	Republican	Todd Ames Hunter	Republican
33rd	Justin Holland	Republican	Justin Holland	Republican
34th	Abel Herrero	Democrat	Abel Herrero	Democrat
35th	Oscar Longoria	Democrat	Oscar Longoria	Democrat
36th	Sergio Muñoz Jr.	Democrat	Sergio Muñoz Jr.	Democrat
37th	Rene Oliveira	Democrat	Alex Dominguez	Democrat
38th	Eddie Lucio III	Democrat	Eddie Lucio III	Democrat
39th	Armando Martinez	Democrat	Armando Martinez	Democrat
40th	Terry Canales	Democrat	Terry Canales	Democrat
41st	Robert Guerra	Democrat	Robert Guerra	Democrat
42nd	Richard Raymond	Democrat	Richard Raymond	Democrat
43rd	Jose Manuel Lozano Jr.	Republican	Jose Manuel Lozano Jr.	Republican
44th	John Kuempel	Republican	John Kuempel	Republican
45th	Jason Isaac	Republican	Erin Zwiener	Democrat
46th	Dawnna Dukes	Democrat	Sheryl Cole	Democrat
47th	Paul D. Workman	Republican	Vikki Goodwin	Democrat
48th	Donna Howard	Democrat	Donna Howard	Democrat
49th	Gina Hinojosa	Democrat	Gina Hinojosa	Democrat
50th	Celia Israel	Democrat	Celia Israel	Democrat
51st	Eddie Rodriguez	Democrat	Eddie Rodriguez	Democrat
52nd	Vacant	Republican	James Talarico	Democrat
53rd	Andrew Murr	Republican	Andrew Murr	Republican
54th	Scott Cosper	Republican	Brad Buckley	Republican
55th	Hugh Shine	Republican	Hugh Shine	Republican
56th	Charles Anderson	Republican	Charles Anderson	Republican
57th	Trent Ashby	Republican	Trent Ashby	Republican
58th	DeWayne Burns	Republican	DeWayne Burns	Republican
59th	J. D. Sheffield	Republican	J. D. Sheffield	Republican
60th	Mike Lang	Republican	Mike Lang	Republican
61st	Phil King	Republican	Phil King	Republican
62nd	Vacant	Republican	Reggie Smith	Republican
63rd	Tan Parker	Republican	Tan Parker	Republican
64th	Lynn Stucky	Republican	Lynn Stucky	Republican
65th	Ron Simmons	Republican	Michelle Beckley	Democrat
66th	Matt Shaheen	Republican	Matt Shaheen	Republican
67th	Jeff Leach	Republican	Jeff Leach	Republican
68th	Drew Springer Jr.	Republican	Drew Springer Jr.	Republican
69th	James Frank	Republican	James Frank	Republican
70th	Scott Sanford	Republican	Scott Sanford	Republican
71st	Stan Lambert	Republican	Stan Lambert	Republican
72nd	Drew Darby	Republican	Drew Darby	Republican
73rd	Kyle Biedermann	Republican	Kyle Biedermann	Republican
74th	Poncho Nevárez	Democrat	Poncho Nevárez	Democrat
75th	Mary González	Democrat	Mary González	Democrat
76th	Cesar Blanco	Democrat	Cesar Blanco	Democrat
77th	Evelina Ortega	Democrat	Evelina Ortega	Democrat
78th	Joe Moody	Democrat	Joe Moody	Democrat
79th	Joe Pickett	Democrat	Joe Pickett	Democrat
80th	Tracy King	Democrat	Tracy King	Democrat
81st	Brooks Landgraf	Republican	Brooks Landgraf	Republican
82nd	Tom Craddick	Republican	Tom Craddick	Republican
83rd	Dustin Burrows	Republican	Dustin Burrows	Republican
84th	John Frullo	Republican	John Frullo	Republican
85th	Phil Stephenson	Republican	Phil Stephenson	Republican
86th	John T. Smithee	Republican	John T. Smithee	Republican
87th	Four Price	Republican	Four Price	Republican
88th	Ken King	Republican	Ken King	Republican
89th	Jodie Anne Laubenberg	Republican	Candy Noble	Republican
90th	Ramon Romero Jr.	Democrat	Ramon Romero Jr.	Democrat
91st	Stephanie Klick	Republican	Stephanie Klick	Republican
92nd	Jonathan Stickland	Republican	Jonathan Stickland	Republican
93rd	Matt Krause	Republican	Matt Krause	Republican
94th	Tony Tinderholt	Republican	Tony Tinderholt	Republican
95th	Nicole Collier	Democrat	Nicole Collier	Democrat
96th	Bill Zedler	Republican	Bill Zedler	Republican
97th	Craig Goldman	Republican	Craig Goldman	Republican
98th	Giovanni Capriglione	Republican	Giovanni Capriglione	Republican
99th	Charlie Geren	Republican	Charlie Geren	Republican
100th	Eric Johnson	Democrat	Eric Johnson	Democrat
101st	Chris Turner	Democrat	Chris Turner	Democrat
102nd	Linda Koop	Republican	Ana-Maria Ramos	Democrat
103rd	Rafael Anchia	Democrat	Rafael Anchia	Democrat
104th	Roberto Alonzo	Democrat	Jessica Gonzalez	Democrat
105th	Rodney Anderson	Republican	Thresa Meza	Democrat
106th	Pat Fallon	Republican	Jared Patterson	Republican
107th	Victoria Neave	Democrat	Victoria Neave	Democrat
108th	Morgan Meyer	Republican	Morgan Meyer	Republican
109th	Helen Giddings	Democrat	Carl Sherman	Democrat
110th	Toni Rose	Democrat	Toni Rose	Democrat
111th	Yvonne Davis	Democrat	Yvonne Davis	Democrat
112th	Angie Chen Button	Republican	Angie Chen Button	Republican
113th	Cindy Burkett	Republican	Rhetta Andrews Bowers	Democrat
114th	Jason Villalba	Republican	John Turner	Democrat
115th	Matt Rinaldi	Republican	Julie Johnson	Democrat
116th	Diana Arevalo	Democrat	Trey Martinez Fischer	Democrat
117th	Philip Cortez	Democrat	Philip Cortez	Democrat
118th	Tomas Uresti	Democrat	Leo Pacheco	Democrat
119th	Roland Gutierrez	Democrat	Roland Gutierrez	Democrat
120th	Barbara Gervin-Hawkins	Democrat	Barbara Gervin-Hawkins	Democrat
121st	Joe Straus	Republican	Steve Allison	Republican
122nd	Lyle Larson	Republican	Lyle Larson	Republican
123rd	Diego Bernal	Democrat	Diego Bernal	Democrat
124th	Ina Minjarez	Democrat	Ina Minjarez	Democrat
125th	Justin Rodriguez	Democrat	Justin Rodriguez	Democrat
126th	Kevin Roberts	Republican	E. Sam Harless	Republican
127th	Dan Huberty	Republican	Dan Huberty	Republican
128th	Briscoe Cain	Republican	Briscoe Cain	Republican
129th	Dennis Paul	Republican	Dennis Paul	Republican
130th	Tom Oliverson	Republican	Tom Oliverson	Republican
131st	Alma Allen	Democrat	Alma Allen	Democrat
132nd	Mike Schofield	Republican	Gina Calanni	Democrat
133rd	Jim Murphy	Republican	Jim Murphy	Republican
134th	Sarah Davis	Republican	Sarah Davis	Republican
135th	Gary Elkins	Republican	Jon E. Rosenthal	Democrat
136th	Tony Dale	Republican	John H. Bucy III	Democrat
137th	Gene Wu	Democrat	Gene Wu	Democrat
138th	Dwayne Bohac	Republican	Dwayne Bohac	Republican
139th	Jarvis Johnson	Democrat	Jarvis Johnson	Democrat
140th	Armando Walle	Democrat	Armando Walle	Democrat
141st	Senfronia Thompson	Democrat	Senfronia Thompson	Democrat
142nd	Harold Dutton Jr.	Democrat	Harold Dutton Jr.	Democrat
143rd	Ana Hernandez	Democrat	Ana Hernandez	Democrat
144th	Mary Ann Perez	Democrat	Mary Ann Perez	Democrat
145th	Carol Alvarado	Democrat	Carol Alvarado	Democrat
146th	Shawn Thierry	Democrat	Shawn Thierry	Democrat
147th	Garnet Coleman	Democrat	Garnet Coleman	Democrat
148th	Jessica Farrar	Democrat	Jessica Farrar	Democrat
149th	Hubert Vo	Democrat	Hubert Vo	Democrat
150th	Valoree Swanson	Republican	Valoree Swanson	Republican

== Detailed results ==
=== District 1 ===
Texas House of Representatives district 1 general election, 2018
Party	Candidate	Votes	%
Republican	Gary VanDeaver (incumbent)	43,340	100.0
Total votes		43,340	100.0
Republican hold			

=== District 2 ===
Texas House of Representatives district 2 general election, 2018
Party	Candidate	Votes	%
Republican	Dan Flynn (incumbent)	45,843	80.04
Democratic	Bill Brannon	11,432	19.96
Total votes		57,275	100.0
Republican hold			

=== District 3 ===
Texas House of Representatives district 3 general election, 2018
Party	Candidate	Votes	%
Republican	Cecil Bell Jr. (incumbent)	48,619	76.00
Democratic	Lisa Seger	15,352	24.00
Total votes		63,971	100.0
Republican hold			

=== District 4 ===
Texas House of Representatives district 4 general election, 2018
Party	Candidate	Votes	%
Republican	Keith Bell	44,669	74.10
Democratic	Eston Williams	14,581	24.19
Libertarian	D. Allen Miller	1,029	1.71
Total votes		60,279	100.0
Republican hold			

=== District 5 ===
Texas House of Representatives district 5 general election, 2018
Party	Candidate	Votes	%
Republican	Cole Hefner (incumbent)	44,604	79.35
Democratic	Bill Liebbe	11,610	20.65
Total votes		56,214	100.0
Republican hold			

=== District 6 ===
Texas House of Representatives district 6 general election, 2018
Party	Candidate	Votes	%
Republican	Matt Schaefer (incumbent)	37,172	75.60
Independent	Neal Katz	11,995	24.40
Total votes		49,167	100.0
Republican hold			

=== District 7 ===
Texas House of Representatives district 7 general election, 2018
Party	Candidate	Votes	%
Republican	Jay Dean (incumbent)	39,588	100.0
Total votes		39,588	100.0
Republican hold			

=== District 8 ===
Texas House of Representatives district 8 general election, 2018
Party	Candidate	Votes	%
Republican	Cody Harris	36,535	78.22
Democratic	Wesley Ratcliff	10,171	21.78
Total votes		46,706	100.0
Republican hold			

=== District 9 ===
Texas House of Representatives district 9 general election, 2018
Party	Candidate	Votes	%
Republican	Chris Paddie (incumbent)	45,918	100.0
Total votes		45,918	100.0
Republican hold			

=== District 10 ===
Texas House of Representatives district 10 general election, 2018
Party	Candidate	Votes	%
Republican	John Wray (incumbent)	44,652	70.26
Democratic	Kimberly Emery	17,445	27.45
Libertarian	Matt Savino	1,453	2.29
Total votes		63,550	100.0
Republican hold			

=== District 11 ===
Texas House of Representatives district 11 general election, 2018
Party	Candidate	Votes	%
Republican	Travis Clardy (incumbent)	38,716	74.36
Democratic	Alec Johnson	13,350	25.64
Total votes		52,066	100.0
Republican hold			

=== District 12 ===
Texas House of Representatives district 12 general election, 2018
Party	Candidate	Votes	%
Republican	Kyle Kacal (incumbent)	33,063	67.59
Democratic	Marianne Arnold	15,855	32.41
Total votes		48,918	100.0
Republican hold			

=== District 13 ===
Texas House of Representatives district 13 general election, 2018
Party	Candidate	Votes	%
Republican	Ben Leman (incumbent)	51,126	79.12
Democratic	Cecil R. Webster, Sr.	13,494	20.88
Total votes		64,620	100.0
Republican hold			

=== District 14 ===
Texas House of Representatives district 14 general election, 2018
Party	Candidate	Votes	%
Republican	John N. Raney (incumbent)	26,906	56.38
Democratic	Josh Wilkinson	20,817	43.62
Total votes		47,723	100.0
Republican hold			

=== District 15 ===
Texas House of Representatives district 15 general election, 2018
Party	Candidate	Votes	%
Republican	Steve Toth	52,975	67.15
Democratic	Lorena Perez McGill	25,915	32.85
Total votes		78,890	100.0
Republican hold			

=== District 16 ===
Texas House of Representatives district 16 general election, 2018
Party	Candidate	Votes	%
Republican	Will Metcalf (incumbent)	49,233	80.33
Democratic	Mike Midler	12,059	19.67
Total votes		61,292	100.0
Republican hold			

=== District 17 ===
Texas House of Representatives district 17 general election, 2018
Party	Candidate	Votes	%
Republican	John Cyrier (incumbent)	33,522	62.55
Democratic	Michelle Ryan	20,069	37.45
Total votes		53,591	100.0
Republican hold			

=== District 18 ===
Texas House of Representatives district 18 general election, 2018
Party	Candidate	Votes	%
Republican	Ernest Bailes (incumbent)	35,597	75.49
Democratic	Fred Lemond	11,559	24.51
Total votes		47,156	100.0
Republican hold			

=== District 19 ===
Texas House of Representatives district 19 general election, 2018
Party	Candidate	Votes	%
Republican	James White (incumbent)	50,046	83.19
Democratic	Sherry Williams	10,112	16.81
Total votes		60,158	100.0
Republican hold			

=== District 20 ===
Texas House of Representatives district 20 general election, 2018
Party	Candidate	Votes	%
Republican	Terry Wilson (incumbent)	57,885	71.50
Democratic	Stephen Wyman	23,069	28.50
Total votes		80,954	100.0
Republican hold			

=== District 21 ===
Texas House of Representatives district 21 general election, 2018
Party	Candidate	Votes	%
Republican	Dade Phelan (incumbent)	46,435	100.0
Total votes		46,435	100.0
Republican hold			

=== District 22 ===
Texas House of Representatives district 22 general election, 2018
Party	Candidate	Votes	%
Democratic	Joe Deshotel (incumbent)	31,441	100.0
Total votes		31,441	100.0
Democratic hold			

=== District 23 ===
Texas House of Representatives district 23 general election, 2018
Party	Candidate	Votes	%
Republican	Mayes Middleton	32,951	56.46
Democratic	Amanda Jamrok	24,181	41.43
Libertarian	Lawrence Johnson	1,234	2.11
Total votes		58,366	100.0
Republican hold			

=== District 24 ===
Texas House of Representatives district 24 general election, 2018
Party	Candidate	Votes	%
Republican	Greg Bonnen (incumbent)	48,045	69.59
Democratic	John Phelps	19,586	28.37
Libertarian	Dick Illyes	1,405	2.04
Total votes		69,036	100.0
Republican hold			

=== District 25 ===
Texas House of Representatives district 25 general election, 2018
Party	Candidate	Votes	%
Republican	Dennis Bonnen (incumbent)	40,902	100.0
Total votes		40,902	100.0
Republican hold			

=== District 26 ===
Texas House of Representatives district 26 general election, 2018
Party	Candidate	Votes	%
Republican	Rick Miller (incumbent)	34,504	52.41
Democratic	L. Sarah DeMerchant	31,330	47.59
Total votes		65,834	100.0
Republican hold			

=== District 27 ===
Texas House of Representatives district 27 general election, 2018
Party	Candidate	Votes	%
Democratic	Ron Reynolds (incumbent)	47,450	100.0
Total votes		47,450	100.0
Democratic hold			

=== District 28 ===
Texas House of Representatives district 28 general election, 2018
Party	Candidate	Votes	%
Republican	John M. Zerwas (incumbent)	44,414	54.16
Democratic	Meghan Scoggins	37,584	45.84
Total votes		81,998	100.0
Republican hold			

=== District 29 ===
Texas House of Representatives district 29 general election, 2018
Party	Candidate	Votes	%
Republican	Ed Thompson (incumbent)	46,810	100.0
Total votes		46,810	100.0
Republican hold			

=== District 30 ===
Texas House of Representatives district 30 general election, 2018
Party	Candidate	Votes	%
Republican	Geanie Morrison (incumbent)	39,653	74.70
Democratic	Robin Hayter	13,430	25.30
Total votes		53,083	100.0
Republican hold			

=== District 31 ===
Texas House of Representatives district 31 general election, 2018
Party	Candidate	Votes	%
Democratic	Ryan Guillen (incumbent)	27,492	100.0
Total votes		27,492	100.0
Democratic hold			

=== District 32 ===
Texas House of Representatives district 32 general election, 2018
Party	Candidate	Votes	%
Republican	Todd Ames Hunter (incumbent)	38,359	100.0
Total votes		38,359	100.0
Republican hold			

=== District 33 ===
Texas House of Representatives district 33 general election, 2018
Party	Candidate	Votes	%
Republican	Justin Holland (incumbent)	53,870	65.00
Democratic	Laura Gunn	29,013	35.00
Total votes		82,883	100.0
Republican hold			

=== District 34 ===
Texas House of Representatives district 34 general election, 2018
Party	Candidate	Votes	%
Democratic	Abel Herrero (incumbent)	25,246	61.11
Republican	Chris Hale	16,065	38.89
Total votes		41,311	100.0
Democratic hold			

=== District 35 ===
Texas House of Representatives district 35 general election, 2018
Party	Candidate	Votes	%
Democratic	Oscar Longoria (incumbent)	23,351	100.0
Total votes		23,351	100.0
Democratic hold			

=== District 36 ===
Texas House of Representatives district 36 general election, 2018
Party	Candidate	Votes	%
Democratic	Sergio Muñoz Jr. (incumbent)	25,971	100.0
Total votes		25,971	100.0
Democratic hold			

=== District 37 ===
Texas House of Representatives district 37 general election, 2018
Party	Candidate	Votes	%
Democratic	Alex Dominguez	20,314	100.0
Total votes		20,314	100.0
Democratic hold			

=== District 38 ===
Texas House of Representatives district 38 general election, 2018
Party	Candidate	Votes	%
Democratic	Eddie Lucio III (incumbent)	25,019	100.0
Total votes		25,019	100.0
Democratic hold			

=== District 39 ===
Texas House of Representatives district 39 general election, 2018
Party	Candidate	Votes	%
Democratic	Armando Martinez (incumbent)	25,822	100.0
Total votes		25,822	100.0
Democratic hold			

=== District 40 ===
Texas House of Representatives district 40 general election, 2018
Party	Candidate	Votes	%
Democratic	Terry Canales (incumbent)	24,252	100.0
Total votes		24,252	100.0
Democratic hold			

=== District 41 ===
Texas House of Representatives district 41 general election, 2018
Party	Candidate	Votes	%
Democratic	Robert Guerra (incumbent)	24,804	61.49
Republican	Hilda Garza-DeShazo	15,535	38.51
Total votes		40,339	100.0
Democratic hold			

=== District 42 ===
Texas House of Representatives district 42 general election, 2018
Party	Candidate	Votes	%
Democratic	Richard Raymond (incumbent)	25,392	74.31
Republican	Luis De La Garza	8,778	25.69
Total votes		34,170	100.0
Democratic hold			

=== District 43 ===
Texas House of Representatives district 43 general election, 2018
Party	Candidate	Votes	%
Republican	Jose Manuel Lozano Jr. (incumbent)	26,490	61.12
Democratic	Dee Ann Torres Miller	16,854	38.88
Total votes		43,344	100.0
Republican hold			

=== District 44 ===
Texas House of Representatives district 44 general election, 2018
Party	Candidate	Votes	%
Republican	John Kuempel (incumbent)	48,704	68.64
Democratic	John Rodgers	22,253	31.36
Total votes		70,957	100.0
Republican hold			

=== District 45 ===
Texas House of Representatives district 45 general election, 2018
Party	Candidate	Votes	%
Democratic	Erin Zwiener	43,207	51.60
Republican	Ken Strange	40,531	48.40
Total votes		83,738	100.0
Democratic gain from Republican			

=== District 46 ===
Texas House of Representatives district 46 general election, 2018
Party	Candidate	Votes	%
Democratic	Sheryl Cole	46,893	82.23
Republican	Gabriel Nila	8,525	14.95
Libertarian	Kevin Ludlow	1,608	2.82
Total votes		57,026	100.0
Democratic hold			

=== District 47 ===
Texas House of Representatives district 47 general election, 2018
Party	Candidate	Votes	%
Democratic	Vikki Goodwin	55,307	52.40
Republican	Paul D. Workman (incumbent)	50,244	47.60
Total votes		105,551	100.0
Democratic gain from Republican			

=== District 48 ===
Texas House of Representatives district 48 general election, 2018
Party	Candidate	Votes	%
Democratic	Donna Howard (incumbent)	67,952	100.0
Total votes		67,952	100.0
Democratic hold			

=== District 49 ===
Texas House of Representatives district 49 general election, 2018
Party	Candidate	Votes	%
Democratic	Gina Hinojosa (incumbent)	76,851	83.00
Republican	Kyle Austin	15,736	17.00
Total votes		92,587	100.0
Democratic hold			

=== District 50 ===
Texas House of Representatives district 50 general election, 2018
Party	Candidate	Votes	%
Democratic	Celia Israel (incumbent)	52,652	100.0
Total votes		52,652	100.0
Democratic hold			

=== District 51 ===
Texas House of Representatives district 51 general election, 2018
Party	Candidate	Votes	%
Democratic	Eddie Rodriguez (incumbent)	50,282	100.0
Total votes		50,282	100.0
Democratic hold			

=== District 52 ===
Texas House of Representatives district 52 general election, 2018
Party	Candidate	Votes	%
Democratic	James Talarico	36,798	51.73
Republican	Cynthia Flores	34,340	48.27
Total votes		71,138	100.0
Democratic gain from Republican			

=== District 53 ===
Texas House of Representatives district 53 general election, 2018
Party	Candidate	Votes	%
Republican	Andrew Murr (incumbent)	52,899	78.55
Democratic	Stephanie Lochte Ertel	14,449	21.45
Total votes		67,348	100.0
Republican hold			

=== District 54 ===
Texas House of Representatives district 54 general election, 2018
Party	Candidate	Votes	%
Republican	Brad Buckley	26,037	53.80
Democratic	Kathy Richerson	22,357	46.20
Total votes		48,394	100.0
Republican hold			

=== District 55 ===
Texas House of Representatives district 55 general election, 2018
Party	Candidate	Votes	%
Republican	Hugh Shine (incumbent)	34,297	100.0
Total votes		34,297	100.0
Republican hold			

=== District 56 ===
Texas House of Representatives district 56 general election, 2018
Party	Candidate	Votes	%
Republican	Charles Anderson (incumbent)	37,893	65.78
Democratic	Katherine Turner-Pearson	19,713	34.22
Total votes		57,606	100.0
Republican hold			

=== District 57 ===
Texas House of Representatives district 57 general election, 2018
Party	Candidate	Votes	%
Republican	Trent Ashby (incumbent)	41,158	79.04
Democratic	Jason Rogers	10,912	20.96
Total votes		52,070	100.0
Republican hold			

=== District 58 ===
Texas House of Representatives district 58 general election, 2018
Party	Candidate	Votes	%
Republican	DeWayne Burns (incumbent)	49,255	100.0
Total votes		49,255	100.0
Republican hold			

=== District 59 ===
Texas House of Representatives district 59 general election, 2018
Party	Candidate	Votes	%
Republican	J. D. Sheffield (incumbent)	39,453	100.0
Total votes		39,453	100.0
Republican hold			

=== District 60 ===
Texas House of Representatives district 60 general election, 2018
Party	Candidate	Votes	%
Republican	Mike Lang (incumbent)	56,741	100.0
Total votes		56,741	100.0
Republican hold			

=== District 61 ===
Texas House of Representatives district 61 general election, 2018
Party	Candidate	Votes	%
Republican	Phil King (incumbent)	66,735	100.0
Total votes		66,735	100.0
Republican hold			

=== District 62 ===
Texas House of Representatives district 62 general election, 2018
Party	Candidate	Votes	%
Republican	Reggie Smith	41,994	76.16
Democratic	Valerie Hefner	12,076	21.90
Libertarian	David Schaab	1,072	1.94
Total votes		55,142	100.0
Republican hold			

=== District 63 ===
Texas House of Representatives district 63 general election, 2018
Party	Candidate	Votes	%
Republican	Tan Parker (incumbent)	52,971	67.12
Democratic	Laura Haines	25,944	32.88
Total votes		78,915	100.0
Republican hold			

=== District 64 ===
Texas House of Representatives district 64 general election, 2018
Party	Candidate	Votes	%
Republican	Lynn Stucky (incumbent)	36,239	52.81
Democratic	Andrew Morris	30,535	44.49
Libertarian	Nick Dietrich	1,852	2.70
Total votes		68,626	100.0
Republican hold			

=== District 65 ===
Texas House of Representatives district 65 general election, 2018
Party	Candidate	Votes	%
Democratic	Michelle Beckley	29,972	51.16
Republican	Ron Simmons (incumbent)	28,614	48.84
Total votes		58,586	100.0
Democratic gain from Republican			

=== District 66 ===
Texas House of Representatives district 66 general election, 2018
Party	Candidate	Votes	%
Republican	Matt Shaheen (incumbent)	34,382	50.29
Democratic	Sharon Hirsch	33,991	49.71
Total votes		68,373	100.0
Republican hold			

=== District 67 ===
Texas House of Representatives district 67 general election, 2018
Party	Candidate	Votes	%
Republican	Jeff Leach (incumbent)	37,268	51.15
Democratic	Sarah Depew	35,596	48.85
Total votes		72,864	100.0
Republican hold			

=== District 68 ===
Texas House of Representatives district 68 general election, 2018
Party	Candidate	Votes	%
Republican	Drew Springer Jr. (incumbent)	45,916	100.0
Total votes		45,916	100.0
Republican hold			

=== District 69 ===
Texas House of Representatives district 69 general election, 2018
Party	Candidate	Votes	%
Republican	James Frank (incumbent)	36,068	100.0
Total votes		36,068	100.0
Republican hold			

=== District 70 ===
Texas House of Representatives district 70 general election, 2018
Party	Candidate	Votes	%
Republican	Scott Sanford (incumbent)	52,526	61.75
Democratic	Julie Luton	32,543	38.25
Total votes		85,069	100.0
Republican hold			

=== District 71 ===
Texas House of Representatives district 71 general election, 2018
Party	Candidate	Votes	%
Republican	Stan Lambert (incumbent)	38,511	78.05
Democratic	Sam Hatton	10,828	21.95
Total votes		49,339	100.0
Republican hold			

=== District 72 ===
Texas House of Representatives district 72 general election, 2018
Party	Candidate	Votes	%
Republican	Drew Darby (incumbent)	41,480	100.0
Total votes		41,480	100.0
Republican hold			

=== District 73 ===
Texas House of Representatives district 73 general election, 2018
Party	Candidate	Votes	%
Republican	Kyle Biedermann (incumbent)	69,203	74.78
Democratic	Stephanie Phillips	23,333	25.22
Total votes		92,536	100.0
Republican hold			

=== District 74 ===
Texas House of Representatives district 74 general election, 2018
Party	Candidate	Votes	%
Democratic	Poncho Nevárez (incumbent)	25,439	100.0
Total votes		25,439	100.0
Democratic hold			

=== District 75 ===
Texas House of Representatives district 75 general election, 2018
Party	Candidate	Votes	%
Democratic	Mary González (incumbent)	30,201	100.0
Total votes		30,201	100.0
Democratic hold			

=== District 76 ===
Texas House of Representatives district 76 general election, 2018
Party	Candidate	Votes	%
Democratic	Cesar Blanco (incumbent)	29,445	100.0
Total votes		29,445	100.0
Democratic hold			

=== District 77 ===
Texas House of Representatives district 77 general election, 2018
Party	Candidate	Votes	%
Democratic	Evelina Ortega (incumbent)	27,685	100.0
Total votes		27,685	100.0
Democratic hold			

=== District 78 ===
Texas House of Representatives district 78 general election, 2018
Party	Candidate	Votes	%
Democratic	Joe Moody (incumbent)	31,882	65.24
Republican	Jeffrey Lane	16,987	34.76
Total votes		48,869	100.0
Democratic hold			

=== District 79 ===
Texas House of Representatives district 79 general election, 2018
Party	Candidate	Votes	%
Democratic	Joe Pickett (incumbent)	33,015	100.0
Total votes		33,015	100.0
Democratic hold			

=== District 80 ===
Texas House of Representatives district 80 general election, 2018
Party	Candidate	Votes	%
Democratic	Tracy King (incumbent)	27,781	100.0
Total votes		27,781	100.0
Democratic hold			

=== District 81 ===
Texas House of Representatives district 81 general election, 2018
Party	Candidate	Votes	%
Republican	Brooks Landgraf (incumbent)	29,063	74.99
Democratic	Armando Gamboa	9,692	25.01
Total votes		38,755	100.0
Republican hold			

=== District 82 ===
Texas House of Representatives district 82 general election, 2018
Party	Candidate	Votes	%
Republican	Tom Craddick (incumbent)	39,030	80.13
Democratic	Spencer Bounds	9,677	19.87
Total votes		48,707	100.0
Republican hold			

=== District 83 ===
Texas House of Representatives district 83 general election, 2018
Party	Candidate	Votes	%
Republican	Dustin Burrows (incumbent)	45,379	77.32
Democratic	Drew Landry	13,309	22.68
Total votes		58,688	100.0
Republican hold			

=== District 84 ===
Texas House of Representatives district 84 general election, 2018
Party	Candidate	Votes	%
Republican	John Frullo (incumbent)	27,528	60.15
Democratic	Samantha Carrillo Fields	18,237	39.85
Total votes		45,765	100.0
Republican hold			

=== District 85 ===
Texas House of Representatives district 85 general election, 2018
Party	Candidate	Votes	%
Republican	Phil Stephenson (incumbent)	32,019	56.48
Democratic	Jennifer Cantu	24,668	43.52
Total votes		56,687	100.0
Republican hold			

=== District 86 ===
Texas House of Representatives district 86 general election, 2018
Party	Candidate	Votes	%
Republican	John Smithee (incumbent)	46,991	82.13
Democratic	Mike Purcell	10,221	17.87
Total votes		57,212	100.0
Republican hold			

=== District 87 ===
Texas House of Representatives district 87 general election, 2018
Party	Candidate	Votes	%
Republican	Four Price (incumbent)	32,314	100.0
Total votes		32,314	100.0
Republican hold			

=== District 88 ===
Texas House of Representatives district 88 general election, 2018
Party	Candidate	Votes	%
Republican	Ken King (incumbent)	33,425	83.75
Democratic	Ezekiel Barron	6,486	16.25
Total votes		39,911	100.0
Republican hold			

=== District 89 ===
Texas House of Representatives district 89 general election, 2018
Party	Candidate	Votes	%
Republican	Candy Noble	44,445	59.54
Democratic	Ray Ash	30,203	40.46
Total votes		74,648	100.0
Republican hold			

=== District 90 ===
Texas House of Representatives district 90 general election, 2018
Party	Candidate	Votes	%
Democratic	Ramon Romero Jr. (incumbent)	20,728	100.0
Total votes		20,728	100.0
Democratic hold			

=== District 91 ===
Texas House of Representatives district 91 general election, 2018
Party	Candidate	Votes	%
Republican	Stephanie Klick (incumbent)	34,606	63.48
Democratic	Jeromey Sims	19,905	36.52
Total votes		54,511	100.0
Republican hold			

=== District 92 ===
Texas House of Representatives district 92 general election, 2018
Party	Candidate	Votes	%
Republican	Jonathan Stickland (incumbent)	29,755	49.82
Democratic	Steve Riddell	28,327	47.43
Libertarian	Eric Espinoza	1,644	2.75
Total votes		59,726	100.0
Republican hold			

=== District 93 ===
Texas House of Representatives district 93 general election, 2018
Party	Candidate	Votes	%
Republican	Matt Krause (incumbent)	30,878	53.87
Democratic	Nancy Bean	26,445	46.13
Total votes		57,323	100.0
Republican hold			

=== District 94 ===
Texas House of Representatives district 94 general election, 2018
Party	Candidate	Votes	%
Republican	Tony Tinderholt (incumbent)	32,448	52.49
Democratic	Finnigan Jones	27,145	43.91
Libertarian	Jessica Pallett	2,230	3.61
Total votes		61,823	100.0
Republican hold			

=== District 95 ===
Texas House of Representatives district 95 general election, 2018
Party	Candidate	Votes	%
Democratic	Nicole Collier (incumbent)	33,022	76.51
Republican	Stephen West	9,399	21.78
Libertarian	Joshua Burns	737	1.71
Total votes		43,158	100.0
Democratic hold			

=== District 96 ===
Texas House of Representatives district 96 general election, 2018
Party	Candidate	Votes	%
Republican	Bill Zedler (incumbent)	32,698	50.84
Democratic	Ryan Ray	30,360	47.21
Libertarian	Stephen Parmer	1,256	1.95
Total votes		64,314	100.0
Republican hold			

=== District 97 ===
Texas House of Representatives district 97 general election, 2018
Party	Candidate	Votes	%
Republican	Craig Goldman (incumbent)	35,171	53.19
Democratic	Beth Llewellyn McLaughlin	29,665	44.86
Libertarian	Rod Wingo	1,289	1.95
Total votes		66,125	100.0
Republican hold			

=== District 98 ===
Texas House of Representatives district 98 general election, 2018
Party	Candidate	Votes	%
Republican	Giovanni Capriglione (incumbent)	56,793	68.25
Democratic	Mica Ringo	24,417	29.34
Libertarian	H. Todd Moore	2,007	2.41
Total votes		83,217	100.0
Republican hold			

=== District 99 ===
Texas House of Representatives district 99 general election, 2018
Party	Candidate	Votes	%
Republican	Charlie Geren (incumbent)	38,048	64.31
Democratic	Michael Stackhouse	21,111	35.69
Total votes		59,159	100.0
Republican hold			

=== District 100 ===
Texas House of Representatives district 100 general election, 2018
Party	Candidate	Votes	%
Democratic	Eric Johnson (incumbent)	33,933	100.0
Total votes		33,933	100.0
Democratic hold			

=== District 101 ===
Texas House of Representatives district 101 general election, 2018
Party	Candidate	Votes	%
Democratic	Chris Turner (incumbent)	31,127	87.39
Libertarian	James Allen	4,490	12.61
Total votes		35,617	100.0
Democratic hold			

=== District 102 ===
Texas House of Representatives district 102 general election, 2018
Party	Candidate	Votes	%
Democratic	Ana-Maria Ramos	30,025	52.88
Republican	Linda Koop (incumbent)	26,758	47.12
Total votes		56,783	100.0
Democratic gain from Republican			

=== District 103 ===
Texas House of Representatives district 103 general election, 2018
Party	Candidate	Votes	%
Democratic	Rafael Anchia (incumbent)	29,936	78.25
Republican	Jerry Fortenberry	8,322	21.75
Total votes		38,258	100.0
Democratic hold			

=== District 104 ===
Texas House of Representatives district 104 general election, 2018
Party	Candidate	Votes	%
Democratic	Jessica Gonzalez	26,078	100.0
Total votes		26,078	100.0
Democratic hold			

=== District 105 ===
Texas House of Representatives district 105 general election, 2018
Party	Candidate	Votes	%
Democratic	Thresa "Terry" Meza	24,579	54.74
Republican	Rodney Anderson (incumbent)	20,324	45.26
Total votes		44,903	100.0
Democratic gain from Republican			

=== District 106 ===
Texas House of Representatives district 106 general election, 2018
Party	Candidate	Votes	%
Republican	Jared Patterson	48,460	58.31
Democratic	Ramona Thompson	34,651	41.69
Total votes		83,111	100.0
Republican hold			

=== District 107 ===
Texas House of Representatives district 107 general election, 2018
Party	Candidate	Votes	%
Democratic	Victoria Neave (incumbent)	29,058	57.10
Republican	Deanna Maria Metzger	21,829	42.90
Total votes		50,887	100.0
Democratic hold			

=== District 108 ===
Texas House of Representatives district 108 general election, 2018
Party	Candidate	Votes	%
Republican	Morgan Meyer (incumbent)	39,427	50.14
Democratic	Joanna Cattanach	39,207	49.86
Total votes		78,634	100.0
Republican hold			

=== District 109 ===
Texas House of Representatives district 109 general election, 2018
Party	Candidate	Votes	%
Democratic	Carl Sherman, Sr.	51,975	99.00
Independent	Casey Littlejohn (write-in)	524	1.00
Total votes		52,499	100.0
Democratic hold			

=== District 110 ===
Texas House of Representatives district 110 general election, 2018
Party	Candidate	Votes	%
Democratic	Toni Rose (incumbent)	27,300	100.0
Total votes		27,300	100.0
Democratic hold			

=== District 111 ===
Texas House of Representatives district 111 general election, 2018
Party	Candidate	Votes	%
Democratic	Yvonne Davis (incumbent)	44,377	100.0
Total votes		44,377	100.0
Democratic hold			

=== District 112 ===
Texas House of Representatives district 112 general election, 2018
Party	Candidate	Votes	%
Republican	Angie Chen Button (incumbent)	27,126	51.04
Democratic	Brandy Chambers	26,016	48.96
Total votes		53,142	100.0
Republican hold			

=== District 113 ===
Texas House of Representatives district 113 general election, 2018
Party	Candidate	Votes	%
Democratic	Rhetta Andrews Bowers	28,170	53.48
Republican	Jonathan Boos	24,500	46.52
Total votes		52,670	100.0
Democratic gain from Republican			

=== District 114 ===
Texas House of Representatives district 114 general election, 2018
Party	Candidate	Votes	%
Democratic	John Turner	37,020	55.65
Republican	Lisa Luby Ryan	29,508	44.35
Total votes		66,528	100.0
Democratic gain from Republican			

=== District 115 ===
Texas House of Representatives district 115 general election, 2018
Party	Candidate	Votes	%
Democratic	Julie Johnson	32,214	56.79
Republican	Matt Rinaldi (incumbent)	24,512	43.21
Total votes		56,726	100.0
Democratic gain from Republican			

=== District 116 ===
Texas House of Representatives district 116 general election, 2018
Party	Candidate	Votes	%
Democratic	Trey Martinez Fischer	32,538	70.40
Republican	Fernando Padron	13,680	29.60
Total votes		46,218	100.0
Democratic hold			

=== District 117 ===
Texas House of Representatives district 117 general election, 2018
Party	Candidate	Votes	%
Democratic	Philip Cortez (incumbent)	32,976	57.39
Republican	Michael Berlanga	24,480	42.61
Total votes		57,456	100.0
Democratic hold			

=== District 118 ===
Texas House of Representatives district 118 general election, 2018
Party	Candidate	Votes	%
Democratic	Leo Pacheco	24,032	58.05
Republican	John Lujan	17,367	41.95
Total votes		41,399	100.0
Democratic hold			

=== District 119 ===
Texas House of Representatives district 119 general election, 2018
Party	Candidate	Votes	%
Democratic	Roland Gutierrez (incumbent)	30,331	100.0
Total votes		30,331	100.0
Democratic hold			

=== District 120 ===
Texas House of Representatives district 120 general election, 2018
Party	Candidate	Votes	%
Democratic	Barbara Gervin-Hawkins (incumbent)	28,864	68.37
Republican	Ronald Payne	13,354	31.63
Total votes		42,218	100.0
Democratic hold			

=== District 121 ===
Texas House of Representatives district 121 general election, 2018
Party	Candidate	Votes	%
Republican	Steve Allison	38,843	53.17
Democratic	Celina Montoya	32,679	44.73
Libertarian	Mallory Olfers	1,529	2.09
Total votes		73,051	100.0
Republican hold			

=== District 122 ===
Texas House of Representatives district 122 general election, 2018
Party	Candidate	Votes	%
Republican	Lyle Larson (incumbent)	58,311	61.93
Democratic	Claire Barnett	35,851	38.07
Total votes		94,162	100.0
Republican hold			

=== District 123 ===
Texas House of Representatives district 123 general election, 2018
Party	Candidate	Votes	%
Democratic	Diego Bernal (incumbent)	36,851	100.0
Total votes		36,851	100.0
Democratic hold			

=== District 124 ===
Texas House of Representatives district 124 general election, 2018
Party	Candidate	Votes	%
Democratic	Ina Minjarez (incumbent)	31,835	67.64
Republican	Johnny Arredondo	15,229	32.36
Total votes		47,064	100.0
Democratic hold			

=== District 125 ===
Texas House of Representatives district 125 general election, 2018
Party	Candidate	Votes	%
Democratic	Justin Rodriguez (incumbent)	32,953	81.38
Libertarian	Eric Pina	7,541	18.62
Total votes		40,494	100.0
Democratic hold			

=== District 126 ===
Texas House of Representatives district 126 general election, 2018
Party	Candidate	Votes	%
Republican	E. Sam Harless	30,399	54.84
Democratic	Natali Hurtado	25,035	45.16
Total votes		55,434	100.0
Republican hold			

=== District 127 ===
Texas House of Representatives district 127 general election, 2018
Party	Candidate	Votes	%
Republican	Dan Huberty (incumbent)	44,595	80.24
Libertarian	Ryan Woods	10,981	19.76
Total votes		55,576	100.0
Republican hold			

=== District 128 ===
Texas House of Representatives district 128 general election, 2018
Party	Candidate	Votes	%
Republican	Briscoe Cain (incumbent)	38,197	100.0
Total votes		38,197	100.0
Republican hold			

=== District 129 ===
Texas House of Representatives district 129 general election, 2018
Party	Candidate	Votes	%
Republican	Dennis Paul (incumbent)	36,554	56.51
Democratic	Alexander Jonathan Karjeker	27,054	41.82
Libertarian	Joseph Majsterski	1,076	1.66
Total votes		64,684	100.0
Republican hold			

=== District 130 ===
Texas House of Representatives district 130 general election, 2018
Party	Candidate	Votes	%
Republican	Tom Oliverson (incumbent)	52,106	68.44
Democratic	Fred Infortunio	22,598	29.68
Libertarian	Roy Eriksen	1,428	1.88
Total votes		76,132	100.0
Republican hold			

=== District 131 ===
Texas House of Representatives district 131 general election, 2018
Party	Candidate	Votes	%
Democratic	Alma Allen (incumbent)	35,930	85.81
Republican	Syed Ali	5,940	14.19
Total votes		41,870	100.0
Democratic hold			

=== District 132 ===
Texas House of Representatives district 132 general election, 2018
Party	Candidate	Votes	%
Democratic	Gina Calanni	32,841	49.26
Republican	Mike Schofield (incumbent)	32,728	49.09
Libertarian	Daniel Arevalo	1,106	1.66
Total votes		66,675	100.0
Democratic gain from Republican			

=== District 133 ===
Texas House of Representatives district 133 general election, 2018
Party	Candidate	Votes	%
Republican	Jim Murphy (incumbent)	41,400	58.11
Democratic	Martin Schexnayder	29,844	41.89
Total votes		71,244	100.0
Republican hold			

=== District 134 ===
Texas House of Representatives district 134 general election, 2018
Party	Candidate	Votes	%
Republican	Sarah Davis (incumbent)	47,277	53.17
Democratic	Allison Sawyer	41,637	46.83
Total votes		88,914	100.0
Republican hold			

=== District 135 ===
Texas House of Representatives district 135 general election, 2018
Party	Candidate	Votes	%
Democratic	Jon Rosenthal	28,473	50.81
Republican	Gary Elkins (incumbent)	26,701	47.65
Libertarian	Paul Bilyeu	867	1.55
Total votes		56,041	100.0
Democratic gain from Republican			

=== District 136 ===
Texas House of Representatives district 136 general election, 2018
Party	Candidate	Votes	%
Democratic	John Bucy III	41,592	53.37
Republican	Tony Dale (incumbent)	34,084	43.73
Libertarian	Zach Parks	2,258	2.90
Total votes		77,934	100.0
Democratic gain from Republican			

=== District 137 ===
Texas House of Representatives district 137 general election, 2018
Party	Candidate	Votes	%
Democratic	Gene Wu (incumbent)	17,616	88.28
Libertarian	Lee Sharp	2,338	11.72
Total votes		19,954	100.0
Democratic hold			

=== District 138 ===
Texas House of Representatives district 138 general election, 2018
Party	Candidate	Votes	%
Republican	Dwayne Bohac (incumbent)	24,222	50.03
Democratic	Adam Milasincic	24,175	49.93
Independent	Demetrius Walker (write-in)	20	0.04
Total votes		48,417	100.0
Republican hold			

=== District 139 ===
Texas House of Representatives district 139 general election, 2018
Party	Candidate	Votes	%
Democratic	Jarvis Johnson (incumbent)	37,159	92.79
Libertarian	Shohn Trojacek	2,887	7.21
Total votes		40,046	100.0
Democratic hold			

=== District 140 ===
Texas House of Representatives district 140 general election, 2018
Party	Candidate	Votes	%
Democratic	Armando Walle (incumbent)	19,188	100.0
Total votes		19,188	100.0
Democratic hold			

=== District 141 ===
Texas House of Representatives district 141 general election, 2018
Party	Candidate	Votes	%
Democratic	Senfronia Thompson (incumbent)	27,946	100.0
Total votes		27,946	100.0
Democratic hold			

=== District 142 ===
Texas House of Representatives district 142 general election, 2018
Party	Candidate	Votes	%
Democratic	Harold Dutton Jr. (incumbent)	32,087	100.0
Total votes		32,087	100.0
Democratic hold			

=== District 143 ===
Texas House of Representatives district 143 general election, 2018
Party	Candidate	Votes	%
Democratic	Ana Hernandez (incumbent)	22,504	100.0
Total votes		22,504	100.0
Democratic hold			

=== District 144 ===
Texas House of Representatives district 144 general election, 2018
Party	Candidate	Votes	%
Democratic	Mary Ann Perez (incumbent)	14,349	61.18
Republican	Ruben Villarreal	9,106	38.82
Total votes		23,455	100.0
Democratic hold			

=== District 145 ===
Texas House of Representatives district 145 general election, 2018
Party	Candidate	Votes	%
Democratic	Carol Alvarado (incumbent)	24,269	90.36
Libertarian	Clayton Hunt	2,590	9.64
Total votes		26,859	100.0
Democratic hold			

=== District 146 ===
Texas House of Representatives district 146 general election, 2018
Party	Candidate	Votes	%
Democratic	Shawn Thierry (incumbent)	35,656	92.89
Libertarian	J. J. Campbell	2,731	7.11
Total votes		38,387	100.0
Democratic hold			

=== District 147 ===
Texas House of Representatives district 147 general election, 2018
Party	Candidate	Votes	%
Democratic	Garnet Coleman (incumbent)	44,314	80.80
Republican	Thomas Wang	10,528	19.20
Total votes		54,842	100.0
Democratic hold			

=== District 148 ===
Texas House of Representatives district 148 general election, 2018
Party	Candidate	Votes	%
Democratic	Jessica Farrar (incumbent)	32,231	67.91
Republican	Ryan McConnico	15,228	32.09
Total votes		47,459	100.0
Democratic hold			

=== District 149 ===
Texas House of Representatives district 149 general election, 2018
Party	Candidate	Votes	%
Democratic	Hubert Vo (incumbent)	27,071	88.32
Libertarian	Aaron Close	3,581	11.68
Total votes		30,652	100.0
Democratic hold			

=== District 150 ===
Texas House of Representatives district 150 general election, 2018
Party	Candidate	Votes	%
Republican	Valoree Swanson (incumbent)	40,907	57.78
Democratic	Michael Shawn Kelly	29,888	42.22
Total votes		70,795	100.0
Republican hold			

== See also ==
- United States elections, 2018
- United States state legislative elections, 2018
- United States Senate election in Texas, 2018
- United States House of Representatives elections in Texas, 2018
- Texas gubernatorial election, 2018
- Texas State Senate election, 2018
- Texas elections, 2018
- Supreme Court of Texas elections for Place 2, Place 4, and Place 6
