= 2010 Texas House of Representatives election =

- November 2, 2010

All 150 seats in the Texas House of Representatives 76 seats needed for a majority
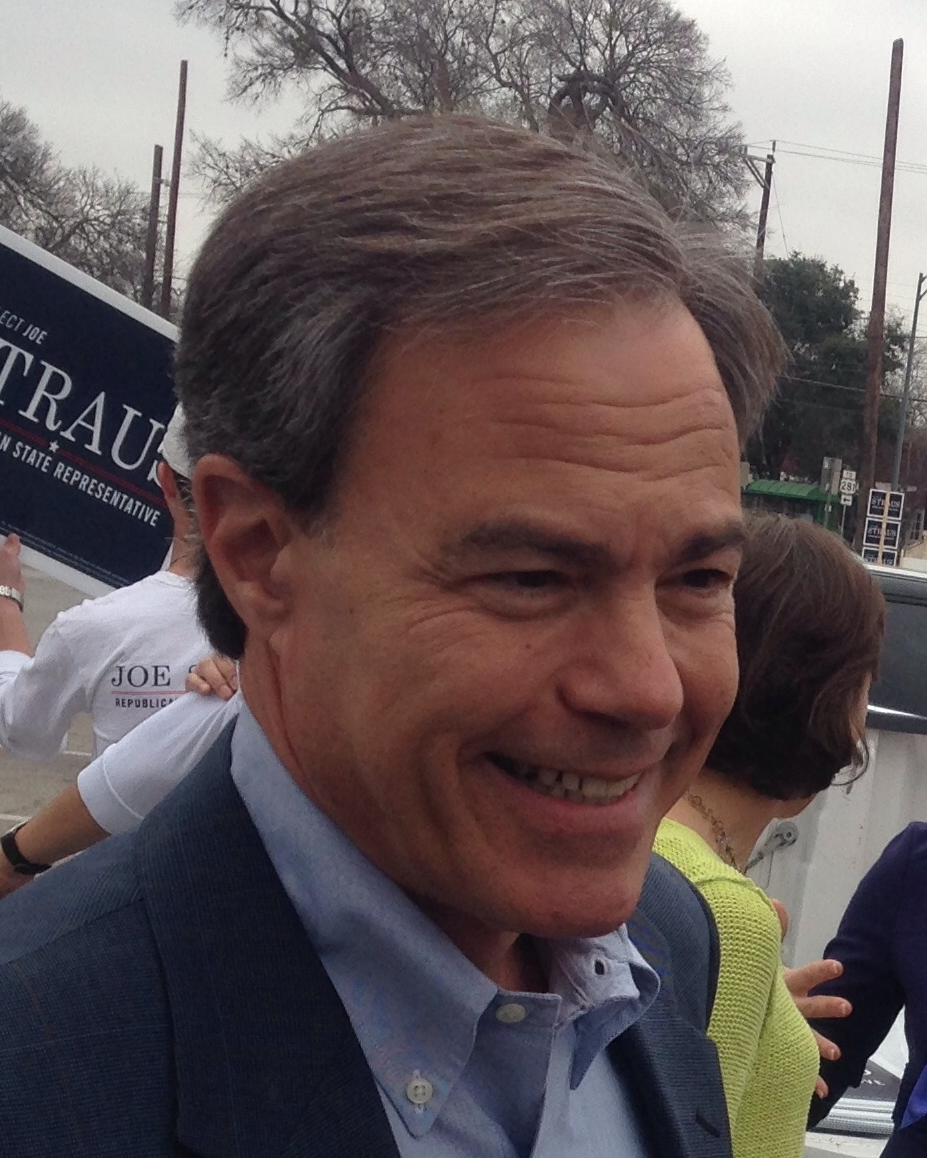

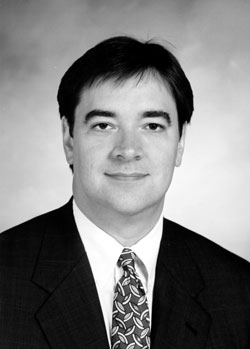
	Majority party	Minority party
Leader	Joe Straus	Jim Dunnam (Lost re-election)
Party	Republican	Democratic
Leader since	January 13, 2009	January 14, 2003
Leader's seat	121st	57th
Last election	76	74
Seats before	77	73
Seats won	99	51
Seat change	▲22	▼22
Popular vote	2,795,975	1,357,943
Percentage	64.71%	31.43%
Swing	▲10.72%	▼10.39%
- Republican hold Republican gain Democratic hold Republican: 40–50% 50–60% 60–70% 70–80% 80–90% ≥90% Democratic: 40–50% 50–60% 60–70% 70–80% 80–90% ≥90%

The 2010 Texas House of Representatives elections took place as part of the biennial United States elections. Texas voters elected state senators in all 150 State House of Representatives districts. The winners of this election served in the 82nd Texas Legislature. State representatives serve for two-year terms.

== Background ==
Following the 2008 elections, the Democrats nearly gained control of the House with 74 members to the Republicans' 76. Republicans saw the freshmen Democratic members elected in 2008 as vulnerable, as many of them had narrowly won and had been the first Democrats elected to those districts in decades. Democrats also had a large number of incumbents in districts that voted heavily Republican on the national level. In November 2009, Democrat Chuck Hopson announced he had switched his party affiliation to Republican, increasing the size of the Republican caucus to 77. Hopson's district was the most Republican district in the state that had elected a Democrat in 2008. Democrats needed to gain three seats from the Republicans in order to win the majority.

== Campaign ==
Republicans very heavily targeted White Democrats representing rural districts that voted for John McCain in the 2008 presidential election. These conservative Democrats attempted to distance themselves from the national Democratic Party as pundits increasingly predicted a Republican wave election in opposition to the policies of President Barack Obama.

== Predictions ==
Most analysts expected Republicans to easily maintain control of the Texas House, expanding their narrow majority from the 2008 election. Despite this, many also saw the potentially strong performance by Democrat Bill White in the concurrent gubernatorial election as a force to mitigate the severity of Democratic losses.

Source	Ranking	As of
Governing	Likely R	Nov. 1, 2010

== Results ==
In the end, the Republicans routed the Democrats in the general election, erasing all of the gains they had made in 2006 and 2008, as well as defeating almost every Democrat representing a rural, Republican-leaning district. Democrats lost 22 seats in the midst of a nationwide Republican wave election. On December 14, 2010, Democrat Allan Ritter announced he would be changing his party affiliation to Republican. On the same day, Democrat Aaron Peña announced he would be switching to the Republican Party as well, claiming that the Democratic Party no longer aligned with his conservative values. This left the party balance at 101 Republicans and 49 Democrats at the start of the Eighty-second Texas Legislature when it convened on January 11, 2011.

=== Statewide ===
Summary of the November 2, 2010 Texas House of Representatives election results
Party	Candi- dates	Votes	%	Seats	+/–
Republican Party	112	2,795,975	64.71%	99	▲22
Democratic Party	93	1,357,943	31.43%	51	▼22
Libertarian Party	50	155,144	3.59%	0	–
Green Party	2	1,848	0.04%	0	–
Independent	2	9,473	0.22%	0	–
Write-in	1	357	0.01%	0	–
Total			100.00%	150	–

Popular vote
Republican	64.71%
Democratic	31.43%
Libertarian	3.59%
Green	0.04%
Independent	0.22%
Write-in	0.01%

House seats won
Republican	66.67%
Democratic	33.33%

=== Close races ===
Seats where the margin of victory was under 10%:

1. District 48, 0.02%
2. District 106, 0.94% (gain)
3. District 134, 1.36% (gain)
4. District 93, 1.69% (gain)
5. District 47, 3.49% (gain)
6. District 101, 3.62% (gain)
7. District 117, 3.78% (gain)
8. District 149, 4.76%
9. District 96, 4.78% (gain)
10. District 78, 4.82% (gain)
11. District 107, 4.89% (gain)
12. District 33, 5.02% (gain)
13. District 35, 5.62% (gain)
14. District 57, 5.92% (gain)
15. District 23, 6.32%
16. District 105, 6.81%
17. District 45, 7.82% (gain)
18. District 34, 7.92% (gain)
19. District 102, 9.28% (gain)
20. District 74, 9.64%

=== Notable races ===
District 11: Representative Chuck Hopson (D-Jacksonville) was re-elected as a Democrat in 2008 with 49.29% of the vote. On November 6, 2009, he announced that he would switch parties and seek re-election as a Republican. He would later win re-election in 2010 with 75.82% of the vote.

=== Results by district ===
District	Democratic		Republican		Others		Total		Result
District	Votes	%	Votes	%	Votes	%	Votes	%	Result
District 1	14,717	40.81%	18,575	51.51%	2,766	7.67%	36,058	100.00%	Republican gain
District 2	-	-	26,604	100.00%	-	-	26,604	100.00%	Republican hold
District 3	14,645	41.51%	19,974	56.61%	665	1.88%	35,284	100.00%	Republican gain
District 4	-	-	14,904	100.00%	-	-	14,904	100.00%	Republican hold
District 5	-	-	33,980	100.00%	-	-	33,980	100.00%	Republican hold
District 6	-	-	30,610	86.85%	4,634	13.15%	35,244	100.00%	Republican hold
District 7	-	-	27,069	91.27%	2,589	8.73%	29,658	100.00%	Republican hold
District 8	7,906	25.61%	22,969	74.39%	-	-	30,875	100.00%	Republican hold
District 9	9,169	27.85%	23,754	72.15%	-	-	32,923	100.00%	Republican hold
District 10	-	-	31,797	100.00%	-	-	31,797	100.00%	Republican hold
District 11	8,635	24.18%	27,074	75.82%	-	-	35,709	100.00%	Republican hold
District 12	15,405	42.36%	20,958	57.64%	-	-	36,363	100.00%	Republican gain
District 13	-	-	31,741	100.00%	-	-	31,741	100.00%	Republican hold
District 14	-	-	27,938	100.00%	-	-	27,938	100.00%	Republican hold
District 15	-	-	52,550	90.45%	5,546	9.55%	58,096	100.00%	Republican hold
District 16	-	-	38,959	100.00%	-	-	38,959	100.00%	Republican hold
District 17	13,868	31.94%	28,266	65.09%	1,291	2.97%	43,425	100.00%	Republican hold
District 18	-	-	26,862	89.57%	3,128	10.43%	29,990	100.00%	Republican hold
District 19	-	-	28,261	100.00%	-	-	28,261	100.00%	Republican hold
District 20	-	-	44,901	82.55%	9,490	17.45%	54,391	100.00%	Republican hold
District 21	19,432	100.00%	-	-	-	-	19,432	100.00%	Democratic hold
District 22	16,552	100.00%	-	-	-	-	16,552	100.00%	Democratic hold
District 23	17,631	53.16%	15,534	46.84%	-	-	33,165	100.00%	Democratic hold
District 24	-	-	39,193	88.71%	4,989	11.29%	44,182	100.00%	Republican hold
District 25	-	-	25,368	100.00%	-	-	25,368	100.00%	Republican hold
District 26	15,344	33.37%	29,721	64.63%	922	2.00%	45,987	100.00%	Republican hold
District 27	32,030	84.64%	-	-	5,812	15.36%	37,842	100.00%	Democratic hold
District 28	17,628	28.56%	44,094	71.44%			61,722	100.00%	Republican hold
District 29	-	-	33,011	84.69%	5,969	15.31%	38,980	100.00%	Republican hold
District 30	-	-	29,045	100.00%	-	-	29,045	100.00%	Republican hold
District 31	12,724	100.00%	-	-	-	-	12,724	100.00%	Democratic hold
District 32	-	-	28,215	100.00%	-	-	28,215	100.00%	Republican hold
District 33	11,306	47.49%	12,499	52.51%	-	-	23,805	100.00%	Republican gain
District 34	11,855	46.04%	13,892	53.96%	-	-	25,747	100.00%	Republican gain
District 35	13,692	47.19%	15,324	52.81%	-	-	29,016	100.00%	Republican gain
District 36	-	-	-	-	-	-	-	100.00%	Democratic hold
District 37	9,640	100.00%	-	-	-	-	9,640	100.00%	Democratic hold
District 38	12,466	100.00%	-	-	-	-	12,466	100.00%	Democratic hold
District 39	-	-	-	-	-	-	-	100.00%	Democratic hold
District 40	-	-	-	-	-	-	-	100.00%	Democratic hold
District 41	10,612	56.98%	8,012	43.02%	-	-	18,624	100.00%	Democratic hold
District 42	18,798	100.00%	-	-	-	-	18,798	100.00%	Democratic hold
District 43	12,351	77.90%	-	-	3,503	22.10%	15,854	100.00%	Democratic hold
District 44	-	-	37,037	100.00%	-	-	37,037	100.00%	Republican hold
District 45	23,691	46.09%	27,715	53.91%	-	-	51,406	100.00%	Republican gain
District 46	18,430	84.19%	-	-	3,462	15.81%	21,892	100.00%	Democratic hold
District 47	27,773	46.19%	29,873	49.68%	2,485	4.13%	60,131	100.00%	Republican gain
District 48	25,023	48.54%	25,011	48.52%	1,519	2.95%	51,553	100.00%	Democratic hold
District 49	30,423	85.29%	-	-	5,249	14.71%	35,672	100.00%	Democratic hold
District 50	23,720	54.85%	18,041	41.72%	1,486	3.44%	43,247	100.00%	Democratic hold
District 51	12,981	75.94%	3,412	19.96%	701	4.10%	17,094	100.00%	Democratic hold
District 52	16,823	38.01%	25,430	57.45%	2,012	4.55%	44,265	100.00%	Republican gain
District 53	-	-	36,424	89.90%	4,093	10.10%	40,517	100.00%	Republican hold
District 54	-	-	22,111	100.00%	-	-	22,111	100.00%	Republican hold
District 55	-	-	24,041	81.11%	5,600	18.89%	29,641	100.00%	Republican hold
District 56	16,554	37.88%	25,554	58.48%	15,91	3.64%	43,669	100.00%	Republican hold
District 57	12,743	45.76%	14,391	51.68%	712	2.56%	27,846	100.00%	Republican gain
District 58	7,408	20.37%	27,537	75.73%	1,418	3.90%	36,363	100.00%	Republican hold
District 59	-	-	19,985	74.87%	6,707	25.13%	26,692	100.00%	Republican hold
District 60	-	-	33,425	100.00%	-	-	33,425	100.00%	Republican hold
District 61	-	-	34,513	86.24%	5,508	13.76%	40,021	100.00%	Republican hold
District 62	-	-	26,133	87.72%	3,657	12.28%	29,790	100.00%	Republican hold
District 63	-	-	43,477	100.00%	-	-	43,477	100.00%	Republican hold
District 64	-	-	26,057	80.72%	6,224	19.28%	32,281	100.00%	Republican hold
District 65	-	-	27,585	82.43%	5,878	17.57%	33,463	100.00%	Republican hold
District 66	-	-	25,279	100.00%	-	-	25,279	100.00%	Republican hold
District 67	-	-	19,070	100.00%	-	-	19,070	100.00%	Republican hold
District 68	-	-	29,140	100.00%	-	-	29,140	100.00%	Republican hold
District 69	7,268	25.83%	20,872	74.17%	-	-	28,140	100.00%	Republican gain
District 70	-	-	43,006	100.00%	-	-	43,006	100.00%	Republican hold
District 71	-	-	24,467	88.07%	3,313	11.93%	27,780	100.00%	Republican hold
District 72	-	-	23,933	100.00%	-	-	23,933	100.00%	Republican hold
District 73	-	-	49,846	85.51%	8,446	14.49%	58,282	100.00%	Republican hold
District 74	15,720	54.82%	12,957	45.18%	-	-	28,677	100.00%	Democratic hold
District 75	11,545	100.00%	-	-	-	-	11,545	100.00%	Democratic hold
District 76	11,318	100.00%	-	-	-	-	11,318	100.00%	Democratic hold
District 77	9,508	100.00%	-	-	-	-	9,508	100.00%	Democratic hold
District 78	13,927	47.59%	15,337	52.41%	-	-	29,264	100.00%	Republican gain
District 79	10,591	84.34%	-	-	1,967	15.66%	12,558	100.00%	Democratic hold
District 80	18,652	100.00%	-	-	-	-	18,652	100.00%	Democratic hold
District 81	-	-	21,048	100.00%	-	-	21,048	100.00%	Republican hold
District 82	-	-	28,006	100.00%	-	-	28,006	100.00%	Republican hold
District 83	-	-	33,824	100.00%	-	-	33,824	100.00%	Republican hold
District 84	7,248	31.80%	15,541	68.20%	-	-	22,789	100.00%	Republican hold
District 85	10,713	38.09%	17,416	61.91%	-	-	28,129	100.00%	Republican gain
District 86	-	-	32,375	100.00%	-	-	32,375	100.00%	Republican hold
District 87	4,148	18.89%	16,979	77.33%	830	3.78%	21,957	100.00%	Republican hold
District 88	-	-	25,263	100.00%	-	-	25,263	100.00%	Republican hold
District 89	-	-	43,947	100.00%	-	-	43,947	100.00%	Republican hold
District 90	7,759	65.32%	4,120	34.68%	-	-	11,879	100.00%	Democratic hold
District 91	-	-	22,445	100.00%	-	-	22,445	100.00%	Republican hold
District 92	9,307	28.52%	23,330	71.48%	-	-	32,637	100.00%	Republican hold
District 93	12,132	47.59%	12,563	49.28%	799	3.13%	25,494	100.00%	Republican gain
District 94	-	-	24,565	84.53%	4,496	15.47%	29,061	100.00%	Republican hold
District 95	19,835	100.00%	-	-	-	-	19,835	100.00%	Democratic hold
District 96	21,583	47.61%	23,747	52.39%	-	-	45,330	100.00%	Republican gain
District 97	-	-	28,275	86.41%	4,448	13.59%	32,723	100.00%	Republican hold
District 98	-	-	46,750	100.00%	-	-	46,750	100.00%	Republican hold
District 99	-	-	31,931	100.00%	-	-	31,931	100.00%	Republican hold
District 100	14,469	100.00%	-	-	-	-	14,469	100.00%	Democratic hold
District 101	12,338	48.19%	13,266	51.81%	-	-	25,604	100.00%	Republican gain
District 102	11,791	45.36%	14,202	54.64%	-	-	25,993	100.00%	Republican gain
District 103	7,626	100.00%	-	-	-	-	7,626	100.00%	Democratic hold
District 104	7,936	100.00%	-	-	-	-	7,936	100.00%	Democratic hold
District 105	9,799	44.90%	11,286	51.71%	740	3.39%	21,825	100.00%	Republican hold
District 106	10,444	48.50%	10,648	49.44%	444	2.06%	51,536	100.00%	Republican gain
District 107	14,683	46.48%	16,226	51.37%	648	2.15%	31,587	100.00%	Republican gain
District 108	10,793	32.71%	21,420	64.92%	783	2.37%	32,996	100.00%	Republican hold
District 109	34,911	98.99%	-	-	357	1.01%	35,268	100.00%	Democratic hold
District 110	15,866	100.00%	-	-	-	-	15,866	100.00%	Democratic hold
District 111	25,783	100.00%	-	-	-	-	25,783	100.00%	Democratic hold
District 112	-	-	22,206	83.22%	4,478	16.78%	26,684	100.00%	Republican hold
District 113	12,430	42.85%	16,579	57.15%	-	-	29,009	100.00%	Republican hold
District 114	11,000	34.89%	20,529	65.11%	-	-	31,529	100.00%	Republican hold
District 115	-	-	22,946	83.09%	4,669	16.91%	27,615	100.00%	Republican hold
District 116	16,889	100.00%	-	-	-	-	16,889	100.00%	Democratic hold
District 117	13,635	48.11%	14,705	51.89%	-	-	28,340	100.00%	Republican gain
District 118	13,824	100.00%	-	-	-	-	13,824	100.00%	Democratic hold
District 119	13,390	61.39%	8,422	38.61%	-	-	21,812	100.00%	Democratic hold
District 120	14,700	100.00%	-	-	-	-	14,700	100.00%	Democratic hold
District 121	-	-	32,713	100.00%	-	-	32,713	100.00%	Republican hold
District 122	16,576	22.62%	56,702	77.38%	-	-	73,278	100.00%	Republican hold
District 123	14,454	100.00%	-	-	-	-	14,454	100.00%	Democratic hold
District 124	15,260	79.23%	-	-	4,001	20.77%	19,621	100.00%	Democratic hold
District 125	16,590	78.50%	-	-	4,545	21.50%	21,135	100.00%	Democratic hold
District 126	11,938	31.86%	25,534	68.14%	-	-	37,472	100.00%	Republican hold
District 127	12,406	24.75%	37,725	75.25%	-	-	50,131	100.00%	Republican hold
District 128	-	-	21,121	100.00%	-	-	21,121	100.00%	Republican hold
District 129	-	-	31,526	100.00%	-	-	31,526	100.00%	Republican hold
District 130	-	-	50,389	88.93%	6,275	11.07%	56,664	100.00%	Republican hold
District 131	21,797	100.00%	-	-	-	-	21,797	100.00%	Democratic hold
District 132	14,764	31.70%	30,828	66.19%	985	2.11%	46,577	100.00%	Republican hold
District 133	11,403	42.43%	15,120	56.27%	349	1.30%	26,872	100.00%	Republican gain
District 134	25,254	49.32%	25,955	50.68%	-	-	51,209	100.00%	Republican gain
District 135	-	-	22,390	100.00%	-	-	22,390	100.00%	Republican hold
District 136	-	-	33,130	88.58%	4,270	11.42%	37,400	100.00%	Republican hold
District 137	6,151	58.72%	4,325	41.28%	-	-	10,476	100.00%	Democratic hold
District 138	9,646	35.49%	17,002	62.55%	532	1.96%	27,180	100.00%	Republican hold
District 139	20,842	100.00%	-	-	-	-	20,842	100.00%	Democratic hold
District 140	7,871	100.00%	-	-	-	-	7,871	100.00%	Democratic hold
District 141	19,592	76.32%	6,078	23.68%	-	-	25,670	100.00%	Democratic hold
District 142	21,147	100.00%	-	-	-	-	21,147	100.00%	Democratic hold
District 143	7,409	68.30%	3,438	31.70%	-	-	10,847	100.00%	Democratic hold
District 144	9,931	38.28%	15,425	59.45%	588	2.27%	25,944	100.00%	Republican hold
District 145	9,395	100.00%	-	-	-	-	9,395	100.00%	Democratic hold
District 146	25,098	100.00%	-	-	-	-	25,098	100.00%	Democratic hold
District 147	22,312	100.00%	-	-	-	-	22,312	100.00%	Democratic hold
District 148	13,903	58.68%	9,790	41.32%	-	-	23,693	100.00%	Democratic hold
District 149	15,641	52.23%	14,304	47.77%	-	-	29,945	100.00%	Democratic hold
District 150	13,027	26.84%	34,607	71.30%	904	1.86%	48,538	100.00%	Republican hold
Total	1,357,943	31.43%	2,795,975	64.71%	166,882	3.86%	4,320,800	100.00%	Source:
