= 2016 Texas House of Representatives election =

- November 8, 2016

All 150 seats in the Texas House of Representatives 76 seats needed for a majority
- Turnout: 59.39%
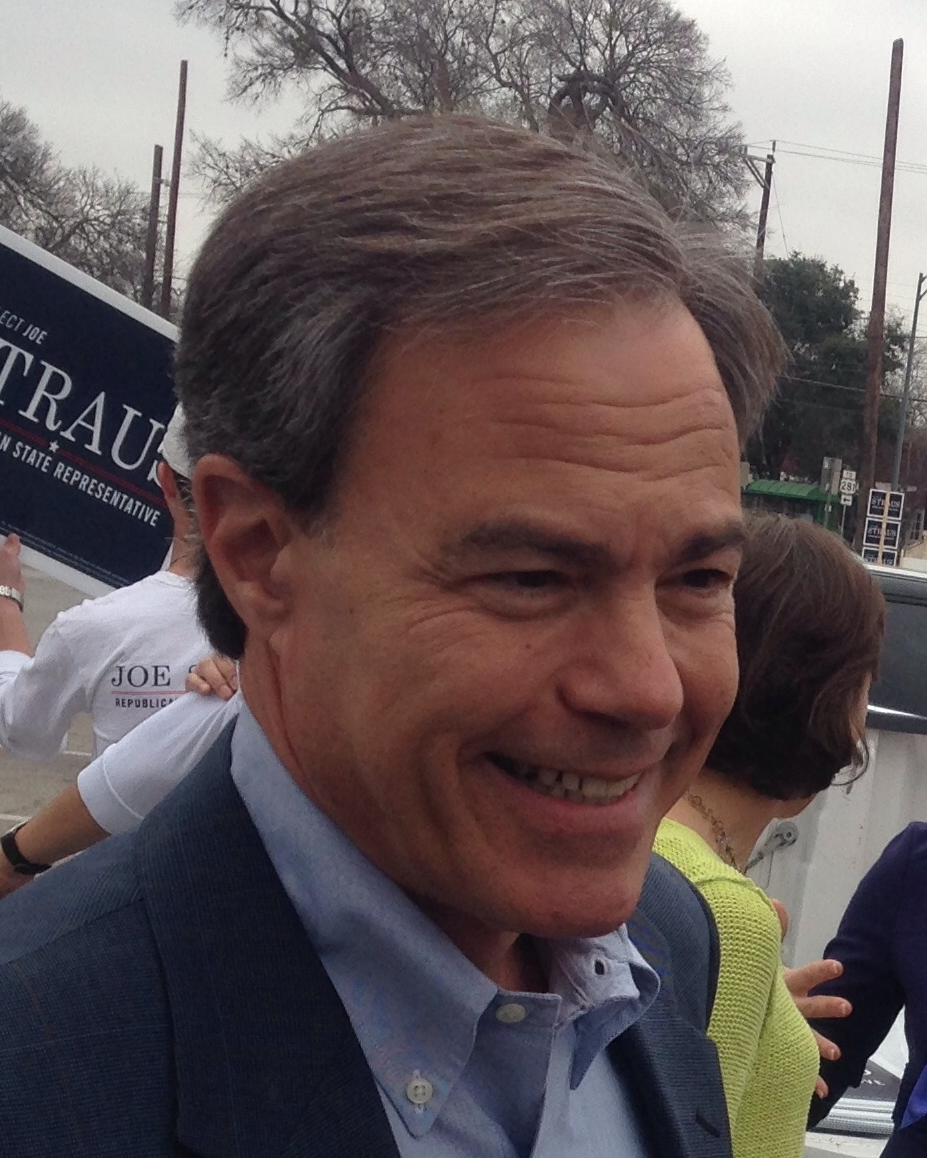

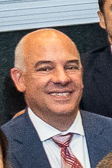
	Majority party	Minority party
Leader	Joe Straus	Chris Turner
Party	Republican	Democratic
Leader's seat	121st	101st
Last election	98	52
Seats before	99	50
Seats won	95	55
Seat change	▼4	▲5
Popular vote	4,711,481	2,746,667
Percentage	61.45%	35.83%
Swing	▼1.88%	▲3.73%
	Third party
Party	Independent
Last election	0
Seats before	1
Seats after	0
Seat change	▼1
Popular vote	9,072
Percentage	0.12%
Swing	▲0.05%
- Republican hold Democratic hold Democratic gain Republican: 50–60% 60–70% 70–80% 80–90% ≥90% Democratic: 50–60% 60–70% 70–80% 80–90% ≥90%
Speaker before election
Joe Straus
Republican
Elected Speaker
Joe Straus
Republican

An election was held on November 8, 2016 to elect all 41 members to Texas' House of Representatives. The election coincided with the elections for other offices, including U.S. President, U.S. House of Representatives and state senate. The primary election was held on March 1, 2016 with a run-off on May 24, 2016. The winners of this election served in the 85th Texas Legislature.

Republicans retained control of the House despite losing four seats, winning 95 seats compared to 55 seats for the Democrats.

== Predictions ==
Analysts expected Democrats to be able to make mild inroads in the House due to a highly-energized Latino electorate; however, they did not expect this to meaningfully reduce Republicans' control over the chamber.

Source	Ranking	As of
Governing	Safe R	Oct. 12, 2016

== Results ==
=== Statewide ===
Summary of the November 8, 2016 Texas House of Representatives election results
Party	Candi- dates	Votes	%	Seats	+/–
Republican Party	114	4,711,481	61.45%	95	▼4
Democratic Party	90	2,746,667	35.83%	55	▲5
Libertarian Party	26	182,815	2.38%	0	–
Green Party	6	15,286	0.20%	0	–
Independent	1	9,072	0.12%	0	▼1
Write-in	2	1,237	0.02%	0	–
Total	239	7,666,558	100.00%	150	–

Popular vote
Republican	61.82%
Democratic	35.83%
Libertarian	2.02%
Green	0.20%
Independent	0.12%
Write-in	0.02%

House seats won
Republican	63.33%
Democratic	36.67%

=== Close races ===
Seats where the margin of victory was under 10%:

1. District 105, 0.14%
2. District 107, 0.58% (gain)
3. District 115, 1.78%
4. District 117, 2.68% (gain)
5. District 102, 9.32%
6. District 54, 9.68%
7. District 135, 9.70%

=== District ===
Results of the 2016 Texas House of Representatives election by district:

District	Democratic		Republican		Others		Total		Result
District	Votes	%	Votes	%	Votes	%	Votes	%	Result
District 1	-	-	49,840	100.00%	-	-	49,840	100.00%	Republican hold
District 2	-	-	54,605	100.00%	-	-	54,605	100.00%	Republican hold
District 3	-	-	56,737	100.00%	-	-	56,737	100.00%	Republican hold
District 4	-	-	52,089	100.00%	-	-	52,089	100.00%	Republican hold
District 5	-	-	51,428	100.00%	-	-	51,428	100.00%	Republican hold
District 6	-	-	46,382	100.00%	-	-	46,382	100.00%	Republican hold
District 7	-	-	45,026	100.00%	-	-	45,026	100.00%	Republican hold
District 8	-	-	43,240	100.00%	-	-	43,240	100.00%	Republican hold
District 9	-	-	53,172	100.00%	-	-	53,172	100.00%	Republican hold
District 10	-	-	51,729	86.94%	7,773	13.06%	59,502	100.00%	Republican hold
District 11	14,276	25.15%	42,481	74.85%	-	-	56,757	100.00%	Republican hold
District 12	-	-	38,826	100.00%	-	-	38,826	100.00%	Republican hold
District 13	14,965	21.37%	55,073	78.63%	-	-	70,038	100.00%	Republican hold
District 14	-	-	37,330	100.00%	-	-	37,330	100.00%	Republican hold
District 15	-	-	65,439	100.00%	-	-	65,439	100.00%	Republican hold
District 16	-	-	55,968	100.00%	-	-	55,968	100.00%	Republican hold
District 17	-	-	41,694	100.00%	-	-	41,694	100.00%	Republican hold
District 18	-	-	40,966	88.01%	5,581	11.99%	46,547	100.00%	Republican hold
District 19	-	-	58,542	100.00%	-	-	58,542	100.00%	Republican hold
District 20	-	-	61,745	100.00%	-	-	61,745	100.00%	Republican hold
District 21	-	-	54,753	100.00%	-	-	54,753	100.00%	Republican hold
District 22	38,009	100.00%	-	-	-	-	38,009	100.00%	Democratic hold
District 23	25,501	41.13%	36,501	58.87%	-	-	62,002	100.00%	Republican hold
District 24	-	-	59,789	100.00%	-	-	59,789	100.00%	Republican hold
District 25	-	-	44,280	100.00%	-	-	44,280	100.00%	Republican hold
District 26	28,910	42.14%	39,693	57.86%	-	-	68,603	100.00%	Republican hold
District 27	45,718	67.98%	21,536	32.02%	-	-	67,254	100.00%	Democratic hold
District 28	-	-	56,822	100.00%	-	-	56,822	100.00%	Republican hold
District 29	28,505	38.93%	44,713	61.07%	-	-	73,218	100.00%	Republican hold
District 30	-	-	47,975	100.00%	-	-	47,975	100.00%	Republican hold
District 31	30,829	100.00%	-	-	-	-	30,829	100.00%	Democratic hold
District 32	-	-	40,435	100.00%	-	-	40,435	100.00%	Republican hold
District 33	24,199	28.88%	56,802	67.80%	2,783	3.32%	83,784	100.00%	Republican hold
District 34	33,221	100.00%	-	-	-	-	33,221	100.00%	Democratic hold
District 35	25,812	100.00%	-	-	-	-	25,812	100.00%	Democratic hold
District 36	29,633	100.00%	-	-	-	-	29,633	100.00%	Democratic hold
District 37	26,587	100.00%	-	-	-	-	26,587	100.00%	Democratic hold
District 38	30,850	100.00%	-	-	-	-	30,850	100.00%	Democratic hold
District 39	29,713	100.00%	-	-	-	-	29,713	100.00%	Democratic hold
District 40	23,257	73.78%	8,266	26.22%	-	-	31,523	100.00%	Democratic hold
District 41	24,863	56.78%	18,924	43.22%	-	-	43,787	100.00%	Democratic hold
District 42	35,124	100.00%	-	-	-	-	35,124	100.00%	Democratic hold
District 43	19,735	38.87%	31,040	61.13%	-	-	50,775	100.00%	Republican hold
District 44	20,411	27.43%	53,997	72.57%	-	-	74,408	100.00%	Republican hold
District 45	-	-	47,937	100.00%	-	-	47,937	100.00%	Republican hold
District 46	37,457	70.29%	10,209	19.16%	5,623	10.55%	53,289	100.00%	Democratic hold
District 47	42,635	41.69%	54,784	53.57%	4,838	4.73%	102,257	100.00%	Republican hold
District 48	60,512	79.40%	-	-	15,702	20.60%	76,214	100.00%	Democratic hold
District 49	68,398	84.41%	-	-	12,631	15.59%	81,029	100.00%	Democratic hold
District 50	43,637	63.69%	24,882	36.31%	-	-	68,519	100.00%	Democratic hold
District 51	42,082	87.23%	-	-	6,162	12.77%	48,244	100.00%	Democratic hold
District 52	-	-	40,329	75.51%	13,082	24.49%	53,411	100.00%	Republican hold
District 53	14,256	20.03%	54,741	76.92%	2,170	3.05%	71,167	100.00%	Republican hold
District 54	23,794	45.16%	28,894	54.84%	-	-	52,688	100.00%	Republican hold
District 55	-	-	35,950	100.00%	-	-	35,950	100.00%	Republican hold
District 56	-	-	43,979	86.54%	6,840	13.46%	50,819	100.00%	Republican hold
District 57	-	-	47,916	100.00%	-	-	47,916	100.00%	Republican hold
District 58	-	-	54,149	100.00%	-	-	54,149	100.00%	Republican hold
District 59	-	-	43,217	100.00%	-	-	43,217	100.00%	Republican hold
District 60	-	-	61,668	100.00%	-	-	61,668	100.00%	Republican hold
District 61	-	-	70,708	100.00%	-	-	70,708	100.00%	Republican hold
District 62	-	-	50,076	100.00%	-	-	50,076	100.00%	Republican hold
District 63	-	-	64,120	100.00%	-	-	64,120	100.00%	Republican hold
District 64	26,288	38.41%	42,158	61.59%	-	-	68,446	100.00%	Republican hold
District 65	26,759	43.74%	34,418	56.26%	-	-	61,177	100.00%	Republican hold
District 66	27,240	38.73%	40,368	57.39%	2,726	3.88%	70,334	100.00%	Republican hold
District 67	29,036	39.68%	41,440	56.63%	2,704	3.69%	73,180	100.00%	Republican hold
District 68	-	-	50,625	100.00%	-	-	50,625	100.00%	Republican hold
District 69	-	-	41,640	100.00%	-	-	41,640	100.00%	Republican hold
District 70	24,057	28.47%	56,684	67.08%	3,758	4.45%	84,499	100.00%	Republican hold
District 71	10,647	19.36%	44,335	80.64%	-	-	54,982	100.00%	Republican hold
District 72	-	-	46,571	100.00%	-	-	46,571	100.00%	Republican hold
District 73	-	-	77,592	100.00%	-	-	77,592	100.00%	Republican hold
District 74	31,724	100.00%	-	-	-	-	31,724	100.00%	Democratic hold
District 75	32,576	100.00%	-	-	-	-	32,576	100.00%	Democratic hold
District 76	32,956	100.00%	-	-	-	-	32,956	100.00%	Democratic hold
District 77	28,819	100.00%	-	-	-	-	28,819	100.00%	Democratic hold
District 78	31,185	63.36%	18,030	36.64%	-	-	49,215	100.00%	Democratic hold
District 79	35,427	100.00%	-	-	-	-	35,427	100.00%	Democratic hold
District 80	32,548	100.00%	-	-	-	-	32,548	100.00%	Democratic hold
District 81	-	-	37,306	100.00%	-	-	37,306	100.00%	Republican hold
District 82	-	-	47,432	100.00%	-	-	47,432	100.00%	Republican hold
District 83	-	-	53,437	100.00%	-	-	53,437	100.00%	Republican hold
District 84	-	-	35,627	100.00%	-	-	35,627	100.00%	Republican hold
District 85	23,334	39.60%	35,594	60.40%	-	-	58,928	100.00%	Republican hold
District 86	-	-	58,050	100.00%	-	-	58,050	100.00%	Republican hold
District 87	-	-	38,067	100.00%	-	-	38,067	100.00%	Republican hold
District 88	-	-	41,209	100.00%	-	-	41,209	100.00%	Republican hold
District 89	24,861	32.67%	48,341	63.53%	2,890	3.80%	76,092	100.00%	Republican hold
District 90	20,925	100.00%	-	-	-	-	20,925	100.00%	Democratic hold
District 91	-	-	43,601	100.00%	-	-	43,601	100.00%	Republican hold
District 92	24,806	38.74%	35,622	55.64%	3,599	5.62%	64,027	100.00%	Republican hold
District 93	23,987	39.33%	37,002	60.67%	-	-	60,989	100.00%	Republican hold
District 94	-	-	39,224	73.64%	14,037	26.36%	53,261	100.00%	Republican hold
District 95	35,246	75.60%	11,376	24.40%	-	-	46,622	100.00%	Democratic hold
District 96	29,434	43.02%	38,991	56.98%	-	-	68,425	100.00%	Republican hold
District 97	27,019	39.11%	39,537	57.23%	2,531	3.66%	69,087	100.00%	Republican hold
District 98	21,547	24.80%	65,348	75.20%	-	-	86,895	100.00%	Republican hold
District 99	-	-	45,201	82.79%	9,393	17.21%	54,594	100.00%	Republican hold
District 100	33,198	86.99%	-	-	4,965	13.01%	38,163	100.00%	Democratic hold
District 101	30,591	66.33%	15,530	33.67%	-	-	46,121	100.00%	Democratic hold
District 102	26,208	45.34%	31,595	54.66%	-	-	57,803	100.00%	Republican hold
District 103	30,323	100.00%	-	-	-	-	30,323	100.00%	Democratic hold
District 104	26,751	100.00%	-	-	-	-	26,751	100.00%	Democratic hold
District 105	23,656	49.93%	23,720	50.07%	-	-	47,376	100.00%	Republican hold
District 106	-	-	55,596	80.80%	13,209	19.20%	68,805	100.00%	Republican hold
District 107	27,922	50.76%	27,086	49.24%	-	-	55,008	100.00%	Democratic gain
District 108	-	-	47,799	72.50%	18,131	27.50%	65,930	100.00%	Republican hold
District 109	53,458	82.74%	11,155	17.26%	-	-	64,613	100.00%	Democratic hold
District 110	31,380	100.00%	-	-	-	-	31,380	100.00%	Democratic hold
District 111	44,918	78.20%	12,520	21.80%	-	-	57,438	100.00%	Democratic hold
District 112	23,351	42.78%	31,234	57.22%	-	-	54,585	100.00%	Republican hold
District 113	24,795	44.84%	30,501	55.16%	-	-	55,296	100.00%	Republican hold
District 114	27,367	40.57%	37,588	55.72%	2,502	3.71%	67,457	100.00%	Republican hold
District 115	28,939	49.11%	29,987	50.89%	-	-	58,926	100.00%	Republican hold
District 116	36,772	100.00%	-	-	-	-	36,772	100.00%	Democratic hold
District 117	29,319	51.27%	27,783	48.59%	78	0.14%	57,180	100.00%	Democratic gain
District 118	25,632	55.17%	20,831	44.83%	-	-	46,463	100.00%	Democratic gain
District 119	33,384	100.00%	-	-	-	-	33,384	100.00%	Democratic hold
District 120	31,510	77.65%	-	-	9,072	22.35%	40,582	100.00%	Democratic gain
District 121	-	-	56,970	100.00%	-	-	56,970	100.00%	Republican hold
District 122	-	-	73,957	100.00%	-	-	73,957	100.00%	Republican hold
District 123	38,649	100.00%	-	-	-	-	38,649	100.00%	Democratic hold
District 124	38,622	100.00%	-	-	-	-	38,622	100.00%	Democratic hold
District 125	38,774	100.00%	-	-	-	-	38,774	100.00%	Democratic hold
District 126	23,991	39.17%	35,528	58.00%	1,735	2.83%	61,254	100.00%	Republican hold
District 127	-	-	49,712	81.90%	10,987	18.10%	60,699	100.00%	Republican hold
District 128	-	-	42,287	86.41%	6,653	13.59%	48,940	100.00%	Republican hold
District 129	-	-	47,339	100.00%	-	-	47,339	100.00%	Republican hold
District 130	-	-	62,952	100.00%	-	-	62,952	100.00%	Republican hold
District 131	40,583	100.00%	-	-	-	-	40,583	100.00%	Democratic hold
District 132	-	-	40,001	80.23%	9,854	19.77%	49,855	100.00%	Republican hold
District 133	-	-	54,471	100.00%	-	-	54,471	100.00%	Republican hold
District 134	38,958	43.30%	48,192	53.56%	2,831	3.15%	89,981	100.00%	Republican hold
District 135	26,905	45.15%	32,682	54.85%	-	-	59,587	100.00%	Republican hold
District 136	34,077	45.00%	41,643	55.00%	-	-	75,720	100.00%	Republican hold
District 137	18,088	66.99%	8,178	30.29%	735	2.72%	27,001	100.00%	Democratic hold
District 138	-	-	31,958	100.00%	-	-	31,958	100.00%	Republican hold
District 139	41,913	100.00%	-	-	-	-	41,913	100.00%	Democratic hold
District 140	22,349	100.00%	-	-	-	-	22,349	100.00%	Democratic hold
District 141	33,831	100.00%	-	-	-	-	33,831	100.00%	Democratic hold
District 142	36,280	100.00%	-	-	-	-	36,280	100.00%	Democratic hold
District 143	26,247	100.00%	-	-	-	-	26,247	100.00%	Democratic hold
District 144	16,287	60.25%	10,745	39.75%	-	-	27,032	100.00%	Democratic gain
District 145	25,838	100.00%	-	-	-	-	25,838	100.00%	Democratic hold
District 146	39,452	97.15%	-	-	1,159	2.85%	40,611	100.00%	Democratic hold
District 147	43,900	76.27%	11,985	20.82%	1,676	2.91%	57,561	100.00%	Democratic hold
District 148	33,633	100.00%	-	-	-	-	33,633	100.00%	Democratic hold
District 149	27,613	63.55%	15,840	36.45%	-	-	43,453	100.00%	Democratic hold
District 150	27,893	36.81%	47,892	63.19%	-	-	75,785	100.00%	Republican hold
Total	2,746,667	35.83%	4,711,481	61.45%	208,410	2.72%	7,666,558	100.00%	
