= 2014 Texas House of Representatives election =

- November 4, 2014

All 150 seats in the Texas House of Representatives 76 seats needed for a majority
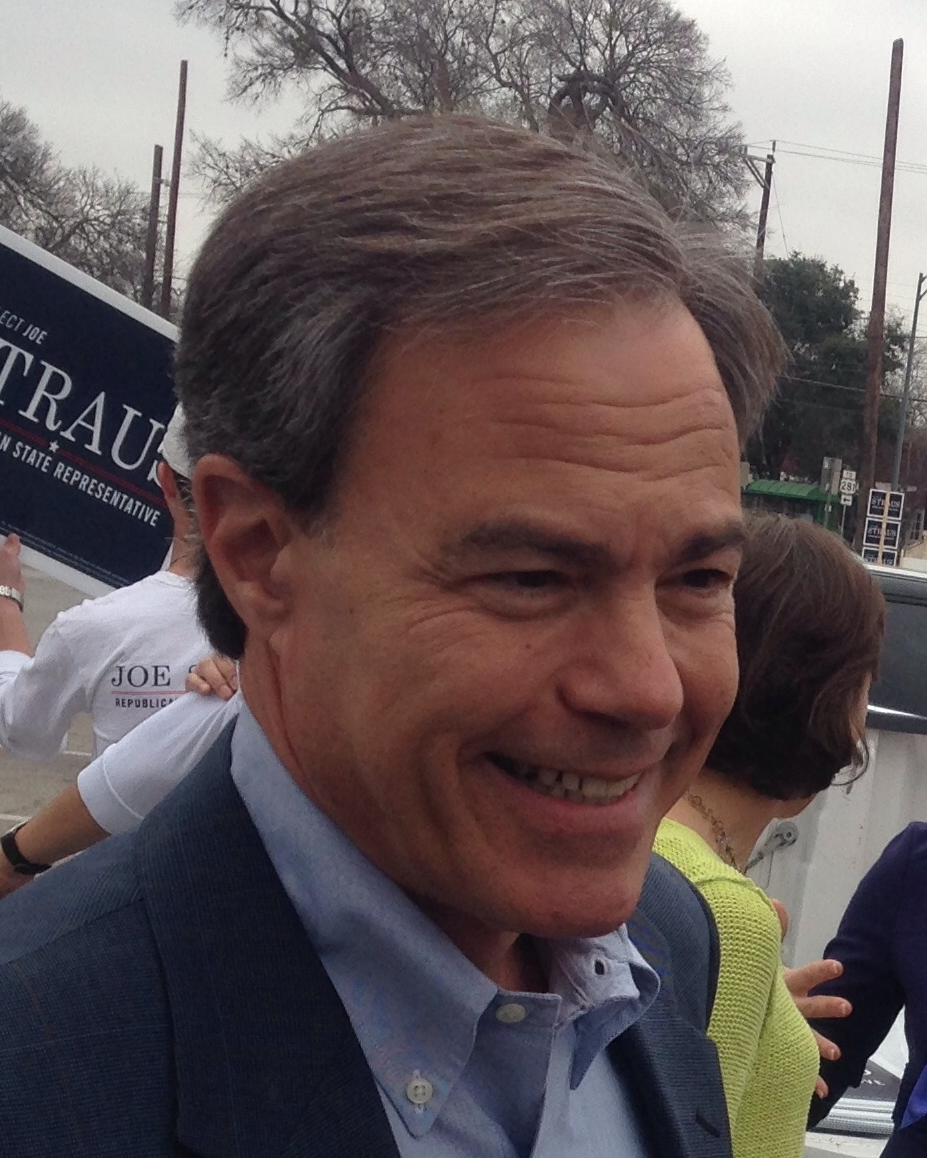

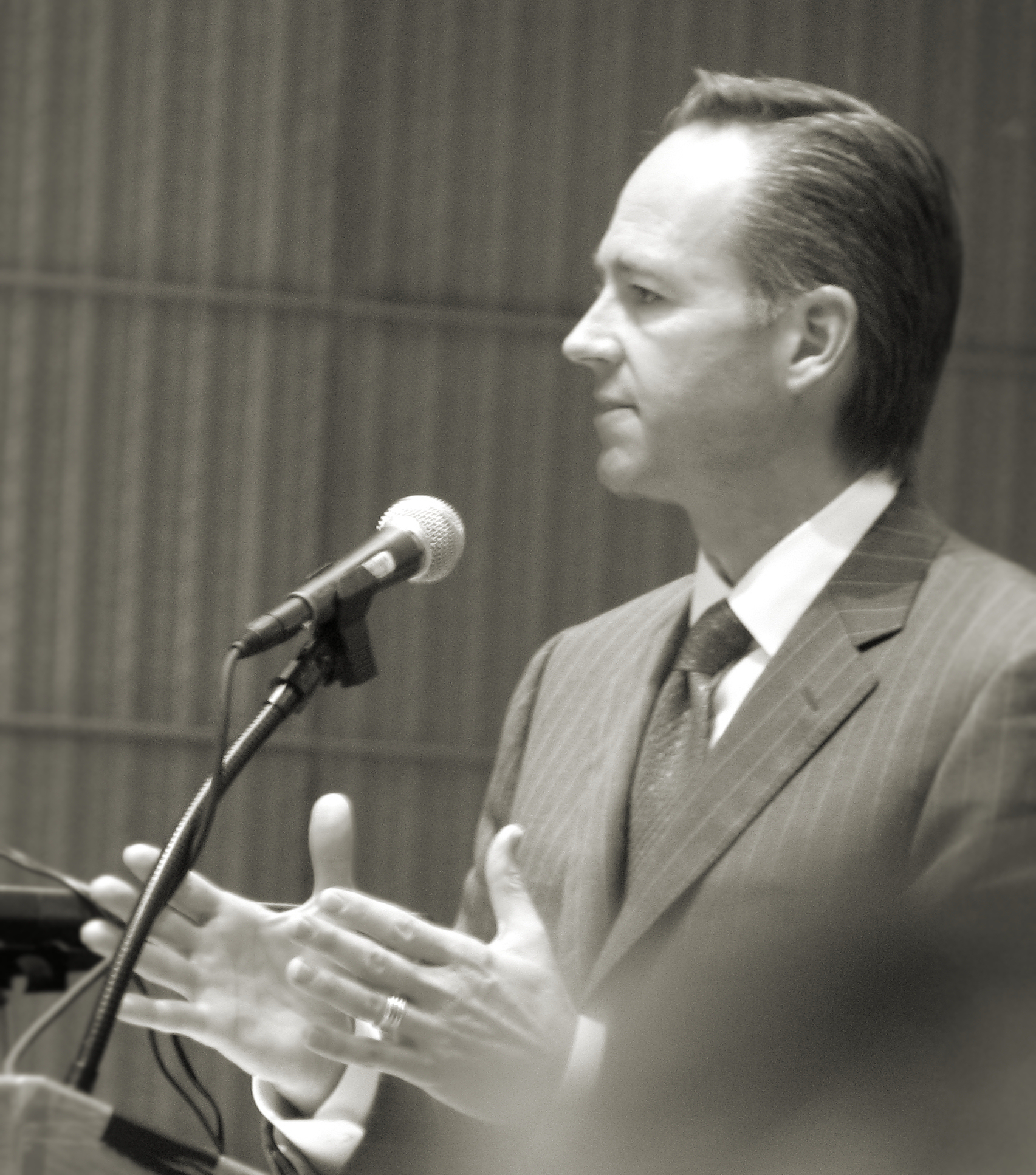
	Majority party	Minority party
Leader	Joe Straus	Craig Eiland (retired)
Party	Republican	Democratic
Leader since	January 13, 2009	January 9, 2007
Leader's seat	121st	23rd
Seats before	95	55
Seats won	98	52
Seat change	▲3	▼3
Popular vote	2,589,656	1,305,080
Percentage	63.70%	32.10%
Swing	▲1.18%	▼1.26%
- Republican hold Republican gain Democratic hold Republican: 50–60% 60–70% 70–80% 80–90% ≥90% Democratic: 50–60% 60–70% 70–80% 80–90% ≥90%
Speaker before election
Joe Straus
Republican
Elected Speaker
Joe Straus
Republican

The 2014 Texas House of Representatives elections took place as part of the biennial United States elections. Texas voters elected state representatives in all 150 State House of Representatives districts. The winners of this election served in the 84th Texas Legislature. State representatives serve for two-year terms.

At the beginning of the Eighty-third Texas Legislature following the 2012 Texas State House of Representatives elections, the Democrats held 55 seats to the Republicans' 95.

This election marked the first time Republicans ever won a state house race in Chambers County.

== Predictions ==
Owing to a Republican-leaning national environment and the state's recent trend towards the Republican Party, analysts predicted that the party would easily maintain its large margin of control over the Texas House.

Source	Ranking	As of
Governing	Safe R	Oct. 20, 2014

== Results ==
=== Statewide ===
Summary of the November 4, 2014 Texas House of Representatives election results
Party	Candi- dates	Votes	%	Seats	+/–
Republican Party	107	2,589,656	63.70%	98	▲3
Democratic Party	90	1,305,080	32.10%	52	▼3
Libertarian Party	39	153,750	3.78%	0	–
Green Party	6	13,536	0.33%	0	–
Independent	1	3,166	0.07%	0	–
Write-in	1	165	0.00%	0	–
Total		4,065,262	100.00%	150	–

Popular vote
Republican	63.70%
Democratic	32.10%
Libertarian	3.78%
Green	0.33%
Independent	0.07%
Write-in	0.00%

House seats won
Republican	65.33%
Democratic	34.67%

=== Close races ===
This election marked a low point in seat competitiveness for the Texas House of Representatives. 69% of seats only drew candidates from only one major political party, and 45% of seats hosted unopposed races. Only 8% of seats featured more than two political parties, and only 4 races were decided by margins under 10%.

1. District 144, 1.28% (gain)
2. District 117, 5.40% (gain)
3. District 23, 9.28% (gain)
4. District 149, 9.80%

=== Results by district ===
District	Democratic		Republican		Others		Total		Result
District	Votes	%	Votes	%	Votes	%	Votes	%	Result
District 1	-	-	29,585	100.00%	-	-	29,585	100.00%	Republican hold
District 2	-	-	28,847	100.00%	-	-	28,847	100.00%	Republican hold
District 3	-	-	28,760	91.08%	2,818	8.92%	31,578	100.00%	Republican hold
District 4	-	-	26,660	89.13%	3,253	10.87%	29,913	100.00%	Republican hold
District 5	-	-	30,779	92.34%	2,552	7.66%	33,331	100.00%	Republican hold
District 6	-	-	26,684	87.84%	3,695	12.16%	30,379	100.00%	Republican hold
District 7	-	-	25,342	100.00%	-	-	25,342	100.00%	Republican hold
District 8	-	-	25,897	87.85%	3,581	12.15%	29,478	100.00%	Republican hold
District 9	-	-	29,412	100.00%	-	-	29,412	100.00%	Republican hold
District 10	-	-	27,319	100.00%	-	-	27,319	100.00%	Republican hold
District 11	-	-	25,980	100.00%	-	-	25,980	100.00%	Republican hold
District 12	-	-	22,617	100.00%	-	-	22,617	100.00%	Republican hold
District 13	-	-	35,589	100.00%	-	-	35,589	100.00%	Republican hold
District 14	6,358	28.49%	15,193	68.08%	765	3.43%	22,316	100.00%	Republican hold
District 15	-	-	36,260	100.00%	-	-	36,260	100.00%	Republican hold
District 16	4,748	13.66%	29,132	83.79%	887	2.55%	34,767	100.00%	Republican hold
District 17	12,459	35.40%	22,737	64.60%	-	-	35,196	100.00%	Republican hold
District 18	-	-	23,808	100.00%	-	-	23,808	100.00%	Republican hold
District 19	-	-	30,543	100.00%	-	-	30,543	100.00%	Republican hold
District 20	10,883	22.73%	35,110	73.33%	1,884	3.94%	47,877	100.00%	Republican hold
District 21	9,739	25.61%	28,283	74.39%			38,022	100.00%	Republican hold
District 22	24,203	100.00%	-	-	-	-	24,203	100.00%	Democratic hold
District 23	14,763	45.36%	17,184	54.64%	-	-	32,547	100.00%	Republican GAIN
District 24	-	-	31,757	100.00%	-	-	31,757	100.00%	Republican hold
District 25	-	-	25,927	100.00%	-	-	25,927	100.00%	Republican hold
District 26	11,080	30.32%	25,458	69.68%	-	-	36,538	100.00%	Republican hold
District 27	24,326	66.98%	11,990	33.02%	-	-	36,316	100.00%	Democratic hold
District 28	-	-	30,122	100.00%	-	-	30,122	100.00%	Republican hold
District 29	-	-	25,777	100.00%	-	-	25,777	100.00%	Republican hold
District 30	-	-	28,224	100.00%	-	-	28,224	100.00%	Republican hold
District 31	16,396	100.00%	-	-	-	-	16,396	100.00%	Democratic hold
District 32	-	-	23,348	100.00%	-	-	23,348	100.00%	Republican hold
District 33	-	-	32,013	100.00%	-	-	32,013	100.00%	Republican hold
District 34	16,241	100.00%	-	-	-	-	16,241	100.00%	Democratic hold
District 35	11,431	100.00%	-	-	-	-	11,431	100.00%	Democratic hold
District 36	12,055	100.00%	-	-	-	-	12,055	100.00%	Democratic hold
District 37	10,504	100.00%	-	-	-	-	10,504	100.00%	Democratic hold
District 38	11,718	100.00%	-	-	-	-	11,718	100.00%	Democratic hold
District 39	14,409	100.00%	-	-	-	-	14,409	100.00%	Democratic hold
District 40	11,998	100.00%	-	-	-	-	11,998	100.00%	Democratic hold
District 41	11,532	57.46%	8,539	42.54%	-	-	20,071	100.00%	Democratic hold
District 42	16,103	88.44%	-	-	2,104	11.56%	18,207	100.00%	Democratic hold
District 43	10,869	38.59%	17,294	61.41%	-	-	28,163	100.00%	Republican hold
District 44	9,821	24.32%	30,558	75.68%	-	-	40,379	100.00%	Republican hold
District 45	-	-	25,739	72.64%	9,696	27.36%	35,435	100.00%	Republican hold
District 46	23,959	84.03%	-	-	4,552	15.97%	28,511	100.00%	Democratic hold
District 47	-	-	37,455	73.04%	13,822	26.96%	51,277	100.00%	Republican hold
District 48	39,668	78.10%	-	-	11,126	21.90%	50,794	100.00%	Democratic hold
District 49	38,548	85.08%	-	-	6,759	14.92%	45,307	100.00%	Democratic hold
District 50	22,690	58.68%	14,359	37.13%	1,620	4.19%	38,669	100.00%	Democratic hold
District 51	21,467	87.36%	-	-	3,105	12.64%	24,572	100.00%	Democratic hold
District 52	12,452	38.53%	18,235	56.42%	1,633	5.05%	32,320	100.00%	Republican hold
District 53	-	-	36,878	89.91%	4,139	10.09%	41,017	100.00%	Republican hold
District 54	-	-	17,190	100.00%	-	-	17,190	100.00%	Republican hold
District 55	-	-	18,278	100.00%	-	-	18,278	100.00%	Republican hold
District 56	-	-	25,654	83.35%	5,125	16.65%	30,779	100.00%	Republican hold
District 57	-	-	28,174	100.00%	-	-	28,174	100.00%	Republican hold
District 58	6,532	19.56%	26,866	80.44%	-	-	33,398	100.00%	Republican hold
District 59	-	-	22,586	100.00%	-	-	22,586	100.00%	Republican hold
District 60	-	-	33,878	100.00%	-	-	33,878	100.00%	Republican hold
District 61	7,458	16.96%	36,504	83.04%	-	-	43,962	100.00%	Republican hold
District 62	-	-	24,501	100.00%	-	-	24,501	100.00%	Republican hold
District 63	9,026	22.66%	30,809	77.34%	-	-	39,835	100.00%	Republican hold
District 64	12,611	33.77%	23,674	63.39%	1,059	2.84%	37,344	100.00%	Republican hold
District 65	10,440	35.69%	18,812	64.31%	-	-	29,252	100.00%	Republican hold
District 66	-	-	24,751	100.00%	-	-	24,751	100.00%	Republican hold
District 67	-	-	25,432	78.56%	6,941	21.44%	32,373	100.00%	Republican hold
District 68	-	-	30,979	100.00%	-	-	30,979	100.00%	Republican hold
District 69	-	-	22,822	100.00%	-	-	22,822	100.00%	Republican hold
District 70	-	-	29,534	100.00%	-	-	29,534	100.00%	Republican hold
District 71	-	-	22,950	100.00%	-	-	22,950	100.00%	Republican hold
District 72	-	-	24,364	100.00%	-	-	24,364	100.00%	Republican hold
District 73	-	-	46,194	100.00%	-	-	46,194	100.00%	Republican hold
District 74	15,968	100.00%	-	-	-	-	15,968	100.00%	Democratic hold
District 75	8,453	100.00%	-	-	-	-	8,453	100.00%	Democratic hold
District 76	11,923	87.09%	-	-	1,767	12.91%	13,690	100.00%	Democratic hold
District 77	11,324	78.15%	-	-	3,166	21.85%	14,490	100.00%	Democratic hold
District 78	12,880	100.00%	-	-	-	-	12,880	100.00%	Democratic hold
District 79	12,001	100.00%	-	-	-	-	12,001	100.00%	Democratic hold
District 80	14,981	89.61%	-	-	1,737	10.39%	16,718	100.00%	Democratic hold
District 81	-	-	17,006	99.04%	165	0.96%	17,171	100.00%	Republican hold
District 82	-	-	24,262	100.00%	-	-	24,262	100.00%	Republican hold
District 83	6,231	18.78%	26,950	81.22%	-	-	33,181	100.00%	Republican hold
District 84	6,347	27.29%	16,913	72.71%	-	-	23,260	100.00%	Republican hold
District 85	9,630	33.39%	19,215	66.61%	-	-	28,845	100.00%	Republican hold
District 86	-	-	31,589	100.00%	-	-	31,589	100.00%	Republican hold
District 87	3,664	15.67%	19,714	84.33%	-	-	23,378	100.00%	Republican hold
District 88	-	-	22,578	93.17%	1,654	6.83%	24,232	100.00%	Republican hold
District 89	11,154	28.39%	28,135	71.61%	-	-	39,289	100.00%	Republican hold
District 90	9,909	100.00%	-	-	-	-	9,909	100.00%	Democratic hold
District 91	9,349	28.18%	22,802	68.74%	1,021	3.08%	33,172	100.00%	Republican hold
District 92	12,567	36.38%	21,976	63.62%	-	-	34,543	100.00%	Republican hold
District 93	-	-	20,433	100.00%	-	-	20,433	100.00%	Republican hold
District 94	16,481	40.49%	23,046	56.63%	1,172	2.88%	40,699	100.00%	Republican hold
District 95	21,908	75.78%	7,002	24.22%	-	-	28,910	100.00%	Democratic hold
District 96	-	-	22,822	80.75%	5,442	19.25%	28,264	100.00%	Republican hold
District 97	-	-	27,977	81.63%	6,295	18.37%	24,272	100.00%	Republican hold
District 98	-	-	39,407	100.00%	-	-	39,407	100.00%	Republican hold
District 99	-	-	26,144	100.00%	-	-	26,144	100.00%	Republican hold
District 100	17,209	89.97%	-	-	1,919	10.03%	19,128	100.00%	Democratic hold
District 101	14,926	84.59%	-	-	2,270	15.41%	17,646	100.00%	Democratic hold
District 102	12,243	37.51%	20,394	62.49%	-	-	32,637	100.00%	Republican hold
District 103	12,190	100.00%	-	-	-	-	12,190	100.00%	Democratic hold
District 104	9,765	100.00%	-	-	-	-	9,765	100.00%	Democratic hold
District 105	10,478	42.72%	13,600	55.45%	449	1.83%	24,527	100.00%	Republican hold
District 106	9,614	27.53%	24,419	69.93%	886	2.54%	34,919	100.00%	Republican hold
District 107	13,807	44.98%	16,891	55.02%	-	-	30,683	100.00%	Republican hold
District 108	16,182	39.32%	24,973	60.68%	-	-	41,155	100.00%	Republican hold
District 109	31,504	100.00%	-	-	-	-	31,504	100.00%	Democratic hold
District 110	15,505	100.00%	-	-	-	-	15,505	100.00%	Democratic hold
District 111	26,681	100.00%	-	-	-	-	26,681	100.00%	Democratic hold
District 112	-	-	19,131	81.63%	4,305	18.37%	23,436	100.00%	Republican hold
District 113	12,047	40.57%	17,644	59.43%	-	-	29,691	100.00%	Republican hold
District 114	-	-	25,334	81.07%	5,915	81.07%	31,249	100.00%	Republican hold
District 115	11,767	39.53%	16,999	57.11%	999	3.36%	29,765	100.00%	Republican hold
District 116	16,639	100.00%	-	-	-	-	16,639	100.00%	Democratic hold
District 117	11,521	47.30%	12,835	52.70%	-	-	24,356	100.00%	Republican GAIN
District 118	14,531	100.00%	-	-	-	-	14,531	100.00%	Democratic hold
District 119	15,361	100.00%	-	-	-	-	15,361	100.00%	Democratic hold
District 120	16,892	82.28%	-	-	3,637	17.72%	20,529	100.00%	Democratic hold
District 121	-	-	33,845	82.10%	7,381	17.90%	41,226	100.00%	Republican hold
District 122	-	-	42,473	85.01%	7,489	14.99%	49,962	100.00%	Republican hold
District 123	20,178	86.28%	-	-	3,210	13.72%	23,388	100.00%	Democratic hold
District 124	16,236	100.00%	-	-	-	-	16,236	100.00%	Democratic hold
District 125	17,143	76.92%	-	-	5,144	23.08%	22,287	100.00%	Democratic hold
District 126	-	-	23,899	86.31%	3,791	13.69%	27,690	100.00%	Republican hold
District 127	-	-	31,214	100.00%	-	-	31,214	100.00%	Republican hold
District 128	-	-	23,887	90.70%	2,450	9.30%	26,337	100.00%	Republican hold
District 129	12,540	32.19%	26,415	67.81%	-	-	38,955	100.00%	Republican hold
District 130	-	-	34,489	90.77%	3,506	9.23%	37,995	100.00%	Republican hold
District 131	20,408	100.00%	-	-	-	-	20,408	100.00%	Democratic hold
District 132	10,523	33.88%	20,535	66.12%	-	-	31,058	100.00%	Republican hold
District 133	11,754	25.40%	34,530	74.60%	-	-	46,284	100.00%	Republican hold
District 134	20,364	38.82%	32,092	61.18%	-	-	52,456	100.00%	Republican hold
District 135	10,175	34.14%	19,630	65.86%	-	-	29,805	100.00%	Republican hold
District 136	15,821	41.10%	20,862	54.20%	1,811	4.70%	38,494	100.00%	Republican hold
District 137	7,155	57.86%	5,211	42.14%	-	-	12,366	100.00%	Democratic hold
District 138	8,766	33.22%	17,622	66.78%	-	-	26,388	100.00%	Republican hold
District 139	21,802	100.00%	-	-	-	-	21,802	100.00%	Democratic hold
District 140	8,125	100.00%	-	-	-	-	8,125	100.00%	Democratic hold
District 141	16,162	100.00%	-	-	-	-	16,162	100.00%	Democratic hold
District 142	17,602	100.00%	-	-	-	-	17,602	100.00%	Democratic hold
District 143	10,610	100.00%	-	-	-	-	10,610	100.00%	Democratic hold
District 144	5,863	49.36%	6,015	50.64%	-	-	11,878	100.00%	Republican GAIN
District 145	10,255	100.00%	-	-	-	-	10,255	100.00%	Democratic hold
District 146	21,702	91.87%	-	-	1,920	8.13%	23,622	100.00%	Democratic hold
District 147	25,288	100.00%	-	-	-	-	25,288	100.00%	Democratic hold
District 148	14,207	60.29%	9,356	39.71%	-	-	23,563	100.00%	Democratic hold
District 149	11,954	54.90%	9,820	45.10%	-	-	21,774	100.00%	Democratic hold
District 150	10,328	26.85%	28,133	73.15%	-	-	38,461	100.00%	Republican hold
Total	1,305,080	32.10%	2,589,565	63.70%	170,617	4.20%	4,065,262	100.00%	Source:
