= Yvonne Davis =

American politician (born 1955)

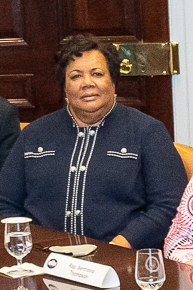
- Davis in 2021

Member of the Texas House of Representatives from the 111th district
- In office January 12, 1993
- Preceded by: Jerald Henry Larry

Personal details
- Born: February 4, 1955 (age 71)
- Party: Democratic
- Education: University of Houston (BS)
- Profession: Small business owner
- Website: Office website

Yvonne Davis is a Democratic member of the Texas House of Representatives, representing the 111th District since 1992.

== Birth ==
Davis was born on February 4, 1955, in Dallas, Texas.

== Education ==
Davis received her BS at the University of Houston.

== Professional experience ==
Yvonne Davis has been a small business owner.

== Political experience ==
Davis has been a member of the Texas State House of Representatives since 1992. Rep. Davis currently serves on the Transportation and Judiciary and Civil Jurisprudence Committees.

== Current committee assignments ==
- State Affairs
- Land & Resource Management
