= Texas's 54th House of Representatives district =

American legislative district

Texas's 54th State House of Representatives district
Representative
Brad Buckley; R–Salado
- Demographics: 38.7% White; 31.4% Black; 24.7% Hispanic; 5.0% Asian
- Population (2020) • Voting age: 185,290; 134,595

The 54th district of the Texas House of Representatives contains roughly half of the population of Bell County, and includes most of the city of Killeen. The current representative is Brad Buckley, who was first elected in 2018.
