= Texas's 111th House of Representatives district =

American legislative district

Texas's 111th State House of Representatives district
Representative
Yvonne Davis; D–Dallas
- Demographics: 12.5% White; 49.8% Black; 34.6% Hispanic; 3.1% Asian
- Population (2020) • Voting age: 184,755; 136,448

The 111th district of the Texas House of Representatives consists of southwestern portions of the city of Dallas, all of the city of Duncanville, and part of DeSoto. The current representative is Yvonne Davis, who has represented the district since 2003.
