= Texas's 123rd House of Representatives district =

American legislative district

Texas's 123rd State House of Representatives district
Representative
Diego Bernal; D–San Antonio
- Demographics: 25.3% White; 5.7% Black; 66.3% Hispanic; 2.8% Asian
- Population (2020) • Voting age: 197,123; 112,658

The 123rd district of the Texas House of Representatives contains parts of Bexar County. The current representative is Diego Bernal, who was first elected in 2014.
