= Texas's 130th House of Representatives district =

American legislative district

Texas's 130th State House of Representatives district
Representative
Tom Oliverson; R–Houston
- Demographics: 54.7% White; 10.5% Black; 24.0% Hispanic; 9.3% Asian
- Population (2020) • Voting age: 192,603; 138,299

The 130th district of the Texas House of Representatives contains parts of Harris County. The current representative is Tom Oliverson, who was first elected in 2016.
