= Texas's 31st House of Representatives district =

American legislative district

Texas's 31st State House of Representatives district
Representative
Ryan Guillen; R–Rio Grande City
since January 14, 2003

District 31 is a district in the Texas House of Representatives. It was created in the 3rd Texas Legislature (1849–1851).

The district encompasses Brooks, Duval, Jim Hogg, Karnes, Kennedy, La Salle, Live Oak, McMullen, Starr, Wilson and Zapata. Starr County accounts for 35% of the population, the most of any county in the district. The district has been represented by Ryan Guillen since 2003.
