= Texas's 116th House of Representatives district =

American legislative district

Texas's 116th State House of Representatives district
Representative
Trey Martinez Fischer; D–San Antonio
- Demographics: 21.9% White; 8.8% Black; 61.3% Hispanic; 8.3% Asian
- Population (2020) • Voting age: 199,721; 159,526

The 116th district of the Texas House of Representatives contains parts of central San Antonio. The current representative is Trey Martinez Fischer, who was first elected in 2018.
