= Texas's 144th House of Representatives district =

American legislative district

Texas's 144th State House of Representatives district
Representative
Mary Ann Perez; D–Houston
- Demographics: 13.6% White; 7.6% Black; 75.6% Hispanic; 3.3% Asian
- Population (2020) • Voting age: 203,960; 146,211

The 144th district of the Texas House of Representatives contains parts of Houston, South Houston, and Pasadena. The current representative is Mary Ann Perez, who has represented the district since 2017.
