= Texas's 108th House of Representatives district =

American legislative district

Texas's 108th State House of Representatives district
Representative
Morgan Meyer; R–Dallas
- Demographics: 75.6% White; 5.3% Black; 10.7% Hispanic; 6.6% Asian
- Population (2020) • Voting age: 187,178; 150,711

The 108th district of the Texas House of Representatives consists of portions of northern Dallas, all of Highland Park, and all of University Park in Dallas County. The current representative is Morgan Meyer, who has represented the district since 2014.

The district is home to Southern Methodist University in University Park.

== Recent election results ==
Texas House District 108 vote by party in recent elections
Year	Democratic	Republican	Other
2024	42.18% 43,310	57.82% 59,373	-
2022	43.55% 38,390	56.45% 49,755	-
2020	48.03% 48,590	49.65% 50,229	2.31% 2,340
