= Texas's 103rd House of Representatives district =

American legislative district

Texas's 103rd State House of Representatives district
Representative
Rafael Anchia; D–Dallas
- Demographics: 22.2% White; 10.3% Black; 61.8% Hispanic; 5.2% Asian
- Population (2020) • Voting age: 184,639; 143,421

The 103rd district of the Texas House of Representatives represents central and eastern Grand Prairie, and a portion of west Dallas. The current representative is Rafael Anchia, who has represented the district since 2005.
