= Texas's 147th House of Representatives district =

American legislative district

Texas's 147th State House of Representatives district
Representative
Jolanda Jones; D
- Demographics: 21.3% White; 32.9% Black; 37.0% Hispanic; 9.0% Asian
- Population (2020) • Voting age: 201,033; 162,711

The 147th district of the Texas House of Representatives contains parts of Houston. The current representative is Jolanda Jones, who has represented the district since 2022.

== List of representatives ==
- Garnet Coleman from 1991 to 2022, leaving a vacancy until a 2022 special election elected Jolanda Jones.
