= Texas's 142nd House of Representatives district =

American legislative district

Texas's 142nd State House of Representatives district
Representative
Harold Dutton Jr. D–Houston
- Demographics: 12.6% White; 38.4% Black; 46.7% Hispanic; 2.8% Asian
- Population (2020) • Voting age: 193,612; 138,996

The 142nd district of the Texas House of Representatives contains parts of northeastern Houston. The current representative is Harold Dutton Jr., who has represented the district since 1985.
