= Texas's 95th House of Representatives district =

American legislative district

Texas's 95th State House of Representatives district
Representative
Nicole Collier; D–Fort Worth
- Demographics: 18.7% White; 41.9% Black; 35.6% Hispanic; 3.8% Asian
- Population (2020) • Voting age: 203,993; 149,313

The 95th district of the Texas House of Representatives contains a portion of Tarrant county. The current representative is Nicole Collier, who was first elected in 2012.
