= Texas's 138th House of Representatives district =

American legislative district

Texas's 138th State House of Representatives district
Representative
Lacey Hull; R–Houston
- Demographics: 36.9% White; 10.0% Black; 41.1% Hispanic; 11.5% Asian
- Population (2020) • Voting age: 198,419; 152,454

The 138th district of the Texas House of Representatives contains parts of northwestern Houston. The current representative is Lacey Hull, who was first elected in 2020.

The district includes Jersey Village and other portions of the Cypress-Fairbanks (Cy-Fair) area.
