= Texas's 13th House of Representatives district =

Texas's 13th State House of Representatives district
Representative
Angelia Orr; R–Itasca
- Demographics: 54.9% White; 17.5% Black; 24.8% Hispanic; 1.1% Asian; 1.7% Other
- Population (2020) • Voting age: 188,981; 145,156

District 13 is a district in the Texas House of Representatives. It was created in the 3rd legislature (1849–1851).

The district has been represented by Republican Angelia Orr since January 10, 2023, upon her initial election to the Texas House.

As a result of redistricting after the 2020 Federal census, from the 2022 elections the district encompasses all of Bosque, Falls, Freestone, Hill, Leon, and Limestone, Counties, and the eastern portion of McLennan County. Major cities in the district include Centerville, Clifton, Fairfield, Groesbeck, Hillsboro, Marlin, and Navasota. Fairfield Lake State Park, the center of a long-running controversy over its closure and attempts to repurchase the land, is in the district, along with Lake Whitney.
