= Texas's 118th House of Representatives district =

American legislative district

Texas's 118th State House of Representatives district
Representative
John Lujan; R–San Antonio
- Demographics: 27.2% White; 6.6% Black; 63.4% Hispanic; 2.7% Asian
- Population (2020) • Voting age: 203,245; 151,245

The 118th district of the Texas House of Representatives contains parts of central San Antonio. The current representative is John Lujan, who was first elected in 2020.
