= Texas's 24th House of Representatives district =

American legislative district

Texas's 24th State House of Representatives district
Representative
Greg Bonnen; R–League City
since January 10th, 2023
- Demographics: 60% White; 11% Black; 21.8% Hispanic; 5.3% Asian
- Population (2020): 198,848

District 24 is a district in the Texas House of Representatives. It was created in the 3rd legislature (1849–1851).

The district is entirely within Galveston County, accounting for over half of its representation in the chamber. It also includes Dickinson, Friendswood, Hitchcock, nearly all of League City and a small portion of Texas City.

== Elections ==
General Election 2022: District 24
Party	Candidate	Votes	%	±%
Republican	Greg Bonnen	47,240	68.01	+1.91
Democratic	Michael J. Creedon	20,842	30.01	+2.44

General Election 2020: District 24
Party	Candidate	Votes	%	±%
Republican	Greg Bonnen	65,560	69.92	+0.33
Democratic	Brian J. Rogers	25,848	27.57	−0.80

General Election 2018: District 24
Party	Candidate	Votes	%	±%
Republican	Greg Bonnen	48,045	69.59	+0
Democratic	John Y. Phelps	19,586	28.37	+0
