= Texas's 135th House of Representatives district =

American legislative district

Texas's 135th State House of Representatives district
Representative
Jon Rosenthal; D–Houston
- Demographics: 20.0% White; 23.9% Black; 46.7% Hispanic; 9.9% Asian
- Population (2020) • Voting age: 203,172; 144,609

The 135th district of the Texas House of Representatives contains parts of north-central Houston. The current representative is Jon Rosenthal, who was first elected in 2018 after defeating a 12-term incumbent.
