= Texas's 140th House of Representatives district =

American legislative district

Texas's 140th State House of Representatives district
Representative
Armando Walle; D–Houston
- Demographics: 5.6% White; 10.2% Black; 82.4% Hispanic; 2.0% Asian
- Population (2020) • Voting age: 186,188; 130,011

The 140th district of the Texas House of Representatives contains parts of north-central Houston. It is one of the least-non-White Hispanic districts in the state legislature. The current representative is Armando Walle, who was first elected in 2009.
