= Texas's 136th House of Representatives district =

American legislative district

Texas's 136th State House of Representatives district
Representative
John Bucy III; D–Austin
- Demographics: 46.8% White; 10.2% Black; 24.7% Hispanic; 16.9% Asian
- Population (2020) • Voting age: 203,587; 152,857

The Texas House of Representatives 136th district represents portions of Austin, Cedar Park, and Round Rock in Williamson County. The current representative is John Bucy III, who has represented the district since 2019.

A small stretch of major highway I-35 runs through the district.
