= Texas's 27th House of Representatives district =

American legislative district

Texas's 27th State House of Representatives district
Representative
Ron Reynolds; D–Missouri City
- Demographics: 16.6% White; 42.2% Black; 25.2% Hispanic; 16.6% Asian
- Population (2020) • Voting age: 197,352; 145,498

District 27 is a district in the Texas House of Representatives. It was created in the 3rd Legislature (1849–1851).

The district is fully within Fort Bend County, accounting for nearly a quarter of the counties representation. It includes Missouri City, Fresno, Sienna, Arcola, and portions of Stafford, Pearland, and Houston.

== Elections ==
General Election 2022: District 27
Party	Candidate	Votes	%	±%
Democratic	Ron Reynolds	40,668	70.27	
Republican	Sohrab Gilani	17,206	29.73	

General Election 2020: District 27
Party	Candidate	Votes	%	±%
Democratic	Ron Reynolds	56,373	67.81	
Republican	Tom Virippan	26,766	32.19	

General Election 2018: District 27
Party	Candidate	Votes	%	±%
Democratic	Ron Reynolds	47,450	100	

Democratic Primary Election 2018: District 27
Party	Candidate	Votes	%	±%
Democratic	Ron Reynolds	7,864	61.37	
Democratic	Wilvin Carter	4,950	38.63	
