= Texas's 113th House of Representatives district =

American legislative district

Texas's 113th State House of Representatives district
Representative
Rhetta Bowers; D–Dallas
- Demographics: 27.6% White; 26.3% Black; 36.3% Hispanic; 9.0% Asian
- Population (2020) • Voting age: 185,211; 137,513

The 113th district of the Texas House of Representatives contains parts of Garland, Rowlett, and Mesquite. The current representative is Rhetta Andrews Bowers, who has represented the district since 2019.
