= Texas's 148th House of Representatives district =

American legislative district

Texas's 148th State House of Representatives district
Representative
Penny Morales Shaw; D–Houston
- Demographics: 19.0% White; 15.8% Black; 56.4% Hispanic; 8.7% Asian
- Population (2020) • Voting age: 203,639; 151,087

The 148th district of the Texas House of Representatives contains northern parts of Houston. The current representative is Penny Morales Shaw, who has represented the district since 2021.
