= Texas's 132nd House of Representatives district =

American legislative district

Texas's 132nd State House of Representatives district
Representative
Mike Schofield; R–Houston
- Demographics: 43.1% White; 14.1% Black; 28.5% Hispanic; 13.3% Asian
- Population (2020) • Voting age: 196,710; 142,413

The 132nd district of the Texas House of Representatives contains parts of Harris County. The current representative is Mike Schofield, who was first elected in 2020.
