= Texas's 141st House of Representatives district =

American legislative district

Texas's 141st State House of Representatives district
Representative
Senfronia Thompson; D–Houston
- Demographics: 6.1% White; 46.3% Black; 46.1% Hispanic; 2.0% Asian
- Population (2020) • Voting age: 201,495; 141,906

The 141st district of the Texas House of Representatives contains parts of north-central Houston and Humble. It is one of the least-White districts in the state legislature. The current representative is Senfronia Thompson, who was first elected in 1973.
