= 87th Texas Legislature =

2021 meeting of the Texas legislature

←	86th	88th	→
- The Seal of Texas

Overview
- Legislative body: Texas State Legislature
- Jurisdiction: Texas
- Term: January 12, 2021 – May 31, 2021
- Election: 2020 general election

Senate
- Members: 31
- President of the Senate: Dan Patrick (R)
- President pro tempore: Brian Birdwell (R–22) (regular session) * Donna Campbell (R–25) (special session)
- Party control: Republican

House of Representatives
- Members: 150
- Speaker: Dade Phelan (R–21)
- Speaker Pro Tempore: Joe Moody (D–78) (January 12 - July 15, 2021) * Vacant (July 15, 2021- February 8, 2023)
- Party control: Republican

Sessions
- 1st: July 8, 2021 – August 6, 2021
- 2nd: August 7, 2021 – September 2, 2021
- 3rd: September 20, 2021 – October 19, 2021

The 87th Texas Legislature was a meeting of the legislative branch of the U.S. state of Texas, composed of the Texas Senate and the Texas House of Representatives. The Texas State Legislature met in Austin, Texas, from January 12, 2021, to May 31, 2021. Governor Greg Abbott announced three special legislative sessions during summer 2021.

All seats in the state house and 16 seats in the state senate were up for election in November 2020. The Republican Party preserved their majority in both chambers.

== Major events ==
- March 13, 2020: Greg Abbott declares a statewide emergency concerning the spread of COVID-19.
- January 12, 2021: Legislature convened at noon (CST).
- February 10, 2021 – February 27, 2021: 2021 Texas power crisis.
- March 2, 2021: Greg Abbott announced the reopening of Texas businesses after nearly a year of various shutdowns and restrictions to quell the spread of COVID-19.
- May 30, 2021: House Democrats broke quorum, first time since 2003.
- May 31, 2021: Legislature adjourns.
- June 30, 2021: Greg Abbott announced he will convene a special legislative session on July 8.
- July 8, 2021: 87th Legislature 1st Called Session convened at 10:00 a.m. (CST).
- July 12, 2021: House Democrats fled to Washington, D.C., to break quorum, when the house convenes for the following day.
- July 13, 2021: The House lacks quorum. Will Metcalf (R) moved for a call of the house, which later passed.
- July 15, 2021: House Speaker Dade Phelan stripped Joe Moody from the Speaker Pro Tempore leadership position as house democrats continue to break quorum.
- August 5, 2021: Governor Abbott announced he will convene a second special legislative session on August 7.
- August 6, 2021: Legislature adjourns 1st special session.
- August 7, 2021: 87th Legislature 2nd Called Session convened at 12:00 p.m. (CST). The House continues to lack quorum, as several Democrats are still in Washington, D.C..
- August 19, 2021: Texas House makes quorum with 99 representatives present.
- September 2, 2021: Legislature adjourns 2nd special session.
- September 20, 2021: 87th Legislature 3rd Called Session convened at 10:00 a.m. (CST).
- October 19, 2021: Legislature adjourns 3rd special session.

== Major legislation ==
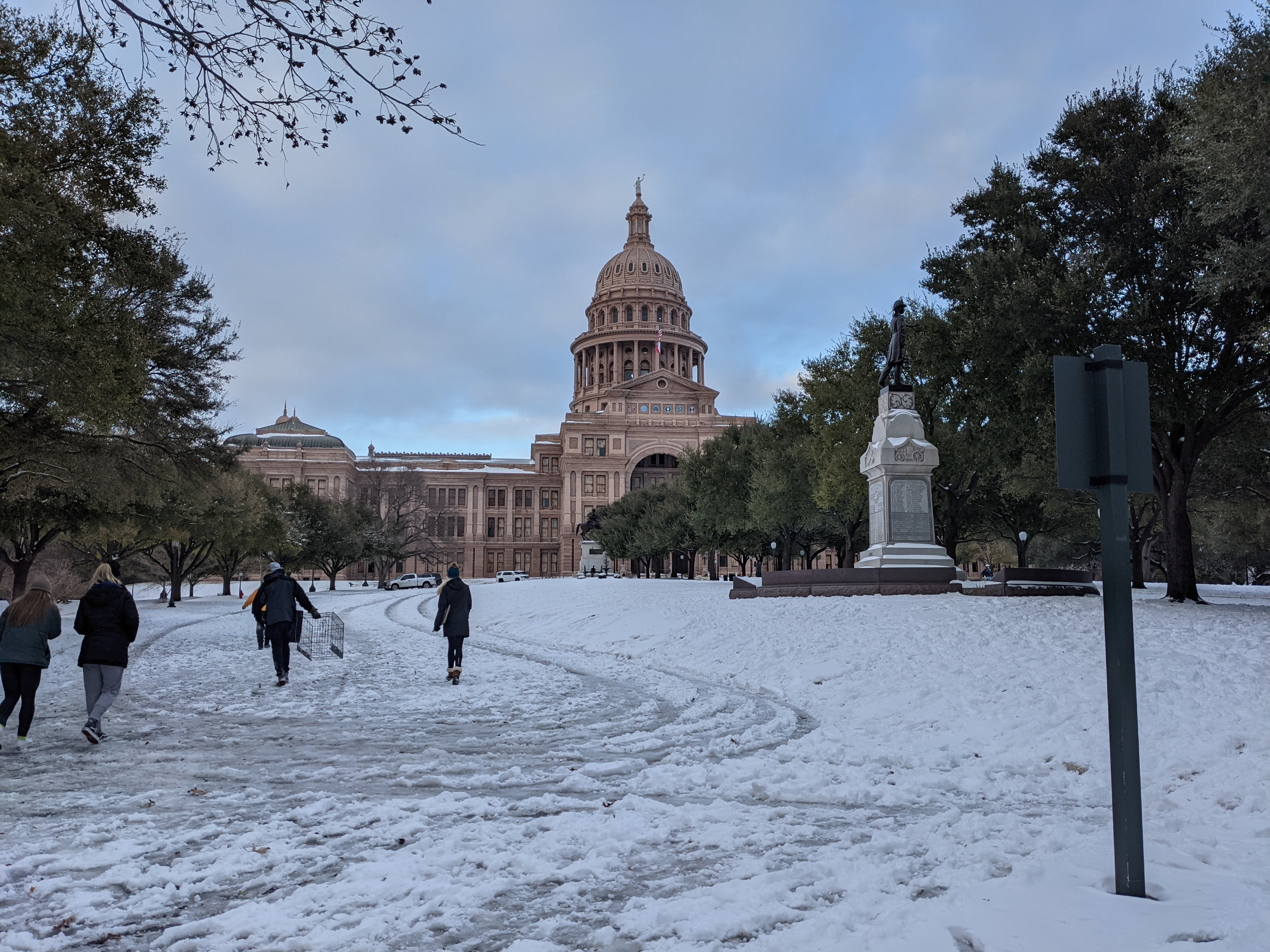
Texas State Capitol (February 15, 2021), after a winter storm.

=== Enacted ===
- House bills
  - HB 5: The measure would aim to incentivize the expansion of broadband internet access to areas across the state through the creation of the State Broadband Development Office. The office would award grants, low-interest loans and other incentives to build out broadband access.
  - HB 20: Prohibits large social media platform censorship of Texans.
  - HB 1239: The measure would ban public officials from closing churches or other places of worship during a disaster declaration.
  - HB 1280: The measure would ban abortion in Texas if Roe v. Wade were overturned by the Supreme Court of the United States.
  - HB 1927 (Constitutional carry): The measure would allow people to carry handguns in Texas without a concealed handgun license.
  - HB 3979: The bill would ban the teaching of critical race theory in Texas schools and limit what public school students can be taught about the United States' history of subjugating people of color.
- Senate bills
  - SB 1: Tightens the state's election laws and constrains local control of elections by limiting counties' ability to expand voting options.
  - TX SB3: An Act relating to certain curriculum in public schools, including certain instructional requirements and prohibitions
  - SB 3: The legislation would create a statewide emergency system to alert Texans if power outages are expected and require power generation companies to better prepare their facilities to withstand extreme weather.
  - SB 4: The bill would require any professional sports teams with contracts with the state government to play the national anthem before the start of a game.
  - SB 8: Texas Heartbeat Act (nicknamed "Fetal Heartbeat bill"): The measure allows private citizens to sue people who perpetrate or aid and abet abortions after a fetal heartbeat is detected. It bans the procedure at about six weeks into a pregnancy, except to save the mother's life.

=== Proposed (but not enacted) ===
- House bills
  - HB 3: The measure would give lawmakers more oversight of the governor's emergency powers during a pandemic and carves out future pandemics from how the state responds to other disasters, like hurricanes.
  - HB 20: The legislation would keep more people accused or previously convicted of violent crimes in jail before trial unless they can post cash bonds.
- Senate bills
  - SB 7: A change on the state election process; election integrity and security, including by preventing fraud in the conduct of elections in this state; increasing criminal penalties; creating criminal offenses.
  - SB 10: The bill would ban local governments from using taxpayer dollars to lobby the state.
  - SB 12: The bill would prohibit social media companies with at least 100 million monthly users from blocking, banning, demonetizing or discriminating against users based on their viewpoint or their location within the state.
  - SB 29: The bill would prevent transgender Texas children from joining school sports teams that match their gender identity.
  - SB 1311: The measure would prohibit health care providers and physicians from performing gender-confirmation surgery or prescribing, administering or supplying puberty blockers or hormone treatment to anyone younger than 18.
  - SB 1529: The measure would create a new statewide court of appeals that would hear cases that have statewide significance — including ones that challenge state laws or the Constitution, or when the state or its agencies are sued.

== Major resolutions adopted ==
- SR 2: Reduced the supermajority usually needed to bring up a bill in the Senate to 18 out of 31 (previously it was set at 19).

== Party summary ==
=== Senate ===
Senate membership

Affiliation	Party (shading indicates majority caucus)		Total	Vacant
Affiliation	Democratic	Republican	Total	Vacant
End of previous legislature	12	19	31	0
Begin (January 12, 2021)	13	18	31	0
Latest voting share	41.9%	58.1%		

==== Leadership ====
- President of the Senate: Dan Patrick (R)
- President Pro Tempore:
1. Brian Birdwell (R) (Regular session, January 12 - May 31)
2. Donna Campbell (R) (Ad Interim)

==== Members ====
- District 1: Bryan Hughes (R)
- District 2: Bob Hall (R)
- District 3: Robert Nichols (R)
- District 4: Brandon Creighton (R)
- District 5: Charles Schwertner (R)
- District 6: Carol Alvarado (D)
- District 7: Paul Bettencourt (R)
- District 8: Angela Paxton (R)
- District 9: Kelly Hancock (R)
- District 10: Beverly Powell (D)
- District 11: Larry Taylor (R)
- District 12: Jane Nelson (R)
- District 13: Borris Miles (D)
- District 14: Sarah Eckhardt (D)
- District 15: John Whitmire (D)
- District 16: Nathan Johnson (D)
- District 17: Joan Huffman (R)
- District 18: Lois Kolkhorst (R)
- District 19: Roland Gutierrez (D)
- District 20: Juan Hinojosa (D)
- District 21: Judith Zaffirini (D)
- District 22: Brian Birdwell (R)
- District 23: Royce West (D)
- District 24: Dawn Buckingham (R)
- District 25: Donna Campbell (R)
- District 26: Jose Menendez (D)
- District 27: Eddie Lucio Jr. (D)
- District 28: Charles Perry (R)
- District 29: Cesar Blanco (D)
- District 30: Drew Springer (R)
- District 31: Kel Seliger (R)

=== House of Representatives ===
House membership

Affiliation	Party (shading indicates majority caucus)		Total	Vacant
Affiliation	Democratic	Republican	Total	Vacant
End of previous legislature	67	83	150	0
Begin (January 12, 2021)	67	82	149	1
March 9, 2021 (Note: In District 68: The term began with vacant until David Spiller was declared the winner after a runoff election.)	67	83	150	0
July 30, 2021	67	82	149	1
August 19, 2021	66	82	148	2
October 12, 2021	66	83	149	1
November 15, 2021	65	84	149	1
November 16, 2021	65	85	150	0
January 31, 2022	64	85	149	1
February 28, 2022	63	85	148	2
March 15, 2022	64	85	149	1
May 18, 2022	65	85	150	0
Latest voting share	43.3%	56.7%		

==== Leadership ====
- Speaker of the House: Dade Phelan (R)
- Speaker Pro Tempore:
1. Joe Moody (D) (January 12 - July 15) (Note: The office remained vacant for the remainder of the legislature.)

==== Members ====
- District 1: Gary VanDeaver (R)
- District 2: Bryan Slaton (R)
- District 3: Cecil Bell Jr. (R)
- District 4: Keith Bell (R)
- District 5: Cole Hefner (R)
- District 6: Matt Schaefer (R)
- District 7: Jay Dean (R)
- District 8: Cody Harris (R)
- District 9: Chris Paddie (R)
- District 10:

* Jake Ellzey (R), until July 30, 2021
* Brian Harrison, from October 12, 2021

- District 11: Travis Clardy (R)
- District 12: Kyle Kacal (R)
- District 13: Ben Leman (R)
- District 14: John Raney (R)
- District 15: Steve Toth (R)
- District 16: Will Metcalf (R)
- District 17: John Cyrier (R)
- District 18: Ernest Bailes (R)
- District 19: James White (R)
- District 20: Terry Wilson (R)
- District 21: Dade Phelan (R)
- District 22: Joe Deshotel (D)
- District 23: Mayes Middleton (R)
- District 24: Greg Bonnen (R)
- District 25: Cody Vasut (R)
- District 26: Jacey Jetton (R)
- District 27: Ron Reynolds (D)
- District 28: Gary Gates (R)
- District 29: Edward Thompson (R)
- District 30: Geanie Morrison (R)
- District 31: Ryan Guillen (D, then R)
- District 32: Todd Hunter (R)
- District 33: Justin Holland (R)
- District 34: Abel Herrero (D)
- District 35: Oscar Longoria (D)
- District 36: Sergio Muñoz (D)
- District 37: Alex Dominguez (D)
- District 38: Eddie Lucio III (D)

* Eddie Lucio III (D), until January 31, 2022
* Erin Gamez, from March 15, 2022

- District 39: Armando Martinez (D)
- District 40: Terry Canales (D)
- District 41: Robert Guerra (D)
- District 42: Richard Raymond (D)
- District 43: José Manuel Lozano (R)
- District 44: John Kuempel (R)
- District 45: Erin Zwiener (D)
- District 46: Sheryl Cole (D)
- District 47: Vikki Goodwin (D)
- District 48: Donna Howard (D)
- District 49: Gina Hinojosa (D)
- District 50: Celia Israel (D)
- District 51: Eddie Rodriguez (D)
- District 52: James Talarico (D)
- District 53: Andrew Murr (R)
- District 54: Brad Buckley (R)
- District 55: Hugh Shine (R)
- District 56: Charles Anderson (R)
- District 57: Trent Ashby (R)
- District 58: DeWayne Burns (R)
- District 59: Shelby Slawson (R)
- District 60: Glenn Rogers (R)
- District 61: Phil King (R)
- District 62: Reggie Smith (R)
- District 63: Tan Parker (R)
- District 64: Lynn Stucky (R)
- District 65: Michelle Beckley (D)
- District 66: Matt Shaheen (R)
- District 67: Jeff Leach (R)
- District 68: David Spiller (R), from March 9, 2021
- District 69: James Frank (R)
- District 70: Scott Sanford (R)
- District 71: Stan Lambert (R)
- District 72: Drew Darby (R)
- District 73: Kyle Biedermann (R)
- District 74: Eddie Morales (D)
- District 75: Mary González (D)
- District 76: Claudia Ordaz Perez (D)
- District 77: Lina Ortega (D)
- District 78: Joe Moody (D)
- District 79: Art Fierro (D)
- District 80: Tracy King (D)
- District 81: Brooks Landgraf (R)
- District 82: Tom Craddick (R)
- District 83: Dustin Burrows (R)
- District 84: John Frullo (R)
- District 85: Phil Stephenson (R)
- District 86: John Smithee (R)
- District 87: Four Price (R)
- District 88: Ken King (R)
- District 89: Candy Noble (R)
- District 90: Ramon Romero Jr. (D)
- District 91: Stephanie Klick (R)
- District 92: Jeff Cason (R)
- District 93: Matt Krause (R)
- District 94: Tony Tinderholt (R)
- District 95: Nicole Collier (D)
- District 96: David Cook (R)
- District 97: Craig Goldman (R)
- District 98: Giovanni Capriglione (R)
- District 99: Charlie Geren (R)
- District 100: Jasmine Crockett (D)
- District 101: Chris Turner (D)
- District 102: Ana-Maria Ramos (D)
- District 103: Rafael Anchia (D)
- District 104: Jessica González (D)
- District 105: Terry Meza (D)
- District 106: Jared Patterson (R)
- District 107: Victoria Neave (D)
- District 108: Morgan Meyer (R)
- District 109: Carl Sherman (D)
- District 110: Toni Rose (D)
- District 111: Yvonne Davis (D)
- District 112: Angie Button (R)
- District 113: Rhetta Bowers (D)
- District 114: John Turner (D)
- District 115: Julie Johnson (D)
- District 116: Trey Martinez Fischer (D)
- District 117: Philip Cortez (D)
- District 118: Leo Pacheco (D), until August 19, 2021

* John Lujan, from November 16, 2021

- District 119: Elizabeth Campos (D)
- District 120: Barbara Gervin-Hawkins (D)
- District 121: Steve Allison (R)
- District 122: Lyle Larson (R)
- District 123: Diego Bernal (D)
- District 124: Ina Minjarez (D)
- District 125: Ray Lopez (D)
- District 126: Sam Harless (R)
- District 127: Dan Huberty (R)
- District 128: Briscoe Cain (R)
- District 129: Dennis Paul (R)
- District 130: Tom Oliverson (R)
- District 131: Alma Allen (D)
- District 132: Mike Schofield (R)
- District 133: Jim Murphy (R)
- District 134: Ann Johnson (D)
- District 135: Jon Rosenthal (D)
- District 136: John Bucy III (D)
- District 137: Gene Wu (D)
- District 138: Lacey Hull (R)
- District 139: Jarvis Johnson (D)
- District 140: Armando Walle (D)
- District 141: Senfronia Thompson (D)
- District 142: Harold Dutton Jr. (D)
- District 143: Ana Hernandez (D)
- District 144: Mary Ann Perez (D)
- District 145: Christina Morales (D)
- District 146: Shawn Thierry (D)
- District 147:

* Garnet Coleman (D), until February 28, 2022
* Jolanda Jones (D), from May 18, 2022

- District 148: Penny Morales Shaw (D)
- District 149: Hubert Vo (D)
- District 150: Valoree Swanson (R)

== Changes in membership ==
=== House of Representatives ===
District	Vacated by	Reason for change	Successor	Date of successor's formal installation
District 68	Vacant	Former member Drew Springer (R) was elected for the District 30 of the Senate in a special election. A special election for the district was held on January 23, 2021. * Out of 9,139 votes cast, no candidate received 50% of the votes to win the election. A runoff election was held to determine a winner of the top two candidates of the January election.	David Spiller (R)	March 9, 2021
District 10	Jake Ellzey (R)	Former member Jake Ellzey (R) was elected for the Texas's 6th congressional district of the United States House of Representatives in a special election. A special election for the district was held on August 31, 2021. * Out of 11,334 votes cast, no candidate received 50% of the votes to win the election. A runoff election was held to determine a winner of the top two candidates of the August election.	Brian Harrison (R)	October 12, 2021
District 31	Ryan Guillen (D)	Changed party November 15, 2021.	Ryan Guillen (R)	November 15, 2021
District 118	Leo Pacheco (D)	Former member Leo Pacheco (D) resigned to teach public administration at San Antonio College. A special election for the district was held on September 29, 2021. * Out of 7,075 votes cast, no candidate received 50% of the votes to win the election. A runoff election will be held to determine a winner of the top two candidates of the September election.	John Lujan (R)	November 16, 2021
District 38	Eddie Lucio III (D)	Former member Eddie Lucio III (D) resigned at the end of January 2022. A special election for the district was held on May 7, 2022. * The special election was canceled after only one candidate filed for the race. The filing deadline passed on March 7, 2022. In result, Erin Gamez was sworn into office on March 15, 2022.	Erin Gamez (D)	March 15, 2022
District 147	Garnet Coleman (D)	Former member Garnet Coleman (D) resigned at on February 28, 2022. A special election for the district was held on May 7, 2022.	Jolanda Jones (D)	May 18, 2022

== Committees ==
Listed by chamber and then alphabetically by committee name, including chair and vice-chair.

=== Senate ===
Committee	Chair	Vice-chair
Administration	Charles Schwertner (R-5)	Nathan Johnson (D-16)
Business & Commerce	Kelly Hancock (R-9)	Robert Nichols (R-3)
Child Protective Services (Special)	Lois Kolkhorst (R-18)	Charles Perry (R-28)
Constitutional Issues (Special) (Note: The committee was created to hear the House Bill 1927, the Constitutional carry bill.)	Charles Schwertner (R-5)	Brian Birdwell (R-22)
Criminal Justice	John Whitmire (D-15)	Joan Huffman (R-17)
Education	Larry Taylor (R-11)	Eddie Lucio Jr. (D-27)
Finance	Jane Nelson (R-12)	Eddie Lucio Jr. (D-27)
Future of College Sports in Texas (Select) (Note: The committee was created to study the athletic and economic impact of the University of Texas at Austin departure from the Big 12 Conference.)	Jane Nelson (R-12)	Brandon Creighton (R-4)
Health & Human Services	Lois Kolkhorst (R-18)	Charles Perry (R-28)
Higher Education	Brandon Creighton (R-4)	Royce West (D-23)
Jurisprudence	Joan Huffman (R-17)	Juan Hinojosa (D-20)
Local Government	Paul Bettencourt (R-7)	Jose Menendez (D-26)
Natural Resources & Economic Development	Brian Birdwell (R-22)	Judith Zaffirini (D-21)
Nominations	Dawn Buckingham (R-24)	Angela Paxton (R-8)
Ports (Select)	Brandon Creighton (R-4)	Carol Alvarado (D-6)
Protect All Texans (Special) (Note: The committee was created to study the events that unfolded during the Robb Elementary School shooting in Uvalde.)	Robert Nichols (R-3)	Brandon Creighton (R-4)
Protect All Texans (Special)	Robert Nichols (R-3)	Lois Kolkhorst (R-18)
Redistricting (Special)	Joan Huffman (R-17)	Juan Hinojosa (D-20)
State Affairs	Bryan Hughes (R-1)	Brian Birdwell (R-22)
Transportation	Robert Nichols (R-3)	Kel Seliger (R-31)
Veteran Affairs & Border Security	Donna Campbell (R-25)	Bob Hall (R-2)
Water, Agriculture & Rural Affairs	Charles Perry (R-28)	Drew Springer (R-30)

=== House ===
Committee	Chair	Vice-chair
Agriculture & Livestock	DeWayne Burns (R-58)	Charles Anderson (R-56)
Appropriations	Greg Bonnen (R-24)	Mary González (D-75)
Appropriations - S/C on Article II	Giovanni Capriglione (R-98)	Toni Rose (D-110)
Appropriations - S/C on Article III	Terry Wilson (R-20)	Erin Zwiener (D-45)
Appropriations - S/C on Articles I, IV & V	Mary González (D-75)	Matt Schaefer (R-6)
Appropriations - S/C on Articles VI, VII & VIII	Armando Walle (D-140)	Cecil Bell (R-3)
Approps. - S/C on Strategic Fiscal Rev. & Fed. Relief Funds	Cecil Bell Jr. (R-3)	Ina Minjarez (D-124)
Business & Industry	Chris Turner (D-101)	Cole Hefner (D-5)
Calendars	Dustin Burrows (R-83)	Joe Moody (D-78)
Constitutional Rights & Remedies (select) (Note: The committee was created to hear issues for the first special session.)	Trent Ashby (R-57)	Senfronia Thompson (D-141)
Corrections	Andrew Murr (R-53)	Alma Allen (D-131)
County Affairs	Garnet Coleman (D-147)	Lynn Stucky (R-64)
Criminal Jurisprudence	Nicole Collier (D-95)	Keith Bell (R-4)
Culture, Recreation & Tourism	Ken King (R-88)	Barbara Gervin-Hawkins (D-120)
Defense & Veterans' Affairs	Richard Raymond (D-42)	Brad Buckley (R-54)
Elections	Briscoe Cain (R-128)	Jessica González (D-104)
Energy Resources	Craig Goldman (R-97)	Abel Herrero (D-34)
Environmental Regulation	Brooks Landgraf (R-81)	Alex Dominguez (D-37)
General Investigating	Matt Krause (R-93)	Victoria Neave (D-107)
Health Care Reform (Select)	Sam Harless (R-126)	Toni Rose (D-110)
Higher Education	Jim Murphy (R-133)	Leo Pacheco (D-118) (January 12 - August 19, 2021); Vacant (August 19 - present)
Homeland Security & Public Safety	James White (R-19)	Rhetta Bowers (D-113)
House Administration	Will Metcalf (R-16)	Sheryl Cole (D-46)
Human Services	James Frank (R-69)	Gina Hinojosa (D-49)
Insurance	Tom Oliverson (R-130)	Hubert Vo (D-149)
International Relations & Economic Development	Angie Chen Button (R-112)	Christina Morales (D-145)
Judiciary & Civil Jurisprudence	Jeff Leach (R-67)	Yvonne Davis (D-111)
Juvenile Justice & Family Issues	Victoria Neave (D-107)	Valoree Swanson (R-150)
Land & Resource Management	Joe Deshotel (D-22)	Ben Leman (R-13)
Licensing & Administrative Procedures	Senfronia Thompson (D-141)	John Kuempel (R-44)
Local & Consent Calendars	Charlie Geren (R-99)	Alex Dominguez (D-37)
Natural Resources	Tracy King (D-80)	Cody Harris (R-8)
Pensions, Investments & Financial Services	Rafael Anchia (D-103)	Tan Parker (R-63)
Public Education	Harold Dutton Jr. (D-142)	José Manuel Lozano (R-43)
Public Health	Stephanie Klick (R-91)	Robert Guerra (politician) (D-41)
Redistricting	Todd Ames Hunter (R-32)	Toni Rose (D-110)
Resolutions Calendars	Ryan Guillen (D-31)	Steve Toth (R-15)
State Affairs	Chris Paddie (R-9)	Ana Hernandez (D-143)
The Robb Elementary School shooting (Investigate)	Dustin Burrows (R-83)	Joe Moody (D-78)
Transportation	Terry Canales (D-40)	Edward Thompson (R-29)
Urban Affairs	Philip Cortez (D-117)	Justin Holland (R-33)
Ways & Means	Morgan Meyer (R-108)	Shawn Thierry (D-146)
Youth Health & Safety (Select)	José Manuel Lozano (R-43)	Ann Johnson (D-134)
