= 82nd Texas Legislature =

The 82nd Texas Legislature began on January 11, 2011 and ended on May 29, 2011. All members of the House and 16 of the 31 members of the Senate were elected in the general election held on November 2, 2010.

== Party summary ==
=== Senate ===
Affiliation	Members	Note
Republican Party	19	
Democratic Party	12	
Total	31	

=== House of Representatives ===
Affiliation	Members	Note
Republican Party	101	
Democratic Party	49	
Total	150	

== Officers ==
=== Senate ===
- Lieutenant Governor: David Dewhurst (R)
- President Pro Tempore: Steve Ogden (R)

=== House of Representatives ===
- Speaker of the House: Joe Straus (R)
- Speaker Pro Tempore: Beverly Woolley (R)

== Members ==
=== Senate ===
Senator	Party	District	Home Town	Took office
Kevin Eltife	Republican	1	Tyler	2004
Bob Deuell	Republican	2	Greenville	2003
Robert Nichols	Republican	3	Jacksonville	2007
Tommy Williams	Republican	4	The Woodlands	2003
Steve Ogden	Republican	5	Bryan	1997
Mario Gallegos Jr.	Democratic	6	Houston	1995
Dan Patrick	Republican	7	Houston	2007
Florence Shapiro	Republican	8	Plano	1993
Chris Harris	Republican	9	Arlington	1991
Wendy Davis	Democratic	10	Fort Worth	2009
Mike Jackson	Republican	11	La Porte	1999
Jane Nelson	Republican	12	Lewisville	1993
Rodney Ellis	Democratic	13	Houston	1990
Kirk Watson	Democratic	14	Austin	2007
John Whitmire	Democratic	15	Houston	1983
John Carona	Republican	16	Dallas	1996
Joan Huffman	Republican	17	Southside Place	2008
Glenn Hegar	Republican	18	Katy	2007
Carlos I. Uresti	Democratic	19	San Antonio	2006
Juan "Chuy" Hinojosa	Democratic	20	Mission	2002
Judith Zaffirini	Democratic	21	Laredo	1987
Brian Birdwell	Republican	22	Granbury	2010
Royce West	Democratic	23	Dallas	1993
Troy Fraser	Republican	24	Horseshoe Bay	1997
Jeff Wentworth	Republican	25	San Antonio	1993
Leticia Van de Putte	Democratic	26	San Antonio	1999
Eddie Lucio Jr.	Democratic	27	Brownsville	1991
Robert L. Duncan	Republican	28	Lubbock	1997
José R. Rodríguez	Democratic	29	El Paso	2011
Craig Estes	Republican	30	Wichita Falls	2001
Kel Seliger	Republican	31	Amarillo	2004

=== House of Representatives ===
Representative	Party	Home Town/City	District ↑	County
George Lavender	Republican	New Boston	1	Bowie, Cass, Marion, Morris
Dan Flynn	Republican	Canton	2	Rains, Hunt, Van Zandt
Erwin Cain	Republican	Paris	3	Lamar, Hopkins, Delta, Franklin, Titus, Red River
Lance Gooden	Republican	Athens	4	Henderson, Kaufman
Bryan Hughes	Republican	Marshall	5	Camp, Upshur, Wood, Harrison
Leo Berman	Republican	Tyler	6	Smith
David Simpson	Republican	Longview	7	Smith, Gregg
Byron Cook	Republican	Corsicana	8	Anderson, Freestone, Limestone, Navarro
Wayne Christian	Republican	Center	9	Shelby, Nacogdoches, San Augustine, Sabine, Jasper
Jim Pitts	Republican	Waxahachie	10	Ellis, Hill
Chuck Hopson	Republican	Jacksonville	11	Panola, Rusk, Cherokee, Houston
James White	Republican	Lufkin	12	Angelina, San Jacinto, Trinity, Tyler
Lois Kolkhorst	Republican	Brenham	13	Austin, Grimes, Walker, Washington
Fred Brown	Republican	Bryan	14	Brazos
Rob Eissler	Republican	The Woodlands	15	Montgomery
Brandon Creighton	Republican	Conroe	16	Montgomery
Tim Kleinschmidt	Republican	Giddings	17	Bastrop, Brazos, Burleson, Colorado, Fayette, Lee
John Otto	Republican	Dayton	18	Montgomery, Liberty, Polk
Mike "Tuffy" Hamilton	Republican	Mauriceville	19	Hardin, Newton, Orange
Charles Schwertner	Republican	Georgetown	20	Milam, Williamson
Allan Ritter	Republican	Nederland	21	Jefferson
Joe D. Deshotel	Democratic	Port Arthur	22	Jefferson, Orange
Craig Eiland	Democratic	Galveston	23	Chambers, Galveston
Larry Taylor	Republican	League City	24	Galveston
Dennis Bonnen	Republican	Angleton	25	Brazoria
Charles F. Howard	Republican	Sugar Land	26	Fort Bend
Ron Reynolds	Democratic	Missouri City	27	Fort Bend
John Zerwas	Republican	Katy	28	Wharton, Fort Bend, Waller
Randy Weber	Republican	Pearland	29	Brazoria, Matagorda
Geanie Morrison	Republican	Victoria	30	Refugio, Victoria, Jackson, DeWitt, Lavaca
Ryan Guillen	Democratic	Rio Grande	31	Duval, Starr, Webb, Zapata
Todd Ames Hunter	Republican	Portland	32	Calhoun, Aransas, San Patricio, Nueces
Raul Torres	Republican	Corpus Christi	33	Nueces
Connie Scott	Republican	Corpus Christi	34	Nueces
Jose Aliseda	Republican	Beeville	35	Atascosa, Karnes, McMullen, Live Oak, Bee, Jim Wells, Goliad
Ismael "Kino" Flores	Democratic	Mission	36	Hidalgo
René O. Oliveira	Democratic	Brownsville	37	Cameron
Eddie Lucio III	Democratic	San Benito	38	Cameron
Armando Martinez	Democratic	Weslaco	39	Hidalgo
Aaron Peña	Republican	Edinburg	40	Hidalgo
Veronica Gonzales	Democratic	McAllen	41	Hidalgo
Richard Raymond	Democratic	Laredo	42	Webb
José Manuel Lozano	Democratic	Kingsville	43	Jim Hogg, Brooks, Kleberg, Kenedy, Willacy, Cameron
John Kuempel	Republican	Seguin	44	Wilson, Guadalupe, Gonzales
Jason Isaac	Republican	Austin	45	Blanco, Hays, Caldwell
Dawnna Dukes	Democratic	Austin	46	Travis
Paul D. Workman	Republican	Austin	47	Travis
Donna Howard	Democratic	Austin	48	Travis
Elliott Naishtat	Democratic	Austin	49	Travis
Mark Strama	Democratic	Austin	50	Travis
Eddie Rodriguez	Democratic	Austin	51	Travis
Larry Gonzales	Republican	Round Rock	52	Williamson
Harvey Hilderbran	Republican	Kerrville	53	Crockett, Sutton, Schleicher, Real, Kerr, Kimble, Menard, Mason, Llano, San Saba, McCulloch, Concho, Coleman, Runnels, Callahan
Jimmie Don Aycock	Republican	Lampasas	54	Lampasas, Burnet, Bell
Ralph Sheffield	Republican	Temple	55	Bell
Charles "Doc" Anderson	Republican	Waco	56	McLennan
Marva Beck	Republican	Waco	57	McLennan, Falls, Leon, Madison, Robertson
Rob Orr	Republican	Burleson	58	Bosque, Johnson
Sid Miller	Republican	Stephenville	59	Erath, Comanche, Mills, Hamilton, Coryell, Somervell
Jim Keffer	Republican	Eastland	60	Brown, Eastland, Shackelford, Stephens, Palo Pinto, Hood
Phil King	Republican	Weatherford	61	Parker, Wise
Larry Phillips	Republican	Sherman	62	Fannin, Grayson
Tan Parker	Republican	Flower Mound	63	Denton
Myra Crownover	Republican	Lake Dallas	64	Denton
Burt Solomons	Republican	Carrollton	65	Denton
Van Taylor	Republican	Plano	66	Collin
Jerry Madden	Republican	Plano	67	Collin
Rick Hardcastle	Republican	Vernon	68	Motley, Dickens, Cottle, King, Hardeman, Foard, Knox, Haskell, Wilbarger, Baylor, Throckmorton, Young, Jack, Clay, Montague, Cooke
Lanham Lyne	Republican	Wichita Falls	69	Wichita, Archer
Ken Paxton	Republican	McKinney	70	Collin
Susan King	Republican	Abilene	71	Nolan, Taylor
Drew Darby	Republican	San Angelo	72	Coke, Mitchell, Scurry, Tom Green
Doug Miller	Republican	New Braunfels	73	Gillespie, Kendall, Comal, Bandera
Pete Gallego	Democratic	Alpine	74	Uvalde, Edwards, Val Verde, Terrell, Pecos, Brewster, Presidio, Jeff Davis, Ward, Reeves, Loving, Culberson, Hudspeth
Chente Quintanilla	Democratic	El Paso	75	El Paso
Naomi Gonzalez	Democratic	El Paso	76	El Paso
Marisa Marquez	Democratic	El Paso	77	El Paso
Dee Margo	Republican	El Paso	78	El Paso
Joe Pickett	Democratic	El Paso	79	El Paso
Tracy King	Democratic	Eagle Pass	80	Kinney, Maverick, Zavala, Dimmit, La Salle, Frio, Medina
Tryon D. Lewis	Republican	Odessa	81	Andrews, Winkler, Ector
Tom Craddick	Republican	Midland	82	Crane, Upton, Midland, Martin, Dawson
Charles Perry	Republican	Lubbock	83	Lubbock, Hockley, Cochran, Yoakum, Gaines
John Frullo	Republican	Lubbock	84	Lubbock
Jim Landtroop	Republican	Crosbyton	85	Reagan, Irion, Sterling, Glasscock, Howard, Borden, Terry, Lynn, Garza, Crosby, Kent, Stonewall, Fisher, Jones, Hale, Floyd
John T. Smithee	Republican	Amarillo	86	Dallam, Hartley, Oldham, Deaf Smith, Randall
Four Price	Republican	Amarillo	87	Sherman, Moore, Carson, Potter
Warren Chisum	Republican	Pampa	88	Parmer, Bailey, Lamb, Castro, Swisher, Armstrong, Briscoe, Hall, Donley, Collingsworth, Childress, Gray, Wheeler, Hutchison, Roberts, Hemphill, Lipscomb, Ochiltree, Hansford
Jodie Anne Laubenberg	Republican	Rockwall	89	Rockwall, Collin
Lon Burnam	Democratic	Fort Worth	90	Tarrant
Kelly Hancock	Republican	Fort Worth	91	Tarrant
Todd Smith	Republican	Bedford	92	Tarrant
Barbara Nash	Republican	Arlington	93	Tarrant
Diane Patrick	Republican	Arlington	94	Tarrant
Marc Veasey	Democratic	Fort Worth	95	Tarrant
Bill Zedler	Republican	Arlington	96	Tarrant
Mark M. Shelton	Republican	Fort Worth	97	Tarrant
Vicki Truitt	Republican	Southlake	98	Tarrant
Charlie Geren	Republican	River Oaks	99	Tarrant
Eric Johnson	Democratic	Dallas	100	Dallas
Cindy Burkett	Republican	Mesquite	101	Dallas
Stefani Carter	Republican	Dallas	102	Dallas
Rafael Anchia	Democratic	Dallas	103	Dallas
Roberto R. Alonzo	Democratic	Dallas	104	Dallas
Linda Harper-Brown	Republican	Irving	105	Dallas
Rodney E. Anderson	Republican	Grand Prairie	106	Dallas
Kenneth Sheets	Republican	Dallas	107	Dallas
Dan Branch	Republican	Dallas	108	Dallas
Helen Giddings	Democratic	De Soto	109	Dallas
Barbara Mallory Caraway	Democratic	Dallas	110	Dallas
Yvonne Davis	Democratic	Dallas	111	Dallas
Angie Chen Button	Republican	Richardson	112	Dallas
Joe Driver	Republican	Garland	113	Dallas
Will Ford Hartnett	Republican	Dallas	114	Dallas
Jim Jackson	Republican	Carrollton	115	Dallas
Trey Martinez Fischer	Democratic	San Antonio	116	Bexar
John Garza	Republican	San Antonio	117	Bexar
Joe Farias	Democratic	San Antonio	118	Bexar
Roland Gutierrez	Democratic	San Antonio	119	Bexar
Ruth Jones McClendon	Democratic	San Antonio	120	Bexar
Joe Straus	Republican	San Antonio	121	Bexar
Lyle Larson	Republican	San Antonio	122	Bexar
Mike Villarreal	Democratic	San Antonio	123	Bexar
José Menéndez	Democratic	San Antonio	124	Bexar
Joaquin Castro	Democratic	San Antonio	125	Bexar
Patricia Harless	Republican	Spring	126	Harris
Dan Huberty	Republican	Kingwood	127	Harris
Wayne Smith	Republican	Baytown	128	Harris
John E. Davis	Republican	Houston	129	Harris
Allen Fletcher	Republican	Houston	130	Harris
Alma Allen	Democratic	Houston	131	Harris
Bill Callegari	Republican	Houston	132	Harris
Jim Murphy	Republican	Houston	133	Harris
Sarah Davis	Republican	Houston	134	Harris
Gary Elkins	Republican	Houston	135	Harris
Beverly Woolley	Republican	Houston	136	Harris
Scott Hochberg	Democratic	Houston	137	Harris
Dwayne Bohac	Republican	Houston	138	Harris
Sylvester Turner	Democratic	Houston	139	Harris
Armando Walle	Democratic	Houston	140	Harris
Senfronia Thompson	Democratic	Houston	141	Harris
Harold V. Dutton Jr.	Democratic	Houston	142	Harris
Ana Hernandez	Democratic	Houston	143	Harris
Ken Legler	Republican	Pasadena	144	Harris
Carol Alvarado	Democratic	Houston	145	Harris
Borris Miles	Democratic	Houston	146	Harris
Garnet Coleman	Democratic	Houston	147	Harris
Jessica Farrar	Democratic	Houston	148	Harris
Hubert Vo	Democratic	Houston	149	Harris
Debbie Riddle	Republican	Houston	150	Harris

== Legislation ==
The 82nd Legislature's passing of HB-351 and SB-462 reformed Texas' expungement code to include relief for those convicted but later determined to be innocent.
