= 2020 Texas House of Representatives election =

- November 3, 2020

All 150 seats in the Texas House of Representatives 76 seats needed for a majority

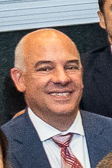
	Majority party	Minority party
Leader	Dennis Bonnen (retired)	Chris Turner
Party	Republican	Democratic
Leader since	January 8, 2019	January 30, 2017
Leader's seat	25th	101st
Seats before	83	67
Seats after	83	67
Seat change	Steady	Steady
Popular vote	5,706,147	4,525,726
Percentage	54.92%	43.56%
Swing	▲2.45%	▼2.97%
- Republican hold Democratic hold Republican gain Democratic gain Republican: 40–50% 50–60% 60–70% 70–80% 80–90% ≥90% Democratic: 40–50% 50–60% 60–70% 70–80% 80–90% ≥90%
Speaker before election
Dennis Bonnen
Republican
Elected Speaker
Dade Phelan
Republican

The 2020 Texas House of Representatives elections took place as part of the biennial United States elections. Texas voters elected state representatives in all 150 of the state house's districts. Primary elections were held in March 2020. The winners of this election served in the 87th Texas Legislature. Two seats changed hands, both in Harris County, one Democratic flip and one Republican flip, for no net change.

== Background ==
In the 2018 election, the Texas Democrats had a net gain of 12 seats from the opposing Texas Republicans.

In 2019, House Speaker Dennis Bonnen announced he would not seek reelection.

In October 2020, The Washington Post identified this state election as one of eight whose outcomes could affect partisan balance during post-census redistricting.

== Predictions ==
Analysts considered the Texas House to be competitive in the 2020 elections, with Republicans holding the advantage. Due to the large number of competitive seats, Democrats had an opening to win control of the chamber for the first time since 2000, but they would have to win almost all of them. Near election day, however, The Cook Political Report shifted their rating for the chamber to "Tossup" due to the heavy amount of early voting taking place in the state's urban areas in the leadup to the election.

Source	Ranking	As of
The Cook Political Report	Tossup	Nov. 2, 2020
Sabato's Crystal Ball	Lean R	May 7, 2020

== Polling ==
House District 26

Poll source	Date(s) administered	Sample size (Note: Key: A – all adults RV – registered voters LV – likely voters V – unclear)	Margin of error	Jacey Jetton (R)	L. Sarah DeMerchant (D)	Undecided
Reform Austin	Released Oct 9, 2020	>400 (LV)	± 4.89%	44%	50%	6%

House District 28

Poll source	Date(s) administered	Sample size	Margin of error	Gary Gates (R)	Elizabeth Markowitz (D)	Undecided
Reform Austin	Released Oct 9, 2020	>400 (LV)	± 4.89%	47%	45%	9%

House District 45

Poll source	Date(s) administered	Sample size	Margin of error	Erin Zweiner (D)	Carrie Issac (R)	Undecided
Reform Austin	Released Oct 9, 2020	>400 (LV)	± 4.89%	54%	39%	7%

House District 54

Poll source	Date(s) administered	Sample size	Margin of error	Brad Buckley (R)	Likeitha Williams (D)	Undecided
Reform Austin	Released Oct 9, 2020	>400 (LV)	± 4.89%	38%	54%	8%

House District 64

Poll source	Date(s) administered	Sample size	Margin of error	Lynn Stucky (R)	Angela Brewer (D)	Undecided
Reform Austin	Released Oct 9, 2020	>400 (LV)	± 4.89%	47%	43%	10%

House District 65

Poll source	Date(s) administered	Sample size	Margin of error	Michelle Beckley (D)	Kronda Thimesch (R)	Undecided
Reform Austin	Released Oct 9, 2020	>400 (LV)	± 4.89%	50%	39%	11%
EMC Research/Kronda Thimesch (R) (Note: Poll sponsored by Beckley's campaign)	Aug 5–9, 2020	400 (LV)	± 4.9%	52%	38%	–

House District 66

Poll source	Date(s) administered	Sample size	Margin of error	Matt Shaheen (R)	Sharon Hirsch (D)	Undecided
Reform Austin	Released Oct 9, 2020	>400 (LV)	± 4.89%	46%	48%	6%

House District 67

Poll source	Date(s) administered	Sample size	Margin of error	Jeff Leach (R)	Lorenzo Sanchez (D)	Undecided
Reform Austin	Released Oct 9, 2020	>400 (LV)	± 4.89%	44%	46%	10%

House District 92

Poll source	Date(s) administered	Sample size	Margin of error	Jeff Cason (R)	Jeff Whitfield (D)	Undecided
Reform Austin	Released Oct 9, 2020	>400 (LV)	± 4.89%	50%	38%	12%

House District 93

Poll source	Date(s) administered	Sample size	Margin of error	Matt Krause (R)	Lydia Bean (D)	Undecided
Reform Austin	Released Oct 9, 2020	>400 (LV)	± 4.89%	46%	45%	9%

House District 94

Poll source	Date(s) administered	Sample size	Margin of error	Tony Tinderholt (R)	Alisa Simmons (D)	Undecided
Reform Austin	Released Oct 9, 2020	>400 (LV)	± 4.89%	43%	45%	12%

House District 96

Poll source	Date(s) administered	Sample size	Margin of error	David Cook (R)	Joe Drago (D)	Undecided
Reform Austin	Released Oct 9, 2020	>400 (LV)	± 4.89%	38%	43%	19%

House District 97

Poll source	Date(s) administered	Sample size	Margin of error	Craig Goldman (R)	Elizabeth Beck (D)	Undecided
Reform Austin	Released Oct 9, 2020	>400 (LV)	± 4.89%	40%	53%	7%

Hypothetical polling in District 97

Generic Democrat vs Generic Republican

Poll source	Date(s) administered	Sample size	Margin of error	Generic Republican	Generic Democrat	Undecided
Public Policy Polling/DLCC (Note: The DLCC exclusively supports Democratic candidates)	September 23–24, 2020	528 (V)	± 4.3%	46%	46%	8%

House District 102

Poll source	Date(s) administered	Sample size	Margin of error	Ana-Maria Ramos (D)	Linda Koop (R)	Undecided
Reform Austin	Released Oct 9, 2020	>400 (LV)	± 4.89%	54%	42%	4%

House District 108

Poll source	Date(s) administered	Sample size	Margin of error	Morgan Meyer (R)	Joanna Cattanach (D)	Undecided
Reform Austin	Released Oct 9, 2020	>400 (LV)	± 4.89%	36%	55%	9%
GQR Research/Joanna Cattanach (D) (Note: Poll sponsored by Cattanach's campaign)	Jul 22–25, 2020	401 (LV)	± 4.9%	43%	48%	–

Hypothetical polling in District 108

Generic Democrat vs Generic Republican

Poll source	Date(s) administered	Sample size	Margin of error	Generic Republican	Generic Democrat	Undecided
Public Policy Polling/DLCC (Note: The DLCC exclusively supports Democratic candidates)	September 23–24, 2020	458 (V)	± 4.6%	41%	51%	7%

House District 112

Poll source	Date(s) administered	Sample size	Margin of error	Angie Chen Button (R)	Brandy Chambers (D)	Undecided
Reform Austin	Released Oct 9, 2020	>400 (LV)	± 4.89%	43%	47%	10%
GQR Research/Brandy for Texas (D) (Note: Poll sponsored by Chambers' campaign)	Jul 6–9, 2020	401 (LV)	± 4.9%	46%	48%	–

House District 113

Poll source	Date(s) administered	Sample size	Margin of error	Will Douglas (R)	Rhetta Bowers (D)
EMC Research/Rhetta Bowers (D) (Note: Poll sponsored by Bowers' campaign)	Jul 29 – Aug 2, 2020	405 (LV)	± 4.9%	36%	53%

House District 121

Poll source	Date(s) administered	Sample size	Margin of error	Steve Allison (R)	Celina Montoya (D)	Undecided
Reform Austin	Released Oct 9, 2020	>400 (LV)	± 4.89%	49%	41%	10%
Lake Research Partners/Ann Johnson (D) (Note: The Texas House Democratic Campaign Committee exclusively supports the election of Democrats in Texas)	Jul 28 – Aug 1, 2020	406 (LV)	± 4.9%	42%	49%	9%

House District 126

Poll source	Date(s) administered	Sample size	Margin of error	Sam Harless (R)	Natali Hurtado (D)	Undecided
Reform Austin	Released Oct 9, 2020	>400 (LV)	± 4.89%	49%	43%	8%
GQR Research/Texas House Democratic Campaign Committee (D)	Jul 27–30, 2020	401 (LV)	± 4.9%	47%	43%	–

House District 132

Poll source	Date(s) administered	Sample size	Margin of error	Gina Calanni (D)	Mike Schofield (R)	Undecided
Reform Austin	Released Oct 9, 2020	>400 (LV)	± 4.89%	50%	40%	10%

House District 134

Poll source	Date(s) administered	Sample size	Margin of error	Sarah Davis (R)	Ann Johnson (D)	Other	Undecided
Reform Austin	Released Oct 9, 2020	>400 (LV)	± 4.89%	31%	57%	–	12%
Lake Research Partners/Ann Johnson (D) (Note: Poll sponsored by Johnson's campaign)	Aug 3–6, 2020	400 (LV)	± 4.9%	42%	44%	13% (Note: "Undecided/no vote" with 13%)	–

House District 135

Poll source	Date(s) administered	Sample size	Margin of error	Jon Rosenthal (D)	Justin Ray (R)	Undecided
Reform Austin	Released Oct 9, 2020	>400 (LV)	± 4.89%	48%	39%	13%

House District 138

Poll source	Date(s) administered	Sample size	Margin of error	Lacey Hull (R)	Akilah Bacy (D)	Undecided
Reform Austin	Released Oct 9, 2020	>400 (LV)	± 4.89%	42%	43%	15%
PPP/TXHDCC (Note: The TXHDCC endorsed Bacy prior to the sampling period)	Oct 6–7, 2020	451 (V)	± 4.6%	45% (Note: With voters who lean towards a given candidate)	54%	1%
GQR Research (D)	Aug 3–7, 2020	400 (LV)	± 4.9%	42%	48%	–

Hypothetical polling in District 138

Poll source	Date(s) administered	Sample size	Margin of error	Generic Republican	Generic Democrat	Undecided
PPP/TXHDCC (Note: The TXHDCC endorsed Bacy prior to the sampling period)	October 6–7, 2020	451 (V)	± 4.6%	43%	52%	–
Public Policy Polling/DLCC (Note: The DLCC exclusively supports Democratic candidates)	September 23–24, 2020	483 (V)	± 4.5%	44%	50%	6%

== Summary of results ==
Summary of the November 3, 2020 Texas House of Representatives election results
Party	Candi- dates	Votes	%	Seats	+/–	%
Republican Party	120	5,706,147	54.91%	83	-	55.33%
Democratic Party	124	4,525,726	43.56%	67	-	44.67%
Libertarian Party	32	156,883	1.51%	0	–	0%
Green Party	2	2,341	0.02%	0	–	0%
Total	278	10,391,097	100.00%	150	–	

Popular vote
Republican	54.91%
Democratic	43.56%
Libertarian	1.51%
Green	0.02%

House seats won
Republican	55.33%
Democratic	44.67%

=== Close races ===
Seats where the margin of victory was under 10%:

1. District 112, 0.33%
2. District 135, 0.40%
3. District 66, 0.98%
4. District 47, 0.99%
5. District 108, 1.62%
6. District 45, 1.06%
7. District 52, 2.96%
8. District 65, 3.02%
9. District 138, 3.28%
10. District 67, 3.42%
11. District 113, 3.54%
12. District 26, 3.58%
13. District 92, 3.67%
14. District 132, 3.75% (gain) (tipping-point district)
15. District 134, 4.54% (gain)
16. District 94, 5.07%
17. District 96, 5.12%
18. District 126, 6.64%
19. District 54, 6.78%
20. District 121, 6.90%
21. District 114, 7.30%
22. District 97, 7.36%
23. District 74, 7.84%
24. District 102, 7.88%
25. District 93, 8.94%
26. District 64, 9.90%

=== Results by district ===
Election results:

District	Democratic		Republican		Others		Total		Result
District	Votes	%	Votes	%	Votes	%	Votes	%	Result
District 1	-	-	59,508	100.00%	-	-	59,508	100.00%	Republican hold
District 2	14,514	18.71%	63,074	81.29%	-	-	77,588	100.00%	Republican hold
District 3	20,625	22.66%	70,385	77.34%	-	-	91,010	100.00%	Republican hold
District 4	-	-	65,903	79.08%	17,437	20.92%	83,340	100.00%	Republican hold
District 5	14,824	20.03%	59,179	79.97%	-	-	74,021	100.00%	Republican hold
District 6	23,426	31.84%	50,143	68.16%	-	-	73,569	100.00%	Republican hold
District 7	-	-	54,726	100.00%	-	-	54,726	100.00%	Republican hold
District 8	-	-	50,433	85.91%	8,271	14.09%	58,704	100.00%	Republican hold
District 9	-	-	62,151	100.00%	-	-	62,151	100.00%	Republican hold
District 10	-	-	65,062	75.83%	20,733	24.17%	85,795	100.00%	Republican hold
District 11	15,965	24.25%	49,864	75.75%	-	-	65,829	100.00%	Republican hold
District 12	-	-	49,785	100.00%	-	-	49,785	100.00%	Republican hold
District 13	-	-	72,890	100.00%	-	-	72,890	100.00%	Republican hold
District 14	26,520	42.47%	35,922	57.53%	-	-	62,442	100.00%	Republican hold
District 15	36,111	33.53%	71,586	66.47%	-	-	107,697	100.00%	Republican hold
District 16	-	-	74,821	100.00%	-	-	74,821	100.00%	Republican hold
District 17	25,881	36.40%	45,219	63.60%	-	-	71,100	100.00%	Republican hold
District 18	-	-	56,026	100.00%	-	-	56,026	100.00%	Republican hold
District 19	-	-	72,573	100.00%	-	-	72,573	100.00%	Republican hold
District 20	31,648	28.63%	78,884	71.37%	-	-	110,532	100.00%	Republican hold
District 21	-	-	65,689	100.00%	-	-	65,689	100.00%	Republican hold
District 22	35,903	68.27%	16,685	31.73%	-	-	52,588	100.00%	Democratic hold
District 23	31,154	39.83%	47,068	60.17%	-	-	78,222	100.00%	Republican hold
District 24	25,848	27.57%	65,560	69.92%	1,994	2.51%	93,764	100.00%	Republican hold
District 25	19,261	28.43%	48,492	71.57%	-	-	67,753	100.00%	Republican hold
District 26	40,436	48.21%	43,438	51.79%	-	-	83,874	100.00%	Republican hold
District 27	56,373	67.81%	26,766	32.19%	-	-	83,139	100.00%	Democratic hold
District 28	53,908	44.73%	66,619	55.27%	-	-	120,527	100.00%	Republican hold
District 29	41,712	43.31%	54,594	56.69%	-	-	96,306	100.00%	Republican hold
District 30	-	-	57,232	100.00%	-	-	57,232	100.00%	Republican hold
District 31	32,235	58.41%	22,950	41.59%	-	-	55,185	100.00%	Democratic hold
District 32	26,925	38.86%	42,357	61.14%	-	-	69,282	100.00%	Republican hold
District 33	41,827	35.05%	77,503	64.95%	-	-	119,330	100.00%	Republican hold
District 34	32,720	59.49%	22,284	40.51%	-	-	55,004	100.00%	Democratic hold
District 35	31,195	100.00%	-	-	-	-	31,195	100.00%	Democratic hold
District 36	36,564	100.00%	-	-	-	-	36,564	100.00%	Democratic hold
District 37	27,650	100.00%	-	-	-	-	27,650	100.00%	Democratic hold
District 38	35,492	100.00%	-	-	-	-	35,492	100.00%	Democratic hold
District 39	36,860	100.00%	-	-	-	-	36,860	100.00%	Democratic hold
District 40	34,576	100.00%	-	-	-	-	34,576	100.00%	Democratic hold
District 41	32,097	57.87%	23,366	42.13%	-	-	55,463	100.00%	Democratic hold
District 42	35,709	100.00%	-	-	-	-	35,709	100.00%	Democratic hold
District 43	-	-	45,357	100.00%	-	-	45,357	100.00%	Republican hold
District 44	29,433	29.48%	67,308	67.42%	3,100	3.10%	70,957	100.00%	Republican hold
District 45	57,383	50.53%	56,175	49.47%	-	-	113,558	100.00%	Democratic hold
District 46	62,064	100.00%	-	-	-	-	62,064	100.00%	Democratic hold
District 47	66,816	49.27%	65,474	48.28%	3,311	2.44%	135,601	100.00%	Democratic hold
District 48	73,590	70.10%	31,382	29.90%	-	-	104,972	100.00%	Democratic hold
District 49	80,258	78.85%	18,277	17.96%	3,248	3.19%	34,170	100.00%	Democratic hold
District 50	63,449	68.78%	28,805	31.22%	-	-	92,254	100.00%	Democratic hold
District 51	59,257	82.66%	12,431	17.34%	-	-	71,688	100.00%	Democratic hold
District 52	50,520	51.48%	47,611	48.52%	-	-	98,131	100.00%	Democratic hold
District 53	18,713	21.80%	67,127	78.20%	-	-	85,840	100.00%	Republican hold
District 54	33,918	46.61%	38,853	53.39%	-	-	72,771	100.00%	Republican hold
District 55	-	-	54,733	100.00%	-	-	54,733	100.00%	Republican hold
District 56	23,833	32.71%	49,030	67.29%	-	-	72,863	100.00%	Republican hold
District 57	13,946	20.55%	53,930	79.45%	-	-	67,876	100.00%	Republican hold
District 58	16,489	20.96%	62,176	79.04%	-	-	78,665	100.00%	Republican hold
District 59	-	-	53,825	100.00%	-	-	53,825	100.00%	Republican hold
District 60	-	-	75,270	100.00%	-	-	75,270	100.00%	Republican hold
District 61	14,940	14.16%	87,526	82.95%	3,049	2.89%	105,515	100.00%	Republican hold
District 62	16,074	21.41%	59,020	78.59%	-	-	75,094	100.00%	Republican hold
District 63	35,426	32.58%	73,297	67.42%	-	-	108,723	100.00%	Republican hold
District 64	39,504	45.05%	48,188	54.95%	-	-	68,626	100.00%	Republican hold
District 65	40,529	51.51%	38,156	48.49%	-	-	78,685	100.00%	Democratic hold
District 66	41,879	48.58%	42,728	49.56%	1,600	1.86%	86,207	100.00%	Republican hold
District 67	45,867	48.29%	49,113	51.71%	-	-	94,980	100.00%	Republican hold
District 68	9,630	14.53%	56,656	85.47%	-	-	66,286	100.00%	Republican hold
District 69	-	-	49,731	100.00%	-	-	49,731	100.00%	Republican hold
District 70	47,343	38.15%	76,754	61.85%	-	-	124,097	100.00%	Republican hold
District 71	13,783	21.15%	51,376	78.85%	-	-	65,159	100.00%	Republican hold
District 72	-	-	54,898	100.00%	-	-	45,898	100.00%	Republican hold
District 73	32,091	25.17%	95,385	74.83%	-	-	127,476	100.00%	Republican hold
District 74	26,131	53.92%	22,334	46.08%	-	-	48,465	100.00%	Democratic hold
District 75	46,455	100.00%	-	-	-	-	46,455	100.00%	Democratic hold
District 76	36,199	100.00%	-	-	-	-	36,199	100.00%	Democratic hold
District 77	34,659	100.00%	-	-	-	-	34,659	100.00%	Democratic hold
District 78	38,876	61.65%	24,180	38.35%	-	-	63,056	100.00%	Democratic hold
District 79	42,667	100.00%	-	-	-	-	42,667	100.00%	Democratic hold
District 80	37,792	100.00%	-	-	-	-	37,792	100.00%	Democratic hold
District 81	-	-	48,239	100.00%	-	-	48,239	100.00%	Republican hold
District 82	-	-	61,068	100.00%	-	-	61,068	100.00%	Republican hold
District 83	16,185	20.71%	61,959	79.29%	-	-	78,144	100.00%	Republican hold
District 84	22,208	38.78%	35,066	61.22%	-	-	57,274	100.00%	Republican hold
District 85	31,372	41.15%	43,024	56.44%	1,838	2.41%	76,234	100.00%	Republican hold
District 86	-	-	67,985	100.00%	-	-	67,985	100.00%	Republican hold
District 87	-	-	44,412	100.00%	-	-	44,412	100.00%	Republican hold
District 88	-	-	45,771	100.00%	-	-	45,771	100.00%	Republican hold
District 89	37,837	38.45%	58,102	59.04%	2,466	2.51%	74,648	100.00%	Republican hold
District 90	25,329	72.40%	9,656	27.60%	-	-	34,985	100.00%	Democratic hold
District 91	25,521	36.13%	45,108	63.87%	-	-	70,629	100.00%	Republican hold
District 92	36,996	47.20%	39,875	50.87%	1,513	1.93%	78,384	100.00%	Republican hold
District 93	38,339	45.53%	45,876	54.47%	-	-	84,215	100.00%	Republican hold
District 94	34,757	45.90%	38,602	50.97%	2,371	3.13%	75,730	100.00%	Republican hold
District 95	46,120	100.00%	-	-	-	-	46,120	100.00%	Democratic hold
District 96	40,550	46.10%	45,053	51.22%	2,362	2.69%	87,965	100.00%	Republican hold
District 97	37,707	45.19%	43,852	52.55%	1,884	2.26%	66,125	100.00%	Republican hold
District 98	33,867	32.15%	71,459	67.85%	-	-	105,326	100.00%	Republican hold
District 99	-	-	62,554	100.00%	-	-	62,554	100.00%	Republican hold
District 100	45,550	100.00%	-	-	-	-	45,550	100.00%	Democratic hold
District 101	45,531	100.00%	-	-	-	-	45,531	100.00%	Democratic hold
District 102	37,219	53.94%	31,785	46.06%	-	-	69,004	100.00%	Democratic hold
District 103	37,908	74.56%	12,934	25.44%	-	-	50,842	100.00%	Democratic hold
District 104	35,710	100.00%	-	-	-	-	35,710	100.00%	Democratic hold
District 105	31,502	54.96%	24,087	42.03%	1,724	3.01%	57,313	100.00%	Democratic hold
District 106	52,257	41.49%	73,692	58.51%	-	-	125,949	100.00%	Republican hold
District 107	34,940	56.50%	26,906	43.50%	-	-	61,846	100.00%	Democratic hold
District 108	48,590	48.03%	50,229	49.65%	2,340	2.31%	101,159	100.00%	Republican hold
District 109	64,145	83.28%	12,880	16.72%	-	-	77,025	100.00%	Democratic hold
District 110	37,214	100.00%	-	-	-	-	37,214	100.00%	Democratic hold
District 111	59,450	100.00%	-	-	-	-	59,450	100.00%	Democratic hold
District 112	33,537	48.59%	33,759	48.92%	1,719	2.49%	69,015	100.00%	Republican hold
District 113	35,627	51.77%	33,194	48.23%	-	-	68,821	100.00%	Democratic hold
District 114	42,842	53.65%	37,014	46.35%	-	-	79,856	100.00%	Democratic hold
District 115	40,961	56.90%	31,026	43.10%	-	-	71,987	100.00%	Democratic hold
District 116	41,426	69.12%	18,510	30.88%	-	-	59,936	100.00%	Democratic hold
District 117	50,092	54.85%	37,711	41.29%	3,518	3.85%	91,321	100.00%	Democratic hold
District 118	33,230	56.75%	23,376	39.92%	1,952	3.33%	58,558	100.00%	Democratic hold
District 119	37,574	61.67%	21,154	34.72%	828	1.36%	60,926	100.00%	Democratic hold
District 120	40,004	65.81%	18,830	30.98%	1,950	3.21%	60,784	100.00%	Democratic hold
District 121	43,863	46.55%	50,367	53.45%	-	-	94,230	100.00%	Republican hold
District 122	50,195	40.37%	74,149	59.63%	-	-	124,344	100.00%	Republican hold
District 123	3 (Note: According to the secretary of state, this race was not included in the ballot because this candidate ran unopposed.)	100.00%	-	-	-	-	3	100.00%	Democratic hold
District 124	3	100.00%	-	-	-	-	3	100.00%	Democratic hold
District 125	45,500	79.80%	-	-	11,515	20.20%	57,015	100.00%	Democratic hold
District 126	34,538	46.68%	39,457	53.32%	-	-	73,995	100.00%	Republican hold
District 127	-	-	60,599	70.26%	25,653	29.74%	86,252	100.00%	Republican hold
District 128	22,569	31.61%	48,831	68.39%	-	-	71,400	100.00%	Republican hold
District 129	34,823	41.07%	49,972	58.93%	-	-	84,795	100.00%	Republican hold
District 130	32,229	31.00%	71,722	69.00%	-	-	103,951	100.00%	Republican hold
District 131	47,790	100.00%	-	-	-	-	47,790	100.00%	Democratic Hold
District 132	48,514	48.07%	52,299	51.82%	116	0.11%	100,929	100.00%	Republican gain
District 133	36,550	41.15%	50,785	57.17%	1,490	1.68%	88,825	100.00%	Republican hold
District 134	56,895	52.27%	51,960	47.73%	-	-	108,855	100.00%	Democratic gain
District 135	36,760	49.06%	36,460	48.66%	1,703	2.27%	74,923	100.00%	Democratic hold
District 136	53,887	53.31%	43,533	43.07%	3,653	3.61%	101,073	100.00%	Democratic hold
District 137	23,502	81.48%	-	-	5,342	18.52%	28,844	100.00%	Democratic hold
District 138	30,982	48.36%	33,081	51.64%	-	-	64,063	100.00%	Republican hold
District 139	48,841	85.88%	-	-	8,029	14.12%	56,870	100.00%	Democratic hold
District 140	25,989	100.00%	-	-	-	-	25,989	100.00%	Democratic hold
District 141	38,529	100.00%	-	-	-	-	38,529	100.00%	Democratic hold
District 142	42,127	74.77%	14,213	25.23%	-	-	56,340	100.00%	Democratic hold
District 143	30,460	100.00%	-	-	-	-	30,460	100.00%	Democratic hold
District 144	17,516	56.42%	13,528	43.58%	-	-	31,044	100.00%	Democratic hold
District 145	27,415	64.01%	14,445	33.73%	970	2.26%	42,830	100.00%	Democratic hold
District 146	45,151	87.04%	-	-	6,723	12.96%	51,874	100.00%	Democratic hold
District 147	58,763	100.00%	-	-	-	-	58,763	100.00%	Democratic hold
District 148	38,287	63.67%	21,844	36.33%	-	-	60,131	100.00%	Democratic hold
District 149	31,919	59.42%	21,799	40.58%	-	-	53,718	100.00%	Democratic hold
District 150	37,466	38.55%	56,512	58.15%	3,206	3.30%	97,184	100.00%	Republican hold
Total	4,525,726	43.56%	5,706,147	54.92%	157,608	1.52%	10,389,481	100.00%	

== Detailed results ==
=== Districts 1-9 ===
1st District
Party	Candidate	Votes	%
Republican	Gary VanDeaver (incumbent)	59,508	100.0
Total votes		59,508	100.0

2nd District
Party	Candidate	Votes	%
Republican	Bryan Slaton	63,074	81.29
Democratic	Bill Brannon	14,514	18.71
Total votes		77,588	100.0
Republican hold			

3rd District
Party	Candidate	Votes	%
Republican	Cecil Bell Jr. (incumbent)	70,385	77.34
Democratic	Martin Shupp	20,625	22.66
Total votes		91,010	100.0
Republican hold			

4th District
Party	Candidate	Votes	%
Republican	Keith Bell (incumbent)	65,903	79.08
Libertarian	K. Nicole Sprabary	17,437	20.92
Total votes		83,340	100.0
Republican hold			

5th District
Party	Candidate	Votes	%
Republican	Cole Hefner (incumbent)	59,197	79.97
Democratic	Lawyanda Prince	14,824	20.03
Total votes		74,021	100.0
Republican hold			

6th District
Party	Candidate	Votes	%
Republican	Matt Schaefer (incumbent)	50,143	68.16
Democratic	Julie Gobble	23,426	31.84
Total votes		73,569	100.0
Republican hold			

7th District
Party	Candidate	Votes	%
Republican	Jay Dean (incumbent)	54,726	100.0
Total votes		54,726	100.0
Republican hold			

8th District
Party	Candidate	Votes	%
Republican	Cody Harris (incumbent)	50,433	85.91
Libertarian	R. Edwin Adams	8,271	14.09
Total votes		58,704	100.0
Republican hold			

9th District
Party	Candidate	Votes	%
Republican	Chris Paddie (incumbent)	62,151	100.0
Total votes		62,151	100.0
Republican hold			

=== Districts 10-19 ===
10th District
Party	Candidate	Votes	%
Republican	Jake Ellzey	65,062	75.83
Libertarian	Matt Savino	20,733	24.17
Total votes		85,795	100.0
Republican hold			

11th District
Party	Candidate	Votes	%
Republican	Travis Clardy (incumbent)	49,864	75.75
Democratic	Alec Johnson	15,965	24.25
Total votes		65,829	100.0
Republican hold			

12th District
Party	Candidate	Votes	%
Republican	Kyle Kacal (incumbent)	49,785	100.0
Total votes		49,785	100.0
Republican hold			

13th District
Party	Candidate	Votes	%
Republican	Ben Leman (incumbent)	72,890	100.0
Total votes		72,890	100.0
Republican hold			

14th District
Party	Candidate	Votes	%
Republican	John N. Raney (incumbent)	35,922	57.53
Democratic	Janet Dudding	26,520	42.47
Total votes		62,442	100.0
Republican hold			

15th District
Party	Candidate	Votes	%
Republican	Steve Toth (incumbent)	71,586	66.47
Democratic	Lorena Perez McGill	36,111	33.53
Total votes		107,697	100.0
Republican hold			

16th District
Party	Candidate	Votes	%
Republican	Will Metcalf (incumbent)	74,821	100.0
Total votes		74,821	100.0
Republican hold			

17th District
Party	Candidate	Votes	%
Republican	John P. Cyrier (incumbent)	45,219	63.6
Democratic	Madeline Eden	25,881	36.4
Total votes		71,100	100.0
Republican hold			

18th District
Party	Candidate	Votes	%
Republican	Ernest Bailes (incumbent)	56,026	100.0
Total votes		56,026	100.0
Republican hold			

19th District
Party	Candidate	Votes	%
Republican	James White (incumbent)	72,573	100.0
Total votes		72,573	100.0
Republican hold			

=== Districts 20-29 ===
20th District
Party	Candidate	Votes	%
Republican	Terry M. Wilson (incumbent)	78,884	71.37
Democratic	Jessica Tiedt	31,648	28.63
Total votes		110,532	100.0
Republican hold			

21st District
Party	Candidate	Votes	%
Republican	Dade Phelan (incumbent)	65,689	100.0
Total votes		65,689	100.0
Republican hold			

22nd District
Party	Candidate	Votes	%
Democratic	Joe Deshotel (incumbent)	35,903	68.27
Republican	Jacorion Randle	14,676	31.73
Total votes		52,588	100.0
Democratic hold			

23rd District
Party	Candidate	Votes	%
Republican	Mayes Middleton (incumbent)	47,068	60.17
Democratic	Jeff Antonelli	31,154	39.83
Total votes		78,222	100.0
Republican hold			

24th District
Party	Candidate	Votes	%
Republican	Greg Bonnen (incumbent)	65,560	69.92
Democratic	Brian J. Rogers	25,848	27.57
Libertarian	Dick Illyes	2,356	2.51
Total votes		93,764	100.0
Republican hold			

25th District
Party	Candidate	Votes	%
Republican	Cody Vasut	48,482	71.57
Democratic	Patrick Henry	19,261	28.43
Total votes		67,753	100.0
Republican hold			

26th District
Party	Candidate	Votes	%
Republican	Jacey Jetton	43,438	51.79
Democratic	Sarah DeMarchant	40,436	48.21
Total votes		83,874	100.0
Republican hold			

27th District
Party	Candidate	Votes	%
Democratic	Ron Reynolds (incumbent)	56,373	67.81
Republican	Tom Virippan	26,766	32.19
Total votes		83,139	100.0
Democratic hold			

28th District
Party	Candidate	Votes	%
Republican	Gary Gates (incumbent)	66,619	55.27
Democratic	Elizabeth Markowitz	53,908	44.73%
Total votes		120,527	100.0
Republican hold			

29th District
Party	Candidate	Votes	%
Republican	Ed Thompson (incumbent)	54,594	56.69
Democratic	Travis Boldt	41,712	43.31
Total votes		96,306	100.0
Republican hold			

=== Districts 30-39 ===
30th District
Party	Candidate	Votes	%
Republican	Geanie Morrison (incumbent)	57,232	100.0
Total votes		57,232	100.0
Republican hold			

31st District
Party	Candidate	Votes	%
Democratic	Ryan Guillen (incumbent)	32,235	58.41
Republican	Marian Knowlton	22,950	41.59
Total votes		55,185	100.0
Democratic hold			

32nd District
Party	Candidate	Votes	%
Republican	Todd Ames Hunter (incumbent)	42,357	61.14
Democratic	Eric Holguin	26,925	38.86
Total votes		69,282	100.0
Republican hold			

33rd District
Party	Candidate	Votes	%
Republican	Justin Holland (incumbent)	77,503	64.95
Democratic	Andy Rose	41,827	35.05
Total votes		119,330	100.0
Republican hold			

34th District
Party	Candidate	Votes	%
Democratic	Abel Herrero (incumbent)	32,720	59.49
Republican	James Hernandez	22,284	40.51
Total votes		55,004	100.0
Democratic hold			

35th District
Party	Candidate	Votes	%
Democratic	Oscar Longoria (incumbent)	31,195	100.0
Total votes		31,195	100.0
Democratic hold			

36th District
Party	Candidate	Votes	%
Democratic	Sergio Muñoz Jr. (incumbent)	36,564	100.0
Total votes		36,564	100.0
Democratic hold			

37th District
Party	Candidate	Votes	%
Democratic	Alex Dominguez (incumbent)	27,650	100.0
Total votes		27,650	100.0
Democratic hold			

38th District
Party	Candidate	Votes	%
Democratic	Eddie Lucio III (incumbent)	35,492	100.0
Total votes		35,492	100.0
Democratic hold			

39th District
Party	Candidate	Votes	%
Democratic	Armando Martinez (incumbent)	36,860	100.0
Total votes		36,860	100.0
Democratic hold			

=== Districts 40-49 ===
40th District
Party	Candidate	Votes	%
Democratic	Terry Canales (incumbent)	34,576	100.0
Total votes		34,576	100.0
Democratic hold			

41st District
Party	Candidate	Votes	%
Democratic	Robert 'Bobby' Guerra (incumbent)	32,097	57.87
Republican	John Robert 'Doc' Guerra	23,366	42.13
Total votes		55,463	100.0
Democratic hold			

42nd District
Party	Candidate	Votes	%
Democratic	Richard Peña Raymond (incumbent)	35,709	100.0
Total votes		35,709	100.0
Democratic hold			

43rd District
Party	Candidate	Votes	%
Republican	Jose Manuel Lozano Jr. (incumbent)	45,357	100.0
Total votes		45,357	100.0
Republican hold			

44th District
Party	Candidate	Votes	%
Republican	John Kuempel (incumbent)	67,308	67.42
Democratic	Robert Bohmfalk	29,433	29.48
Libertarian	Julian Mardock	3,100	3.10
Total votes		99,841	100.0
Republican hold			

45th District
Party	Candidate	Votes	%
Democratic	Erin Zwiener (incumbent)	57,383	50.53
Republican	Carrie Isaac	56,175	49.47
Total votes		113,558	100.0
Democratic hold			

46th District
Party	Candidate	Votes	%
Democratic	Sheryl Cole (incumbent)	62,064	100.0
Total votes		62,064	100.0
Democratic hold			

47th District
Party	Candidate	Votes	%
Democratic	Vikki Goodwin (incumbent)	63,703	49.27
Republican	Justin Berry	59,218	48.28
Libertarian	Michael Clark	3,311	2.44
Total votes		135,601	100.0
Democratic hold			

48th District
Party	Candidate	Votes	%
Democratic	Donna Howard (incumbent)	69,948	70.10
Republican	Bill Strieber	31,382	29.90
Total votes		104,972	100.0
Democratic hold			

49th District
Party	Candidate	Votes	%
Democratic	Gina Hinojosa (incumbent)	80,258	78.85
Republican	Charles Allan Meyer	18,277	17.96
Libertarian	Kenneth M. Moore	3,248	3.19
Total votes		101,783	100.0
Democratic hold			

=== Districts 50-59 ===
50th District
Party	Candidate	Votes	%
Democratic	Celia Israel (incumbent)	63,449	68.78
Republican	Larry Delarose	28,805	31.22
Total votes		92,254	100.0
Democratic hold			

51st District
Party	Candidate	Votes	%
Democratic	Eddie Rodriguez (incumbent)	59,257	82.66
Republican	Robert Reynolds	12,431	17.34
Total votes		71,688	100.0
Democratic hold			

52nd District
Party	Candidate	Votes	%
Democratic	James Talarico (incumbent)	50,520	51.48
Republican	Lucio Valdez	47,611	48.52
Total votes		98,131	100.0
Democratic hold			

53rd District
Party	Candidate	Votes	%
Republican	Andrew Murr (incumbent)	67,127	78.20
Democratic	Joe P. Herrera	18,713	21.80
Total votes		85,840	100.0
Republican hold			

54th District
Party	Candidate	Votes	%
Republican	Brad Buckley (incumbent)	38,853	53.39
Democratic	Likeithia "Keke" Williams	33,918	46.61
Total votes		72,771	100.0
Republican hold			

55th District
Party	Candidate	Votes	%
Republican	Hugh Shine (incumbent)	42,390	100.0
Total votes		42,390	100.0
Republican hold			

56th District
Party	Candidate	Votes	%
Republican	Charles "Doc" Anderson (incumbent)	49,030	67.29
Democratic	Katherine Turner-Pearson	23,833	32.71
Total votes		72,863	100.0
Republican hold			

57th District
Party	Candidate	Votes	%
Republican	Trent Ashby (incumbent)	53,930	79.45
Democratic	Jason Rogers	13,946	20.55
Total votes		67,876	100.0
Republican hold			

58th District
Party	Candidate	Votes	%
Republican	DeWayne Burns (incumbent)	62,176	79.04
Democratic	Cindy Rocha	16,489	20.96
Total votes		78,665	100.0
Republican hold			

59th District
Party	Candidate	Votes	%
Republican	Shelby Slawson	53,825	100.0
Total votes		53,825	100.0
Republican hold			

=== Districts 60-69 ===
60th District
Party	Candidate	Votes	%
Republican	Glenn Rogers (incumbent)	75,270	100.0
Total votes		75,270	100.0
Republican hold			

61st District
Party	Candidate	Votes	%
Republican	Phil King (incumbent)	87,526	82.95
Democratic	Christopher Cox	14,940	14.16
Libertarian	J. K. Stephenson	3,049	2.89
Total votes		105,515	100.0
Republican hold			

62nd District
Party	Candidate	Votes	%
Republican	Reggie Smith (incumbent)	59,020	78.59
Democratic	Gary D. Thomas	16,074	21.41
Total votes		75,094	100.0
Republican hold			

63rd District
Party	Candidate	Votes	%
Republican	Tan Parker (incumbent)	73,297	67.42
Democratic	Leslie Peeler	35,426	32.58
Total votes		108,723	100.0
Republican hold			

64th District
Party	Candidate	Votes	%
Republican	Lynn Stucky (incumbent)	48,188	54.95
Democratic	Angela Brewer	39,504	45.05
Total votes		87,692	100.0
Republican hold			

65th District
Party	Candidate	Votes	%
Democratic	Michelle Beckley (incumbent)	40,529	51.51
Republican	Kronda Thimesch	38,156	48.49
Total votes		78,685	100.0
Democratic hold			

66th District
Party	Candidate	Votes	%
Republican	Matt Shaheen (incumbent)	42,728	49.56
Democratic	Sharon Hirsch	41,879	48.58
Libertarian	Shawn Jones	1,600	1.86
Total votes		86,207	100.0
Republican hold			

67th District
Party	Candidate	Votes	%
Republican	Jeff Leach (incumbent)	49,113	51.71
Democratic	Lorenzo Sanchez	45,867	48.29
Total votes		94,980	100.0
Republican hold			

68th District
Party	Candidate	Votes	%
Republican	Drew Springer (incumbent)	56,656	85.47
Democratic	Patsy Ledbetter	9,630	14.53
Total votes		66,286	100.0
Republican hold			

69th District
Party	Candidate	Votes	%
Republican	James B. Frank (incumbent)	49,731	100.0
Total votes		49,731	100.0
Republican hold			

== See also ==
- 2020 Texas elections

== Notes ==
Partisan clients
