= 2022 Texas lieutenant gubernatorial election =

- November 8, 2022
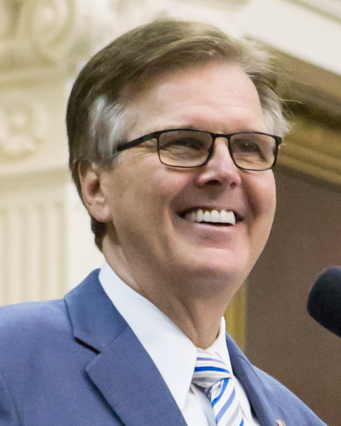

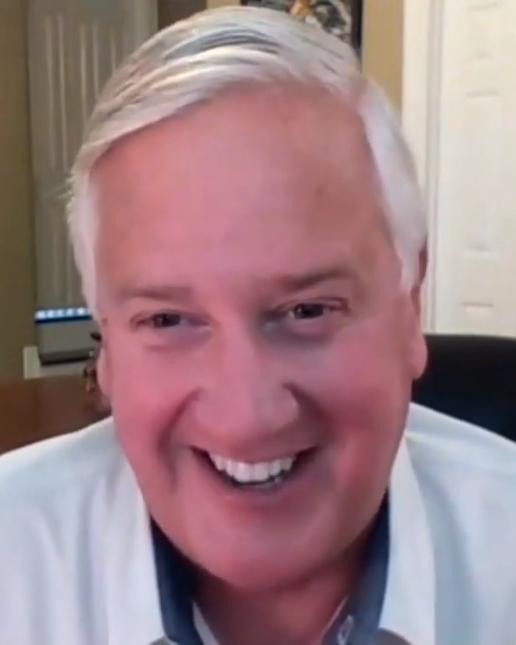
Nominee	Dan Patrick	Mike Collier
Party	Republican	Democratic
Popular vote	4,317,692	3,492,544
Percentage	53.75%	43.48%
- Patrick: 40–50% 50–60% 60–70% 70–80% 80–90% >90% Collier: 40–50% 50–60% 60–70% 70–80% 80–90% >90% Tie: 40–50% 50% No data
Lieutenant Governor before election
Dan Patrick
Republican
Elected Lieutenant Governor
Dan Patrick
Republican

The 2022 Texas lieutenant gubernatorial election was held on November 8, 2022, to elect the lieutenant governor of the state of Texas. The election coincided with various other federal and state elections, including for governor of Texas. Primary elections were held on March 1, with runoffs being held on May 24 for instances in which no candidate received a majority of the initial vote. Texas is one of 21 states that elects its lieutenant governor separately from its governor.

Incumbent Republican lieutenant governor Dan Patrick won re-election to a third term, defeating Democratic nominee Mike Collier in a rematch of the 2018 election.

== Republican primary ==
=== Candidates ===
==== Nominee ====
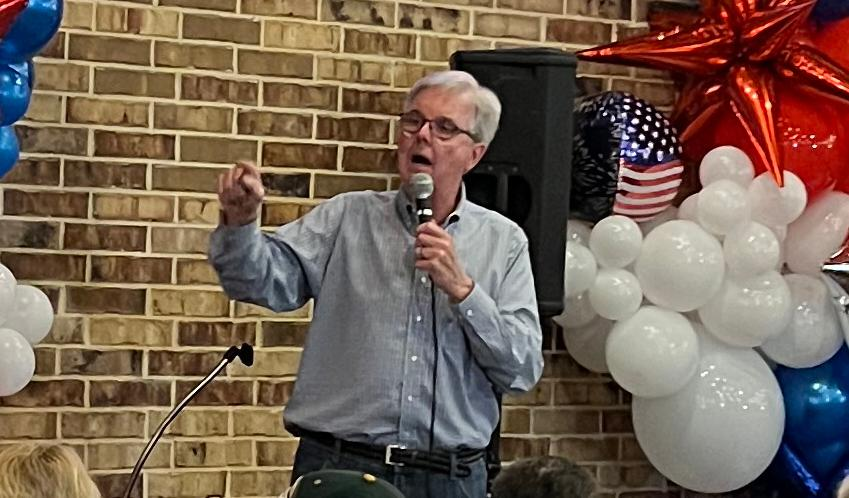
Lt. Gov Dan Patrick of Texas speaking to the Montgomery County Texas Tea Party in The Woodlands, Texas on November 7, 2022.

- Dan Patrick, incumbent lieutenant governor

==== Eliminated in primary ====
- Trayce Bradford, activist
- Todd Bullis, businessman and anti-abortion activist
- Daniel Miller, president of the Texas Nationalist Movement
- Aaron Sorrells, businessman
- Zach Vance, retired military

=== Endorsements ===
Dan Patrick

U.S. Executive Branch officials

- Donald Trump, 45th President of the United States (2017–2021)

=== Polling ===
Poll source	Date(s) administered	Sample size (Note: Key: A – all adults RV – registered voters LV – likely voters V – unclear)	Margin of error	Trayce Bradford	Todd Bullis	Daniel Miller	Dan Patrick	Aaron Sorrells	Zach Vance	Other	Undecided
UT Tyler	February 8–15, 2022	579 (LV)	± 4.4%	3%	2%	4%	54%	2%	3%	–	31%
YouGov/UT	January 28 – February 7, 2022	375 (LV)	± 5.1%	2%	1%	6%	82%	2%	4%	3%	–
UT Tyler	January 18–25, 2022	514 (LV)	± 5.1%	3%	3%	2%	42%	1%	1%	–	48%
YouGov/UH	January 14–24, 2022	490 (LV)	± 3.7%	1%	2%	4%	52%	3%	2%	–	36%
YouGov/UT/TT	October 22–31, 2021	554 (RV)	± 4.2%	–	–	–	56%	–	–	9%	36%

=== Results ===
Republican primary results
Party	Candidate	Votes	%
Republican	Dan Patrick (incumbent)	1,425,717	76.6%
Republican	Daniel Miller	127,735	6.9%
Republican	Trayce Bradford	120,514	6.5%
Republican	Aaron Sorrells	73,031	3.9%
Republican	Zach Vance	70,863	3.8%
Republican	Todd M. Bullis	43,097	2.3%
Total votes		1,860,957	100.0%

== Democratic primary ==
=== Candidates ===
==== Nominee ====
- Mike Collier, finance chair of the Texas Democratic Party and nominee for comptroller in 2014 and lieutenant governor in 2018

==== Eliminated in runoff ====
- Michelle Beckley, state representative from the 65th district

==== Eliminated in primary ====
- Carla Brailey, vice chair of the Texas Democratic Party

==== Withdrawn ====
- Matthew Dowd, political consultant, ABC News contributor, and former staffer to U.S. Senator Lloyd Bentsen

=== Endorsements ===
Mike Collier

U.S. Representatives

- Lloyd Doggett, U.S. Representative for Texas's 35th congressional district (1995–present)
- Veronica Escobar, U.S. Representative for Texas's 16th congressional district (2019–present)
- Lizzie Fletcher, U.S. Representative for Texas's 7th congressional district (2019–present)

State legislators

- Rafael Anchía, state representative from the 103rd district (2005–present)
- John Bucy III, state representative from the 136th district (2019–present)
- Terry Canales, state representative from the 40th district (2013–present)
- Alex Dominguez, state representative from the 37th district (2019–present)
- Ana Hernandez, state representative from the 143rd district (2005–present)
- Donna Howard, state representative from the 48th district (2006–present)
- Ann Johnson, state representative from the 134th district (2021–present)
- Armando Martinez, state representative from the 39th district (2005–present)
- Terry Meza, state representative from the 105th district (2019–present)
- Joe Moody, state representative from the 78th district (2009–2011; 2013–present)
- Victoria Neave, state representative from the 107th district (2017–present)
- Ron Reynolds, state representative from the 27th district (2011–present)
- Eddie Rodriguez, state representative from the 51st district (2003–present)
- Jon Rosenthal, state representative from the 135th district (2019–present)
- Kel Selinger, state senator from the 31st district (2004–2023) (Republican)
- James Talarico, state representative from the 52nd district (2018–present)
- Armando Walle, state representative from the 140th district (2009–present)
- Gene Wu, state representative from the 137th district (2013–present)

Local officials

- Glen Whitley, county judge from Tarrant County (2007–2022) (Republican)

Labor unions

- Texas AFL–CIO

Organizations

- Planned Parenthood Texas Votes
- Stonewall Democrats

Newspapers and other media

- Austin American-Statesman (Democratic primary only)
- The Austin Chronicle (Democratic primary only)
- The Dallas Morning News (Democratic primary only)
- Houston Chronicle (Democratic primary only)
- San Antonio Express-News (Democratic primary only)
Carla Brailey

Newspapers and other media

- Fort Worth Star-Telegram
Michelle Beckley

Labor unions

- AFL–CIO

Organizations

- 314 Action
- Annie's List
- Equality Texas
- Planned Parenthood

=== First round ===
==== Polling ====
Graphical summary

Poll source	Date(s) administered	Sample size	Margin of error	Michelle Beckley	Carla Brailey	Mike Collier	Matthew Dowd	Other	Undecided
UT Tyler	February 8–15, 2022	479 (LV)	± 4.9%	18%	15%	21%	–	–	46%
YouGov/UT	January 28 – February 7, 2022	336 (LV)	± 5.4%	27%	23%	46%	–	4%	–
UT Tyler	January 18–25, 2022	458 (LV)	± 5.4%	17%	11%	13%	–	–	59%
YouGov/UH	January 14–24, 2022	616 (LV)	± 3.3%	10%	10%	21%	–	–	59%
	December 7, 2021	Dowd withdraws from the race							
UT Tyler	November 9–16, 2021	468 (LV)	± 4.9%	–	–	35%	20%	29%	16%
YouGov/UT/TT	October 22–31, 2021	436 (RV)	± 4.7%	–	–	17%	13%	4%	67%
YouGov/TXHPF	October 14–27, 2021	– (LV)	–	–	–	26%	16%	–	58%

==== Results ====
Democratic primary results
Party	Candidate	Votes	%
Democratic	Mike Collier	422,379	41.7%
Democratic	Michelle Beckley	304,799	30.1%
Democratic	Carla Brailey	285,342	28.2%
Total votes		1,012,520	100.0%

=== Runoff ===
==== Polling ====
Poll source	Date(s) administered	Sample size	Margin of error	Michelle Beckley	Mike Collier	Undecided
UT Tyler	May 2–10, 2022	501 (LV)	± 4.9%	31%	19%	50%
YouGov/TXHPF	March 18–28, 2022	435 (LV)	± 4.7%	31%	43%	26%

==== Results ====
Democratic primary runoff results
Party	Candidate	Votes	%
Democratic	Mike Collier	265,345	54.8%
Democratic	Michelle Beckley	218,727	45.2%
Total votes		484,072	100.0%

== Libertarian convention ==
=== Nominee ===
- Shanna Steele, college student and former federal employee

== General election ==
=== Post-primary endorsements ===
Dan Patrick (R)

State legislators

- Eddie Lucio Jr., state senator from the 27th district (1991–present) (Democratic)

Organizations

- Texas Alliance for Life
Mike Collier (D)

U.S. Representatives

- Steve Bartlett, U.S. Representative for Texas's 3rd congressional district (1983–1991) and Mayor of Dallas (1991–1995) (Republican)

State officials

- Bill Ratliff, 40th Lieutenant Governor of Texas (2000–2003) (Republican)

State legislators

- Byron Cook, state representative from the 8th district (2003–2019) (Republican)
- Lyle Larson, state representative from the 122nd district (2011–present) (Republican)
- Bennett Ratliff, state representative from the 115th district (2013–2015) (Republican)

Labor unions

- Texas Federation of Teachers
- United Auto Workers

Organizations

- Equality Texas

Newspapers and other media

- Fort Worth Star-Telegram

=== Polling ===
Graphical summary

Poll source	Date(s) administered	Sample size	Margin of error	Dan Patrick (R)	Mike Collier (D)	Shanna Steele (L)	Other	Undecided
CWS Research (R) (Note: Poll conducted for the Defend Texas Liberty PAC.)	November 2–5, 2022	786 (LV)	± 3.5%	46%	38%	6%	–	9%
UT Tyler	October 17–24, 2022	1,330 (RV)	± 2.9%	39%	32%	5%	4% (Note: "Someone else" with 4%)	18%
UT Tyler	October 17–24, 2022	973 (LV)	± 3.4%	44%	35%	5%	3% (Note: "Someone else" with 3%)	13%
Emerson College	October 17–19, 2022	1,000 (LV)	± 3.0%	47%	42%	3%	–	7%
Siena College	October 16–19, 2022	649 (LV)	± 5.1%	49%	41%	–	1% (Note: "Another candidate" with 1%; "Not going to vote" with <1%)	9%
ActiVote	June 23 – September 21, 2022	250 (LV)	± 6.0%	46%	38%	17%	–	–
Siena College	September 14–18, 2022	651 (LV)	± 4.4%	49%	40%	–	–	11%
Texas Hispanic Policy Foundation	September 6–15, 2022	1,172 (LV)	± 2.9%	48%	42%	2%	–	8%
UT Tyler	September 7–13, 2022	1,243 (RV)	± 2.9%	39%	28%	8%	5% (Note: "Someone else" with 5%)	20%
YouGov/UT	August 26 – September 6, 2022	1,200 (RV)	± 2.8%	39%	32%	4%	4% (Note: "Someone else" with 4%)	20%
YouGov/UH/TSU	August 11–29, 2022	1,312 (LV)	± 2.7%	49%	43%	–	–	8%
UT Tyler	August 1–7, 2022	1,384 (RV)	± 2.8%	36%	28%	8%	7%	21%
UT Tyler	August 1–7, 2022	1,199 (LV)	± 3.0%	39%	30%	6%	6%	18%
YouGov/UH	June 27 – July 7, 2022	1,169 (RV)	± 2.9%	45%	41%	–	–	14%
YouGov/UH	June 27 – July 7, 2022	1,006 (LV)	± 3.1%	48%	43%	–	–	9%
YouGov/UT	June 16–24, 2022	1,200 (RV)	± 2.8%	38%	26%	5%	6%	25%
YouGov/TXHPF	March 18–28, 2022	1,139 (LV)	± 2.6%	49%	43%	–	–	8%

Hypothetical polling

Dan Patrick vs. Michelle Beckley

Poll source	Date(s) administered	Sample size	Margin of error	Dan Patrick (R)	Michelle Beckley (D)	Undecided
YouGov/TXHPF	March 18–28, 2022	1,139 (LV)	± 2.6%	50%	42%	8%

=== Results ===
2022 Texas lieutenant gubernatorial election
Party	Candidate	Votes	%	±%
Republican	Dan Patrick (incumbent)	4,317,692	53.75%	+2.45
Democratic	Mike Collier	3,492,544	43.48%	–3.01
Libertarian	Shanna Steele	222,208	2.77%	+0.56
Total votes		8,032,444	100.00%	
Republican hold				

==== By congressional district ====
Patrick won 25 of 38 congressional districts.

District	Patrick	Collier	Representative
1st	76%	22%	Louie Gohmert (117th Congress)
1st	76%	22%	Nathaniel Moran (118th Congress)
2nd	61%	36%	Dan Crenshaw
3rd	58%	40%	Van Taylor (117th Congress)
3rd	58%	40%	Keith Self (118th Congress)
4th	64%	34%	Pat Fallon
5th	62%	36%	Lance Gooden
6th	63%	34%	Jake Ellzey
7th	34%	63%	Lizzie Fletcher
8th	66%	32%	Kevin Brady (117th Congress)
8th	66%	32%	Morgan Luttrell (118th Congress)
9th	23%	74%	Al Green
10th	60%	37%	Michael McCaul
11th	72%	25%	August Pfluger
12th	58%	39%	Kay Granger
13th	73%	24%	Ronny Jackson
14th	65%	32%	Randy Weber
15th	52%	45%	Vicente Gonzalez (117th Congress)
15th	52%	45%	Monica De La Cruz (118th Congress)
16th	35%	61%	Veronica Escobar
17th	64%	34%	Pete Sessions
18th	25%	72%	Sheila Jackson Lee
19th	75%	22%	Jodey Arrington
20th	33%	63%	Joaquín Castro
21st	60%	37%	Chip Roy
22nd	59%	39%	Troy Nehls
23rd	54%	43%	Tony Gonzales
24th	55%	42%	Beth Van Duyne
25th	66%	32%	Roger Williams
26th	60%	38%	Michael Burgess
27th	63%	34%	Michael Cloud
28th	46%	50%	Henry Cuellar
29th	30%	66%	Sylvia Garcia
30th	21%	76%	Eddie Bernice Johnson (117th Congress)
30th	21%	76%	Jasmine Crockett (118th Congress)
31st	60%	37%	John Carter
32nd	33%	64%	Colin Allred
33rd	25%	72%	Marc Veasey
34th	44%	53%	Mayra Flores (117th Congress)
34th	44%	53%	Vicente Gonzalez (118th Congress)
35th	25%	70%	Lloyd Doggett (117th Congress)
35th	25%	70%	Greg Casar (118th Congress)
36th	67%	31%	Brian Babin
37th	20%	77%	Lloyd Doggett
38th	59%	38%	Wesley Hunt

== See also ==
- 2022 Texas elections

== Notes ==
Partisan clients
