= Mexican American Legislative Caucus =

The Mexican American Legislative Caucus is a 501(c)(6) non-profit organization composed of members of the Texas House of Representatives committed to addressing issues of particular importance to Latinos across the state.

== History ==
The Mexican American Legislative Caucus (MALC) was founded in 1973 in the Texas House of Representatives by a small group of lawmakers of Mexican American heritage for the purpose of strengthening their numbers and better representing a united Latino constituency across the state. MALC is the oldest and largest Latino legislative caucus in the United States.

In the 1990s, recognizing the growth of the Hispanic population in Texas and anticipating a new ethnic majority, MALC opened membership eligibility to House members of any race or ethnicity who represent majority-Latino constituencies.

== Mission ==
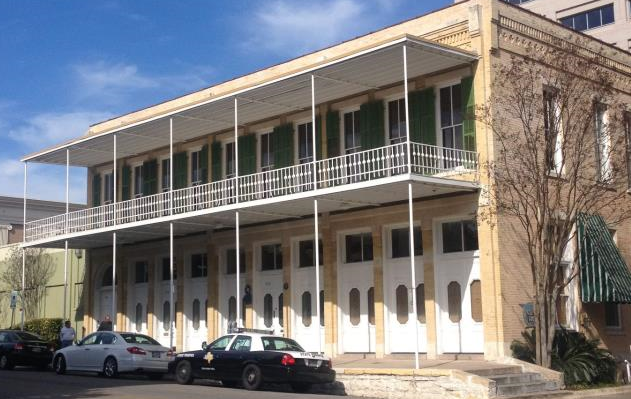
Mexican American Legislative Caucus Headquarters on the intersection of 13th and Colorado Streets in Austin, Texas.

Latinos today represent Texas’ fastest growing political and economic sector. To meet the needs of this rapidly growing population, MALC serves as an information clearinghouse to Caucus members and non-members alike. By researching the implications of policy on Texas' Hispanic communities and by voting together, the Mexican American Legislative Caucus ensures that the interests of all Texans are represented.

MALC's educational outreach initiatives, conducted between bi-annual sessions of the Texas Legislature, strive to raise the level of Latino engagement in Texas government and politics.

== Membership ==
As of 2013, MALC had a membership of 40 Democratic House members from all parts of the state, and is the second-largest caucus in Texas. Members are on all but 3 House Committees in the Texas House of Representatives. MALC members vote as a bloc on consequential matters for Latino constituents.

2013 Officers

Chairman Trey Martinez Fischer (D), San Antonio

Vice-chairman Eddie Rodriguez (D), Austin

Secretary Armando "Mando" Martinez (D), Weslaco

Treasurer Mary Gonzalez (D), El Paso

Legal Counsel Ana Hernandez Luna (D), Houston

Roberto Alonzo (D), Dallas

Carol Alvarado (D), Houston

Rafael M. Anchía (D), Dallas

Lon Burnam (D0, Fort Worth

Terry Canales (D), Edinburg

Garnet Coleman (D), Houston

Philip Cortez (D), San Antonio

Dawnna Dukes (D), Austin

Joe Farias, San Antonio

Jessica Farrar (D), Houston

Larry Gonzales (R), Round Rock

John Garza (R), San Antonio

Naomi Gonzalez (D), El Paso

Bobby Guerra (D), Hidalgo

Ryan Guillen (R; former D), Rio Grande City

Roland Gutierrez (D), San Antonio

Abel Herrero (D), Robstown

Tracy O. King (D), Eagle Pass

Oscar Longoria (D), Weslaco

José Manuel Lozano (R; former D), Kingsville

Eddie Lucio, III (D), San Benito

Marisa Marquez (D), El Paso

Ruth McClendon, San Antonio

José Menéndez (D), San Antonio

Joseph "Joe" Moody (D), El Paso

Sergio Muñoz (D), Mission

Elliott Naishtat (D), Austin

Alfonso "Poncho" Nevárez, Eagle Pass

René Oliveira (D), Brownsville

Mary Ann Perez (D), Houston

Joseph Picket (D), El Paso

Richard Raymond Pena (D), Laredo

Justin Rodriguez (D), San Antonio

Jason Villalba (R), Dallas

Michael Villarreal (D), San Antonio

Armando Walle (D), Houston

== See also ==
- National Association of Latino Elected Officials
