= Tim Von Dohlen =

American politician

Timothy Donald Von Dohlen is an American former politician.

Von Dohlen was first elected to the Texas House of Representatives in 1970, and held the 42nd district seat for a single two-year term. He then represented the 39th district for five consecutive terms, until 1983. Von Dohlen returned to state house from 1991 to 1993, as the legislator from the 31st district. Throughout his tenure as a state legislator, Von Dohlen was affiliated with the Democratic Party and lived in Goliad.
