= Hector Uribe =

American politician

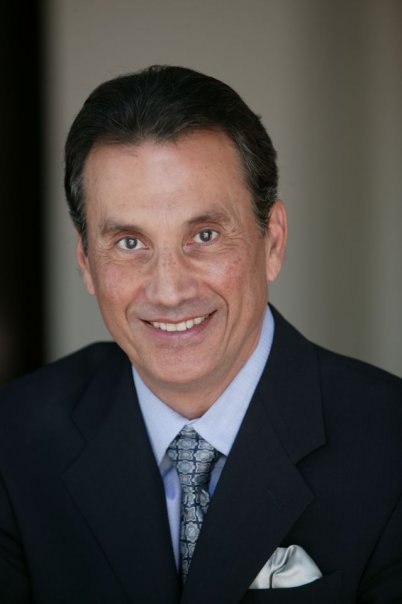

Member of the Texas Senate from the 27th district
- In office March 1, 1981 – January 8, 1991
- Preceded by: Raul L. Longoria
- Succeeded by: Eddie Lucio Jr.

Member of the Texas House of Representatives from the 50th district
- In office April 7, 1978 – March 1, 1981
- Preceded by: Ruben M. Torres
- Succeeded by: René Oliveira

Personal details
- Born: Hector Rolando Uribe; January 17, 1946 (age 80) Brownsville, Texas
- Party: Democratic
- Education: University of Miami (BA, JD)
- Profession: Lawyer

Hector Rolando Uribe (born January 17, 1946) is an American lawyer. He is a former Democratic member of the Texas Senate and the Texas House of Representatives. He was the Democratic party nominee for Texas land commissioner in 2010, but was defeated in the election by Jerry E. Patterson. He is also an actor, listed as Roland Uribe, having been in more than ten movies including the award-winning film No Country for Old Men.

== Education ==
He graduated from Christopher Columbus Marist High School in Miami, Florida, and later attended the University of Madrid in the summer of 1966.

He graduated from the University of Miami with a Bachelor of Arts in 1967 and later a Juris Doctor in 1970.

== Political career ==
He served in the Texas House of Representatives from 1978 to 1981 and in the Texas Senate from 1981 to 1991.

As a senator, he worked to pass the Texas Enterprise Zone Act, which is designed to create new jobs in economically impacted areas, and the Protective Services for the Elderly Act, which guards against abuse of senior citizens. He also worked to establish the University of Texas–Pan American.

Uribe was a narrow winner in the March 2, 2010, Democratic primary election for land commissioner, but lost the general election to Jerry E. Patterson by 35 percent of the ballots cast.

== Acting ==
Hector has starred in many films and theatre productions usually showcasing his Mexican heritage and Spanish. Of these films, his most prominent was a minor character in No Country for Old Men.

In 2018, he starred in the independent film Tejano alongside Patrick Mackie which was directed by David Blue Garcia. His role as a dying grandfather earned him a Best Supporting Actor Award from the Queen Palm Int’l Film Festival.

In 2025, he appeared in the independent film "Cerebral" produced by TexMex FilmWorks, written and directed by Alex Avila. He played the role of Dr. Marcus in a psychological thriller where a man who suffers a traumatic head injury gets better physically but becomes worse emotionally.

== Fort Trevino-Uribe ==
Hector is related to Blas Maria Uribe who is credited as expanding Fort Trevino-Uribe in San Ygnacio, TX. It is a historic home as well as being one of the oldest buildings from the Spanish-Mexican settlement north of the Rio Grande. The Uribe family has been in the San Ygnacio, TX area for centuries. His family also built the Uribe Chico House as well as other buildings in the town.

In the second half of President Trump’s presidency, a proposed wall would have cut these structures off from the main town and put them outside its borders. Hector was a vocal opponent to such an action as a democrat and as a member of the Uribe family.

Party political offices
Preceded by VaLinda Hathcox	Democratic nominee for Land Commissioner of Texas; 2010	Succeeded by John Cook
