= René Oliveira =

Texas politician (1955–2024)

René O. Oliveira

Member of the Texas House of Representatives
- In office January 8, 1991 – January 8, 2019
- Preceded by: Eddie Lucio Jr.
- Succeeded by: Alex Dominguez
- Constituency: 39th district (1991–1993); 37th district (1993–2019)
- In office April 28, 1981 – January 13, 1987
- Preceded by: Hector Uribe
- Succeeded by: Eddie Lucio Jr.
- Constituency: 50th district (1981–1983); 39th district (1983–1987)

Personal details
- Born: René Orlando Oliveira; March 14, 1955 Brownsville, Texas, U.S.
- Died: January 23, 2024 (aged 68) Brownsville, Texas, U.S.
- Party: Democratic
- Children: 2
- Education: University of Texas; University of Texas School of Law
- Occupation: Attorney

René Orlando Oliveira (March 14, 1955 – January 23, 2024) was an American attorney and politician. He was a Democratic member of the Texas House of Representatives. He was first elected to represent the 37th district in 1981. After losing a 1986 bid for the Texas State Senate, he was out of office from 1987 until he regained his seat in the Texas House in the 1990 election.

Oliveira was arrested and charged for driving under the influence in April 2018. He was defeated for re-election in the May 2018 primary runoff election by Alex Dominguez.

Oliveira died on January 23, 2024, at the age of 68.

== Texas House of Representatives ==
Oliveira served on the Business & Industry Committee, which he chaired; the State Affairs Committee; and the Redistricting Committee. He was a one time chairman of the House Ways and Means Committee.

Texas House of Representatives
| Preceded by Hector Uribe | Member of the Texas House of Representatives from District 50 (Brownsville); 1981–1983 | Succeeded by Wilhelmina Delco |

| Preceded by Tim Von Dohlen | Member of the Texas House of Representatives from District 39 (Brownsville); 1983–1987 | Succeeded by Eddie Lucio Jr. |

| Preceded by Eddie Lucio Jr. | Member of the Texas House of Representatives from District 39 (Brownsville); 1991–1993 | Succeeded by Renato Cuellar |

| Preceded by Irma Lerma Rangel | Member of the Texas House of Representatives from District 37 (Brownsville); 1993–2019 | Succeeded by Alex Dominguez |
