= Erin Gamez =

Texas politician (born 1989)

Erin Gámez

Member of the Texas House of Representatives from the 38th district
- Incumbent
- Assumed office March 30, 2022
- Preceded by: Eddie Lucio III

Personal details
- Born: June 7, 1989 (age 37) Brownsville, Texas
- Party: Democratic
- Education: University of Texas at Austin (BA); South Texas College of Law (JD)
- Occupation: Attorney
- Website: https://eringamez.com/

Erin Elizabeth Gámez (born June 7, 1989) is a Democratic member of the Texas House of Representatives for House District 38, which is located in Cameron County and encompasses the majority of Brownsville.

== Biography ==
Erin Gámez was born and raised in Brownsville, Texas. She graduated from the University of Texas at Austin in 2010 and received her JD from South Texas College of Law in 2014. She is an associate attorney at the Law Offices of Ernesto Gámez Jr. and has served as a defense attorney for the Cameron County Mental Health Diversion Court.

== Texas House of Representatives ==
Gámez was elected in a special election in March 2022 held to fill the seat vacated by Eddie Lucio III, making history as the first female representative to represent District 38. At 32, she was the youngest serving member in the 87th Legislature.

In 2023, Gámez was one of the twelve members to serve as House impeachment managers in the impeachment trial of Texas Attorney General Ken Paxton in the Texas State Senate.

In 2024, Gámez was elected as Vice Chair of the Mexican American Legislative Caucus (MALC).

During the 89th Legislative First Called Special Session in August 2025, Gámez was one of the members of the Texas House Democratic Caucus that broke quorum, delaying the mid-decade Congressional redistricting plan proposed by Texas Republicans at the request of President Donald Trump.

== Legislative Committees ==
Gámez is currently serving as a member of the following committees:

- General Investigating, Vice Chair
- Natural Resources, Member
- Transportation, Member
- The July 2025 Flooding Events, General Investigating, Member

== Election History ==
=== 2020 ===
Texas Primary Election 2020: House District 38
| Party | Candidate | Votes | % | ±% |
|---|---|---|---|---|
| Democratic | Eddie Lucio III | 7,907 | 53.9 | 0.00 |
| Democratic | Erin Gámez | 6,763 | 46.1 | 0.0 |

=== 2022 ===
Texas Primary Election 2022: House District 38
| Party | Candidate | Votes | % | ±% |
|---|---|---|---|---|
| Democratic | Erin Gámez | 5,439 | 58.2 | +12.1 |
| Democratic | Jonathan Gracia | 3,905 | 41.8 | 0.0 |

=== 2024 ===
Texas General Election 2024: House District 38
| Party | Candidate | Votes | % | ±% |
|---|---|---|---|---|
| Democratic | Erin Gámez | 33,944 | 100.00 | 0.00 |
