= Alex Dominguez (politician) =

Texas politician (born 1970)

Member of the Texas House of Representatives from the 37th district
- In office January 8, 2019 – January 10, 2023
- Preceded by: René Oliveira
- Succeeded by: Janie Lopez

Personal details
- Born: Alejandro Gonzalez Dominguez; December 6, 1970 (age 55)
- Party: Democratic
- Education: Rice University (BA); Arizona State University (JD)

Alejandro Gonzalez Dominguez (born December 6, 1970) is an American former politician. He is a former member of the Texas House of Representatives from District 37. He represented the district from January 8, 2019, to January 10, 2023.

== Early life and education ==
Dominguez was born as the sixth child of ten children born to a migrant farmworker family. He received a Bachelor of Arts in political science from Rice University in 1993 and a Juris Doctor from the Sandra Day O'Connor College of Law at Arizona State University.

== Texas House of Representatives ==
On May 22, 2018, Dominguez unseated incumbent René Oliveira in a runoff election for Texas's 37th House of Representatives district. He ran unopposed in the November general election.

Dominguez announced his campaign for the Texas Senate (District 27) on November 17, 2021, intending to replace Eddie Lucio Jr. who was set to retire and not run for re-election.

During his tenure, he received thousands of dollars in campaign contributions from lobbyists at SpaceX. While in office, Dominguez voted on measures that spurred development beneficial to the company. He also owned land near SpaceX's Starbase, selling it after he left the legislature for US$330,000, more than 180 times the value of the land when he bought it in 2007. When Dominguez was a county commissioner, he also supported subsidies supporting SpaceX's early expansions. Dominguez told Reuters that an attorney for the commissioners agreed that there was no conflict of interest in him owning the land and his role. He also told Reuters that the campaign contributions and the sale of the land did not affect his decisions in office.

Texas House of Representatives
Preceded by René Oliveira	Member of the Texas House of Representatives from District 37 (Brownsville); 2019–2023	Succeeded by Janie Lopez
