= Joe Moody (politician) =

American politician

Speaker pro tempore of the Texas House of Representatives
- Incumbent
- Assumed office February 13, 2025
- Preceded by: Charlie Geren
- In office January 8, 2019 – July 15, 2021
- Preceded by: Dennis Bonnen
- Succeeded by: Charlie Geren

Member of the Texas House of Representatives from the 78th district
- Incumbent
- Assumed office January 8, 2013
- Preceded by: Dee Margo
- In office January 13, 2009 – January 11, 2011
- Preceded by: Pat Haggerty
- Succeeded by: Dee Margo

Personal details
- Born: Joseph Edward Moody; January 9, 1981 (age 45) El Paso, Texas, U.S.
- Party: Democratic
- Spouse: Adrianne Moody
- Education: New Mexico State University (BA); Texas Tech University (JD)
- Website: Office website

Joseph Edward Moody (born January 9, 1981) is a lawyer from El Paso, Texas, who serves as Speaker Pro Tempore of the Texas House of Representatives. He represented District 78 since 2008 with the exception of the 82nd Texas Legislature where he was defeated by Dee Margo in the 2010 general election. He is a member of the Democratic Party.

== Early life and education ==
Moody was raised in El Paso, Texas and attended Cathedral High School. His father, William Moody, served as a state district judge, and his mother, Magdalena Morales-Moody, was a school teacher. He attended New Mexico State University where he studied government and history. He went on to graduate from Texas Tech University School of Law.

== Elections ==
After graduating from law school in 2006, Moody helped his father Bill Moody campaign for the Supreme Court of Texas. He was an assistant district attorney in El Paso County when he ran against Louis Irwin in the Democratic primary leading up to the 2008 Texas House of Representatives election. After winning the primary, he faced Republican Dee Margo in the general elections.

Moody defeated Margo in the 2008 general election, winning by 3,200 votes. Both ran against each other again in the 2010 Texas House of Representatives election where Margo won. They faced each other a third time during the 2012 Texas House of Representatives election where Moody won.

Moody won his fifth nonconsecutive term in the House in the general election held on November 6, 2018. With 31,361 votes (65.2 percent) and buoyed by the U.S. Senate candidacy of Beto O'Rourke, also an El Paso native, Moody beat Republican candidate Jeffrey Lane who finished with 16,741 votes (34.8 percent).

== Texas House of Representatives ==
Moody served as Speaker Pro Tempore in the 86th and 87th Legislatures, but was removed from the position by Texas House Speaker Dade Phelan on July 15, 2021, after Moody and other Democrats broke quorum by leaving the state on July 12, 2021 in protest of Republican sponsored voting legislation. He was reappointed to the role in the 89th Legislature by Speaker Dustin Burrows.

Moody has made criminal justice a primary focus of his time in the legislature and has frequently served on the House Committee on Criminal Jurisprudence; Moody was the chair of the committee in 2017 and 2023.

In the Robert Roberson case, Moody featured prominently in the effort to halt the execution, believing the case was eligible for appeal under Texas' junk science law. In 2024, 84 members of the Texas House signed a petition to the Board of Pardons and Paroles to urge clemency in the case. When the Board denied this request, the Texas House Committee on Criminal Jurisprudence, with Moody as the Chair, issued a subpoena for Roberson to testify before the committee in an attempt to force a delay of the execution. The execution was delayed, but the Texas Supreme Court ruled that the committee had overstepped its bounds. The committee issued more subpoenas before a new execution date was scheduled. Roberson never testified before the committee, but in 2025 the court issued a stay of execution and ordered the case to be retried in light of the junk science law.

Following the mass shooting at Robb Elementary School in Uvalde, Texas, Moody was selected to be Vice Chair of the committee investigating the causes and response by law enforcement.

Texas House of Representatives
Preceded by Dennis Bonnen	Speaker pro tempore of the Texas House of Representatives; 2019–2021	Succeeded by Charlie Geren
Preceded by Charlie Geren	Speaker pro tempore of the Texas House of Representatives; 2025–present	Incumbent
