= Toni Rose (politician) =

Democratic Texas legislator

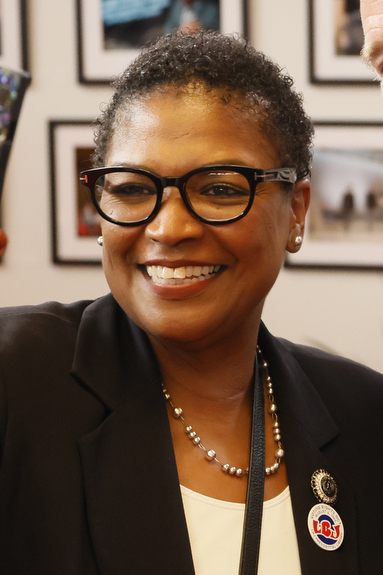

Member of the Texas House of Representatives from the 110th district
- Incumbent
- Assumed office January 8, 2013
- Preceded by: Barbara Mallory Caraway

Personal details
- Born: February 3, 1968 (age 58)
- Party: Democratic
- Education: Paul Quinn College
- Occupation: Mental health professional
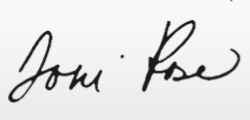
- Signature
- Website: Campaign website

Toni Rose (born February 3, 1968) is an American politician who has served in the Texas House of Representatives since 2013, representing the 110th district. She is a member of the Democratic Party.
