= Janie Lopez =

American politician

Member of the Texas House of Representatives from the 37th district
- Incumbent
- Assumed office January 10, 2023
- Preceded by: Alex Dominguez
- Succeeded by: Oziel Ochoa (elect)

Personal details
- Born: Cameron, Texas
- Party: Republican

Janie Lopez is an American politician who is a member of the Texas House of Representatives, representing the 37th district. Her district comprises Willacy County and parts of Cameron County. Prior to her election to the house in 2022, Lopez served as a trustee of the San Benito school board. Lopez is the first Latina Republican to represent the Rio Grande Valley in the House.

== Tenure ==
Lopez serves on the Environmental Regulation Committee and the Juvenile Justice & Family Issue Committee.

== Elections ==
In 2022, Lopez defeated Democrat Luis Villareal Jr. in a competitive race flipping the seat.

== Political positions ==
=== Term limits ===
Lopez supports term limits for members of Congress and signed the Term Limits Convention pledge.

== Personal life ==
Lopez's parents legally immigrated to the United States from Mexico. Lopez is the middle child of seven and is the first in her family to attend and graduate from college with honorary awards. She has stated she is guided by her Christian values.
