= Marisa Marquez =

American politician

Member of the Texas House of Representatives from the 77th district
- In office January 13, 2009 – January 9, 2017
- Preceded by: Paul Moreno
- Succeeded by: Evelina Ortega

Personal details
- Born: September 27, 1978 (age 48) Houston, Texas, US
- Party: Democratic
- Education: University of Notre Dame (BA)
- Website: www.marisamarquez.com

Marisa Marquez is a former Democratic member of the Texas House of Representatives, having served from 2009 until 2017. She did not seek re-election in 2016. In 2008, Marquez unseated Paul Moreno, the longest-serving Latino elected official in the United States. Moreno was considered the Conscience of the House for his tenure, over 40 years, and his outspoken personality. Marquez became the first woman ever to represent District 77 in the Texas House of Representatives and the second Latina ever elected from El Paso, Texas. She was also the first female Latino to serve on the Education Subcommittee of Appropriations and the first El Pasoan since 1958. During her appointment to the House Appropriations Committee, 83rd and 84th Legislative Session, she was the only Hispanic female on the Appropriations or Senate Finance Committee(s). Her accomplishments include creating the only county ethics commission in the state, statewide colonia reform and appropriating funding for the inaugural University of Texas at El Paso pharmacy school. Attacked for being a Republican by primary opponents, Marquez proved to be an effective and bipartisan legislator. She retired in 2017 and became a partner at FORMA Group LLC, a public affairs firm based out of El Paso.

Marquez was born in Houston, Texas. Her parents are from El Paso. Marquez and her parents moved back to El Paso. She received her bachelor's degree from University of Notre Dame. She served in AmeriCorps VISTA and worked in health care in El Paso prior to serving in the Legislature.
