= Greg Bonnen =

American politician

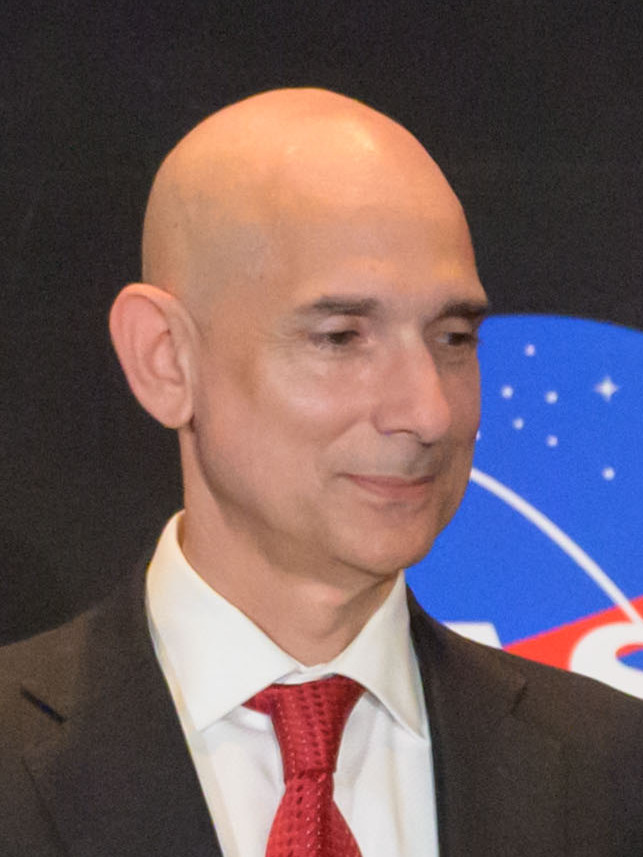
- Bonnen in 2024

Member of the Texas House of Representatives from the 24th district
- Incumbent
- Assumed office January 8, 2013
- Preceded by: Larry Taylor

Personal details
- Born: James Gregory Bonnen; June 18, 1966 (age 60) Angleton, Texas, U.S.
- Party: Republican
- Spouse: Kim Bonnen
- Children: 2
- Relatives: Dennis Bonnen (brother)
- Education: Texas A&M University; Texas A&M University at Galveston
- Occupation: Neurosurgeon

James Gregory Bonnen (born June 18, 1966) is an American politician. A member of the Republican Party, he has served in the Texas House of Representatives since 2013.

== Life and career ==
Bonnen was born in Angleton, Texas, the son of David Carroll Bonnen, a municipal judge, and Stamatia Psoras. He was the brother of Dennis Bonnen, a Texas representative. He attended Texas A&M University, earning his Bachelor of Science in biochemistry. He also attended Texas A&M University at Galveston, graduating in 1992. After graduating. he worked as a neurosurgeon.

Bonnen has served in the Texas House of Representatives since 2013.

Texas House of Representatives
Preceded by Larry Taylor	Member of the Texas House of Representatives from the 24th district 2013–present	Incumbent
