= Texas's 119th House of Representatives district =

American legislative district

Texas's 119th State House of Representatives district
Representative
Elizabeth Campos; D–San Antonio
- Demographics: 17.4% White; 11.7% Black; 69.3% Hispanic; 2.4% Asian
- Population (2020) • Voting age: 201,534; 149,782

The 119th district of the Texas House of Representatives contains parts of southern and eastern San Antonio. The district also includes parts of China Grove, Converse, Schertz, Universal City, and Live Oak. The current representative is Elizabeth Campos, who was first elected in 2020.
