= Texas's 134th House of Representatives district =

American legislative district

Texas's 134th State House of Representatives district
Representative
Ann Johnson; D–Houston
- Demographics: 58.8% White; 7.6% Black; 15.3% Hispanic; 17.0% Asian
- Population (2020) • Voting age: 197,013; 163,800

The 134th district of the Texas House of Representatives contains parts of Harris County. The current representative is Ann Johnson, who was first elected in 2020.
