= Texas's 114th House of Representatives district =

American legislative district

Texas's 114th State House of Representatives district
Representative
John Bryant; D–Dallas
- Demographics: 45.6% White; 14.2% Black; 32.2% Hispanic; 6.8% Asian
- Population (2020) • Voting age: 184,649; 151,157

The 114th district of the Texas House of Representatives contains parts of Dallas. The current representative is John Bryant, who has represented the district since 2023.

== List of representatives ==
- John Turner from 2019 to 2023.
