= Texas's 69th House of Representatives district =

American legislative district

Texas's 69th State House of Representatives district
Representative
James Frank; R–Wichita Falls
- Demographics: 64.7% White; 10.4% Black; 19.7% Hispanic; 2.7% Asian
- Population (2020) • Voting age: 185,518; 144,494

The 69th district of the Texas House of Representatives contains the entirety of the following Counties: Archer, Baylor, Clay, Cottle, Fisher, Foard, Hardeman, Haskell, King, Knox, Motley, Stonewall, Wichita, and Wilbarger. The current representative is James Frank, who was first elected in 2012.
