= Ann Johnson (politician) =

American attorney & politician (born 1974)

Member of the Texas House of Representatives from the 134th district
- Incumbent
- Assumed office January 12, 2021
- Preceded by: Sarah Davis

Personal details
- Born: August 13, 1974 (age 52) Houston, Texas, U.S.
- Party: Democratic
- Spouse: Sonya Cuellar
- Education: University of Texas at Austin (BA); South Texas College of Law Houston (JD)
- Occupation: Attorney
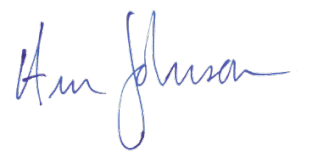
- Signature
- Website: Campaign website

Annette Elizabeth Johnson (born August 13, 1974) is an American attorney and politician. She has represented the 134th District in the Texas House of Representatives since 2021. She is a member of the Democratic Party. Johnson is also an adjunct professor of law at South Texas College of Law Houston.

== Career ==
Early in her legal career, Johnson worked as an attorney for politicians Mike Martin, Craig Eiland, and Jack Brooks. Johnson also worked in the Office of Legislative Affairs during the Clinton administration and in the Harris County District Attorney's Office.

Johnson successfully argued the case of a minor charged with prostitution in the 2010 case In re B.W, in which the Texas Supreme Court found that Johnson's client had not committed a crime because she could not legally consent to sex.

In 2020, she was elected to represent District 134 in the Texas House of Representatives, succeeding Republican incumbent Sarah Davis. Johnson supports investments in public education, abortion rights, Medicaid expansion, and gun regulation.

During the 2022–2023 session, Johnson was vice-chair of the House Committee on General Investigating, which directed two high-profile investigations that session, first against state representative Bryan Slaton, who resigned and was later expelled from the House on May 9, 2023 for providing alcohol to and having sexual relations with a 19-year old legislative aide, and then against Texas Attorney General Kenneth Paxton, who was impeached by the House on May 27, 2023, on twenty articles involving securities fraud, abuse of office, and retaliation against whistleblowers. Johnson was named one of twelve House members who served as managers during Paxton's impeachment trial in the Texas Senate.

== Personal life ==
Johnson is the daughter of former State Representative Jake Johnson and former Judge Carolyn Marks Johnson. Johnson married artist Sonya Cuellar in 2015 after the legalization of same-sex marriage. They have three rescue dogs.

== Electoral history ==
Texas general election, 2020: House District 134
Party	Candidate	Votes	%	±%
Democratic	Ann Johnson	56,895	52.3%	5.47%
Republican	Sarah Davis (incumbent)	51,960	47.7%	−5.47%
Majority		4,935	4.6%	−1.74%
Turnout		108,855	100%	+22.4%
Democratic gain from Republican		Swing	+10.94%	

Texas general election, 2022: House District 134
Party	Candidate	Votes	%	±%
Democratic	Ann Johnson (incumbent)	49,688	61.6%	9.3%
Republican	Ryan McConnico	29,968	37.1%	−10.6%
Libertarian	Carl Unsicker	1,058	1.3%	1.3%
Majority		19,720	24.4%	19.8%
Turnout		80,714	100%	−25.9%
Democratic hold				

Texas general election, 2024: House District 134
Party	Candidate	Votes	%	±%
Democratic	Ann Johnson (incumbent)	61,037	61.3%	−0.3%
Republican	Audrey Douglas	38,480	38.7%	1.6%
Majority		22,557	22.6%	−2.2%
Turnout		99,517	100%	18.9%
Democratic hold				

Texas House of Representatives
Preceded by Sarah Davis	Member of the Texas House of Representatives from the 134th district 2021–present	Incumbent
