= Texas's 110th House of Representatives district =

American legislative district

Texas's 110th State House of Representatives district
Representative
Toni Rose; D–DeSoto
- Demographics: 6.7% White; 34.1% Black; 58.7% Hispanic; 0.7% Asian
- Population (2020) • Voting age: 184,614; 127,657

The 110th district of the Texas House of Representatives consists of southern portions of the city of Dallas. The current representative is Toni Rose, who has represented the district since 2013.

A portion of both Interstate 45 and the Trinity River go through the district.
