= Texas's 38th House of Representatives district =

American legislative district

Texas's 38th State House of Representatives district
Representative
Erin Gamez; D–Brownsville

District 38 is a district in the Texas House of Representatives. It has been represented by Democrat Erin Gamez since 2022.

== Geography ==
The district is located in Cameron County, Texas.

== Members ==
- Jim Solis (until 2007)
- Eddie Lucio III (2007–2022)
- Erin Gamez (since 2022)
