= Texas's 90th House of Representatives district =

American legislative district

Texas's 90th State House of Representatives district
Representative
Ramon Romero Jr. D–Fort Worth
- Demographics: 17.0% White; 14.4% Black; 65.6% Hispanic; 2.8% Asian
- Population (2020) • Voting age: 202,379; 145,431

The 90th district of the Texas House of Representatives contains a portion of Tarrant county. The current representative is Ramon Romero Jr., who was first elected in 2014.
