= Texas's 46th House of Representatives district =

American legislative district

Texas's 46th State House of Representatives district
Representative
Sheryl Cole; D–Austin
- Demographics: 35.1% White; 19.7% Black; 37.3% Hispanic; 7.6% Asian
- Population (2020) • Voting age: 203,324; 151,543

The Texas House of Representatives 46th district represents an eastern portion Travis County. The current representative is Sheryl Cole, who has represented the district since 2019.

Following the 2021 redistricting, the district includes much of east Austin, most Pflugerville, and all of Manor.
