= Armando Martinez (politician) =

American politician

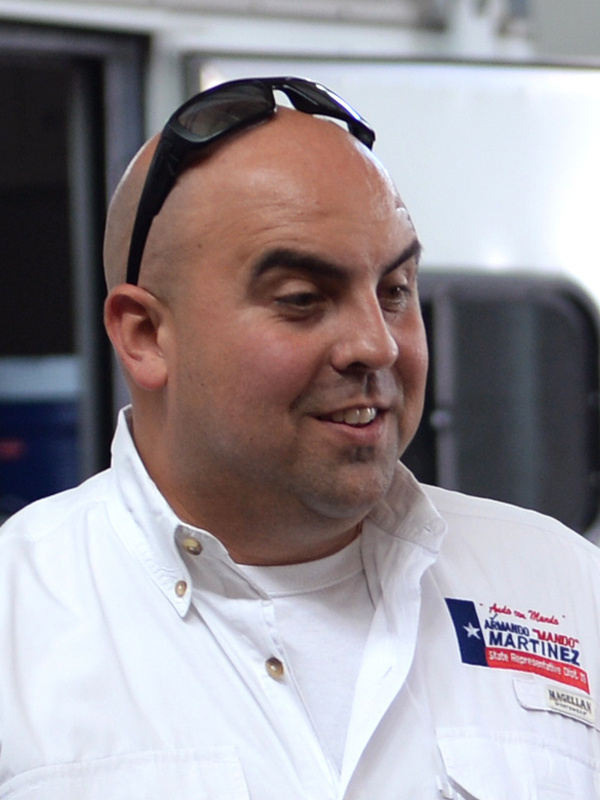
- Martinez in 2014

Member of the Texas House of Representatives from the 39th district
- Incumbent
- Assumed office January 11, 2005
- Preceded by: Miguel Wise

Personal details
- Born: January 6, 1976 (age 50) Weslaco, Texas, U.S.
- Party: Democratic
- Spouse: Marisa
- Education: University of Texas–Pan American(BS); University of Texas Rio Grande Valley(MPA); St. Mary's University School of Law(JD)
- Occupation: Firefighter, Paramedic, Contractor
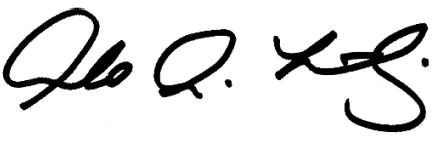
- Signature
- Website: Office website Campaign website

Armando "Mando" Martinez (born January 6, 1976) is a Democratic member of the Texas House of Representatives, serving since 2005. Martinez was born in Weslaco in Hidalgo County. He was elected to the Texas House of Representatives in 2004 to represent District 39, which encompasses Weslaco, Mercedes, Donna, San Juan, Alamo, Progreso, and Progreso Lakes.

== Biography ==
Armando "Mando" Martinez earned a Bachelor of Science degree from the University of Texas-Pan American in Edinburg, Texas. He earned a Master of Public Administration (MPA) from the University of Texas - Rio Grande Valley in 2020. He earned his Juris Doctor from St. Mary's University School of Law in 2025. Martinez is a licensed paramedic and firefighter with the City of Weslaco Fire Department EMS and has worked as a critical care flight paramedic for Valley Aircare. He is also a small business owner and contractor.

On January 1, 2017, Martinez was seriously wounded in the head by a stray bullet during a New Year's celebration, a case of celebratory gunfire.

== Texas House of Representatives ==
Representative Martinez was appointed by Texas Speaker of the House Dustin Burrows as Vice Chair of the Committee on Natural Resources during the 89th Legislative Session. He was appointed as Vice Chair of the Select Committee on Disaster Preparedness & Flooding created in response to the July 2025 Central Texas flooding disaster during the First Called Special Session of the 89th Legislative Session.

Martinez serves as Secretary for the Mexican American Legislative Caucus.

== Legislative Committees ==
Martinez is currently serving as a member of the following committees:

- Natural Resources, Vice Chair
- Select Committee on Disaster Preparedness & Flooding, Vice Chair
- Subcommittee on Appropriations Article III, Vice Chair
- Appropriations, Member
- Administration, Member

== Election History ==
=== 2004 ===
Texas General Election 2004: House District 39
Party	Candidate	Votes	%	±%
Democratic	Armando Martinez	16,297	100	0.00

=== 2006 ===
Texas General Election 2006: House District 39
Party	Candidate	Votes	%	±%
Democratic	Armando Martinez	8,122	100	0.00

=== 2008 ===
Texas General Election 2008: House District 39
Party	Candidate	Votes	%	±%
Democratic	Armando Martinez	23,879	100	0.00

=== 2010 ===
Texas Primary Election 2010: House District 39
Party	Candidate	Votes	%	±%
Democratic	Armando Martinez	3,705	32.89	0.00
Democratic	Joel De Los Santos	792	17.61	0.0

=== 2012 ===
Texas General Election 2012: House District 39
Party	Candidate	Votes	%	±%
Democratic	Armando Martinez	23,909	77.6	−22.4
Republican	Joel De Los Santos	6,886	22.4	0.0

=== 2014 ===
Texas General Election 2014: House District 39
Party	Candidate	Votes	%	±%
Democratic	Armando Martinez	14,409	100	+22.4

=== 2016 ===
Texas General Election 2016: House District 39
Party	Candidate	Votes	%	±%
Democratic	Armando Martinez	29,713	100	0.00

=== 2018 ===
Texas General Election 2018: House District 39
Party	Candidate	Votes	%	±%
Democratic	Armando Martinez	25,822	100	0.00

=== 2020 ===
Texas General Election 2020: House District 39
Party	Candidate	Votes	%	±%
Democratic	Armando Martinez	36,860	100	0.00

=== 2022 ===
Texas General Election 2022: House District 39
Party	Candidate	Votes	%	±%
Democratic	Armando Martinez	19,027	64.7	−35.3
Republican	Jimmie Garcia	10,385	35.3	0.0

=== 2024 ===
Texas General Election 2024: House District 39
Party	Candidate	Votes	%	±%
Democratic	Armando Martinez	26,962	60.9	−3.8
Republican	Jimmie Garcia	17,308	39.1	+3.8
