= Eddie Lucio Jr. =

Texas politician

Member of the Texas Senate from the 27th district
- In office January 8, 1991 – January 10, 2023
- Preceded by: Hector Uribe
- Succeeded by: Morgan LaMantia

Member of the Texas House of Representatives from the 39th district
- In office January 13, 1987 – January 8, 1991
- Preceded by: René Oliveira
- Succeeded by: René Oliveira

Personal details
- Born: January 20, 1946 (age 80) Brownsville, Texas, U.S.
- Party: Democratic
- Spouse: Minnie Lucio
- Children: Eddie Lucio III, Lynda Lucio
- Education: Pan American University
- Profession: President/CEO, Rio Shelters Inc.

Eduardo Andres Lucio Jr. (born January 20, 1946) is a Democratic politician who served in the Texas Senate, representing the 27th District from 1991 to 2023. Lucio also previously served in the Texas House of Representatives from 1987 to 1991.

== Career ==
Lucio is the Chairman of the Intergovernmental Relations Committee. He also sits on the Committees on Natural Resources & Economic Development, Veterans Affairs & Military Installations, the Subcommittee on Border Security, and serves as Vice Chairman of Senate Education Committee. He also created and sits on the Interagency Tasks Force on Children with Special Needs.

Eddie Lucio began his public service in 1971, becoming Cameron County Treasurer and later Cameron County commissioner.

He authored legislation creating the Regional Academic Health Center (RAHC) and he worked for passage of a bill during the 81st legislative session that creates the University of Texas Health Science Center - South Texas to serve Cameron, Hidalgo, Starr, Willacy, Brooks, Jim Hogg, Kenedy, Kleberg, and Zapata counties with a full-fledged medical school.

Lucio has worked to establish the partnership between the University of Texas at Brownsville and Texas Southmost College which allows UTB to become a four-year university and have access to the Permanent University Fund. Additionally, he authored the bill to create South Texas Community College.

Lucio was the only Democrat in the Texas Senate to support the 2013 legislation to restrict abortions to twenty weeks of gestation and to require abortions be performed in surgical centers. Lucio also authored legislation to require that women receiving abortions and physicians performing them take a free adoption awareness course. He described himself as "pro-life" and was endorsed and supported by Democrats for Life of America, a "pro-life" or anti-abortion movement PAC.

During the 78th legislative session, Lucio was elected by his colleagues as Senate President Pro Tempore.

On November 3, 2021, Lucio announced that he would not be running for reelection.

== Personal life ==
Lucio is the father of Eddie Lucio III, who served in the Texas House of Representatives. His dad is Eduardo Lucio. He was born and raised in Brownsville, Texas. He is a devout Catholic.

== Electoral history ==
=== 2020 ===
Texas general election, 2020: Senate District 27
| Party | Candidate | Votes | % | ±% |
|---|---|---|---|---|
| Democratic | Eddie Lucio Jr. (Incumbent) | 134,035 | 64.81 | −35.19 |
| Republican | Vanessa Tijerina | 72,768 | 35.19 | N/A |
| Total votes | | 206,803 | 100.00% | |
| Democratic hold | | | | |

=== 2016 ===
Texas general election, 2016: Senate District 27
| Party | Candidate | Votes | % | ±% |
|---|---|---|---|---|
| Democratic | Eddie Lucio Jr. (Incumbent) | 135,945 | 100.00 | 0.00 |
| Majority | | 135,945 | 100.00 | 0.00 |
| Turnout | | 135,945 | | |
| Democratic hold | | | | |

=== 2008 ===
Texas general election, 2008: Senate District 27
| Party | Candidate | Votes | % | ±% |
|---|---|---|---|---|
| Democratic | Eddie Lucio Jr. (Incumbent) | 111,596 | 100.00 | 0.00 |
| Majority | | 111,596 | 100.00 | 0.00 |
| Turnout | | 111,596 | | |
| Democratic hold | | | | |

=== 2004 ===
Texas general election, 2004: Senate District 27
| Party | Candidate | Votes | % | ±% |
|---|---|---|---|---|
| Democratic | Eddie Lucio Jr. (Incumbent) | 89,984 | 100.00 | 0.00 |
| Majority | | 89,984 | 100.00 | 0.00 |
| Turnout | | 89,984 | | +46.60 |
| Democratic hold | | | | |

=== 2002 ===
Texas general election, 2002: Senate District 27
| Party | Candidate | Votes | % | ±% |
|---|---|---|---|---|
| Democratic | Eddie Lucio Jr. (Incumbent) | 61,382 | 100.00 | 0.00 |
| Majority | | 61,382 | 100.00 | 0.00 |
| Turnout | | 61,382 | | −34.73 |
| Democratic hold | | | | |

=== 2000 ===
Texas general election, 2000: Senate District 27
| Party | Candidate | Votes | % | ±% |
|---|---|---|---|---|
| Democratic | Eddie Lucio Jr. (Incumbent) | 94,042 | 100.00 | 0.00 |
| Majority | | 94,042 | 100.00 | 0.00 |
| Turnout | | 94,042 | | +16.30 |
| Democratic hold | | | | |

=== 1996 ===
Texas general election, 1996: Senate District 27
| Party | Candidate | Votes | % | ±% |
|---|---|---|---|---|
| Democratic | Eddie Lucio Jr. (Incumbent) | 80,865 | 100.00 | +33.27 |
| Majority | | 80,865 | 100.00 | +66.55 |
| Turnout | | 80,865 | | +1.44 |
| Democratic hold | | | | |

=== 1994 ===
Texas general election, 1994: Senate District 27
| Party | Candidate | Votes | % | ±% |
|---|---|---|---|---|
| Democratic | Eddie Lucio Jr. (Incumbent) | 53,194 | 66.73 | −33.27 |
| Republican | Ismael Moran | 26,527 | 33.27 | +33.27 |
| Majority | | 26,667 | 33.45 | −66.55 |
| Turnout | | 79,721 | | −1.53 |
| Democratic hold | | | | |

Democratic primary, 1994: Senate District 27
| Candidate | | Votes | % | ± |
|---|---|---|---|---|
| ✓ | Eddie Lucio Jr. (Incumbent) | 33,467 | 70.56 | |
| | Miguel Wise | 13,964 | 29.44 | |
| Majority | | 19,503 | 41.12 | |
| Turnout | | 47,431 | | |

=== 1992 ===
Texas general election, 1992: Senate District 27
| Party | Candidate | Votes | % | ±% |
|---|---|---|---|---|
| Democratic | Eddie Lucio Jr. (Incumbent) | 80,961 | 100.00 | |
| Majority | | 80,961 | 100.00 | |
| Turnout | | 80,961 | | |
| Democratic hold | | | | |

Democratic primary, 1992: Senate District 27
| Candidate | | Votes | % | ± |
|---|---|---|---|---|
| | Juan “Chuy” Hinojosa | 25,132 | 42.67 | |
| ✓ | Eddie Lucio Jr. (Incumbent) | 33,765 | 57.33 | |
| Majority | | 8,633 | 14.66 | |
| Turnout | | 58,897 | | |

Texas House of Representatives
| Preceded by René Oliveira | Member of the Texas House of Representatives from District 39 (Brownsville); 1987–1991 | Succeeded by René Oliveira |
Texas Senate
| Preceded by Hector Uribe | Texas State Senator from District 27 (Brownsville); 1991-2023 | Succeeded by Morgan LaMantia |
| Preceded by Mike Moncrief | President pro tempore of the Texas Senate; 14 January 2003–2 June 2003 | Succeeded by Jane Nelson |
