= Armando Walle =

American politician (born 1978)

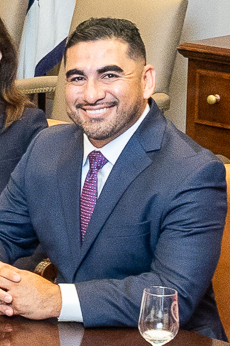

Member of the Texas House of Representatives from the 140th district
- Incumbent
- Assumed office January 13, 2009
- Preceded by: Kevin Bailey

Personal details
- Born: Armando Lucio Walle Jr. March 7, 1978 (age 48)
- Party: Democratic
- Education: University of Houston
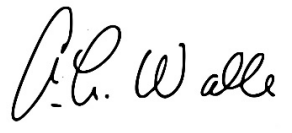
- Signature

Armando Lucio Walle Jr. (born March 7, 1978) is a member of the Texas House of Representatives, representing the 140th district in Houston, Texas. Walle is the Deputy Floor Leader of the Texas House Democrats. Walle was named Harris County COVID-19 Pandemic Recovery Czar by Harris County Judge Lina Hidalgo.

== Early life and education ==
Walle was born and raised in Houston; he was the oldest of five children. While in high school, Walle worked at a taquería and interned for Houston Councilwoman Carol Mimms Galloway. Walle also played football in middle school and high school, and credits his football coach as a major inspiration for his desire to be a role model. Walle graduated from MacArthur High School and earned a B.S. in political science from the University of Houston. As of 2013, Walle was pursuing a J.D. from the University of Houston.

== Texas House of Representatives ==
Walle worked for US Representatives Gene Green and Sheila Jackson Lee prior to being elected to the Texas House of Representatives. Walle left his job with Green to take on nine-term incumbent Democrat Kevin Bailey, ultimately upsetting the incumbent in the Democratic primary. With no Republican opponent in the general election, Walle took office in 2009. Walle serves as Deputy Floor Leader of his caucus, and serves on the Business & Industry Committee, serves as Vice Chair of the Land & Resource Management Committee, and serves on the Federalism & Fiscal Responsibility Committee.

In 2013, Walle supported the protests of Houston fast food workers seeking higher wages.

Walle (far right) at press conference in Boston during the 2025 Texas walkout, appearing alongside other Texas Democrats as well as William F. Galvin (Mass. Sec. of Commonwealth) and Maura Healey (Mass. Gov.)

Walle participated in the 2025 Texas walkout, leaving the state in hopes of denying quorum for Republican efforts to pass a modified congressional gerrymander mid-decade.

== Personal life ==
Armando is married to Debbie Dimas Walle, and has two sons.
