= Eddie Lucio III =

American politician

Member of the Texas House of Representatives from the 38th district
- In office January 9, 2007 – January 31, 2022
- Preceded by: Jim Solis
- Succeeded by: Erin Gamez

Personal details
- Born: December 19, 1978 (age 47) Brownsville, Texas, US
- Party: Democratic
- Relations: Eddie Lucio Jr. (father)
- Education: University of Texas at Austin
- Profession: Attorney, businessman

Eduardo Andres Lucio III (born December 19, 1978) is a former Democratic member of the Texas House of Representatives, having represented Texas's 38th district from 2007 until 2022.

== Early life and education ==
Lucio was born and raised in Brownsville, Texas. He attended James Pace High School in Brownsville. Upon graduation, he attended Texas Tech University on an athletic scholarship. He later received a BBA from the University of Texas at Austin. In 2005, he received his Doctorate of Jurisprudence from the University of Texas School of Law.

== Election history ==
Lucio was first elected to the Texas House of Representatives in 2006. He won re-election in 2008, 2010, 2012, 2014, 2016, 2018, and 2020. Lucio represented District 38, which is composed of the southwest region of Cameron County.

On January 18, 2022, Lucio announced he would resign in order to focus on his personal life. His resignation was effective on January 31, 2022.

=== 2006 ===
Texas general election, 2006: House District 38
Party	Candidate	Votes	%
Democratic	Eddie Lucio III	11,335	63.93
Republican	Luis Cavazos	5,054	28.50
Libertarian	Linda E. McNally	1,339	7.55
Turnout		17,728	
Democratic hold			

=== 2008 ===
In 2008, Lucio ran unopposed for the first time.

=== 2010 ===
In 2010, Lucio ran unopposed for a second time.

=== 2012 ===
Texas general election, 2012: House District 38
Party	Candidate	Votes	%
Democratic	Eddie Lucio III (incumbent)	22,408	70.76
Republican	Alex Torres	7,984	25.21
Libertarian	Nancy Mishou	1,274	4.02
Turnout		31,666	
Democratic hold			

=== 2014 ===
Democratic Party Primary Election, 2014: House District 38
Party	Candidate	Votes	%
Democratic	Eddie Lucio III (incumbent)	6,017	100.00

=== 2016 ===
In 2016, Lucio ran unopposed in both the Democratic primary and the general election.

=== 2018 ===
In 2016, Lucio ran unopposed in both the Democratic primary and the general election.

=== 2020 ===
Texas primary election, 2020: House District 38
Party	Candidate	Votes	%
Democratic	Eddie Lucio III (incumbent)	7,907	53.9
Democratic	Erin Gamez	6,763	46.1
Turnout		14,670	100.0

== Personal life ==
Lucio is currently an attorney in South Texas focusing on water law and policy. Lucio is a franchise owner for Orangetheory Fitness and Romeo's Pizza in South Texas.

His father, Eddie Lucio Jr., was a Democratic member of the Texas Senate.
