= Texas's 78th House of Representatives district =

American legislative district

Texas's 78th State House of Representatives district
Representative
| Joe Moody; D–El Paso |
- Demographics: 18.8% White; 5.7% Black; 72.8% Hispanic; 3.3% Asian
- Population (2020) • Voting age: 203,786; 153,882

The 78th district of the Texas House of Representatives consists of a portion of El Paso County. The current representative is Joe Moody, who has represented the district since 2013.
