= Texas's 143rd House of Representatives district =

American legislative district

Texas's 143rd State House of Representatives district
Representative
Ana Hernandez; D–Houston
- Demographics: 10.1% White; 13.2% Black; 75.8% Hispanic; 1.3% Asian
- Population (2020) • Voting age: 200,529; 143,834

The 143rd district of the Texas House of Representatives contains parts of Houston, Galena Park, and Jacinto City. The current representative is Ana Hernandez, who has represented the district since 2005.
