= Texas's 39th House of Representatives district =

American legislative district

Texas's 39th State House of Representatives district
Representative
Armando Martinez; D–Weslaco

District 39 is a district in the Texas House of Representatives. It has been represented by Democrat Armando Martinez since 2005.

== Geography ==
The district is located in Hidalgo County, Texas.

== Members ==
- Rene Oliveira (1983–1987)
- Eddie Lucio Jr. (1987 – January 8, 1991)
- Rene Oliveira (1991–1993)
- Miguel Wise (until 2005)
- Armando Martinez (since 2005)
