= Texas's 37th House of Representatives district =

American legislative district

Texas's 37th State House of Representatives district
Representative
Janie Lopez; R–San Benito
since 2023
- Demographics: 14.2% White; 83.1% Hispanic
- Population (2020) • Voting age: 184,892; 135,324

District 30 is a district in the Texas House of Representatives. It was created in the 3rd Legislature (1849–1851).

The district encompasses the entirety of Willacy County and just under 40% of Cameron County. It includes the cities of Raymondville, Harlingen, portions of Brownsville, Port Isabel, and Primera. It has been represented by Janie Lopez since 2023.
