= B. B. Paddock =

American politician, businessman, military officer and writer (1844–1922)

- Paddock's portrait for the 33rd Texas Legislature

Mayor of Fort Worth, Texas
- In office April 12, 1892 – April 10, 1900
- Preceded by: John Peter Smith
- Succeeded by: T. J. Powell

Member of the Texas House of Representatives
- In office January 11, 1881 – January 9, 1883
- Preceded by: William Randall Gause
- Succeeded by: George W. Wyatt
- Constituency: 53rd district
- In office January 14, 1913 – January 12, 1915
- Preceded by: Emil Gieptner
- Succeeded by: Hunter Pope Lane
- Constituency: 52nd district

Personal details
- Born: Boardman Buckley Paddock; January 22, 1844 Cleveland, Ohio, US
- Died: January 9, 1922 (aged 77) Fort Worth, Texas, US
- Party: Democratic
- Relations: Guy Richardson Pitner (son-in-law)
- Occupation: Politician, businessman, military officer, writer

Military service
- Allegiance: Confederate States of America
- Rank: Captain
- Unit: Wirt Adams' Cavalry Regiment
- Battles/wars: American Civil War; Battle of Iuka; Battle of Rowlett's Station; Battle of Shiloh; Siege of Vicksburg

Boardman Buckley Paddock (or Buckley Burton Paddock; January 22, 1844 – January 9, 1922) was an American politician, businessman, military officer, and writer. A Democrat, he was the Mayor of Fort Worth, Texas from 1892 to 1900, and a member of the Texas House of Representatives from 1881 to 1883, and again from 1913 to 1915.

Born in Cleveland, Paddock later lived in Mississippi. During the American Civil War, he was a captain in the Confederate States Army. He later moved to Fort Worth, Texas, where he worked as a newspaperman and a businessman. He helped lead the city's growth, with he and John Peter Smith being described as the city's two most prominent figures in its improvement.

== Early life ==
Paddock was born on January 22, 1844, in Cleveland, one of six children born to Boardman Paddock and Margaret (née Buckley) Paddock. His father was from Vermont and his mother from Ireland. From 1845 to c. 1859, he and his family lived in Wisconsin. He was an autodidact. He traveled westward throughout the United States and lived for a year among Native Americans. In 1861, he moved to Mississippi.

== Military service ==
At the onset of the American Civil War, Paddock enlisted as a private into Wirt Adams' Cavalry Regiment at Yazoo City, and on July 2, 1862, was promoted to captain, becoming the youngest person in the Confederate States Army to hold the rank.

Paddock was a member of the Confederate Secret Service and the Confederate Signal Corps. He was taken prisoner at least five or seven times, not once for more than 36 hours. He was once imprisoned by Confederate general Edmund Kirby Smith for looking too young to be a Confederate officer.

Paddock fought in the Battle of Champion Hill; the Siege of Corinth; the Battle of Iuka; the Battle of Rowlett's Station; the Battle of Shiloh; and the Siege of Vicksburg; among other battles. In a minor skirmish, in June 1864, he sunk an ironclad warship that had ran out of fuel and captured its crew of 268 men. In another skirmish, along the Sipsey River, he received a minor flesh wound to the thigh. Paddock believed that one of the company's skirmishes was the last battle of the war fought in the Eastern United States, as well as the last time the Confederate flag was flown in battle.

Paddock later commanded a scouting company and held the rank "chief of scouts". The company was originally composed of 48 men, which became 110 by the end of the war. He and his men developed a reputation for not dying in combat.

Paddock claimed that in every battle they fought during the war, not one man died. In an Alabama skirmish in late April 1865, several men were killed, though general Robert E. Lee had surrendered by then, thus officially concluding the war, the news of which having not reached them at the time. Throughout the war, Paddock had five of his horses killed, and in one battle, suffered 27 bullet punctures to his shirt. Novelist George Washington Cable, who served under him, used Paddock as inspiration for his 1901 novel The Cavalier.

== Career ==
Following the war, Paddock lived in Fayette, Mississippi for seven or eight years, where he read law and was admitted to the bar. In October 1872, he moved to Fort Worth, Texas. He practiced law for a short time, before purchasing The Fort Worth Democrat. The newspaper's publisher from 1873 to 1881, he advertised the city nationwide, leading to its growth. In 1873, he published the "Tarantula Map", a map which showed what he wanted Fort Worth to become.

On July 4, 1876, Paddock founded the Daily Democrat, which was also successful. In 1882, his newspapers were consolidated into The Fort Worth Gazette, which he was editor of until November 1885. In 1893, he became a teller for the First National Bank of Fort Worth. From 1886 to 1889, he was president of the Fort Worth and Rio Grande Railway. In 1891, he founded the Fort Worth and Utica Trust Company. From the 1890s to 1914, he unsuccessfully worked to have coal mines created in Young County.

Paddock was a Democrat. He was the Mayor of Fort Worth, from April 12, 1892, to April 10, 1900. He improved the city such that his "Tarantula Map" was reality. He and John Peter Smith were said to have improved the city more than any other two citizens. He was a Presidential elector in the 1892 election, as which he voted for John M. Palmer and Simon Bolivar Buckner. Ideologically, he was liberal.

Paddock was a member of the Texas House of Representatives, from January 11, 1881, to January 9, 1883, and again from January 14, 1913, to January 12, 1915. In his first term, he represented the 53rd district, and during his second term, represented the 52nd district. While in the House, he was chairman of the Committees on the Confederate Home and on Public Printing, and was vice-chairman of the Committee on Privileges, Suffrage and Elections. He was a member of the Committees on Educational Affairs; Internal Improvements.

In 1889 and 1890, Paddock was president of the Texas Spring Palace. From 1901 to November 9, 1909, Paddock was secretary of the Fort Worth Board of Trade. He wrote a four-volume book on the history of Fort Worth and North Texas. A major Fort Worth figure, he was made honorary president of its city council and was the namesake of the Paddock Viaduct. He retired from business in November or December 1909.

== Personal life and death ==
On December 10, 1867, Paddock married Emmie Harper, with whom he had four children. One of their daughters, Virgile Paddock, married pianist Guy Richardson Pitner. He was a member of the Old Side of the Presbyterian Church in the United States of America, as well as a member of the Benevolent and Protective Order of Elks; the Independent Order of Odd Fellows; the Knights of Honor; the Knights of Pythias; and the Royal Arch Masons. Physically, he was 5 ft 10.5 in (1.79 m) tall and had blue eyes.

Paddock died on January 9, 1922, aged 77, in Fort Worth, and was buried at Mount Olivet Cemetery, in Fort Worth. In 1922, Paddock Park, in Fort Worth, was named for him. In 2012, he was inducted into the Texas Trail of Fame. An archive of his papers is held by the Perry–Castañeda Library, of the University of Texas at Austin.
