= Whiteland, Texas =

Whiteland
- Unincorporated community
- Interactive map of Whiteland
- Location within Texas Whiteland (the United States)
- Coordinates: 31°9′52″N 99°30′21″W
- Country: United States
- State: Texas
- County: McCulloch County

Whiteland is an unincorporated community located halfway between Brady and Melvin in McCulloch County, Texas, United States.

== History ==
The community was named after the White family, who donated a land for this town to be established in. In 1911, this community was utilized as a stop along the Fort Worth and Rio Grande Railway. A communal post office opened in 1912 in which it closed during the mid-1950s. In 1914, the community had a store and a population of 50. The population significantly increased to 125 during the 1920s but due to the declining prosperity during the Great Depression, the population rapidly decreased to 40 by 1943. Reports suggests that there were 40 residents and a business by 1988.
