= Harvey Hilderbran =

American politician

Harvey Ray Hilderbran

Member of the Texas House of Representatives from the 53rd district
- In office January 1989 – January 13, 2015
- Preceded by: Gerald Geistweidt (then District 67)
- Succeeded by: Andrew Murr

Personal details
- Born: February 9, 1960 (age 66) Uvalde, Texas, U.S.
- Party: Republican
- Children: 2
- Education: Texas Tech University

Harvey Ray Hilderbran (born February 9, 1960) is an American politician and former member of the Texas House of Representatives from District 53, which included fifteen counties in central Texas. Hilderbran resides in Kerrville west of San Antonio.

== Career ==
In 2005, Hilderbran authored an amendment to ban first-cousin marriage to "prevent Texas from succumbing to the practices of taking child brides, incest, welfare abuse, and domestic violence" as part of an effort to discourage the polygamous Fundamentalist Church of Jesus Christ of Latter-Day Saints (FLDS) from furthering settling in the state. At the time of the amendment, their main compound was in Hilderbran's district. While Hilderbran stated that he would not have authored a bill solely to ban first-cousin marriage, he also said in an interview, "Cousins don't get married just like siblings don't get married. And when it happens you have a bad result. It's just not the accepted normal thing."

In 2008, the Texas Deer Association awarded Hilderbran the "Frank Madla Award for Representative of the Year", named for the late State Senator Frank L. Madla of San Antonio. Hilderbran was also named "Legislator of the Year" in 2007 by the Texas Municipal League, and was the recipient of the 2006 Distinguished Legislator Award by the Texas Recreation and Parks Society.

Hilderbran was a candidate for the Republican nomination for Texas Comptroller of Public Accounts in 2014.

Businessman Andrew Stevenson Murr of Junction, Texas, led the March 4 primary to succeed Hilderbran with 9,951 votes (41 percent). Robert Earl "Rob" Henneke (also born c. 1977), a Kerrville lawyer, received 7,030 (29 percent). In third place was Karen D. Harris (born c. 1969) of Kerrville with 5,840 votes (24 percent). Two others held the remaining 6 percent of the ballots cast. Andrew Murr faced the second highest vote-getter, Robert Earl "Rob" Henneke, in a May 27 runoff, winning 9,387 (60.6 percent) to 6,100 (39.4 percent). Without a Democratic Party nominee in District 53, Murr defeated the Libertarian nominee, Maximiliam Martin, 36,878 votes (89.9 percent) to 4,139 (10.1 percent) in the general election on November 4.

Texas House of Representatives
Preceded by Gerald Geistweidt (then District 67)	Member of the Texas House of Representatives from District 53 (Kerrville); 1989–2015	Succeeded by Andrew Murr
