= Texas's 57th House of Representatives district =

American legislative district

Texas's 57th State House of Representatives district
Representative
| Richard Hayes; R–Denton |
- Demographics: 54.6% White; 14.4% Black; 21.3% Hispanic; 7.6% Asian
- Population (2020) • Voting age: 186,531; 133,748

The Texas House of Representatives 57th district represents central and southern portions of Denton County, ranging from west to east. The district is currently represented by Richard Hayes, who was first elected in 2022.

== District description ==
The district includes all of Little Elm, Corinth, Lake Dallas, Argyle, and Ponder.

District 57 contains a portion of major highway I-35, while US 380 acts as a northern boundary. The Lewisville Lake Toll Bridge connects the smaller eastern part of the district, to the much larger western part of the district on the other side of Lewisville Lake.

The district borders Texas House District 106 to the east, 63 to the south, and 64 to both the north and the west.

== Members ==
- Allen Place (until 1993)
- Betty Denton (1993–1995)
- Barbara Rusling (1995–1997)
- Jim Dunnam (1997–2011)
- Marva Beck (2011–2013)
- Trent Ashby (2013–2023)
- Richard Hayes (since 2023)

== Elections ==
Texas House District 57 vote by party in recent elections
| Year | Democratic | Republican | Other |
|---|---|---|---|
| 2022 | - | 65.29% 39,934 | 34.71% 21,227 |
