= William Randall Gause =

American politician, lawyer and military officer (1831–1882)

Member of the Texas House of Representatives from the 53rd district
- In office January 14, 1879 – January 11, 1881
- Preceded by: Nicholas Henry Darnell
- Succeeded by: Buckley Burton Paddock

Personal details
- Born: May 30, 1831 Chester County, Pennsylvania, US
- Died: November 26, 1882 (aged 51) Fort Worth, Texas, US
- Resting place: Oakwood Cemetery
- Party: Democratic
- Parent: Jesse Gause (father)
- Occupation: Politician, lawyer, military officer

Military service
- Allegiance: Confederate States of America
- Branch/service: Confederate States Army
- Unit: 2nd Missouri Infantry Regiment; 3rd Missouri Infantry Regiment
- Battles/wars: American Civil War; Battle of Big Black River Bridge; Action at Blue Mills Landing; First Battle of Lexington; Siege of Corinth; Battle of Pea Ridge; Battle of Port Gibson; Siege of Vicksburg

William Randall Gause (May 30, 1831 – November 26, 1882) was an American politician, lawyer, and military officer. A Democrat, he was a member of the Texas House of Representatives.

Born in Chester County, Pennsylvania, Gause worked as a lawyer. During the American Civil War, he was an officer in the Confederate States Army. Following the war, he moved to Mississippi, and subsequently to Texas. He was a member of the House from 1879 to 1881.

== Early life ==
Gause was born on May 30, 1831, in Chester County, Pennsylvania, the son of Jesse Gause and Minerva Eliza (née Bryam) Gause. His father was a leader in The Church of Jesus Christ of Latter-day Saints, having previously been a Baptist.

Gause's mother did not convert, so he and his mother moved to Franklin County, Indiana, to live with her brother, George Bryam. On April 27, 1834, she married Elijah Davis. Gause was raised in Brownsville, Indiana. From 1849 to 1854, he lived in California, participating in its gold rush. He worked as a constable in Mariposa County. He later returned to Indiana.

== Military service ==
At the outbreak of the American Civil War, in 1861, Gause enlisted into the 2nd Missouri Infantry Regiment. He was subsequently promoted to captain then major. On January 1, 1862, he was transferred to the 3rd Missouri Infantry Regiment. With the third regiment, he was elected captain, being promoted to lieutenant colonel on May 8, then to colonel in November.

Gause fought in the Battle of Big Black River Bridge; the Action at Blue Mills Landing; the Siege of Corinth; the First Battle of Lexington; the Battle of Pea Ridge; and the Battle of Port Gibson. He defended in the Siege of Vicksburg, during which he was wounded and captured. He was paroled, and from March to June 1864, he commanded reserve forces in Mobile, Alabama. He then commanded a militia stationed along the Rappahannock River.

== Career ==
After returning to Indiana, Gause read law, being admitted to the bar in Liberty. In 1857, he moved to Gentry County, Missouri, practicing law there. After the war, he returned to Missouri, moving to Jackson, Mississippi in 1866. There, he entered into a partnership with James B. Clark. He was appointed Democratic Party canvasser of Hinds County, as which he somewhat successfully persuaded African Americans to vote Democrat. In 1869, he established a law practice with Fulton Anderson, who was a state legislator.

In 1870, Gause moved to Fort Worth, Texas. In 1874, Gause unsuccessfully ran for district attorney of the Fourteenth Judicial District, composed of Tarrant, Dallas, and Ellis Counties. He was a delegate to the 1876 Democratic state convention. He was a Democratic member of the Texas House of Representatives, from January 14, 1879, to January 11, 1881, representing the 53rd district, having been nominated by B. B. Paddock.

While serving, Gause was chairman of the Committee on Military Affairs, and was a member of the Committee on Assessment and Collection of Taxes; on Finance; on the Judiciary; and on Towns and City Corporations. He pushed for reforms, such as railway regulations and public education funding. Following his tenure, he remained active in Fort Worth civil affairs. He operated horse breeding companies while in Missouri, briefly in Mississippi, and in Texas.

== Personal life and death ==
On February 18, 1858, Gause married Amanda Carter (née Louthan) Curtis, with whom he had two children. He was a member of the Knights of Pythias. His wife died on July 16, 1867, and on June 19, 1882, married Louisa Cabanne Stevenson. His health began declining in the mid-1870s, with him dying on November 16, 1882, aged 51, in Fort Worth. He was buried on November 28, at Oakwood Cemetery.
