= Chris Paddie =

American politician (born 1974)

Member of the Texas House of Representatives from the 9th district
- In office January 8, 2013 – March 1, 2022
- Preceded by: Wayne Christian
- Succeeded by: Trent Ashby

Personal details
- Born: February 18, 1974 (age 52) Center, Texas, USA
- Party: Republican
- Spouse: Brooke Hanszen Paddie
- Children: 2
- Education: Texas A&M University
- Occupation: Radio broadcaster

Christopher David Paddie (born February 18, 1974) is an American politician from Marshall, Texas. He previously served as a Texas state representative for District 9 in East Texas.

== Service ==
Paddie is a former mayor and city commissioner of Marshall, the county seat of Harrison County. He is the former general manager of KMHT radio, where he hosted a daily talk show. He is the former chairman of the Greater Marshall Chamber of Commerce and president of the Boys and Girls Club of the Big Pines. Paddie unseated the incumbent state Representative Wayne Christian, now one of the three members of the Texas Railroad Commission, in the Republican primary election held in 2012.

Paddie ran without opposition in the general election held on November 6, 2018.

A Republican, he resigned his seat in the chamber on March 1, 2022. He announced in September 2021 that he would not seek re-election after he was redistricted out of his seat in the House.

== Political views ==
Paddie voted for Senate Bill 5, which would ban abortions after twenty weeks and would require doctors to have admitting privileges at hospitals within thirty miles of their office. Parts of the law were declared unconstitutional by the Supreme Court in Whole Woman's Health v. Hellerstedt.

In May 2021, Paddie killed legislation that would have banned taxpayer-funded lobbying of the legislature. He procedurally postponed the bill's consideration to the birthday of the legislation's main supporter, State Representative Mayes Middleton.

== Personal life ==
Paddie was born in Center, Texas, and reared in Carthage. He graduated from Carthage High School and Texas A&M University with a bachelor's degree in Industrial Distribution.

After graduation, Paddie moved to Houston, where he sold safety equipment and industrial products. While in Houston, he married Brooke Hanszen, his high school sweetheart. The Paddies returned home to East Texas and settled in Marshall, where he became the general manager of the KMHT radio station.

Paddie was elected to the Marshall City Commission in 2008. He was selected by his colleagues to be mayor.

Paddie was first elected to the Texas House, District 9, in November 2012 and was re-elected to subsequent terms in 2014 and 2016.

Texas House of Representatives
Preceded by Wayne Christian	Member of the Texas House of Representatives from the 9th district 2013–2022	Succeeded by Trent Ashby
