= Richard Hayes (Texas politician) =

American politician

Member of the Texas House of Representatives from the 57th district
- Incumbent
- Assumed office January 10, 2023
- Preceded by: Trent Ashby

Personal details
- Born: Denton, Texas, U.S.
- Party: Republican
- Education: Texas Christian University (BA); Texas A&M University(MBA); St. Mary's University School of Law(JD)
- Occupation: Attorney
- Website: Campaign website

Richard Hayes is an American politician from Texas who is the Republican member of the Texas House of Representatives from District 57, serving since 2023.
