= Betty Denton =

American politician (born 1943)

Member of the Texas House of Representatives from the 57th district
- In office January 12, 1993 – January 10, 1995
- Preceded by: Allen Place
- Succeeded by: Barbara Rusling

Member of the Texas House of Representatives from the 56th district
- In office January 11, 1983 – January 12, 1993
- Preceded by: Gerald Geistweidt
- Succeeded by: Kip Averitt

Member of the Texas House of Representatives from district 35A
- In office January 11, 1977 – January 11, 1983
- Preceded by: District created
- Succeeded by: District abolished

Personal details
- Born: August 19, 1943 (age 82) Waco, Texas
- Party: Democratic
- Spouse: Lane Denton

Betty Denton (born August 19, 1943) is an American politician who served in the Texas House of Representatives from 1977 to 1995. She was upset in the 1994 tidal wave election by Republican challenger Barbara Rusling.
