= Paddock Viaduct =

- U.S. National Register of Historic Places
- Texas State Antiquities Landmark
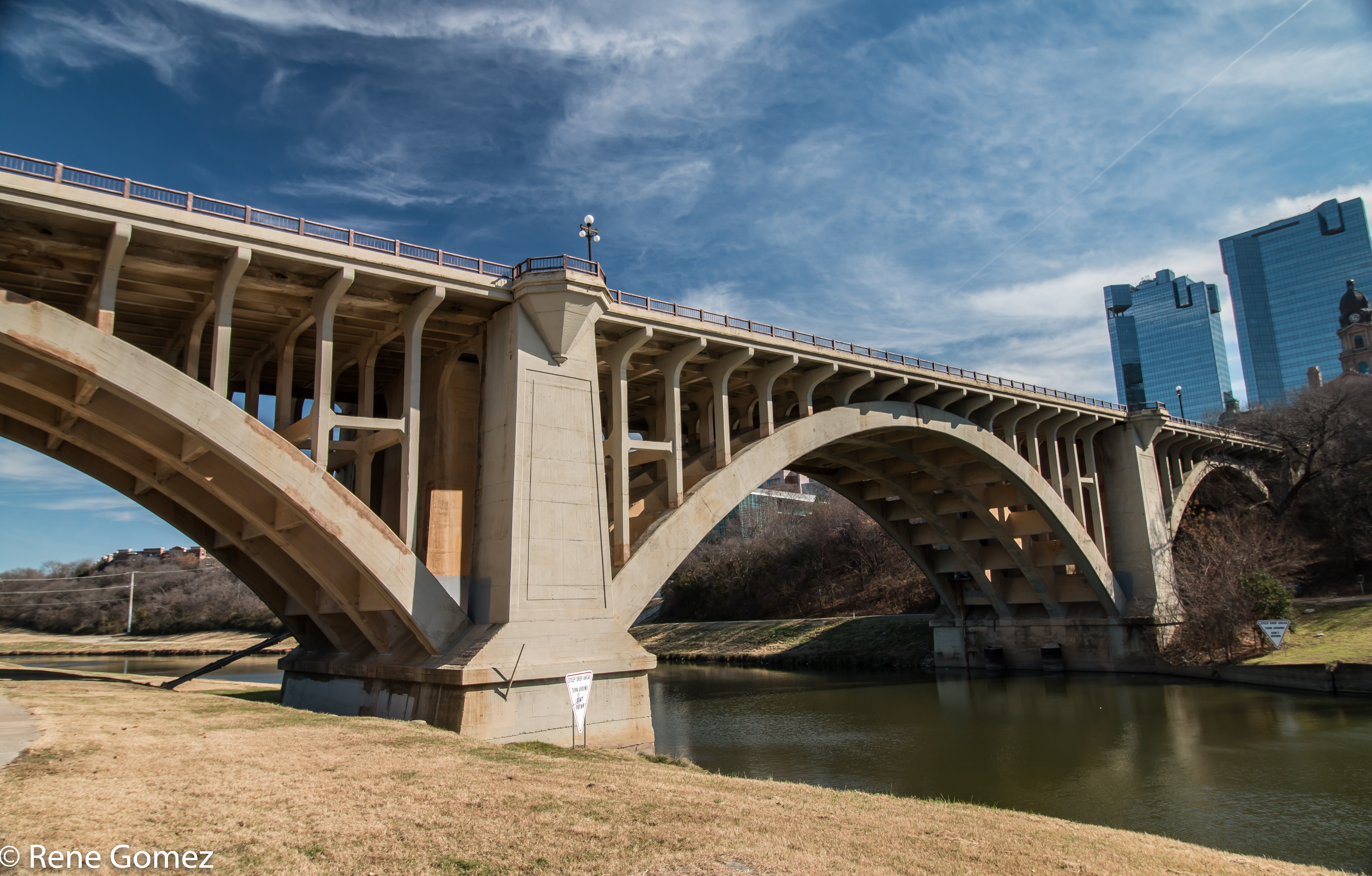
- Paddock Viaduct in 2017

- Location within Texas Location within the United States
- Location: Main Street, Fort Worth, Texas
- Coordinates: 32°45′36″N 97°20′5″W
- Area: 3 acres (1.2 ha)
- Built: 1912
- Built by: Hannan-Hickey Brothers
- Engineer: Brenneke and Fay
- NRHP reference No.: 76002068
- TSAL No.: 8200000575

Significant dates
- Added to NRHP: March 15, 1976
- Designated TSAL: January 1, 1981

The Paddock Viaduct, also known as the Main Street Viaduct, is a reinforced concrete bridge spanning the Trinity River in Fort Worth, Texas. Low-water crossings and ferries originally provided the only access across the Trinity River at this location, connecting the downtown area of Fort Worth with northern sections of the city. A two-lane suspension bridge, constructed near this site in the 1890s, proved inadequate for the growing population. This span, designed by the St. Louis engineering firm of Brenneke and Fay, was completed in 1914. It was the first reinforced concrete arch in the nation to use self-supporting, reinforcing steel. The bridge is named in honor of B. B. Paddock, former State Legislator and Mayor of the City (1980).

The bridge was built in 1913 and renovated in 1965 and 1988. It was added to the National Register of Historic Places on March 15, 1976.

== Photo gallery ==
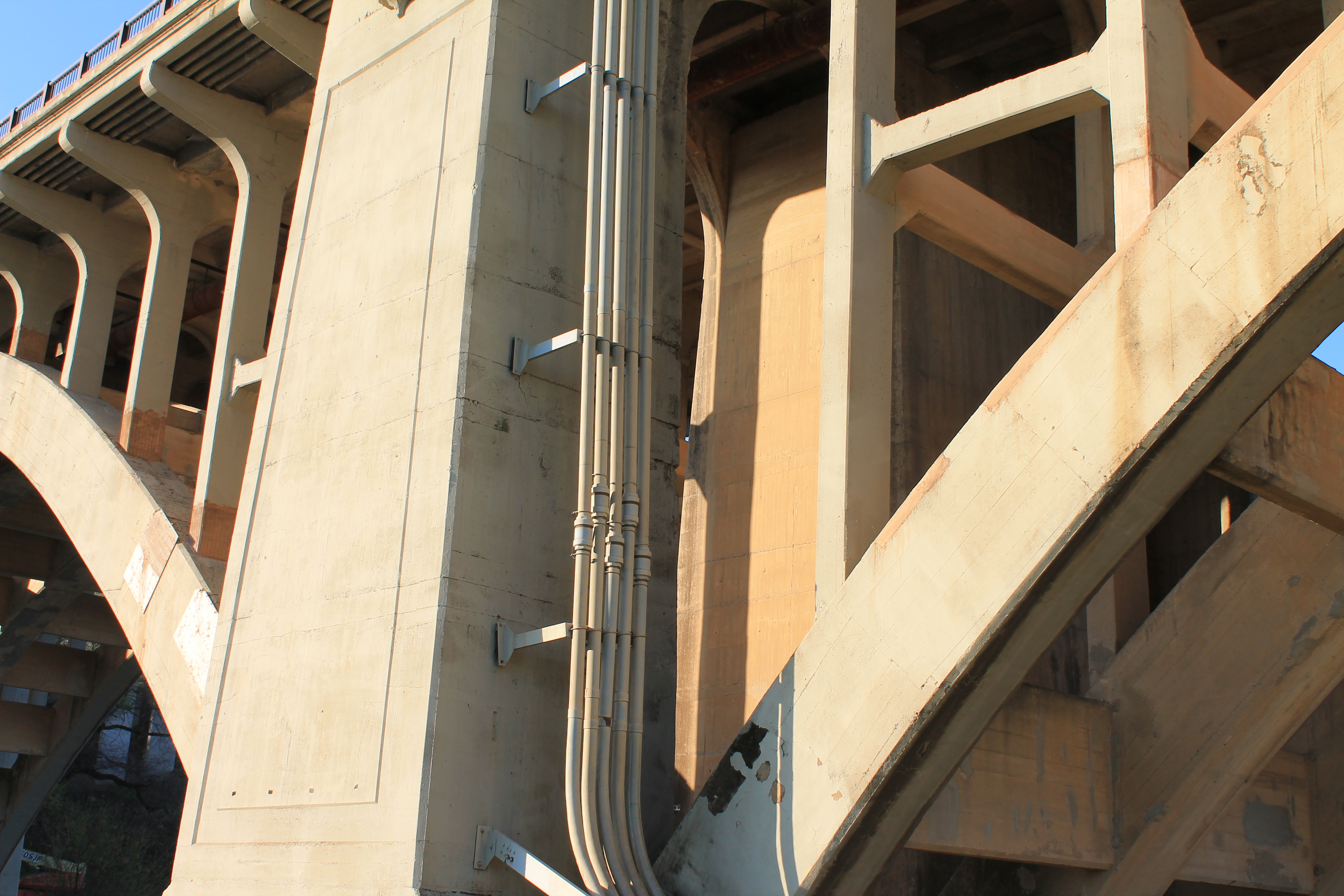

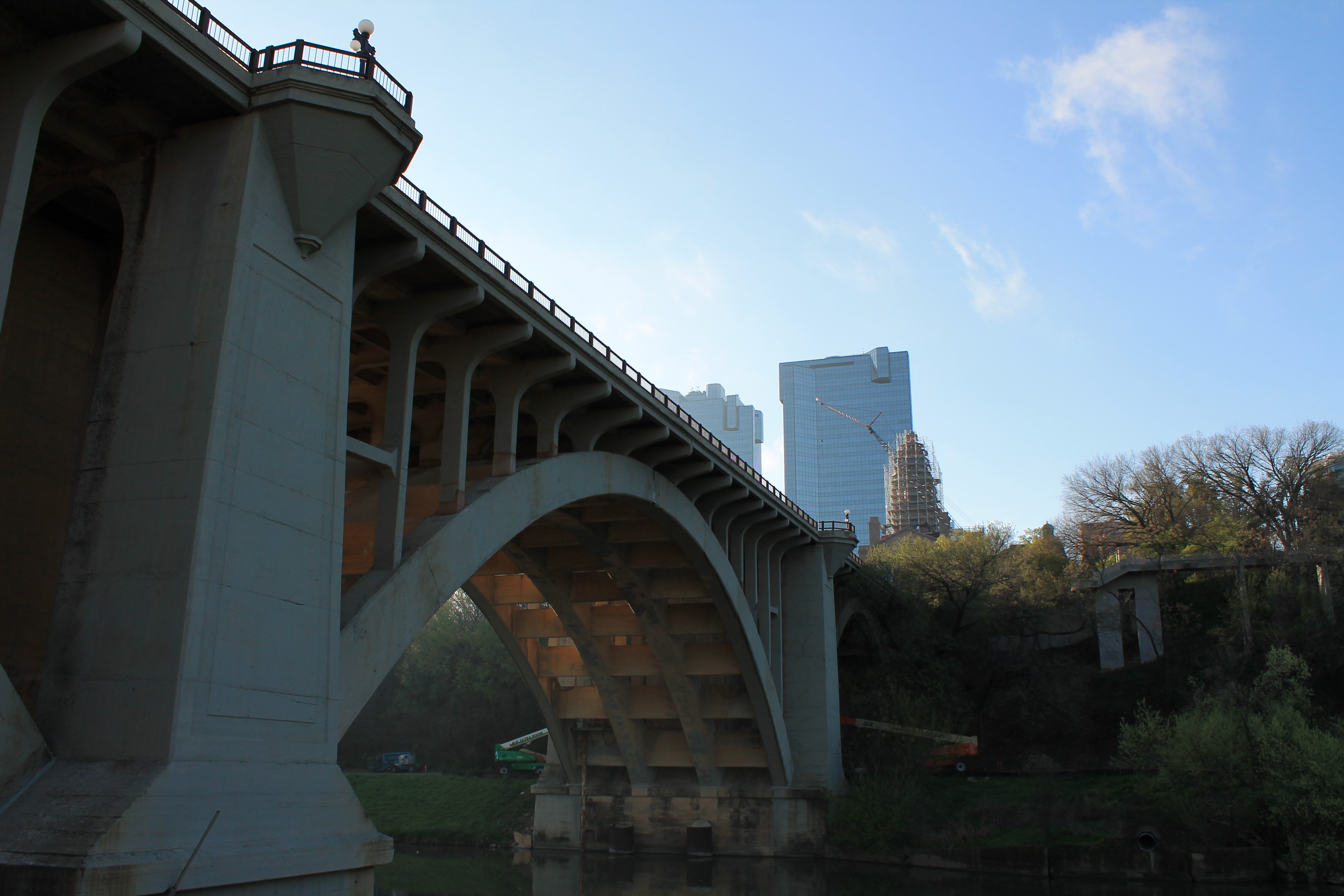

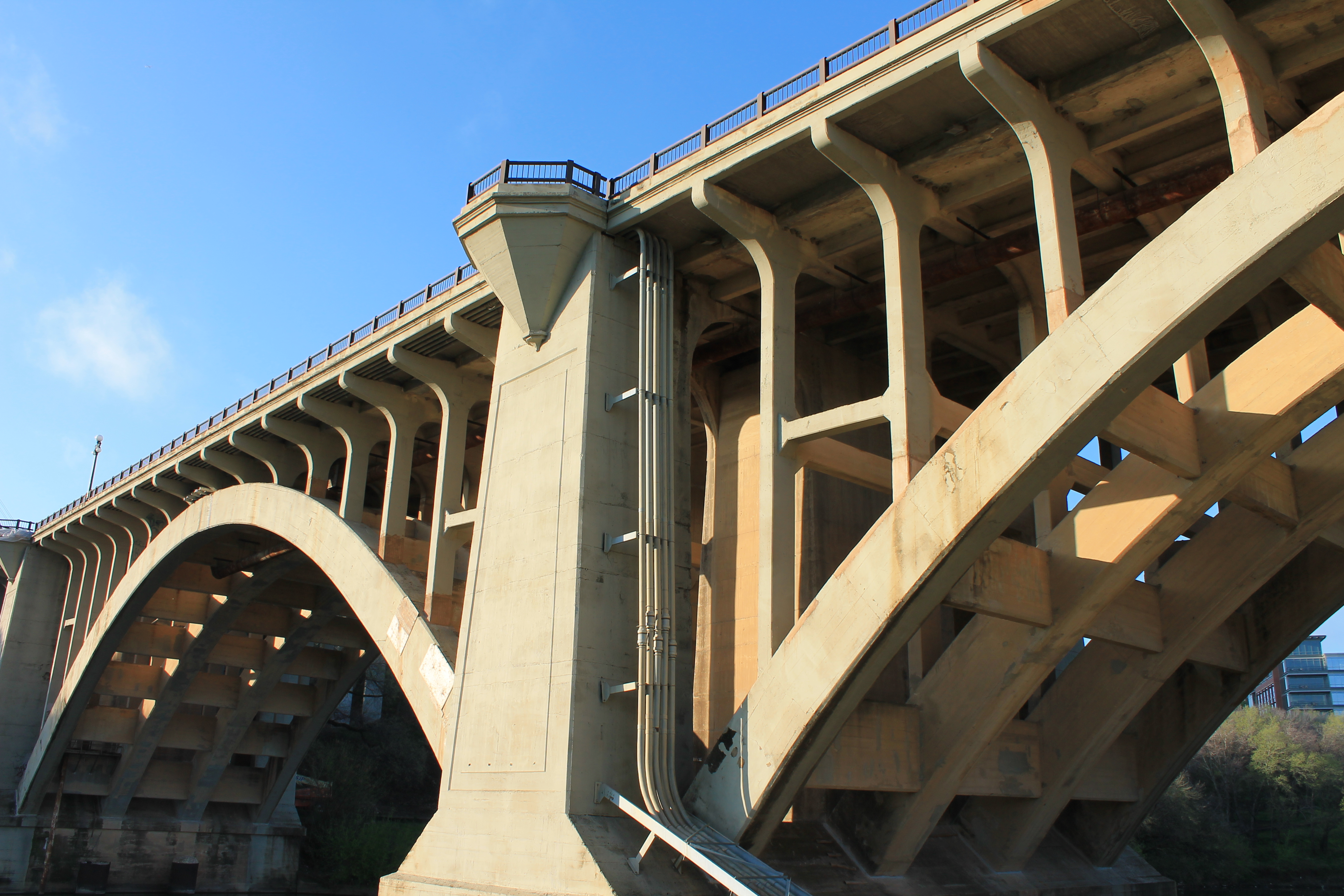

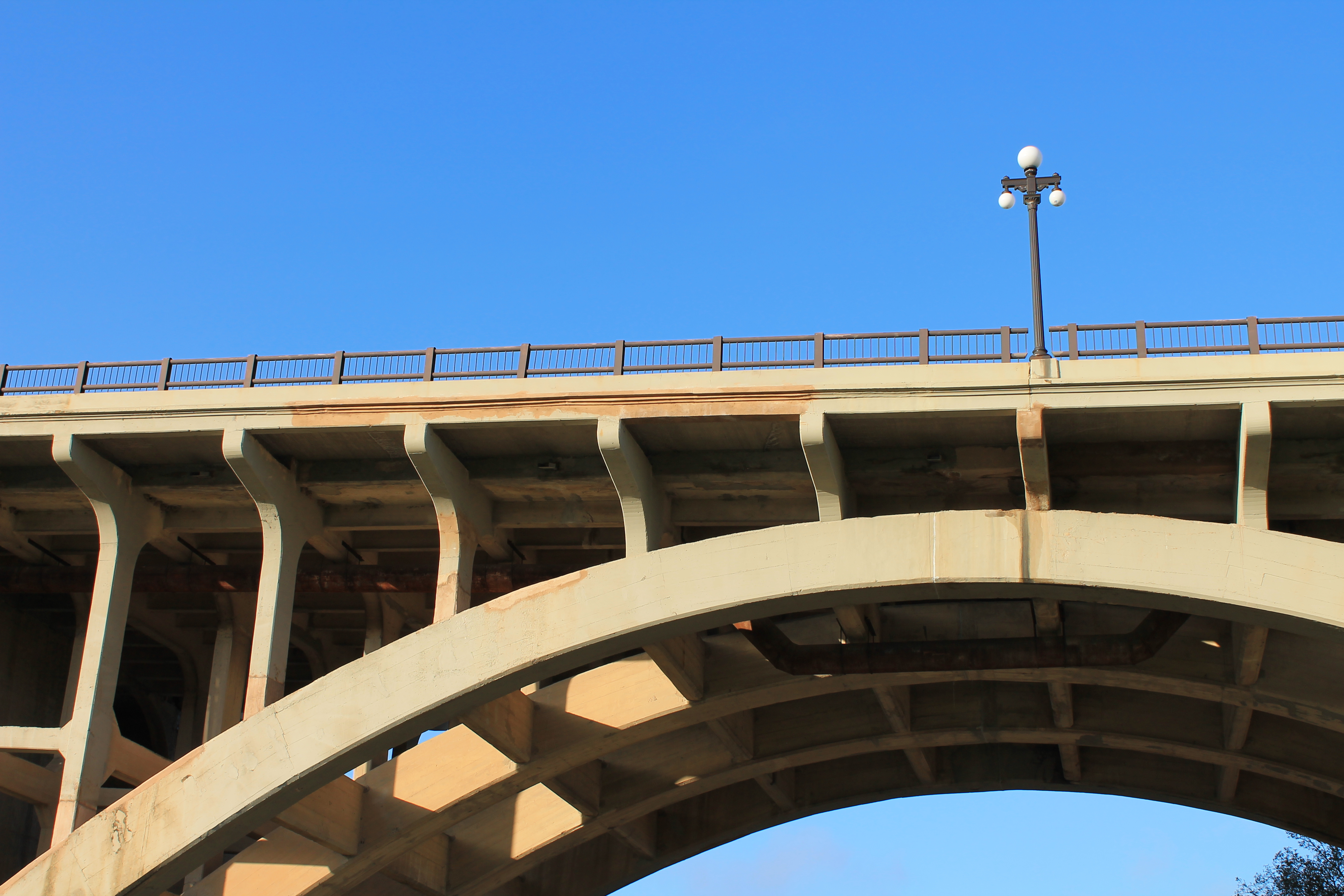

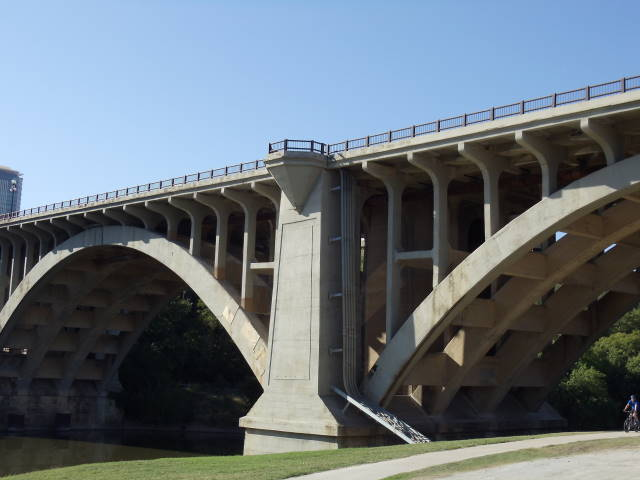

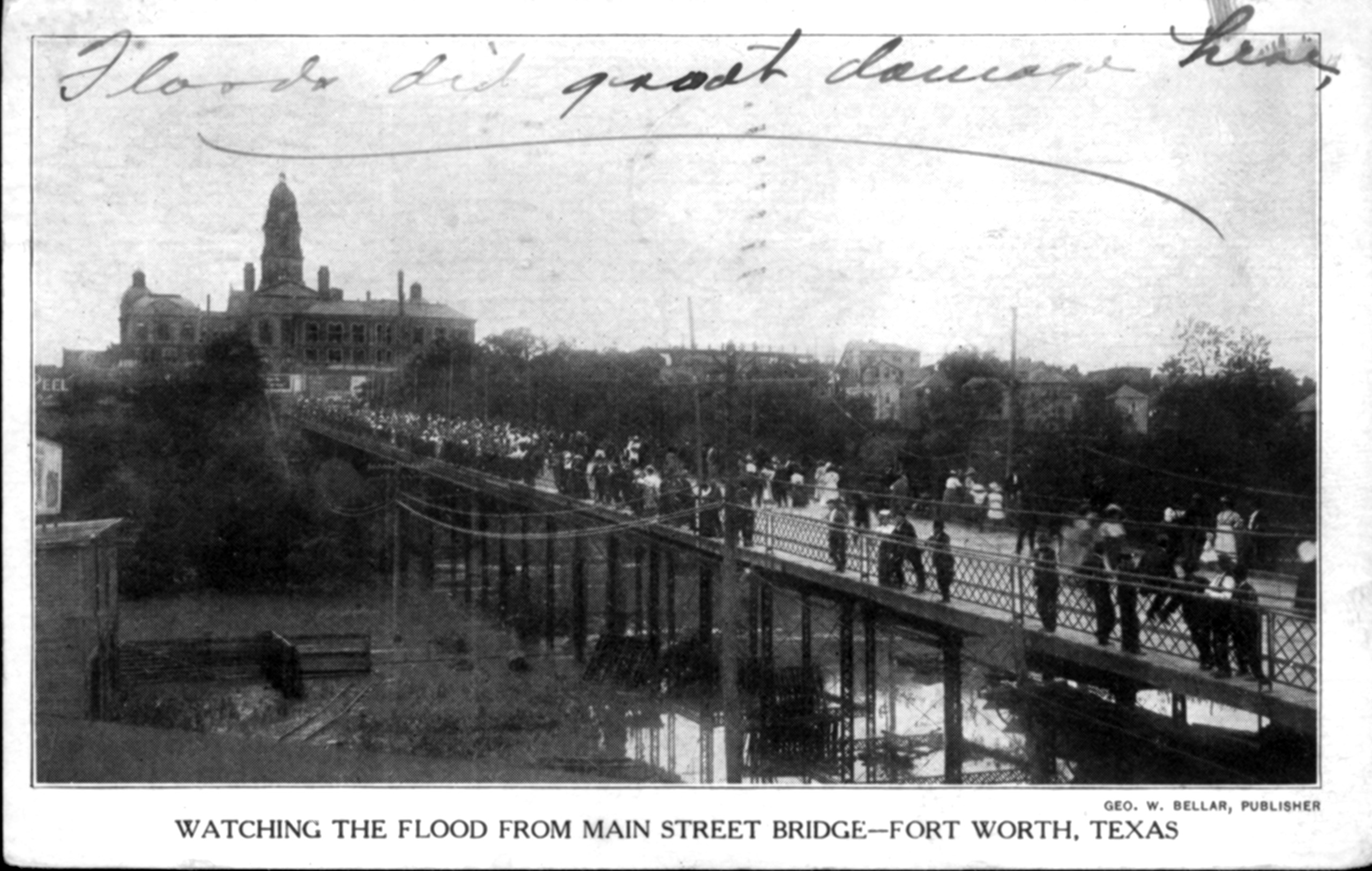
Postcard of the predecessor Main Street Bridge, 1908

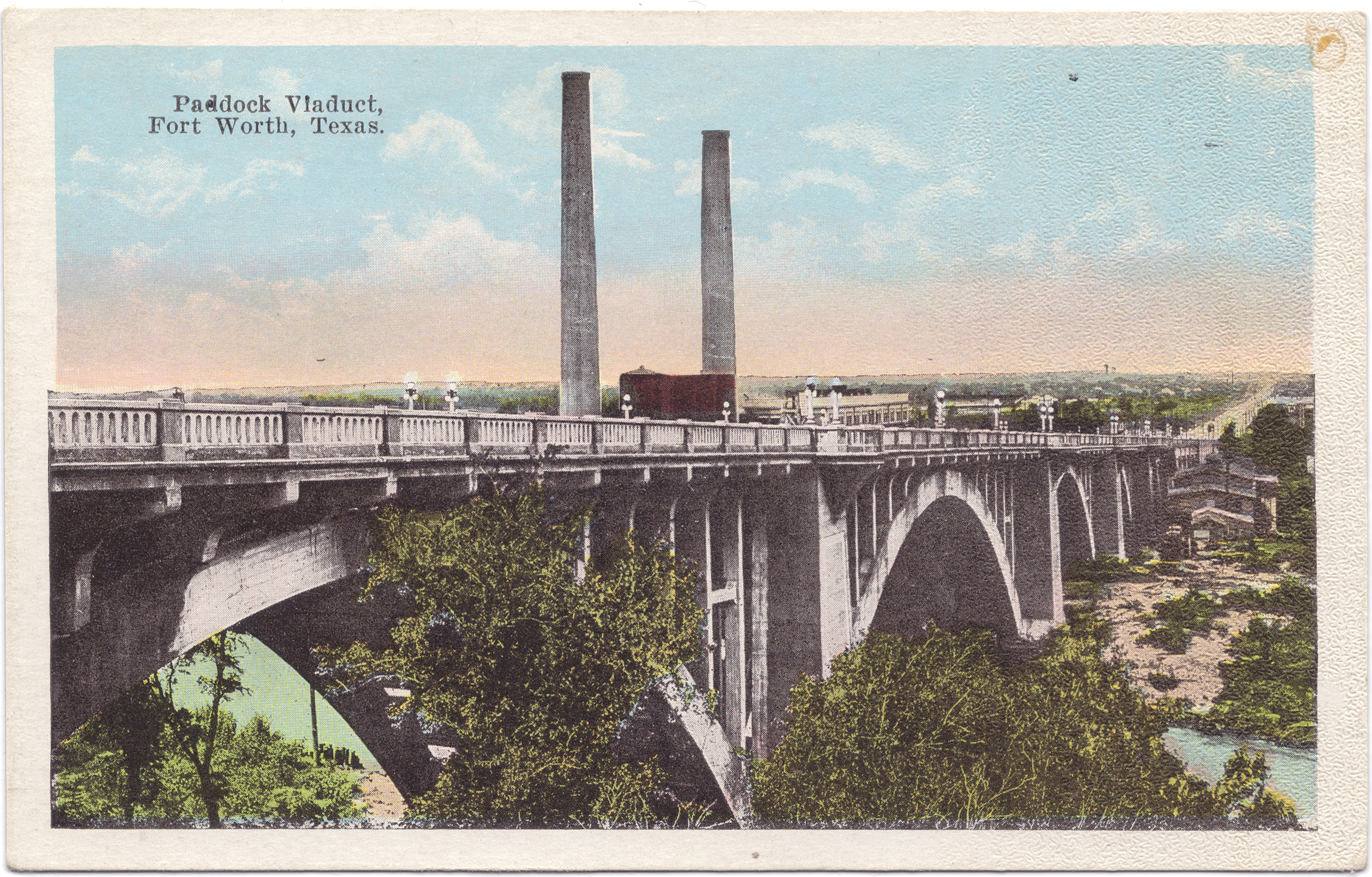
Postcard of the Paddock Viaduct, 1920

== See also ==
- List of bridges documented by the Historic American Engineering Record in Texas
- National Register of Historic Places listings in Tarrant County, Texas
