= Trent Ashby =

American politician (born 1972)

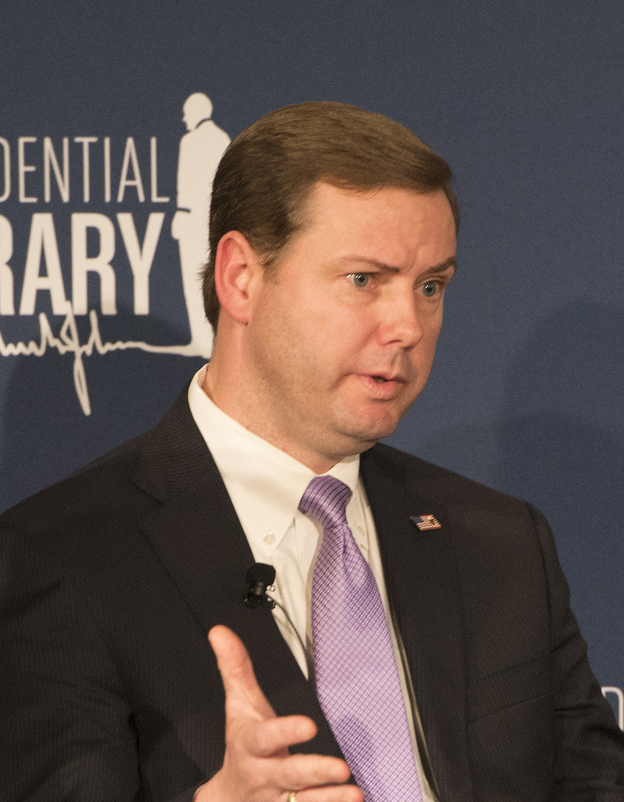

Member-elect of the Texas Senate from the 3rd district
- Assuming office January 2027
- Succeeding: Robert Nichols

Member of the Texas House of Representatives
- Incumbent
- Assumed office January 10, 2023
- Preceded by: Chris Paddie
- Constituency: 9th district
- In office January 8, 2013 – January 10, 2023
- Preceded by: Marva Beck
- Succeeded by: Richard Hayes
- Constituency: 57th district

Personal details
- Born: Trenton Edward Ashby; October 9, 1972 (age 54) Rusk County, Texas, U.S.
- Party: Republican
- Spouse: Nickie
- Children: 2
- Education: Texas A&M University (BA)
- Occupation: Businessman
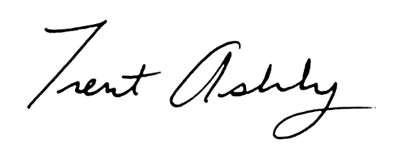
- Signature

Trenton Edward Ashby (born October 9, 1972) is an American politician in the state of Texas, who currently represents district 9 of the Texas House of Representatives. He previously represented district 57, which at that time was composed of Angelina County, Houston County, Leon County, Madison County, San Augustine County, and Trinity County. Prior to being a state representative, Ashby was a local politician and business owner.

== Early life ==
Trenton Edward Ashby was born on October 9, 1972, in Rusk County, Texas. He was raised in rural Rusk County on a dairy farm and diversified livestock operation. While growing up, Ashby was an elected leader in his local FFA and 4-H youth organizations. Graduating from Henderson High School, Ashby would go on to attend Texas A&M University where he was elected to the Student Senate, Senior Yell Leader, and Class Treasurer. He graduated from Texas A&M with a bachelor's degree in agricultural economics in 1996, and is still affiliated with Texas A&M through the Texas A&M Letterman's Association and Association of Former Students.

== Political career ==
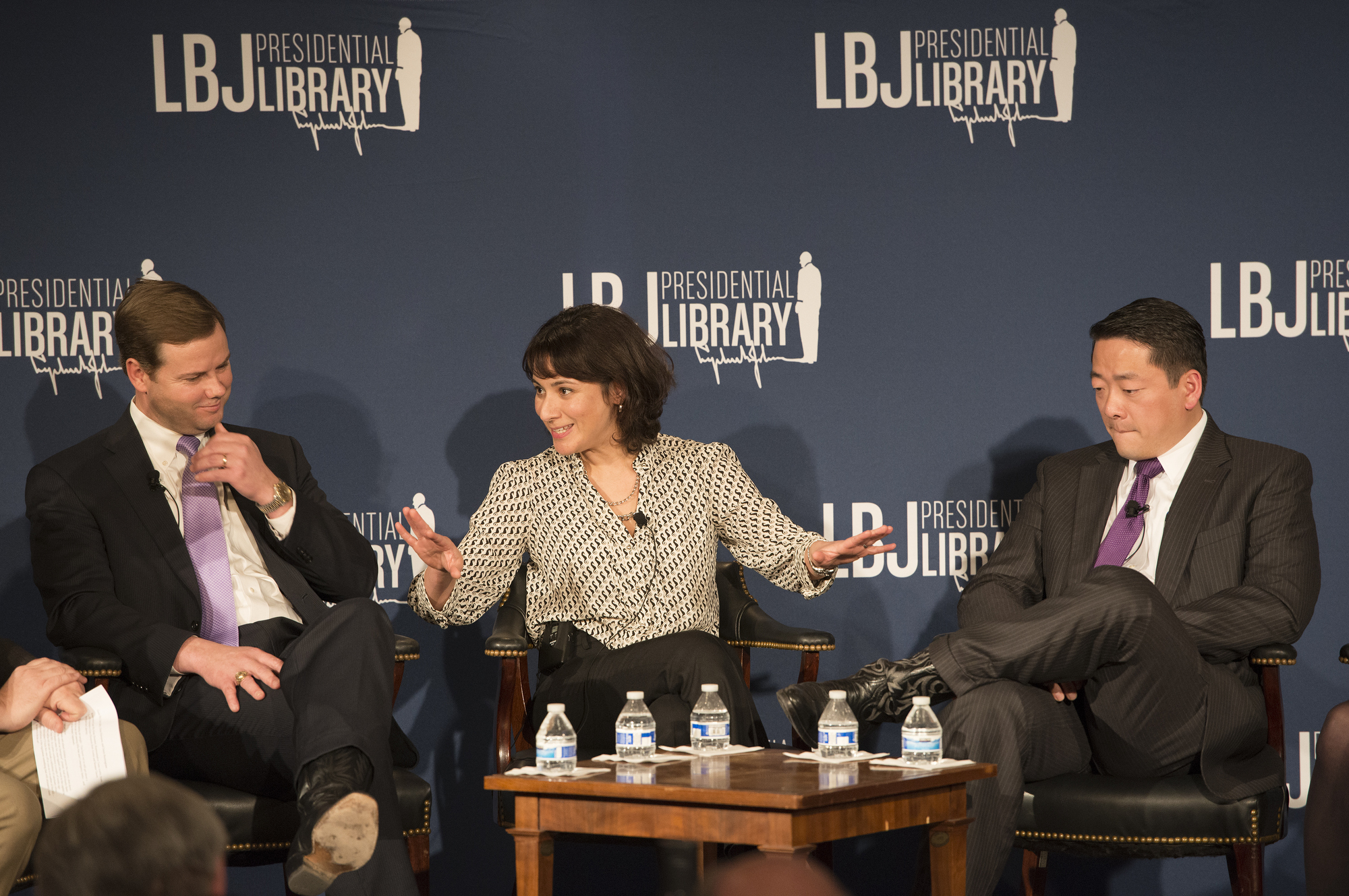
Ashby (left) at the LBJ Foundation

Ashby is a former president and member of the nonpartisan Lufkin Independent School District Board of Trustees; his tenure on the school board started in 2007 and ended in 2012. He served as president of the board in his final 2 years.

In 2012, Ashby entered the Republican primary to represent District 57 of the Texas House of Representatives, he was challenging incumbent representative Marva Beck. Ultimately, Ashby won the primary with 58.1% of the votes and was unopposed in the general election. He was sworn in to represent District 57 on January 8, 2013. He was reelected, by large margins or was unopposed, in 2014, 2016, 2018, and 2020. In 2022, after redistricting, the district was numbered as District 9; Ashby ran to represent the newly-numbered District and was again successful.

In October 2020, Ashby filed for candidacy to be speaker of Texas House of Representatives. Ashby and Dade Phelan (R—Beaumont) were considered the primary contenders before Ashby backed out of the race, endorsing Geanie Morrison, after Phelan announced he had the votes to win the speakership. Ultimately, Phelan was elected the speaker.

=== Political positions ===
KTRE characterized Ashby as a "conservative Republican."

He supported and co-sponsored several bills restricting abortion access, including Texas House Bill 2 which banned abortion passed 20 weeks of gestation.

== Personal life ==
Ashby is a resident of Lufkin, Texas, with his wife Nickie and two sons. The Ashby family are active members of Harmony Hill Baptist Church. Additionally, he is active in several local non-profit organizations.

Texas House of Representatives
Preceded by Chris Paddie	Member of the Texas House of Representatives from the 9th district 2023–present	Incumbent
Preceded by Marva Beck	Member of the Texas House of Representatives from the 57th district 2013–2023	Succeeded by Richard Hayes
