= Gerald Geistweidt =

American politician (1948–2019)

Member of the Texas House of Representatives from the 67th district
- In office January 11, 1983 – January 10, 1989
- Preceded by: Chip Staniswalis
- Succeeded by: Harvey Hilderbran

Member of the Texas House of Representatives from the 56th district
- In office February 9, 1979 – January 11, 1983
- Preceded by: James E. Nugent
- Succeeded by: Betty Denton

Personal details
- Born: January 20, 1948 San Antonio, Texas
- Died: August 13, 2019 (aged 71) Mason, Texas
- Party: Republican

Gerald Geistweidt (January 20, 1948 – August 13, 2019) was an American politician who served in the Texas House of Representatives from 1979 to 1989.

He died on August 13, 2019, in Mason, Texas at age 71.
