= Andrew Murr =

Texas legislator (born 1977)

Member of the Texas House of Representatives from the 53rd district
- In office January 13, 2015 – January 13, 2025
- Preceded by: Harvey Hilderbran
- Succeeded by: Wesley Virdell

Personal details
- Born: Andrew Stevenson Murr; April 23, 1977 (age 49)
- Party: Republican
- Spouse: Amanda
- Children: 4
- Education: Texas A&M University (BS); Texas Tech University (JD)
- Occupation: Attorney, Rancher
- Website: Official website

Andrew Stevenson Murr (born April 23, 1977) is an American attorney, rancher and politician who served as a member of the Texas House of Representatives from the 53rd district. Elected in 2014, he assumed office in 2015. His maternal grandfather was Coke Stevenson, the 35th governor of Texas. Murr announced in November 2023 that he was not going to run for re-election.

== Early life and education ==
Murr was raised on a farm in Kimble County, Texas and attended schools in the Junction Independent School District. He earned a Bachelor of Science degree in agricultural development from Texas A&M University and a Juris Doctor from the Texas Tech University School of Law.

== Career ==
Murr became a Kimble County Judge in 2008, serving until 2013. He was appointed to the Concho Valley Regional Review Board by then-Governor Rick Perry in 2011. Murr was elected to the Texas House of Representatives in 2014 and assumed office in 2015. In the 2019–2020 legislative session, Murr served as the vice chair of the Juvenile Justice & Family Issues Committee. In the 2020–2021 session, he was the chair of the House Corrections Committee.

In the 2022–2023 session, Murr was chair of the House Committee on General Investigating, which directed two high-profile investigations that session:

- an investigation against state representative Bryan Slaton, for providing alcohol to and having sexual relations with a 19-year old legislative aide and then attempting to cover up the incident (though Slaton resigned, he was unanimously expelled from the House on May 9, 2023), and
- an investigation against Texas Attorney General Ken Paxton, who was impeached by the House on May 27, 2023, on twenty articles involving securities fraud, abuse of office, and retaliation against whistleblowers. Murr was named one of twelve House members, and the chair, who will serve as managers during Paxton's impeachment trial in the Texas Senate, which began on September 5, 2023. Paxton was acquitted of all charges on September 16, 2023.

Texas House of Representatives
Preceded by Harvey Hilderbran	Member of the Texas House of Representatives from the 53rd district 2015–2025	Succeeded by Wes Virdell
