= Lane Denton =

American politician

Member of the Texas House of Representatives from the 35-1 district
- In office January 12, 1971 – January 11, 1977

Personal details
- Party: Democratic
- Spouse: Betty Denton

Lane Denton is an American politician who served as a Democratic member for the 35-1 district of the Texas House of Representatives.
