= Barbara Rusling =

Texas politician

Member of the Texas House of Representatives from the 57th district
- In office January 10, 1995 – January 15, 1997
- Preceded by: Betty Denton
- Succeeded by: Jim Dunnam

Personal details
- Born: Barbara Neubert; November 11, 1945 (age 80) St. Louis, Missouri, U.S.
- Party: Republican
- Spouse: Robert B. Rusling (died 2004)
- Education: Baylor University; Vanderbilt University (BA)
- Profession: Real estate broker

Barbara Neubert Rusling (née Neubert; born November 11, 1945) is a real estate broker and former Texas legislator who represented the 57th district of the Texas House of Representatives from 1995 to 1997. She is a Republican.

== Background ==
Barbara Neubert was born on November 11, 1945, in St. Louis, Missouri. She attended Baylor University and Vanderbilt University where she earned a BA. Rusling is president and principal broker of Caldwell Banker Hallmark Realty, a position she has held since 1983. Formerly, from 1976 to 1983, she was in real estate sales and was a trainer. She was married to Robert B. Rusling, whom died in 2004. Her residence is in Waco, Texas.

== Political career ==
A Republican, Rusling served in the Texas House of Representatives for District 57 during the 74th legislature from January 10, 1995, to January 14, 1997. She was preceded by Betty Denton and was succeeded by Jim Dunnam.
