= Wesley Virdell =

American politician

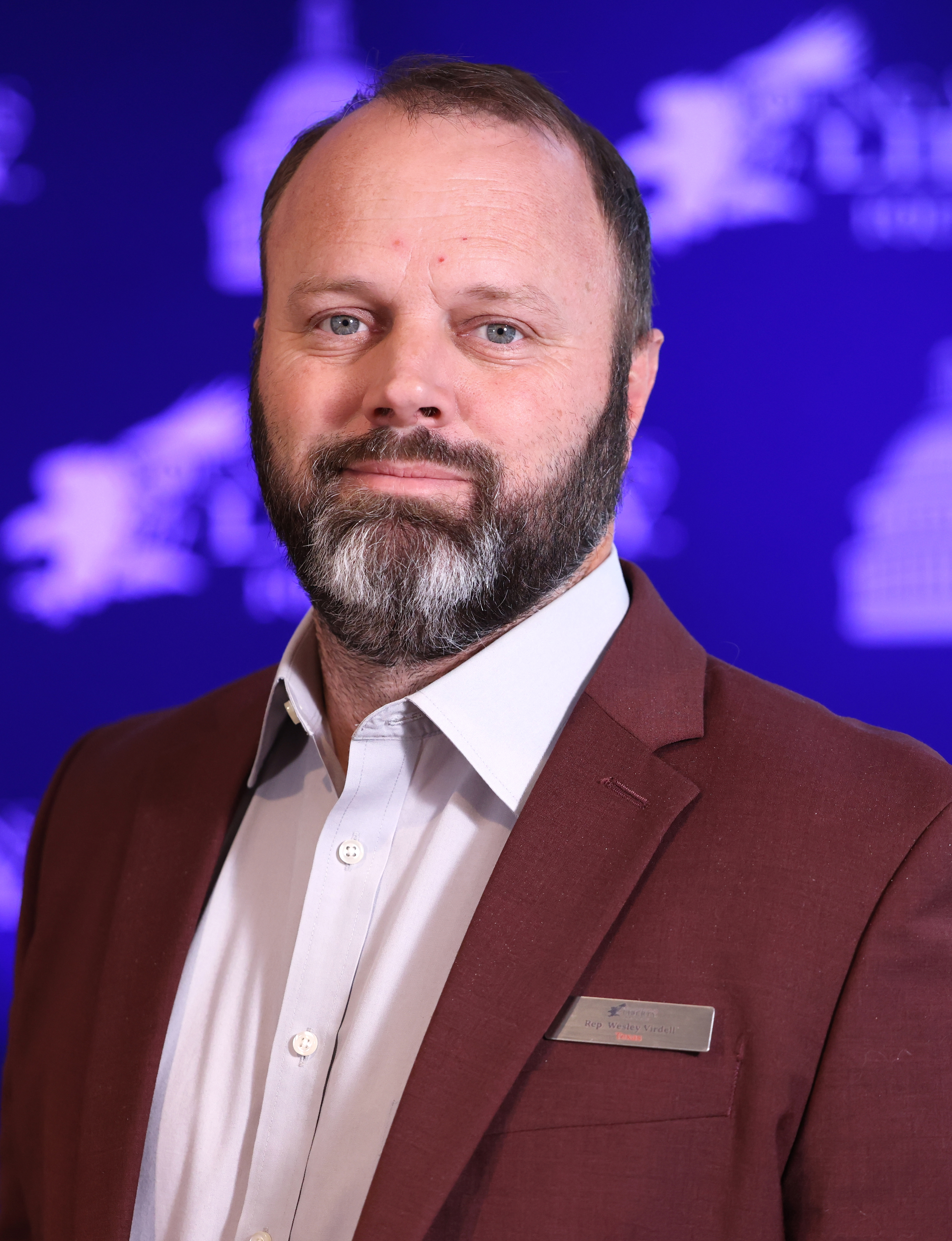
- Virdell at the 2024 Hazlitt Summit hosted by Young Americans for Liberty Foundation

Member of the Texas House of Representatives from the 53rd district
- Incumbent
- Assumed office January 14, 2025
- Preceded by: Andrew Murr

Personal details
- Born: Brownwood, Texas, U.S.
- Party: Republican

Wesley Virdell is an American politician. He serves as a Republican member for the 53rd district of the Texas House of Representatives.

== Life and career ==
Virdell was born in Brownwood, Texas. He attended Brady High School, graduating in 1998. He served in the United States Air Force.

In March 2024, Virdell defeated Hatch Smith in the Republican primary election for the 53rd district of the Texas House of Representatives. In November 2024, he defeated Joe Herrera and B. W. Holk in the general election, winning 76 percent of the vote. He succeeded Andrew Murr. He assumed office on January 14, 2025.

In February 2025, Virdell sponsored a bill to ban gender affirming care for transgender individuals of all ages.
