= Jim Dunnam =

American politician (born 1963)

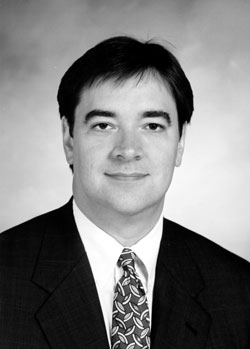

Member of the Texas House of Representatives from the 57th district
- In office January 14, 1997 – January 11, 2011
- Preceded by: Barbara Rusling
- Succeeded by: Marva Beck

Personal details
- Born: James Robert Dannam; December 12, 1963 (age 62) McLennan County, Texas, U.S.
- Party: Democratic
- Spouse: Michelle (Mansfield)
- Education: Baylor University
- Profession: Attorney

James Robert Dunnam (born December 12, 1963) is an American state politician and prominent trial lawyer from Texas. He was a Democratic member of the Texas House of Representatives, representing the 57th District since his election in 1996 from January 14, 1997, until January 11, 2011. He is the grandson of William Vance Dunnam, who served as a member of the Texas House of Representatives from Coryell County in the 35th Legislature, 1917–1918.

In history, Dunnam will be best known as "the leader of the Democrats in the lower chamber, distinguished for years as the sharpest and most persistent thorn in the conservative paw," as the New York Times reported in November, 2010. He is acknowledged as engineering the "Killer Ds" walkout to Ardmore, Oklahoma in 2003, to postpone consideration of Tom DeLay's mid-decade redistricting plan. The walkout is credited with starting serious media inquiry into DeLay's actions as majority leader of the United States House of Representatives, which ultimately led to DeLay's resignation in 2006.

Dunnam was educated at Baylor University, where he earned an undergraduate business degree in 1986 and a J.D. degree in 1987. Born in McLennan County, Texas, Dunnam is the second son of Clyde Vance Dunnam and Elnora Eveline Hohertz. He began working in 1988 as a member of his family's law firm, Dunnam & Dunnam, L.L.P., which was founded by his grandfather in 1925.

== Political career ==
One of just two Democrats to defeat a Republican incumbent in the 1996 elections, Dunnam arrived in Austin marked for potential advancement. At the end of his first session, he had reversed budget cuts to a local college that occurred two years before. At the end of his second session, he was noted as a "comer" and potential top legislator. He fulfilled that prediction in the next session. At the end of the 2001 legislative session, Dunnam was hailed by Texas Monthly as one of Texas's ten best legislators because his "success in the House rested on talent rather than title and [he] could do what [he was] big enough to do. Though he lacked a chairmanship or even a seat on a powerful committee, Jim Dunnam was big enough to pass two of the session's biggest and best bills: charter-school reform and tougher restrictions on open containers of alcohol in cars." His other legislative concerns included public schools, economic development, affordable health care, the Bosque River, higher education, and evaluation and re-authorization of the State Bar of Texas and the State Board of Law Examiners.

Dunnam was elected as the leader of the House Democratic Caucus from 2003 to 2011. As the first leader of a Democratic minority since Reconstruction, Dunnam was charged with shepherding a demoralized caucus through a "highly partisan House." Even observers who disagreed with his tactics continued to recognize his abilities as a legislator. "In mastery of the legislative arts," Texas Monthly noted in moving Dunnam from the best to worst list, he "has few peers and fewer superiors."

In the aftermath of the November 2008 elections in which House Democrats won 74 seats (just 2 shy of a majority), Dunnam played a pivotal role in ousting Tom Craddick as Speaker of the House and replacing him with Joe Straus. In a late November 2008 meeting of the House Democratic Caucus, Dunnam set in motion a series of events that would ultimately remove Craddick from power. He "pulled a blank sheet of paper out of his pocket, signed it and declared he'd publicly release his pledge to oppose Craddick whether the group signed the pledge or not." This convinced sixty-one of the House Democrats to sign the one-line pledge that night, while three more signed over the next two days. The list, kept "secret until Craddick's GOP opposition had gelled," was sealed in an envelope and kept "locked in the desk of a trusted Democratic operative." When it was released that Straus was the pick of a small group of Republicans known as the ABC's (for "Anybody But Craddick"), who publicly opposed Craddick's authoritarian reign over the House, Straus sent a consultant to retrieve the Dunnam list, and with the 13 pledges he had received from House Republicans, the Democrats' pledges put him well over the 76 votes he needed to win the speakership.

He was appointed to several committees in his career, including the Texas Supreme Court Rules Advisory Committee, 1998–2003, the Texas Sunset Advisory Committee, 2001–2005, House Select Committee on Judicial Interpretation of Law, and the House Committee for Oversight of Family Law and Texas Family Code. He served as Chair of the Interim Committee on Charter Schools, the Select Committee on Federal Economic Stabilization Funding, and as vice-chair of the Committee on Criminal Jurisprudence.

Dunnam lost his bid for re-election in November 2010, one of the "casualties of the Republican blood bath" of the November, 2010, elections which saw Texas Democrats lose 22 seats in the Texas House as Democrats lost state legislative chambers across the county and their majority in the U.S. House of Representatives. He carried his home county of McLennan on election night while losing the other, more rural counties to political neophyte Marva Beck.

Dunnam remains active in the political sphere, including playing keyboards for the last decade with The Bad Precedents, the Official Band of the Texas Legislature. Dunnam also serves on the Board of Contributors at the Waco Tribune Herald.

== Legal career ==
Dunnam's legal career has been marked by his handling of prominent litigation nationally and in Texas. Less than 5 years after being licensed as a lawyer in Texas, Dunnam sued the Waco newspaper, television station KWTX, and an ambulance company on behalf of Special Agent John Risenhoover and the families of deceased ATF agents for their wrongful deaths arising out of the media's role in tipping off David Koresh to the raid on the Branch Davidian compound outside of Waco. The case was reportedly settled for $15 million, after Dunnam and counsel for other injured and deceased agents successfully argued that despite the First Amendment press protections, "if you're going to write a story, you cannot run a stop sign to get a story."

Dunnam again successful argued for the novel application of the law in a case involving the shooting of Waco Police Officer Bill Biles by a minor who had obtained a handgun through a stray sale at a local pawnshop. After a successful ruling allowing the case to proceed to a jury, Biles was paid $1.5 million

In 2016, Dunnam, together with his former law school classmate Rob Ammons, secured a $27.5 million settlement for a brain-injured infant, his mother, and his brother arising out of a rear-end collision. The settlement is one of the largest of its kind ever reported in Texas.

Notably, both the ATF and Biles lawsuits, along with another of Dunnam's cases involving a successful jury trial related to crop-dusting overspray, are all used as part of the curriculum in the nationally recognized Practice Court classes at Baylor Law School. Dunnam is currently the lead lawyer in the nationally recognized Title IX litigation involving 15 female students who were sexually assaulted while at Baylor University.

Dunnam is a board-certified specialist in civil trial law and family law by the Texas Board of Legal Specialization. He holds an AV Preeminent rating from Martindale-Hubbell. In 2001, Dunnam was named the Baylor Young Lawyer of the Year.

Preceded by Barbara Rusling	Member of the Texas House of Representatives from District 57 (Waco)^{^{(1)}} 1997-2011	Succeeded by Marva Beck
Notes and references
1. For the 76th and 77th Legislatures Dunnam's home city was McGregor
