= Marva Beck =

American politician

Member of the Texas House of Representatives from the 57th district
- In office January 11, 2011 – January 8, 2013
- Preceded by: Jim Dunnam
- Succeeded by: Trent Ashby

Personal details
- Born: Marva Black; November 21, 1944 (age 81) Centerville, Texas, U.S.
- Party: Republican
- Spouse: Melvin S. Beck II (m. 1970; died 2004)
- Children: 3

Marva Black Beck (born November 21, 1944) was a Republican member of the Texas House of Representatives for District 57.

== Personal life ==
Marva Black was born on November 21, 1944, in Centerville, Texas. Beck grew up in Houston's 5th Ward, she graduated from San Jacinto High School She married Melvin S. Beck II on December 4, 1970, in Harris County, Texas, they had 3 sons James, Rick, and Trey. Beck attends First Methodist Church of Centerville and is the church treasurer. Becks son Rick died in a boating accident and her son James died in a motor vehicle accident. Becks husband Melvin died of cancer on March 13, 2004, six months after the death of her son James. Trey works in the construction industry in Houston, Texas.

== Political career ==
Beck represented District 57 in the Texas House of Representatives during the 82nd legislature. While in the state house she served on the Homeland Security and Public Safety Committee and the Natural Resources Committee. She also served as chairman of the Lee County Republican Party.

== Elections ==
=== 2012 ===
Beck went up against challenger Trent Ashby in the Republican primary. Ashby raised over 300,000 dollars most from in district donors, Beck raised ~180,000. Beck claimed that Ashby raised taxes on the Lufkin ISD School Board to increase the salary of the superintendent. Ashby and other Lufkin ISD trustees claimed this was false.

Texas House of Representatives District 57 Republican Primary, 2012
Party	Candidate	Votes	%
Republican	Trent Ashby	11,730	58.1%
Republican	Marva Black Beck	8,454	41.9%

Beck
- Gov. Rick Perry (R)
- Greg Abbott (R)
- Todd Staples (R)
- Texans for Lawsuit Reform
- Bob Perry

=== 2010 ===
Texas House of Representatives District 57, 2010
Party	Candidate	Votes	%
Republican	Marva Black Beck	14,391	51.68%
Democratic	Jim Dunnam	12,743	45.76%
Libertarian	Derek Johnson	712	2.55%

Beck unseated 12 year Democratic incumbent Jim Dunnam.
