= Allen Place =

American biologist and biochemist

Allen R. Place
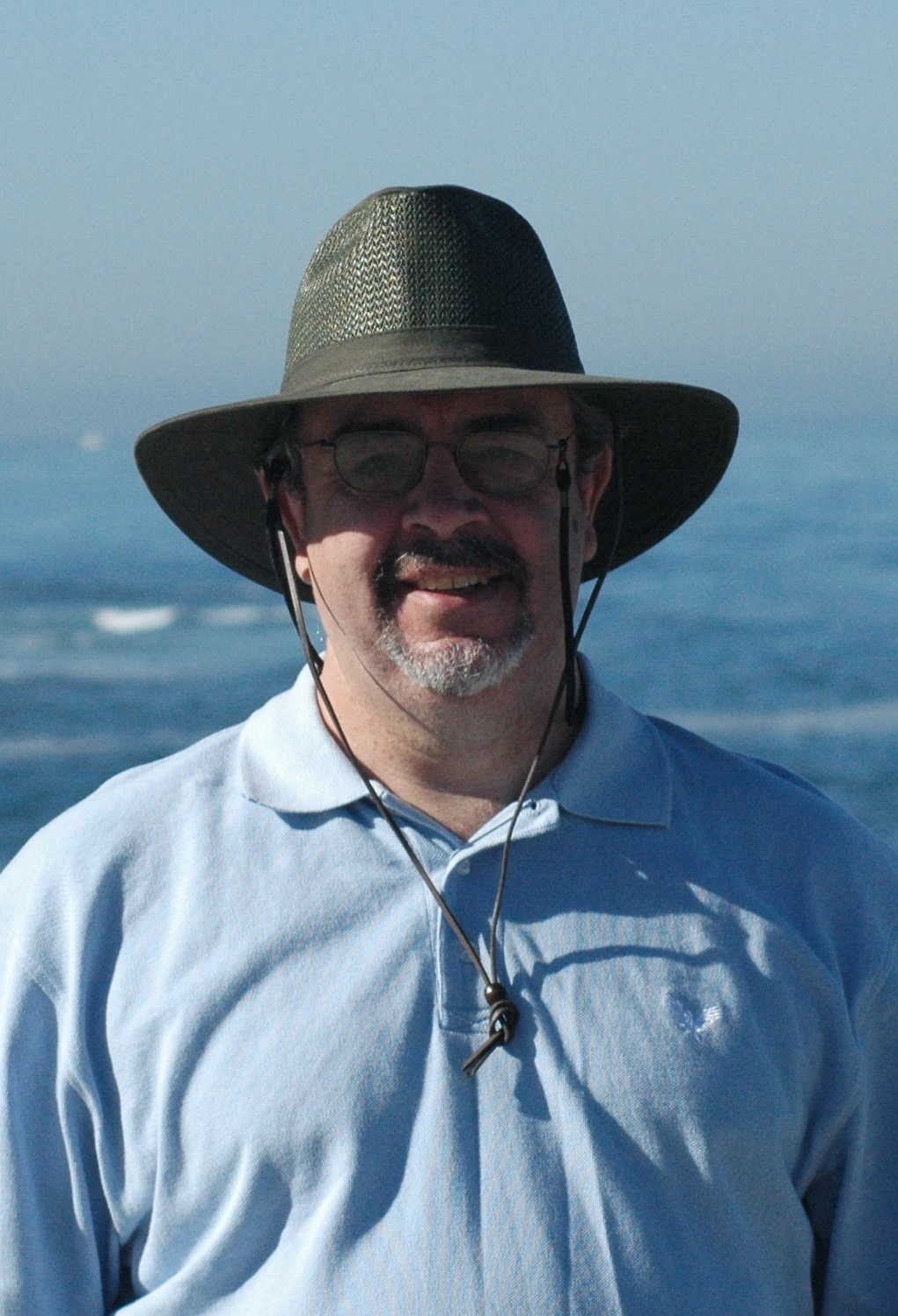
- Occupations: Biologist, biochemist and academic

Academic background
- Education: Johns Hopkins University

Allen R. Place is an American biologist, biochemist, and academic. He is a Director at the BioAnalytical Research Laboratory and the Harmful Algal Bloom Control Technology Incubator within the Institute of Marine and Environmental Technology (IMET), and an associate director for Research and Professor at University of Maryland Center for Environmental Science (UMCES).

Place is most known for his research on the fundamental structures and functions of living systems, addressing three key research areas: fine-tuning enzyme function to adapt to the environment, investigating biochemical adaptations for utilizing unique food sources, and elucidating mechanisms governing sex determination. He has authored journal papers and book chapters, and co-authored software, including "The Protein Sequencing Apprentice" (1986). He is the recipient of the UMBI Regent's Award for Public Service and the UMCES President's Award for Excellence in Application of Science.

Place is a Fellow at the National Research Council and has served as a Guest Editor for two special issues namely, "Advances and New Perspectives in Marine Biotechnology II 2016" published in Marine Drugs and "New Insights into Fish Physiology-Applications Focus: Challenges and Mitigations II" featured in the Journal of Marine Science and Engineering. He served as a Conference Organizer at the 9th US Symposium on Harmful Algae held in Baltimore in November 2017.

== Education ==
Place earned his Bachelor of Arts degree in Earth and Planetary Sciences with an NIH Predoctoral Fellowship from The Johns Hopkins University in 1973. Subsequently, he pursued a Ph.D. in Biochemistry completing his graduate studies in 1979, and conducted his postdoctoral studies in 1980 at the same institution.

== Career ==
Place started his academic career as an assistant professor of Biology at the University of Pennsylvania, a position he held from 1980 to 1987. Moving to the Center of Marine Biotechnology at the University of Maryland Biotechnology Institute (UMBI), he became an associate professor in 1987, and a Professor from 2001 to 2010.

Serving since 2001 as the Director of the BioAnalytical Research Laboratory within IMET, Place has also held the role of Director for the Harmful Algal Bloom Control Technology Incubator (HAB-CTI) since 2022, and concurrently maintains the position of associate director for Research at the University of Maryland Center for Environmental Science (UMCES) since 2023.

== Research ==
Place's research has been centered on elucidating molecular mechanisms, unique diets, environments, interactions, and the molecular basis of sex determination.

=== Biochemical adaptations to the environment ===
Place has conducted research on the functional significance of allelic variation and geographical differences in gene frequencies. Under the guidance of Dennis Powers during his doctoral research, he delved into exploring the functional significance of allelic variation in lactate dehydrogenases from Fundulus heteroclitus, a common nearshore minnow along the eastern seaboard of the United States. Building on this foundation during a brief postdoctoral position with Bill Sofer, his investigations were extended to alcohol dehydrogenase variants in Drosophila. He scrutinized the kinetic properties of pyruvate reduction for different allozymes, revealing significant differences in reaction velocities at low pyruvate concentrations uncovering geographical variations in Ldh-B gene frequencies observed in F. heteroclitus.

=== Aquaculture sustainability ===
Place's work on developing and implementing a land-based, marine recirculating aquaculture system addressed environmental concerns associated with traditional fish farming practices and highlighted the vulnerabilities of current aquaculture operations to pollution as well as diseases. He has identified potential substitutes for traditional ingredients emphasizing strategies for enhancing the sustainability of aquaculture practices. In his early work, he investigated the biochemical processes governing the digestion of distinctive food sources, such as wax esters, leading to the establishment of a new research area. He also examined the efficacy of Crypthecodinium sp. phospholipid extract and meal in enriching rotifers, comparing their effectiveness with heterotrophically grown algae and fungal biomass. This study underscored the potential of single-cell heterotrophs as substitutes for fish-based ingredients in aquaculture diets. Collaborating with his student Aaron Watson, he researched the substitution of fishmeal with a plant-based diet to enhance sustainability in aquaculture, emphasizing that a 1.5% inclusion of taurine in the diet facilitates the complete replacement of fishmeal.

=== Developmental and reproductive physiology ===
Place's research in developmental and reproductive physiology has uncovered the roles of enzymes in digestion, defense, and sexual differentiation. His research on characterizing a second mammalian chitinase enzyme called AMCase, illuminated its potential roles in digestion and/or defense within the gastrointestinal tract and lung, contributing to the understanding of chitinase function in mammalian physiology.

In 2001, Place delved into the developmental expression of CYP19 genes (aromatase) in zebrafish, crucial for androgen-to-estrogen conversion. His findings revealed differential ontogeny between CYP19a and CYP19b, hinting at the potential role of CYP19b in sexual differentiation, influenced by pharmacological steroids. Collaborating with Yukinori Kazeto and John M Trant, he further investigated the impact of endocrine-disrupting chemicals (EDC) on the reproductive physiology of zebrafish juveniles. The study suggested differential transcriptional modulation of CYP19 genes, indicating potential disruptions in developmental and reproductive physiology, particularly in neural tissue.

=== Dinoflagellate toxicity ===
With a focus on growing dinoflagellate cultures, Place has investigated the toxicity of Karlodinium veneficum, shedding light on its role in fish kills along the Atlantic coast. The work successfully traced the toxic activity to two distinct fractions (Tox A and Tox B), providing insights into managing K. micrum blooms and mitigating associated fish mortality. Following the 1997 fish kills and public concern over Pfiesteria, he initiated research on the algae species in the Chesapeake Bay and its rivers retrieving Karlodinium veneficum for comparison with Pfiesteria, which showed higher toxicity, leading him to suspect Karlodinium as the primary cause of the Pfiesteriahysteria of 1997. Over the past two decades, his research at the Institute of Marine and Environmental Technology has focused on examining this microscopic algal cell, linking Karlodinium blooms to fish kills along the Atlantic coast. Collaborating with Mark Hamann at the University of Mississippi, they determined the complete absolute structure of one of the karlotoxins, despite its molecular complexity. He contributed to producing a full-length cDNA library for a dinoflagellate species, and his team obtained the complete transcriptome of several dinoflagellates, providing sequence information for rare transcripts used for heterologous mammalian expression validation.

== Awards and honors ==
- 2009 – Regent's Award Winner for Public Service, University of Maryland Biotechnology Institute (UMBI)
- 2012 – President's Award for Excellence in Application of Science, University of Maryland Center for Environmental Science (UMCES)
- 2022 – Appointed Associate Director of Research, University of Maryland Institute of Marine and Environmental Technology (IMET)

== Selected articles ==
- Boot, R. G., Blommaart, E. F., Swart, E., Ghauharali-van der Vlugt, K., Bijl, N., Moe, C., ... & Aerts, J. M. (2001). Identification of a novel acidic mammalian chitinase distinct from chitotriosidase. Journal of biological chemistry, 276(9), 6770–6778.
- Trant, J. M., Gavasso, S., Ackers, J., Chung, B. C., & Place, A. R. (2001). Developmental expression of cytochrome P450 aromatase genes (CYP19a and CYP19b) in zebrafish fry (Danio rerio). Journal of Experimental Zoology, 290(5), 475–483.
- Deeds, J. R., Terlizzi, D. E., Adolf, J. E., Stoecker, D. K., & Place, A. R. (2002). Toxic activity from cultures of Karlodinium micrum (= Gyrodinium galatheanum)(Dinophyceae)—a dinoflagellate associated with fish mortalities in an estuarine aquaculture facility. Harmful Algae, 1(2), 169–189.
- Kazeto, Y., Place, A. R., & Trant, J. M. (2004). Effects of endocrine disrupting chemicals on the expression of CYP19 genes in zebrafish (Danio rerio) juveniles. Aquatic toxicology, 69(1), 25–34.
- Tal, Y., Schreier, H. J., Sowers, K. R., Stubblefield, J. D., Place, A. R., & Zohar, Y. (2009). Environmentally sustainable land-based marine aquaculture. Aquaculture, 286(1–2), 28–35.
- Peng, J., Place, A. R., Yoshida, W., Anklin, C., & Hamann, M. T. (2010). Structure and absolute configuration of karlotoxin-2, an ichthyotoxin from the marine dinoflagellate Karlodinium veneficum. Journal of the American Chemical Society, 132(10), 3277–3279.
- Jones, G. D., Williams, E. P., Place, A. R., Jagus, R., & Bachvaroff, T. R. (2015). The alveolate translation initiation factor 4E family reveals a custom toolkit for translational control in core dinoflagellates. BMC evolutionary biology, 15, 1–12.
- Rodriguez, J. D., Haq, S., Bachvaroff, T., Nowak, K. F., Nowak, S. J., Morgan, D., ... & Smith, S. M. (2017). Identification of a vacuolar proton channel that triggers the bioluminescent flash in dinoflagellates. PLoS One, 12(2), e0171594.
