= Texas's 9th House of Representatives district =

American legislative district

Texas's 9th State House of Representatives district
Representative
Trent Ashby; R–Lufkin
- Demographics: 64.5% White; 15.2% Black; 16.8% Hispanic; 1.1% Asian; 2.4% Other
- Population (2020) • Voting age: 199,902; 156,851

District 9 is a district in the Texas House of Representatives. It was created in the 3rd legislature (1849–1851).

The district has been represented by Republican Trent Ashby since January 10, 2023; previously, Ashby was the Representative for the former District 57 and began his tenure in the House on January 8, 2013.

As a result of redistricting after the 2020 Federal census, from the 2022 elections the district encompasses all of Angelina, Houston, Polk, San Augustine, Trinity, and Tyler Counties. Major cities in the district include Crockett, Groveton, Livingston, Lufkin, San Augustine, and Woodville. The majority of Sam Rayburn Reservoir is in the district, as is the notable unincorporated community of West Livingston, which is the location of the Texas Department of Criminal Justice Allan B. Polunsky Unit, home of Texas' male death row.
