= Hunter Pope Lane =

American politician and lawyer (1865–1940)

- Lane's portrait for the 34th Texas Legislature

Member of the Texas House of Representatives from the 52nd-03 district
- In office January 14, 1913 – January 9, 1917
- Preceded by: Emil Gieptner
- Succeeded by: Multi-member district

Personal details
- Born: August 21, 1865 Marshall, Texas, US
- Died: September 30, 1930 (aged 65)
- Party: Democratic
- Occupation: Politician, lawyer

Hunter Pope Lane (August 21, 1865 – September 30, 1940) was an American politician and lawyer. A Democrat, he was a member of the Texas House of Representatives from 1913 to 1917, representing the 52nd district.

== Early life and education ==
Lane was born on August 21, 1865, in Marshall, Texas, the fourth of ten children born to Iverson Wesley Lane and Martha Elizabeth (née Pope) Lane. By 1870, he moved to Freestone County, and by 1870, to Georgetown. He was nicknamed "Rebel" as a child. In 1877, he graduated from Southwestern University. He read law under Fisher & Ward, and in 1889, was admitted to the bar.

== Career ==
From 1889 to 1891, Lane practiced law in Archer County. After 1891, he practiced between Bonham and Ladonia. From 1894 to 1896, he was the justice of the peace of Fannin County. He was the assistant district attorney of Fannin County from 1898 to 1902, and city attorney of Ladonia from 1901, until his resignation in 1902. After resigning, he moved to Fort Worth.

In Fort Worth, Lane, alongside R. W. Smith and J. C. McKinney, founded the Hunter P. Lane & Company, a real estate firm. In 1908, he was a founding member of the Fort Worth Real Estate Association. He was an election clerk in 1908 and was elected judge of the city corporation court in 1909. He unsuccessfully ran in the October 1910 election for Fort Worth's city and fire commissioner role, losing to former assistant chief of police Jim Allen. In his campaign, he accused the police department of operating a political machine. In 1916, Lane unsuccessfully ran for judge of the civil court of Tarrant County, losing the primary to George E. Hosey.

Lane was a Democrat. He was a member of the Texas House of Representatives, from January 14, 1913, to January 9, 1917, representing the third seat of the 52nd district. While serving, he was chairman of the Committee on Municipal Corporations, and was a member of the Committees on Common Carriers; on Criminal Jurisprudence; on Insurance; on the Judiciary; on Public Health; on Revenue and Taxation; and on Senatorial Districts. In February 1930, he unsuccessfully ran in the House election, for the fourth seat of the 101st district. Ideologically, he was progressive, supporting the equal distribution of tax spending and opposed Prohibition.

== Personal life and death ==
On December 8, 1891, Lane married Elizabeth Green, with whom he had nine children. They divorced in 1924. On January 8, 1925, he married Sallie B. Brown, a leader of the Fort Worth chapter of the League of Women Voters. He was a member of the Freemasons; the Independent Order of Odd Fellows; the Knights of Pythias; and the Woodmen of the World. He died on September 30, 1940, aged 65, in Fort Worth, from a myocardial infraction, and was buried at Mount Olivet Cemetery, in Fort Worth.
