= Fort Worth and Rio Grande Railway =

American railway company

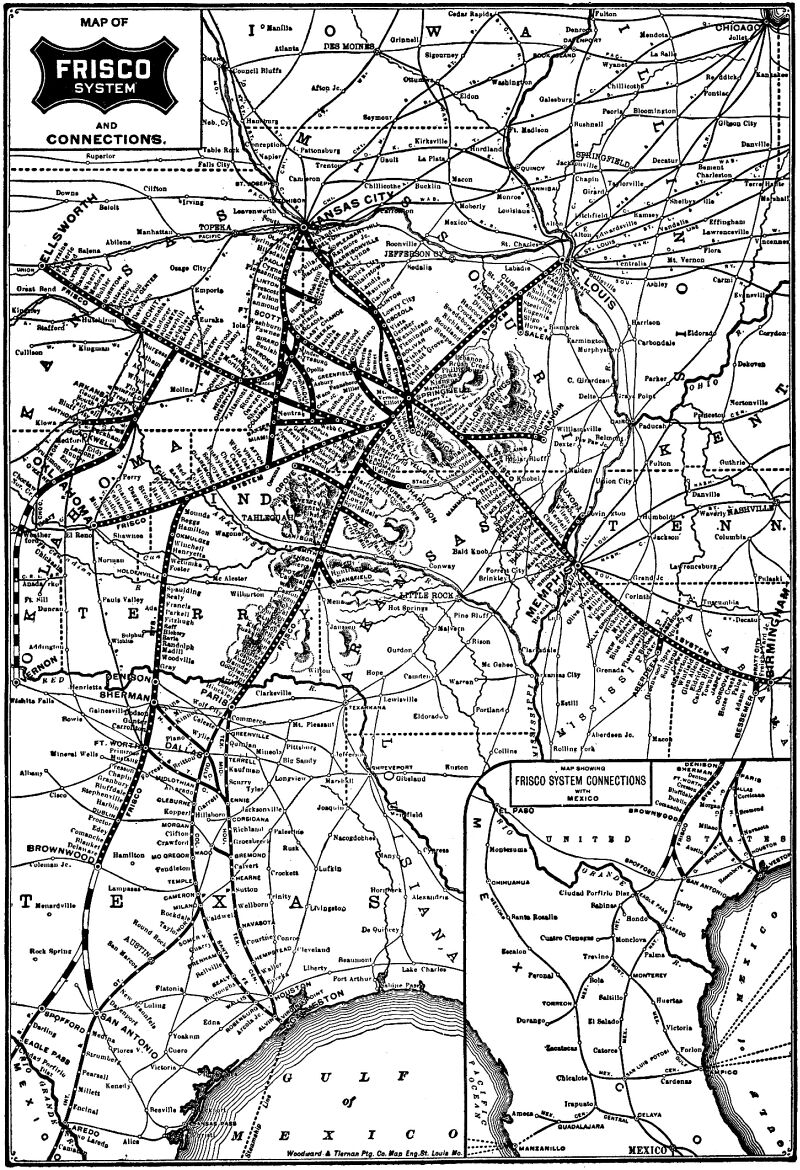
- Map of the Frisco system about 1901-1903, showing planned extensions of the newly acquired FW&RG from Brownwood to Spofford and San Antonio

Overview
- Headquarters: Fort Worth, Texas
- Locale: Texas
- Dates of operation: 1885–1948
- Successor: Gulf, Colorado and Santa Fe Railway

Technical
- Track gauge: 4 ft 8 1/2 in (1,435 mm) standard gauge

The Fort Worth and Rio Grande Railway, chartered under the laws of Texas on June 1, 1885, was part of a plan conceived by Buckley Burton Paddock and other Fort Worth civic leaders to create a transcontinental route linking New York, Fort Worth, and the Pacific port of Topolobampo, which they believed would stimulate the growth and development of southwest Texas in general, and the economy of Fort Worth in particular.

With financial backing from the Vanderbilt railroad syndicate, construction of the FW&RG began at Fort Worth in November, 1886, but proceeded slowly with many changes of route, reaching Granbury (40 miles [64 km] away) a year later, Comanche in 1890, and Brownwood, 144 miles (232 km) from Fort Worth, in 1891.

In 1901, the Frisco Railroad got control of the FW&RG, which it operated as an independent subsidiary, extending the line to Brady in 1903 and on to Menard in 1911. The Frisco entered bankruptcy in 1913 and made no further extensions of the FW&RG, which in most years failed to make a net profit.

On March 1, 1937, Frisco sold the FW&RG to the Atchison, Topeka and Santa Fe Railway for $1.5 million, giving the latter an entry into Fort Worth from the west. Santa Fe immediately leased the FW&RG to its Texas subsidiary, Gulf, Colorado and Santa Fe Railway, into which the FW&RG was merged on December 31, 1948. The FW&RG trackage was known as the Dublin Subdivision. On acquisition, Santa Fe improved the FW&RG track and began routing high volumes of freight over it, en route between the Dallas/Fort Worth area and California.

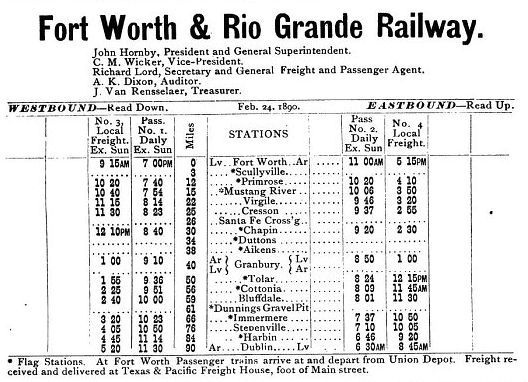
Timetable of the Fort Worth and Rio Grande Railway in 1890, when it terminated at Dublin.

The GC&SF was merged into corporate parent Atchison, Topeka and Santa Fe Railway on August 1, 1965. The Brownwood-Brady segment (44 miles [71 km]) had been abandoned in 1959, and the Brady-Menard segment (31 miles [50 km]) was abandoned in 1972. The remainder of the former FW&RG from Belt Junction in Fort Worth to Ricker, six miles (9.7 km) east of Brownwood, was bought by Cen-Tex Rail Link, an affiliate of the South Orient Railroad on May 20, 1994. South Orient sold the Cen-Tex line to the Fort Worth and Western Railroad in 1999.

== See also ==
For another ultimately unsuccessful attempt to create a transcontinental route to Topolobampo, see:

- Kansas City, Mexico and Orient Railway
