= Texas's 53rd House of Representatives district =

American legislative district

Texas's 53rd State House of Representatives district
Representative
Wesley Virdell; R–Junction
- Demographics: 57.9% White; 2.4% Black; 36.6% Hispanic; 1.2% Asian
- Population (2020) • Voting age: 199,548; 159,656

The 53rd district of the Texas House of Representatives contains the entirety of the following counties: Medina, Menard, Pecos, Real, Schleicher, Sutton, and Upton. The current representative is Wesley Virdell, who was first elected in 2024.
