= 2018 Texas Senate election =

- November 6, 2018

15 of the 31 seats in the Texas Senate 16 seats needed for a majority
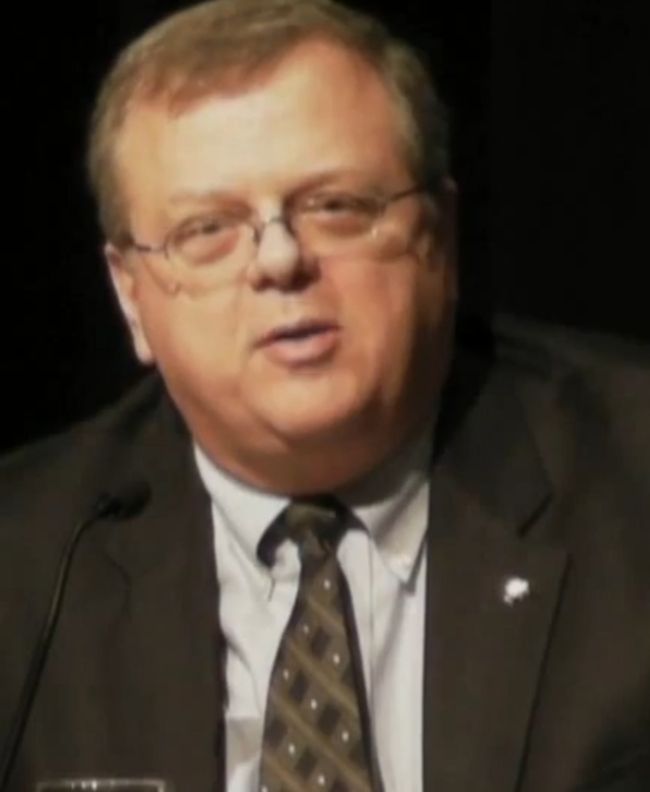

| | Majority party | Minority party |
|---|---|---|
| Leader | Paul Bettencourt | José R. Rodríguez |
| Party | Republican | Democratic |
| Leader since | January 26, 2016 | October 12, 2015 |
| Leader's seat | 7th–Houston | 29th–El Paso |
| Last election | 20 seats, 56.31% | 11 seats, 38.45% |
| Seats before | 21 | 10 |
| Seats won | 10 | 5 |
| Seats after | 19 | 12 |
| Seat change | ▼2 | ▲2 |
| Popular vote | 2,280,884 | 2,026,761 |
| Percentage | 52.14% | 46.33% |
- Republican hold Democratic hold Republican gain Democratic gain No election Republican: 50–60% 70–80% 80–90% Democratic: 50–60% 60–70% 70–80% >90%

The 2018 Texas Senate elections took place as part of the biennial United States elections. Texas voters elected state senators in 15 of the state senate's 31 districts. The winners of this election served in the 86th Texas Legislature. State senators serve four-year terms in the Texas State Senate. A statewide map of Texas's state Senate districts can be obtained from the Texas Legislative Council here, and individual district maps can be obtained from the U.S. Census here.

A primary election on March 6, 2018, determined which candidates appeared on the November 6 general election ballot. Primary election results can be obtained from the Texas Secretary of State's website.

Following the 2016 elections, Republicans maintained control of the Senate with 20 members. However, they gained an extra seat by flipping the 19th District in a September special election, giving them a 21-seat supermajority.

To claim control of the chamber from Republicans, the Democrats would have needed to net six Senate seats. The Democratic Party gained two seats, leaving the Republicans with a 19 to 12 majority in the chamber. Republicans maintained their supermajority, however, due to a 2015 rule change that reduced the effective vote threshold to pass legislation from 21 to 19.

== Predictions ==
| Source | Ranking | As of |
|---|---|---|
| Governing | Safe R | October 8, 2018 |

== Summary of race results ==
Summary of the November 6, 2018 Texas Senate election results
| Party | Candidates | Votes | | Seats | | | | |
| Party | Candidates | No. | % | Before | Up | Won | After | +/– |
|---|---|---|---|---|---|---|---|---|
| Republican | 14 | 2,280,884 | 52.14 | 21 | 12 | 10 | 19 | ▼2 |
| Democratic | 14 | 2,026,761 | 46.33 | 10 | 3 | 5 | 12 | ▲2 |
| Libertarian | 7 | 67,062 | 1.90 | 0 | 0 | 0 | 0 | Steady |
| Total | | 3,525,443 | 100.00 | 35 | 15 | 15 | 35 | Steady |

Popular vote
| Republican | 52.14% |
| Democratic | 46.33% |
| Libertarian | 1.90% |

Senate seats won
| Republican | 66.67% |
| Democratic | 33.33% |

== Retirements ==
One incumbent did not run for re-election in 2018:

=== Republican ===
1. District 8: Van Taylor ran for Texas's 3rd congressional district.

== Seats gained in preceding special elections ==
=== Republicans ===
1. District 19: Pete Flores defeated Pete Gallego in a preceding special election on September 18, 2018, to flip this seat. The seat was vacated by Carlos Uresti, who resigned after multiple convictions on fraud and laundering charges.

== Incumbents defeated ==
=== In the primary election ===
==== Republicans ====
1. District 30: Craig Estes lost to Pat Fallon.

=== In the general election ===
==== Republicans ====
1. District 10: Konni Burton lost to Beverly Powell.
2. District 16: Don Huffines lost to Nathan M. Johnson.

== Close races ==
| District | Winner | Margin |
|---|---|---|
| District 8 | Republican | 2.36% |
| District 10 | Democratic (flip) | 3.04% |
| District 17 | Republican | 4.64% |
| District 9 | Republican | 8.06% |
| District 16 | Democratic (flip) | 8.26% |

== Summary of results by senate district ==
Race results:

| District | Democratic | | Republican | | Libertarian | | Total | | Result |
| District | Votes | % | Votes | % | Votes | % | Votes | % | Result |
|---|---|---|---|---|---|---|---|---|---|
| District 2 | 104,897 | 40.65% | 153,151 | 59.35% | - | - | 258,048 | 100.00% | Republican hold |
| District 3 | 56,398 | 20.53% | 215,058 | 78.27% | 3,301 | 1.20% | 274,757 | 100.00% | Republican hold |
| District 5 | 136,792 | 41.47% | 182,550 | 55.34% | 10,500 | 3.18% | 329,842 | 100.00% | Republican hold |
| District 7 | 124,232 | 40.34% | 177,864 | 57.75% | 5,878 | 1.91% | 307,974 | 100.00% | Republican hold |
| District 8 | 162,157 | 48.82% | 169,995 | 51.18% | - | - | 332,152 | 100.00% | Republican hold |
| District 9 | 112,537 | 45.97% | 132,256 | 54.03% | - | - | 244,793 | 100.00% | Republican hold |
| District 10 | 148,959 | 51.73% | 138,968 | 48.27% | - | - | 287,927 | 100.00% | D gain from R |
| District 14 | 276,052 | 71.93% | 96,834 | 25.23% | 10,889 | 2.84% | 383,775 | 100.00% | Democratic hold |
| District 15 | 153,016 | 65.18% | 75,518 | 32.17% | 6,229 | 2.65% | 234,763 | 100.00% | Democratic hold |
| District 16 | 159,228 | 54.13% | 134,933 | 45.87% | - | - | 294,161 | 100.00% | D gain from R |
| District 17 | 143,978 | 46.80% | 158,263 | 51.44% | 5,396 | 1.75% | 307,637 | 100.00% | Republican hold |
| District 23 | 192,148 | 100.00% | - | - | - | - | 192,148 | 100.00% | Democratic hold |
| District 25 | 173,698 | 42.32% | 236,753 | 57.68% | - | - | 410,451 | 100.00% | Republican hold |
| District 30 | 82,669 | 26.08% | 234,374 | 73.92% | - | - | 317,043 | 100.00% | Republican hold |
| District 31 | - | - | 174,367 | 87.52% | 24,869 | 12.48% | 199,236 | 100.00% | Republican hold |
| Total | 2,026,761 | 46.33% | 2,280,884 | 52.14% | 67,062 | 1.53% | 4,374,707 | 100.00% | |

For districts not displayed, re-election was not scheduled until 2020.

| Senate district | incumbent | Party | Elected senator | Party |
|---|---|---|---|---|
| 2nd | Bob Hall | Rep | Bob Hall | Rep |
| 3rd | Robert Nichols | Rep | Robert Nichols | Rep |
| 5th | Charles Schwertner | Rep | Charles Schwertner | Rep |
| 7th | Paul Bettencourt | Rep | Paul Bettencourt | Rep |
| 8th | Van Taylor | Rep | Angela Paxton | Rep |
| 9th | Kelly Hancock | Rep | Kelly Hancock | Rep |
| 10th | Konni Burton | Rep | Beverly Powell | Dem |
| 14th | Kirk Watson | Dem | Kirk Watson | Dem |
| 15th | John Whitmire | Dem | John Whitmire | Dem |
| 16th | Don Huffines | Rep | Nathan Johnson | Dem |
| 17th | Joan Huffman | Rep | Joan Huffman | Rep |
| 19th (special) | Vacant | Dem | Pete Flores | Rep |
| 23rd | Royce West | Dem | Royce West | Dem |
| 25th | Donna Campbell | Rep | Donna Campbell | Rep |
| 30th | Craig Estes | Rep | Pat Fallon | Rep |
| 31st | Kel Seliger | Rep | Kel Seliger | Rep |

== Detailed results by senate district ==
=== District 2 ===
Incumbent Republican Bob Hall ran for re-election. Hall, a member of the Tea Party movement, was challenged in the Republican primary by state representative Cindy Burkett, who ran as a moderate alternative to Hall. Hall narrowly defeated Burkett in the primary and went on to defeat Democrat Kendall Scudder in the general election by a wide margin.

Republican primary
| Party | Candidate | Votes | % |
|---|---|---|---|
| Republican | Bob Hall (incumbent) | 35,530 | 53.2 |
| Republican | Cindy Burkett | 31,216 | 46.8 |
| Total votes | | 66,746 | 100.0 |

Democratic primary
| Party | Candidate | Votes | % |
|---|---|---|---|
| Democratic | Kendall Scudder | 20,573 | 100.0 |
| Total votes | | 20,573 | 100.0 |

Texas's 2nd State Senate District general election, 2018
| Party | Candidate | Votes | % |
|---|---|---|---|
| Republican | Bob Hall (incumbent) | 153,151 | 59.35 |
| Democratic | Kendall Scudder | 104,897 | 40.65 |
| Total votes | | 258,048 | 100.0 |
| Republican hold | | | |

=== District 3 ===
Incumbent Republican Robert Nichols won re-election.

Democratic primary
| Party | Candidate | Votes | % |
|---|---|---|---|
| Democratic | Shirley Layton | 12,452 | 100.0 |
| Total votes | | 12,452 | 100.0 |

Republican primary
| Party | Candidate | Votes | % |
|---|---|---|---|
| Republican | Robert Nichols (incumbent) | 78,434 | 100.0 |
| Total votes | | 78,434 | 100.0 |

Texas's 3rd State Senate District general election, 2018
| Party | Candidate | Votes | % |
|---|---|---|---|
| Republican | Robert Nichols (incumbent) | 215,058 | 78.27 |
| Democratic | Shirley Layton | 56,398 | 20.53 |
| Libertarian | Bruce Quarles | 3,301 | 1.20 |
| Total votes | | 274,757 | 100.0 |
| Republican hold | | | |

=== District 5 ===
Incumbent Republican Charles Schwertner won re-election.

Republican primary
| Party | Candidate | Votes | % |
|---|---|---|---|
| Republican | Charles Schwertner (incumbent) | 50,254 | 75.1 |
| Republican | Harold Ramm | 16,648 | 24.9 |
| Total votes | | 66,902 | 100.0 |

Democratic primary
| Party | Candidate | Votes | % |
|---|---|---|---|
| Democratic | Meg Walsh | 22,605 | 71.1 |
| Democratic | Brian E. Cronin | 5,383 | 16.9 |
| Democratic | Glenn "Grumpy" Williams | 3,791 | 11.9 |
| Total votes | | 31,779 | 100.0 |

Texas's 5th State Senate District general election, 2018
| Party | Candidate | Votes | % |
|---|---|---|---|
| Republican | Charles Schwertner (incumbent) | 182,550 | 55.34 |
| Democratic | Meg Walsh | 136,792 | 41.47 |
| Libertarian | Amy Lyons | 10,500 | 3.18 |
| Total votes | | 329,842 | 100.0 |
| Republican hold | | | |

=== District 7 ===
Incumbent Republican Paul Bettencourt won re-election.

Republican primary
| Party | Candidate | Votes | % |
|---|---|---|---|
| Republican | Paul Bettencourt (incumbent) | 44,950 | 100.0 |
| Total votes | | 44,950 | 100.0 |

Democratic primary
| Party | Candidate | Votes | % |
|---|---|---|---|
| Democratic | David Romero | 22,989 | 100.0 |
| Total votes | | 22,989 | 100.0 |

Texas's 7th State Senate District general election, 2018
| Party | Candidate | Votes | % |
|---|---|---|---|
| Republican | Paul Bettencourt (incumbent) | 177,864 | 57.75 |
| Democratic | David Romero | 124,232 | 40.34 |
| Libertarian | Tom Glass | 5,878 | 1.91 |
| Total votes | | 307,974 | 100.0 |
| Republican hold | | | |

=== District 8 ===
2018 Texas's 8th senate district election
- November 6, 2018
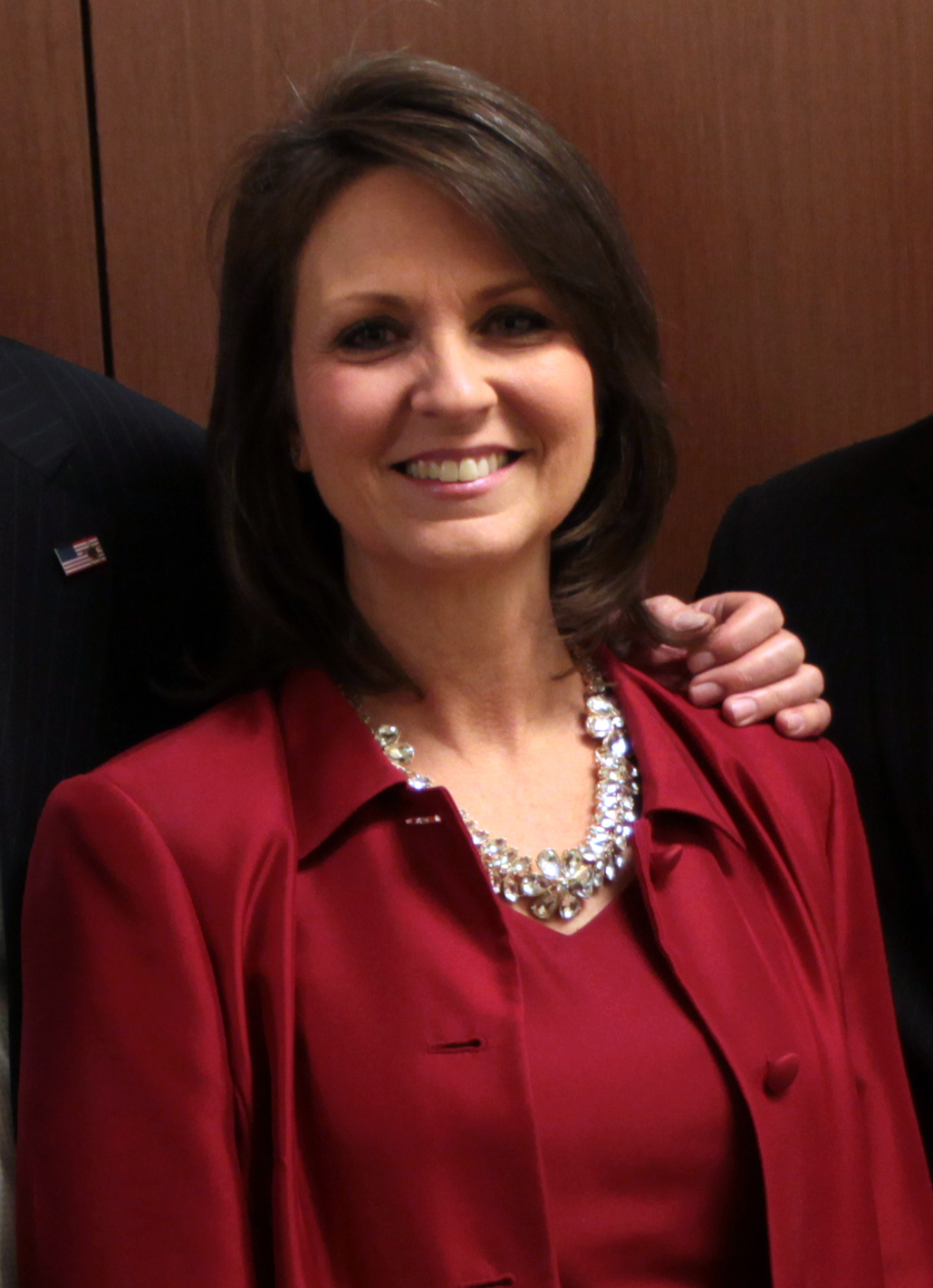

| Nominee | Angela Paxton | Mark Phariss |
| Party | Republican | Democratic |
| Popular vote | 169,995 | 162,157 |
| Percentage | 51.18% | 48.82% |
- Precinct results Paxton: 50–60% 60–70% 70–80% 80–90% Phariss: 50–60% 60–70% 70–80% 80–90% >90%
Texas Senator before election
Van Taylor
Republican Party
Elected Texas Senator
Angela Paxton
Republican Party

Incumbent Republican Van Taylor retired to run for Texas's 3rd congressional district, which was being vacated by incumbent Republican Sam Johnson. Prior to Taylor's retirement announcement, businessman Phillip Huffines, the brother of senator Don Huffines, announced his bid for the seat on the assumption that Taylor would run for the House. Educator Angela Paxton, the wife of attorney general Ken Paxton, later joined the race. Both candidates ran highly negative campaigns, spending millions of dollars on advertisements on what would become the most expensive senate primary in state history. Paxton won the Republican primary while Mark Pharris, a plaintiff in the lawsuit to overturn Texas's ban on same-sex marriage, won the Democratic primary. Paxton won the general election in the heavily Republican Collin County district. This was the closest senate election in the state during the 2018 elections.

Republican primary
| Party | Candidate | Votes | % |
|---|---|---|---|
| Republican | Angela Paxton | 32,756 | 54.3 |
| Republican | Phillip Huffines | 27,545 | 45.7 |
| Total votes | | 60,301 | 100.0 |

Democratic primary
| Party | Candidate | Votes | % |
|---|---|---|---|
| Democratic | Mark Phariss | 16,748 | 50.9 |
| Democratic | Brian Chaput | 16,148 | 49.1 |
| Total votes | | 32,896 | 100.0 |

Texas's 8th State Senate District general election, 2018
| Party | Candidate | Votes | % |
|---|---|---|---|
| Republican | Angela Paxton | 169,995 | 51.18 |
| Democratic | Mark Phariss | 162,157 | 48.82 |
| Total votes | | 332,152 | 100.0 |
| Republican hold | | | |

=== District 9 ===
Incumbent Republican Kelly Hancock won re-election.

Democratic primary
| Party | Candidate | Votes | % |
|---|---|---|---|
| Democratic | Gwenn Burud | 21,382 | 100.0 |
| Total votes | | 21,382 | 100.0 |

Republican primary
| Party | Candidate | Votes | % |
|---|---|---|---|
| Republican | Kelly Hancock (incumbent) | 31,188 | 100.0 |
| Total votes | | 31,188 | 100.0 |

Texas's 9th State Senate District general election, 2018
| Party | Candidate | Votes | % |
|---|---|---|---|
| Republican | Kelly Hancock (incumbent) | 132,256 | 54.03 |
| Democratic | Gwenn Burud | 112,537 | 45.97 |
| Total votes | | 244,793 | 100.0 |
| Republican hold | | | |

=== District 10 ===
2018 Texas's 10th senate district election
- November 6, 2018
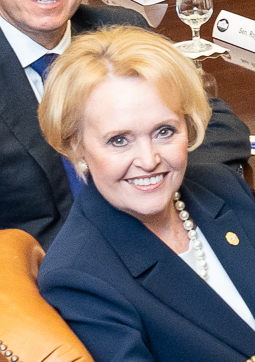

| Nominee | Beverly Powell | Konni Burton |
| Party | Democratic | Republican |
| Popular vote | 148,959 | 138,968 |
| Percentage | 51.73% | 48.27% |
- Precinct results Powell: 50–60% 60–70% 70–80% 80–90% >90% Burton: 50–60% 60–70% 70–80% 80–90% >90% Tie: 50% No vote
Texas Senator before election
Konni Burton
Republican Party
Elected Texas Senator
Beverly Powell
Democratic Party

Incumbent Republican Konni Burton ran for re-election. She was initially elected in 2014, flipping the seat after incumbent Democrat Wendy Davis retired to run for governor. Democrats Allison Campolo and Beverly Powell ran in the Democratic primary to challenge Burton, with Campolo running from the progressive wing of the Democratic party while Powell ran from the moderate wing of the party. Powell advanced to the general election, which saw large spending from conservative groups such as Empower Texans to defend Burton's seat. Powell narrowly defeated Burton in the general election, flipping the seat back to the Democrats.

Republican primary
| Party | Candidate | Votes | % |
|---|---|---|---|
| Republican | Konni Burton (incumbent) | 35,758 | 100.0 |
| Total votes | | 35,758 | 100.0 |

Democratic primary
| Party | Candidate | Votes | % |
|---|---|---|---|
| Democratic | Beverly Powell | 23,148 | 61.6 |
| Democratic | Allison Campolo | 14,432 | 38.4 |
| Total votes | | 37,580 | 100.0 |

Texas's 10th State Senate District general election, 2018
| Party | Candidate | Votes | % |
|---|---|---|---|
| Democratic | Beverly Powell | 148,959 | 51.73 |
| Republican | Konni Burton (incumbent) | 138,968 | 48.27 |
| Total votes | | 287,927 | 100.0 |
| Democratic gain from Republican | | | |

=== District 14 ===
Incumbent Democrat Kirk Watson won re-election.

Republican primary
| Party | Candidate | Votes | % |
|---|---|---|---|
| Republican | George W. Hindman | 24,168 | 100.0 |
| Total votes | | 24,168 | 100.0 |

Democratic primary
| Party | Candidate | Votes | % |
|---|---|---|---|
| Democratic | Kirk Watson (incumbent) | 82,626 | 100.0 |
| Total votes | | 82,626 | 100.0 |

Texas's 14th State Senate District general election, 2018
| Party | Candidate | Votes | % |
|---|---|---|---|
| Democratic | Kirk Watson (incumbent) | 276,052 | 71.93 |
| Republican | George Hindman | 96,834 | 25.23 |
| Libertarian | Micah Verlander | 10,889 | 2.84 |
| Total votes | | 383,775 | 100.0 |
| Democratic hold | | | |

=== District 15 ===
Incumbent Democrat John Whitmire won re-election.

Republican primary
| Party | Candidate | Votes | % |
|---|---|---|---|
| Republican | Randy Orr | 17,057 | 100.0 |
| Total votes | | 17,057 | 100.0 |

Democratic primary
| Party | Candidate | Votes | % |
|---|---|---|---|
| Democratic | John Whitmire (incumbent) | 27,307 | 74.9 |
| Democratic | Damian Lacroix | 6,520 | 17.9 |
| Democratic | Hank Segelke | 2,619 | 7.2 |
| Total votes | | 36,446 | 100.0 |

Texas's 15th State Senate District general election, 2018
| Party | Candidate | Votes | % |
|---|---|---|---|
| Democratic | John Whitmire (incumbent) | 153,016 | 65.18 |
| Republican | Randy Orr | 75,518 | 32.17 |
| Libertarian | Gilberto Velsquez, Jr. | 6,229 | 2.65 |
| Total votes | | 234,763 | 100.0 |
| Democratic hold | | | |

=== District 16 ===
2018 Texas's 16th senate district election
- November 6, 2018
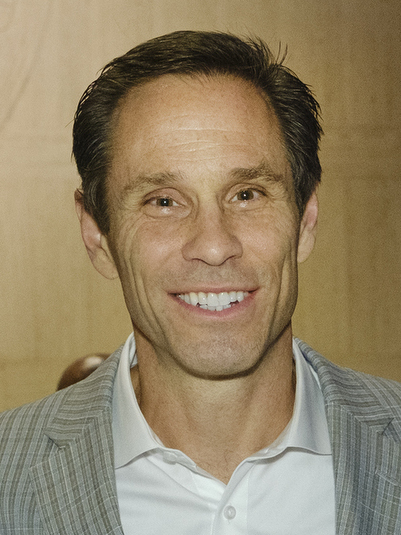

| Nominee | Nathan Johnson | Don Huffines |
| Party | Democratic | Republican |
| Popular vote | 159,228 | 134,933 |
| Percentage | 54.13% | 45.87% |
- Precinct results Johnson: 50–60% 60–70% 70–80% 80–90% >90% Huffines: 50–60% 60–70% 70–80% >90% Tie: 50% No vote
Texas Senator before election
Don Huffines
Republican Party
Elected Texas Senator
Nathan Johnson
Democratic Party

Incumbent Republican Don Huffines ran for re-election. Despite Republicans having held the 16th district for over 30 years, Huffines was seen as vulnerable due to the district's shifting demographics and Huffines' ultraconservative voting record. The district had voted for Hillary Clinton by 5 percentage points in 2016. Nathan Johnson, the Democratic nominee, defeated Huffines in the general election.

Republican primary
| Party | Candidate | Votes | % |
|---|---|---|---|
| Republican | Don Huffines (incumbent) | 30,311 | 100.0 |
| Total votes | | 30,311 | 100.0 |

Democratic primary
| Party | Candidate | Votes | % |
|---|---|---|---|
| Democratic | Nathan Johnson | 25,437 | 69.6 |
| Democratic | Joe Bogen | 11,125 | 30.4 |
| Total votes | | 36,562 | 100.0 |

Texas's 16th State Senate District general election, 2018
| Party | Candidate | Votes | % |
|---|---|---|---|
| Democratic | Nathan Johnson | 159,228 | 54.13 |
| Republican | Don Huffines (incumbent) | 134,933 | 45.87 |
| Total votes | | 294,161 | 100.0 |
| Democratic gain from Republican | | | |

=== District 17 ===
2018 Texas's 17th senate district election
- November 6, 2018
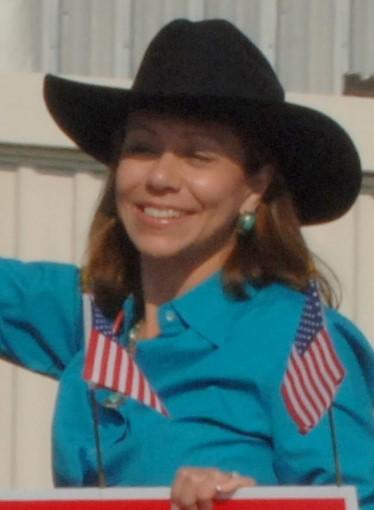

| Nominee | Joan Huffman | Rita Lucido |
| Party | Republican | Democratic |
| Popular vote | 158,263 | 143,978 |
| Percentage | 51.44% | 46.80% |
- Precinct results Huffman: 40–50% 50–60% 60–70% 70–80% 80–90% Lucido: 40–50% 50–60% 60–70% 70–80% 80–90% Tie: 40–50% 50% No vote
Texas Senator before election
Joan Huffman
Republican Party
Elected Texas Senator
Joan Huffman
Republican Party

Incumbent Republican Joan Huffman ran for re-election. Although she was considered potentially vulnerable due to Donald Trump's narrow victory in the district in 2016, she defeated Democrat Rita Lucido in the general election by 5 percentage points.

Republican primary
| Party | Candidate | Votes | % |
|---|---|---|---|
| Republican | Joan Huffman (incumbent) | 36,830 | 72.7 |
| Republican | Kristin Tassin | 13,849 | 27.3 |
| Total votes | | 50,679 | 100.0 |

Democratic primary
| Party | Candidate | Votes | % |
|---|---|---|---|
| Democratic | Rita Lucido | 17,669 | 49.0 |
| Democratic | Fran Watson | 12,663 | 35.1 |
| Democratic | Ahmad R. Hassan | 5,757 | 15.9 |
| Total votes | | 36,089 | 100.0 |

Democratic primary
| Party | Candidate | Votes | % |
|---|---|---|---|
| Democratic | Rita Lucido | 10,533 | 57.8 |
| Democratic | Fran Watson | 7,694 | 42.2 |
| Total votes | | 18,227 | 100.0 |

Texas's 17th State Senate District general election, 2018
| Party | Candidate | Votes | % |
|---|---|---|---|
| Republican | Joan Huffman (incumbent) | 158,263 | 51.44 |
| Democratic | Rita Lucido | 143,978 | 46.80 |
| Libertarian | Lauren LaCount | 5,396 | 1.75 |
| Total votes | | 307,637 | 100.0 |
| Republican hold | | | |

=== District 19 (special) ===
2018 Texas's 19th senate district special election
- September 18, 2018
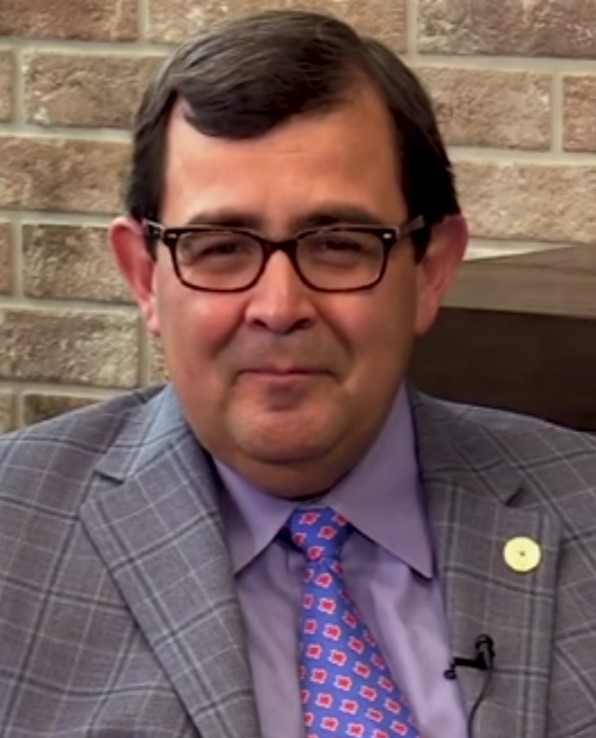

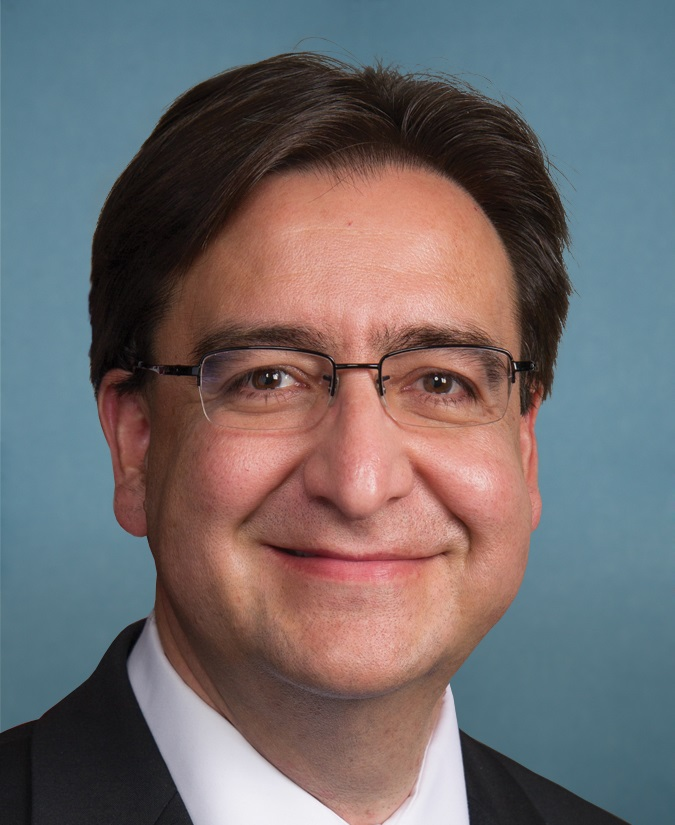
| Nominee | Pete Flores | Pete Gallego |
| Party | Republican | Democratic |
| Popular vote | 25,330 | 19,367 |
| Percentage | 56.67% | 43.33% |
- County results Flores: 50–60% 60–70% 70–80% 80–90% Gallego: 50–60% 60–70% 70–80% 80–90%
Texas Senator before election
vacant
Democratic Party
Elected Texas Senator
Pete Flores
Republican Party

Incumbent Democrat Carlos Uresti resigned after multiple convictions on fraud and laundering charges. Former U.S. Representative Pete Gallego and Texas House representative Roland Gutierrez ran as Democrats against Republican Pete Flores in the special election. Flores placed first in the election, a boon to Republicans in the Democratic-leaning district, but he failed to win a majority of the vote, forcing him into a runoff with Gallego. Despite stirrings of an upcoming Democratic wave election, Flores defeated Gallego in the runoff on September 18, 2018, to flip this seat, giving Republicans a supermajority of 21 seats in the Senate.

Texas's 19th Senate District special election
| Party | Candidate | Votes | % |
|---|---|---|---|
| Republican | Pete Flores | 9,003 | 32.35 |
| Democratic | Pete Gallego | 7,580 | 28.38 |
| Democratic | Roland Gutierrez | 6,389 | 24.38 |
| Republican | Carlos Antonio Raymond | 920 | 3.51 |
| Democratic | Tomas Uresti | 799 | 3.05 |
| Democratic | Charlie Urbina Jones | 789 | 3.01 |
| Republican | Jesse (Jay) Alaniz | 461 | 1.76 |
| Libertarian | Tony Valdivia | 266 | 1.01 |
| Total votes | | 26,207 | 100.0 |

Texas's 19th Senate District special election runoff
| Party | Candidate | Votes | % |
|---|---|---|---|
| Republican | Pete Flores | 25,330 | 56.67 |
| Democratic | Pete Gallego | 19,367 | 43.33 |
| Total votes | | 44,697 | 100.0 |
| Republican gain from Democratic | | | |

=== District 23 ===
Incumbent Democrat Royce West won re-election unopposed.

Democratic primary
| Party | Candidate | Votes | % |
|---|---|---|---|
| Democratic | Royce West (incumbent) | 50,226 | 100.0 |
| Total votes | | 50,226 | 100.0 |

Texas's 23rd State Senate District general election, 2018
| Party | Candidate | Votes | % |
|---|---|---|---|
| Democratic | Royce West (incumbent) | 192,148 | 100.0 |
| Total votes | | 192,148 | 100.0 |
| Democratic hold | | | |

=== District 25 ===
Incumbent Republican Donna Campbell won re-election.

Republican primary
| Party | Candidate | Votes | % |
|---|---|---|---|
| Republican | Donna Campbell (incumbent) | 59,143 | 73.7 |
| Republican | Shannon K. McClendon | 21,055 | 26.3 |
| Total votes | | 80,198 | 100.0 |

Democratic primary
| Party | Candidate | Votes | % |
|---|---|---|---|
| Democratic | Steven Kling | 23,017 | 51.1 |
| Democratic | Jack Guerra | 22,064 | 48.9 |
| Total votes | | 45,081 | 100.0 |

Texas's 25th State Senate District general election, 2018
| Party | Candidate | Votes | % |
|---|---|---|---|
| Republican | Donna Campbell (incumbent) | 236,753 | 57.68 |
| Democratic | Steven Kling | 173,698 | 42.32 |
| Total votes | | 410,451 | 100.0 |
| Republican hold | | | |

=== District 30 ===
Incumbent Craig Estes, considered a centrist Republican, faced conservative state representative Pat Fallon in a primary race. As the primary election approached, both campaigns grew increasingly combinative, including spars over an ad by Estes' campaign featuring Fallon in a Catholic confessional. Polling on behalf of Fallon paid for by Lieutenant Governor Dan Patrick suggested that Patrick supported Fallon's primary challenge, although he made no official endorsement. Fallon defeated Estes in the primary by a wide margin and went on to win the general election by an even larger margin.

Republican primary
| Party | Candidate | Votes | % |
|---|---|---|---|
| Republican | Pat Fallon | 53,881 | 62.0 |
| Republican | Craig Estes (incumbent) | 19,641 | 22.6 |
| Republican | Craig Carter | 13,371 | 15.4 |
| Total votes | | 86,893 | 100.0 |

Democratic primary
| Party | Candidate | Votes | % |
|---|---|---|---|
| Democratic | Kevin Lopez | 15,760 | 100.0 |
| Total votes | | 15,760 | 100.0 |

Texas's 30th State Senate District general election, 2018
| Party | Candidate | Votes | % |
|---|---|---|---|
| Republican | Pat Fallon | 234,374 | 73.92 |
| Democratic | Kevin Lopez | 82,669 | 26.08 |
| Total votes | | 317,043 | 100.0 |
| Republican hold | | | |

=== District 31 ===
Incumbent Republican Kel Seliger ran for re-election. Seliger was considered vulnerable to a primary challenge due to his refusal to back many conservative bills during previous sessions. He narrowly won his primary in 2014, voted against a 20-week abortion ban, opposed school voucher legislation, and refused to endorse lieutenant governor Dan Patrick's re-election campaign. He drew two primary challengers, including Mike Canon, whom Seliger had narrowly defeated in 2014 and had the support of conservative groups such as Empower Texans. Seliger won the primary, narrowly avoiding a runoff. He faced nominal third-party opposition in the general election and easily won.

Republican primary
| Party | Candidate | Votes | % |
|---|---|---|---|
| Republican | Kel Seliger (incumbent) | 40,664 | 50.4 |
| Republican | Mike Canon | 25,335 | 31.4 |
| Republican | Victor Leal | 14,671 | 18.2 |
| Total votes | | 80,670 | 100.0 |

Texas's 31st State Senate District general election, 2018
| Party | Candidate | Votes | % |
|---|---|---|---|
| Republican | Kel Seliger (incumbent) | 174,367 | 87.52 |
| Libertarian | Jack Westbrook | 24,869 | 12.48 |
| Total votes | | 199,236 | 100.0 |
| Republican hold | | | |

== See also ==
- United States elections, 2018
- United States Senate election in Texas, 2018
- United States House of Representatives elections in Texas, 2018
- Texas gubernatorial election, 2018
- 2018 Texas House of Representatives election
- Texas elections, 2018
