= 1970 Texas Senate election =

- November 3, 1970

16 out of 31 seats in the Texas Senate 16 seats needed for a majority
	Majority party	Minority party
Party	Democratic	Republican
Last election	29	2
Seats won	16	0
Seats after	29	2
Seat change	Steady	Steady
Popular vote	690,897	130,451
Percentage	84.08%	15.87%
Swing	▲10.81%	▼10.86%
- Senate results by district Democratic hold No election
President pro tempore before election
Criss Cole
Democratic
Elected President pro tempore
Jack Hightower
Democratic

The 1970 Texas Senate election was held on November 3, 1970, to determine which party would control the Texas Senate for the following two years in the 62nd Texas Legislature. Sixteen out of the 31 seats in the Texas Senate were up for election and the primary was held on May 2, 1970, with run-offs held on June 6. Prior to the election, 29 seats were held by Democrats and 2 seats were held by Republicans. The general election saw Democrats maintain their majority in the State Senate.

== Retirements ==
=== Democrats ===
1. District 2: Jack Strong retired.
2. District 6: Criss Cole retired.
3. District 19: Red Berry retired.
4. District 31: Grady Hazlewood retired.

== Results ==
=== District 2 ===
District 2 election
Party	Candidate	Votes	%
Democratic	Lindley Beckworth	41,727	62.51%
Republican	Jack Warren	24,633	36.90%
	Scattering	393	0.59%
Total votes		66,753	100.0%
Democratic hold			

=== District 4 ===
District 4 election
Party	Candidate	Votes	%
Democratic	D. Roy Harrington (incumbent)	44,346	100.0%
Total votes		44,346	100.0%
Democratic hold			

=== District 6 ===
District 6 election
Party	Candidate	Votes	%
Democratic	James P. Wallace	42,526	67.79%
Republican	Abe Farrior	20,204	32.21%
Total votes		62,730	100.0%
Democratic hold			

=== District 7 ===
District 7 election
Party	Candidate	Votes	%
Democratic	Chet Brooks (incumbent)	31,202	100.0%
Total votes		31,202	100.0%
Democratic hold			

=== District 10 ===
District 10 election
Party	Candidate	Votes	%
Democratic	Don Kennard (incumbent)	–	100.0%
Total votes		–	100.0%
Democratic hold			

=== District 12 ===
District 12 election
Party	Candidate	Votes	%
Democratic	J. P. Word (incumbent)	60,891	100.0%
Total votes		60,891	100.0%
Democratic hold			

=== District 13 ===
District 13 election
Party	Candidate	Votes	%
Democratic	Murray Watson Jr. (incumbent)	46,968	100.0%
Total votes		46,968	100.0%
Democratic hold			

=== District 19 ===
District 19 election
Party	Candidate	Votes	%
Democratic	Glenn Kothmann	34,119	56.08%
Republican	James R. Nowlin	26,721	43.92%
Total votes		60,840	100.0%
Democratic hold			

=== District 21 ===
District 21 election
Party	Candidate	Votes	%
Democratic	Wayne Connally (incumbent)	48,781	100.0%
Total votes		48,781	100.0%
Democratic hold			

=== District 22 ===
District 22 election
Party	Candidate	Votes	%
Democratic	Tom Creighton (incumbent)	63,135	100.0%
Total votes		63,135	100.0%
Democratic hold			

=== District 23 ===
District 23 election
Party	Candidate	Votes	%
Democratic	Oscar Mauzy (incumbent)	40,937	61.84%
Republican	Ray Zauber	25,256	38.16%
Total votes		66,193	100.0%
Democratic hold			

=== District 24 ===
District 24 election
Party	Candidate	Votes	%
Democratic	David Ratliff (incumbent)	47,174	100.0%
Total votes		47,174	100.0%
Democratic hold			

=== District 26 ===
District 26 election
Party	Candidate	Votes	%
Democratic	Joe J. Bernal (incumbent)	46,784	100.0%
Total votes		46,784	100.0%
Democratic hold			

=== District 28 ===
District 28 election
Party	Candidate	Votes	%
Democratic	H. J. Blanchard (incumbent)	50,315	100.0%
Total votes		50,315	100.0%
Democratic hold			

=== District 30 ===
District 30 election
Party	Candidate	Votes	%
Democratic	Jack Hightower (incumbent)	54,399	100.0%
Total votes		54,399	100.0%
Democratic hold			

=== District 31 ===
District 31 election
Party	Candidate	Votes	%
Democratic	Max Sherman	37,593	52.77%
Republican	Malouf Abraham	33,637	47.22%
	Scattering	5	0.01%
Total votes		71,235	100.0%
Democratic hold			
