= 2020 Texas Senate election =

- November 3, 2020

16 of the 31 seats in the Texas Senate 16 seats needed for a majority
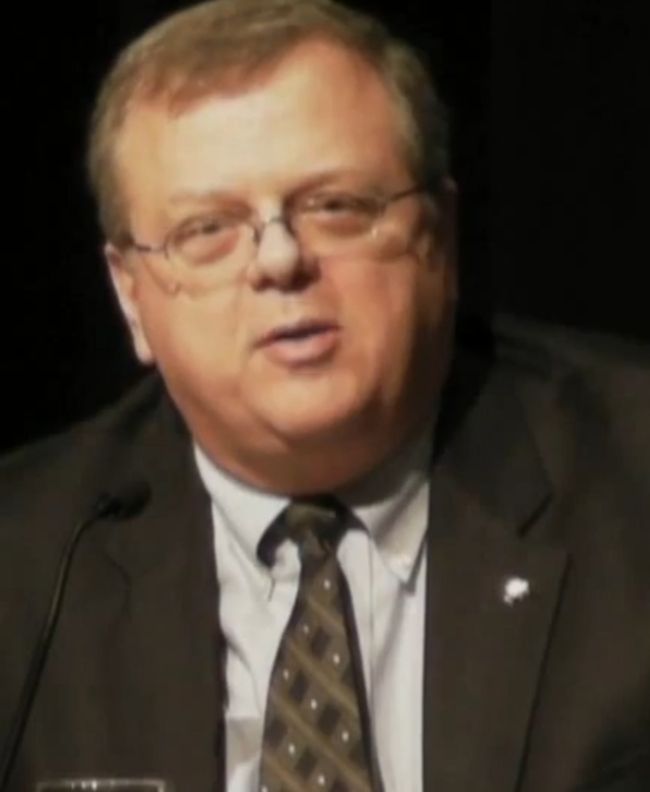

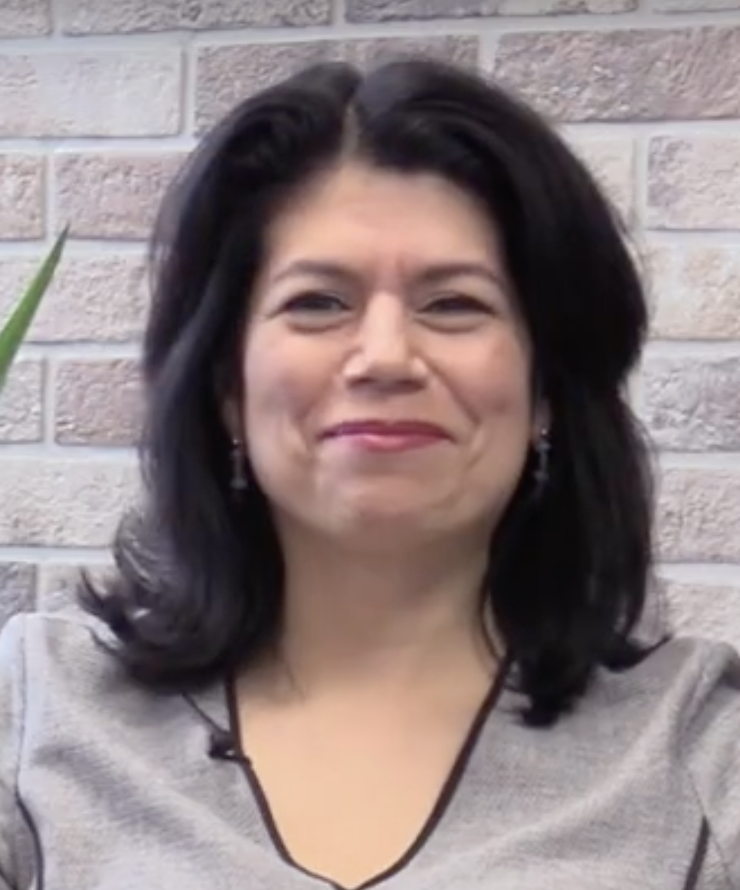
	Majority party	Minority party
Leader	Paul Bettencourt	Carol Alvarado
Party	Republican	Democratic
Leader since	January 26, 2016	January 8, 2020
Leader's seat	7th–Houston	6th–Houston
Last election	19 seats, 50.66%	12 seats, 47.82%
Seats before	19	12
Seats won	8	8
Seats after	18	13
Seat change	▼1	▲1
Popular vote	2,660,120	2,226,640
Percentage	53.28%	44.59%
- Republican hold Democratic hold Democratic gain Republican: 50–60% 60–70% 70–80% ≥90% Democratic: 40–50% 50–60% 60–70% 70–80% 80–90%

The 2020 Texas Senate elections took place as part of the biennial United States elections. Texas voters elected state senators in 16 of the 31 state senate districts. The winners of this election served in the 87th Texas Legislature. State senators serve four-year terms in the Texas State Senate. Those elected in 2020 will only be elected for two years, however, as part of the 2-4-4 term system. A statewide map of Texas's state Senate districts can be obtained from the Texas Legislative Council. and individual district maps can be obtained from the U.S. Census.

Following the 2018 state senate elections, Republicans maintained effective control of the Senate with 19 members. To claim control of the chamber from Republicans, the Democrats would have needed to net four Senate seats.

The Democratic Party gained one seat (District 19), leaving the Republicans with an 18 to 13 majority in the chamber. This broke Republican's effective supermajority in the chamber, as legislation typically requires 19 votes, three fifths, to pass the chamber. At the urging of lieutenant governor Dan Patrick, the senate voted to reduce this threshold to 18, just as he had done to reduce the threshold from 21 to 19 during the 2015 session.

== Retirements ==
One incumbent did not run for re-election in 2020:

=== Democrats ===
1. District 29: José R. Rodríguez: Retiring

== Incumbents defeated ==
=== In the general election ===
==== Republicans ====
1. District 19: Pete Flores lost to Roland Gutierrez.

== Predictions ==
Despite the state's competitive elections for President and House of Representatives, analysts considered the Texas Senate extremely unlikely to flip control due to the small number of competitive seats up for election in 2020.

Source	Ranking	As of
The Cook Political Report	Likely R	October 21, 2020
Sabato's Crystal Ball	Safe R	May 7, 2020

== Results summary ==
Summary of the November 3, 2020 Texas Senate election results
Party	Candidates	Votes		Seats				
Party	Candidates	No.	%	Before	Up	Won	After	+/–
Republican	14	2,660,120	53.28	19	9	8	18	▼1
Democratic	15	2,226,640	44.59	12	7	8	13	▲1
Libertarian	4	57,147	1.14	0	0	0	0	Steady
Green	1	49,202	0.99	0	0	0	0	Steady
Total		4,993,109	100.00	31	16	16	31	Steady
Source: Texas Elections Results

Popular vote
Republican	53.28%
Democratic	44.59%
Other	2.13%

Senate seats won
Republican	50.00%
Democratic	50.00%

== Close races ==
District	Winner	Margin
District 19	Democratic (flip)	3.29%

== Summary of results by State Senate District ==
State Senate District	Incumbent	Party	Elected Senator	Party
1st	Bryan Hughes	Rep	Bryan Hughes	Rep
4th	Brandon Creighton	Rep	Brandon Creighton	Rep
6th	Carol Alvarado	Dem	Carol Alvarado	Dem
11th	Larry Taylor	Rep	Larry Taylor	Rep
12th	Jane Nelson	Rep	Jane Nelson	Rep
13th	Borris Miles	Dem	Borris Miles	Dem
18th	Lois Kolkhorst	Rep	Lois Kolkhorst	Rep
19th	Pete Flores	Rep	Roland Gutierrez	Dem
20th	Juan Hinojosa	Dem	Juan Hinojosa	Dem
21st	Judith Zaffirini	Dem	Judith Zaffirini	Dem
22nd	Brian Birdwell	Rep	Brian Birdwell	Rep
24th	Dawn Buckingham	Rep	Dawn Buckingham	Rep
26th	Jose Menendez	Dem	Jose Menendez	Dem
27th	Eddie Lucio Jr.	Dem	Eddie Lucio Jr.	Dem
28th	Charles Perry	Rep	Charles Perry	Rep
29th	José R. Rodríguez	Dem	Cesar Blanco	Dem

District	Democratic		Republican		Others		Total		Result
District	Votes	%	Votes	%	Votes	%	Votes	%	Result
District 1	87,885	24.74%	267,404	75.26%	-	-	355,289	100.00%	Republican hold
District 4	113,050	30.19%	281,105	67.35%	10,277	2.46%	417,401	100.00%	Republican hold
District 6	137,895	84.05%	-	-	26,166	15.95%	164,061	100.00%	Democratic hold
District 11	148,225	38.10%	231,268	59.45%	9,519	2.45%	389,012	100.00%	Republican hold
District 12	177,610	37.71%	293,399	62.29%	-	-	471,009	100.00%	Republican hold
District 13	200,195	80.47%	48,581	19.53%	-	-	248,776	100.00%	Democratic hold
District 18	144,489	34.21%	277,872	65.79%	-	-	422,289	100.00%	Republican hold
District 19	158,726	49.85%	148,213	46.55%	11,465	3.60%	318,404	100.00%	Democratic gain
District 20	154,311	58.48%	109,563	41.52%	-	-	263,874	100.00%	Democratic hold
District 21	167,672	60.14%	111,142	39.86%	-	-	278,814	100.00%	Democratic hold
District 22	118,538	31.55%	257,208	68.45%	-	-	375,746	100.00%	Republican hold
District 24	115,853	30.46%	264,517	69.54%	-	-	380,370	100.00%	Republican hold
District 26	199,829	79.99%	-	-	50,004	20.01%	249,833	100.00%	Democratic hold
District 27	134,035	64.81%	72,768	35.19%	-	-	206,803	100.00%	Democratic hold
District 28	-	-	248,025	100.00%	-	-	248,025	100.00%	Republican hold
District 29	176,360	67.32%	85,619	32.68%	-	-	261,979	100.00%	Democratic hold
Total	2,234,673	44.24%	2,696,684	53.38%	107,431	2.13%	5,051,685	100.00%	Source:

== Detailed results by State Senate District ==
=== District 1 ===
==== Republican primary ====
Republican primary
Party	Candidate	Votes	%
Republican	Bryan Hughes (incumbent)	99,356	100.0%
Total votes		99,356	100.0%

==== Democratic primary ====
Democratic primary
Party	Candidate	Votes	%
Democratic	Audrey Spanko	29,162	100.0%
Total votes		29,162	100.0%

==== General election ====
Texas's 1st State Senate District General Election, 2020
Party	Candidate	Votes	%
Republican	Bryan Hughes (incumbent)	267,404	75.26%
Democratic	Audrey Spanko	87,885	24.74%
Total votes		355,289	100.00
Republican hold			

=== District 4 ===
==== Republican primary ====
Republican primary
Party	Candidate	Votes	%
Republican	Brandon Creighton (incumbent)	76,775	100.0%
Total votes		76,775	100.0%

==== Democratic primary ====
Democratic primary
Party	Candidate	Votes	%
Democratic	Jay Stittleburg	37,848	100.0%
Total votes		37,848	100.0%

==== General election ====
Texas's 4th State Senate District General Election, 2020
Party	Candidate	Votes	%
Republican	Brandon Creighton (incumbent)	281,105	67.35%
Democratic	Jay Stittleburg	126,019	30.19%
Libertarian	Cameron Brock	10,277	2.46%
Total votes		417,401	100.00%
Republican hold			

=== District 6 ===
==== Democratic primary ====
Democratic primary
Party	Candidate	Votes	%
Democratic	Carol Alvarado (incumbent)	31,938	100.0%
Total votes		31,938	100.0%

==== General election ====
Texas's 6th State Senate District General Election, 2020
Party	Candidate	Votes	%
Democratic	Carol Alvarado (incumbent)	137,895	84.05%
Libertarian	Timothy Duffield	26,166	15.95%
Total votes		164,061	100.00%
Democratic hold			

=== District 11 ===
==== Republican primary ====
Republican primary
Party	Candidate	Votes	%
Republican	Larry Taylor (incumbent)	63,378	100.0%
Total votes		63,378	100.0%

==== Democratic primary ====
Democratic primary
Party	Candidate	Votes	%
Democratic	Susan Criss	26,155	53.0%
Democratic	Margarita Ruiz Johnson	23,188	47.0%
Total votes		49,343	100.0%

==== General election ====
Texas's 11th State Senate District General Election, 2020
Party	Candidate	Votes	%
Republican	Larry Taylor (incumbent)	231,268	59.45%
Democratic	Susan Criss	148,225	38.10%
Libertarian	Jared Wissel	9,519	2.45%
Total votes		389,012	100.00%
Republican hold			

=== District 12 ===
==== Republican primary ====
Republican primary
Party	Candidate	Votes	%
Republican	Jane Nelson (incumbent)	63,061	100.0%
Total votes		63,061	100.0%

==== Democratic primary ====
Democratic primary
Party	Candidate	Votes	%
Democratic	Shadi Zitoon	32,831	57.5%
Democratic	Randy Daniels	24,291	42.5%
Total votes		57,122	100.0%

==== General election ====
Texas's 12th State Senate District General Election, 2020
Party	Candidate	Votes	%
Republican	Jane Nelson (incumbent)	293,399	62.29%
Democratic	Shadi Zitoon	177,610	37.71%
Total votes		471,009	100.00%
Republican hold			

=== District 13 ===
==== Democratic primary ====
Democratic primary
Party	Candidate	Votes	%
Democratic	Borris Miles (incumbent)	36,514	55.4%
Democratic	Melissa Morris	22,840	34.7%
Democratic	Richard Andrews	6,525	9.9%
Total votes		65,879	100.0%

==== Republican primary ====
Republican primary
Party	Candidate	Votes	%
Republican	Milinda Morris	5,363	65.0%
Republican	William Booher	2,884	35.0%
Total votes		8,247	100.0%

==== General election ====
Texas's 13th State Senate District General Election, 2020
Party	Candidate	Votes	%
Democratic	Borris Miles (incumbent)	200,195	80.47%
Republican	Milinda Morris	48,581	19.53%
Total votes		248,776	100.00%
Democratic hold			

=== District 18 ===
==== Republican primary ====
Republican primary
Party	Candidate	Votes	%
Republican	Lois Kolkhorst (incumbent)	98,215	100.0%
Total votes		98,215	100.0%

==== Democratic primary ====
Democratic primary
Party	Candidate	Votes	%
Democratic	Michael Antalan	41,182	100.0%
Total votes		41,182	100.0%

==== General election ====
Texas's 18th State Senate District General Election, 2020
Party	Candidate	Votes	%
Republican	Lois Kolkhorst (incumbent)	277,872	65.79%
Democratic	Michael Antalan	144,489	34.21%
Total votes		422,361	100.00%
Republican hold			

=== District 19 ===
2020 Texas's 19th senate district election
- November 3, 2020
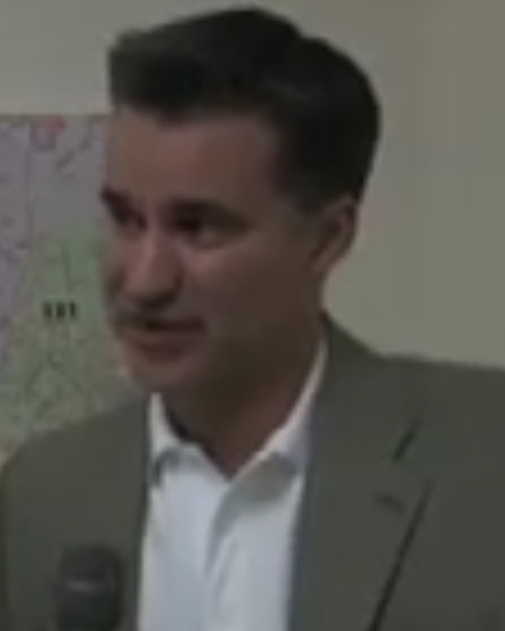

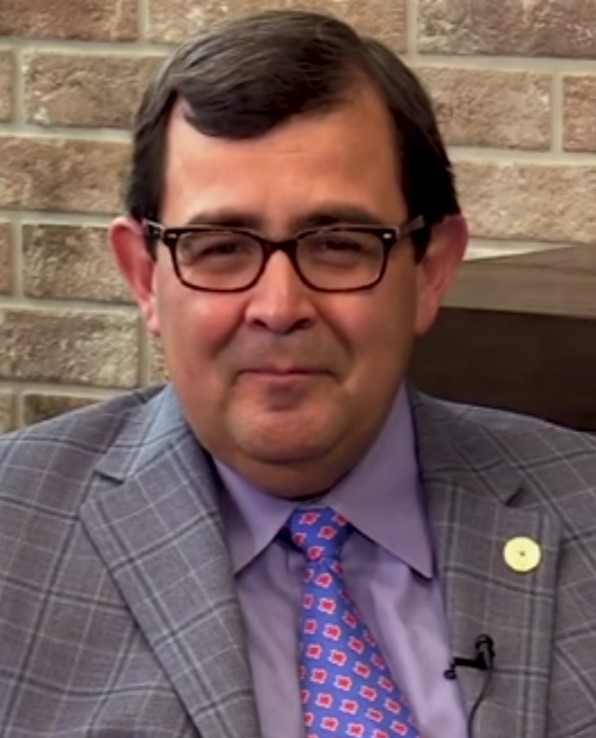
Nominee	Roland Gutierrez	Pete Flores
Party	Democratic	Republican
Popular vote	158,726	148,213
Percentage	49.85%	46.55%
- County results Gutierrez: 50–60% 60–70% Flores: 50–60% 60–70% 70–80% 80–90%
Texas Senator before election
Pete Flores
Republican Party
Elected Texas Senator
Roland Gutierrez
Democratic Party

Incumbent Republican Pete Flores, who was elected in an upset in a 2018 special election, ran for re-election. He was defeated by Democratic state representative Roland Gutierrez.

==== Republican primary ====
Republican primary
Party	Candidate	Votes	%
Republican	Pete Flores (incumbent)	35,526	100.0%
Total votes		35,526	100.0%

==== Democratic primary ====
Democratic primary
Party	Candidate	Votes	%
Democratic	Xochil Pena Rodriguez	30,821	43.9%
Democratic	Roland Gutierrez	26,550	37.8%
Democratic	Freddy Ramirez	12,808	18.3%
Total votes		70,179	100.0%

==== Democratic primary runoff ====
Democratic primary
Party	Candidate	Votes	%
Democratic	Roland Gutierrez	16,640	52.7%
Democratic	Xochil Pena Rodriguez	14,940	47.3%
Total votes		31,580	100.0%

==== General election ====
Texas's 19th State Senate District General Election, 2020
Party	Candidate	Votes	%
Democratic	Roland Gutierrez	158,726	49.85%
Republican	Pete Flores (incumbent)	148,213	46.55%
Libertarian	Jo-Anne Valvdivia	11,465	3.60%
Total votes		318,404	100.00%
Democratic gain from Republican			

=== District 20 ===
==== Democratic primary ====
Democratic primary
Party	Candidate	Votes	%
Democratic	Juan Hinojosa (incumbent)	55,410	100.0%
Total votes		55,410	100.0%

==== Republican primary ====
Republican primary
Party	Candidate	Votes	%
Republican	Judith Cutright	21,246	100.0%
Total votes		21,246	100.0%

==== General election ====
Texas's 20th State Senate District General Election, 2020
Party	Candidate	Votes	%
Democratic	Juan Hinojosa (incumbent)	154,311	58.48%
Republican	Judith Cutright	109,563	41.52%
Total votes		263,874	100.00%
Democratic hold			

=== District 21 ===
==== Democratic primary ====
Democratic primary
Party	Candidate	Votes	%
Democratic	Judith Zaffirini (incumbent)	70,443	100.0%
Total votes		70,443	100.0%

==== Republican primary ====
Republican primary
Party	Candidate	Votes	%
Republican	Frank Pomeroy	29,774	100.0%
Total votes		29,774	100.0%

==== General election ====
Texas's 21st State Senate District General Election, 2020
Party	Candidate	Votes	%
Democratic	Judith Zaffirini (incumbent)	167,672	60.14%
Republican	Frank Pomeroy	111,142	39.86%
Total votes		278,814	100.00%
Democratic hold			

=== District 22 ===
==== Republican primary ====
Republican primary
Party	Candidate	Votes	%
Republican	Brian Birdwell (incumbent)	89,609	100.0%
Total votes		89,609	100.0%

==== Democratic primary ====
Democratic primary
Party	Candidate	Votes	%
Democratic	Robert Vick	36,751	100.0%
Total votes		36,751	100.0%

==== General election ====
Texas's 22nd State Senate District General Election, 2020
Party	Candidate	Votes	%
Republican	Brian Birdwell (incumbent)	257,208	68.45%
Democratic	Robert Vick	118,538	31.55%
Total votes		375,746	100.00%
Republican hold			

=== District 24 ===
==== Republican primary ====
Republican primary
Party	Candidate	Votes	%
Republican	Dawn Buckingham (incumbent)	90,605	100.0%
Total votes		90,605	100.0%

==== Democratic primary ====
Democratic primary
Party	Candidate	Votes	%
Democratic	Clayton Tucker	39,280	100.0%
Total votes		39,280	100.0%

==== General election ====
Texas's 24th State Senate District General Election, 2020
Party	Candidate	Votes	%
Republican	Dawn Buckingham (incumbent)	264,517	69.54%
Democratic	Clayton Tucker	115,853	30.46%
Total votes		380,370	100.00%
Republican hold			

=== District 26 ===
==== Democratic primary ====
Democratic primary
Party	Candidate	Votes	%
Democratic	Jose Menendez (incumbent)	67,062	100.0%
Total votes		67,062	100.0%

==== General election ====
Texas's 26th State Senate District General Election, 2020
Party	Candidate	Votes	%
Democratic	Jose Menendez (incumbent)	199,829	79.99%
Green	Julian Villarreal	50,004	20.01%
Total votes		249,833	100.00%
Democratic hold			

=== District 27 ===
==== Democratic primary ====
Democratic primary
Party	Candidate	Votes	%
Democratic	Eddie Lucio Jr. (incumbent)	31,046	49.8%
Democratic	Sara Stapleton-Barrera	22,221	35.6%
Democratic	Ruben Cortez Jr.	9,122	14.6%
Total votes		62,389	100.0%

==== Democratic primary runoff ====
Democratic primary
Party	Candidate	Votes	%
Democratic	Eddie Lucio Jr. (incumbent)	16,883	53.6%
Democratic	Sara Stapleton-Barrera	14,625	46.4%
Total votes		31,508	100.0%

==== Republican primary ====
Republican primary
Party	Candidate	Votes	%
Republican	Vanessa Tijerina	11,343	100.0%
Total votes		11,343	100.0%

==== General election ====
Texas's 27th State Senate District General Election, 2020
Party	Candidate	Votes	%
Democratic	Eddie Lucio Jr. (incumbent)	134,035	64.81%
Republican	Vanessa Tijerina	72,768	35.19%
Total votes		206,803	100.00%
Democratic hold			

=== District 28 ===
==== Republican primary ====
Republican primary
Party	Candidate	Votes	%
Republican	Charles Perry (incumbent)	90,762	100.0%
Total votes		90,762	100.0%

==== General election ====
Texas's 28th State Senate District General Election, 2020
Party	Candidate	Votes	%
Republican	Charles Perry (incumbent)	248,025	100.00%
Total votes		248,025	100.00%
Republican hold			

=== District 29 ===
==== Democratic primary ====
Democratic primary
Party	Candidate	Votes	%
Democratic	Cesar Blanco	59,620	100.0%
Total votes		59,620	100.0%

==== Republican primary ====
Republican primary
Party	Candidate	Votes	%
Republican	Bethany Hatch	15,817	100.0%
Total votes		15,817	100.00%

==== General election ====
Texas's 29th State Senate District General Election, 2020
Party	Candidate	Votes	%
Democratic	Cesar Blanco	176,360	67.32%
Republican	Bethany Hatch	85,619	32.68%
Total votes		261,979	100.00%
Democratic hold			

== Special elections ==
=== District 14 ===
The seat for District 14 became vacant on April 30, 2020, after the resignation of Kirk Watson. A special election was originally called for July 14, 2020. However, Eddie Rodriguez chose not to contest the resulting runoff, thus the scheduled runoff was canceled and Sarah Eckhardt was deemed elected.

Texas's 14th State Senate District Special Election, 2020
Party	Candidate	Votes	%
Democratic	Sarah Eckhardt	59,267	49.7%
Democratic	Eddie Rodriguez	40,384	33.8%
Republican	Donald Zimmerman	15,565	13.0%
Republican	Waller Thomas Burns II	1,442	1.2%
Independent	Jeff Ridgeway	1,386	1.2%
Libertarian	Pat Dixon	1,306	1.1%
Total votes		119,350	100.0%
Democratic hold			

=== District 30 ===
A special election for Texas State Senate District 30 has been called for September 29, 2020. The candidate filing deadline was August 28, 2020. The seat became vacant after the resignation of Pat Fallon on August 23, 2020.

Texas's 30th State Senate District Special Election, 2020
Party	Candidate	Votes	%
Republican	Shelley Luther	22,135	32.2%
Republican	Drew Springer Jr.	21,971	31.9%
Democratic	Jacob Minter	14,572	21.2%
Republican	Christopher Watts	4,284	6.2%
Republican	Craig Carter	3,413	5.0%
Republican	Andy Hopper	2,432	3.5%
Total votes		68,807	100.0%

==== Runoff ====
Texas's 30th State Senate District Special Election, 2020 runoff
Party	Candidate	Votes	%
Republican	Drew Springer Jr.	32,599	56.45%
Republican	Shelley Luther	25,146	43.55%
Total votes		57,745	100.0%
Republican hold			

== See also ==
- 2020 Texas elections
