= Elizabeth Campos =

Texas legislator

Member of the Texas House of Representatives from the 119th district
- Incumbent
- Assumed office January 12, 2021
- Preceded by: Roland Gutierrez

Personal details
- Born: May 8, 1969 (age 57)
- Party: Democratic
- Website: https://lizcampos.com/

Elizabeth "Liz" Campos (born May 8, 1969) is an American politician serving as a member of the Texas House of Representatives from the 119th district. Elected in November 2020, she assumed office on January 12, 2021.

== Career ==
For 30 years, Campos worked as a legal administrator at several law firms in Texas. She later served as a staffer in the Texas House and Texas Senate, where she worked as a constituent coordinator, House legislative director, Senate district director, and Senate chief of staff for Carlos Uresti. Campos was elected to the Texas House of Representatives in November 2020 and assumed office on January 12, 2021.

Texas House of Representatives
Preceded by Roland Gutierrez	Member of the Texas House of Representatives from the 119th district 2021–present	Incumbent
