= Leo Pacheco =

American educator and politician

Member of the Texas House of Representatives from the 118th district
- In office January 8, 2019 – August 19, 2021
- Preceded by: Tomas Uresti
- Succeeded by: John Lujan

Personal details
- Born: December 12, 1957 (age 68)
- Party: Republican (since 2025); Democratic (until 2025)
- Spouse: Melva
- Children: 2
- Education: San Antonio College (AA); Texas A&M University–San Antonio (BBA); University of Texas at San Antonio (MPA)

Leo Pacheco is an American educator and politician who served in the Texas House of Representatives from January 8, 2019, to August 19, 2021, representing the 118th district.

In 2025, Pacheco joined the Republican Party.

== Early life and education ==
Pacheco's family is descended from the settlers who founded the original San Antonio mission from the Canary Islands. He was raised on San Antonio's South Side. Pacheco graduated from Harlandale High School in 1976. Pacheco became the first member of his family to graduate from college; he earned an associate degree at San Antonio College, a Bachelor of Business Management at Texas A&M University–San Antonio, and a Master of Public Administration at the University of Texas at San Antonio (UTSA). He worked his way through school, including as a bus driver for VIA Metropolitan Transit.

== Career ==
Pacheco was the chair of the Bexar County Democratic Party for four years in the 1990s. He worked as a human resource specialist for Palo Alto College and taught as an adjunct professor at UTSA and San Antonio College.

=== Texas House of Representatives ===
In 2018, Pacheco ran for the Texas House of Representatives for the 118th district in the Democratic Party's primary election against incumbent Tomas Uresti. He defeated Uresti, and faced Republican John Lujan in the general election. Pacheco defeated Lujan, with 58 percent of the vote to Lujan's 42 percent. Pacheco supported Michael Bloomberg in the 2020 Democratic Party presidential primaries.

Pacheco ran for reelection in 2020 and was not opposed in the Democratic Party primary election. He faced Republican Adam Salyer in the November 3, 2020, general election and won with 57% of the vote.

In May 2021, Pacheco was one of seven Democrats to vote in favor of permitless carry in the state of Texas. In result, Bexar County Democratic Party censured him. In the beginning of August 2021, Pacheco announced that he planned to resign from the Texas House during the second session of the Eighty-seventh Texas Legislature. He said that he would resign in order to teach public administration at San Antonio College. Pacheco resigned from the Texas House on August 19, 2021.

== Personal life ==
Pacheco and his wife, Melva, have two children.

Texas House of Representatives
Preceded by Tomas Uresti	Member of the Texas House of Representatives from the 118th district 2019–2021	Succeeded by John Lujan
