= John Lujan =

American politician

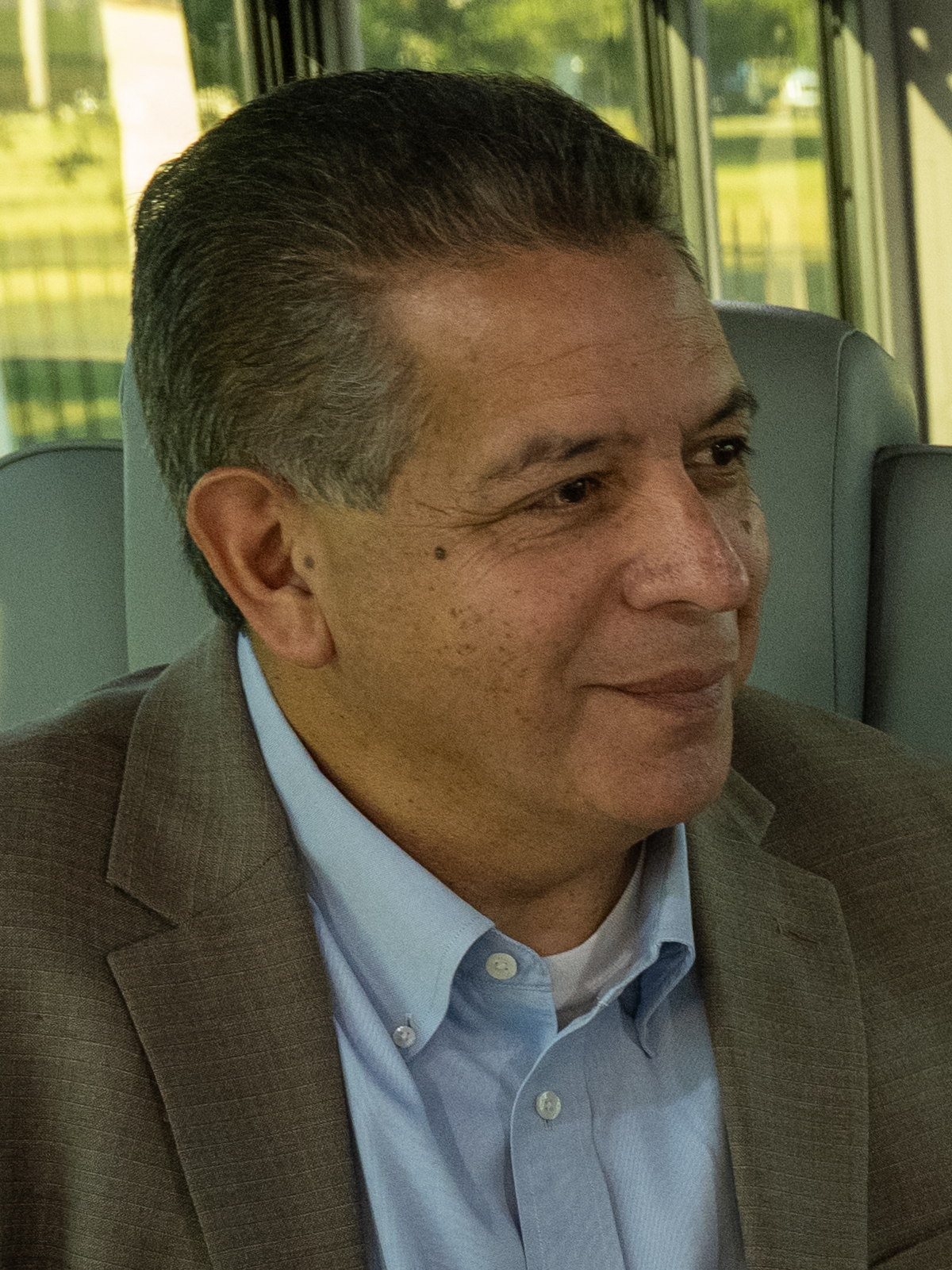
- Lujan in 2024

Member of the Texas House of Representatives from the 118th district
- Incumbent
- Assumed office November 3, 2021
- Preceded by: Leo Pacheco
- Succeeded by: Kristian Carranza (elect)
- In office February 9, 2016 – January 9, 2017
- Preceded by: Joe Farias
- Succeeded by: Tomas Uresti

Personal details
- Born: John Lujan III; June 7, 1962 (age 64) San Antonio, Texas, U.S.
- Party: Republican
- Spouse: Freda Lujan
- Website: Campaign website

John Lujan III (born June 7, 1962) is an American politician. A former firefighter and Bexar County sheriff's deputy, Lujan serves as a Republican member of the Texas House of Representatives for District 118 in San Antonio.

== Texas House of Representatives ==
=== 2016 special election for District 118 ===
Lujan won a special election held on January 26, 2016, to represent District 118, which encompasses part of Bexar County. The position opened with the resignation of Democrat Joe Farias. In the November 2016 general election, he ran for election to a full term but was defeated by the Democrat Tomas Uresti. Lujan's term ended on January 9, 2017.

=== 2018 campaign ===
Lujan sought to return to the legislature in the general election held on November 6, 2018, but was defeated by the Democrat Leo Pacheco, 23,929 votes (58 percent) to 17,298 (42 percent).

=== 2021 special election for District 118 ===
In August 2021, Pacheco announced that he would resign from serving District 118. Lujan stated that he started receiving calls of encouragement from Republicans, such as House Speaker Dade Phelan. On August 17, 2021, Lujan announced his candidacy for District 118 in a special election to replace Pacheco. On September 28, 2021, Lujan was the top finisher in the special election, getting 42% of the vote, while Democrat Frank Ramirez placed second with 20%, placing Lujan and Ramirez in the runoff.

On November 2, 2021, Lujan won the special election runoff to fill District 118, a district in San Antonio that voted for Joe Biden by fourteen points in 2020 and is 73% Hispanic. Lujan defeated Democrat Frank Ramirez 51.2% to 48.8%.

=== 2022 election for District 118 ===
On November 8, 2022 Lujan won his first general election in a rematch against Democrat Frank Ramirez for his District 118 seat 51.8% to 48.2%.

== U.S. House of Representatives ==
In August 2025, Lujan announced that he would run in the 2026 election for the Texas's 35th congressional district seat in the U.S. House of Representatives. He lost to Carlos De La Cruz in the runoff.
