= Frank L. Madla =

American politician (1937–2006)

Frank Lloyd Madla Jr. (January 21, 1937 – November 24, 2006), was for thirty-three years a Democratic member of both the Texas House of Representatives and the Texas State Senate from the south side of San Antonio. Madla died in a house fire in the early morning hours on the Friday after Thanksgiving Day in 2006.

== Political career ==
Madla was initially elected to the lower house of the Texas legislature in a San Antonio-based district in 1972. He served for twenty years in the House until he was elected to the District 24, later District 19, state Senate seat, which is geographically large and stretches from San Antonio to as far west as El Paso. (In Texas, state Senate districts are geographically and demographically larger than United States House of Representatives districts.)

In 1985, Texas Monthly, in its biennial feature on the best and worst Texas legislators named Madla to the "Honorable Mention" category, as one of the top twenty legislators for that session.

In May 2005 a constitutional amendment banning gay marriage in Texas passed the Senate after Madla changed his position and voted for it.

=== 2006 Democratic primary ===
Madla had maintained his Senate seat without opposition until successfully challenged in the Democratic primary held in March 2006 by the District 118 state representative, Carlos I. "Charlie" Uresti. Uresti, a San Antonio attorney, prevailed with 56.5 percent of the vote to Madla's 43.5 percent.

Carla Vela, the then Bexar County Democratic Party chairman, said that issues were less important in the Madla-Uresti race than an ongoing intraparty power struggle involving the political families who control the Southside section of San Antonio.

Shortly after his primary defeat, Madla announced that he would resign his Senate seat early, effective May 31, 2006.

== Personal life ==
Madla was born in just outside San Antonio in Helotes to Frank L. Madla Sr., and the former Epigmenia Alcala. Madla attended St. Mary's University and graduated with a B.A. in Government in 1959, and in 1963, an M.A. in Government. Madla was married in 1961, and he and wife Rosemary had a son, Frank L. Madla, III. Madla was remarried in 1977 to the former Helen Cruz (born June 2, 1954), and had a daughter, Marci Morgan Madla.

Madla was a junior high school teacher for ten years before he entered politics. At various times he worked as an insurance and real estate broker, and an instructor at University of the Incarnate Word.

== Death ==
Madla, along with Mary Cruz, his 81-year-old mother-in-law, and Aleena, his five-year-old granddaughter, died in a house fire. Madla had been asleep in his home upstairs and had tried to escape through the bedroom window. Burglar bars on the windows trapped him, and he succumbed to smoke and flames. His granddaughter was initially thought to have survived, but was declared without brain function and died after being removed from life support a day later. Madla's wife Helen survived the blaze but was hospitalized for a time afterward. Madla's home had no smoke detectors.

U.S. President George W. Bush issued his condolences to the Madla family and promised to pray for Helen Madla's full recovery: "Frank was a dedicated public servant who devoted more than three decades of his life to serving his state and all its people in the Texas House and Senate."

Texas Governor Rick Perry ordered state flags to be flown at half-staff in Madla's honor on November 30, the day of Madla's funeral, and 1 December, the date of his interment in the Texas State Cemetery. Perry issued this tribute: "Frank Madla was a dear friend and a dedicated public servant who was an exemplary representative for South and West Texas. Frank was a mentor to me when I came in to the legislature. He had a heart of gold and was a true Texas patriot. He and his wife, Helen, were two of Anita's [First Lady Anita Thigpen Perry] and my favorites. His death is a tragic loss to the community, to his friends and to his family. Anita and I offer our prayers on behalf of his wife Helen for her continued recovery."

== Legacy ==
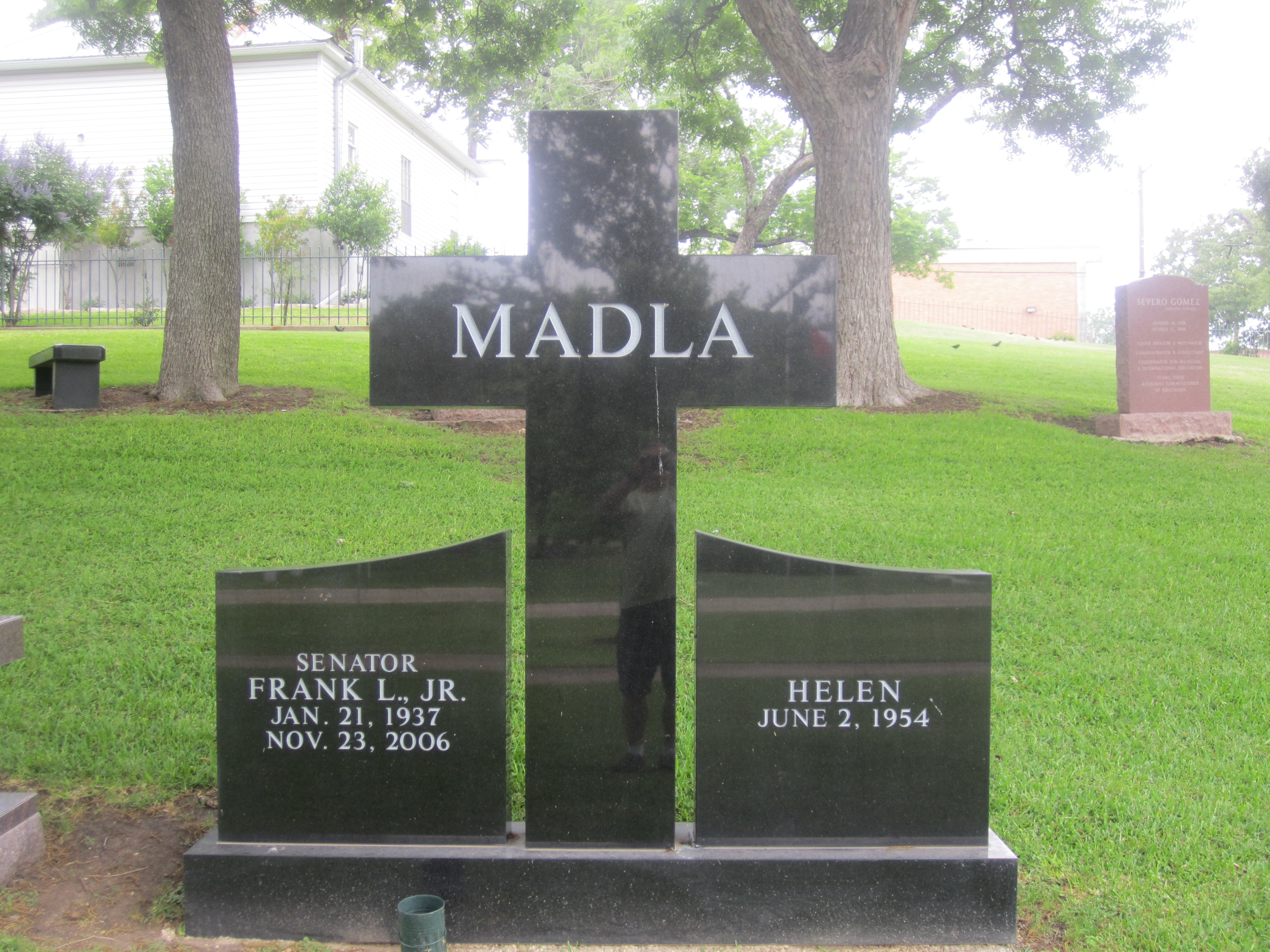
Madla grave at Texas State Cemetery in Austin, Texas

In January 2006, the former Royalgate Elementary School in the South San Antonio Independent School District was renamed Frank Madla Elementary School. Madla described the renaming as the "single best honor" to him ever.

VIA Metropolitan Transit named its Madla Transit Center in his honor. It is located on San Antonio's South Side at the intersection of I-35 and Zarzamora Street.

== Election history ==
Election history of Madla from 1992.

=== Most recent election ===
==== 2006 ====
Democratic Party Primary Election, 2006: Senate District 19
Candidate		Votes	%	±
	Frank L. Madla (Incumbent)	18,936	43.48	
✓	Carlos I. Uresti	24,610	56.51	
Turnout		12,025		

=== Previous elections ===
==== 2002 ====
Texas general election, 2002: Senate District 19
Party	Candidate	Votes	%	±%
Democratic	Frank L. Madla (Incumbent)	76,590	100.00	0.00
Majority		76,590	100.00	+37.89
Turnout		76,590		+37.89
Democratic hold				

==== 1998 ====
Texas general election, 1998: Senate District 19
Party	Candidate	Votes	%	±%
Democratic	Frank L. Madla (Incumbent)	55,544	100.00	0.00
Majority		55,544	100.00	−8.07
Turnout		55,544		−8.07
Democratic hold				

==== 1994 ====
Texas general election, 1994: Senate District 19
Party	Candidate	Votes	%	±%
Democratic	Frank L. Madla (Incumbent)	60,422	100.00	
Majority		60,422	100.00	
Turnout		60,422		
Democratic hold				

==== 1992 ====
Texas general election, 1992: Senate District 24
Party	Candidate	Votes	%	±%
Democratic	Frank L. Madla	110,534	100.00	
Majority		110,534	100.00	
Turnout		110,534		
Democratic hold				

Texas House of Representatives
Preceded by New district	Member of the Texas House of Representatives from District 57-A (San Antonio); 1973–1983	Succeeded by Obsolete district
Preceded by Inactive district	Member of the Texas House of Representatives from District 117 (San Antonio); 1983–1993	Succeeded by John Longoria
Texas Senate
Preceded by Robert Temple Dickson III	Texas State Senator from District 24 (San Antonio); 1993–1995	Succeeded by Bill Sims
Preceded by Gregory Luna	Texas State Senator from District 19 (San Antonio); 1995–2006	Succeeded by Carlos I. Uresti
Preceded by Florence Shapiro	President pro tempore of the Texas Senate; 30 May 2005–17 April 2006	Succeeded by Royce West
