= Pete Flores =

American politician

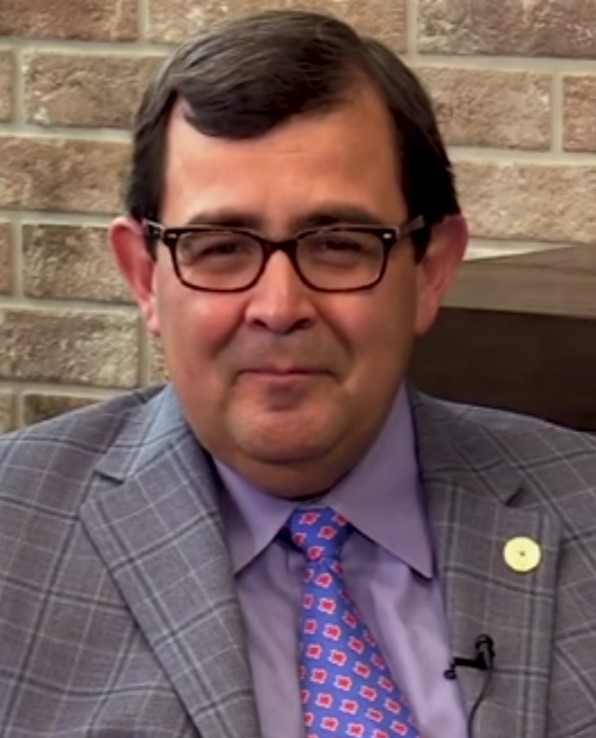
- Flores in 2019

Member of the Texas Senate
- Incumbent
- Assumed office January 10, 2023
- Preceded by: Dawn Buckingham
- Constituency: 24th district
- In office October 12, 2018 – January 12, 2021
- Preceded by: Carlos Uresti
- Succeeded by: Roland Gutierrez
- Constituency: 19th district

Personal details
- Born: January 30, 1960 (age 66) Minot Air Force Base, North Dakota, U.S.
- Party: Republican
- Children: 2
- Education: Texas A&M University (BA)
- Occupation: Game warden
- Website: Office website Campaign website

Peter Paul Flores (born January 30, 1960) is an American politician representing Texas Senate District 24. He previously represented District 19 in the Texas Senate from 2018 to 2021. A member of the Republican Party, he was the first Hispanic Republican Texas State Senator in Texas history, and he was the first Republican to be elected in District 19 since 1879 during the Reconstruction Era. In the 2020 election, Flores was defeated by his Democratic challenger Roland Gutierrez. Flores won the Republican nomination for Texas State Senate District 24 on May 24, 2022, defeating Raul Reyes by 60% to 40%.

== Early life ==
Flores's parents, Margarito and Lilia Flores, retired in Laredo, Texas. Flores grew up in South Texas. He graduated from Laredo Martin High and attended Laredo Junior College before graduating from Texas A&M University. Flores worked as a farm technician for Texas A&M Veterinary School then was accepted to the Texas Game Warden Academy in 1985.

== Career ==
Flores retired as a Colonel Game Warden for Texas Parks and Wildlife. He is a former leader of Texas Parks and Wildlife's statewide law enforcement division. He was the first Hispanic to hold that position.

== Texas Senate ==
In 2016, Flores ran for the Texas Senate District 19, losing to Democratic incumbent Carlos Uresti with about 40% of the vote. District 19 is geographically the largest district in the Texas Senate, with about 400 miles of the Texas–Mexico border, and it contains all or part of 17 counties spread over more than 35,000 square miles in the southwestern portion of the state. The district is 66% Hispanic.

=== 2018 special election ===
Uresti resigned from his senate seat after being convicted of federal fraud and money laundering charges in February 2018, and a special election was called. Flores ran for the seat again, and in an upset, Flores won the September 18, 2018, special election for state senate district 19 over former state representative and U.S. Congressman Pete Gallego 57% to 43%. Flores took 81% of the Medina County, Texas vote, yielding him a 3,000-vote lead, which Gallego could not overcome. Flores served out the remaining two years and three months of a term formerly held by Uresti. Flores was endorsed by U.S. Senators John Cornyn and Ted Cruz, Governor Greg Abbott, and Lt. Governor Dan Patrick. During the campaign he stated that his focus would be on property tax reform, economic development, support for law enforcement, support for the unborn, and support for the 2nd Amendment.

=== 2020 general election ===
Flores ran for re-election in 2020. He lost to Democratic nominee Roland Gutierrez by three points. The election ended with the district going towards the Democrats, having the Republican-led State Senate losing their supermajority.

=== 2022 State Senate election ===
Flores won the Republican primary runoff for State Senate District 24 on May 24, 2022, defeating Raul Reyes 59% to 41%. As a result of the 2020 United States Census, State Senate District 24 was redrawn in 2021 to include Flores' hometown of Pleasanton and extend north into the heavily-Republican Texas Hill Country region. Flores has the backing of Lt. Governor Dan Patrick and former incumbent of the seat, Dawn Buckingham, who resigned the seat to run for the statewide office of land commissioner. Given the strong Republican lean of District 24 that would've gone for former President Donald Trump by 19.3 points in 2020, Flores easily won in the General Election against democratic opponent, Kathy Jones-Hospod, securing his return to the Texas Senate.

== Political positions ==
=== Property tax reform ===
Flores supports lowering Texas's property taxes. He believes that Texas taxpayers are overtaxed and the current tax rates are unsustainable. He wants to change the way property is being appraised. He wants a uniform methodology of appraisal that is consistent throughout Texas, instead of having 254 different counties using 254 different ways, limiting the role of individual chief appraisers in the each county. He wants the appraisers to be accountable to the voters. He wants the members of the board of appraisal districts to be voted in office, instead of appointed by taxing entities, making them directly accountable to the voters, removing the buffer that separates the taxing entities and the voters that currently exists. He has said, "The system is broken. We need some meaningful tax reform so you and I can keep our houses and we won’t be taxed out of our property. We want to pay our fair share, but it’s not right to have a system that’s not fair and equitable."

=== Abortion ===
Flores opposes abortion.

=== Child pornography ===
In 2025, Flores authored Texas Senate Bill 20, a piece of legislation also known as the "Stopping AI-Generated Child Pornography Act", that creates new criminal offenses for those who possess, promote, or view visual material deemed obscene, which is said to depict a child, whether it is an actual person, animated or cartoon depiction, or an image of someone created through computer software or artificial intelligence. It was passed by the Texas Legislature on May 28, 2025 unanimously in both chambers. It was signed into law by Governor Greg Abbott on June 20, 2025. It went into effect on September 1, 2025. Flores told senators that technology which enabled the production of "offensive" material by child predators had "no redeeming value whatsoever" and asserted that the materials had often been "used to groom and abuse children." His work on the bill was praised by Lieutenant Governor Dan Patrick, who called the law "a priority" to protect children in Texas and Texas citizens.

Some critics described the law as unconstitutional, saying it violated the Free Speech Clause of the First Amendment which prohibits abridgement of freedom of speech and the press, including the legal precedent set in Ashcroft v. Free Speech Coalition. Much of the controversy regarding the law involves the broad language pertaining to "obscene" pornographic images as including A.I.-created, animated, and cartoon depictions, with some critics arguing it could have a chilling effect on anime, manga, graphic novels, and other media produced, distributed, or created within Texas.

== Personal life ==
Flores and his wife Elizabeth, married in 1982, live in Pleasanton, Texas, where he decided to retire after working for 27 years as a state peace officer. They have two children and two grandchildren. Flores has six sisters who are all school teachers.

== Electoral history ==
2020 general election results
Party	Candidate	Votes	%
Democratic	Roland Gutierrez	158,726	49.9
Republican	Pete Flores (incumbent)	148,213	46.5
Libertarian	Jo-Anne Valvdivia	11,465	3.6
Total votes		318,404	100
Democratic gain from Republican			

2018 special election (runoff) results
Party	Candidate	Votes	%
Republican	Pete Flores	25,330	56.67
Democratic	Pete Gallego	19,367	43.33
Total votes		44,697	100
Republican gain from Democratic			

2018 special election results
Party	Candidate	Votes	%
Republican	Pete Flores	9,003	32.35
Democratic	Pete Gallego	7,580	28.38
Democratic	Roland Gutierrez	6,389	24.38
Republican	Carlos Antonio Raymond	920	3.51
Democratic	Tomas Uresti	799	3.05
Democratic	Charlie Urbina Jones	789	3.01
Republican	Jesse (Jay) Alaniz	461	1.76
Libertarian	Tony Valdivia	266	1.01
Total votes		26,207	100

2016 general election results
Party	Candidate	Votes	%
Democratic	Carlos Uresti	134,997	55.87
Republican	Pete Flores	97,682	40.43
Libertarian	Maximilian Martin	8,948	3.70
Total votes		241,627	100
Democratic hold			

Texas Senate
Preceded by Carlos Uresti	Texas State Senator from District 19; 2018–2021	Succeeded by Roland Gutierrez
Preceded by Dawn Buckingham	Texas State Senator from District 24; 2023–present	Incumbent
