= Kristian Carranza =

American politician

Member-elect of the Texas House of Representatives from the 118th district
- Assuming office January 12, 2027
- Succeeding: John Lujan

Personal details
- Born: Kristian Thompson San Antonio, Texas, U.S.
- Party: Democratic

Kristian Carranza (née Thompson) is an American politician. A member of the Democratic Party, she is the member-elect for the 118th district of the Texas House of Representatives.
