= Roland Gutierrez (politician) =

American politician (born 1970)

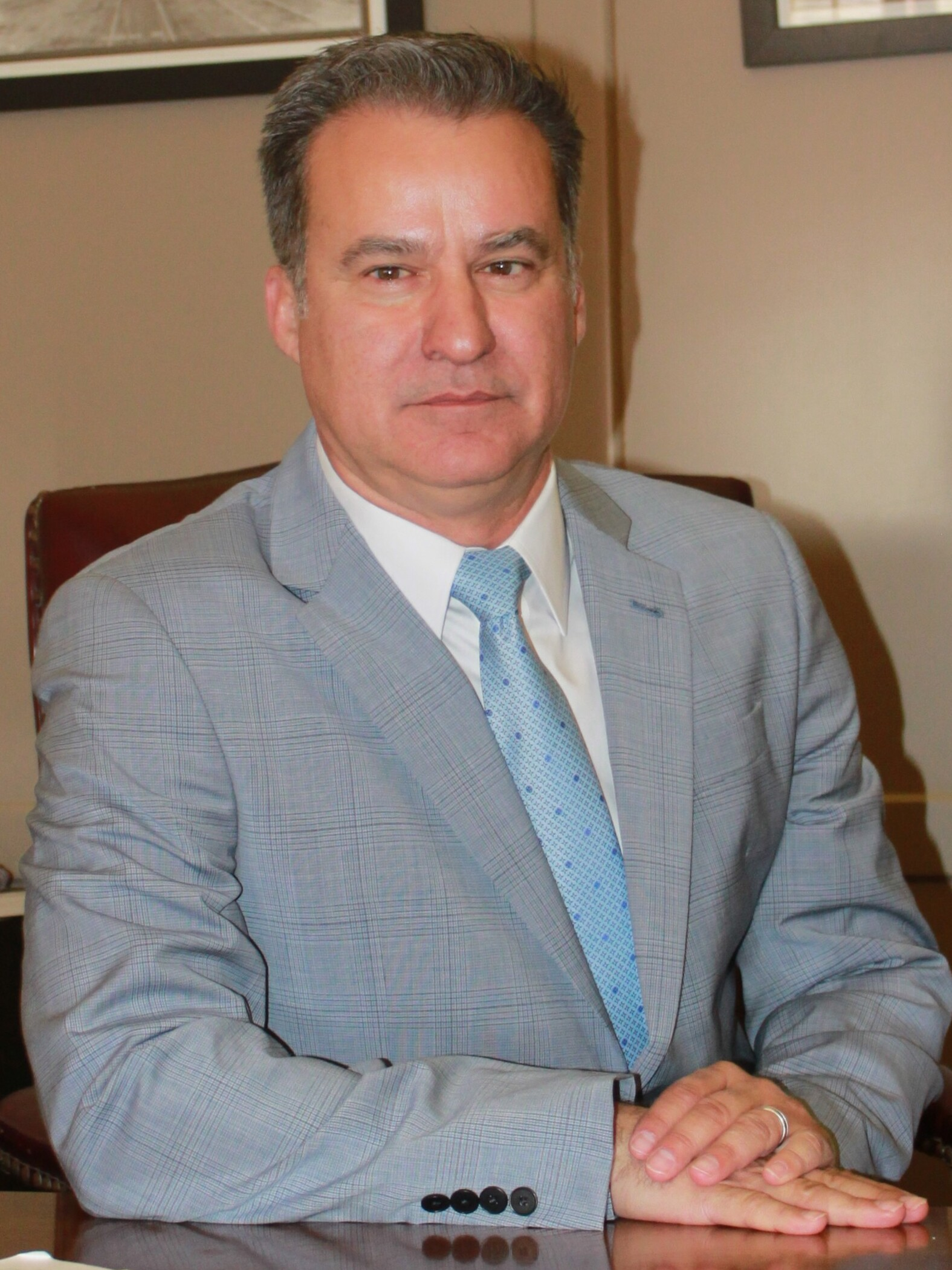
- Gutierrez in 2025

Member of the Texas Senate from the 19th district
- Incumbent
- Assumed office January 12, 2021
- Preceded by: Pete Flores

Member of the Texas House of Representatives from the 119th district
- In office May 14, 2008 – January 12, 2021
- Preceded by: Robert Prenter
- Succeeded by: Elizabeth Campos

Personal details
- Born: September 1, 1970 (age 56) San Antonio, Texas, U.S.
- Party: Democratic
- Spouse: Sarah Gutierrez
- Children: 2
- Education: University of Texas, San Antonio (BA); St. Mary's University, Texas (JD)
- Website: Office website Campaign website

Roland Gutierrez (born September 1, 1970) is an American attorney and politician. A member of the Democratic Party, Gutierrez has served as a member of the Texas Senate since 2021, representing District 19. He formerly served as a member of the Texas House of Representatives from 2008 to 2021. On July 10, 2023, Gutierrez announced his candidacy in the 2024 United States Senate election in Texas, in which he finished second in the Democratic primary.

== Education ==
Gutierrez is a graduate of the University of Texas at San Antonio, where he received a B.A. in Political Science, and St. Mary's University School of Law, where he received his Juris Doctor degree, also in San Antonio.

== Political career ==
Gutierrez was first elected to the San Antonio City Council in 2005. During his time on the city council, he worked to create safer communities through after-school programs, public libraries, and sidewalks. He was then elected to the Texas House of Representatives in 2008. While serving in the House, Gutierrez chaired the House Committee on Defense and Veterans' Affairs on appointment from Republican House Speaker Joe Straus, also of San Antonio.

In 2020, Gutierrez ran to represent District 19 Texas Senate against incumbent Republican Pete Flores. On November 3, 2020, Gutierrez defeated Flores, winning with 50% of the vote to 47% for Flores. Gutierrez won re-election in 2022.

As part of the Texas Senate, Gutierrez serves on the Local Government, Veteran Affairs, and the Water, Agriculture & Rural Affairs committees.

Gutierrez, whose district encompasses Uvalde, Texas, introduced four gun safety bills following the 2022 Robb Elementary School shooting. In 2023, some news outlets reported that Gutierrez was likely to run for the U.S. Senate in the 2024 election against incumbent Ted Cruz, and officially announced his intent to do so on July 10, 2023. Ultimately, however, he was passed over for the nomination in favor of Colin Allred, who then lost against Cruz.

== Electoral history ==
=== 2024 ===
2024 United States Senate election in Texas, Democratic primary results
Party	Candidate	Votes	%
Democratic	Colin Allred	569,585	58.87%
Democratic	Roland Gutierrez	160,978	16.64%
Democratic	Mark Gonzalez	85,228	8.81%
Democratic	Meri Gomez	44,166	4.56%
Democratic	Carl Sherman	31,694	3.28%
Democratic	Robert Hassan	21,855	2.26%
Democratic	Steven Keough	21,801	2.25%
Democratic	Heli Rodriguez-Prilliman	18,801	1.94%
Democratic	Thierry Tchenko	13,395	1.38%
Total votes		967,503	100.00%

=== 2022 ===
Texas General Election, 2022: Texas Senate, District 19
Party	Candidate	Votes	%
Democratic	Roland Gutierrez	117,491	55.39
Republican	Robert Garza	94,613	44.61
Total votes		212,104	100
Democratic hold			

=== 2020 ===
Texas General Election, 2020: Texas Senate, District 19
Party	Candidate	Votes	%
Democratic	Roland Gutierrez	158,726	49.9
Republican	Pete Flores (incumbent)	148,213	46.5
Libertarian	Jo-Anne Valvdivia	11,465	3.6
Total votes		318,404	100
Democratic gain from Republican			

=== 2018 ===
Texas General Election, 2018: State Representative District 119
Party	Candidate	Votes	%
Democratic	Roland Gutierrez	30,331	100
Democratic hold			

=== 2016 ===
Texas General Election, 2016: State Representative District 119
Party	Candidate	Votes	%
Democratic	Roland Gutierrez	33,384	100
Democratic hold			
