= Red Berry (Texas politician) =

American politician (1899–1969)

Virgil Edward "Red" Berry (February 27, 1899 – November 24, 1969) was a Texas politician who represented San Antonio in both the Texas House of Representatives and the Texas Senate in the 1960s. He was also widely known for his involvement in gambling in the San Antonio area throughout the 1930s, 1940s, and 1950s.

== Biography ==
Berry was born February 27, 1899, near Fort Smith, Arkansas, one of 13 children. As a young man, he worked as an office clerk in Fort Smith, and, later, for the Union Pacific Railroad as a machinist apprentice. In World War I, he served in the 60th Railway Transportation Corps in the U.S. Army in France. He was later stationed at Fort Sam Houston in San Antonio as an MP. In this capacity he patrolled downtown San Antonio streets for wayward soldiers.

After his departure from the Army, Berry returned to San Antonio in 1929. With his knowledge of San Antonio's seamier side, he entered the gambling business. He opened the elegant Turf Club in 1934 on Soledad Street. He was convicted for shooting Otto "Skeeter" Klaus—a bootlegger and murderer—with a sawed-off shotgun. The verdict was appealed, but no retrial ever took place, sparing Berry jail time. The Turf Club was raided by the Texas Rangers in October 1944, but the club remained open.

Berry was considered the prime suspect in the 1945 shotgun-blast murder of another San Antonio gambling kingpin, Hersel Gray, but was never indicted. He was indicted two other times for murder, but never convicted. By the time the Turf Club finally closed in 1957, Berry had moved his gambling operations twice.

The first move was to the nearby town of La Vernia, Texas. While his gambling interests were based there, Berry won—in a game of Pitch—title to an 84-acre (34 ha) tract of land southeast of Fort Sam Houston. In 1951, he constructed a 13,000-square-foot (1,200 m^{2}) house in the style of a French chateau that included a full basement, where he subsequently moved his casino. A police raid in 1955 confiscated his gambling equipment and closed down the operation.

In 1960, with the dual goals of gaining respectability for himself and pushing for the legalization of parimutuel wagering on horse-racing in Texas, Berry won the Democratic Party primary for District 68, Place 4, in the Texas House of Representatives. In the general election, the 61-year-old Berry faced off against 29-year-old Republican Henry Catto, son of a prominent insurance man in San Antonio. During the campaign, which included a televised debate, Berry referred to Catto as "kiddo" and "fat cat Catto". In the heavily Democratic Texas of the era, Berry won the election with 54 percent of the vote.

After serving his freshman term in the Texas House in the 57th Legislature, Berry was re-elected to the 58th and the 59th Legislatures. When Walter Richter did not seek re-election to his Texas Senate seat, Berry successfully ran for the District 19 seat in 1966. Berry was re-elected in 1968. While still a sitting senator, Berry succumbed to cancer on November 24, 1969, in San Antonio.

Berry was married to the former Lydia Josephine Galloway. They had a son, Duke Edward Berry, in 1938.

Texas House of Representatives
Preceded by James A. McKay, Jr.	Member of the Texas House of Representatives from District 68-4 (San Antonio); 1961–1967	Succeeded by Inactive district
Texas Senate
Preceded by Walter Richter	Texas State Senator from District 19 (San Antonio); 1967–1969	Succeeded by Glenn Kothmann
