= Beverly Powell =

American politician (born 1951)

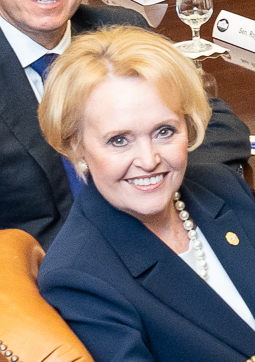
- Powell in 2021

Member of the Texas Senate from the 10th district
- In office January 8, 2019 – January 10, 2023
- Preceded by: Konni Burton
- Succeeded by: Phil King

Personal details
- Born: September 18, 1951 (age 75) Fort Worth, Texas, U.S.
- Party: Democratic
- Education: Texas Wesleyan University (BS, MBA)

Beverly Powell (born September 18, 1951) is an American politician from the state of Texas. A Democrat, she represented District 10 in the Texas Senate from 2019 to 2023.

In 2018, Powell defeated incumbent Republican Senator Konni Burton by a margin of 3.4%.

In 2021, during redistricting, Texas Republicans redrew District 10 to be whiter and more conservative than it was before. The old district had been located entirely in Tarrant County, and voted for Joe Biden by eight points. The new district stretches into portions of six nearby counties and would have given Donald Trump a 16-point margin had it existed in 2020. Powell concluded the new district was "unwinnable" for a Democrat, and she decided to give up her bid for re-election and urged her supporters to work on "efforts to advance our causes and on the continuing efforts to restore voting rights" instead. Then-State Representative Phil King from Weatherford was thus elected unopposed.
