= Glenn Kothmann =

American politician

Glenn Harold Kothmann (born May 30, 1928) was a San Antonio, Texas politician. He represented Bexar County as a Democrat in the Texas House of Representatives and Texas Senate for 26 years between 1957 and 1987. Kothmann is a 1950 graduate from Texas A&M University, where he was a varsity athlete.

== Political career ==
Kothmann represented Bexar County for ten years in the Texas House of Representatives in three nonconsecutive stints. His first two-year term was from 1957 to 1959. Kothmann was returned to the House for three terms from 1961 to 1967, and served a final term from 1969 to 1971.

In 1972, Kothmann was elected to the Texas Senate from District 19 representing a portion of Bexar County for the 62nd Legislature and served to the 69th Legislature. Kothmann did not seek reelection to another senate term in 1986.

In July 1973, Kothmann was named one of the ten worst legislators by Texas Monthly magazine in their biennial feature on best and worst Texas legislators. The article referred to Kothmann as "easily the densest member of the Senate" and noted he "has no legislative program of any consequence and seems proud of the fact".

In 1975, for the regular session of the 64th Legislature, Kothmann was elected as President Pro Tempore of the Senate. In that capacity, he served as Acting Governor of Texas on 28 June 1975. Kothmann wrote and helped to secure passage of SB 276 to establish the San Antonio State School, a long-term residential facility for the intellectually disabled. Despite that accomplishment, in July of that same year, he was again named one of the ten worst legislators by Texas Monthly.

In 1977, Kothmann reappeared on Texas Monthly's Ten Worst list as the only legislator named to it for three consecutive sessions. He was described as "hopelessly inept" and "an embarrassment even in a lackluster Senate."

In 1979, Kothmann was a member of the Killer Bees, the group of twelve quorum-busting Democratic senators that hid out in an Austin garage apartment for 4 1/2 days.

In 1983, during the 68th Legislature, Kothmann was described as "hilariously inept" as he made a return appearance on the Texas Monthly Ten Worst list after a six-year absence. He was also said to be "the only senator in Texas history to climb as high as fourth in seniority without being named a committee chairman."

After the 69th Legislature, Kothmann was described as a "monument to the indifference of the people of South San Antonio, who have endured nonrepresentation in the Senate for fourteen years" as he made his final appearance on the Texas Monthly Ten Worst list.

Preceded by Charles J. Lieck, Jr.	Member of the Texas House of Representatives from District 68-4 (San Antonio); 1957–1959	Succeeded by James A. McKay, Jr.
Preceded by Marshall O. Bell	Member of the Texas House of Representatives from District 68-5 (San Antonio); 1961–1967	Succeeded by Inactive district
Preceded by Don Hand	Member of the Texas House of Representatives from District 57-8 (San Antonio); 1969–1971	Succeeded by Nelson Wolff
Preceded by V. E. "Red" Berry	Texas State Senator from District 19 (San Antonio); 1971–1987	Succeeded by Frank Tejeda
