= Konni Burton =

American politician (born 1963)

Member of the Texas Senate from the 10th district
- In office January 13, 2015 – January 8, 2019
- Preceded by: Wendy Davis
- Succeeded by: Beverly Powell

Personal details
- Born: Kerrville, Texas, U.S.
- Party: Republican
- Spouse: Phil
- Children: 2
- Education: University of North Texas
- Occupation: Businesswoman
- Website: konniburton.com

Konni Lyn Burton (born April 15, 1963) is an American businesswoman who is a Republican former member of the Texas State Senate for District 10. Backed by the Tea Party movement, Burton on January 13, 2015, succeeded Wendy R. Davis of Fort Worth, who vacated the state Senate after her unsuccessful campaign as the Democratic gubernatorial nominee in the 2014 Texas gubernatorial election.

== Early life, education, and career ==
Burton holds a Bachelor of Business Administration degree from the University of North Texas. Burton is a homemaker; she previously was the owner of a wedding consulting business.

== Political career ==
Before running for office, Burton was vice president of the NE Tarrant Tea Party.

=== 2014 election ===
In the 2014 elections, Burton was "considered a rock star in Republican circles." In the March 4, 2014 Republican primary election (and the May 27, 2014 primary runoff) for the state Senate, Burton was endorsed by U.S. Senator Ted Cruz. In the first round, Burton came in first place among the five-way Republican field, garnering 43% of the vote and advancing to a runoff against former State Representative Mark M. Shelton, who received 35 percent. In the primary runoff, Burton gained the Republican nomination; Burton received 17,435 votes (60%), while Shelton received 11,515 votes (40%).

Burton then defeated the Democratic nominee, Libby Willis, who carried Wendy Davis's support, 95,484 votes (53%) to 80,806 (45%), retaking the Senate seat for the Republicans.

=== State Senate tenure ===
Burton is a member of the Higher Education, Criminal Justice, Nominations, and Veteran Affairs & Military Installations committees, and serves as vice-chair of the latter committee.

A Rice University Baker Institute study of Texas Senate roll-call votes from January 2011 to May 2017 showed that Burton was the most conservative member of the Texas Senate.

During the 2016 Republican presidential primaries, Burton was a staunch supporter of Ted Cruz.

==== Abortion ====
Burton is an opponent of abortion. She supported legislation to defund Planned Parenthood by cutting off its Medicaid funds, even for non-abortion general healthcare services. She opposed the U.S. Supreme Court's decision in Whole Woman's Health v. Hellerstedt (which struck down Texas's restrictive abortion law as unconstitutional) saying that she was "extremely disappointed" in the ruling. Burton took office in January 2015 wearing cowboy boots bearing the phrase "Stand for Life," a fashion statement mirrored after Wendy Davis' choice of pink tennis shoes during 2013's abortion bill filibuster.

==== Economy ====
Burton barred taxpayer-funded lobbyists (i.e., lobbyists representing governmental entities) from her office, and supported legislation to ban governmental entities from hiring lobbyists.

Burton has supported limitations on local control in Texas, saying that the state should "step in" to restrict municipalities from passing ordinances that regulate issues such as the phase-out of lightweight plastic bags and Uber. Burton also opposes local ordinances banning texting while driving.

Burton has introduced legislation in the Senate to abolish civil asset forfeiture in the state.

==== Education ====
In November 2016, Burton introduced S.B. 242, which would amend state law to make a parent entitled to all of a school district's written records about their child's "general physical, psychological or emotional well-being" and provide that an attempt by a school employee to conceal or encourage a child to withhold information would be grounds for discipline. Burton introduced the bill in response to Fort Worth Independent School District guidelines (later rescinded) that sought to protect transgender students from being "outed" to their parents. The bill was condemned by LGBT advocates such as Equality Texas, which issued a statement saying that "the legislation would essentially destroy protected communications between a student and an educator. The bill was also opposed by the Texas State Teachers Association and educators' groups, who said that the bill could harm trust between teachers and students and potentially force teachers to share "unsubstantiated rumors" with parents. According to the Austin Chronicle, Burton refused to field questions from the press in regard to SB 242, directing them instead to her website. Amid the furor, Burton's chief of staff said that her legislation would not force schools to "out" LGBT students.

On the other hand, supporters of Burton's bill have been quick to point out that the bill was created in response to a Fort Worth School District deciding to withhold information from parents (without any parental input). Additionally, Burton herself has stressed on numerous occasions that the words "sexuality" and "gender" are not listed in the bill. Instead, the bill would require the release of written documentation of a students "general physical, psychological or emotional well-being", which many people believe is a parental right and therefore cannot be circumvented by local school districts.

On Friday February 9, 2018, Burton walked during a presentation by County Judge Glen Whitley of Hurst. Whitley challenged that the reason that local property taxes were high is that the state was budgeting for a 14 percent local tax increase instead of increasing funds for education. Burton countered in an open letter posted on her official webpage that Whitley was " … was uninformed at best and willfully misleading at worst."

=== 2018 re-election bid ===
Burton lost her bid for reelection in the general election held on November 6, 2018, to Democratic nominee Beverly Powell, a businesswoman and a former president of the Burleson Independent School District school board who carried the endorsement of the Dallas Morning News. Powell unseated Burton, 148,544 (51.7 percent) to 138,695 (48.3 percent).

== Later career ==
Following the election, Burton founded the online right-wing website The Texan in 2019.

== Personal life ==
Burton and her husband, Phil, have two adopted daughters. Phil Burton is the vice president of the McKinney, Texas branch of construction manufacturing company Simpson Strong-Tie.

According to financial disclosure forms, in addition to their home in Colleyville, the Burtons own two condos in Port Aransas, which they rent out, and 107 acres in Hamilton County west of Waco, Texas.

The Burtons belong to the Calvary Lutheran Church in Richland Hills in Tarrant County; she is a former member of the church council.

Texas Senate
Preceded by Wendy R. Davis	Texas State Senator for Tarrant County (District 10); 2015–2019	Succeeded by Beverly Powell
