= Texas's 19th Senate district =

American legislative district

Texas's 19th State Senate district
Senator
Roland Gutierrez; D–San Antonio
- Demographics: 22.3% White; 8% Black; 67.8% Hispanic; 2.2% Asian
- Population: 901,953

District 19 of the Texas Senate is a senatorial district that currently serves all of Crockett, Edwards, Frio, Kinney, Maverick, Real, Terrell, Uvalde, Val Verde, and Zavala counties, and portions of Atascosa , Bexar, Brewster, and Guadalupe counties in the U.S. state of Texas. The district is currently served by Democrat Roland Gutierrez.

District 19 is one of the largest legislative districts in the United States, containing all or part of 14 counties and covering more than 35,000 square miles and about 400 miles of the Texas-Mexico border. Redistricting in 2010 led to District 19 losing several western counties and gaining several eastern ones. The district is 66% Hispanic.

== Biggest cities in the district ==
District 19 has a population of 800,501 with 566,604 that is at voting age from the 2010 census.

	Name	County	Pop. (Note: Population is based on the number of people in the district in that city, not the overall population of that city)
1	San Antonio	Bexar/Medina	315,479
2	Del Rio	Val Verde	35,591
3	Eagle Pass	Maverick	26,248
4	Uvalde	Uvalde	15,751
5	Universal City	Bexar	9,896

== Election history ==
Election history of District 20 from 1992. (Note: Uncontested primary elections are not shown.)

=== 2022 ===
Texas general election, 2022: Senate District 19
Party	Candidate	Votes	%	±%
Democratic	Roland Gutierrez (Incumbent)	117,491	55.39	+5.54
Republican	Robert Garza	94,613	44.61	−1.94
Turnout		212,104		
Democratic hold		Swing		

=== 2020 ===
Texas general election, 2020: Senate District 19
Party	Candidate	Votes	%	±%
Democratic	Roland Gutierrez	158,726	49.85	+6.52
Republican	Pete Flores (Incumbent)	148,213	46.55	−10.3
Libertarian	Jo-Anne Valvdivia	11,465	3.60	+3.6
Turnout		318,404		
Democratic gain from Republican		Swing		

=== 2018 (special) ===
Texas Senate District 19 special runoff election - 18 September 2018
Party	Candidate	Votes	%	±%
Republican	Pete Flores	25,330	56.67	+24.32
Democratic	Pete Gallego	19,367	43.33	+14.95
Total votes		44,697	100	
Republican gain from Democratic				

Texas Senate District 19 special election - 31 July 2018
Party	Candidate	Votes	%
Republican	Pete Flores	9,003	34.35
Democratic	Pete Gallego	7,580	28.92
Democratic	Roland Gutierrez	6,389	24.38
Republican	Carlos Antonio Raymond	920	3.51
Democratic	Tomas Uresti	799	3.05
Democratic	Charlie Urbina Jones	789	3.01
Republican	Jesse (Jay) Alaniz	461	1.76
Libertarian	Tony Valdivia	266	1.01
Total votes		26,207	100

=== 2016 ===
Texas general election, 2016: Senate District 19
Party	Candidate	Votes	%	±%
Democratic	Carlos Uresti	134,997	55.87	−3.53
Republican	Pete Flores	97,682	40.43	−0.16
Libertarian	Maximilian Martin	8,948	3.70	N/A
Turnout		241,627		
Democratic hold				

Democratic primary, 2016: Senate District 19
Candidate		Votes	%	±
	Helen Madla	13,627	25.44	
✓	Carlos Uresti (Incumbent)	39,931	74.56	

=== 2012 ===
Texas general election, 2012: Senate District 19
Party	Candidate	Votes	%	±%
Democratic	Carlos Uresti	122,214	59.40	+7.27
Republican	Michael Berlanga	83,522	40.59	−4.49
Turnout		205,736		
Democratic hold				

=== 2010 ===
Texas general election, 2010: Senate District 19
Party	Candidate	Votes	%	±%
Democratic	Carlos Uresti	61,327	52.13	−7.05
Republican	Dick Bowen	53,024	45.08	+4.26
Libertarian	Mette A. Baker	3,269	2.77	N/A
Turnout		117,620		
Democratic hold				

Democratic primary, 2010: Senate District 19
Candidate		Votes	%	±
✓	Carlos Uresti (Incumbent)	25,969	76.16	
	Luis Juarez Jr.	8,125	23.83	
Turnout		34,094	100.00	

=== 2006 ===
Texas general election, 2006: Senate District 19
Party	Candidate	Votes	%	±%
Democratic	Carlos Uresti	58,876	59.17	−40.83
Republican	Dick Bowen	40,621	40.83	+40.83
Majority		18,225	18.35	−81.65
Turnout		99,497		
Democratic hold				

==== Special ====
Special election, 7 November 2006: Senate District 19, Unexpired term
Party	Candidate	Votes	%	±%
Democratic	Carlos Uresti	57,045	59.97	−40.03
Republican	Dick Bowen	38,070	40.03	+40.03
Majority		18,975	19.95	−80.05
Turnout		95,115		
Democratic hold				

Democratic primary, 2006: Senate District 19
Candidate		Votes	%	±
	Frank L. Madla (Incumbent)	18,936	43.48	
✓	Carlos Uresti	24,610	56.51	
Turnout		12,025		

Republican primary, 2006: Senate District 19
Candidate		Votes	%	±
✓	Dick Bowen	3,513	51.32	
	Darrel Brown	3,332	48.67	
Turnout		6,845		

=== 2002 ===
Texas general election, 2002: Senate District 19
Party	Candidate	Votes	%	±%
Democratic	Frank L. Madla (Incumbent)	76,590	100.00	0.00
Majority		76,590	100.00	+37.89
Turnout		76,590		+37.89
Democratic hold				

=== 1998 ===
Texas general election, 1998: Senate District 19
Party	Candidate	Votes	%	±%
Democratic	Frank L. Madla (Incumbent)	55,544	100.00	0.00
Majority		55,544	100.00	−8.07
Turnout		55,544		−8.07
Democratic hold				

=== 1994 ===
Texas general election, 1994: Senate District 19
Party	Candidate	Votes	%	±%
Democratic	Frank L. Madla	60,422	100.00	
Majority		60,422	100.00	
Turnout		60,422		−45.34
Democratic hold				

=== 1992 ===
Texas general election, 1992: Senate District 19
Party	Candidate	Votes	%	±%
Democratic	Gregory Luna (Incumbent)	86,742	50.94	
Republican	Ernesto Ancira	76,967	45.20	
Libertarian	James "Ted" Bonnet	6,551	3.84	
Majority		9,775	5.54	
Turnout		176,260		
Democratic hold				

== District officeholders ==
Legislature	Senator, District 19	Counties in District
1	Henry Lawrence Kinney	Goliad, Refugio, San Patricio.
2	Edward Fitzgerald; Henry Lawrence Kinney	Goliad, Nueces, Refugio, San Patricio.
3	Henry Lawrence Kinney	Goliad, Nueces, Refugio, San Patricio.
4	James Charles Wilson	Calhoun, Colorado, Jackson, Matagorda, Victoria, Wharton.
5	Charles G. Keenan	Grimes, Madison, Montgomery, Walker.
6	Jesse Grimes	Grimes, Madison, Montgomery, Walker.
7	Jesse Grimes	Grimes, Madison, Montgomery, Walker.
8	Jesse Grimes	Grimes, Madison, Montgomery, Walker.
9	John Boyd	All of Freestone, Limestone, Navarro. Portion of Ellis.
10	Thomas C. Neal; William C. Wilson; William Mynatt Peck	All of Freestone, Limestone, Navarro. Portion of Ellis.
11	John C. Yarbro	Ellis, Freestone, Limestone, Navarro.
12	Andrew J. Evans; S. W. Ford	Falls, Limestone, McLennan.
13	S. W. Ford	Falls, Limestone, McLennan.
14	George Bernard Erath	Bosque, Brown, Coleman, Comanche, Coryell, Hamilton, McLennan, Runnels.
15	Andrew Phelps McCormick	Brazoria, Galveston, Matagorda.
16	Andrew Phelps McCormick; Robert Gould Street	Brazoria, Galveston, Matagorda.
17	James B. Stubbs	Brazoria, Galveston, Matagorda.
18	Avery Lenoir Matlock	Archer, Armstrong, Bailey, Baylor, Briscoe, Carson, Castro, Childress, Clay, Cochran, Collingsworth, Cottle, Crosby, Dallam, Deaf Smith, Dickens, Donley, Floyd, Garza, Gray, Greer, Hale, Hall, Hansford, Hardeman, Hartley, Haskell, Hemphill, Hockley, Hutchinson, Kent, King, Knox, Lamb, Lipscomb, Lubbock, Lynn, Montague, Moore, Motley, Ochiltree, Oldham, Parmer, Potter, Randall, Roberts, Sherman, Stonewall, Swisher, Terry, Throckmorton, Wheeler, Wichita, Wilbarger, Yoakum, Young.
19	Temple Lea Houston	Archer, Armstrong, Bailey, Baylor, Briscoe, Carson, Castro, Childress, Clay, Cochran, Collingsworth, Cottle, Crosby, Dallam, Deaf Smith, Dickens, Donley, Floyd, Garza, Gray, Greer, Hale, Hall, Hansford, Hardeman, Hartley, Haskell, Hemphill, Hockley, Hutchinson, Kent, King, Knox, Lamb, Lipscomb, Lubbock, Lynn, Montague, Moore, Motley, Ochiltree, Oldham, Parmer, Potter, Randall, Roberts, Sherman, Stonewall, Swisher, Terry, Throckmorton, Wheeler, Wichita, Wilbarger, Yoakum, Young.
20	Temple Lea Houston	Archer, Armstrong, Bailey, Baylor, Briscoe, Carson, Castro, Childress, Clay, Cochran, Collingsworth, Cottle, Crosby, Dallam, Deaf Smith, Dickens, Donley, Floyd, Garza, Gray, Greer, Hale, Hall, Hansford, Hardeman, Hartley, Haskell, Hemphill, Hockley, Hutchinson, Kent, King, Knox, Lamb, Lipscomb, Lubbock, Lynn, Montague, Moore, Motley, Ochiltree, Oldham, Parmer, Potter, Randall, Roberts, Sherman, Stonewall, Swisher, Terry, Throckmorton, Wheeler, Wichita, Wilbarger, Yoakum, Young.
21	John Hall Stephens	Archer, Armstrong, Bailey, Baylor, Briscoe, Carson, Castro, Childress, Clay, Cochran, Collingsworth, Cottle, Crosby, Dallam, Deaf Smith, Dickens, Donley, Floyd, Garza, Gray, Greer, Hale, Hall, Hansford, Hardeman, Hartley, Haskell, Hemphill, Hockley, Hutchinson, Kent, King, Knox, Lamb, Lipscomb, Lubbock, Lynn, Montague, Moore, Motley, Ochiltree, Oldham, Parmer, Potter, Randall, Roberts, Sherman, Stonewall, Swisher, Terry, Throckmorton, Wheeler, Wichita, Wilbarger, Yoakum, Young.
22	John Hall Stephens	Archer, Armstrong, Bailey, Baylor, Briscoe, Carson, Castro, Childress, Clay, Cochran, Collingsworth, Cottle, Crosby, Dallam, Deaf Smith, Dickens, Donley, Floyd, Garza, Gray, Greer, Hale, Hall, Hansford, Hardeman, Hartley, Haskell, Hemphill, Hockley, Hutchinson, Kent, King, Knox, Lamb, Lipscomb, Lubbock, Lynn, Montague, Moore, Motley, Ochiltree, Oldham, Parmer, Potter, Randall, Roberts, Sherman, Stonewall, Swisher, Terry, Throckmorton, Wheeler, Wichita, Wilbarger, Yoakum, Young.
23	James W. Dickson	Bastrop, Burleson, Lee, Washington.
24	James W. Dickson	Bastrop, Burleson, Lee, Washington.
25	Heber Stone	Bastrop, Burleson, Lee, Washington.
26	Heber Stone	Bastrop, Burleson, Lee, Washington.
27	Sidney L. Staples	Bastrop, Burleson, Lee, Washington.
28	James M. Hale	Bastrop, Burleson, Lee, Washington.
29	James M. Hale; O. P. Storm	Bastrop, Burleson, Lee, Washington.
30	Quintus et Ultimus Watson	Bastrop, Burleson, Lee, Washington.
31	Quintus et Ultimus Watson	Bastrop, Burleson, Lee, Washington.
32	Quintus et Ultimus Watson	Bastrop, Burleson, Lee, Washington.
33	Quintus et Ultimus Watson	Bastrop, Burleson, Lee, Washington.
34	Paul D. Page	Bastrop, Burleson, Lee, Washington.
35	Paul D. Page	Bastrop, Burleson, Lee, Washington.
36	Paul D. Page	Bastrop, Burleson, Lee, Washington.
37	Paul D. Page	Bastrop, Burleson, Lee, Washington.
38	Richard S. Bowers	Bastrop, Burleson, Lee, Washington.
39	Alvin J. Wirtz	Blanco, Caldwell, Comal, Gonzales, Guadalupe, Hays.
40	Alvin J. Wirtz	Blanco, Caldwell, Comal, Gonzales, Guadalupe, Hays.
41	Alvin J. Wirtz	Blanco, Caldwell, Comal, Gonzales, Guadalupe, Hays.
42	Welly K. Hopkins	Blanco, Caldwell, Comal, Gonzales, Guadalupe, Hays.
43	Welly K. Hopkins	Blanco, Caldwell, Comal, Gonzales, Guadalupe, Hays.
44	Welly K. Hopkins; Rudolph A. Weinert	Blanco, Caldwell, Comal, Gonzales, Guadalupe, Hays.
45	Rudolph A. Weinert	Blanco, Caldwell, Comal, Gonzales, Guadalupe, Hays.
46	Rudolph A. Weinert	Blanco, Caldwell, Comal, Gonzales, Guadalupe, Hays.
47	Rudolph A. Weinert	Blanco, Caldwell, Comal, Gonzales, Guadalupe, Hays.
48	Rudolph A. Weinert	Blanco, Caldwell, Comal, Gonzales, Guadalupe, Hays.
49	Rudolph A. Weinert	Blanco, Caldwell, Comal, Gonzales, Guadalupe, Hays.
50	Rudolph A. Weinert	Blanco, Caldwell, Comal, Gonzales, Guadalupe, Hays.
51	Rudolph A. Weinert	Blanco, Caldwell, Comal, Gonzales, Guadalupe, Hays.
52	Rudolph A. Weinert	Blanco, Caldwell, Comal, Gonzales, Guadalupe, Hays.
53	Rudolph A. Weinert	Atascosa, Blanco, Caldwell, Comal, Frio, Gonzales, Guadalupe, Hays, Kendall, Medina, Wilson.
54	Rudolph A. Weinert	Atascosa, Blanco, Caldwell, Comal, Frio, Gonzales, Guadalupe, Hays, Kendall, Medina, Wilson.
55	Rudolph A. Weinert	Atascosa, Blanco, Caldwell, Comal, Frio, Gonzales, Guadalupe, Hays, Kendall, Medina, Wilson.
56	Rudolph A. Weinert	Atascosa, Blanco, Caldwell, Comal, Frio, Gonzales, Guadalupe, Hays, Kendall, Medina, Wilson.
57	Rudolph A. Weinert	Atascosa, Blanco, Caldwell, Comal, Frio, Gonzales, Guadalupe, Hays, Kendall, Medina, Wilson.
58	Walter Richter	Atascosa, Blanco, Caldwell, Comal, Frio, Gonzales, Guadalupe, Hays, Kendall, Medina, Wilson.
59	Walter Richter	Atascosa, Blanco, Caldwell, Comal, Frio, Gonzales, Guadalupe, Hays, Kendall, Medina, Wilson.
60	V. E. "Red" Berry	Portion of Bexar.
61	V. E. "Red" Berry	Portion of Bexar.
62	Glenn Kothmann	Portion of Bexar.
63	Glenn Kothmann	Portion of Bexar.
64	Glenn Kothmann	Portion of Bexar.
65	Glenn Kothmann	Portion of Bexar.
66	Glenn Kothmann	Portion of Bexar.
67	Glenn Kothmann	Portion of Bexar.
68	Glenn Kothmann	Portion of Bexar.
69	Glenn Kothmann	Portion of Bexar.
70	Frank Tejeda	Portion of Bexar.
71	Frank Tejeda	Portion of Bexar.
72	Frank Tejeda	Portion of Bexar.
73	Gregory Luna	Portion of Bexar.
74	Frank L. Madla	All of Brewster, Crockett, Edwards, Jeff Davis, Kinney, Maverick, Medina, Pecos, Presidio, Real, Terrell, Val Verde. Portions of Atascosa, Bexar, Culberson, Sutton, Uvalde.
75	Frank L. Madla	All of Brewster, Crockett, Edwards, Jeff Davis, Kinney, Maverick, Medina, Pecos, Presidio, Real, Terrell, Val Verde. Portions of Atascosa, Bexar, Culberson, Sutton, Uvalde.
76	Frank L. Madla	All of Brewster, Crockett, Edwards, Jeff Davis, Kinney, Maverick, Medina, Pecos, Presidio, Real, Terrell, Val Verde. Portions of Atascosa, Bexar, Culberson, Sutton, Uvalde.
77	Frank L. Madla	All of Brewster, Crockett, Edwards, Jeff Davis, Kinney, Maverick, Medina, Pecos, Presidio, Real, Terrell, Val Verde. Portions of Atascosa, Bexar, Culberson, Sutton, Uvalde.
78	Frank L. Madla	All of Bandera, Brewster, Crockett, Culberson, Edwards, Hudspeth, Jeff Davis, Kinney, Loving, Maverick, Medina, Pecos, Presidio, Real, Reeves, Sutton, Terrell, Uvalde, Val Verde, Ward, Winkler. Portions of Bexar, El Paso.
79	Frank L. Madla; Carlos I. Uresti	All of Bandera, Brewster, Crockett, Culberson, Edwards, Hudspeth, Jeff Davis, Kinney, Loving, Maverick, Medina, Pecos, Presidio, Real, Reeves, Sutton, Terrell, Uvalde, Val Verde, Ward, Winkler. Portions of Bexar, El Paso.
80	Carlos I. Uresti	All of Bandera, Brewster, Crockett, Culberson, Edwards, Hudspeth, Jeff Davis, Kinney, Loving, Maverick, Medina, Pecos, Presidio, Real, Reeves, Sutton, Terrell, Uvalde, Val Verde, Ward, Winkler. Portions of Bexar, El Paso.
81	Carlos I. Uresti	All of Bandera, Brewster, Crockett, Culberson, Edwards, Hudspeth, Jeff Davis, Kinney, Loving, Maverick, Medina, Pecos, Presidio, Real, Reeves, Sutton, Terrell, Uvalde, Val Verde, Ward, Winkler. Portions of Bexar, El Paso.
82	Carlos I. Uresti	All of Bandera, Brewster, Crockett, Culberson, Edwards, Hudspeth, Jeff Davis, Kinney, Loving, Maverick, Medina, Pecos, Presidio, Real, Reeves, Sutton, Terrell, Uvalde, Val Verde, Ward, Winkler. Portions of Bexar, El Paso.
83	Carlos I. Uresti	All of Brewster, Crockett, Dimmitt, Edwards, Frio, Kinney, Maverick, Medina, Pecos, Real, Reeves, Terrell, Uvalde, Val Verde, and Zavala counties. Portions of Bexar and Atascosa counties
84	Carlos I. Uresti	All of Brewster, Crockett, Dimmitt, Edwards, Frio, Kinney, Maverick, Medina, Pecos, Real, Reeves, Terrell, Uvalde, Val Verde, and Zavala counties. Portions of Bexar and Atascosa counties
85	Carlos I. Uresti; Pete Flores	All of Brewster, Crockett, Dimmitt, Edwards, Frio, Kinney, Maverick, Medina, Pecos, Real, Reeves, Terrell, Uvalde, Val Verde, and Zavala counties. Portions of Bexar and Atascosa counties
86	Pete Flores	All of Brewster, Crockett, Dimmitt, Edwards, Frio, Kinney, Maverick, Medina, Pecos, Real, Reeves, Terrell, Uvalde, Val Verde, and Zavala counties. Portions of Bexar and Atascosa counties
87	Roland Gutierrez	All of Brewster, Crockett, Dimmitt, Edwards, Frio, Kinney, Maverick, Medina, Pecos, Real, Reeves, Terrell, Uvalde, Val Verde, and Zavala counties. Portions of Bexar and Atascosa counties
89	Roland Gutierrez	All of Crockett, Edwards, Frio, Kinney, Maverick, Real, Terrell, Uvalde, Val Verde, and Zavala counties. Portions of Atascosa , Bexar, Brewster, and Guadalupe counties.
