= Carlos Uresti =

American attorney and politician

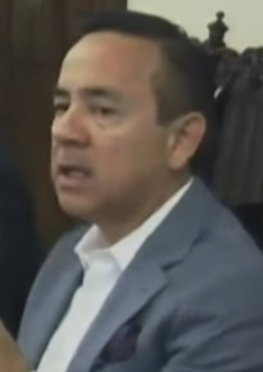

Member of the Texas Senate from the 19th district
- In office November 27, 2006 – June 21, 2018
- Preceded by: Frank L. Madla
- Succeeded by: Pete Flores

Member of the Texas House of Representatives from the 118th district
- In office June 25, 1997 – November 27, 2006
- Preceded by: Ciro Rodriguez
- Succeeded by: Joe Farias

Personal details
- Born: September 12, 1963 (age 63) San Antonio, Texas, U.S.
- Party: Democratic
- Spouse: Lleanna Uresti (m. 2012)
- Children: 2
- Education: St. Mary's University, Texas (BA, JD)
- Website: Campaign website

Military service
- Allegiance: United States
- Branch/service: United States Marine Corps
- Rank: Captain
- Unit: Reserves

Carlos "Charlie" Uresti (born September 18, 1963) is an American attorney and Democratic politician from San Antonio, Texas. From November 2006 until his resignation in June 2018, he served as a member of the Texas State Senate representing Senate District 19, one of the largest geographical senatorial districts in the Texas Senate, covering a third of the Texas-Mexico border. Prior to his election to the Texas State Senate, he represented the 118th district in the Texas House of Representatives from January 1997 until November 2006.

In February 2018, Uresti was found guilty of 11 federal felony charges relating to his alleged involvement in a Ponzi scheme that defrauded investors out of hundreds of thousands of dollars. On June 18, 2018, he announced his resignation from the Texas State Senate, effective June 21, 2018. On June 26, 2018, Uresti was sentenced to 12 years in federal prison. He surrendered to U.S. marshals on February 19, 2019. In March 2023, Uresti's sentence was reduced. In June 2023, Uresti was released from federal prison and will be in a halfway house until December 2024.

== Early life and family ==
Carlos Uresti was born in San Antonio on September 18, 1963, the youngest of eight children. He grew up on the south side of San Antonio and attended McCollum High School, where he was a part of the JROTC. After graduation, Uresti enlisted in the U.S. Marine Corps Reserves at the age of 18. In 1985, he earned his bachelor's degree in political science from St. Mary's University, and was then commissioned as a second lieutenant. Uresti rose to the rank of captain and earned the Navy Achievement Medal during his four years of active duty as a combat engineer. After his military career, Uresti returned to St. Mary's University School of Law, from which he graduated in 1992. Since then, he has been in private practice in San Antonio, with the Uresti Law Firm.

Uresti married Lleanna Elizondo in 2012. She has two children, Katalina and Sebastian, and he has two sons: Michael, a 2005 graduate of Texas A&M University, and Carlos Jr., who is a 2011 Texas A&M University-San Antonio graduate and a corporal in the United States Marine Corps Reserve.

Two of his brothers are also involved in San Antonio politics: Albert Uresti ran unsuccessfully for US Congress in 2006 and was elected tax assessor-collector of Bexar County in 2012, and Tomas Uresti was a member of the Texas House of Representatives in District 118 (2016-2018). His niece Lisa Uresti-Dasher, daughter of his brother Albert, ran an unsuccessful campaign for judge of the Texas 285th District Court, on the ballot in the 2022 Democratic primary.

== Political career ==
Uresti entered state politics during the 1997 special election for Texas House District 118. During his nine-year career in the House, he chaired the Committee on Human Services during the 78th Legislature and the Committee on Government Reform during the 79th Legislature. Uresti was elected to the Texas State Senate in 2006 representing Senate District 19, after challenging 13-year incumbent Frank Madla in a contentious and sometimes heated primary election. Democratic activists were critical of Senator Madla for being too closely tied to the Republican leadership in the Senate and unwilling to use senatorial power to prevent the passage of Republican bills. Specifically, Uresti scrutinized Madla's role in a 2003 vote to remove 180,000 youngsters from the Children's Health Insurance Program. Madla controversially referred to Uresti's charge as a "procedural matter". Eventually, Uresti prevailed with 56.5% of the vote to Madla's 43.5%, and Senator Madla resigned effective May 31, 2006. For his second term, Uresti faced an unexpectedly difficult re-election in 2010, winning by less than 9,000 votes. The senator attributed this to inadequate voter outreach in rural and exurban counties. In 2012, Uresti won by a significantly wider 19-point margin.

=== Federal investigation and prosecution ===
On February 16, 2017, FBI and IRS agents raided Uresti's law offices in connection with the investigation into FourWinds, a fraudulent fracking business. Uresti released a statement shortly after stating that he would fully cooperate with agents during their investigation.

Targeted in the raid was Uresti's consulting company, Turning Point Strategies; the FBI was investigating "investors or contributors" in the company, which collected Uresti's commissions for handling a former client's $900,000 investment with FourWinds. The client, Denise Cantu (born 1980) of Harlingen, lost much of the money that she obtained from a case involving the wrongful death of two of her children. Uresti subsequently acquired a $25,000 loan from Cantu and borrowed $75,000 from three other individuals, including one of his senate staff members.

Cantu separately filed a civil suit against Uresti, alleging fraud after she invested heavily in the failed FourWinds Logistics. Cantu claims that Uresti "tricked" her with the investment and did not disclose that he received a $27,000 commission from FourWinds for successfully soliciting her business. Cantu claims that FourWinds divided her money among the company officers and did not purchase fracking sand as they had promised. Uresti denied any wrongdoing and asked that the suit be delayed until after the legislature adjourned at the end of May.

On May 16, 2017, Uresti was indicted on two separate indictments by a federal grand jury in the United States District Court for the Western District of Texas for conspiracy to commit wire fraud and conspiracy to commit money laundering. The other indictment lists conspiracy to commit bribery and conspiracy to commit money laundering. Uresti is alleged to have taken money from Physicians Network Associates (PNA), which had a contract for medical services as the Reeves County Detention Center, a scheme which continued through PNA's successor companies. The indictment claims acting Reeves County administrator, Judge Jimmy Galindo, conspired to approve the medical contract through the county commissioners court in exchange for kickbacks and "promises of future payments." PNA hired Uresti, ostensibly as a "consultant" for "marketing services." The prosecution claims that in fact Uresti became the middleman for bribe money destined for Galindo. PNA was subsequently absorbed by Correctional Healthcare Companies in 2010, which then merged with another provider, Correct Care Solutions, in 2014. PNA and its successor corporations continued to pay Uresti $10,000 monthly, starting in September 2006 for the next 10 years. Uresti is alleged to have pocketed about half of those bribes, giving Galindo the balance.

On May 20, 2017, the San Antonio Express-News called on Uresti to resign.

In a court filing, the federal prosecutors assert that because of overwhelming personal financial woes, Uresti carried out a "Ponzi scheme" that defrauded Cantu (cited as Victim 1).

U.S. Magistrate Judge Henry Joseph Bemporad ruled on June 30 that Uresti's attorney, Mikal Watts, has a conflict of interest in the case, but did not immediately remove Watts from representing Uresti. Bemporad said that the case against Uresti is tied to the wrongful death case that Watts' legal firm conducted on behalf of Denise Cantu.

Uresti's federal jury trial on 11 charges, which included money laundering, wire fraud, and securities fraud, concluded with 11 guilty verdicts. He then resigned from the Texas Senate.

In June 2018, Uresti was sentenced to 12 years in prison, to be followed by three years of supervised release. He was ordered to pay restitution to his victims in the amount of $6.3 million.

=== Sexual harassment allegations ===
In December 2017, The Daily Beast published an article containing numerous sexual-harassment allegations against Uresti. After the publication of the article, Democratic State Senator Sylvia Garcia called for an investigation into the allegations. The reports mostly were attributed to anonymous sources. Annie's List, an organization that advocates for the election of Democratic women in Texas, has urged Uresti to resign following reports of sexual misconduct. The Daily Beast claimed that an unidentified female staffer was reportedly sitting on Uresti's lap on the first day of the 2013 session.

Uresti claimed she was his wife and produced a picture of the couple sitting together at the event.

== Political positions ==
=== Transportation ===
Uresti has advocated for increased state investment in transportation infrastructure. He was a vocal critic of the TxDOT plan to replace heavily trafficked county roads with gravel.

=== Child Protective Services advocacy ===
Uresti has been a proponent of reform within the Child Protective Services (CPS), saying it needs to be better funded and needs reformed management practices, lower caseloads per worker, and higher salaries. He has pushed for more resources to be put towards abuse prevention.

During the 84th Legislative Session, Uresti pushed for increased funding for CPS to hire more caseworkers to reduce workloads. In a 2016 interim hearing, Senator Uresti advocated for better pay for CPS caseworkers, to decrease turnover and training costs.

=== Water ===
Uresti was a proponent of Proposition 6, which provided $2 billion from the Rainy Day Fund to the State Water Plan, allowing low-interest loans for more than 560 water-supply projects, saying that Texas needed to "take a progressive and forward-looking approach to our long-term water needs."

== Election history ==
Uresti had served in the Texas State Senate since 2006, having previously served in the Texas House of Representatives since 1997.

=== 2016 ===
Texas general election, 2016: Senate District 19
Party	Candidate	Votes	%	±%
Republican	Pete Flores	97,682	40.43	
Democratic	Carlos Uresti	134,997	55.87	
Libertarian	Maximilian Martin	8,948	3.70	
Turnout		241,627		
Democratic hold				

Democratic primary, 2016: Senate District 19
Candidate		Votes	%	±
	Helen Madla	13,627	25.44	
✓	Carlos “Charlie” Uresti	39,931	74.56	

=== 2012 ===
Texas general election, 2012: Senate District 19
Party	Candidate	Votes	%	±%
Republican	Michael Berlanga	83,522	40.59	
Democratic	Carlos Uresti	122,214	59.40	
Turnout		205,736		
Democratic hold				

=== 2010 ===
Texas general election, 2010: Senate District 19
Party	Candidate	Votes	%	±%
Republican	Dick Bowen	53,024	45.08	
Democratic	Carlos Uresti	61,327	52.13	
Libertarian	Mette A. Baker	3,269	2.77	
Turnout		117,620		
Democratic hold				

Democratic primary, 2010: Senate District 19
Candidate		Votes	%	±
✓	Carlos Uresti (Incumbent)	25,969	76.16	
	Luis Juarez Jr.	8,125	23.83	
Turnout		34,094	100.00	

=== 2006 ===
Texas general election, 2006: Senate District 19
Party	Candidate	Votes	%	±%
Republican	Dick Bowen	40,556	40.82	
Democratic	Carlos Uresti	58,793	59.18	
Majority		18,237	18.36	
Turnout		99,349		
Democratic hold				

Special election: Senate District 19, Unexpired term November 7, 2006
Party	Candidate	Votes	%	±%
Republican	Dick Bowen	39,312	40.64	
Democratic	Carlos Uresti	57,426	59.36	
Majority		18,237	18.72	
Turnout		96,738		
Democratic hold				

Democratic primary, 2006: Senate District 19
Candidate		Votes	%	±
	Frank L. Madla (Incumbent)	18,936	43.48	
✓	Carlos Uresti	24,610	56.51	
Turnout		12,025		

Two elections were held on November 7, 2006, due to Senator Frank Madla's resignation following his loss in the primary. Senator Uresti was sworn into the senate in November rather than January because of his victory in the special election.

=== 2004 ===
Texas general election, 2004: House District 118
Party	Candidate	Votes	%	±%
Republican	Steve Salyer	16,183	43.21	
Democratic	Carlos “Charlie” Uresti	21,265	56.79	
Majority		5,082	13.57	
Turnout		37,448		
Democratic hold				

=== 2002 ===
Texas general election, 2002: House District 118
Party	Candidate	Votes	%	±%
Democratic	Carlos “Charlie” Uresti	14,416	100.00	
Majority		14,416	100.00	
Turnout		14,416		
Democratic hold				

=== 2000 ===
Texas general election, 2000: House District 118
Party	Candidate	Votes	%	±%
Democratic	Carlos “Charlie” Uresti	19,748	100.00	
Majority		19,748	100.00	
Turnout		19,748		
Democratic hold				

=== 1998 ===
Texas general election, 1998: House District 118
Party	Candidate	Votes	%	±%
Democratic	Carlos “Charlie” Uresti	9,878	100.00	
Majority		9,878	100.00	
Turnout		9,878		
Democratic hold				

Democratic primary, 1998: House District 118
Candidate		Votes	%	±
	Sylvia Ruiz-Mendelsohn	1,403	34.80	
✓	Carlos "Charlie" Uresti	2,629	65.20	
Turnout		4,032		

=== 1997 ===
Special election runoff, House District 118 – Unexpired term June 21, 1997
Party	Candidate	Votes	%	±%
Democratic	Sylvia Ruiz-Mendelsohn	1,557	35.69	
Democratic	Carlos “Charlie” Uresti	2,805	64.31	
Turnout		4,362		
Democratic hold				

Special election, House District 118 – Unexpired term May 30, 1997
Party	Candidate	Votes	%	±%
Democratic	Sylvia Ruiz-Mendelsohn	1,605	29.25	
Republican	Charley “Injun” Sanford	273	4.97	
Democratic	Davis Sosa	1,085	19.77	
Democratic	Carlos “Charlie” Uresti	2,525	46.01	
Turnout		4,362		

Texas House of Representatives
Preceded by Ciro D. Rodriguez	Member of the Texas House of Representatives from District 118 (San Antonio); 1997–2006	Succeeded by Joe Farias
Texas Senate
Preceded by Frank L. Madla	Texas State Senator from District 19 (San Antonio); 2006–2018	Succeeded by Pete Flores
