= Tomas Uresti =

American politician

Member of the Texas House of Representatives from the 118th district
- In office January 10, 2017 – January 8, 2019
- Preceded by: John Lujan
- Succeeded by: Leo Pacheco

Personal details
- Party: Democratic
- Spouse: Leslie Marie Uresti
- Website: Tomas Uresti for State Rep

Tomas Uresti is a Democratic former member of the Texas House of Representatives who represented District 118. He won the November 2016 general election and was sworn into office on January 10, 2017. Uresti was defeated in the Democratic primary on March 6, 2018.

== Biography ==
Uresti served 13 years on the Harlandale ISD Board of Trustees and four years on the board of directors for the Bexar County Appraisal District before winning election as a state Representative in 2016. He lost his bid for re-election in the March 6, 2018 Democratic primary to Leo Pacheco, an adjunct professor at San Antonio College and former chair of the Bexar County Democratic Party. Uresti's loss was attributed in part to blowback from the conviction of his younger brother, former State Senator Carlos Uresti, on multiple counts of fraud and money laundering shortly before the primary.

In 2021, Uresti ran for the San Antonio City Council, but was defeated in the June 5 primary by Phyllis Viagran.

== Legislative career ==
During the 2017 legislative session, Uresti was the House sponsor of Senate Bill 436, requiring Texas's Special Education Continuing Advisory Committee to comply with the Texas Open Meetings Act. The bill became law on September 1, 2017. Later that year, Uresti helped facilitate the sale of the notorious "Safe Tire" dump in San Antonio, a long-standing hazardous waste site, to Copart, Inc., an international, online vehicle-auction company, which committed to cleaning up the site as part of the deal.
