= 2026 Texas elections =

- November 3, 2026

Elections were held in Texas on November 3, 2026. Primary elections took place on March 3, and runoffs took place on May 26 for primary candidates who did not receive a majority of the vote. Early voting in the primary ran from February 17 to February 27, and early voting in the runoff ran from May 18 to May 22.

All of the state's executive offices were up for election, as well as 16 seats of the Texas Senate, all seats of the Texas House of Representatives, 8 seats on the Texas State Board of Education, 4 seats on the Supreme Court of Texas, 3 seats on the Texas Court of Criminal Appeals, all 3 seats on the statewide Fifteenth Court of Appeals, all 38 seats in the United States House of Representatives, and one of the state's United States Senate seats.

In the primaries, Democratic Party voters outnumbered Republican Party voters for the first time since the 2020 primaries.

In the general elections, Democrats swept the U.S. Senate race and all 17 statewide executive and judicial offices on the ballot in an upset, winning every race by wide margins in what was described as a "remake in Texas politics" and a "mandate for change". These elections were the first time Democrats won any statewide office in Texas since 1994, as well as the first time since the era of Jim Crow, when Texas elections were almost exclusively open to White Americans, and when the whole of the former Confederacy was united under effective one-party Democratic rule for decades in the Solid South. The party also won narrow majorities in the Texas House of Representatives, its first since 2000, and on the Texas State Board of Education, its first since 1994. However, it did not flip any seats in the Texas Senate. Ted Cruz remains the sole Republican elected statewide in Texas, which has led people to speculate he may prefer to run for President in 2028 instead of a Senate run in 2030.

The results of this election are colloquially known as Blexas (Blue Texas).

== Federal ==
=== United States Senate ===
Incumbent Republican U.S. Senator John Cornyn ran for re-election. He faced attorney general Ken Paxton in a runoff on May 26 after neither gained an overall majority in the first-round primary. After an endorsement from U.S. President Donald Trump, Paxton won the runoff with 63% of the vote and secured the Republican nomination. U.S. representative Wesley Hunt came third in the primary.

Ken Paxton faced Democratic nominee James Talarico, who won his primary against U.S. representative Jasmine Crockett. James Talarico won the election.

=== United States House of Representatives ===
All 38 seats are up for election. Congressional districts were redrawn in 2025 by the state legislature in a move seen as beneficial for Republicans. The move backfired, however, as the maps that were drawn to net the GOP up to five seats, ended up losing one as Democrat Leticia Gutierrez upset Republican Alex Mealer in the 9th district 57.6% to 42.4%. Republicans will have a 24-14 seat advantage in the state house delegation in the 120th congress.

== Executive ==
=== Governor ===
Incumbent Republican governor Greg Abbott ran for re-election to a fourth term. He was previously re-elected in 2022 with 54.76% of the vote. Abbott faced Democratic nominee state representative Gina Hinojosa. Abbott was defeated by Hinojosa, and on the night of November 3, conceded the race.

=== Lieutenant governor ===
Incumbent Republican lieutenant governor Dan Patrick ran for re-election to a fourth term. He was re-elected in 2022 with 53.75% of the vote. Patrick lost to Democratic nominee state representative Vikki Goodwin.

=== Attorney general ===
Incumbent Republican attorney general Ken Paxton ran for U.S. senate. He was re-elected in 2022 with 53.42% of the vote.

The race featured competitive primaries in which neither the Republican and Democrats primary elections resulted in a candidate receiving a majority vote and necessitated a runoff. Declared candidates in the Republican primary included state senators Joan Huffman and Mayes Middleton, former U.S. Assistant Attorney General for the Office of Legal Policy Aaron Reitz, and U.S. representative Chip Roy. Middleton and Roy advanced to the runoff, and Middleton ultimately secured the nomination.

Declared candidates in the Democratic primary included attorney Tony Box, former mayor of Galveston Joe Jaworski, and state senator Nathan Johnson. Jaworski and Johnson advanced to the runoff, and Johnson won the nomination. Johnson won the election.

=== Comptroller of Public Accounts ===
Incumbent Republican comptroller Glenn Hegar was re-elected in 2022 with 56.39% of the vote. He resigned on July 1, 2025 to become chancellor of the Texas A&M University System, and he was succeeded by his chief clerk, former state senator Kelly Hancock, as acting comptroller, who ran for re-election.

Hancock faced Texas Railroad Commission member Christi Craddick and former state senator Don Huffines in the Republican primary. On March 3, 2026, Huffines won the Republican primary with 57% win. Huffines faced the Democratic nominee state senator Sarah Eckhardt in the general election. Eckhardt won the election.

=== Commissioner of the General Land Office ===
Incumbent Republican Land Commissioner Dawn Buckingham ran for re-election to a second four-year term. She was first elected in 2022 with 56.2% of the vote. Buckingham faced the Democratic nominee and Bay City councilor Benjamin Flores. Flores won the election.

=== Commissioner of Agriculture ===
Incumbent Republican Agriculture Commissioner Sid Miller ran for re-election to a fourth four-year term. He was re-elected in 2022 with 56.4% of the vote. Miller, who received a late endorsement from U.S. President Donald Trump, lost to Nathan Sheets, who was backed by Texas Governor Greg Abbott, 52% to 47%. It marked the first time in years that a statewide Republican official lost renomination in a primary. Sheets lost to Democratic nominee Clayton Tucker in the general election.

=== Railroad Commission ===
Incumbent Republican Railroad Commission of Texas member Jim Wright ran for re-election to a second six-year term. He was first elected in 2020 with 53% of the vote. Wright faced multiple primary opponents and went to runoff election against former Tarrant County Republican Party chairman Bo French. French narrowly won the runoff 50.6% to 49.4%. French faced state representative Jon Rosenthal in the general election. Rosenthal won the election.

== Judicial ==
=== Texas Court of Criminal Appeals ===
==== Place 3 ====
===== Republican primary =====
====== Nominee ======
- Tom Smith, assistant attorney general in the Texas Attorney General’s Office

====== Eliminated in runoff ======
- Alison Fox, staff attorney of the Texas Court of Criminal Appeals

====== Eliminated in primary ======
- Brent Coffee, assistant attorney general in the Texas Attorney General’s Office
- Lesli Fitzpatrick, director of special litigation for the Texas Department of Criminal Justice’s Office of General Counsel

===== Democratic primary =====
====== Nominee ======
- Okey Anyiam, criminal defense attorney

===== Libertarian convention =====
====== Nominee ======
- Mark Ash, criminal defense lawyer and nominee for Attorney General in 2022

=== Post-primary endorsements ===
Okey Anyiam (D)

Newspapers

- The Dallas Morning News
- Houston Chronicle
- San Antonio Express-News

==== Place 4 ====
===== Republican primary =====
====== Nominee ======
- Kevin Yeary, incumbent

===== Democratic primary =====
====== Nominee ======
- Audra Riley, judge of the Criminal District Court No. 3 in Dallas County

=== Post-primary endorsements ===
Kevin Yeary (R)

Newspapers

- The Dallas Morning News
- Houston Chronicle
- San Antonio Express-News

==== Place 9 ====
===== Republican primary =====
====== Nominee ======
- John Messinger, assistant state prosecuting attorney

====== Eliminated in primary ======
- Jennifer Balido, judge of the Criminal District Court No. 1 in Dallas County

===== Democratic primary =====
====== Nominee ======
- Holly Taylor, criminal and civil appeals attorney

=== Post-primary endorsements ===
Holly Taylor (D)

Newspapers

- The Dallas Morning News
- Houston Chronicle
- San Antonio Express-News

== Legislature ==
16 seats of the Texas Senate and all 150 seats of the Texas House of Representatives are up for election. The winners of this election will serve in the 90th Texas Legislature.

=== Polling ===
Poll source	Date(s) administered	Sample size (Note: Key: A – all adults RV – registered voters LV – likely voters V – unclear)	Margin of error	Republican	Democratic	Other	Undecided
University of Texas/Texas Politics Project	September 25 – October 5, 2026	861 (LV)	± 3.3%	48%	43%	2%	8%

=== Senate ===
In the Texas Senate, 16 of the 31 seats are up for election to four-year terms. The seats up for election in the cycle were determined after the redistricting triggered by the 2020 census through the drawing of lots. Before the election, Republicans held a majority of 19 seats against the Democrats' 12 seats.

Texas Senate
Party	Leader	Before	After	Change
Republican	Charles Perry	19	19	Steady
Democratic	Carol Alvarado	12	12	Steady
Total		31	31	Steady

=== House of Representatives ===
All 150 seats of the Texas House of Representatives are up for election to two-year terms. Prior to the election, Republicans held a majority of 88 seats against the Democrats' 62 seats.

Texas House of Representatives
Party	Leader	Before	After	Change
Republican	Dustin Burrows	88	63	▼21
Democratic	Gene Wu	62	78	▲21
Total		150		

== Local elections ==
In Texas, county elections are partisan and were held at the same time as national and state races.

Local elections are officially non-partisan and were held on the first Saturday of May. These elections featured races for city council members, school board members, and local bond elections. In addition, three city members of DART held elections to withdraw: Addison, Highland Park, and University Park; only Highland Park voted to withdraw.

=== County elections ===
- 2026 Bexar County elections
  - 2026 Bexar County District Attorney election
  - 2026 Bexar County Judge election
- 2026 Collin County Judge election
- 2026 Dallas County elections
- 2026 Harris County elections
  - 2026 Harris County Judge election
  - 2026 Harris County Board of Commissioners election
- 2026 Fort Bend County Judge election
- 2026 Tarrant County elections
  - 2026 Tarrant County Judge election

=== Local Mayoral elections ===
==== Eligible incumbents ====
- Arlington, Texas: Two-term incumbent Jim Ross is eligible for re-election.
- Laredo, Texas: One-term incumbent Victor Treviño is eligible for re-election.
- Lubbock, Texas: One-term incumbent Mark McBrayer is eligible for re-election.

==== Ineligible or retiring incumbents ====
- Corpus Christi, Texas: Two-term incumbent Paulette Guajardo is term-limited and ineligible to run.
- Irving, Texas: Three-term incumbent Rick Stopfer is term-limited and ineligible to run.

== Election administration ==
In October 2026, voting rights groups filed two lawsuits against the Texas Secretary of State and the Texas Department of Public Safety over delays in transmitting hundreds of thousands of online voter registration applications to county officials; the Secretary of State's office said the backlog had been cleared. On October 27, the Potter County Republican Party filed a federal lawsuit seeking to block certification of the general election results until every paper ballot in the state is hand counted; the plaintiffs did not allege that any previous election had been altered.
