= Cannabis in Texas =

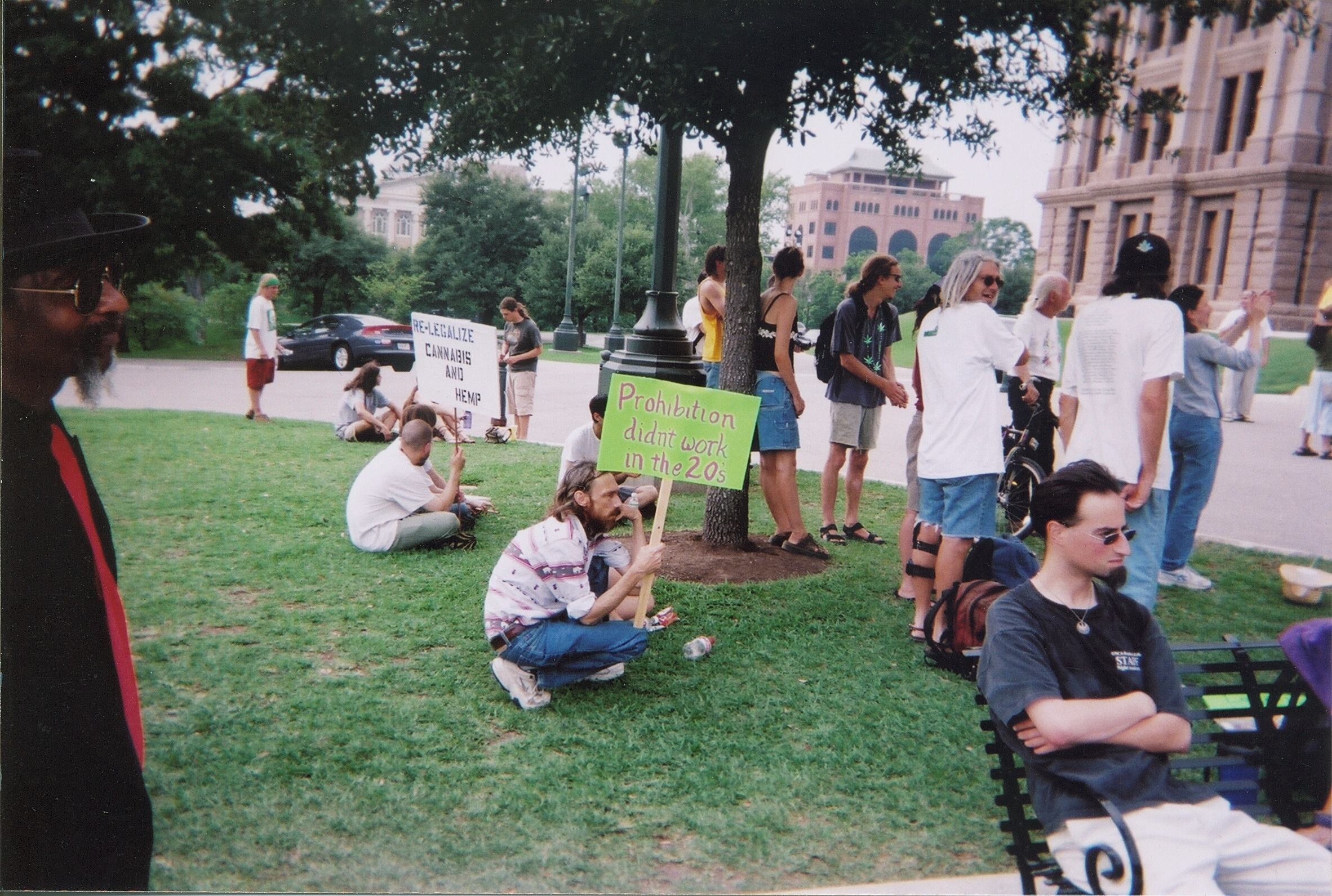
2012 pro-cannabis protest in Austin

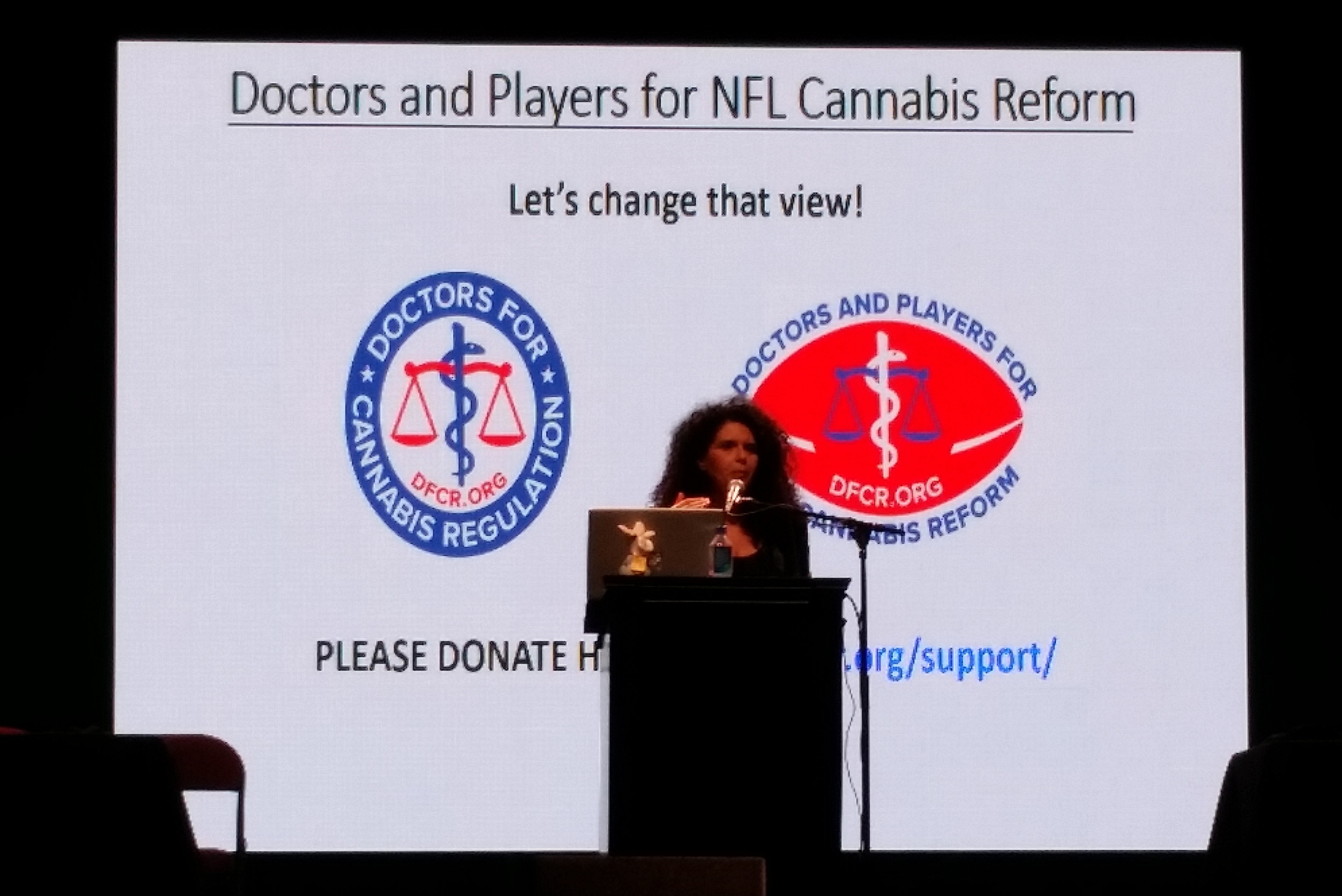
The 2017 Houston, Texas Cannabidiol Superbowl Conference. A panel of scientists, along with 7 ex-NFL players presented a case for using CBD products.

Cannabis in Texas is illegal for recreational use. Possession of up to two ounces is a class B misdemeanor, punishable by up to 180 days in prison and a fine of up to $2000. In May 2025, the Texas Legislature passed Senate Bill 3, a law banning the sale and possession of hemp-derived products containing any amount of THC, effectively criminalizing much of the state’s legal hemp industry starting September 1. As of June 22, Governor Greg Abbott has decided to veto the bill, calling for regulation instead of a full prohibition. A special session was held on July 21 to discuss the matter.

Medical use is allowed only in the form of low-THC cannabis oil, less than 1% THC with a doctor's approval and less than 0.3% THC without. Legislation allowing for medical use was first approved in 2015.

Prior to 1973, Texas had the harshest cannabis laws of any state in the nation, with possession of any amount classified as a felony offense punishable by two years to life in prison. Possession was banned statewide in 1931.

== History ==
=== Early history ===
John Gregory Bourke described the use of "mariguan", which he identifies as Cannabis indica or Indian hemp, by Mexican residents of the Rio Grande region of Texas in 1894. He described its uses for treating asthma, expediting delivery, warding off witches, and as a love-philtre. He also wrote that many Mexicans added the herb to their cigarritos or mescal, often taking a bite of sugar afterward to intensify the effect. Bourke wrote that because it was often used in a mixture with toloachi (which he inaccurately describes as Datura stramonium), mariguan was one of the several plants known as "loco weed". Bourke compared mariguan to hasheesh, which he called "one of the greatest curses of the East", citing reports that users "become maniacs and are apt to commit all sorts of acts of violence and murder", causing degeneration of the body and an idiotic appearance, and mentioned laws against sale of hasheesh "in most Eastern countries".

=== 1915 El Paso ban ===
The Texas city of El Paso was the first American city to individually restrict cannabis in 1915. The scene for this city ban was set in 1913, when a man killed a police officer in neighboring Ciudad Juárez, Mexico, while chasing an El Paso couple. Chief Deputy Stanley Good of the El Paso Sheriff's Department noted over several media statements:

One under its influence is devoid of fear and as reckless of consequences or results. There are instances where the drug crazed victim has been placed in jail, but in many cases officers have been compelled to slay the fiend in order to save their own lives. ... A large percentage of the crimes committed are by men saturated with the drug... Most Mexicans in this section are addicted to the habit, and it is a growing habit among Americans.

=== 1919 Sale restricted ===
In 1919, legislation was enacted to prohibit the transfer of narcotics, including cannabis, for non-medical use. Transfer of cannabis in this manner was made a misdemeanor crime; however, possession of the drug still remained legal.

=== 1923 Further restrictions ===
In 1923, legislation was enacted to prohibit the possession of narcotics, including cannabis, with intent to sell. As a result of this law, cannabis could no longer be purchased over-the-counter at pharmacies (only by prescription).

=== 1931 Prohibition ===
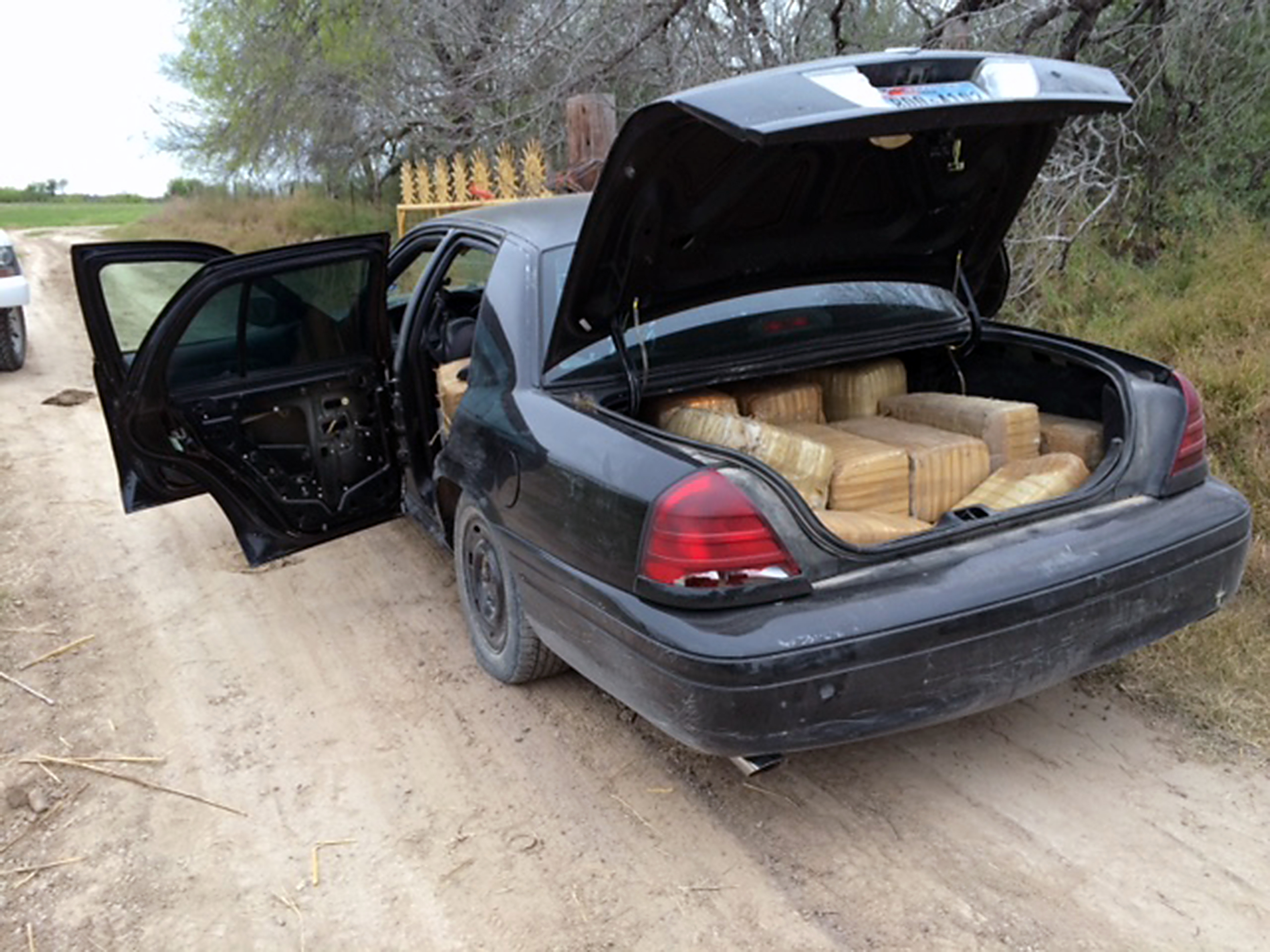
2015 Border Patrol seizure of cannabis in the Rio Grande Valley

Possession of cannabis was banned statewide in 1931, making it a felony. Until 1973, it would remain classified as a narcotic with the possibility of life sentences imposed for possession of small amounts.

== Reforms ==
=== State level ===
==== House Bill 447 (1973) ====
In June 1973, House Bill 447 was signed into law to significantly reduce penalties for cannabis offenses. Prior to its passage, Texas had the harshest cannabis laws of any state in the nation, with possession of any amount classified as a felony offense punishable by two years to life in prison. With the passage of the bill, possession of up to two ounces was reduced to a class B misdemeanor, punishable by a $1000 fine and a prison sentence of no more than 180 days. The bill passed the Senate by a 24–7 vote and the House 84–58.

House Bill 447 also contained a provision allowing persons serving time for cannabis offenses to be resentenced under the new law. The resentencing provision was later ruled unconstitutional; however, by May 1974, Governor Dolph Briscoe had granted clemency to 95 of these prisoners.

==== House Bill 2391 (2007) ====
In June 2007, House Bill 2391 was signed into law by Governor Rick Perry. Under the law, police can "cite and release" for certain misdemeanor crimes instead of subjecting offenders to immediate arrest (though the same penalties still apply). Among the offenses for which a citation can be issued is possession of up to 4 ounces of cannabis. Many police departments announced they would continue to arrest for minor cannabis offenses, however.

==== Proposed recreational legalization (2015) ====
In 2015, State Representative David Simpson introduced House Bill 2165 to legalize the use of cannabis for recreational purposes. A Tea Party-backed conservative, Simpson made a religious case for cannabis, stating: "I don't believe that when God made marijuana, he made a mistake that government needs to fix." In May 2015, Simpson's bill gained a majority of support in the House Criminal Jurisprudence Committee, but was not accepted to make it further on the House floor in the limited time remaining in the legislative session.

==== Limited medical use legalized (2015) ====
In June 2015, Governor Greg Abbott signed Senate Bill 339 – the Texas Compassionate Use Act – to allow the use of low-THC cannabis oil (less than 0.5% THC) for the treatment of epilepsy. Abbott caveated his support: "I remain convinced that Texas should not legalize marijuana, nor should Texas open the door for conventional marijuana to be used for medicinal purposes." The bill passed by a 26–5 vote in the Senate and 96–34 in the House.

==== House approves reduced penalties (2019) ====
In April 2019, the House of Representatives voted 98–43 to approve House Bill 63. It sought to make possession of up to one ounce of cannabis a Class C (rather than a Class B) misdemeanor, eliminate the threat of jail time, and reduce the fine to $500. The day after its passage in the House, however, Lieutenant Governor Dan Patrick announced that he would not allow a vote on it in the Senate.

==== Legalization of hemp cultivation and delta-8-THC (2019) ====
In June 2019, House Bill 1325 was signed into law by Governor Abbott to legalize the cultivation of industrial hemp (cannabis containing less than 0.3% THC). It also legalized possession and sale of hemp-derived CBD products without the need for a doctor's approval. HB 1325 passed the Senate 31–0 and the House 140–3.

The enactment of HB 1325 also caused an outcome that legislators did not intend. Because it changed the legal definition of marijuana from cannabis in general to cannabis containing greater than 0.3% THC, many marijuana possession charges across the state were soon dropped due to a shortage of THC testing equipment available. Prosecutors in the counties of Harris, Tarrant, Bexar, Travis, Williamson, and several others soon announced the dismissal of hundreds of marijuana cases and a moratorium on pursuing new charges.

The enactment of HB 1325 also caused the psychoactive cannabinoid delta-8-THC to become legal when produced from legally cultivated hemp. The Texas Department of State Health Services later classified the drug as an illegal substance in October 2021, but a November 2021 injunction from a district court judge prevented the prohibition from taking effect until a final ruling on the matter can be made.

==== Qualifying conditions expanded (2019) ====
In June 2019, Governor Abbott signed House Bill 3703, which increased the number of qualifying conditions eligible for treatment under the state's low-THC medical cannabis program. Previously limited to epilepsy only, the bill added terminal cancer, autism, multiple sclerosis, amyotrophic lateral sclerosis (ALS), seizure disorders, and incurable neurological disorders such as Alzheimer's, Parkinson's, and Huntington's Disease.

==== Smokable hemp banned (2020) ====
In 2020, Texas regulators issued a ban on the manufacture, processing, distribution, and sale of hemp for smoking purposes only. In response, local companies protested the ban and filed a lawsuit seeking to have it overturned. In September 2020, Travis County District Judge Lora Livingston granted a temporary injunction lifting the ban until the case went to trial in 2021. The ban was ruled unconstitutional by Judge Livingston in August 2021; however, in June 2022, the Texas Supreme Court upheld the ban on the manufacturing and processing (but not sale) of smokable hemp.

==== "Smoke a joint, lose your license" repealed (2021) ====
In May 2021, SCR 1 was signed by Governor Abbott to declare that Texas had formally opted out of the requirements of the Solomon–Lautenberg amendment. In June 2021, SB 181 was signed to eliminate a requirement in state law that any drug conviction be penalized with a six-month driver's license suspension, instead allowing judges to waive suspensions for misdemeanor offenders who do not have a drug conviction in the prior 36 months. SB 181 took effect on September 1, 2021.

==== Medical program expansion (2021) ====
In June 2021, HB 1535 was signed into law to raise the THC limit from 0.5% to 1% and expand coverage to include all forms of cancer and post-traumatic stress disorder (PTSD), effective September 1. A version of the bill that passed the House allowed for a 5% THC limit, but it was lowered to 1% in the Senate.

==== House approves medical program expansion (2023) ====
House Bill 1805 that would expand covered medical conditions and define a per-dose THC limit instead of a percentage limit was passed by the House of Representatives on April 11, 2023.

==== House approves reduced penalties (2023) ====
On April 27, 2023, the House of Representatives passed HB 218 by a 87–59 vote. The bill would make possession of up to one ounce of marijuana a Class C misdemeanor with a maximum fine of $500 and no jail time.

==== Texas’s Compassionate Use Program expansion (2025) ====
In 2025, Texas expanded its medical marijuana program that begin in 2015, through House Bill 46, significantly increasing both access and flexibility within the state’s Compassionate Use Program.The law broadened eligibility by adding more qualifying medical conditions such as chronic pain, Crohn’s disease, and traumatic brain injuries. It also expanded the types of cannabis products patients can use, moving beyond oils and edibles to include options like patches, lotions, inhalers, and certain vaporized forms, giving patients more personalized treatment choices.The expansion also focused heavily on improving access across Texas. The state required the Texas Department of Public Safety to issue more licenses to cannabis providers, increasing competition and availability. In addition, providers were allowed to open satellite distribution locations instead of operating from a single central site, making it easier for patients to obtain their medication without traveling long distances. As a result of these changes, the program saw rapid growth, with over 135,000 registered patients by the end of 2025. The increase in providers and distribution sites helped lower costs and speed up delivery times, improving overall efficiency. While these updates brought Texas closer to a more modern medical cannabis system, the program still remains more restrictive than those in many other states, particularly in terms of product potency and broader access.

==== Texas rule changes (2026) ====
On November 12, 2026, a new federal law will take effect that changes how hemp is legally defined. Instead of only limiting delta-9 THC to 0.3%, the law will apply that limit to “total THC,” meaning all forms of THC combined (including compounds like THCA and delta-8). This is important because many products currently sold as legal hemp actually rely on a loophole where only delta-9 THC is measured. At the state level, Texas is already making changes before the federal law even takes effect. Beginning March 31, 2026, new rules from the Texas Department of State Health Services will ban smokable hemp products, including hemp flower and pre-rolled joints. These rules also change how THC is calculated by including THCA, which makes many existing products no longer legal. This means that even before the federal law starts, Texas will remove many popular hemp products from stores. The Texas rules also add stricter regulations for the products that remain legal. For example, hemp products cannot be sold to anyone under 21 years old, and businesses must follow stronger requirements for testing, labeling, and packaging. These regulations have faced legal challenges and have been temporarily paused pending a ruling.

As of April 8, 2026, Travis County Judge Maya Guerra Gamble granted a temporary lift on the ban. The hearing to discuss the smokeable hemp ban was said to be postponed until April 28th, 2026.

Beginning July 31, 2026, Texas Department of State Health Services implemented a ban on most THC products that were previously legal and available to consumers according to the 2018 Farm Bill and the 2019 Texas HB 1325. After reinstating the 2021 designation of tetrahydrocannabinols and marijuana extract as Schedule I hallucinogenic substances, many of the previously legal products are now considered controlled substances.

The most significant effect of the ban are the criminal penalties associated with buying and possessing hemp and cannabis products. Previously legal possession can now be penalized criminally and creates confusion and uncertainty for consumers, particularly those who may possess products purchased before the ban took effect.

The potential penalties for various amounts are:

- 2 oz or less: up to 180 days in jail and a fine up to $2,000
- More than 2 oz but less than 4 oz: up to 1 year in jail and a fine up to $4,000
- More than 4 oz but less than 5 lbs: 180 days to 2 years in jail and a fine up to $10,000
- More than 5 lbs but less than 50 lbs: 2 to 10 years in prison and a fine up to $10,000
- More than 50 lbs but less than 2,000 lbs: 2 to 20 years in prison and a fine up to $10,000
- More than 2,000 lbs: 5 to 99 years in prison and a fine up to $50,000

=== Democratic primary question on legalization (2026) ===
The 2026 primary ballot issued to registered Democratic Party voters included the following ballot proposition: "Texas should legalize cannabis for adults and automatically expunge criminal records for past low-level cannabis offenses.". 80.13% of respondents voted Yes. The results are non-binding on legislators.

=== County and municipal level ===
==== El Paso drug legalization resolution (2009) ====
In January 2009, the city council of El Paso voted 8–0 in favor of a resolution sponsored by councilman Beto O'Rourke calling for a national debate regarding the legalization of drugs as a way to reduce drug cartel violence. The resolution was then vetoed by the mayor, however, and an attempt to override the veto one week later failed by a 4–4 vote. Members of the council had been swayed by pressure from Rep. Silvestre Reyes and several state lawmakers who warned that future allocation of federal funds to the city could be affected.

==== Austin cite-and-release (2009) ====
In February 2009, the Austin Police Department instituted a policy of cite-and-release for possession of small amounts of cannabis. The Travis County Sheriff's Office, which encompasses a large part of the Austin metro area, had already been operating under such a policy since the end of 2007.

==== Harris County First Chance Intervention Program (2014) ====
In October 2014, Harris County District Attorney Devon Anderson announced the launch of the First Chance Intervention Program. Under the program, persons possessing less than two ounces of cannabis would still be subject to arrest, but could avoid a criminal conviction by attending drug education classes or performing community service. In January 2016 the program was expanded so that a citation was given instead of arrest, and all law enforcement agencies within the county were required to comply.

==== Harris County Misdemeanor Marijuana Diversion Program (2017) ====
In February 2017, Harris County District Attorney Kim Ogg announced the launch of the Misdemeanor Marijuana Diversion Program that further expanded upon the reforms of the First Chance Intervention Program. Under the new program, persons possessing less than four ounces of cannabis would not face criminal charges or even be issued a citation as long as they agreed to attend a four-hour drug education class. The new program also differed in that persons who had committed previous cannabis offenses would still be eligible to participate. The program went into effect in March 2017.

==== Dallas cite-and-release (2017) ====
In April 2017 the Dallas City Council voted 10–5 to adopt a cite-and-release policy for possession of less than 4 ounces of cannabis. In October 2017 county commissioners 4–1 voted to approve the plan, and it went into effect in December 2017.

==== Bexar County cite-and-release, diversion (2017) ====
In September 2017, Bexar Country District Attorney Nico LaHood announced a new cite-and-release policy for persons caught with less than 4 ounces of cannabis. The program also allowed cited individuals to avoid criminal charges by attending a class, paying a fine, and performing community service. The policy went into effect for the Bexar County Sheriff's Office in January 2018.

==== El Paso County First Chance Program (2017) ====
In October 2017, El Paso County commissioners voted unanimously to allow people caught with less than 4 ounces of cannabis to pay a $100 fine and perform 8 hours of community service in lieu of facing criminal charges. Named the First Chance Program, it only applies to people that are not caught with any other drugs.

==== Travis County diversion program (2017) ====
In December 2017, Travis County commissioners unanimously approved a plan to allow persons cited for less than two ounces of cannabis to take a four-hour educational course (at the cost of $45) rather than being subject to criminal charges. The policy went into effect in January 2018.

==== Dallas County limited enforcement, diversion (2019) ====
In April 2019, Dallas County District Attorney John Creuzot announced that individuals caught possessing misdemeanor amounts of cannabis would no longer be prosecuted for first-time offenses. Individuals who commit subsequent offenses would be offered diversionary courses to avoid a criminal conviction.

==== Bexar County expanded cite-and-release, limited enforcement (2019) ====
In May 2019, Bexar County District Attorney Joe Gonzales announced that an expanded version of cite-and-release would be implemented during the summer and apply to San Antonio Police Department as well. Additionally, Gonzales announced that his office would no longer prosecute possession of less than one ounce of cannabis.

==== Austin depenalization (2020) ====
In January 2020, Austin City Council voted 9–0 in favor of a resolution that effectively eliminates penalties for possessing up to 4 ounces of cannabis and directs the city manager to "take the steps necessary and appropriate to eliminate, to the furthest extent allowable under state law ... the use of arrest or other enforcement action for cannabis-related possession offenses". In July 2020 Austin Police Department announced that it had revised its enforcement policies to comply with the resolution. The resolution along with banning the use of no-knock warrants was formalized via local ballot measure Proposition A in May 2022.

==== El Paso cite-and-release (2020) ====
In May 2020, El Paso City Council voted 7–0 to adopt a cite-and-release policy for possession of less than 4 ounces of cannabis. The measure directed the city manager to devise a plan to put the policy in effect by September 1.

==== Dallas limited enforcement (2021) ====
In March 2021, the Dallas Police Department announced that they would cease charging people for possession of less than 2 ounces of cannabis, although under certain circumstances an individual would still be charged such as if there are any signs of intent to sell or if in possession of a firearm.

==== Plano decriminalization (2021) ====
In April 2021, the Plano Police Department announced that they would no longer arrest people caught with less than 2 ounces of cannabis. Instead, they may issue tickets for Possession of Drug Paraphernalia, a Class C misdemeanor.

==== Austin and other city reforms (2022) ====
In May 2022, Austin voters approved Proposition A by a 85–15 margin to prevent the enforcement of cannabis laws in most circumstances in the city (though police can still confiscate the drug). In November 2022, voters approved similar measures in the cities of Killeen, Denton, San Marcos, Harker Heights, and Elgin. However, in January 2024, Attorney General Ken Paxton sued the cities of Austin, Killeen, Denton, San Marcos, and Elgin to block the ordinances, saying in a press release that the cities had adopted "amnesty and non-prosecution policies that violate Texas laws concerning marijuana possession and distribution".

== Advocacy ==
=== Republican Party of Texas ===
In June 2018, delegates at the Republican Party of Texas 2018 convention voted to approve a set of platform planks endorsing cannabis policy reform. The following were approved by delegates:

- A plank calling for "a change in the law to make it a civil, and not a criminal, offense for legal adults only to possess one ounce or less of marijuana for personal use, punishable by a fine of up to $100, but without jail time" (passed with 81% of the vote).
- A plank calling for the Texas Legislature to "improve the 2015 Compassionate Use Act to allow doctors to determine the appropriate use of cannabis to certified patients" (passed with 90% of the vote).
- A plank calling for Congress to "remove cannabis from the list of Schedule 1 and move to Schedule 2" (passed with 82% of the vote).
- A plank calling for the Texas Legislature to "pass legislation allowing cultivation, manufacture, and sale of industrial hemp and hemp products" (passed with 83% of the vote).

In June 2022, the Texas Republican Party approved platform planks again supporting the rescheduling of cannabis but also opposing the legalization of cannabis for recreational purposes. Planks were approved that read as follows:

- Marijuana Remains Illegal: Oppose the legalization of recreational marijuana and offer opportunities for drug treatment before penalties for its illegal possession, use, or distribution
- Cannabis Classification: Congress should remove cannabis from the list of Schedule 1 and move to Schedule 2.
- Reduce Business Regulations: We believe that the following businesses should be minimally regulated at all levels… Use of hemp as an agricultural commodity.
- Addiction: We oppose legalization and decriminalization of illicit natural and/or illegal synthetic drugs, and we support the exercise of a zero-tolerance policy with maximum penalty for illegal drug manufacturers and distributors. We also oppose any needle exchange programs. Faith-based rehabilitation programs should be considered as a part of an overall rehabilitation program.

=== Texas Democratic Party ===
In June 2018, delegates at the Texas Democratic Party 2018 convention voted to approve a set of platform planks endorsing the legalization of cannabis for medical and recreational purposes. The following were approved by delegates:

- A plank calling for legislation in Texas to "legalize possession and use of cannabis and its derivatives and to regulate its use, production and sale as is successfully done in Colorado, Washington and other States".
- Planks calling for the "immediate legalization of medical cannabis" and "federal legislation to remove cannabis as a Schedule 1 Controlled Substance".
- A plank calling for the "immediate release of individuals incarcerated for possession of cannabis and expungement of criminal records of persons convicted or receiving Deferred Adjudication for misdemeanor cannabis offenses".
- A plank calling for the "legalization of hemp for agricultural purposes".

=== Other ===
Marijuana Lobby Day was first held in Austin in 2011, when 25 people showed up to press the issue to the legislature (which meets once every two years). In 2013, 50 people attended, in 2015 there were 300, and in 2017 there were 375.

Mark Stepnoski, former All-Pro offensive lineman for the Dallas Cowboys and Houston Oilers, served as president of the Texas chapter of the National Organization for the Reform of Marijuana Laws (Texas NORML) during the early 2000s.

Texas Cannabis Collective, a pro-legalization group, was founded in 2016.

== See also ==
- History of vice in Texas
