= Texas's 7th House of Representatives district =

American legislative district

Texas's 7th State House of Representatives district
Representative
Jay Dean; R–Longview
- Demographics: 57.7% White; 21.7% Black; 16.9% Hispanic; 1.5% Asian; 2.2% Other
- Population (2020) • Voting age: 202,803; 153,884

District 7 is a district in the Texas House of Representatives. It was created in the 3rd legislature (1849–1851).

The district has been represented by Republican Jay Dean since January 10, 2017, upon his initial election to the Texas House.

As a result of redistricting after the 2020 Federal census, from the 2022 elections the district encompasses all of Gregg, Harrison, and Marion Counties. Major cities in the district include Jefferson, Longview, and Marshall.

== List of representatives ==
(Source:)

Leg.	Representative	Party	Term start	Term end	Counties they represented
3rd	William M. Cochran	Unknown	November 5, 1849	November 3, 1851	Dallas, Denton
4th	William C. Edwards	Unknown	November 3, 1851	November 7, 1853	San Augustine
5th	James W. Throckmorton	Unknown	November 7, 1853	November 5, 1855	Collin, Cooke, Denton
6th	James W. Throckmorton	Unknown	November 5, 1855	November 2, 1857	Collin, Cooke, Denton
7th	Absolom Bishop	Unknown	November 2, 1857	November 7, 1859	Collin, Cooke, Denton
8th	William A. Ellett	Unknown	November 7, 1859	February 5, 1861	Collin, Cooke, Denton
8th	Thomas Lewellen	Unknown	March 18, 1861	November 4, 1861	Collin, Cooke, Denton
9th	Blackstone Hardeman	Unknown	November 4, 1861	November 2, 1863	Nacogdoches
10th	Bennett Blake	Unknown	November 2, 1863	August 6, 1866	Nacogdoches
11th	Charles Childress Grayson	Unknown	August 8, 1866	February 7, 1870	Nacogdoches
12th	Mitchell Kendall; Henry Moore	Radical Republican	February 8, 1870	January 14, 1873	Harrison
13th	Shack Roberts; Henry Moore	Republican	January 14, 1873	January 13, 1874	Harrison
14th	Leslie Cazneau DeMorse; Benjamin Holland Epperson; Henry F. O'Neal	Democratic	January 13, 1874	April 18, 1876	Bowie, Cass, Marion
15th	Caleb Jackson Garrison	Democratic	April 18, 1876	January 14, 1879	Rusk
16th	Caleb Jackson Garrison	Democratic	January 14, 1879	January 11, 1881	Rusk
17th	George Henry Gould	Democratic	January 11, 1881	January 9, 1883	Rusk
18th	Simeon Burns	Democratic	January 9, 1883	January 13, 1885	Panola
19th	James Ras Jones	Democratic	January 13, 1885	January 11, 1887	Panola
20th	James Ras Jones	Democratic	January 11, 1887	January 8, 1889	Panola
21st	James Ras Jones	Democratic	January 8, 1889	January 13, 1891	Panola
22nd	James Ras Jones	Democratic	January 13, 1891	January 10, 1893	Panola
23rd	William Jordan Hood	Democratic	January 10, 1893	January 8, 1895	Fannin
24th	William Ambrose Bramlette; Jacob Lee Carpenter	Democratic	January 8, 1895	January 12, 1897	Fannin
25th	Jacob Lee Carpenter; John Calvin Meade	Democratic	January 12, 1897	January 10, 1899	Fannin
26th	Rosser Thomas; William R. Evans	Democratic	January 10, 1899	January 8, 1901	Fannin
27th	William R. Evans; Wilburn W. Ridling; John Cunningham	Democratic	January 8, 1901; January 10, 1901; February 15, 1901	January 13, 1903; January 18, 1901; January 13, 1903	Fannin
28th	James Wilson Hurt	Democratic	January 13, 1903	January 10, 1905	Cass
29th	Hardy A. O'Neal	Unknown	January 10, 1905	January 8, 1907	Cass
30th	Hardy A. O'Neal	Unknown	January 8, 1907	May 11, 1907	Cass
31st	George Washington Fant	Democratic	January 12, 1909	January 10, 1911	Cass
32nd	George Washington Fant	Democratic	January 10, 1911	January 14, 1913	Cass
33rd	Angus T. Russell	Democratic	January 14, 1913	January 12, 1915	Nacogdoches
34th	Angus T. Russell	Democratic	January 12, 1915	January 9, 1917	Nacogdoches
35th	William E. Thomason	Democratic	January 9, 1917	January 14, 1919	Nacogdoches
36th	William E. Thomason	Democratic	January 14, 1919	January 11, 1921	Nacogdoches
37th	William E. Thomason	Democratic	January 11, 1921	January 9, 1923	Nacogdoches
38th	William Scott Crawford	Democratic	January 9, 1923	January 13, 1925	Panola
39th	Sidney Smith Baker	Democratic	January 13, 1925	November 10, 1925	Panola
39th	Samuel Bertram Wallace	Democratic	September 13, 1926	January 11, 1927	Panola
40th	Samuel Bertram Wallace	Democratic	January 11, 1927	January 8, 1929	Panola
41st	James Elbert Heaton	Democratic	January 8, 1929	January 13, 1931	Panola
42nd	Lon E. Alsup	Democratic	January 13, 1931	January 10, 1933	Panola
43rd	Lon E. Alsup	Democratic	January 10, 1933	January 8, 1935	Panola
44th	Lon E. Alsup	Democratic	January 8, 1935	January 12, 1937	Panola
45th	Lon E. Alsup	Democratic	January 12, 1937	January 10, 1939	Panola
46th	Lon E. Alsup	Democratic	January 10, 1939	January 14, 1941	Panola
47th	Lon E. Alsup	Democratic	January 14, 1941	September 24, 1941	Panola
47th	Mervyn Lee Ramsey	Democratic	July 25, 1942	January 12, 1943	Panola
48th	Mervyn Lee Ramsey	Democratic	January 12, 1943	January 9, 1945	Panola
49th	Mervyn Lee Ramsey	Democratic	January 9, 1945	September 27, 1945	Panola
50th	Thomas Harris Sharp	Democratic	January 14, 1947	December 3, 1948	Panola
51st	Osceola A. Cassity	Democratic	January 11, 1949	January 9, 1951	Panola
52nd	Osceola A. Cassity	Democratic	January 9, 1951	January 13, 1953	Panola
53rd	Robert William Patten	Democratic	January 13, 1953	January 11, 1955	Jasper, Newton, Tyler
54th	Robert William Patten	Democratic	January 11, 1955	January 8, 1957	Jasper, Newton, Tyler
55th	Ernest Everett Shackelford	Democratic	January 8, 1957	January 13, 1959	Jasper, Newton, Tyler
56th	Sam Forse Collins	Democratic	January 13, 1959	January 10, 1961	Jasper, Newton, Tyler
57th	Sam Forse Collins	Democratic	January 10, 1961	January 8, 1963	Jasper, Newton, Tyler
58th	Sam Forse Collins	Democratic	January 8, 1963	January 12, 1965	Jasper, Newton, Sabine, Tyler
59th	James Everette Miller	Democratic	January 12, 1965	January 10, 1967	Jasper, Newton, Sabine, Tyler
60th	James Everette Miller	Democratic	January 10, 1967	January 14, 1969	Hardin, Jasper, Newton, Tyler
61st	Don Adams	Democratic	January 14, 1969	January 12, 1971	Hardin, Jasper, Newton, Tyler
62nd	Don Adams	Democratic	January 12, 1971	January 9, 1973	Hardin, Jasper, Newton, Tyler
63rd	Terry Doyle (7−1); Pike Powers (7−2); Carl A. Parker (7−3)	Democratic	January 9, 1973	January 14, 1975	Jefferson
64th	Chester L. Slay Jr. (7−1); Pike Powers (7−2); Carl A. Parker (7−3)	Democratic	January 14, 1975	January 11, 1977	Jefferson
65th	Albert Price (7−A); Pike Powers (7−B); Frank Collazo Jr. (7−C)	Democratic	January 11, 1977	January 9, 1979	Jefferson
66th	Albert Price (7−A); Bo Crawford (7−B); Frank Collazo Jr. (7−C)	Democratic	January 9, 1979	January 13, 1981	Jefferson
67th	Albert Price (7−A); Bo Crawford (7−B); Frank Collazo Jr. (7−C)	Democratic	January 13, 1981	January 11, 1983	Jefferson
68th	Jimmy Mankins	Democratic	January 11, 1983	January 8, 1985	Gregg
69th	Jerry Yost	Republican	January 8, 1985	January 13, 1987	Gregg
70th	Jerry Yost	Republican	January 13, 1987	January 10, 1989	Gregg
71st	Jerry Yost	Republican	January 10, 1989	January 8, 1991	Gregg
72nd	Jerry Yost	Republican	January 8, 1991	January 12, 1993	Gregg
73rd	Jerry Yost	Republican	January 12, 1993	January 10, 1995	Gregg, Rusk
74th	Jerry Yost	Republican	January 10, 1995	January 14, 1997	Gregg, Rusk
75th	Tommy Merritt	Republican	January 14, 1997	January 12, 1999	Gregg, Rusk
76th	Tommy Merritt	Republican	January 12, 1999	January 9, 2001	Gregg, Rusk
77th	Tommy Merritt	Republican	January 9, 2001	January 14, 2003	Gregg, Rusk
78th	Tommy Merritt	Republican	January 14, 2003	January 11, 2005	Gregg, Smith
79th	Tommy Merritt	Republican	January 11, 2005	January 9, 2007	Gregg, Smith
80th	Tommy Merritt	Republican	January 9, 2007	January 13, 2009	Gregg, Smith
81st	Tommy Merritt	Republican	January 13, 2009	January 11, 2011	Gregg, Smith
82nd	David Simpson	Republican	January 11, 2011	January 8, 2013	Gregg, Smith
83rd	David Simpson	Republican	January 8, 2013	January 13, 2015	Gregg, Upshur
84th	David Simpson	Republican	January 13, 2015	January 10, 2017	Gregg, Upshur
85th	Jay Dean	Republican	January 10, 2017	January 8, 2019	Gregg, Upshur
86th	Jay Dean	Republican	January 8, 2019	January 12, 2021	Gregg, Upshur
87th	Jay Dean	Republican	January 12, 2021	January 10, 2023	Gregg, Upshur
88th	Jay Dean	Republican	January 10, 2023	January 14, 2025	Gregg, Harrison, Marion
89th	Jay Dean	Republican	January 14, 2025	Present	Gregg, Harrison, Marion
