= Susan Reed (district attorney) =

American attorney, judge (born 1950)

- Born: Susan D. Reed; September 28, 1950 (age 75); San Antonio, Texas United States
- Occupations: attorney, judge

Susan D. Reed (born September 28, 1950) was the Criminal District Attorney of Bexar County, Texas from 1998 to January 3, 2015. She is a member of the Republican Party.

== Career ==
Reed was elected District Attorney of Bexar County (San Antonio) in 1998, becoming the first woman to hold the office. She served as Judge of the 144th District Court (San Antonio) from 1986 to 1998. She served as an Assistant District Attorney for Bexar County from 1974 to 1982, including duties as chief prosecutor for court districts 144 and 187. Reed was in private practice from 1982 to 1986, with the firm Soules and Reed, specializing in business litigation.

During her tenure as a 144th District Court Judge, she helped create a "Gang Unit" in the Adult Probation department. As Bexar County District Attorney, she has created a new "Elder Fraud Unit" and successfully lobbied the Texas Legislature to increase penalties for crimes against the elderly. Reed is a member of the National Advisory Council on Violence Against Women. She was appointed to the Criminal Justice Policy Council for Governor Bill Clements. Later, Governor George W. Bush appointed her to serve on the Governor’s Juvenile Justice Advisory Board. She continued to serve on that board under Governor Rick Perry.

== 2014 Midterm Elections ==
Susan Reed was defeated by Democrat Nicholas "Nico" LaHood on November 4, 2014 during the midterm elections by a margin of 48 to 51 percent, respectively. Lahood went against Reed back in 2010, but was defeated by a margin of 54-46 percent. LaHood was supported in 2014 by 1.5 million dollars from Thomas J Henry, a personal injury lawyer who had ties to lawyers Reed had indicted for barratry. See Bexar County Elections Department COH reports.

== Involvements in the case of Ruben Cantu ==
The 1985 conviction and 1993 execution of Ruben Cantu were the subject of a series of investigative articles by Houston Chronicle reporter Lise Olsen in 2005 and 2006. In these articles, Olsen claimed to have uncovered evidence that undermined the Cantu conviction. According to Olsen, the jury forewoman, the then-district attorney, the trial judge, the co-defendant, and the surviving victim all expressed misgivings about the outcome of the Cantu case. The only evidence linking Cantu to the crime was the testimony of Juan Moreno, the surviving victim, but he since recanted his testimony, claiming he had felt threatened by police.

As the district attorney, Susan Reed investigated the claims of wrongful conviction in the Cantu case. The investigation was to determine if Moreno should be charged with murder by perjury. Her office concluded that Cantu's conviction was justified and that no credible evidence existed to support the witnesses' claims of innocence. The report concluded that Moreno had been induced to change his testimony by opponents of the death penalty, who gave him $1,000 meals, and a hotel room, then subjected him to questioning that was "improper and highly suggestive. Another gave inconsistent details and had changed his story at least 8 times. Cantu had also repeatedly implicated himself in the murder to his friends, his lawyers, and even prison officials.
