= 2026 Bexar County elections =

Local elections in Texas

- November 3, 2026

A general election was held in Bexar County, Texas, on November 3, 2026, to elect various county-level positions. Primary elections were held on March 3, and primary runoff elections were held on May 26 in races where no candidate received a majority of the vote.

== County Judge ==
Incumbent county judge Peter Sakai ran for re-election, but was defeated in the Democratic primary by Ron Nirenberg.

== District Attorney ==
Incumbent district attorney Joe Gonzales is retiring.

== District Clerk ==
=== Democratic primary ===
==== Candidates ====
===== Nominee =====
- Chris Castillo, former district clerk employee

===== Eliminated in primary =====
- Gloria Martinez, candidate for district clerk in 2022

===== Eliminated in primary =====
- Monica Ramirez Alcántara, former county party chair
- Raul Davila, litigation support company owner
- Elva Abundis Esparza, lawyer and former district clerk employee

==== Results ====
Democratic primary
Party	Candidate	Votes	%
Democratic	Gloria A. Martinez	51,253	33.40
Democratic	Christine "Chris" Castillo	36,813	23.99
Democratic	Monica Ramirez Alcántara	36,127	23.55
Democratic	Elva Abundis Esparza	15,440	10.06
Democratic	Raul Davila	13,797	8.99
Total votes		153,430	100.00

==== Runoff ====
===== Results =====
Democratic primary runoff
Party	Candidate	Votes	%
Democratic	Christine "Chris" Castillo	27,629	50.84
Democratic	Gloria A. Martinez	26,717	49.16
Total votes		54,346	100.00

=== General election ===
==== Results ====
2026 Bexar County District Clerk election
Party	Candidate	Votes	%
Democratic	Christine "Chris" Castillo	418,399	100.00
Total votes		418,399	100.00

== County Clerk ==
=== Democratic primary ===
==== Candidates ====
===== Nominee =====
- Lucy Adame-Clark, incumbent county clerk

===== Eliminated in primary =====
- Cynthia Castro, insurance lawyer

===== Eliminated in primary =====
- Mari Sanchez Belew, budget and finance analyst

==== Results ====
Democratic primary
Party	Candidate	Votes	%
Democratic	Lucy Adame-Clark (incumbent)	72,349	46.47
Democratic	Cynthia Castro	60,280	38.71
Democratic	Mari Sanchez Belew	23,073	14.82
Total votes		155,702	100.00

==== Runoff ====
===== Results =====
Democratic primary runoff
Party	Candidate	Votes	%
Democratic	Lucy Adame-Clark (incumbent)	33,119	60.47
Democratic	Cynthia Castro	21,651	39.53
Total votes		54,770	100.00

=== General election ===
==== Results ====
2026 Bexar County Clerk election
Party	Candidate	Votes	%
Democratic	Lucy Adame-Clark (incumbent)	421,095	100.00
Total votes		421,095	100.00

== Commissioners Court ==
=== Precinct 2 ===
==== Democratic primary ====
===== Candidates =====
====== Nominee ======
- Justin Rodriguez, incumbent commissioner

===== Results =====
Democratic primary
Party	Candidate	Votes	%
Democratic	Justin Rodriguez (incumbent)	35,015	100.00
Total votes		35,015	100.00

==== Republican primary ====
===== Candidates =====
====== Nominee ======
- David Sherwood Hill, artificial intelligence company owner

===== Results =====
Republican primary
Party	Candidate	Votes	%
Republican	David Sherwood Hill	10,723	100.00
Total votes		10,723	100.00

==== General election ====
===== Results =====
2026 Bexar County Commissioners Court election, precinct 2
Party	Candidate	Votes	%
Democratic	Justin Rodriguez (incumbent)	99,363	71.64
Republican	David Sherwood Hill	39,327	28.36
Total votes		138,690	100.00

=== Precinct 4 ===
==== Democratic primary ====
===== Candidates =====
====== Nominee ======
- Tommy Calvert Jr., incumbent commissioner

===== Results =====
Democratic primary
Party	Candidate	Votes	%
Democratic	Tommy Calvert Jr. (incumbent)	32,484	100.00
Total votes		32,484	100.00

==== General election ====
===== Results =====
2026 Bexar County Commissioners Court election, precinct 4
Party	Candidate	Votes	%
Democratic	Tommy Calvert Jr. (incumbent)	92,358	80.01
Independent	Roy Anthony II	23,080	19.99
Total votes		115,438	100.00

== County Court at Law ==
=== No. 1 ===
==== Nominees ====
- Bob Behrens (Republican)
- Helen Petry Stowe, incumbent judge (Democratic)

==== General election ====
===== Results =====
2026 Bexar County Court at Law No. 1 election
Party	Candidate	Votes	%
Democratic	Helen Petry Stowe (incumbent)	404,893	64.62
Republican	Bob Behrens	221,711	35.38
Total votes		626,604	100.00

=== No. 2 ===
==== Nominee ====
- Melissa Saenz, incumbent judge (Democratic)

==== General election ====
===== Results =====
2026 Bexar County Court at Law No. 2 election
Party	Candidate	Votes	%
Democratic	Melissa Saenz (incumbent)	421,742	100.00
Total votes		421,742	100.00

=== No. 3 ===
==== Nominee ====
- David J. Rodriguez, incumbent judge (Democratic)

==== General election ====
===== Results =====
2026 Bexar County Court at Law No. 3 election
Party	Candidate	Votes	%
Democratic	David J. Rodriguez (incumbent)	421,550	100.00
Total votes		421,550	100.00

=== No. 4 ===
==== Nominees ====
- Jason R. Garrahan (Republican)
- Alfredo Ximenez, incumbent judge (Democratic)

==== General election ====
===== Results =====
2026 Bexar County Court at Law No. 4 election
Party	Candidate	Votes	%
Democratic	Alfredo Ximenez (incumbent)	403,519	64.60
Republican	Jason R. Garrahan	221,088	35.40
Total votes		624,607	100.00

=== No. 5 ===
==== Nominee ====
- Andrea Arevalos, incumbent judge (Democratic)

==== General election ====
===== Results =====
2026 Bexar County Court at Law No. 5 election
Party	Candidate	Votes	%
Democratic	Andrea Arevalos (incumbent)	418,995	100.00
Total votes		418,995	100.00

=== No. 6 ===
==== Nominee ====
- Erica Dominguez, incumbent judge (Democratic)

==== General election ====
===== Results =====
2026 Bexar County Court at Law No. 6 election
Party	Candidate	Votes	%
Democratic	Erica Dominguez (incumbent)	420,217	100.00
Total votes		420,217	100.00

=== No. 7 ===
==== Nominee ====
- Melanie Lira, incumbent judge (Democratic)

==== General election ====
===== Results =====
2026 Bexar County Court at Law No. 7 election
Party	Candidate	Votes	%
Democratic	Melanie Lira (incumbent)	418,837	100.00
Total votes		418,837	100.00

=== No. 8 ===
==== Democratic primary ====
===== Candidates =====
====== Nominee ======
- Victoria Cruz

====== Eliminated in primary ======
- Cleo Marshall III

===== Results =====
Democratic primary
Party	Candidate	Votes	%
Democratic	Victoria Cruz	103,118	67.48
Democratic	Cleo Marshall III	49,697	32.52
Total votes		152,815	100.00

==== Republican primary ====
===== Candidates =====
====== Nominee ======
- Celeste Brown

==== General election ====
===== Results =====
2026 Bexar County Court at Law No. 8 election
Party	Candidate	Votes	%
Democratic	Victoria Cruz	399,563	63.80
Republican	Celeste Brown	226,672	36.20
Total votes		626,235	100.00

=== No. 9 ===
==== Democratic primary ====
===== Candidates =====
====== Nominee ======
- Jessica Gonzalez

====== Eliminated in primary ======
- Lizz Lane
- Maritza Perez-Stewart

===== Results =====
Democratic primary
Party	Candidate	Votes	%
Democratic	Jessica Gonzalez	75,438	50.20
Democratic	Maritza Perez-Stewart	49,045	32.63
Democratic	Lizz Lane	25,803	17.17
Total votes		152,815	100.00

==== Republican primary ====
===== Candidates =====
====== Nominee ======
- Daphne Previti Austin

==== General election ====
===== Results =====
2026 Bexar County Court at Law No. 9 election
Party	Candidate	Votes	%
Democratic	Jessica Gonzalez	403,417	64.49
Republican	Daphne Previti Austin	222,129	35.51
Total votes		625,546	100.00

=== No. 10 ===
==== Democratic primary ====
===== Candidates =====
====== Nominee ======
- Cesar Garcia, incumbent judge

====== Eliminated in primary ======
- Shannon Salmon

====== Eliminated in primary ======
- Adam Flores

===== Results =====
Democratic primary
Party	Candidate	Votes	%
Democratic	Cesar Garcia (incumbent)	64,873	43.10
Democratic	Shannon Salmon	57,771	38.39
Democratic	Adam Flores	27,858	18.51
Total votes		152,815	100.00

===== Runoff =====
====== Results ======
Democratic primary runoff
Party	Candidate	Votes	%
Democratic	Cesar Garcia (incumbent)	35,125	64.54
Democratic	Shannon Salmon	19,302	35.46
Total votes		54,427	100.00

==== General election ====
===== Results =====
2026 Bexar County Court at Law No. 10 election
Party	Candidate	Votes	%
Democratic	Cesar Garcia (incumbent)	417,385	100.00
Total votes		417,385	100.00

=== No. 11 ===
==== Nominee ====
- Erica Pena, incumbent judge (Democratic)

==== General election ====
===== Results =====
2026 Bexar County Court at Law No. 11 election
Party	Candidate	Votes	%
Democratic	Erica Pena (incumbent)	418,415	100.00
Total votes		418,415	100.00

=== No. 12 ===
==== Democratic primary ====
===== Candidates =====
====== Nominee ======
- Lauren Zamora

====== Eliminated in primary ======
- Yolanda Huff, incumbent judge

===== Results =====
Democratic primary
Party	Candidate	Votes	%
Democratic	Lauren Zamora	94,343	63.28
Democratic	Yolanda Huff (incumbent)	54,739	36.72
Total votes		149,082	100.00

==== Republican primary ====
===== Candidates =====
====== Nominee ======
- Deborah Dietzmann

==== General election ====
===== Results =====
2026 Bexar County Court at Law No. 12 election
Party	Candidate	Votes	%
Democratic	Lauren Zamora	402,261	64.85
Republican	Deborah Dietzmann	218,033	35.15
Total votes		620,294	100.00

=== No. 13 ===
==== Democratic primary ====
===== Candidates =====
====== Nominee ======
- Alicia Perez

====== Eliminated in primary ======
- Rosie Gonzalez, incumbent judge

===== Results =====
Democratic primary
Party	Candidate	Votes	%
Democratic	Alicia Perez	97,907	65.04
Democratic	Rosie Gonzalez (incumbent)	52,633	34.96
Total votes		150,540	100.00

==== General election ====
===== Results =====
2026 Bexar County Court at Law No. 13 election
Party	Candidate	Votes	%
Democratic	Alicia Perez	417,222	100.00
Total votes		417,222	100.00

=== No. 14 ===
==== Democratic primary ====
===== Candidates =====
====== Nominee ======
- Audrey Martinez

====== Eliminated in primary ======
- Carlo Key, incumbent judge

===== Results =====
Democratic primary
Party	Candidate	Votes	%
Democratic	Audrey Martinez	93,381	63.42
Democratic	Carlo Key (incumbent)	52,633	34.96
Total votes		150,540	100.00

==== General election ====
===== Results =====
2026 Bexar County Court at Law No. 14 election
Party	Candidate	Votes	%
Democratic	Audrey Martinez	415,388	100.00
Total votes		415,388	100.00

=== No. 15 ===
==== Nominee ====
- Melissa Vara, incumbent judge (Democratic)

==== General election ====
===== Results =====
2026 Bexar County Court at Law No. 15 election
Party	Candidate	Votes	%
Democratic	Melissa Vara (incumbent)	417,948	100.00
Total votes		417,948	100.00
