= Jay Dean (politician) =

American politician

Member of the Texas House of Representatives from the 7th district
- Incumbent
- Assumed office January 10, 2017
- Preceded by: David Simpson

Mayor of Longview, Texas
- In office 2006–2016

Personal details
- Born: James Wallace Dean; March 5, 1953 (age 73) Opelousas, Louisiana, U.S.
- Party: Republican
- Spouse: Jane Willis Dean
- Children: 3
- Education: Louisiana State University (BA)

James Wallace "Jay" Dean (born March 5, 1953) is an American politician. A Republican, he has been the member of the Texas House of Representatives for District 7, which encompasses all of Gregg, Harrison, and Marion Counties in East Texas, since 2017.

== Early life and education ==
Dean was born in Opelousas, Louisiana, and earned a Bachelor of Arts degree from Louisiana State University.

== Career ==
Prior to his election to the legislature, Dean served seven years as a city councilman and then ten years as the mayor of Longview, Texas, ending his term on May 15, 2016. As mayor, Dean refused to sign a proclamation for LGBT pride. In 2014, the city of Longview broke a contract with musician Ted Nugent to perform at Longview's Fourth of July concert, with Dean stating that Nugent "didn't really fit what we're trying to put together, a family-oriented program."

Following his service as mayor, Dean won the Republican nomination for Texas House of Representatives on a platform of border security, job creation, and protecting East Texas water and other resources. He won the 2016 Republican primary election and was sworn into the State Legislature on January 10, 2017, succeeding Republican David Simpson, who did not seek re-election. Dean did not face a Democratic opponent in the general election held on November 8, 2016. Dean ran without opposition for his second House term in the general election held on November 6, 2018.

=== 85th Legislature ===
In his inaugural legislative session, Dean filed ten pieces of legislation. All but three were signed into law by Governor Greg Abbott. Dean was selected to serve on the Local and Consent Calendar Committee, the Committee on Investments and Financial Services, and the House Appropriations Committee. Dean was also appointed to serve on the House Select Committee on Opioids and Substance Abuse.

== Political views ==
According to his website, Dean shares "East Texas conservative values"; promises to "protect our gun rights" and "make sure we secure the border"; and is "deeply opposed to the practice of abortion."

He has an "A" rating from the NRA Political Victory Fund and was endorsed in his legislative campaign by Governor Greg Abbott, Texas State Rifle Association, Texas Alliance for Life, National Federation of Independent Businesses, and the Texas Association of Realtors. He was praised by the Conservative Roundtable of Texas.

== Personal life ==
He and his wife, Jane Willis Dean, moved to Longview in 1981, where they raised their three daughters. A former altar boy, Dean is active in the Roman Catholic Church and helped to found St. Matthews in Longview.

Texas House of Representatives
Preceded by David Simpson	Member of the Texas House of Representatives from the 7th district 2017–present	Incumbent
