= KROV-FM =

Coordinates: 39.5048°N 121.3108°W

- San Antonio, Texas United States; United States
- Frequency: 91.7 MHz HD2

History
- First air date: February 22, 2011

Links
- Website: krovfm.com

KTRU-HD2, branded as "KROV-FM" is a radio station based in San Antonio, Texas. This community based non-profit urban station was founded by Tommy Ray Calvert, Jr. serving as its first General Manager. Started as the second HD Radio subchannel of KRTU-FM (91.7-HD2 FM), the station is currently available online. The "KROV" call letters stand for "Restore Our Voice" and are not the legal call letters for the radio station.

== See also ==
- List of community radio stations in the United States
