= Texas NORML =

Cannabis organization

- Logo
- Tax ID no.: 75-2894776
- Parent organization: National Organization for the Reform of Marijuana Laws (NORML)
- Website: texasnorml.org

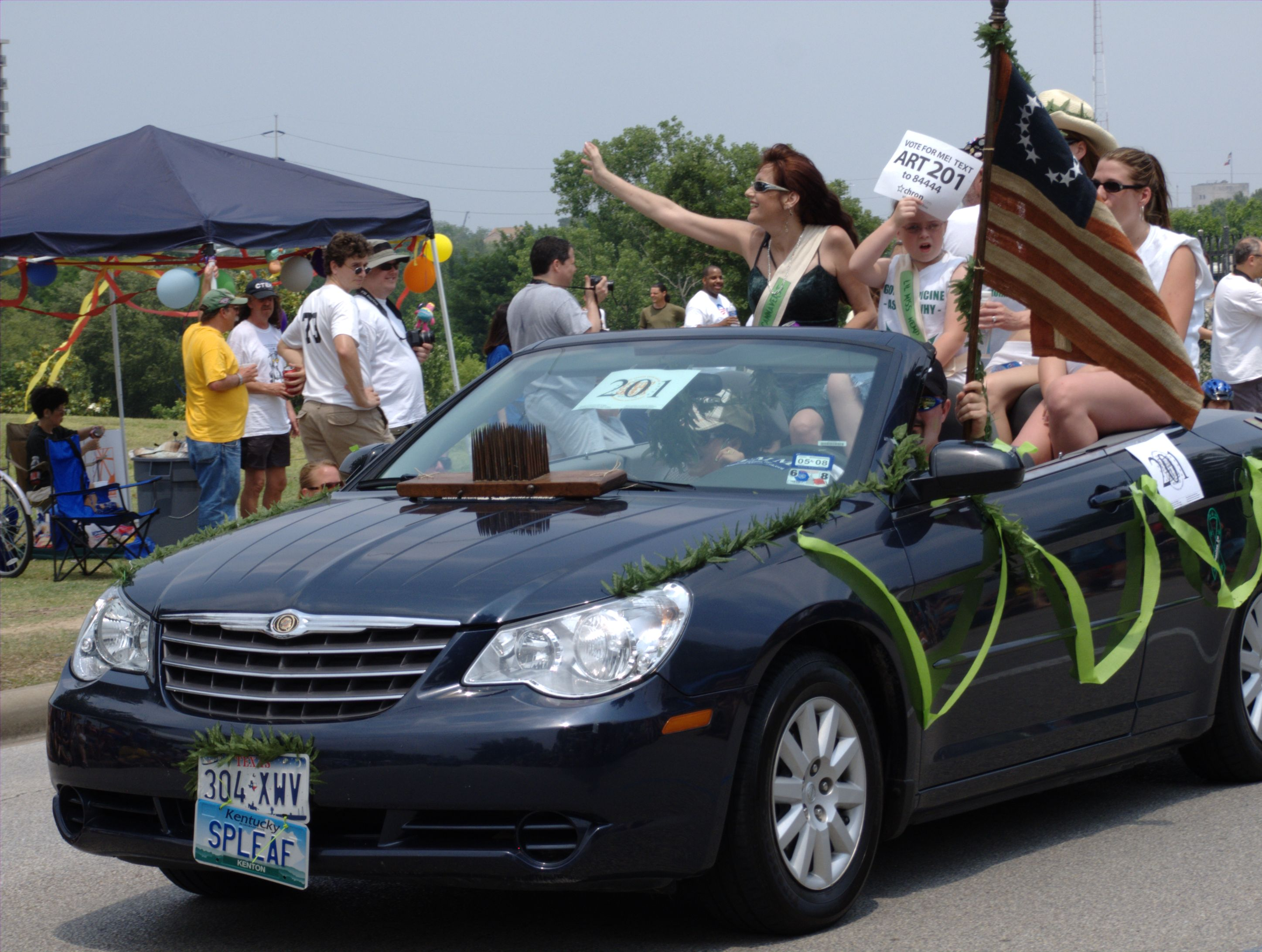
Houston NORML participation in the 2008 Art Car Parade

Texas NORML is a chapter of the National Organization for the Reform of Marijuana Laws (NORML) based in Austin, Texas. Jax Finkel served as the organization's executive director until April 1, 2024, when Betty Williams assumed the role. As of May 2024 their website has had no further updates or monthly meetings listed, with intermittent activity on their socials. The organization's lobby day that takes place in the middle of each state legislative session was co-coordinated in 2023 with Texas Cannabis Collective which took over the operation for the 89th regular session in 2025.

The organization is registered in Texas and is federally recognized as a trans-partisan, educational 501(c)(4) nonprofit. Texas NORML's mission is to change marijuana laws so that it reflects the majority opinion of Texans which is that the responsible use of cannabis by adults and patients should no longer be subject to penalty. Their focus is to increase public awareness of current laws regarding cannabis, as well as the legislative system and legislation regarding cannabis consumers in Texas.

== History ==
During the early 2000s, Mark Stepnoski, former All-Pro offensive lineman for the Dallas Cowboys and Houston Oilers, served as president of Texas NORML shortly after retiring from football.

In 2022, Texas NORML reported that polling statewide in Texas found that 67 percent of people support the legalization of the sale and use of cannabis.

== See also ==
- List of cannabis organizations
- Cannabis in Texas
