= 2026 Harris County elections =

Local elections in Texas

- November 3, 2026

A general election was held in Harris County, Texas, on November 3, 2026, to elect various county-level positions. Primary elections were held on March 3, and primary runoff elections were held on May 26 in races where no candidate received a majority of the vote.

== County Judge ==
Incumbent Democratic judge Lina Hidalgo is retiring.

== County Attorney ==
=== Democratic primary ===
==== Candidates ====
===== Nominee =====
- Abbie Kamin, member of the Houston City Council (2020–present)

===== Eliminated in primary =====
- Audrie Lawton Evans, civil court judge

==== Endorsements ====
Abbie Kamin

Newspapers

- Houston Chronicle

==== Polling ====
Poll source	Date(s) administered	Sample size (Note: Key: A – all adults RV – registered voters LV – likely voters V – unclear)	Margin of error	Abbie Kamin	Audrie Lawton Evans	Undecided
University of Houston	February 3–10, 2026	2,000 (LV)	± 2.19%	26%	13%	61%

==== Results ====
Democratic primary
Party	Candidate	Votes	%
Democratic	Abbie Kamin	157,263	50.56
Democratic	Audrie Lawton Evans	153,797	49.44
Total votes		311,060	100.00

=== Republican primary ===
==== Candidates ====
===== Nominee =====
- Jacqueline Lucci Smith, attorney

==== Results ====
Republican primary
Party	Candidate	Votes	%
Republican	Jacqueline Lucci Smith	146,929	100.00
Total votes		146,929	100.00

=== General election ===
==== Post-primary endorsements ====
Abbie Kamin (D)

Newspapers

- Houston Chronicle

==== Results ====
2026 Harris County Attorney election
Party	Candidate	Votes	%
Democratic	Abbie Kamin	823,117	62.41
Republican	Jacqueline Lucci Smith	495,819	37.59
Total votes		1,318,936	100.00

== District Clerk ==
=== Democratic primary ===
==== Candidates ====
===== Nominee =====
- Darrell Jordan Jr., attorney

===== Eliminated in primary =====
- Alex Maldonado, teacher

===== Eliminated in primary =====
- Desiree Broadnax, legal specialist
- Pernell Davis, chief of staff for precinct 2 on the board of commissioners
- Angie Dozier, special services administrator
- Donna Glover, IT program manager
- Carlis Lollie, nurse practitioner
- Rozzy Shorter, parole officer

===== Declined =====
- Marilyn Burgess, incumbent district clerk

==== Endorsements ====
Darrell Jordan

Newspapers

- Houston Chronicle

==== Polling ====
Poll source	Date(s) administered	Sample size	Margin of error	Desiree Broadnax	Pernell Davis	Angie Dozier	Donna Glover	Darrell Jordan Jr.	Carlis Lollie	Jose Maldonado	Roslyn Shorter	Undecided
University of Houston	February 3–10, 2026	2,000 (LV)	± 2.19%	3%	3%	2%	1%	2%	1%	4%	2%	82%

==== Results ====
Democratic primary
Party	Candidate	Votes	%
Democratic	Darrell Jordan Jr.	60,013	18.94
Democratic	Jose "Alex" Maldonado	59,571	18.80
Democratic	Donna G. Glover	45,404	14.33
Democratic	Pernell Davis	43,872	13.84
Democratic	Roslyn "Rozzy" Shorter	35,485	11.20
Democratic	Desiree Broadnax	32,952	10.40
Democratic	Angie Dozier	31,570	9.96
Democratic	Carlis Lollie	8,070	2.55
Total votes		316,937	100.00

==== Polling ====
Poll source	Date(s) administered	Sample size	Margin of error	Darrell Jordan Jr.	Jose Maldonado	Undecided
University of Houston	May 5–9, 2026	1,200 (LV)	± 2.83%	23%	20%	57%

===== Results =====
Democratic primary runoff
Party	Candidate	Votes	%
Democratic	Darrell Jordan Jr.	77,122	70.60
Democratic	Jose "Alex" Maldonado	32,116	29.40
Total votes		109,238	100.00

=== Republican primary ===
==== Candidates ====
===== Nominee =====
- Chris Daniel, attorney

==== Results ====
Republican primary
Party	Candidate	Votes	%
Republican	Chris Daniel	150,612	100.00
Total votes		150,612	100.00

=== General election ===
==== Post-primary endorsements ====
Chris Daniel (R)

Newspapers

- Houston Chronicle

==== Results ====
2026 Harris County District Clerk election
Party	Candidate	Votes	%
Democratic	Darrell Jordan Jr.	803,669	60.59
Republican	Chris Daniel	522,724	39.41
Total votes		1,326,393	100.00

== County Clerk ==
=== Democratic primary ===
==== Candidates ====
===== Nominee =====
- Teneshia Hudspeth, incumbent clerk

==== Results ====
Democratic primary
Party	Candidate	Votes	%
Democratic	Teneshia Hudspeth (incumbent)	299,107	100.00
Total votes		299,107	100.00

=== Republican primary ===
==== Candidates ====
===== Nominee =====
- Mike Wolfe, consultant

===== Eliminated in primary =====
- Lynda Sanchez, transportation business onwer

==== Polling ====
Poll source	Date(s) administered	Sample size	Margin of error	Lynda Sanchez	Mike Wolfe	Undecided
University of Houston	February 3–10, 2026	2,000 (LV)	± 2.19%	14%	20%	66%

==== Results ====
Republican primary
Party	Candidate	Votes	%
Republican	Mike Wolfe	89,269	50.94
Republican	Lynda Sanchez	85,982	49.06
Total votes		175,251	100.00

=== General election ===
==== Post-primary endorsements ====
Teneshia Hudspeth (D)

Newspapers

- Houston Chronicle

==== Results ====
2026 Harris County Clerk election
Party	Candidate	Votes	%
Democratic	Teneshia Hudspeth (incumbent)	831,525	62.64
Republican	Mike Wolfe	495,870	37.36
Total votes		1,327,395	100.00

== County Treasurer ==
=== Democratic primary ===
==== Candidates ====
===== Nominee =====
- Carla Wyatt, incumbent treasurer

==== Results ====
Democratic primary
Party	Candidate	Votes	%
Democratic	Carla L. Wyatt (incumbent)	294,388	100.00
Total votes		294,388	100.00

=== Republican primary ===
==== Candidates ====
===== Nominee =====
- Marc Cowart

===== Eliminated in primary =====
- Hayley Lane Hagan, accounting analyst

==== Endorsements ====
Marc Cowart

Newspapers

- Houston Chronicle

==== Polling ====
Poll source	Date(s) administered	Sample size	Margin of error	Marc Cowart	Hayley Lane Hagan	Undecided
University of Houston	February 3–10, 2026	2,000 (LV)	± 2.19%	13%	12%	75%

==== Results ====
Republican primary
Party	Candidate	Votes	%
Republican	Marc Cowart	109,472	64.67
Republican	Hayley Lane Hagan	59,804	35.33
Total votes		169,276	100.00

=== General election ===
==== Post-primary endorsements ====
Marc Cowart (R)

Newspapers

- Houston Chronicle

==== Results ====
2026 Harris County Treasurer election
Party	Candidate	Votes	%
Democratic	Carla Wyatt (incumbent)	790,879	59.81
Republican	Marc Cowart	531,454	40.19
Total votes		1,322,333	100.00

== Commissioners Court Precinct 2 ==
Adrian Garcia was re-elected in 2022 with 52.7% of the vote.

=== Democratic primary ===
==== Candidates ====
- Adrian Garcia, incumbent commissioner

==== Results ====
Democratic primary
Party	Candidate	Votes	%
Democratic	Adrian Garcia (incumbent)	57,437	100.00
Total votes		57,437	100.00

=== Republican primary ===
==== Candidates ====
- Richard Vega, pastor and candidate in 2022
- Raquel Hernandez, construction business owner

==== Results ====
Republican primary
Party	Candidate	Votes	%
Republican	Richard Vega	20,179	59.90
Republican	Raquel Hernandez Boujorne	13,507	40.10
Total votes		33,686	100.00

=== General election ===
==== Endorsements ====
Adrian Garcia (D)

Newspapers

- Houston Chronicle

==== Polling ====
Poll source	Date(s) administered	Sample size	Margin of error	Adrian Garcia (D)	Richard Vega (R)	Undecided
University of Houston	October 3–8, 2026	624 (LV)	± 3.9%	52%	40%	8%

==== Results ====
2026 Harris County Commissioners Court election, precinct 2
Party	Candidate	Votes	%
Democratic	Adrian Garcia (incumbent)	172,739	65.54
Republican	Richard Vega	90,817	34.46
Total votes		263,556	100.00

== Commissioners Court Precinct 4 ==
Lesley Briones was elected in 2022 with 51.7% of the vote.

=== Democratic primary ===
==== Candidates ====
- Lesley Briones, incumbent commissioner

==== Results ====
Democratic primary
Party	Candidate	Votes	%
Democratic	Lesley Briones (incumbent)	62,652	100.00
Total votes		62,652	100.00

=== Republican primary ===
==== Candidates ====
- Steve Radack, former commissioner from the 3rd precinct (1988–2020)

==== Results ====
Republican primary
Party	Candidate	Votes	%
Republican	Steve Radack	36,282	100.00
Total votes		36,282	100.00

=== General election ===
==== Endorsements ====
Lesley Briones (D)

Newspapers

- Houston Chronicle

==== Polling ====
Poll source	Date(s) administered	Sample size	Margin of error	Lesley Briones (D)	Steve Radack (R)	Undecided
University of Houston	October 3–8, 2026	702 (LV)	± 3.7%	49%	41%	10%

==== Results ====
2026 Harris County Commissioners Court election, precinct 4
Party	Candidate	Votes	%
Democratic	Lesley Briones (incumbent)	189,161	62.30
Republican	Steve Radack	114,401	37.68
Independent	Michelle Gwinn (write-in)	59	0.02
Total votes		303,621	100.00

== Department of Education ==
=== Place 5 ===
==== Democratic primary ====
===== Candidates =====
====== Nominee ======
- Erica Davis, incumbent board member

====== Eliminated in primary ======
- Salvador Serrano, insurance agent

===== Results =====
Democratic primary
Party	Candidate	Votes	%
Democratic	Erica Davis (incumbent)	241,496	75.73
Democratic	Salvador Serrano	77,377	24.27
Total votes		318,873	100.00

==== Republican primary ====
===== Candidates =====
====== Nominee ======
- Sartaj Bal, attorney

===== Results =====
Republican primary
Party	Candidate	Votes	%
Republican	Sartaj Bal	142,065	100.00
Total votes		142,065	100.00

=== General election ===
==== Post-primary endorsements ====
Erica Davis (D)

Newspapers

- Houston Chronicle

==== Results ====
2026 Harris County Department of Education election, place 5
Party	Candidate	Votes	%
Democratic	Erica Davis (incumbent)	852,946	64.42
Republican	Sartaj Bal	471,135	35.58
Total votes		1,324,081	100.00

=== Place 7 ===
==== Democratic primary ====
===== Candidates =====
====== Nominee ======
- Silky Joshi Malik, incumbent board member

===== Results =====
Democratic primary
Party	Candidate	Votes	%
Democratic	Silky Joshi Malik (incumbent)	289,657	100.00
Total votes		289,657	100.00

==== Republican primary ====
===== Candidates =====
====== Nominee ======
- Denise Dick, business consultant

====== Withdrew after primary ======
- Beverly Barrett, educator

====== Eliminated in primary ======
- Madison Guillory, sales representative

===== Results =====
Republican primary
Party	Candidate	Votes	%
Republican	Denise Dick	70,107	43.28
Republican	Beverly Barrett	50,029	30.89
Republican	Madison Guillory	41,836	25.83
Total votes		161,972	100.00

=== General election ===
==== Post-primary endorsements ====
Silky Joshi Malik (D)

Newspapers

- Houston Chronicle

==== Results ====
2026 Harris County Department of Education election, place 7
Party	Candidate	Votes	%
Democratic	Silky Joshi Malik (incumbent)	827,881	62.78
Republican	Denise Dick	490,892	37.22
Total votes		1,318,773	100.00

== County Civil Court ==
=== No. 1 ===
==== Nominees ====
- Jamie King, attorney (Republican)
- Sonia Lopez, incumbent judge (Democratic)

==== Died ====
- Paul Coselli, lawyer (Republican)

=== General election ===
==== Post-primary endorsements ====
Jamie King (R)

Newspapers

- Houston Chronicle

==== Results ====
2026 Harris County Civil Court election, No. 1
Party	Candidate	Votes	%
Democratic	Sonia Lopez (incumbent)	812,045	61.15
Republican	Jamie King	515,908	38.85
Total votes		1,327,953	100.00

=== No. 2 ===
==== Democratic primary ====
===== Candidates =====
====== Nominee ======
- Ebony Williams, lawyer

====== Eliminated in primary ======
- Jim Kovach, incumbent judge

===== Results =====
Democratic primary
Party	Candidate	Votes	%
Democratic	Ebony Williams	209,592	66.33
Democratic	Jim Kovach (incumbent)	106,374	33.67
Total votes		315,966	100.00

==== Republican primary ====
===== Candidates =====
====== Nominee ======
- Mark Montgomery, attorney

=== General election ===
==== Post-primary endorsements ====
Ebony Williams (D)

Newspapers

- Houston Chronicle

==== Results ====
2026 Harris County Civil Court election, No. 2
Party	Candidate	Votes	%
Democratic	Ebony Williams	811,739	61.46
Republican	Mark Montgomery	508,942	38.54
Total votes		1,320,681	100.00

=== No. 3 ===
==== Democratic primary ====
===== Candidates =====
====== Nominee ======
- Lashawn Williams, incumbent judge

====== Eliminated in primary ======
- Miro Mendiola, attorney

===== Results =====
Democratic primary
Party	Candidate	Votes	%
Democratic	Lashawn Williams (incumbent)	226,435	72.31
Democratic	Miro Mendiola	86,702	27.69
Total votes		313,137	100.00

==== Republican primary ====
===== Candidates =====
====== Nominee ======
- Israel Garcia

=== General election ===
==== Post-primary endorsements ====
LaShawn Williams (D)

Newspapers

- Houston Chronicle

==== Results ====
2026 Harris County Civil Court election, No. 3
Party	Candidate	Votes	%
Democratic	LaShawn Williams (incumbent)	813,605	61.66
Republican	Israel Garcia	505,941	38.34
Total votes		1,319,546	100.00

=== No. 4 ===
==== Nominees ====
- John Donovan, attorney and mediator (Republican)
- Monica Singh, incumbent judge (Democratic)

=== General election ===
==== Post-primary endorsements ====
Monica Singh (D)

Newspapers

- Houston Chronicle

==== Results ====
2026 Harris County Civil Court election, No. 4
Party	Candidate	Votes	%
Democratic	Monica Singh (incumbent)	818,809	62.17
Republican	John Donovan	498,316	37.83
Total votes		1,317,125	100.00

=== No. 5 ===
==== Nominees ====
- Richard Lanier Fason (Republican)
- Jermaine Thomas (Democratic)

=== General election ===
==== Post-primary endorsements ====
Jermaine Thomas (D)

Newspapers

- Houston Chronicle

==== Results ====
2026 Harris County Civil Court election, No. 5
Party	Candidate	Votes	%
Democratic	Jermaine Thomas	817,736	62.20
Republican	Richard Lanier Fason	497,035	37.80
Total votes		1,314,771	100.00

== County Criminal Court ==
=== No. 1 ===
==== Nominees ====
- Alex Salgado, incumbent judge (Democratic)
- Erin Swanson, attorney (Republican)

=== General election ===
==== Post-primary endorsements ====
Alex Salgado (D)

Newspapers

- Houston Chronicle

==== Results ====
2026 Harris County Criminal Court election, No. 1
Party	Candidate	Votes	%
Democratic	Alex Salgado (incumbent)	821,006	62.28
Republican	Erin Swanson	497,164	37.72
Total votes		1,318,170	100.00

=== No. 2 ===
==== Nominees ====
- Matt Alford, attorney (Republican)
- Matthew Ruben Perez, attorney (Democratic)

=== General election ===
==== Post-primary endorsements ====
Matthew Ruben Perez (D)

Newspapers

- Houston Chronicle

==== Results ====
2026 Harris County Criminal Court election, No. 2
Party	Candidate	Votes	%
Democratic	Matthew Ruben Perez	816,087	62.02
Republican	Matt Alford	499,834	37.98
Total votes		1,315,921	100.00

=== No. 3 ===
==== Republican primary ====
===== Candidates =====
====== Nominee ======
- Leslie Johnson, incumbent judge

==== Democratic primary ====
===== Candidates =====
====== Nominee ======
- Carlos Alberto Aguayo, attorney

====== Withdrawn ======
- Anna Eady, attorney

=== General election ===
==== Post-primary endorsements ====
Carlos Aguayo (D)

Newspapers

- Houston Chronicle

==== Results ====
2026 Harris County Criminal Court election, No. 3
Party	Candidate	Votes	%
Democratic	Carlos Alberto Aguayo	811,411	61.69
Republican	Leslie Johnson (incumbent)	503,843	38.31
Total votes		1,315,254	100.00

=== No. 4 ===
==== Nominees ====
- Rebecca Philips Aceto, attorney (Republican)
- Shannon B. Baldwin, incumbent judge (Democratic)

=== General election ===
==== Post-primary endorsements ====
Shannon B. Baldwin (D)

Newspapers

- Houston Chronicle

==== Results ====
2026 Harris County Criminal Court election, No. 4
Party	Candidate	Votes	%
Democratic	Shannon B. Baldwin (incumbent)	814,567	62.00
Republican	Rebecca Philips Aceto	499,239	38.00
Total votes		1,313,806	100.00

=== No. 5 ===
==== Nominees ====
- David M. Fleischer, incumbent judge (Democratic)
- Stella Stevens, attorney (Republican)

=== General election ===
==== Post-primary endorsements ====
Stella Stevens (R)

Newspapers

- Houston Chronicle

==== Results ====
2026 Harris County Criminal Court election, No. 5
Party	Candidate	Votes	%
Democratic	David M. Fleischer (incumbent)	791,608	60.33
Republican	Stella Stevens	520,450	39.67
Total votes		1,312,058	100.00

=== No. 6 ===
==== Nominees ====
- Kelley Andrews, incumbent judge (Democratic)
- Joshua Normand, attorney and prosecutor (Republican)

=== General election ===
==== Post-primary endorsements ====
Kelley Andrews (D)

Newspapers

- Houston Chronicle

==== Results ====
2026 Harris County Criminal Court election, No. 6
Party	Candidate	Votes	%
Democratic	Kelley Andrews (incumbent)	817,886	62.33
Republican	Joshua Normand	494,400	37.67
Total votes		1,312,286	100.00

=== No. 7 ===
==== Democratic primary ====
===== Candidates =====
====== Nominee ======
- Andrew A. Wright, incumbent judge

====== Eliminated in primary ======
- Rustin Foroutan, attorney
- Jorge Garcia Diaz, attorney

===== Results =====
Democratic primary
Party	Candidate	Votes	%
Democratic	Andrew Wright (incumbent)	171,278	54.80
Democratic	Jorge Garcia Diaz	110,792	35.45
Democratic	Rustin Foroutan	30,470	9.75
Total votes		312,540	100.00

==== Republican primary ====
===== Candidates =====
====== Nominee ======
- Thomas Adam Brodrick, attorney

=== General election ===
==== Post-primary endorsements ====
Andrew A. Wright (D)

Newspapers

- Houston Chronicle

==== Results ====
2026 Harris County Criminal Court election, No. 7
Party	Candidate	Votes	%
Democratic	Andrew A. Wright (incumbent)	811,540	61.87
Republican	Thomas Adam Brodrick	500,207	38.13
Total votes		1,311,747	100.00

=== No. 8 ===
==== Nominees ====
- Victor Flores, prosecutor (Republican)
- Erika Ramirez, incumbent judge (Democratic)

=== General election ===
==== Post-primary endorsements ====
Erika Ramirez (D)

Newspapers

- Houston Chronicle

==== Results ====
2026 Harris County Criminal Court election, No. 8
Party	Candidate	Votes	%
Democratic	Erika Ramirez (incumbent)	816,845	62.11
Republican	Victor Flores	498,339	37.89
Total votes		1,315,184	100.00

=== No. 9 ===
==== Nominees ====
- Xavier Alfaro, attorney (Republican)
- Toria J. Finch, incumbent judge (Democratic)

=== General election ===
==== Post-primary endorsements ====
Toria J. Finch (D)

Newspapers

- Houston Chronicle

==== Results ====
2026 Harris County Criminal Court election, No. 9
Party	Candidate	Votes	%
Democratic	Toria J. Finch (incumbent)	807,657	61.61
Republican	Xavier Alfaro	503,312	38.39
Total votes		1,310,969	100.00

=== No. 10 ===
==== Nominees ====
- Bao Hoang, lawyer (Republican)
- Juanita A. Jackson, incumbent judge (Democratic)

=== General election ===
==== Post-primary endorsements ====
Juanita A. Jackson (D)

Newspapers

- Houston Chronicle

==== Results ====
2026 Harris County Criminal Court election, No. 10
Party	Candidate	Votes	%
Democratic	Juanita A. Jackson (incumbent)	822,429	62.61
Republican	Bao Hoang	491,098	37.39
Total votes		1,313,527	100.00

=== No. 11 ===
==== Nominees ====
- Elizabeth Buss, attorney (Republican)
- Sedrick T. Walker II, incumbent judge (Democratic)

=== General election ===
==== Post-primary endorsements ====
Sedrick T. Walker II (D)

Newspapers

- Houston Chronicle

==== Results ====
2026 Harris County Criminal Court election, No. 11
Party	Candidate	Votes	%
Democratic	Sedrick T. Walker II (incumbent)	806,724	61.55
Republican	Elizabeth Buss	503,958	38.45
Total votes		1,310,682	100.00

=== No. 12 ===
==== Nominees ====
- Anna Emmons, prosecutor (Republican)
- Ashley Mayes Guice, incumbent judge (Democratic)

=== General election ===
==== Post-primary endorsements ====
Ashley Mayes Guice (D)

Newspapers

- Houston Chronicle

==== Results ====
2026 Harris County Criminal Court election, No. 12
Party	Candidate	Votes	%
Democratic	Ashley Mayes Guice (incumbent)	811,478	61.96
Republican	Anna Emmons	498,167	38.04
Total votes		1,309,645	100.00

=== No. 13 ===
==== Nominees ====
- Amber Cox, attorney (Republican)
- Raul Rodriguez, incumbent judge (Democratic)

=== General election ===
==== Post-primary endorsements ====
Raul Rodriguez (D)

Newspapers

- Houston Chronicle

==== Results ====
2026 Harris County Criminal Court election, No. 13
Party	Candidate	Votes	%
Democratic	Raul Rodriguez (incumbent)	815,167	62.11
Republican	Amber Cox	497,381	37.89
Total votes		1,312,548	100.00

=== No. 14 ===
==== Republican primary ====
===== Candidates =====
====== Nominee ======
- Jessica N. Padilla, incumbent judge

==== Democratic primary ====
===== Candidates =====
====== Nominee ======
- Yahaira Quezada, associate judge

====== Eliminated in primary ======
- James Hu, attorney

===== Results =====
Democratic primary
Party	Candidate	Votes	%
Democratic	Yahaira Quezada	169,181	54.56
Democratic	James Hu	140,912	45.44
Total votes		310,093	100.00

=== General election ===
==== Post-primary endorsements ====
Jessica Padilla (R)

Newspapers

- Houston Chronicle

==== Results ====
2026 Harris County Criminal Court election, No. 14
Party	Candidate	Votes	%
Democratic	Yahaira Quezada	780,205	59.54
Republican	Jessica N. Padilla (incumbent)	530,232	40.46
Total votes		1,310,437	100.00

=== No. 15 ===
==== Nominees ====
- Tonya Jones, incumbent judge (Democratic)
- Stephen C. St. Martin, attorney (Republican)

=== General election ===
==== Post-primary endorsements ====
Tonya Jones (D)

Newspapers

- Houston Chronicle

==== Results ====
2026 Harris County Criminal Court election, No. 15
Party	Candidate	Votes	%
Democratic	Tonya Jones (incumbent)	811,768	61.88
Republican	Stephen C. St. Martin	500,170	38.12
Total votes		1,311,938	100.00

== Probate Court ==
=== No. 1 ===
==== Nominees ====
- Jerry Simoneaux, incumbent judge (Democratic)
- Loyd Wright, attorney (Republican)

=== General election ===
==== Post-primary endorsements ====
Jerry Simoneaux (D)

Newspapers

- Houston Chronicle

==== Results ====
2026 Harris County Probate Court election, No. 1
Party	Candidate	Votes	%
Democratic	Jerry Simoneaux (incumbent)	816,611	62.21
Republican	Loyd Wright	496,144	37.79
Total votes		1,312,755	100.00

=== No. 2 ===
==== Nominees ====
- Pamela Medina, incumbent judge (Democratic)
- Paul Shanklin, attorney (Republican)

=== General election ===
==== Post-primary endorsements ====
Pamela Medina (D)

Newspapers

- Houston Chronicle

==== Results ====
2026 Harris County Probate Court election, No. 2
Party	Candidate	Votes	%
Democratic	Pamela Medina (incumbent)	826,628	62.89
Republican	Paul Shanklin	487,755	37.11
Total votes		1,314,383	100.00

=== No. 3 ===
==== Nominees ====
- Jason Cox, incumbent judge (Democratic)
- Ronald Schramm, retired attorney (Republican)

=== General election ===
==== Post-primary endorsements ====
Jason Cox (D)

Newspapers

- Houston Chronicle

==== Results ====
2026 Harris County Probate Court election, No. 3
Party	Candidate	Votes	%
Democratic	Jason Cox (incumbent)	821,456	62.67
Republican	Ronald Schramm	489,394	37.33
Total votes		1,310,850	100.00

=== No. 4 ===
==== Democratic primary ====
===== Candidates =====
====== Nominee ======
- James Horwitz, incumbent judge

====== Eliminated in primary ======
- Lema May Mousilli, attorney

===== Results =====
Democratic primary
Party	Candidate	Votes	%
Democratic	James Horwitz (incumbent)	178,876	58.45
Democratic	Lema May Mousilli	127,134	41.55
Total votes		306,010	100.00

==== Republican primary ====
===== Candidates =====
====== Nominee ======
- Kevin Fulton, attorney

=== General election ===
==== Post-primary endorsements ====
James Horwitz (D)

Newspapers

- Houston Chronicle

==== Results ====
2026 Harris County Probate Court election, No. 4
Party	Candidate	Votes	%
Democratic	James Horwitz (incumbent)	814,235	62.12
Republican	Kevin Fulton	496,456	37.88
Total votes		1,310,691	100.00

== Harris Central Appraisal District ==
This office is elected at-large in nonpartisan elections. If necessary, a runoff election will be held on December 12.

=== Place 1 ===
==== Candidates ====
===== Declared =====
- Kathy Blueford-Daniels, incumbent director
- Beverly Barrett, educator

==== Endorsements ====
Kathy Blueford-Daniels

Newspapers

- Houston Chronicle

==== Results ====
2026 Harris Central Appraisal District election, place 1
Candidate	Votes	%
Beverly Barrett	544,166	57.66
Kathy Blueford-Daniels (incumbent)	399,539	42.34
Total votes	943,705	100.00

=== Place 2 ===
==== Candidates ====
===== Declared =====
- Chris Ehlinger, industrial systems engineer
- Claudio Gutierrez, retired community banker
- Jourdyn Wilson, college graduate

==== Endorsements ====
Claudio Gutierrez

Newspapers

- Houston Chronicle

==== Results ====
2026 Harris Central Appraisal District election, place 2
Candidate	Votes	%
Claudio Gutierrez	348,403	37.60
Jourdyn Wilson	299,348	32.31
Chris Ehlinger	278,812	30.09
Total votes	926,563	100.00

=== Place 3 ===
==== Candidates ====
===== Declared =====
- Ericka McCrutcheon, incumbent director
- Cris Moses, realtor
- Jesus Nieto, community organizer

==== Endorsements ====
Cris Moses

Newspapers

- Houston Chronicle

==== Results ====
2026 Harris Central Appraisal District election, place 3
Candidate	Votes	%
Ericka McCrutcheon (incumbent)	387,019	42.47
Jesus Nieto	278,707	30.58
Cris Moses	245,589	26.95
Total votes	911,315	100.00

== Party chair ==
=== Democratic Party chair ===
==== Candidates ====
===== Declared =====
- Mike Doyle, incumbent chair
- Traci Gibson, attorney

==== Results ====
2026 Harris County Democratic Party chair election
Party	Candidate	Votes	%
Democratic	Traci Gibson	207,963	66.80
Democratic	Mike Doyle (incumbent)	103,350	33.20
Total votes		311,313	100.00

=== Republican Party chair ===
==== Candidates ====
===== Advanced to runoff =====
- Don Hooper, retiree
- Cindy Siegel, incumbent chair

===== Eliminated in first round =====
- Michelle Bouchard, consultant

==== Results ====
2026 Harris County Republican Party chair election
Party	Candidate	Votes	%
Republican	Cindy Siegel (incumbent)	84,787	49.68
Republican	Don Hooper	56,366	33.02
Republican	Michelle Bouchard	29,528	17.30
Total votes		170,681	100.00

==== Runoff ====
===== Results =====
2026 Harris County Republican Party chair runoff election
Party	Candidate	Votes	%
Republican	Cindy Siegel (incumbent)	77,775	58.45
Republican	Don Hooper	55,277	41.55
Total votes		133,052	100.00
