= Tommy Merritt =

American politician

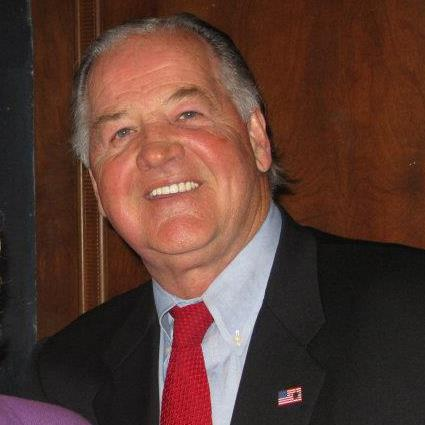

Member of the Texas House of Representatives from the 7th district
- In office January 14, 1997 – January 11, 2011
- Preceded by: Jerry Yost
- Succeeded by: David Simpson

Personal details
- Born: Thomas Charles Merritt; February 27, 1948 (age 78) Kilgore, Texas, U.S.
- Party: Republican
- Spouse: Janet Merritt
- Children: 3
- Education: Kilgore College; Texas Christian University (BBA, 1970)
- Profession: Businessman
- Website: tommymerritt.com

Thomas Charles Merritt (born February 27, 1948) is an American businessman from Longview, Texas and a Republican former member of the Texas House of Representatives. Merritt represented District 7 from January 1997 until January 2011. In March 2010, he lost the Republican nomination to David Simpson.

== Personal life ==
Merritt is a native East Texan born in Kilgore. After graduating from high school, he attended Kilgore College and then graduated in 1970 with a Bachelor of Business Administration from Texas Christian University in Fort Worth. He and his wife, Janet, have three children, Missy, Meredith, and Thomas. Tommy Merritt is a devout Christian and member of Kilgore First Baptist Church, the Businessmen's Bible Club at the First Baptist Church in Longview, and he also attends the BarNone Cowboy Church in Tatum, Texas.

== Business career ==
From 1971 to 1974, Merritt worked as an inspector for the United States Postal Service. In 1976, he founded Gregg Industrial Insulators, Inc. It was admitted to the OSHA, Voluntary Protection Program, and is a multi-million dollar company which employs more than five hundred workers. From 1986 to 1993 Merritt served as one of the directors of the Gregg County Appraisal Board, which led to his appointment by Governor Bill Clements to the Sabine River Authority in 1990.

== Political career ==
After Republican Jerry Yost decided not to run for reelection in 1996, Merritt entered the Republican primary and won more than 62 percent of the vote. Merritt went on to win a seat in the Texas House of Representatives after being unopposed in the 1996 general election; in 2008 he was elected to a seventh term. Tommy Merritt co-authored the bill which added "Under God" to the Texas Pledge.

Merritt served on numerous committees in the House:

- Committee on Energy Resources (Chair and Vice Chair)
- Committee on Public Safety (Chairman)
- Committee on Local and Consent Calendars (Member)
- Committee on Redistricting (Member)
- Committee on Transportation (Member)

Throughout his tenure in the House, Merritt built a solid conservative record on issues including opposition to gun control, same-sex marriage, and abortion, as well as lower government spending and taxes.

In 2009, Merritt authored "campus carry" legislation allowing concealed handgun license holders to carry their weapons on college campuses, while in 2007, Merritt authored legislation waiving or reducing concealed license handgun fees for military members and veterans.

Merritt strongly opposed same-sex marriage. In 2005, he co-authored the state constitutional amendment that defined marriage as a union of one man and one woman. Merritt also co-authored bills to keep the state from recognizing same-sex civil unions in 2003. 2001, 1999, and 1997.

While a member of the Texas House, Merritt also strongly opposed abortion, co-authoring bills to issue Choose Life license plates in 2009, to institute legal penalties for harm to a fetus in 2003, to ban human cloning in 2007, and to require parental consent for minors to obtain abortions in 2005. 1999, and 1997.

In 2003, Merritt co-authored legislation requiring Texas students to recite the Pledge of Allegiance as well as a bill to guarantee a daily moment of silence in Texas public schools. In 2007, Merritt co-authored legislation to include the phrase "Under God" in the Texas Pledge of Allegiance

Merritt also had a strong record of fighting for lower spending and lower taxes.

In 2009, Merritt co-authored legislation to limit growth in state spending to the rate of population growth plus the rate of inflation. That same year, he co-authored a proposed constitutional amendment requiring a 2/3 vote of both houses of the Legislature to raise taxes.

Real property tax reform was another of Merritt's priorities in the Texas House. In 1999, he authored a proposed constitutional amendment to cap property taxes. In 2005 he authored both a bill and a proposed constitutional amendment to bring property tax relief to Texans. In 2009, he again authored legislation to reform property tax appraisals and proposed a constitutional amendment to cap property appraisal increases at the rate of inflation.

In 2009, Merritt co-authored legislation to reform the state's franchise tax, exempting more small businesses. Merritt also authored or co-authored numerous bills to overturn and subsequently prohibit inheritance taxes in Texas in 2005 and 2003.

Merritt also authored the bill establishing the first Texas Legislative Medal of Honor in this history of the state.

=== Candidacy for Speaker of the House ===
In November 2008, Merritt announced his candidacy for Speaker of the Texas House of Representatives. After a meeting, ten Republicans running for Speaker had decided on Joe Straus as the Republican candidate. Merritt stated he was willing to end his own candidacy to support Straus, who won a unanimous vote for Speaker.

=== Loss of Republican nomination ===
In March 2010, Merritt lost the Republican nomination for District 7 to David Simpson, former mayor of Avinger. Simpson received 53 percent of the primary vote and was then unopposed in the general election.

Meanwhile, Simpson, who beat back Merritt's attempt in 2012 to return to the House, was a candidate in January 2013 for Speaker of the Texas House of Representatives against Joe Straus of San Antionio, whom Merritt had supported in 2009, when Straus ousted the previous Republican speaker, Tom Craddick of Midland.

== Election results ==
=== 2012 ===
Texas Republican primary election, 2012: House District 7
Party	Candidate	Votes	%
Republican	David Simpson (Incumbent)	10,258	61.63
Republican	Tommy Merritt	6,384	38.36

=== 2010 ===
Texas Republican primary election, 2010: House District 7
Party	Candidate	Votes	%
Republican	David Simpson	7,891	52.87
Republican	Tommy Merritt (Incumbent)	7,032	47.12

=== 2008 ===
Texas general election, 2008: House District 7
Party	Candidate	Votes	%
Republican	Tommy Merritt (Incumbent)	40,671	88.34
Libertarian	Joey R. Stroman	5,368	11.65

=== 2006 ===
Texas general election, 2006: House District 7
Party	Candidate	Votes	%
Republican	Tommy Merritt (Incumbent)	20,810	68.43
Democratic	Patrick Franklin	8,701	28.61
Libertarian	Jonathan A. Rasco	897	2.94

=== 2004 ===
Texas general election, 2004: House District 7
Party	Candidate	Votes	%
Republican	Tommy Merritt (Incumbent)	40,787	100

=== 2002 ===
Texas general election, 2002: House District 7
Party	Candidate	Votes	%
Republican	Tommy Merritt (Incumbent)	26,265	100

=== 2000 ===
Texas general election, 2000: House District 7
Party	Candidate	Votes	%
Republican	Tommy Merritt (Incumbent)	29,574	100

=== 1998 ===
Texas general election, 1998: House District 7
Party	Candidate	Votes	%
Republican	Tommy Merritt (Incumbent)	18,395	100

=== 1996 ===
Texas general election, 1996: House District 7
Party	Candidate	Votes	%
Republican	Tommy Merritt	26,351	100

Texas House of Representatives
Preceded by Jerry Yost	Texas State Representative from District 7; 1997–2010	Succeeded by David Simpson
