= 2026 Bexar County District Attorney election =

- November 3, 2026
Candidate	Luz Elena Chapa	Ashley Foster
Party	Democratic	Republican
Popular vote	388,364	216,605
Percentage	61.3%	34.2%
District Attorney before election
Joe Gonzales
Democratic
Elected District Attorney
Luz Elena Chapa
Democratic

The 2026 Bexar County District Attorney election was held on November 3, 2026, to elect the district attorney of Bexar County, Texas. Primary elections were held on March 3, and a primary runoff election was held on May 26. Incumbent district attorney Joe Gonzales retired after serving two consecutive four-year terms.

== Democratic primary ==
=== Candidates ===
==== Nominee ====
- Luz Elena Chapa, former 4th court of appeals judge

==== Eliminated in runoff ====
- Jane Davis, assistant district attorney

==== Eliminated in primary ====
- Jim Bethke, attorney
- Meredith Chacon, attorney
- Veronica Legarreta, attorney and candidate for the 187th district court in 2018 and 2022
- Shannon Locke, defense attorney
- Meli Carrión Powers, chief of the family violence division of the District Attorney's Office
- Oscar Salinas, prosecutor

==== Declined ====
- Joe Gonzales, incumbent district attorney
- Ron Rangel, state district judge for the 379th district court

=== First round ===
==== Endorsements ====
Jane Davis

Newspapers

- San Antonio Express-News

==== Results ====
Democratic primary
Party	Candidate	Votes	%
Democratic	Luz Elena Chapa	37,623	23.80
Democratic	Jane Davis	28,670	18.14
Democratic	Shannon Locke	22,137	14.01
Democratic	Veronica I. Legarreta	18,715	11.84
Democratic	Oscar Salinas	18,051	11.42
Democratic	Meredith M. Chacon	14,119	8.93
Democratic	Mari Carrion Powers	9,956	6.30
Democratic	James "Jim" Bethke	8,790	5.56
Total votes		158,061	100.00

=== Runoff ===
==== Endorsements ====
Jane Davis

Local officials

- Joe Gonzales, incumbent district attorney

Individuals

- Jim Bethke, attorney and former candidate for this seat
- Veronica Legarreta, attorney and former candidate for this seat
- Shannon Locke, defense attorney and former candidate for this seat
- Meli Carrión Powers, chief of the family violence division of the District Attorney's Office and former candidate for this seat

==== Results ====
Democratic primary runoff
Party	Candidate	Votes	%
Democratic	Luz Elena Chapa	28,430	50.84
Democratic	Jane Davis	27,496	49.16
Total votes		55,926	100.00

== Republican primary ==
=== Candidates ===
==== Nominee ====
- Ashley Foster, prosecutor

=== Results ===
Republican primary
Party	Candidate	Votes	%
Republican	Ashley Foster	63,276	100.00
Total votes		63,276	100.00

== Independents ==
=== Declared ===
- Jason Wolff, trial attorney

== General election ==
=== Results ===
2026 Bexar County District Attorney election
Party	Candidate	Votes	%
Democratic	Luz Elena Chapa	388,364	61.25
Republican	Ashley Foster	216,605	34.16
Independent	Jason Wolff	29,093	4.59
Total votes		634,062	100.00
