= 2026 Bexar County Judge election =

- November 3, 2026
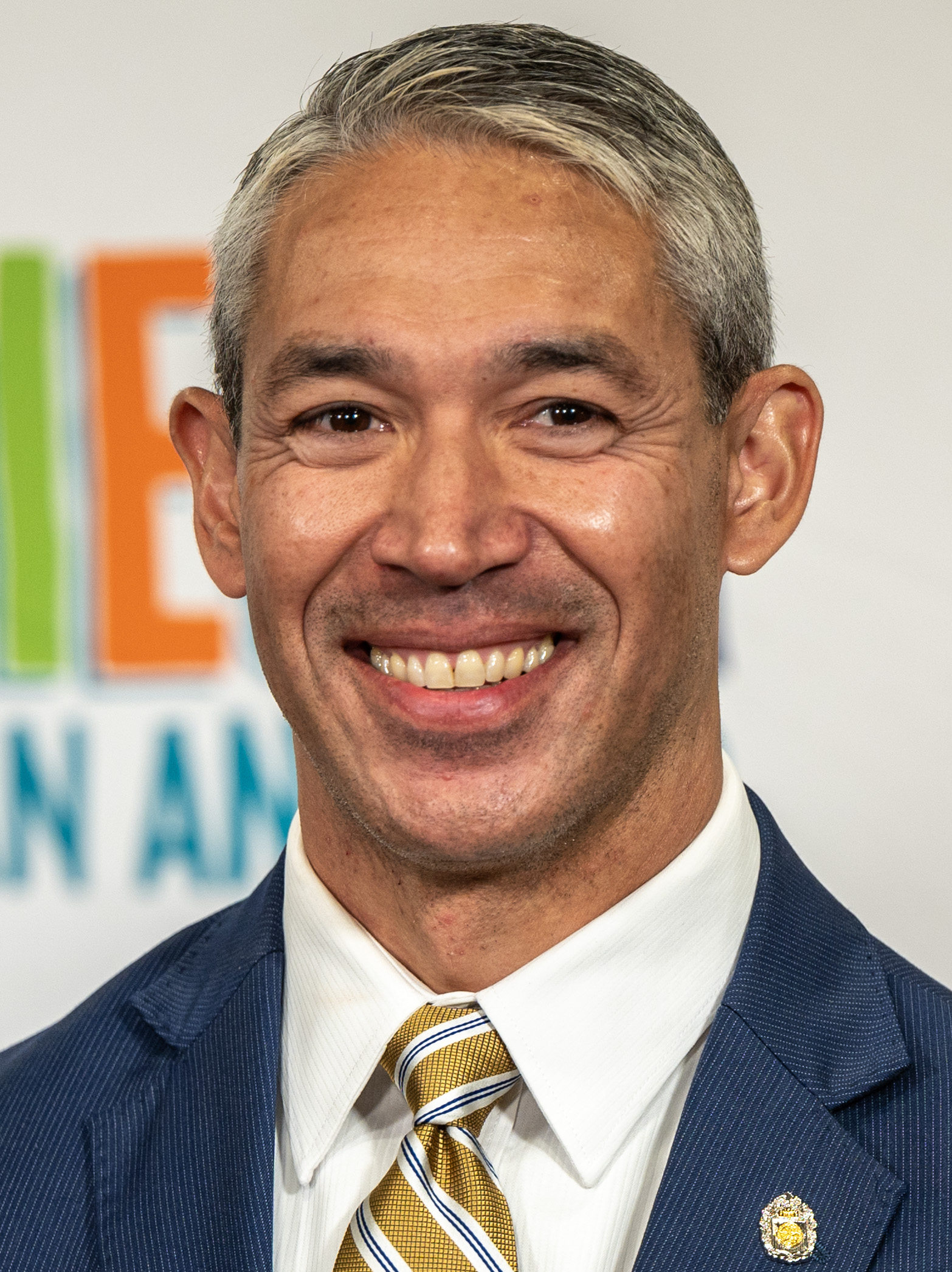

Candidate	Ron Nirenberg	Patrick Von Dohlen
Party	Democratic	Republican
Popular vote	427,477	214,872
Percentage	66.5%	33.5%
- Results by precinct Nirenberg: 50–60% 60–70% 70–80% 80–90% >90% Von Dohlen: 50–60% 60–70% 70–80% 80–90% >90% Tie: 50% No votes
County Judge before election
Peter Sakai
Democratic
Elected County Judge
Ron Nirenberg
Democratic

The 2026 Bexar County Judge election was held on November 3, 2026, to elect the county judge of Bexar County, Texas. Primary elections were held on March 3. Incumbent judge Peter Sakai ran for re-election to a second consecutive four-year term. He lost to Ron Nirenberg in the Democratic primary election.

== Democratic primary ==
Ron Nirenberg, a former mayor of San Antonio, confirmed that he was considering a primary challenge to Sakai in October 2025. He officially launched his bid in mid-November.

=== Candidates ===
==== Nominee ====
- Ron Nirenberg, former mayor of San Antonio (2017–2025)

==== Eliminated in primary ====
- Peter Sakai, incumbent judge

=== Endorsements ===
Ron Nirenberg

Newspapers

- San Antonio Express-News

=== Results ===
Democratic primary
Party	Candidate	Votes	%
Democratic	Ron Nirenberg	111,719	62.20
Democratic	Peter Sakai (incumbent)	67,890	37.80
Total votes		179,609	100.00

== Republican primary ==
=== Candidates ===
==== Nominee ====
- Patrick Von Dohlen, financial adviser and candidate for San Antonio City Council in 2017, 2019, and 2021

=== Results ===
Republican primary
Party	Candidate	Votes	%
Republican	Patrick Von Dohlen	64,167	100.00
Total votes		64,167	100.00

== General election ==
=== Results ===
2026 Bexar County Judge election
Party	Candidate	Votes	%
Democratic	Ron Nirenberg	427,477	66.55
Republican	Patrick Von Dohlen	214,872	33.45
Total votes		642,349	100.00
