= Abbie Kamin =

Houston City Council member

Member of the Houston City Council
- Incumbent
- Assumed office January 2, 2020
- Preceded by: Ellen Cohen
- Constituency: District C

Personal details
- Party: Democratic
- Education: Tulane University
- Occupation: Civil rights attorney

Abbie Kamin is an American politician and civil rights attorney who represents District C on the Houston City Council in Houston, Texas. She was first elected in 2019, and re-elected in 2023.

== Early life and education ==
Kamin was born in Houston; her grandparents owned a small business in the area, and her father is also a small business owner. She attended The Emery/Weiner School in Houston and studied at Tulane University. She earned a J.D. degree and practiced law with a focus on general civil litigation and civil rights litigation.

== Legal career and advocacy ==
Kamin served as associate regional director of the Anti-Defamation League’s Southwest Regional Office, where she oversaw civil rights programming and community partnerships.

Kamin served on the Mayor’s Commission Against Gun Violence prior to joining the city council, contributing to recommendations on gun-violence prevention.

== Houston City Council ==
Kamin ran for the open District C seat on the Houston City Council in the 2019 municipal elections. She advanced from the November 5, 2019 general election to a runoff and defeated Shelley Kennedy in the December 14, 2019 runoff with 59.4% of the vote, taking office on January 2, 2020. District C covers parts of central and west Houston, including areas such as the Heights, Montrose, Meyerland and Greenway/Upper Kirby. She was re-elected in the November 7, 2023 general election, receiving about 73% of the vote against two challengers.

She was a prominent advocate for establishing a paid parental leave policy for eligible city employees.

== County attorney bid ==
In December 2025, Kamin filed to run for Harris County attorney, triggering Texas' resign-to-run law and prompting her to resign from the Houston City Council District C seat.

== Electoral history ==
Houston City Council District C election, 2019 (runoff)
Party	Candidate	Votes	%	±%
Nonpartisan	Abbie Kamin	19,552	59.4	
Nonpartisan	Shelley Kennedy	13,364	40.6	

Houston City Council District C election, 2023
Party	Candidate	Votes	%	±%
Nonpartisan	Abbie Kamin	27,682	73.2	
Nonpartisan	Felix Cisneros	5,163	13.7	
Nonpartisan	Perata Bradley	4,961	13.1	

== Personal life ==
Kamin was born and raised in Houston, Texas. She is married and has one child. She is Jewish.
