= Texas Cannabis Collective =

Texas Cannabis Collective is a cannabis rights activism group founded in 2016 in the U.S. state of Texas. As of 2022, it was headed by Austin Zamhariri, also called Daryoush Austin Zamhariri, a resident of the Fort Worth area.

The organization also serves as a news source for cannabis-related information.
