= Frank Collazo Jr. =

American politician (1931–2023)

Member of the Texas House of Representatives from the 7-C district
- In office January 11, 1977 – January 11, 1983

Member of the Texas House of Representatives from the 23rd district
- In office January 11, 1983 – January 12, 1993

Personal details
- Born: June 10, 1931 Beaumont, Texas, U.S.
- Died: December 19, 2023 (aged 92)
- Party: Democratic
- Spouse: Margaret
- Education: Lamar University

Frank Collazo Jr. (June 10, 1931 – December 19, 2023) was an American politician. He served as a Democratic member for the 7-C and 23rd district of the Texas House of Representatives.

== Life and career ==
Frank Collazo Jr. was born in Beaumont, Texas. He attended Lamar University. He served in the Texas House of Representatives from 1977 to 1993. Collazo died on December 19, 2023, at the age of 92.
