= Criminal Justice Policy Council =

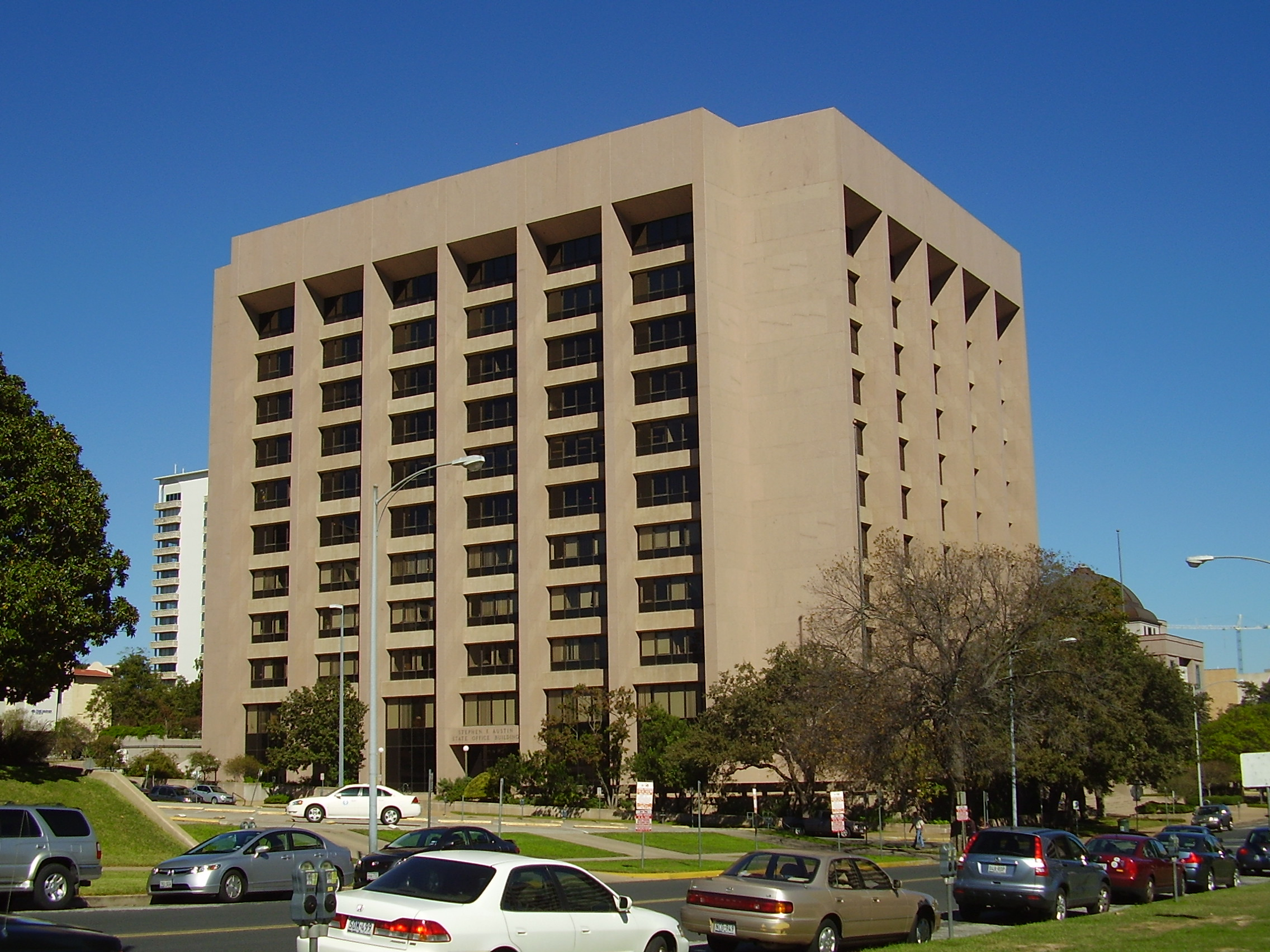
The Stephen F. Austin State Office Building, which housed the council

The Criminal Justice Policy Council (CJPC) was a state agency of the Government of Texas. The agency was located in Suite 1029 in the Stephen F. Austin State Office Building in Downtown Austin, Texas. The agency, established in 1983, provided policy analysis to the Governor of Texas and the Texas Legislature to review policies regarding corrections of adults and juveniles.

Governor Rick Perry disbanded the program in 2003.
