= Tommy Calvert Jr. =

American politician

Tommy Calvert, Jr

Bexar County Commissioner, Precinct 4
- Incumbent
- Assumed office January 1, 2015
- Preceded by: Tommy Adkisson

Personal details
- Born: San Antonio, Texas
- Party: Democratic
- Education: Tufts University
- Occupation: Radio station manager
- Website: https://www.tommycalvert.com

Tommy Ray Calvert, Jr. is an American politician and community advocate. He has been Bexar County Commissioner, Precinct 4 since 2015, when he became the first black member of the Bexar County Commissioners Court. He was reelected to a third term in 2022.

== Early life and education ==
Tommy Calvert, Jr. graduated from high school at St. Mary's Hall. He is the son of community activist Tommy Calvert, Sr., who is president of the nationwide nonprofit Neighborhoods First Alliance, and who was involved in the Community Reinvestment Act of 1977. His mother is Val Calvert, head of the business department at San Antonio College.

While enrolled at Tufts University, Calvert worked as an abolitionist against modern-day slavery. As a sophomore, he won a seat on the university's board of trustees where he successfully advocated to get its teacher's retirement fund, TIAA-CREF, to divest from Talisman Energy, which was viewed by abolitionists as "complicit in Sudanese genocide." Calvert was also board president of nonprofit Abolish Slavery Coalition.

After graduating from Tufts, Calvert became chief of external operations of the American Anti-Slavery Group and traveled to South Sudan and Myanmar to fight against human trafficking.

== Career ==
=== Politics ===
At the age of 25, Calvert filed as one of several candidates for the US District 21 congressional seat in 2006. In 2014, he was elected as Bexar County Commissioner for Precinct 4 with 55% of the vote, succeeding Tommy Adkisson who chose not to run for reelection after 16 years in that office. His precinct includes most of downtown San Antonio and the county's East Side.

When taking office as County Commissioner, one of his major goals was to create an urban farm behind Wheatley Middle School on the Eastside of San Antonio. He helped develop plans for this project with the Texas A&M AgriLife Extension program. In October 2020, a groundbreaking ceremony was held for this project, dubbed the Greenies Urban Farm, which is located on land formerly belonging to Union Pacific Railroad. By the end of that year, 10,000 pounds of produce from the garden had already been distributed to alleviate the strains of the pandemic.

Calvert has repeatedly co-hosted the Bexar County 2nd Chance Job Fair with the Bexar County Re-Entry Center connecting justice-involved individuals with jobs and resources.

=== Other ===
Calvert is the founder and general manager of KROV-FM.
