= David Simpson (Texas politician) =

American politician

David Philip Simpson
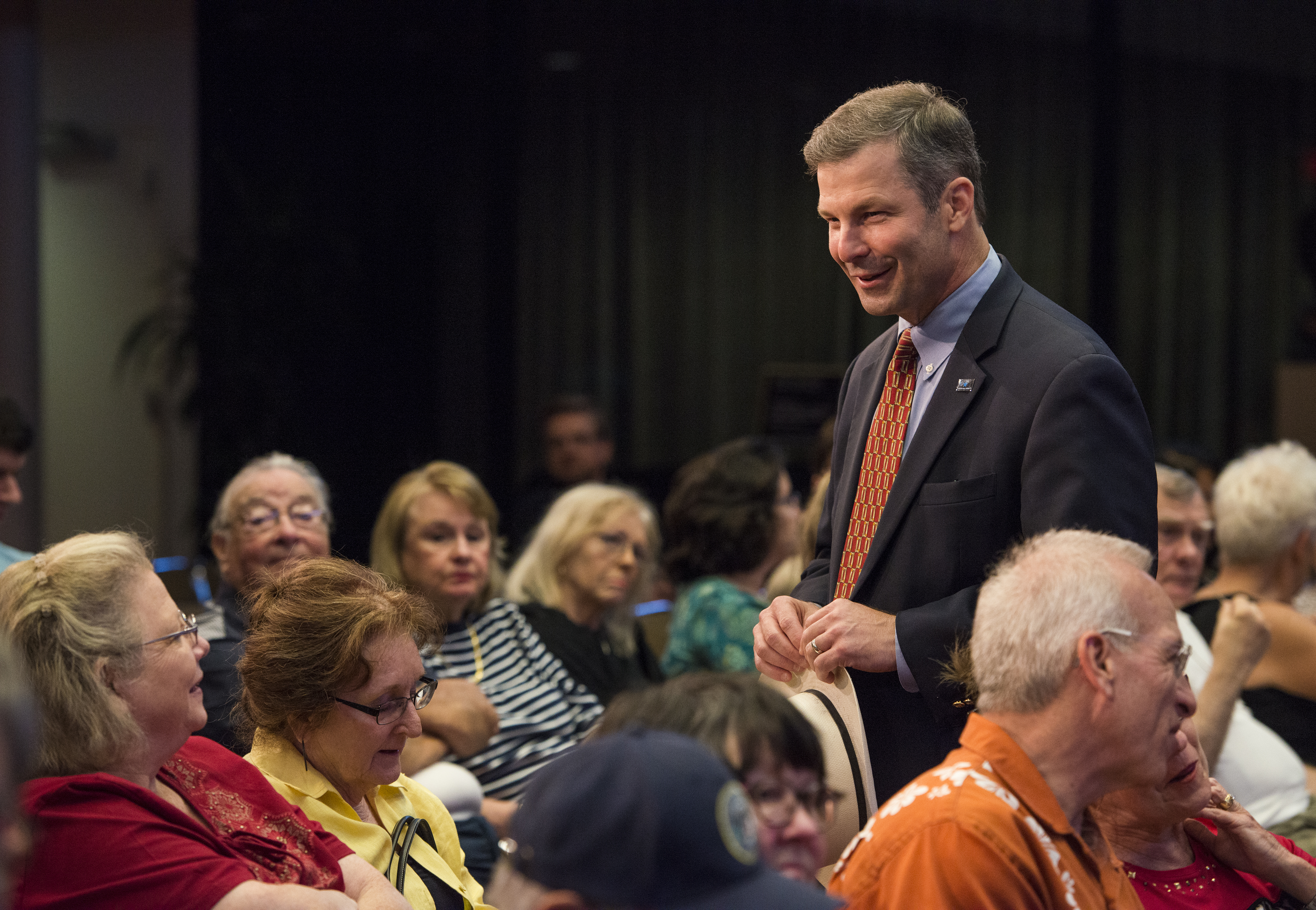
- Simpson in 2015

Member of the Texas House of Representatives from the 7th district
- In office January 11, 2011 – January 10, 2017
- Preceded by: Tommy Merritt
- Succeeded by: Jay Dean

Personal details
- Born: June 27, 1961 (age 65) Lubbock, Texas, US
- Party: Republican
- Spouse: Susan Simpson
- Children: 7
- Education: Vanderbilt University (BA); Trinity Ministerial Academy
- Profession: Businessman
- Website: www.davidsimpson.com

David Philip Simpson (born June 27, 1961) is a former Republican member of the Texas House of Representatives for District 7, based in Gregg and Upshur counties. In 2010, he unseated the incumbent, Tommy Merritt of Longview, in the Republican primary with 52.88 percent of the vote and then prevailed in the general election for the 82nd Texas Legislature on November 2, 2010 with 91.28 percent of the vote, having had no Democratic opponent.

== Life and career ==
Simpson was born in Lubbock in West Texas. He was the mayor of Avinger in Cass County from 1993 to 1998 before he relocated in 2000 to Longview, the seat of government of Gregg County. He and his wife, Susan, have seven children. Simpson is a Christian and has published a statement of faith. He has been described as someone who "did exactly what he said he would do in his campaign and stood for limited government".

Simpson's website states that he "will steadfastly fight for limited government and freedom under the rule of law."

Simpson again defeated Merritt in the 2012 Republican primary to secure his second term and was then unopposed in the November 6 general election in which Barack H. Obama defeated Mitt Romney.

In December 2012, Simpson announced his candidacy for Texas House Speaker in a conservative bid to oust the moderate Republican Joe Straus of San Antonio from the top position in the leadership of the chamber. As Simpson entered the contest for speaker, his East Texas colleague, Bryan Hughes of Mineola, exited the race, having tried for six months previously to line up commitments from colleagues to oust Straus. Hughes immediately endorsed Simpson "wholeheartedly" over Straus, and called him an "eminently fair, highly principled, and hardworking legislator". However, Simpson withdrew before the balloting for Speaker began, and Straus was reelected without opposition on January 8, 2013.

== Political positions ==
=== Security screening ===
Simpson filed legislation in the 2011 Texas legislative session to be able to prosecute, what he deemed, "offensive and intrusive groping" searches of private parts without probable cause by the Transportation Security Administration and other security personnel. The bill, HB 1937, passed unanimously out of committee and then again out of the Texas House. The bill had 94 co-authors from both parties. However, it failed to pass in the Texas Senate after the U.S. Department of Justice threatened to cancel all flights out of Texas if the legislation were to be enacted.

=== Immigration ===
During the children's immigration crisis, Simpson visited the border to see first hand what was happening. Upon his return, he called for more immigration judges, and advocated for greater compassion for immigrants.

=== Marijuana ===
Simpson is in favor of the decriminalization of marijuana, writing: "I don't believe that when God made marijuana he made a mistake that government needs to fix." In May 2015 he presented a bill to legalize marijuana. It was approved by the House Criminal Jurisprudence Committee, but failed to advance further.

=== Marriage ===
Simpson called the Supreme Court's decision in Obergefell v. Hodges "lawless and unconstitutional". In its aftermath, Simpson advocated for marriage privatization to "divorce marriage from government" and called upon Governor Greg Abbott to convene a special session for the Legislature to consider changing state law to remove state and local officials from involvement in issuing marriage licenses.

== 2016 election defeat ==
Simpson did not seek re-election to the House in 2016. Instead he ran, against Conservative Bryan Hughes, a Mineola lawyer, for the District 1 seat in the Texas State Senate seat held since 2004 by Moderate Republican Kevin Eltife, a former mayor of Tyler, who did not seek reelection. Eliminated in the March 1 primary was the two-star United States Army General James K. "Red" Brown of Lindale, and businessman and lawyer Mike Lee. However, both Hughes and Simpson moved on to a runoff that was held on May 24, 2016. In the contest against Simpson, Hughes carried the backing of Lieutenant Governor Dan Patrick, the presiding officer of the state Senate. Hughes won the runoff in a landslide.

Simpson was succeeded in the House by Jay Dean, a former mayor of Longview who won the Republican nomination against David Watts and ran without opposition in the November 8 general election.

Texas House of Representatives
Preceded by Tommy Merritt	Member of the Texas House of Representatives from the 7th district 2011–2017	Succeeded by Jay Dean
