= Pike Powers =

American attorney (1941–2021)

John Pike Powers IV (May 1, 1941 – October 31, 2021) was a Texas attorney, state legislator and civic leader.

== Early life and career ==
Powers was born in Houston, Texas, attended Lamar University and graduated from the University of Texas at Austin School of Law in 1965. He was elected to the Texas House of Representatives in 1972 and represented Jefferson County in the state Legislature until 1979. In 1978, he opened the Austin office of the Houston-based law firm Fulbright & Jaworski (now Norton Rose Fulbright) where he served as managing partner. He retired in 2006.

== Government investment and economic development ==
Powers served as executive assistant to Texas Governor Mark White from 1983 until 1985, working with business and political leaders across the state, to win two national competitions for technology consortia. The first, the Microelectronics Computer Consortium (MCC), chose the small college town of Austin, Texas, over San Diego, Raleigh-Durham and Atlanta. In 1987, Powers is widely credited with crafting the incentives that won (and later attempted to retain) the Semiconductor Manufacturing Technology (SEMATECH), a public-private partnership jointly funded by the U.S. Deptartment of Defense and the semiconductor industry to recapture U.S. leadership in chip manufacturing. Central to both selections was the support of the University of Texas, which over time benefited from an infusion of faculty and facilities that transformed its Cockrell School of Engineering into a world-class research institution.

Powers led Austin's successful 1996 effort to recruit Samsung Group's initial U.S. manufacturing, or fabrication (fab) site known as Samsung Austin Semiconductor, a $4 billion investment in the Central Texas economy. At the state level, he worked with Texas Governor Rick Perry to draft legislation that continues to help Texas cities compete for projects with significant potential for job creation and capital investment. Powers also served as an expert witness on the impact of government-sponsored innovation on national and regional competitiveness, in 2006 testifying before the U.S. House of Representatives' Committee on Science.

== Collaboration and achievements ==
Powers' contributions to Austin's innovation ecosystem continued until the end of his life. The Pecan Street research project, which measures the impact of alternative energy sources on residential communities, is based at the Pike Powers Commercialization Lab. Other collaborations included MassChallenge, the Army Futures Command, and the University of Texas at Austin's Dell Medical School. Achievements include:

- Member, Texas House of Representatives, 1972-1979
- Executive Assistant, Governor Mark White, 1983-1984
- Austin Chamber of Commerce, chair (1989) and vice chair (1990)
- Texas Super Lawyer (2003)
- 100 Most Influential Lawyers in the United States (1988,1991, 1994)
- Member, State Bar of Texas Board of Directors
- Member, Maritime Law Assoc. of the United States
- Member, Federation of Insurance and Corporate Counsel
- Member, National Assoc. of Railroad Trial Counsel
- Governor's Science and Biotechnology Council (2002-3)
- Austinite of the Year (2005)
- Texan of the Year (2017)
- George Kozmetsky Lifetime Achievement Award (2019)
- Member, Austin Technology Hall of Fame (2025)
