= Nico LaHood =

American attorney (born 1972)

Nicholas "Nico" LaHood

Personal details
- Born: September 16, 1972 (age 53) San Antonio, Texas, U.S.
- Party: Independent
- Other political affiliations: Democratic (until 2018)
- Education: St. Mary's University
- Occupation: Former Bexar County Criminal District Attorney, Attorney, Former Magistrate Judge

Nicholas "Nico" Anthony LaHood (born September 16, 1972) is a former criminal district attorney of Bexar County, Texas.

== Early life and education ==
LaHood was born on September 16, 1972, to Judge Michael Thomas LaHood Sr. and Norma Olivia (née Mendiola) in San Antonio, Texas.

While in his third year at San Antonio College in 1994, LaHood was arrested for attempting to sell ecstasy pills worth $3,600, with a firearm to an undercover police officer at a strip club. He entered into a plea bargain in August 1994 and was given deferred adjudication and probation.

LaHood graduated from St. Mary's University in 1999 and then law school in 2002.

== Career ==
LaHood ran for district attorney in 2010, but narrowly lost to Susan Reed. Controversies that contributed to his loss included his age, past drug arrest, and firearm charges. After the election, LaHood had already decided to run again in 2014. In the 2014 Democratic primaries for the District Attorney race, LaHood faced off against Therese Huntzinger. LaHood narrowly beat his opponent: LaHood received 20,413 votes, just 47 more than Huntzinger's 20,366. In the 2014 election for District Attorney, LaHood defeated Susan Reed, the incumbent. LaHood was sworn in as the new DA on January 1, 2015.

Soon after taking office, LaHood was informed that Genene Jones, a San Antonio nurse convicted of murdering a baby girl in 1981, but suspected (and confessed) in many other murders, would be benefited by a 1977 Texas state law which gave her triple credit in her 1984 sentencing and that she would be freed in March 2018. LaHood ordered a task force to keep Jones in prison by bringing new charges against her, eventually indicting Jones with five counts of murder. In January 2020, Jones accepted a plea deal and pleaded guilty to one of those counts and was sentenced to life in prison. LaHood, who attended the hearing, called Jones "pure evil", and his job was praised by a Houston Victim Advocate organization.

In 2017, state district judge Lori Valenzuela testified that LaHood had threatened the careers of two defense attorneys if they brought up an affair between a prosecutor in his office and a key witness for the prosecution in a murder case. Judge Valenzuela, who presided over the case, testified under oath that she had witnessed the threats made in her chambers. LaHood also testified, denying that he had made a threat.

LaHood has promoted the unfounded conspiracy theory that vaccines are linked to autism. In a statement videotaped in his office for the anti-vaccine film Vaxxed, Lahood asserted that vaccines "can and do cause autism," LaHood repeated these claims in testimony to a Texas House committee. LaHood also stated that Islam is a "horrifically violent" religion.

On March 6, 2018, LaHood lost the Democratic primary for district attorney to Joe Gonzales by more than 18 percentage points.

In September 2018, LaHood announced he was leaving the Democratic party, saying "leftists have taken over".

== Personal life ==
LaHood married Davida Gil on July 8, 2006. They have four children together. On August 15, 1996, LaHood's brother Michael LaHood Jr. was murdered in the driveway of his parents' house after a failed robbery. The triggerman Mauriceo Mashawn Brown, along with three other men, was later caught and tried. Under the Texas law of parties, not only Mauriceo Mashawn Brown, but also the driver of the car that carried Brown, Kenneth Foster Jr., was tried for capital murder, and in May 1997 both were sentenced to death. In July 2006, Mauriceo Brown was executed for the crime by lethal injection. On August 31, 2007, Foster's death sentence was commuted by Governor Rick Perry.
