= Joe Gonzales (attorney) =

American attorney and politician

Criminal District Attorney of Bexar County, Texas
- Incumbent
- Assumed office January 2019
- Preceded by: Nico LaHood

Personal details
- Born: San Antonio, Texas, U.S.
- Party: Democratic
- Education: St. Mary's University (BA, JD)
- Occupation: Attorney, politician

Joe Gonzales is an American attorney and politician who is the Bexar County criminal district attorney, defeating Tylden Shaeffer in the general election. Gonzales became the Democratic candidate after defeating incumbent district attorney Nico LaHood in the March 6 Democratic primary. Before his election, Gonzales was an attorney practicing at Joe Gonzales & Associates, P.C. Gonzales was re-elected to a second term in 2022.
