= Bill White (Texas politician) =

American politician (born 1954)

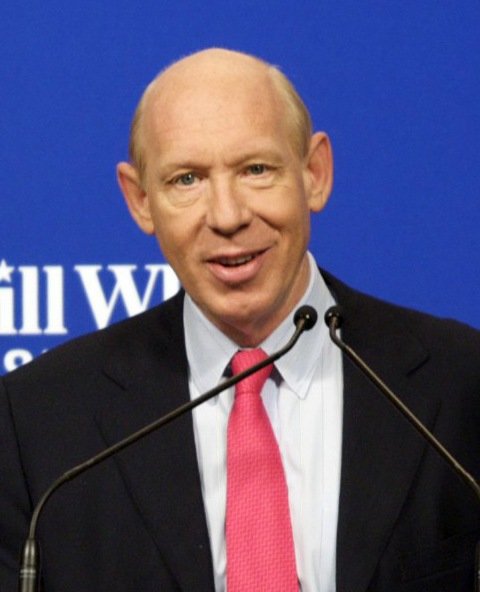
- White in 2009

60th Mayor of Houston
- In office January 2, 2004 – January 2, 2010
- Preceded by: Lee P. Brown
- Succeeded by: Annise Parker

United States Deputy Secretary of Energy
- In office June 26, 1993 – January 20, 1995
- President: Bill Clinton
- Preceded by: Linda Stuntz
- Succeeded by: Charles B. Curtis

Personal details
- Born: William Howard White; June 16, 1954 (age 72) San Antonio, Texas, U.S.
- Party: Democratic
- Spouse: Andrea Ferguson
- Children: 3
- Education: Harvard University (BA); University of Texas at Austin (JD)

William Howard White (born June 16, 1954) is an American attorney, businessman and politician who was the 60th mayor of Houston from 2004 to 2010. A member of the Democratic Party, he was the Democratic nominee for Governor of Texas in the 2010 election, in which he lost to Republican Rick Perry. Before serving as Mayor, White was an attorney and businessman and served as U.S. Deputy Secretary of Energy under President Bill Clinton from 1993 to 1995. White is on the membership roster of the Council on Foreign Relations.

== Family and personal life ==
White was born and grew up in San Antonio. He is the son of Bill and Gloria Avalon White, both public schoolteachers. He and his wife have helped lead various charitable and civic organizations. White is an avid cyclist and every year he leads Houston's annual "Bike to Work Day." He also created the annual biking event "Tour de Houston" through historic Houston neighborhoods.

Bill White's wife Andrea is the daughter of Arthur John Ferguson (1917–2008), a Louisiana State University graduate in mechanical engineering originally from New Orleans, and the former Patsi Wells, a native of Baton Rouge. Andrea White has written several novels, one of which received the Golden Spur Award as well as being named to the Texas Bluebonnet List.

White and his wife Andrea are the parents of three children, Will, Elena and Stephen.

The Whites are members of St. Luke's United Methodist Church in Houston.

== Education and career ==
White graduated from Churchill High School before attending Harvard University on American Legion scholarships and graduating magna cum laude with a degree in economics. At Harvard his roommate was Mir Murtaza Bhutto— son of former Pakistan's Prime minister Zulfikar Ali Bhutto. He then attended The University of Texas School of Law, where he was elected editor-in-chief of its law review and graduated with highest honors.

White also served as an administrator on the Board of Directors for the Baylor College of Medicine.

White began his career as a lawyer at Susman Godfrey, LLP, a leading law firm in Houston, from 1979 to 1993, where he practiced business litigation and anti-trust law, and eventually became partner.

He served as U.S. Deputy Secretary of Energy under President Bill Clinton from 1993 to 1995. He organized Frontera Resources, a developer of oil and gas in the Caspian Sea region, and was also the chairman of the Texas Democratic Party, from 1995 to 1998. He was the president and CEO of WEDGE Group, an energy, construction and real estate company, from 1997 to 2004.

== Community and business activities ==
White has served on the board of directors for the North American Electric Reliability Council. He was chairman for both the World Trade Division and the Environmental Advisory Committee, and served on the executive committee, for the Greater Houston Partnership. He has also served on the board of directors for the Houston Quality of Life Coalition.

He is an official sponsor and supporter of the Amazing Faiths Project of Houston.

== Mayor of Houston ==
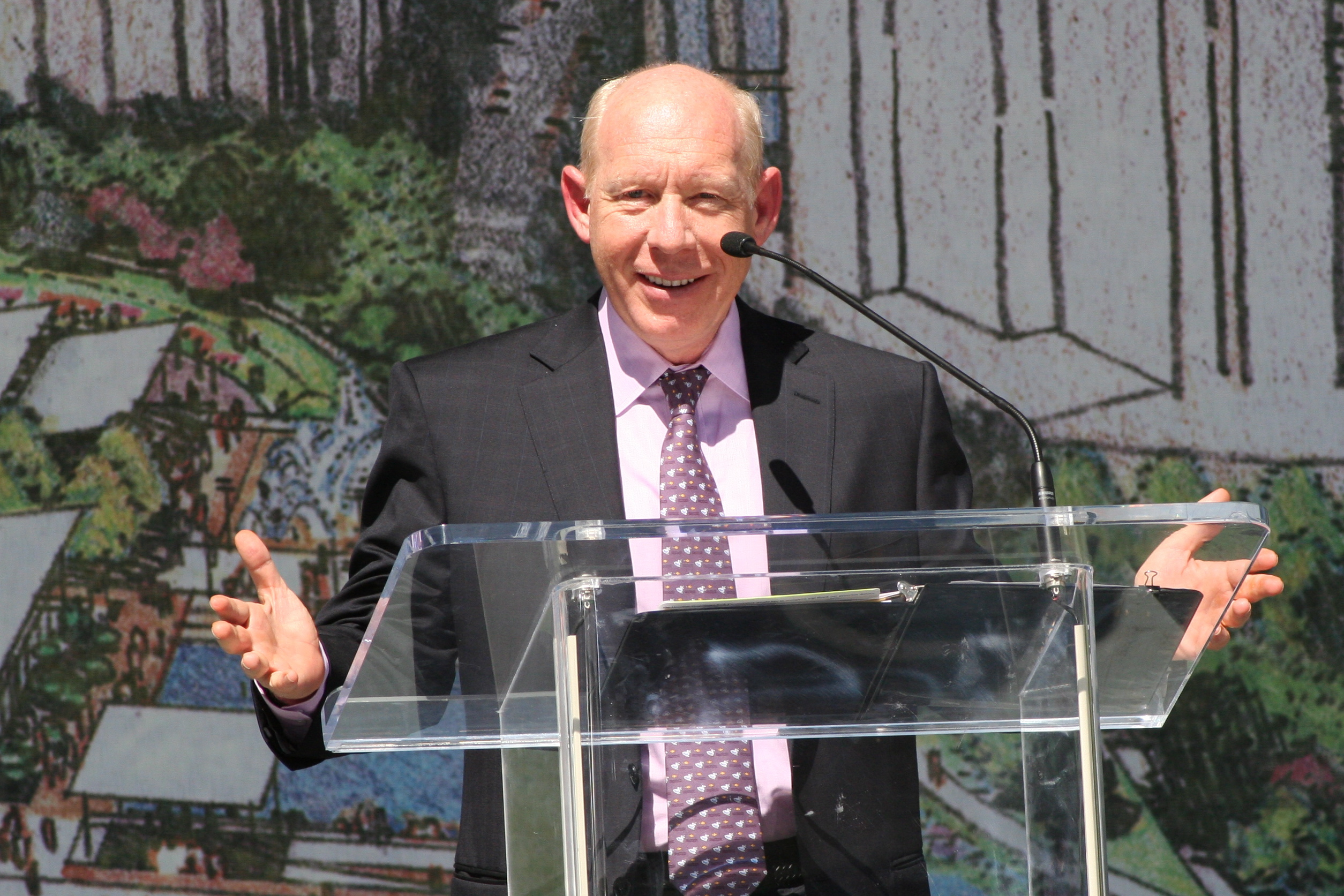
White at the Discovery Green park naming ceremony on October 17, 2006

In 2003, White, a Democrat, ran in Houston's officially nonpartisan mayoral election to succeed term-limited Mayor Lee Brown, who was the first African-American mayor of the city. Running as a moderate with business experience, he appealed to Democrats and Republicans despite having little name recognition.

One of White's opponents in the race was Republican Orlando Sanchez, a Cuban-American and a former Houston City Councilman, who had unsuccessfully challenged Brown in a heated 2001 bid to become Houston's first Hispanic mayor. Also running was Democratic Texas State Representative Sylvester Turner, who had run for mayor in 1991 (against then-incumbent Kathy Whitmire and real estate developer Bob Lanier). In that race, Turner was embroiled in an insurance scandal exposed in an investigation by Houston's ABC affiliate, KTRK-TV that eventually led to a 1996 lawsuit; Lanier went on to defeat Whitmire.

In the November election, White, along with Sanchez, defeated Turner. In the runoff, White defeated Sanchez with 63 percent of the vote.

White was a member of the Mayors Against Illegal Guns Coalition, a bi-partisan group with a stated goal of "making the public safer by getting illegal guns off the streets." The Coalition is co-chaired by Boston Mayor Thomas Menino and New York City Mayor Michael Bloomberg. White resigned from the group in July 2009. White's staff said that the group's focus had grown from its original effort to prevent the sale of stolen guns. Regarding a recent proposal to allow those with concealed gun permits to carry them into other states, White's staff added that he resigned the day that the group took out a newspaper advertisement denouncing that proposal.

=== First term ===
White's first term as mayor of Houston began on January 2, 2004. He gained popularity during this term, which led to significant support for his reelection.

During this term, Houston hosted Super Bowl XXXVIII, the 2004 MLB All-Star Game, the 2006 NBA All-Star Game and the 2005 World Series. These events have been great boosts to Houston's economy. He also led the building of Houston's Metro light rail system.

In 2004, White, his wife Andrea, and then Houston ISD Superintendent Kaye Stripling assembled an education summit with about 400 local community and civic leaders to discuss Houston's then high drop-out rate. That year, White and his wife established Expectation Graduation, a program designed to reduce high school drop-out rates.

In the aftermath of Hurricane Katrina, thousands of residents of New Orleans were displaced. White offered refuge for the victims in the Astrodome, the George R. Brown Convention Center, and a large building formerly housing an Auchan location. He also helped set up programs to help them find long-term housing, job placement, and education within Houston. He was later awarded the John F. Kennedy Profile in Courage Award for his service in the light of this catastrophe.

Just weeks after Hurricane Katrina, it looked as though Houston would become the target of Hurricane Rita. White mobilized the citizens of Houston to evacuate. During a series of press conferences, White and Harris County County Judge Robert Eckels instructed Houstonians on when to evacuate. Officials employed a strategy that called for the evacuation of flood prone areas first. This evacuation, however, led to many problems as it caused multi-hour backups on all freeways in Houston. This prompted White to later lead an evacuation plan reform for Houston.

In 2005 White initiated the SafeClear Program, designed to quickly clear roads and freeways of stalled vehicles. The program requires stalled vehicles to be towed off freeways in Houston as soon as possible. It was created to keep traffic down, as Houston has severe backups during the morning and evening rush hours. It was also meant to make the freeways safer by keeping them cleared of stalled vehicles. This program led to controversy when it was first started, however, for several reasons. It originally required motorists to pay for the towing of their stalled vehicle, but at reduced prices set by the city. Tow truck drivers claimed that the program hurt their business and nine wrecker companies filed lawsuits against the city. White testified in court in the case. In addition the SafeClear Program has been blamed for causing the deaths of people, who seemed to be trying to get their cars off the freeway without having to pay fees to the tow truck drivers. The cause of death of these people, however, is uncertain. State Senator John Whitmire recruited 30 out of 31 Texas State Senators' votes to make the SafeClear program illegal. White responded to the controversy and criticism by changing the rules of the program and the towing laws, including free towing for limited distances funded by the city. The program was adapted to include strict licensing of SafeClear wreckers including criminal background checks, allowing the towed motorist to be towed for one mile for free, preventing the City leasing stretches of state-owned highway to private wrecker companies, and requiring revenue generated from the program to enter a mobility fund. White also worked with John Whitmire to address the objections of the senators, keeping the program alive but in a different format. He also rode with a wrecker and conducted several studies of the program. Despite the controversy, independent studies have found that the program has helped. Studies show that the program has been successful in decreasing accidents. A study, conducted by Rice University and Texas A&M University found that the number of freeway crashes decreased by 10.4%, or nearly 2,000 crashes. According to these results, drivers in Houston saved approximately $35 million by the implementation of the program. However Suzanne Poole, president of the Houston Professional Towing Association, says those numbers are misleading and actual crashes are actually higher. In reference to the program's objective to decrease traffic congestion, a study by KHOU-TV found that average drive times increased at 86% of freeways into Houston six months after the program was implemented compared to before the program. However, some claim that more cars were on the roads during these six months and that construction on the freeways, particularly on US 59, caused drive times to increase. Nonetheless, SafeClear remained one of the most controversial, and one of few controversies, during his time as mayor.

White also lowered Houstonians' property tax in 2006 and again during the next four years gaining him support from some local Republicans. White also helped lead to neighborhood water sewage improvements, a reform of the city's pension fund, a crackdown on Houston's high crime rate and began a local recycling campaign known as "Stop Trashing Houston" to discourage littering.

=== Second term ===
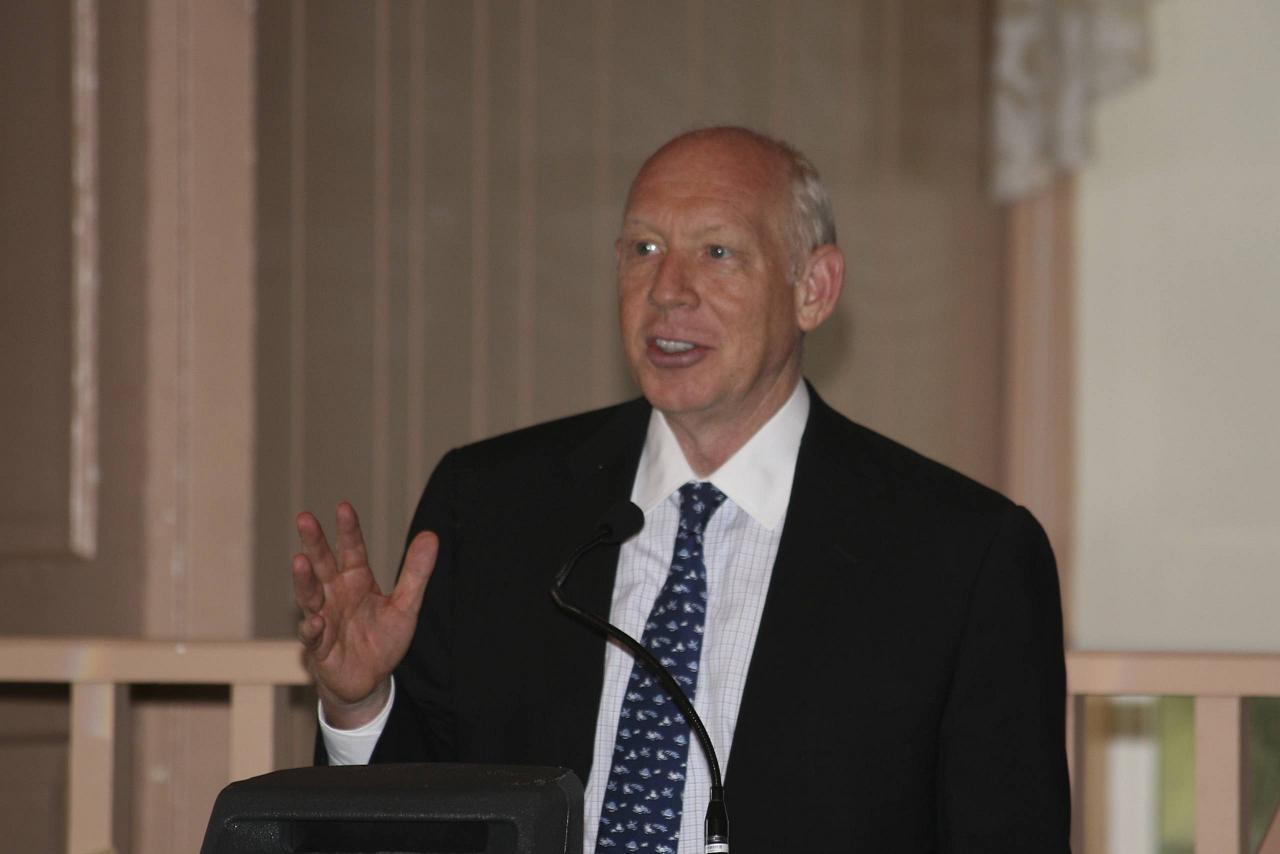
Bill White speaking at an International Association of Business Communicators event

In 2005, White was challenged for re-election by minor and perennial candidates and won re-election with 91 percent of the vote–the highest percentage received by a mayoral candidate in Houston in 60 years.

During his second term, White focused his work on improving graduation rates in the city's high schools, enforcing air pollution standards, reducing the possibility of flooding in newer areas, adopted a more flexible system of working hours, and to create public-private initiatives with private business and community organizations to stimulate growth in the city's most neglected subdivisions. His moderate leanings were shown by his defense of businesses, such as Shawn Welling's Planet Funk, which faced closure in mid 2005.

In 2005, White formed the Mayor’s Wellness Council and launched the Get Moving Houston fitness campaign. Houston had previously been rated “Fattest City in America" by Men’s Fitness magazine.

In 2006, White proposed a series of eight city propositions aimed at improving infrastructure without a tax increase. All eight city propositions passed in a November 2006 election.

White worked to create the Discovery Green park in Houston, which held its groundbreaking in October 2006. Mayor White's 2008 inauguration was held at the park. The park officially opened to the public in April 2008 with a ribbon cutting led by White.

In 2007, the FBI released a report showing an increase in Houston's murder rate. While some speculated about the impact of Hurricane Katrina victims who settled on the Southwest side of town, Mayor White released a statement concerning the FBI's findings:

"With the regard to the 2006 figures now being reported, the FBI calculated a murder rate per 100,000 people for Houston based on census estimates of a 2,073,729 population as of July 1, 2005. That was before Houston’s population swelled by well over 100,000 people. On the basis of U.S. Post Office change of address information we estimated the 2006 population at 2,198,755. While it is normally fair to make year-to-year comparisons based on population estimates that lag crimes by a year or more, the unusual increase in Houston’s population for 2006 makes our City’s figures for the murder rate per 100,000 not quite comparable to the rate in other communities in 2005."

Energy conservation topped the Mayor's list of concerns in 2007. Via the City's Power to People Web site, Mayor White encourages energy conservation through tips and tools, education about tax incentives, and raffles.

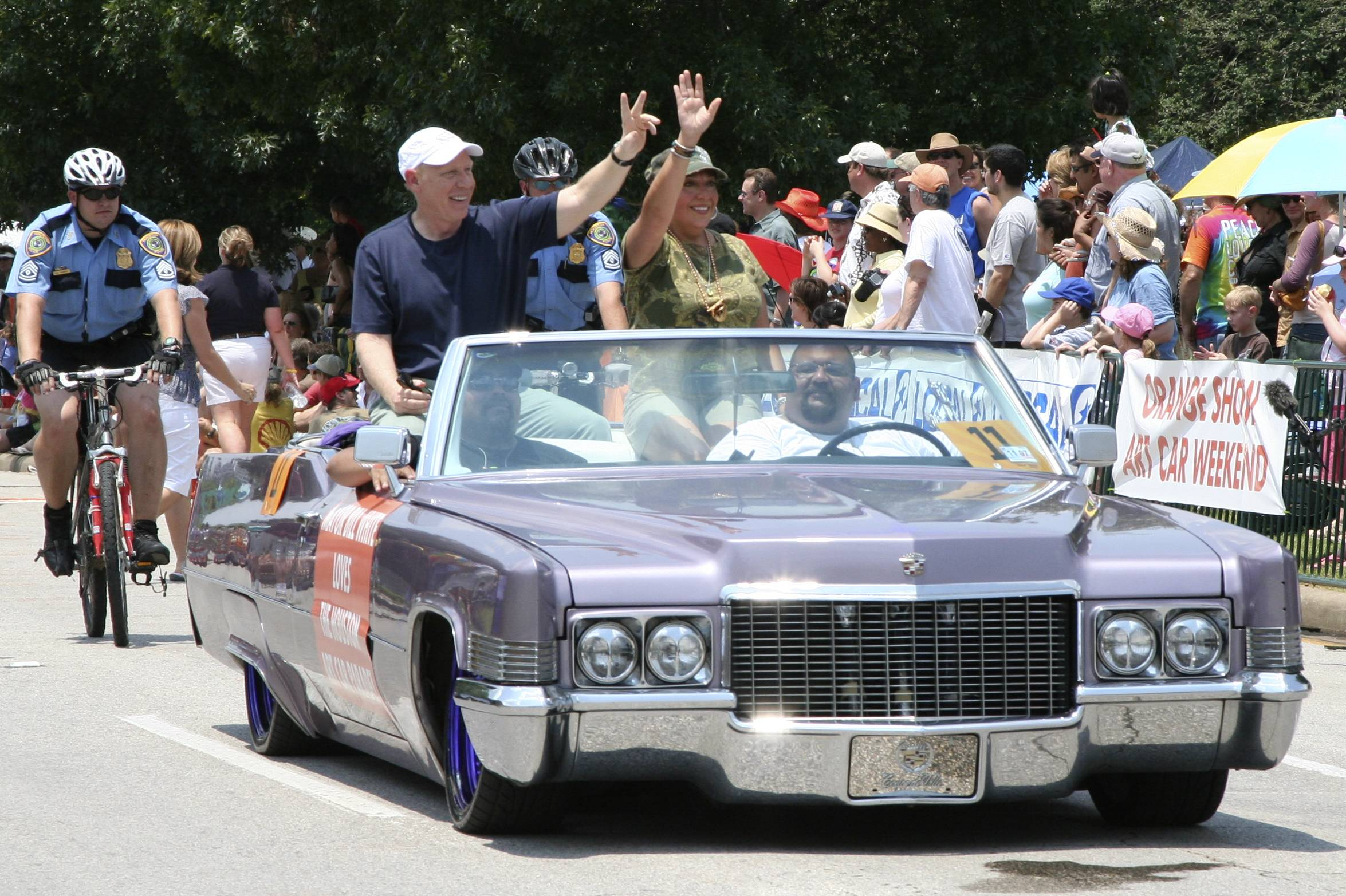
Bill White in a lowrider at the 2007 Houston Art Car Parade

In 2007, White was honored the John F. Kennedy Profile in Courage Award for his service during Hurricane Katrina. He was also awarded the FBI's Director's Community Leadership Award for lowering Houston's crime rate stating that "Mayor White made public safety one of his highest priorities, as evidenced by Houston's decreasing crime rate."

White proposed closing The Center Serving Persons with Mental Retardation. Mayor White's position was that the Center's lease of one dollar per annum to the city of Houston was not legal. Seven previous Mayors had honored the lease. White felt the city's revenue stream could be enhanced by evicting the Center and its intellectually disabled clientele and using the land for commercial purposes. The Center will have to borrow 6 million dollars and relocate in the settlement reached with the city.

During White's second term he focused on reducing the number of car accidents in Houston. To do this, he started a campaign to stop drunk driving. He led a summit, hosted by Mothers Against Drunk Driving. He also presented a plan to increase enforcement, education, and public awareness. This included installing signs around the Houston area warning of drunk driving and urging people to dial *DWI if they suspect someone of drunk driving. In 2007, he also launched the "Mobility Response Team", a task force staffed by traffic officers that patrol within the loop fixing traffic problems. They also report traffic light outages, issue parking citations, help clear and direct traffic around minor accidents.

Also, at the recommendation of Houston Police Chief Harold Hurtt, White had 50 red-light cameras installed around Houston. Originally four intersections were used to test the traffic cameras in September 2006. The trial cameras met the requirements and were approved for using throughout the city. The red-light cameras caused controversy, though, even leading to some lawsuits. Many people argued that this was just a way for the city to make money at the expense of public safety. However, White has stood behind his decision to keep the red light cameras. Studies have revealed mixed results of the effectiveness of red-light cameras. A study in Houston in 2008 revealed an increase in accidents at intersections with red light cameras, although it also revealed a decrease in citations. A city-financed study of red-light cameras at Houston intersections shows traffic accidents doubled at those intersections in their first year. The study also found that citations decreased. However, other studies have found that red-light cameras reduce accidents and citations. A study by Texas A&M University found that accidents were reduced in Texas by 30%. Several studies funded by insurance trade groups which study traffic safety, have found the cameras had a dramatic effect and reduced accidents by as much as 30 percent. A study released in 2008 from the Texas Transportation Institute found a 30 percent reduction across the state. A study in Lubbock, Texas of red light cameras showed a 52% increase in accidents, so the City Council voted against installing them. A news investigation found that the Houston intersections with cameras often had yellow lights that were too short, and violated Texas Department of Public Safety recommendations. Houston suburb Sugar Land found that the combination of lengthening yellow lights and installing cameras reduced violations by 96 percent. This finding is consistent with a March 2005 Texas Transportation Institute study of 181 Texas intersections during a three-year period which found that increasing the length of yellow-light time by one second reduced violations by 53 percent and crashes by 40 percent.

He was rated Governing Magazine's Public Official of the Year in 2007.

=== Third term ===
White's third term began in January 2008 with his inauguration at the Discovery Green Park.

White made fighting pollution in and around the Houston area a top concern during his third term. He put pressure on local factories to limit pollution. He particularly emphasized reducing carcinogenic benzene emissions. He launched the Benzene Action Plan in 2007 which monitors benzene emissions and aims to reduce concentrations in the air. He forced Houston's largest refinery Lyondell Chemical Company, located along the Houston Ship Channel, to publicly defend its carcinogenic emissions. This received criticism from some businesses claiming White overstepped his powers as mayor, while he received praise from some citizens. In thanks to his fighting of pollution in Houston, White was awarded the HERO Award (Houston-Galveston Environmental Research & Outreach Award) on September 15, 2008. In August 2008, White traveled to Stavanger, Norway, one of Houston's sister cities, for an energy conference. On June 9, 2008, White revealed plans to increase solar energy capacity for the city of Houston. Solar panels were installed on the Code Enforcement building and the roof of the City Hall Annex building. Houston was chosen as one of the U.S. cities in the Solar America Cities program designed increase the use of solar technology. The U.S. Department of Energy is providing assistance to the city in expanding its solar energy capacity.

In 2008, White also hosted the inaugural class of a new program called City Hall Fellows. The program brought on ten promising recent college graduates to assist with special projects with department directors, through a one-year paid fellowship. Founded by Bethany Rubin Henderson, who was named an Echoing Green Fellow in 2009 and is currently serving as a White House Fellow, the City Hall Fellows program also included the Civic Leadership Development Program, giving members of the cohort exposure to civic, business, and community leaders dealing with some of the most pressing challenges and most promising opportunities facing the region. Citing the budget crises that accompanied the Recession, Mayor Annise Parker cancelled the program after just two years.

Texas Governor Rick Perry and state officials had originally convinced the Environmental Protection Agency to give Houston until 2019 to meet ozone standards, but Houston met the standards in 2009. The air went from a peak of 120 ozone molecules per billion molecules of air down to 84 molecules per billion.

Following several issues with Houston's Bureau of Animal Regulation and Care (BARC), including the so-called “Corridor of Cruelty”, abuse and neglect, staff problems, funding, White addressed several issues with the bureau and moved it out of Houston's health department to be run as a separate agency.

On October 16, 2009, the city of Bridge City, Texas honored Bill White with a ceremony and commemorative plaque for his leadership during and after Hurricane Ike and his work to repair the damage caused by the storm.

White's third term ended on January 2, 2010. Due to term limits, he was unable to run again for mayor of Houston.

== 2010 Texas gubernatorial election ==
There had been speculation that White might run for higher office. On December 12, 2008, it was announced that White had decided to run for the United States Senate seat currently held by Republican Kay Bailey Hutchison, should she resign to challenge incumbent Governor Rick Perry, as was expected at the time.

On November 23, 2009, Democrat Tom Schieffer dropped out of the 2010 Texas governor's race, endorsing Bill White for the race despite White being a candidate for the U.S. Senate. Later that same day, Mayor White announced that he would "consider" running for governor. On December 4, White officially announced that he would run for governor.

White won the Democratic primary for governor on March 2, 2010 and faced off against Perry, the Republican nominee. Polls showed Perry with a comfortable lead. However White did show strong support among Independent voters, young voters under 35, and minorities.

In an interview with The Texas Observer on June 11, 2010, White discussed how he would combine his experiences in both business and politics to provide Texas with better leadership.

White was defeated by incumbent Republican Governor Rick Perry in the general election on November 2, 2010. Shortly after this loss, White declined to run for the United States Senate seat vacated by Republican Kay Bailey Hutchison in the 2012 U.S. Senate election.

== Later career ==
In 2014, Bill White published (with the Manhattan publishing house PublicAffairs) America’s Fiscal Constitution: Its Triumph and Collapse, on the subject of the growing national-debt crisis.

The volume received generally positive and respectful national attention. In The Wall Street Journal, reviewer Edward Chancellor noted that "Mr. White suggests a return to the austere principles that governed the issuance of public debt from the birth of the Republic until recently... To this end, America's Fiscal Constitution serves a noble purpose." Bethany McLean wrote, in a review for the Sunday New York Times: "This book will be music to the ears of budget hawks everywhere... In his measured way, [White] is critical of both George W. Bush and Barack Obama... This is an important book, but not an easy one."

Shortly after the book's release, White (then working as a senior adviser at the global financial advisory and asset management firm Lazard) told Maggie Galehouse of the Houston Chronicle, “I have no itch to run for public office... I like my life exactly as it is.”

== Electoral history ==
=== 2003 ===
Houston Mayoral Election – Nov. 4, 2003
Candidate	Votes	%	±
Bill White	111,646	38.0%	
Orlando Sanchez	98,107	33.4%	
Sylvester Turner	82,254	28.0%	
Anthony Dutrow	401	0.1%	
Veronique Michelle Gregory	379	0.1%	
John Worldpeace	364	0.1%	
Jack Josey Terence	320	0.1%	
Luis Ralph Ullrich Jr.	311	0.1%	
Douglas Robb	192	0.1%	

Houston Mayoral Election Runoff – Dec. 6, 2003
Candidate	Votes	%	±
Bill White	136,617	62.5%	
Orlando Sanchez	81,824	37.5%	

=== 2005 ===
Houston Mayoral Election – Nov. 8, 2005
Candidate	Votes	%	±
Bill White (Incumbent)	168,331	91.0%	
Gladys Marie House	7,941	4.3%	
Jack Terence	4,319	2.3%	
Luis Ralph Ullrich Jr.	2,579	1.4%	
Anthony Dutrow	1,797	1.0%	

=== 2007 ===
Houston Mayoral Election – Nov. 6, 2007
Candidate	Votes	%	±
Bill White (Incumbent)	101,277	86.5%	
Amanda Ulman	8,798	7.5%	
Josey Wales	7,023	6.0%	

=== 2010 ===
Texas Governor Democratic Primary – Mar. 2, 2010
Party	Candidate	Votes	%
Democratic	Bill White	516,621	76.0
Democratic	Farouk Shami	87,268	12.8
Democratic	Felix Alvarado	33,708	5.0
Democratic	Alma Aguado	19,556	2.9
Democratic	Clement E. Glenn	9,852	1.4
Democratic	Bill Dear	6,574	1.0
Democratic	Star Locke	6,298	0.9
Total votes		679,877	100

Texas Governor General Election – Nov. 2, 2010
Party	Candidate	Votes	%	±%
Republican	Rick Perry (Incumbent)	2,733,784	54.97	+15.95
Democratic	Bill White	2,102,606	42.28	+12.50
Libertarian	Kathie Glass	109,057	2.19	
Green	Deb Shafto	19,475	0.39	
Independent	Andy Barron (Write-In)	7,973	0.16	

== See also ==
- Politics of Houston
- List of mayors of Houston

Political offices
Preceded by Linda Stuntz	United States Deputy Secretary of Energy; 1993–1995	Succeeded by Charles Curtis
Preceded by Lee Brown	Mayor of Houston; 2004–2010	Succeeded by Annise Parker
Party political offices
Preceded by Chris Bell	Democratic nominee for Governor of Texas; 2010	Succeeded by Wendy Davis
