= Senator Chambers =

Senator Chambers may refer to:

== Members of the United States Senate ==
- Ezekiel F. Chambers (1788–1867), U.S. Senator from Maryland from 1826 to 1834
- Henry H. Chambers (1790–1826), U.S. Senator from Alabama from 1825 to 1826

== United States state senate members ==
- David Chambers (congressman) (1780–1864), Ohio State Senate
- Ernie Chambers (born 1937), Nebraska State Senate
- George Chambers (New York politician) (1815–1880), New York State Senate
- John Green Chambers (1798–1884), Texas State Senate
