= Window Boy =

2008 novel by Andrea White

- Author: Andrea White
- Language: English
- Genre: Fiction
- Published: 2008
- Publication place: United States

Window Boy is a 2008 novel written by Andrea White, author of Golden Spur Award winning, and Texas Bluebonnet Award nominated novel, Surviving Antarctica. The book is about a boy with cerebral palsy who has an imaginary friend, Winston Churchill.

This book has been released and has received excellent reviews from several reviewers, including The Houston Chronicle, Publishers Weekly, Booklist, and the Florida Library Youth Program Newsletter.
