= Jon Lindsay (politician) =

American politician (1935–2026)

Member of the Texas Senate from the 7th district
- In office January 14, 1997 – January 9, 2007
- Preceded by: Don Henderson
- Succeeded by: Dan Patrick

Harris County Judge
- In office January 1975 – January 1995
- Preceded by: Bill Elliott
- Succeeded by: Robert Eckels

Personal details
- Born: December 4, 1935 Denver, Colorado, U.S.
- Died: January 7, 2026 (aged 90)
- Party: Republican
- Spouse: Tony Davis (m. 1958; died 2024)
- Children: 3

Jon Stephen Lindsay (December 4, 1935 – January 7, 2026) was an American politician who was a Republican member of the Texas Senate, having represented the 7th District from 1997 to 2007.

== Life and career ==
Jon Stephen Lindsay was born on December 4, 1935.

He was succeeded in 2007 by fellow Republican Dan Patrick, who would later be elected as Lieutenant Governor of Texas.

Considered a moderate Republican, Lindsay was from 1975 to 1995 the county judge of Harris County. He defeated incumbent judge, Bill Elliott in 1974. He did not seek reelection in 1994 and was succeeded as county judge by fellow Republican Robert Eckels.

Lindsay died on January 7, 2026, at the age of 90.

== Election history ==
=== 2002 ===
Texas general election, 2002: Senate District 7
Party	Candidate	Votes	%	±%
Republican	Jon Lindsay	139,827	91.31	−8.69
Libertarian	Edgar L. Buchanan	13,305	8.69	+8.69
Majority		126,522	82.62	−17.38
Turnout		153,132		−30.34
Republican hold				

=== 2000 ===
Texas general election, 2000: Senate District 7
Party	Candidate	Votes	%	±%
Republican	Jon Lindsay	219,835	100.00	0.00
Majority		219,835	100.00	0.00
Turnout		219,835		+20.69
Republican hold				

=== 1996 ===
Texas general election, 1996: Senate District 7
Party	Candidate	Votes	%	±%
Republican	Jon Lindsay	182,144	100.00	0.00
Majority		182,144	100.00	0.00
Turnout		182,144		+26.82
Republican hold				

Republican primary, 1996: Senate District 7
Candidate		Votes	%	±
	Jerry Dumas	27,658	48.56	
✓	Jon Lindsay	29,303	51.44	
Turnout		56,961		

Legal offices
Preceded by Bill Elliott	County Judge of Harris County, Texas; 1975–1995	Succeeded by Robert Eckels
Texas Senate
Preceded by Don Henderson	Texas State Senator from District 7 (Houston); 1997–2007	Succeeded by Dan Patrick
