= Gray Reed & McGraw =

Gray Reed & McGraw LLP (Gray Reed)
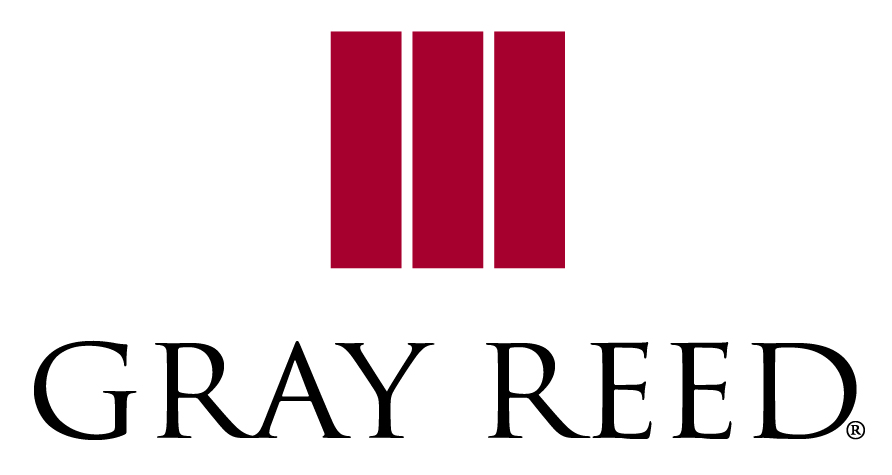
- Headquarters: Houston, Texas
- No. of offices: 3 (Houston, Dallas, Waco)
- No. of attorneys: 156 (2020)
- Major practice areas: Construction, Corporate Restructuring and Bankruptcy, Energy, Family Law, Healthcare, Intellectual Property, Labor & Employment, Litigation, Mergers & Acquisitions, Private Equity, Real Estate, Tax, Transactional, Litigation, Trusts & Estates
- Key people: J. Cary Gray (Chairman), Kyle Sanders (Managing Partner), Matthew Childress (Chief Operating Officer)
- Date founded: 1985
- Company type: Limited Liability Partnership

Gray Reed is a Texas-based, commercial law firm with offices in Dallas, Houston and Waco. In 2013, Houston Business Journal listed Gray Reed among the top 20 largest law firms in Texas with over 150 attorneys state-wide. Based in Houston, Texas, attorneys for the firm serve as legal advisors to mid-market and large businesses, providing legal services to industries including oil and gas, healthcare, construction, real estate, technology, and food and agriculture.

== History ==
Gray Reed & McGraw (formerly Looper Reed & McGraw) was founded in August 1985 by three Houston lawyers—Don Looper, Jim Reed, and Jim McGraw from Reynolds, Allen & Cook. In 1990, the firm opened its Dallas office. By the end of the 1990s, the firm had expanded to more than 50 attorneys and by the end of 2012, the firm had reached 120 attorneys. On January 1, 2014, Looper Reed & McGraw parted ways with Don Looper and changed its name to Gray Reed & McGraw. By 2020, Gray Reed had grown to a 150 lawyer firm.

== Notable shareholders and employees ==
- Tony Box, former FBI special agent, military attorney, and federal prosecutor
- Robert Eckels, former Harris County Judge (1995–2007) and member of the Texas House of Representatives (1983–1995)
- Hon. Jack Morris Rains, 95th Secretary of State of Texas
- Hon. Jeff Leach, Texas State Representative, District 67 (2013–Present)
- Justice Jim Moseley, Court of Appeals for the Fifth District of Texas (1996-2014)
- Michael B. Overstreet, JD, CPA, from Kountze, Texas.
