= 2014 Texas lieutenant gubernatorial election =

- November 4, 2014

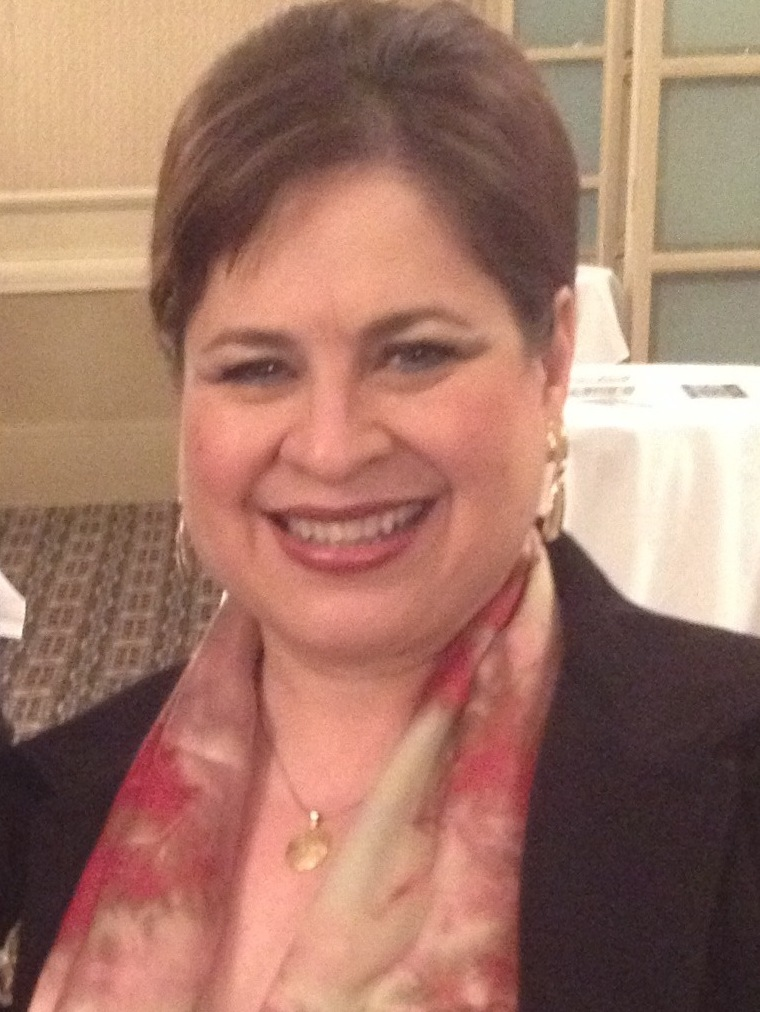
Nominee	Dan Patrick	Leticia Van de Putte
Party	Republican	Democratic
Popular vote	2,718,406	1,810,720
Percentage	58.1%	38.7%
- County results Patrick: 40–50% 50–60% 60–70% 70–80% 80–90% >90% Van de Putte: 40–50% 50–60% 60–70% 70–80% 80–90% >90%
Lieutenant Governor before election
David Dewhurst
Republican
Elected Lieutenant Governor
Dan Patrick
Republican

The 2014 Texas lieutenant gubernatorial election was held on November 4, 2014 to elect the Lieutenant Governor of Texas. Incumbent Lieutenant Governor David Dewhurst ran for an unprecedented fourth term, but was defeated in the Republican primary by his more conservative opponent, state senator Dan Patrick. Patrick would go on to win the general election in a landslide over Leticia Van de Putte. Patrick was sworn in on January 20, 2015.

== Republican primary ==
=== Candidates ===
Nominee

- Dan Patrick, state senator

==== Eliminated in runoff ====
- David Dewhurst, incumbent lieutenant governor

==== Eliminated in primary ====
- Jerry E. Patterson, Commissioner of the General Land Office
- Todd Staples, Commissioner of Agriculture

Declined

- Susan Combs, Comptroller of Public Accounts

=== Polling ===
Poll source	Date(s) administered	Sample size	Margin of error	David Dewhurst	Dan Branch	Susan Combs	Ed Emmett	Dan Patrick	Jerry Patterson	Todd Staples	Other	Undecided
UoT/Texas Tribune	February 7–17, 2014	461	± 4.56%	37%	—	—	—	31%	17%	15%	—	—
Public Policy Polling	November 1–4, 2013	388	± 5%	37%	—	—	—	18%	10%	4%	—	31%
UoT/Texas Tribune	October 18–27, 2013	519	± 5.02%	26%	—	—	—	13%	10%	5%	—	46%
Public Policy Polling	June 28–July 1, 2013	318	± ?	37%	—	—	—	17%	7%	5%	—	34%
UoT/Texas Tribune	May 31–June 9, 2013	492	± 5.27%	19%	—	—	—	10%	6%	5%	—	61%
Public Policy Polling	January 24–27, 2013	400	± ?	37%	—	18%	—	12%	2%	4%	—	26%
University of Texas-Austin	May 7–13, 2012	343	± 5.29%	—	3%	29%	—	23%	9%	10%	22%	4%
DWBS	April 27–30, 2012	400	± 4.5%	—	2%	28%	5%	15%	5%	7%	—	39%
University of Texas-Austin	February 8–15, 2012	361	± 5.16%	—	3%	27%	—	20%	8%	8%	34%	—
University of Texas-Austin	October 19–26, 2011	397	± 4.92%	—	1%	14%	—	9%	5%	2%	5%	64%

Primary results map by county: Patrick: 30–40% 40–50% 50–60% 60–70%; Dewhurst: 30–40% 40–50% 50–60%; Staples: 30–40% 40–50% 50–60% 60–70%; Patterson: 60–70%

=== Results ===
Republican primary results
Party	Candidate	Votes	%
Republican	Dan Patrick	552,692	41.43
Republican	David Dewhurst (incumbent)	377,856	28.32
Republican	Todd Staples	236,949	17.76
Republican	Jerry Patterson	166,399	12.47
Total votes		1,333,896	100.00

Runoff results map by county: Patrick: 50–60% 60–70% 70–80% 80–90% >90%; Dewhurst: 50–60% 60–70% 70–80% 80–90% >90%; Tie: Tie

=== Runoff ===
Polling

Poll source	Date(s) administered	Sample size	Margin of error	David Dewhurst	Dan Patrick	Other	Undecided
Baselice & Associates	March 5–6, 2014	501	± 4.4%	34%	55%	—	11%

Results

Republican primary runoff results
Party	Candidate	Votes	%
Republican	Dan Patrick	487,829	65.05
Republican	David Dewhurst (incumbent)	262,086	34.95
Total votes		749,915	100.00

== Democratic primary ==
=== Candidates ===
Nominee

- Leticia Van de Putte, state senator

Withdrew

- Maria Luisa Alvarado, retired United States Air Force master sergeant and nominee for lieutenant governor in 2006

Democratic primary results
Party	Candidate	Votes	%
Democratic	Leticia Van de Putte	451,211	100.00%
Total votes		451,211	100.00%

== Libertarian nomination ==
=== Candidates ===
Nominee

- Robert Butler

Declared

- Brandon de Hoyos, journalist

Withdrew

- Ed Kless, businessman

== Green nomination ==
=== Candidates ===
Nominee

- Chandra Courtney

== General election ==
=== Polling ===
Poll source	Date(s) administered	Sample size	Margin of error	Dan Patrick (R)	Leticia Van de Putte (D)	Other	Undecided
UoT/Texas Tribune	October 10–19, 2014	866	± 3.6%	52%	35%	13%	—
Survey Research Center	September 22–October 16, 2014	781	± 3.5%	36%	24%	6%	34%
Crosswind Communications	October 9–12, 2014	500	± 4.33%	42.8%	23%	1.2%	33%
Texas Lyceum	September 11–25, 2014	666	± 3.8%	47%	33%	5%	14%
UoT/Texas Tribune	May 30–June 8, 2014	1,200	± 2.83%	41%	26%	9%	23%
Public Policy Polling	April 10–13, 2014	559	± 4.1%	51%	35%	—	14%
UoT/Texas Tribune	February 7–17, 2014	1,200	± 2.83%	41%	32%	—	28%

Hypothetical polling

Poll source	Date(s) administered	Sample size	Margin of error	David Dewhurst (R)	Leticia Van de Putte (D)	Other	Undecided
Public Policy Polling	April 10–13, 2014	559	± 4.1%	50%	32%	—	17%
UoT/Texas Tribune	February 7–17, 2014	1,200	± 2.83%	44%	32%	—	24%
Public Policy Polling	November 1–4, 2013	500	± 4.4%	46%	37%	—	17%

Poll source	Date(s) administered	Sample size	Margin of error	Jerry Patterson (R)	Leticia Van de Putte (D)	Other	Undecided
UoT/Texas Tribune	February 7–17, 2014	1,200	± 2.83%	41%	30%	—	29%

Poll source	Date(s) administered	Sample size	Margin of error	Todd Staples (R)	Leticia Van de Putte (D)	Other	Undecided
UoT/Texas Tribune	February 7–17, 2014	1,200	± 2.83%	41%	29%	—	30%

=== Results ===
2014 Texas lieutenant gubernatorial election
Party	Candidate	Votes	%
Republican	Dan Patrick	2,718,406	58.13
Democratic	Leticia Van de Putte	1,810,720	38.72
Libertarian	Robert Butler	119,581	2.55
Green	Chandra Courtney	27,651	0.59
Majority		907,686	19.41
Total votes		4,676,358	100.00
Turnout			33.34
Republican hold			
