= Texas's 7th Senate district =

American legislative district

Texas's 7th State Senate district
Senator
Paul Bettencourt; R–Houston
- Demographics: 46.2% White; 15.5% Black; 28.5% Hispanic; 10% Asian
- Population: 954,933

District 7 of the Texas Senate is a senatorial district that serves portions of Harris and Montgomery counties in the U.S. state of Texas. The current senator from District 7 is Paul Bettencourt.

== Election history ==
Election history of District 7 from 1992.

=== 2024 ===
Texas general election, 2024: Senate District 7
Party	Candidate	Votes	%
Republican	Paul Bettencourt	251,489	63.41
Democratic	Michelle Gwinn	145,100	36.59
Majority		106,389	26.82
Turnout		396,589	
Republican hold			

=== 2022 ===
Paul Bettencourt (Republican) was unopposed; as such, the election was cancelled and Bettencourt was declared elected without a vote.

=== 2018 ===
Texas general election, 2018: Senate District 7
Party	Candidate	Votes	%	±%
Republican	Paul Bettencourt	177,864	57.75	−14.07
Democratic	David Romero	124,232	40.34	+14.05
Libertarian	Tom Glass	5,878	1.91	+0.02
Majority		53,632	17.41	−28.12
Turnout		307,974		
Republican hold				

=== 2014 ===
Texas general election, 2014: Senate District 7
Party	Candidate	Votes	%	±%
Republican	Paul Bettencourt	123,551	71.82	+3.42
Democratic	Jim Davis	45,230	26.29	−5.31
Libertarian	Whitney Bilyeu	3,244	1.89	+1.89
Majority		78,321	45.53	+8.73
Turnout		172,025		
Republican hold				

=== 2012 ===
Texas general election, 2012: Senate District 7
Party	Candidate	Votes	%	±%
Republican	Dan Patrick	196,526	68.40	−18.01
Democratic	Sam "Tejas" Texas	90,793	31.60	+31.60
Majority		105,733	36.80	−36.02
Turnout		287,319		
Republican hold				

=== 2010 ===
Texas general election, 2010: Senate District 7
Party	Candidate	Votes	%	±%
Republican	Dan Patrick	184,704	86.41	+17.22
Libertarian	Lee Coughran	29,048	13.59	+13.59
Majority		155,656	72.82	+34.45
Turnout		213,752		
Republican hold				

=== 2006 ===
Texas general election, 2006: Senate District 7
Party	Candidate	Votes	%	±%
Republican	Dan Patrick	118,067	69.19	−22.12
Democratic	F. Michael Kubosh	52,586	30.81	+30.81
Majority		65,481	38.37	−44.25
Turnout		170,653		+11.44
Republican hold				

=== 2002 ===
Texas general election, 2002: Senate District 7
Party	Candidate	Votes	%	±%
Republican	Jon Lindsay	139,827	91.31	−8.69
Libertarian	Edgar L. Buchanan	13,305	8.69	+8.69
Majority		126,522	82.62	−17.38
Turnout		153,132		−30.34
Republican hold				

=== 2000 ===
Texas general election, 2000: Senate District 7
Party	Candidate	Votes	%	±%
Republican	Jon Lindsay	219,835	100.00	0.00
Majority		219,835	100.00	0.00
Turnout		219,835		+20.69
Republican hold				

=== 1996 ===
Texas general election, 1996: Senate District 7
Party	Candidate	Votes	%	±%
Republican	Jon Lindsay	182,144	100.00	0.00
Majority		182,144	100.00	0.00
Turnout		182,144		+26.82
Republican hold				

=== 1994 ===
Texas general election, 1994: Senate District 7
Party	Candidate	Votes	%	±%
Republican	Don Henderson	143,628	100.00	+10.91
Majority		143,628	100.00	+21.83
Turnout		143,628		−28.46
Republican hold				

=== 1992 ===
Texas general election, 1992: Senate District 7
Party	Candidate	Votes	%	±%
Republican	Don Henderson	178,850	89.09	
Libertarian	James P. Chudleigh	21,910	10.91	
Majority		156,940	78.17	
Turnout		200,760		
Republican hold				

== District officeholders ==
Legislature	Senator, District 7	Counties in District
1 1846	George Tyler Wood; William C. Abbott	Jefferson, Liberty.
2 1847	William C. Abbott	Jefferson, Liberty, Polk, Tyler.
3 1849	Alfred M. Triutt	Nacogdoches, Shelby.
4 1851	Isaac Parker	Anderson, Cherokee.
5 1853	M. D. K. Taylor	Cass, Titus.
6 1855	M. D. K. Taylor	Cass, Titus.
7 1857	M. D. K. Taylor	Cass, Titus.
8 1859	John Green Chambers	Cass, Titus.
9 1861	John W. Moore	Bowie, Davis, Marion.
10 1863	John W. Moore	Bowie, Davis, Marion.
11 1866	William P. Saufley	Bowie, Davis, Marion.
12 1870	Henry Rawson	Harrison.
13 1873	Henry Rawson	Harrison.
14 1874	David Browning Culberson	Bowie, Cass, Marion.
15 1876	James Postell Douglas	Camp, Gregg, Smith, Upshur.
16 1879	John Martin Duncan	Camp, Gregg, Smith, Upshur.
17 1881	John Martin Duncan	Camp, Gregg, Smith, Upshur.
18 1883	John Young Gooch	Anderson, Cherokee, Henderson, Van Zandt.
19 1885	Constantine Buckley "Buck" Kilgore	Anderson, Cherokee, Henderson, Van Zandt.
20 1887	Alexander White Gregg	Anderson, Cherokee, Henderson, Van Zandt.
21 1889	Robert H. Morris	Anderson, Cherokee, Henderson, Van Zandt.
22 1891	John G. Kearby	Anderson, Cherokee, Henderson, Van Zandt.
23 1893	John G. Kearby	Gregg, Rains, Smith, Upshur, Van Zandt, Wood.
24 1895	Robert N. Stafford	Gregg, Rains, Smith, Upshur, Van Zandt, Wood.
25 1897	Robert N. Stafford	Gregg, Rains, Smith, Upshur, Van Zandt, Wood.
26 1899	Robert N. Stafford	Gregg, Rains, Smith, Upshur, Van Zandt, Wood.
27 1901	Robert N. Stafford	Gregg, Rains, Smith, Upshur, Van Zandt, Wood.
28 1903	Robert N. Stafford	Camp, Smith, Upshur, Van Zandt, Wood.
29 1905	Robert N. Stafford	Camp, Smith, Upshur, Van Zandt, Wood.
30 1907	William J. Greer	Camp, Smith, Upshur, Van Zandt, Wood.
31 1909	William J. Greer	Camp, Smith, Upshur, Van Zandt, Wood.
32 1911	William J. Greer	Camp, Smith, Upshur, Van Zandt, Wood.
33 1913	William J. Greer; Earl M. Greer	Camp, Smith, Upshur, Van Zandt, Wood.
34 1915	William D. Suiter	Camp, Smith, Upshur, Van Zandt, Wood.
35 1917	William D. Suiter	Camp, Smith, Upshur, Van Zandt, Wood.
36 1919	William D. Suiter	Camp, Smith, Upshur, Van Zandt, Wood.
37 1921	William D. Suiter	Camp, Smith, Upshur, Van Zandt, Wood.
38 1923	Tomas G. Pollard	Camp, Smith, Upshur, Van Zandt, Wood.
39 1925	Tomas G. Pollard	Camp, Smith, Upshur, Van Zandt, Wood.
40 1927	Tomas G. Pollard	Camp, Smith, Upshur, Van Zandt, Wood.
41 1929	Tomas G. Pollard	Camp, Smith, Upshur, Van Zandt, Wood.
42 1931	Tomas G. Pollard	Camp, Smith, Upshur, Van Zandt, Wood.
43 1933-	Will D. Pace	Camp, Smith, Upshur, Van Zandt, Wood.
44 1935	Will D. Pace	Camp, Smith, Upshur, Van Zandt, Wood.
45 1937	Will D. Pace	Camp, Smith, Upshur, Van Zandt, Wood.
46 1939	Will D. Pace	Camp, Smith, Upshur, Van Zandt, Wood.
47 1941	T. C. Chadick	Camp, Smith, Upshur, Van Zandt, Wood.
48 1943	T. C. Chadick	Camp, Smith, Upshur, Van Zandt, Wood.
49 1945	T. C. Chadick	Camp, Smith, Upshur, Van Zandt, Wood.
50 1947	T. C. Chadick	Camp, Smith, Upshur, Van Zandt, Wood.
51 1949	Warren McDonald	Camp, Smith, Upshur, Van Zandt, Wood.
52 1951	Warren McDonald	Camp, Smith, Upshur, Van Zandt, Wood.
53 1953	Warren McDonald	Camp, Henderson, Kaufman, Smith, Upshur, Van Zandt, Wood.
54 1955	Warren McDonald	Camp, Henderson, Kaufman, Smith, Upshur, Van Zandt, Wood.
55 1957	Bill D. Wood	Camp, Henderson, Kaufman, Smith, Upshur, Van Zandt, Wood.
56 1959	Bill D. Wood	Camp, Henderson, Kaufman, Smith, Upshur, Van Zandt, Wood.
57 1961	Galloway Calhoun	Camp, Henderson, Kaufman, Smith, Upshur, Van Zandt, Wood.
58 1963	Galloway Calhoun	Camp, Henderson, Kaufman, Smith, Upshur, Van Zandt, Wood.
59 1965	Galloway Calhoun	Camp, Henderson, Kaufman, Smith, Upshur, Van Zandt, Wood.
60 1967	Chet Brooks	Portion of Harris.
61 1969	Chet Brooks	Portion of Harris.
62 1971	Chet Brooks	Portion of Harris.
63 1973	R. A. "Bob" Gammage	All of Fort Bend. Portion of Harris.
64 1975	R. A. "Bob" Gammage; Gene Jones	All of Fort Bend. Portion of Harris.
65 1977	Gene Jones	All of Fort Bend. Portion of Harris.
66 1979	Gene Jones	All of Fort Bend. Portion of Harris.
67 1981	W. Michael "Mike" Richards	All of Fort Bend. Portion of Harris.
68 1983	Don Henderson	Portion of Harris.
69 1985	Don Henderson	Portion of Harris.
70 1987	Don Henderson	Portion of Harris.
71 1989	Don Henderson	Portion of Harris.
72 1991	Don Henderson	Portion of Harris.
73 1993	Don Henderson	Portion of Harris.
74 1995	Don Henderson	Portion of Harris.
75 1997	Jon Lindsay	Portion of Harris.
76 1999	Jon Lindsay	Portion of Harris.
77 2001	Jon Lindsay	Portion of Harris.
78 2003	Jon Lindsay	Portion of Harris.
79 2005	Jon Lindsay	Portion of Harris.
80 2007	Dan Patrick	Portion of Harris.
81 2009	Dan Patrick	Portion of Harris.
82 2011	Dan Patrick	Portion of Harris.
83 2013	Dan Patrick	Portion of Harris.
84 2015	Paul Bettencourt	Portion of Harris.
85 2017	Paul Bettencourt	Portion of Harris.
86 2019	Paul Bettencourt	Portion of Harris.
87 2021	Paul Bettencourt	Portion of Harris.
88 2023	Paul Bettencourt	Portion of Harris. Portion of Montgomery.
89 2025	Paul Bettencourt	Portion of Harris. Portion of Montgomery.
