= Andrea White =

American novelist and civic leader (born 1953)

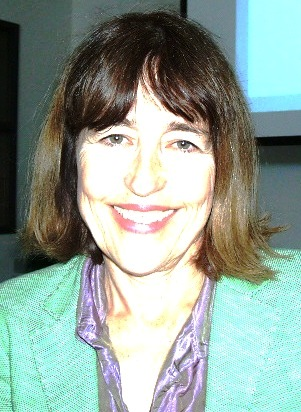
- Born: Andrea Ferguson; November 1953 (age 72); Baton Rouge, Louisiana, U.S.
- Education: University of Texas at Austin (BA, JD)
- Occupations: Author; civic leader; journalist
- Spouse: Bill White
- Children: 3
- Writing career
- Genre: Fiction
- Notable works: Surviving Antarctica, Window Boy
- Notable awards: Golden Spur Award (Surviving Antarctica), Nominated for Texas Bluebonnet (Surviving Antarctica)

Andrea White is an American novelist and civic leader. She is married to the former Houston mayor Bill White.

== Biography ==
Andrea Ferguson was born in Baton Rouge, Louisiana, to Arthur John Ferguson (1917–2008), and Patsi (née Wells) Ferguson. The family moved in the 1950s from Louisiana to Houston, where she attended Memorial High School. She earned her undergraduate and law degrees from the University of Texas and became a partner in the law firm Locke Liddell where she remained until the birth of her second child, after which she was able to turn her writing hobby into a profession.

White's first book, Surviving Antarctica, a novel for teenage readers, was published in 2005. It was listed on the reading lists of several states, including the Texas Bluebonnet Award list. In 2006, she won the Golden Spur Children's Literature award given by the Texas State Reading Association. Her next book, Window Boy, was about a boy in a wheelchair who is a "basketball genius".

White and her husband have three children: Will, Elena, and Stephen.

In addition to writing, White serves as an active community volunteer. In partnership with the Houston Independent School District Board, White, and her husband started Expectation Graduation, a door-to-door initiative to reach out to Houston area youth who had not returned to school. She has also visited many schools such as St. Helen Catholic School in Pearland, Texas to answer questions about her books.

== Gallery ==
Pictures of Andrea White's visit to Krimmel Intermediate.

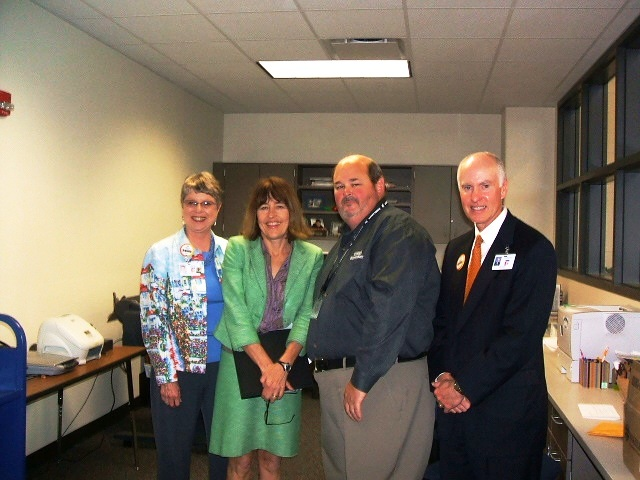
Mrs. White standing with the superintendent of Klein ISD, the Principal of Krimmel Intermediate, and a person from the Klein ISD central Office

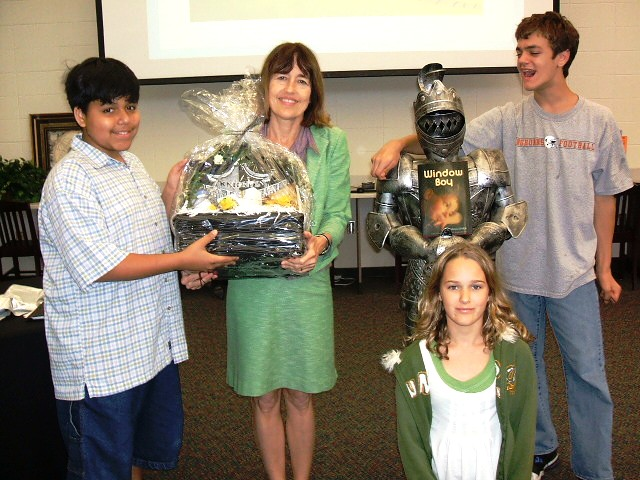
Mrs. White being presented with a gift from Krimmel Intermediate by students and the School's Mascot, Sir Technowlot

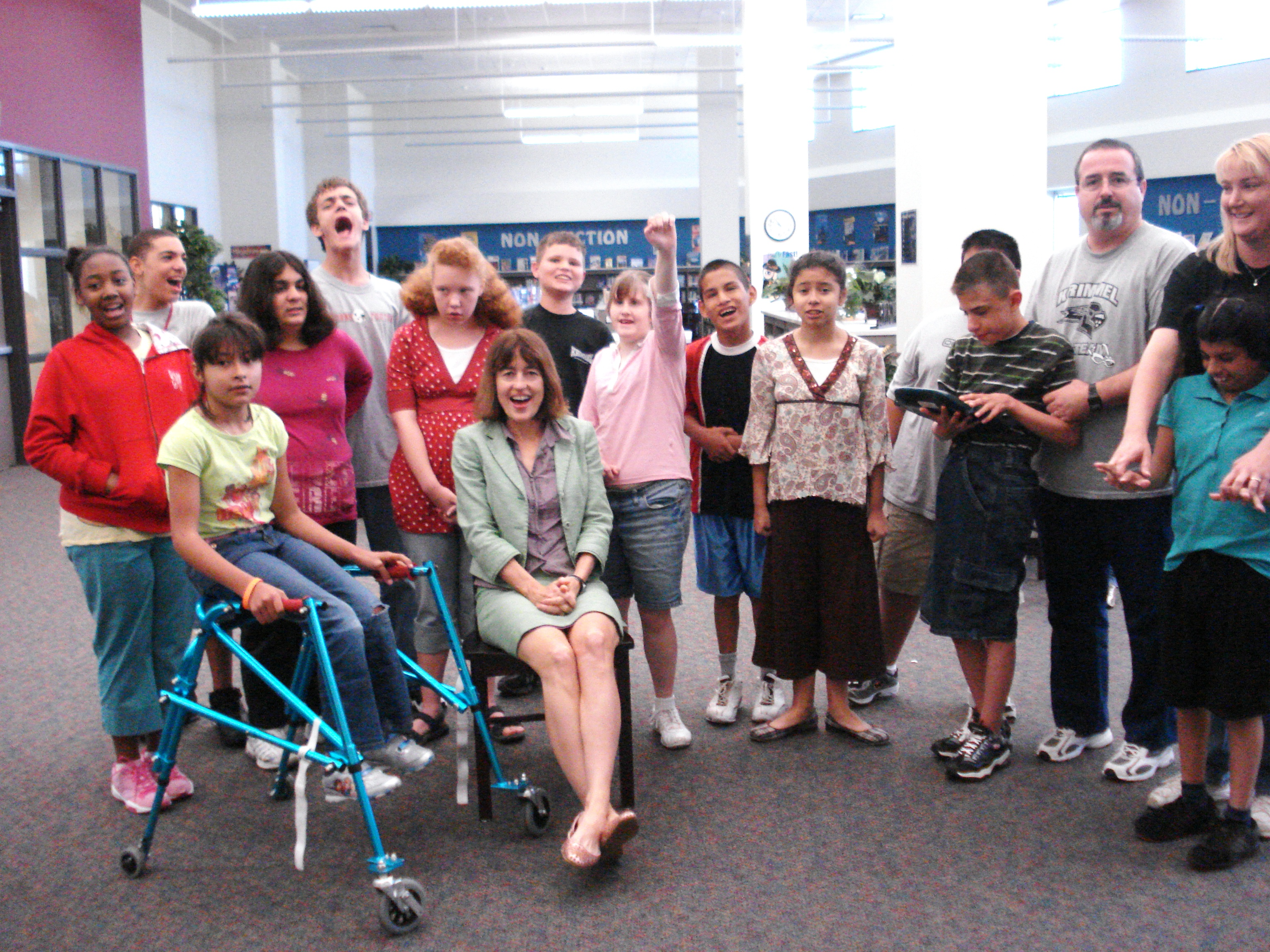
Andrea White posing with the Krimmel Intermediate Developmental Class
