= Dan Patrick (politician) =

Lieutenant Governor of Texas since 2015

- Patrick in 2025

42nd Lieutenant Governor of Texas
- Incumbent
- Assumed office January 20, 2015
- Governor: Greg Abbott
- Preceded by: David Dewhurst

Chair of the Religious Liberty Commission
- Incumbent
- Assumed office May 1, 2025
- President: Donald Trump
- Vice Chair: Ben Carson
- Preceded by: Position established

Member of the Texas Senate from the 7th district
- In office January 9, 2007 – January 13, 2015
- Preceded by: Jon Lindsay
- Succeeded by: Paul Bettencourt

Personal details
- Born: Dannie Scott Goeb; April 4, 1950 (age 76) Baltimore, Maryland, U.S.
- Party: Republican
- Spouse: Jan Rankin (m. 1975)
- Children: 2, including Ryan
- Education: University of Maryland, Baltimore County (BA)
- Occupation: Politician; radio host; television broadcaster
- Website: Office website Campaign website

Dan Goeb Patrick (born Dannie Scott Goeb; April 4, 1950) is an American radio talk show host, television broadcaster, and politician serving the 42nd lieutenant governor of Texas since 2015. A member of the Republican Party, he served as a member of the Texas Senate from 2007 to 2015, and has also served as chair of the Religious Liberty Commission since 2025.

Born in Baltimore, Patrick graduated from the University of Maryland, Baltimore County with a Bachelor of Arts. He began his career as a radio and television broadcaster. After forming a chain of sports bars and subsequently going bankrupt, he became a radio host again, this time becoming a conservative commentator. From 2007 to 2015, Patrick was a member of the Texas Senate for the 7th District, which included a small portion of the city of Houston and several Houston-area suburbs located mostly in northwest Harris County.

Patrick defeated three-term incumbent David Dewhurst in the primary runoff for lieutenant governor on May 27, 2014. He then won the position in the fall general election. He was re-elected in 2018 and 2022, defeating Democratic nominee Mike Collier both times, and then lost to Democrat Vikki Goodwin in the 2026 election.

== Early life ==
Patrick was born Dannie Scott Goeb in Baltimore on April 4, 1950. He was raised in a blue-collar neighborhood in East Baltimore. He is the only child of the former Vilma Jean Marshall (1926–2016) and Charles Anthony Goeb (1926–2002), who worked at The Baltimore Sun for thirty-one years as a newspaper vendor before retiring in 1984.

Patrick graduated with a Bachelor of Arts in English from the University of Maryland, Baltimore County. He is the first member of his family to graduate from college. After graduating and embarking on a broadcasting career, he changed his name from "Dannie Scott Goeb" to "Dan Goeb Patrick" – informally in 1977 and legally in 2004 – to honor his wife's family and brother-in-law.

== Broadcasting and business career ==
=== Radio and television ===
Patrick started his first radio job in 1968 at the age of 18. After college, in 1977, he became a television broadcaster at WNEP-TV in Scranton, Pennsylvania. Patrick later held a similar position at WTTG in Washington, D.C., before he became the lead sportscaster with KHOU-TV in Houston.

As a broadcaster, Patrick got attention through various stunts, such as painting himself blue in support for the Houston Oilers and wearing a large cowboy hat. He became the second most popular TV personality in Houston by 1983, as well as one of the most well-known, though surveys also found that he was one of the most disliked. Patrick's public speaking skills caused him to be nicknamed "the Silver-tongued Devil." Patrick left his job at KHOU in the mid-1980s after failing to reach an agreement with Belo Corporation (which bought KHOU-TV in 1984) for a long-term contract.

=== Sports bar chain ===
In November 1983, Patrick and several investors opened one of the first sports bars in the U.S., which they named Dan and Nick's Sportsmarket. The bar did well for a time, due to "the strength of Patrick's personality" and an oil boom in Houston at the time, and they eventually took ownership of five sports bars in the city.

When the oil boom of the mid 1980s ended and the 1980s oil glut began, Houston's economy went into decline and fiscally damaged Patrick's sports bar chain. In 1986, after the sports bars failed, Patrick filed for personal bankruptcy and in October 1992, discharged several hundred thousand dollars of debt obligation. Patrick, who stated it took 10 years for him and his family "to regain financial equilibrium," has frequently and openly discussed the ordeal and stated how it shaped him as an individual and conservative.

=== Conservative talk radio host ===
Following bankruptcy, Patrick reinvented himself as a conservative talk radio host in the 1990s. He began by buying a four-hour timeslot at AM 700 KSEV (then called KTBT) in the summer of 1987. He originally was a sports radio host, operating out of his remaining sports bar. However, he was able to take over the radio station in 1988, and he switched to politics shortly afterward. He hosted a conservative radio talk show. The program, Dan Patrick & Friends, was broadcast in the Houston radio market on KSEV and in Dallas on AM 1160 KVCE. Initially he broadcast under the pseudonym Dan Scott as a radio host, later changing to the current name at the request of his employer to avoid confusion of Patrick with another anchor at a competing station with the last name of Scott.

Patrick grew successful and influential through his talk radio career. He earned high name recognition. As a talk radio host, Patrick advocated for fiscal conservatism, evangelical Christian values on social issues, and he became a vocal opponent of illegal immigration. He was also known as a populist. Patrick's talk radio career was instrumental to his political rise, including his election and influence in the State Senate and his eventual election as lieutenant governor. One notable decision Patrick made as the owner of a talk radio station was to sign relative unknown Rush Limbaugh for airing on KSEV in 1989 via radio syndication. Limbaugh's success as a national talk show host helped increase ratings of Patrick's radio station.

In addition to radio, Patrick anchored The Patrick Report, a half-hour news program which aired on Houston television station KTBU during 2001. Patrick was also general manager of KTBU. By February 2006, Patrick already owned one radio station. In 2006, Patrick signed a deal to purchase radio station KMGS AM 1160 in Highland Park, Texas (now KBDT). By 2013, Patrick was the majority owner of two radio stations, in Houston and Dallas radio markets. Patrick continued broadcasting after his election as a State Senator, and he continued to own KSEV after his election as lieutenant governor.

=== Other ===
In November 2008, Patrick began work to produce The Heart of Texas, a movie based on a real-life story of two families in Simonton, a small Houston-area city. The movie was released the next year on DVD.

Patrick proposed a boycott of Bill Maher's television show Politically Incorrect over controversial statements made by the comedian following the 9/11 terrorist attacks. Patrick is also frequently at odds with the Houston Chronicle and announced a boycott of that newspaper in April 2004. He owned a blog called Chronically Biased, which criticized the newspaper.

== Early political career (2007–2015) ==
Patrick first considered running for the United States House of Representatives in 2004.

=== Texas Senate ===
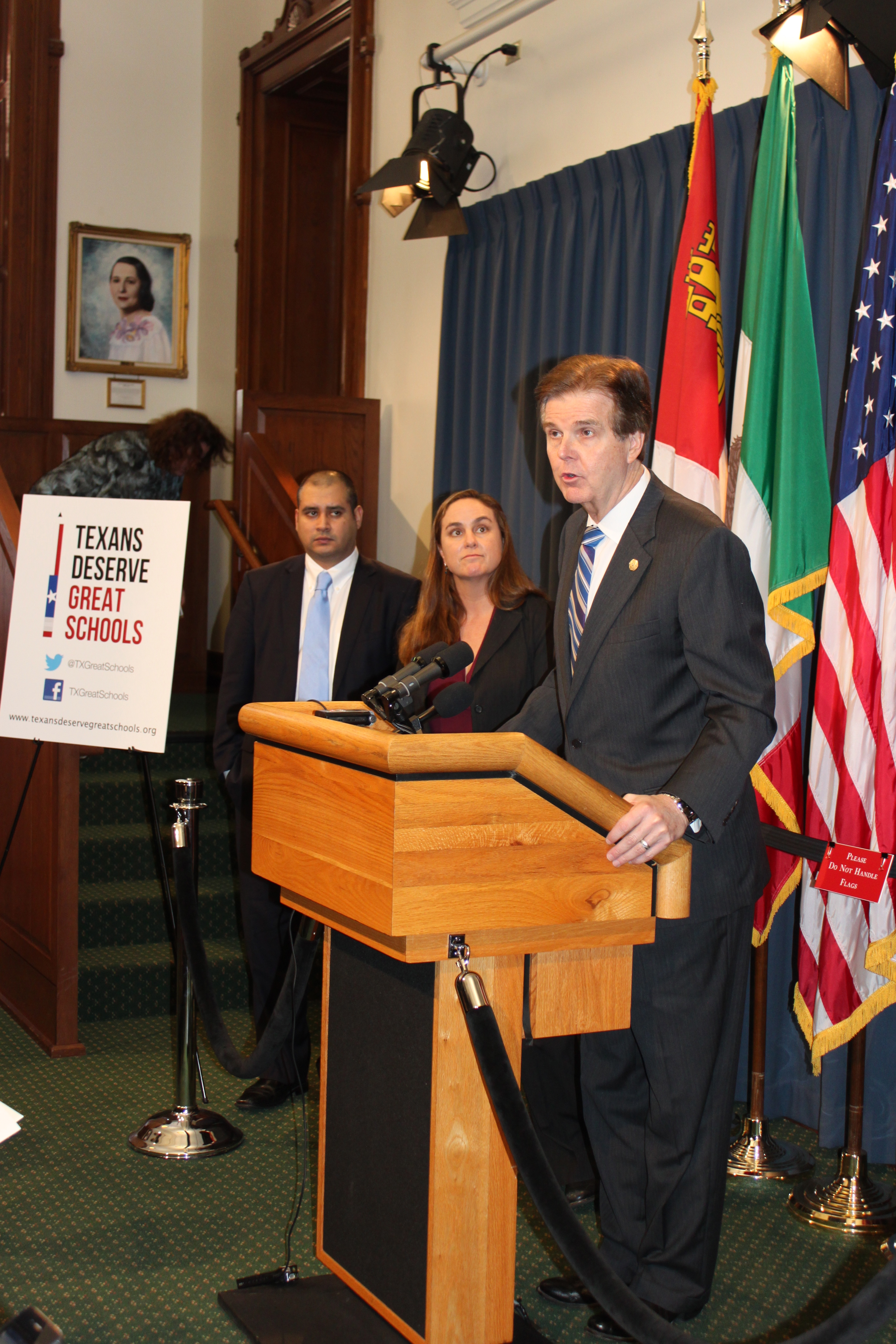
Patrick at a 2013 press conference on education

Patrick was first elected to the Texas State Senate's seventh district in 2006, winning the primary election with 68.8% of the vote and the general election with 69.2% of the vote. His term began on January 9, 2007, with the convening of the Eightieth Texas Legislature.

In the 2010 general election, Patrick was reelected with 86.4% of the vote. He also endorsed Rick Perry for re-election in the 2010 election. Soon after winning re-election, Patrick announced, and subsequently created, a Tea Party Caucus in the Texas state legislature, which at its creation had 48 legislative members.

Patrick obtained passage of three Senate bills during his first session. In the Senate, Patrick actively advocated for a "fiercely conservative agenda." At the time, few of his proposals passed.

W. Gardner Selby, editor of the Austin American-Statesman's "PolitiFact Texas", listed Patrick as third among the top 10 Republican political influencers in Texas. Patrick is also listed in Texas Monthly as one of the state's most powerful players.

During his first month as a legislator, Patrick introduced legislation to make abortion in Texas illegal should the U.S. Supreme Court overturn Roe v. Wade.

In May 2012, acrimony between Patrick and fellow Republican state senator John Carona was widely reported throughout Texas. In an email exchange, Patrick accused Carona of spreading false rumors about Patrick's marriage. Carona denied that, and additionally denied having commented on Patrick's sexuality. Carona further said to Patrick: "I've never been shy about sharing my dislike and distrust of you. Put bluntly, I believe you are a snake oil salesman, a narcissist that would say anything to draw attention to himself." News reports suggested the feud was motivated by positioning to succeed David Dewhurst as lieutenant governor should Dewhurst have won a seat as U.S. senator in 2012.

==== Committee assignments ====
- Committee on Education (Chair)
- Committee on Criminal Justice
- Committee on Finance
- Committee on Health & Human Services
- Committee on Intergovernmental Relations
- Committee on Finance
  - Subcommittee on Fiscal Matters
  - Subcommittee on Public Education Funding
  - Subcommittee on Higher Education Funding

== Lieutenant gubernatorial campaigns ==
=== 2014 campaign ===
On June 26, 2013, Patrick announced he would challenge incumbent David Dewhurst in the Republican primary for lieutenant governor in 2014. This challenge came despite Patrick's enthusiastic endorsement of Dewhurst in his failed 2012 bid for the U.S. Senate. Patrick stated that while he had been planning on retiring from politics after his Senate term ended, he decided to run for lieutenant governor after Dewhurst failed to end fellow State Senator Wendy Davis's filibuster of Texas Senate Bill 5 and after Senator Jane Nelson refused to run herself.

Patrick led the four-candidate field in the primary with 550,769 votes (41.5%). Dewhurst followed with 376,196 (28.3%); Staples, with 235,981 (17.8%), and Patterson, 165,787 (12.5%). Election watchers did not expect Patrick to get first place. In the runoff election on May 27, Patrick won with 487,829 votes (65.1%), defeating Dewhurst, who had 262,086 votes (34.9%). Patrick's victory was one of several notable primary victories by Tea Party movement-aligned Republicans in the election runoff.

According to Ross Ramsey of The Texas Tribune, Patrick did not shift to the political middle as the general election approached, contrary to what political candidates typically do. On November 4, 2014, Patrick won the general election against his state Senate colleague, Democrat Leticia Van de Putte of San Antonio, to become the lieutenant governor-elect of Texas. He was swept into office in a Republican landslide that saw the party retain all statewide elected offices for the fifth consecutive election.

=== 2018 campaign ===
On January 9, 2017, the day before the 85th Texas Legislature began its session, Patrick announced he would run for re-election in 2018. He stated his early announcement was in order to dispel rumors that he would challenge Governor Greg Abbott or U.S. Senator Ted Cruz. Patrick easily won the Republican primary on March 6, 2018, defeating Rockwall City Council Member Scott Milder.

In addition to his own campaign, Patrick was active in endorsing and assisting Republican primary candidates in the Texas Senate, including some challengers to GOP incumbents. Patrick's favored candidates won nearly all the races where Patrick made intraparty endorsements. Later in the year, Patrick donated nearly $175,000 to Texas Senate candidate Pete Flores in a special election; Flores won the election in an upset, increasing Patrick's chances of keeping a three-fifths GOP majority in the Senate after the 2018 elections. Patrick succeeded in maintaining a three-fifths majority in the Senate, though Republican Senator Kel Seliger was considered a possible swing-vote.

In the November 6 general election, Patrick won re-election to a second term, defeating Democratic challenger Mike Collier. He won about 51% of the vote against Collier's 46%.

=== 2022 campaign ===
In the 2022 general election, Patrick again defeated Democratic challenger Mike Collier, winning about 53.8% of the vote to Collier's 43.5%, with an over 826,000 margin.

=== 2026 campaign ===
On January 25, 2023, Patrick told The Texan's reporter McKenzie DiLullo that he would be running for reelection in 2026. Patrick announced his re-election campaign on August 19, 2025, and was then endorsed by President Donald Trump. He won the primary with 84.7% of the vote. In the general election – a wave election in which Republicans lost every statewide office in Texas – he was defeated by his Democratic challenger Vikki Goodwin.

== Lieutenant Governor of Texas (2015–present) ==
=== Tenure ===
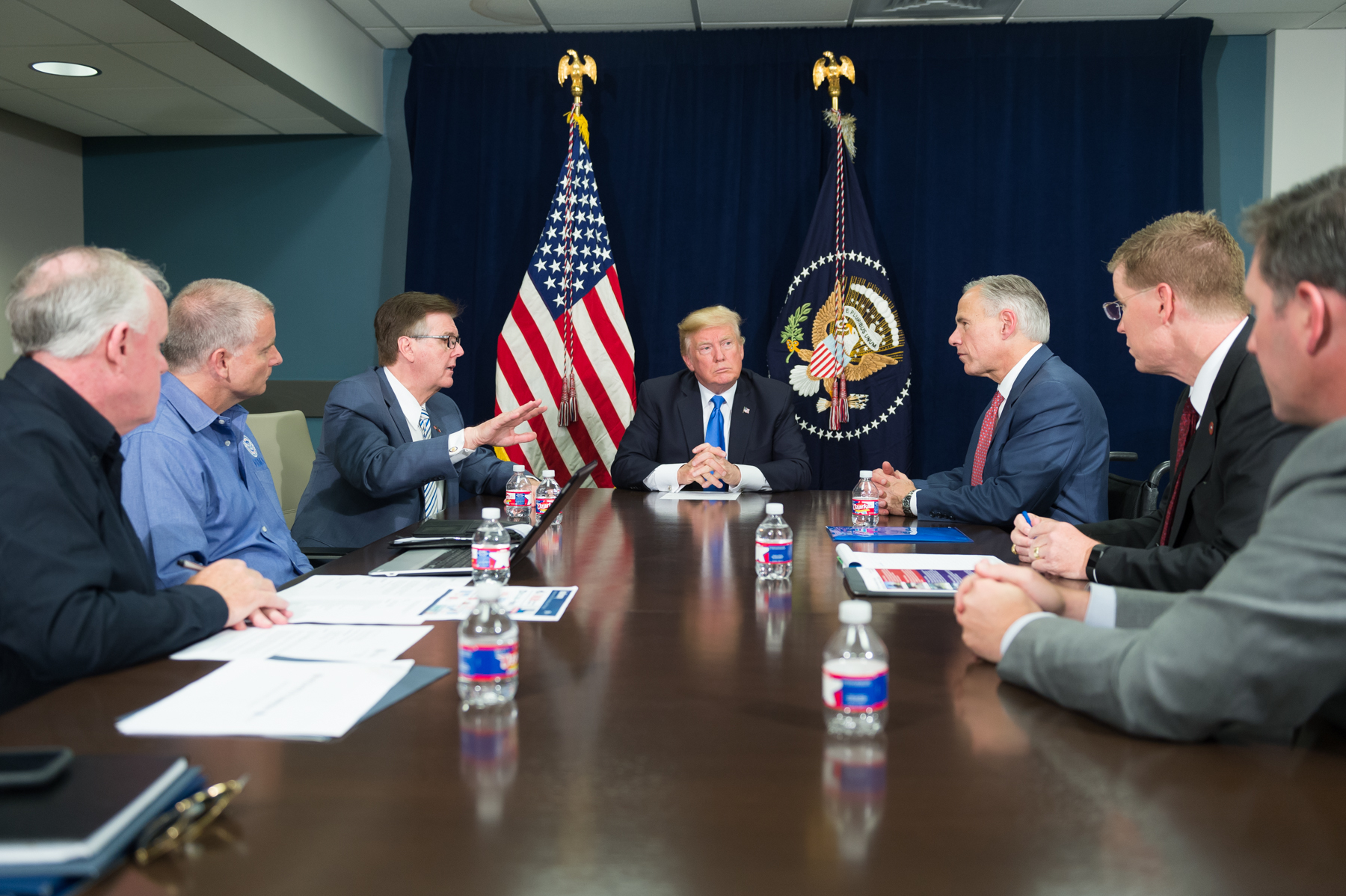
Patrick, third from left, attending a meeting with U.S. President Donald Trump, Texas Governor Greg Abbott, and FEMA officials, on Hurricane Harvey relief and recovery efforts, October 2017.

Patrick was sworn in on January 20, 2015. Soon after assuming office, the Texas Senate voted to drop the threshold needed to consider a bill from two-thirds to three-fifths, something that Patrick had long supported. Under Patrick, the Senate enforced procedural rules that had long been ignored.

Major legislation that Patrick helped pass during his tenure as lieutenant governor include legalization of campus carry and open carry, a bill allowing pastors to refuse marrying couples if it violates their beliefs, and expanded border security and enforcement measures.

Patrick made legislation prohibiting state or local governments from issuing subpoenas on pastors' sermons a priority in the 2017 session. Governor Abbott signed the bill into law on May 21, 2017.

Patrick made legislation requiring the U.S. national anthem at state-funded events a priority for the 2021 session, along with legislation to protect "election integrity" in Texas. Otherwise, Patrick assumed a low-key profile at the beginning of the legislative session. Following the regular 2021 session, The New York Times described Patrick and Governor Abbott as "the driving force behind one of the hardest right turns in recent state history," with Patrick the more conservative of the two. According to the Houston Chronicle, Patrick "uniquely grasped and wielded the power of the growing right-wing movement in Texas," allowing him to become influential in the state.

Patrick with Maryland Lieutenant Governor Aruna Miller at the Maryland State House, January 2025

During his tenure as lieutenant governor, Patrick became influential in Texas Republican politics. He actively endorsed candidates in the 2022 Republican primaries for the Texas Senate, something described as "unusual" for a lieutenant governor. He had an influential role in former president Donald Trump's endorsements in Texas elections.

Following a March 7, 2023, guest lecture by Texas A&M professor Dr. Joy Alonzo at University of Texas Medical Branch (UTMB) that suggested that the Patrick administration's policies on the opioid crisis had led to more opioid deaths, Patrick's office contacted Texas A&M chancellor John Sharp about Alonzo. Alonzo was placed on administrative leave immediately, and was formally censured by UTMB. The investigation by Texas A&M found no evidence of wrongdoing, and Dr. Alonzo's leave was ended two weeks later. Patrick defended his conduct in an August 2, 2023, op-ed in the Houston Chronicle.

On May 1, 2025, Trump appointed Patrick to chair the newly created Religious Liberty Commission.

== Political positions ==
=== Abortion ===
Patrick opposes abortion and authored Texas' "Mandatory Ultrasound Bill", a bill signed into law in May 2011 by Governor Perry, which requires women seeking abortion to have a sonogram of the fetus taken at least twenty-four hours before the abortion is performed. Patrick purported that the bill might stop more than 15,000 abortions annually with an estimated goal of eliminating one in five abortions. Regarding his estimation, Patrick stated the following: "There's no other piece of legislation anywhere else in the country that has that kind of impact... I don't take credit for it. It's God's hands."

Patrick's Mandatory Ultrasound Bill was initially halted by an injunction issued in Zurawski v. State of Texas, a legal challenge headed by the New York-based Center for Reproductive Rights. On January 10, 2012, the United States Court of Appeals for the Fifth Circuit ruled in Texas' favor and the law was allowed to take effect.

Patrick opposes abortion in cases of incest and rape. In January 2014, when he was asked about exceptions to outlawing abortion, Patrick said, "The only exception would be if the life of the mother was truly in danger…but that is rare."

=== Education ===
Patrick supports increasing the number of charter schools in the state.

In February 2011, Patrick, who at the time was vice chairman of the Texas senate's Committee on Education, spoke in favor of cutting an unspecified number of non-teaching positions from the state's public school districts, citing positions such as "math department supervisors" or "curriculum experts". At the time, Patrick cited a statistic later determined to be misleading by PolitiFact that Texas's 1,200+ public school districts, considered as a group, are the fifth-largest employer in the world.

Patrick has supported placing creationism within the public school curriculum in Texas, despite court rulings that such a policy would violate the First Amendment to the United States Constitution.

In 2019, Patrick pushed to increase Texas teachers' paychecks by $5,000.

In 2021, Patrick supported legislation to prevent public schools from requiring that students read writings by prominent civil rights figures, such as Susan B. Anthony, Cesar Chavez, and Martin Luther King Jr., when covering women's suffrage and the civil rights movement in social studies classes.

In 2022, Patrick pledged to end tenure for new hires at Texas public universities. He also said that he intended to revoke tenure for faculty who teach critical race theory. He supported 2023 legislation banning diversity, equity and inclusion offices at public universities.

In April 2025, Patrick championed the passage of Senate Bill 2, a school voucher program that established education savings accounts using public funds for private school tuition. In 2026, Patrick threatened to terminate funding for schools that did not remove over 2,000 books he considered "dirty, filthy and vulgar" that included titles about Jewish identity and the Holocaust such as Night by Elie Wiesel.

=== Gun laws ===
Patrick generally supports gun rights.

After the 2019 El Paso shooting, Patrick listed factors that he believed contributed to the shooting, starting off with video games, saying, "We've always had guns, always had evil, but I see a video game industry that teaches young people to kill."

In 2019, Patrick called for requiring background checks for gun sales between two strangers. He later backed away from this position, instead throwing his support behind legislation to expand gun rights, including constitutional carry.

=== Illegal immigration ===
Patrick opposes illegal immigration. As a talk radio host, he reserved some of his "most hard-edged oratory for illegal immigrants." Patrick expressed support for Arizona's SB 1070 immigration enforcement law, and supports passing a similar law in Texas that would allow local law enforcement to ask lawfully-stopped individuals about their immigration status and would make it a state misdemeanor to be present in Texas as an undocumented immigrant. Questions arose during the 2014 lieutenant governor's race about the immigration status of one of Patrick's employees, Miguel "Mike" Andrade. Patrick and Andrade offered different recollections about Andrade's employment. The matter was raised by one of Patrick's opponents, Jerry Patterson, who questioned Patrick's declared commitment to halt undocumented immigration.

As Lieutenant Governor, Patrick moved to keep National Guard troops sent to the Texas-Mexico border during the undocumented immigration surge of 2014 indefinitely, rather than until March 2015, as originally planned. Patrick's 2015 budget in the Texas Senate called for spending $815 million on border security, which he said was more than the previous seven years combined. Governor Greg Abbott signed the measure—for about $800 million—into law. In a June 2018 interview on Fox Business Network, Patrick estimated that 30 million undocumented immigrants lived in the U.S.

=== LGBT rights ===
In November 2012, Patrick asked then-Texas Attorney General Greg Abbott's office to issue an opinion on the constitutionality of government entities providing domestic partner insurance benefits. An amendment to the Texas Constitution in 2005 limits marriage to heterosexual relationships and prohibits similar, alternative legal arrangements. Patrick did not disclose his own views on same-sex marriage or civil unions for same-sex couples. He told the Houston Chronicle that his request was prompted by Dallas County's November 2012 decision and an Austin-area public school districts' October 2012 decision to join other Texas cities and counties in extending benefits to their unmarried employees' heterosexual or homosexual partners.

In 2014, after a federal court ruled that Texas' ban on same-sex marriage was unconstitutional, Patrick expressed his opposition to same-sex marriage, and vowed to fight such court decisions should he be elected to the Lt. Governor's office. He argued that if the state ban was removed, then it would lead to the legalization of bigamy, pedophilia and incest.

Patrick strongly opposed HERO, an unsuccessful Houston ordinance intended to establish legal protections for gay and transgender residents along with some other classes, as he claimed that the ordinance would lead to sexual predators being freely able to enter women's restrooms. He has stated that if necessary, he would support legislation to require people to use the bathroom that corresponds to the gender listed on their birth certificates.

Hours after the 2016 Orlando nightclub shooting, Patrick tweeted a picture of the Bible verse, "Do not be deceived: God cannot be mocked. A man reaps what he sows. Galatians 6:7." An adviser released a statement that the tweet had been pre-scheduled, and it was later deleted. He issued a statement on the incident, again stating that the tweet was pre-planned and that "I didn't pull down the FB post & tweet because God's word is wrong. His word is never wrong ... I took it down to stop the hateful comments and the misinformation being spread of God's message to all of us- straight or gay."

In May 2016, Patrick criticized the Obama administration after it released a directive stating that all public schools must allow transgender students to use the bathroom and locker facilities that correspond with their identified gender, stating that, on the prospect of the federal government withholding funding for Texas schools for not following the directive, "he can keep his 30 pieces of silver [and that w]e will not yield to blackmail from the president of the United States." In 2017, Patrick strongly advocated for a bathroom bill that would prohibit transgender students at public schools from using any restroom other than that of their biological sex. Patrick described the legislation as a "legislative priority." Patrick encouraged state Senator Lois Kolkhorst of Brenham to introduce a bathroom bill similar to a previous law adopted in 2016 in North Carolina, and strongly pushed for it at its proposal on January 5, 2017. Texas House Speaker Joe Straus of San Antonio, a moderate Republican, said that the measure is not an important matter for lower chamber.

In April 2019, Patrick called Democratic presidential candidate Beto O'Rourke "light in the loafers", a slur often used to insinuate someone as gay, though O'Rourke is heterosexual. He also called O'Rourke a "moron." Patrick later stated that while he stood by his comments, the insinuation was unintentional.

=== Voting rights ===
In 2020, Patrick referred to vote-by-mail expansion efforts during the COVID-19 pandemic as a "scam by Democrats to steal the election."

In 2021, Patrick presided over the passage of legislation in the Texas Senate that restricted voting methods, including prohibiting local boards from sending applications for mail-in ballots to voters.

In 2022, Patrick's campaign sent out a mass mailing to Republican voters across Texas with inaccurate instructions on how to send requests for absentee ballots. The mailing included return envelopes that were addressed to the Texas secretary of state's address when they should have been to local election offices. Patrick's campaign defended the inaccurate instructions, saying it "gave voters an added layer of comfort" not to have to mail sent to "Blue County election officials."

=== Cannabis ===
In 2019, Patrick opposed a bill that would have decriminalized simple possession of cannabis in Texas. After the Texas House passed the bill, he announced that it was dead on arrival in the Senate.

In 2021, during an interview, Patrick expressed that he was open to some medical cannabis changes, while he downplayed the more ambitious efforts. He said: "We're not gonna turn this into California where anybody can get a slip from a doctor and go down to some retail store and say 'You know, I got a headache today so I need marijuana,' because that's just a veil for legalizing it for recreational use."

In March 2025, amid debates over THC regulation, Patrick visited The Happy Cactus Apothecary, an Austin hemp store with strict age verification. When asked for ID, Patrick replied, "I'm Dan Patrick," opting not to show it. Later, at a press conference with state senator Charles Perry and law enforcement, Patrick reiterated concerns over industry practices regarding minor protection.

In the 89th legislative session, Patrick pushed for the passage of SB 3, which would ban the sale of consumable hemp products in the state, including those that contained delta-8-THC. The bill made it through the legislature, but Abbott vetoed it; Abbott pushed for "regulation" similar to the alcohol industry as opposed to the outright ban. Abbott included the issue of THC regulation in the two special legislative sessions he called over the summer of 2025, but due to continued disagreement with Patrick, comprehensive legislation on the issue failed to pass.

On the issue, Patrick has said, "I am and will always be against any pathway that could open the door to recreational marijuana in our state."

=== Statutory rape laws ===
Patrick was interviewed extensively on ABC's 20/20 segment "The Age of Consent: When Young Love Is a Sex Crime," defending his position on the strict Texas statutory rape laws. "While it seems unfair, he was 19, she was 15," says Patrick, "That's the price you pay. Even if you end up getting married."

=== Confederate monuments ===
Patrick is a strong supporter of maintaining Confederate monuments on public display, despite opposition from civil rights groups who consider the statues as a defense of the institution of slavery and of the Civil War. As one of six members of the board that oversees the Texas State Capitol grounds, Patrick described the need: "to learn from history all of our history, including events and times that many would like to forget. ... Our goal should be to have a meaningful dialogue for future generations so those moments in our history are not repeated."

=== Ten Commandments ===
On June 21, 2024, Patrick, stated that he would seek to pass a similar bill to Louisiana's House Bill 71 requiring the Ten Commandments in schools in the next legislative session. He criticized Speaker of the Texas House of Representatives Dade Phelan for failing to put the bill (Senate Bill 1515) to a vote on the floor in the previous legislative session.

In May 2025, the Texas Legislature passed SB 10 which requires every classroom to visibly display a poster containing the Ten Commandments, sized at least 16 by 20 inches. The law has come under legal scrutiny and its enforcement has been blocked in some Texas schools while the courts examine the issue.

=== COVID-19 pandemic ===
In an interview with Fox News host Tucker Carlson on March 23, 2020, Patrick stated that he was willing to risk his life from the COVID-19 pandemic if it would avoid an economic shutdown, which he stated would negatively impact subsequent generations. Patrick also stated that he thought many grandparents agreed with him on this. Patrick later moderated his rhetoric while continuing to show skepticism of shutting down the economy.

Patrick worked to increase access to hydroxychloroquine, an unproven drug to treat the coronavirus which President Trump promoted. On April 7, 2020, Patrick announced the creation of a task force to make recommendations on how to re-open Texas's economy.

Patrick again garnered controversy on April 21, when he defended his previous comments on the pandemic by saying "And what I said when I was with you that night, there are more important things than living. And that's saving this country for my children, and my grandchildren and saving this country for all of us. And I don't want to die, nobody wants to die, but man, we got to take some risks and get back in the game, and get this country back up and running."

In May 2020, Patrick paid a $7,000 fine imposed on a Dallas businesswoman after she defied Texas's lockdown orders in order to keep her hair salon open. He said, "Seven days in jail, no bail and a $7,000 fine is outrageous."

=== Donald Trump ===
Patrick endorsed Texas Senator Ted Cruz for the 2016 Republican presidential primaries and served as his Texas campaign chairman. After Donald Trump became the Republican nominee, Patrick endorsed him and eventually became the Texas state chairman for his campaign. Trump won Texas by 9 percentage points, the closest result since 1996. In January 2018, Patrick stated that he considered Presidents Trump and Ronald Reagan as the two greatest presidents in his lifetime, and the Austin American-Statesman described Patrick as an "ardent defender" of Trump.

At a political rally for President Trump on October 17, 2019, Patrick told a crowd of 20,000 that liberals "are not our opponents, they are our enemy."

After Joe Biden won the 2020 election and Trump made false claims of fraud, Patrick backed Trump as he refused to concede. Patrick said he would pay up to $1 million for reports of voter fraud across the country. In October 2021, Patrick paid the first reward of $25,000 to a Pennsylvania poll worker who reported a man that voted twice.

=== Child pornography ===
In 2025, Patrick applauded the unanimous passage of Texas Senate Bill 20 in the Texas Senate and called it "a priority" to protect children in Texas, and Texas citizens and thanked Pete Flores for his work on "this important issue." He later described the bill as part of the "bold, conservative agenda" that the Texas legislature passed during the 2025 legislative session.

Some critics described the law as unconstitutional, saying it violated the Free Speech Clause of the First Amendment which prohibits abridgement of freedom of speech and the press, including the legal precedent set in Ashcroft v. Free Speech Coalition. Much of the controversy regarding the law involves the broad language pertaining to "obscene" pornographic images as including A.I.-created, animated, and cartoon depictions, with some critics arguing it could have a chilling effect on anime, manga, graphic novels, and other media produced, distributed, or created within Texas.

=== Alamo historical interpretation ===
Throughout his tenure Patrick has been vocal about his views regarding the interpretation of the role the Alamo has played in Texas history. He wants the focus to be on the 13-day siege and the 1836 Battle of the Alamo and portraying the Texians who lost their lives in the battle as heroes. Patrick argues that other interpretations which stray from this narrative are influenced by "political correctness".

In 2018, the State Board of Education was reviewing potential changes to the social study curriculum and a workgroup recommended removing the word "heroic" from its description of the Alamo defenders calling the term "value charged". Patrick and other statewide officals condemned the move and the change was backtracked.

Beginning in 2018, the city of San Antonio and, the General Land Office, and the Alamo Endowment initiated a massive renovation project which sought to expand the size of the historic plaza and construct a new history museum. Part of the renovation plans included relocating the Alamo Cenotaph from its current location in front of the Alamo to the edge of the plaza in order to return the area to a more period accurate look. The proposed move of the Cenotaph became highly controversial as opponents viewed the change as disrespectful to those who died. Patrick opposed the move and condemned Land Commissioner George P. Bush's handling of the Alamo renovations and threatened to remove oversight of the Alamo from Bush's office. The Texas Historical Commission voted against the move due to popular feedback, and in 2024 the City of San Antonio ceeded control over the Cenotaph to the General Land Office.

In July 2021, an event at the Bullock Texas State History Museum promoting the book Forget the Alamo: The Rise and Fall of an American Myth was canceled less than four hours prior to its scheduled start allegedly due to complaints by Patrick and other state officials. Patrick wrote on Twitter, "As a member of the Preservation Board, I told staff to cancel this event as soon as I found out about it. Like efforts to move the Cenotaph, which I also stopped, this fact-free rewriting of TX history has no place." Chris Tomlinson, one of the authors of the book accused Patrick of censorship responding "[Patrick] takes credit for oppressing free speech and policing thought in Texas. [The Bullock Museum] proves it is a propaganda outlet. As for his fact-free comment, well, a dozen people professional historians disagree." Later in the month, Patrick called on the University of Texas to host its own event to discuss the book.

Patrick was involved in the departure of Kate Rogers from her position leading the redevelopment of the Alamo in October 2025. Local leaders from Bexar County and the City of San Antonio favored a broader interpretation that included the Indigenous people of the area and the role slavery played in the Texas Revolution. Rogers has described her role in the redevelopment as an effort to bridge competing perspectives among state and local officials, historians, and community members. Patrick called Rogers on October 23, 2025 and she resigned from the Alamo Trust the following day.

In November 2025, Rogers filed a federal lawsuit against Patrick, Texas Land Commissioner Dawn Buckingham, and the Alamo Trust. On August 25, 2026, U.S. District Judge Xavier Rodriguez rejected some of the defendants' motions to dismiss Rogers' allegations and ruled that the rest of Rogers' claims could proceed, including her allegations that Patrick and Buckingham violated her First Amendment rights by pressing for her resignation from the trust.

== Personal life ==
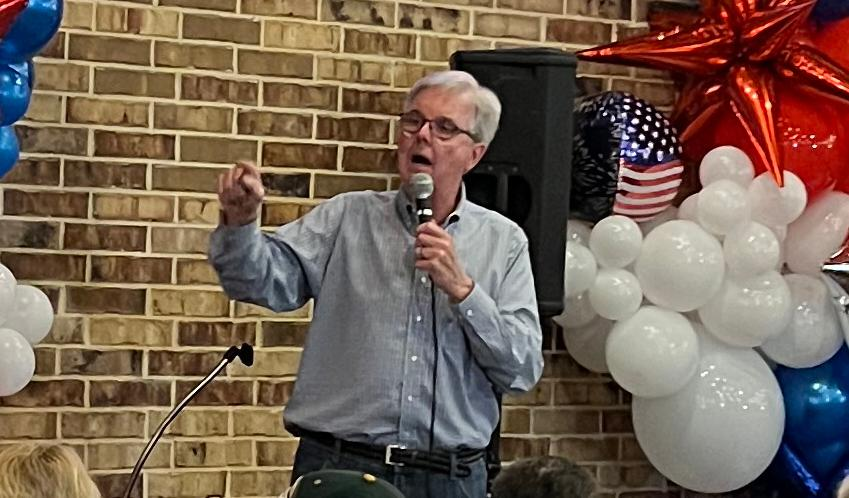
Lt. Gov Dan Patrick of Texas speaking to the Montgomery County Texas Tea Party in The Woodlands, Texas on November 7, 2022.

Patrick's first marriage ended in divorce. His second wife is Janetlea "Jan" Patricia Rankin, a former teacher. They were married in 1975 and live in the Houston suburb of Cypress. They have two children, Ryan and Shane. Ryan served as a district judge from Harris County, Texas, and swore his father into office as the lieutenant governor in 2015. In July 2017, Ryan Patrick was chosen to be U.S. Attorney for the Southern District of Texas by U.S. President Donald Trump, and the United States Senate subsequently confirmed him.

Patrick, an evangelical Christian, is a member of various Christian organizations, including Fellowship of Christian Athletes and the International Bible Society, and has served as guest pastor of his church, the Second Baptist Church Houston. He is very outspoken about his Christian faith, and he stated in his inauguration speech upon becoming lieutenant governor that "I respect all faiths and religions, but I am a Christian first, a conservative second and a Republican third, and I praise Jesus for this moment and this day."

While growing up, Patrick and his family were "not very religious." After moving to Houston, he and his wife attended a Catholic church, but he joined a Baptist church soon after learning about it. Though Patrick was a member of the Second Baptist Church Houston since 1992, he stated he was not truly a Christian until March 1994. He also considered going into Christian ministry for a time. Patrick was baptized in the Jordan River during a trip to Israel in 2016.

== Electoral history ==
=== 2022 ===
2022 general election, Lieutenant Governor
Party	Candidate	Votes	%
Republican	Dan Patrick (incumbent)	4,307,483	53.80
Democratic	Mike Collier	3,478,063	43.44
Libertarian	Shanna Steele	221,588	2.77
Total votes		8,007,134	100.00
Republican hold			

=== 2018 ===
2018 general election, Lieutenant Governor
Party	Candidate	Votes	%
Republican	Dan Patrick (incumbent)	4,260,990	51.30
Democratic	Mike Collier	3,860,865	46.49
Libertarian	Kerry Douglas McKennon	183,516	2.21
Total votes		8,305,371	100.00
Republican hold			

=== 2014 ===
2014 Texas lieutenant gubernatorial election
Party	Candidate	Votes	%
Republican	Dan Patrick	2,718,406	58.13
Democratic	Leticia Van de Putte	1,810,720	38.72
Libertarian	Robert Butler	119,581	2.55
Green	Chandra Courtney	27,651	0.59
Majority		907,686	19.41
Total votes		4,676,358	100.00
Turnout			33.34
Republican hold			

Republican primary runoff results, May 27, 2014: Lieutenant Governor
Party	Candidate	Votes	%
Republican	Dan Patrick	488,150	65.04
Republican	David Dewhurst (incumbent)	262,303	34.95
Total votes		750,453	100

Republican primary results, March 4, 2014: Lieutenant Governor
Party	Candidate	Votes	%
Republican	Dan Patrick	552,692	41.43
Republican	David Dewhurst (incumbent)	377,856	28.32
Republican	Todd Staples	236,949	17.76
Republican	Jerry Patterson	166,399	12.47
Total votes		1,333,896	100.00

=== 2010 ===
2010 Texas general election: Senate District 7
Party	Candidate	Votes	%
Republican	Dan Patrick (incumbent)	184,704	86.41
Libertarian	Lee Coughran	29,048	13.59
Majority		155,656	72.82
Total votes		213,752	100.00
Republican hold			

=== 2006 ===
2006 Texas general election: Senate District 7
Party	Candidate	Votes	%
Republican	Dan Patrick	118,067	69.19
Democratic	F. Michael Kubosh	52,586	30.81
Majority		65,481	38.37
Total votes		170,653	100.00
Republican hold			

Republican primary, 2006: Senate District 7
Party	Candidate	Votes	%
Republican	Dan Patrick	28,860	68.82
Republican	Peggy Hamric	6,900	16.45
Republican	Joe Nixon	3,629	8.65
Republican	Mark Ellis	2,545	6.07
Total votes		41,934	100.00

== Works ==
- Patrick, Dan (2002). The Second Most Important Book You Will Ever Read: A Personal Challenge to Read the Bible, Publisher: Thomas Nelson, Inc., ISBN 0-7852-6286-5
- The Heart of Texas (film). Heart Of Texas The Movie. Dan Patrick, Executive Producer. 2009 Plaid Shirt Pictures and Media Tech, Inc.

== See also ==
Party political offices
Preceded by David Dewhurst	Republican nominee for Lieutenant Governor of Texas; 2014, 2018, 2022, 2026	Most recent
Texas Senate
Preceded by Jon Lindsay	Member of the Texas Senate from the 7th district 2007–2015	Succeeded by Paul Bettencourt
Political offices
Preceded by David Dewhurst	Lieutenant Governor of Texas; 2015–present	Incumbent
