= SafeClear Program =

Traffic program

The SafeClear Program is a traffic program in the city of Houston, Texas, United States. The program requires that vehicles which are stalled due to any reason (engine troubles, out of gas, etc.) on Houston freeways be immediately towed. The purpose of the program is to reduce traffic congestion and to make freeways safer by making freeways clearer. The reasoning is that many freeway accidents are the result of disabled vehicles.

== History ==
The program was initially created in 2005 by Houston Mayor Bill White. SafeClear initially required that the driver of the stalled vehicle pay to have it towed off the freeway, but at a lower rate than typically charged by towing companies. The rate was set by the city of Houston. The program was created to relieve the severe backups on Houston's freeways during the morning and evening rush hours and to make the freeways safer.

=== Initial controversy ===
The program encountered great controversy when it was first implemented for several reasons. Tow truck drivers claimed that the program hurt their business, leading nine wrecker companies to file lawsuits against the city. Mayor White testified in court in the case. The tow truck drivers claimed the program violated federal law. In addition the SafeClear Program has been blamed for causing the deaths of people while trying to get their cars off the freeway without having to pay fees to the tow truck drivers. State lawmakers were also opposed to the program. State Senator and fellow Democrat John Whitmire marshaled 30 out of 31 Texas State Senators' votes to make the SafeClear program illegal. They demanded and later received improvements to the program.

=== Program reform ===
Mayor White responded to the controversy and criticism by changing the rules of the program and the towing laws, including free towing for limited distances (one mile) funded by the city. Distances after the initial mile could then be set by the towing company. Improvements also included strict licensing of SafeClear wreckers including criminal background checks and requiring revenue generated from the program to enter a mobility fund instead of general city coffers. White also rode with a wrecker and conducted several studies of the program's effectiveness.

With a budget shortfall, Mayor Annise Parker changed the structure in 2011 in which a modest fee charged to the vehicle owner of $50.00 for a tow and $30.00 for roadside assistance. For those that are unable to pay at the point of service, storage fees will be applied after the first 48 hours in addition to the $50 towing charge.

=== Results of the program ===
While the program has received stiff opposition, some studies have found that the program has helped. A study, conducted by Rice University and Texas A&M University one year after the program's implementation, found that the number of freeway crashes decreased by 10.4%, decreasing by nearly 2,000 crashes. According to these results, drivers in Houston saved approximately $35 million by the implementation of the program. However Suzanne Poole, president of the Houston Professional Towing Association, says those numbers are misleading saying "The price increase in gas and a lot of people are carpooling or using mass transit which those figures are reflected in how many people are using the buses. But also the wrecker drivers with the SafeClear program no longer call out officers to minor accidents, they simply give them the blue forms to send to the state. If they don't send those forms in, those accidents aren't reported. So the actual figures are inaccurate." However, Suzanne Poole's claims are not backed by substantial evidence. A study by the city found that freeway crashes decreased by over 20%, over 1,000 crashes, during the first two years it was implemented.

In regards to traffic congestion, a study by KHOU-TV found that average drive times increased at 86% of freeways into Houston six months after the program was implemented compared to before the program. However, some claim that more cars were on the roads during these six months and that construction on the freeways, particularly on U.S. Route 59, caused drive times to increase.
