= Paul Bettencourt =

American politician

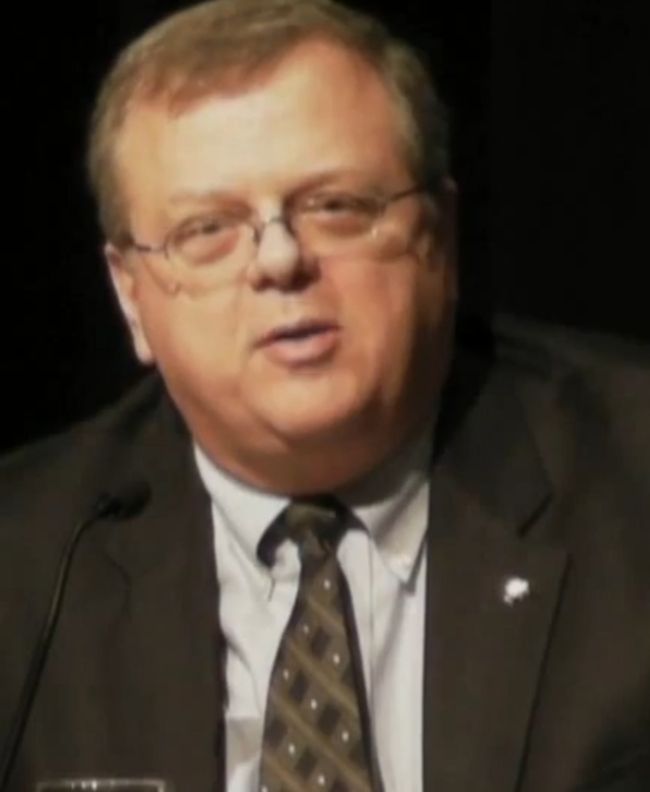
- Bettencourt in 2012

Majority Leader of the Texas Senate
- In office January 26, 2016 – January 12, 2021
- Preceded by: Kelly Hancock
- Succeeded by: Larry Taylor

Member of the Texas Senate from the 7th district
- Incumbent
- Assumed office January 13, 2015
- Preceded by: Dan Patrick

Tax Assessor-Collector of Harris County
- In office 1999–2009
- Preceded by: Carl Smith
- Succeeded by: Leo Vasquez

Personal details
- Born: Paul David Bettencourt; October 20, 1958 (age 67) Harris County, Texas, U.S.
- Party: Republican
- Spouse: Susan Sladic
- Children: 2
- Education: Texas A&M University (BS)
- Website: Office website Campaign website

Paul David Bettencourt (born October 20, 1958) is an American politician and businessman based out of Houston, Texas, who serves as a Republican member of the Texas State Senate from District 7. On January 13, 2015, he succeeded state Senator Dan Patrick of Houston, who successfully ran for Lieutenant Governor of Texas.

== Political career ==
=== Harris County Tax Assessor-Collector ===
From 1998 to early in 2008, Bettencourt was the Tax Assessor-Collector of his native Harris County, the third largest county in the United States. This role is responsible for collecting and dispersing property taxes, and voter registration.

Bettencourt won reelection in 2000, 2004, and 2008.

==== Controversy ====
The Democratic Party and plaintiffs filed suit and requested a temporary restraining order against the Voter Registrar Bettencourt after the 2008 election, asking a Federal Judge to block the counting of 7000+ provisional ballots from the November 2008 election. However, the temporary restraining order was denied by the Judge. All 7000+ provisional ballots were reviewed by Election Officials, and either rejected or accepted and then electronically counted.

The Democratic Party also alleged that Bettencourt purposely rejected new voter applications to limit the number of new voters in Harris County. In December 2008, Bettencourt stepped down from his role shortly after winning reelection, and a day after the Democratic Party levied these allegations. Bettencourt indicated that he was leaving his role as the Tax Assessor-Collector for a job in the private sector, making the decision weeks after winning reelection for a third time.

In 2009 Bettencourt started Bettencourt Tax Advisors LLC, a tax advising business that specializes in helping Texas homeowners protest their property taxes. Bettencourt refers to himself as "The Taxman."

=== Texas State Senate ===
==== 2014 election ====
Bettencourt ran for the Texas State Senate in 2014 again enlisted the help of top Republican Strategist Allen Blakemore.

==== Tenure ====
Bettencourt has also warned of serious pension liability problems in Texas and has proposed long-term market-based reforms which he claims will not impact those nearing retirement and have already paid significantly into the pension systems.

==== Tenure ====
He authored a bill that the Texas Senate passed in 2019 that would move bond, debt and tax elections to the November general elections and limit the length of propositions.

==== Harris County Elections ====
In 2021, Bettencourt sponsored Senate Bill 1111 which prohibited the use of private P.O. Boxes for voter registration. After the bill passed, Bettencourt alleged that this was a known problem in Harris County.

Democrats won most of the Harris County elections during the 2022 midterms. Following these Democratic wins, Republicans complained of issues at polling sites in Republican areas including running out of paper. In response Bettencourt authored a dozen bills during the 2023 session, seeking to change how Harris County managed elections. The bills included Senate Bill 1750 which returned the election duties to the Harris County Clerk and the Tax Assessor-Collector, a role Bettencourt once held. The bill only applied to counties with over 3.5 million residents, only Harris County meets this standard. Senate Bill 1933 allows the Texas Secretary of State to have oversight over key parts of the election functions typically managed by the county. If an election related complaint is filed with the Secretary of State, they then will investigate and if the office finds "good cause" they can impose administrative oversight by the Secretary of State.

In 2025, Bettencourt filed a complaint with the Texas Secretary of State alleging that Harris County had several registered voters whose listed addresses were PO Boxes in violation of state law. Annette Ramirez, Harris County Tax Assessor-Collector, responded to Bettencourt's complaint stating that the Harris County Tax Office has not violated any election laws. Following Bettencourt's complaint, the Texas Secretary of State, Jane Nelson, indicated that this could result in state oversight by her office in Harris County elections. Bettencourt's complaint did not allege that those registered to vote via a PO Box address actually voted in the last election.

=== Radio host ===
Bettencourt is a conservative talk radio host on KSEV, owned by his predecessor Dan Patrick.

Texas Senate
| Preceded by Dan Patrick | Member of the Texas Senate from the 7th district 2015–present | Incumbent |
| Preceded by Kelly Hancock | Majority Leader of the Texas Senate; 2016–2021 | Succeeded by Larry Taylor |
