= Surviving Antarctica: Reality TV 2083 =

2005 novel by Andrea White

Surviving Antarctica
- Author: Andrea White
- Original title: No Child's Game
- Cover artist: Steve Stone
- Language: English
- Genre: Science fiction Adventure novel
- Publisher: HarperCollins
- Publication date: 2005
- Publication place: United States
- Pages: 428
- ISBN: 978-0-439-02535-5

Surviving Antarctica: Reality TV 2083 is a novel written by Andrea White.

In 2006, the book won the Golden Spur Award given by the Texas State Reading Association for the best book by a Texas author, and was nominated for a Texas Bluebonnet Award for children's literature.

== Plot ==
Surviving Antarctica takes place in the year 2083 in a television-crazed United States. America as a whole has undergone extreme economic hardship, with people living in shacks and shantytowns reminiscent of Hoovervilles during the Great Depression. The Secretary of "Entertainment" is the Head of the Department of Entertainment, or the DOE. Public schools shut down and are replaced with "Edu-TV" which are lessons with Interactive Quizzes on a television screen. It is mandatory and only goes up to Eighth Grade. After completing the required Eighth Year of Edu-TV, one must pay for High School and College on their own. In order to pay for further education, a few sponsored scholarships are given out, the most popular of which is a game of pure chance called "The Toss". The administer calls out a number, and the 14-year-old wishing for the full scholarship rolls two dice, hoping it will land on that number.

In Edu-TV the Social Studies/History show is called "Historical Survivor". The Secretary of DOE gathers a "lucky few" to re-enact parts of history. Five kids (Robert, Polly, Grace, Andrew, and Billy) see an advertisement by the Secretary of Entertainment, Dolly Jabasco, (nicknamed "Hot Sauce") for a new Historical Survivor Series that features kids. It is called "Historical Survivor: Antarctica". She offers $10,000 to whoever is chosen to re-enact the expedition of Robert F. Scott and an extra $90,000 to the MVP (most valuable player). Out of 4,000 other applicants, these five kids are accepted. Unbeknownst to them, the Secretary has corneal camcorder implants placed in all the kids' left eyes to film the show instead of a camera crew due to deaths to cameramen in previous seasons and to cut costs. The Secretary has also planned several different calamities to happen to the kids on their journey as a harsh allusion to similar obstacles faced by Scott. Unbeknownst to the Secretary, a group of night shift employees, mainly focusing on a new worker named Steve, engage in acts of sabotage like talking to a few of the kids to help the kids on their way.

All five come from completely different backgrounds and walks of life, but will have to cooperate to survive Antarctica. Through a series of tragedies and misfortunes, they end up in the middle of nowhere, frostbitten and hungry. But will they get help from the one person nobody would expect- the camera crews?

== Title ==
Surviving Antarctica was originally published as No Child's Game: Reality TV 2083. Harper Collins called the author and told her that teens and pre-teens (the age group the novel was directed to) would be less likely to buy if the title had "child" in its title. It was then changed to Surviving Antarctica: Reality TV 2083. Scholastic bought it as the original title, then they ended up selling it, after another publisher bought No Child's Game, as Surviving Antarctica: Reality TV 2083. Even if the titles are different, the story and text are the same.
