= City Hall Fellows =

Non-profit organization

City Hall Fellows was a non-partisan, non-profit organization that was founded in March 2007 by Bethany Rubin Henderson, who later was selected to be a White House Fellow.

City Hall Fellows placed recent college graduates in fellowship positions in local governments across the United States. Fellows worked with high-level local officials (typically department heads) and functioned as full-time staff members in their assigned departments, working on projects and tasks designated by their host city. Fellows each worked on an individual project within their assigned department as well as two cohort projects throughout the year. In addition, Fellows participated in an intensive and comprehensive Civic Leadership Development Program spanning the entire fellowship term.

City Hall Fellows fellowships were highly competitive, and candidates underwent a rigorous application process. All applicants had to submit an application package that includes a cover sheet, four short essay questions, a resume, transcript and recommendation letter. From these packages, a group of finalists were selected who traveled to the appropriate host city for a day-long interview conducted by City Hall Fellows and senior city employees in both group and individual settings. A final cohort was selected after these interviews. In 2009, nearly 500 people applied for 16 slots. More than 150 individuals served as City Hall Fellows between 2008 - 2015. The program eventually was taken in house by the City of San Francisco, and today operates as the San Francisco Fellows program. For nearly a decade thereafter, the nonprofit entity City Hall Fellows served as a resource and mentoring hub for young local government employees in the Bay Area, led by alumni of the City Hall Fellows Fellowship program.

== Duration and Locations ==
The City Hall Fellows fellowship was a full-time, 12-month position. Fellows were grouped in cohorts of six to ten within each host city. Fellows worked for the cities of San Francisco, CA, Baton Rouge, Louisiana or Houston, TX.

== Civic Leadership Development Program ==
Through City Hall Fellows' proprietary Civic Leadership Development Program, Fellows were introduced to the history, organization, and politics of their host city, gained an in-depth understanding of city mechanics (such as the budget process and civil service), toured city facilities, explored public policy issues facing America's cities and dialogued with leading city officials and other policy makers and policy influencers about the mechanics, politics and challenges of local governance. Fellows also completed service projects for their city's leaders, including developing policy recommendations for review by senior city officials.

As part of the program, Fellows also spent 2–3 days in their state capital interfacing with state government leaders, and attended a three-day national convention in Washington, D.C., where they met with their elected officials as well as national urban policy leaders.

== Awards and recognition ==
- The Case Foundation named City Hall Fellows Executive Director Michael Rocco a 2012 Fearless Changemaker and City Hall Fellows a Fearless Project.
- American City & County Magazine named City Hall Fellow's San Francisco Program a 2011 Crown Community for being an innovative and effective public-private partnership.
- Babble.com named founder Bethany Rubin Henderson its 2011 Mominee of the Year (Politics) for her work with City Hall Fellows, and awarded $5,000 to City Hall Fellows in her honor.
- The New Leaders Council named Bethany Rubin Henderson to its 40 Under 40 list of Progressive Political Entrepreneurs of 2011 for her work with City Hall Fellows.
- Baton Rouge Program Director Kathy Fletcher Victorian was named the Foundation for the Mid-South‘s 2010 Louisiana Do-Gooder of the Year for her successes in empowering local citizen leaders. The Foundation awarded $50,000 to City Hall Fellows in Kathy’s honor.
- City Hall Fellows won the first-ever Coaches’ Award at the Social Innovation Fast Pitch competition in 2009, sponsored by Los Angeles Social Venture Partners.
- City Hall Fellows was selected as one of Echoing Green's fourteen funding ventures in 2009, selected from among over 1,000 applicants.
- San Francisco Magazine named City Hall Fellows “Best of the Bay Area 2008″, deeming the program "Best Political Foot in the Door."
