= John Green Chambers =

American pharmacist and politician (1798–1884)

John Green Chambers (2 April 1798 – 27 August 1884) was an American politician.

Chambers was born in Mecklenburg County, Virginia, on 2 April 1798, and worked as a physician and pharmacist. He later moved to Titus County, Texas, and was elected to the Texas Senate, representing District 7 from 7 November 1859 to 4 November 1861. By 1880, Chambers moved into the city of Daingerfield, where he died on 27 August 1884.
