= Robert Eckels =

American attorney (born 1957)

Robert Allen Eckels (born March 14, 1957) is an attorney, businessman and politician from Houston, Texas. From 1983 to 1995 he was a Republican member of the Texas State House of Representatives District 133, and from 1995 to 2007 was the County Judge of Harris County, Texas, the head executive of the County's governing body.
