= 2026 Texas gubernatorial election =

- November 3, 2026

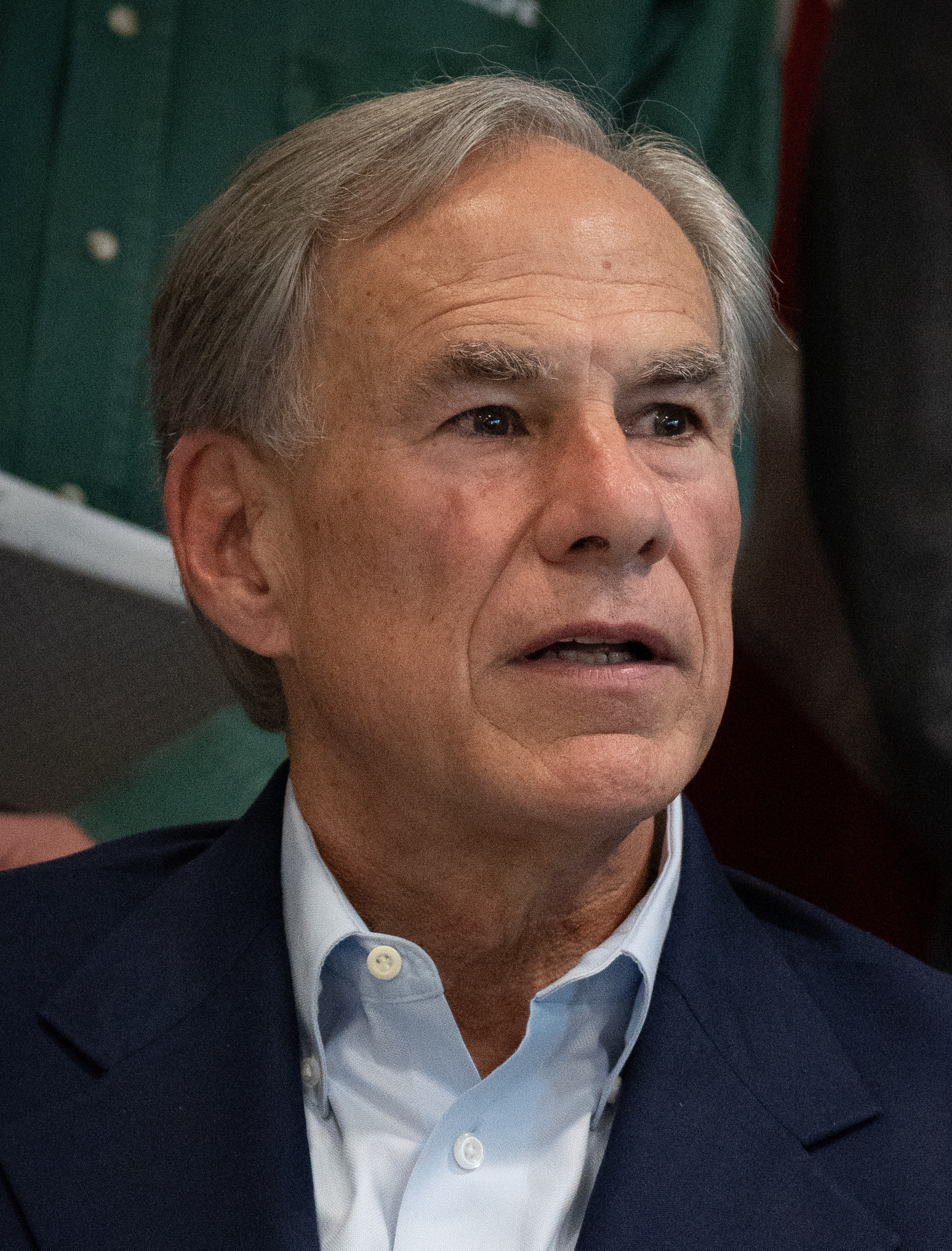
Nominee	Gina Hinojosa	Greg Abbott
Party	Democratic	Republican
Popular vote	5,232,690	4,525,990
Percentage	52.82%	45.69%
- Hinojosa: 40–50% 50–60% 60–70% 70–80% Abbott: 40–50% 50–60% 60–70% 70–80% 80–90% >90%
Governor before election
Greg Abbott
Republican
Elected Governor
Gina Hinojosa
Democratic

The 2026 Texas gubernatorial election took place on November 3, 2026, to elect the governor of Texas. Democratic state representative Gina Hinojosa defeated Republican incumbent Greg Abbott, who was seeking a record fourth term, in an upset victory.

Primary elections were held on March 3, 2026. Facing minimal opposition, Abbott won the Republican nomination with 82% of the vote. Hinojosa won the Democratic nomination with 59% of the vote over a field of candidates that included former congressman Chris Bell.

Hinojosa's win was part of a broad wave of victories for Democrats in Texas, who flipped every statewide office on the ballot from Republican control. Hinojosa is the first Democrat to win a gubernatorial election in Texas since Ann Richards in 1990, while Abbott is the first incumbent governor of Texas to lose reelection since Richards' reelection bid in 1994. Additionally, Hinojosa won the largest margin for a Democrat in the state since 1982.

== Republican primary ==
=== Candidates ===
==== Nominee ====
- Greg Abbott, incumbent governor (2015–present)

==== Eliminated in primary ====
- R.F. "Bob" Achgill, literary researcher and candidate for Bryan City Council in 2024
- Evelyn Brooks, member of the Texas State Board of Education from the 14th district (2023–present)
- Pete "Doc" Chambers, former lieutenant colonel in U.S. Army Special Forces
- Charles Andrew Crouch, author
- Arturo Espinosa, candidate in 2025 San Antonio mayoral election
- Mark V. Goloby, businessman and conservative activist
- Kenneth Hyde, contractor
- Stephen Samuelson, veteran
- Ronnie Tullos, project manager
- Nathaniel Welch, businessman

=== Endorsements ===
Greg Abbott

Executive branch officials

- Donald Trump, president of the United States (2017–2021, 2025–present)

Individuals

- Riley Gaines, conservative activist

Labor unions

- Associated Builders and Contractors of Texas
- Combined Law Enforcement Associations of Texas
- Dallas Police Association
- Fort Worth Police Officers Association
- Houston Police Officers Union
- International Brotherhood of Teamsters Texas
- International Longshoremen South Atlantic & Gulf Coast District Association
- National Border Patrol Council
- Teamsters Joint Council 58 and Joint Council 80
- UA Pipefitters Local 211
- UA Plumbers Local 68

Organizations

- National Federation of Independent Business Texas
- NRA Political Victory Fund
- Texas Alliance for Life
- Turning Point Action
- Young Conservatives of Texas

Newspapers

- Houston Chronicle
- San Antonio Express-News

=== Polling ===
Poll source	Date(s) administered	Sample size (Note: Key: A – all adults RV – registered voters LV – likely voters V – unclear)	Margin of error	Greg Abbott	Evelyn Brooks	Pete Chambers	Arturo Espinosa	Mark V. Goloby	Other	Undecided
YouGov	February 26 – March 2, 2026	1,668 (LV)	± 2.8%	72%	2%	11%	0%	0%	2% (Note: "Someone else" and "I [did/will] not vote in this primary" with 1%; R.F. "Bob" Achgill, Charles Andrew Crouch, Kenneth Hyde, Stephen Samuelson, Ronnie Tullos, and Nathaniel Welch with 0%)	13%
University of Texas/ Texas Politics Project	February 2–16, 2026	360 (LV)	± 5.2%	91%	1%	5%	1%	1%	2% (Note: "Someone else" with 2%; R.F. "Bob" Achgill, Charles Andrew Crouch, Kenneth Hyde, Stephen Samuelson, Ronnie Tullos, and Nathaniel Welch with 0%)	–

=== Results ===
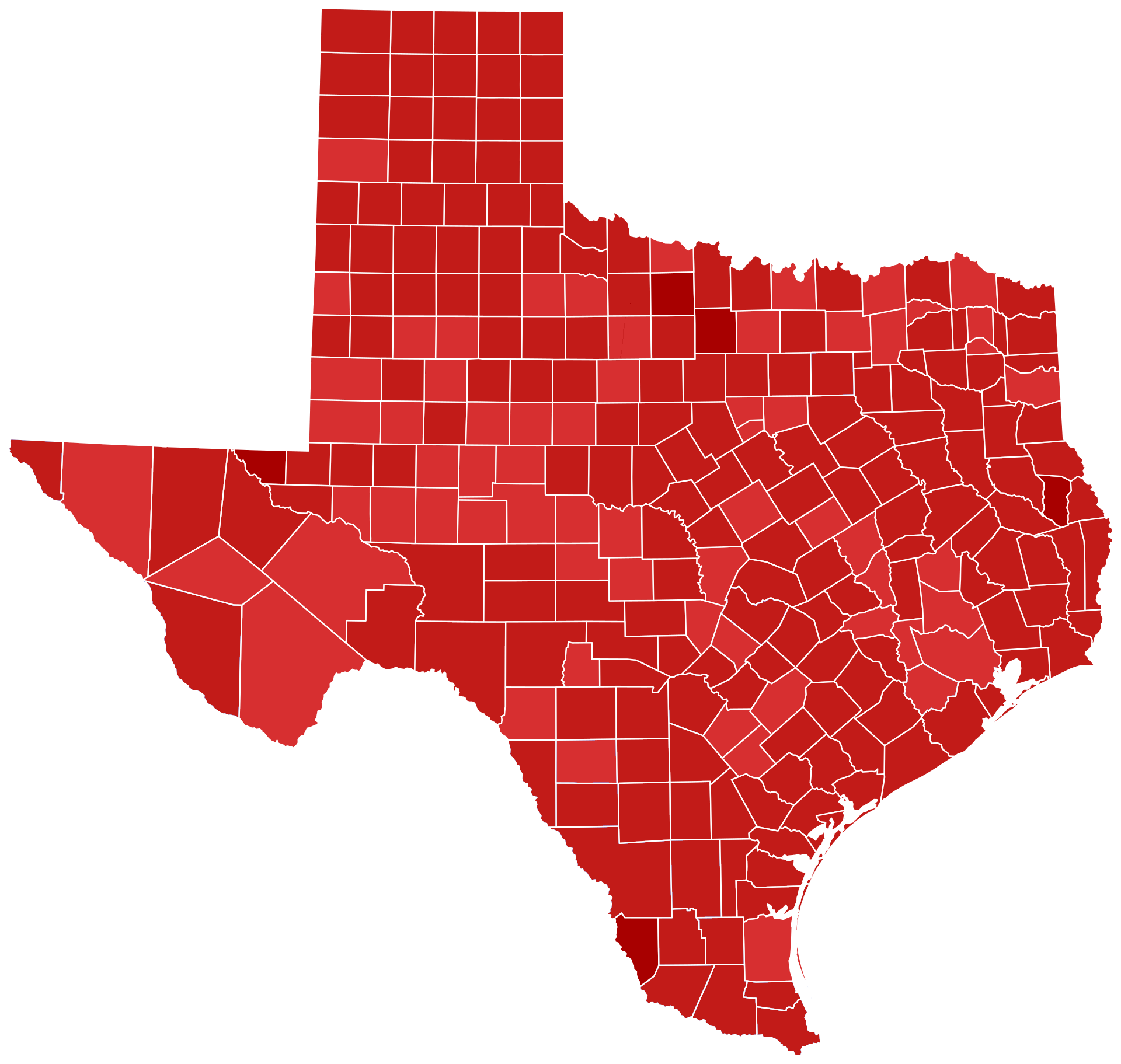
Results by county: Abbott—70–80% Abbott—80–90% Abbott—90–100%

Republican primary
Party	Candidate	Votes	%
Republican	Greg Abbott (incumbent)	1,764,924	81.8
Republican	Pete "Doc" Chambers	240,640	11.2
Republican	Evelyn Brooks	44,142	2.0
Republican	Arturo Espinosa	23,444	1.1
Republican	Charles Andrew Crouch	15,405	0.7
Republican	Kenneth Hyde	14,941	0.7
Republican	Nathaniel Welch	12,057	0.6
Republican	Mark V. Goloby	10,991	0.5
Republican	Stephen Samuelson	10,864	0.5
Republican	Ronnie Tullos	10,352	0.5
Republican	R.F. "Bob" Achgill	9,119	0.4
Total votes		2,156,879	100.0

== Democratic primary ==
=== Candidates ===
==== Nominee ====
- Gina Hinojosa, state representative from the 49th district (2017–present)

==== Eliminated in primary ====
- Patricia Abrego
- Chris Bell, former U.S. representative for Texas's 25th congressional district (2003–2005), nominee for governor in 2006, candidate for mayor of Houston in 2001 and 2015, and candidate for U.S. Senate in 2020
- Bobby Cole, rancher
- Carlton Hart, event manager
- Jose Navarro Balbuena, tax strategist
- Faizan Syed, manager
- Zach Vance, veteran
- Angela Villescaz, education and gun safety advocate

==== Withdrawn ====
- Benjamin Flores, Bay City councilor (ran for Land Commissioner, endorsed Hinojosa)
- Nick Pappas, Marine veteran (ran for Denton County judge)
- Andrew White, son of former governor Mark White, and candidate for governor in 2018 (endorsed Hinojosa)

==== Declined ====
- Jasmine Crockett, U.S. representative from Texas's 30th congressional district (2023–present) (ran for U.S. Senate, endorsed Hinojosa)
- Veronica Escobar, U.S. representative from Texas's 16th congressional district (2019–present) (running for re-election, endorsed Hinojosa)
- Clay Jenkins, Dallas County judge (Note: County executive) (2011–present)
- Ron Nirenberg, former mayor of San Antonio (2017–2025) (running for Bexar County Judge)
- Beto O'Rourke, former U.S. representative from Texas's 16th congressional district (2013–2019), nominee for governor in 2022, nominee for U.S. Senate in 2018, and candidate for president in 2020

=== Endorsements ===
Gina Hinojosa

U.S. senators

- Ruben Gallego, Arizona (2025–present)
- Chris Murphy, Connecticut (2013–present)

U.S. representatives

- Colin Allred, former TX-32 (2019–2025)
- Greg Casar, TX-35 (2023–present)
- Jasmine Crockett, TX-30 (2023–present)
- Lloyd Doggett, TX-37 (1995–present)
- Veronica Escobar, TX-16 (2019–present)
- Sylvia Garcia, TX-29 (2019–present)
- Vicente Gonzalez, TX-34 (2017–present)
- Julie Johnson, TX-32 (2025–present)

State legislators

- James Talarico, HD-50 (2018–present) and nominee for the U.S. Senate

Individuals

- Andrew White, son of former Governor Mark White and former 2026 gubernatorial candidate

Labor unions

- SEIU Texas
- Texas AFL-CIO
- Texas American Federation of Teachers

Organizations

- EMILYs List
- Houston LGBTQ+ Political Caucus

Newspapers

- Austin American-Statesman
- The Austin Chronicle
- The Dallas Morning News
- Fort Worth Star-Telegram
- Houston Chronicle
- San Antonio Express-News

=== Polling ===
Poll source	Date(s) administered	Sample size	Margin of error	Chris Bell	Bobby Cole	Gina Hinojosa	Angela Villescaz	Andrew White	Other	Undecided
YouGov	February 26 – March 2, 2026	2,342 (LV)	± 2.7%	4%	5%	55%	2%	–	9% (Note: "Someone else" with 3%; Patricia Abrego and "I [did/will] not vote in this primary" with 2%; Jose Navarro Balbuena, Faizan Syed, and Zach Vance with 1%; Carlton Hart with 0%)	25%
Blueprint Polling (D)	February 23–24, 2026	472 (LV)	± 4.5%	4%	3%	61%	2%	1%	9% (Note: "Do not remember" with 5%; "Did not vote in this race" with 2%; Patricia Abrego, Carlton Hart, and Zach Vance with 1%; Jose Navarro Balbuena 0%)	20%
UT Tyler	February 13–22, 2026	– (LV)	–	25%	–	60%	–	–	14% (Note: "Someone else" with 14%)	1%
UT Tyler	February 13–22, 2026	– (RV)	–	25%	–	58%	–	–	15% (Note: "Someone else" with 15%)	2%
University of Texas/ Texas Politics Project	February 2–16, 2026	369 (LV)	± 5.9%	4%	9%	76%	3%	–	8% (Note: "Someone else" with 6%; Patricia Abrego and Carlton Hart with 1%; Jose Navarro Balbuena and Zach Vance with 0%)	–
University of Houston/YouGov	January 20–31, 2026	550 (LV)	± 4.2%	7%	6%	37%	4%	–	14% (Note: "2 Others <4%" and Patricia Abrego with 5%; Carlton Hart with 4%)	32%
Slingshot Strategies (D) (Note: Poll sponsored by Texas Public Opinion Research)	January 14–21, 2026	1,290 (LV)	± 3.7%	4%	3%	29%	–	–	6% (Note: "Would not vote in that race" with 5%; Zach Vance with 1%)	58%
	January 5, 2026	White withdraws from the race								
Texas Southern University	December 9–11, 2025	1,600 (LV)	± 2.5%	5%	3%	41%	1%	6%	2% (Note: Jose Navarro Balbuena and "Others (<1%)" with 1%)	42%

=== Results ===
Results by county: Hinojosa—90–100% Hinojosa—80–90% Hinojosa—70–80% Hinojosa—60–70% Hinojosa—50–60% Hinojosa—40–50% Hinojosa—30–40% Hinojosa—20–30% Abrego—60–70% Tie—50% Tie—20–30%

Democratic primary
Party	Candidate	Votes	%
Democratic	Gina Hinojosa	1,289,576	58.5
Democratic	Chris Bell	216,787	9.8
Democratic	Angela "Tia Angie" Villescaz	150,752	6.8
Democratic	Patricia Abrego	128,632	5.8
Democratic	Andrew White (withdrawn)	117,392	5.3
Democratic	Bobby Cole	112,675	5.1
Democratic	Jose Navarro Balbuena	65,826	3.0
Democratic	Carlton W. Hart	63,278	2.9
Democratic	Zach Vance	58,753	2.7
Total votes		2,203,671	100.0

== Third-party and independent candidates ==
=== Candidates ===
==== Declared ====
- Pat Dixon (Libertarian), former chair of the Libertarian Party of Texas and former member of the Lago Vista city council (2005–2010)

===== Write-in =====
- Edward Earl Giles (Independent), veteran
- Jinghpaw Majoishingra (Independent), taxi driver
- Mike Miller (American Solidarity), cybersecurity analyst
- Jenn Mack Raphoon (Independent), project and operations manager

==== Declined ====
- Matthew McConaughey, actor

== General election ==
Hinojosa made public education a major issue in her campaign. She promised that if elected she would fire the Commissioner of the Texas Education Agency Mike Morath, whom Abbott appointed, over a recent surge in state takeover of school districts across the state. She also voiced opposition to the STAAR tests given to students and to the voucher program that Abbott signed into law in 2025. Abbott's campaign did not center education, but did advocate for limiting the use of electronic devices in classrooms, increasing punishments for teacher misconduct, and cutting administrative costs and "unnecessary" mandates. Abbott also proposed banning public schools from sponsoring individuals with H-1B visas.

Affordability was also a major issue of the campaign. Abbott pushed a plan to eliminate the use of local property taxes in public school funding and place limits on appraisal increases. Hinojosa proposed issuing a one-time $1,500 rebate to each Texas household funded by the state's Economic Stablization Fund.

Another focus of the camapign was the development of AI data centers in the state. As of 2026, Texas had one of the highest concentration of data centers in the country with over 300 constructed and the number expected to almost double by 2030. The rapid development of these data centers put strain on the infrastructure of local communities and were becomming increasingly unpopular in the state. Abbott initially welcomed these projects calling Texas "the epicenter of AI development" and stressing the need for the state to be at "the forefront of the AI revolution." Hinojosa called for a moratorium on the construction of data centers in Texas, saying that data centers "are owned by the richest men in the world. We're all footing the bill. There are no rules." She also called for more guardrails on water and electricity use by existing data centers. In the summer of 2026, Abbott pivoted positions and also began advocating new regulations. Such regulations included requiring data centers to pay for their own electric infrastructure and recycle their water usage. Abbott ultimately issued a series of moratoriums on the construction of new data centers pending an audit on their effects on communities. Hinojosa and other crtics of Abbott accused him of flip-flopping and feigning support for regulations as an attempt to secure support in an increasingly close election.

Abbott attacked Hinojosa's voting record from her tenure in the Texas House of Representatives where she was consistently named one of the most progressive members of the body. He accused her of supporting the creation of a state income tax, and highlighted her past statements on culture war issues like supporting transgender athletes in women's sports where he called her "Gender Bending Gina." Hinojosa rejected the characterization that stated that she was not interested in culture war issues and would instead govern with a "populist" and "postpartisan" agenda that "99 percent of us can agree on." Abbott also accused Hinojosa of supporting Islamic extremism and the implementation of Sharia law in Texas. Hinojosa, a practicing Catholic, and independent observers rejected the accusation as a political campaign tactic.

The election marked the first gubernatorial election since 2010 that did not feature a debate between the two major party candidates. Hinojosa called for a debate, but Abbott declined four separate invitations from Texas-based news outlets who offered to host. On October 15, Hinojosa hosted an event where she challenged Abbott to a debate in front of the Texas Governor's Mansion with an empty podium.

On the first day of early voting, Hinojosa announced that she was suing Abbott for allegedly violating the Texas Public Information Act by withholding certain email communications between Abbott and Elon Musk. Abbott had invoked a privacy exception to redact the information describing the contents as "intimate and embarrassing". A State District Judge ruled in Hinojosa's favor on October 26, granting her access to the documents. Abbott appealed the ruling, accusing Hinojosa "abusing her official capacity as an outgoing lawmaker for political purposes." Musk has a history of donating heavily to multiple Republican campaigns, including $5 million towards Abbott's reelection. Musk's relationship with state officials has prompted accusations of favoritism with the allocation of state grants to a variety of Musk's business operations in the state.

=== Predictions ===
Source	Ranking	As of
The Cook Political Report	Lean R	October 29, 2026
Decision Desk HQ	Lean R	November 3, 2026
Fox News	Lean R	November 1, 2026
Inside Elections	Tilt R	October 29, 2026
NBC News	Lean R	November 3, 2026
RealClearPolitics	Tossup	November 1, 2026
Sabato's Crystal Ball	Lean R	November 2, 2026
Silver Bulletin	Lean R	November 3, 2026

=== Post-primary endorsements ===
Gina Hinojosa (D)

Executive branch officials

- Barack Obama, former president of the United States (2009–2017)

U.S. representatives

- Beto O'Rourke, former TX-16 (2013–2019), 2018 U.S. senate nominee and 2022 gubernatorial nominee

Individuals

- Richard Hanania, right-wing political commentator
- Willie Nelson, musician
- Jack Black, musician and actor
- The Chicks, band
- Los Tigres del Norte, band

Labor unions

- American Federation of Government Employees
- United Auto Workers

Organizations

- End Citizens United
- Human Rights Campaign
- Third Act Texas

Newspapers

- Austin American-Statesman
- Houston Chronicle
- San Antonio Express-News
Pat Dixon (L)

U.S. representatives

- Ron Paul, former TX-22 (1976–1977, 1979–1985) and TX-14 (1997–2013) (Republican)
Declined to endorse
- The Dallas Morning News

=== Fundraising ===
Campaign finance reports as of October 24, 2026
Candidate	Raised	Spent	Cash on hand
Greg Abbott (R)	$122,319,463	$317,723,514	$9,361,680
Gina Hinojosa (D)	$39,246,953	$36,911,627	$989,980
Pat Dixon (L)	$22,249	$14,568	$1,064
Source: Texas Ethics Commission

=== Polling ===
Aggregate polls

Source of poll aggregation	Dates administered	Dates updated	Greg Abbott (R)	Gina Hinojosa (D)	Other/ Undecided (Note: Calculated by taking the difference of 100% and all other candidates combined.)	Margin
270toWin	October 13 – November 1, 2026	November 2, 2026	49.3%	47.1%	3.5%	Abbott +2.2%
Decision Desk HQ	through November 1, 2026	November 2, 2026	49.1%	47.5%	3.4%	Abbott +1.6%
FiftyPlusOne	through November 1, 2026	November 2, 2026	48.9%	47.4%	3.7%	Abbott +1.5%
RealClearPolitics	October 15 – November 1, 2026	November 1, 2026	49.8%	47.3%	2.9%	Abbott +2.5%
Silver Bulletin	through November 1, 2026	November 2, 2026	49.4%	47.7%	2.9%	Abbott +1.7%
Average			49.3%	47.4%	3.3%	Abbott +1.9%

Poll source	Date(s) administered	Sample size	Margin of error	Greg Abbott (R)	Gina Hinojosa (D)	Pat Dixon (L)	Other	Undecided
Research Co.	October 31 – November 2, 2026	450 (LV)	± 4.6%	46%	44%	2%	—	8%
Emerson College (Note: Poll sponsored by Poll Vault, a Substack newsletter authored by Sean Trende.)	October 31 – November 1, 2026	500 (LV)	–	50%	49%	1%	–	
HarrisX	October 30 – November 1, 2026	512 (LV)	± 4.3%	51%	46%	—	1% (Note: "Another candidate" with 1%)	2%
AtlasIntel	October 28 – November 1, 2026	1,678 (LV)	± 2.2%	48%	49%	—	2% (Note: "Other" with 1%; "Would not vote" with 1%)	1%
New York Times/Siena University	October 27 – November 1, 2026	1,215 (LV)	± 3.4%	47%	48%	—	0% (Note: "Another candidate" with 0%)	6%
Kreate Strategies	October 27–30, 2026	900 (LV)	± 3.3%	49%	47%	1%	1% (Note: "Another candidate or write-in" with 1%)	3%
YouGov	October 26–29, 2026	2,141 (LV)	± 2.9%	50%	49%	—	2% (Note: "Someone else" with 1%; "Would not vote" with 1%)	0%
Quantus Insights (R)	October 26–28, 2026	1,221 (LV)	± 3.2%	51%	46%	1%	—	2%
SSRS (Note: Poll conducted for CNN)	October 20–27, 2026	923 (LV)	± 4.2%	48%	46%	—	6% (Note: "Neither" with 4%)	0%
Data for Progress (D)	October 23–26, 2026	712 (LV)	± 4.0%	48%	47%	2%	—	4%
YouGov Blue (D) (Note: Poll conducted on behalf of 254 Labs)	October 21–26, 2026	1,000 (RV)	± 4.6%	46%	49%	—	—	—
Texas Southern University	October 21–25, 2026	2,000 (LV)	± 2.2%	50%	47%	2%	—	1%
ActiVote	October 17–21, 2026	400 (LV)	± 4.9%	52%	48%	—	—	—
Univision/YouGov	October 13–21, 2026	1,000 (RV)	± 3.8%	48%	46%	—	1%	5%
Verasight/VoteHub	October 1–20, 2026	509 (LV)	± 4.3%	48% (Note: With voters who lean towards a given candidate)	46%	1%	—	5%
Verasight/VoteHub	October 1–20, 2026	509 (LV)	± 4.3%	46%	44%	2%	—	—
Verasight/VoteHub	October 1–20, 2026	517 (RV)	± 4.3%	48%	45%	1%	—	—
Verasight/VoteHub	October 1–20, 2026	517 (RV)	± 4.3%	46%	42%	5%	—	—
Emerson College	October 17–19, 2026	1,000 (LV)	± 3.0%	49%	45%	1%	—	4%
Beacon Research (D)/ Shaw & Co. Research (R) (Note: Poll conducted for Fox News)	October 15–19, 2026	2,011 (RV)	± 2.0%	50%	49%	—	—	1%
Beacon Research (D)/ Shaw & Co. Research (R)	October 15–19, 2026	1,398 (LV)	± 2.5%	52%	47%	—	—	1%
Texas Public Opinion Research	October 15–18, 2026	969 (LV)	± 3.9%	51%	48%	1%	—	—
Pollfinity Research	October 15–18, 2026	278 (RV)	± 6.5%	46%	45%	2%	2% (Note: "Someone else" with 2%)	5%
CBS News/YouGov	October 8–16, 2026	1,492 (LV)	± 3.5%	52%	48%	—	—	—
University of Houston	October 10–14, 2026	2,000 (LV)	± 2.2%	49%	46%	2%	—	3%
ActiVote	September 30 – October 14, 2026	400 (LV)	± 4.9%	51%	49%	—	—	—
GS Strategy Group (R)/New River Strategies (D) (Note: Poll sponsored by The Cook Political Report.)	October 9–13, 2026	934 (LV)	—	48%	46%	3%	—	3%
Marist University	October 8–11, 2026	— (LV)	± 4.9%	49%	45%	—	2% (Note: "Another party's candidate" with 1%; "No response" with 1%)	3%
Marist University	October 8–11, 2026	1,196 (RV)	± 4.3%	48%	47%	—	2%	3%
GBAO (D) (Note: Poll sponsored by Hinojosa's campaign)	October 5–8, 2026	800 (LV)	± 3.5%	45%	47%	4%	—	4%
ReconMR/Siena University	October 5–8, 2026	617 (LV)	± 4.4%	48%	47%	—	2%	3%
YouGov	September 28 – October 5, 2026	3,625 (LV)	± 3.0%	47%	48%	—	1%	5%
University of Texas/Texas Politics Project	September 25 – October 5, 2026	861 (LV)	± 3.3%	48%	49%	1%	2%	—
New York Times/Siena University	September 22 – October 1, 2026	615 (LV)	± 2.1%	46%	49%	—	—	5%
Beacon Research (D)/ Shaw & Co. Research (R)	September 24–28, 2026	1,005 (LV)	± 3.0%	52%	47%	—	—	1%
Beacon Research (D)/ Shaw & Co. Research (R)	September 24–28, 2026	1,203 (RV)	± 2.5%	50%	49%	—	—	1%
Guidant Polling & Strategy (Note: Poll sponsored by Public First Action)	September 20–28, 2026	800 (LV)	± 3.5%	46%	44%	4%	—	5%
UMass Lowell/YouGov	September 18–28, 2026	850 (LV)	± 4.5%	48%	44%	1%	1% (Note: "Will not vote" with 1%)	6%
Big Data Poll	September 24–26, 2026	698 (LV)	± 4.0%	49%	44%	6%	—	—
Big Data Poll	September 24–26, 2026	698 (LV)	± 4.0%	47%	44%	4%	—	5%
Big Data Poll	September 24–26, 2026	793 (RV)	± 4.0%	48%	44%	8%	—	—
Big Data Poll	September 24–26, 2026	793 (RV)	± 4.0%	46%	43%	4%	—	7%
Stratus Intelligence (R)	September 22–24, 2026	865 (LV)	± 3.5%	50%	45%	—	—	5%
Texas Public Opinion Research	September 19–22, 2026	1,007 (LV)	± 3.6%	50%	46%	2%	1% (Note: "Would not vote in this race" with 1%)	2%
Marist University	September 17–20, 2026	1,139 (RV)	± 4.4%	46%	49%	—	1%	3%
Texas Southern University	September 15–19, 2026	1,800 (LV)	± 2.3%	49%	45%	2%	—	4%
Emerson College	September 12–14, 2026	1,000 (LV)	± 3.0%	49%	46%	2%	—	4%
SoCal Strategies (R)	September 12–13, 2026	649 (LV)	—	52%	44%	—	—	3%
ReconMR/Siena University	September 8–11, 2026	614 (LV)	± 4.3%	45%	49%	—	2%	4%
Mason-Dixon	September 8–10, 2026	625 (LV)	± 4.0%	48%	41%	1%	2% (Note: Jenn Mack Raphoon (I) with 2%)	8%
Univision/YouGov	August 27 – September 4, 2026	1,000 (RV)	± 3.6%	47%	47%	—	1%	5%
Fabrizio Ward (R)/ Impact Research (D) (Note: Poll commissioned by AARP)	August 30 – September 1, 2026	895 (LV)	± 3.3%	49%	46%	—	—	5%
Overton Insights (R) (Note: Poll sponsored by Texas Public Policy Foundation)	August 24–26, 2026	1,167 (LV)	± 2.9%	51%	49%	—	—	—
Overton Insights (R)	August 24–26, 2026	1,167 (LV)	± 2.9%	47%	46%	—	—	7%
Texas Public Opinion Research	August 21–24, 2026	1,000 (LV)	± 3.3%	49% (Note: With voters who lean towards a given candidate)	42%	1%	2% (Note: Jenn Mack Raphoon (I) with 1%; "Would not vote in that race" with 1%)	6%
University of Texas/Texas Politics Project	August 5–13, 2026	1,200 (RV)	± 2.83%	45%	40%	3%	2% (Note: "Someone else" with 2%)	10%
Emerson College (Note: Poll sponsored by Nexstar Media)	August 9–10, 2026	1,000 (LV)	± 3.0%	49%	45%	—	3% (Note: "Someone else" with 3%)	4%
GBAO (D)	August 4–9, 2026	1,000 (LV)	± 3.1%	49%	48%	—	—	3%
Cygnal (R)	July 29–31, 2026	800 (LV)	± 3.5%	49%	46%	—	—	5%
Texas A&M University/ReconMR/Siena University	July 27–30, 2026	619 (LV)	± 4.7%	46%	45%	—	4%	5%
Texas Southern University	July 27–30, 2026	1,200 (LV)	± 2.8%	49%	43%	3%	—	5%
Beacon Research (D)/ Shaw & Co. Research (R)	July 23–27, 2026	1,005 (RV)	± 3.0%	50%	49%	—	—	1%
Texas Public Opinion Research	July 15–17, 2026	1,048 (LV)	± 3.4%	45%	42%	—	—	13%
New York Times/Siena University	June 19–27, 2026	656 (LV)	± 4.5%	51%	44%	—	—	5%
SoCal Strategies(R) (Note: Poll sponsored by Red Eagle Politics, a conservative online content creator)	June 21, 2026	800 (LV)	—	54%	42%	—	—	4%
University of Texas/Texas Politics Project	June 5–12, 2026	1,200 (RV)	± 2.8%	47%	40%	1%	2% (Note: "Someone else" with 2%)	10%
Quantus Insights (R)	June 3–4, 2026	800 (LV)	± 3.5%	49%	41%	—	3%	7%
Texas A&M University/ReconMR	June 1–4, 2026	807 (LV)	± 4%	49%	43%	—	3% (Note: "Someone else" with 2%; "Wouldn't vote" with 1%)	5%
Texas Public Opinion Research	May 27–28, 2026	1,670 (LV)	± 2.8%	46%	41%	1%	2% (Note: Jenn Mack Raphoon (I) with 1%; "Would not vote in that race" with 1%)	9%
Public Policy Polling (D) (Note: Poll commissioned by Lone Star Rising PAC, which supports James Talarico's campaign for U.S. Senate.)	May 22–23, 2026	643 (RV)	—	48%	44%	—	—	8%
Texas Southern University/YouGov	April 22 – May 5, 2026	1,223 (LV)	± 2.8%	49%	43%	3%	—	5%
Slingshot Strategies (D)	April 17–20, 2026	1,018 (LV)	± 3.3%	48%	43%	—	2% (Note: "Would not vote in that race" with 2%)	7%
University of Texas/Texas Politics Project	April 10–20, 2026	1,200 (RV)	± 2.8%	44%	38%	—	5% (Note: "Someone else" with 5%)	13%
UT Tyler	February 13–22, 2026	1,117 (RV)	± 3.1%	49%	41%	—	—	10%
University of Texas/Texas Politics Project	February 2–16, 2026	1,300 (RV)	± 5.1%	45%	35%	—	6% (Note: "Someone else" with 6%)	14%
GBAO (D)	January 26 – February 3, 2026	1,000 (LV)	± 3.1%	46%	43%	6%	—	5%
University of Houston/YouGov	January 20–31, 2026	1,502 (LV)	± 2.5%	49%	42%	3%	—	6%
Emerson College	January 10–12, 2026	1,165 (RV)	± 2.8%	50%	42%	—	—	8%

Hypothetical polling

Greg Abbott vs. Chris Bell

Poll source	Date(s) administered	Sample size	Margin of error	Greg Abbott (R)	Chris Bell (D)	Undecided
UT Tyler	February 13–22, 2026	1,117 (RV)	± 3.1%	51%	39%	10%

Generic Republican vs. generic Democrat

Poll source	Date(s) administered	Sample size	Margin of error	Generic Republican	Generic Democrat	Other	Undecided
Texas Public Opinion Research	August 27–29, 2025	843 (RV)	± 4.6%	49%	43%	8% (Note: "Someone else" with 8%)	–

=== Results ===
2026 Texas gubernatorial election
Party	Candidate	Votes	%	±%
Democratic	Gina Hinojosa	5,232,690	52.82	▲8.96
Republican	Greg Abbott (incumbent)	4,525,990	45.68	▼9.08
Libertarian	Pat Dixon	148,140	1.50	▲0.49
Write-in		3,987	0.0	
Total votes		9,910,807	100.0	
Democratic gain from Republican				

Counties that flipped from Republican to Democratic

- Bastrop (largest municipality: Elgin)
- Brazoria (largest municipality: Pearland)
- Brazos (largest municipality: College Station)
- Brewster (largest municipality: Alpine)
- Caldwell (largest municipality: Lockhart)
- Collin (largest municipality: Plano)
- Culberson (largest municipality: Van Horn)
- Denton (largest municipality: Denton)
- Frio (largest municipality: Pearsall)
- Jefferson (largest municipality: Beaumont)
- Jim Wells (largest municipality: Alice)
- Kleberg (largest municipality: Kingsville)
- La Salle (largest municipality: Cotulla)
- Nueces (largest municipality: Corpus Christi)
- Tarrant (largest municipality: Fort Worth)
- Val Verde (largest municipality: Del Rio)
- Zapata (largest municipality: Zapata)

=== By congressional district ===
Despite losing statewide, Abbott won 24 out of 38 congressional districts.

District	Abbott	Hinojosa	Elected representative
1st	66%	32%	Nathaniel Moran
2nd	50%	48%	Steve Toth
3rd	52%	47%	Keith Self
4th	55%	43%	Pat Fallon
5th	50%	49%	Lance Gooden
6th	50%	49%	Jake Ellzey
7th	28%	70%	Lizzie Fletcher
8th	52%	47%	Jessica Steinmann
9th	41%	58%	Leticia Gutierrez
10th	53%	46%	Chris Gober
11th	56%	42%	August Pfluger
12th	50%	48%	Craig Goldman
13th	63%	35%	Ronny Jackson
14th	51%	47%	Randy Weber
15th	40%	59%	Bobby Pulido
16th	28%	70%	Veronica Escobar
17th	51%	47%	Pete Sessions
18th	14%	84%	Christian Menefee
19th	66%	32%	Tom Sell
20th	22%	75%	Joaquin Castro
21st	53%	46%	Mark Teixeira
22nd	49%	48%	Trever Nehls
23rd	45%	54%	Katy Padilla Stout
24th	52%	47%	Beth Van Duyne
25th	51%	47%	Roger Williams
26th	54%	45%	Brandon Gill
27th	50%	49%	Michael Cloud
28th	33%	66%	Henry Cuellar
29th	20%	78%	Sylvia Garcia
30th	18%	81%	Frederick Haynes III
31st	52%	46%	John Carter
32nd	50%	48%	Jace Yarbrough
33rd	22%	77%	Colin Allred
34th	39%	59%	Vicente Gonzalez
35th	43%	55%	Johnny Garcia
36th	52%	47%	Brian Babin
37th	15%	84%	Greg Casar
38th	51%	48%	Jon Bonck

== Analysis ==
=== Exit poll ===
2026 Texas gubernatorial election (CNN)
Demographic subgroup	Hinojosa	Abbott	% of total vote
Ideology
Liberals	97	2	22
Moderates	67	31	40
Conservatives	13	86	38
Party
Democrats	98	2	33
Republicans	9	90	38
Independents	59	38	29
Donald Trump job approval
Approve	4	95	40
Disapprove	86	12	59
2024 presidential vote
Kamala Harris	96	3	42
Donald Trump	10	89	47
Another candidate	66	21	2
Did not vote	76	20	8
Gender
Men	49	50	45
Women	56	43	54
Income
$100,000 or more	51	48	40
$50,000-$99,999	53	45	30
Less than $50,000	56	42	30
Race/ethnicity
White	40	59	55
Asian	66	34	4
Latino	65	33	24
Black	88	10	12
White born-again or evangelical Christian?
Yes	16	83	20
No	62	36	80
Race by gender
White men	38	61	26
White women	42	57	29
Black men	85	12	5
Black women	90	9	7
Latino men	59	40	11
Latina women	70	28	13
All other voters	55	44	9
Age
18–29 years old	77	21	13
30–44 years old	62	36	22
45-64 years old	47	51	35
65 and older	42	57	30
Area type
Urban	71	28	23
Suburban	56	43	48
Rural	34	64	30
Education
College graduate	58	41	45
No college degree	49	50	55
Education by race
White college graduates	51	48	28
Non-white college graduates	70	29	18
Whites without college	30	68	28
Non-whites without college	68	30	27
Education by gender and race
White women with college degrees	53	46	14
White women without college degrees	31	67	15
White men with college degrees	48	51	13
White men without college degrees	27	71	13
Voters of color	69	30	45
Educational attainment
Advanced degree	62	37	18
Bachelor's degree	56	43	27
Associate's degree	50	48	12
Some college	47	52	21
Never attended college	49	49	22

== See also ==
- 2026 United States gubernatorial elections
- 2026 Texas elections

== Notes ==
Partisan clients
