= Benjamín Flores =

Benjamin Flores or Benjamín Flores may refer to:

- Benjamin Flores Jr. (born 2002), American actor and rapper
- Benjamín Flores (Mexican boxer) (1984–2009), Mexican professional boxer
- Benjamin Flores (politician), Mexican-born American politician
- Leonel Flores, born Leonel Benjamín Flores (born 2007), Argentine professional footballer
- BJ Flores, born Benjamin Flores (born 1979), American professional boxer
