= 2022 Texas Land Commissioner election =

- November 8, 2022
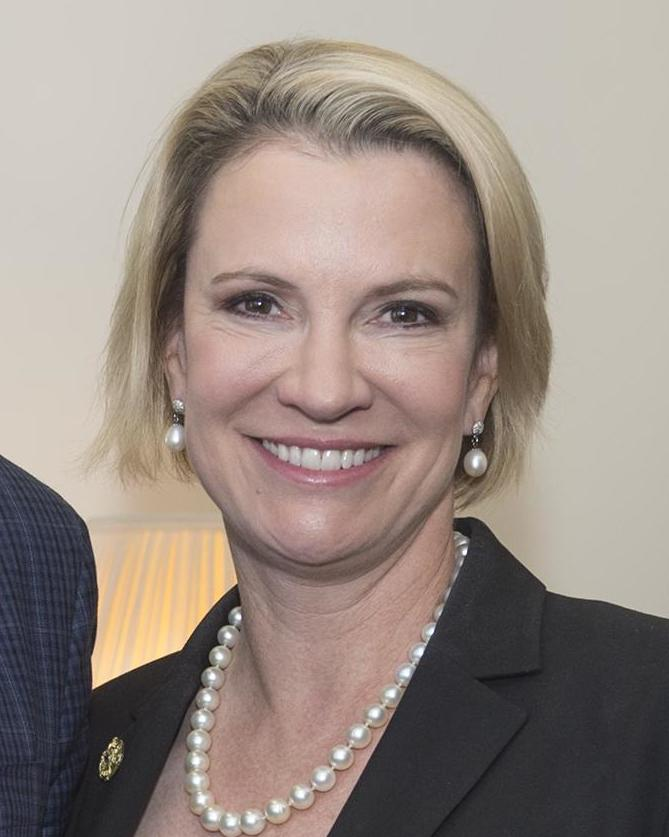

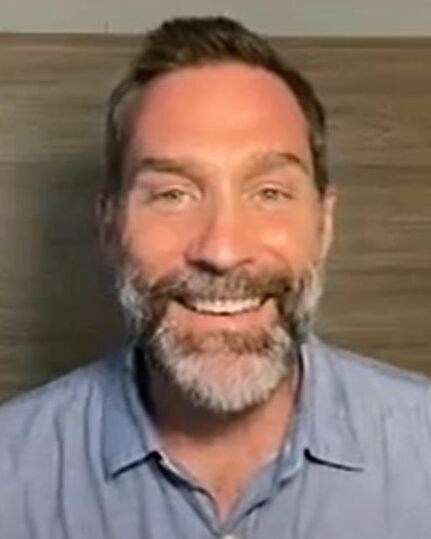
Nominee	Dawn Buckingham	Jay Kleberg
Party	Republican	Democratic
Popular vote	4,463,452	3,350,291
Percentage	56.2%	42.2%
- Buckingham: 40–50% 50–60% 60–70% 70–80% 80–90% >90% Kleberg: 40–50% 50–60% 60–70% 70–80% 80–90% >90% Tie: 40–50% 50% No votes
Land Commissioner before election
George P. Bush
Republican
Elected Land Commissioner
Dawn Buckingham
Republican

The 2022 Texas Land Commissioner election took place on November 8, 2022, to elect the Texas General Land Office Commissioner. Incumbent Republican Land Commissioner George P. Bush retired to run for attorney general. He had been re-elected in 2018 with 53.7% of the vote. Bush was replaced by fellow Republican Dawn Buckingham, who won with 56.2% of the vote against Democratic nominee Jay Kleberg. With her victory Buckingham became the first woman in Texas history to serve as Land Commissioner.

== Republican primary ==
=== Candidates ===
Nominee

- Dawn Buckingham, state senator from the 24th district

Eliminated in runoff

- Tim Westley, pastor

Eliminated in primary

- Ben Armenta, businessman
- Victor Avila, former U.S. Immigration and Customs Enforcement agent
- Rufus Lopez, attorney
- Weston Martinez, activist and former Texas Real Estate Commissioner
- Don W. Minton, attorney
- Jon Spiers, surgeon and candidate for Texas's 2nd congressional district in 2018

=== Endorsements ===
Dawn Buckingham

U.S. Executive Branch officials

- Donald Trump, 45th president of the United States (2017–2021)

Statewide officials

- Greg Abbott, Governor of Texas (2015–present)
- Dan Patrick, Lieutenant Governor of Texas (2015–present) and former state senator from the 7th district (2007–2015)

State legislators

- Paul Bettencourt, state senator from the 7th district (2015–present) and Senate Majority Leader (2016–present)
- Brian Birdwell, state senator from the 22nd district (2010–present)
- Donna Campbell, state senator from the 25th district (2013–present) and President pro tempore of the Senate (2021–present)
- Brandon Creighton, state senator from the 4th district (2014–present) and former state representative from the 16th district (2007–2014)
- Bob Hall, state senator from the 2nd district (2015–present)
- Joan Huffman, state senator from the 17th district (2008–present)
- Bryan Hughes, state senator from the 1st district (2017–present) and former state representative from the 5th district (2003–2017)
- Lois Kolkhorst, state senator from the 18th district (2014–present) and former state representative from the 13th district (2001–2014)
- Robert Nichols, state senator from the 3rd district (2007–present) and former mayor of Jacksonville (1985–1989)
- Angela Paxton, state senator from the 8th district (2019–present)
- Charles Perry, state senator from the 28th district (2014–present) and former state representative from the 83rd district (2011–2014)
- Charles Schwertner, state senator from the 5th district (2013–present) and former state representative from the 20th district (2011–2013)
- Drew Springer, state senator from the 30th district (2021–present) and former state representative from the 68th district (2013–2021)
- Larry Taylor, state senator from the 11th district (2013–present) and former state representative from the 24th district (2003–2013)

Newspapers and other media

- San Antonio Express-News (dual endorsement with Kleberg)

Organizations

- Texas Alliance for Life
- Texas Home School Coalition
- Texas Oil and Gas Association

=== First round ===
==== Polling ====
Poll source	Date(s) administered	Sample size (Note: Key: A – all adults RV – registered voters LV – likely voters V – unclear)	Margin of error	Ben Armenta	Victor Avila	Dawn Buckingham	Rufus Lopez	Weston Martinez	Don W. Minton	Jon Spiers	Tim Westley	Undecided
YouGov/UH	January 14–24, 2022	490 (LV)	± 3.7%	0%	4%	4%	3%	3%	1%	3%	2%	80%

==== Results ====
Republican primary results
Party	Candidate	Votes	%
Republican	Dawn Buckingham	679,125	41.92%
Republican	Tim Westley	239,473	14.78%
Republican	Jon Spiers	203,879	12.58%
Republican	Don W. Minton	171,001	10.55%
Republican	Victor Avila	121,998	7.53%
Republican	Weston Martinez	107,219	6.62%
Republican	Rufus Lopez	49,475	3.05%
Republican	Ben Armenta	48,029	2.96%
Total votes		1,620,199	100.0%

=== Runoff ===
==== Polling ====
Poll source	Date(s) administered	Sample size	Margin of error	Dawn Buckingham	Tim Westley	Undecided
CWS Research (R) (Note: Poll sponsored by Defend Texas Liberty PAC)	May 4–10, 2022	992 (LV)	± 3.1%	34%	18%	48%
CWS Research (R)	March 29 – April 2, 2022	678 (LV)	± 3.8%	42%	18%	40%

==== Results ====
Republican primary runoff results
Party	Candidate	Votes	%
Republican	Dawn Buckingham	595,554	68.78%
Republican	Tim Westley	270,365	31.22%
Total votes		865,919	100.0%

== Democratic primary ==
=== Candidates ===
Nominee

- Jay Kleberg, conservationist and member of the King Ranch family

Eliminated in runoff

- Sandagrace Martinez, mental health advocate

Eliminated in primary

- Jinny Suh, lawyer and activist
- Michael Lange

=== Endorsements ===
Jay Kleberg

Statewide officials

- Garry Mauro, former Commissioner of the Texas General Land Office

State legislators

- Terry Canales, state representative from the 40th district
- Alex Dominguez, state representative from the 37th district
- Robert Guerra, state representative from the 41st district
- Michael Lange, investment manager
- Oscar Longoria, state representative from the 35th district
- Eddie Lucio III, former state representative from the 38th district
- Armando Martinez, state representative from the 39th district

Newspaper and other media

- The Austin Chronicle

Labor unions

- Texas AFL–CIO
- Texas Federation of Teachers

Organizations

- Planned Parenthood Texas Votes
Jinny Suh

State legislators

- Donna Howard, state representative from the 48th district
- Gene Wu, state representative from the 137th district
- Erin Zwiener, state representative from the 45th district

Organizations

- AFL–CIO
- American Federation of Teachers
- Annie's List

=== First round ===
==== Polling ====
Poll source	Date(s) administered	Sample size	Margin of error	Jay Kleberg	Michael Lange	Sandagrace Martinez	Jinny Suh	Undecided
YouGov/UH	January 14–24, 2022	616 (LV)	± 3.3%	7%	8%	17%	4%	64%

==== Results ====
Democratic primary results
Party	Candidate	Votes	%
Democratic	Sandragrace Martinez	313,780	31.80%
Democratic	Jay Kleberg	257,034	26.05%
Democratic	Jinny Suh	216,238	21.91%
Democratic	Michael Lange	199,764	20.24%
Total votes		986,816	100.0%

=== Runoff ===
==== Results ====
Democratic primary runoff results
Party	Candidate	Votes	%
Democratic	Jay Kleberg	254,273	52.95%
Democratic	Sandragrace Martinez	225,964	47.05%
Total votes		480,237	100.0%

== General election ==
=== Polling ===
Poll source	Date(s) administered	Sample size	Margin of error	Dawn Buckingham (R)	Jay Kleberg (D)	Other	Undecided
Texas Hispanic Policy Foundation	September 6–15, 2022	1,172 (LV)	± 2.9%	46%	38%	2% (Note: Molison with 2%)	14%

=== Results ===
2022 Texas Land Commissioner election
Party	Candidate	Votes	%	±%
Republican	Dawn Buckingham	4,463,452	56.15%	+2.47%
Democratic	Jay Kleberg	3,350,291	42.15%	−1.04%
Green	Alfred Molison Jr.	133,034	1.67%	N/A
Total votes		7,948,589	100.0%	
Republican hold				

== Notes ==
Partisan clients
