= 2026 Texas Land Commissioner election =

- November 3, 2026

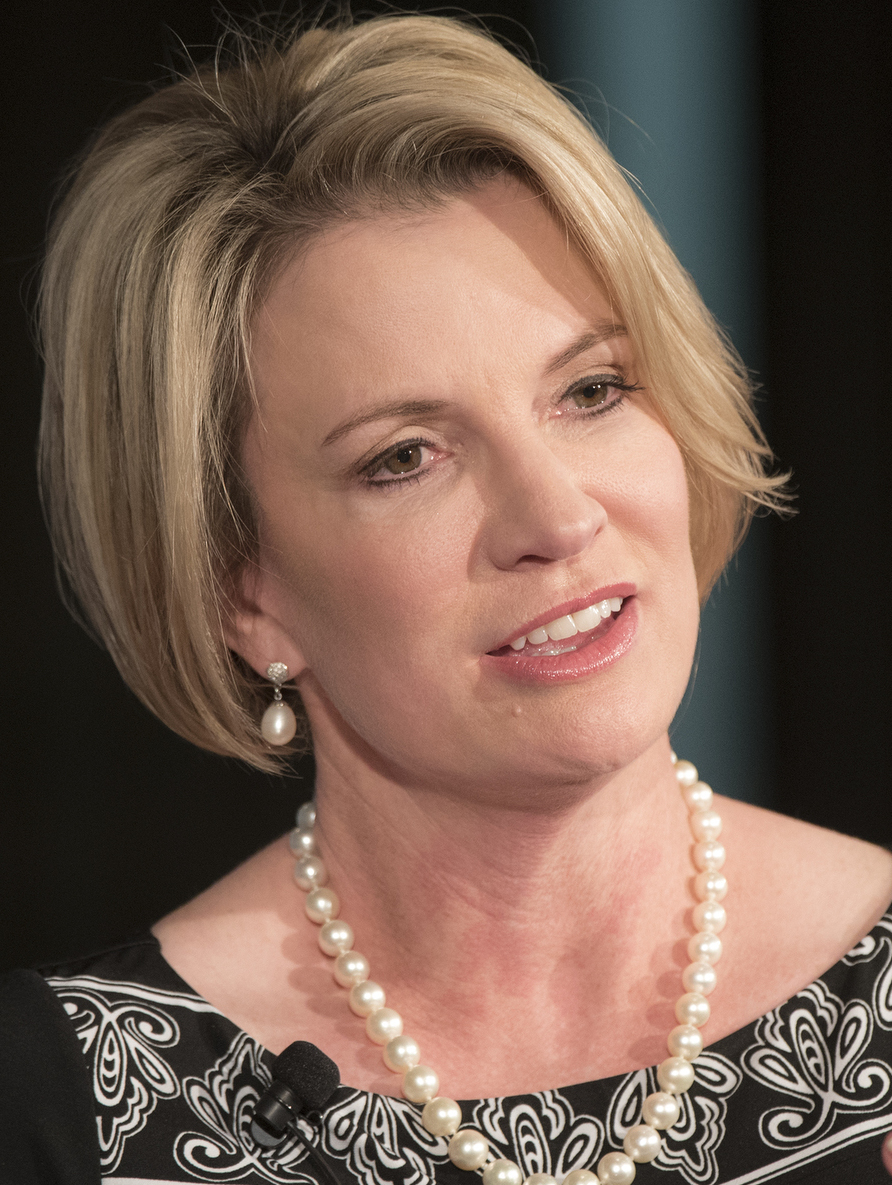
Nominee	Benjamin Flores	Dawn Buckingham
Party	Democratic	Republican
Popular vote	5,016,672	4,578,315
Percentage	51.5%	47.0%
- County results Flores: 50–60% 60–70% 70–80% Buckingham: 40–50% 50–60% 60–70% 70–80% 80–90% ≥90%
Land Commissioner before election
Dawn Buckingham
Republican
Elected Land Commissioner
Benjamin Flores
Democratic

The 2026 Texas Land Commissioner election took place on November 3, 2026, to select the next Texas General Land Office Commissioner. Incumbent Republican Land Commissioner Dawn Buckingham was defeated for re-election to a second four-year term by Democrat Benjamin Flores as part of a larger statewide upset of Republicans. Buckingham had previously been elected in 2022 with 56.2% of the vote. Flores became the first Democrat to win the office since 1994.

Primary elections were held on March 3, 2026. Buckingham was nominated unopposed. Flores, a city councilor from Bay City who had previously been a candidate in the gubernatorial race, defeated Jose Loya in the Democratic primary.

== Republican primary ==
=== Candidates ===
Nominee

- Dawn Buckingham, incumbent land commissioner

=== Endorsements ===
Dawn Buckingham

Executive branch officials

- Donald Trump, president of the United States (2017–2021, 2025–present)

Statewide officials

- Wayne Christian, railroad commissioner of Texas (2017–present)
- Jim Wright, railroad commissioner of Texas (2021–present)

State legislators

- Dustin Burrows, Speaker of the Texas House of Representatives (2025–present) from HD-83 (2015–present)
- Tan Parker, SD-12 (2023–present) and Majority Leader of the Texas Senate (2025–present)
- Angela Paxton, SD-08 (2019–present) and former Majority Leader of the Texas Senate (2023–2025)
- Charles Schwertner, SD-05 (2013–present) and former President Pro Tempore of the Texas Senate (2023–2025)

Labor unions

- National Border Patrol Council

Organizations

- Texas and Southwestern Cattle Raisers Association
- Texas Oil and Gas Association

=== Results ===
Republican primary
Party	Candidate	Votes	%
Republican	Dawn Buckingham (incumbent)	1,755,606	100.0
Total votes		1,755,606	100.0

== Democratic primary ==
=== Candidates ===
Nominee

- Benjamin Flores, Bay City councilor (previously ran for governor)

Eliminated in primary

- Jose Loya, marine veteran and oil refinery union leader

=== Endorsements ===
Jose Loya

U.S. representatives

- Ro Khanna, CA-17 (2017–present)

Labor unions

- Texas AFL-CIO

=== Results ===
Results by county Flores: 50–60%; 60–70%; 70–80%; Loya: 50–60%; 60–70%; 70–80%; 80–90%; 90–100%

Democratic primary
Party	Candidate	Votes	%
Democratic	Benjamin Flores	1,125,716	55.6
Democratic	Jose Loya	900,228	44.4
Total votes		2,025,944	100.0

== Third-party and independent candidates ==
=== Candidates ===
==== Declared ====
- Neill Snider (Libertarian), mechanical contractor and cattle rancher

== General election ==
On June 12, 2026, Benjamin Flores announced that he had been diagnosed with leukemia. His campaign announced that Flores would not be on the campaign trail for a couple of months to focus on his health, but that he would remain on the ballot as an active candidate.

=== Post-primary endorsements ===
Dawn Buckingham (R)

Newspapers

- Austin American-Statesman
- The Dallas Morning News
Benjamin Flores (D)

State legislators

- Josey Garcia, HD-124 (2023–present)
- Eddie Morales, HD-74 (2021–present)
- Gene Wu, HD-137 (2017–present) and minority leader of the Texas House of Representatives (2025–present)

Organizations

- Texas AFL-CIO

Newspapers

- San Antonio Express-News

=== Fundraising ===
Campaign finance reports as of October 24, 2026
Candidate	Raised	Spent	Cash on hand
Dawn Buckingham (R)	$1,990,379	$961,090	$3,730,275
Benjamin Flores (D)	$57,194	$102,122	$20,080
Neill Snider (L)	$1,185	$1,188	$0
Source: Texas Ethics Commission

=== Polling ===
Poll source	Date(s) administered	Sample size (Note: Key: A – all adults RV – registered voters LV – likely voters V – unclear)	Margin of error	Dawn Buckingham (R)	Benjamin Flores (D)	Other	Undecided
Texas Public Opinion Research	October 15–18, 2026	969 (LV)	± 3.9%	49%	48%	3% (Note: Neil Snider (L) with 3%)	–
University of Houston	October 10–14, 2026	2,000 (LV)	± 2.2%	47%	40%	2% (Note: Neill Snider (L) with 2%)	11%
Texas Public Opinion Research	September 19–22, 2026	1,007 (LV)	± 3.6%	46%	43%	3% (Note: "Would not vote" with 2%; Neil Snider (L) with 1%)	7%
Texas Southern University	September 15–19, 2026	1,800 (LV)	± 2.3%	47%	39%	2% (Note: Neill Snider (L) with 2%)	12%
Texas Public Opinion Research	August 21–24, 2026	1,000 (LV)	± 3.3%	44% (Note: With voters who lean towards a given candidate)	40%	5% (Note: "Would not vote in that race" with 3%; Neil Snider (L) with 2%)	10%
Texas Southern University	July 27–30, 2026	1,200 (LV)	± 2.8%	45%	40%	2% (Note: Neill Snider (L) with 2%)	13%

=== Results ===
2026 Texas Land Commissioner election
Party	Candidate	Votes	%	±%
Democratic	Benjamin Flores	5,016,672	51.5	
Republican	Dawn Buckingham (incumbent)	4,578,315	47.0	
Libertarian	Neill Snider	155,467	1.6	
Total votes		9,750,454	100.0%	
Democratic gain from Republican				

== See also ==
- 2026 Texas elections
