= Jerry E. Patterson =

American politician (born 1946)

Jerry Patterson
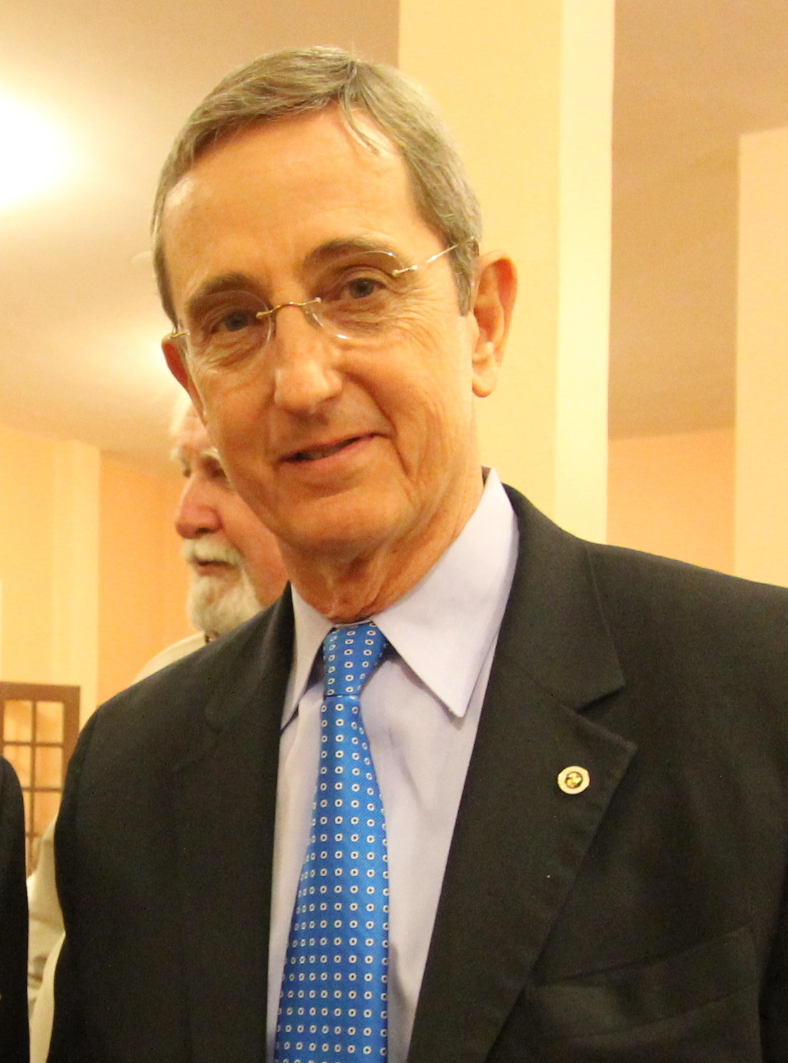
- Patterson in 2013

27th Land Commissioner of Texas
- In office January 21, 2003 – January 2, 2015
- Governor: Rick Perry
- Preceded by: David Dewhurst
- Succeeded by: George P. Bush

Member of the Texas Senate from the 11th district
- In office January 12, 1993 – January 12, 1999
- Preceded by: Chet Brooks
- Succeeded by: Mike Jackson

Personal details
- Born: Jerry Emmett Patterson; November 15, 1946 (age 79) Houston, Texas, U.S.
- Party: Republican
- Children: 4
- Education: Texas A&M University (BA)

Military service
- Branch/service: United States Marine Corps
- Years of service: 1971–1993
- Rank: Lieutenant Colonel
- Battles/wars: Vietnam War

Jerry Emmett Patterson (born November 15, 1946) is an American politician who served as the commissioner of the Texas General Land Office from 2003 to 2015. A former state senator, he was the second Republican since Reconstruction to serve as land commissioner, a post which he held for three terms. He served from the Houston area in District 11 in the Texas Senate from 1993 to 1999.

Patterson did not immediately seek a fourth term as land commissioner. He was instead an unsuccessful Republican candidate for Lieutenant Governor of Texas in the primary election held on March 4, 2014, losing to Dan Patrick. In 2018, he ran again for land commissioner, losing to incumbent George P. Bush in the Republican primary.

== Early life and education ==
Patterson was born to Jerry Patterson and the former Georgia Lee Scheaffer in Houston. He graduated from Texas A&M University in 1969 with a Bachelor of Arts degree in history.

== Career ==
In 1972, he volunteered for duty in Vietnam. He was later designated a naval flight officer in Pensacola, Florida, and he served in Marine fighter squadrons until his retirement from the Marine Corps Reserve as a Lieutenant Colonel in 1993.

In 1984, Patterson ran for Texas' 25th congressional district. He faced freshman Democratic Representative Michael A. Andrews and lost, 64 to 36 percent.

In 1992, Patterson won election to the Texas Senate, serving from 1993 to 1999. During his tenure, he introduced a successful bill to allow concealed carry of firearms. A 2012 New York Times article described Patterson regularly wearing a gun on his ankle and a second in the small of his back.

In March 1998, Patterson lost the Republican primary for land commissioner to David Dewhurst, also from Houston. Dewhurst led with 265,363 votes (51.2 percent). Patterson trailed with 216,250 votes (41.7 percent), and a third candidate, Don Loucks, held the remaining 36,706 votes (7.1 percent).

In the 2002 Republican primary for Texas land commissioner, Patterson defeated Kenn George of Dallas, a member of the Texas House of Representatives from District 108 and an assistant United States Secretary of Commerce in the administration of U.S. President Ronald W. Reagan. In the general election, Patterson was opposed by Democratic State Senator David Bernsen of Beaumont. Patterson defeated him with 53.2% of the vote to Bernsen's 41.5%. In April 2003, Patterson was sworn into office, succeeding his one-time primary rival David Dewhurst; Dewhurst had left office to successfully run for Lieutenant Governor of Texas.

In 2010, Patterson entered into a highly public dispute with Texas State Representative Wayne Christian over an amendment Christian had introduced to rebuild his vacation home after Hurricane Ike. Patterson threatened to force the legislature to impeach him before he would enforce the provision, telling the Houston Chronicle, "My option is just to say, 'Screw you, Wayne Christian,' because the Legislature didn't pass this, one guy passed this."

=== Race for lieutenant governor ===
In July 2011, Patterson announced that he would run for lieutenant governor in 2014. Patterson in 2012 endorsed three-term incumbent Lieutenant Governor David Dewhurst, who ran for the United States Senate. However, Dewhurst was defeated by former Texas Solicitor General Ted Cruz in the Republican primary runoff election on July 31, 2012.

In his race for lieutenant governor, Patterson polled 165,787 votes (12.5 percent) and ran last among the four candidates. After his last place finish, Patterson dumped a ton of opposition research on Patrick to the media, including medical records.

=== Later campaigns ===
Patterson said that even had he won, the 2014 race would have been his last campaign because he is "more concerned about the next generation [than] ... about the next election."

In 2015, he considered but decided against a run for an open seat on the Texas Railroad Commission, citing the likely electoral backlash against his personal opposition to Republican presidential frontrunner, Donald Trump.

In 2018, he ran for another term in his previous position, Texas Commissioner of the General Land Office. He opposed incumbent George P. Bush, a grandson of President George H. W. Bush, in the Republican primary. Patterson charged that Bush's agency had repaired only two homes in the months following Hurricane Harvey and criticized his plan to renovate the Alamo historic site. Politifact rated Patterson's criticism of Bush's Hurricane Harvey recovery efforts as "Mostly True" but an "oversimplification." Bush outraised Patterson significantly, with more than $1.5 million in campaign contributions to Patterson's $107,000. Bush defeated Patterson and two other candidates in the March 6, 2018 primary. Bush received 58.2% of the vote to Patterson's 29.7%, avoiding a run-off.

== Electoral history ==
2018 Texas General Land Commissioner Republican Primary Election
Party	Candidate	Votes	%
Republican	George P. Bush (Incumbent)	859,209	58.2
Republican	Jerry Patterson	438,346	29.7
Republican	Davey Edwards	101,074	6.8
Republican	Rick Range	77,936	5.3

2014 Texas Lieutenant Governor Republican Primary Election
Party	Candidate	Votes	%
Republican	Dan Patrick	550,769	41.45
Republican	David Dewhurst (Incumbent)	376,196	28.31
Republican	Todd Staples	235,981	17.75
Republican	Jerry Patterson	165,787	12.47

2010 Texas General Land Commissioner General Election
Party	Candidate	Votes	%
Republican	Jerry Patterson (Incumbent)	3,001,736	61.7
Democratic	Hector Uribe	1,717,518	35.3
Libertarian	James Holdar	148,271	3

2006 Texas General Land Commissioner General Election
Party	Candidate	Votes	%
Republican	Jerry Patterson (Incumbent)	2,317,554	55.1
Democratic	VaLinda Hathcox	1,721,964	41
Libertarian	Michael French	164,098	3.9

2002 Texas General Land Commissioner General Election
Party	Candidate	Votes	%
Republican	Jerry Patterson	2,331,700	53.2
Democratic	David Bernsen	1,819,365	41.5
Libertarian	Barbara Hernandez	180,870	4.1
Green	Michael McInerney	54,130	1.2

2002 Texas General Land Commissioner Republican Primary Election
Party	Candidate	Votes	%
Republican	Jerry Patterson	328,523	56.5
Republican	Kenn George	252,802	43.5

1998 Texas General Land Commissioner Republican Primary Election
Party	Candidate	Votes	%
Republican	David Dewhurst	265,363	51.2
Republican	Jerry Patterson	216,250	41.7
Republican	Don Loucks	36,706	7

1994 Texas State Senate District 11 General Election
Party	Candidate	Votes	%
Republican	Jerry Patterson (Incumbent)	73,959	55.61
Democratic	Mike Martin	59,047	44.39

1992 Texas State Senate District 11 General Election
Party	Candidate	Votes	%
Republican	Jerry Patterson	98,671	49.21
Democratic	Chet Brooks (Incumbent)	92,702	46.24
Libertarian	Marshall Anderson	9,121	4.55

1984 Texas U.S. Congressional District 25 General Election
Party	Candidate	Votes	%
Democratic	Mike Andrews (Incumbent)	113,946	64
Republican	Jerry Patterson	63,974	36

== See also ==
Party political offices
Preceded by David Dewhurst	Republican nominee for Land Commissioner of Texas; 2002, 2006, 2010	Succeeded by George P. Bush
Texas Senate
Preceded by Chet Brooks	Texas State Senator from District 11 (Pasadena)^{(1)} 1993–1999	Succeeded by Mike Jackson
Political offices
Preceded by David Dewhurst	Commissioner of the Texas General Land Office; 2003–2015	Succeeded by George P. Bush
Notes and references
1. For the 73rd Legislature, Patterson's home city was Houston.
