= Kate Rogers (historian) =

American non-profit executive

Kate Rogers is an American nonprofit executive who has worked in marketing, communications, public education, fundraising, and historic preservation.

Rogers served as executive director and later president and CEO of the Alamo Trust from 2021 to 2025, where she led much of the organization's work on a major redevelopment of the Alamo. Rogers left the Alamo Trust in October 2025 following a dispute with Texas officials over her academic writings and the interpretation of the Alamo's history. She subsequently filed a federal lawsuit alleging retaliation and violation of her First Amendment rights.

Rogers was named chief development officer of the Tobin Center for the Performing Arts in August 2026.

== Education ==
Rogers earned a Bachelor of Science degree in advertising and public relations, graduating magna cum laude, from Texas Christian University. She later received a Master of Public Affairs from the LBJ School of Public Affairs at the University of Texas at Austin.

She earned a Doctor of Education degree in global education from the University of Southern California. Her doctoral dissertation, completed in 2023, was titled The Role of U.S. Historic Sites and Museums in Supporting Social Studies Instruction in K-12 Classrooms. The research examined historic sites including Mount Vernon, Monticello, Gettysburg and the National World War II Museum in New Orleans. Rogers later said that the dissertation was not specifically about the Alamo, although she discussed her position as executive director of the Alamo Trust and the political environment surrounding the site.

== Early career ==
Rogers worked in marketing and communications at H-E-B almost 20 years. After leaving H-E-B, she became vice president of community outreach and engagement at the Charles Butt Foundation. She was the founding president of the Holdsworth Center, a leadership institute for public school professionals in Austin.

Rogers' career shifted increasingly to nonprofit leadership, fundraising and public education, a particular focus of hers. She also served on the boards of the Alamo Colleges Foundation and Early Matters San Antonio. She was named the 2022 Woman of the Year by the San Antonio Business Journal and was included on a list of the top 100 Texans to watch.

== Alamo Trust ==
In early 2021, Kate Rogers joined the Alamo Trust as executive officer. The Alamo Trust is the nonprofit responsible for daily operations at the Alamo and for implementing the restoration and expansion project, the Alamo Plan. The project involves the Texas General Land Office, the city of San Antonio, and other public and private partners.

In 2025 the project was estimated to be $500 million. Rogers was promoted to president and CEO less than two months before her October 2025 departure.

Rogers oversaw the Trust's role in implementing the Alamo Plan, including fundraising, staffing, preservation, exhibitions, and development of the planned visitor center and museum.

According to the San Antonio Report Rogers said she had been recruited by a search firm and recommended by local figures. At the time, the organization was seeking a leader who understood both San Antonio's political environment and the broader political landscape in Texas.

The redevelopment of the site was designed with eight galleries, including the lobby, arranged chronologically. The planned interpretation would cover Indigenous occupation of the region, the mission period, Mexican rule, the events leading to the Texas Revolution, the Battle of the Alamo, and the site's later history and influence on popular culture. The battle gallery was intended to be the largest and most dramatic section of the museum. By October 2025 when Rogers had departed, much of the physical exhibit design had been established and artifacts had been selected, while the wording of the interpretive panels remained under development.

One component of the redevelopment plan, the Ralston Family Collections Center, opened in March 2023. It was the first new building associated with the plan. The Texas Cavaliers Education Center opened in May 2026. Another component, the Alamo Visitor Center and Museum, the centerpiece of the site’s redevelopment plan, is scheduled to open in 2028.

She recruited key staff members and oversaw the acquisition of the Donald and Louise Yena Collection. She also introduced several new interpretive exhibits, such as the 18 Pounder Losoya House, the Palisade and Mission Gate, and a new Sacristy Exhibit inside the Alamo Church.

Rogers also led a statewide fundraising campaign that raised nearly $90 million in private funding.

In an interview Rogers said the museum's interpretive process involved consultation with historians, community members, and other stakeholders. She said the interpretive script had gone through two drafts when she departed.

=== Controversy over the Alamo's historical interpretation ===
The redevelopment involved competing views about how the Alamo's history should be presented. Rogers was hired in part because of her perceived ability to navigate the difference between visions. She has described her role in the redevelopment as an effort to bridge competing perspectives among state and local officials, historians, and community members.

Republican state leaders Texas Lieutenant Governor Dan Patrick and Texas Land Commissioner Dawn Buckingham wanted the focus to be on the 13-day siege and the legendary 1836 Battle of the Alamo. Local leaders from Bexar County and the City of San Antonio favored a broader interpretation that included the Indigenous people of the area and the role slavery played in the Texas Revolution. Rogers maintained that the museum's purpose was to place the Battle of the Alamo within the broader history of the site.

The dispute crystalized in disagreements over the draft interpretive text. Buckingham criticized aspects of the draft, including what she viewed as insufficient emphasis on freedom, patriotism and liberty, while excessively emphasizing slavery. Patrick wrote a letter to the trust’s board, demanding that the overriding emphasis be on the battle.

On October 13, 2025 the dispute intensified when posts on the Alamo’s social media sites recognized Indigenous Peoples' Day. The posts declared the redevelopment was recognizing Indigenous Peoples' and noted that the future Alamo Visitor Center and Museum would feature an Indigenous Peoples gallery. The Alamo Trust's communications director, Jonathan Huhn, was fired over the post. and later script writer Steve Harrigan was also fired. Buckingham criticized the post, saying "woke has no place at the Alamo."

Rogers' 2023 doctoral dissertation later became another issue in October. In it she discussed the political environment surrounding the Alamo and described what she characterized as a conservative agenda. She also stated that she did not believe politicians should determine what professional educators teach in classrooms.

Patrick characterized passages in her dissertation as "troubling writings" that were incompatible with the way he believed the history of the Alamo should be presented. He posted an excerpt of Rogers' dissertation on social media, in which Rogers described the competing politics among political leaders.

Rogers maintained that the dissertation was academic work written as a private citizen and that her research was concerned with historic sites and K-12 social studies education rather than specifically with the Alamo.

=== Resignation from the Alamo Trust ===
On October 22, 2025, Patrick called Rogers regarding her dissertation and subsequently demanded her resignation. Rogers resigned as president and CEO of the Alamo Trust the next day. The organization appointed former Texas Secretary of State Esperanza "Hope" Andrade as her successor October 24.

Three board members of the Remember the Alamo Foundation resigned in protest of Rogers' ouster. The foundation raises funds to support the Alamo Trust's comprehensive Alamo Plan.

Rep. Trey Martinez Fischer, D-San Antonio, said "the Alamo Plan was on time and on budget, all with Dr. Rogers at the helm" shortly after her departure.

Resigning board member Phillip P. Bakke described Rogers as an "extraordinary" leader. In a statement to the San Antonio Express-News he characterized the circumstances surrounding her departure as a "personal vendetta by one state official", which Bakke said had "metastasized into an outrageous campaign to disqualify her on the flimsiest of grounds".

Rogers said her resignation resulted from the political dispute over her writings and the interpretation of the Alamo. State and Alamo Trust officials disputed that characterization, saying she chose to resign.

Rogers' proposed separation agreement included approximately $800,000 in severance. Defendants said in court filings that she negotiated her severance in bad faith. The Alamo Trust subsequently revoked the proposed severance agreement. This became one of the issues in Rogers' later lawsuit.

== First Amendment lawsuit ==
In November 2025, Rogers filed a federal lawsuit against Patrick, Buckingham, the Alamo Trust and other defendants. She alleged that state officials and trust leaders retaliated against her because of opinions she expressed in her dissertation and violated her First Amendment rights. She sought damages and reinstatement as CEO.

Rogers argued that Patrick and Buckingham exercised substantial influence over the Alamo Trust and used that influence to force her from her position. The defendants denied the allegations, characterized the lawsuit as a publicity stunt and argued that Rogers' claims were barred by immunity. They also argued that Rogers had acted in bad faith during severance negotiations and had violated proposed non-disparagement restrictions.

=== 2026 court ruling ===
On August 25, 2026, U.S. District Judge Xavier Rodriguez rejected most of the defendants' motions to dismiss and ruled that most of Rogers' claims could proceed. The ruling did not determine the ultimate merits of the case. Instead it determined that Rogers had alleged legally sufficient claims to continue the litigation.

Rodriguez found that Rogers had plausibly alleged that she wrote her dissertation as a citizen protected by the First Amendment and that Patrick and Buckingham exercised significant influence over the Alamo Trust. The judge also ruled that the two elected officials were not immune from Rogers' claims. Her claims for damages against Patrick could proceed, although Rodriguez ruled that Patrick could not be ordered to reinstate her because he did not have authority to appoint the trust's CEO.

The judge also allowed Rogers' claim that the defendants retaliated against her by revoking her severance offer to proceed. One claim against the affiliated foundation was dismissed because Rogers had not shown that the foundation played a role in her resignation.

Buckingham and Patrick are appealing the judge's decision. As of August 25, 2026 the litigation remains pending.

== Later career ==
Rogers still serves as one of nine advisers with Texas State Board of Education on its K-12 social studies curriculum review, according to a December 1, 2025 report. The review will shape what Texas students learn about Texas history.

In August 2026, Rogers became chief development officer of the Tobin Center for the Performing Arts in San Antonio. She had previously served on the center's board of directors. In announcing her appointment, Rogers said that her experience on the board had strengthened her understanding of the organization's mission and that she intended to develop philanthropic partnerships and expand access to the center's programs.
