= Dawn Buckingham =

American politician (born 1968)

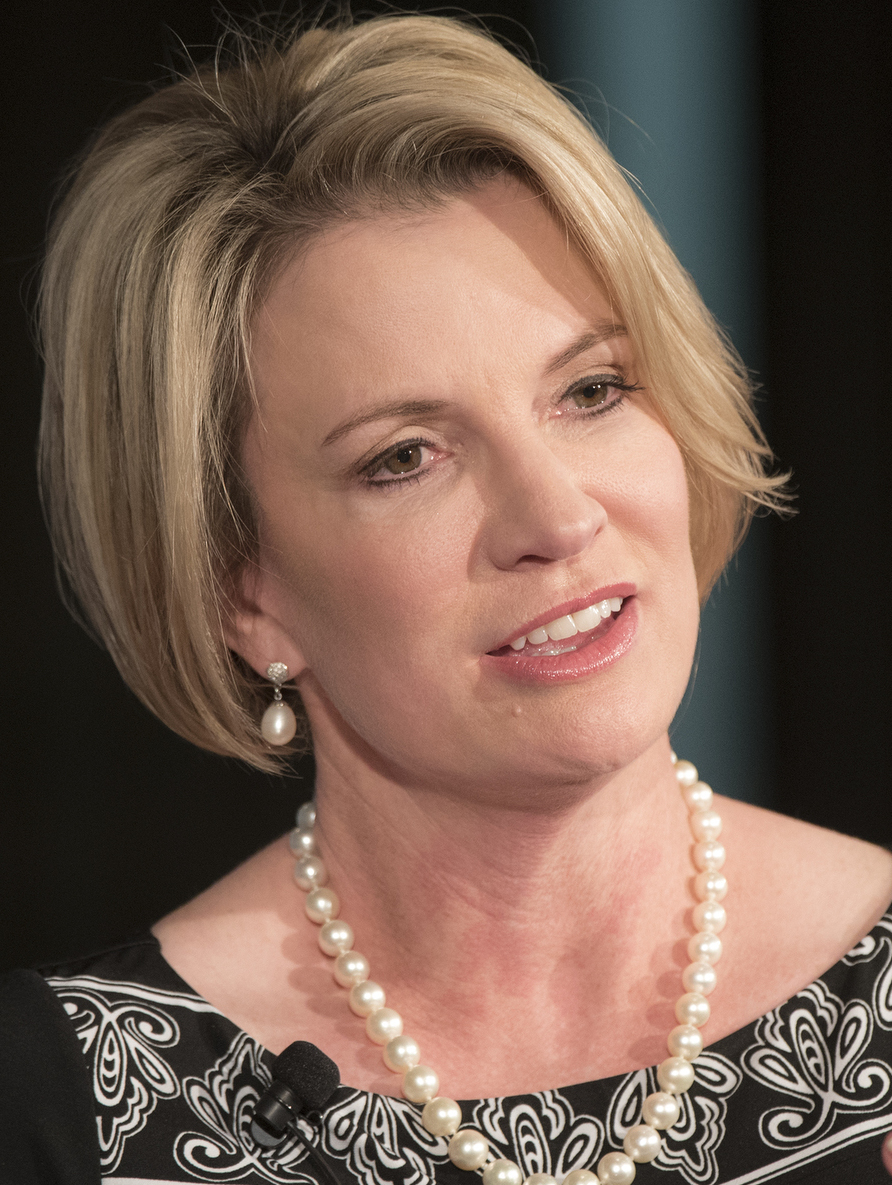
- Buckingham in 2017

29th Land Commissioner of Texas
- Incumbent
- Assumed office January 10, 2023
- Governor: Greg Abbott
- Preceded by: George P. Bush

Member of the Texas Senate from the 24th district
- In office January 10, 2017 – January 10, 2023
- Preceded by: Troy Fraser
- Succeeded by: Pete Flores

Personal details
- Born: February 21, 1968 (age 58)
- Party: Republican
- Spouse: Edward Buckingham
- Children: 2
- Education: University of Texas, Austin (BS); University of Texas, Galveston (MD)
- Website: Office website Campaign website

Dawn Buckingham (born February 21, 1968) is an American physician and politician who has served as Land Commissioner of Texas since 2023. She was elected in November 2022 and sworn in on January 10, 2023. A member of the Republican Party, she served as a state Senator from 2017 to 2023. She worked as a surgeon before being elected Land Commissioner. She is the first woman in Texas history to serve as Land Commissioner.

== Background ==
Buckingham is a seventh-generation Texan. Buckingham grew up in League City, Texas, before moving to Austin. She attended Westlake High School. She attended college at the University of Texas at Austin, and medical school at the University of Texas Medical Branch in Galveston, Texas.

Buckingham was a school board member of the Lake Travis Independent School District from 2014 to 2015. She was also an appointee to the Texas Sunset Advisory Commission and the vice chair of the Texas State Board for Educator Certification.

== Texas Senate ==
=== 2016 Texas Senate election ===
The district stretches from the Austin suburbs in Travis County, West to Texas Hill Country, and North to Abilene covering roughly 20,000 square miles of territory. Buckingham was one of six candidates in the Republican primary to replace retiring state senator Troy Fraser. Buckingham portrayed herself as a political outsider and was endorsed by former governor Rick Perry. In the March 1, 2016, primary she received 25% of the vote, with state representative Susan King of Abilene receiving 27% of the vote. Because neither candidate received a majority, they advanced to a runoff election in May. After a contentious campaign focusing on the records and geographic profiles of the two candidates, Buckingham won the runoff with over 60% of the vote.

In the November general election, Buckingham faced Democratic nominee Virginia "Jennie Lou" Leeder of Llano. Buckingham won with over 70% of the vote.

=== Tenure ===
Buckingham filed her first bill to subject faithless presidential electors to a civil penalty of $5,000 and to bar them from being electors in the future. The American Conservative Union has given her a 96% lifetime rating.

== Texas Land Commissioner ==
=== 2022 Texas Land Commissioner campaign ===
On June 6, 2021, Buckingham announced a run for Texas Land Commissioner in 2022. She became the Republican nominee after winning the May 24, 2022, runoff.

=== 2026 Texas Land Commissioner campaign ===
Buckingham won the primary unopposed on March 3, 2026. She lost to Democratic nominee Benjamin Flores in the general election.

=== Tenure ===
Buckingham assumed office on January 10, 2023.

On March 7, 2023, a guest lecture by Texas A&M professor Joy Alonzo at the University of Texas Medical Branch (UTMB) was allegedly critical of Texas Lieutenant Governor Dan Patrick's administration's response to the opioid crisis. Buckingham's daughter attended the lecture, and shortly afterwards, Buckingham called Patrick to relay Alonzo's comments. Buckingham's run for Land Commissioner had been endorsed by Patrick the previous year, and they had served six years together in the Texas Senate. Buckingham then also called Texas A&M's vice chancellor for governmental relations to relay the same information. Within a few hours of the lecture ending, UTMB emailed a notice of formal censure of Alonzo to all lecture attendees. A subsequent investigation and consideration of termination of Alonzo by Texas A&M was started. The investigation was ultimately closed two weeks later and found no evidence of wrongdoing.

Following the re-election of President Donald Trump in November 2024, Buckingham pledged to help his new administration with deportation of illegal immigrants by donating land owned by the State of Texas.

Buckingham was involved in the departure of Kate Rogers from her position leading the redevelopment of the Alamo in October 2025. The following month Rogers filed a federal lawsuit against Buckingham, Dan Patrick, and the Alamo Trust. She alleged that state officials and trust leaders retaliated against her because of opinions she expressed in her 2023 doctoral dissertation and violated her First Amendment rights. On August 25, 2026, U.S. District Judge Xavier Rodriguez rejected some of the defendants' motions to dismiss Rogers’ allegations and ruled that the rest of Rogers' claims could proceed, including her allegation that Buckingham had violated her First Amendment rights by pressing for her resignation from the trust.

== Personal life ==
Buckingham is married to Ed Buckingham; they are both practicing physicians, herself as an oculoplastic surgeon. Buckingham is a Christian. The Buckinghams have a son and a daughter. Their son, Dalton, played college baseball at Sewanee as an undergrad, then transferred to Texas State University as a graduate student to complete his baseball career and earn an M.B.A.

Party political offices
Preceded by George P. Bush	Republican nominee for Land Commissioner of Texas; 2022, 2026	Most recent
Political offices
Preceded by George P. Bush	Land Commissioner of Texas; 2023–present	Incumbent
