= George P. Bush =

American politician and attorney (born 1976)

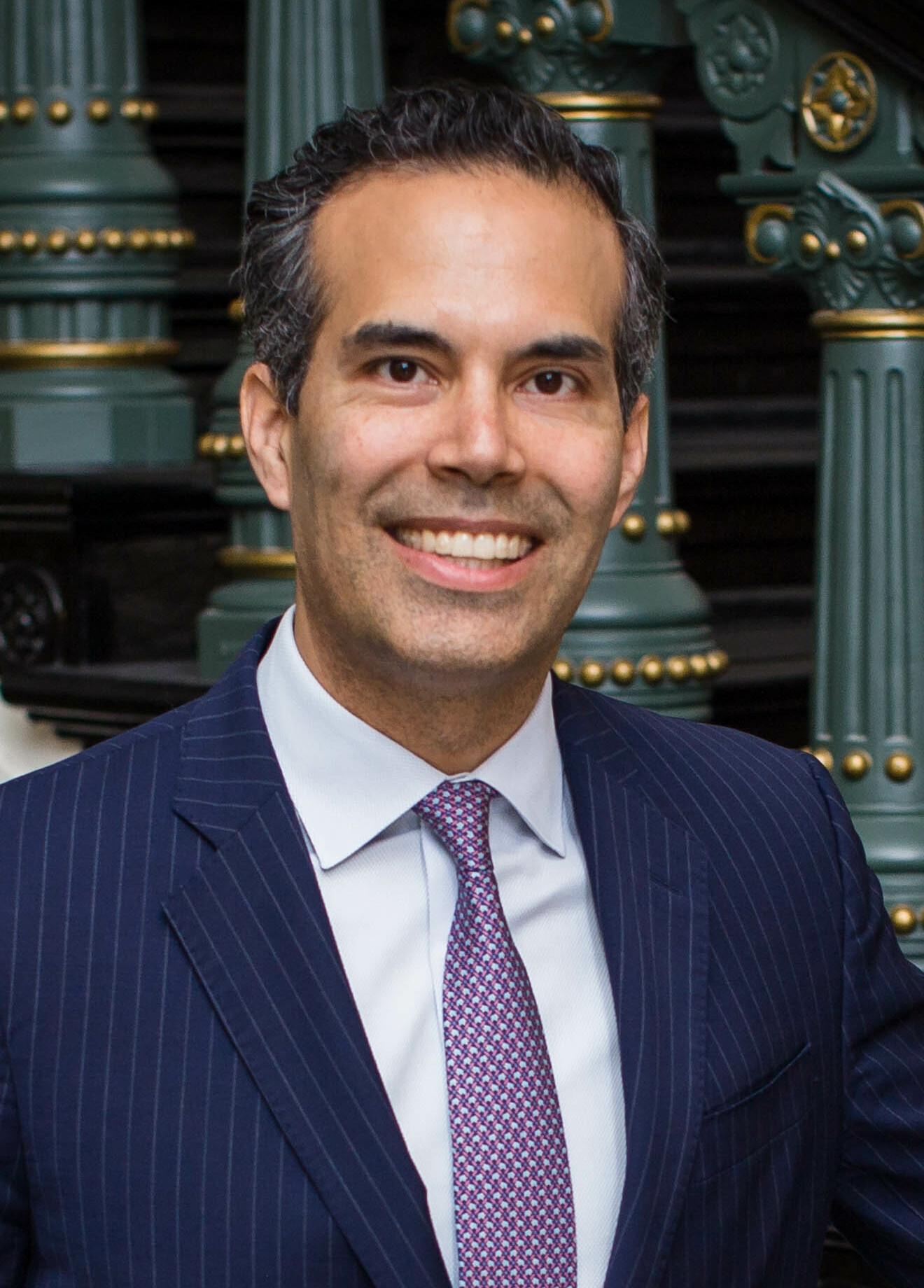
- Bush in 2019

28th Land Commissioner of Texas
- In office January 2, 2015 – January 10, 2023
- Governor: Rick Perry; Greg Abbott
- Preceded by: Jerry E. Patterson
- Succeeded by: Dawn Buckingham

Personal details
- Born: George Prescott Bush; April 24, 1976 (age 50) Houston, Texas, U.S.
- Party: Republican
- Spouse: Amanda Williams (m. 2004)
- Children: 2
- Parents: Jeb Bush (father); Columba Bush (mother)
- Relatives: Bush family
- Education: Rice University (BA); University of Texas at Austin (JD)

Military service
- Branch/service: United States Navy
- Years of service: 2007–2017
- Rank: Lieutenant
- Unit: United States Navy Reserve
- Battles/wars: War in Afghanistan
- Awards: Joint Service Commendation Medal

George Prescott Bush (born April 24, 1976) is an American politician and attorney who served as the commissioner of the Texas General Land Office from 2015 to 2023. A member of the Republican Party, Bush unsuccessfully campaigned for the party's nomination in the 2022 Texas Attorney General election.

A fourth-generation elected official of the Bush family, he is the eldest child of former governor of Florida Jeb Bush; nephew of the 43rd president, George W. Bush; grandson of the 41st president, George H. W. Bush; and great-grandson of former U.S. senator from Connecticut Prescott Bush.

== Early life and education ==
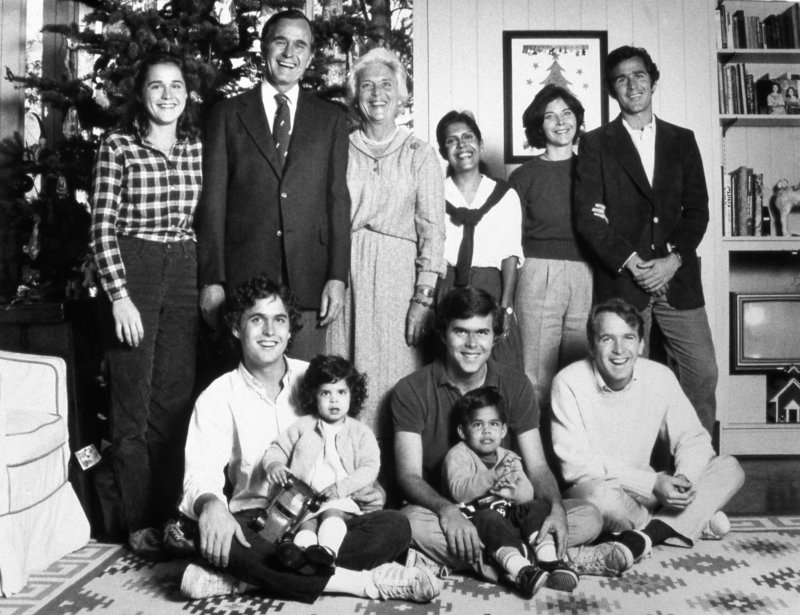
Bush with his father, Jeb, and the Bush family in December 1979

Bush was born in Houston, Texas, to Jeb and Columba Bush (née Garnica Gallo). Bush has two siblings: younger sister Noelle Lucila Bush and younger brother John Ellis Bush Jr. Bush attended Gulliver Preparatory School in the Miami area.

In December 1994, Bush was involved in an incident at his former girlfriend's home after attempting to break in and later driving his car through the front yard. His girlfriend's father declined to press charges. He graduated from Rice University with a Bachelor of Arts in history in 1998. He then attended the University of Texas School of Law from 2000 until 2003, graduating with a Juris Doctor degree.

== Career ==
=== Education ===
From August 1998 until June 1999, Bush taught social studies at a public high school in Homestead, Florida. Bush accepted an advisory board chair position for charter school organization Uplift Education when the group announced an expansion into Tarrant County, Texas, in 2011. Bush had left the board by 2014 to run for Texas Land Commissioner.

=== Legal ===
Bush clerked for U.S. District Judge for the Northern District of Texas Sidney A. Fitzwater from September 2003 until 2004. From 2004 to 2007 he practiced corporate and securities law with Akin, Gump, Strauss, Hauer & Feld LLP in Dallas. In 2005, Bush was selected as one of Texas Monthly's "Rising Stars" for his work with Akin Gump.

From 2007 to 2012, Bush was a partner at Pennybacker Capital, LLC, a real estate private equity firm in Austin, Texas. The firm was originally named N3 Capital and headquartered in Fort Worth. In 2012, he founded St. Augustine Partners, an energy and technology-focused investment firm in Fort Worth. After Bush's defeat in the March 2022 attorney general primary to Ken Paxton, he went to work for a Wisconsin-based law firm called Michael Best & Friedrich LLP, based out of Austin. In 2024 he was named the Managing Partner of the Austin office.

== Military service ==
Bush told Politico that attending the October 2006 launch of the USS George H.W. Bush inspired him to join the United States Navy. He also called the death of Pat Tillman, the National Football League player and Army Ranger who was killed by friendly fire in Afghanistan in 2004, "a wake-up call".

In March 2007, the United States Navy Reserve selected Bush for training as an intelligence officer through the direct commission officer program, a Navy initiative whereby applicants in specialized civilian fields forgo the typical prerequisites of a commission, such as the Naval Academy, NROTC or OCS, and—instead—attend the Direct Commissioned Officer Indoctrination Course (DCOIC), a three-week course on subjects such as naval history, customs and courtesies, followed by online classes. He was commissioned as a Navy Reserve Officer in May 2007. Bush served in Afghanistan for eight months from June 2010 to February 2011. During the deployment, he was given a different name for security purposes. Bush left the U.S. Navy Reserve in May 2017 as a lieutenant.

== Texas Land Commissioner ==
=== 2014 election ===
In September 2012, Bush announced his intention to run for office, saying that he was considering one of several state offices. Two months later he filed papers required to run for state office in Texas. The same month, his father, Jeb Bush, emailed donors requesting that they support him in his 2014 bid for Texas Land Commissioner.

In January 2013, Bush filed a campaign finance report stating he had received about $1.3 million in campaign contributions. In March 2013, Bush filed to run for Texas Land Commissioner. The main role of the Land Office is negotiating and enforcing leases for mineral rights on millions of acres of land owned by the State of Texas.

By June 2013, Bush had raised $3.3 million even though no Democratic candidate had emerged for land commissioner. On November 19, 2013, he officially filed the papers to run for Texas Land Commissioner.

In the 2014 Republican primary, outgoing Land Commissioner Jerry E. Patterson ran unsuccessfully for lieutenant governor while Bush defeated David Watts of Gilmer in Upshur County for the Republican nomination for land commissioner; Bush received 74 percent of the vote, totaling 937,987 votes to Watts' 27 percent with 346,949 votes.

In the November 4 general election, Bush faced Democrat John Cook, a former mayor of El Paso. Bush won 61 percent of the vote against token opposition, carrying "virtually every demographic" and riding a nationwide Republican wave in the midterms. He became the only Bush to win his first election.

=== 2018 election ===
As of January 2017, Bush had about $3.1 million in campaign cash for his re-election campaign. He won the March 6, 2018, Republican primary with nearly 58 percent of the vote, defeating three other candidates including Jerry E. Patterson, the previous land commissioner. In the general election, Bush received 53.68 percent of the vote to Democratic candidate Miguel Suazo's 43.19 percent and Libertarian Matt Pina's 3.1 percent.

=== Tenure ===
Bush assumed office on January 2, 2015.

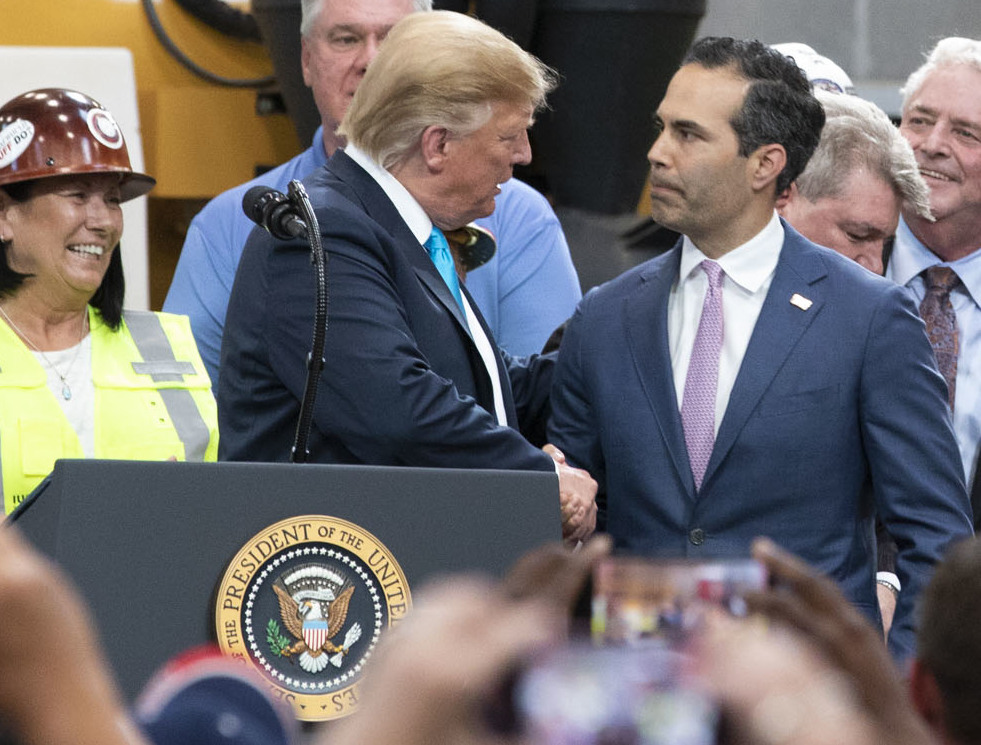
Bush welcomes President Donald Trump to an International Union of Operating Engineers training center in Crosby, Texas, on April 10, 2019

As state land commissioner, Bush oversaw the Texas General Land Office (GLO), which manages about 13 million acres of state land and is in charge of auctions for leases to extract oil and natural gas on those lands.

In 2015, the GLO under Bush took control of the Alamo, a historic site in San Antonio, ending the state's partnership with the Daughters of the Republic of Texas (DRT), which had managed the site for decades. In firing DRT as managers of the Alamo, Bush alleged that the group had violated its contract. Bush locked the DRT out of the Daughters of the Republic of Texas Library, and the GLO claimed ownership over the library's collections and artifacts. DRT sued, and the suit was settled in 2016, with Bush and the GLO relinquishing their claims and agreeing to pay the DRT $200,000 in legal fees. Bush oversaw a $450-million remodel of the Alamo and the plaza around it. In 2015, Bush spoke at a fundraising event for the Alamo Endowment, which took over management of the site in conjunction with the GLO. English singer Phil Collins donated various Alamo-related artifacts to the State of Texas, with the stipulation that the State of Texas build a facility to hold the artifacts within a seven-year period. The Texas state legislature made a one-time infusion of $25 million to Bush's GLO to redevelop the Alamo site, and the city of San Antonio agreed to provide $1 million for the redevelopment.

Bush dismissed some one hundred land commission employees hired under the preceding Commissioner Jerry E. Patterson. According to the San Antonio Express-News, Bush paid almost $1 million in taxpayer funds to encourage the dismissed personnel not to file suit against either him or the agency. He kept at least forty persons on the payroll for up to five months after terminating their employment; they agreed in writing not to sue.

In 2016, the office began a multi-year study on the flood effects of the Houston area and Texas coast.

In June 2020, amid reports that George W. Bush and Jeb Bush would not support Trump's re-election, George P. Bush announced his full support for Trump, saying "Trump is the only thing standing between America and socialism."

In 2021, Bush supported the ouster of Liz Cheney from her position as chair of the House Republican Conference in Congress.

In 2020 and 2021, Bush said he was considering running for Texas attorney general in 2022 against incumbent Ken Paxton, a Republican accused of scandal. On June 2, 2021, Bush officially announced his candidacy.

== 2022 Texas Attorney General election ==
In June 2021, Bush entered the race for Texas Attorney General with a campaign video that praised Donald Trump and did not mention his father, grandfather, or great-grandfather. Trump then endorsed Bush's opponent, Ken Paxton.

During the campaign, Bush criticized the ways in which Paxton sought to overturn the 2020 election results, but said he did not disagree with Paxton's "intent". His campaign talking points were "massive voter fraud", "critical race theory" in schools, finishing the "Trump wall", and district attorneys in big cities "who are not on the side of law enforcement." He also said he would "go after human traffickers and drug cartels".

Paxton defeated Bush with 68% of the vote to Bush's 32% in the primary election runoff. The Texas Tribune wrote that Bush's "defeat could mark the end of a four-generation political dynasty."

== Political activities ==
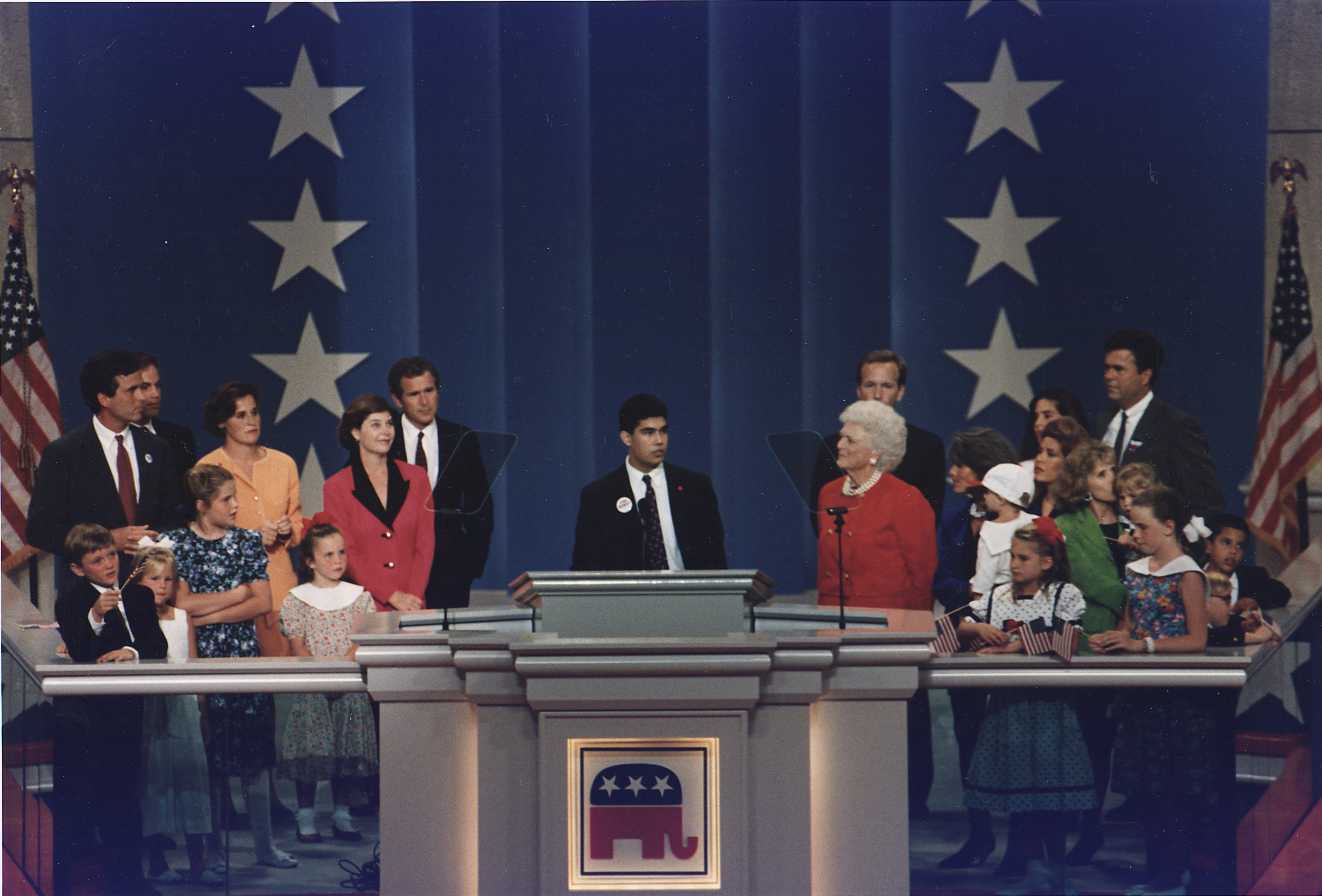
Bush speaking at the 1992 Republican National Convention

=== Campaign activities for his relatives and Donald Trump ===
At the age of 12, Bush spoke before the 1988 Republican National Convention, which nominated his grandfather. He also spoke at the 1992 convention on the occasion of his renomination. He campaigned for his uncle, George W. Bush, during his successful 2000 and 2004 presidential campaigns, often performing outreach to Latino voters. He worked on the 2000 presidential campaign from 1999 to 2000. Bush has called himself a "George W. Bush Republican" on immigration reform, and has expressed support for portions of the DREAM Act in the past.

When asked in 2003 about whether he planned to run for office himself, Bush replied that his grandmother, Barbara Bush, had advised that anyone thinking about entering politics should distinguish himself in some other field first: "Make a name for yourself, have a family, marry someone great, have some kids, buy a house, pay taxes, and do the things everyone also does instead of just running out and saying, 'Hey, I'm the nephew of or the son of or the grandson of...'"

His father campaigned in the 2016 Republican presidential race, but later dropped out. After his father's exit, Bush campaigned for Donald Trump while most of the remainder of the Bush family did not support him. By 2021, ABC News described Bush as an "avowed Trump backer" and Trump, who had shown animosity toward the Bush family in the past, favorably coined Bush as "My Bush."

=== Republican Party positions ===
As of 2012, he was the deputy finance chairman of the Republican Party of Texas.

=== Work on political action committees ===
Bush was the national co-chair of Maverick PAC, a national political action committee dedicated to engaging the next generation of Republican voters. Bush served as a member of several diplomacy missions, including one to Nicaragua for the second peaceful transfer of power in that country, and one to Brazil for the Pan American Games in 2007. He also joined two US Congressional delegations, one to Saudi Arabia during the Arab Spring of 2011 and one to Turkey in 2012 at the time of the civil war in neighboring Syria.

Bush is a co-founder and serves on the board of directors of Hispanic Republicans of Texas, a political action committee whose goal is to elect Republican political candidates to office in the state.

== Political positions ==
In August 2004, during a trip to Mexico sponsored by the group Republicans Abroad, he called Venezuelan President Hugo Chávez a dictator and criticized the U.S. Border Patrol's use of guns which fire plastic pellets packed with chili powder. Bush was quoted as telling Mexican media, "If there has been American approval for this policy, that is reprehensible. It's kind of barbarous." He attributed the gun usage to "some local INS guy who's trying to be tough, act macho", although it is an agency policy.

In 2009, Bush criticized Florida Governor Charlie Crist for accepting money from the 2009 stimulus package, calling for a return to fiscal conservatism. In January 2010, he endorsed Marco Rubio, Crist's opponent for the United States Senate.

Bush said that climate change is a serious threat to Texas but he does not accept the scientific consensus which attributes climate change to human activity.

In February 2021, Texas experienced a humanitarian crisis after widespread power outages were caused by the infrastructure not being weatherized. Although 90 percent of the power plants that failed were fueled by fossil and nuclear fuels, Bush attacked wind and solar energy: "If the last few days have proven anything, it's that we need oil & gas. Relying solely on renewable energy would be catastrophic."

== Personal life ==
Bush was featured in People's 100 most eligible bachelors in 2000.

Bush married law school classmate Amanda L. Williams on August 7, 2004, in Kennebunkport, Maine, at St. Ann's by-the-Sea Episcopal Church. Williams is a media law attorney at the firm Jackson Walker LLP in Fort Worth, Texas. The couple has two sons.

== Awards and honors ==
In 2016, the League of United Latin American Citizens Council No. 12 in Laredo gave Bush and Mexican official José Antonio Meade Kuribreña the titles of Señor Internacional, an honor given to distinguished figures in the border region.

== Electoral history ==
Texas Attorney General Republican primary runoff election, 2022
Party	Candidate	Votes	%
Republican	Ken Paxton	633,223	67.96
Republican	George P. Bush	298,577	32.04

Texas Attorney General Republican Primary Election, 2022
Party	Candidate	Votes	%
Republican	Ken Paxton	820,602	42.71
Republican	George P. Bush	437,784	22.78
Republican	Eva Guzman	336,814	17.53
Republican	Louie Gohmert	326,186	16.98

Texas Land Commissioner Election, 2018
Party	Candidate	Votes	%
Republican	George P. Bush	4,414,779	53.7
Democratic	Miguel Suazo	3,542,587	43.1
Libertarian	Matt Piña	257,532	3.1

2018 Texas General Land Commissioner Republican Primary Election
Party	Candidate	Votes	%
Republican	George P. Bush (Incumbent)	859,209	58.2
Republican	Jerry E. Patterson	438,346	29.7
Republican	Davey Edwards	101,074	6.8
Republican	Rick Range	77,936	5.3

Texas Land Commissioner Republican Primary Election, 2014
Party	Candidate	Votes	%
Republican	George P. Bush	937,987	73.00
Republican	David Watts	346,949	27.00

Texas Land Commissioner Election, 2014
Party	Candidate	Votes	%
Republican	George P. Bush	2,827,584	60.68
Democratic	John Cook	1,645,828	35.32
Libertarian	Justin Knight	126,422	2.71
Green	Valerie Alessi	60,116	1.29

Party political offices
Preceded by Jerry E. Patterson	Republican nominee for Land Commissioner of Texas; 2014, 2018	Succeeded by Dawn Buckingham
Political offices
Preceded by Jerry E. Patterson	Land Commissioner of Texas; 2015–2023	Succeeded by Dawn Buckingham
