= Texas Alliance for Life =

Anti-abortion organization

The Texas Alliance for Life is an anti-abortion lobbying organization in the State of Texas. The group opposes "the advocacy and practice of abortion (except to preserve the mother's life)." The group also opposes euthanasia and "all forms of assisted suicide." It is based in Austin, Texas.

== Leadership and political activities ==
Joe Pojman is the founder and executive director of Texas Alliance for Life. He is a registered lobbyist in Texas, and in 2013 said that he had "been lobbying the Capitol for 26 years."

Texas Alliance for Life helped draft a strict state anti-abortion law (House Bill 2 of 2013) that imposed targeted regulation of abortion providers, leading to the closure more than two dozen clinics across Texas. The legislation was struck down as unconstitutional by the U.S. Supreme Court in Whole Woman's Health v. Hellerstedt in 2016. After the ruling, the Texas Alliance for Life shifted its focus to pushing for "increasing funding to the state's Alternatives to Abortion program."

The group has pushed for the defunding of Planned Parenthood. In the 2012 session, Pojman said the group's top priority was to "'continue to defund Planned Parenthood' by banning health providers affiliated with abortion providers from participating in the state's Medicaid program." In 2015, Pojman celebrated the Texas Legislature's passage of legislation laws that the group had pushed for to expel Planned Parenthood from a joint state-federal cancer screening program "and cut off the last bit of taxpayer money the organization received." Planned Parenthood clinics that had previous received cancer screening funds under the program were already barred from performing abortions."

Pojman supported Texas's highly controversial proposed "fetal remains" regulation, which sought to compel the "cremation or interment of aborted or miscarried fetuses."

The group has often clashed with another Texas anti-abortion group, the Texas Right to Life PAC. The Dallas News reported: "The policy differences the groups deem insurmountable would probably be imperceptible to most people. A bill by Texas Alliance for Life is more likely to include exceptions in extreme circumstances, whereas those supported by Texas Right to Life are usually more uncompromising." For example, Texas Alliance for Life has sponsored legislation to restrict or ban abortion with "exceptions for rape, incest or fetal anomalies" while Texas Right to Life PAC "opposes abortion in all circumstances." Texas Alliance for Life PAC "has primarily allied itself with establishment incumbents, some in key leadership positions" while the more hardline Texas Right to Life PAC "has thrown its weight behind ultra-conservative newcomers."

== Brain death controversy ==
Pojman argued for continuation of artificial life support for the body of Marlise Munoz. She was 14 weeks pregnant when her husband found her unconscious in November, possibly from a blood clot. Munoz subsequently died from brain death. Prior to her death, Munoz had indicated that she would not like to be kept artificially alive if brain dead. The fetus had suffered from oxygen deprivation and was suspected to be non-viable; the fetus's lower extremities were deformed to the extent that the gender couldn't be determined, had fluid building up inside the skull (hydrocephalus); and possibly had a heart problem. An attorney who had helped rewrite the Texas state law being used to keep her body on life support at John Peter Smith Hospital said that there was a problem with the application of the law to a patient that was no longer alive. Her husband Eric, with the support of her family, successfully sued the hospital for withdrawing treatment.

Numerous states have adopted laws restricting the ability of doctors to end artificial life support for terminally ill pregnant patients with 12 of those states (including Texas) with the most restrictive such laws, which automatically invalidate a woman’s advance directive if she is pregnant stating that, regardless of the progression of the pregnancy, a woman must remain on life sustaining treatment until she gives birth with no exception for patients who will be in prolonged severe pain or who will be physically harmed by continuing life sustaining treatment. Pojman, who was also involved in the drafting of the law, said the hospital is correctly abiding by the law's goal of protecting the rights of an unborn child.
