= Benjamin Flores (politician) =

American politician (born 1968)

Land Commissioner-elect of Texas
- Assuming office January 19, 2027
- Governor: Gina Hinojosa (elect)
- Succeeding: Dawn Buckingham

Personal details
- Born: Mexico
- Party: Democratic
- Spouse: An Huynh
- Children: 1
- Education: National Autonomous University of Mexico (attended)
- Website: Campaign website

Benjamin Flores is a Mexican-born American politician and pig farmer who is the land commissioner-elect of Texas. A member of the Democratic Party, he defeated incumbent Republican Dawn Buckingham in the 2026 election. Flores previously served as a member on the city council of Bay City.

== Background ==
Flores was born in Mexico. He studied geography at the National Autonomous University of Mexico's School of Philosophy and Letters in Mexico City but left his studies to come to the U.S. in 1996. He settled in San Diego and began working in cybersecurity, then moved to the Bay Area before moving to Texas.

Flores worked as a cybersecurity consultant for Travis County in Austin until he and his wife purchased a 10-acre property on the outskirts of Bay City in 2022 to raise Meishan pigs on. Soon after the purchase, the couple realized the property was located within the city's municipal boundaries and that Bay City had banned pig farming within its limits. After unsuccessfully arguing for an exemption, Flores ran for and won a seat on the city council in May 2023. The farm sparked a dispute and civil lawsuit from surrounding neighbors who argued it did not qualify for Texas' right-to-farm law; the civil lawsuit remained ongoing as of July 2025.

== Texas Land Commissioner ==
=== 2026 Texas Land Commissioner campaign ===
Flores announced his campaign for governor of Texas in July 2025, but ultimately switched to running for Land Commissioner of Texas and endorsed state representative Gina Hinojosa in October 2025. In the Democratic primary election, Flores defeated union leader Jose Loya with 55.6% of the vote. On June 12, 2026, Flores announced that he had been diagnosed with leukemia. While he stated the diagnosis would keep him off the campaign trail as he sought treatment at the MD Anderson Cancer Center, he affirmed that he would stay in the race. Two weeks later, the campaign announced that Flores was in remission.

During the campaign, Flores warned about the impact of climate change on Texas' coastline and opposed school vouchers. He also criticized incumbent Republican Dawn Buckingham for using the office's resources to support immigration enforcement. In the general election on November 3, 2026, Flores defeated Buckingham.

== Personal life ==
Flores is married to his wife, An Huynh, who previously worked as a project manager and grew up in Da Lat, Vietnam. The couple have a daughter. In June 2026, Flores announced he had been diagnosed with leukemia and that he was in remission. He received a stem-cell transplant in September 2026.
